= 1998–99 FC Schalke 04 season =

FC Schalke 04
1998–99 season
- Head coach: Huub Stevens
- Stadium: Parkstadion
- Bundesliga: 10th
- UEFA Cup: First Round
- Top goalscorer: League: Youri Mulder (6); Martin Max (6); All: Youri Mulder (6); Martin Max (6)
- Average home league attendance: 43,555

The 1998–99 season was the 95th season in the history of FC Schalke 04 and the club's eighth consecutive season in the top flight of German football.

== Competitions ==
=== Overall record ===
Competition	First match	Last match	Starting round	Final position	Record							
Competition	First match	Last match	Starting round	Final position	Pld	W	D	L	GF	GA	GD	Win %
Bundesliga	15 August 1998	29 May 1999	Matchday 1	10th	34	10	11	13	41	54	−13	29.41
UEFA Cup	15 September 1998	29 September 1998	First round	First Round	2	1	0	1	1	1	+0	50.00
Total					36	11	11	14	42	55	−13	30.56

Source: Competitions

=== Bundesliga ===
==== League table ====
Pos	Team	Pld	W	D	L	GF	GA	GD	Pts	Qualification or relegation
8	MSV Duisburg	34	13	10	11	48	45	+3	49	Qualification to Intertoto Cup second round
9	1860 Munich	34	11	8	15	49	56	−7	41	
10	Schalke 04	34	10	11	13	41	54	−13	41	
11	VfB Stuttgart	34	9	12	13	41	48	−7	39	
12	SC Freiburg	34	10	9	15	36	44	−8	39	

Source: www.dfb.de
Rules for classification: 1) points; 2) goal difference; 3) number of goals scored.

==== Matches ====
15 August 1998 1	Borussia Mönchengladbach	3–0	Schalke 04	Mönchengladbach
15:30 CEST (UTC+2)	Toni Polster 2'; Jörgen Pettersson 10'; Matthias Hagner 80'			Stadium: Bökelbergstadion; Attendance: 34,500; Referee: Markus Merk

22 August 1998 2	Schalke 04	1–0	VfB Stuttgart	Gelsenkirchen
15:30 CEST (UTC+2)	Martin Max 55'			Stadium: Parkstadion; Attendance: 48,248; Referee: Alfons Berg

9 September 1998 3	Hertha BSC	2–0	Schalke 04	Berlin
20:00 CEST (UTC+2)	Kjetil Rekdal (P) 65'; René Tretschok 75'			Stadium: Olympiastadion; Attendance: 47,887; Referee: Franz-Xaver Wack

12 September 1998 4	Schalke 04	2–2	1. FC Nürnberg	Gelsenkirchen
15:30 CEST (UTC+2)	René Eijkelkamp 30'; Martin Max (P) 43'		Saša Ćirić 52'; Markus Kurth 69'	Stadium: Parkstadion; Attendance: 48,900; Referee: Torsten Koop

19 September 1998 5	VfL Bochum	1–2	Schalke 04	Bochum
15:30 CEST (UTC+2)	Torsten Kracht 47'		René Eijkelkamp 52'; René Eijkelkamp 71'	Stadium: Ruhrstadion; Attendance: 29,253; Referee: Hermann Albrecht

26 September 1998 6	Schalke 04	0–1	Bayer 04 Leverkusen	Gelsenkirchen
15:30 CEST (UTC+2)			Ulf Kirsten 52'	Stadium: Parkstadion; Attendance: 40,823; Referee: Herbert Fandel

2 October 1998 7	VfL Wolfsburg	0–0	Schalke 04	Wolfsburg
20:00 CEST (UTC+2)				Stadium: VfL-Stadion am Elsterweg; Attendance: 15,638; Referee: Wolfgang Stark

17 October 1998 8	Schalke 04	1–3	FC Bayern Munich	Gelsenkirchen
15:30 CEST (UTC+2)	René Eijkelkamp 20'		Yves Eigenrauch (OG) 3'; Mario Basler 15'; Carsten Jancker 64'	Stadium: Parkstadion; Attendance: 62,109; Referee: Hartmut Strampe

24 October 1998 9	FC Hansa Rostock	2–2	Schalke 04	Rostock
15:30 CEST (UTC+2)	Igor Pamić 64'; Jens Dowe 66'		Martin Max 81'; Sascha Wolf 85'	Stadium: Ostseestadion; Attendance: 16,000; Referee: Uwe Kemmeling

3 November 1998 10	Schalke 04	1–1	SC Freiburg	Gelsenkirchen
20:00 CEST (UTC+2)	Jiří Němec 24'	31,450	Steffen Korell 71'	Stadium: Parkstadion; Attendance: 31,450; Referee: Lutz Wagner

7 November 1998 11	Hamburger SV	2–2	Schalke 04	Hamburg
15:30 CEST (UTC+2)	Bernd Hollerbach 39'; Tony Yeboah 67'		Youri Mulder 77'; Martin Max 81'	Stadium: Volksparkstadion; Attendance: 28,173; Referee: Torsten Koop

14 November 1998 12	Borussia Dortmund	3–0	Schalke 04	Dortmund
20:00 CEST (UTC+2)	Alfred Nijhuis 15'; Thomas Häßler (P) 45'; Andreas Möller 83'			Stadium: Westfalenstadion; Attendance: 30,300; Referee: Markus Merk

20 November 1998 13	Schalke 04	2–0	MSV Duisburg	Gelsenkirchen
15:30 CET (UTC+1)	René Eijkelkamp 37'; Michaël Goossens 59'			Stadium: Parkstadion; Attendance: 68,600; Referee: Bernd Heynemann

24 November 1998 14	Schalke 04	1–2	SV Werder Bremen	Gelsenkirchen
20:00 CET (UTC+1)	Nico Van Kerckhoven 87'		Jens Todt 55'; Andi Herzog 59'	Stadium: Parkstadion; Attendance: 31,043; Referee: Winfried Buchhart

29 November 1998 15	1. FC Kaiserslautern	4–1	Schalke 04	Kaiserslautern
18:00 CET (UTC+1)	Marian Hristov 9'; Uwe Rösler 67'; János Hrutka 71'; Olaf Marschall (P) 74'		Martin Max 34'	Stadium: Fritz-Walter Stadion; Attendance: 41,500; Referee: Bernhard Zerr

5 December 1998 16	Eintracht Frankfurt	1–2	Schalke 04	Frankfurt am Main
15:30 CET (UTC+1)	Jan Åge Fjørtoft 80'		Marco van Hoogdalem 21'; Sven Kmetsch 38'	Stadium: Waldstadion; Attendance: 33,000; Referee: Georg Dardenne

12 December 1998 17	Schalke 04	2–2	TSV 1860 Munich	Gelsenkirchen
15:30 CET (UTC+1)	Sven Kmetsch 74'; Marco Kurz (OG) 90'		Markus Schroth 45'; Harald Cerny 49'	Stadium: Parkstadion; Attendance: 36,185; Referee: Edgar Steinborn

19 December 1998 18	Schalke 04	1–0	Borussia Mönchengladbach	Gelsenkirchen
15:30 CET (UTC+1)	Marc Wilmots 77'			Stadium: Parkstadion; Attendance: 41,800; Referee: Jürgen Aust

20 February 1999 19	VfB Stuttgart	2–1	Schalke 04	Stuttgart
15:30 CET (UTC+1)	Kristijan Đorđević 46'; Saša Marković 81'		Youri Mulder 47'	Stadium: Gottlieb-Daimler-Stadion; Attendance: 26,500; Referee: Herbert Fandel

28 February 1999 20	Schalke 04	0–0	Hertha BSC	Gelsenkirchen
18:00 CET (UTC+1)				Stadium: Parkstadion; Attendance: 41,100; Referee: Franz-Xaver Wack

5 March 1999 21	1. FC Nürnberg	3–0	Schalke 04	Nuremberg
20:00 CET (UTC+1)	Pavel Kuka 36'; Saša Ćirić 45'; Pavel Kuka 60'			Stadium: Frankenstadion; Attendance: 40,100; Referee: Uwe Kemmeling

13 March 1999 22	Schalke 04	2–2	VfL Bochum	Gelsenkirchen
15:30 CET (UTC+1)	Youri Mulder (P) 19'; Mike Büskens 28'		Thomas Reis (P) 20'; Yıldıray Baştürk 24'	Stadium: Parkstadion; Attendance: 47,700; Referee: Lutz Michael Fröhlich

19 March 1999 23	Bayer 04 Leverkusen	1–1	Schalke 04	Leverkusen
20:00 CET (UTC+1)	Stefan Beinlich 36'		Youri Mulder 56'	Stadium: BayArena; Attendance: 22,500; Referee: Lutz Wagner

3 April 1999 24	Schalke 04	2–0	VfL Wolfsburg	Gelsenkirchen
15:30 CET (UTC+1)	Mike Büskens 60'; Johan de Kock 83'			Stadium: Parkstadion; Attendance: 43,700; Referee: Helmut Fleischer

10 April 1999 25	FC Bayern Munich	1–1	Schalke 04	Munich
15:30 CET (UTC+1)	Alexander Zickler 49'		Oliver Held 62'	Stadium: Olympiastadion; Attendance: 63,000; Referee: Alfons Berg

13 April 1998 26	Schalke 04	1–0	FC Hansa Rostock	Gelsenkirchen
20:00 CET (UTC+1)	Sascha Wolf 76'			Stadium: Parkstadion; Attendance: 33,160; Referee: Hermann Albrecht

17 April 1998 27	SC Freiburg	0–2	Schalke 04	Freiburg im Breisgau
15:30 CET (UTC+1)			Ünal Alpuğan 70'; Sascha Wolf 85'	Stadium: Dreisamstadion; Attendance: 22,500; Referee: Hartmut Strampe

24 April 1999 28	Schalke 04	1–4	Hamburger SV	Gelsenkirchen
15:30 CEST (UTC+2)	Olaf Thon 6'		Andrej Panadić 22'; Martin Groth 36'; Hans-Jörg Butt (P) 61'; Tony Yeboah 72'	Stadium: Parkstadion; Attendance: 49,800; Referee: Wolfgang Stark

5 May 1999 29	Schalke 04	1–1	Borussia Dortmund	Gelsenkirchen
20:00 CEST (UTC+2)	Youri Mulder 32'		Alfred Nijhuis 3'	Stadium: Parkstadion; Attendance: 32,495; Referee: Lutz Michael Fröhlich

8 May 1999 30	MSV Duisburg	1–2	Schalke 04	Duisburg
20:00 CEST (UTC+2)	Tomasz Hajto 37'		Andreas Müller 47'; Youri Mulder 82'	Stadium: Werdaustadion; Attendance: 61,700; Referee: Franz-Xaver Wack

11 May 1999 31	SV Werder Bremen	1–0	Schalke 04	Bremen
15:30 CEST (UTC+2)	Christoph Dabrowski 54'			Stadium: Weserstadion; Attendance: 23,035; Referee: Hermann Albrecht

16 May 1999 32	Schalke 04	0–2	1. FC Kaiserslautern	Gelsenkirchen
18:00 CEST (UTC+2)			Michael Schjønberg (P) 73'; Jürgen Rische 89'	Stadium: Parkstadion; Attendance: 41,119; Referee: Georg Dardenne

22 May 1999 33	Schalke 04	2–3	Eintracht Frankfurt	Gelsenkirchen
15:30 CEST (UTC+2)	Oliver Held 5'; Hami Mandıralı 14'		Jan Åge Fjørtoft 24'; Thomas Sobotzik (P) 54'; Olaf Janßen 75'	Stadium: Parkstadion; Attendance: 51,300; Referee: Markus Merk

29 May 1999 34	TSV 1860 Munich	4–5	Schalke 04	Munich
15:30 CEST (UTC+2)	Harald Cerny 4'; Bernd Hobsch 18'; Bernd Hobsch 42'; Marco Kurz 44'		Hami Mandıralı 9'; Jiří Němec 19'; Martin Max 41'; Olaf Thon 68'; Hami Mandıralı (P) 90'	Stadium: Olympiastadion; Attendance: 27,500; Referee: Michael Weiner

== Squad ==
=== Squad, appearances and goals ===
No.	Pos	Nat	Player	Total		Bundesliga		Champions League	
No.	Pos	Nat	Player	Apps	Goals	Apps	Goals	Apps	Goals
20	MF	(Czech Republic) CZE	Jiří Němec	29	2	27	2	2	0
19	MF	(Germany) GER	Mike Büskens	29	2	27	2	2	0
12	DF	(Netherlands) NED	Marco van Hoogdalem	27	1	25	1	2	0
9	FW	(Netherlands) NED	Youri Mulder	27	6	26	6	1	0
6	MF	(Germany) GER	Andreas Müller	28	1	27	1	1	0
11	FW	(Germany) GER	Martin Max	30	6	28	6	2	0
4	DF	(Germany) GER	Yves Eigenrauch	24	0	22	0	2	0
25	DF	(Netherlands) NED	Johan de Kock	21	1	20	1	1	0
2	DF	(Belgium) BEL	Nico Van Kerckhoven	24	1	22	1	2	0
16	MF	(Germany) GER	Oliver Held	21	2	21	2	0	0
1	GK	(Germany) GER	Oliver Reck	18	0	18	0	0	0
5	MF	(Germany) GER	Sven Kmetsch	20	2	18	2	2	0
10	MF	(Germany) GER	Olaf Thon (captain)	17	2	16	2	1	0
22	GK	(Germany) GER	Mathias Schober	16	0	14	0	2	0
34	MF	(Germany) GER	Ünal Alpuğan	15	1	15	1	0	0
18	FW	(Netherlands) NED	René Eijkelkamp	17	5	15	5	2	0
15	FW	(Turkey) TUR	Hami Mandıralı	22	3	22	3	0	0
23	MF	(Croatia) CRO	Filip Tapalović	18	0	18	0	0	0
7	FW	(Belgium) BEL	Michaël Goossens	13	1	12	1	1	0
3	MF	(Czech Republic) CZE	Radoslav Látal	18	0	16	0	2	0
24	MF	(Belgium) BEL	Marc Wilmots	14	2	12	1	2	1
8	MF	(Germany) GER	Ingo Anderbrügge	17	0	16	0	1	0
33		(Germany) GER	Sascha Wolf	14	3	14	3	0	0
13	GK	(Norway) NOR	Frode Grodås	2	0	2	0	0	0
17	FW	(Angola) ANG	Miguel Francisco Pereira	5	0	5	0	0	0
	MF	(Russia) RUS	Denis Klyuyev	3	0	3	0	0	0
21	DF	(Germany) GER	Mark Schierenberg	1	0	1	0	0	0
28	MF	(Germany) GER	Markus Kaya	1	0	1	0	0	0
	GK	(Germany) GER	Toni Tapalović	0	0	0	0	0	0
38	GK	(Germany) GER	Robert Wulnikowski	0	0	0	0	0	0

=== Goals ===
Pos.	Player	BL	CL	Overall
1	(Netherlands) Youri Mulder	6	0	6
1	(Germany) Martin Max	6	0	6
3	(Netherlands) René Eijkelkamp	5	0	5
4	(Turkey) Hami Mandıralı	3	0	3
4	(Germany) Sascha Wolf	3	0	3

=== Bookings ===
N	Pos.	Nat.	Name	Yellow card	Second yellow card	Red card	Notes
20	MF	(Czech Republic)	Jiří Němec	11			
19	MF	(Germany)	Mike Büskens	4	1	1	
12	DF	(Netherlands)	Marco van Hoogdalem	7	1	1	
9	FW	(Netherlands)	Youri Mulder	9		1	
6	MF	(Germany)	Andreas Müller	5			
4	DF	(Germany)	Yves Eigenrauch	1			
25	DF	(Netherlands)	Johan de Kock	4			
2	DF	(Belgium)	Nico Van Kerckhoven	5			
16	MF	(Germany)	Oliver Held	2			
5	MF	(Germany)	Sven Kmetsch	3			
10	MF	(Germany)	Olaf Thon	2			
34	MF	(Germany)	Ünal Alpuğan	2			
18	FW	(Netherlands)	René Eijkelkamp	3			
23	MF	(Croatia)	Filip Tapalović	4			
7	FW	(Belgium)	Michaël Goossens	1			
3	MF	(Czech Republic)	Radoslav Látal	2		1	
8	MF	(Germany)	Ingo Anderbrügge	1			
33		(Germany)	Sascha Wolf	3			

Only competitive matches
(yellow card) = Number of bookings; (second yellow card) = Number of sending offs after a second yellow card; (red card) = Number of sending offs by a direct red card.
