= 1999–2000 FC Schalke 04 season =

FC Schalke 04
1999–2000 season
- Manager: Huub Stevens
- Stadium: Parkstadion
- Bundesliga: 13th
- DFB-Pokal: Third round
- Top goalscorer: League: Ebbe Sand (14); All: Ebbe Sand (16)
Home colours	Away colours	Third colours

The 1999–2000 season was the 96th season in the history of FC Schalke 04 and the club's ninth consecutive season in the top flight of German football.

== Season summary ==
Schalke had a poor season, finishing in 13th place - only four points clear of relegation.

== First team squad ==
Squad at end of season

Note: Flags indicate national team as defined under FIFA eligibility rules; some limited exceptions apply. Players may hold more than one non-FIFA nationality.

No.	Pos.	Nation	Player
1	GK	GER	Oliver Reck
2	DF	BEL	Nico Van Kerckhoven
3	MF	CZE	Radoslav Látal
4	DF	GER	Yves Eigenrauch
5	MF	GER	Sven Kmetsch
6	MF	GER	Andreas Müller
8	MF	GER	Thorsten Legat
9	FW	NED	Youri Mulder
10	DF	GER	Olaf Thon
11	FW	DEN	Ebbe Sand
12	DF	NED	Marco van Hoogdalem
13	GK	NOR	Frode Grodås
14	MF	GER	Gerald Asamoah (Note: Asamoah was born in Mampong, Ghana, but was raised in Germany from the age of 12 and made his international debut for Germany in May 2001.)
15	DF	POL	Tomasz Wałdoch

No.	Pos.	Nation	Player
16	MF	GER	Oliver Held
17	MF	GER	Ünal Alpuğan
18	MF	NED	Niels Oude Kamphuis
20	MF	CZE	Jiří Němec
21	FW	BEL	Émile Mpenza
22	GK	GER	Mathias Schober
23	DF	GER	Markus Happe
24	MF	BEL	Marc Wilmots
25	DF	NED	Johan de Kock
28	MF	GER	Markus Kaya
29	GK	GER	Toni Tapalović
30	MF	HUN	Tamás Hajnal
31	MF	POR	Sérgio Pinto
32	DF	HUN	Krisztián Szollár

=== Left club during season ===
Note: Flags indicate national team as defined under FIFA eligibility rules; some limited exceptions apply. Players may hold more than one non-FIFA nationality.

No.	Pos.	Nation	Player
7	FW	BEL	Michaël Goossens (Standard Liège)
8	MF	GER	Ingo Anderbrügge (to Sportfreunde Siegen)

No.	Pos.	Nation	Player
19	MF	GER	Mike Büskens (to MSV Duisburg)

== Competitions ==
=== Bundesliga ===
==== League table ====
Pos	Team	Pld	W	D	L	GF	GA	GD	Pts
11	Borussia Dortmund	34	9	13	12	41	38	+3	40
12	SC Freiburg	34	10	10	14	45	50	−5	40
13	Schalke 04	34	8	15	11	42	44	−2	39 (Note: Head-to-head was used as a tie-breaker between Schalke 04 and Frankfurt.)
14	Eintracht Frankfurt (Note: Eintracht Frankfurt were docked two points because of licensing irregularities.)	34	12	5	17	42	44	−2	39
15	Hansa Rostock	34	8	14	12	44	60	−16	38

Source: www.dfb.de
Rules for classification: 1) points; 2) goal difference; 3) number of goals scored.
