= 2000–01 FC Schalke 04 season =

FC Schalke 04
2000–01 season
- Chairman: Gerhard Rehberg
- Manager: Huub Stevens
- Bundesliga: 2nd
- DFB-Pokal: Winners
- Top goalscorer: League: Ebbe Sand (22); All: Ebbe Sand (26)
- Average home league attendance: 46,599
Home colours	Away colours	Third colours

Schalke 04 had one of its best ever seasons, winning the German Cup. They almost won the league too, hindered only by a late Patrik Andersson free kick for Bayern Munich in stoppage time against Hamburg. Nonetheless, Schalke still qualified for the Champions League for the first time.

== Players ==
=== First-team squad ===
Squad at end of season

Note: Flags indicate national team as defined under FIFA eligibility rules; some limited exceptions apply. Players may hold more than one non-FIFA nationality.

No.	Pos.	Nation	Player
1	GK	GER	Oliver Reck
2	DF	BEL	Nico Van Kerckhoven
3	MF	CZE	Radoslav Látal
4	DF	GER	Yves Eigenrauch
5	MF	GER	Sven Kmetsch
6	DF	POL	Tomasz Hajto
7	MF	GER	Andreas Möller
8	MF	GER	Jörg Böhme
9	FW	NED	Youri Mulder
10	DF	GER	Olaf Thon
11	FW	DEN	Ebbe Sand
12	DF	NED	Marco van Hoogdalem
13	GK	NOR	Frode Grodås
14	MF	GER	Gerald Asamoah (Note: Asamoah was born in Mampong, Ghana, but was raised in Germany from the age of 12 and made his international debut for Germany in May 2001.)
15	DF	POL	Tomasz Wałdoch
16	MF	GER	Oliver Held

No.	Pos.	Nation	Player
17	MF	GER	Ünal Alpuğan
18	MF	NED	Niels Oude Kamphuis
19	MF	GER	Mike Büskens
20	MF	CZE	Jiří Němec
21	FW	BEL	Émile Mpenza
23	DF	GER	Markus Happe
25	DF	NED	Johan de Kock
26	FW	GER	Ali Göl
27	MF	GER	Benjamin Wingerter
28	DF	DEN	Sladan Peric
29	GK	GER	Toni Tapalović
30	MF	HUN	Tamás Hajnal
31	MF	GER	Thorsten Legat
32	DF	GER	Benjamin Koch
34	MF	GER	Christian Mikolajczak

=== Left club during season ===
Note: Flags indicate national team as defined under FIFA eligibility rules; some limited exceptions apply. Players may hold more than one non-FIFA nationality.

No.	Pos.	Nation	Player
22	GK	GER	Mathias Schober (to Hamburg)

== Competitions ==
=== Bundesliga ===
==== League table ====
Pos	Team	Pld	W	D	L	GF	GA	GD	Pts	Qualification or relegation
1	Bayern Munich (C)	34	19	6	9	62	37	+25	63	Qualification to Champions League group stage
2	Schalke 04	34	18	8	8	65	35	+30	62	Qualification to Champions League group stage
3	Borussia Dortmund	34	16	10	8	62	42	+20	58	Qualification to Champions League third qualifying round
4	Bayer Leverkusen	34	17	6	11	54	40	+14	57	Qualification to Champions League third qualifying round
5	Hertha BSC	34	18	2	14	58	52	+6	56	Qualification to UEFA Cup first round

Source: www.dfb.de
Rules for classification: 1) points; 2) goal difference; 3) number of goals scored.
(C) Champions

Results by Round

Round	1	2	3	4	5	6	7	8	9	10	11	12	13	14	15	16	17	18	19	20	21	22	23	24	25	26	27	28	29	30	31	32	33	34
Ground	H	A	H	A	H	A	A	H	A	H	A	H	A	H	A	H	A	A	H	A	H	A	H	H	A	H	A	H	A	H	A	H	A	H
Position	6	2	2	1	3	2	2	1	3	3	5	4	2	2	3	2	1	1	1	2	2	2	2	3	6	5	3	2	1	1	1	1	2	2

A = Away; H = Home; W = Win; D = Draw; L = Loss

==== Matches ====
- Schalke 04–Köln 2–1
- 1–0 Ebbe Sand 12'
- 2–0 Émile Mpenza 37'
- 2–1 Tomasz Hajto 88' (o.g.)
- Hansa Rostock-Schalke 04 0–4
- 0–1 Émile Mpenza 25'
- 0–2 Émile Mpenza 30'
- 0–3 Ebbe Sand 40'
- 0–4 Émile Mpenza 51'
- Schalke 04-Energie Cottbus 3–0
- 1–0 Ebbe Sand 7'
- 2–0 Ebbe Sand 8'
- 3–0 Ebbe Sand 51'
- 1860 Munich-Schalke 04 1–1
- 0–1 Émile Mpenza 53'
- 1–1 Markus Beierle 65'
- Schalke 04-Werder Bremen 1–1
- 0–1 Aílton 50'
- 1–1 Jörg Böhme 55' (pen.)
- Borussia Dortmund-Schalke 04 0–4
- 0–1 Jörg Böhme 39' (pen.)
- 0–2 Émile Mpenza 45'
- 0–3 Jörg Heinrich 60' (o.g.)
- 0–4 Ebbe Sand 76'
- Hamburg-Schalke 04 2–0
- 1–0 Marek Heinz 35'
- 2–0 Mehdi Mahdavikia 83'
- Schalke 04-Eintracht Frankfurt 4–0
- 1–0 Jörg Böhme 38'
- 2–0 Radoslav Latal 51'
- 3–0 Jörg Böhme 53'
- 4–0 Markus Happe 61'
- Freiburg-Schalke 04 3–1
- 1–0 Andreas Zeyer 33'
- 1–1 Tomasz Wałdoch 74'
- 2–1 Adel Sellimi 80'
- 3–1 Abder Ramdane 89'
- Schalke 04-Bayer Leverkusen 0–0
- Kaiserslautern-Schalke 04 3–2
- 0–1 Ebbe Sand 37'
- 0–2 Tomasz Wałdoch 56'
- 1–2 Harry Koch 67' (pen.)
- 2–2 Miroslav Klose 71'
- 3–2 Olaf Marschall 87'
- Schalke 04-Bayern Munich 3–2
- 0–1 Giovane Élber 34'
- 1–1 Andreas Möller 58'
- 1–2 Paulo Sérgio 59'
- 2–2 Gerald Asamoah 68'
- 3–2 Ebbe Sand 71'
- Hertha Berlin-Schalke 04 0–4
- 0–1 Ebbe Sand 4'
- 0–2 Ebbe Sand 18'
- 0–3 Jörg Böhme 81'
- 0–4 Ebbe Sand 87'
- Schalke 04-Bochum 2–1
- 1–0 Youri Mulder 37'
- 1–1 Marijo Marić 48'
- 2–1 Ebbe Sand 64'
- Wolfsburg-Schalke 04 2–0
- 1–0 Claus Thomsen 55'
- 2–0 Charles Akonnor 89'
- Schalke 04-Stuttgart 2–1
- 1–0 Radoslav Latal 22'
- 1–1 Ioan Ganea 47'
- 2–1 Tomasz Wałdoch 90'
- Unterhaching-Schalke 04 0–2
- 0–1 Ebbe Sand 26'
- 0–2 Marco van Hoogdalem 60'
- Köln-Schalke 04 2–2
- 0–1 Jörg Böhme 12'
- 0–2 Gerald Asamoah 34'
- 1–2 Georgi Donkov 72'
- 2–2 Carsten Cullmann 75'
- Schalke 04-Hansa Rostock 2–0
- 1–0 Jörg Böhme 4'
- 2–0 Jiří Němec 66'
- Energie Cottbus-Schalke 04 4–1
- 1–0 Vasile Miriuță 1'
- 2–0 Sebastian Helbig 42'
- 2–1 Ebbe Sand 54'
- 3–1 Andrzej Kobylański 71'
- 4–1 Antun Labak 74'
- Schalke 04-1860 Munich 2–0
- 1–0 Émile Mpenza 50'
- 2–0 Émile Mpenza 65'
- Werder Bremen-Schalke 04 2–1
- 1–0 Claudio Pizarro 16'
- 2–0 Fabian Ernst 26'
- 2–1 Ebbe Sand 66'
- Schalke 04-Borussia Dortmund 0–0
- Schalke 04-Hamburg 0–1
- 0–1 Erik Meijer 87'
- Eintracht Frankfurt-Schalke 04 0–0
- Schalke 04-Freiburg 0–0
- Bayer Leverkusen-Schalke 04 0–3
- 0–1 Boris Živković 19' (o.g.)
- 0–2 Émile Mpenza 51'
- 0–3 Gerald Asamoah 54'
- Schalke 04–Kaiserslautern 5–1
- 1–0 Tomasz Wałdoch 3'
- 2–0 Tomasz Wałdoch 9'
- 3–0 Ebbe Sand 55'
- 3–1 Miroslav Klose 72'
- 4–1 Émile Mpenza 87'
- 5–1 Ebbe Sand 89'
- Bayern Munich-Schalke 04 1–3
- 1–0 Carsten Jancker 3'
- 1–1 Ebbe Sand 14'
- 1–2 Ebbe Sand 48'
- 1–3 Ebbe Sand 75'
- Schalke 04-Hertha Berlin 3–1
- 0–1 Sebastian Deisler 34'
- 1–1 Marco van Hoogdalem 79'
- 2–1 Émile Mpenza 86'
- Bochum-Schalke 04 1–1
- 1–0 Paul Freier 21'
- 1–1 Émile Mpenza 70'
- Schalke 04-Wolfsburg 2–1
- 1–0 Ebbe Sand 31'
- 2–0 Émile Mpenza 34'
- 2–1 Andrzej Juskowiak 89'
- Stuttgart-Schalke 04 1–0
- 1–0 Krassimir Balakov 90'
- Schalke 04-Unterhaching 5–3
- 0–1 André Breitenreiter 4'
- 0–2 Mirosław Spiżak 27'
- 1–2 Nico van Kerckhoven 44'
- 2–2 Gerald Asamoah 45'
- 2–3 Jan Seifert 70'
- 3–3 Jörg Böhme 73'
- 4–3 Jörg Böhme 74'
- 5–3 Ebbe Sand 89'

== Statistics ==
=== Top scorers ===
==== Bundesliga ====
- (Denmark) Ebbe Sand 22
- (Belgium) Émile Mpenza 13
- (Germany) Jörg Böhme 9
- (Poland) Tomasz Wałdoch 5

== Transfers ==
=== In ===
- Andreas Möller - Borussia Dortmund
- Tomasz Hajto - MSV Duisburg
- Jörg Böhme - Arminia Bielefeld

=== Out ===
- Andreas Müller - retired
