= 2001–02 FC Schalke 04 season =

Schalke 04
2001–02 season
- Chairman: Gerhard Rehberg
- Manager: Huub Stevens
- Bundesliga: 5th
- Champions League: First group stage
- DFB-Pokal: Winners
- Top goalscorer: League: Ebbe Sand (11); All: Ebbe Sand (16)
Home colours	Away colours	Third colours

FC Schalke 04 failed to challenge for the Bundesliga title, and did not make it past the group stage in the Champions League, resulting in coach Huub Stevens resigning following the end of the season. A consolation prize was winning the German Cup following a dramatic 4–2 victory over Bayer Leverkusen.

== First-team squad ==
=== Goalkeepers ===
- (Germany) Oliver Reck
- (Norway) Frode Grodås
- (Germany) Christoph Heimeroth
- (Croatia) Toni Tapalović

=== Defenders ===
- (Poland) Tomasz Hajto
- (Poland) Tomasz Wałdoch
- (Argentina) Anibal Matellán
- (Netherlands) Marco van Hoogdalem
- (Germany) Markus Happe

=== Midfielders ===
- (Germany) Jörg Böhme
- (Germany) Andreas Möller
- (Belgium) Sven Vermant
- (Belgium) Nico van Kerckhoven
- (Germany) Sven Kmetsch
- (Czech Republic) Jiří Němec
- (Serbia and Montenegro) Kristijan Djordjević
- (Germany) Olaf Thon
- (Germany) Mike Büskens
- (Belgium) Marc Wilmots

=== Attackers ===
- (Nigeria) Victor Agali
- (Belgium) Émile Mpenza
- (Germany) Gerald Asamoah
- (Netherlands) Youri Mulder
- (Germany) Mike Hanke
- (Denmark) Ebbe Sand

== Competitions ==
=== Bundesliga ===
==== League table ====
Pos	Team	Pld	W	D	L	GF	GA	GD	Pts	Qualification or relegation
3	Bayern Munich	34	20	8	6	65	25	+40	68	Qualification to Champions League third qualifying round
4	Hertha BSC	34	18	7	9	61	38	+23	61	Qualification to UEFA Cup first round
5	Schalke 04	34	18	7	9	52	36	+16	61	Qualification to UEFA Cup first round
6	Werder Bremen	34	17	5	12	54	43	+11	56	Qualification to UEFA Cup first round
7	1. FC Kaiserslautern	34	17	5	12	62	53	+9	56	Qualification to Intertoto Cup third round

Source: bundesliga.de
Rules for classification: 1) points; 2) goal difference; 3) number of goals scored.

==== Matches ====
- Bayern Munich-Schalke 04 3–0
- 1–0 Claudio Pizarro (6)
- 2–0 Mehmet Scholl (13)
- 3–0 Niko Kovač (39)
- Mönchengladbach-Schalke 04 0–0
- Schalke 04-Bayer Leverkusen 3–3
- 1–0 Tomasz Hajto (10)
- 2–0 Jörg Böhme (40 pen)
- 2–1 Michael Ballack (58)
- 2–2 Ulf Kirsten (73)
- 3–2 Émile Mpenza (80)
- 3–3 Bernd Schneider (90 + 1)
- Schalke 04-Hansa Rostock 3–1
- 1–0 Andreas Jakobsson (9 og)
- 1–1 Rayk Schröder (44)
- 2–1 Victor Agali (60)
- 3–1 Jörg Böhme (89 pen)
- St. Pauli-Schalke 04 0–2
- 0–1 Victor Agali (35)
- 0–2 Victor Agali (77)
- Schalke 04-Borussia Dortmund 1–0
- 1–0 Andreas Möller (17)
- Freiburg-Schalke 04 2–0
- 1–0 Tomasz Hajto (55 og)
- 2–0 Ibrahim Tanko (68)
- Schalke 04-Energie Cottbus 2–0
- 1–0 Émile Mpenza (19)
- 2–0 Gerald Asamoah (33)
- Stuttgart-Schalke 04 3–0
- 1–0 Marcelo Bordon (35)
- 2–0 Ioan Ganea (52)
- 3–0 Alexander Hleb (54)
- Schalke 04-1860 Munich 1–0
- 1–0 Simon Jentzsch (13 og)
- Kaiserslautern-Schalke 04 0–0
- Schalke 04–Köln 3–1
- 0–1 Andrew Sinkala (37)
- 1–1 Ebbe Sand (45 + 1)
- 2–1 Andreas Möller (54)
- 3–1 Gerald Asamoah (80)
- Hamburg-Schalke 04 0–0
- Schalke 04-Werder Bremen 1–4
- 0–1 Marco Bode (20)
- 0–2 Ailton (28)
- 0–3 Krisztián Lisztes (49)
- 0–4 Viktor Skrypnyk (51 pen)
- 1–4 Ebbe Sand (58)
- Nürnberg-Schalke 04 0–3
- 0–1 Tomasz Hajto (61 pen)
- 0–2 Ebbe Sand (90 + 1)
- 0–3 Ebbe Sand (90 + 3)
- Schalke 04-Hertha Berlin 0–0
- Wolfsburg-Schalke 04 3–1
- 1–0 Jiří Němec (51 og)
- 2–0 Tomislav Marić (61)
- 2–1 Marc Wilmots (66)
- 3–1 Tomislav Marić (74)
- Hansa Rostock-Schalke 04 1–3
- 0–1 Marc Wilmots (17)
- 0–2 Ebbe Sand (26)
- 1–2 Kai Oswald (70)
- 1–3 Marc Wilmots (75)
- Schalke 04-Bayern Munich 5–1
- 1–0 Émile Mpenza (34)
- 2–0 Ebbe Sand (35)
- 2–1 Mehmet Scholl (49)
- 3–1 Jörg Böhme (54)
- 4–1 Marco van Hoogdalem (75)
- 5–1 Niels Oude Kamphuis (90 + 1)
- Schalke 04-Mönchengladbach 2–0
- 1–0 Marc Wilmots (1)
- 2–0 Gerald Asamoah (90 + 1)
- Bayer Leverkusen-Schalke 04 0–1
- 0–1 Jörg Böhme (52)
- Schalke 04-St. Pauli 4–0
- 1–0 Ebbe Sand (9)
- 2–0 Andreas Möller (25)
- 3–0 Jörg Böhme (54 pen)
- 4–0 Oliver Reck (80 pen)
- Borussia Dortmund-Schalke 04 1–1
- 0–1 Niels Oude Kamphuis (17)
- 1–1 Ewerthon (50)
- Schalke 04-Freiburg 3–0
- 1–0 Jörg Böhme (15)
- 2–0 Gerald Asamoah (37)
- 3–0 Marc Wilmots (39)
- Energie Cottbus-Schalke 04 2–0
- 1–0 Vasile Miriuță (37 pen)
- 2–0 Radosław Kałużny (90 + 1)
- Schalke 04-Stuttgart 2–1
- 1–0 Tomasz Wałdoch (60)
- 1–1 Adhemar (78)
- 2–1 Ebbe Sand (90)
- 1860 Munich-Schalke 04 1–2
- 0–1 Gerald Asamoah (3)
- 1–1 Paul Agostino (81)
- 1–2 Ebbe Sand (83)
- Schalke 04–Kaiserslautern 3–0
- 1–0 Marc Wilmots (45)
- 2–0 Andreas Möller (59)
- 3–0 Victor Agali (81)
- Köln-Schalke 04 1–1
- 0–1 Ebbe Sand (40)
- 1–1 Dirk Lottner (60)
- Schalke 04-Hamburg 2–0
- 1–0 Émile Mpenza (8)
- 2–0 Ebbe Sand (41)
- Werder Bremen-Schalke 04 3–0
- 1–0 Frank Baumann (24)
- 2–0 Ailton (63)
- 3–0 Torsten Frings (77)
- Schalke 04–Nürnberg 2–1
- 1–0 Jörg Böhme (54)
- 1–1 Jacek Krzynówek (62)
- 2–1 Tomasz Wałdoch (66)
- Hertha Berlin-Schalke 04 2–0
- 1–0 Michael Preetz (50)
- 2–0 Alex Alves (55)
- Schalke 04-Wolfsburg 1–2
- 0–1 Tomislav Marić (30)
- 0–2 Tomislav Marić (81)
- 1–2 Gerald Asamoah (90)

=== UEFA Champions League ===
==== First group stage ====
Pos	Team	Pld	W	D	L	GF	GA	GD	Pts	Qualification	PAN	ARS	MLL	SCH
1	(Greece) Panathinaikos	6	4	0	2	8	3	+5	12	Advance to second group stage	—	1–0	2–0	2–0
2	(England) Arsenal	6	3	0	3	9	9	0	9	Advance to second group stage	2–1	—	3–1	3–2
3	(Spain) Mallorca	6	3	0	3	4	9	−5	9	Transfer to UEFA Cup	1–0	1–0	—	0–4
4	(Germany) Schalke 04	6	2	0	4	9	9	0	6		0–2	3–1	0–1	—

Source: RSSSF
- Schalke 04-Panathinaikos 0–2
- 0–1 Goran Vlaović (75)
- 0–2 Angelos Basinas (80)
- Arsenal-Schalke 04 3–2
- 1–0 Thierry Henry (32)
- 2–0 Freddie Ljungberg (35)
- 2–1 Marco van Hoogdalem (43)
- 3–1 Thierry Henry (47 pen)
- 3–2 Émile Mpenza (59)
- Schalke 04-Mallorca 0–1
- Mallorca-Schalke 04 0–4
- 0–1 Marco van Hoogdalem (15)
- 0–2 Tomasz Hajto (22 pen)
- 0–3 Gerald Asamoah (77)
- 0–4 Ebbe Sand (84)
- Panathinaikos-Schalke 04 2–0
- 1–0 Emmanuel Olisadebe (31)
- 2–0 Michalis Konstantinou (60)
- Schalke 04-Arsenal 3–1
- 1–0 Youri Mulder (2)
- 2–0 Sven Vermant (60)
- 3–0 Andreas Möller (64)
- 3–1 Sylvain Wiltord (71)

== Statistics ==
=== Top scorers ===
==== Bundesliga ====
- (Denmark) Ebbe Sand 11
- (Germany) Jörg Böhme 7
- (Germany) Gerald Asamoah 6
- (Belgium) Marc Wilmots 4
- (Nigeria) Victor Agali 4
- (Belgium) Émile Mpenza 4

== Kits ==
Home	Away	Third	Cup Final
