= 2002 DFB-Pokal final =

- Match programme cover
- Event: 2001–02 DFB-Pokal
Schalke 04	Bayer Leverkusen
4	2
- Date: 11 May 2002
- Venue: Olympiastadion, Berlin
- Referee: Franz-Xaver Wack (Biberbach)
- Attendance: 70,000
- Weather: Clear; 17 °C (63 °F); 77% humidity

The 2002 DFB-Pokal final decided the winner of the 2001–02 DFB-Pokal, the 59th season of Germany's premier knockout football cup competition. It was played on 11 May 2002 at the Olympiastadion in Berlin. Schalke 04 won the match 4–2 against Bayer Leverkusen to claim their 4th cup title.

== Route to the final ==
The DFB-Pokal began with 64 teams in a single-elimination knockout cup competition. There were a total of five rounds leading up to the final. Teams were drawn against each other, and the winner after 90 minutes would advance. If still tied, 30 minutes of extra time was played. If the score was still level, a penalty shoot-out was used to determine the winner.

Note: In all results below, the score of the finalist is given first (H: home; A: away).

Schalke 04		Round	Bayer Leverkusen
Opponent	Result	2001–02 DFB-Pokal	Opponent	Result
SC Freiburg Amateure (A)	1–0	Round 1	Jahn Regensburg (A)	3–0
Arminia Bielefeld (A)	2–1	Round 2	VfL Bochum (A)	3–2
Darmstadt 98 (A)	1–0 (a.e.t.)	Round of 16	Hannover 96 (A)	2–1
Rot-Weiß Oberhausen (H)	2–0	Quarter-finals	1860 Munich (H)	3–0
Bayern Munich (H)	2–0 (a.e.t.)	Semi-finals	1. FC Köln (H)	3–1 (a.e.t.)

== Match details ==
11 May 2002
19:45 CEST

Schalke 04	4–2	Bayer Leverkusen
Böhme 45'; Agali 68'; Möller 71'; Sand 85'	Report	Berbatov 27'; Kirsten 89'

Olympiastadion, Berlin
Attendance: 70,000
Referee: Franz-Xaver Wack (Biberbach)

Schalke 04	Bayer Leverkusen

GK	1	(Germany) Oliver Reck	(yellow card) 43'
RB	12	(Netherlands) Marco van Hoogdalem	(yellow card) 31'
CB	15	(Poland) Tomasz Wałdoch (c)
CB	6	(Poland) Tomasz Hajto		(substituted off) 46'
LB	2	(Belgium) Nico Van Kerckhoven
DM	20	(Czech Republic) Jiří Němec	(yellow card) 82'
RM	14	(Germany) Gerald Asamoah		(substituted off) 81'
LM	8	(Germany) Jörg Böhme	(yellow card) 28'
AM	7	(Germany) Andreas Möller		(substituted off) 75'
CF	11	(Denmark) Ebbe Sand
CF	22	(Nigeria) Victor Agali	(red card) 90'
Substitutes:
GK	13	(Norway) Frode Grodås
DF	3	(Argentina) Aníbal Matellán
MF	16	(Federal Republic of Yugoslavia) Kristijan Đorđević
MF	17	(Belgium) Sven Vermant		(substituted in) 81'
MF	18	(Netherlands) Niels Oude Kamphuis		(substituted in) 46'
MF	19	(Germany) Mike Büskens
MF	24	(Belgium) Marc Wilmots		(substituted in) 75'
Manager:
(Netherlands) Huub Stevens (Note: Huub Stevens was expelled by the referee in the 45th minute.)

GK	1	(Germany) Hans-Jörg Butt
RB	6	(Croatia) Boris Živković
CB	19	(Brazil) Lúcio
CB	28	(Germany) Carsten Ramelow (c)	(yellow card) 16'
LB	35	(Argentina) Diego Placente
RM	25	(Germany) Bernd Schneider
CM	13	(Germany) Michael Ballack
LM	8	(Brazil) Zé Roberto
AM	10	(Turkey) Yıldıray Baştürk	(yellow card) 20'
CF	12	(Bulgaria) Dimitar Berbatov	(yellow card) 63'	(substituted off) 77'
CF	27	(Germany) Oliver Neuville		(substituted off) 67'
Substitutes:
GK	20	(Australia) Frank Juric
DF	26	(Germany) Zoltán Sebescen
DF	47	(Germany) Thomas Kleine
MF	3	(Croatia) Marko Babić
MF	15	(Croatia) Jurica Vranješ
FW	9	(Germany) Ulf Kirsten		(substituted in) 77'
FW	23	(Germany) Thomas Brdarić	(yellow card) 90+1'	(substituted in) 67'
Manager:
(Germany) Klaus Toppmöller (Note: Klaus Toppmöller was expelled by the referee in the 61st minute.)

Assistant referees:
Günter Perl (Pullach)
Jan-Hendrik Salver (Stuttgart)

Match rules

- 90 minutes.
- 30 minutes of extra time if necessary.
- Penalty shoot-out if scores still level.
- Seven named substitutes, of which up to three may be used.
