= UEFA Euro 1996 statistics =

The following article outlines statistics for UEFA Euro 1996, which took place in England from 8 to 30 June 1996. Goals scored during penalty shoot-outs are not counted, and matches decided by a penalty shoot-out are counted as draws.

== Goalscorers ==
There were 64 goals scored in 31 matches, for an average of 2.06 goals per match.

5 goals

- (England) Alan Shearer

3 goals

- (Bulgaria) Hristo Stoichkov
- (Croatia) Davor Šuker
- (Denmark) Brian Laudrup
- (Germany) Jürgen Klinsmann

2 goals

- (England) Teddy Sheringham
- (Germany) Oliver Bierhoff
- (Germany) Matthias Sammer
- (Italy) Pierluigi Casiraghi

1 goal

- (Croatia) Zvonimir Boban
- (Croatia) Goran Vlaović
- (Czech Republic) Radek Bejbl
- (Czech Republic) Patrik Berger
- (Czech Republic) Pavel Kuka
- (Czech Republic) Pavel Nedvěd
- (Czech Republic) Karel Poborský
- (Czech Republic) Vladimír Šmicer
- (Czech Republic) Jan Suchopárek
- (Denmark) Allan Nielsen
- (England) Paul Gascoigne
- (France) Laurent Blanc
- (France) Youri Djorkaeff
- (France) Christophe Dugarry
- (France) Patrice Loko
- (Germany) Stefan Kuntz
- (Germany) Andreas Möller
- (Germany) Christian Ziege
- (Italy) Enrico Chiesa
- (Netherlands) Dennis Bergkamp
- (Netherlands) Jordi Cruyff
- (Netherlands) Patrick Kluivert
- (Portugal) Fernando Couto
- (Portugal) Domingos
- (Portugal) Luís Figo
- (Portugal) João Pinto
- (Portugal) Sá Pinto
- (Romania) Florin Răducioiu
- (Russia) Vladimir Beschastnykh
- (Russia) Aleksandr Mostovoi
- (Russia) Omari Tetradze
- (Russia) Ilya Tsymbalar
- (Scotland) Ally McCoist
- (Spain) Alfonso
- (Spain) Guillermo Amor
- (Spain) José Luis Caminero
- (Spain) Javier Manjarín
- (Switzerland) Kubilay Türkyilmaz

1 own goal

- (Bulgaria) Lyuboslav Penev (against France)

== Discipline ==
Sanctions against foul play at UEFA Euro 1996 are in the first instance the responsibility of the referee, but when he deems it necessary to give a caution, or dismiss a player, UEFA keeps a record and may enforce a suspension. Referee decisions are generally seen as final. However, UEFA's disciplinary committee may additionally penalise players for offences unpunished by the referee.

=== Overview ===
==== Red cards ====
A player receiving a red card is automatically suspended for the next match. A longer suspension is possible if the UEFA disciplinary committee judges the offence as warranting it. In keeping with the FIFA Disciplinary Code (FDC) and UEFA Disciplinary Regulations (UDR), UEFA does not allow for appeals of red cards except in the case of mistaken identity. The FDC further stipulates that if a player is sent off during his team's final Euro 1996 match, the suspension carries over to his team's next competitive international(s). For Euro 1996 these were the qualification matches for the 1998 FIFA World Cup.

Any player who was suspended due to a red card that was earned in Euro 1996 qualifying was required to serve the balance of any suspension unserved by the end of qualifying either in the Euro 1996 finals (for any player on a team that qualified, whether he had been selected to the final squad or not) or in World Cup qualifying (for players on teams that did not qualify).

==== Yellow cards ====
Any player receiving a single yellow card during two of the three group stage matches plus the quarter-final match was suspended for the next match. A single yellow card does not carry over to the semi-finals. This means that no player will be suspended for final unless he gets sent off in semi-final or he is serving a longer suspension for an earlier incident. Suspensions due to yellow cards will not carry over to the World Cup qualifiers. Yellow cards and any related suspensions earned in the Euro 1996 qualifiers are neither counted nor enforced in the final tournament.

In the event a player is sent off for two bookable offences, only the red card is counted for disciplinary purposes. However, in the event a player receives a direct red card after being booked in the same match, then both cards are counted. If the player was already facing a suspension for two tournament bookings when he was sent off, this would result in separate suspensions that would be served consecutively. The one match ban for the yellow cards would be served first unless the player's team is eliminated in the match in which he was sent off. If the player's team is eliminated in the match in which he was serving his ban for the yellow cards, then the ban for the sending off would be carried over to the World Cup qualifiers.

==== Additional punishment ====
For serious transgressions, a longer suspension may be handed down at the discretion of the UEFA disciplinary committee. The disciplinary committee is also charged with reviewing any incidents that were missed by the officials and can award administrative red cards and suspensions accordingly. However, just as appeals of red cards are not considered, the disciplinary committee is also not allowed to review transgressions that were already punished by the referee with something less than a red card. For example, if a player is booked but not sent off for a dangerous tackle, the disciplinary committee cannot subsequently deem the challenge to be violent conduct and then upgrade the card to a red. However, if the same player then spits at the opponent but is still not sent off, then the referee's report would be unlikely to mention this automatic red card offence. Video evidence of the spitting incident could then be independently reviewed.

Unlike the rules in many domestic competitions, there is no particular category of red card offence that automatically results in a multi-game suspension. In general however, extended bans are only assessed for red cards given for serious foul play, violent conduct, spitting or perhaps foul and abusive language. Also, unlike many sets of domestic rules second and subsequent red cards also do not automatically incur an extended ban, although a player's past disciplinary record (including prior competition) might be considered by the disciplinary committee when punishing him. As a rule, only automatic red card offenses are considered for longer bans. A player who gets sent off for picking up two yellow cards in the same match will not have his automatic one-match ban extended by UEFA on account of what he did to get the second booking, because the referee has deemed him as not to have committed an automatic red card offense.

If UEFA suspends a player after his team's elimination from the tournament, or for more games than the team ends up playing without him prior to the final or their elimination (whichever comes first), then the remaining suspension must be served during World Cup qualifying. For a particularly grave offence UEFA has the power to impose a lengthy ban against the offender.

=== By individual ===
==== Red cards ====
Seven red cards were shown over the course of the tournament's 31 matches, an average of 0.23 red cards per match.

1 red card

- (Bulgaria) Petar Hubchev
- (Croatia) Igor Štimac
- (Czech Republic) Radoslav Látal
- (Germany) Thomas Strunz
- (Italy) Luigi Apolloni
- (Russia) Yuri Kovtun
- (Spain) Juan Antonio Pizzi

==== Yellow cards ====
153 yellow cards were shown over the course of the tournament's 31 matches, an average of 4.94 yellow cards per match

3 yellow cards

- (Czech Republic) Pavel Nedvěd

2 yellow cards

- (Bulgaria) Radostin Kishishev
- (Czech Republic) Radek Bejbl
- (Czech Republic) Miroslav Kadlec
- (Czech Republic) Pavel Kuka
- (Czech Republic) Jan Suchopárek
- (Denmark) Thomas Helveg
- (England) Paul Ince
- (England) Gary Neville
- (France) Christian Karembeu
- (Germany) Markus Babbel
- (Germany) Andreas Möller
- (Germany) Stefan Reuter
- (Germany) Matthias Sammer
- (Germany) Christian Ziege
- (Netherlands) Edgar Davids
- (Portugal) João Pinto
- (Portugal) Ricardo Sá Pinto
- (Portugal) Paulinho Santos
- (Romania) Adrian Ilie
- (Scotland) John Collins
- (Spain) Abelardo
- (Switzerland) Marco Grassi
- (Switzerland) Ramon Vega
- (Turkey) Tolunay Kafkas

1 yellow card

- (Bulgaria) Trifon Ivanov
- (Bulgaria) Emil Kremenliev
- (Bulgaria) Hristo Stoichkov
- (Bulgaria) Tsanko Tsvetanov
- (Bulgaria) Trifon Ivanov
- (Croatia) Aljoša Asanović
- (Croatia) Zvonimir Boban
- (Croatia) Robert Jarni
- (Croatia) Nikola Jurčević
- (Croatia) Igor Pamić
- (Croatia) Robert Prosinečki
- (Croatia) Mario Stanić
- (Croatia) Goran Vlaović
- (Czech Republic) Radek Drulák
- (Czech Republic) Michal Horňák
- (Czech Republic) Luboš Kubík
- (Czech Republic) Radoslav Látal
- (Czech Republic) Jiří Němec
- (Czech Republic) Vladimír Šmicer
- (Czech Republic) Václav Němeček
- (Denmark) Henrik Larsen
- (Denmark) Jens Risager
- (Denmark) Allan Nielsen
- (England) Tony Adams
- (England) Paul Gascoigne
- (England) Alan Shearer
- (England) Teddy Sheringham
- (England) Gareth Southgate
- (France) Laurent Blanc
- (France) Marcel Desailly
- (France) Didier Deschamps
- (France) Éric Di Meco
- (France) Youri Djorkaeff
- (France) Christoph Dugarry
- (France) Bixente Lizarazu
- (France) Alain Roche
- (France) Lillian Thuram
- (Germany) Oliver Bierhoff
- (Germany) Thomas Häßler
- (Germany) Thomas Helmer
- (Germany) Jürgen Klinsmann
- (Germany) Stefan Kuntz
- (Italy) Demetrio Albertini
- (Italy) Pierluigi Casiraghi
- (Italy) Roberto Donadoni
- (Netherlands) Dennis Bergkamp
- (Netherlands) Danny Blind
- (Netherlands) Winston Bogarde
- (Netherlands) Johan de Kock
- (Netherlands) Patrick Kluivert
- (Netherlands) Clarence Seedorf
- (Netherlands) Gaston Taument
- (Netherlands) Frank de Boer
- (Netherlands) Aron Winter
- (Netherlands) Richard Witschge
- (Portugal) Luís Figo
- (Portugal) Hélder
- (Portugal) Oceano
- (Portugal) Carlos Secretário
- (Portugal) Paulo Sousa
- (Portugal) José Tavares
- (Romania) Constantin Gâlcă
- (Romania) Gheorghe Hagi
- (Romania) Gheorghe Mihali
- (Romania) Gheorghe Popescu
- (Romania) Tibor Selymes
- (Russia) Andrei Kanchelskis
- (Russia) Igor Kolyvanov
- (Russia) Yuri Kovtun
- (Russia) Yuri Nikiforov
- (Russia) Viktor Onopko
- (Russia) Vladislav Radimov
- (Russia) Ilia Tsymbalar
- (Russia) Igor Yanovskiy
- (Scotland) Tom Boyd
- (Scotland) Colin Calderwood
- (Scotland) Kevin Gallacher
- (Scotland) Colin Hendry
- (Scotland) Stuart McCall
- (Scotland) John Spencer
- (Spain) Alfonso
- (Spain) José Emilio Amavisca
- (Spain) Guillermo Amor
- (Spain) Alberto Belsúe
- (Spain) José Luis Caminero
- (Spain) Kiko
- (Spain) Luis Enrique
- (Spain) Miguel Ángel Nadal
- (Spain) Jorge Otero
- (Switzerland) Stéphane Chapuisat
- (Switzerland) Sébastien Fournier
- (Switzerland) Alain Geiger
- (Switzerland) Sébastien Jeanneret
- (Switzerland) Yvan Quentin
- (Switzerland) Kubilay Türkyilmaz
- (Switzerland) Johann Vogel
- (Switzerland) Raphaël Wicky
- (Turkey) Abdullah Ercan
- (Turkey) Vedat İnceefe
- (Turkey) Tugay Kerimoğlu
- (Turkey) Tayfun Korkut
- (Turkey) Rüştü Reçber
- (Turkey) Rahim Zafer

=== By referee ===
Referee	Matches	Red	Yellow	Red cards
(Scotland) Leslie Mottram	3	0	16	
(Italy) Piero Ceccarini	2	2	9	2 straight reds
(Germany) Hellmut Krug	2	1	12	
(Spain) Antonio López Nieto	2	1	10	1 second yellow
(Sweden) Leif Sundell	2	1	6	
(Hungary) Sándor Puhl	2	0	10	
(France) Marc Batta	2	0	9	
(Denmark) Kim Milton Nielsen	1	1	4	1 straight red
(Belgium) Guy Goethals	1	1	2	1 straight red
(England) David Elleray	1	0	10	
(England) Paul Durkin	1	0	7	
(Czech Republic) Václav Krondl	1	0	7	
(Netherlands) Mario van der Ende	1	0	7	
(Turkey) Ahmet Çakar	1	0	6	
(Spain) Manuel Díaz Vega	1	0	6	
(Sweden) Anders Frisk	1	0	6	
(Austria) Gerd Grabher	1	0	6	
(Belarus) Vadim Zhuk	1	0	6	
(Russia) Nikolai Levnikov	1	0	5	
(Italy) Pierluigi Pairetto	1	0	5	
(Bulgaria) Atanas Uzunov	1	0	5	
(England) Dermot Gallagher	1	0	4	
(Switzerland) Serge Muhmenthaler	1	0	4	
(Germany) Bernd Heynemann	1	0	3	
(Denmark) Peter Mikkelsen	1	0	2	

=== By team ===
Team	Matches	Red	Yellow	Red Cards	Suspensions
Czech Republic	6	1	18	R. Látal vs Portugal (quarter-final)	M. Kadlec vs Russia; R. Látal vs France (semi-final); R. Bejbl vs France (semi-final); P. Kuka vs France (semi-final); J. Suchopárek vs France (semi-final)
Germany	6	1	14	T. Strunz vs Italy	Markus Babbel vs Italy; T. Strunz vs Croatia (quarter-final); A. Möller vs Czech Republic (final); S. Reuter vs Czech Republic (final); M. Sammer vs Armenia (WCQ)
Spain	4	1	12	J. A. Pizzi vs Bulgaria	J. A. Pizzi vs France; Abelardo vs Faroe Islands (WCQ)
Croatia	4	1	10	I. Štimac vs Germany (quarter-final)	I. Štimac vs Bosnia and Herzegovina (WCQ)
Russia	3	1	8	Y. Kovtun vs Germany	Y. Kovtun vs Czech Republic
Bulgaria	3	1	7	P. Hubchev vs Spain	P. Hubchev vs Romania; R. Kishishiev vs Israel (WCQ)
Italy	4	1	3	L. Apolloni vs Czech Republic	L. Apolloni vs Germany
Portugal	4	0	12		P. Santos vs Croatia; J. Pinto vs Armenia (WCQ); R. Sá Pinto vs Armenia (WCQ)
Switzerland	3	0	12		M. Grassi vs Scotland; R. Vega vs Azerbaijan (WCQ)
France	5	0	11		C. Karembeu
England	5	0	9		P. Ince vs Spain (quarter-final); G. Neville vs Germany (semi-final)
Netherlands	4	0	9		
Scotland	3	0	8		J. Collins vs Austria (WCQ)
Turkey	3	0	8		T. Kafkas vs Denmark
Romania	3	0	7		A. Ilie vs Lithuania (WCQ)
Denmark	3	0	3		T. Helveg vs Slovenia (WCQ)
