= Sven Kmetsch =

German footballer (born 1970)

Personal information
- Date of birth: 13 August 1970 (age 56)
- Place of birth: Bautzen, East Germany
- Height: 1.78 m (5 ft 10 in)
- Position: Defensive midfielder

Team information
- Current team: Schalke 04 II (assistant)

Youth career
- 1975–1978: Motor Großdubrau
- 1978–1981: Motor Bautzen
- 1981–1989: Dynamo Dresden

Senior career*
Years	Team	Apps	(Gls)
1988–1989	Dynamo Dresden II	12	(1)
1989–1995	Dynamo Dresden	102	(7)
1989–1990	→ TSG Meißen	7	(0)
1990	→ Stahl Riesa (loan)	5	(0)
1995–1998	Hamburger SV	80	(4)
1998–2005	Schalke 04	88	(2)
Total		314	(14)

International career
1997–1998	Germany	2	(0)

Managerial career
- 2005–2010: Schalke 04 II
- 2008: Schalke 04 II
- 2010–2011: FC Ingolstadt 04 (assistant)
- 2012–2015: FSV Frankfurt (assistant)
- 2015–2016: 1860 Munich (assistant)
- 2016–: Schalke 04 II (assistant)
- * Club domestic league appearances and goals

Sven Kmetsch (born 13 August 1970) is a German former professional footballer who played as a defensive midfielder. He is the assistant manager of Schalke 04 II.

== Club career ==
Kmetsch was born in Bautzen, Saxony. Including his youth career, he spent 14 years at Dynamo Dresden, winning the double in his penultimate season before German reunification, with one of his midfield teammates being Matthias Sammer. After combining East and West German football in the summer of 1991, he would play with the team four consecutive years in the Bundesliga, his competition debut coming on 14 September 1991, in a 3–0 home win against SG Wattenscheid 09.

After Dynamo's double relegation in 1995, Kmetsch spent three seasons with Hamburger SV, enjoying his best year in 1996–97 – 32 games, four goals – but his team could only rank 13th. He subsequently signed for FC Schalke 04, where he would win two consecutive German Cups, being however mostly a backup player during his seven-year spell.

After no appearances whatsoever from 2003 to 2005 combined, Kmetsch retired, having various spells as coach of Schalke's second team. After being released in early 2010, he held talks with TSV Germania Windeck and Bayer Leverkusen II to join Heiko Scholz's coaching staff.

== International career ==
Kmetsch gained two caps for Germany, his debut coming on 10 September 1997, in a 1998 FIFA World Cup qualifier against Armenia, in Dortmund: at half-time, with the score at 0–0 (eventually 4–0), he was replaced by another débutant, Lars Ricken.

His second and final appearance (another start, in a 2–0 win) was made five months later, in a friendly with Oman.

== Career statistics ==
=== Club ===
Appearances and goals by club, season and competition
Club	Season	League			National cup		Total	
Club	Season	Division	Apps	Goals	Apps	Goals	Apps	Goals
Dynamo Dresden	1988–89	DDR-Oberliga	1	0	0	0	1	0
Dynamo Dresden	1989–90	DDR-Oberliga	2	0	1	0	3	0
Dynamo Dresden	1990–91	NOFV-Oberliga	6	1	1	0	7	1
Dynamo Dresden	1991–92	Bundesliga	30	3	3	1	33	4
Dynamo Dresden	1992–93	Bundesliga	34	1	2	1	36	2
Dynamo Dresden	1993–94	Bundesliga	27	2	5	0	32	2
Dynamo Dresden	1994–95	Bundesliga	2	0	0	0	2	0
Dynamo Dresden	Total		102	7	12	2	114	9
Dynamo Dresden II	1988–89	Liga B	10	1	0	0	10	1
TSG Meißen (loan)	1989–90	Liga B	7	0	0	0	7	0
BSG Stahl Riesa (loan)	1989–90	Liga B	5	0	0	0	5	0
Hamburger SV	1995–96	Bundesliga	26	0	1	0	27	0
Hamburger SV	1996–97	Bundesliga	32	4	5	0	37	4
Hamburger SV	1997–98	Bundesliga	22	0	1	0	23	0
Hamburger SV	Total		80	4	7	0	87	4
Schalke 04	1998–99	Bundesliga	18	2	2	1	20	3
Schalke 04	1999–2000	Bundesliga	24	0	1	0	25	0
Schalke 04	2000–01	Bundesliga	5	0	1	0	6	0
Schalke 04	2001–02	Bundesliga	18	0	2	0	20	0
Schalke 04	2002–03	Bundesliga	23	1	2	0	25	1
Schalke 04	Total		88	3	8	1	96	4
Career total			292	15	27	3	319	18

== Honours ==
- DDR-Oberliga: 1989–90
- FDGB-Pokal: 1989–90
- DFB-Pokal: 2000–01, 2001–02
- DFB-Ligapokal: runner-up 2001, 2002
