= Sascha Wolf =

German footballer (born 1971)

Personal information
- Date of birth: 3 September 1971 (age 55)
- Place of birth: Germany
- Position: Striker

Senior career*
Years	Team	Apps	(Gls)
–1996	DSC Wanne-Eickel		
1996–1998	FC Schalke 04	14	(3)
1999–2004	Rot-Weiss Essen		
2004–2008	Schwarz-Weiß Essen		
2008–2010	Fortuna Düsseldorf II		
2010–2011	SC Westfalia Herne		
- * Club domestic league appearances and goals

Sascha Wolf (born 3 September 1971) is a German former footballer who played as a striker.

== Early life ==
Wolf grew up in Gelsenkirchen, Germany.

== Career ==
Wolf played for German Bundesliga side FC Schalke 04.

== Personal life ==
After retiring from professional football, Wolf worked in the automotive industry.
