= Krisztián Szollár =

Hungarian footballer

Personal information
- Date of birth: 30 August 1980 (age 46)
- Place of birth: Orosháza, Hungary
- Height: 1.76 m (5 ft 9 in)
- Position: Defender

Youth career
- 1988–1994: MTK Orosháza
- 1994–1997: Ferencváros
- 1997: Vác FC
- 1998–1999: Schalke 04

Senior career*
Years	Team	Apps	(Gls)
1999–2002	Schalke 04	1	(0)
1999–2005	Schalke 04 II	99	(1)
2000–2001	→ Rot-Weiss Essen (loan)	22	(0)
2005–2006	SG Wattenscheid 09	13	(1)
2006–2007	Preußen Münster	10	(0)
2007–2009	Darmstadt 98	59	(1)
2009	Viktoria Aschaffenburg	19	(0)
2010	Germania Ober-Roden	11	(0)
2010–2011	Viktoria Aschaffenburg		
2011–2012	Rot-Weiß Darmstadt	3	(0)
- * Club domestic league appearances and goals

Krisztián Szollár (born 30 August 1980) is a Hungarian former professional footballer who played as a defender.

== Career ==
Szollár spent three seasons in the Bundesliga with FC Schalke 04.

== Personal life ==
He also holds German citizenship.
