= Benjamin Wingerter =

German footballer

Personal information
- Date of birth: 25 March 1983 (age 43)
- Place of birth: Gelsenkirchen, West Germany
- Height: 1.75 m (5 ft 9 in)
- Position: Defensive midfielder

Youth career
- 1989–2001: Schalke 04

Senior career*
Years	Team	Apps	(Gls)
2001–2004	Schalke 04 II	76	(3)
2001–2004	Schalke 04	0	(0)
2004–2005	Union Berlin	30	(1)
2005–2009	VfR Aalen	31	(1)
2009–2013	Sportfreunde Lotte	109	(7)
2013–2015	Rot-Weiss Essen	28	(0)
2015	FC Kray	8	(1)
2015–2017	SV Horst-Emscher 08		

International career
2001–2002	Germany U19	13	(0)
2002–2003	Germany U20	15	(1)
- * Club domestic league appearances and goals

Benjamin Wingerter (born 25 March 1983) is a German former professional footballer who played as a defensive midfielder. With Rot-Weiss Essen Wingerter won the Lower Rhine Cup in 2015.
