= Markus Kaya =

German footballer

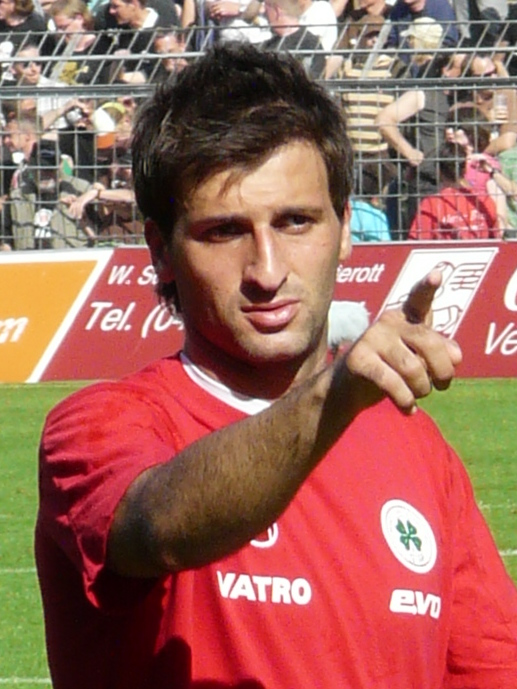
- Kaya in 2008

Personal information
- Date of birth: 20 October 1979 (age 47)
- Place of birth: West Berlin, West Germany
- Height: 1.80 m (5 ft 11 in)
- Position: Midfielder

Team information
- Current team: Schalke 04 (youth scout)

Youth career
- BSC Kickers 1900
- Hertha Zehlendorf
- –1996: Tennis Borussia Berlin
- 1996–1997: Schalke 04

Senior career*
Years	Team	Apps	(Gls)
1997–2000	Schalke 04 II		
1998–1999	Schalke 04	1	(0)
2000–2002	Rot-Weiss Essen	30	(0)
2002–2006	SSVg Velbert 02		
2007–2011	Rot-Weiß Oberhausen	131	(25)
2011–2014	SSVg Velbert 02	93	(22)
2014–2016	VfB Hüls	25	(3)

Managerial career
- 2014–2015: VfB Hüls (playing assistant)
- 2015–2017: VfB Hüls
- 2017–2020: Schalke 04 (youth)
- 2020–2023: Rot-Weiß Oberhausen (youth)
- 2023: Rot-Weiss Ahlen
- 2023–: Schalke 04 (youth scout)
- * Club domestic league appearances and goals

Markus Kaya (born 20 October 1979) is a German former professional footballer who played as a midfielder.

== Career ==
Kaya made his debut on the professional league level in the Bundesliga for FC Schalke 04 on 29 May 1999 when he came on as a substitute for Jiří Němec in the 63rd minute in a game against TSV 1860 München.

In May 2008 he scored the ARD's Goal of the Month.
