= Michaël Goossens =

Belgian footballer

Personal information
- Date of birth: 30 November 1973 (age 52)
- Place of birth: Ougrée, Belgium
- Height: 1.82 m (6 ft 0 in)
- Position: Striker

Youth career
- Tilleur
- Seraing

Senior career*
Years	Team	Apps	(Gls)
1989–1990	Seraing	6	(3)
1990–1996	Standard Liège	136	(41)
1996–1997	Genoa	36	(12)
1997–1999	Schalke 04	51	(5)
2000–2003	Standard Liège	88	(33)
2003–2004	Grazer AK	13	(0)
2004–2005	Sint-Truidense	15	(1)
2005–2006	Eupen	16	(2)
2006–2007	Bercheux		
Total		361	(97)

International career
1988	Belgium U15	2	(1)
1989–1990	Belgium U16	7	(0)
1989–1990	Belgium U17	10	(8)
1990–1991	Belgium U18	7	(3)
1991–1995	Belgium U21	13	(3)
1993–2001	Belgium	14	(1)
- * Club domestic league appearances and goals

Michaël Goossens (born 30 November 1973) is a Belgian retired professional footballer who played as a striker.

== Club career ==
Born in Ougrée, Seraing, Goossens started playing professionally with R.F.C. Seraing at the age of 16, then moved to Standard Liège. In the 1992–93 campaign he won the Young Professional Footballer of the Year award whilst, alongside Philippe Léonard and Régis Genaux, being part of The Three Musketeers generation (with Roberto Bisconti playing a smaller role), hailed for their sporting talent but with a troublesome character.

In September 1996, after helping Standard to two league runner-up places and the 1993 Belgian Cup, Goossens signed for Genoa in Italy, but only lasted there one season, as the Liguria team failed to promote from Serie B. In the following three years, he played in Germany with Schalke 04, being used sparingly during his spell and sharing team with compatriots Nico van Kerckhoven (two years) and Marc Wilmots (three).

With the Gelsenkirchen club, Goossens notably scored in the quarterfinals of the 1997–98 UEFA Cup against Inter Milan, but the defending champions were eventually ousted after losing 1–0 away and a 1–1 home draw; with three goals, he was the best scorer in European competition for Schalke, but only netted five times in two-and-a-half seasons combined in the Bundesliga.

In the 2000 January transfer window Goossens returned to Standard, exchanged for compatriot Émile Mpenza. He helped the team reach the final of the cup in 2000, regaining his previous form and scoring more than 40 official goals.

Goossens then moved abroad again, aged nearly 30, spending one season in Austria with Grazer AK, who won the first – and only – double in its history, finishing one point ahead of Austria Wien which were also the losing side in the domestic cup.

Subsequently, he returned home and played one year for Sint-Truiden, coached by former Standard and Schalke teammate Wilmots. Until his 2007 retirement, he would play in the lower and amateur leagues.

== International career ==
Goossens first played with Belgium on 13 February 1993 (aged 19), in a 3–0 win in Cyprus for the 1994 FIFA World Cup qualifiers, entering the field after 87 minutes. In the following eight years he won a further 13 caps, scoring once against Germany.

Like Genaux and Léonard, Goossens would miss the final cuts after appearing during the qualifying stages, for three World Cups – 1994, 1998 and 2002 – not being selected for UEFA Euro 2000 due to injury.

== Honours ==
Standard Liège

- Belgian Cup: 1992–93; runner-up 1999–2000
- Intertoto Cup runner-up: 1996

Grazer AK

- Austrian Bundesliga: 2003–04
- Austrian Cup: 2003–04
- Austrian SuperCup: 2004

Individual

- Young Professional Footballer of the Year: 1992–93
