= Ebbe Sand =

Danish footballer (born 1972)

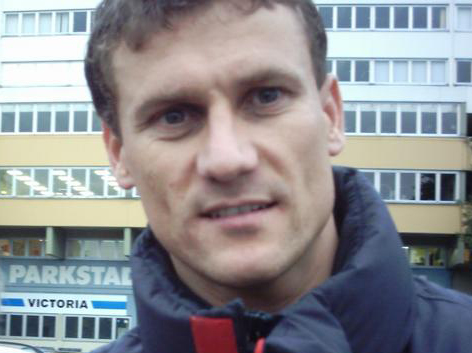
- Sand with Schalke 04 in 1999

Personal information
- Date of birth: 19 July 1972 (age 54)
- Place of birth: Aalborg, Denmark
- Height: 1.83 m (6 ft 0 in)
- Position: Striker

Youth career
- 1977–1991: Hadsund BK

Senior career*
Years	Team	Apps	(Gls)
1991–1992	Hadsund BK	17	(7)
1992–1999	Brøndby IF	135	(69)
1999–2006	Schalke 04	214	(73)
Total		366	(149)

International career
1998–2004	Denmark	66	(22)

Managerial career
- 2020: Denmark (caretaker)
- * Club domestic league appearances and goals

Ebbe Sand (Danish pronunciation: [ˈepə ˈsænˀ]; born 19 July 1972) is a Danish former professional footballer who played as a striker for Brøndby IF in Denmark and FC Schalke 04 in Germany. He was the Bundesliga top scorer in 2001 and won the DFB-Pokal in 2001 and 2002 with Schalke. On the international stage, he played for the Denmark national team at the 1998 and 2002 FIFA World Cup, as well as the 2000 and 2004 European Championships. At the 1998 World Cup, he scored the fastest-ever World Cup goal by a substitute – 16 seconds after entering the match.

== Biography ==
Born in Aalborg and raised in Hadsund, Sand started playing for hometown club Hadsund BK alongside his twin brother Peter Sand. Moving to Copenhagen in order to study building engineering at the Technical University of Denmark, he and his brother Peter decided to try their luck at Brøndby IF. After three years of playing only a few games as attacking midfielder, Sand got a chance to play regularly in 1995 and he soon made a name for himself. His brother would never play for Brøndby, but played professionally for a number of other clubs.

=== National breakthrough ===
Sand scored 12 goals in 29 games in his breakthrough season and helped Brøndby win the Danish Superliga title. Brøndby matched that feat in both 1997 and 1998, with 1998 being an even better year for both Sand and Brøndby. Sand won the Danish Golden Boot as he scored 28 goals in 33 games and helped Brøndby win the Danish Cup, completing the Double. Sand was first capped for the Denmark national football team on 22 April 1998 against Norway, and following his great 1998 season, he was selected to play for Denmark in the 1998 FIFA World Cup.

He took part in all five Denmark matches at the World Cup, and scored his first goal for Denmark in the game against Nigeria, his own most treasured goal for the national team. Entering as a substitute, he ran into the blind spot of the defense, had the ball lobbed to him over the heads of the defenders by Michael Laudrup, before he headed the ball to his right, past the Nigerian Taribo West, and slotted the ball home in the lower left corner. It only took 16 seconds from his substitution to his goal, a World Cup record that still stands. Following his break through on the international stage, he was named Danish Player of the Year. In 1998, Sand was diagnosed with testicular cancer. He had the cancer removed and was back in action just a few weeks after the operation.

=== Club career abroad ===
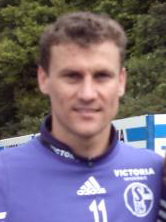
Sand with Schalke

Following the 1998 World Cup, Sand played one more season for Brøndby, in which he scored another 19 goals. He was then transferred to German club Schalke for 10 million DEM in 1999, at that time the most expensive sale by a Danish club. Sand's first season in Germany was successful, as he scored 14 goals, although Schalke only finished 13th in the Bundesliga that year. After scoring four goals in the qualification matches, he played twice for Denmark at the Euro 2000 tournament, before he was benched in the last game of a lacklustre Danish performance.

The 2000–01 season was much more successful for Sand. Schalke finished second in the Bundesliga, after a goal from Bayern Munich four minutes into the added time, ruining Schalke's championship dreams. Despite this they qualified for the UEFA Champions League. They also won the DFB-Pokal. Sand scored 22 goals and tied with Sergej Barbarez for the title of lead topscorer in Germany, and he once again won the Danish Player of the Year award in 2001. Schalke won the DFB-Pokal again in 2002 and finished fifth in the league, with Sand tallying 11 goals. For the national team, he scored an impressive nine goals in ten qualification games for the 2002 FIFA World Cup, but he failed to impress at the final tournament, and was benched the last group match, although he did play three times.

His following years at Schalke would be less successful, as he only scored six and eight goals in the next two seasons, respectively. For Denmark's run in the Euro 2004, Sand missed Denmark's final game due to injury, and he decided to retire from international football. He cited a desire to focus his last active years on playing for Schalke, though he would be ready to re-enter the Denmark team if it qualified for 2006 FIFA World Cup tournament if his form would allow it, though that never became relevant for either party. Initially in his last year of contract, he prolonged his stay at Schalke by a year, despite only scoring eight goals in 2005. In July 2005, he announced the coming season as his last for Schalke and following seven years in Germany he would move to Denmark in order to work at Danish Superliga club Silkeborg IF. He thereby turned down an offer from Schalke manager Rudi Assauer to become his managerial protégé at Schalke. For his last season at Schalke he was chosen as team captain, even though stiff competition by fellow Dane Søren Larsen and German striker Kevin Kurányi relegated Sand's role to substitute player. He ended his Schalke career at the Bundesliga game with VfB Stuttgart on 13 May 2006, scoring a goal in the 3–2 Schalke victory before being substituted to a standing ovation by the spectators.

=== Management career ===
After retiring, Sand joined Silkeborg IF in several roles before joining the Denmark National Team as a forwards coach. He then joined Schalke 04 in an advisory role before he was confirmed as the Director of Football of Brøndby IF on 31 October 2018, a job which he took over on 1 January 2019. Shortly after becoming the Director of Football at Brøndby IF, he sacked head coach Alexander Zorniger following a string of bad results. On 10 July 2019, Brøndby IF announced, that they had hired Carsten V. Jensen as their new director of football and offered Sand a new position, which he had refused and therefore left the club.

Sand briefly managed the Denmark national team on 11 November 2020, as Kasper Hjulmand was sidelined with COVID-19. In his only match in charge, Sand led Denmark to a 2–0 victory over Sweden.

== Career statistics ==
=== Club ===
Appearances and goals by club, season and competition
Club	Season	League			Cup		League Cup		Europe		Other (Note: Appearances in Danish Supercup and UI Cup)		Total	
Club	Season	Division	Apps	Goals	Apps	Goals	Apps	Goals	Apps	Goals	Apps	Goals	Apps	Goals
Brøndby IF	1992–93	Superliga	1	0	0	0	—		0	0	—		1	0
Brøndby IF	1993–94	Superliga	4	1	1	0	—		1	0	—		6	1
Brøndby IF	1994–95	Superliga	8	2	0	0	—		0	0	—		8	2
Brøndby IF	1995–96	Superliga	29	12	5	0	3	3	8	1	—		45	16
Brøndby IF	1996–97	Superliga	29	7	3	1	—		10	2	1	1	43	11
Brøndby IF	1997–98	Superliga	33	28	5	2	—		3	1	1	0	42	31
Brøndby IF	1998–99	Superliga	31	19	4	4	—		8	1	—		43	24
Brøndby IF	Total		135	69	18	7	3	3	30	5	2	1	188	85
Schalke 04	1999–2000	Bundesliga	32	14	2	2	—		—		—		34	16
Schalke 04	2000–01	Bundesliga	33	22	6	4	—		—		—		39	26
Schalke 04	2001–02	Bundesliga	28	11	6	4	2	0	3	1	—		39	16
Schalke 04	2002–03	Bundesliga	33	6	3	4	2	0	5	3	—		43	13
Schalke 04	2003–04	Bundesliga	30	8	2	1	—		2	0	4	1	38	10
Schalke 04	2004–05	Bundesliga	28	8	5	3	—		8	4	2	1	43	16
Schalke 04	2005–06	Bundesliga	30	4	1	0	2	1	13	2	—		46	7
Schalke 04	Total		214	73	25	18	6	1	31	10	6	2	282	104
Career total			349	142	43	25	9	4	61	15	8	3	470	189

=== International ===
Appearances and goals by national team and year
National team	Year	Apps	Goals
Denmark	1998	10	1
Denmark	1999	11	4
Denmark	2000	10	2
Denmark	2001	10	9
Denmark	2002	11	4
Denmark	2003	7	0
Denmark	2004	7	2
Total		66	22

Scores and results list Denmark's goal tally first, score column indicates score after each Sand goal.

List of international goals scored by Ebbe Sand
No.	Date	Venue	Opponent	Score	Result	Competition
1	28 June 1998	Stade de France, Saint-Denis, France	Nigeria	3–0	4–1	1998 World Cup
2	10 February 1999	Stadion Poljud, Split, Croatia	Croatia	1–0	1–0	Friendly
3	27 March 1999	Parken Stadium, Copenhagen, Denmark	Italy	1–1	1–2	Euro 2000 qualifier
4	28 April 1999	Parken Stadium, Copenhagen, Denmark	South Africa	1–0	1–1	Friendly
5	17 November 1999	Parken Stadium, Copenhagen, Denmark	Israel	1–0	3–0	Euro 2000 play-off qualifier
6	16 August 2000	Tórsvøllur, Tórshavn, Faroes	Faroe Islands	1–0	2–0	2000–01 Nordic Football Championship
7	11 October 2000	Parken Stadium, Copenhagen, Denmark	Bulgaria	1–0	1–1	2002 World Cup qualifier
8	24 March 2001	Ta' Qali National Stadium, Attard, Malta	Malta	1–0	5–0	2002 World Cup qualifier
9	24 March 2001	Ta' Qali National Stadium, Attard, Malta	Malta	3–0	5–0	2002 World Cup qualifier
10	24 March 2001	Ta' Qali National Stadium, Attard, Malta	Malta	5–0	5–0	2002 World Cup qualifier
11	25 April 2001	Parken Stadium, Copenhagen, Denmark	Slovenia	3–0	3–0	Friendly
12	2 June 2001	Parken Stadium, Copenhagen, Denmark	Czech Republic	1–0	2–1	2002 World Cup qualifier
13	6 June 2001	Parken Stadium, Copenhagen, Denmark	Malta	1–1	2–1	2002 World Cup qualifier
14	6 June 2001	Parken Stadium, Copenhagen, Denmark	Malta	2–1	2–1	2002 World Cup qualifier
15	6 October 2001	Parken Stadium, Copenhagen, Denmark	Iceland	2–0	6–0	2002 World Cup qualifier
16	6 October 2001	Parken Stadium, Copenhagen, Denmark	Iceland	5–0	6–0	2002 World Cup qualifier
17	13 February 2002	King Fahd International Stadium, Riyadh, Saudi Arabia	Saudi Arabia	1–0	1–0	Friendly
18	26 May 2002	Kimiidera Park, Wakayama, Japan	Tunisia	2–1	2–1	Friendly
19	21 August 2002	Hampden Park, Glasgow, Scotland	Scotland	1–0	1–0	Friendly
20	12 October 2002	Parken Stadium, Copenhagen, Denmark	Luxembourg	2–0	2–0	Euro 2004 qualifier
21	28 April 2004	Parken Stadium, Copenhagen, Denmark	Scotland	1–0	1–0	Friendly
22	5 June 2004	Parken Stadium, Copenhagen, Denmark	Croatia	1–2	1–2	Friendly

== Honours ==
Brøndby IF

- Danish Superliga: 1995–96, 1996–97, 1997–98
- Danish Cup: 1997–98

Schalke 04

- DFB-Pokal: 2000–01, 2001–02
- UEFA Intertoto Cup: 2003
- DFL-Ligapokal: 2005

Individual

- Danish Superliga top scorer: 1997–98 (28 goals)
- Danish Footballer of the Year: 1998, 2001
- Bundesliga top scorer: 2000–01 (22 goals, shared with Sergej Barbarez)

Sporting positions
Preceded by Frank Rost	Schalke 04 captain 2005–2006	Succeeded by Marcelo Bordon
