= Émile Mpenza =

Belgian footballer (born 1978)

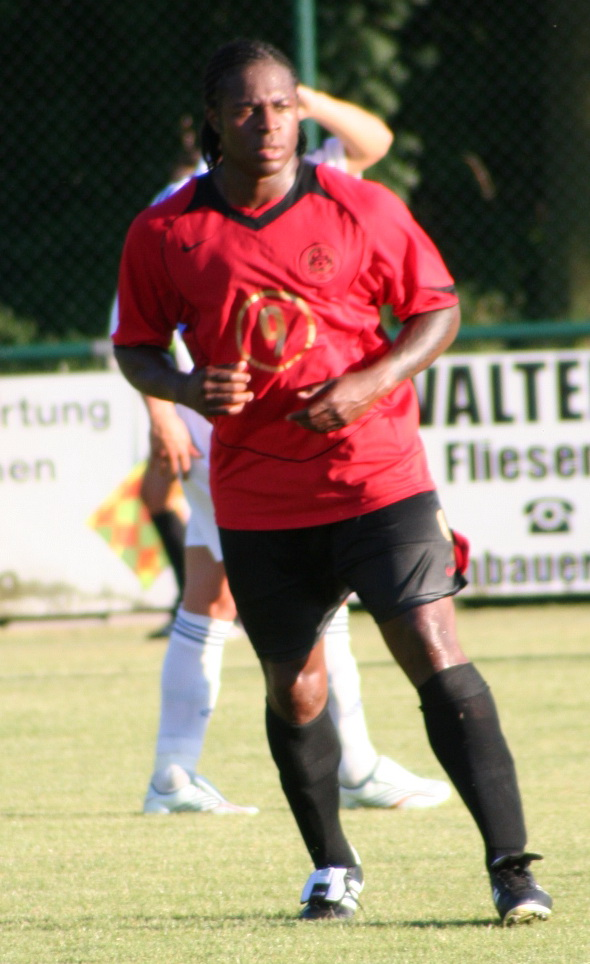
- Mpenza in 2010

Personal information
- Full name: Eka Basunga Lokonda Mpenza
- Date of birth: 4 July 1978 (age 48)
- Place of birth: Zellik, Belgium
- Height: 1.77 m (5 ft 10 in)
- Position: Striker

Youth career
- 1986–1989: LC Mesvins
- 1989–1995: Kortrijk

Senior career*
Years	Team	Apps	(Gls)
1995–1996	Kortrijk	32	(5)
1996–1997	Mouscron	31	(12)
1997–1999	Standard Liège	46	(20)
2000–2003	Schalke 04	79	(28)
2003–2004	Standard Liège	28	(21)
2004–2006	Hamburger SV	36	(5)
2006–2007	Al-Rayyan	19	(9)
2007–2008	Manchester City	25	(5)
2008–2009	Plymouth Argyle	9	(2)
2009–2010	Sion	31	(21)
2010–2012	Neftchi Baku	31	(6)
2013–2014	Eendracht Aalst	0	(0)
Total		367	(134)

International career
1995–1996	Belgium U18	7	(6)
1995	Belgium U19	7	(0)
1996	Belgium U21	3	(0)
1997–2009	Belgium	57	(19)
- * Club domestic league appearances and goals

Eka Basunga Lokonda "Émile" Mpenza (born 4 July 1978) is a Belgian former footballer who played as a striker. He has been capped at international level by Belgium. His older brother, Mbo, also represented Belgium.

== Club career ==
=== Belgium, Germany and Qatar ===
Mpenza started his career at K.V. Kortrijk, and then moved to R.E. Mouscron and Standard Liège in quick succession, with older brother Mbo playing alongside in all three clubs. In 2000, he moved to Bundesliga side FC Schalke 04, in an exchange with Michaël Goossens. At Schalke he was very successful together with his compatriot Marc Wilmots and other striker Ebbe Sand but they failed to win the German title on the last day of competition. Mpenza returned to Standard three years later. In 2004–05 he returned to Germany, signing for Hamburger SV. However, in January 2006 he made a surprise move to Qatari team Al Rayyan.

=== Manchester City ===
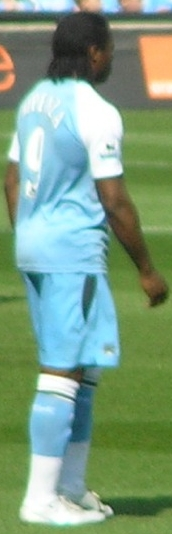
Mpenza with Manchester City in 2007

Mpenza signed for Manchester City, after playing and scoring in a specially arranged match at Eastlands on 14 February 2007. "I am not finished and I will prove it in Manchester", Mpenza told Belgian radio station Bel RTL. "I make this move as revenge, with respect to all those who criticised my decision to play in Qatar". He made his debut against Wigan Athletic on 3 March 2007 as a half-time substitute replacing Georgios Samaras. He scored his first goal for the club in the 2–0 win at Middlesbrough on 17 March 2007, and his second in the 1–0 victory at Newcastle United on 30 March. He scored once more in the 2006–07 season, away to Tottenham Hotspur on the last day of the season, as City lost 2–1.

Having signed until the end of the 2007–08 season, Mpenza scored on City's first pre-season game of the 2007–08 season away to Doncaster Rovers. He would also equalise against Fulham and put City ahead against Bristol City and Newcastle United. However, facing competition for his place from Rolando Bianchi, Valeri Bojinov, Geovanni and Elano, all signed by new City manager Sven-Göran Eriksson in summer 2007, Mpenza did not score again after September, and was released in July 2008.

=== Plymouth Argyle ===
He then signed for Championship side Plymouth Argyle on 2 September 2008. Mpenza went on to make his Argyle debut as a sub on 70 minutes in a 2–1 defeat to Norwich City on 13 September. He then scored his first goal for the club against Charlton Athletic in a 2–2 draw, and scored again in a 2–1 win over Cardiff City. However Mpenza's time at Plymouth Argyle was blighted by injury and therefore he was not offered a new contract.

=== Sion ===
For the 2009–10 season, Mpenza signed a one-year contract with Swiss Topflight club FC Sion. Here he rediscovered his eye for goal by scoring 21 goals in 32 matches.

=== Neftchi Baku ===
In August 2010, Mpenza signed a three-year contract with Azerbaijan Premier League club Neftchi Baku. He left the club in January 2012, having lost his place in the team during the 2011–12 season.

In June 2015, Neftchi Baku were ordered by FIFA to pay Mpenza €1 million in unpaid wages.

=== Eendracht Aalst ===
After searching a club for over a year, Mpenza finally signed a one-year contract with Eendracht Aalst on 1 October 2013.

== International career ==
Mpenza played for the Belgium national football team between 1997 and 2009, though he was frequently injured in times of international call-ups. He played alongside his brother Mbo in the 1998 World Cup and in Euro 2000 where he scored a goal in the opening match against Sweden (which ended with Belgium's victory 2–1), but missed out on the World Cup in 2002 with a groin injury.

== Career statistics ==
Appearances and goals by club, season and competition
Club	Season	League			National cup (Note: Includes Belgian Cup, DFB-Pokal, FA Cup, Swiss Cup, Azerbaijan Cup)		Europe		Other		Total	
Club	Season	Division	Apps	Goals	Apps	Goals	Apps	Goals	Apps	Goals	Apps	Goals
Kortrijk	1995–96	Belgian Second Division	31	4	2	0	—		4 (Note: Appearances in Play Off Belgian First Division)	3	35	7
Mouscron	1996–97	Belgian First Division	31	12	1	0	—		—		32	12
Standard Liège	1997–98	Belgian First Division	19	6	1	0	2 (Note: Appearances in UEFA Intertoto Cup)	1	—		22	7
Standard Liège	1998–99	Belgian First Division	17	10	3	1	—		1 (Note: Appearances in Belgian League Cup)	1	21	12
Standard Liège	1999–2000	Belgian First Division	11	4	1	1	0	0	—		12	5
Standard Liège	Total		47	20	5	2	2	1	1	1	55	24
Schalke 04	1999–2000	Bundesliga	15	6	0	0	—		—		15	6
Schalke 04	2000–01	Bundesliga	27	13	5	1	3 (Note: Appearances in UEFA Champions League)	1	—		35	15
Schalke 04	2001–02	Bundesliga	16	4	0	0	—		2 (Note: Appearances in Ligapokal)	0	18	4
Schalke 04	2002–03	Bundesliga	21	5	3	2	—		0	0	24	7
Schalke 04	Total		79	28	8	3	3	1	2	0	92	32
Standard Liège	2003–04	Belgian First Division	28	21	1	0	—		—		29	21
Hamburg	2004–05	Bundesliga	26	4	1	1	4	1	—		31	6
Hamburg	2005–06	Bundesliga	10	1	0	0	7	1	—		17	2
Hamburg	Total		36	5	1	1	11	2	—		48	8
Al-Rayyan	2005–06	Qatar Stars League	11	6	0	0	—		—		11	6
Al-Rayyan	2006–07	Qatar Stars League	8	3	0	0	—		—		18	3
Al-Rayyan	Total		19	9	0	0	—		0	0	19	9
Manchester City	2006–07	Premier League	10	3	1	0	—		—		11	3
Manchester City	2007–08	Premier League	15	2	1	0	—		2 (Note: Appearances in EFL Cup)	1	18	3
Manchester City	Total		25	5	2	0	—		2	1	29	6
Plymouth Argyle	2008–09	First Division	9	2	0	0	—		—		9	2
Sion	2009–10	Swiss Super League	31	21	1	0	—		2 (Note: Appearances in Europa League qualifying round)	0	34	21
Neftchi Baku	2010–11	Azerbaijan Premier League	23	6	0	0	—		5 (Note: Appearances in Premyer Liqasi Meisterschaftsrunde)	1	28	7
Neftchi Baku	2011–12	Azerbaijan Premier League	8	0	0	0	—		2 (Note: Appearances in UEFA Champions League qualifying round)	0	10	0
Neftchi Baku	Total		31	6	0	0	—		7	1	38	7
Eendracht Aalst	2011—12	Belgian Second Division	0	0	0	0	—		—		0	0
Career total			367	133	19	6	16	4	18	6	420	149

Appearances and goals by national team and year
National team	Year	Apps	Goals
Belgium	1997	5	2
Belgium	1998	8	0
Belgium	1999	9	4
Belgium	2000	7	3
Belgium	2001	6	3
Belgium	2002	2	0
Belgium	2003	4	2
Belgium	2004	1	0
Belgium	2005	7	3
Belgium	2006	3	0
Belgium	2007	2	0
Belgium	2008	3	2
Total		57	19

=== International goals ===
Scores and results list Belgium's goal tally first, score column indicates score after each Mpenza goal.

Goal	Date	Venue	Opponent	Score	Result	Competition
1	7 June 1997	Stade Roi Baudouin, Brussels	San Marino	3–0	6–0	1998 World Cup Qualification
2	7 June 1997	Stade Roi Baudouin, Brussels	San Marino	5–0	6–0	1998 World Cup Qualification
3	3 February 1999	Tsirion Stadium, Limassol	Cyprus	1–0	1–0	Friendly
4	18 August 1999	Jan Breydel Stadium, Bruges	Finland	3–4	3–4	Friendly
5	4 September 1999	Feijenoord Stadion, Rotterdam	Netherlands	5–5	5–5	Friendly
6	7 September 1999	Stade Maurice Dufrasne, Liège	Morocco	3–0	4–0	Friendly
7	29 March 2000	Stade Roi Baudouin, Brussels	Netherlands	2–0	2–2	Friendly
8	10 June 2000	Stade Roi Baudouin, Brussels	Sweden	2–0	2–1	Euro 2000
9	16 August 2000	Georgi Asparuhov Stadium, Sofia	Bulgaria	2–0	3–1	Friendly
10	28 February 2001	Stade Roi Baudouin, Brussels	San Marino	2–0	10–1	2002 World Cup Qualification
11	25 April 2001	Letná Stadium, Prague	Czech Republic	1–0	1–1	Friendly
12	2 June 2001	Stade Roi Baudouin, Brussels	Latvia	3–1	3–1	2002 World Cup Qualification
13	12 February 2003	Stade 19 Mai 1956, Annaba	Algeria	1–0	3–1	Friendly
14	12 February 2003	Stade 19 Mai 1956, Annaba	Algeria	3–0	3–1	Friendly
15	26 March 2005	Stade Roi Baudouin, Brussels	Bosnia and Herzegovina	1–1	4–1	2006 World Cup Qualification
16	26 March 2005	Stade Roi Baudouin, Brussels	Bosnia and Herzegovina	3–1	4–1	2006 World Cup Qualification
17	17 August 2005	Stade Roi Baudouin, Brussels	Greece	1–0	2–0	Friendly
18	10 October 2009	Stade Roi Baudouin, Brussels	Turkey	1–0	2–0	2010 World Cup Qualification
19	10 October 2009	Stade Roi Baudouin, Brussels	Turkey	2–0	2–0	2010 World Cup Qualification

== Honours ==
=== Club ===
Schalke 04

- DFB-Pokal: 2000–01, 2001–02

Hamburger SV

- UEFA Intertoto Cup: 2005

Neftchi Baku

- Azerbaijan Premier League: 2010–11

=== Individual ===
- Belgian Young Professional Footballer of the Year: 1996–97
- Belgian Ebony Shoe: 1997
- Best Belgian Footballer Abroad: 2000
- kicker German Football Rankings - International Class Player: 2000-01
- Standard Liège Man of the Season: 2003–04
