= Yves Eigenrauch =

German former professional footballer

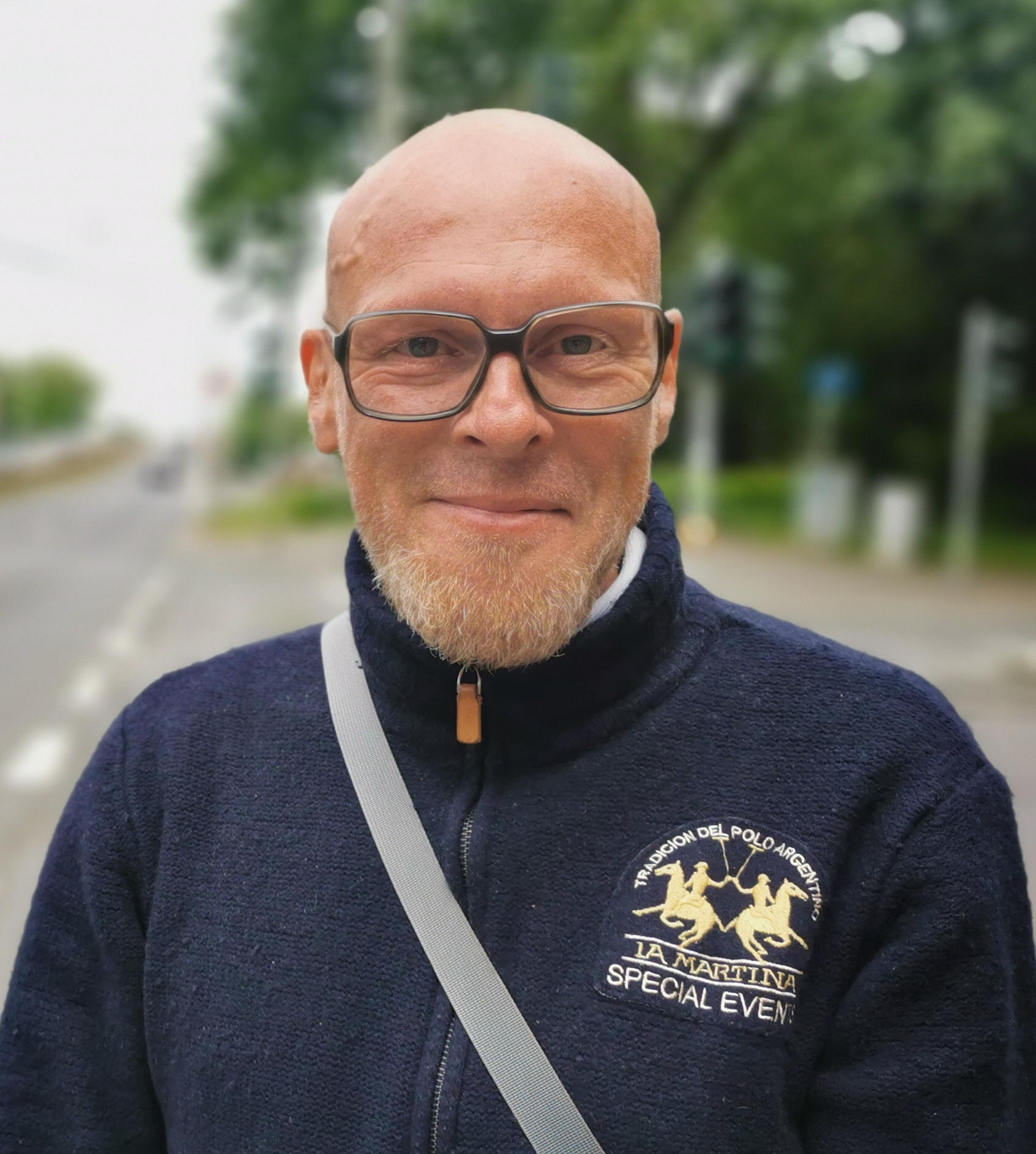

Personal information
- Date of birth: 24 April 1971 (age 55)
- Place of birth: Minden, West Germany
- Height: 1.79 m (5 ft 10 in)
- Position: Defender

Youth career
- Minden 05
- Blau-Weiß Lerbeck
- 1985–1988: Arminia Bielefeld

Senior career*
Years	Team	Apps	(Gls)
1988–1990	Arminia Bielefeld	34	(1)
1990–2002	Schalke 04	236	(4)
Total		260	(5)
- * Club domestic league appearances and goals

Yves Eigenrauch (born 24 April 1971) is a German former professional footballer who played mainly as a right back.

== Football career ==
Eigenrauch was born in Minden, North Rhine-Westphalia. After beginning his career with Arminia Bielefeld, he went on to spend 12 years with FC Schalke 04, being regularly used during nine of his first ten. He contributed with eight matches in the club's victorious run in the UEFA Cup in 1996–97.

After two injured-ravaged seasons from 2000 to 2002 (no Bundesliga appearances in the latter), Eigenrauch retired from the game at the age of 31.

== Honours ==
Schalke 04

- DFB-Pokal: 2000–01
- UEFA Cup: 1996–97
