= Ünal Alpuğan =

Turkish-German footballer

Personal information
- Date of birth: 3 August 1973 (age 53)
- Place of birth: Gelsenkirchen, West Germany
- Height: 1.81 m (5 ft 11 in)
- Position: Midfielder

Youth career
- 1981–1984: Westfalia Buer
- 1984–1988: Schalke 04
- 1988–1992: SG Wattenscheid 09

Senior career*
Years	Team	Apps	(Gls)
1992–1995	SG Wattenscheid 09 II		
1995–1997	FC Rhade		
1997–2001	Schalke 04	42	(1)
2001–2006	Çaykur Rizespor	141	(10)
2006–2008	İstanbul Büyükşehir Belediyespor	36	(0)
- * Club domestic league appearances and goals

Ünal Alpuğan (born 3 August 1973) is a Turkish-German former professional footballer who played as a midfielder.

== Honours ==
- DFB-Pokal: 2000–01
