= Oliver Held =

German footballer

Personal information
- Date of birth: 10 September 1972 (age 54)
- Place of birth: Kiel, West Germany
- Height: 1.79 m (5 ft 10 in)
- Position: Midfielder

Youth career
- VfB Kiel
- SV Friedrichsort

Senior career*
Years	Team	Apps	(Gls)
–1995	Holstein Kiel		
1995–2001	Schalke 04	96	(4)
2001–2003	FC St. Pauli	37	(2)
2003–2010	TSV Kropp		
- * Club domestic league appearances and goals

Oliver Held (born 10 September 1972) is a German former professional footballer who played as a midfielder.

== Honours ==
- UEFA Cup: 1996–97
- DFB-Pokal: 2000–01
- Bundesliga runner-up: 2000–01
