= Kristijan Đorđević =

Serbian footballer

Personal information
- Date of birth: 6 January 1976 (age 50)
- Place of birth: Spaichingen, West Germany
- Height: 1.84 m (6 ft 0 in)
- Position: Midfielder

Youth career
- Spaichingen
- Tuttlingen

Senior career*
Years	Team	Apps	(Gls)
1994–1996	SSV Reutlingen	39	(5)
1996–2001	VfB Stuttgart	66	(5)
2001–2004	Schalke 04	10	(0)
2002–2003	Schalke 04 II	3	(0)
Total		118	(10)

International career
1998	FR Yugoslavia	1	(0)

Managerial career
- 2005-2008: FC 08 Villingen
- 2011-2012: SC Pfullendorf
- 2016-2017: Sankt Gallen (asst.)
- 2019-2021: Schaffhausen (asst.)
- 2023: FC Tägerwilen
- 2024–: Grasshopper U19
- * Club domestic league appearances and goals

Kristijan Đorđević (Serbian Cyrillic: Кристијан Ђорђевић; also transliterated Kristijan Djordjević; born 6 January 1976) is a Serbian retired footballer. He is the current coach of Grasshopper Club Zürich's U19 squad.

Born in Spaichingen, West Germany, he made one appearance for FR Yugoslavia against Switzerland in a friendly on 2 September 1998.
