= Youri Mulder =

Dutch footballer (born 1969)

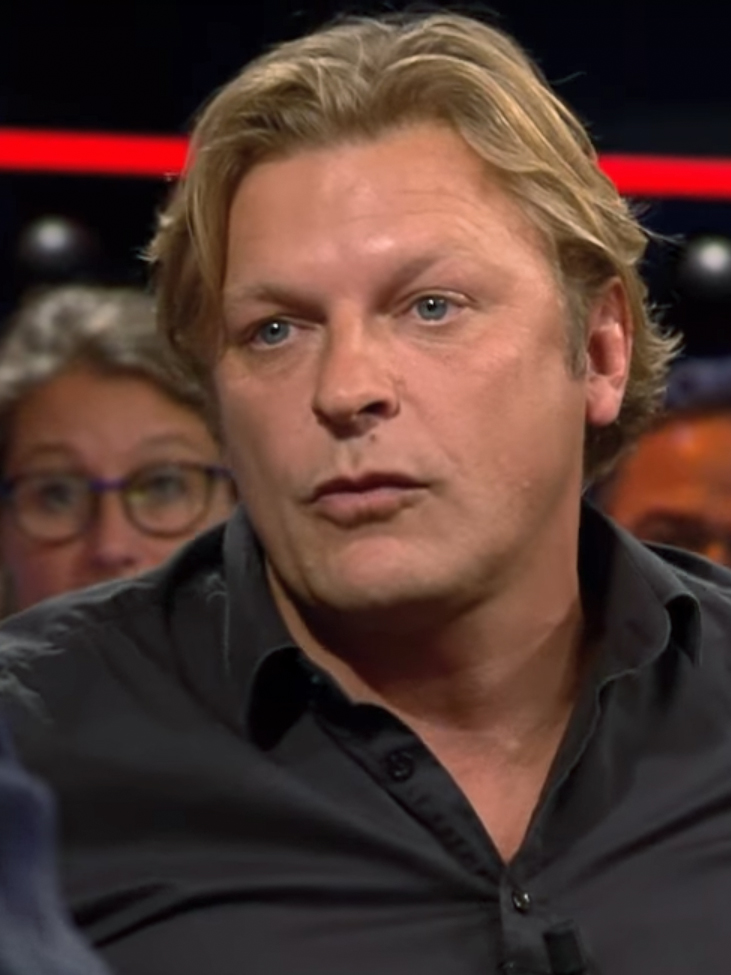
- Mulder in 2017

Personal information
- Date of birth: 23 March 1969 (age 57)
- Place of birth: Brussels, Belgium
- Height: 1.90 m (6 ft 3 in)
- Position: Striker

Youth career
- SDO Bussum
- Ajax

Senior career*
Years	Team	Apps	(Gls)
1988–1990	ZVV Adelaars		
1990–1993	Twente	72	(27)
1993–2002	Schalke 04	176	(33)

International career
1994–2001	Netherlands	9	(3)

Managerial career
- 2008: Schalke 04 (joint interim)
- 2008–2009: Schalke 04 (assistant)
- 2009: Schalke 04 (joint interim)
- * Club domestic league appearances and goals

Youri Mulder (Dutch pronunciation: [ˈjuːri ˈmʏldər]; born 23 March 1969) is a football manager and former player who played as a striker. Born in Belgium, he played for the Netherlands national team.

== Club career ==
Mulder was born in Brussels, Belgium. The son of former Ajax Amsterdam and R.S.C. Anderlecht player Jan Mulder, he played youth football for SDO Bussum and Ajax. After two years in amateur football, he made his professional debuts at 21, with FC Twente. In his second season, he scored a career-best 18 goals, as the club finished sixth in the Eredivisie.

In 1993, Mulder moved to the German Bundesliga with FC Schalke 04, where he would play for nearly one decade. He made his league debut on 7 August, in a 0–3 loss at SG Wattenscheid 09. His first three years at the Gelsenkirchen side were successful individually – 22 goals combined – and the 1996–97 season brought with it the UEFA Cup conquest, with the player netting three times in the campaign, including once in the quarter-finals against Valencia CF.

Additionally, Mulder also won two consecutive German Cups, in 2001 and 2002. Only managing to appear 33 times (with just one goal) in his last three seasons combined, he retired at the end of 2001–02, aged 33.

In 2007–08, Mulder had his first coaching experience: he started the season as an offensive trainer in Twente, then rejoined another former side, Schalke 04, in April 2008, working with former teammate Michael Büskens as replacements for dismissed Mirko Slomka, a situation which occurred again in 2009, after the sacking of Fred Rutten, being joined then by another former club player, Oliver Reck.

== International career ==
Mulder played nine matches for the Netherlands national team, and found the net three times. He made his international debut on 16 November 1994, and participated at UEFA Euro 1996, where he played the last ten minutes (plus extra time) in the quarterfinal loss against France.

== Personal life ==
Youri Mulder is the son of Dutch footballer Jan Mulder who played for Anderlecht and Ajax. He also worked as a sports commentator for NOS.

== Career statistics ==
=== International ===
Appearances and goals by national team and year
National team	Year	Apps	Goals
Netherlands	1994	2	1
Netherlands	1995	3	2
Netherlands	1996	3	0
Netherlands	1999	1	0
Total		9	3

Scores and results list Netherlands' goal tally first, score column indicates score after each Mulder goal.

List of international goals scored by Youri Mulder
No.	Date	Venue	Opponent	Score	Result	Competition	Ref.
1	14 December 1994	De Kuip, Rotterdam, Netherlands	Luxembourg	1–0	5–0	UEFA Euro 1996 qualifying	
2	6 September 1995	De Kuip, Rotterdam, Netherlands	Belarus	1–0	1–0	UEFA Euro 1996 qualifying	
3	15 November 1995	De Kuip, Rotterdam, Netherlands	Norway	2–0	3–0	UEFA Euro 1996 qualifying	

== Honours ==
Schalke

- DFB-Pokal: 2000–01, 2001–02
- UEFA Cup: 1996–97

== Books ==
- Ingo Schiweck, Kicken beim Feind? Der ganz alltägliche Friede hinter dem deutsch-niederländischen Fußballkrieg, Düsseldorf 2006 (in German) ISBN 3-9810957-4-X
