= Radoslav Látal =

Czech football coach and former player (born 1970)

Personal information
- Date of birth: 6 January 1970 (age 56)
- Place of birth: Prostějov, Czechoslovakia
- Height: 1.79 m (5 ft 10 in)
- Position: Midfielder

Youth career
- 1977–1987: Sigma Olomouc

Senior career*
Years	Team	Apps	(Gls)
1987–1989	Sigma Olomouc	35	(1)
1989–1990	Dukla Prague	41	(2)
1991–1994	Sigma Olomouc	87	(10)
1994–2001	Schalke 04	187	(14)
2001	Sigma Olomouc	15	(1)
2002–2005	Baník Ostrava	86	(5)

International career
1991–1993	Czechoslovakia	11	(2)
1994–2001	Czech Republic	47	(1)

Managerial career
- 2007–2008: Frýdek-Místek
- 2008–2009: Opava
- 2010–2012: Baník Sokolov
- 2012: Baník Ostrava
- 2013–2014: MFK Košice
- 2015–2016: Piast Gliwice
- 2016–2017: Piast Gliwice
- 2018: Dynamo Brest
- 2018: Spartak Trnava
- 2019–2021: Sigma Olomouc
- 2022–2023: Bruk-Bet Termalica
- 2023–2024: Jablonec
Medal record
Men's football
Representing Czech Republic
UEFA European Championship
Runner-up	1996 England
- * Club domestic league appearances and goals

Radoslav Látal (born 6 January 1970) is a Czech football manager and former player who played as a midfielder.

== Playing career ==
Látal played for the Czech Republic, for which he appeared in 47 matches and participated at the Euro 1996 and Euro 2000. On 11 June 2000, he was dismissed by referee Pierluigi Collina in the closing moments of the Czechs' Euro 2000 match against the Netherlands. Látal, who had already been substituted in that match, was punished for what were perceived to be inappropriate words, following Collina's decision to award the Dutch a last-minute penalty, which Frank de Boer converted for the only goal of the game. He also played for Czechoslovakia at the 1989 FIFA World Youth Championship in Saudi Arabia.

== Managerial career ==
Látal became manager of SFC Opava in 2008 and went on to Sokolov in September 2010. In March 2012, he signed a contract at Baník Ostrava lasting until summer 2013, replacing Pavel Malura.

On 10 January 2022, it was confirmed that Látal would take over from Michał Probierz at the Bruk-Bet Termalica Sports Stadium. Látal's first competitive game in charge of Bruk-Bet Termalica ended in a 2–1 home victory against Jagiellonia Białystok on 4 February 2022. On 16 June 2023, five days after losing the promotion play-offs final to Puszcza Niepołomice at home, it was announced Látal would leave the club at the end of the month. On 30 June 2023, Látal signed with Jablonec.

== Honours ==
=== Club ===
Schalke 04

- UEFA Cup: 1996–97

Baník Ostrava

- Czech First League: 2003–04
- Czech Cup: 2004–05

Dukla Prague

- Czechoslovak Cup: 1989–90

=== International ===
Czech Republic

- UEFA European Football Championship runners-up: 1996

=== Individual ===
- UEFA European Championship Team of the Tournament: 1996
- Czech First League Best XI of the season: 2003–04
- 10th best Czech footballer of the decade (1993–2003) by the fans poll
- In 2010 he was chosen as a member of All stars team SK Sigma Olomouc of all time by the club fans.

=== Manager ===
MFK Košice

- Slovak Cup: 2014

Piast Gliwice

- Ekstraklasa runners-up: 2015–16

Dynamo Brest

- Belarusian Supercup: 2018

Individual

- Ekstraklasa Coach of the Season: 2015–16
- Piłka Nożna Foreigner of the Year: 2015
