= Tomasz Hajto =

Polish footballer (born 1972)

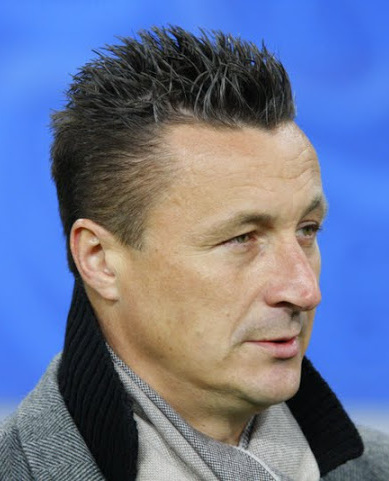
- Hajto in 2012

Personal information
- Full name: Tomasz Hajto
- Date of birth: 16 October 1972 (age 54)
- Place of birth: Maków Podhalański, Poland
- Height: 1.91 m (6 ft 3 in)
- Position: Defender

Youth career
- Halniak Maków Podhalański
- Góral Żywiec

Senior career*
| Years | Team | Apps | (Gls) |
| 1990–1993 | Hutnik Kraków | 33 | (2) |
| 1993–1997 | Górnik Zabrze | 105 | (8) |
| 1997–2000 | MSV Duisburg | 80 | (8) |
| 2000–2004 | Schalke 04 | 104 | (6) |
| 2004–2005 | 1. FC Nürnberg | 17 | (0) |
| 2005–2006 | Southampton | 20 | (0) |
| 2006 | Derby County | 5 | (0) |
| 2006–2007 | ŁKS Łódź | 27 | (1) |
| 2007–2008 | Górnik Zabrze | 15 | (1) |
| 2009–2010 | ŁKS Łódź | 33 | (2) |
| 2011 | LUKS Gomunice | | |
| Total | | 439 | (28) |

International career
| 1996–2005 | Poland | 62 | (6) |

Managerial career
- 2011: LUKS Gomunice (player-manager)
- 2012–2013: Jagiellonia Białystok
- 2014–2015: GKS Tychy
- * Club domestic league appearances and goals

Tomasz Nikodem Hajto (Polish pronunciation: [ˈtɔmaʂ ˈxajtɔ]; born 16 October 1972) is a Polish football pundit, agent, former player and manager.

== Club career ==
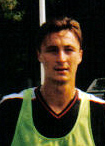
Hajto in 2007

Born in Maków Podhalański, Hajto began his career playing for local club Halniak Maków Podhalański. He moved to Góral Żywiec before making his big break in 1991 with Hutnik Kraków. His prowess as a youngster was noticed by many, and in 1993–94 he was transferred to Górnik Zabrze.

Hajto was soon to create interest from other countries, most particularly Germany and England, but it was to the former that he was first transferred. He first played for MSV Duisburg for two seasons. After the team was relegated to 2. Bundesliga, Hajto was transferred to FC Schalke 04, where he played until 2004. He then signed a two-year contract with 1. FC Nürnberg. As he had not met the expectations, he was transferred to Southampton in summer 2005. In January 2006, his contract with Southampton was cancelled, enabling him to sign for Derby County on an eighteen-month contract, however this deal was also terminated early, after only four months at the club.

== International career ==
Hajto made his debut for the Poland national team on 27 August 1996 in a friendly match against Cyprus. He remained with the national team until 2005, making a total of 62 appearances and scoring six goals.

He played as a defender for Poland in major international tournament qualifiers, including the 1998 FIFA World Cup qualification. In 1998, he scored twice in a friendly against the Russia. He subsequently scored in a UEFA Euro 2000 qualifying match against Bulgaria, and also scored in a friendly against the Spain that same year.

Hajto was a member of the Poland national team at the 2002 FIFA World Cup. He appeared in two group-stage matches, against South Korea and Portugal, and played the full 90 minutes against Portugal. Poland lost 0–4 to Portugal, and Hajto did not play in the match against the United States.

He scored in a friendly against Switzerland in 2001 and also scored against Romania in a friendly in 2002. The latter was the final goal of his six international goals. Hajto made his final international appearance on 9 February 2005 against Belarus, bringing his international career to an end.

== Personal life ==
Hajto is married to a former Polish sprinter Renata Sosin (pl), with whom he has two children: son, Mateusz, and daughter, Wiktoria.

In January 2008, Hajto was found guilty of manslaughter after speeding in his car and killing a female pedestrian at a crossing in Łódź that happened in February 2007. Pleading guilty to the charges, he was given a suspended two-year jail sentence, ordered to pay a fine of 7,000 Polish złotys and given a one-year driving ban. He had earlier been fined in 2004 for dealing in smuggled cigarettes.

== Career statistics ==
=== International ===
Appearances and goals by national team and year
| National team | Year | Apps | Goals |
|---|---|---|---|
| Poland | 1996 | 4 | 0 |
| Poland | 1997 | 6 | 0 |
| Poland | 1998 | 7 | 2 |
| Poland | 1999 | 10 | 2 |
| Poland | 2000 | 4 | 0 |
| Poland | 2001 | 10 | 1 |
| Poland | 2002 | 6 | 1 |
| Poland | 2003 | 8 | 0 |
| Poland | 2004 | 6 | 0 |
| Poland | 2005 | 1 | 0 |
| Total | | 62 | 6 |

Scores and results list Poland's goal tally first, score column indicates score after each Hajto goal.

List of international goals scored by Tomasz Hajto
| No. | Date | Venue | Opponent | Score | Result | Competition |
|---|---|---|---|---|---|---|
| 1 | 27 May 1998 | Silesian Stadium, Chorzów, Poland | Russia | 2–1 | 3–1 | Friendly |
| 2 | 27 May 1998 | Silesian Stadium, Chorzów, Poland | Russia | 3–1 | 3–1 | Friendly |
| 3 | 4 June 1999 | Polish Army Stadium, Warsaw, Poland | Bulgaria | 1–0 | 2–0 | UEFA Euro 2000 qualifying |
| 4 | 18 August 1999 | Polish Army Stadium, Warsaw, Poland | Spain | 1–0 | 1–2 | Friendly |
| 5 | 28 February 2001 | GSZ Stadium, Larnaca, Cyprus | Switzerland | 3–0 | 4–0 | Friendly |
| 6 | 17 April 2002 | Zdzisław Krzyszkowiak Stadium, Bydgoszcz, Poland | Romania | 1–2 | 1–2 | Friendly |

== Managerial statistics ==
Managerial record by team and tenure
| Team | From | To | Record | | | | | | | |
| Team | From | To | G | W | D | L | GF | GA | GD | Win % |
|---|---|---|---|---|---|---|---|---|---|---|
| Jagiellonia Białystok | 5 January 2012 | 30 June 2013 | 47 | 15 | 15 | 17 | 63 | 76 | −13 | 31.91 |
| GKS Tychy | 3 December 2014 | 26 June 2015 | 15 | 3 | 4 | 8 | 14 | 25 | −11 | 20.00 |
| Total | | | 62 | 18 | 19 | 25 | 77 | 101 | −24 | 29.03 |

== Mixed martial arts record ==
Professional record breakdown
| 1 match | 0 wins | 1 loss |
| By knockout | 0 | 0 |
| By submission | 0 | 1 |

| Res. | Record | Opponent | Method | Event | Date | Round | Time | Location | Notes |
|---|---|---|---|---|---|---|---|---|---|
| Loss | 0–1 | Zbigniew Bartman | Submission (rear-naked choke) | Clout MMA 1 | August 5, 2023 | 2 | 0:34 | Warsaw, Poland | Openweight bout |

== Kickboxing record ==
Professional kickboxing record
0 Wins (0 (T)KOs), 1 Loss, 0 Draw
| Date | Result | Opponent | Event | Location | Method | Round | Time |
| 2023-12-29 | Loss | (Poland) Jakub Wawrzyniak | Clout MMA 3 | Warsaw, Poland | TKO (Punches) | 2 | 1:06 |

== Honours ==
Schalke 04

- UEFA Intertoto Cup: 2003
- DFB-Pokal: 2000–01, 2001–02
