= Johan de Kock =

Dutch footballer

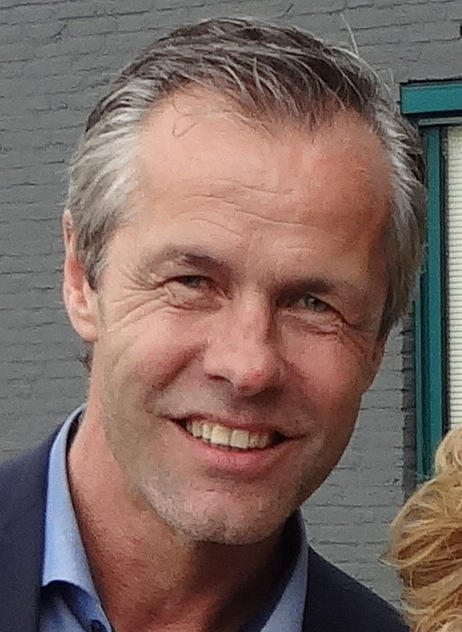
- De Kock in 2015

Personal information
- Date of birth: 25 October 1964 (age 62)
- Place of birth: Sliedrecht, Netherlands
- Height: 1.90 m (6 ft 3 in)
- Position: Centre-back

Youth career
- 1974–1984: VV Sliedrecht

Senior career*
Years	Team	Apps	(Gls)
1984–1987	Groningen	77	(24)
1987–1994	Utrecht	224	(20)
1994–1996	Roda JC	65	(11)
1996–2000	Schalke 04	83	(6)
Total		449	(61)

International career
1993–1997	Netherlands	13	(1)
- * Club domestic league appearances and goals

Johan de Kock (born 25 October 1964) is a Dutch former professional footballer who played as a centre-back. He earned 13 caps for the Netherlands national team, in which he scored one goal. He was a member of the Dutch team at UEFA Euro 1996 in England.

De Kock made his debut for the Netherlands on 24 February 1993 in the 3–1 win at the 1994 FIFA World Cup qualifying match against Turkey in Utrecht. He played for Groningen, Utrecht, Roda JC, and Schalke 04, with whom he won the UEFA Cup in 1997.

Unusually for a top level footballer, De Kock was a part-time player while representing the Netherlands at Euro 1996. He was employed as a road engineer at the time. While playing for Schalke 04, he was involved in designing the Arena AufSchalke.
