= Mike Büskens =

German footballer and manager (born 1968)

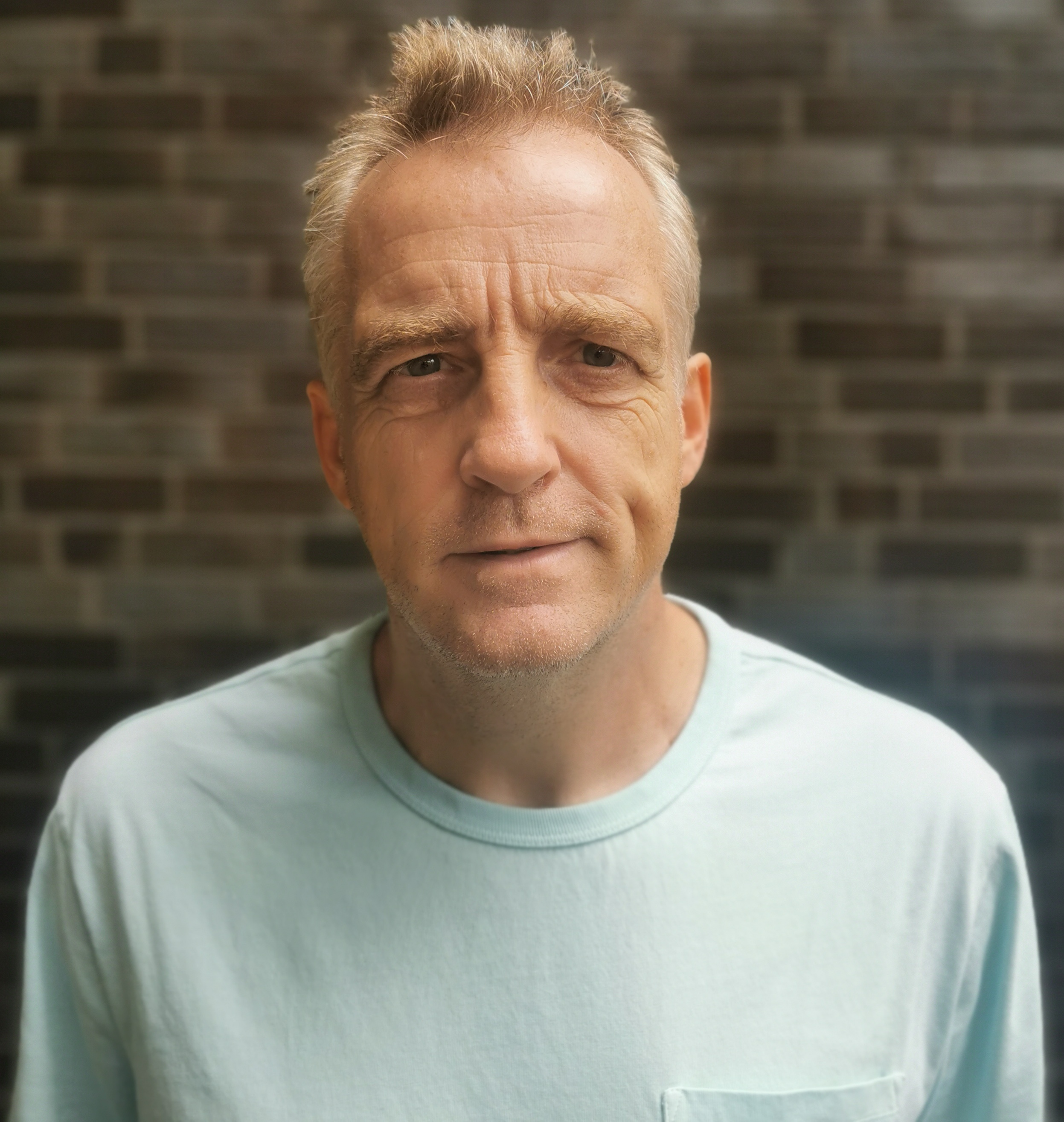
- Büskens in 2026

Personal information
- Full name: Michael Büskens
- Date of birth: 19 March 1968 (age 58)
- Place of birth: Düsseldorf, West Germany
- Height: 1.81 m (5 ft 11 in)
- Position: Midfielder

Youth career
- 1974–1981: Alemannia Düsseldorf
- 1981–1986: Fortuna Düsseldorf
- 1986–1987: VfL Benrath

Senior career*
Years	Team	Apps	(Gls)
1987–1992	Fortuna Düsseldorf	102	(6)
1992–2000	Schalke 04	223	(13)
2000	MSV Duisburg	12	(1)
2000–2003	Schalke 04	34	(0)
2003–2004	Schalke 04 II	17	(5)
Total		388	(25)

Managerial career
- 2005–2008: Schalke 04 II
- 2008: Schalke 04 (joint interim)
- 2009: Schalke 04 (interim)
- 2009–2013: Greuther Fürth
- 2013: Fortuna Düsseldorf
- 2015: Greuther Fürth
- 2016: Rapid Wien
- 2022: Schalke 04 (interim)
- * Club domestic league appearances and goals

Michael Büskens (German: [ˈbʏskəns]; born 19 March 1968) is a German former football player who played as a midfielder and a football manager. He is currently the assistant head coach of Bundesliga club Schalke 04.

During a 14-year professional career, he appeared in nearly 400 Bundesliga games, mainly representing Schalke 04 (11 years) and later also briefly managing the latter.

== Playing career ==
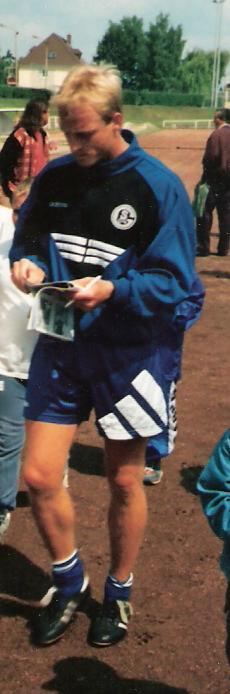
Büskens in Schalke 04 colours in July 1996

Büskens began his career with his hometown team Alemannia Düsseldorf before moving to city giants Fortuna. After five years, he moved to VfL Benrath, returning in 1987 to Fortuna, this time as member of the professional squad, and rarely missed one top-division game during his three-year spell, although ended in relegation.

In 1992, Büskens moved to FC Schalke 04, where he had the most successful years of his career. He was part of the UEFA Cup and German Cup 2001 and 2002 winning squads and never appeared in less than 27 league games in his first seven seasons. In the European conquest of 1997, he played in 10 matches (eight complete), including both legs of the final against Inter Milan.

In January 2000, Büskens spent half a season at MSV Duisburg, returning to Schalke after a poor season. He continued to play for the team until 2003, splitting between the first and second squads in his last year, also being assistant manager of the latter.

== Managerial career ==
=== Schalke 04 ===
In 2005, Büskens succeeded Gerhard Kleppinger as manager of the second squad. On 13 April 2008, he was appointed caretaker manager of Schalke's first team, alongside another former club player, Youri Mulder, succeeding Mirko Slomka after a 1–5 away loss to Werder Bremen, as the team was battling for a UEFA Champions League position (eventually reaching third).

Büskens remained in charge until the end of the season, being replaced by Fred Rutten in July 2008. He finished the stint with a record of five wins and a draw. However, in March 2009, the latter was fired, which led to the pair again taking over the side until the end of the season (now accompanied by another former Schalke player, Oliver Reck), being then replaced by Felix Magath, and released by the club on 23 June 2009. He finished his second stint with a record of four wins, one draw and four losses.

=== Greuther Fürth ===
Büskens was named manager of 2. Bundesliga club Greuther Fürth on 27 December 2009. Under his management, Fürth gained promotion to the Bundesliga for the first time in the club's history in 2012. Büskens was sacked on 20 February 2013. He finished with a record of 50 wins, 33 draws and 33 losses.

=== Fortuna Düsseldorf ===
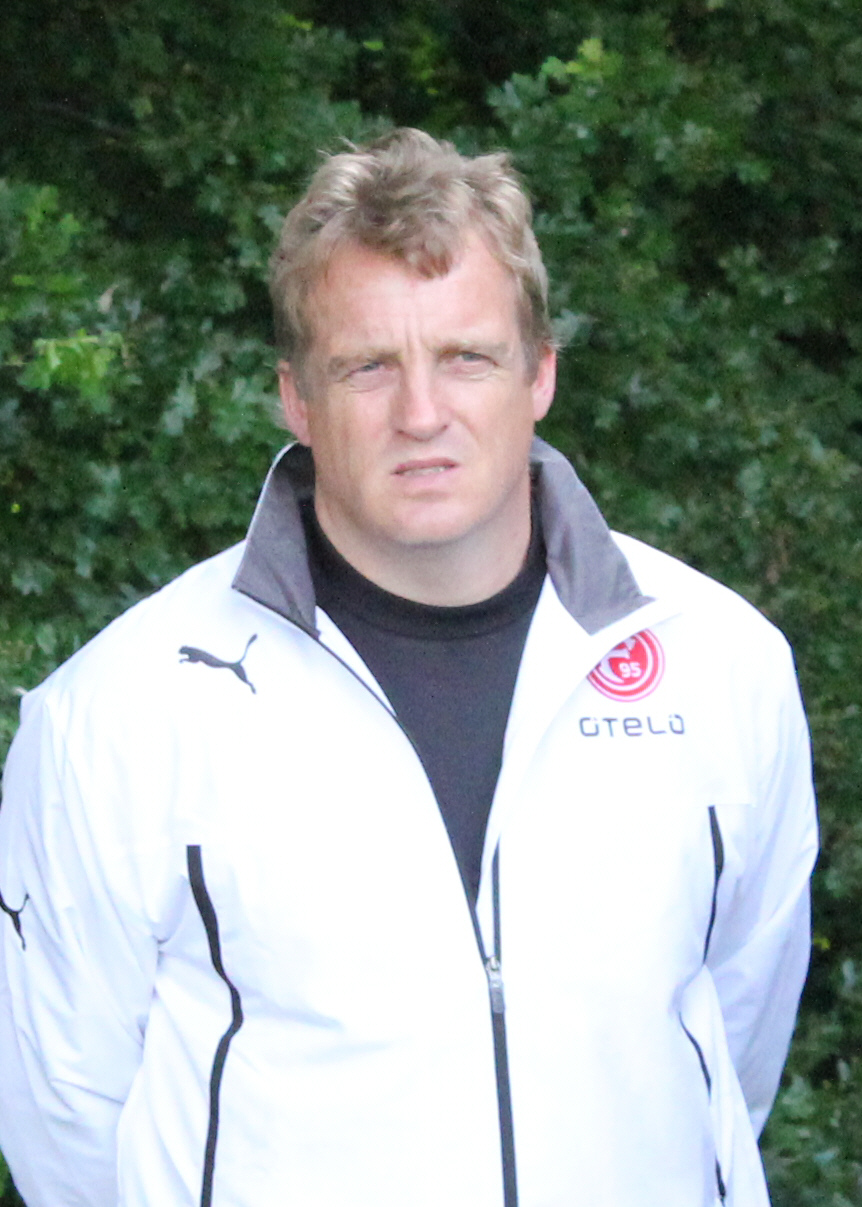
Büskens as Fortuna Düsseldorf manager, 2013

Büskens was named manager of Fortuna Düsseldorf on 4 June 2013. His first match was a 1–0 win against Energie Cottbus. Büskens picked Fabian Giefer to start the match instead of Michael Rensing. Rensing refused to be a substitute and left the stadium and went home. Robin Heller subsequently took the substitutes bench. Büskens was sacked on 30 November 2013, a day after a 2–0 loss to Karlsruher SC. He finished with a record of five wins, four draws and eight losses.

=== Return to Greuther Fürth ===
Büskens was hired for the second time on 23 February 2015. His first match was a 2–1 loss against 1. FC Kaiserslautern on 27 February 2015. Then on 7 March 2015, Fürth and VfR Aalen finished in a 1–1 draw. In a Bavarian derby on 13 March 2015, Fürth lost 3–0 to 1860 München. Büskens resigned on 28 May 2015. He finished with a record of two wins, four draws and six losses.

=== Rapid Wien ===
Büskens was hired by Rapid Wien on 7 June 2016. He signed a one-year contract with an option. He replaced Zoran Barisic. His first training session was on 10 June 2016.

On 7 November 2016, Büskens was relieved of his duties.

=== Return to Schalke 04 ===
Büskens returned to Schalke on 14 March 2019 as an assistant manager.

On 7 March 2022, after the dismissal of Dimitrios Grammozis, he took over the team as head coach on an interim basis until the end of the 2021–22 season. Schalke won the 2. Bundesliga title after winning eight out of nine games under Büskens' management.

== Managerial statistics ==
Team	From	To	Record					
Team	From	To	G	W	D	L	Win %	Ref.
Schalke 04 II	1 July 2005	13 April 2008	96	53	16	27	55.21	
Schalke 04	13 April 2008	30 June 2008	6	5	1	0	83.33	
Schalke 04	27 March 2009	23 June 2009	9	4	1	4	44.44	
Greuther Fürth	27 December 2009	20 February 2013	116	50	33	33	43.10	
Fortuna Düsseldorf	4 June 2013	30 November 2013	17	5	4	8	29.41	
Greuther Fürth	23 February 2015	28 May 2015	12	2	4	6	16.67	
Rapid Wien	7 June 2016	7 November 2016	25	11	8	6	44.00	
Schalke 04	7 March 2022	15 May 2022	9	8	0	1	88.89	
Total			290	138	67	85	47.59	—

== Honours ==
=== Player ===
Fortuna Düsseldorf

- 2. Bundesliga: 1988–89

Schalke 04

- UEFA Cup: 1996–97
- DFB-Pokal: 2000–01, 2001–02

=== Manager ===
Greuther Fürth

- 2. Bundesliga: 2011–12

Schalke 04

- 2. Bundesliga: 2021–22
