= Oliver Reck =

German footballer (born 1965)

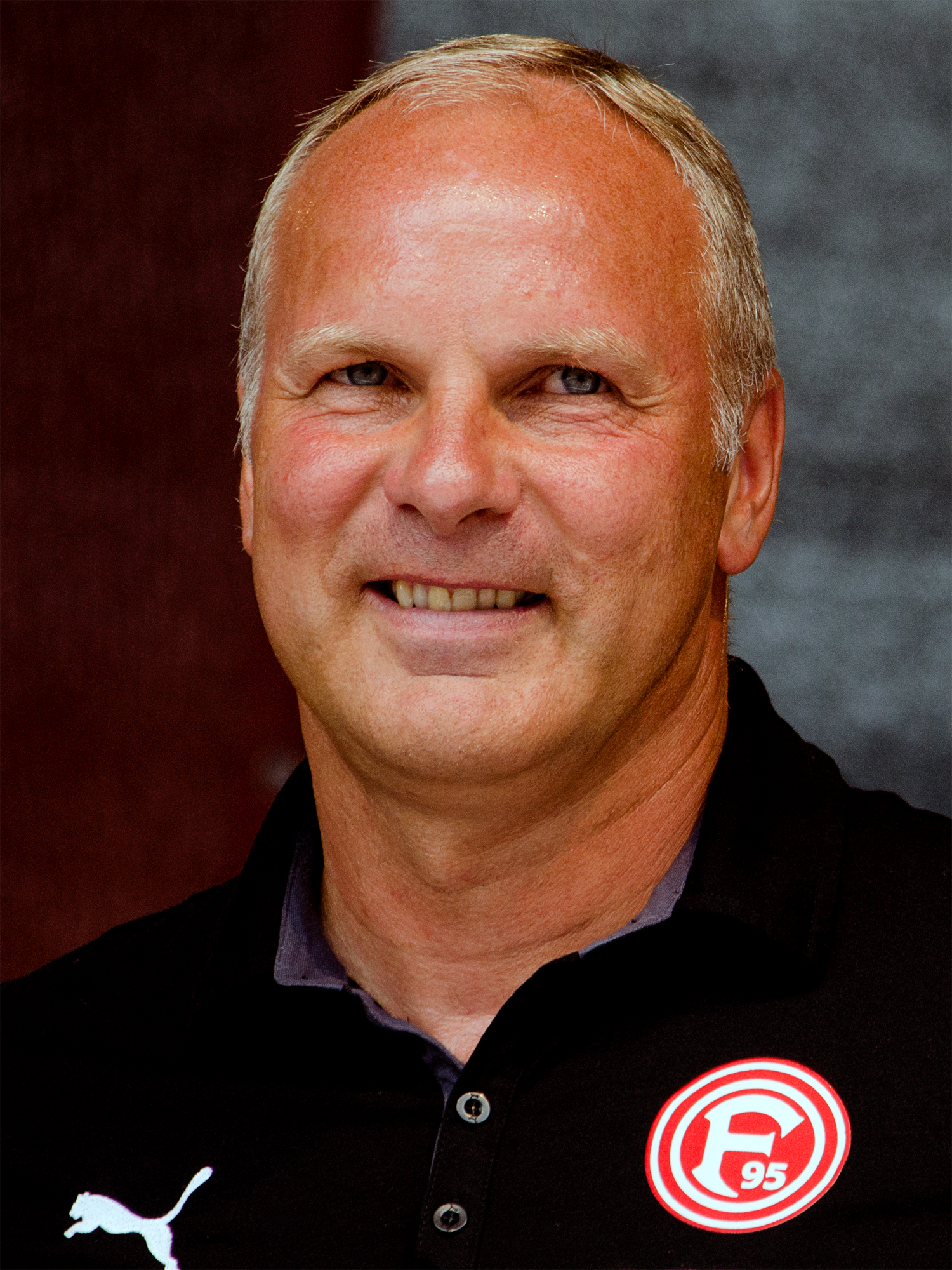
- Reck with Fortuna Düsseldorf in 2014

Personal information
- Date of birth: 27 February 1965 (age 61)
- Place of birth: Frankfurt, West Germany
- Height: 1.93 m (6 ft 4 in)
- Position: Goalkeeper

Senior career*
Years	Team	Apps	(Gls)
1983–1985	Kickers Offenbach	52	(0)
1985–1998	Werder Bremen	345	(0)
1998–2003	Schalke 04	112	(1)
Total		509	(1)

International career
1996	Germany	1	(0)

Managerial career
- 2009: Schalke 04 (interim)
- 2011–2012: MSV Duisburg
- 2013–2014: Fortuna Düsseldorf (interim)
- 2014–2015: Fortuna Düsseldorf
- 2016–2018: Kickers Offenbach
- 2019–2022: SSV Jeddeloh
- 2022: Rot-Weiß Koblenz
Medal record
Men's football
Representing Germany
UEFA European Championship
Winner	1996 England
Olympic Games
Bronze medal – third place	1988 Seoul	Team
- * Club domestic league appearances and goals

Oliver Reck (born 27 February 1965) is a German football manager and former player.

In a 20-year professional career, he played as a goalkeeper and was best known for his stints with Werder Bremen and Schalke 04, for whom he appeared in more than 500 official games combined, 471 in the Bundesliga alone.

== Club career ==
Reck started his professional career with Kickers Offenbach in the 1983–84 Bundesliga; he played 18 matches as his team were relegated.

In 1985, he joined SV Werder Bremen, being the side's undisputed starter for 11 of his 13 seasons, while also being instrumental in the club's conquests, which included two leagues and the 1992 Cup Winners' Cup. However Reck was suspended for the 1992 European Cup Winners' Cup final, in which he was replaced by Jürgen Rollmann.

Reck moved to FC Schalke 04 in 1998, aged 33, still amassing a further 112 league matches. In his last season, he played second-fiddle to Frank Rost, and chose to retire. Although Oliver Kahn holds the record for most matches without conceding goals in the league, at 180 in a total of 515 matches, Reck is the most effective goalkeeper, not conceding a goal in 173 of 471 matches, with an "effectivity rate" of 0.367, versus Kahn's 0.349.

On 9 February 2002, in his penultimate year, Reck scored a penalty kick for Schalke in a 4–0 home win against FC St. Pauli.

== International career ==
Reck played once for Germany, on 4 June 1996 in a 9–1 friendly win against Liechtenstein. He was a member of the 1996 European Championship-winning squad as a third-choice goalkeeper behind Andreas Köpke and Oliver Kahn.

== Managerial career ==
After retiring, he became the goalkeeping coach at Schalke 04. After the sacking of Fred Rutten in March 2009, he became interim manager, alongside Youri Mulder and Mike Büskens until the end of the season.

Reck replaced Milan Šašić as manager of MSV Duisburg on an interim basis on 28 October 2011. His first match was a 3–0 loss against 1860 München on 30 October 2011. Reck was later made permanent manager, but he was sacked on 27 August 2012 just 3 matches into the new season.

In July 2013, Reck became goalkeeper coach at Fortuna Düsseldorf. Following the sacking of Mike Büskens he was made interim coach of Fortuna Düsseldorf on 2 December 2013. Reck finished his interim position when Fortuna Düsseldorf hired Lorenz-Günther Köstner as the new head coach, and he returned as goalkeeper coach. After Fortuna dissolved the contract with Köstner in June 2013, Reck returned to the position as head coach in Düsseldorf.

On 23 February 2015 he was sacked after only picking up a point from three matches after the winter break. His final match was a 3–1 loss the previous day against 1. FC Nürnberg.

On 27 January 2016 Oliver Reck became the coach of Regionalliga Südwest team Kickers Offenbach. However, as of 27 May 2016, the future of the club is in doubt due to heavy debts. Reck is, however, reportedly wanting to stay at the club. In April 2018 it was announced that Reck would leave Offenbach at the end of his contract on 30 June 2018.

In December 2019, fourth-tier club SSV Jeddeloh announced Reck would take over as manager on a contract until end of the 2019–20 season. In March 2020, a contract extension until summer 2021 was announced.

== Managerial record ==
As of 30 June 2018

Team	From	To	Record							
Team	From	To	G	W	D	L	GF	GA	GD	Win %
Schalke 04	1 April 2009	30 June 2009	9	4	1	4	13	8	+5	44.44
MSV Duisburg	28 October 2011	27 August 2012	26	9	6	11	32	39	−7	34.62
Fortuna Düsseldorf	2 December 2013	30 December 2013	3	2	0	1	6	4	+2	66.67
Fortuna Düsseldorf	13 June 2014	23 February 2015	23	8	8	7	35	32	+3	34.78
Kickers Offenbach	27 January 2016	30 June 2018	92	46	20	26	170	119	+51	50.00
Total			153	69	35	49	256	202	+54	45.10

== Honours ==
Werder Bremen

- Bundesliga: 1987–88, 1992–93
- DFB-Pokal: 1990–91, 1993–94; runner-up: 1988–89, 1989–90
- DFL-Supercup: 1988, 1993, 1994
- UEFA Cup Winners' Cup: 1991–92

Schalke 04

- DFB-Pokal: 2000–01, 2001–02
- DFB-Ligapokal runner-up: 2001, 2002

Germany U23

- Summer Olympics Bronze medal: 1988

Germany

- UEFA European Football Championship: 1996
