= Nico Van Kerckhoven =

Belgian footballer

Personal information
- Full name: Nicolas Van Kerckhoven
- Date of birth: 14 December 1970 (age 55)
- Place of birth: Lier, Belgium
- Height: 1.89 m (6 ft 2 in)
- Position: Left-back

Senior career*
Years	Team	Apps	(Gls)
1990–1998	Lierse	212	(20)
1998–2004	Schalke 04	134	(5)
2004–2005	Borussia M'gladbach	19	(0)
2005–2010	Westerlo	115	(1)
Total		480	(26)

International career
1996–2002	Belgium	42	(3)

Managerial career
- 2017–: Lierse (assistant)
- * Club domestic league appearances and goals

Nicolas "Nico" Van Kerckhoven (Dutch pronunciation: [ˈnikoː vɑŋ ˈkɛr(ə)kɦoːvə(n)]; born 14 December 1970) is a Belgian former professional footballer who played as a left-back. His former clubs include Lierse, FC Schalke 04 and K.V.C. Westerlo. He represented Belgium at two World Cups in 1998 and 2002.

== Honours ==
Lierse

- Belgian First Division: 1996–97
- Belgian Super Cup: 1997

Schalke 04

- DFP Pokal: 2000–01, 2001–02
- UEFA Intertoto Cup: 2003

Belgium

- FIFA Fair Play Trophy: 2002 World Cup
