= Jiří Němec =

Czech footballer (born 1966)

Personal information
- Date of birth: 15 May 1966 (age 60)
- Place of birth: Pacov, Czechoslovakia
- Height: 1.76 m (5 ft 9 in)
- Position: Midfielder

Senior career*
Years	Team	Apps	(Gls)
1985–1987	České Budějovice	58	(2)
1987–1990	Dukla Prague	81	(5)
1990–1993	Sparta Prague	83	(6)
1993–2002	Schalke 04	256	(6)
2002–2003	Chmel Blšany	27	(0)
2003	Sparta Prague	12	(0)
2004	Viktoria Žižkov	12	(0)
Total		529	(19)

International career
1990–1993	Czechoslovakia	20	(0)
1994–2001	Czech Republic	64	(1)
Medal record
Men's football
Representing Czech Republic
UEFA European Championship
Runner-up	1996 England
- * Club domestic league appearances and goals

Jiří Němec (born 15 May 1966) is a Czech former professional footballer who played as a midfielder. He started his professional career playing football in Czechoslovakia, winning two titles with Sparta Prague. He then moved to Germany, where he played until 2002, when he moved back to the Czech Republic and finished his active career.

In an 11-year international career Němec was named in his country's squad for one FIFA World Cup and two UEFA European Championships. He scored once and made a combined total of 84 international appearances for the Czechoslovakia and Czech Republic national teams.

== Club career ==
Němec made his professional club debut with České Budějovice in 1985. He played in the Czechoslovak First League for České Budějovice, Dukla Prague and Sparta Prague until 1993, during which time he won national titles with Sparta in 1990–91 and 1992–93. He moved to German club Schalke 04 in 1993, being an integral part of its defence when it won the 1997 UEFA Cup Final against Inter Milan. In 2001, Němec extended his contract with Schalke 04 until the end of 2001–02 Bundesliga. Němec returned to the Czech Republic in 2002, signing for Czech First League side Chmel Blšany, for whom he served as captain. Němec moved to Viktoria Žižkov in January 2004. He retired from professional football at the age of 39 on 4 July 2005, citing lack of motivation.

== International career ==
At international level, Němec played for Czechoslovakia and the Czech Republic, serving as captain of both teams. He made a total of 84 appearances for the two teams, scoring one goal for the latter. His sole international goal came in May 1998, when he scored in a 2–2 friendly game against South Korea. As a footballer of Czechoslovakia, Němec was part of the 1990 FIFA World Cup squad that reached quarter finals, but did not play in any match. He went on to play at both the UEFA Euro 1996 and 2000 as a Czech international.

== Coaching ==
After ending his football career, Němec became head coach of the third-tier club SK Sokol Brozany in Litoměřice District, having been working with minor breaks since 2011. He is married to his wife Martina with two children: a daughter named Nikola and son named Patrik.

== Honours ==
Sparta Prague

- Czechoslovak First League: 1990–91, 1992–93
- Czechoslovak Cup: 1989–90, 1991–92

Schalke 04

- DFB-Pokal: 2000–01, 2001–02
- UEFA Cup: 1996–97

Czech Republic

- UEFA European Football Championship: Runner-up Medal 1996

Individual

- Czech Footballer of the Year: 1997
- Golden Ball (Czech Republic): 1997
