= 2000–01 FC Bayern Munich season =

101st season in existence of Bayern Munich

FC Bayern Munich
2000–01 season
- Chairman: Franz Beckenbauer
- Manager: Ottmar Hitzfeld
- Stadium: Olympic Stadium, Munich, Bavaria
- Bundesliga: 1st
- DFB-Pokal: Second round
- DFB-Ligapokal: Winners
- UEFA Champions League: Winners
- Top goalscorer: League: Giovane Élber (15); All: Giovane Élber (21)
- Average home league attendance: 49,706
Home colours	Away colours	Third colours

FC Bayern Munich won a historic double, clinching its first European Cup victory for more than 25 years, as well as clinching its third consecutive league title. The Champions League title was won after the unexpected late defeat to Manchester United in the final two years before.

== Results ==
=== Friendlies ===
==== Opel Master Cup ====
Semifinals	Bayern Munich	3–1	Galatasaray	Munich, Germany
	Santa Cruz 9'; Kuffour 56'; Zickler 83'		Hagi 88'	Stadium: Olympiastadion

5 August Final	Bayern Munich	3–1	Manchester United F.C.	Munich, Germany
	Scholl 45' (pen.); Zickler 62', 69'		Fortune 85'	Stadium: Olympiastadion

==== Other friendlies ====
26 May	New York/New Jersey MetroStars (United States)	2–0	Bayern Munich	East Rutherford, New Jersey, United States
	Mathis 36'; Petke (yellow card) 42'; Comas 43'		Sforza (yellow card) 49'; Hargreaves (yellow card) 84'; Salihamidžić (yellow card) 90'	Stadium: Giants Stadium; Attendance: 30,253; Referee: Noel Kenny

=== Bundesliga ===
==== League results ====
Match	Date	Ground	Opponent	Score^{1}	Pos.	Pts.	GD	Report
1	12 August	H	Hertha BSC	4 – 1	2	3	4	Report / Report link; Kick off / 20:15 CEST; Attendance / 57,000; Referee / Markus Merk; Bayern Munich / Hertha BSC; Scholl 9' (pen.); Jancker 65'; Zickler 81'; Salihamidžić 88'; Sforza (yellow card) / Daei 89'
2	19 August	A	VfL Bochum	3 – 0	1	6	6	Report / Report link; Kick off / 15:30 CEST; Attendance / 32,645 (sell-out); Referee / Alfons Berg; VfL Bochum / Bayern Munich; Schindzielorz (yellow card) / Jancker 16', 23'; Santa Cruz 19'
3	6 September	H	VfL Wolfsburg	3 – 1	1	9	8	Report / Report link; Kick off / 20:15 CEST; Attendance / 41,000; Referee / Lutz Wagner; Bayern Munich / VfL Wolfsburg; Scholl 19' (pen.); Jancker 36'; Thorsten Fink 87' / Akonnor 59' (yellow card); O'Neil (yellow card); Kryger (yellow card); Kühbauer (yellow card)
4	9 September	A	VfB Stuttgart	1 – 2	2	9	7	Report / Report link; Kick off / 15:30 CEST; Attendance / 51,200 (sell-out); Referee / Bernd Heynemann; VfB Stuttgart / Bayern Munich; Thiam 30'; Balakov 62'; Hildebrand (yellow card); Bordon (yellow card); Carnell (yellow card) / Jancker 5'; Santa Cruz (yellow card); Salihamidžić (yellow card); Fink (yellow card)
5	16 September	H	SpVgg Unterhaching	3 – 1	1	12	9	Report / Report link; Kick off / 20:15 CEST; Attendance / 48,000; Referee / Jürgen Jansen; Bayern Munich / SpVgg Unterhaching; Élber 37'; Scholl 70' (pen.); Jancker 83' (yellow card); Salihamidžić (yellow card) / Schwarz 21'
6	23 September	A	1. FC Köln	2 – 1	1	15	10	Report / Report link; Kick off / 15:30 CEST; Attendance / 41,000 (sell-out); Referee / Hellmut Krug; 1. FC Köln / Bayern Munich; Scherz 41' / Élber 15'; Santa Cruz 73'
7	30 September	H	Hansa Rostock	0 – 1	1	15	9	Report / Report link; Kick off / 15:30 CEST; Attendance / 60,000; Referee / Alfons Berg; Bayern Munich / Hansa Rostock; Linke (yellow card) / Brand 15'; Lantz (yellow card); Ridlewicz (yellow card)
8	14 October	A	Energie Cottbus	0 – 1	3	15	8	Report / Report link; Kick off / 15:30 CEST; Attendance / 20,500 (sell-out); Referee / Markus Merk; Energie Cottbus / Bayern Munich; Sebők 14'; Akrapović (yellow card) / Tarnat (yellow card); Scholl (yellow card); Jancker (yellow card); Salihamidžić (yellow card); Sagnol (yellow card)
9	21 October	H	1860 Munich	3 – 1	1	18	10	Report / Report link; Kick off / 15:30 CEST; Attendance / 69,000 (sell-out); Referee / Jürgen Aust; Bayern Munich / 1860 Munich; Élber 45', 65'; Salihamidžić 56'; Jeremies (yellow card) / Häßler 75'; Borimirov (yellow card) 82' (red card); Bierofka (yellow card); Beierle (yellow card); Ehlers (yellow card); Mykland (yellow card)
10	28 October	A	Werder Bremen	1 – 1	2	19	10	Report / Report link; Kick off / 15:30 CEST; Attendance / 35,282 (sell-out); Referee / Herbert Fandel; Werder Bremen / Bayern Munich; Ailton 11' (pen.); Frings (yellow card); Krstajić (yellow card) / Paulo Sérgio 6'; Kahn (yellow card); Fink (yellow card); Scholl (yellow card)
11	4 November	H	Borussia Dortmund	6 – 2	2	22	14	Report / Report link; Kick off / 20:15 CET; Attendance / 62,000; Referee / Hartmut Strampe; Bayern Munich / Borussia Dortmund; Salihamidžić 7', 83'; Élber 10' (yellow card); Scholl 39', 58' (yellow card); Paulo Sérgio 64'; Jeremies (yellow card); Fink (yellow card) / Herrlich 2'; Addo 72' (yellow card); Heinrich (yellow card) 84' (red card); Dedê (yellow card); Lehmann (yellow card); Nijhuis (yellow card)
12	11 November	A	Schalke 04	2 – 3	2	22	13	Report / Report link; Kick off / 15:30 CET; Attendance / 62,109 (sell-out); Referee / Bernd Heynemann; Schalke 04 / Bayern Munich; Möller 58'; Asamoah 68'; Sand 71'; Němec (yellow card); Büskens (yellow card) van Hoogdalem (yellow card) / Élber 33'; Paulo Sérgio 59' (yellow card); Tarnat (yellow card); Jeremies (yellow card); Effenberg (yellow card); Salihamidžić (yellow card)
13	18 November	H	Eintracht Frankfurt	1 – 2	4	22	12	Report / Report link; Kick off / 15:30 CET; Attendance / 47,000; Referee / Edgar Steinborn; Bayern Munich / Eintracht Frankfurt; Paulo Sérgio 13'; Élber (yellow card); Tarnat (yellow card) / Schur 38'; Fjørtoft 63'; Kracht (yellow card)
14	25 November	A	SC Freiburg	1 – 1	4	23	12	Report / Report link; Kick off / 15:30 CET; Attendance / 25,000 (sell-out); Referee / Herbert Fandel; SC Freiburg / Bayern Munich; But 26' (yellow card); Kondé (yellow card); Baya (yellow card); Zeyer (yellow card) / Jancker 18' (yellow card); Effenberg (yellow card); Linke (yellow card); Salihamidžić (yellow card); Kahn (yellow card)
15	2 December	H	Bayer Leverkusen	2 – 0	4	26	14	Report / Report link; Kick off / 20:15 CET; Attendance / 48,000; Referee / Hellut Krug; Bayern Munich / Bayer Leverkusen; Jancker 5' (yellow card); Élber 48'; Sagnol (yellow card); Effenberg (yellow card); Kuffour (yellow card) / Ponte (red card) 52'; Kovač (yellow card); Kirsten (yellow card)
16	9 December	A	1. FC Kaiserslautern	0 – 0	5	27	14	Report / Report link; Kick off / 20:15 CET; Attendance / 41,500 (sell-out); Referee / Jürgen Aust; 1. FC Kaiserslautern / Bayern Munich; H. Koch (yellow card) / Tarnat (yellow card); Linke (yellow card); Salihamidžić (yellow card); Kahn (yellow card); Jancker (yellow card); Effenberg (yellow card)
17	13 December	H	Hamburger SV	2 – 1	3	30	15	Report / Report link; Kick off / 20:15 CET; Attendance / 32,000; Referee / Hartmut Strampe; Bayern Munich / Hamburger SV; Élber 64', 67'; Paulo Sérgio (yellow card); Tarnat (yellow card) / Barbarez 28' (yellow card); Kovač (yellow card); Ujfaluši (yellow card); Panadić (yellow card)
18	17 December	A	Hertha BSC	3 – 1	2	33	17	Report / Report link; Kick off / 17:30 CET; Attendance / 57,169 (sell-out); Referee / Alfons Berg; Hertha BSC / Bayern Munich; Preetz 25' van Burik (yellow card) / Santa Cruz 16'; Effenberg 33' (pen.); Zickler 60'; Jeremies (yellow card); Sforza (yellow card)
19	27 January	H	VfL Bochum	3 – 2	2	36	18	Report / Report link; Kick off / 15:30 CET; Attendance / 32,000; Referee / Edgar Steinborn; Bayern Munich / VfL Bochum; Effenberg 21', 89'; Élber 53' / Baştürk 41', 59'; Mandreko (yellow card)
20	3 February	A	VfL Wolfsburg	3 – 1	1	39	20	Report / Report link; Kick off / 15:30 CET; Attendance / 20,400 (sell-out); Referee / Lutz Michael Fröhlich; VfL Wolfsburg / Bayern Munich; Juskowiak 27' / Élber 13', 60'; Scholl 45'; Kuffour (yellow card)
21	10 February	H	VfB Stuttgart	1 – 0	1	42	21	Report / Report link; Kick off / 15:30 CET; Attendance / 41,000; Referee / Uwe Kemmling; Bayern Munich / VfB Stuttgart; Giovane 8'; Lizarazu (yellow card); Effenberg (yellow card); Sagnol (yellow card); Scholl (yellow card) / Gerber (yellow card)
22	17 February	A	SpVgg Unterhaching	0 – 1	1	42	20	Report / Report link; Kick off / 15:30 CET; Attendance / 15,000 (sell-out); Referee / Lutz Wagner; SpVgg Unterhaching / Bayern Munich; Spiżak 57' / Hargreaves (yellow card); Fink (yellow card)
23	24 February	H	1. FC Köln	1 – 1	1	43	20	Report / Report link; Kick off / 15:30 CET; Attendance / 36,000; Referee / Bernd Heynemann; Bayern Munich / 1. FC Köln; Jancker 65' (yellow card) / Kreuz 25'; Sichone (yellow card); Voigt (yellow card); Cullmann (yellow card)
24	3 March	A	Hansa Rostock	2 – 3	2	43	19	Report / Report link; Kick off / 15:30 CET; Attendance / 20,500 (sell-out); Referee / Markus Merk; Hansa Rostock / Bayern Munich; Agali 29'; Salou 51'; Jakobsson 61' / Kuffour 33'; Jeremies 66' (yellow card); Kahn (yellow card) 90' (red card); Lizarazu (yellow card); Effenberg (yellow card); Élber (yellow card)
25	10 March	H	Energie Cottbus	2 – 0	1	46	21	Report / Report link; Kick off / 15:30 CET; Attendance / 38,000; Referee / Michael Weiner; Bayern Munich / Energie Cottbus; Scholl 24'; Effenberg 38'; Linke (yellow card); Jancker (yellow card); Paulo Sérgio (yellow card) / Sebők (yellow card)
26	17 March	A	1860 Munich	2 – 0	1	49	23	Report / Report link; Kick off / 20:15 CET; Attendance / 69,000 (sell-out); Referee / Hellmut Krug; 1860 Munich / Bayern Munich; / Élber 48'; Paulo Sérgio 80'; Scholl (yellow card); Jeremies (yellow card); Salihamidžić (yellow card)
27	31 March	H	Werder Bremen	2 – 3	1	49	22	Report / Report link; Kick off / 15:30 CEST; Attendance / 45,000; Referee / Florian Meyer; Bayern Munich / Werder Bremen; Élber 47' (yellow card); Jancker 65'; Tarnat (yellow card); Jeremies (yellow card); Effenberg (yellow card) / Pizarro 25' (pen.), 88'; Bode 58'; Banović (yellow card); Baumann (yellow card); Verlaat (yellow card)
28	7 April	A	Borussia Dortmund	1 – 1	1	50	22	Report / Report link; Kick off / 20:15 CEST; Attendance / 68,600 (sell-out); Referee / Hartmut Strampe; Borussia Dortmund / Bayern Munich; Bobic 52'; Evanílson (red card) 90'; Addo (yellow card); Oliseh (yellow card) / Santa Cruz 6'; Lizarazu (yellow card) 35' (red card); Effenberg (red card) 55'; Kuffour (yellow card); Giovane (yellow card); Jeremies (yellow card); Linke (yellow card); Salihamidžić (yellow card); Scholl (yellow card); Kahn (yellow card); Sagnol (yellow card)
29	14 April	H	Schalke 04	1 – 3	2	50	20	Report / Report link; Kick off / 15:30 CEST; Attendance / 63,000 (sell-out); Referee / Jürgen Aust; Bayern Munich / Schalke 04; Jancker 3'; Sagnol (yellow card); Kuffour (yellow card); Jeremies (yellow card); Salihamidžić (yellow card) / Sand 14', 48', 76'; Möller (yellow card); Wałdoch (yellow card)
30	21 April	A	Eintracht Frankfurt	2 – 0	2	53	22	Report / Report link; Kick off / 15:30 CEST; Attendance / 57,000 (sell-out); Referee / Jürgen Jansen; Eintracht Frankfurt / Bayern Munich; Bindewald (yellow card) / Scholl 22'; Tarnat 90'; Zickler (yellow card)
31	28 April	H	SC Freiburg	1 – 0	2	56	23	Report / Report link; Kick off / 15:30 CEST; Attendance / 63,000 (sell-out); Referee / Edgar Steinborn; Bayern Munich / SC Freiburg; Scholl 64'; Effenberg (yellow card)
32	5 May	A	Bayer Leverkusen	1 – 0	2	59	24	Report / Report link; Kick off / 15:30 CEST; Attendance / 22,500 (sell-out); Referee / Bernd Heynemann; Bayer Leverkusen / Bayern Munich; Ballack (yellow card) / Santa Cruz 87'; Jeremies (yellow card); Linke (yellow card)
33	12 May	H	1. FC Kaiserslautern	2 – 1	1	62	25	Report / Report link; Kick off / 15:30 CEST; Attendance / 63,000 (sell-out); Referee / Lutz Wagner; Bayern Munich / 1. FC Kaiserslautern; Jancker 56' (yellow card); Zickler 90'; Salihamidžić (yellow card) / Lokvenc 5'; Strasser (yellow card); Grammozis (yellow card)
34	19 May	A	Hamburger SV	1 – 1	1	63	25	Report / Report link; Kick off / 15:30 CEST; Attendance / 55,280 (sell-out); Referee / Markus Merk; Hamburger SV / Bayern Munich; Barbarez 90'; Heinz (yellow card); Hertzsch (yellow card); Hollerbach (yellow card); Tøfting (yellow card) / Andersson 90+4'; Scholl (yellow card); Kuffour (yellow card)

^{1}Bayern Munich goals come first.
Ground's country's flag and opponent's country's flag shown when from a different country of Bayern Munich.
Pos. = Position in league, Pts. = Points, GD = Goal difference, Ground: H = Home, A = Away, N = Neutral, HR = Home replacement, AR = Away replacement.

=== DFB-Pokal ===
26 August First round	FC Schönberg 95	0–4	Bayern Munich	Schönberg
15:30 CEST	Moustapha (yellow card); Adigo (yellow card)		Scholl 30' (pen.); Zickler 43'; Fink 51'; Jancker 90'	Stadium: Jahnstadion; Attendance: 16,000; Referee: Lutz Michael Fröhlich

1 November Second round	1. FC Magdeburg	1–1 (a.e.t.) (4–2 p)	Bayern Munich	Magdeburg
20:30 CET	Ofodile 66' (yellow card); Hannemann (yellow card)		Salihamidžić 79'; Wiesinger (yellow card)	Stadium: Ernst Grube Stadium; Attendance: 26,000; Referee: Jürgen Jansen
	Penalties
	Schmidt (penalty scored); Ivanovic (penalty scored); Golombek (penalty scored); Hannemann (penalty scored)		Paulo Sérgio (penalty scored); Jeremies (penalty missed); Élber (penalty missed); Sagnol (penalty scored)

=== DFB-Ligapokal ===
30 July Semifinals	Bayern Munich	4–1	1. FC Kaiserslautern	Augsburg
17:30 CET	Jancker 5'; Scholl 31'; Wiesinger 48'; Santa Cruz 78'; Tarnat (yellow card)		Buck 33'; Grammozis (yellow card)	Stadium: Rosenaustadion; Attendance: 13,500; Referee: Rainer Werthmann

1 August Final	Hertha BSC	1–5	Bayern Munich	Leverkusen
20:30 CET	Michalke 61' (yellow card)		Zickler 50', 66', 85'; Jancker 53'; Eyjólfur 57' (o.g.); Hargreaves (yellow card)	Stadium: BayArena; Attendance: 12,500; Referee: Hellmut Krug

=== Champions League ===
==== Group stage results ====
===== 1st Group Stage =====
Pos	Team	Pld	W	D	L	GF	GA	GD	Pts	Qualification	BAY	PAR	ROS	HEL
1	(Germany) Bayern Munich	6	3	2	1	9	4	+5	11	Advance to second group stage	—	2–0	3–1	0–0
2	(France) Paris Saint-Germain	6	3	1	2	14	9	+5	10	Advance to second group stage	1–0	—	7–2	4–1
3	(Norway) Rosenborg	6	2	1	3	13	15	−2	7	Transfer to UEFA Cup	1–1	3–1	—	6–1
4	(Sweden) Helsingborgs IF	6	1	2	3	6	14	−8	5		1–3	1–1	2–0	—

Source: UEFA

13 September 1	Helsingborgs IF (Sweden)	1–3	(Germany) Bayern Munich	Helsingborg, Sweden
20:45 CEST	Nilsson (yellow card) 53'; Johansen 90'		Scholl 7'; Kuffour (red card) 38'; Salihamidžić 48'; Jancker 55'; Lizarazu (yellow card) 73'	Stadium: Olympia; Attendance: 12,623; Referee: Graham Barber (England)

19 September 2	Bayern Munich (Germany)	3–1	(Norway) Rosenborg	Munich, Germany
20:45 CEST	Jancker 73'; Élber 76'; Linke 79'; Scholl (yellow card) 90'		Basma (yellow card) 8'; Berg (yellow card) 18'; Sørensen 38'; Winsnes (yellow card) 52'	Stadium: Olympiastadion; Attendance: 20,000; Referee: Juan Antonio Fernandez Marin (Spain)

26 September 3	Paris Saint-Germain (France)	1–0	(Germany) Bayern Munich	Paris, France
20:45 CEST	Luccin (yellow card) 12'; Rabésandratana (yellow card) 34'; Leroy 90', (yellow card) 90'		Jancker (yellow card) 36'	Stadium: Parc des Princes; Attendance: 42,000; Referee: Domenico Messina (Italy)

18 October 4	Bayern Munich (Germany)	2–0	(France) Paris Saint-Germain	Munich, Germany
20:45 CEST	Salihamidžić 3', (yellow card) 50'; Paulo Sérgio 89'		Mendy (yellow card) 50'; Rabésandratana (yellow card) 69'	Stadium: Olympiastadion; Attendance: 33,000; Referee: Vítor Melo Pereira (Portugal)

24 October 5	Bayern Munich (Germany)	0–0	(Sweden) Helsingborgs IF	Munich, Germany
20:45 CEST	Scholl (yellow card) 72'; Salihamidžić (yellow card) 90'		Hansson (yellow card) 82'	Stadium: Olympiastadion; Attendance: 19,000; Referee: Kyros Vassaras (Greece)

8 November 6	Rosenborg (Norway)	1–1	(Germany) Bayern Munich	Trondheim, Norway
20:45 CET	Johnsen 27'		Sagnol (yellow card) 33'; Salihamidžić (yellow card) 39'; Jeremies 88'	Stadium: Lerkendal Stadion; Attendance: 14,200; Referee: René Temmink (Netherlands)

===== 2nd Group Stage =====
Pos	Team	Pld	W	D	L	GF	GA	GD	Pts	Qualification	BAY	ARS	LYO	SPM
1	(Germany) Bayern Munich	6	4	1	1	8	5	+3	13	Advance to knockout stage	—	1–0	1–0	1–0
2	(England) Arsenal	6	2	2	2	6	8	−2	8	Advance to knockout stage	2–2	—	1–1	1–0
3	(France) Lyon	6	2	2	2	8	4	+4	8		3–0	0–1	—	3–0
4	(Russia) Spartak Moscow	6	1	1	4	5	10	−5	4		0–3	4–1	1–1	—

Source: UEFA

22 November 1	Bayern Munich (Germany)	1–0	(France) Lyon	Munich, Germany
20:45 CET	Effenberg (yellow card) 47'; Jeremies 55', (yellow card) 62'; Paulo Sérgio (yellow card) 68'; Fink (yellow card) 78'		Deflandre (yellow card) 10'; Marlet (yellow card) 39'	Stadium: Olympiastadion; Attendance: 18,000; Referee: José María García-Aranda (Spain)

5 December 2	Arsenal (England)	2–2	(Germany) Bayern Munich	London, England
20:45 CET	Henry 3'; Kanu 54'; Ljungberg (yellow card) 64'; Grimandi (yellow card) 70'		Sforza (yellow card) 27'; Tarnat 56'; Scholl 66'; Jeremies (yellow card) 89'	Stadium: Arsenal Stadium; Attendance: 35,318; Referee: Stefano Braschi (Italy)

13 February 3	Bayern Munich (Germany)	1–0	(Russia) Spartak Moscow	Munich, Germany
20:45 CET	Jeremies (yellow card) 35'; Lizarazu (yellow card) 60'; Élber 79'		Ananko (yellow card) 11'; Kovtun (yellow card) 29'; Marcão (yellow card) 42'; Titov (yellow card) 76'	Stadium: Olympiastadion; Attendance: 31,000; Referee: Knud Erik Fisker (Denmark)

21 February 4	Spartak Moscow (Russia)	0–3	(Germany) Bayern Munich	Moscow, Russia
20:00 CET	Ananko (yellow card) 40'; Irismetov (yellow card) 56'		Scholl 17', 75' (pen.); Fink (yellow card) 25'; Effenberg (yellow card) 50'; Lizarazu (yellow card) 54'; Linke (yellow card) 82'; Paulo Sérgio 87'	Stadium: Luzhniki Stadium; Attendance: 60,000; Referee: Antonio Jesús López Nieto (Spain)

6 March 5	Lyon (France)	3–0	(Germany) Bayern Munich	Lyon, France
20:45 CET	Govou (yellow card) 8', (goal) 13', 20'; Laigle (yellow card) 27', (goal) 71'; Deflandre (yellow card) 45'; Coupet (yellow card) 63'		Linke (yellow card) 44'; Salihamidžić (yellow card) 69'; Effenberg (yellow card) 86'	Stadium: Stade de Gerland; Attendance: 39,460; Referee: Dick Jol (Netherlands)

14 March 6	Bayern Munich (Germany)	1–0	(England) Arsenal	Munich, Germany
18:55 CET	Élber 10'; Lizarazu (yellow card) 80'		Vieira (yellow card) 44'; Dixon (yellow card) 45'; Henry (yellow card) 85'	Stadium: Olympiastadion; Attendance: 58,000; Referee: Anders Frisk (Sweden)

==== Knockout stage ====
===== Quarterfinals =====
3 April 1st leg	Manchester United (England)	0–1	(Germany) Bayern Munich	Manchester, England
20:45 CEST	Beckham (yellow card) 23'		Salihamidžić (yellow card) 28'; Effenberg (yellow card) 38'; Lizarazu (yellow card) 84'; Paulo Sérgio 86'	Stadium: Old Trafford; Attendance: 66,584; Referee: Antonio Jesús López Nieto (Spain)

18 April 2nd leg	Bayern Munich (Germany)	2–1 (3–1 agg.)	(England) Manchester United	Munich, Germany
20:45 CEST	Élber 5'; Scholl 39'		Giggs 49'	Stadium: Olympiastadion; Attendance: 60,000; Referee: Vítor Melo Pereira (Portugal)

===== Semifinals =====
1 May 1st leg	Real Madrid (Spain)	0–1	(Germany) Bayern Munich	Madrid, Spain
20:45 CEST	Munitis (yellow card) 86'; Hierro (yellow card) 90'		Élber 55'; Kahn (yellow card) 59'; Effenberg (yellow card) 78'	Stadium: Santiago Bernabéu Stadium; Attendance: 75,000; Referee: Hugh Dallas (Scotland)

9 May 2nd leg	Bayern Munich (Germany)	2–1 (3–1 agg.)	(Spain) Real Madrid	Munich, Germany
20:45 CEST	Élber 8'; Jeremies (yellow card) 21' (goal) 35'; Sforza (yellow card) 73'		Helguera (yellow card) 11'; Figo 18'; Hierro (yellow card) 49'; Guti (yellow card) 73'	Stadium: Olympiastadion; Attendance: 60,000; Referee: Kim Milton Nielsen (Denmark)

===== Final =====
23 May Final	Bayern Munich (Germany)	1–1 (a.e.t.) (5–4 p)	(Spain) Valencia	Milan, Italy
20:45 CEST	Andersson (yellow card) 38'; Effenberg 50' (pen.)		Mendieta 2' (pen.); Carboni (yellow card) 26'; K. González (yellow card) 107'; Cañizares (yellow card) 120'	Stadium: San Siro; Attendance: 74,500; Referee: Dick Jol (Netherlands)
	Penalties
	Paulo Sérgio (penalty missed); Salihamidžić (penalty scored); Zickler (penalty scored); Andersson (penalty missed); Effenberg (penalty scored); Lizarazu (penalty scored); Linke (penalty scored)		(penalty scored) Mendieta; (penalty scored) Carew; (penalty missed) Zahovič; (penalty missed) Carboni; (penalty scored) Baraja; (penalty scored) Kily González; (penalty missed) Pellegrino

== Team statistics ==
Competition	First match	Last match	Starting round	Final position	Record							
Competition	First match	Last match	Starting round	Final position	G	W	D	L	GF	GA	GD	Win %
Bundesliga	12 August	19 May	Matchday 1	1st	34	19	6	9	62	37	+25	55.88
DFB-Pokal	26 August	1 November	First round	Second round	2	1	1	0	5	1	+4	50.00
DFB-Ligapokal	30 July	1 August	Semifinals	Winner	2	2	0	0	9	2	+7	100.00
Champions League	13 September	23 May	Group stage	Winner	17	11	4	2	24	12	+12	64.71
Total					55	33	11	11	100	52	+48	60.00

== Squad statistics ==
=== Squad, appearances and goals ===
No.	Pos	Nat	Player	Total		Bundesliga		DFB-Pokal		Ligapokal		Champions League	
No.	Pos	Nat	Player	Apps	Goals	Apps	Goals	Apps	Goals	Apps	Goals	Apps	Goals
1	GK	(Germany) GER	Oliver Kahn (vice-captain)	52	0	32+0	0	2+0	0	2+0	0	16+0	0
22	GK	(Germany) GER	Bernd Dreher	1	0	1+0	0	0+0	0	0+0	0	0+0	0
33	GK	(Germany) GER	Stefan Wessels	3	0	1+0	0	0+0	0	0+0	0	1+1	0
5	DF	(Sweden) SWE	Patrik Andersson	37	1	20+2	1	1+0	0	1+1	0	12+0	0
29	DF	(Germany) GER	Sebastian Backer	0	0	0+0	0	0+0	0	0+0	0	0+0	0
4	DF	(Ghana) GHA	Samuel Kuffour	38	1	23+0	1	1+0	0	1+0	0	13+0	0
25	DF	(Germany) GER	Thomas Linke	44	1	26+2	0	0+0	0	1+0	0	15+0	1
3	DF	(France) FRA	Bixente Lizarazu	27	0	14+2	0	1+0	0	0+0	0	9+1	0
18	DF	(Germany) GER	Michael Tarnat	38	2	19+4	1	2+0	0	2+0	0	8+3	1
2	DF	(France) FRA	Willy Sagnol	43	0	22+5	0	1+0	0	1+0	0	13+1	0
31	DF	(Germany) GER	Stephan Kling	0	0	0	0	0	0	0	0	0	0
10	MF	(Switzerland) SUI	Ciriaco Sforza	33	0	18+2	0	2+0	0	2+0	0	8+1	0
11	MF	(Germany) GER	Stefan Effenberg (captain)	30	5	20+0	4	0+0	0	0+0	0	10+0	1
17	MF	(Germany) GER	Thorsten Fink	38	2	21+3	1	2+0	1	1+1	0	10+0	0
23	MF	(England) ENG	Owen Hargreaves	20	0	7+7	0	0+1	0	0+1	0	2+2	0
28	MF	(Germany) GER	Patrick Mölzl	0	0	0+0	0	0+0	0	0+0	0	0+0	0
20	MF	(Bosnia and Herzegovina) BIH	Hasan Salihamidžić	50	7	25+6	4	1+1	1	1+1	0	15+0	2
16	MF	(Germany) GER	Jens Jeremies	34	4	19+1	1	0+1	0	1+0	0	10+2	3
7	MF	(Germany) GER	Mehmet Scholl	48	16	24+5	9	1+0	1	1+1	1	14+2	5
8	MF	(Germany) GER	Thomas Strunz	9	0	3+2	0	1+0	0	1+0	0	0+2	0
6	MF	(Germany) GER	Michael Wiesinger	15	1	3+3	0	2+0	0	2+0	1	4+1	0
15	MF	(Poland) POL	Sławomir Wojciechowski	2	0	0+0	0	0+1	0	1+0	0	0+0	0
27	FW	(Turkey) TUR	Berkant Göktan	1	0	0+1	0	0+0	0	0+0	0	0+0	0
24	FW	(Paraguay) PAR	Roque Santa Cruz	28	6	11+8	5	0+1	0	2+0	1	2+4	0
13	FW	(Brazil) BRA	Paulo Sérgio	38	8	16+10	5	1+0	0	0+0	0	3+8	3
9	FW	(Brazil) BRA	Giovane Élber	44	21	24+3	15	0+1	0	0+0	0	11+5	6
19	FW	(Germany) GER	Carsten Jancker	44	17	16+9	12	2+0	1	1+1	2	9+6	2
21	FW	(Germany) GER	Alexander Zickler	35	7	9+15	3	2+0	1	1+0	3	2+6	0
26	FW	(Italy) ITA	Antonio Di Salvo	6	0	0+6	0	0+0	0	0+0	0	0+0	0
Players sold or loaned out after the start of the season:

=== Minutes played ===
No.	Player	Total	Bundesliga	DFB-Pokal	DFB-Ligaokal	Champions League
1	Oliver Kahn	4,627	2,790	210	180	1,447
20	Hasan Salihamidžić	4,004	2,419	146	112	1,327
25	Thomas Linke	3,700	2,291	0	90	1,319
7	Mehmet Scholl	3,520	2,107	85	112	1,216
2	Willy Sagnol	3,366	2,081	120	90	1,075
5	Patrik Andersson	3,163	1,843	120	134	1,066
9	Giovane Élber	3,145	2,056	52	0	1,037
4	Samuel Kuffour	3,145	1,861	90	90	1,104
17	Thorsten Fink	3,040	1,796	210	134	900
18	Michael Tarnat	2,823	1,694	210	168	751
10	Ciriaco Sforza	2,718	1,655	187	136	740
19	Carsten Jancker	2,665	1,474	210	134	847
16	Jens Jeremies	2,659	1,606	45	46	962
11	Stefan Effenberg	2,587	1,684	0	0	903
3	Bixente Lizarazu	2,064	1,165	90	0	809
13	Paulo Sérgio	1,958	1,460	120	0	378
24	Roque Santa Cruz	1,442	1,045	23	136	238
21	Alexander Zickler	1,355	837	135	90	293
23	Owen Hargreaves	918	666	23	12	217
6	Michael Wiesinger	915	294	154	136	331
8	Thomas Strunz	483	280	75	90	38
33	Stefan Wessels	203	90	0	0	113
26	Antonio Di Salvo	98	98	0	0	0
15	Sławomir Wojciechowski	95	0	5	90	0
22	Bernd Dreher	90	90	0	0	0
27	Berkant Göktan	8	8	0	0	0

=== Bookings ===
No.	Player	Bundesliga			DFB-Pokal			DFB-Ligapokal			Champions League			Total		
No.	Player	Yellow card	(yellow card) (red card)	Red card	Yellow card	(yellow card) (red card)	Red card	Yellow card	(yellow card) (red card)	Red card	Yellow card	(yellow card) (red card)	Red card	Yellow card	(yellow card) (red card)	Red card
20	Hasan Salihamidžić	10	0	0	0	0	0	0	0	0	5	0	0	15	0	0
16	Jens Jeremies	10	0	0	0	0	0	0	0	0	4	0	0	14	0	0
11	Stefan Effenberg	8	0	1	0	0	0	0	0	0	5	0	0	13	0	1
7	Mehmet Scholl	7	0	0	0	0	0	0	0	0	2	0	0	9	0	0
19	Carsten Jancker	8	0	0	0	0	0	0	0	0	1	0	0	9	0	0
25	Thomas Linke	6	0	0	0	0	0	0	0	0	2	0	0	8	0	0
3	Bixente Lizarazu	2	1	0	0	0	0	0	0	0	5	0	0	7	1	0
18	Michael Tarnat	6	0	0	0	0	0	1	0	0	0	0	0	7	0	0
2	Willy Sagnol	5	0	0	0	0	0	0	0	0	1	0	0	6	0	0
17	Thorsten Fink	4	0	0	0	0	0	0	0	0	2	0	0	6	0	0
4	Samuel Kuffour	5	0	0	0	0	0	0	0	0	0	0	1	5	0	1
1	Oliver Kahn	4	1	0	0	0	0	0	0	0	1	0	0	5	1	0
9	Giovane Élber	5	0	0	0	0	0	0	0	0	0	0	0	5	0	0
10	Ciriaco Sforza	2	0	0	0	0	0	0	0	0	2	0	0	4	0	0
13	Paulo Sérgio	3	0	0	0	0	0	0	0	0	1	0	0	4	0	0
23	Owen Hargreaves	1	0	0	0	0	0	1	0	0	0	0	0	2	0	0
5	Patrik Andersson	0	0	0	0	0	0	0	0	0	1	0	0	1	0	0
6	Michael Wiesinger	0	0	0	1	0	0	0	0	0	0	0	0	1	0	0
21	Alexander Zickler	1	0	0	0	0	0	0	0	0	0	0	0	1	0	0
24	Roque Santa Cruz	1	0	0	0	0	0	0	0	0	0	0	0	1	0	0
Totals		88	2	1	1	0	0	2	0	0	32	0	1	123	2	2

=== Suspensions ===
No.	Player	No. of matches served	Reason	Competition served in	Date served	Opponent(s)	Source
4	Samuel Kuffour	1	Red card vs. Helsingborgs IF	UCL	19 September	Rosenborg	
20	Hasan Salihamidžić	1	3rd yellow card	UCL	22 November	Lyon	
20	Hasan Salihamidžić	1	5th yellow card	Bundesliga	2 December	Bayer 04 Leverkusen	
19	Carsten Jancker	1	5th yellow card	Bundesliga	13 December	Hamburger SV	
18	Michael Tarnat	1	5th yellow card	Bundesliga	17 December	Hertha BSC	
11	Stefan Effenberg	1	5th yellow card	Bundesliga	17 February	SpVgg Unterhaching	
16	Jens Jeremies	1	3rd yellow card	UCL	21 February	Spartak Moscow	
3	Bixente Lizarazu	1	3rd yellow card	UCL	6 March	Lyon	
16	Jens Jeremies	1	5th yellow card	Bundesliga	10 March	Energie Cottbus	
1	Oliver Kahn	1	Red card vs. F.C. Hansa Rostock	Bundesliga	10 March	Energie Cottbus	
11	Stefan Effenberg	1	3rd yellow card	UCL	14 March	Arsenal	
7	Mehmet Scholl	1	5th yellow card	Bundesliga	31 March	Werder Bremen	
9	Giovane Élber	1	5th yellow card	Bundesliga	14 April	Schalke 04	
25	Thomas Linke	1	5th yellow card	Bundesliga	14 April	Schalke 04	
11	Stefan Effenberg	1	Red card vs. Borussia Dortmund	Bundesliga	14 April	FC Schalke 04	
11	Stefan Effenberg	1	Red card vs. Borussia Dortmund	Bundesliga	21 April	Eintracht Frankfurt	
3	Bixente Lizarazu	1	Red card vs. Borussia Dortmund	Bundesliga	14 April	Schalke 04	
2	Willy Sagnol	1	5th yellow card	Bundesliga	21 April	Eintracht Frankfurt	
11	Stefan Effenberg	1	5th yellow card	UCL	9 May	Real Madrid	
16	Jens Jeremies	1	10th yellow card	Bundesliga	12 May	1. FC Kaiserslautern	
20	Hasan Salihamidžić	1	10th yellow card	Bundesliga	19 May	Hamburger SV	

=== Transfers ===
==== In ====
First Team

No.	Pos.	Nat.	Name	Age	EU	Moving from	Type	Transfer window	Ends	Transfer fee	Source
2	DF	(France)	Willy Sagnol	23	EU	Monaco (France)	Transfer	Summer		€7.7 Million	
10	MF	(Switzerland)	Ciriaco Sforza	30	Non-EU	1. FC Kaiserslautern	Transfer	Summer		€2.3 Million	
30	MF	(France)	Alou Diarra	18	EU	Louhans-Cuiseaux (France)	Transfer	Summer		Free	
23	MF	(England) (Canada)	Owen Hargreaves	19	EU	Youth system	Promoted	Summer		N/A	
27	FW	(Turkey) (Germany)	Berkant Göktan	19	EU	Arminia Bielefeld	End of loan	Summer		N/A	
14	DF	(Germany)	Alexander Bugera	21	EU	MSV Duisburg	End of loan	Summer		N/A	

==== Out ====
No.	Pos.	Nat.	Name	Age	EU	Moving to	Type	Transfer window	Transfer fee	Source
8	MF	(Germany)	Thomas Strunz	32	EU		End of career	Summer	N/A	
14	DF	(Germany)	Alexander Bugera	21	EU	SpVgg Unterhaching	Loan	Summer	€75,000	
31	MF	(Czech Republic)	David Jarolím	21	Non-EU	1. FC Nürnberg	Transfer	Summer	€200,000	
12	GK	(Germany)	Sven Scheuer	29	EU	Adanaspor (Turkey)	Transfer	Summer	Free	
30	DF	(Sweden)	Nils-Eric Johansson	20	EU	1. FC Nürnberg	Transfer	Summer	Free	
2	DF	(Germany)	Markus Babbel	27	EU	Liverpool (England)	Transfer	Summer	Free	
23	DF	(Germany)	Frank Wiblishauser	22	EU	1. FC Nürnberg	Transfer	Summer	Free	
