= 2001–02 FC Bayern Munich season =

102nd season in existence of Bayern Munich

Bayern Munich
2001–02 season
- Chairman: Franz Beckenbauer
- Manager: Ottmar Hitzfeld
- Bundesliga: 3rd
- DFB-Pokal: Semi-finals
- UEFA Champions League: Quarter-finals
- UEFA Super Cup: Runners-up
- Intercontinental Cup: Winners
- Top goalscorer: League: Giovane Élber (17); All: Giovane Élber (24)
Home colours	Away colours	Third colours

During the 2001–02 season, Bayern Munich failed to defend either the league or Champions League titles won in the previous season, finishing third in Bundesliga and losing out to eventual champions Real Madrid in the quarter-final of the latter competition. Its reaction to the losses was signing Michael Ballack and Zé Roberto from Champions League finalists Bayer Leverkusen, as well as Sebastian Deisler form Hertha BSC, with the midfield being singled out as the key area in which the side needed to improve upon.

== Squad ==
Note: Flags indicate national team as defined under FIFA eligibility rules; some limited exceptions apply. Players may hold more than one non-FIFA nationality.

No.	Pos.	Nation	Player
1	GK	GER	Oliver Kahn
2	DF	FRA	Willy Sagnol
3	DF	FRA	Bixente Lizarazu
4	DF	GHA	Samuel Kuffour
6	MF	GUI	Pablo Thiam
7	MF	GER	Mehmet Scholl
8	MF	CRO	Niko Kovač
9	FW	BRA	Giovane Élber
10	MF	SUI	Ciriaco Sforza
11	MF	GER	Stefan Effenberg
12	DF	CRO	Robert Kovač
13	FW	BRA	Paulo Sérgio
14	FW	PER	Claudio Pizarro
16	MF	GER	Jens Jeremies
17	MF	GER	Thorsten Fink

No.	Pos.	Nation	Player
18	DF	GER	Michael Tarnat
19	FW	GER	Carsten Jancker
20	MF	BIH	Hasan Salihamidžić
21	FW	GER	Alexander Zickler
22	GK	GER	Bernd Dreher
23	MF	ENG	Owen Hargreaves
24	FW	PAR	Roque Santa Cruz
25	DF	GER	Thomas Linke
28	MF	GER	Patrick Mölzl
30	MF	FRA	Alou Diarra
31	DF	GER	Stephan Kling
32	MF	GER	Markus Feulner
33	GK	GER	Stefan Wessels
35	DF	GER	Steffen Hofmann
38	GK	GER	Jan Schlösser

== Results ==
=== Bundesliga ===
==== League results ====
Match	Date	Ground	Opponent	Score^{1}	Pos.	Pts.	GD	Report
1	28 July	A	Borussia Mönchengladbach	0 – 1	14	0	-1	Report / Report link; Kick off / 15:30 CEST; Attendance / 34,500 (sell-out); Referee / Edgar Steinborn; Borussia Mönchengladbach / Bayern Munich; Van Lent 23' / Effenberg (yellow card); Jancker (yellow card); N. Kovač (yellow card); Hargreaves (yellow card)
2	4 August	H	Schalke 04	3 – 0	5	3	2	Report / Report link; Kick off / 15:30 CEST; Attendance / 63,000 (sell-out); Referee / Herbert Fandel; Bayern Munich / Schalke 04; Pizarro 6'; Scholl 13'; N. Kovač 39'; Lizarazu (yellow card); Linke (yellow card) / Hajto (yellow card); Sand (yellow card); Asamoah (yellow card); Van Hoogdalem (yellow card)
3	11 August	A	Bayer Leverkusen	1 – 1	5	4	2	Report / Report link; Kick off / 15:30 CEST; Attendance / 22,500 (sell-out); Referee / Hellmut Krug; Bayer Leverkusen / Bayern Munich; Kirsten 69'; Ramelow (yellow card); Sebescen (yellow card); Vranješ (yellow card) / Élber 79' (yellow card); Pizarro (yellow card); R. Kovač (yellow card); Hargreaves (yellow card); Thiam (yellow card)
4	18 August	H	FC St. Pauli	2 – 0	5	7	4	Report / Report link; Kick off / 15:30 CEST; Attendance / 60,000; Referee / Jürgen Jansen; Bayern Munich / FC St. Pauli; Sforza 13'; Élber 45'; Linke (yellow card) / Bürger (yellow card); Inceman (yellow card)
5	8 September	A	Borussia Dortmund	2 – 0	4	10	6	Report / Report link; Kick off / 15:30 CEST; Attendance / 68,600 (sell-out); Referee / Lutz Michael Fröhlich; Borussia Dortmund / Bayern Munich; Wörns (yellow card) / Salihamidžić 22'; Santa Cruz 58'; Fink (yellow card); Kuffour (yellow card)
6	15 September	H	SC Freiburg	1 – 0	3	13	7	Report / Report link; Kick off / 15:30 CEST; Attendance / 46,000; Referee / Michael Weiner; Bayern Munich / SC Freiburg; Élber 89'; Fink (yellow card) / Kobiashvili (yellow card)
7	22 September	A	Energie Cottbus	3 – 0	2	16	10	Report / Report link; Kick off / 15:30 CEST; Attendance / 20,100; Referee / Jürgen Aust; Energie Cottbus / Bayern Munich; Hujdurović (yellow card) / Zickler 2'; Pizarro 3'; Piplica 74' (o.g.); N. Kovač (yellow card); Salihamidžić (yellow card); Tarnat (yellow card)
8	30 September	H	VfB Stuttgart	4 – 0	2	19	14	Report / Report link; Kick off / 17:30 CEST; Attendance / 61,000; Referee / Florian Meyer; Bayern Munich / VfB Stuttgart; Élber 9', 13', 59'; Paulo Sérgio 90' / Meißner (red card) 18'; Todt (yellow card); Hleb (yellow card)
9	13 October	A	1860 Munich	5 – 1	2	22	18	Report / Report link; Kick off / 15:30 CEST; Attendance / 69,000 (sell-out); Referee / Hellmut Krug; 1860 Munich / Bayern Munich; Bierofka 9'; Cerny (yellow card); Schroth (yellow card); Borimirov (yellow card); Greilich (yellow card) / Santa Cruz 28'; Fink 44'; Salihamidžić 57'; Élber 80'; Pizarro 86' (pen.)
10	20 October	H	1. FC Kaiserslautern	4 – 1	1	25	21	Report / Report link; Kick off / 15:30 CEST; Attendance / 63,000 (sell-out); Referee / Jürgen Jansen; Bayern Munich / 1. FC Kaiserslautern; Santa Cruz 16'; Salihamidžić 23', 29' (pen.); Pizarro 90+1' / Koch 82' (pen.); Grammozis (yellow card)
11	27 October	A	1. FC Köln	2 – 0	1	28	23	Report / Report link; Kick off / 15:30 CEST; Attendance / 42,000 (sell-out); Referee / Lutz Michael Fröhlich; Bayern Munich / 1. FC Köln; Pizarro 27', 70'; Zickler (yellow card) / Keller (yellow card); Baranek (yellow card)
12	3 November	H	Hamburger SV	3 – 0	1	31	26	Report / Report link; Kick off / 15:30 CET; Attendance / 55,000; Referee / Alfons Berg; Bayern Munich / Hamburger SV; Paulo Sérgio 70'; Pizarro 84', 89'; Sforza (yellow card) / Präger (yellow card)
13	17 November	A	Werder Bremen	0 – 1	2	31	25	Report / Report link; Kick off / 15:30 CET; Attendance / 35,800 (sell-out); Referee / Herbert Fandel; Werder Bremen / Bayern Munich; Skrypnyk 40' (pen.); Verlaat (yellow card); Krstajić (yellow card); Stalteri (yellow card) / Effenberg (yellow card); Lizarazu (yellow card); Zickler (yellow card)
14	24 November	H	1. FC Nürnberg	0 – 0	2	32	25	Report / Report link; Kick off / 15:30 CET; Attendance / 63,000 (sell-out); Referee / Michael Weiner; Bayern Munich / 1. FC Nürnberg; Paulo Sérgio (yellow card); Linke (yellow card) / Nikl (yellow card); Wiblishauser (yellow card)
15	2 December	A	Hertha BSC	1 – 2	3	32	24	Report / Report link; Kick off / 17:30 CET; Attendance / 52,000 (sell-out); Referee / Jürgen Aust; Hertha BSC / Bayern Munich; Neuendorf 71'; Dárdai 84'; Šimunić (yellow card); Goor (yellow card); Van Burik (yellow card) / N. Kovač 46'; Kuffour (yellow card); Fink (yellow card)
16	8 December	H	VfL Wolfsburg	3 – 3	4	33	24	Report / Report link; Kick off / 15:30 CET; Attendance / 37,000; Referee / Torsten Koop; Bayern Munich / VfL Wolfsburg; Pizarro 11', 56'; Élber 17'; N. Kovač (yellow card); Lizarazu (yellow card) / Marić 44', 70'; Kühbauer 52' (yellow card); Franz (yellow card); Kryger (yellow card); Munteanu (yellow card)
17	15 December	A	Hansa Rostock	0 – 1	4	33	23	Report / Report link; Kick off / 15:30 CET; Attendance / 29,500 (sell-out); Referee / Edgar Steinborn; Hansa Rostock / Bayern Munich; Hirsch 86'; Lantz (yellow card); Yasser (yellow card) / R. Kovač (yellow card); Linke (yellow card); Jancker (yellow card); Effenberg (yellow card); Fink (yellow card)
18	18 December	H	Borussia Mönchengladbach	0 – 0	5	34	23	Report / Report link; Kick off / 20:00 CET; Attendance / 41,000; Referee / Knut Kircher; Bayern Munich / Borussia Mönchengladbach; N. Kovač (yellow card) / Hausweiler (yellow card); Münch (yellow card)
19	26 January	A	Schalke 04	1 – 5	5	34	19	Report / Report link; Kick off / 15:30 CET; Attendance / 60,683 (sell-out); Referee / Lutz Michael Fröhlich; Schalke 04 / Bayern Munich; Mpenza 34'; Sand 35'; Böhme 54'; Van Hoogdalem 75'; Oude Kamphuis 90+1'; Wilmots (yellow card) / Tarnat (red card) 41'; Scholl 49'; Effenberg (yellow card)
20	3 February	H	Bayer Leverkusen	2 – 0	4	37	21	Report / Report link; Kick off / 17:30 CET; Attendance / 43,000; Referee / Herbert Fandel; Bayern Munich / Bayer Leverkusen; Élber 67' (yellow card); Effenberg 71' (pen.); R. Kovač (yellow card); Hargreaves (yellow card) / Ballack (yellow card); Nowotny (yellow card)
21	6 February	A	FC St. Pauli	1 – 2	5	37	20	Report / Report link; Kick off / 20:00 CET; Attendance / 20,735 (sell-out); Referee / Hellmut Krug; FC St. Pauli / Bayern Munich; Meggle 30' (yellow card); Patschinski 33'; Berre (yellow card); Gibbs (yellow card); Meggle (yellow card) / Sagnol 87'; Hargreaves (yellow card); Fink (yellow card)
22	9 February	H	Borussia Dortmund	1 – 1	6	38	20	Report / Report link; Kick off / 15:30 CET; Attendance / 54,000; Referee / Edgar Steinborn; Bayern Munich / Borussia Dortmund; Élber 81'; Jancker (yellow card); Kahn (yellow card); Lizarazu (yellow card); Kuffour (yellow card); R. Kovač (yellow card) / Amoroso 78'; Reuter (yellow card); Evanilson (yellow card)
23	16 February	A	SC Freiburg	2 – 0	5	41	22	Report / Report link; Kick off / 15:30 CET; Attendance / 25,000 (sell-out); Referee / Markus Merk; SC Freiburg / Bayern Munich; / Lizarazu 32'; Élber 41'
24	23 February	H	Energie Cottbus	6 – 0	5	44	28	Report / Report link; Kick off / 15:30 CET; Attendance / 28,000; Referee / Florian Meyer; Bayern Munich / Energie Cottbus; Pizarro 15', 55'; Effenberg 35' (pen.); Scholl 45+1', 48'; Élber 74'; Fink (yellow card) / Mátyus (red card) 44'; Reghecampf (red card) 58'; Hujdurović (yellow card); Topić (yellow card)
25	2 March	A	VfB Stuttgart	2 – 0	4	47	30	Report / Report link; Kick off / 15:30 CET; Attendance / 54,300 (sell-out); Referee / Jürgen Aust; VfB Stuttgart / Bayern Munich; Bordon (yellow card); Carnell (yellow card) / Santa Cruz 32'; Scholl 39'; Effenberg (yellow card); Lizarazu (yellow card); R. Kovač (yellow card)
26	9 March	H	1860 Munich	2 – 1	3	50	31	Report / Report link; Kick off / 15:30 CET; Attendance / 68,000 (sell-out); Referee / Alfons Berg; Bayern Munich / 1860 Munich; Paulo Sérgio 72'; Fink 90'; Élber (yellow card) / Stranzl 75' (yellow card); Kurz (yellow card); Achim Pfuderer (yellow card)
27	16 March	A	1. FC Kaiserslautern	0 – 0	3	51	31	Report / Report link; Kick off / 15:30 CET; Attendance / 40,600 (sell-out); Referee / Torsten Koop; 1. FC Kaiserslautern / Bayern Munich; Grammozis (yellow card) 77' (red card); Lokvenc (yellow card); Ratinho (yellow card) / Linke (yellow card); Pizarro (yellow card); Élber (yellow card)
28	23 March	H	1. FC Köln	3 – 0	3	54	34	Report / Report link; Kick off / 15:30 CET; Attendance / 44,000; Referee / Peter Gagelmann; Bayern Munich / 1. FC Köln; Élber 64', 88'; Salihamidžić 83' (pen.) / Cullmann (yellow card); Sichone (yellow card)
29	30 March	A	Hamburger SV	0 – 0	3	55	34	Report / Report link; Kick off / 15:30 CET; Attendance / 55,360 (sell-out); Referee / Herbert Fandel; Hamburger SV / Bayern Munich; Romeo (yellow card); Barbarez (yellow card); Hoogma (yellow card); Hollerbach (yellow card) / Lizarazu (yellow card); Hargreaves (yellow card); Salihamidžić (yellow card); Linke (yellow card)
30	6 April	H	Werder Bremen	2 – 2	4	56	34	Report / Report link; Kick off / 15:30 CEST; Attendance / 52,000; Referee / Jürgen Aust; Bayern Munich / Werder Bremen; Pizarro 21'; Santa Cruz 55'; Fink (yellow card); Sagnol (yellow card) / Ailton 24' (pen.); Krstajić 90+1'; Lisztes (yellow card); Klasnić (yellow card)
31	13 April	A	1. FC Nürnberg	2 – 1	3	59	35	Report / Report link; Kick off / 15:30 CEST; Attendance / 44,696 (sell-out); Referee / Hellmut Krug; 1. FC Nürnberg / Bayern Munich; Krzynówek 73' (pen.); Kos (yellow card) 74' (red card); Wolf (yellow card) / Élber 11'; Pizarro 41'; Hargreaves (yellow card); Kahn (yellow card); R. Kovač (yellow card)
32	20 April	H	Hertha BSC	3 – 0	3	62	38	Report / Report link; Kick off / 15:30 CEST; Attendance / 63,000 (sell-out); Referee / Uwe Kemmling; Bayern Munich / Hertha BSC; Hartmann 67' (o.g.); Élber 82'; Pizarro 83'; Sagnol (yellow card); Fink (yellow card) / Van Burik (red card) 34'; Tretschok (yellow card); Beinlich (yellow card); Hartmann (yellow card)
33	27 April	A	VfL Wolfsburg	1 – 0	3	65	39	Report / Report link; Kick off / 15:30 CEST; Attendance / 20,400 (sell-out); Referee / Alfons Berg; VfL Wolfsburg / Bayern Munich; Sarpei (yellow card) / Biliškov 33' (o.g.); Pizarro (yellow card); Jeremies (yellow card); Lizarazu (yellow card)
34	4 May	H	Hansa Rostock	3 – 2	3	68	40	Report / Report link; Kick off / 15:30 CEST; Attendance / 63,000 (sell-out); Referee / Jürgen Jansen; Bayern Munich / Hansa Rostock; Baumgart 39' (o.g.); Scholl 55'; Élber 83' / Hansen 82'; Lantz 89'; Hirsch (yellow card); Emara (yellow card)

^{1}Bayern Munich goals come first.
Ground's country's flag and opponent's country's flag shown when from a different country of Bayern Munich.
Pos. = Position in league, Pts. = Points, GD = Goal difference, Ground: H = Home, A = Away, N = Neutral, HR = Home replacement, AR = Away replacement.

=== DFB-Pokal ===
27 August 1st Round	SC Paderborn	1–5	Bayern Munich	Bielefeld
20:30 CEST	Karpowicz 89' (yellow card); N'Tsika Compaigne (yellow card)	Report	Jancker 6' (yellow card); Santa Cruz 23'; Zickler 51', 71'; N. Kovač 65'; Sforza (yellow card); Tarnat (yellow card)	Stadium: Bielefelder Alm; Attendance: 24,000; Referee: Jürgen Aust

12 December 2nd Round	VfL Osnabrück	0–2	Bayern Munich	Osnabrück
20:30 CET	Thioune (yellow card); Enochs (yellow card); Schütte (yellow card); Sidney (yellow card)	Report	Jancker 49'; Scholl 62'; R. Kovač (yellow card) 74' (red card); Fink (yellow card); Effenberg (yellow card); Paulo Sérgio (yellow card)	Stadium: osnatel ARENA; Attendance: 17,500; Referee: Lutz Wagner

23 January Round of 16	Bayern Munich	2–1	VfL Wolfsburg	Munich
20:15 CET	Tarnat 43'; Élber 44' (yellow card); Jeremies (yellow card); N. Kovač (yellow card)		Ponte 13' (yellow card); Franz (yellow card); Kühbauer (yellow card)	Stadium: Olympiastadion; Attendance: 4,000; Referee: Alfons Berg

30 January Quarterfinals	1. FC Kaiserslautern	0–0 (a.e.t.) (3–5 p)	Bayern Munich	Kaiserslautern
20:30 CET	Lincoln (yellow card); Strasser (yellow card); Lokvenc (yellow card); Knavs (yellow card)		Kuffour (yellow card); Jancker (yellow card); Hargreaves (yellow card); Effenberg (yellow card); Élber (yellow card)	Stadium: Fritz-Walter-Stadion; Attendance: 37,632; Referee: Jürgen Jansen
	Penalties
	Koch (penalty scored); Hengen (penalty scored); Bjelica (penalty missed); Hristov (penalty scored)		Effenberg (penalty scored); Jeremies (penalty scored); Hargreaves (penalty scored); Scholl (penalty scored); Pizarro (penalty scored)

6 March Semifinals	Schalke 04	2–0 (a.e.t.)	Bayern Munich	Gelsenkirchen
20:30 CET	Van Hoogdalem 100' (yellow card); Böhme 115' (yellow card); Němec (yellow card); Sand (yellow card); Đorđević (yellow card)		Kuffour (red card) 90'; Jeremies (yellow card); Élber (yellow card); Effenberg (yellow card)	Stadium: Arena AufSchalke; Attendance: 60,683; Referee: Herbert Fandel

=== Champions League ===
==== Group stage results ====
===== 1st Group Stage =====
Pos	Team	Pld	W	D	L	GF	GA	GD	Pts	Qualification	BAY	SPP	FEY	SPM
1	(Germany) Bayern Munich	6	4	2	0	14	5	+9	14	Advance to second group stage	—	0–0	3–1	5–1
2	(Czech Republic) Sparta Prague	6	3	2	1	10	3	+7	11	Advance to second group stage	0–1	—	4–0	2–0
3	(Netherlands) Feyenoord	6	1	2	3	7	14	−7	5	Transfer to UEFA Cup	2–2	0–2	—	2–1
4	(Russia) Spartak Moscow	6	0	2	4	7	16	−9	2		1–3	2–2	2–2	—

Source: RSSSF

18 September 1	Bayern Munich	0–0	(Czech Republic) Sparta Prague	Munich, Germany
20:45 CEST				Stadium: Olympiastadion; Attendance: 20,000; Referee: Leslie Irvine (Northern Ireland)

25 September 2	Spartak Moscow (Russia)	1–3	Bayern Munich	Moscow, Russia
18:00 CEST	Baranov (yellow card) 9' (goal) 64'; Kovtun (yellow card) 42'; Ananko (yellow card) 70'		Salihamidžić 16'; Élber 41', 74'; N. Kovač (yellow card) 85'	Stadium: Luzhniki Stadium; Attendance: 30,000; Referee: Arturo Dauden Ibañez (Spain)

10 October 3	Feyenoord (Netherlands)	2–2	Bayern Munich	Rotterdam, Netherlands
20:45 CEST	Collen (yellow card) 24'; Van Hooijdonk 38'; Emerton (yellow card) 44'; Tomasson 45+1'; Bosvelt (yellow card) 74'		Élber 13', 50'; Salihamidžić (yellow card) 90+3'	Stadium: De Kuip; Attendance: 45,000; Referee: Gilles Veissière (France)

17 October 4	Bayern Munich	5–1	(Russia) Spartak Moscow	Munich, Germany
20:45 CEST	Pizarro 7', 22'; Élber 33', 52'; Zickler 90+1'		Beschastnykh 58'	Stadium: Olympiastadion; Attendance: 25,000; Referee: Frank De Bleeckere (Belgium)

23 October 5	Bayern Munich	3–1	(Netherlands) Feyenoord	Munich, Germany
20:45 CEST	Van Gobbel 12' (o.g.); Santa Cruz 30', 90+1'		Elmander 25'	Stadium: Olympiastadion; Attendance: 40,000; Referee: Lucílio Batista (Portugal)

31 October 6	Sparta Prague (Czech Republic)	0–1	Bayern Munich	Prague, Czech Republic
20:45 CET	Babnič (yellow card) 30'		Novotný 40' (o.g.); Pizarro (yellow card) 70'	Stadium: Letná Stadium; Attendance: 19,369; Referee: Alain Hamer (Luxembourg)

===== 2nd Group Stage =====
Pos	Team	Pld	W	D	L	GF	GA	GD	Pts	Qualification	MUN	BAY	BOA	NAN
1	(England) Manchester United	6	3	3	0	13	3	+10	12	Advance to knockout stage	—	0–0	3–0	5–1
2	(Germany) Bayern Munich	6	3	3	0	5	2	+3	12	Advance to knockout stage	1–1	—	1–0	2–1
3	(Portugal) Boavista	6	1	2	3	2	8	−6	5		0–3	0–0	—	1–0
4	(France) Nantes	6	0	2	4	4	11	−7	2		1–1	0–1	1–1	—

Source: RSSSF

20 November 1	Bayern Munich	1–1	(England) Manchester United	Munich, Germany
20:45 CET	Paulo Sérgio 87', (yellow card) 90+1'		Brown (yellow card) 14'; Blanc (yellow card) 45'; Van Nistelrooy 74'	Stadium: Olympiastadion; Attendance: 59,000; Referee: Anders Frisk (Sweden)

5 December 2	Nantes (France)	0–1	Bayern Munich	Nantes, France
20:45 CET	Moldovan (yellow card) 80'		Paulo Sérgio 65', (yellow card) 87'; N. Kovač (yellow card) 87'; R. Kovač (yellow card) 82'	Stadium: Stade de la Beaujoire; Attendance: 30,000; Referee: Pierluigi Collina (Italy)

20 February 3	Boavista (Portugal)	0–0	Bayern Munich	Porto, Portugal
20:45 CET	Ávalos (yellow card) 71'; Turra (yellow card) 81'		Effenberg (yellow card) 52'; Jeremies (yellow card) 67'	Stadium: Estádio do Bessa; Attendance: 13,000; Referee: Ľuboš Micheľ (Slovakia)

26 February 4	Bayern Munich	1–0	(Portugal) Boavista	Munich, Germany
20:45 CET	Hargreaves (yellow card) 16'; R. Kovač (yellow card) 37'; Santa Cruz 81'		Silva (yellow card) 19'; Ávalos (yellow card) 32'; Bosingwa (yellow card) 49'	Stadium: Olympiastadion; Attendance: 32,000; Referee: Terje Hauge (Norway)

13 March 5	Manchester United (England)	0–0	Bayern Munich	Manchester, England
20:45 CET	Blanc (yellow card) 37'; Van Nistelrooy (yellow card) 43'			Stadium: Old Trafford; Attendance: 68,217; Referee: Gilles Veissière (France)

19 March 6	Bayern Munich	2–1	(France) Nantes	Munich, Germany
20:45 CET	Jeremies 58'; Pizarro 87'		Ahamada 54'; Armand (yellow card) 59'; Toulalan (yellow card) 77'	Stadium: Olympiastadion; Attendance: 32,000; Referee: Knud Erik Fisker (Denmark)

==== Knockout stage ====
===== Quarter-finals =====
2 April 1st leg	Bayern Munich	2–1	(Spain) Real Madrid	Munich, Germany
20:45 CEST	Sagnol (yellow card) 55'; Effenberg 82'; Pizarro 88'; Élber (yellow card) 89'; N. Kovač (yellow card) 89'		Geremi 11'; Helguera (yellow card) 52'	Stadium: Olympiastadion; Attendance: 60,000; Referee: Hugh Dallas (Scotland)

10 April 2nd leg	Real Madrid (Spain)	2–0 (3–2 agg.)	Bayern Munich	Madrid, Spain
20:45 CEST	Hierro (yellow card) 65'; Helguera 69'; Figo (yellow card) 70'; Solari (yellow card) 82'; Guti 85'		Effenberg (yellow card) 23'; Jeremies (yellow card) 83'; Salihamidžić (red card) 90+4'	Stadium: Santiago Bernabéu Stadium; Attendance: 75,328; Referee: Stefano Braschi (Italy)

=== DFB-Ligapokal ===
18 July Semifinals	Bayern Munich	0–1	Hertha BSC	Augsburg
20:30 CEST	Thiam (yellow card)		Preetz 39'; Király (yellow card); Šimunić (yellow card); Schmidt (yellow card)	Stadium: Rosenaustadion; Attendance: 15,500; Referee: Jürgen Jansen

=== Intercontinental Cup ===
27 November Final	Bayern Munich	1–0 (a.e.t.)	(Argentina) Boca Juniors	Tokyo, Japan
19:20 JST	Kuffour (yellow card) 29', (goal) 109'; Hargreaves (yellow card) 72'; Élber (yellow card) 105+1'		Serna (yellow card) 6'; Delgado (yellow card) 45+1' (red card); Rodríguez (yellow card) 70'; Schelotto (yellow card) 83'; Córdoba (yellow card) 102'; Schiavi (yellow card) 111'	Stadium: National Stadium; Attendance: 51,360; Referee: Kim Milton Nielsen (Denmark)

=== UEFA Super Cup ===
24 August Final	Bayern Munich	2–3	(England) Liverpool	Monaco
20:45 CEST	Salihamidžić 57'; Jancker 82'		Hamann (yellow card) 14'; Riise 23'; Heskey 45'; Owen 46'	Stadium: Stade Louis II; Attendance: 13,824; Referee: Vítor Melo Pereira (Portugal)

== Team statistics ==
Competition	First match	Last match	Starting round	Final position	Record							
Competition	First match	Last match	Starting round	Final position	G	W	D	L	GF	GA	GD	Win %
Bundesliga	28 July	4 May	Matchday 1	3rd	34	20	8	6	65	25	+40	58.82
DFB-Pokal	27 August	6 March	First round	Semifinals	5	3	1	1	9	4	+5	60.00
DFB-Ligapokal	18 July	18 July	Semifinals	Semifinals	1	0	0	1	0	1	−1	0.00
Champions League	18 September	10 April	Group stage	Quarterfinals	14	8	5	1	21	10	+11	57.14
Intercontinental Cup	27 November		Final	Winners	1	1	0	0	1	0	+1	100.00
UEFA Super Cup	24 August		Final	Runners-up	1	0	0	1	2	3	−1	0.00
Total					56	32	14	10	98	43	+55	57.14

== Squad statistics ==
=== Squad, appearances and goals ===
No.	Nat	Player	Total		Bundesliga		DFB-Pokal		Ligapokal		Champions League		UEFA Super Cup		Intercontinental Cup	
No.	Nat	Player	App	Gls	App	Gls	App	Gls	App	Gls	App	Gls	App	Gls	App	Gls
Goalkeepers
1	(Germany)	Oliver Kahn (VC)	51 (0)	0	32 (0)	0	4 (0)	0	1 (0)	0	12 (0)	0	1 (0)	0	1 (0)	0
22	(Germany)	Bernd Dreher	0 (0)	0	0 (0)	0	0 (0)	0	0 (0)	0	0 (0)	0	0 (0)	0	0 (0)	0
33	(Germany)	Stefan Wessels	5 (0)	0	2 (0)	0	1 (0)	0	0 (0)	0	2 (0)	0	0 (0)	0	0 (0)	0
38	(Germany)	Jan Schlösser	0 (0)	0	0 (0)	0	0 (0)	0	0 (0)	0	0 (0)	0	0 (0)	0	0 (0)	0
Defenders
2	(France)	Willy Sagnol	40 (1)	0	27 (1)	1	1 (0)	0	0 (0)	0	10 (0)	0	1 (0)	0	1 (0)	0
3	(France)	Bixente Lizarazu	39 (0)	1	24 (1)	1	1 (0)	0	0 (0)	0	12 (0)	0	1 (0)	0	1 (0)	0
4	(Ghana)	Samuel Kuffour	40 (0)	1	21 (0)	0	3 (0)	0	1 (0)	0	14 (0)	0	0 (0)	0	1 (0)	1
10	(Switzerland)	Ciriaco Sforza	11 (13)	1	7 (9)	1	1 (0)	0	0 (0)	0	2 (3)	0	1 (0)	0	0 (1)	0
12	(Croatia)	Robert Kovač	46 (1)	0	28 (1)	0	3 (0)	0	0 (0)	0	13 (0)	0	1 (0)	0	1 (0)	0
25	(Germany)	Thomas Linke	31 (2)	0	19 (1)	0	5 (0)	0	1 (0)	0	4 (1)	0	1 (0)	0	0 (0)	0
31	(Germany)	Stephan Kling	0 (0)	0	0 (0)	0	0 (0)	0	(0)	0	0 (0)	0	0 (0)	0	0 (0)	0
Midfielders
6	(Guinea)	Pablo Thiam	18 (4)	0	10 (2)	0	3 (0)	0	1 (0)	0	3 (1)	0	1 (0)	0	0 (1)	0
7	(Germany)	Mehmet Scholl	16 (7)	7	13 (5)	6	1 (2)	1	0 (0)	0	2 (0)	0	0 (0)	0	0 (0)	0
8	(Croatia)	Niko Kovač	18 (8)	3	10 (6)	2	3 (0)	1	1 (0)	0	3 (1)	0	0 (1)	0	1 (0)	0
11	(Germany)	Stefan Effenberg (C)	29 (0)	3	17 (0)	2	4 (0)	0	1 (0)	0	7 (0)	1	0 (0)	0	0 (0)	0
16	(Germany)	Jens Jeremies	13 (7)	1	5 (5)	0	2 (2)	0	0 (0)	0	6 (0)	1	0 (0)	0	0 (0)	0
17	(Germany)	Thorsten Fink	37 (8)	2	25 (3)	2	3 (1)	0	0 (0)	0	8 (4)	0	0 (0)	0	1 (0)	0
18	(Germany)	Michael Tarnat	14 (3)	1	8 (2)	0	3 (0)	1	1 (0)	0	2 (1)	0	0 (0)	0	0 (0)	0
20	(Bosnia and Herzegovina)	Hasan Salihamidžić	26 (5)	7	16 (3)	5	1 (0)	0	1 (0)	0	7 (2)	1	1 (0)	1	0 (0)	0
23	(England)	Owen Hargreaves	38 (11)	0	24 (5)	0	2 (2)	0	0 (1)	0	10 (3)	0	1 (0)	0	1 (0)	0
28	(Germany)	Patrick Mölzl	0 (0)	0	0 (0)	0	0 (0)	0	0 (0)	0	0 (0)	0	0 (0)	0	0 (0)	0
30	(France)	Alou Diarra	0 (0)	0	0 (0)	0	0 (0)	0	0 (0)	0	0 (0)	0	0 (0)	0	0 (0)	0
32	(Germany)	Markus Feulner	1 (3)	0	0 (1)	0	0 (1)	0	0 (0)	0	1 (2)	0	0 (0)	0	0 (0)	0
34	(Germany)	Florian Heller	0 (0)	0	0 (0)	0	0 (0)	0	0 (0)	0	0 (0)	0	0 (0)	0	0 (0)	0
35	(Germany)	Steffen Hofmann	0 (1)	0	0 (1)	0	0 (0)	0	0 (0)	0	0 (0)	0	0 (0)	0	0 (0)	0
Forwards
9	(Brazil)	Giovane Élber	41 (6)	24	27 (3)	17	2 (1)	1	1 (0)	0	9 (2)	6	1 (0)	0	1 (0)	0
13	(Brazil)	Paulo Sérgio	24 (15)	5	13 (10)	3	2 (0)	0	0 (1)	0	8 (4)	2	0 (0)	0	1 (0)	0
14	(Peru)	Claudio Pizarro	29 (21)	19	18 (12)	15	1 (3)	0	0 (0)	0	8 (6)	4	1 (0)	0	1 (0)	0
19	(Germany)	Carsten Jancker	14 (14)	2	8 (10)	0	4 (0)	2	0 (0)	0	2 (2)	0	0 (1)	1	0 (1)	0
21	(Germany)	Alexander Zickler	9 (15)	4	5 (8)	1	3 (1)	2	1 (0)	0	1 (6)	1	0 (0)	0	0 (0)	0
24	(Paraguay)	Roque Santa Cruz	26 (12)	9	15 (7)	5	2 (1)	1	1 (0)	0	8 (3)	3	0 (1)	0	0 (0)	0
26	(Italy)	Antonio Di Salvo	0 (1)	0	0 (0)	0	0 (0)	0	0 (1)	0	0 (0)	0	0 (0)	0	0 (0)	0
Numbers in parentheses indicate substitute appearances

=== Minutes played ===
No.	Player	Total	Bundesliga	DFB-Pokal	DFB-Ligaokal	Champions League	UEFA Super Cup	Intercontinental Cup
1	Oliver Kahn	4,680	2,880	420	90	1,080	90	120
12	Robert Kovač	4,216	2,527	314	0	1,165	90	120
23	Owen Hargreaves	3,586	2,185	290	20	925	90	76
2	Willy Sagnol	3,549	2,376	90	0	873	90	120
3	Bixente Lizarazu	3,538	2,172	120	0	1,036	90	120
9	Giovane Élber	3,527	2,325	168	90	734	90	120
4	Samuel Kuffour	3,524	1,878	210	90	1,244	0	120
17	Thorsten Fink	3,292	2,081	351	0	740	0	120
14	Claudio Pizarro	2,999	1,800	212	0	803	66	118
25	Thomas Linke	2,858	1,703	510	90	365	90	0
11	Stefan Effenberg	2,490	1,417	420	90	563	0	0
24	Roque Santa Cruz	2,452	1,317	298	88	731	18	0
20	Hasan Salihamidžić	2,214	1,376	90	90	586	72	0
13	Paulo Sérgio	2,208	1,179	107	44	758	0	120
8	Niko Kovač	1,673	1,004	266	70	233	24	76
6	Pablo Thiam	1,620	968	240	90	233	90	2
7	Mehmet Scholl	1,405	1,110	137	0	158	0	0
19	Carsten Jancker	1,371	750	357	0	196	24	44
16	Jens Jeremies	1,178	474	223	0	481	0	0
18	Michael Tarnat	1,143	603	270	46	224	0	0
21	Alexander Zickler	1,049	560	227	90	172	0	0
10	Ciriaco Sforza	1,015	664	54	0	187	66	44
33	Stefan Wessels	450	180	90	0	180	0	0
32	Markus Feulner	138	25	10	0	103	0	0
26	Antonio Di Salvo	2	0	0	2	0	0	0
22	Bernd Dreher	0	0	0	0	0	0	0
30	Alou Diarra	0	0	0	0	0	0	0
34	Florian Heller	0	0	0	0	0	0	0
35	Steffen Hofmann	0	0	0	0	0	0	0
31	Stephan Kling	0	0	0	0	0	0	0
28	Patrick Mölzl	0	0	0	0	0	0	0
38	Jan Schlösser	0	0	0	0	0	0	0

=== Bookings ===
No.	Player	Bundesliga			DFB-Pokal			DFB-Ligapokal			Champions League			UEFA Super Cup			Intercontinental; Cup			Total		
No.	Player	Yellow card	(yellow card) (red card)	Red card	Yellow card	(yellow card) (red card)	Red card	Yellow card	(yellow card) (red card)	Red card	Yellow card	(yellow card) (red card)	Red card	Yellow card	(yellow card) (red card)	Red card	Yellow card	(yellow card) (red card)	Red card	Yellow card	(yellow card) (red card)	Red card
13	Paulo Sérgio	1	0	0	1	0	0	0	0	0	2	0	0	0	0	0	0	0	0	0	0	0
11	Stefan Effenberg	5	0	0	3	0	0	0	0	0	2	0	0	0	0	0	0	0	0	0	0	0
9	Giovane Élber	4	0	0	2	0	0	0	0	0	0	0	0	0	0	0	1	0	0	0	0	0
17	Thorsten Fink	8	0	0	1	0	0	0	0	0	0	0	0	0	0	0	0	0	0	0	0	0
23	Owen Hargreaves	6	0	0	1	0	0	0	0	0	1	0	0	0	0	0	1	0	0	0	0	0
19	Carsten Jancker	3	0	0	2	0	0	0	0	0	0	0	0	0	0	0	0	0	0	0	0	0
16	Jens Jeremies	1	0	0	2	0	0	0	0	0	2	0	0	0	0	0	0	0	0	0	0	0
1	Oliver Kahn	2	0	0	0	0	0	0	0	0	0	0	0	0	0	0	0	0	0	0	0	0
8	Niko Kovač	4	0	0	1	0	0	0	0	0	3	0	0	0	0	0	0	0	0	0	0	0
12	Robert Kovač	6	0	0	0	1	0	0	0	0	2	0	0	0	0	0	0	0	0	0	0	0
4	Samuel Kuffour	2	0	0	1	0	1	0	0	0	0	0	0	0	0	0	1	0	0	0	0	0
25	Thomas Linke	6	0	0	1	0	0	0	0	0	0	0	0	0	0	0	0	0	0	0	0	0
3	Bixente Lizarazu	8	0	0	0	0	0	0	0	0	0	0	0	0	0	0	0	0	0	0	0	0
14	Claudio Pizarro	3	0	0	0	0	0	0	0	0	1	0	0	0	0	0	0	0	0	0	0	0
2	Willy Sagnol	2	0	0	0	0	0	0	0	0	1	0	0	0	0	0	0	0	0	0	0	0
20	Hasan Salihamidžić	2	0	0	0	0	0	0	0	0	1	0	1	0	0	0	0	0	0	0	0	0
10	Ciriaco Sforza	1	0	0	0	0	0	0	0	0	0	0	0	0	0	0	0	0	0	0	0	0
18	Michael Tarnat	1	0	1	1	0	0	0	0	0	0	0	0	0	0	0	0	0	0	0	0	0
6	Pablo Thiam	1	0	0	0	0	0	1	0	0	0	0	0	0	0	0	0	0	0	0	0	0
21	Alexander Zickler	2	0	0	0	0	0	0	0	0	0	0	0	0	0	0	0	0	0	0	0	0
Totals		68	0	1	16	1	1	1	0	0	16	0	1	0	0	0	3	0	0	0	0	0

=== Suspensions ===
No.	Player	No. of matches served	Reason	Competition served in	Date served	Opponent(s)	Source
14	Claudio Pizarro	1	Red card vs. Hansa Rostock in 2000–01 season with Werder Bremen	Bundesliga	28 July	Borussia Mönchengladbach	
12	Robert Kovač	1	Red card vs. VfL Osnabrück	DFB-Pokal	23 January	VfL Wolfsburg	
18	Michael Tarnat	1	Red card vs. Schalke 04 in Bundesliga	DFB-Pokal	30 January	1. FC Kaiserslautern	
17	Thorsten Fink	1	5th yellow card	Bundesliga	9 February	Borussia Dortmund	
11	Stefan Effenberg	1	5th yellow card	Bundesliga	9 March	1860 München	
12	Robert Kovač	1	5th yellow card	Bundesliga	9 March	1860 München	
3	Bixente Lizarazu	1	5th yellow card	Bundesliga	9 March	1860 München	
4	Samuel Kuffour	6	Headbutting Jörg Böhme	Bundesliga	9 March	1860 München	
4	Samuel Kuffour	6	Headbutting Jörg Böhme	Bundesliga	16 March	1. FC Kaiserslautern	
4	Samuel Kuffour	6	Headbutting Jörg Böhme	Bundesliga	23 March	1. FC Köln	
4	Samuel Kuffour	6	Headbutting Jörg Böhme	Bundesliga	30 March	Hamburger SV	
4	Samuel Kuffour	6	Headbutting Jörg Böhme	Bundesliga	6 April	Werder Bremen	
4	Samuel Kuffour	6	Headbutting Jörg Böhme	Bundesliga	13 April	1. FC Nürnberg	
25	Thomas Linke	1	5th yellow card	Bundesliga	23 March	1. FC Köln	
23	Owen Hargreaves	1	5th yellow card	Bundesliga	6 April	Werder Bremen	
8	Niko Kovač	1	3rd yellow card	Champions League	10 April	Real Madrid	

=== Transfers ===
==== In ====
First Team

No.	Pos.	Nat.	Name	Age	EU	Moving from	Type	Transfer window	Ends	Transfer fee	Source
12	DF	(Croatia)	Robert Kovač	27	Non-EU	Bayer Leverkusen	Transfer	Summer		€8.25 Million	
14	FW	(Italy) (Peru)	Claudio Pizarro	22	EU	Werder Bremen	Transfer	Summer		€8.2 Million	
8	MF	(Croatia)	Niko Kovač	29	Non-EU	Hamburger SV	Transfer	Summer		€5.5 Million	
6	MF	(Guinea)	Pablo Thiam	27	EU	VfB Stuttgart	Transfer	Summer		Free	
32	MF	(Germany)	Markus Feulner	19	EU	Youth system	Promoted	Summer		N/A	

==== Out ====
No.	Pos.	Nat.	Name	Age	EU	Moving to	Type	Transfer window	Transfer fee	Source
5	DF	(Sweden)	Patrik Andersson	29	EU	Barcelona (Spain)	Transfer	Summer	€8 Million	
6	MF	(Germany)	Michael Wiesinger	28	EU	1860 Munich	Transfer	Summer	€750,000	
15	MF	(Poland)	Sławomir Wojciechowski	27	Non-EU	Aarau (Switzerland)	Transfer	Summer	€600,000	
27	FW	(Turkey) (Germany)	Berkant Göktan	20	EU	Galatasaray (Turkey)	Transfer	Summer	Free	
