= Thorsten Fink =

German football player and coach

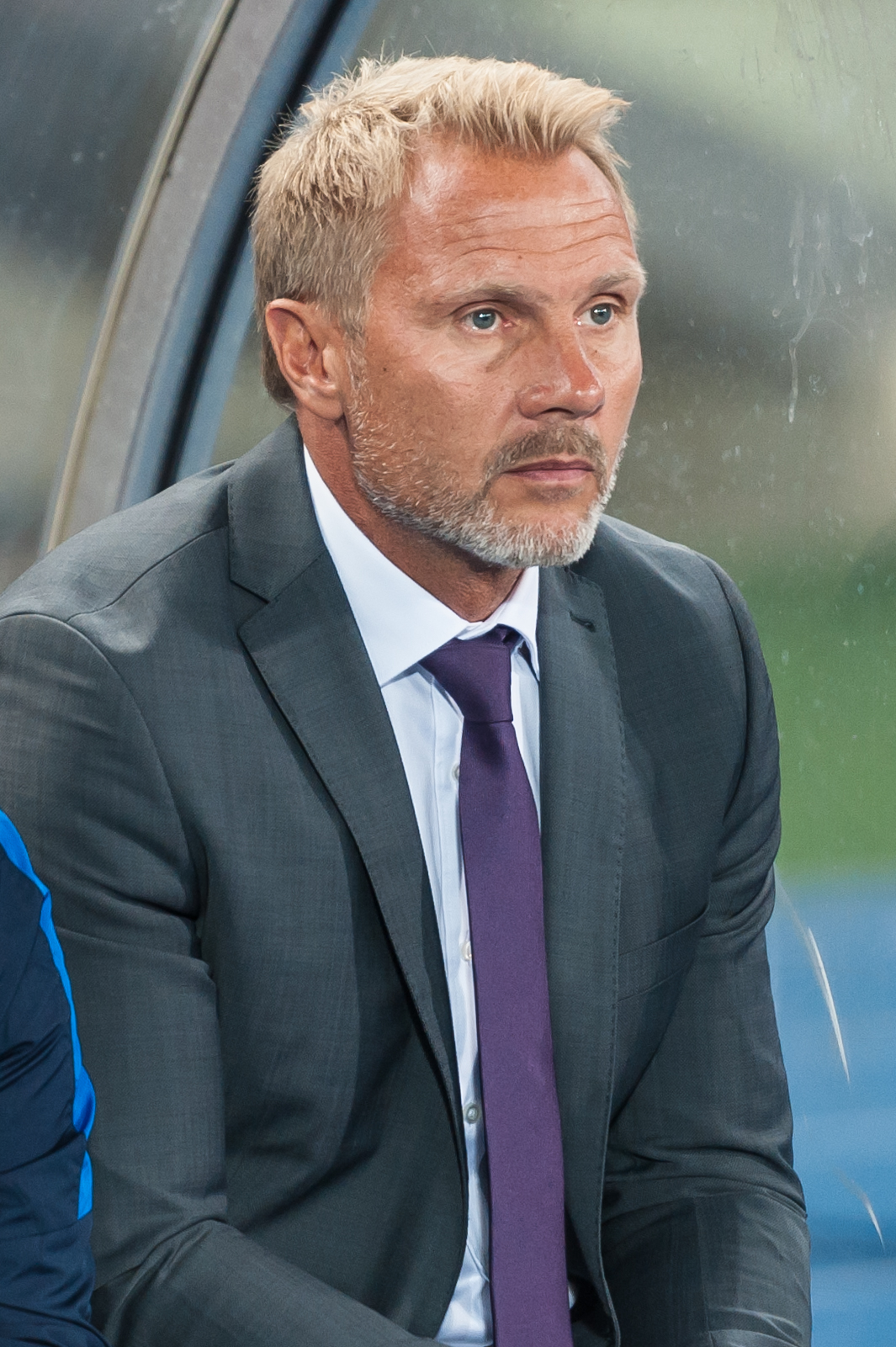
- Fink in 2016

Personal information
- Date of birth: 29 October 1967 (age 59)
- Place of birth: Dortmund, West Germany
- Height: 1.81 m (5 ft 11 1/2 in)
- Position: Defensive midfielder

Youth career
- 1976–1983: SV Roland Marten
- 1983–1986: Borussia Dortmund

Senior career*
Years	Team	Apps	(Gls)
1989–1994	Wattenscheid 09	162	(26)
1994–1997	Karlsruher SC	92	(11)
1997–2003	Bayern Munich	150	(4)
2003–2006	Bayern Munich II	86	(6)
Total		490	(47)

International career
1989	West Germany U21	1	(0)

Managerial career
- 2006–2007: Red Bull Salzburg (Junior)
- 2008–2009: FC Ingolstadt
- 2009–2011: Basel
- 2011–2013: Hamburger SV
- 2015: APOEL
- 2015–2018: Austria Wien
- 2018–2019: Grasshoppers
- 2019–2020: Vissel Kobe
- 2022: Riga
- 2022: Al Nasr
- 2023–2024: Sint-Truiden
- 2024–2025: Genk
- 2026: Samsunspor
- * Club domestic league appearances and goals

Thorsten Fink (born 29 October 1967) is a German professional football manager and former player who played as a defensive midfielder. As a player, he notably represented Bayern Munich between 1997 and 2003, winning multiple domestic honours and the UEFA Champions League.

After retiring in 2006, Fink moved into coaching and has managed clubs including FC Ingolstadt, Basel and Hamburg. With Basel, he won the Swiss Super League in 2009-10 and 2010-11 and the Swiss Cup in 2009-10.

He has also coached abroad, with spells at Austria Wien, APOEL, Vissel Kobe, Riga and Al Nasr, among others.

== Playing career ==
=== Wattenscheid and Karlsruher SC ===
Fink began his career with Borussia Dortmund's reserve squad before moving to Wattenscheid 09, where he helped them gain promotion to the first division of German football, the 1. Bundesliga, in 1990. After the club's relegation in 1994, he moved to Karlsruher SC, where he spent three seasons as a regular, earning a move to Bayern Munich, in 1997.

=== Bayern Munich ===
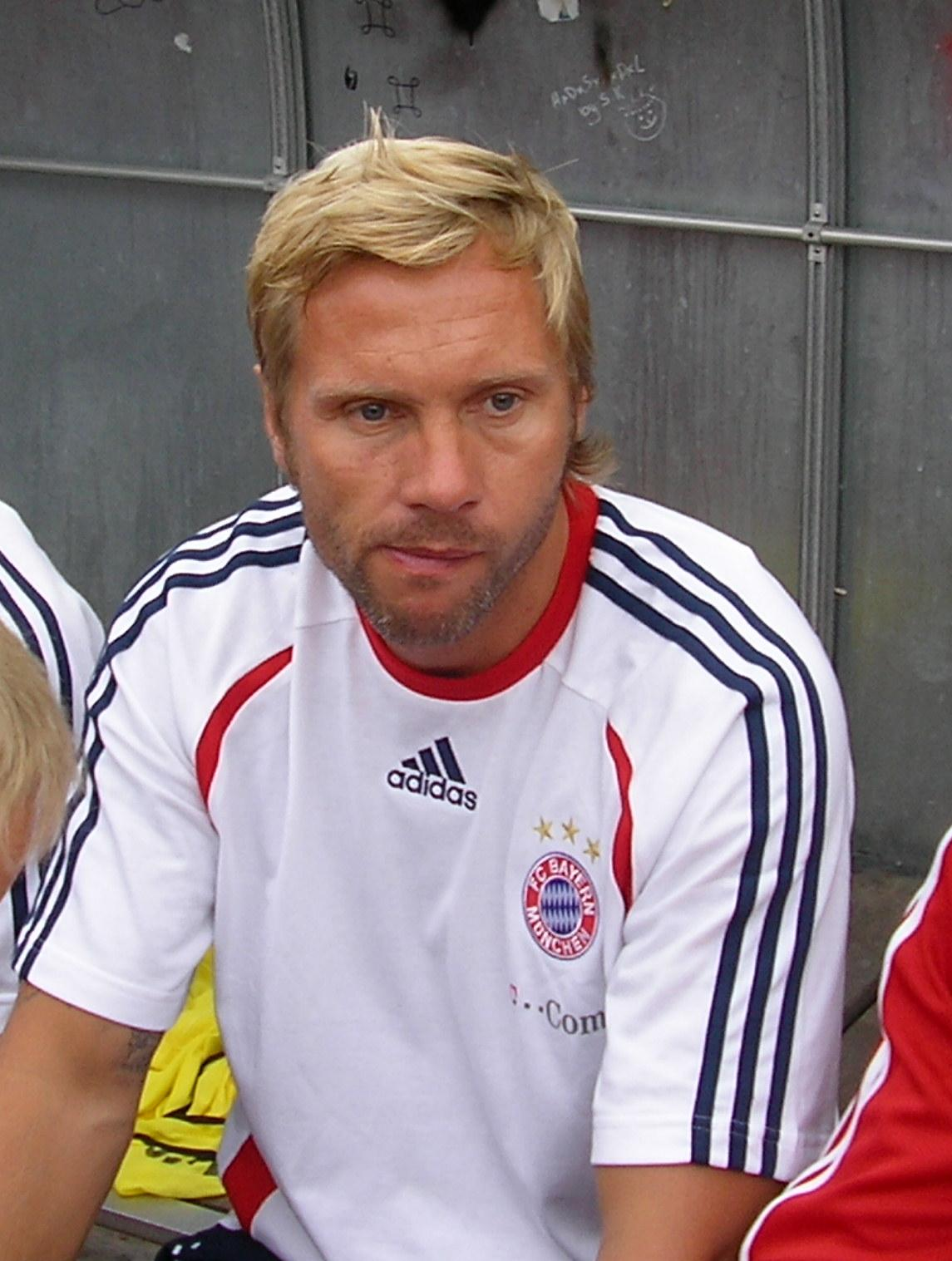
Fink with Bayern Munich

He subsequently spent seven seasons at Bayern, five of which as a regular, but lost his place in the starting lineup in 2002 and was transferred to the club's reserve squad in the German third division, the Regionalliga, in February 2003, although he managed a return to the Bundesliga squad in late April 2003. In the 2003–04 season, he became a regular in Bayern's reserve squad and only made one, his last, Bundesliga appearance that season, coming on as a substitute against VfL Wolfsburg in September 2003. His contract with Bayern's Bundesliga squad expired in June 2004 and he subsequently only continued to play another two seasons for the club's reserve squad before definitely ending his playing career upon the end of the 2005–06 season.

While playing for Bayern's first team, he helped the team reach the 1999 Champions League final against Manchester United, where Bayern dramatically lost 2–1, conceding two goals in injury time. Fink came on as a substitute late in the game, but his sliced clearance in the 91st minute led to United's equaliser, with the ball breaking to Ryan Giggs whose shot was turned into the net by Teddy Sheringham.

However, Fink still managed to pick up a Champions League winner's medal two years later, as Bayern beat Valencia in the 2001 Champions League final on penalties, although he did not play in the match. He also won four Bundesliga titles and was a three-time winner of the DFB-Pokal with the club.

He was forced to end his playing career in 2006 after sustaining cartilage damage in his knee.

== Coaching career ==
=== Early career ===
While still playing for Bayern, he had already graduated from Cologne Sport University, in December 2005, after taking a course on coaching. From 5 September 2006, he began coaching Red Bull Salzburg's reserve side. After the departure of Lothar Matthäus as the assistant of head coach Giovanni Trapattoni, Fink stepped up and became the new assistant.

Fink took over as head coach of FC Ingoldstadt on 4 January 2008, replacing Jürgen Press, who was sacked on New Year's Day. He appointed Heiko Vogel as his assistant. His first match was a 3–1 win against VfB Stuttgart II. Ingolstadt finished the 2007–08 season in second place. Ingolstadt started the 2008–09 season by losing to Hamburger SV in the first round of the German Cup. Fink was fired on 22 April 2009. He finished with a record of 16 wins, 11 draws, and 17 losses. His final match was a 3–2 loss against SC Freiburg. Ingolstadt were in 17th place when Fink was sacked.

=== Basel ===
On 9 June 2009, Fink was appointed manager of Basel as the replacement for Christian Gross. Fink took his assistant Vogel with him. His first match was a 2–0 loss to St. Gallen on 12 July 2009. In domestic affairs, Basel swept the board in the 2009/10 season. Despite a poor start to the season, Fink's side came back to win the 2010 Super League title on the last day of the season with an away win against favourites Young Boys at the Stade de Suisse. Young prospect Valentin Stocker and club legend Scott Chipperfield gave Basel the goals in the 2–0 victory on 16 May. Basel won the Swiss Cup Final 2010 with a 6–0 victory over Lausanne-Sport on 9 May. Basel started the 2010–11 season against Zürich on 20 July. With Fink Basel also won the 2011 Super League title and the 2011 Uhrencup. Fink left the club in October 2011. His final match was a 5–1 win against Schötz in the Swiss Cup.

Fwayo Tembo left Basel after he accused club coach Thorsten Fink of making racist remarks towards him during a training session. Fink is reported to have told a collaborator to "get the monkey down from the tree."

=== Hamburger SV ===
On 13 October 2011, Fink signed a contract with Hamburger SV to manage the German Bundesliga club through to 2014. with the team in the relegation zone after losing six of their opening eight matches. His first match was a 1–1 draw against VfL Wolfsburg. In HSV's first nine games under Fink they were unbeaten, going into the winter break in thirteenth place. The team eventually finished fifteenth, avoiding a first ever relegation by five points.

In the 2012–13 season, HSV recorded a much improved seventh-place finish. However, during the season Hamburg lost to Karlsruher SC in the first round of the German Cup. the team equaled the club's record Bundesliga defeat, losing 9–2 at the Allianz Arena to Bayern Munich.

Following a run of disastrous results, during which Hamburger SV picked up only four points from their first five league games of the 2013–14 Bundesliga season, and with the club in 15th place in the league table, Fink was sacked with immediate effect on 16 September 2013. "We were no longer confident that Thorsten Fink was capable of turning the team around and that was why we took this decision (to sack Fink). Also it is apparent that he had 'outside troubles' which could have contributed to his poor results. His final match was a 6–2 loss to Borussia Dortmund. He finished with a record of 23 wins, 18 draws and 27 losses in 68 matches.

=== APOEL ===
On 10 January 2015, Fink signed a contract until the end of the 2014–15 season, with the option of a further season with the reigning Cypriot champions APOEL, replacing Georgios Donis who was fired on 6 January 2015. His first match was a 2–1 loss to AEL Limassol. Following a run of disappointing performances and one day after a questionable 1–0 loss to Apollon Limassol, Fink was sacked by APOEL on 11 May 2015, although at that moment the team were two points clear at the top of the league with only two matches remaining.

=== Austria Wien ===
Fink was hired as Austria Wien's head coach on 28 May 2015. He was given a two-year contract plus an option and started in the 2015–16 season. He was also in negotiations with Hannover 96. He had his first training on 22 June 2015. On 17 July 2015, in his first match, Austria won 3–0 in the Austrian Cup. On 26 July 2015, in his first league match, Austria defeated Wolfsberg 2–0 away from home. On 23 April 2016, Austria Wien defeated SV Mattersburg 9–0. He finished the 2015–16 season in third place.

Austria Wien started the 2016–17 season with a 1–0 win against Kukësi in the Europa League on 14 July 2016.

After bad results and standing in seventh place Fink was dismissed on 25 February. His final match was a 2–1 loss to Admira Wacker Mödling on 24 February 2018.

=== Grasshoppers ===
Fink became manager of Grasshoppers on 23 April 2018. His first match was a 1–0 win against Lausanne-Sport on 28 April 2018. He started the 2018–19 season with a 2–0 loss against Young Boys.

After disastrous results of only one point out of his last eight matches in the Swiss Super League and standing in last place Fink was sacked on 4 March 2019. His last match was a 1–3 loss against Luzern on 2 March 2019.

=== Vissel Kobe ===
On 8 June 2019, Fink was appointed as the new manager of Vissel Kobe, replacing the outgoing Juan Manuel Lillo.

Fink managed to bring in the first two titles in club history of Vissel Kobe, winning the Emperors Cup and Japanese Super Cup in 2020.

On 22 September 2020, Fink decided to resign to return to his family.

=== Riga ===
In January 2022, Fink was appointed head coach of Riga. On 16 May 2022, Fink left Riga to take on a managerial job at another club.

=== Al-Nasr ===
In May 2022, Fink became head coach of the UAE Pro League club Al-Nasr. In November, he was dismissed as the club was third from bottom in the league table.

=== Sint-Truiden ===
In May 2023, Fink was appointed head coach of Belgian side Sint-Truiden, succeeding Bernd Hollerbach.

=== Genk ===
On 5 June 2024, Fink joined Genk in Belgium. He led Genk to the top position in the regular 2024–25 Belgian Pro League season, but the club finished in third place after the champions' play-offs. He was dismissed by Genk on 15 December 2025.

=== Samsunspor ===
On 16 February 2026, Fink became the head coach of Süper Lig club Samsunspor, succeeding Thomas Reis. He was sacked by the club on 12 October 2026 after a five game losing streak.

== Career statistics ==
=== Club ===
Club	Season	League			DFB-Pokal		DFL-Ligapokal		Europe		Other		Total	
Club	Season	Division	Apps	Goals	Apps	Goals	Apps	Goals	Apps	Goals	Apps	Goals	Apps	Goals
Borussia Dortmund	1987–88	Bundesliga	0	0	1	0	—		0	0	—		1	0
Wattenscheid	1989–90	2. Bundesliga	37	1	2	0	—		—		—		39	1
Wattenscheid	1990–91	Bundesliga	28	4	4	1	—		—		—		32	5
Wattenscheid	1991–92	Bundesliga	32	8	1	0	—		—		—		33	8
Wattenscheid	1992–93	Bundesliga	32	8	1	0	—		—		—		33	8
Wattenscheid	1993–94	Bundesliga	33	5	3	0	—		—		—		36	5
Wattenscheid	Total		162	26	11	1	—		—		—		173	27
Karlsruhe	1994–95	Bundesliga	31	5	4	2	—		—		—		35	7
Karlsruhe	1995–96	Bundesliga	29	1	6	1	—		—		—		35	2
Karlsruhe	1996–97	Bundesliga	32	5	5	1	—		5	2	—		42	8
Karlsruhe	Total		92	11	15	4	—		5	2	—		112	17
Bayern Munich	1997–98	Bundesliga	33	1	6	1	2	0	8 (Note: Appearances in UEFA Champions League)	0	—		49	2
Bayern Munich	1998–99	Bundesliga	28	0	4	1	2	0	10	1	—		44	2
Bayern Munich	1999–2000	Bundesliga	26	0	4	0	2	0	11	1	—		43	1
Bayern Munich	2000–01	Bundesliga	24	1	2	1	2	0	10	0	—		38	2
Bayern Munich	2001–02	Bundesliga	28	2	4	0	0	0	12	0	1 (Note: Appearance in Intercontinental Cup)	0	45	2
Bayern Munich	2002–03	Bundesliga	10	0	2	0	1	0	3	0	—		16	0
Bayern Munich	2003–04	Bundesliga	1	0	0	0	0	0	0	0	—		1	0
Bayern Munich	Total		150	4	22	3	9	0	54	2	1	0	236	9
Bayern Munich II	2002–03	Regionalliga Süd	6	0	—		—		—		—		6	0
Bayern Munich II	2003–04	Regionalliga Süd	27	4	—		—		—		—		27	4
Bayern Munich II	2004–05	Regionalliga Süd	34	1	4	0	—		—		—		38	1
Bayern Munich II	2005–06	Regionalliga Süd	19	1	—		—		—		—		19	1
Bayern Munich II	Total		86	6	4	0	—		—		—		90	6
Career total			490	47	53	8	9	0	59	4	1	0	612	59

=== Managerial ===
As of matches played on 10 October 2026

Team	From	To	Record					
Team	From	To	G	W	D	L	Win %	Ref.
Ingolstadt	4 January 2008	22 April 2009	44	16	11	17	36.36	
Basel	9 June 2009	17 October 2011	119	76	22	21	63.87	
Hamburg	17 October 2011	16 September 2013	68	23	18	27	33.82	
APOEL	10 January 2015	11 May 2015	22	11	8	3	50.00	
Austria Wien	4 June 2015	25 February 2018	123	60	21	42	48.78	
Grasshoppers	23 April 2018	4 March 2019	35	10	5	20	28.57	
Vissel Kobe	8 June 2019	22 September 2020	49	22	12	15	44.90	
Riga	4 January 2022	16 May 2022	13	8	1	4	61.54	
Al Nasr	19 May 2022	5 November 2022	12	2	5	5	16.67	
Sint-Truiden	16 May 2023	5 June 2024	42	13	15	14	30.95	
Genk	5 June 2024	15 December 2025	76	40	16	20	52.63	
Samsunspor	16 February 2026	12 October 2026	25	11	5	9	44.00	
Total			615	289	137	189	46.99	—

== Honours ==
=== Player ===
Bayern Munich

- Bundesliga: 1998–99, 1999–2000, 2000–01, 2002–03
- DFB-Pokal: 1997–98, 1999–2000, 2002–03
- DFL-Ligapokal: 1997, 1998, 1999, 2000
- UEFA Champions League: 2000–01
- Intercontinental Cup: 2001

=== Manager ===
Basel

- Swiss Super League: 2009–10, 2010–11
- Swiss Cup: 2009–10

Vissel Kobe

- Emperor's Cup: 2019
- Japanese Super Cup: 2020
