= Owen Hargreaves =

England footballer and TV pundit (born 1981)

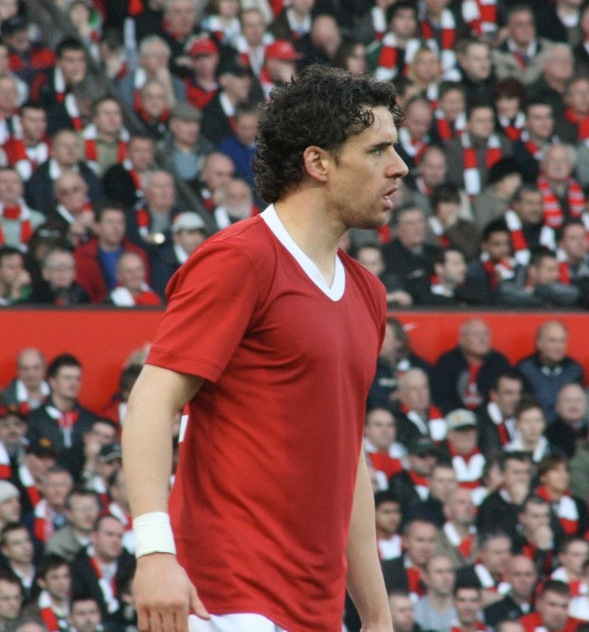
- Hargreaves playing for Manchester United in 2008

Personal information
- Full name: Owen Lee Hargreaves
- Date of birth: 20 January 1981 (age 45)
- Place of birth: Calgary, Alberta, Canada
- Height: 1.80 m (5 ft 11 in)
- Position: Midfielder

Youth career
- 1994–1997: Calgary Foothills
- 1997–1999: Bayern Munich

Senior career*
Years	Team	Apps	(Gls)
1999–2001	Bayern Munich II	26	(6)
2000–2007	Bayern Munich	145	(5)
2007–2011	Manchester United	27	(2)
2011–2012	Manchester City	1	(0)
Total		199	(13)

International career
1998	Wales U19	3	(0)
2000–2001	England U21	3	(0)
2001–2008	England	42	(0)
2006	England B	1	(0)
- * Club domestic league appearances and goals

Owen Lee Hargreaves (born 20 January 1981) is a former professional footballer who played as a midfielder. He played with Calgary Foothills as a youth before beginning his professional football career in Germany with Bayern Munich. After seven years with the Munich side – during which time he won four German league titles and the 2000–01 UEFA Champions League – Hargreaves signed for Manchester United in 2007, winning the Premier League and UEFA Champions League in his first season. However, his time at Manchester United was thereafter plagued with injuries and he was allowed to leave the club at the end of his contract in June 2011. Hargreaves posted YouTube videos in a bid to convince potential suitors of his fitness, and in August 2011, Manchester City offered Hargreaves a one-year contract, which he accepted, but he was released at the end of the season after just four appearances for the club.

As a Canadian citizen with a Welsh mother and an English father, Hargreaves was eligible to represent Canada, Wales or England, however later in his senior career chose England. Hargreaves initially played for Wales, and was capped three times for the Wales under-19 team, but then opted to play for the England under-21 team in 2000 and was capped by the senior squad the following year. He is the only player to have played for England without having previously lived in England, and only the second, after Joe Baker, to have done so without having previously played in the English football league system.

== Early life ==
Hargreaves was born in Calgary, Alberta, as the youngest of three boys for Margaret and Colin Hargreaves, who had emigrated from the United Kingdom at the start of the 1980s. His father played football for the Bolton Wanderers youth side and also for the Calgary Kickers of the Canadian Soccer League. He is the only member of his family born in Canada; his brother Darren and his mother were both born in Wales, and his other brother Neil and his father were born in England.

As a youngster in North America, in addition to football, Hargreaves grew up watching and playing sports like basketball, ice hockey, and American football. His sporting heroes were basketball icon Michael Jordan and American football and baseball player Deion Sanders.

== Club career ==
=== Bayern Munich ===
Hargreaves tried out for Bayern Munich in October 1996 and moved at the age of 16 from Calgary Foothills to the German club on 1 July 1997. He played in the Under-19 team for two and a half years before spending nine months with the amateur team. While with the Under-19s, the team reached the final of the German Championship in 1998. They lost in the final to Borussia Dortmund, but only after a penalty shoot-out at Dortmund's Stadion Rote Erde.

On 12 August 2000, Hargreaves played in his first Bundesliga match against Hertha Berlin, making an appearance as a substitute for Carsten Jancker in the 83rd minute. His first start came against SpVgg Unterhaching on 16 September 2000. That season the club were Bundesliga champions and also won the UEFA Champions League, with Hargreaves starting the final in central midfield. Hargreaves is one of only three English players to have won a Champions League medal with a non-English club, alongside two-time winner Steve McManaman (who won the Champions League with Real Madrid in 1999–2000 and 2001–02) and Jude Bellingham (who won the Champions League with Real Madrid in 2024).

In the 2001–02 season, Hargreaves established himself as a first team regular. He made 46 appearances in all, with the club finishing third in the Bundesliga, making the quarter-finals of the Champions League and being defeated in the DFB-Pokal by Schalke. The club regained their Bundesliga title in 2002–03, along with the DFB-Pokal. On 26 January 2003, Hargreaves scored his first Bundesliga goal in the game against Borussia Mönchengladbach.

2002–03 saw Hargreaves out injured on three occasions. In September, he tore a thigh muscle, then in October a calf muscle. Towards the end of the season adductor problems meant he missed a further three weeks. Altogether he made 25 Bundesliga appearances, four in cup games and three in the Champions League.

The 2003–04 season was Hargreaves' first with Bayern without winning any silverware. After clinching the double the year before, the Bavarian side finished second in the Bundesliga, and were knocked out of the Champions League by Real Madrid. Hargreaves made a total of 38 appearances for the club in this season.

In 2004–05 Hargreaves picked up another German championship and DFB-Pokal. He made 27 appearances in the Bundesliga (one goal), played in three Cup games (two goals) and eight Champions League games. In the 2005–06 season, he added another Bundesliga and DFB-Pokal title. Hargreaves scored the first goal at the new Allianz Arena in a competitive match on 5 August 2005, against Borussia Mönchengladbach. In all, he made 15 league appearances (one goal), four cup appearances (two goals) and three Champions League appearances. In October 2005, he extended his contract at Bayern for another four years.

In the 2006–07 season, Hargreaves broke his leg, which kept him out of most of Bayern's league campaign that season. He recovered in time to take part in Bayern's victory over Real Madrid in the Champions League, progressing after an aggregate score of 4–4 thanks to their two away goals in the 3–2 defeat in the first leg at Madrid's Santiago Bernabéu. However, Bayern were knocked out in the quarter-final by Milan and finished fourth in the Bundesliga, missing out on Champions League football for the first time since 1996. In total he played 145 top-flight matches in Germany for Bayern.

=== Manchester United ===
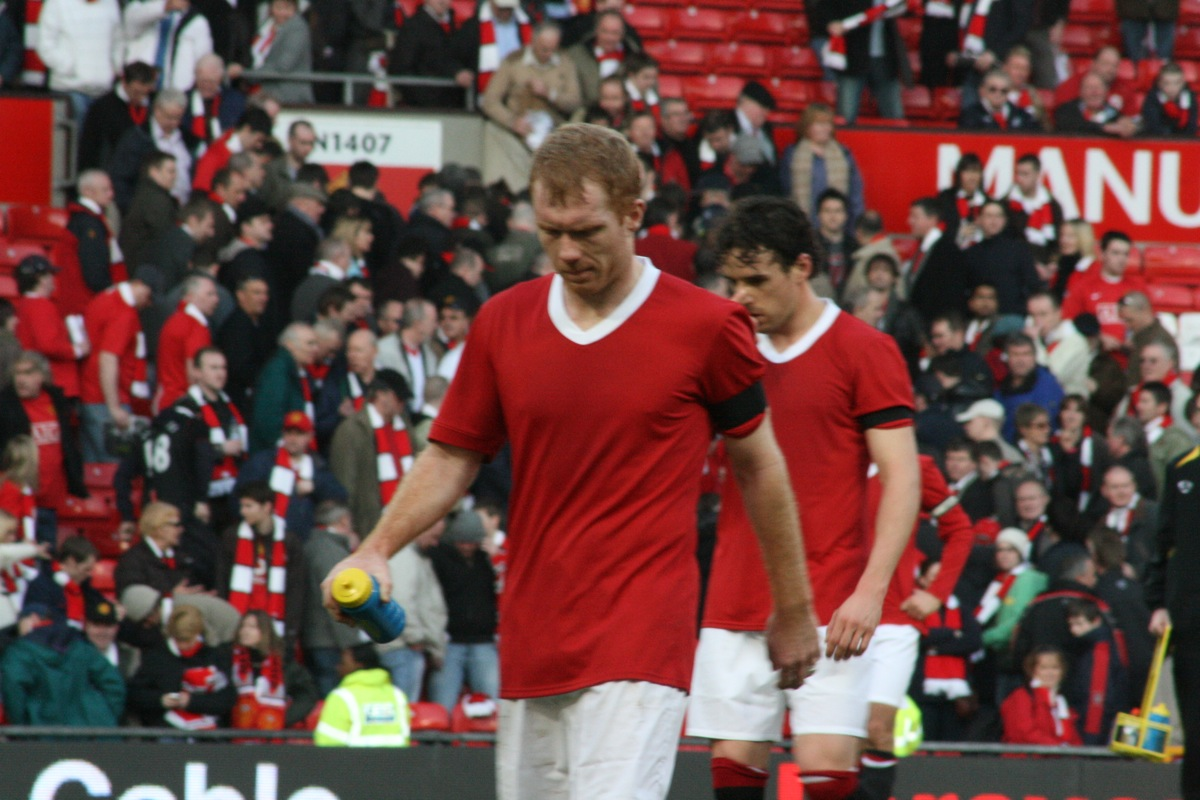
Hargreaves (background) in a 2008 Manchester derby at Old Trafford

On 31 May 2007, it was announced that Hargreaves would join Manchester United on 1 July 2007, after almost a year of negotiations between Bayern Munich and United for a fee of around £17 million. Hargreaves was finally unveiled as a United player on 1 July, having signed a four-year contract with the club. He was then revealed to the press on 9 July, along with fellow newcomer Nani. Hargreaves was given the number 4 shirt at Old Trafford.

Hargreaves made his first United appearance in a friendly against Peterborough United on 4 August, coming on as a second-half substitute in a 3–1 victory. He made his first Premier League appearance in United's third game of the season, in the derby match away to Manchester City in a 1–0 defeat. Hargreaves scored his first league goal for United against Fulham on 1 March, a free kick from just outside the penalty box. He scored his second league goal for the club on 13 April, a free kick winner against Arsenal. In his first season with United, they won the Premier League and Champions League titles. In the Champions League final, Hargreaves played all 120 minutes, starting on the right of midfield, and scored United's fourth penalty of the shootout as they defeated Chelsea 6–5 on penalties.

The start of Hargreaves' second season at United was hampered by injury, a recurring patellar tendinitis problem that restricted him to sporadic appearances in 2008–09. After trips to specialists in both London and Sweden yielded no results, Hargreaves travelled to Colorado, USA, in November 2008 to visit renowned knee surgeon, Richard Steadman. Hargreaves underwent surgery on his right knee on 10 November and received a similar operation on his left knee in January 2009. However, this meant that he would miss the remainder of the 2008–09 season, ultimately meaning he would miss out on a second Premier League title as well as League Cup, FIFA Club World Cup and FA Community Shield winner's medals. Hargreaves underwent his rehabilitation programme in the United States, and was due to return to training with United at the Audi Cup in Munich. However, upon assessment, it was decided that he should continue with his rehabilitation in the United States. Hargreaves returned to the club on 23 September 2009, joined by his physiotherapist for a week to aid the transition process and for the club to understand his rehabilitation programme.

In January 2010, it was speculated that Hargreaves was slated to return in time for United's Champions League first knockout round tie against Milan, despite not being fully match-fit. However, on 4 February, Hargreaves suffered a major setback to hopes of playing in the 2010 FIFA World Cup as Alex Ferguson omitted him from the squad for the knockout stage in favour of Belgian defender Ritchie De Laet. It was expected that Hargreaves would make his return from injury in a reserve team match against Manchester City on 11 March, but on the day of the match, Hargreaves pulled out of the game to continue with his training regime. He eventually made his comeback a week later, playing for 45 minutes of United's reserve team match against Burnley on 18 March. On 24 April, Hargreaves was named as an unused substitute for the first-team match against Tottenham Hotspur.

On 2 May 2010, Hargreaves made his Premier League return in the 93rd minute of United's penultimate game of the season against Sunderland. It was his first Premier League action since a 1–1 draw with Chelsea in September 2008, in which time he had missed 113 matches in 20 months. Despite this, Hargreaves missed the beginning of the 2010–11 season, having suffered another injury, for which he travelled to the United States to see a specialist. On 24 September, manager Ferguson announced that Hargreaves had returned to training. On 6 November 2010, he made his first start since September 2008 against Wolverhampton Wanderers, however it was short-lived after a hamstring injury forced his withdrawal for Bébé just five minutes into the match, which United went on to win 2–1.

On 22 May 2011, Ferguson confirmed that the club would not offer Hargreaves a new contract. His contract expired at the end of the 2010–11 season and he left the club, despite offering to play the 2011–12 season for free. Hargreaves later posted videos on YouTube of him exercising, in order to prove his fitness to potential clubs. Buoyed by Richard Steadman's optimistic assessment that Hargreaves' knees, a source of injury for a number of years, could withstand the impact of "jumping from the Eiffel Tower", a number of clubs including Bolton Wanderers Aston Villa, Tottenham Hotspur, Leicester City, West Bromwich Albion, Nottingham Forest Queens Park Rangers, Rangers, and "several MLS clubs", were believed to be considering an offer for Hargreaves. In Ferguson's autobiography released in 2013, he called Hargreaves one of his most disappointing signings. In 2020, ESPN ranked his transfer to United as the 27th worst Premier League transfer of all time.

=== Manchester City ===
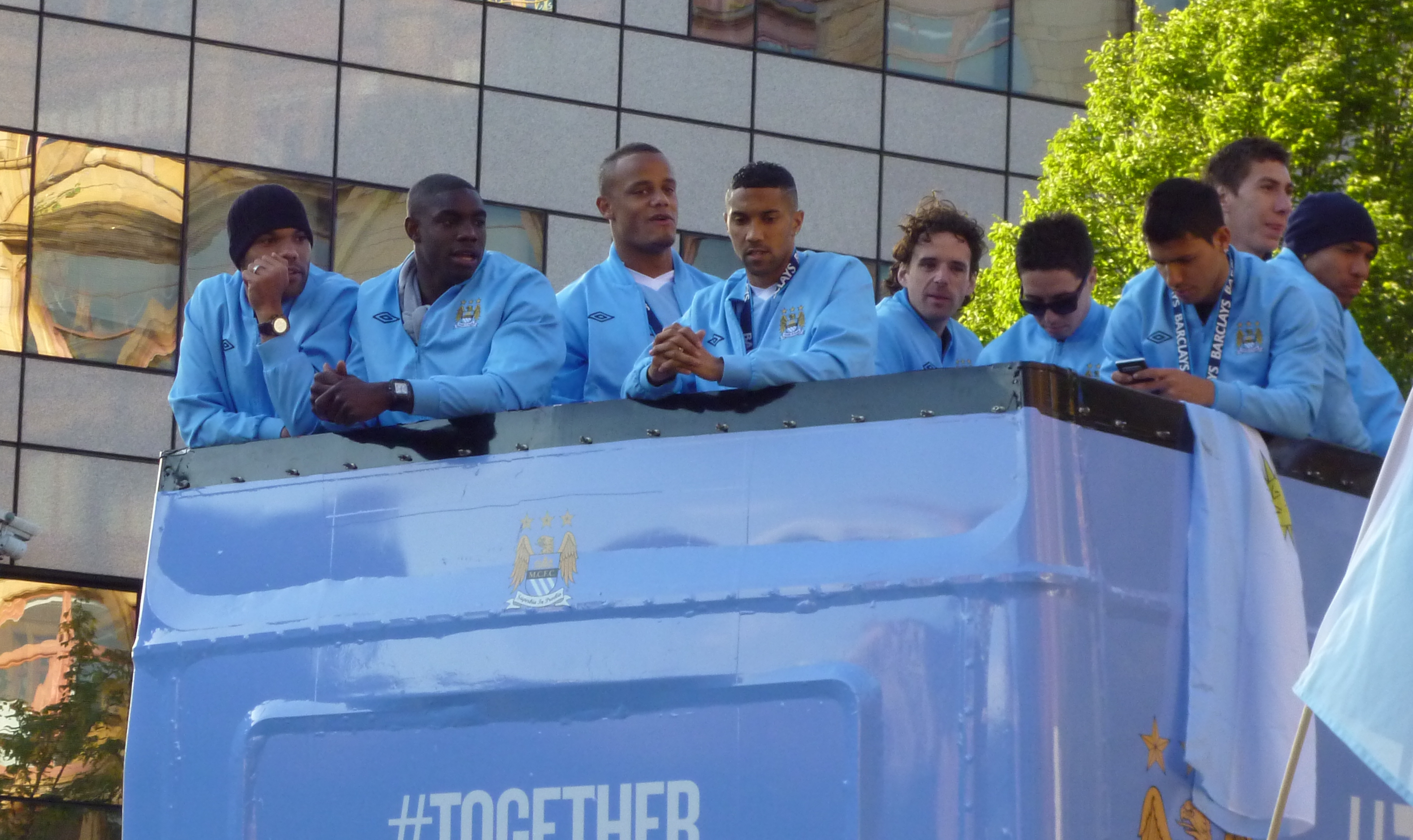
Hargreaves (centre) on an open-top bus victory parade after Manchester City won the Premier League, 2012

On 30 August 2011, Hargreaves was pictured supposedly having a medical with Manchester City doctor Phillip Batty ahead of a move to the club. City had been looking for a replacement for Patrick Vieira who retired the season before and an additional midfielder due to Yaya Touré's anticipated absence during January 2012 because of the 2012 Africa Cup of Nations. They had earmarked Daniele De Rossi, Fernando Gago and Mark van Bommel; but, when these approaches failed, City turned to Hargreaves – a player they had been looking at for a few months prior to their initial approach.

On 31 August 2011, City confirmed that they had signed Hargreaves on a one-year deal. It was expected Hargreaves would join West Bromwich Albion, but the City offer came as a surprise. The move offered Hargreaves an opportunity for Champions League football as the club looked to challenge United for the Premier League. However, he was left out of the Champions League squad. Hargreaves made his City debut against Birmingham City in the League Cup, and opened the scoring in a 2–0 victory with a goal in the 17th minute. On 27 April 2012, it was confirmed that he would be released at the end of the season after just four appearances for the club. City were to be victorious in the Premier League, winning their first English title for 44 years, with Hargreaves being involved in the on-pitch celebrations after defeating Queens Park Rangers on the final day. However, after only playing one league match all season, he did not qualify to receive a winner's medal.

Following his release, he trained with Queens Park Rangers, but was not offered a contract by the club.

== International career ==
Born in Canada to a Welsh mother and an English father, Hargreaves was eligible to play international football for England, Wales or Canada. Hargreaves was not selected to play for the Canada U-17 World Cup team, despite being a promising youth player who trialled for Bayern Munich and was about to sign a contract with them. Hargreaves drew the ire of soccer fans in Canada for choosing to play for England. One fansite went to the lengths of demanding that the three Canadian teams in MLS (Montreal Impact, Toronto FC and the Vancouver Whitecaps) never sign Hargreaves to play for them, after he was courted by the Vancouver Whitecaps in 2010.

=== Wales ===
He represented Wales at the 1998 Milk Cup where Wales finished in third place behind Turkey and Northern Ireland, but finished above Russia. He was set to make his début for the Wales U21 team against the Belarus U21 team in September 2000 but pulled out of the squad after he was approached by England.

=== England ===
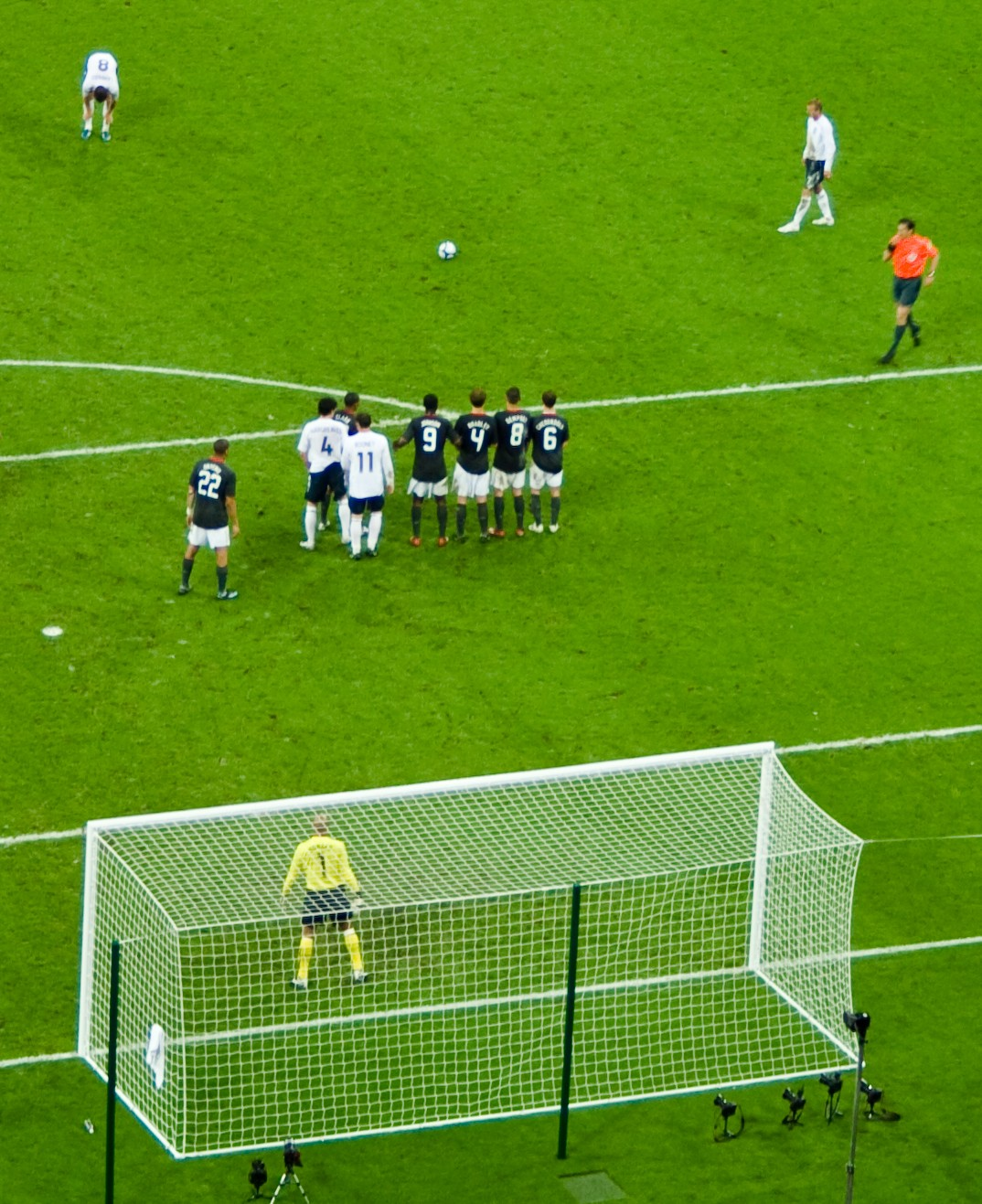
Hargreaves (wearing No.4) playing for England, 2008

On 31 August 2000, the then England under-21 manager, Howard Wilkinson, called the 19-year-old into his squad for the match against Georgia. The game, played at the Riverside Stadium, Middlesbrough, ended in a 6–1 win for the home team. Further appearances for the under-21s followed in friendlies against Italy and Spain.

Hargreaves played his first full international game on 15 August 2001 against the Netherlands at White Hart Lane, giving him the distinction of being the only player to appear for England despite having never lived in England. He was also the second player (after Joe Baker) to have appeared for England without having played in English league football and the first to appear for England without having played in Britain. In only his second cap he came on as a substitute as England famously beat Germany 5–1 in the Olympiastadion. Hargreaves was the only player playing outside the Premier League to be selected for England's 2002 FIFA World Cup squad. Hargreaves was injured after just fifteen minutes of England's second group game against Argentina and had to be substituted.

Although he had not usually been part of the first-team, he was selected for the England squads at Euro 2004 in Portugal and the 2006 World Cup in Germany despite criticism from sections of the press and public. The generally negative perception of him by English fans had not been helped by his seeming to have an essence of "German-ness", exacerbated by his Canadian accent and fluency in German. While restricted to three appearances as a substitute at Euro 2004, Hargreaves was in the starting lineup of England's final three matches in 2006. In a tournament in which England were generally regarded as having underachieved, he was, by the end of England's participation, widely considered one of the few successes of the English squad. He was named Man of the match in the quarter-final against Portugal, the game in which England were eliminated after a penalty shootout, Hargreaves having been the only successful English penalty taker. In 2006, he won both England Player of the Year, and England Player of the World Cup in official FA polls, the first to win both in the same year.

Hargreaves picked up the Man of the match award in England's 4–0 win over Greece on 16 August 2006. On 30 January 2007, he was voted England Player of the Year 2006, as voted for by visitors to the official FA site.

In June 2007, FIFA announced that Hargreaves and Philipp Lahm would visit South Africa in advance support for the 2010 FIFA World Cup.

Hargreaves' final England cap came in 2008 in a friendly against the USA.

Injuries meant he never played for England again. In the run-up to the 2010 World Cup, England coach Fabio Capello aimed to give Hargreaves an emergency call-up to the England 2010 World Cup squad. However, Hargreaves' injuries meant Capello could not call him up.

After his transfer to Manchester City in 2011, Capello hoped that Hargreaves would regain his fitness, saying: "I hope he will be really good in the short-term for Manchester City and also for England."

== Player profile ==
=== Style of play and reception ===
Hargreaves was known as a hard-working and "solid defensive midfielder who worked tirelessly to win the ball" and provide his teammates with possession. He was voted the most promising youngster for 2001 by Germany's football professionals and was described by Franz Beckenbauer as "a huge talent." A highly versatile player, Hargreaves was also capable of playing as a wide midfielder or at right-back. He attributed his playing style to a blend of different footballing cultures, once explaining: "Tactically I'm pretty much German, but with my English head I like to get involved and win tackles." Praised for his stamina, tactical awareness, free-kick ability, and capacity to dictate the game from a deep position, he was often considered a "big-game player" who thrived in high-pressure situations and crucial matches. Bayern Munich chairman Karl-Heinz Rummenigge praised him as "one of the best holding midfielders in the world."

=== Injury history ===
Hargreaves' career was affected by injuries, the bulk of which formed in 2006, the year he won the award for England's best player at the 2006 World Cup. Hargreaves stated that he believed the bulk of his injury problems to have been in 2007, when he returned from injury after breaking his leg. He felt that his muscle in his leg was weaker than before he sustained his broken leg, and initially Hargreaves ignored the aching and played on.

Ahead of the 2008–09 season, Hargreaves revealed that he had been hampered by a recurring tendinitis problem and played the previous campaign at only "50 or 60 per cent" fitness. It emerged by 2008 that Hargreaves was suffering from a problem with his patella tendon and this was eventually narrowed down to patellar tendinitis. Surgeon Richard Steadman stated that Hargreaves knees were in a worse state than any other he had come across in his 35 years of experience. After numerous operations on both his knees, Steadman said in September 2010 that Hargreaves' problems with his knees were over, but Alex Ferguson denied this. In November 2010, Hargreaves made his first start for Manchester United in 777 days, but limped off after six minutes.

In 2011, Manchester United did not renew his contract due to his injury troubles. Speculation rumbled about Hargreaves retiring due to his injuries; but, determined to prove himself, he uploaded YouTube videos of himself training to convince potential clubs of his fitness. His determination to carry on despite chronic injury won him admirers.

After his move to Manchester City, Hargreaves stated that he felt like "a guinea pig" during his time on the treatment table at Manchester United. He believed that his prolonged trouble with injuries was due to the revolutionary treatments he was forced to undergo in an effort to solve a problem he felt had been exacerbated by the injections. Alex Ferguson has rejected these claims.

== Media career ==
Hargreaves appears as a pundit for TNT Sports as part of their Premier League, FA Cup, UEFA Europa League and UEFA Champions League coverage. He is also a football analyst on news channel CNN, and has covered the Euro 2016 competition in France.

== Career statistics ==
=== Club ===
Appearances and goals by club, season and competition
Club	Season	League			National cup		League cup		Continental		Other		Total		Ref.
Club	Season	Division	Apps	Goals	Apps	Goals	Apps	Goals	Apps	Goals	Apps	Goals	Apps	Goals	Ref.
Bayern Munich	2000–01	Bundesliga	14	0	1	0	1	0	4 (Note: Appearances in the UEFA Champions League)	0	–		20	0	
Bayern Munich	2001–02	Bundesliga	29	0	4	0	1	0	13	0	2 (Note: One appearance in the Intercontinental Cup, one appearance in the UEFA Super Cup)	0	49	0	
Bayern Munich	2002–03	Bundesliga	25	1	5	1	0	0	5	0	–		35	2	
Bayern Munich	2003–04	Bundesliga	25	2	3	0	1	0	6	0	–		35	2	
Bayern Munich	2004–05	Bundesliga	27	1	3	2	0	0	8	0	–		38	3	
Bayern Munich	2005–06	Bundesliga	16	1	5	2	1	0	2	0	–		24	3	
Bayern Munich	2006–07	Bundesliga	9	0	1	0	2	0	5	0	0	0	17	0	
Bayern Munich	Total		145	5	22	5	6	0	43	0	2	0	218	10	—
Manchester United	2007–08	Premier League	23	2	3	0	0	0	8	0	0	0	34	2	
Manchester United	2008–09	Premier League	2	0	0	0	0	0	1	0	0	0	3	0	
Manchester United	2009–10	Premier League	1	0	0	0	0	0	0	0	0	0	1	0	
Manchester United	2010–11	Premier League	1	0	0	0	0	0	0	0	–		1	0	
Manchester United	Total		27	2	3	0	0	0	9	0	0	0	39	2	—
Manchester City	2011–12	Premier League	1	0	1	0	2	1	0	0	–		4	1	
Career total			173	7	26	5	8	1	52	0	2	0	261	13	—

=== International ===
Appearances and goals by national team and year
National team	Year	Apps	Goals
England	2001	2	0
England	2002	8	0
England	2003	5	0
England	2004	9	0
England	2005	5	0
England	2006	8	0
England	2007	2	0
England	2008	3	0
Total		42	0

== Honours ==
Bayern Munich II

- Oberbayern Cup: 2001

Bayern Munich

- Bundesliga: 2000–01, 2002–03, 2004–05, 2005–06
- DFB-Pokal: 2002–03, 2004–05, 2005–06
- DFB-Ligapokal: 2000
- UEFA Champions League: 2000–01
- Intercontinental Cup: 2001

Manchester United

- Premier League: 2007–08
- UEFA Champions League: 2007–08

Individual

- Bravo Award: 2001
- England Player of the Year: 2006

== See also ==
- List of England international footballers born outside England
- List of sportspeople who competed for more than one nation
