= Marco van Hoogdalem =

Dutch footballer

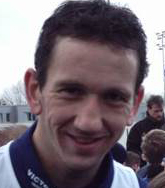

Personal information
- Date of birth: 23 May 1972 (age 54)
- Place of birth: Gorinchem, Netherlands
- Height: 1.91 m (6 ft 3 in)
- Positions: Defender; holding midfielder

Team information
- Current team: Groene Ster (asst. coach)

Youth career
- 1977–1989: SVW

Senior career*
Years	Team	Apps	(Gls)
1989–1993	RKC	87	(11)
1993–1996	Roda JC	111	(5)
1997–2006	Schalke 04	151	(10)
2004	→ Roda JC (loan)	10	(0)
Total		359	(26)

International career
1992–1993	Netherlands U21	10	(1)
- * Club domestic league appearances and goals

Marco van Hoogdalem (Dutch pronunciation: [ˈmɑrkoː vɑn ɦoːɣˈdaːlɛm], born 23 May 1972) is a Dutch retired football player who had the most success playing for FC Schalke 04 in Germany.

He was appointed assistant coach at Roda JC U-19 in 2020 and named assistant coach at Groene Ster in 2023.

== Club career ==
Born in Gorinchem, he started playing football at local side SVW before joining Eredivisie side RKC where he played as a holding midfielder. After a lenghty spell at Roda JC, he moved abroad to play for Schalke 04 with whom he would immediately win the 1996–97 UEFA Cup. At Schalke he was reunited with manager and compatriot Huub Stevens and they sensationally lost the German 2000–01 Bundesliga title in the last second of the season. After hip surgery, he was overlooked by manager Jupp Heynckes and loaned to former club Roda JC in 2004.

== International career ==
Van Hoogdalem played 10 games for the Netherlands national under-21 football team.

== Personal life ==
Van Hoogdalem and his wife run an inn in Ubachsberg. They have two sons. During his time at Schalke he struggled with his fitness, was diagnosed with Primary sclerosing cholangitis and finally underwent a liver transplant in 2016.

== Honours ==
Schalke

- DFB-Pokal: 2000–01, 2001–02
- DFL-Ligapokal: 2005
- UEFA Cup: 1996–97
