= Frank Wiblishauser =

German former professional footballer (born 1977)

Personal information
- Date of birth: 18 October 1977 (age 49)
- Place of birth: Memmingen, West Germany
- Height: 1.80 m (5 ft 11 in)
- Position: Central defender

Youth career
- 1982–1994: FC Memmingen
- 1994–1995: Bayern Munich

Senior career*
Years	Team	Apps	(Gls)
1995–2000	Bayern Munich (A)	114	(1)
1996–2000	Bayern Munich	0	(0)
2000–2005	1. FC Nürnberg	76	(1)
2005–2006	St. Gallen	23	(0)
2006–2010	TuS Koblenz	60	(0)
Total		273	(2)

International career
1997–1998	Germany U-21	9	(0)
1998	Germany Olympic	5	(0)
- * Club domestic league appearances and goals

Frank Wiblishauser (born 18 October 1977) is a German former professional footballer who played as a central defender.

== Career ==
Wiblishauser began his career with his hometown club, FC Memmingen, before joining the Youth Team of Bayern Munich in 1994. He was promoted to the reserve team a year later, and spent five years playing in the Regionalliga Süd. He was also a member of Bayern's first-team squad from 1996, but did not make a first-team appearance. In 2000, he left for 1. FC Nürnberg, where he spent five years, and was involved in two promotions and two relegations between the 2. Bundesliga and the Bundesliga. His time there, though, was marred by injury and he was only able to make 76 appearances.

Wiblishauser left for Switzerland shortly after the beginning of the 2005–06 season, signing for FC St. Gallen. A year later he returned to Germany to sign for TuS Koblenz, where he stayed until being released in 2010, at which point his career ended.
