= Berkant Göktan =

Turkish-German footballer

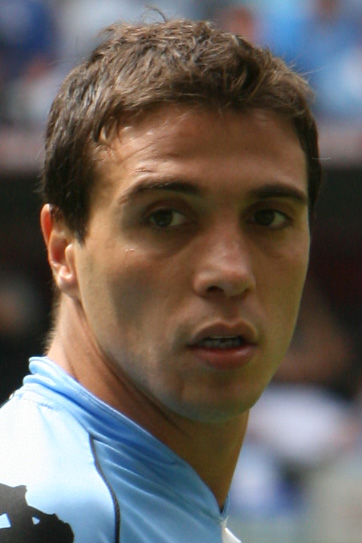
- Göktan in 2007

Personal information
- Full name: Berkant Göktan
- Date of birth: 12 December 1980 (age 45)
- Place of birth: Munich, West Germany
- Height: 1.76 m (5 ft 9 in)
- Position: Striker

Youth career
- 1987–1989: Helios Munich
- 1989–1998: Bayern Munich

Senior career*
Years	Team	Apps	(Gls)
1998–2001	Bayern Munich (A)	42	(20)
1998–2001	Bayern Munich	2	(0)
1999	→ Borussia Mönchengladbach (loan)	5	(0)
1999–2000	→ Arminia Bielefeld (loan)	14	(1)
2001–2004	Galatasaray	41	(9)
2004–2005	Beşiktaş	4	(1)
2005–2006	1. FC Kaiserslautern	7	(1)
2006–2008	1860 Munich	37	(20)
2010	Muangthong United	0	(0)
2013–2014	SV Heimstetten	1	(0)
Total		153	(52)

International career
1998–2001	Turkey U21	29	(10)
- * Club domestic league appearances and goals

Berkant Göktan (born 12 December 1980) is a Turkish-German former footballer. He was considered one of the hottest prospects in Germany during the late 1990s.

== Club career ==
Göktan was born in Munich. Giovanni Trapattoni called him up to train with Bayern's senior squad when he was 16 years old, while Ottmar Hitzfeld granted him his professional debut at age 17. He replaced Hasan Salihamidžić in a 1998–99 UEFA Champions League game against Manchester United with 30 minutes left when the score was 2–1 for Manchester. Bayern ended up tying the game.

In January 1999, he negotiated a loan deal to Borussia Mönchengladbach.

In September 2006, Göktan joined TSV 1860 Munich in the Bundesliga and became a star of the team. On 21 October 2008, he was released from his contract after being positively tested for cocaine consumption.

On 21 January 2010, he has signed a one-year contract with Thai Premier League champions Muangthong United who were hoping to qualify for their first ever AFC Champions League. Göktan was the club's first signing under new coach René Desaeyere. He left the club without featuring in a single match because of fitness.

== Honours ==
Bayern Munich

- Bundesliga: 2000–01

Galatasaray

- Süper Lig: 2001–02
