= Patrick Mölzl =

German footballer and coach

Personal information
- Date of birth: 28 December 1980 (age 45)
- Place of birth: Munich, West Germany
- Height: 1.76 m (5 ft 9 in)
- Position: Midfielder

Youth career
- 1986–1992: SC Bogenhausen
- 1992–1994: SV Gartenstadt Trudering
- 1994–1995: 1860 Munich
- 1995–1998: Bayern Munich

Senior career*
Years	Team	Apps	(Gls)
1998–2002	Bayern Munich II	99	(8)
2002–2003	Greuther Fürth	7	(0)
2003–2004	→ FC St. Pauli (loan)	26	(1)
2004–2009	FC Augsburg	131	(8)
2010–2011	FC Ingolstadt 04	14	(0)
2011–2012	FC Ingolstadt 04 II	1	(0)
Total		278	(17)

Managerial career
- 2013–2016: SV Kirchanschöring (player-manager)
- 2017: SV Kirchanschöring
- 2017–2018: Wacker Burghausen
- 2019: Dynamo Dresden (assistant)
- 2021-: FC Liefering (assistant)
- * Club domestic league appearances and goals

Patrick Mölzl (born 28 December 1980) is a German former football coach and former player who played as a midfielder.

== Coaching career ==
On 28 February 2019, Mölzl was appointed assistant manager to newly hired manager Cristian Fiél at Dynamo Dresden, signing a deal until the end of the season. The deal was later extended until the summer 2021. On 2 December 2019, Fiél and his staff, including Mölzl, was fired.

== Personal life ==
Mölzl is the son of Erhan Önal, formerly of Bayern Munich and the first Turkish immigrant to play in the Bundesliga.
