= Waldemar Kryger =

Polish footballer

Personal information
- Full name: Waldemar Kryger
- Date of birth: 8 November 1968 (age 57)
- Place of birth: Poznań, Poland
- Height: 1.77 m (5 ft 10 in)
- Position: Defender

Youth career
- 1979–1982: Patria Buk

Senior career*
Years	Team	Apps	(Gls)
1982–1983	Patria Buk		
1983–1997	Lech Poznań	258	(3)
1997–2002	VfL Wolfsburg	126	(1)
2002–2004	Lech Poznań	44	(0)

International career
1997–1998	Poland	5	(1)
- * Club domestic league appearances and goals

Waldemar Kryger (born 8 November 1968) is a Polish former professional footballer who played as a defender.

He began his senior career at Patria Buk, playing there for one season (1982–83). He spent much of his career playing for Lech Poznań, where he spent 17 years (from 1983–84 to 1997–98 and from 2002–03 to 2003–04), appearing in a total of 302 league matches and scoring three goals. With Lech, he contributed to winning three Polish League titles in (1989–90, 1991–92 and 1992–93), three Polish Super Cups (1990 and 1992, 2004) and two Polish Cups (1987–88 and 2003–04). After 15 seasons at Lech, he moved to German side VfL Wolfsburg in 1997. He played a total of 126 matches and scored one goal. He returned to Poznań in 2002 where he ended up finishing his playing career.

He played for the national team in five matches, making his debut on 14 February 1997 during a match against Lithuania. He scored his only national team goal against Latvia on 17 February 1997. After finishing his playing career, he became a coach. He worked under Czesław Michniewicz while he was the head coach of Lech Poznań. Later, Kryger decided to become a coach for the Lech Poznań youth teams.

== Honours ==
Lech Poznań

- Ekstraklasa: 1989–90, 1991–92, 1992–93
- Polish Cup: 1987–88, 2003–04
- Polish Super Cup: 1990, 1992, 2004
