= Stephan Kling =

German footballer (born 1981)

Personal information
- Date of birth: 22 March 1981 (age 45)
- Place of birth: Dachau, West Germany
- Height: 1.80 m (5 ft 11 in)
- Position: Defender

Youth career
- 1986–1987: SC Amicitia Munich
- 1987–2000: Bayern Munich

Senior career*
Years	Team	Apps	(Gls)
2000–2002	Bayern Munich (A)	60	(0)
2001–2002	Bayern Munich	0	(0)
2002–2005	Hamburger SV (A)	19	(1)
2002–2005	Hamburger SV	26	(0)
2005–2007	1. FC Saarbrücken	33	(1)
2007–2009	SC Rheindorf Altach	54	(3)
2009–2010	VfB Süsterfeld		
2010–2011	Eintracht Wetzlar	17	(1)
2011	Sportfreunde Lotte	0	(0)
Total		209	(6)

International career
1999–2000	Germany U-18		
2000–2001	Germany U20	10	(0)
2002–2004	Germany U21	7	(0)
2002	Germany Team 2006	1	(0)
- * Club domestic league appearances and goals

Stephan Kling (born 22 March 1981) is a German former professional footballer who played as a defender. He is a product of Bayern Munich's youth system, and has represented Germany at under-21 level.

== Honours ==
Hamburger SV

- DFL-Ligapokal: 2003
