= Antonio Di Salvo =

German footballer (born 1979)

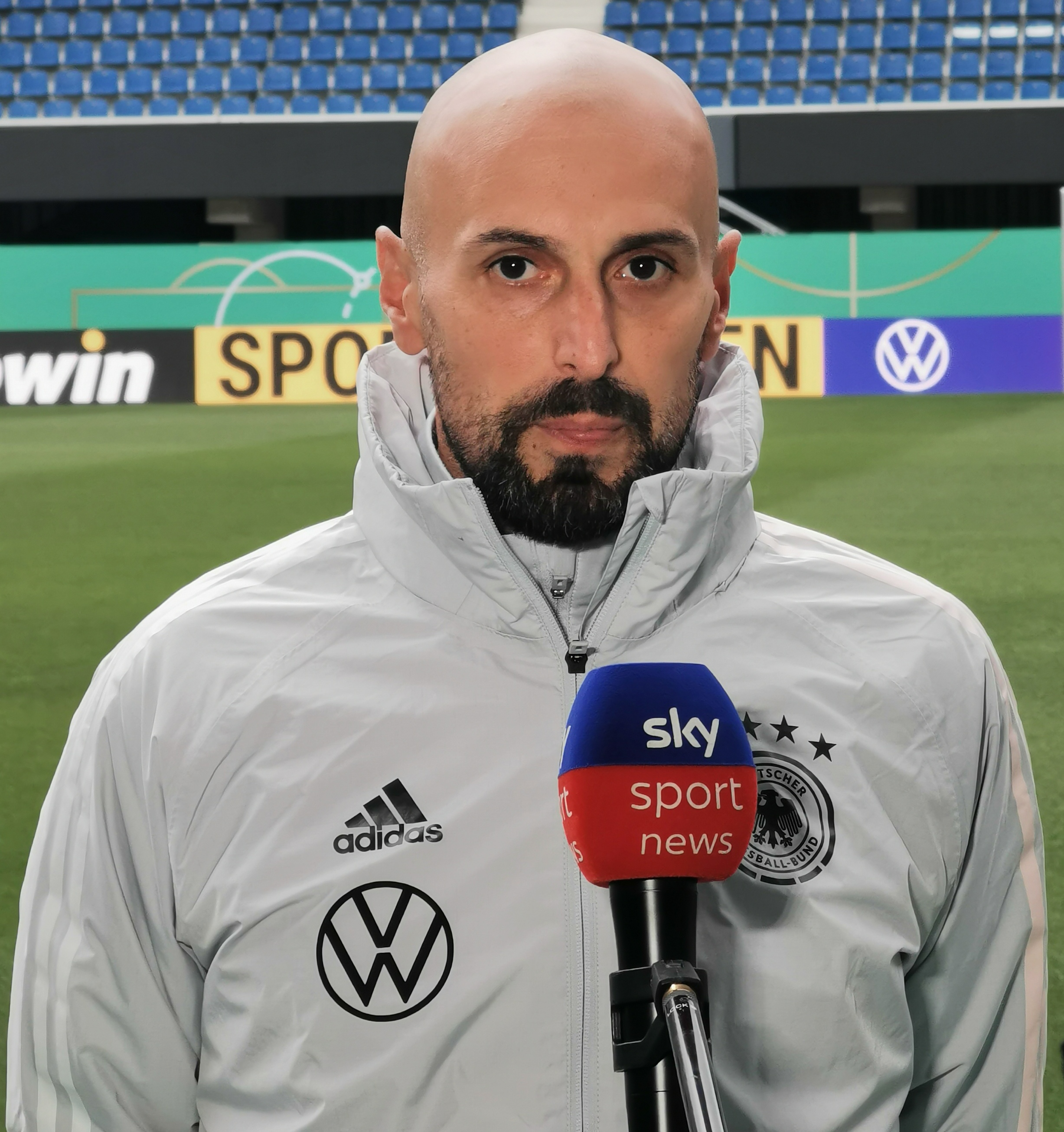
- Di Salvo in 2021

Personal information
- Full name: Antonio Di Salvo
- Date of birth: 5 June 1979 (age 47)
- Place of birth: Paderborn, West Germany
- Height: 1.84 m (6 ft 0 in)
- Position: Forward

Team information
- Current team: Germany U21 (manager)

Youth career
- 1985–1991: BV Bad Lippspringe
- 1991–2000: SC Paderborn

Senior career*
Years	Team	Apps	(Gls)
1996–2000	SC Paderborn	53	(16)
2000–2001	Bayern Munich (A)	44	(29)
2000–2001	Bayern Munich	6	(0)
2002–2006	Hansa Rostock	112	(20)
2006–2009	1860 Munich	65	(11)
2010	Kapfenberger SV	7	(0)
Total		287	(76)

Managerial career
- 2021–: Germany U21
Medal record
Representing Germany (as manager)
UEFA European Under-21 Championship
Runner-up	2025 Slovakia
- * Club domestic league appearances and goals

Antonio Di Salvo (born 5 June 1979) is a German football manager and former forward. He is the manager of the Germany U21 national team.

== Playing career ==
Di Salvo began his senior career with played with his local club SC Paderborn from 1996 to 2000. He had a brief stints with Bayern Munich from 2000 to 2001, before moving to Hansa Rostock until 2006. He transferred to 1860 Munich shortly after. After scoring eight goals in the 2007–08 season, he suffered a knee injury that kept him out of football for a while. He ended his career with Kapfenberger SV, making seven appearances in 2010.

== Managerial career ==
After his playing career, Di Salvo worked on his coaching badges and worked as assistant with the Bayern Munich U17 from 2011 to 2013. He was named the assistant for the Germany U19s shortly thereafter in 2013. In 2016, he was named the assistant manager for the Germany U21s under Stefan Kuntz, and held the post for five years. He formally passed his coaching license in 2018, receiving a DFB manager license. On 23 September 2021, Di Salvo was named the manager for the Germany U21s, as Kuntz left to manage the Turkey national team.

== Personal life ==
Born in Germany, Di Salvo is of Italian descent with roots in Sicily.

== Honours ==
=== Player ===
Bayern Munich

- Bundesliga: 2000–01
- DFB-Ligapokal: 2000

=== Managerial ===
Germany U21

- UEFA European Under-21 Championship runner-up: 2025
