= 2001 DFB-Pokal final =

- Match programme cover
- Event: 2000–01 DFB-Pokal
Union Berlin	Schalke 04
0	2
- Date: 26 May 2001
- Venue: Olympiastadion, Berlin
- Referee: Hermann Albrecht (Kaufbeuren)
- Attendance: 73,011
- Weather: Clear; 22 °C (72 °F); 29% humidity

The 2001 DFB-Pokal final decided the winner of the 2000–01 DFB-Pokal, the 58th season of Germany's premier knockout football cup competition. It was played on 26 May 2001 at the Olympiastadion in Berlin. Schalke 04 won the match 2–0 against Union Berlin to claim their 3rd cup title.

== Route to the final ==
The DFB-Pokal began with 64 teams in a single-elimination knockout cup competition. There were a total of five rounds leading up to the final. Teams were drawn against each other, and the winner after 90 minutes would advance. If still tied, 30 minutes of extra time was played. If the score was still level, a penalty shoot-out was used to determine the winner.

Note: In all results below, the score of the finalist is given first (H: home; A: away).

Union Berlin		Round	Schalke 04
Opponent	Result	2000–01 DFB-Pokal	Opponent	Result
Rot-Weiß Oberhausen (H)	2–0	Round 1	TSV Rain am Lech (A)	7–0
Greuther Fürth (H)	1–0	Round 2	FC St. Pauli (A)	3–1 (a.e.t.)
SSV Ulm (H)	4–2	Round of 16	Borussia Dortmund (H)	2–1
VfL Bochum (H)	1–0	Quarter-finals	1. FC Magdeburg (A)	1–0
Borussia Mönchengladbach (H)	2–2 (a.e.t.) (4–2 p)	Semi-finals	VfB Stuttgart (A)	3–0

== Match ==
=== Details ===
26 May 2001
19:30 CEST

Union Berlin	0–2	Schalke 04
	Report	Böhme 53', 58' (pen.)

Olympiastadion, Berlin
Attendance: 73,011
Referee: Hermann Albrecht (Kaufbeuren)

Union Berlin	Schalke 04

GK	26	(Germany) Sven Beuckert	(yellow card) 59'
SW	18	(Germany) Jens Tschiedel		(substituted off) 81'
CB	33	(Germany) Tom Persich
CB	11	(Germany) Daniel Ernemann	(yellow card) 47'	(substituted off) 56'
RWB	24	(Bulgaria) Emil Kremenliev
LWB	3	(Germany) Ronny Nikol
CM	4	(Germany) Steffen Menze (c)
CM	16	(Bulgaria) Hristo Koilov
AM	6	(Nigeria) Chibuike Okeke
CF	7	(Albania) Harun Isa		(substituted off) 70'
CF	22	(Federal Republic of Yugoslavia) Božidar Đurković
Substitutes:
GK	20	(Poland) Robert Wulnikowski
DF	2	(Germany) Gert Müller
DF	21	(Bulgaria) Adalbert Zafirov
MF	5	(Germany) Marko Tredup		(substituted in) 81'
MF	9	(Austria) Michael Zechner		(substituted in) 70'
MF	19	(Czech Republic) Jiří Balcárek
FW	25	(Brazil) Daniel Teixeira		(substituted in) 56'
Manager:
(Bulgaria) Georgi Vasilev

GK	1	(Germany) Oliver Reck
RB	18	(Netherlands) Niels Oude Kamphuis
CB	6	(Poland) Tomasz Hajto	(yellow card) 43'
CB	12	(Netherlands) Marco van Hoogdalem
LB	2	(Belgium) Nico Van Kerckhoven		(substituted off) 87'
DM	20	(Czech Republic) Jiří Němec		(substituted off) 84'
RM	14	(Germany) Gerald Asamoah	(yellow card) 71'	(substituted off) 80'
CM	7	(Germany) Andreas Möller
LM	8	(Germany) Jörg Böhme
CF	11	(Denmark) Ebbe Sand (c)
CF	21	(Belgium) Émile Mpenza
Substitutes:
GK	13	(Norway) Frode Grodås
DF	3	(Czech Republic) Radoslav Látal		(substituted in) 80'
DF	10	(Germany) Olaf Thon		(substituted in) 84'
DF	23	(Germany) Markus Happe
MF	5	(Germany) Sven Kmetsch
MF	19	(Germany) Mike Büskens		(substituted in) 87'
FW	9	(Netherlands) Youri Mulder
Manager:
(Netherlands) Huub Stevens

Assistant referees:
Josef Maier (Munich)
Heiner Müller (Bilsdorf)

Match rules

- 90 minutes.
- 30 minutes of extra time if necessary.
- Penalty shoot-out if scores still level.
- Seven named substitutes, of which up to three may be used.
