= 2000–01 DFB-Pokal =

Tournament details
- Country: Germany
- Teams: 64

Final positions
- Champions: Schalke 04
- Runners-up: 1. FC Union Berlin

Tournament statistics
- Matches played: 63
- Top goal scorer: Arie van Lent (6)

The 2000–01 DFB-Pokal was the 58th season of the annual German football cup competition. 64 teams competed in the tournament of six rounds which began on 25 August 2000 and ended on 26 May 2001. In the final Schalke 04 defeated third tier Union Berlin 2–0 thereby claiming their third title.

== Matches ==
Times up to 28 October 2000 and from 25 March 2001 are CEST (UTC+2). Times from 29 October 2000 to 24 March 2001 are CET (UTC+1).

=== First round ===
25 August 2000	Rot-Weiss Erfurt	0 – 2	SSV Ulm 1846	Erfurt
		Report (in German)	Medveď 8'; Scharinger 58'	Stadium: Steigerwaldstadion; Attendance: 4,100; Referee: Michael Weiner (Giesen)

25 August 2000	VfL Osnabrück	0 – 1	Hannover 96	Osnabrück
		Report (in German)	Stefulj 40'	Stadium: Stadion an der Bremer Brücke; Attendance: 8,100; Referee: Matthias Anklam (Buchholz in der Nordheide)

25 August 2000	Bayer Leverkusen (A)	1 – 2	FC St. Pauli	Leverkusen
	Marquinhos 49'	Report (in German)	Klasnić 32'; Rahn 38'	Stadium: Kleines Ulrich-Haberland-Stadion; Attendance: 1,400; Referee: Ralf Späker (Marl)

25 August 2000	Karlsruher SC	2 – 1	Chemnitzer FC	Karlsruhe
	Çetin 15'; Waterink 22'	Report (in German)	Skela 48'	Stadium: Wildparkstadion; Attendance: 6,400; Referee: Mike Pickel (Mendig)

25 August 2000	SC Halberg Brebach	0 – 5	1. FC Nürnberg
		Report (in German)	Hobsch 14', 77'; Ziemer 37', 56'; Tavčar 62'	Attendance: 2,000; Referee: Dirk Margenberg (Wermelskirchen)

25 August 2000	Kickers Emden	0 – 1	Mainz 05	Emden
		Report (in German)	Demandt 85'	Stadium: Embdena-Stadion; Attendance: 3,200; Referee: Kai Voss (Großhansdorf)

25 August 2000	Tennis Borussia Berlin	1 – 3	Arminia Bielefeld	Berlin
	Cornelius 90'	Report (in German)	Aračić 25'; Porcello 33'; Labbadia 66'	Stadium: Mommsenstadion; Attendance: 1,300; Referee: Babak Rafati (Hannover)

26 August 2000	TuS Dassendorf	0 – 5	SpVgg Unterhaching	Dassendorf
		Report (in German)	Rraklli 19'; Straube 21', 66'; Hirsch 64'; Breitenreiter 81'	Attendance: 2,000; Referee: Torsten Koop (Lüttenmark)

26 August 2000	SSV Reutlingen	2 – 3 (a.e.t.)	Hertha BSC	Reutlingen
	Djappa 57' (pen.), 62'	Report (in German)	Preetz 8'; Wosz 54'; Konstantinidis 93'	Stadium: Stadion an der Kreuzeiche; Attendance: 9,400; Referee: Alfons Berg (Konz)

26 August 2000	Karlsruher SC (A)	0 – 2	Alemannia Aachen	Karlsruhe
		Report (in German)	Zernicke 32'; Diané 71'	Stadium: Wildparkstadion, Platz 2 Attendance: 700; Referee: Peter Lange (Filderstadt)

26 August 2000	FC Ismaning	0 – 4	Borussia Dortmund	Munich
		Report (in German)	Ricken 13'; Reina 53'; Herrlich 66', 87'	Attendance: 7,000; Referee: Volker Wezel (Tübingen)

26 August 2000	FC Schönberg 95	0 – 4	Bayern Munich	Schönberg
		Report (in German)	Scholl 30' (pen.); Zickler 43'; Fink 51'; Jancker 90'	Attendance: 16,000; Referee: Lutz Michael Fröhlich (Berlin)

26 August 2000	SV Babelsberg 03	1 – 6	VfL Bochum	Potsdam
	Küntzel 47'	Report (in German)	Peschel 13'; Buckley 26'; Baştürk 41'; Weber 63', 85', 87'	Stadium: Karl-Liebknecht-Stadion; Attendance: 3,200; Referee: Florian Meyer (Burgdorf)

26 August 2000	Werder Bremen (A)	0 – 1	VfL Wolfsburg	Wolfsburg
		Report (in German)	Sebescen 64'	Stadium: Weserstadion, Platz 11; Attendance: 1,600; Referee: Jürgen Jansen (Essen)

26 August 2000	Tennis Borussia Berlin (A)	0 – 2	Werder Bremen	Berlin
		Report (in German)	Herzog 70'; Bogdanović 90'	Stadium: Mommsenstadion NR1; Attendance: 1,100; Referee: Hartmut Strampe (Handorf)

26 August 2000	VfB Stuttgart (A)	6 – 1	Eintracht Frankfurt	Stuttgart
	Vaccaro 16'; Schmiedel 35'; Vujević 50' (pen.), 67'; Amanatidis 78', 90'	Report (in German)	Fjørtoft 39'	Stadium: Gottlieb-Daimler-Stadion; Attendance: 1,700; Referee: Jörg Keßler (Höhenkirchen)

26 August 2000	Wuppertaler SV	1 – 3	VfB Stuttgart	Wuppertal
	Kipre 85'	Report (in German)	Ganea 30', 38', 87'	Stadium: Stadion am Zoo; Attendance: 10,000; Referee: Kemmerling (Hannover)

26 August 2000	1. FC Saarbrücken	0 – 1	SpVgg Greuther Fürth	Saarbrücken
		Report (in German)	Ruman 77'	Stadium: Ludwigsparkstadion; Attendance: 4,000; Referee: Jürgen Aust (Cologne)

26 August 2000	LR Ahlen	1 – 2	Borussia Mönchengladbach	Ahlen
	Bamba 30'	Report (in German)	Zimmermann 26' (o.g.); Van Houdt 86'	Stadium: Wersestadion; Attendance: 10,300; Referee: Thomas Frank (Hannover)

26 August 2000	1. FC Union Berlin	2 – 0	Rot-Weiss Oberhausen	Berlin
	Fährmann 6'; Isa 83'	Report (in German)		Stadium: Alte Försterei; Attendance: 3,500; Referee: Christian Schößling (Leipzig)

26 August 2000	FC Teningen	0 – 3	MSV Duisburg	Teningen
		Report (in German)	Milovanović 7'; Zeyer 80'; Közle 82'	Attendance: 2,000; Referee: Markus Schmidt (Stuttgart)

26 August 2000	SV Wehen	2 – 1	Stuttgarter Kickers	Taunusstein
	Mehić 7', 9'	Report (in German)	Dörflinger 52'	Stadium: Stadion am Halberg; Attendance: 1,000; Referee: Jürgen Kreyer (Hilden)

27 August 2000	1. FC Magdeburg	5 – 2	1. FC Köln	Magdeburg
	Zani 3'; Hannemann 13'; Papić 49', 54'; Ofodile 86'	Report (in German)	Scherz 11'; Springer 62'	Stadium: Ernst-Grube-Stadion; Attendance: 8,000; Referee: Wolfgang Stark (Ergolding)

27 August 2000	TSV Rain am Lech	0 – 7	Schalke 04	Rain am Lech
		Report (in German)	Sand 3'; Oude Kamphuis 18'; Möller 38'; Asamoah 63', 80', 86'; Mulder 84'	Attendance: 6,000; Referee: Knut Kircher (Rottenburg)

27 August 2000	VfB Lübeck	2 – 2 (a.e.t.) (3–2 p)	SV Waldhof Mannheim	Lübeck
	Harf 26'; Dengel 103'	Report (in German)	Protzel 49'; Vata 97'	Stadium: Lohmühle; Attendance: 4,100; Referee: Frank Minkowski (Hanstedt)
	Penalties
	Bärwolf (penalty scored); Homola (penalty scored); Völzke (penalty missed); Kullig (penalty scored)		Ćatić (penalty scored); Protzel (penalty missed); Santos (penalty missed); Vincze (penalty scored); Vata (penalty missed)

27 August 2000	VfL Hamm/Sieg	0 – 6	Energie Cottbus	Hamm
		Report (in German)	Horváth 14', 37', 43'; Akrapović 16', 63'; Micevski 73'	Attendance: 1,200; Referee: Thorsten Kinhöfer (Herne)

27 August 2000	Erzgebirge Aue	0 – 3	Hamburger SV	Aue
		Report (in German)	Ketelaer 30'; Mahdavikia 53'; Heinz 88'	Stadium: Erzgebirgsstadion; Attendance: 13,500; Referee: Helmut Fleischer (Ulm)

27 August 2000	Fortuna Köln	0 – 4	Bayer Leverkusen	Cologne
		Report (in German)	Brdarić 8'; Kovač 30'; Rink 87', 90'	Stadium: Südstadion; Attendance: 4,500; Referee: Peter Sippel (Munich)

27 August 2000	SC Paderborn	1 – 2	Hansa Rostock	Paderborn
	Berhorst 2'	Report (in German)	Kovacec 64'; Wibran 87'	Stadium: Hermann-Lons-Stadion; Attendance: 3,500; Referee: Peter Gagelmann (Bremen)

27 August 2000	SC Pfullendorf	1 – 3	SC Freiburg	Pfullendorf
	Stojko 88'	Report (in German)	Iashvili 61', 62'; Kobiashvili 85'	Attendance: 6,400; Referee: Hermann Albrecht (Kaufbeuren)

27 August 2000	TSG Pfeddersheim	0 – 7	1860 München	Pfeddersheim
		Report (in German)	Max 10', 53'; Riedl 62'; Pfuderer 64'; Cerny 77'; Agostino 85', 90'	Attendance: 3,000; Referee: Edgar Steinborn (Sinzig)

29 August 2000	Kickers Offenbach	0 – 4	1. FC Kaiserslautern	Offenbach
		Report (in German)	Ramzy 38'; Lokvenc 41'; Pettersson 53'; Basler 76'	Stadium: Stadion am Bieberer Berg; Attendance: 16,000; Referee: Herbert Fandel (Kyllburg)

=== Second round ===
31 October 2000	SV Wehen	0 – 1 (a.e.t.)	Borussia Dortmund	Taunusstein
		Report (in German)	Herrlich 92'	Stadium: Stadion am Halberg; Attendance: 12,000; Referee: Peter Gagelmann (Bremen)

31 October 2000	Karlsruher SC	1 – 0	Hamburger SV	Karlsruhe
	Nagorny 70'	Report (in German)		Stadium: Wildparkstadion; Attendance: 25,000; Referee: Peter Sippel (Munich)

31 October 2000	Alemannia Aachen	1 – 2	Bayer Leverkusen	Aachen
	Xie 68'	Report (in German)	Ramelow 13'; Brdarić 71'	Stadium: Tivoli; Attendance: 20,300; Referee: Bernd Heynemann (Magdeburg)

31 October 2000	1. FC Nürnberg	4 – 0	Mainz 05	Nuremberg
	Möckel 18', 41'; Driller 22'; Beliakov 76'	Report (in German)		Stadium: Frankenstadion; Attendance: 7,000; Referee: Kemmerling (Hannover)

31 October 2000	Arminia Bielefeld	0 – 4	VfL Bochum	Bielefeld
		Report (in German)	Marić 4'; Schindzielorz 59'; Baştürk 61'; Peschel 77'	Stadium: Bielefelder Alm; Attendance: 8,900; Referee: Lutz Wagner (Kriftel)

31 October 2000	SC Freiburg	1 – 0	Werder Bremen	Freiburg
	Sellimi 90'	Report (in German)		Stadium: Dreisamstadion; Attendance: 10,000; Referee: Jürgen Aust (Cologne)

1 November 2000	1. FC Union Berlin	1 – 0	SpVgg Greuther Fürth	Berlin
	Isa 37' (pen.)	Report (in German)		Stadium: Alte Försterei; Attendance: 3,100; Referee: Detlef Scheppe (Wenden)

1 November 2000	VfB Stuttgart (A)	0 – 3	VfB Stuttgart	Stuttgart
		Report (in German)	Tiffert 9'; Endress 33'; Amanatidis 83'	Stadium: Robert-Schlienz-Stadion; Attendance: 4,000; Referee: Florian Meyer (Burgdorf)

1 November 2000	VfB Lübeck	1 – 1 (a.e.t.) (3–5 p)	MSV Duisburg	Lübeck
	Kruppke 60'	Report (in German)	Güvenisik 66'	Stadium: Lohmühle; Attendance: 5,200; Referee: Michael Weiner (Giesen)
	Penalties
	Kullig (penalty missed); Homola (penalty scored); Rinal (penalty scored); Schultz (penalty scored)		Zeyer (penalty scored); Seidel (penalty scored); Drsek (penalty scored); Kovačecić (penalty scored); Milovanović (penalty scored)

1 November 2000	SSV Ulm 1846	2 – 0	Energie Cottbus	Ulm
	Rösler 52'; Leandro 90'	Report (in German)		Stadium: Donaustadion; Attendance: 5,500; Referee: Lutz Michael Fröhlich (Berlin)

1 November 2000	Hannover 96	2 – 1	Hansa Rostock	Hannover
	Lala 3'; Stefulj 74'	Report (in German)	Arvidsson 54'	Stadium: Niedersachsenstadion; Attendance: 18,000; Referee: Hermann Albrecht (Kaufbeuren)

1 November 2000	Borussia Mönchengladbach	5 – 1	1. FC Kaiserslautern	Mönchengladbach
	Nielsen 23'; Van Lent 43', 45'; Demo 84'; Auer 87'	Report (in German)	Pettersson 6'	Stadium: Bökelberg; Attendance: 24,100; Referee: Franz-Xaver Wack (Biberbach)

1 November 2000	SpVgg Unterhaching	1 – 2 (a.e.t.)	1860 München	Munich
	Garcia 41'	Report (in German)	Beierle 89'; Agostino 119'	Stadium: Stadion am Sportpark; Attendance: 13,000; Referee: Alfons Berg (Konz)

1 November 2000	FC St. Pauli	1 – 3 (a.e.t.)	Schalke 04	Hamburg
	Meggle 44'	Report (in German)	Böhme 8'; Büskens 111'; Sand 114'	Stadium: Millerntor-Stadion; Attendance: 20,800; Referee: Jörg Keßler (Höhenkirchen)

1 November 2000	VfL Wolfsburg	3 – 1	Hertha BSC	Wolfsburg
	Akpoborie 9'; O'Neil 30'; Nowak 83'	Report (in German)	Beinlich 20'	Stadium: VfL-Stadion; Attendance: 8,400; Referee: Helmut Fleischer (Ulm)

1 November 2000	1. FC Magdeburg	1 – 1 (a.e.t.) (4–2 p)	Bayern Munich	Magdeburg
	Ofodile 66'	Report (in German)	Salihamidžić 79'	Stadium: Ernst-Grube-Stadion; Attendance: 26,000; Referee: Jürgen Jansen (Essen)
	Penalties
	Schmidt (penalty scored); Ivanović (penalty scored); Golombek (penalty scored); Hannemann (penalty scored)		Paulo Sérgio (penalty scored); Jeremies (penalty missed); Giovane Élber (penalty missed); Sagnol (penalty scored)

=== Round of 16 ===
28 November 2000	1. FC Union Berlin	4 – 2	SSV Ulm 1846	Berlin
	Isa 30', 44'; Đurković 73'; Persich 81'	Report (in German)	Scharinger 26'; Leandro 75' (pen.)	Stadium: Alte Försterei; Attendance: 3,500; Referee: Jörg Keßler (Höhenkirchen)

28 November 2000	1. FC Magdeburg	5 – 3 (a.e.t.)	Karlsruher SC	Magdeburg
	Maslej 33', 77'; Hannemann 90'; Scholze 95'; Mydlo 117'	Report (in German)	Grimm 17'; Weis 44' (pen.); Nagorny 78'	Stadium: Ernst-Grube-Stadion; Attendance: 8,600; Referee: Peter Gagelmann (Bremen)

28 November 2000	VfL Wolfsburg	1 – 1 (a.e.t.) (3–4 p)	MSV Duisburg	Wolfsburg
	Akonnor 120'	Report (in German)	Milovanović 116'	Stadium: VfL-Stadion; Attendance: 5,000; Referee: Peter Sippel (Munich)
	Penalties
	Marić (penalty scored); Rische (penalty missed); Akonnor (penalty missed); Weiser (penalty scored); Thomsen (penalty scored)		Kovačević (penalty scored); Wedau (penalty scored); Seidel (penalty missed); Drsek (penalty scored); Milovanović (penalty scored)

29 November 2000	SC Freiburg	3 – 2	Bayer Leverkusen	Freiburg
	Kobiashvili 34' (pen.); Kehl 36'; Dorn 78'	Report (in German)	Ponte 23'; Kirsten 74'	Stadium: Dreisamstadion; Attendance: 18,000; Referee: Alfons Berg (Konz)

29 November 2000	1860 München	0 – 5	VfL Bochum	Munich
		Report (in German)	Buckley 32'; Baştürk 69'; Rietpietsch 75', 89'; Drinčić 81'	Stadium: Olympiastadion; Attendance: 10,000; Referee: Michael Weiner (Giesen)

29 November 2000	Borussia Mönchengladbach	1 – 0	1. FC Nürnberg	Mönchengladbach
	Van Lent 51'	Report (in German)		Stadium: Bökelberg; Attendance: 16,400; Referee: Lutz Wagner (Kriftel)

29 November 2000	VfB Stuttgart	2 – 1	Hannover 96	Stuttgart
	Dundee 7'; Balakov 56' (pen.)	Report (in German)	Šimák 52'	Stadium: Gottlieb-Daimler-Stadion; Attendance: 4,500; Referee: Wolfgang Stark (Ergolding)

29 November 2000	Schalke 04	2 – 1	Borussia Dortmund	Gelsenkirchen
	Sand 6'; Van Kerckhoven 42'	Report (in German)	Reina 3'	Stadium: Parkstadion; Attendance: 58,400; Referee: Franz-Xaver Wack (Biberbach)

=== Quarter-finals ===
20 December 2000	VfB Stuttgart	2 – 1 (a.e.t.)	SC Freiburg	Stuttgart
	Balakov 29'; Ganea 95'	Report (in German)	Kehl 31'	Stadium: Gottlieb-Daimler-Stadion; Attendance: 13,000; Referee: Jürgen Jansen (Essen)

20 December 2000	MSV Duisburg	0 – 1	Borussia Mönchengladbach	Duisburg
		Report (in German)	Van Lent 67' (pen.)	Attendance: 27,800; Referee: Hellmut Krug (Gelsenkirchen)

20 December 2000	1. FC Union Berlin	1 – 0	VfL Bochum	Berlin
	Ernemann 90'	Report (in German)		Stadium: Alte Försterei; Attendance: 11,000; Referee: Markus Merk (Otterbach)

20 December 2000	1. FC Magdeburg	0 – 1	Schalke 04	Magdeburg
		Report (in German)	Böhme 34' (pen.)	Stadium: Ernst-Grube-Stadion; Attendance: 26,700; Referee: Hermann Albrecht (Kaufbeuren)

=== Semi-finals ===
6 February 2001	1. FC Union Berlin	2 – 2 (a.e.t.) (4–2 p)	Borussia Mönchengladbach	Berlin
	Đurković 27'; Menze 80'	Report (in German)	Van Lent 61', 67'	Stadium: Alte Försterei; Attendance: 18,100; Referee: Helmut Fleischer (Ulm)
	Penalties
	Teixeira (penalty scored); Menze (penalty scored); Đurković (penalty scored); Nikol (penalty scored)		Van Lent (penalty missed); Eberl (penalty missed); Hausweiler (penalty scored); Aidoo (penalty scored)

7 February 2001	VfB Stuttgart	0 – 3	Schalke 04	Stuttgart
		Report (in German)	Sand 3'; Asamoah 6'; Mpenza 18'	Stadium: Gottlieb-Daimler-Stadion; Attendance: 26,700; Referee: Alfons Berg (Konz)

=== Final ===
26 May 2001
19:30 CEST

Union Berlin	0–2	Schalke 04
	Report	Böhme 53', 58' (pen.)

Olympiastadion, Berlin
Attendance: 73,011
Referee: Hermann Albrecht (Kaufbeuren)
