= 2004–05 Regionalliga =

11th season of the Regionalliga as a third-level league

Regionalliga
- Season: 2004–05
- Promoted: Eintracht Braunschweig; SC Paderborn 07; Kickers Offenbach; Sportfreunde Siegen
- Relegated: KFC Uerdingen 05; Borussia Dortmund II; VfL Wolfsburg II; Arminia Bielefeld II; 1. FC Union Berlin; 1. SC Feucht; 1. FSV Mainz 05 II; FC Nöttingen

The 2004–05 Regionalliga season was the eleventh season of the Regionalliga at tier three of the German football league system. It was contested in two geographical divisions with eighteen teams in the south and nineteen in the north. The champions, Eintracht Braunschweig and Kickers Offenbach, and the runners-up, SC Paderborn 07 and Sportfreunde Siegen, of every division were promoted to the 2. Bundesliga.

== Team movements ==
=== Promoted to 2. Bundesliga ===
==== From Nord ====
- Rot-Weiss Essen
- 1. FC Dynamo Dresden

==== From Süd ====
- Rot-Weiß Erfurt
- 1. FC Saarbrücken^{1}

^{1}1. FC Saarbrücken were promoted due to FC Bayern Munich II being a reserve side which are barred from promotion to the 2. Bundesliga.

=== Teams Relegated from 2. Bundesliga ===
==== To Nord ====
- VfB Lübeck
- 1. FC Union Berlin
- VfL Osnabrück

==== To Süd ====
- Jahn Regensburg

=== Teams relegated to Oberliga ===
==== From Nord ====
- SG Wattenscheid 09
- FC Schalke 04 II
- Sachsen Leipzig
- VfR Neumünster

==== From Süd ====
- 1. FC Schweinfurt 05
- 1. FC Eschborn
- 1. FC Kaiserslautern II

=== Teams Promoted from Oberliga ===
==== To Nord ====
- Arminia Bielefeld II(Oberliga Westfalen Champions)
- Hertha BSC II(Oberliga NOFV-Nord Champions)
- VfL Wolfsburg II(Oberliga Niedersachsen/Bremen Champions)

==== To Süd ====
- SV Darmstadt 98(Hessenliga Champions)
- FC Nöttingen(Oberliga Baden-Württemberg Champions)
- TSV 1860 Munich II(Bayernliga Champions)
- TuS Koblenz(Oberliga Südwest Champions)

== Regionalligas ==
=== Regionalliga Nord ===
==== Table ====
Pos	Team	Pld	W	D	L	GF	GA	GD	Pts	Promotion or relegation
1	Eintracht Braunschweig (C, P)	36	20	10	6	59	35	+24	70	Promotion to 2. Bundesliga
2	SC Paderborn 07 (P)	36	20	10	6	63	40	+23	70	Promotion to 2. Bundesliga
3	VfB Lübeck	36	20	9	7	62	20	+42	69	
4	VfL Osnabrück	36	18	13	5	67	44	+23	67	
5	Wuppertaler SV	36	15	9	12	46	48	−2	54	
6	Hamburger SV II	36	16	5	15	49	48	+1	53	
7	FC St. Pauli	36	13	13	10	43	39	+4	52	
8	Fortuna Düsseldorf	36	12	13	11	46	42	+4	49	
9	KFC Uerdingen 05 (Note: KFC Uerdingen 05 withdrew due to serious financial troubles and were relegated to the Oberliga thus sparing Chemnitzer FC from Relegation) (R)	36	13	10	13	43	50	−7	49	Relegation to Oberliga
10	Holstein Kiel	36	14	6	16	54	46	+8	48	
11	Preußen Münster	36	12	10	14	52	58	−6	46	
12	1. FC Köln II	36	12	10	14	58	65	−7	46	
13	Hertha BSC II	36	12	11	13	55	57	−2	47	
14	Werder Bremen II	36	11	9	16	48	57	−9	42	
15	Chemnitzer FC	36	10	10	16	33	38	−5	40	
16	Borussia Dortmund II (R)	36	10	10	16	57	64	−7	40	Relegation to Oberliga
17	VfL Wolfsburg II (R)	36	7	13	16	37	58	−21	34	Relegation to Oberliga
18	Arminia Bielefeld II (R)	36	7	8	21	50	83	−33	29	Relegation to Oberliga
19	1. FC Union Berlin (R)	36	6	9	21	32	50	−18	27	Relegation to Oberliga

Source: Weltfussball.de
Rules for classification: 1) points; 2) goal difference; 3) number of goals scored.
(C) Champions; (P) Promoted; (R) Relegated

==== Top scorers ====
Pos	Player	Team	Goals
1	(Turkey) Ahmet Kuru	Eintracht Braunschweig	24
2	(Italy) Giovanni Federico	1. FC Köln II	20
2	(Germany) Thomas Reichenberger	VfL Osnabrück	20
3	(Germany) Alexander Löbe	SC Paderborn 07	17
4	(Italy) Markus Feldhoff	VfL Osnabrück	16
5	(Germany) Mustafa Kucukovic	Hamburger SV II	14
5	(Germany) Markus Kullig	VfB Lübeck	14
5	(Bosnia and Herzegovina) Sejad Salihović	Hertha BSC II	14
6	(Turkey) Mahir Sağlık	Borussia Dortmund II	13
7	(United States) Ryan Coiner	1. FC Union Berlin	12
7	(Germany) Dustin Heun	KFC Uerdingen 05	12
7	(Germany) Sven Kretschmer	Hertha BSC II	12
8	(Germany) Daniel Graf	Eintracht Braunschweig	11
8	(Germany) Lars Kampf	VfB Lübeck	11
8	(Germany) Tobias Schweinsteiger	VfB Lübeck	11

Source=Weltfussball.de

=== Regionalliga Süd ===
==== Table ====
Pos	Team	Pld	W	D	L	GF	GA	GD	Pts	Promotion or relegation
1	Kickers Offenbach (C, P)	34	21	4	9	62	36	+26	67	Promotion to 2. Bundesliga
2	Sportfreunde Siegen (P)	34	18	10	6	52	29	+23	64	Promotion to 2. Bundesliga
3	SV Wehen	34	19	6	9	55	38	+17	63	
4	FC Augsburg	34	17	10	7	62	36	+26	61	
5	SV Darmstadt 98	34	16	6	12	50	33	+17	54	
6	Bayern Munich II	34	14	10	10	51	38	+13	52	
7	TSG Hoffenheim	34	14	8	12	57	49	+8	50	
8	Jahn Regensburg	34	13	9	12	47	46	+1	48	
9	Stuttgarter Kickers	34	12	11	11	48	43	+5	47	
10	SV 07 Elversberg	34	11	11	12	45	55	−10	44	
11	TuS Koblenz	34	10	13	11	43	38	+5	43	
12	VfR Aalen	34	12	7	15	41	59	−18	43	
13	VfB Stuttgart II	34	12	5	17	39	44	−5	41	
14	1. SC Feucht (Note: SC Pfullendorf were spared from relegation due to 1. SC Feucht declaring insolvency and withdrawing from the league) (R)	34	12	6	16	42	49	−7	42	Relegation to Oberliga
15	TSV 1860 Munich II	34	11	7	16	39	44	−5	40	
16	SC Pfullendorf	34	11	3	20	36	64	−28	36	
17	1. FSV Mainz 05 II (R)	34	8	9	17	29	46	−17	33	Relegation to Oberliga
18	FC Nöttingen (R)	34	3	7	24	29	83	−54	16	Relegation to Oberliga

Source: Weltfussball.de
Rules for classification: 1) points; 2) goal difference; 3) number of goals scored.
(C) Champions; (P) Promoted; (R) Relegated

==== Top scorers ====
Pos	Player	Team	Goals
1	(Germany) Patrick Helmes	Sportfreunde Siegen	21
2	(Germany) Vitus Nagorny	SV 07 Elversberg	18
3	(Germany) Mark Römer	FC Augsburg	17
4	(Germany) Suat Türker	Kickers Offenbach	16
5	(Germany) Mario Gomez	VfB Stuttgart II	15
5	(Germany) Sascha Maier	SC Pfullendorf	15
6	(Bosnia and Herzegovina) Suad Rahmanovic	Stuttgart Kickers	14
7	(Hungary) Laszlo Kanyuk	Kickers Offenbach	13
7	(Nigeria) Christian Okpala	FC Augsburg	13
8	(Germany) Nicky Adler	TSV 1860 Munich II	12
8	(Germany) Danko Boskovic	SV Wehen	12
8	(North Macedonia) Sasa Ciric	Kickers Offenbach	12
9	(Germany) Nico Beigang	SV Darmstadt 98	11
9	(Senegal) Miguel Coulibaly	VfR Aalen	11

Source=Weltfussball.de
