= List of VfB Lübeck players =

VfB Lübeck is a German professional football team formed in 1919. Throughout its history the club's first team has competed in various national and international competitions. All players who have played in 50 or more such matches are listed below.

== Key ==
- Players with name in **bold** currently play for the club.
- Years are the first and last calendar years in which the player appeared in competitive first-team football for the club.
- League appearances and goals comprise those in the Bundesliga, 2. Bundesliga, 3. Liga and the Regionalliga.
- Total appearances and goals comprise those in the Bundesliga, 2. Bundesliga, 3. Liga, Regionalliga, DFB-Pokal, and several now-defunct competitions.

== Players with 50 or more appearances ==
Appearances and goals are for first-team competitive matches only. Substitute appearances are included. Statistics are correct as of 1 January 2011.

Position key: GK – Goalkeeper; DF – Defender; MF – Midfielder; FW – Forward

Name	Nationality	Position	VfB Lübeck career	League Appearances	League Goals	Total Appearances	Total Goals	Notes
Daniel Bärwolf	Germany	FW	1998–2005	183	85	?	?	
Holger Behnert	Germany	DF	1995–1997	57	3	?	?	
Deniz Doğan	Turkey	DF	2004–2007	102	9	?	?	
**Marcel Gebers**	Germany	MF	2008–	77	12	?	?	
André Golke	Germany	MF	1995–1997	60	3	?	?	
Hendrik Helmke	Germany	MF	2008–2010	51	0	?	?	
**Bastian Henning**	Germany	FW	2008–	78	28	?	?	
Jan Hoffmann	Germany	MF	2005–2007	56	10	?	?	
Torben Hoffmann	Germany	MF	1995–1997	54	1	?	?	
Daniel Jurgeleit	Germany	FW	1995–1997	67	19	?	?	
Lars Kindgen	Germany	FW	1995–1997	50	1	?	?	
Dennis Kruppke	Germany	FW	2000–2003; 2007	98	24	?	?	
Markus Kullig	Germany	MF	2000–2001; 2002–2007	204	39	?	?	
Marco Laaser	Germany	DF	2002–2006	86	1	?	?	
Romas Mažeikis	Lithuania	DF	1995–1997	51	0	?	?	
Farai Mbidzo	Zimbabwe	MF	2001–2006	118	4	?	?	
Reiner Plaßhenrich	Germany	MF	2002–2004	58	3	?	?	
Jakob Sachs	Germany	FW	2008–2010	65	17	?	?	
Jens Scharping	Germany	FW	2001–2004	86	29	?	?	
Tobias Schweinsteiger	Germany	MF	2004–2006; 2007–2008	58	20	?	?	
**Nourreddine Semghoun**	Germany	GK	2008–	60	0	?	?	
Ibrahim Türkmen	Germany	MF	1995–1996; 2000–2008	200	11	?	?	
Felix van der Steen	Netherlands	MF	1995–1997	58	2	?	?	
Maik Wild	Germany	GK	1995–1997; 2001–2004	148	0	?	?	
Ramazan Yıldırım	Turkey	MF	1998–2001	80	4	?	?	
Ferydoon Zandi	Iran	MF	2002–2004	54	20	?	?	
