= 2001–02 1. FC Kaiserslautern season =

1. FC Kaiserslautern
2001–02 season
- Manager: Andreas Brehme
- Stadium: Fritz-Walter-Stadion
- Bundesliga: 7th
- DFB-Pokal: Quarter-finals
- Top goalscorer: Miroslav Klose (16)

During the 2001–02 German football season, 1. FC Kaiserslautern competed in the Bundesliga.

== Season summary ==
Kaiserslautern rose one place in the table to 7th, securing a return to European football through the Intertoto Cup.

== Players ==
=== First-team squad ===
Squad at end of season

Note: Flags indicate national team as defined under FIFA eligibility rules; some limited exceptions apply. Players may hold more than one non-FIFA nationality.

| No. | Pos. | Nation | Player |
|---|---|---|---|
| 1 | GK | GER | Georg Koch |
| 3 | DF | CZE | Petr Gabriel |
| 4 | DF | SVN | Aleksander Knavs |
| 5 | DF | GER | Thomas Hengen |
| 6 | DF | EGY | Hany Ramzy |
| 7 | MF | BUL | Marian Hristov |
| 8 | MF | GRE | Dimitrios Grammozis (Note: Grammozis was born in Wuppertal, West Germany (now Germany), but also qualified to represent Greece internationally through his parents and represented Greece at U-21 level.) |
| 9 | FW | CZE | Vratislav Lokvenc |
| 10 | MF | BRA | Lincoln |
| 11 | FW | GER | Olaf Marschall |
| 12 | GK | GER | Roman Weidenfeller |
| 13 | MF | GER | Thomas Riedl |
| 15 | MF | CRO | Nenad Bjelica |
| 17 | MF | BRA | Ratinho |
| 18 | FW | SWE | Jörgen Pettersson |

| No. | Pos. | Nation | Player |
|---|---|---|---|
| 19 | MF | GER | Markus Kullig |
| 20 | DF | POL | Tomasz Kłos |
| 21 | DF | LUX | Jeff Strasser |
| 22 | MF | GER | Andreas Buck |
| 23 | MF | GER | Silvio Adzic |
| 24 | DF | GER | Harry Koch |
| 25 | FW | GER | Miroslav Klose (Note: Klose was born in Opole, Poland, but was raised in Germany from the age of 8 and made his international debut for Germany in March 2001.) |
| 26 | MF | GER | Torsten Reuter |
| 28 | MF | GER | Stefan Malz |
| 30 | MF | GER | Mario Basler |
| 32 | MF | POR | José Dominguez |
| 33 | FW | GER | Danko Bošković |
| 34 | FW | MLT | Michael Mifsud |
| 40 | FW | YUG | Perica Ognjenović |

=== Left club during season ===
Note: Flags indicate national team as defined under FIFA eligibility rules; some limited exceptions apply. Players may hold more than one non-FIFA nationality.

| No. / Pos. / Nation / Player; 14 / MF / FRA / Youri Djorkaeff (to Bolton Wanderers) | No. / Pos. / Nation / Player; 16 / DF / NGA / Taribo West (released) |

== Competitions ==
Win Draw Loss Postponed

=== Bundesliga ===
==== League table ====
| Pos | Team | Pld | W | D | L | GF | GA | GD | Pts | Qualification or relegation |
|---|---|---|---|---|---|---|---|---|---|---|
| 5 | Schalke 04 | 34 | 18 | 7 | 9 | 52 | 36 | +16 | 61 | Qualification to UEFA Cup first round |
| 6 | Werder Bremen | 34 | 17 | 5 | 12 | 54 | 43 | +11 | 56 | Qualification to UEFA Cup first round |
| 7 | 1. FC Kaiserslautern | 34 | 17 | 5 | 12 | 62 | 53 | +9 | 56 | Qualification to Intertoto Cup third round |
| 8 | VfB Stuttgart | 34 | 13 | 11 | 10 | 47 | 43 | +4 | 50 | Qualification to Intertoto Cup second round |
| 9 | 1860 Munich | 34 | 15 | 5 | 14 | 59 | 59 | 0 | 50 | Qualification to Intertoto Cup second round |

Source: bundesliga.de
Rules for classification: 1) points; 2) goal difference; 3) number of goals scored.

=== DFB-Pokal ===
| 25 August 2001 1 | BW Brühl | 1–4 | 1. FC Kaiserslautern | Brühl |
| | Morig 18' (pen.) | Report (in German) | Lokvenc 28', 44'; Knavs 42'; Lincoln 89' | Attendance: 6,500; Referee: Günter Perl (Munich) |

| 28 November 2001 2 | Waldhof Mannheim | 2–3 | 1. FC Kaiserslautern | Mannheim |
| | Teber 11', 53' | Report (in German) | Ramzy 27'; Lokvenc 42'; Marschall 90' | Attendance: 21,100; Referee: Franz-Xaver Wack (Biberbach) |

| 11 December 2001 Round of 16 | Mainz 05 | 2–3 | 1. FC Kaiserslautern | Mainz |
| | Babatz 71'; N'Kufo 84' (pen.) | Report (in German) | Lokvenc 23'; Lincoln 31', 42' | Stadium: Bruchwegstadion; Attendance: 15,500; Referee: Jürgen Aust (Cologne) |

| 30 January 2002 Quarter-final | 1. FC Kaiserslautern | 0–0 (a.e.t.) (3–5 p) | Bayern Munich | Kaiserslautern |
| | | Report (in German) | | Stadium: Betzenberg; Attendance: 37,600; Referee: Jürgen Jansen (Essen) |
| | Penalties |
| | Koch (penalty scored); Hengen (penalty scored); Bjelica (penalty missed); Hristov (penalty scored) | | Effenberg (penalty scored); Jeremies (penalty scored); Hargreaves (penalty scored); Scholl (penalty scored); Pizarro (penalty scored) |
