= Robert Wulnikowski =

Polish-German footballer

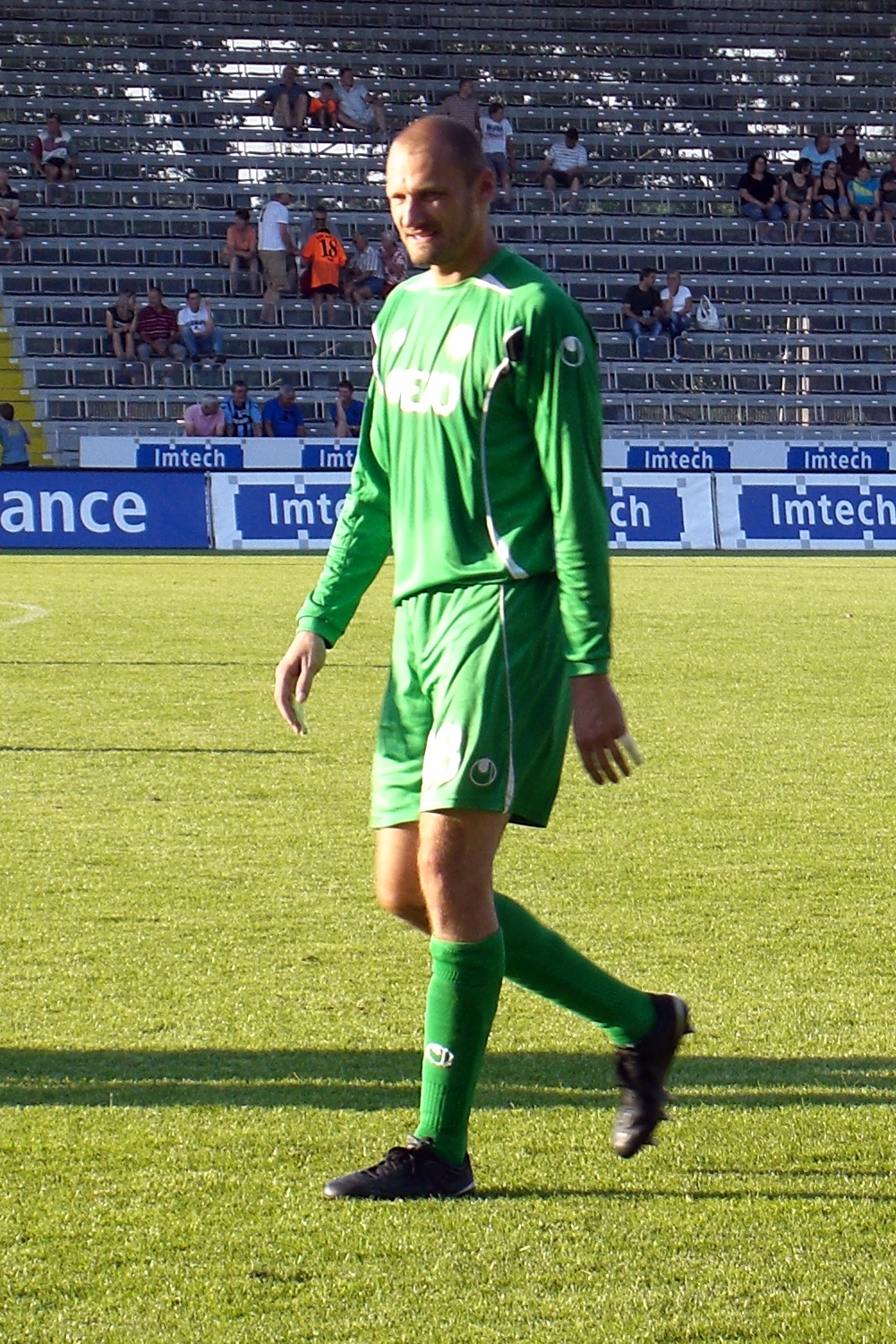
- Wulnikowski with Kickers Offenbach in 2010

Personal information
- Full name: Robert Wulnikowski
- Date of birth: 11 July 1977 (age 49)
- Place of birth: Bydgoszcz, Poland
- Height: 1.92 m (6 ft 4 in)
- Position: Goalkeeper

Team information
- Current team: FC Ingolstadt (goalkeeping coach)

Youth career
- –1990: Zawisza Bydgoszcz
- 1990–1997: Schalke 04

Senior career*
Years	Team	Apps	(Gls)
1997–1999	Schalke 04 II		
1999–2004	Union Berlin	54	(0)
2004–2005	Rot-Weiss Essen	2	(0)
2005–2007	VfR Aalen	59	(0)
2007–2008	Sportfreunde Siegen	29	(0)
2008–2013	Kickers Offenbach	182	(0)
2014	RB Leipzig II	10	(0)
2014–2017	Würzburger Kickers	95	(0)
- * Club domestic league appearances and goals

Robert Wulnikowski (born 11 July 1977) is a Polish-German former professional footballer who played as a goalkeeper. He is currently the goalkeeping coach of FC Ingolstadt.

== Career ==
Born in Bydgoszcz, Wulnikowski began with football in his hometown at the Polish club Zawisza Bydgoszcz. In 1990, he entered the youth division of the FC Schalke 04. In 1997, he was promoted to the second team of the club and played in the Oberliga Westfalen. In 1999, he joined the third division team 1. FC Union Berlin. At Union, Wulnikowski was initially a back-up goalkeeper behind Kay Wehner until his departure in 2000, and Sven Beuckert until 2002. In 2001, Union was promoted to the 2. Bundesliga without Wulnikowski playing a single league match. In the 2000–01 DFB-Pokal quarter-final against VfL Bochum, Wulnikowski came on after 30 minutes for an injured Beuckert. Union Berlin won that match and succeeded in reaching the final (lost 0–2 against Schalke 04). After the dismissal of longtime coach Georgi Vasilev in October 2002 and the appointment of Mirko Votava, Wulnikowski became first-choice goalkeeper for Union. By the end of the 2003–04 season, after the club finished second-last and was relegated, Wulnikowski had completed a total of 54 second-division games for the club.

Wulnikowski then moved to Rot-Weiss Essen for an undisclosed fee. At the beginning of the season, Wulnikowski was in the starting squad, but made an error in the first match. From matchday three onwards, coach Jürgen Gelsdorf replaced him with René Renno. At the end of the season, Rot-Weiss was relegated, and the contract with the goalkeeper cancelled.

In 2005, Wulnikowski subsequently joined VfR Aalen in the Regionalliga Süd. He completed two seasons as first-choice goalkeeper there. In April 2007, Wulnikowski announce his move to league rivals Sportfreunde Siegen. During the 2007–08 season, he was first-choice goalkeeper for Siegen.

At the beginning of the 2008–09 season, he moved to the third division club Kickers Offenbach. In the 2009–10 winter break, he extended his contract for another three years until the end of the 2012–13 season.

On 27 October 2010, he became nationwide famous for his fantastic match in the 2010–11 DFB-Pokal against Borussia Dortmund, in which he saved two penalties and saving multiple of Dortmund's other good goal opportunities. Offenbach won the match 4–2 after a penalty shootout and moved on to round three. He left Offenbach at the end of the 2012–13 season, after they were relegated from the 3. Liga. After six months without a club, he signed for RB Leipzig II for half a season, before joining Würzburger Kickers in July 2014. In June 2017, Wulnikowski ended his professional career and became goalkeeping coach for Würzburger.
