= Germany at the 2002 FIFA World Cup =

This article concerns the Germany national football team at the 2002 FIFA World Cup in South Korea and Japan.

== Qualification ==
Germany had to play against England, Finland, Albania and Greece, managed by fellow German Otto Rehhagel.

The start was promising with four wins in a row, including a 1-0 win against England at Wembley. Since England could only manage a draw away at Finland, automatic qualification should have been a foregone conclusion. In the next game, there was a 2-2 draw against Finland, which was ironed out by winning away in Albania. In the following game, a draw against England would have seen Germany qualify automatically from this match.

After six minutes, Germany took the lead with a goal by Carsten Jancker but England soon equalised with a Michael Owen goal. From that point on in the match, it seemed like England could do no wrong and what wrong was inconsequential for Germany to make up the point difference. Germany did not offer anything on the break and the final score was for England, 5-1. Automatic qualification was pushed back.

The last match of qualifying saw Germany play Finland and simultaneously England play Greece. Germany was hoping for the Greeks to give them a helping hand, by at least drawing with England. Greece led until the 90th minute, when David Beckham equalised from a free kick. If Germany had won, then they would have finished first and with that qualified automatically to the World Cup finals. However, Germany only managed a 0-0 draw and therefore finished in second place.

That meant that Germany had to play a play-off game and drew Ukraine. On 10 November 2001, the two teams played out a 1-1 draw, which was played in Kyiv. Four days later, Germany finally qualified for the World Cup by winning 4-1. After only 15 minutes, Germany were leading the match 3-0.

The result of a England loss to Germany there followed by the latter being inundated by criticism, and they would not automatically qualify for a berth at the upcoming World Cup. Supporters of Germany said that the combative nature of the Germans makes them competitive. The convincing result against Ukraine was celebrated as a rebirth for German football.

Date	Venue	Match	Result	Goals
02/09/2000	Hamburg	Germany v Greece	2-0 (1-0)	1-0 Deisler (17th), 2-0 Ouzounidis, o.g. (75th)
07/10/2000	London	England v Germany	0-1 (0-1)	0-1 D Hamann (14th)
24/03/2001	Leverkusen	Germany v Albania	2-1 (1-1)	1-0 Deisler (50th), 1-1 Kola (66th), 2-1 Klose (88th)
28/03/2001	Athens	Greece v Germany	2-4 (2-2)	0-1 Rehmer (6th), 1-1 Charisteas (21st), 1-2 Ballack, p. (25th), 2-2 Georgiadis (43rd), 2-3 Klose (82nd), 2-4 Bode (90+)
02/06/2001	Helsinki	Finland v Germany	2-2 (2-0)	1-0 Forssell (29th), 2-0 Forssell (43rd), 2-1 Ballack, p. (69th), 2-2 Jancker (72nd)
06/06/2001	Tirana	Albania v Germany	0-2 (0-1)	0-1 Rehmer (28th), 0-2 Ballack (68th)
01/09/2001	Munich	Germany v England	1-5 (1-2)	1-0 Jancker (6th), 1-1 Owen (12th), 1-2 Gerrard (45th), 1-3 Owen (48th), 1-4 Owen (66th), 1-5 Heskey (74th)
06/10/2001	Gelsenkirchen	Germany v Finland	0-0	

Play-offs

Date	Venue	Match	Result	Goals
10/11/2001	Kyiv	Ukraine v Germany	1-1 (1-1)	1-0 Subow (18th), 1-1 Ballack (31st)
14/11/2001	Dortmund	Germany v Ukraine	4-1 (3-0)	1-0 Ballack (4th), 2-0 Neuville (11th), 3-0 Rehmer (15th), 4-0 Ballack (51st), 4-1 Shevchenko (90th)

Group 9 Final Table

Pos	Country	F/A	Pts
1	England	16-6	17
2	Germany	14-10	17
3	Finland	12-7	12
4	Greece	7-17	7
5	Albania	5-14	3

== Finals ==
=== Squad ===
Number / Name		Team	Birth Day	Caps/Goals (Total)	Caps	Goals	Red Cards	2nd Yellows	Yellow Gards
Goalkeepers
23	Hans-Jörg Butt	Bayer 04 Leverkusen	28.05.1974	2 (0)	0	0	0	0	0
1	Oliver Kahn	FC Bayern München	15.06.1969	45 (0)	7	0	0	0	1
12	Jens Lehmann	Borussia Dortmund	10.11.1969	14 (0)	0	0	0	0	0
Defence
4	Frank Baumann	Werder Bremen	29.11.1975	11 (2)	1	0	0	0	1
2	Thomas Linke	FC Bayern München	26.12.1969	34 (0)	7	1	0	0	0
21	Christoph Metzelder	Borussia Dortmund	05.11.1980	6 (0)	7	0	0	0	0
5	Carsten Ramelow	Bayer 04 Leverkusen	20.03.1974	25 (0)	5	0	0	1	0
3	Marko Rehmer	Hertha BSC	19.04.1972	27 (4)	1	0	0	0	0
6	Christian Ziege	Tottenham Hotspur	01.12.1972	66 (9)	5	0	0	0	2
Midfield
13	Michael Ballack	Bayer 04 Leverkusen	26.09.1976	22 (6)	6	3	0	0	3
18	Jörg Böhme	FC Schalke 04	22.01.1974	6 (1)	0	0	0	0	0
22	Torsten Frings	Werder Bremen	22.11.1976	8 (2)	7	0	0	0	1
8	Dietmar Hamann	FC Liverpool	27.08.1973	40 (4)	6	0	0	0	2
16	Jens Jeremies	FC Bayern München	05.03.1974	33 (1)	7	0	0	0	1
15	Sebastian Kehl	Borussia Dortmund	13.02.1980	8 (2)	2	0	0	0	1
10	Lars Ricken	Borussia Dortmund	10.07.1976	16 (1)	0	0	0	0	0
17	Marco Bode	Werder Bremen	23.07.1969	34 (8)	6	1	0	0	0
19	Bernd Schneider	Bayer 04 Leverkusen	17.11.1973	9 (0)	7	1	0	0	1
Attack
14	Gerald Asamoah	FC Schalke 04	03.10.1978	11 (2)	3	0	0	0	0
20	Oliver Bierhoff	AS Monaco	01.05.1968	65 (36)	5	1	0	0	0
9	Carsten Jancker	FC Bayern München	28.08.1974	26 (7)	3	1	0	0	1
11	Miroslav Klose	1. FC Kaiserslautern	09.06.1978	12 (8)	7	5	0	0	1
7	Oliver Neuville	Bayer 04 Leverkusen	01.05.1973	30 (3)	6	1	0	0	1
Trainer
	Rudi Völler (Manager)		13.04.1960
	Michael Skibbe (Coach)		04.08.1965

Germany at the 2002 FIFA World Cup (South Korea)
Germany at the 2002 FIFA World Cup (Japan)

=== Group stages ===
At the draw for the "group stages", it was announced that Germany would be in Pot A, meaning they became joint favourites to win the tournament. The three-time world champions saw them meet Ireland, Cameroon and Saudi Arabia in the group stage.

Against Saudi Arabia, everything went according to plan, with Germany winning 8-0. Miroslav Klose scored a hat-trick against the Minnows. Carsten Jancker scored his first goal after enduring a dry run. It was Germany's highest win since the 1978 World Cup, where they beat Mexico 6-0. In the game against Ireland, Germany took an early lead, with Klose scoring once more but in added time Robbie Keane equalised for Ireland. That meant that if Germany could either beat or draw with Cameroon in their last group game, would see Germany qualify for the second round. At half-time in the game against Cameroon, the score was 0-0, but Germany had Carsten Ramelow sent off for a second yellow card offence. It did not look good for Germany, who were under pressure from Cameroon right from the start of the second hand. Substitute Marco Bode then opened the scoring for Germany, assisted by a wonderful pass from Klose and made the score 1-0. Bode's goal was voted goal of the month for June 2002 by the viewers of Sportschau. Cameroon, trained by fellow German Winfried Schäfer, also had a man sent off midway through the second half. From this moment, Germany took control and Klose made it 2-0 shortly after. Germany finished the group top.

Matches

Date	Match	Result
01/06/2002	Germany v Saudi Arabia	8-0 (4-0)
06/06/2002	Germany v Ireland	1-1 (1-0)
11/06/2002	Cameroon v Germany	0-2 (0-0)

Final Group E Table

Pos	Team	F/A	Pts
1	Germany	11-1	7
2	Ireland	5-2	5
3	Cameroon	2-3	4
4	Saudi Arabia	0-12	0

=== Knock-out Rounds ===
2nd Round	Germany v Paraguay	1-0 (0-0)	Neuville (88th)
Quarters	Germany v USA	1-0 (0-0)	Ballack (39th)
Semis	Germany v South Korea	1-0 (0-0)	Ballack (75th)
Final	Brazil v Germany	2-0 (0-0)	

== See also ==
- Germany at the FIFA World Cup
