= Kay Wehner =

German former professional footballer (born 1971)

Personal information
- Date of birth: 12 July 1971 (age 55)
- Place of birth: Eisenhüttenstadt, East Germany
- Position: Goalkeeper

Youth career
- 1981–1985: Aufbau Eisenhüttenstadt
- 1985–1990: Stahl Eisenhüttenstadt

Senior career*
Years	Team	Apps	(Gls)
1990–1995	Stahl Eisenhüttenstadt		
1995–1999	Energie Cottbus	72	(0)
1999–2001	Union Berlin	33	(0)
2001–2007	Wacker Burghausen	87	(0)
- * Club domestic league appearances and goals

Kay Wehner (born 12 July 1971) is a German former professional footballer who played as a goalkeeper.

== Career ==
Wehner began his career with his hometown club, Stahl Eisenhüttenstadt, and was on the fringes of a team that reached the final of the last ever East German Cup, losing to Hansa Rostock but qualifying for the 1991–92 Cup Winners' Cup because Rostock were also league champions. Stahl qualified for the third tier of German football, the NOFV-Oberliga Nord, and it was at this level that Wehner made his first-team breakthrough. He helped the club qualify for the new Regionalliga Nordost in 1994, before leaving for Energie Cottbus a year later.

Wehner began as backup to Antonio Ananiev, but took over as first-choice when Ananiev joined 1. FC Köln early in the 1996–97 season, a season that would prove to be the best of Wehner's career. Cottbus won the Regionallihga Nordost, and beat Hannover 96 in a playoff to earn promotion to the 2. Bundesliga. They also reached the DFB-Pokal final, losing against Bundesliga side VfB Stuttgart.

Wehner was ever-present in Cottbus's first season in the second division, but suffered a cruciate ligament injury in the summer of 1998 which saw him lose his place to the new arrival, Tomislav Piplica. Wehner returned to the Regionalliga Nordost, signing for 1. FC Union Berlin, where, despite the team winning the division, Wehner struggled for popularity, having replaced a club legend on Oskar Kosche. He missed the decisive penalty in a shoot-out in the promotion playoff against VfL Osnabrück, and Union would miss out on promotion to LR Ahlen in the final playoff round.

Union would earn promotion the following year, and match Cottbus's achievement in reaching the cup final, but Wehner had left the club by then, having been usurped by new signing Sven Beuckert he joined Regionalliga Süd club Wacker Burghausen in January 2001. In his second season with the club, Burghausen won the Regionalliga Süd and promotion to the 2. Bundesliga. He spent two seasons as first-choice at this level, before being replaced by the experienced Uwe Gospodarek in 2003. He had a brief run back in the team at the end of the 2003–04 season, this would be his last taste of first-team action, but he remained at Burghausen as a reserve goalkeeper until 2007.
