= Mustafa Kučuković =

German footballer

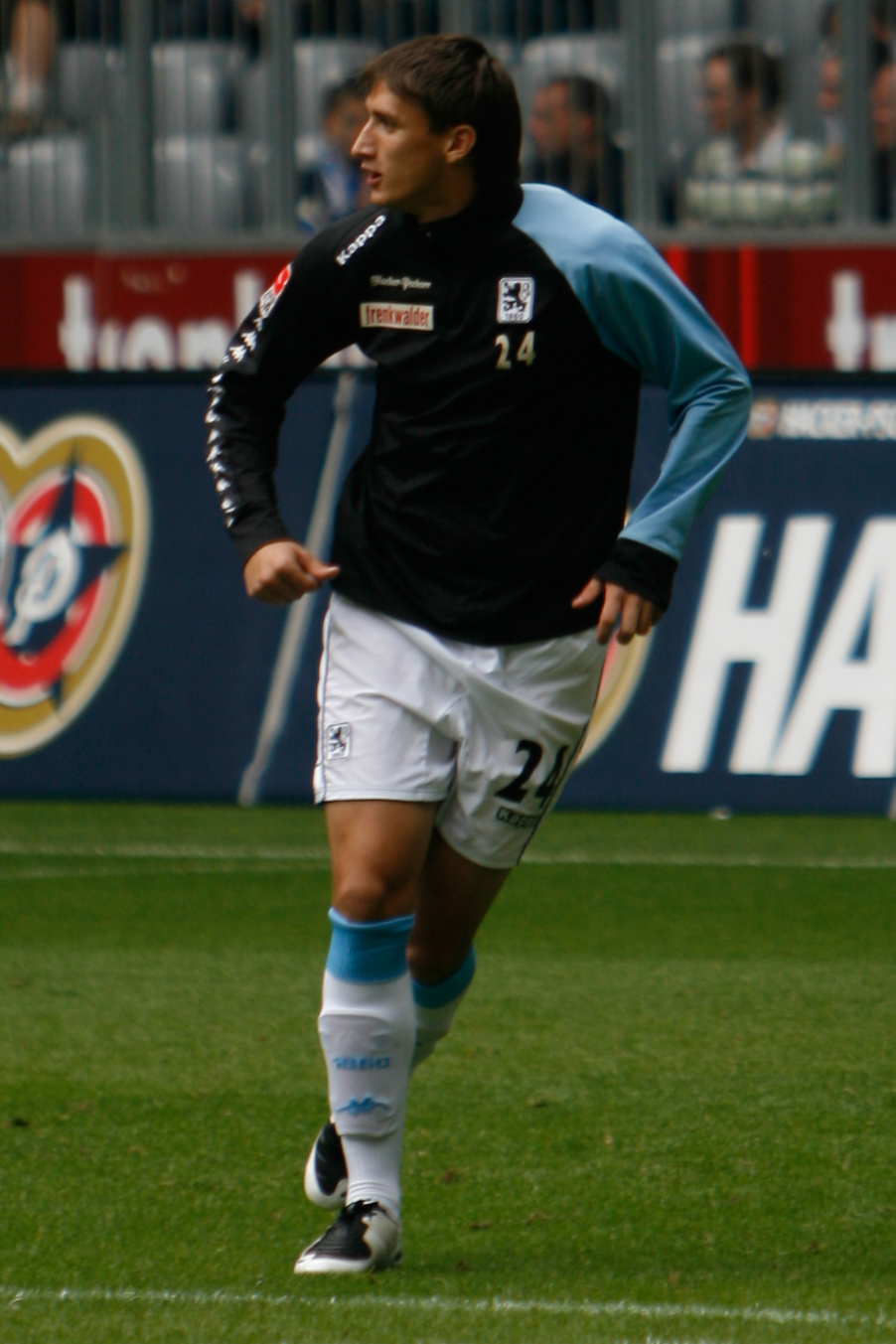
- Kučuković with 1860 Munich in 2007

Personal information
- Date of birth: 5 November 1986 (age 40)
- Place of birth: Bosanski Novi, SR Bosnia and Herzegovina, SFR Yugoslavia
- Height: 1.93 m (6 ft 4 in)
- Position: Forward

Youth career
- 1992–1997: SSV Buer
- 1997–2003: Schalke 04
- 2003–2004: VfL Bochum

Senior career*
Years	Team	Apps	(Gls)
2004–2007	Hamburger SV	14	(1)
2004–2007	Hamburger SV II	41	(22)
2006–2007	→ Greuther Fürth (loan)	21	(2)
2007–2008	1860 Munich	29	(4)
2007–2008	1860 Munich II	13	(4)
2009–2010	Grenoble	5	(0)
2010–2011	SønderjyskE	17	(4)
2011	Energie Cottbus	5	(1)
2011	Energie Cottbus II	1	(0)
2012	Olympiakos Nicosia	13	(2)
2013–2015	Hansa Rostock	30	(5)
2016–2017	Lüneburger SK Hansa	11	(0)
2017	Hamm United FC	7	(0)
Total		207	(45)

International career
2004–2005	Germany U19	9	(4)
2005–2007	Germany U20	5	(3)
2007	Germany U21	1	(0)
- * Club domestic league appearances and goals

Mustafa Kučuković (born 5 November 1986) is a former professional footballer who played as a forward.

== Club career ==
Kučuković started his professional career at Hamburger SV in September 2004 and made his Bundesliga debut as a second-half substitute in the club's away match against VfB Stuttgart on 11 September 2004. With an age of 17 years, 10 months and 6 days he was the youngest player who has ever played for Hamburger SV in Bundesliga then. Prior to his professional debut, he spent one season playing for VfL Bochum's amateur squad and was signed by HSV's amateur squad in July 2004. Between 2004 and 2006, he played regularly for HSV's amateurs in the Regionalliga Nord and only occasionally appeared for the club's professional squad in the Bundesliga, making 14 appearances and scoring one goal in two seasons. His first and so far only Bundesliga goal was the 1–1 equaliser that secured one point for HSV in an away match against Werder Bremen on 18 December 2005. He scored the goal only two minutes after entering the match as a substitute. Playing for HSV's amateur squad in the Regionalliga Nord, he made 40 appearances and scored 22 goals in two seasons. In the 2005–06 season, he also made three appearances for HSV in the UEFA Cup.

In August 2006, HSV loaned him to 2. Bundesliga side SpVgg Greuther Fürth for one season, until June 2007. He made his debut for the club in the Second Bundesliga on 27 August 2006 in their 3–1 defeat to Hansa Rostock at home, playing as a second-half substitute. After his return to Hamburg Kučuković was sold to another 2. Bundesliga side, 1860 Munich. after a year he left Munich. He joined on 30 January 2009 French club Grenoble Foot 38. On 31 March 2010, Grenoble Foot 38 released the German forward by mutual consent.

On 17 September 2010, he signed with SønderjyskE in the Danish Superliga. On 8 June 2011, he signed a contract with Energie Cottbus, but on 31 January 2012 he moved to the Cypriot club Olympiakos Nicosia.

On 12 July 2013, he joined Hansa Rostock on a two-year contract after having been sidelined for one year due to injuries.

== International career ==
Kučuković has played for Germany at the U-19, U-20 and U-21 level.

== Career statistics ==
Appearances and goals by club, season and competition
Club	Season	League			Cup		Continental		Total	
Club	Season	Division	Apps	Goals	Apps	Goals	Apps	Goals	Apps	Goals
Hamburger SV	2004–05	Bundesliga	9	0	0	0	0	0	9	0
Hamburger SV	2005–06	Bundesliga	5	1	1	0	4	0	10	1
Hamburger SV	Total		14	1	1	0	4	0	19	1
Hamburger SV II	2004–05	Regionalliga Nord	20	14	—		—		20	14
Hamburger SV II	2005–06	Regionalliga Nord	20	8	—		—		20	8
Hamburger SV II	2007–08	Regionalliga Nord	1	0	—		—		1	0
Hamburger SV II	Total		41	22	—		—		41	22
Greuther Fürth	2006–07	2. Bundesliga	21	2	2	0	—		23	2
1860 Munich	2007–08	2. Bundesliga	23	3	3	1	—		26	4
1860 Munich	2008–09	2. Bundesliga	6	1	1	1	—		7	2
1860 Munich	Total		29	4	4	2	—		33	6
1860 Munich II	2007–08	Regionalliga Süd	8	2	—		—		8	2
1860 Munich II	2008–09	Regionalliga Süd	5	2	—		—		5	2
1860 Munich II	Total		13	4	—		—		13	4
Grenoble	2008–09	Ligue 1	1	0	0	0	—		1	0
Grenoble	2009–10	Ligue 1	4	0	1	0	—		5	0
Grenoble	Total		5	0	1	0	—		6	0
SønderjyskE	2010–11	Danish Superliga	17	4	0	0	—		17	4
Energie Cottbus	2011–12	2. Bundesliga	5	1	1	0	—		6	1
Energie Cottbus II	2011–12	Regionalliga Nord	1	0	—		—		1	0
Olympiakos Nicosia	2011–12	Cypriot First Division	13	2	3	0	—		16	2
Hansa Rostock	2013–14	3. Liga	21	2	—		—		21	2
Hansa Rostock	2014–15	3. Liga	9	3	—		—		9	3
Hansa Rostock	Total		30	5	—		—		30	5
Lüneburger SK Hansa	2016–17	Regionalliga Nord	11	0	—		—		11	0
Career total			200	45	12	2	4	0	216	47
