= Musemestre Bamba =

Congolese footballer (born 1971)

Personal information
- Date of birth: 10 November 1971 (age 54)
- Place of birth: Kinshasa, DR Congo
- Height: 1.78 m (5 ft 10 in)
- Position: Midfielder

Senior career*
Years	Team	Apps	(Gls)
1993–1994	AS Vita Club		
1994–1995	Denizlispor	17	(1)
1996	VfB Hüls		
1996–2006	LR Ahlen	290	(49)
2006–2007	Rot Weiss Ahlen	24	(4)
2007–2008	SV Lippstadt	9	(6)
2008–2009	SC Verl	22	(3)
2009–2010	VfL Sassenberg		
2010	SG Telgte 1919		
2010–2012	SC Roland Beckum	58	(19)

International career
1994–2003	DR Congo	4	(0)
- * Club domestic league appearances and goals

Musemestre Bamba (born 10 November 1971) is a Congolese former professional footballer who played as a midfielder. He played professionally for Denizlispor in the Süper Lig and for LR Ahlen in the 2. Bundesliga.

== International career ==
Bamba played for the DR Congo national team, making four appearances with them.

== Personal life ==
Bamba is the father of the German footballer Samuel Bamba.
