= Daniel Ernemann =

German footballer and coach

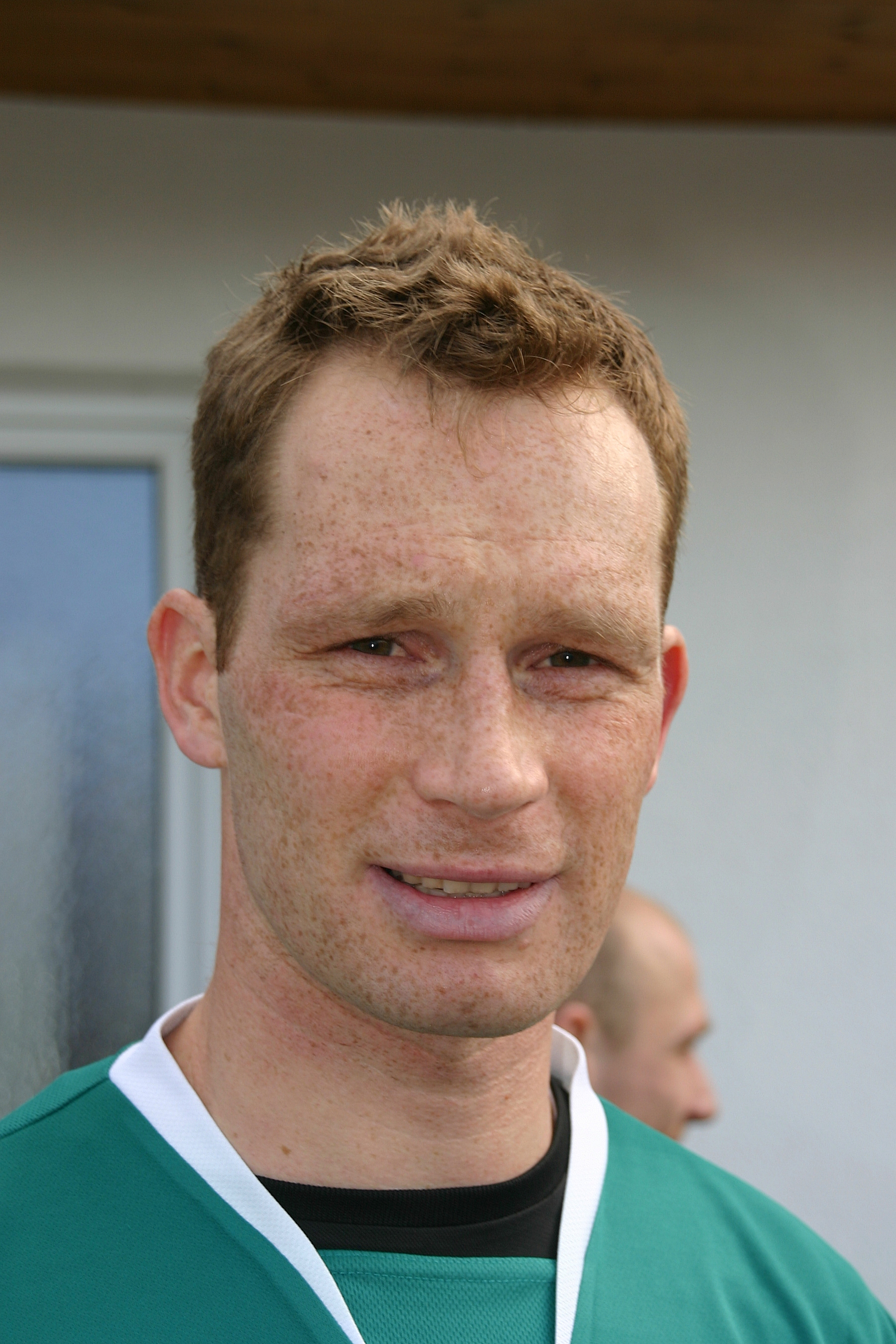
- Ernemann in 2009

Personal information
- Date of birth: 18 February 1976 (age 50)
- Place of birth: Amberg, West Germany
- Height: 1.92 m (6 ft 4 in)
- Position: Defender

Youth career
- 1. FC Amberg
- Holstein Kiel
- Quelle Fürth

Senior career*
Years	Team	Apps	(Gls)
1994–1997	Quelle Fürth	26	(0)
1997–1999	Bayern Munich (A)	31	(1)
1999	FC Augsburg	23	(1)
1999–2004	Union Berlin	126	(3)
2004–2006	Austria Lustenau	69	(7)
2006–2008	Dynamo Dresden	54	(2)
2008–2010	Austria Lustenau	59	(2)
Total		388	(16)

Managerial career
- 2010–2012: Austria Lustenau (assistant)
- 2015–2017: Austria Lustenau II
- 2017: Austria Lustenau (caretaker)
- 2017–: Austria Lustenau (assistant)
- * Club domestic league appearances and goals

Daniel Ernemann (born 18 February 1976) is a German football coach and a former player who played as a defender. He is an assistant coach with SC Austria Lustenau. Ernemann played for Quelle Fürth, FC Bayern Munich II, FC Augsburg, 1. FC Union Berlin, Dynamo Dresden and had two spells with SC Austria Lustenau.

== Honours ==
Union Berlin

- Regionalliga Nordost: 1999–2000
- DFB-Pokal: runner-up 2000–01
