= Gerald Asamoah =

German association football player (born 1978)

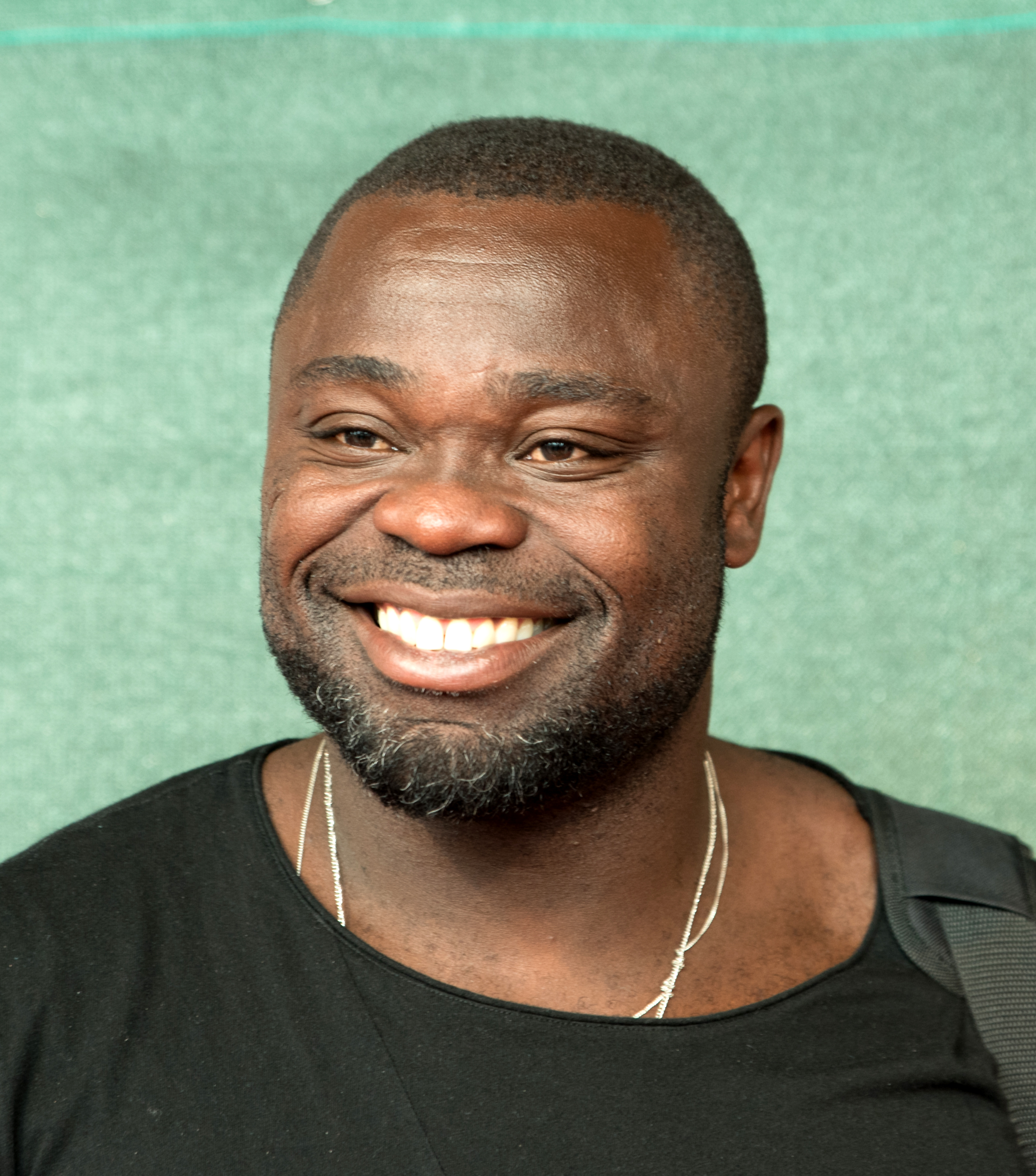
- Asamoah in 2016

Personal information
- Full name: Gerald Asamoah
- Date of birth: 3 October 1978 (age 48)
- Place of birth: Mampong, Ghana
- Height: 1.80 m (5 ft 11 in)
- Position: Forward

Youth career
- 1990: VfV Hainholz
- 1990–1991: SG Borken
- 1991–1994: BV Werder Hannover
- 1994–1996: Hannover 96

Senior career*
Years	Team	Apps	(Gls)
1996–1999	Hannover 96	79	(28)
1999–2010	Schalke 04	279	(44)
2004	Schalke 04 II	1	(0)
2010–2011	FC St. Pauli	27	(6)
2012–2013	Greuther Fürth	27	(5)
2013–2015	Schalke 04 II	49	(8)
Total		462	(91)

International career
2001–2006	Germany	43	(6)

Managerial career
- 2016–2021: Schalke 04 II
Medal record
Men's football
Representing Germany
FIFA World Cup
Runner-up	2002 Korea/Japan
Third place	2006 Germany
- * Club domestic league appearances and goals

Gerald Asamoah (German pronunciation: [ˈgeːʁalt ʔazaˈmoːa]; born 3 October 1978) is a German football executive and former professional player who works as the first-team manager of Schalke 04.

During his playing career, Asamoah played as a forward, and he was mainly known for his pace, his physical strength and his hard-working approach. He has bonded the most part of his career to Schalke, where he has been widely appreciated not only for his accomplishments as a player, but also for his relaxed and positive attitude and his role as a community leader off the pitch.

Asamoah kept working in Gelsenkirchen after his retirement, too, as he was offered several administrative and managerial roles throughout the years.

== Early life ==
Born in Mampong, Ghana, Asamoah and his family emigrated to Germany in 1990.

He immediately started playing football in several local teams, and entered the youth academy of Hannover 96 at the age of 16.

== Club career ==
=== Hannover 96 ===
Coming through the youth ranks of Hannover, Asamoah started his professional career with the club from Lower Saxony, scoring five goals in his debut season. He first came to prominence the following year, as he scored 19 goals in 33 games (including a decisive winner in the final match against Eintracht Braunschweig) to help Hannover reach the play-off for the promotion in 2. Bundesliga. Although Die Roten lost the first leg 2–0 against TeBe Berlin, in the second leg Asamoah netted the opener, as his side tied the aggregate and eventually gained promotion after the penalty shoot-outs. Adding his final season in Hannover, Asamoah played 79 games and scored 28 goals for the club.

=== Schalke 04 ===
In the summer transfer window of 1999, Asamoah moved to Schalke 04 for a reported cost of €1.35 million. Despite having rarely hit double figures again during his prolonged time in Gelsenkirchen, the forward instantaneously became a favorite of supporters, thanks to his qualities both on and off the pitch, his good relationship with team-mates and coaches (especially Huub Stevens, who managed Asamoah for three years at Schalke) and his contributions to the club's successes during the first half of the 2000s.

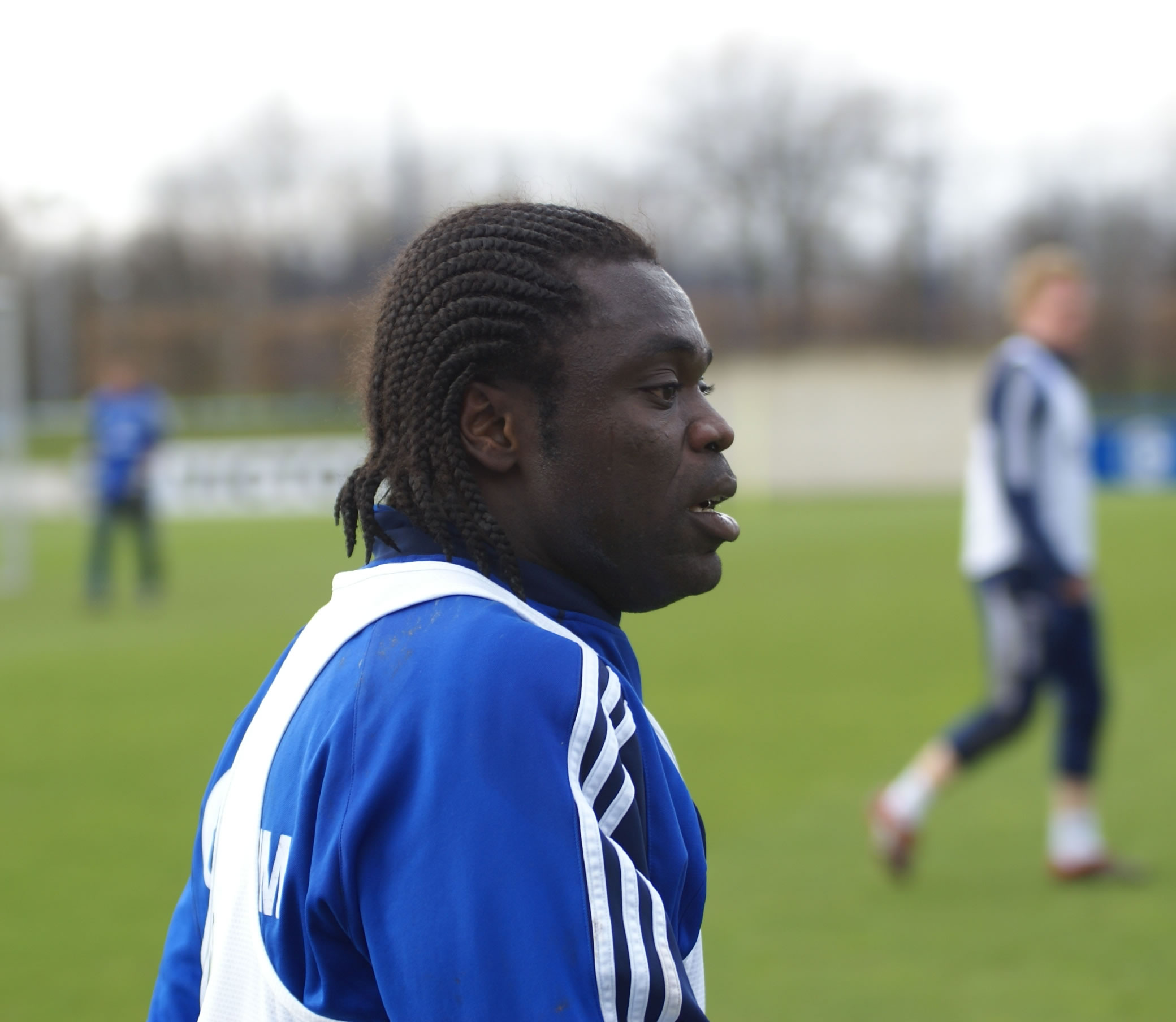
Asamoah training with Schalke 04 in March 2007

With Die Knappen, the Ghanaian-German striker reached the qualification to the UEFA Champions League at the end of the 2000–01 season, before winning two consecutive German Cups (in 2001 and 2002), two UEFA Intertoto Cups (in 2003 and 2004) and a German League Cup (in 2005).

Asamoah left Schalke at the end of the 2009-10 season, having registered a total of 381 games, 64 goals and 45 assists (between the national league, national cups and continental competitions) for the club over eleven years.

=== The last years as a player ===
==== St. Pauli ====
On 1 June 2010, Asamoah signed a two-year contract with the then Bundesliga-promoted club FC St. Pauli. During his time with the Kiezkicker, he played regularly and scored six goals in the league, including a winner that allowed his team to obtain their first away victory against cross-city rivals, Hamburger SV, since 1977. However, St. Pauli didn't manage to avoid relegation to the 2. Bundesliga, having finished last in the league, and the striker eventually decided to terminate this contract in June 2011.

==== Greuther Fürth ====
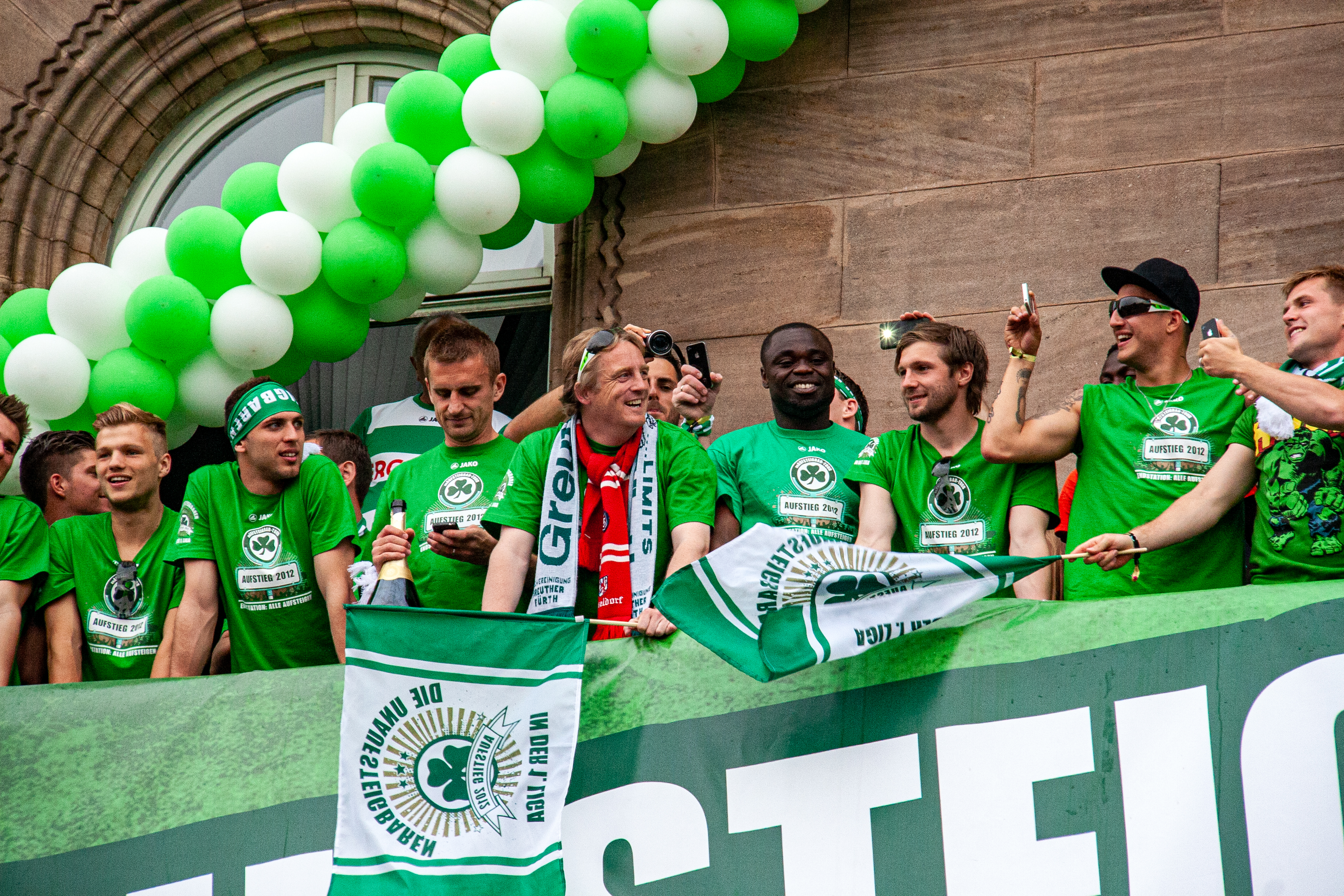
Asamoah celebrating Greuther Fürth's historical promotion in Bundesliga with his team-mates and head coach Mike Büskens in April 2012

After spending six months without a club and training with the non-professional side VfB Hüls to keep himself fit, Asamoah signed for Greuther Fürth on 10 January 2012. Come during the second half of the season, Asamoah mainly acted as a reserve of Christopher Nöthe and Olivier Occéan, but still helped the team win the 2. Bundesliga title, as Greuther Fürth achieved their historical first promotion to the Bundesliga.

However, the following year turned out to be more difficult than expected: Asamoah went goalless during the entire season, while the Kleeblätter finished at the bottom of the table, having won only four of their 34 league games, none of which were at home soil.

This was also Asamoah's last season in the Bundesliga, as he amassed the third highest number of substitutions ever in the league (139 times).

==== Return to Schalke and retirement ====
On 15 July 2013, it was announced that Asamoah would return to Schalke 04 as a player-coach for their reserve team.

Having taken part in one more game for the senior side during a DFB Pokal match in 2013, the striker played regularly in the Regionalliga West, before ultimately announcing his retirement in 2015.

== International career ==
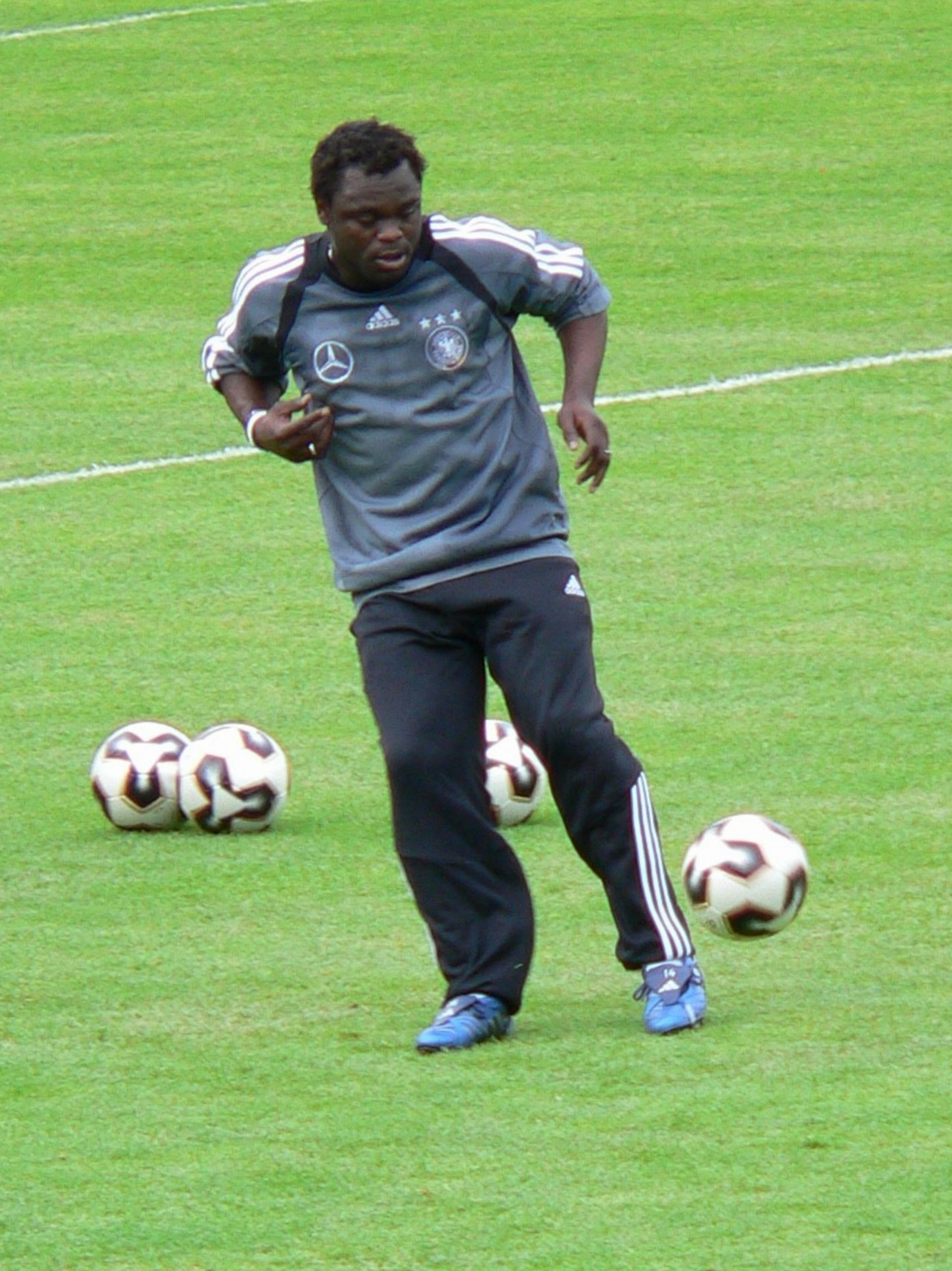
Asamoah training with the Germany national team in June 2005

In May 2001, Asamoah received his first senior call-up for the Germany national team by coach Rudi Völler and subsequently won his first international cap during a friendly match against Slovakia, making him the first African-born black player to ever play for the side: in fact, Erwin Kostedde and Jimmy Hartwig, two previous internationals with black ancestry, were both born in Germany to African-American fathers and German mothers. He also scored on his debut, at the 50th minute of the game.

He then went on to play in the 2002 and 2006 World Cups, mainly as a reserve, and ended up collecting a total amount of 43 international caps and six goals for the Germany national team.

== Managerial career ==
Having previously served as a supervisor for the marketing area at Schalke while he was still playing for their reserve team, Asamoah was offered a role as an assistant coach for the Royal Blues' U-15 squad immediately after his retirement, in July 2015. In October of the same year, he obtained his UEFA A coaching licence. In November 2016, he was appointed as head coach of Schalke's U23 squad, a role he maintained until February 2021. Meanwhile, he served as the team manager for the senior team between March and June 2019, as he was temporarily promoted by interim head coach Huub Stevens. In February 2021, following internal turbulence within the club due to the extreme lack of results throughout the season, Asamoah was appointed as a coordinator for the first team, acting as a link between the players, the coaching team and the board. However, Schalke could not prevent themselves from being relegated for the first time in over thirty years, as they finished at the bottom of the league table.

In May 2021, the new-established sporting director Rouven Schröder decided to appoint Asamoah as Schalke's first-team manager for the following season, in collaboration with head coach Dimitrios Grammozis.

== Personal life ==
Asamoah is married and has two children, twins born on 26 February 2007.

Asamoah's brother Lewis (born 1984) has played as a footballer, too, spending his whole career in the non-professional tiers of the German football league pyramid, while his cousin Emmanuel (born 1993) played in the youth ranks of St. Pauli and Hamburg before seemingly stepping out of football in 2013.

He suffers from a heart condition, named non-obstructive hypertrophic cardiomyopathy. In his case, the flesh lobe that separates the right and left heart chambers is extremely thick, which can cause an arrhythmic heartbeat. While this condition didn't hold him back entirely from playing, it was one of the main reasons behind his frequent struggles with fitness.

On 13 January 2016, Asamoah accepted the 2015 FIFA Fair Play Award on behalf of football organizations and clubs around the world, as he worked to support refugees in the face of conflict.

He has also been leading educational campaigns in public schools and speaking out against racism in several occasions. In August 2019, he openly criticized Schalke's chairman of the supervisory board, Clemens Tönnies, due to his controversial claims against African people during a convention on climate change and the future of the food industry in Paderborn: Tönnies eventually maintained his role within the club's board until his own resignment, almost a year after. In February 2020, Asamoah firmly condemned the racist insults directed towards opponent defender Jordan Torunarigha by Schalke supporters during a home cup match against Hertha BSC. In June 2020, Asamoah joined the group of players and board members across Bundesliga who reacted and manifested support to the protests across the United States and the world following the murder of George Floyd, saying quote: "If you have never experienced racism, you'll never find out what that truly means. It's a pain you carry inside yourself and you can't swallow it. I'll work even harder to visit schools and teach young people that we're all the same."

In 2021, he featured in Schwarze Adler, a documentary detailing the experiences of Black players in German professional football.

== Career statistics ==
=== Club ===
Appearances and goals by club, season and competition
Club	Season	League			DFB-Pokal		Europe (Note: Includes UEFA Champions League, UEFA Europa League)		Other		Total	
Club	Season	Division	Apps	Goals	Apps	Goals	Apps	Goals	Apps	Goals	Apps	Goals
Hannover 96	1996–97	Regionalliga Nord	25	5	1	0	–		2 (Note: Includes appearances in 2. Bundesliga playoffs)	0	28	5
Hannover 96	1997–98	Regionalliga Nord	33	19	3	0	–		2	1	38	20
Hannover 96	1998–99	2. Bundesliga	21	4	1	0	–		–		22	4
Hannover 96	Total		79	28	5	0	0	0	4	1	88	29
Schalke 04	1999–2000	Bundesliga	33	4	2	1	–		–		35	5
Schalke 04	2000–01	Bundesliga	29	4	6	4	–		–		35	8
Schalke 04	2001–02	Bundesliga	32	6	6	0	5	1	2 (Note: Appearances in DFL-Ligapokal)	0	45	7
Schalke 04	2002–03	Bundesliga	27	3	3	1	6	0	2	0	38	4
Schalke 04	2003–04	Bundesliga	24	4	0	0	4	0	6 (Note: Includes appearances in UEFA Intertoto Cup)	1	34	5
Schalke 04	2004–05	Bundesliga	31	8	5	1	7	1	6	2	49	12
Schalke 04	2005–06	Bundesliga	24	3	1	0	10	1	2	0	37	4
Schalke 04	2006–07	Bundesliga	13	2	1	2	2	0	–		16	4
Schalke 04	2007–08	Bundesliga	31	7	3	3	10	1	3	0	47	11
Schalke 04	2008–09	Bundesliga	27	2	2	0	7	1	–		36	3
Schalke 04	2009–10	Bundesliga	8	1	0	0	–		–		8	1
Schalke 04	Total		279	44	29	12	51	5	21	3	380	64
Schalke 04 II	2003–04	Regionalliga Nord	1	0	0	0	–		–		1	0
FC St. Pauli	2010–11	Bundesliga	27	6	0	0	–		–		27	6
Greuther Fürth	2011–12	2. Bundesliga	10	5	2	0	–		–		12	5
Greuther Fürth	2012–13	Bundesliga	17	0	1	0	–		–		18	0
Greuther Fürth	Total		27	5	3	0	0	0	0	0	30	5
Schalke 04	2013–14	Bundesliga	0	0	1	0	0	0	–		1	0
Schalke 04 II	2013-14	Regionalliga West	28	6	–		–		–		28	6
Schalke 04 II	2014-15	Regionalliga West	21	2	–		–		–		21	2
Schalke 04 II	Total		49	8	0	0	0	0	0	0	49	8
Career total			462	91	38	12	51	5	25	4	576	112

=== International ===
Appearances and goals by national team and year
National team	Year	Apps	Goals
Germany	2001	7	1
Germany	2002	10	1
Germany	2003	1	0
Germany	2004	7	1
Germany	2005	11	3
Germany	2006	7	0
Total		43	6

Scores and results list Germany's goal tally first, score column indicates score after each Asamoah goal.

List of international goals scored by Gerald Asamoah
No.	Date	Venue	Opponent	Score	Result	Competition
1	29 May 2001	Weserstadion, Bremen, Germany	Slovakia	1–0	2–0	Friendly
2	13 February 2002	Fritz-Walter-Stadion, Kaiserslautern, Germany	Israel	6–1	7–1	Friendly
3	21 December 2004	Rajamangala Stadium, Bangkok, Thailand	Thailand	4–1	5–1	Friendly
4	4 June 2005	Windsor Park, Belfast, Northern Ireland	Northern Ireland	1–1	4–1	Friendly
5	21 June 2005	Frankenstadion, Nuremberg, Germany	Argentina	2–1	2–2	2005 Confederations Cup
6	17 August 2005	De Kuip, Rotterdam, Netherlands	Netherlands	2–2	2–2	Friendly

== Honours ==
Schalke 04

- DFB-Pokal: 2000–01, 2001–02
- DFL-Ligapokal: 2005
- UEFA Intertoto Cup 2003, 2004

Greuther Fürth

- 2. Bundesliga: 2011–12

Germany

- FIFA World Cup runner-up: 2002; third place: 2006
- FIFA Confederations Cup third place: 2005
