= Ronny Nikol =

German footballer

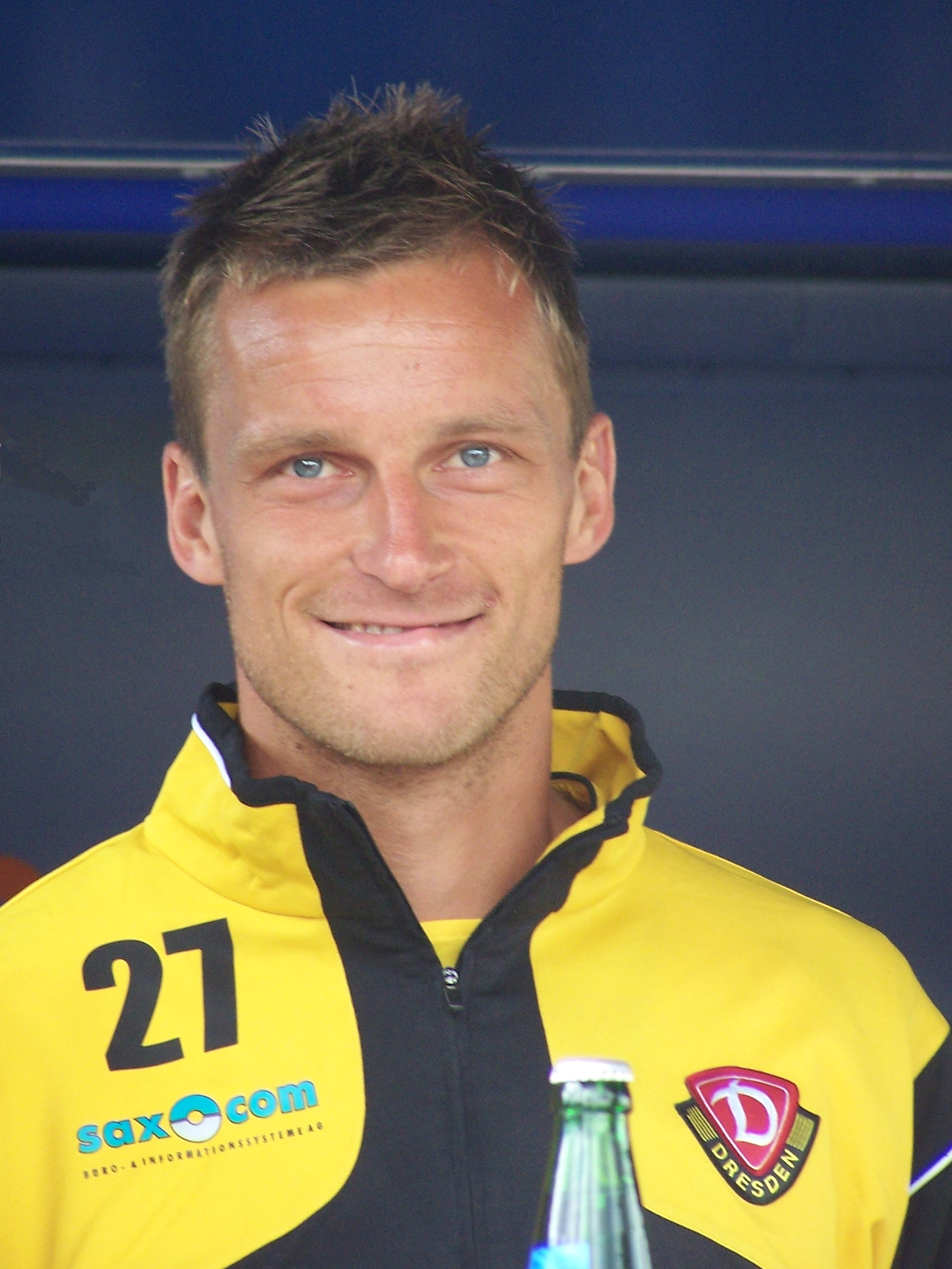
- Nikol with Dynamo Dresden

Personal information
- Date of birth: 11 July 1974 (age 52)
- Place of birth: East Berlin, East Germany
- Height: 1.80 m (5 ft 11 in)
- Position: Left wing-back

Youth career
- BSG EAW Treptow
- FC Berlin

Senior career*
Years	Team	Apps	(Gls)
1992–1995	FC Berlin	77	(5)
1995–1997	1. FC Nürnberg	11	(1)
1997–2003	Union Berlin	196	(11)
2003–2005	Energie Cottbus	39	(0)
2005–2007	Rot-Weiss Essen	30	(0)
2007–2010	Dynamo Dresden	83	(1)
2010–2011	Carl Zeiss Jena	36	(2)
2011–2012	Berliner AK 07	13	(2)
2012–2013	VSG Altglienicke	30	(0)
- * Club domestic league appearances and goals

Ronny Nikol (born 11 July 1974) is a German former professional footballer who played as a left wing-back.

Nikol originally wanted to by an athlete at SG Dynamo Adlershof. He only started playing football at the age of 16 at enterprise sports community BSG Elektro-Apparate-Werke Treptow. From there he moved to the youth department of BFC Dynamo.

Nikol made his first appearance with the first team of BFC Dynamo, then named FC Berlin, against SV Motor 09 Eberswalde in the 31st matchday of the 1991-92 NOFV-Oberliga on 17 May 1992. He then became regular player for FC Berlin the 1992-93 NOFV-Oberliga. Nikol left FC Berlin 1. FC Nürnberg after the 1994-95 season.

== Honours ==
- Regionalliga Süd (III): 1997
- Regionalliga Nord (III): 2001, 2006
- DFB-Pokal: Runner-up: 2000–01
