= Stadion am Halberg =

Stadium in Taunusstein, Germany

Coordinates: 50°09′36″N 8°11′02″E

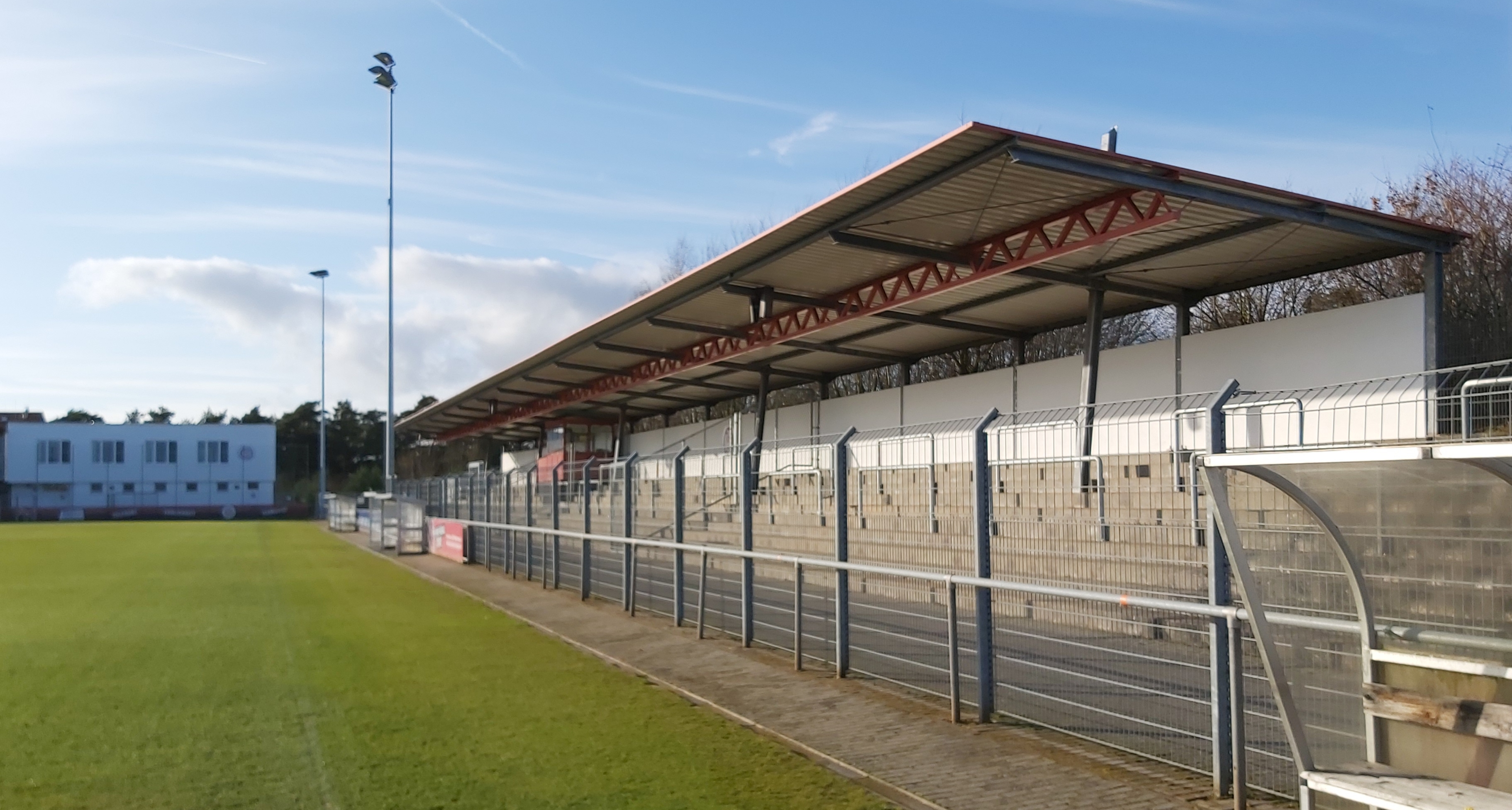
- View of the Stand
- Interactive map of Stadion am Halberg
- Location: Taunusstein, Germany
- Capacity: 5,000

Stadion am Halberg is a multi-use stadium in Taunusstein, Germany. It is the former home venue of the footballclub of SV Wehen, before the team moved to the newly built BRITA-Arena in Wiesbaden. The stadium has a capacity of 5,000 people, and is located on the Halberg, in the Wehen district of the town.

The stadium was used as the training base for the Ukraine National Football Team during Euro 2024.
