= Jens Tschiedel =

German footballer (born 1968)

Personal information
- Date of birth: 5 August 1968 (age 58)
- Place of birth: Wuppertal, West Germany
- Height: 1.88 m (6 ft 2 in)
- Position: Defender

Youth career
- ASV Wuppertal
- Bayer Leverkusen

Senior career*
Years	Team	Apps	(Gls)
1990–1991	Bayer Leverkusen II		
1991–1995	Alemannia Aachen		
1995–1999	FC Gütersloh	67	(4)
1999–2000	Rot Weiss Ahlen		
2000–2001	Union Berlin	25	(1)
2002	Wuppertaler SV II		
- * Club domestic league appearances and goals

Jens Tschiedel (born 5 August 1968, in Wuppertal) is a German professional footballer who played as a defender.

== Career ==
Born in Westphalia, Tschiedel began playing football in the Bayer Leverkusen reserves. He played in the 2. Bundesliga with FC Gütersloh and 1. FC Union Berlin, after helping Union Berlin gain promotion from the Regionalliga Nord.

== Honours ==
- DFB-Pokal finalist: 2001.
