= Steffen Menze =

German footballer (born 1969)

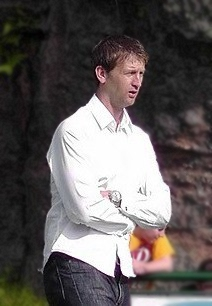
- Menze with Dresden in 2011

Personal information
- Date of birth: 28 January 1969 (age 57)
- Place of birth: Plauen, East Germany
- Height: 1.89 m (6 ft 2 in)
- Position: Defender

Youth career
- Stahl Eisenhüttenstadt
- –1989: Vorwärts Frankfurt

Senior career*
| Years | Team | Apps | (Gls) |
| 1989–1990 | Vorwärts Frankfurt | 9 | |
| 1990–1991 | Stahl Eisenhüttenstadt | 10 | (3) |
| 1991 | Banyasz Siófok | 8 | (0) |
| 1991–1992 | FC St. Pauli | 3 | (0) |
| 1992–1993 | 1. FC Pforzheim | 34 | (2) |
| 1993–1994 | VfR Pforzheim | 31 | (3) |
| 1994–1996 | Hannover 96 | 40 | (3) |
| 1996 | Eintracht Frankfurt | 10 | (1) |
| 1996–1998 | FSV Zwickau | 52 | (4) |
| 1998–2003 | Union Berlin | 149 | (37) |
| 2003–2004 | Kickers Offenbach | 13 | (2) |
| Total | | 359 | (55) |

Managerial career
- 2004–2006: Kickers Offenbach II
- 2006: Kickers Offenbach
- 2006–2007: Waldhof Mannheim
- 2008–2009: Kickers Offenbach II
- 2009–2010: Kickers Offenbach
- 2012: Dynamo Dresden (Interim)
- 2013: Dynamo Dresden (Interim)
- * Club domestic league appearances and goals

Steffen Menze (born 28 January 1969 in Plauen, East Germany) is a German football coach and former player.

== Honours ==
- DFB-Pokal runner-up: 2000–01
- NOFV-Pokal runner-up: 1990–91
