= Dirk Hannemann =

German footballer (born 1970)

Personal information
- Date of birth: 11 August 1970 (age 56)
- Place of birth: Dessau, East Germany
- Height: 1.83 m (6 ft 0 in)
- Position: Midfielder

Senior career*
Years	Team	Apps	(Gls)
–1992	Hallescher FC	9	(0)
1992–1994	MSV Duisburg		
1994–1995	Hansa Rostkck	3	(0)
1996	SV Ried	11	(2)
1996–1997	Tennis Borussia Berlin	14	(1)
1997–1998	FC Grün-Weiß Wolfen		
1998–2002	1. FC Magdeburg	106	(13)
2002	VfB Leipzig		
2003	MSV 90 Preussen		
2003–2004	VfB Leipzig		
2004–2008	MSV 90 Preussen		

Managerial career
- 2008–2009: MSV 90 Preussen
- * Club domestic league appearances and goals

Dirk Hannemann (born 11 August 1970) is a German former professional footballer who played as a midfielder. He made 11 appearances in the Austrian Bundesliga and 12 appearances in the 2. Bundesliga during his playing career.
