= Hendrik Völzke =

German footballer

Personal information
- Date of birth: 22 March 1975 (age 51)
- Place of birth: Germany
- Height: 1.87 m (6 ft 2 in)
- Position: Midfielder

Senior career*
Years	Team	Apps	(Gls)
1994–1996	Werder Bremen II		
1996–1997	Werder Bremen	1	(0)
1998–1999	VfB Oldenburg		
2000–2001	VfB Lübeck		
2001–2007	FC Schönberg		
2007–2008	Altona 93	28	(6)
- * Club domestic league appearances and goals

Hendrik Völzke (born 22 March 1975) is a German former professional footballer who played as a midfielder. He made his single Bundesliga appearance for Werder Bremen on 1 March 1997 in a 2–2 draw against VfB Stuttgart.
