= Antonio Ananiev =

Bulgarian footballer

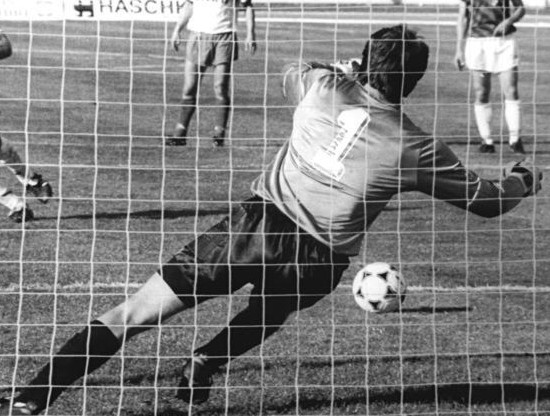
- Ananiev in 1990

Personal information
- Date of birth: 8 May 1965 (age 61)
- Place of birth: Sofia, Bulgaria
- Height: 1.89 m (6 ft 2 in)
- Position: Goalkeeper

Senior career*
Years	Team	Apps	(Gls)
1982–1990	Slavia Sofia	198	(0)
1990–1991	Energie Cottbus	17	(0)
1991–1993	Lokomotiv Sofia	43	(0)
1993	CSKA Sofia	14	(0)
1994	Slavia Sofia	8	(0)
1994–1996	Energie Cottbus	58	(0)
1996–1997	1. FC Köln	4	(0)
1997–1998	VfB Leipzig	14	(0)
1998–2001	Chemnitzer FC	62	(0)
Total		418	(0)

International career
1986–1993	Bulgaria	6	(0)

Managerial career
- 2006–2010: Energie Cottbus (goalkeeper coach)
- * Club domestic league appearances and goals

Antonio Ananiev (Bulgarian: Антонио Ананиев; born 8 May 1965) is a Bulgarian former professional footballer who played as a goalkeeper.

== Career ==
Ananiev spent most of his early career in the A PFG, becoming vice-champion of Bulgaria with Slavia Sofia in 1990 and with CSKA Sofia in 1994. He also spent the last eight years of his professional career in Germany, taking up a job as a goalkeeping coach at Energie Cottbus upon his retirement.
