= Tom Persich =

German footballer

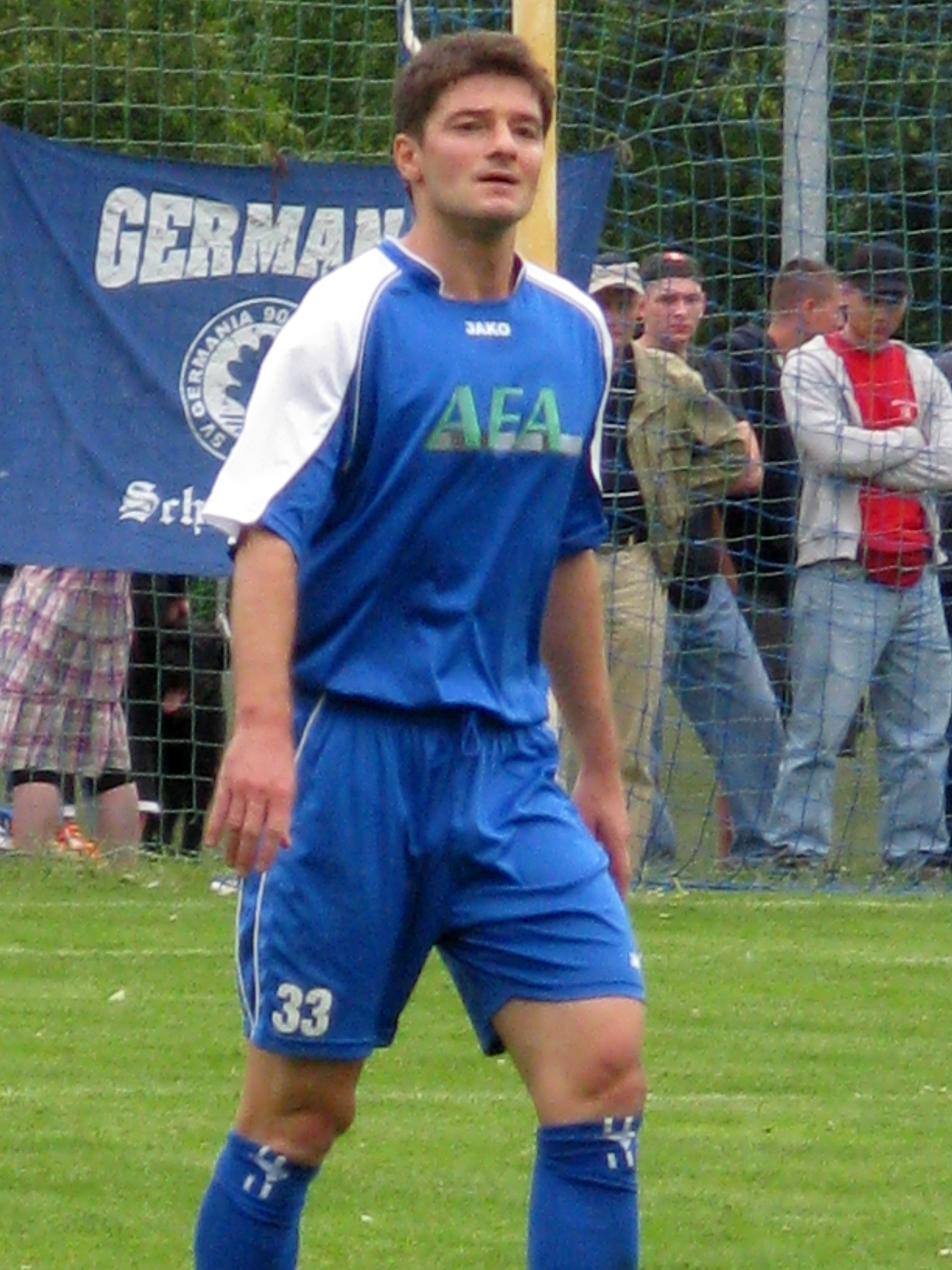
- Persich in 2009

Personal information
- Date of birth: 25 September 1971 (age 55)
- Place of birth: Weißenfels, East Germany
- Height: 1.82 m (6 ft 0 in)
- Position: Defender

Youth career
- 1976–1990: Hallescher FC

Senior career*
Years	Team	Apps	(Gls)
1990–1994	Hallescher FC	5	(0)
1994–1997	Union Berlin	97	(7)
1997–1998	SV Babelsberg 03	13	(1)
1998–2006	Union Berlin	183	(6)
Total		298	(14)
- * Club domestic league appearances and goals

Tom Persich (born 25 September 1971) is a German former professional footballer who played as a defender.

== Career ==
Persich made his debut on the professional league level in the 2. Bundesliga for Hallescher FC on 17 May 1992 when he started in a game against FC Rot-Weiß Erfurt. He also played in the UEFA Cup for Hallescher FC. He played a total of 323 games for 1. FC Union Berlin.

== Honours ==
- DFB-Pokal finalist: 2000–01
