= Farai Mbidzo =

Zimbabwean footballer (born 1972)

Personal information
- Date of birth: 6 October 1972 (age 54)
- Place of birth: Zimbabwe
- Position: Midfielder

Senior career*
Years	Team	Apps	(Gls)
–1992	Black Aces		
1993–1996	CAPS United		
1997–1998	Bonner SC	28	(0)
1998–2000	VfB Leipzig	27	(3)
2000–2006	VfB Lübeck	115	(4)
2006–2010	FC St. Pauli II		

International career
- Zimbabwe
- * Club domestic league appearances and goals

Farai Mbidzo (born 6 October 1972) is a Zimbabwean former footballer who last played as a midfielder for FC St. Pauli II.

== Early life ==
Mbidzo started playing football at the age of eleven. He started playing guitar at the age of fourteen. He has been nicknamed "Mr Perfect".

== Playing career ==
Mbidzo played for Zimbabwean side CAPS United, helping the club win the league.

== Style of play ==
Mbidzo was described as a "talented attacking midfielder... full of skill and beguiling ball artistry".

== Post-playing career ==
After retiring from professional football, Mbidzo worked as a reggae musician.

== Personal life ==
Mbidzo is the brother of Zimbabwe international John Mbidzo. He has been married and has two children. He has worked as a mechanic.
