= Vitus Nagorny =

Kyrgyzstan-born German footballer

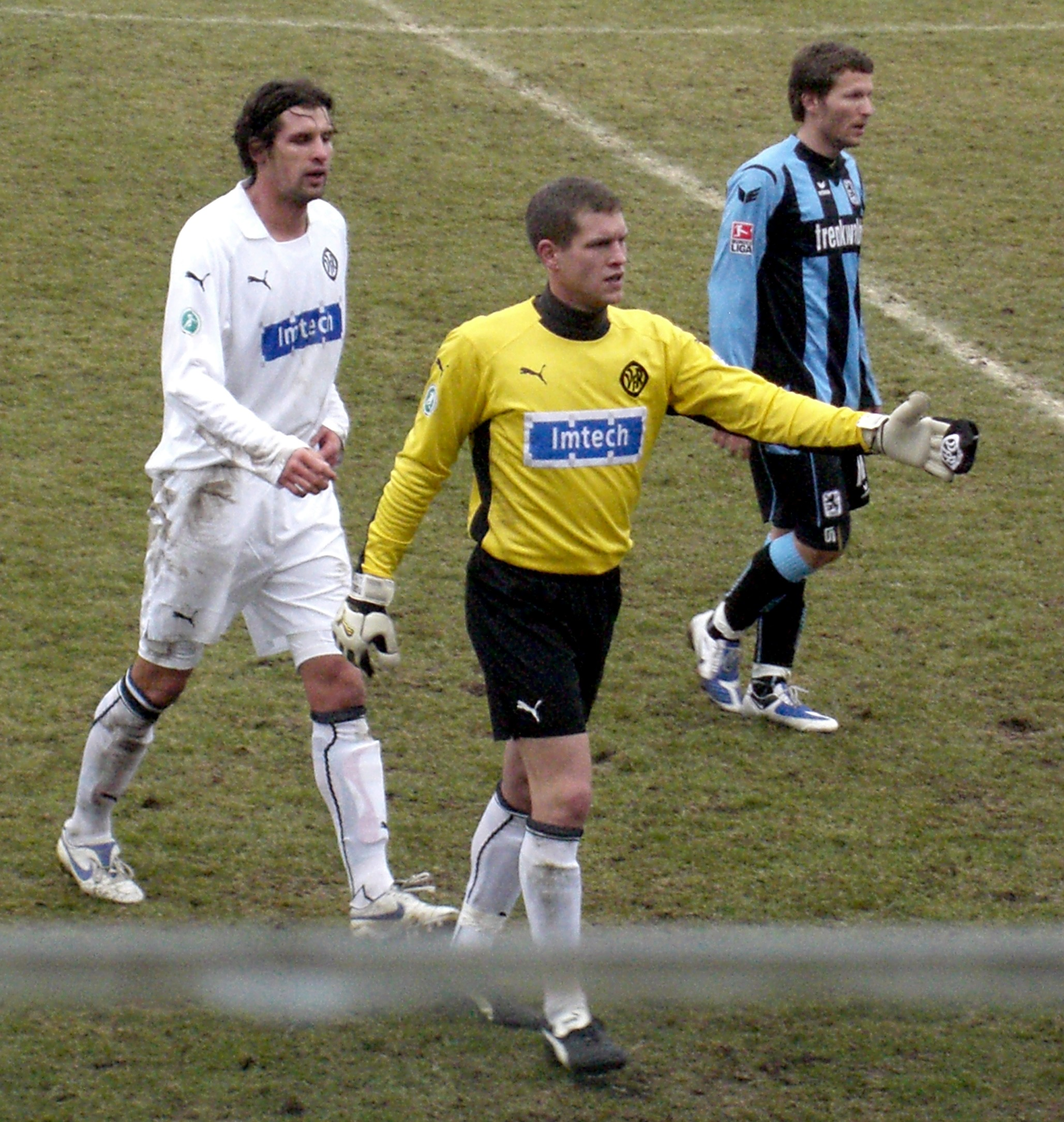
- Nagory, left, in white

Personal information
- Full name: Vitus Nagorny
- Date of birth: 21 June 1978 (age 48)
- Place of birth: Mailuu-Suu, Kyrgyz SSR, Soviet Union
- Height: 1.94 m (6 ft 4 in)
- Position: Striker

Youth career
- FC Dingolfing

Senior career*
| Years | Team | Apps | (Gls) |
| 1996–1997 | SG Post/Süd Regensburg | | |
| 1997–1998 | SpVgg Landshut | | |
| 1998–2000 | VfL Wolfsburg | 5 | (0) |
| 2000–2001 | Karlsruher SC | 23 | (4) |
| 2001–2003 | FC Schweinfurt | 44 | (3) |
| 2003 | FC Augsburg | 10 | (0) |
| 2003–2004 | SV Wehen | 33 | (12) |
| 2004–2005 | SV Elversberg | 33 | (16) |
| 2005–2006 | FC Erzgebirge Aue | 7 | (0) |
| 2006 | Eintracht Trier | 12 | (5) |
| 2006–2007 | SV Elversberg | 30 | (16) |
| 2007–2009 | FC Bayern Munich II | 38 | (6) |
| 2009 | VfR Aalen | 9 | (1) |

Managerial career
- 2012–2015: FC Teisbach
- 2015–: SpVgg Hankofen-Hailing
- * Club domestic league appearances and goals

Vitus Nagorny (born 21 June 1978) is a Kyrgyzstan-born German former footballer who played as a striker for twelve different clubs during his career.
