= Harun Isa =

Yugoslav professional footballer

Personal information
- Full name: Harun Isa
- Date of birth: 21 June 1969 (age 57)
- Place of birth: Tetovo, SFR Yugoslavia
- Height: 1.75 m (5 ft 9 in)
- Position: Striker

Youth career
- Ljuboten

Senior career*
Years	Team	Apps	(Gls)
1988–1989	Liria Prizren	37	(9)
1989–1991	Rad	12	(0)
1991–1992	Priština	10	(5)
1992–1994	Hertha Zehlendorf	46	(26)
1994–1995	Hertha BSC	29	(5)
1995–1999	Tennis Borussia Berlin	103	(30)
1999–2000	Erzgebirge Aue	27	(12)
2000–2002	Union Berlin	62	(22)
2002–2004	VfL Osnabrück	35	(10)
Total		361	(119)
- * Club domestic league appearances and goals

Harun Isa (Macedonian: Харун Иса; born 21 June 1969) is a Yugoslav former professional footballer who played as a striker.

== Club career ==
Born in Tetovo, SR Macedonia, SFR Yugoslavia, Isa started his senior career in 1988, when he started playing in the Yugoslav Second League club Liria Prizren where he won a place in the first team and started having some great exhibitions, crowned with nine goals. This earned him a trip to the Yugoslav capital Belgrade where, in January 1990, he started to play for the Yugoslav First League club FK Rad. Having failed to impress there due to the heavy competition in the squad, in January 1991, he moved to the ambitious Second League club FK Priština, the most successful Kosovar club.

After the breakup of SFR Yugoslavia, Isa went to Germany where he first played for Hertha Zehlendorf, and in 1994 signed for the famous Bundesliga club Hertha BSC. After one season, he left for another Berlin club Tennis Borussia Berlin where he consolidated a place in the team and stayed with the club four seasons. In 1999, he signed for FC Erzgebirge Aue but, after one season, returned to the German capital, this time to play for 1. FC Union Berlin. In summer of 2002 aged 33 years, Harun moved to VfL Osnabrück where he played two seasons before retiring in 2004.
