= Danko Bošković =

German footballer

Personal information
- Date of birth: 27 January 1982 (age 44)
- Place of birth: Neustadt a.d. Weinstraße, West Germany
- Height: 1.83 m (6 ft 0 in)
- Position: Forward

Youth career
- Palatia Böhl
- –1994: 1. FC 08 Haßloch
- 1994–2001: 1. FC Kaiserslautern

Senior career*
Years	Team	Apps	(Gls)
2001–2004	1. FC Kaiserslautern II	90	(28)
2001–2004	1. FC Kaiserslautern	1	(0)
2004–2005	Wehen Wiesbaden	26	(12)
2005–2007	Rot-Weiss Essen	56	(21)
2007–2008	SC Paderborn	3	(0)
2009	SV Sandhausen	16	(2)
2009–2011	Wehen Wiesbaden	58	(5)
2012	Carl Zeiss Jena	15	(4)
2012–2014	VfL Wolfsburg II	40	(13)
2014–2015	TuS Koblenz	25	(4)
2015–2017	TuS Mechtersheim	44	(15)

Managerial career
- 2015–2018: TuS Mechtersheim (playing-assistant)
- * Club domestic league appearances and goals as of 5 July 2017

Danko Bošković (Serbian Cyrillic: Данко Бошковић; born 27 January 1982) is a German former professional footballer who played as a forward.

== Career ==
Bošković made his debut on the professional league level in the Bundesliga for 1. FC Kaiserslautern on 3 April 2004 when he came on as a substitute in the 75th minute in a game against FC Bayern Munich.

== Personal life ==
Bošković was born in Neustadt an der Weinstraße. He also holds Serbian citizenship and is the cousin of Dragan Bogavac.

== Honours ==
- DFB-Pokal finalist: 2002–03
