= Jörg Böhme =

German footballer

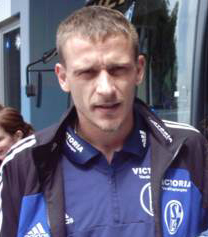
- Böhme with Schalke 04

Personal information
- Date of birth: 22 January 1974 (age 52)
- Place of birth: Hohenmölsen, East Germany
- Height: 1.78 m (5 ft 10 in)
- Position: Midfielder

Senior career*
Years	Team	Apps	(Gls)
1992–1993	Carl Zeiss Jena	2	(0)
1993–1995	1. FC Nürnberg	16	(1)
1995–1996	Eintracht Frankfurt	18	(1)
1996–1998	TSV 1860 München	23	(1)
1998–2000	Arminia Bielefeld	50	(3)
2000–2004	Schalke 04	101	(23)
2005–2006	Borussia Mönchengladbach	14	(1)
2006–2008	Arminia Bielefeld	52	(4)
Total		276	(34)

International career
2001–2003	Germany	10	(1)

Managerial career
- 2008–2010: Arminia Bielefeld II (assistant)
- 2010: Arminia Bielefeld (assistant)
- 2010–2011: Arminia Bielefeld (youth)
- 2012: SC Herford
- 2014: Energie Cottbus (assistant)
- 2014: Energie Cottbus (caretaker)
- 2014: Energie Cottbus
Medal record
Representing Germany
Men's football
FIFA World Cup
Runner-up	2002 Korea/Japan
- * Club domestic league appearances and goals

Jörg Böhme (born 22 January 1974) is a German former footballer who played as midfielder, and who most recently was the manager of Energie Cottbus.

== Club career ==
Böhme was born in Hohenmölsen, East Germany. As a professional footballer, Böhme played for FC Carl Zeiss Jena, 1. FC Nürnberg, Eintracht Frankfurt, 1860 München, Arminia Bielefeld, FC Schalke 04 and Borussia Mönchengladbach. On club level he won two German Cup trophies with FC Schalke 04.

Released by Mönchengladbach in May 2006, Böhme signed a 12-month deal mainly based on appearance money with old club Arminia Bielefeld before the start of the 2006–07 season. He remained with Bielefeld for two seasons, retiring in 2008.

== International career ==
For the Germany national team Böhme was capped 10 times and scored 1 goal between 2001 and 2003. He participated in the 2002 FIFA World Cup, where Germany finished as runners-up. The main reasons why he was included resided in his good left foot abilities and his set pieces.

== Coaching career ==
Böhme was head coach of Herford between 3 May 2012 and 5 June 2012. Bohme had only two wins while in charge of Herford. Böhme joined Energie Cottbus as an assistant coach on 22 January 2014. Böhme was promoted to head coach of Energie Cottbus after Stephan Schmidt was sacked on 24 February 2014. Böhme's first match in charge was a 1–0 win against 1. FC Kaiserslautern on 28 February 2014. Böhme was sacked following the relegation of the club. He was replaced by René Rydlewicz for the final match of the season and permanently replaced by Stefan Krämer. He finished with a record of three wins, two draws, and six losses.

== Managerial statistics ==
As of 30 November 2014

Team	From	To	Record					
Team	From	To	G	W	D	L	Win %	Ref.
SC Herford	3 May 2012	5 June 2012	6	2	1	3	33.33	
Energie Cottbus	24 February 2014	7 May 2014	11	3	2	6	27.27	
Total			17	5	3	9	29.41	—

== Honours ==
Schalke 04

- DFB-Pokal: 2000–01, 2001–02
- UEFA Intertoto Cup: 2004
