= Božidar Đurković =

Serbian football manager and player

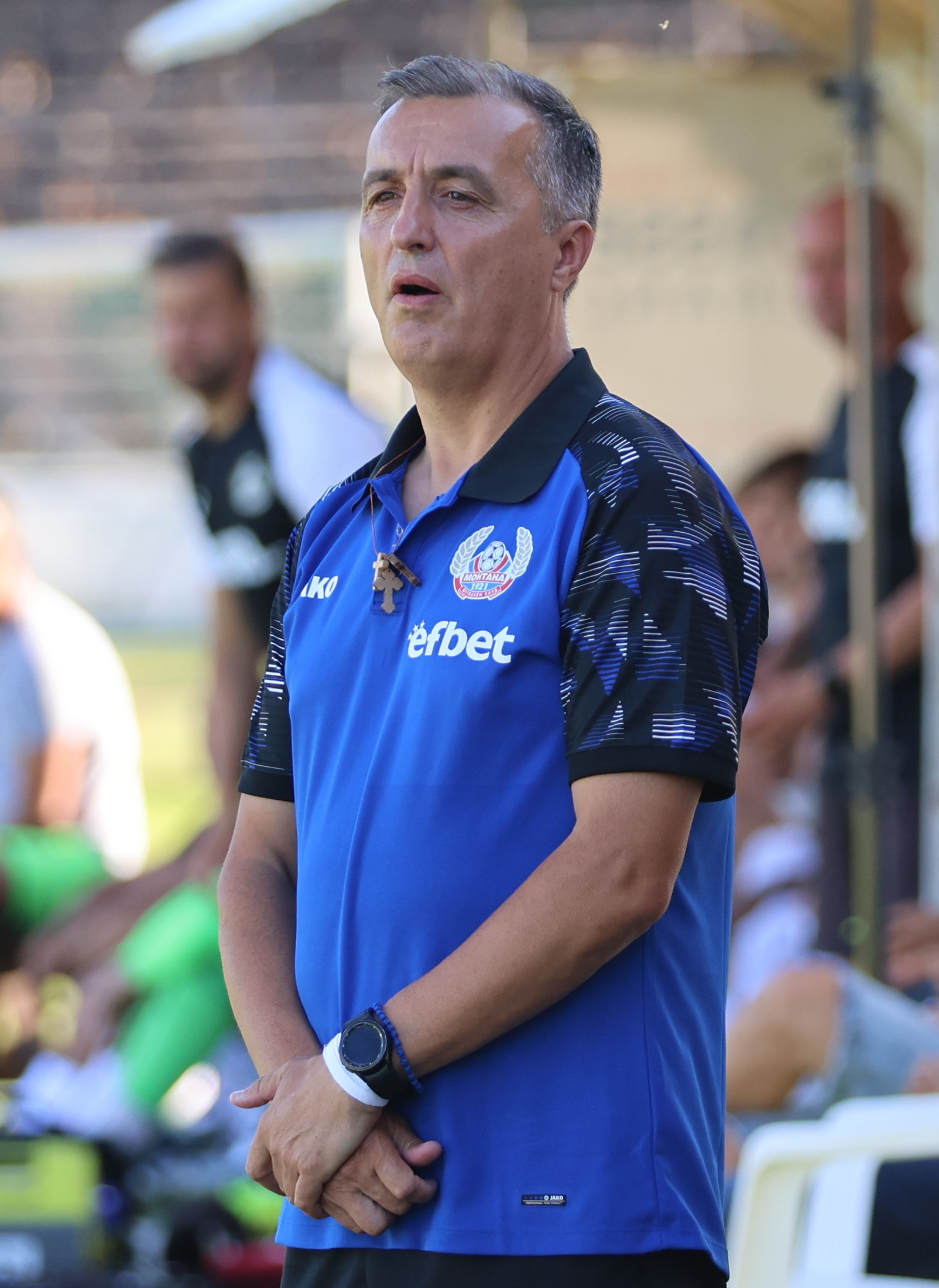

Personal information
- Full name: Božidar Đurković
- Date of birth: 4 January 1972 (age 54)
- Place of birth: Subotica, SR Serbia, SFR Yugoslavia
- Height: 1.75 m (5 ft 9 in)
- Position: Attacking midfielder

Senior career*
Years	Team	Apps	(Gls)
1992–1994	Spartak Subotica	73	(13)
1995–1997	Vojvodina	55	(10)
1997–1998	CSKA Sofia	13	(5)
1998–1999	Vitória Guimarães	9	(0)
1999–2000	OFK Beograd	21	(7)
2000–2002	Union Berlin	49	(4)
2003	OFK Beograd	3	(0)
2004	Arsenal Tula	13	(2)
2004	Pegah	6	(1)
2005–2006	Smederevo	8	(0)
2006	Javor Ivanjica	7	(1)
2007	BASK	5	(0)
Total		262	(43)

Managerial career
- 2018: Radnički Šid
- 2024: Radnički Nova Pazova
- 2026: PFC Montana
- * Club domestic league appearances and goals

Božidar Đurković (Serbian Cyrillic: Божидар Ђурковић; born 4 January 1972) is a Serbian football manager and former player, head coach of PFC Montana.

== Playing career ==
After spending five seasons in the First League of FR Yugoslavia, splitting his time between Spartak Subotica and Vojvodina, Đurković went on to play professionally in Bulgaria (CSKA Sofia), Portugal (Vitória Guimarães), Germany (Union Berlin), Russia (Arsenal Tula), and Iran (Pegah).

== Managerial career ==
In April 2024, Đurković was appointed as manager of Vojvodina League South club Radnički Nova Pazova.
