= Sven Beuckert =

German footballer

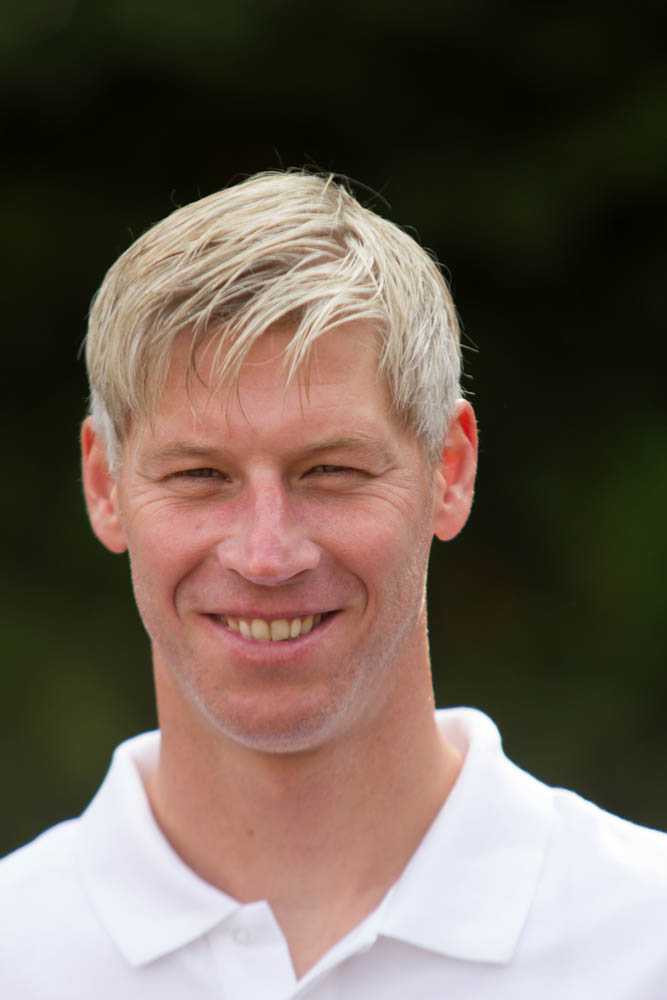
- Sven Beuckert at MSV Duisburg in 2013

Personal information
- Date of birth: 12 December 1973 (age 52)
- Place of birth: Stollberg, East Germany
- Height: 1.96 m (6 ft 5 in)
- Position: Goalkeeper

Team information
- Current team: MSV Duisburg (goalkeeper coach)

Youth career
- –1985: BMK Oelsnitz
- 1985–1988: TSG Stollberg
- 1988–1992: Erzgebirge Aue

Senior career*
Years	Team	Apps	(Gls)
1992–2000	Erzgebirge Aue	154	(0)
2000–2003	Union Berlin	81	(0)
2003–2009	MSV Duisburg	17	(0)
Total		251	(0)

Managerial career
- 2011–2012: MSV Duisburg II (assistant)
- 2011–: MSV Duisburg (goalkeeper coach)
- * Club domestic league appearances and goals

Sven Beuckert (born 12 December 1973) is a German professional footballer who played as a goalkeeper. He works at his former club MSV Duisburg as goalkeeping coach.

== Career ==
Beuckert was born in Stollberg, Saxony. He joined MSV Duisburg in the summer of 2003, playing with them two seasons in the second German division. Union as cup finalists of the 2000–01 season (losing against Champions League entrant Schalke 04) were allowed to represent Germany in the 2001–02 UEFA Cup, where they made it to the second round. Beuckert was then their first choice keeper.

== After retiring ==
After retiring in 2009, Beuckert worked as assistant coach of the amateur team of MSV Duisburg in 2011 until 2012. In November 2011, Beuckert got a new role at the club, and it was as goalkeeping coach this time.

== Career statistics ==
=== Club ===
Appearances and goals by club, season and competition
Club	Season	League			National cup		Europe		Total	
Club	Season	Division	Apps	Goals	Apps	Goals	Apps	Goals	Apps	Goals
Erzgebirge Aue	1994–95	Regionalliga Nordost	15	0	—		—		15	0
Erzgebirge Aue	1995–96	Regionalliga Nordost	22	0	—		—		22	0
Erzgebirge Aue	1996–97	Regionalliga Nordost	34	0	—		—		34	0
Erzgebirge Aue	1997–98	Regionalliga Nordost	32	0	—		—		32	0
Erzgebirge Aue	1998–99	Regionalliga Nordost	17	0	—		—		17	0
Erzgebirge Aue	1999–2000	Regionalliga Nordost	34	0	—		—		34	0
Erzgebirge Aue	Total		154	0	—		—		154	0
Union Berlin	2000–01	Regionalliga Nord	36	0	5	0	—		41	0
Union Berlin	2001–02	2. Bundesliga	32	0	3	0	4 (Note: Appearance(s) in UEFA Cup)	0	39	0
Union Berlin	2002–03	2. Bundesliga	13	0	1	0	—		14	0
Union Berlin	Total		81	0	9	0	4	0	94	0
MSV Duisburg	2003–04	2. Bundesliga	0	0	0	0	—		0	0
MSV Duisburg	2004–05	2. Bundesliga	1	0	0	0	—		1	0
MSV Duisburg	2005–06	Bundesliga	3	0	1	0	—		4	0
MSV Duisburg	2006–07	2. Bundesliga	10	0	0	0	—		10	0
MSV Duisburg	2007–08	Bundesliga	3	0	0	0	—		3	0
MSV Duisburg	Total		17	0	1	0	—		18	0
Career total			251	0	10	0	4	0	265	0
