= Markus Kullig =

German footballer

Personal information
- Date of birth: 4 November 1974 (age 51)
- Place of birth: Bielefeld, West Germany
- Height: 1.84 m (6 ft 0 in)
- Position: Midfielder

Youth career
- SV Calberlah

Senior career*
| Years | Team | Apps | (Gls) |
| 1995–1998 | VfL Wolfsburg | 7 | (0) |
| 1998–2001 | VfB Lübeck | 103 | (13) |
| 2001–2002 | 1. FC Kaiserslautern | 5 | (0) |
| 2002–2007 | VfB Lübeck | 169 | (33) |
| 2007–2008 | VfL Wolfsburg II | 24 | (3) |
- * Club domestic league appearances and goals

Markus Kullig (born 4 November 1974) is a retired German football player. He spent two seasons in the Bundesliga with VfL Wolfsburg and 1. FC Kaiserslautern.
