= List of FC Schalke 04 seasons =

FC Schalke 04 is a German football club based in Gelsenkirchen, North Rhine-Westphalia.

== Key ==
- Pld = Matches played
- W = Matches won
- D = Matches drawn
- L = Matches lost
- Pts = Points
- NH = Not held
- QR = Qualifying Round
- GS = Group stage
- R1 = Round 1
- R2 = Round 2
- R3 = Round 3
- R4 = Round 4
- R32 = Round of 32
- R16 = Round of 16
- QF = Quarter-finals
- SF = Semi-finals
- F = Final

Champions	Runners-up	Promoted	Relegated	First Tier	Second Tier

Top scorer shown in bold when he was also the league's highest or joint highest scorer.

== Early years (until 1933) ==
Season	League								Western German Champ.	German Champ.	Top scorer(s) (league)	
Season	Div.	Tier	Pld	W	D	L	Pts	Pos	Western German Champ.	German Champ.	Player(s)	Goals
1922–24	Emscher-Kreisliga	2	17	13	2	2	28	1st	–	–		
1924–26	Emscher-Kreisliga	2	22	16	3	3	35	1st	–	–		
1926–27	1. Ruhrbezirksklasse	1	16	14	2	0	30	1st	2nd	R16	Ernst Kuzorra	21
1927–28	1. Ruhrbezirksklasse	1	16	9	6	1	24	1st	3rd	R16	Ernst Kuzorra	16
1928–29	1. Ruhrbezirksklasse	1	16	13	1	2	27	1st	1st	QF	Fritz Szepan	18
1929–30	1. Ruhrbezirksklasse	1	18	16	0	2	32	1st	1st	QF	Ernst Kuzorra	34
1930–31	1. Ruhrbezirksklasse	1	16	6	1	9	13	6th	–	–	Wilhelm Kellner	8
1931–32	1. Ruhrbezirksklasse	1	18	16	0	2	32	1st	W	SF	Hermann Nattkämper	19
1932–33	1. Ruhrbezirksklasse	1	18	15	1	2	31	1st	W	RU	Hermann Nattkämper	23

== Gauliga era (1933–1945) ==
Season	League								German Champ.	DFB- Pokal	Top scorer(s) (league)	
Season	Div.	Tier	Pld	W	D	L	Pts	Pos	German Champ.	DFB- Pokal	Player(s)	Goals
1933–34	Gauliga Westfalen	1	18	16	1	1	33	1st	W	NH	Hermann Nattkämper	24
1934–35	Gauliga Westfalen	1	18	12	4	2	28	1st	W	NH	Adolf Urban	11
1935–36	Gauliga Westfalen	1	18	17	1	0	35	1st	SF	RU	Adolf Urban	19
1936–37	Gauliga Westfalen	1	18	17	1	0	35	1st	W	RU	Ernst Poertgen	22
1937–38	Gauliga Westfalen	1	18	16	2	0	34	1st	RU	W	Ernst Kuzorra	21
1938–39	Gauliga Westfalen	1	18	13	5	0	31	1st	W	–	Adolf Urban	12
1939–40	Gauliga Westfalen	1	18	15	2	1	32	1st	W	–	Hermann Eppenhoff	27
1940–41	Gauliga Westfalen	1	22	21	1	0	43	1st	RU	R3	Hermann Eppenhoff	28
1941–42	Gauliga Westfalen	1	18	15	2	1	32	1st	W	RU	Hermann Eppenhoff Ernst Kalwitzki	18
1942–43	Gauliga Westfalen	1	18	17	1	0	35	1st	QF	RU	Fritz Szepan	16
1943–44	Gauliga Westfalen	1	18	16	1	1	33	1st	R2	SF	Fritz Szepan	15
1944–45	Gauliga Westfalen	1	The season was abandoned due to World War II									

== Oberliga era (1945–1963) ==
Key

OL = Oberliga West, LL = Landesliga Westfalen Gruppe 1
EC = European Cup

Season	League								German Champ.	DFB- Pokal	Europe		Top scorer(s) (league)		Avg. attend.
Season	Div.	Tier	Pld	W	D	L	Pts	Pos	German Champ.	DFB- Pokal	Comp	Rd	Player(s)	Goals	Avg. attend.
1945–46	LL	1	16	13	2	1	28	**1st**	NH	NH	NH		(Germany) Heinz Hinz	14	
1946–47	LL	1	18	16	2	0	34	**1st** (Note: Defeated by Borussia Dortmund in the Westfalen Championship, played between the winners of the two groups.)	NH	NH	NH		(Germany) Herbert Burdenski	30	
1947–48	OL	1	24	9	6	9	24	**6th**	–	NH	NH		(Germany) Herbert Burdenski	12	16,000
1948–49	OL	1	24	6	6	12	18	**12th**	–	NH	NH		five players	4	14,500
1949–50	OL	1	30	17	3	10	37	**6th**	–	NH	NH		(Germany) Erwin Ebert (Germany) Paul Matzkowski	12	24,294
1950–51	OL	1	30	18	6	6	42	**1st**	GS	NH	NH		(Germany) **Hans Kleina**	23	23,800
1951–52	OL	1	30	18	4	8	40	**2nd**	GS	NH	NH		(Germany) Bernhard Klodt	16	23,800
1952–53	OL	1	30	14	5	11	33	**6th**	–	R1	NH		(Germany) Günter Siebert	15	19,466
1953–54	OL	1	30	16	7	7	39	**3rd**	–	–	NH		(Germany) Otto Laszig	16	26,400
1954–55	OL	1	30	11	8	11	30	**6th**	–	RU	NH		(Germany) Helmut Sadlowski	10	18,333
1955–56	OL	1	30	18	5	7	41	**2nd**	GS	–	–		(Germany) Helmut Sadlowski	14	16,266
1956–57	OL	1	30	15	6	9	36	**4th**	–	–	–		(Germany) Günter Siebert	16	19,333
1957–58	OL	1	30	16	9	5	41	**1st**	W	–	–		(Germany) Willi Soya	17	25,933
1958–59	OL	1	30	9	9	12	27	**11th**	–	–	EC	QF	(Germany) Hans Nowak	13	19,733
1959–60	OL	1	30	15	4	11	34	**4th**	–	–	–		(Germany) Waldemar Gerhardt	11	23,800
1960–61	OL	1	30	11	13	6	35	**3rd**	–	–	–		(Germany) Manfred Berz (Germany) Waldemar Gerhardt	13	24,066
1961–62	OL	1	30	18	7	5	43	**2nd**	GS	SF	–		(Germany) Willi Koslowski	14	26,466
1962–63	OL	1	30	13	9	8	35	**6th**	–	R1	–		(Germany) Waldemar Gerhardt	13	24,133

== Bundesliga era (1963–present) ==
Key

BL = Bundesliga, 2BL = 2. Bundesliga
CL = Champions League, EL = Europa League, CWC = Cup Winners' Cup, UC = UEFA Cup, IC = Intertoto Cup
LP = Ligapokal, SC = Supercup

Season	League								DFB- Pokal	Europe		Other		Top scorer(s) (league)		Avg. attend.
Season	Div.	Tier	Pld	W	D	L	Pts	Pos	DFB- Pokal	Comp	Rd	Comp	Rd	Player(s)	Goals	Avg. attend.
1963–64	BL	1	30	12	5	13	29	**8th**	QF	–		–		(Germany) Klaus Matischak	18	23,993
1964–65	BL	1	30	7	8	15	22	**16th**	SF	–		–		(Germany) Waldemar Gerhardt	11	26,467
1965–66	BL	1	34	10	7	17	27	**14th**	R2	–		–		(Germany) Manfred Kreuz	9	29,588
1966–67	BL	1	34	12	6	16	30	**15th**	QF	–		–		(Germany) Günter Herrmann	8	25,118
1967–68	BL	1	34	11	8	15	30	**15th**	R2	–		–		(Germany) Hans-Jürgen Wittkamp	12	22,765
1968–69	BL	1	34	14	7	13	35	**7th**	RU	–		–		(Germany) Hans-Jürgen Wittkamp	7	23,412
1969–70	BL	1	34	11	12	11	34	**9th**	R2	CWC	SF	–		(Germany) Manfred Pohlschmidt	9	20,118
1970–71	BL	1	34	15	6	13	36	**6th**	SF	–		–		(Germany) Klaus Fischer	15	20,676
1971–72	BL	1	34	24	4	6	52	**2nd**	W	–		–		(Germany) Klaus Fischer	22	28,529
1972–73	BL	1	34	10	8	16	28	**15th**	R2	CWC	QF	LP	SF	(Luxembourg) Nico Braun (Germany) Erwin Kremers	10	21,412
1973–74	BL	1	34	16	5	13	37	**7th**	R1	–		–		(Germany) Klaus Fischer	21	42,441
1974–75	BL	1	34	16	7	11	39	**7th**	R3	–		–		(Germany) Klaus Fischer	17	39,988
1975–76	BL	1	34	13	11	10	37	**6th**	R3	–		–		**(Germany) Klaus Fischer**	29	34,212
1976–77	BL	1	34	17	9	8	43	**2nd**	R4	UC	R3	–		(Germany) Klaus Fischer	24	37,576
1977–78	BL	1	34	14	6	14	34	**9th**	QF	UC	R2	–		(Germany) Klaus Fischer	20	35,694
1978–79	BL	1	34	9	10	15	28	**15th**	R3	–		–		(Germany) Klaus Fischer	21	34,218
1979–80	BL	1	34	12	9	13	33	**8th**	SF	–		–		(Germany) Klaus Fischer	7	26,265
1980–81	BL	1	34	8	7	19	23	**17th**	R1	–		–		(Germany) Norbert Elgert	10	28,506
1981–82	2BL	2	38	19	13	6	51	**1st**	R1	–		–		(Germany) Norbert Janzon	13	24,221
1982–83	BL	1	34	8	6	20	22	**16th** (Note: Defeated by Bayer Uerdingen in the relegation play-off.)	QF	–		–		(Germany) Hans-Joachim Abel	9	27,882
1983–84	2BL	2	38	23	9	6	55	**2nd**	SF	–		–		(Germany) Klaus Täuber	19	15,574
1984–85	BL	1	34	13	8	13	34	**8th**	R3	–		–		(Germany) Klaus Täuber	18	28,265
1985–86	BL	1	34	11	8	15	30	**10th**	QF	–		–		(Germany) Klaus Täuber	16	19,008
1986–87	BL	1	34	12	8	14	32	**13th**	R1	–		–		(Germany) Jürgen Wegmann	10	23,000
1987–88	BL	1	34	8	7	19	23	**18th**	R1	–		–		(Germany) Olaf Thon	14	23,041
1988–89	2BL	2	38	13	10	15	36	**12th**	R3	–		–		(Germany) Ingo Anderbrügge	14	14,989
1989–90	2BL	2	38	16	11	11	43	**5th**	R1	–		–		(Germany) Peter Sendscheid	18	27,011
1990–91	2BL	2	38	23	11	4	57	**1st**	R3	–		–		(Soviet Union) Aleksandr Borodyuk	13	34,637
1991–92	BL	1	38	11	12	15	34	**11th**	R2	–		–		(Germany) Ingo Anderbrügge (Germany) Peter Sendscheid	7	47,469
1992–93	BL	1	34	11	12	11	34	**10th**	R2	–		–		(Germany) Ingo Anderbrügge	10	41,724
1993–94	BL	1	34	10	9	15	29	**14th**	R3	–		–		(Germany) Ingo Anderbrügge	9	35,501
1994–95	BL	1	34	10	11	13	31	**11th**	QF	–		–		(Germany) Hendrik Herzog	8	39,883
1995–96	BL	1	34	14	14	6	56	**3rd**	R3	–		–		(Germany) Martin Max	11	38,310
1996–97	BL	1	34	11	10	13	43	**12th**	R2	UC	W	–		(Germany) Martin Max	12	39,122
1997–98	BL	1	34	13	13	8	52	**5th**	R2	UC	QF	–		(Belgium) Marc Wilmots	7	50,285
1998–99	BL	1	34	10	11	13	41	**10th**	R2	UC	R1	LP	R1	(Germany) Martin Max (Netherlands) Youri Mulder	6	43,555
1999–2000	BL	1	34	8	15	11	39	**13th**	R3	–		–		(Denmark) Ebbe Sand	14	40,543
2000–01	BL	1	34	18	8	8	62	**2nd**	W	–		–		**(Denmark) Ebbe Sand**	22	46,599
2001–02	BL	1	34	18	7	9	61	**5th**	W	CL	GS	LP	F	(Denmark) Ebbe Sand	11	60,440
2002–03	BL	1	34	12	13	9	49	**7th**	R3	UC	R3	LP	F	(Nigeria) Victor Agali	7	60,583
2003–04	BL	1	34	13	11	10	50	**7th**	R2	IC	W	–		(Denmark) Ebbe Sand	8	61,041
2003–04	BL	1	34	13	11	10	50	**7th**	R2	UC	R2	–		(Denmark) Ebbe Sand	8	61,041
2004–05	BL	1	34	20	3	11	63	**2nd**	RU	IC	W	–		(Brazil) Aílton	14	61,383
2004–05	BL	1	34	20	3	11	63	**2nd**	RU	UC	R32	–		(Brazil) Aílton	14	61,383
2005–06	BL	1	34	16	13	5	61	**4th**	R2	CL	GS	LP	W	(Germany) Kevin Kurányi (Denmark) Søren Larsen	10	61,244
2005–06	BL	1	34	16	13	5	61	**4th**	R2	UC	SF	LP	W	(Germany) Kevin Kurányi (Denmark) Søren Larsen	10	61,244
2006–07	BL	1	34	21	5	8	68	**2nd**	R2	UC	R1	LP	SF	(Germany) Kevin Kurányi	15	61,348
2007–08	BL	1	34	18	10	6	64	**3rd**	R3	CL	QF	LP	F	(Germany) Kevin Kurányi	15	61,274
2008–09	BL	1	34	14	8	12	50	**8th**	QF	CL	QR3	–		(Germany) Kevin Kurányi	13	61,387
2008–09	BL	1	34	14	8	12	50	**8th**	QF	UC	GS	–		(Germany) Kevin Kurányi	13	61,387
2009–10	BL	1	34	19	8	7	65	**2nd**	SF	–		–		(Germany) Kevin Kurányi	18	61,316
2010–11	BL	1	34	11	7	16	40	**14th**	W	CL	SF	SC	RU	(Spain) Raúl	13	61,320
2011–12	BL	1	34	20	4	10	64	**3rd**	R3	EL	QF	SC	W	**(Netherlands) Klaas-Jan Huntelaar**	29	61,218
2012–13	BL	1	34	16	7	11	55	**4th**	R3	CL	R16	–		(Germany) Julian Draxler (Netherlands) Klaas-Jan Huntelaar	10	61,171
2013–14	BL	1	34	19	7	8	64	**3rd**	R3	CL	R16	–		(Netherlands) Klaas-Jan Huntelaar	12	61,569
2014–15	BL	1	34	13	9	12	48	**6th**	R1	CL	R16	–		(Cameroon) Eric Maxim Choupo-Moting (Netherlands) Klaas-Jan Huntelaar	9	61,578
2015–16	BL	1	34	15	7	12	52	**5th**	R2	EL	R32	–		(Netherlands) Klaas-Jan Huntelaar	12	61,386
2016–17	BL	1	34	11	10	13	43	**10th**	QF	EL	QF	–		(Austria) Guido Burgstaller	9	60,703
2017–18	BL	1	34	18	9	7	63	**2nd**	SF	–		–		(Austria) Guido Burgstaller	11	61,297
2018–19	BL	1	34	8	9	17	33	**14th**	QF	CL	R16	–		(Germany) Daniel Caligiuri	7	60,895
2019–20	BL	1	34	9	12	13	39	**12th**	QF	–		–		(Germany) Suat Serdar	7	60,868 (Note: Only counting matches where spectators were allowed.)
2020–21	BL	1	34	3	7	24	16	**18th**	R3	–		–		(United States) Matthew Hoppe	6	0 (Note: All home matches were played behind closed doors due to the COVID-19 pandemic.)
2021–22	2BL	2	34	20	5	9	65	**1st**	R2	–		–		**(Germany) Simon Terodde**	30	33,469 (Note: Only counting matches where spectators were allowed. Some matches had attendance limitation.)
2022–23	BL	1	34	7	10	17	31	**17th**	R2	–		–		(Germany) Marius Bülter	11	61,154
2023–24	2BL	2	34	12	7	15	43	**10th**	R2	–		–		(Turkey) Kenan Karaman	13	61,502
2024–25	2BL	2	34	10	8	16	38	**14th**	R2	–		–		(Mali) Moussa Sylla	16	61,639
2025–26	2BL	2	34	21	7	6	70	**1st**	R2	–		–		(Turkey) Kenan Karaman	14	61,700
