= 2003–04 FC Schalke 04 season =

Schalke 04
2003–04 season
- Manager: Jupp Heynckes
- Bundesliga: 7th
- UEFA Cup: First round
- DFB-Pokal: Second round
- Top goalscorer: League: Ebbe Sand (8); All: Ebbe Sand (10)
Home colours	Away colours	Third colours

FC Schalke 04 had another disappointing season, in spite of the success of new stadium and UEFA Champions League final host Arena AufSchalke. Within weeks in the autumn, Schalke's chances of winning a trophy was slashed, losing to Brøndby in the UEFA Cup and a humiliating collapse to Freiburg in the extra time of the domestic cup, losing 7–3. The seventh position in the league also ensured Schalke had to go through the Intertoto Cup to reach European competitions, putting further pressure on coach Jupp Heynckes.

== Squad ==
=== Goalkeepers ===
- (Germany) Frank Rost
- (Germany) Christofer Heimeroth
- (Germany) Volkan Ünlü

=== Defenders ===
- (Netherlands) Marco van Hoogdalem
- (Argentina) Aníbal Matellán
- (Uruguay) Darío Rodríguez
- (Poland) Tomasz Hajto
- (Georgia (country)) Levan Kobiashvili
- (Belgium) Nico van Kerckhoven
- (Germany) Fabian Lamotte
- (Poland) Tomasz Wałdoch
- (Germany) Christian Pander
- (Germany) Thomas Kläsener

=== Midfielders ===
- (Germany) Sven Kmetsch
- (Turkey) Hamit Altıntop
- (Germany) Jörg Böhme
- (Serbia and Montenegro) Kristijan Đorđević
- (Denmark) Christian Poulsen
- (Portugal) Sérgio Pinto
- (Czech Republic) Filip Trojan
- (Netherlands) Niels Oude Kamphuis
- (Uruguay) Gustavo Varela
- (Germany) Andreas Möller
- (Germany) Simon Cziommer
- (Germany) Michael Delura

=== Attackers ===
- (Austria) Eduard Glieder
- (Nigeria) Victor Agali
- (Germany) Mike Hanke
- (Germany) Gerald Asamoah
- (Nigeria) Abdul Iyodo
- (Denmark) Ebbe Sand

== Competitions ==
=== Bundesliga ===
==== League table ====
Pos	Team	Pld	W	D	L	GF	GA	GD	Pts	Qualification or relegation
5	VfL Bochum	34	15	11	8	57	39	+18	56	Qualification to UEFA Cup first round
6	Borussia Dortmund	34	16	7	11	59	48	+11	55	Qualification to Intertoto Cup third round
7	Schalke 04	34	13	11	10	49	42	+7	50	Qualification to Intertoto Cup third round
8	Hamburger SV	34	14	7	13	47	60	−13	49	Qualification to Intertoto Cup third round
9	Hansa Rostock	34	12	8	14	55	54	+1	44	

Source: kicker.de
Rules for classification: 1) points; 2) goal difference; 3) number of goals scored.

=== Matches ===
- Schalke 04-Borussia Dortmund 2–2
- 1–0 Hamit Altıntop 40'
- 2–0 Hamit Altıntop 58'
- 2–1 Flávio Conceição 66'
- 2–2 Márcio Amoroso 90'
- 1860 Munich-Schalke 04 1–1
- 1–0 Markus Schroth 19'
- 1–1 Darío Rodríguez 56'
- Schalke 04–Köln 2–1
- 1–0 Victor Agali 42'
- 1–1 Dirk Lottner 50'
- 2–1 Hamit Altıntop 90'
- Werder Bremen-Schalke 04 4–1
- 1–0 Angelos Charisteas 12'
- 2–0 Tim Borowski 27'
- 3–0 Aílton 35'
- 4–0 Nelson Valdez 81'
- 4–1 Victor Agali 82'
- Schalke 04-Stuttgart 0–0
- Freiburg-Schalke 04 2–1
- 1–0 Zlatan Bajramović 3'
- 1–1 Darío Rodríguez 12'
- 2–1 Levan Tskitishvili 39'
- Schalke 04-Eintracht Frankfurt 1–1
- 1–0 Darío Rodríguez 33'
- 1–1 Chris 38'
- Hannover-Schalke 04 1–2
- 1–0 Thomas Christiansen 17'
- 1–1 Gerald Asamoah 29'
- 1–2 Darío Rodríguez 41'
- Schalke 04-Bochum 0–2
- 0–1 Frank Fahrenhorst 65'
- 0–2 Mamadou Diabang 78'
- Hamburg-Schalke 04 2–2
- 1–0 Bernardo Romeo 29'
- 2–0 Bernardo Romeo 68'
- 2–1 Aníbal Matellán 72'
- 2–2 Eduard Glieder 90'
- Schalke 04-Bayern Munich 2–0
- 1–0 Tomasz Hajto 16' (pen.)
- 2–0 Niels Oude Kamphuis 79'
- Bayer Leverkusen-Schalke 04 3–1
- 1–0 Dimitar Berbatov 3'
- 1–1 Mike Hanke 14'
- 2–1 Marko Babić 25'
- 3–1 Daniel Bierofka 57'
- Schalke 04-Hansa Rostock 0–1
- 0–1 Razundara Tjikuzu 53'
- Hertha Berlin-Schalke 04 1–3
- 1–0 Denis Lapaczinski 37'
- 1–1 Niels Oude Kamphuis 59'
- 1–2 Tomasz Wałdoch 68'
- 1–3 Gerald Asamoah 81'
- Schalke 04-Mönchengladbach 2–1
- 1–0 Jochen Seitz 1'
- 1–1 Ivo Ulich 43'
- 2–1 Jochen Seitz 54'
- Kaiserslautern-Schalke 04 0–2
- 0–1 Gerald Asamoah 6'
- 0–2 Victor Agali 85'
- Schalke 04-Wolfsburg 1–1
- 1–0 Hamit Altıntop 26'
- 1–1 Martin Petrov 41'
- Borussia Dortmund-Schalke 04 0–1
- 0–1 Ebbe Sand 89'
- Schalke 04–1860 Munich 0–0
- Köln-Schalke 04 0–2
- 0–1 Nico van Kerckhoven 26'
- 0–2 Michael Delura 81'
- Schalke 04-Werder Bremen 0–0
- Stuttgart-Schalke 04 0–0
- Schalke 04-Freiburg 3–0
- 1–0 Ebbe Sand 43'
- 2–0 Ebbe Sand 52'
- 3–0 Eduard Glieder 63'
- Eintracht Frankfurt-Schalke 04 3–0
- 1–0 Ioannis Amanatidis 57'
- 2–0 Ervin Skela 76'
- 3–0 Alexander Schur 80'
- Schalke 04-Hannover 2–2
- 0–1 Thomas Brdarić 14'
- 1–1 Per Mertesacker 64' (o.g.)
- 1–2 Thomas Brdarić 72'
- 2–2 Ebbe Sand 84'
- Bochum-Schalke 04 1–2
- 1–0 Martin Meichelbeck 24'
- 1–1 Thomas Kläsener 78'
- 1–2 Michael Delura 83'
- Schalke 04-Hamburg 4–1
- 1–0 Tomasz Wałdoch 10'
- 2–0 Ebbe Sand 29'
- 2–1 Mehdi Mahdavikia 35' (pen.)
- 3–1 Fabian Lamotte 43'
- 4–1 Michael Delura 55'
- Bayern Munich-Schalke 04 2–1
- 0–1 Sven Vermant 4' (pen.)
- 1–1 Roy Makaay 8'
- 2–1 Roy Makaay 64'
- Schalke 04-Bayer Leverkusen 2–3
- 0–1 Dimitar Berbatov 30'
- 1–1 Michael Delura 56'
- 1–2 Bernd Schneider 72'
- 1–3 Hans-Jörg Butt 76' (pen.)
- 2–3 Mike Hanke 77'
- Hansa Rostock-Schalke 04 3–1
- 0–1 Gerald Asamoah 10'
- 1–1 Razundara Tjikuzu 35'
- 2–1 Martin Max 61'
- 3–1 Martin Max 67'
- Schalke 04-Hertha Berlin 3–0
- 1–0 Hamit Altıntop 19'
- 2–0 Jörg Böhme 50' (pen.)
- 3–0 Ebbe Sand 60'
- Mönchengladbach-Schalke 04 2–0
- 1–0 Markus Hausweiler 1'
- 2–0 Václav Svěrkoš 45'
- Schalke 04–Kaiserslautern 4–1
- 0-1 Torsten Reuter 2' (o.g.)
- 1–1 Ebbe Sand 25'
- 2–1 Sven Vermant 34' (pen.)
- 3–1 Hamit Altıntop 55'
- 4–1 Ebbe Sand 68'
- Wolfsburg-Schalke 04 1–1
- 1–0 Miroslav Karhan 2'
- 1–1 Maik Franz 20' (o.g.)

=== Topscorers ===
- (Denmark) Ebbe Sand 7
- (Turkey) Hamit Altıntop 6
- (Uruguay) Darío Rodríguez 4
- (Germany) Gerald Asamoah 4
- (Germany) Michael Delura 3
- (Nigeria) Victor Agali 3
