= FC Schalke 04 in European football =

German club in European football

- Club: FC Schalke 04
- Seasons played: 24
- First entry: 1958–59 European Cup
- Latest entry: 2018–19 UEFA Champions League

Titles
- Champions League: 0
- Europa League: 1: 1997
- Cup Winners' Cup: 0
- Super Cup: 0

This is the list of all Schalke 04's European matches.

== Summary ==
Key

Pld = Matches played; W = Matches won; D = Matches drawn; L = Matches lost; GF = Goals for; GA = Goals against; GD = Goal difference

As of 6 June 2025

=== By competition ===
Competition	Pld	W	D	L	GF	GA	GD	Win%	First season	Last season
UEFA Champions League / European Cup	73	29	17	27	104	110	−6	39.73	1958–59	2018–19
UEFA Champions League Qualifying	4	2	1	1	5	7	−2	50.00	2008–09	2013–14
UEFA Europa League / UEFA Cup	98	50	26	22	164	92	+72	51.02	1976–77	2016–17
UEFA Europa League Qualifying	2	1	0	1	6	3	+3	50.00	2011–12	2011–12
UEFA Cup Winners' Cup	14	9	2	3	21	14	+7	64.29	1969–70	1972–73
Total	191	91	46	54	300	226	+74	47.64		

Defunct competitions indicated in italics.

=== By ground ===
Ground	Pld	W	D	L	GF	GA	GD	Win%
Home	95	59	19	17	170	93	+77	62.11
Away	95	31	27	37	127	132	−5	32.63
Neutral (Note: Playoff match in the 1958–59 European Cup vs. Kjøbenhavns Boldklub in Enschede, Netherlands)	1	1	0	0	3	1	+2	100.00
Total	191	91	46	54	300	226	+74	47.64

=== By country of opposition ===
Country	Pld	W	D	L	Win%
Austria	2	1	0	1	50.00
Belarus	2	2	0	0	100.00
Belgium	6	3	1	2	50.00
Bulgaria	4	3	1	0	75.00
Croatia	4	3	1	0	75.00
Cyprus	6	4	2	0	66.67
Czech Republic (Note: Including Czechoslovakia)	8	3	3	2	37.50
Denmark	5	3	0	2	60.00
East Germany	2	0	0	2	0.00
England	19	4	4	11	21.05
Finland	2	1	0	1	50.00
France	9	5	2	2	55.56
Germany	2	0	2	0	0.00
Greece	10	6	2	2	60.00
Hungary	1	1	0	0	100.00
(Republic of Ireland) Ireland	4	2	1	1	50.00
Israel	4	3	1	0	75.00
Italy	12	6	2	4	50.00
Latvia	2	2	0	0	100.00
Netherlands	10	4	1	5	40.00
Norway	2	2	0	0	100.00
Poland	4	1	2	1	25.00
Portugal	12	6	3	3	50.00
Romania	6	4	2	0	66.67
Russia	4	4	0	0	100.00
Scotland	1	1	0	0	100.00
Slovenia	2	1	1	0	50.00
Spain	27	8	7	12	29.63
Sweden	2	1	1	0	50.00
Switzerland	3	2	1	0	66.67
Turkey	8	3	4	1	37.50
Ukraine	4	0	2	2	0.00
(Socialist Federal Republic of Yugoslavia) Yugoslavia	2	2	0	0	100.00
Total	191	91	46	54	47.64

== UEFA competitions ==
=== 1950–2000 ===
Season	Competition	Round	Opponent	Home	Away	Aggregate
1958–59	European Cup	R1	(Denmark) Kjøbenhavns Boldklub	5–2	0–3	5–5, 3–1 (Note: Playoff match played in Enschede, Netherlands)
1958–59	European Cup	R2	(England) Wolverhampton	2–1	2–2	4–3
1958–59	European Cup	QF	(Spain) Atlético Madrid	1–1	0–3	1–4
1969–70	Cup Winners' Cup	R1	(Republic of Ireland) Shamrock Rovers	3–0	1–2	4–2
1969–70	Cup Winners' Cup	R2	(Sweden) IFK Norrköping	1–0	0–0	1–0
1969–70	Cup Winners' Cup	QF	(Socialist Federal Republic of Yugoslavia) Dinamo Zagreb	1–0	3–1	4–1
1969–70	Cup Winners' Cup	SF	(England) Manchester City	1–0	1–5	2–5
1972–73	Cup Winners' Cup	R1	(Bulgaria) Slavia Sofia	2–1	3–1	5–2
1972–73	Cup Winners' Cup	R2	(Republic of Ireland) Cork Hibernians	3–0	0–0	3–0
1972–73	Cup Winners' Cup	QF	(Czechoslovakia) Sparta Prague	2–1	0–3	2–4
1976–77	UEFA Cup	R1	(Portugal) Porto	3–2	2–2	5–4
1976–77	UEFA Cup	R2	(Romania) Sportul Studenţesc	4–0	1–0	5–0
1976–77	UEFA Cup	R3	(Belgium) R.W.D. Molenbeek	1–1	0–1	1–2
1977–78	UEFA Cup	R1	(Italy) Fiorentina	2–1	3–0 (Note: Match originally ended 0–0, but UEFA invalidated this game and awarded a 3–0 victory to Schalke 04 as Fiorentina fielded an ineligible player.)	5–1
1977–78	UEFA Cup	R2	(East Germany) 1. FC Magdeburg	1–3	2–4	3–7
1996–97	UEFA Cup	R1	(Netherlands) Roda JC	3–0	2–2	5–2
1996–97	UEFA Cup	R2	(Turkey) Trabzonspor	1–0	3–3	4–3
1996–97	UEFA Cup	R3	(Belgium) Club Brugge	2–0	1–2	3–2
1996–97	UEFA Cup	QF	(Spain) Valencia	2–0	1–1	3–1
1996–97	UEFA Cup	SF	(Spain) Tenerife	2–0^{(aet)}	0–1	2–1
1996–97	UEFA Cup	Final	(Italy) Internazionale	1–0	0–1	1–1 (4–1 p)
1997–98	UEFA Cup	R1	(Croatia) Hajduk Split	2–0	3–2	5–2
1997–98	UEFA Cup	R2	(Belgium) Anderlecht	1–0	2–1	3–1
1997–98	UEFA Cup	R3	(Portugal) Braga	2–0	0–0	2–0
1997–98	UEFA Cup	QF	(Italy) Internazionale	1–1^{(aet)}	0–1	1–2
1998–99	UEFA Cup	R1	(Czech Republic) Slavia Prague	1–0	0–1	1–1 (4–5 p)

=== 2000–2010 ===
Season	Competition	Round	Opponent	Home	Away	Aggregate
2001–02	Champions League	Group C	(Greece) Panathinaikos	0–2	0–2	4th
2001–02	Champions League	Group C	(England) Arsenal	4–1	1–3	4th
2001–02	Champions League	Group C	(Spain) Mallorca	0–1	4–0	4th
2002–03	UEFA Cup	R1	(Belarus) Gomel	4–0	4–1	8–1
2002–03	UEFA Cup	R2	(Poland) Legia Warszawa	0–0	3–2	3–2
2002–03	UEFA Cup	R3	(Poland) Wisła Kraków	1–4	1–1	2–5
2003–04	UI Cup	R3	(Moldova) Dacia Chişinău	2–1	1–0	3–1
2003–04	UI Cup	SF	(Czech Republic) Slovan Liberec	2–1	0–0	2–1
2003–04	UI Cup	Finals	(Austria) SV Pasching	0–0	2–0	2–0
2003–04	UEFA Cup	R1	(Croatia) Kamen Ingrad	1–0	0–0	1–0
2003–04	UEFA Cup	R2	(Denmark) Brøndby	2–1	1–2	3–3 (1–3 p)
2004–05	UI Cup	R3	(North Macedonia) Vardar	5–0	2–1	7–1
2004–05	UI Cup	SF	(Denmark) Esbjerg fB	3–0	3–1	6–1
2004–05	UI Cup	Finals	(Czech Republic) Slovan Liberec	2–1	1–0	3–1
2004–05	UEFA Cup	R1	(Latvia) Liepājas Metalurgs	5–1	4–0	9–1
2004–05	UEFA Cup	Group A	(Switzerland) Basel	1–1	N/A	2nd
2004–05	UEFA Cup	Group A	(Scotland) Heart of Midlothian	N/A	1–0	2nd
2004–05	UEFA Cup	Group A	(Hungary) Ferencvárosi	2–0	N/A	2nd
2004–05	UEFA Cup	Group A	(Netherlands) Feyenoord	N/A	1–2	2nd
2004–05	UEFA Cup	R32	(Ukraine) Shakhtar Donetsk	0–1	1–1	1–2
2005–06	Champions League	Group E	(Netherlands) PSV Eindhoven	3–0	0–1	3rd
2005–06	Champions League	Group E	(Italy) Milan	2–2	2–3	3rd
2005–06	Champions League	Group E	(Turkey) Fenerbahçe	2–0	3–3	3rd
2005–06	UEFA Cup	R32	(Spain) Espanyol	2–1	3–0	5–1
2005–06	UEFA Cup	R16	(Italy) Palermo	3–0	0–1	3–1
2005–06	UEFA Cup	QF	(Bulgaria) Levski Sofia	1–1	3–1	4–2
2005–06	UEFA Cup	SF	(Spain) Sevilla	0–0	0–1^{(aet)}	0–1
2006–07	UEFA Cup	R1	(France) Nancy	1–0	1–3	2–3
2007–08	Champions League	Group B	(Spain) Valencia	0–1	0–0	2nd
2007–08	Champions League	Group B	(Norway) Rosenborg	3–1	2–0	2nd
2007–08	Champions League	Group B	(England) Chelsea	0–0	0–2	2nd
2007–08	Champions League	R16	(Portugal) Porto	1–0	0–1	1–1 (4–1 p)
2007–08	Champions League	QF	(Spain) Barcelona	0–1	0–1	0–2
2008–09	Champions League	QR3	(Spain) Atlético Madrid	1–0	0–4	1–4
2008–09	UEFA Cup	R1	(Cyprus) APOEL	1–1	4–1	5–2
2008–09	UEFA Cup	Group A	(France) Paris Saint-Germain	3–1	N/A	5th
2008–09	UEFA Cup	Group A	(Spain) Racing Santander	N/A	1–1	5th
2008–09	UEFA Cup	Group A	(England) Manchester City	0–2	N/A	5th
2008–09	UEFA Cup	Group A	(Netherlands) Twente	N/A	1–2	5th

=== 2010–2019 ===
Season	Competition	Round	Opponent	Home	Away	Aggregate
2010–11	Champions League	Group B	(France) Lyon	3–0	0–1	1st
2010–11	Champions League	Group B	(Portugal) Benfica	2–0	2–1	1st
2010–11	Champions League	Group B	(Israel) Hapoel Tel Aviv	3–1	0–0	1st
2010–11	Champions League	R16	(Spain) Valencia	3–1	1–1	4–2
2010–11	Champions League	QF	(Italy) Internazionale	2–1	5–2	7–3
2010–11	Champions League	SF	(England) Manchester United	0–2	1–4	1–6
2011–12	Europa League	PO	(Finland) HJK Helsinki	6–1	0–2	6–3
2011–12	Europa League	Group J	(Cyprus) AEK Larnaca	0–0	5–0	1st
2011–12	Europa League	Group J	(Israel) Maccabi Haifa	3–1	3–0	1st
2011–12	Europa League	Group J	(Romania) FCSB	2–1	0–0	1st
2011–12	Europa League	R32	(Czech Republic) Viktoria Plzeň	3–1^{(aet)}	1–1	4–2
2011–12	Europa League	R16	(Netherlands) Twente	4–1	0–1	4–2
2011–12	Europa League	QF	(Spain) Athletic Bilbao	2–4	2–2	4–6
2012–13	Champions League	Group B	(England) Arsenal	2–2	2–0	1st
2012–13	Champions League	Group B	(France) Montpellier	2–2	1–1	1st
2012–13	Champions League	Group B	(Greece) Olympiacos	1–0	2–1	1st
2012–13	Champions League	R16	(Turkey) Galatasaray	2–3	1–1	3–4
2013–14	Champions League	PO	(Greece) PAOK	1–1	3–2	4–3
2013–14	Champions League	Group E	(England) Chelsea	0–3	0–3	2nd
2013–14	Champions League	Group E	(Switzerland) Basel	2–0	1–0	2nd
2013–14	Champions League	Group E	(Romania) FCSB	3–0	0–0	2nd
2013–14	Champions League	R16	(Spain) Real Madrid	1–6	1–3	2–9
2014–15	Champions League	Group G	(England) Chelsea	0–5	1–1	2nd
2014–15	Champions League	Group G	(Slovenia) Maribor	1–1	1–0	2nd
2014–15	Champions League	Group G	(Portugal) Sporting CP	4–3	2–4	2nd
2014–15	Champions League	R16	(Spain) Real Madrid	0–2	4–3	4–5
2015–16	Europa League	Group K	(Cyprus) APOEL	1–0	3–0	1st
2015–16	Europa League	Group K	(Greece) Asteras Tripolis	4–0	4–0	1st
2015–16	Europa League	Group K	(Czech Republic) Sparta Prague	2–2	1–1	1st
2015–16	Europa League	R32	(Ukraine) Shakhtar Donetsk	0–3	0–0	0–3
2016–17	Europa League	Group I	(France) Nice	2–0	1–0	1st
2016–17	Europa League	Group I	(Austria) Red Bull Salzburg	3–1	0–2	1st
2016–17	Europa League	Group I	(Russia) Krasnodar	2–0	1–0	1st
2016–17	Europa League	R32	(Greece) PAOK	1–1	3–0	4–1
2016–17	Europa League	R16	(Germany) Mönchengladbach	1–1	2–2	3–3 (a)
2016–17	Europa League	QF	(Netherlands) Ajax	3–2^{(aet)}	0–2	3–4
2018–19	Champions League	Group D	(Turkey) Galatasaray	2–0	0–0	2nd
2018–19	Champions League	Group D	(Russia) Lokomotiv Moscow	1–0	1–0	2nd
2018–19	Champions League	Group D	(Portugal) Porto	1–1	1–3	2nd
2018–19	Champions League	R16	(England) Manchester City	2–3	0–7	2–10

Last updated: 12 March 2019
Note: Schalke 04 score always listed first.

== Non-UEFA competitions ==
Season	Competition	Round	Opponent	Home	Away	Aggregate
1961–62	Intertoto Cup	Group B1	(Sweden) IFK Göteborg	4–1	4–2	2nd
1961–62	Intertoto Cup	Group B1	(Switzerland) La Chaux-de-Fonds	8–0	2–3	2nd
1961–62	Intertoto Cup	Group B1	(Netherlands) Feyenoord	1–5	3–1	2nd
1964–65	Intertoto Cup	Group C3	(France) Lens	2–1	2–2	3rd
1964–65	Intertoto Cup	Group C3	(Poland) Polonia Bytom	2–0	0–6	3rd
1964–65	Intertoto Cup	Group C3	(Sweden) Degerfors IF	4–1	0–2	3rd
1967	Intertoto Cup	Group B2	(Austria) Wacker Innsbruck	1–1	2–1	2nd
1967	Intertoto Cup	Group B2	(Sweden) Djurgården	2–0	1–4	2nd
1967	Intertoto Cup	Group B2	(Poland) Zagłębie Sosnowiec	1–0	0–1	2nd
1973	Intertoto Cup	Group 7	(France) Saint-Étienne	0–2	0–2	4th
1973	Intertoto Cup	Group 7	(Netherlands) Feyenoord	1–2	3–4	4th
1973	Intertoto Cup	Group 7	(Belgium) Standard Liège	1–2	1–3	4th
1992	Intertoto Cup	Group 6	(France) SM Caen	1–1	1–1	3rd
1992	Intertoto Cup	Group 6	(Netherlands) RKC Waalwijk	4–2	3–2	3rd
1992	Intertoto Cup	Group 6	(Denmark) Lyngby BK	1–2	1–3	3rd

== Record players ==
Key

CL = Champions League, CL Q = Champions League Qualifying, EL/UC = Europa League / UEFA Cup, EL Q = Europa League Qualifying, CWC = Cup Winners' Cup

As of 6 June 2025

=== Most appearances ===
#	Player	Schalke career	CL	CL Q	EL/UC	EL Q	Total
1	(Germany) Benedikt Höwedes	2007–2017	35	4	25	2	66
2	(Germany) Gerald Asamoah	1999–2010	17	2	32	–	51
3	(Netherlands) Klaas-Jan Huntelaar	2010–2017, 2021	25	–	22	2	49
4	(Cameroon) Joël Matip	2009–2016	26	2	16	2	46
5	(Germany) Ralf Fährmann	2008–2009, 2011–2025	16	–	22	2	40
5	(Peru) Jefferson Farfán	2008–2015	22	3	14	1	40
5	(Japan) Atsuto Uchida	2010–2017	29	2	7	2	40
8	(Germany) Julian Draxler	2011–2015	23	2	11	2	38
9	(Germany) / (United States) Jermaine Jones	2007–2010, 2011–2014	21	4	12	–	37
10	(Brazil) Marcelo Bordon	2004–2010	16	2	18	–	36

=== Top goalscorers ===
Numbers in brackets indicate appearances made. Ø = goals per game

#	Player	Schalke career	CL	CL Q	EL/UC	EL Q	CWC	Total	Ø
1	(Netherlands) Klaas-Jan Huntelaar	2010–2017, 2021	13 (25)	–	14 (22)	4 (2)	–	31 (49)	0.63
2	(Denmark) Ebbe Sand	1999–2006	2 (9)	–	8 (22)	–	–	10 (31)	0.32
3	(Germany) Mike Hanke	2001–2005	–	–	9 (13)	–	–	9 (13)	0.69
3	(Spain) Raúl	2010–2012	5 (12)	–	4 (10)	0 (1)	–	9 (23)	0.39
3	(Belgium) Marc Wilmots	1996–2000, 2001–2003	0 (3)	–	9 (23)	–	–	9 (26)	0.35
6	(Germany) Klaus Fischer	1970–1981	–	–	6 (8)	–	1 (1)	7 (9)	0.78
6	(Brazil) Lincoln	2004–2007	3 (6)	–	4 (13)	–	–	7 (19)	0.37
6	(Germany) Kevin Kurányi	2005–2010	5 (14)	0 (2)	2 (13)	–	–	7 (29)	0.24
6	(Georgia (country)) Levan Kobiashvili	2003–2009	3 (11)	0 (1)	4 (23)	–	–	7 (35)	0.20
6	(Germany) Julian Draxler	2011–2015	4 (23)	1 (2)	1 (11)	1 (2)	–	7 (38)	0.18
