= 2004–05 FC Schalke 04 season =

Schalke 04
2004–05 season
- Manager: Jupp Heynckes; Ralf Rangnick
- Bundesliga: 2nd
- DFB-Pokal: Runners-up
- UEFA Cup: Round of 32
- Intertoto Cup: Winners
- Top goalscorer: League: Aílton (14); All: Aílton (20)
Home colours	Away colours	Third colours

FC Schalke 04 had a surprise title tilt at Bundesliga, in spite of a poor start to the season and the resultant dismissal of manager Jupp Heynckes. With largely unproven Ralf Rangnick taking over, Schalke went about level with title rivals Bayern Munich after a 1–0 win thanks to a goal from Lincoln. From there on, Bayern dominated, leaving Schalke a full 14 points behind, albeit good enough for runners-up, qualifying the team for the Champions League.

== First-team squad ==
Squad at end of season

Note: Flags indicate national team as defined under FIFA eligibility rules; some limited exceptions apply. Players may hold more than one non-FIFA nationality.

No.	Pos.	Nation	Player
1	GK	GER	Frank Rost
2	MF	DEN	Christian Poulsen
3	DF	GEO	Levan Kobiashvili
4	DF	GER	Thomas Kläsener
5	DF	BRA	Marcelo Bordon
6	MF	TUR	Hamit Altıntop (Note: Altıntop was born in Gelsenkirchen, West Germany (now Germany), but also qualified to represent Turkey internationally and represented them at U-18, U-20 and U-21 level before making his international debut for Turkey in 2004.)
7	MF	GER	Michael Delura
9	FW	BRA	Aílton
10	MF	BRA	Lincoln
11	FW	DEN	Ebbe Sand
12	DF	NED	Marco van Hoogdalem
13	GK	GER	Christofer Heimeroth
14	FW	GER	Gerald Asamoah (Note: Asamoah was born in Mampong, Ghana, but was raised in Germany from the age of 12 and made his international debut for Germany in May 2001.)
15	DF	POL	Tomasz Wałdoch
16	DF	URU	Darío Rodríguez
17	MF	BEL	Sven Vermant

No.	Pos.	Nation	Player
18	MF	NED	Niels Oude Kamphuis
19	MF	URU	Gustavo Varela
20	DF	SCG	Mladen Krstajić (Note: Krstajić was born in Zenica, SFR Yugoslavia (now Bosnia and Herzegovina), but was raised in Serbia and Montenegro (now Serbia) and made his international debut for Serbia and Montenegro in 1999.)
21	MF	GER	Alexander Baumjohann
23	DF	GER	Fabian Lamotte
24	DF	GER	Christian Pander
25	FW	GER	Kai Hesse
26	FW	GER	Mike Hanke
27	DF	GER	Tim Hoogland
29	GK	GER	Volkan Ünlü
30	DF	GER	Christian Petereit
31	MF	GER	Sven Kmetsch
32	DF	GER	Niko Bungert
33	MF	GER	Mimoun Azaouagh (Note: Azaouagh was born in Beni Sidel, Morocco, but also qualified to represent Germany internationally and represented them at U-21 level.)
34	MF	GER	Ahmet Cebe

=== Left club during season ===
Note: Flags indicate national team as defined under FIFA eligibility rules; some limited exceptions apply. Players may hold more than one non-FIFA nationality.

No. / Pos. / Nation / Player; 5 / MF / GER / Jörg Böhme (to Borussia Mönchengladbach)	No. / Pos. / Nation / Player; 28 / DF / GER / Simon Talarek (to SG Wattenscheid 09)

== Competitions ==
=== Bundesliga ===
==== League table ====
Pos	Team	Pld	W	D	L	GF	GA	GD	Pts	Qualification or relegation
1	Bayern Munich (C)	34	24	5	5	75	33	+42	77	Qualification to Champions League group stage
2	Schalke 04	34	20	3	11	56	46	+10	63	Qualification to Champions League group stage
3	Werder Bremen	34	18	5	11	68	37	+31	59	Qualification to Champions League third qualifying round
4	Hertha BSC	34	15	13	6	59	31	+28	58	Qualification to UEFA Cup first round (Note: Since DFB Cup winners Bayern Munich and finalists Schalke 04 both qualified for the Champions League, the UEFA Cup place for the cup-winners was given to 6th placed Bayer Leverkusen.)
5	VfB Stuttgart	34	17	7	10	54	40	+14	58	Qualification to UEFA Cup first round

Rules for classification: 1) points; 2) goal difference; 3) number of goals scored.
(C) Champions

=== DFB-Pokal ===
==== Final ====
28 May 2005	Schalke 04	1–2	Bayern Munich	Berlin
20:45 CEST	Lincoln 45' (pen.)	Report	Makaay 42'; Salihamidžić 76'	Stadium: Olympiastadion; Attendance: 74,349; Referee: Florian Meyer (Burgdorf)

=== UEFA Intertoto Cup ===
==== Third round ====
17 July 2004 First leg	Schalke 04 (Germany)	5–0	(North Macedonia) Vardar	Gelsenkirchen, Germany
17:15 (CEST)	Krstajić 19'; Altıntop 40'; Aílton 50'; Kläsener 81'; Tanevski 90' (o.g.)	Report		Stadium: Arena AufSchalke; Attendance: 56,054; Referee: Milan Šedivý (Czech Republic)

24 July 2004 Second leg	Vardar (North Macedonia)	1–2 (1–7 agg.)	(Germany) Schalke 04	Skopje, Macedonia
17:00 (CEST)	Wandeir 84'	Report	Pander 4'; Sand 15'	Stadium: Gradski Stadion; Attendance: 4,000; Referee: Carlo Bertolini (Switzerland)

==== Semi-finals ====
28 July 2004 First leg	Esbjerg (Denmark)	1–3	(Germany) Schalke 04	Herning, Denmark
19:45 (CEST)	Lucena 8'	Report	Aílton 40'; Hanke 71'; Altıntop 87'	Stadium: MCH Arena; Attendance: 8,000; Referee: Mark Halsey (England)

3 August 2004 Second leg	Schalke 04 (Germany)	3–0 (6–1 agg.)	(Denmark) Esbjerg	Gelsenkirchen, Germany
20:15 (CEST)	Hanke 11'; Altıntop 54'; Asamoah 63'	Report		Stadium: Arena AufSchalke; Attendance: 56,320; Referee: Carlos Megía Dávila (Spain)

==== Final ====
10 August 2004 First leg	Schalke 04 (Germany)	2–1	(Czech Republic) Slovan Liberec	Gelsenkirchen, Germany
20:15 (CEST)	Aílton 25'; Asamoah 41'	Report	Zápotočný 74'	Stadium: Arena AufSchalke; Attendance: 54,136; Referee: Roberto Rosetti (Italy)

24 August 2004 Second leg	Slovan Liberec (Czech Republic)	0–1 (1–3 agg.)	(Germany) Schalke 04	Liberec, Czech Republic
18:45 (CEST)		Report	Aílton 87'	Stadium: Stadion u Nisy; Attendance: 7,880; Referee: Yuri Baskakov (Russia)

=== UEFA Cup ===
==== First round ====
16 September 2004 First leg	Schalke 04 (Germany)	5–1	(Latvia) Liepājas Metalurgs	Gelsenkirchen, Germany
18:15 (CEST)	Sand 20', 53', 60'; Kobiashvili 67'; Asamoah 89'	Report	Katasonov 34'	Stadium: Arena AufSchalke; Attendance: 50,304; Referee: Martin Ingvarsson (Sweden)

30 September 2004 Second leg	Liepājas Metalurgs (Latvia)	0–4 (1–9 agg.)	(Germany) Schalke 04	Liepāja, Latvia
16:00 (CEST)		Report	Sand 45'; Hanke 63', 75', 90'	Stadium: Daugava Stadium; Attendance: 2,500; Referee: Dougie McDonald (Scotland)

==== Group stage ====
Pos	Team	Pld	W	D	L	GF	GA	GD	Pts	Qualification	FEY	SCH	BSL	FER	HOM
1	(Netherlands) Feyenoord	4	2	1	1	6	3	+3	7	Advance to knockout stage	—	2–1	—	—	3–0
2	(Germany) Schalke 04	4	2	1	1	5	3	+2	7	Advance to knockout stage	—	—	1–1	2–0	—
3	(Switzerland) Basel	4	2	1	1	5	4	+1	7	Advance to knockout stage	1–0	—	—	—	1–2
4	(Hungary) Ferencváros	4	1	1	2	3	5	−2	4		1–1	—	1–2	—	—
5	(Scotland) Heart of Midlothian	4	1	0	3	2	6	−4	3		—	0–1	—	0–1	—

Source: RSSSF

21 October 2004 1	Schalke 04 (Germany)	1–1	(Switzerland) Basel	Gelsenkirchen, Germany
20:30 (CEST)	Kobiashvili 8'	Report	Delgado 82'	Stadium: Arena AufSchalke; Attendance: 52,900; Referee: Johan Verbist (Belgium)

4 November 2004 2	Hearts (Scotland)	0–1	(Germany) Schalke 04	Edinburgh, Scotland
20:30 (CET)	Kisnorbo (yellow card) ?' (red card) 48'	Report	Lincoln 73'	Stadium: Murrayfield; Attendance: 27,272; Referee: Nikolai Ivanov (Russia)

25 November 2004 3	Schalke 04 (Germany)	2–0	(Hungary) Ferencváros	Gelsenkirchen, Germany
18:15 (CET)	Gyepes 16' (o.g.); Kobiashvili 40'	Report		Stadium: Arena AufSchalke; Attendance: 51,179; Referee: Claude Colombo (France)

1 December 2004 4	Feyenoord (Netherlands)	2–1	(Germany) Schalke 04	Rotterdam, Netherlands
20:45 (CET)	Kalou 32', 40'	Report	Hanke 6'	Stadium: Feijenoord Stadion; Attendance: 48,000; Referee: Matt Messias (England)

==== Round of 32 ====
16 February 2005 First leg	Shakhtar Donetsk (Ukraine)	1–1	(Germany) Schalke 04	Donetsk, Ukraine
18:15 (CET)	Brandão 86'	Report	Aílton 7'	Stadium: RSC Olimpiyskiy; Attendance: 21,000; Referee: Espen Berntsen (Norway)

24 February 2005 Second leg	Schalke 04 (Germany)	0–1 (1–2 agg.)	(Ukraine) Shakhtar Donetsk	Gelsenkirchen, Germany
18:00 (CET)		Report	Aghahowa 22'	Stadium: Arena AufSchalke; Attendance: 51,180; Referee: Vladimír Hriňák (Slovakia)
