= 2002–03 FC Schalke 04 season =

Schalke 04
2002–03 season
- Manager: Frank Neubarth; Marc Wilmots
- Bundesliga: 7th
- UEFA Cup: 3rd Round
- DFB-Pokal: Round of 16
- Top goalscorer: League: Victor Agali (7); All: Ebbe Sand (13)
Home colours	Away colours	Third colours

FC Schalke 04 had another disappointing season, in which it failed to qualify for the Champions League. New coach Frank Neubarth did not last long, and was sacked and replaced by captain Marc Wilmots in the dugout. Once again, goalscoring was at a premium, with top scorer Victor Agali managing only seven in total. The end result was 7th place in Bundesliga, barely even qualifying for the Intertoto Cup.

== Squad ==
=== Goalkeepers ===
- (Germany) Frank Rost
- (Germany) Oliver Reck
- (Germany) Christofer Heimeroth

=== Defenders ===
- (Netherlands) Marco van Hoogdalem
- (Argentina) Anibal Matellán
- (Poland) Tomasz Hajto
- (Poland) Tomasz Wałdoch
- (Belgium) Nico van Kerckhoven
- (Germany) Fabian Lamotte
- (Uruguay) Darío Rodríguez

=== Midfielders ===
- (Belgium) Marc Wilmots
- (Belgium) Sven Vermant
- (Portugal) Sérgio Pinto
- (Germany) Jörg Böhme
- (Serbia and Montenegro) Kristijan Djordjević
- (Denmark) Christian Poulsen
- (Germany) Mike Büskens
- (Czech Republic) Filip Trojan
- (Netherlands) Niels Oude Kamphuis
- (Uruguay) Gustavo Varela
- (Germany) Andreas Möller

=== Attackers ===
- (Belgium) Émile Mpenza
- (Nigeria) Victor Agali
- (Germany) Mike Hanke
- (Germany) Gerald Asamoah
- (Nigeria) Abdul Iyodo
- (Denmark) Ebbe Sand

== Competitions ==
=== Bundesliga ===
==== League table ====
Pos	Team	Pld	W	D	L	GF	GA	GD	Pts	Qualification or relegation
5	Hertha BSC	34	16	6	12	52	43	+9	54	Qualification to UEFA Cup first round
6	Werder Bremen	34	16	4	14	51	50	+1	52	Qualification to Intertoto Cup third round
7	Schalke 04	34	12	13	9	46	40	+6	49	Qualification to Intertoto Cup third round
8	VfL Wolfsburg	34	13	7	14	39	42	−3	46	Qualification to Intertoto Cup second round
9	VfL Bochum	34	12	9	13	55	56	−1	45	

Source: bundesliga.de
Rules for classification: 1) points; 2) goal difference; 3) number of goals scored.

=== Matches ===
- Schalke 04-VfL Wolfsburg 1–0
- 1–0 Sven Vermant (88)
- Kaiserslautern-Schalke 04 1–3
- 1–0 Thomas Riedl (33)
- 1–1 Jörg Böhme (48 pen)
- 1–2 Victor Agali (59)
- 1–3 Ebbe Sand (90)
- Schalke 04-Hertha BSC 0–0
- Stuttgart-Schalke 04 1–1
- 1–0 Marcelo Bordon (34)
- 1–1 Tomasz Hajto (86 pen)
- Borussia Dortmund-Schalke 04 1–1
- 0–1 Victor Agali (69)
- 1–1 Ewerthon (70)
- Schalke 04-Mönchengladbach 2–1
- 1–0 Christian Poulsen (15)
- 1–1 Joris van Hout (31)
- 2–1 Victor Agali (45)
- Arminia Bielefeld-Schalke 04 2–1
- 1–0 Erhan Albayrak (7 pen)
- 1–1 Gustavo Varela (20 pen)
- 2–1 Mamadou Diabang (68)
- Schalke 04-Hamburg 3–0
- 1–0 Victor Agali (9)
- 2–0 Ebbe Sand (15)
- 3–0 Gerald Asamoah (45)
- 1860 Munich-Schalke 04 3–0
- 1–0 Benjamin Lauth (60)
- 2–0 Benjamin Lauth (76)
- 3–0 Markus Schroth (80)
- Schalke 04–Nürnberg 1–1
- 0–1 Saša Ćirić (12)
- 1–1 Sven Vermant (90)
- Energie Cottbus-Schalke 04 0–1
- 0–1 Andreas Möller (80)
- Schalke 04-Bayer Leverkusen 0–1
- 0–1 Bernd Schneider (90 pen)
- Bochum-Schalke 04 0–2
- 0–1 Andreas Möller (48)
- 0–2 Gerald Asamoah (86)
- Schalke 04-Hansa Rostock 2–2
- 1–0 Ebbe Sand (6)
- 2–0 Émile Mpenza (39)
- 2–1 Peter Wibrån (51)
- 2–2 Rade Priča (86)
- Hannover-Schalke 04 0–2
- 0–1 Jörg Böhme (15 pen)
- 0–2 Émile Mpenza (19)
- Schalke 04-Werder Bremen 1–1
- 0–1 Markus Daun (3)
- 1–1 Ebbe Sand (7)
- Bayern Munich-Schalke 04 0–0
- Wolfsburg-Schalke 04 1–2
- 0–1 Sven Kmetsch (47)
- 0–2 Gustavo Varela (51)
- 1–2 Tomislav Marić (71)
- Schalke 04–Kaiserslautern 2–2
- 1–0 Victor Agali (5)
- 1–1 Tomasz Klos (31)
- 2–1 Victor Agali (69)
- 2–2 Harry Koch (90)
- Hertha BSC-Schalke 04 4–2
- 0–1 Émile Mpenza (1)
- 1–1 Michael Preetz (28)
- 2–1 Alex Alves (39)
- 3–1 Gustavo Varela (48 og)
- 3–2 Niels Oude Kamphuis (78)
- 4–2 Marcelinho (88)
- Schalke 04-Stuttgart 2–0
- 1–0 Émile Mpenza (3)
- 2–0 Tomasz Hajto (45)
- Schalke 04-Borussia Dortmund 2–2
- 1–0 Sven Vermant (13)
- 2–0 Nico van Kerckhoven (16)
- 2–1 Jan Koller (52)
- 2–2 Ewerthon (58)
- Mönchengladbach-Schalke 04 2–2
- 0–1 Tomasz Wałdoch (26)
- 1–1 Peer Kluge (57)
- 1–2 Tomasz Hajto (64)
- 2–2 Igor Demo (69)
- Schalke 04-Arminia Bielefeld 1–1
- 0–1 Bastian Reinhardt (57)
- 1–1 Sven Vermant (89)
- Hamburg-Schalke 04 3–1
- 1–0 Bernardo Romeo (29)
- 1–1 Marco van Hoogdalem (57)
- 2–1 Naohiro Takahara (86)
- 3–1 Bernardo Romeo (90)
- Schalke 04-1860 Munich 1–1
- 1–0 Émile Mpenza (38)
- 1–1 Marco van Hoogdalem (43 og)
- Nürnberg-Schalke 04 0–0
- Schalke 04-Energie Cottbus 3–0
- 1–0 Jörg Böhme (45 pen)
- 2–0 Ebbe Sand (54)
- 3–0 Jörg Böhme (61)
- Bayer Leverkusen-Schalke 04 1–3
- 1–0 Dimitar Berbatov (9)
- 1–1 Jörg Böhme (12)
- 1–2 Ebbe Sand (61)
- 1–3 Gerald Asamoah (90)
- Schalke 04-Bochum 1–2
- 0–1 Thomas Christiansen (24)
- 1–1 Gustavo Varela (29)
- 1–2 Delron Buckley (89)
- Hansa Rostock-Schalke 04 3–1
- 0–1 Gustavo Varela (16)
- 1–1 Rade Priča (65)
- 2–1 Magnus Arvidsson (79)
- 3–1 René Rydlewicz (84)
- Schalke 04-Hannover 0–2
- 0–1 Nebojša Krupniković (60)
- 0–2 Jiří Štajner (73)
- Werder Bremen-Schalke 04 2–1
- 1–0 Angelos Charisteas (22)
- 1–1 Victor Agali (36)
- 2–1 Johan Micoud (57)
- Schalke 04-Bayern Munich 1–0
- 1–0 Niels Oude Kamphuis (38)

=== Topscorers ===
- (Nigeria) Victor Agali 7
- (Denmark) Ebbe Sand 6
- (Germany) Jörg Böhme 5
- (Belgium) Émile Mpenza 5
