= St. Mary's Church, Helminghausen =

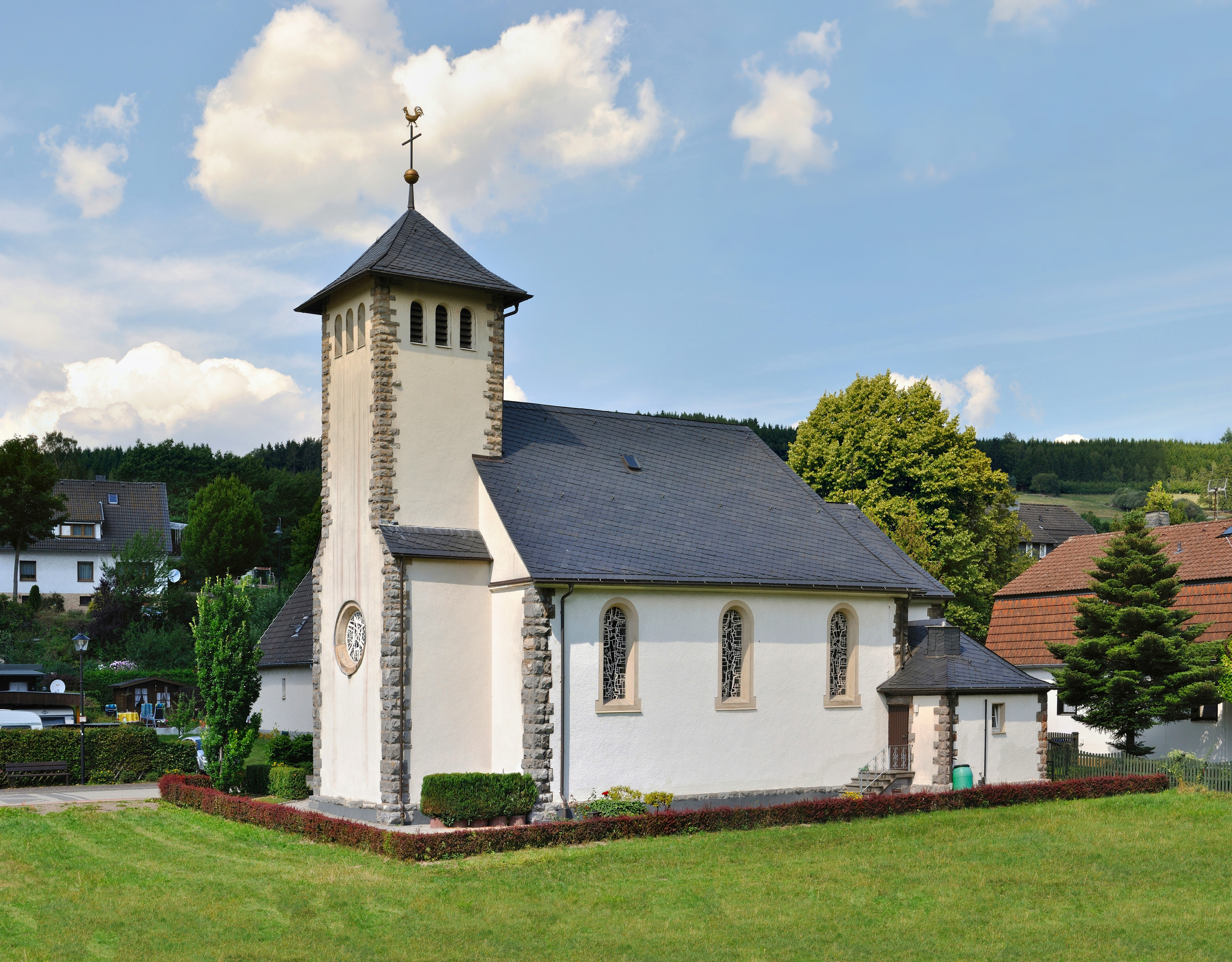
- The Roman Catholic church from the south-east

- Location within North Rhine-Westphalia Location within Germany
- 51°22′56″N 8°43′45″E
- Country: Germany
- Denomination: Catholic

History
- Founded: 8 July 1906

St. Mary's (German: St. Maria von der Immerwährenden Hilfe, literally "St. Mary of the perpetual help") is the name of the Catholic Church of the German town Helminghausen, Marsberg, North Rhine-Westphalia, Germany. It was founded in 1906/07.

== History ==
On 8 July 1906, the foundation stone was laid on an area which was purchased by the land tenure Eduard Isphording. The construction permit for this area was conferred in July 1905. Young men of the town Helminghausen built the church with timber; two steel bells came from the “Bochumer Verein für Bergbau und Gussstahlfabrikation". Benches, statues and vestments were donated, a harmonium was bought.

The blessing of the church was done by a priest from Beringhausen on 15 October 1907, who dedicated it to St. Markus.

In 1947/48, an extension was built, which is covered by a vestry. When the flèche fell into a state of dilapidation in 1956, a new steeple was erected. Further renovations took place from 1972 to 1984.

Since the mid-50s, the patron saint of the Church is called Maria von der Immerwährenden Hilfe.
