= Sven Lintjens =

German footballer

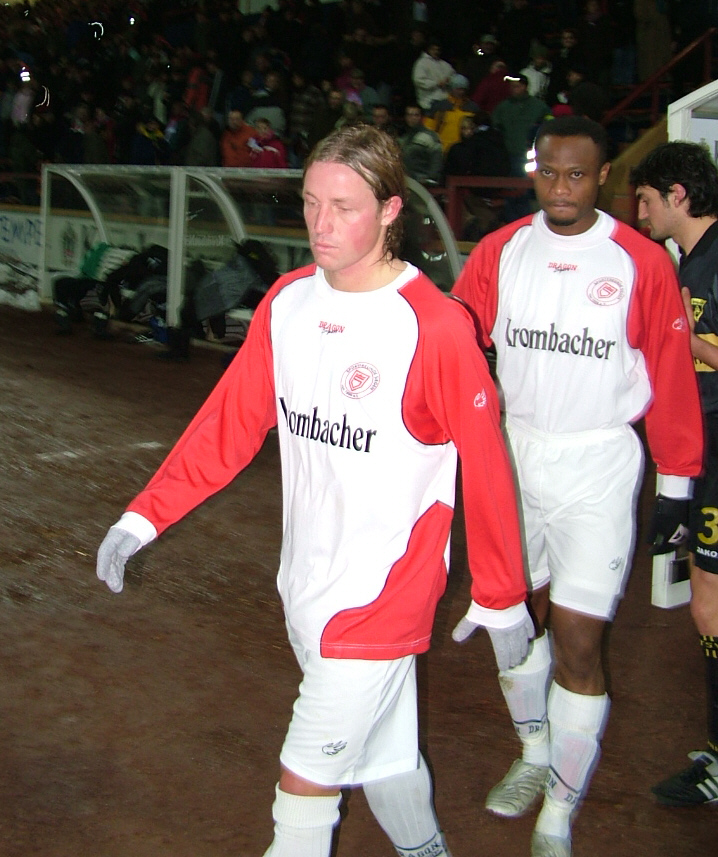

Personal information
- Date of birth: 5 October 1976 (age 50)
- Place of birth: Mönchengladbach, West Germany
- Height: 1.82 m (6 ft 0 in)
- Position: Attacking midfielder

Youth career
- Bayer Uerdingen

Senior career*
Years	Team	Apps	(Gls)
1995–1999	Borussia Mönchengladbach II		
1997–1999	Borussia Mönchengladbach	2	(0)
1999–2000	Fortuna Köln	11	(0)
2000–2003	SG Wattenscheid 09	59	(19)
2003–2005	Rot-Weiß Essen	51	(8)
2005–2006	Sportfreunde Siegen	26	(7)
2006–2007	1. FC Saarbrücken	7	(0)
2007	MVV	12	(1)
2007–2008	Wuppertaler SV	18	(5)
2008	SC Paderborn	5	(0)
2009–2010	Wuppertaler SV	15	(3)
- * Club domestic league appearances and goals

Sven Lintjens (born 5 October 1976) is a German former professional footballer who played as an attacking midfielder.

== Career ==
Sven Lintjens began his career in 1998 at Borussia Mönchengladbach, where he was positioned in defense. Subsequently, he had brief stints at KFC Uerdingen 05, and SC Fortuna Köln as a midfielder.

From 2000 to 2003, he played for SG Wattenscheid 09, and in the 2001/02 season, he scored eleven goals playing up front. From 2003 to 2005 he was with Rot-Weiss Essen, and was the top scorer for Sportfreunde Siegen in the 2005/06 season with seven goals.

For the 2006/07 season, Lintjens signed with 1. FC Saarbrücken in the Regionalliga Süd. In January 2007, he transferred to the Dutch second division club MVV Maastricht. In the first half of the 2007/08 season, he played for Wuppertal SV Borussia, but he ended his contract after the DFB Cup round of 16 against FC Bayern Munich. He then played half a season for SC Paderborn 07, before returning to Wuppertaler SV Borussia in December 2008.

After recovering from injury, he signed a contract with the 3rd division for the second half of 2008/09, and ultimately ended his career with this club in 2010.
