= Hamit Altıntop =

Turkish footballer (born 1982)

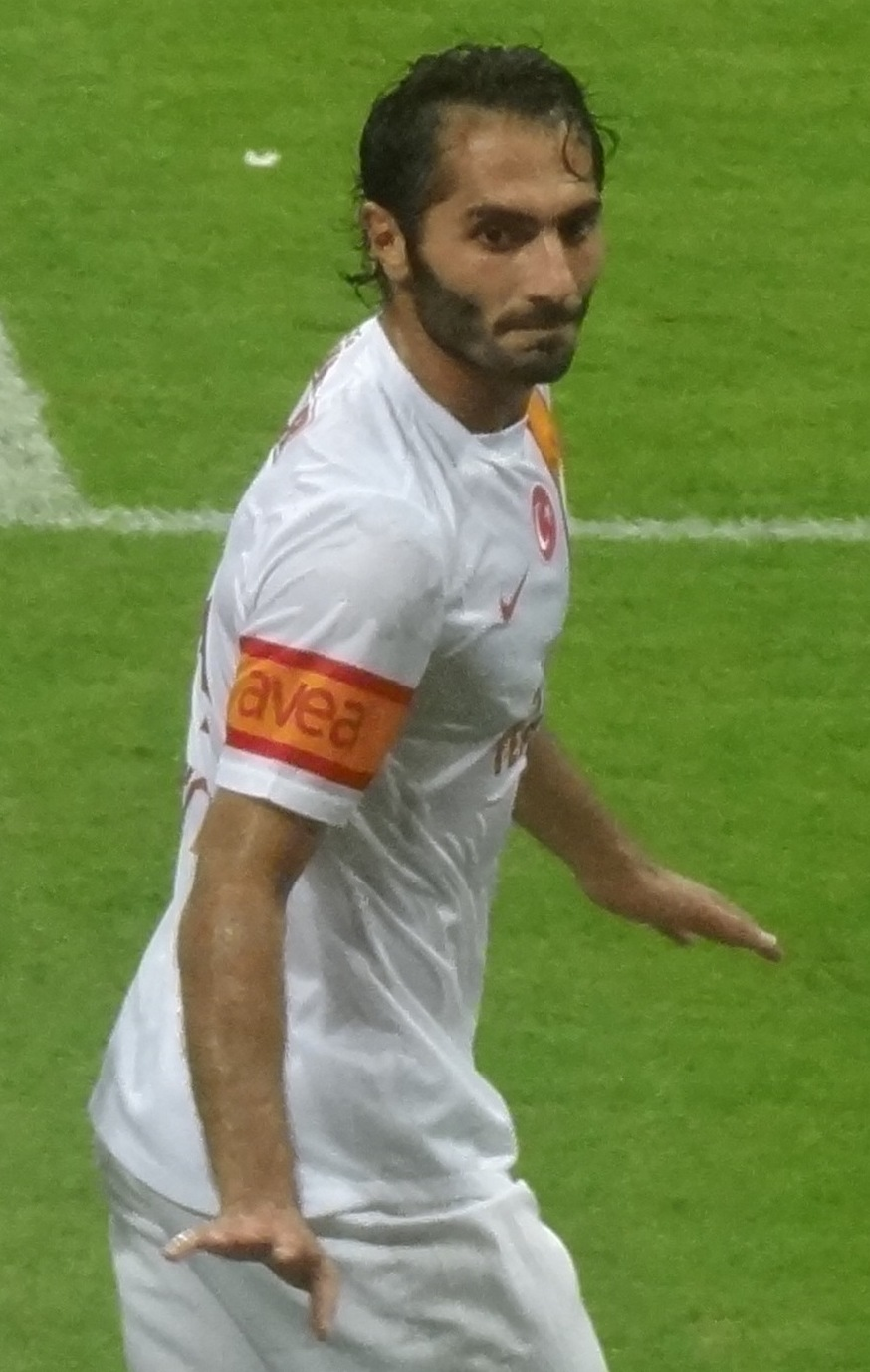
- Altintop playing for Galatasaray in 2012

Personal information
- Full name: Hamit Altıntop
- Date of birth: 8 December 1982 (age 43)
- Place of birth: Gelsenkirchen, West Germany
- Height: 1.83 m (6 ft 0 in)
- Position: Midfielder

Youth career
- 1991–1992: Schwarz-Weiß Gelsenkirchen-Süd
- 1992–1997: TuS Rotthausen
- 1997–2000: Wattenscheid 09

Senior career*
Years	Team	Apps	(Gls)
2000–2003	Wattenscheid 09	75	(12)
2003–2007	Schalke 04	113	(8)
2007–2011	Bayern Munich	63	(7)
2011–2012	Real Madrid	5	(1)
2012–2017	Galatasaray	61	(1)
2017–2018	Darmstadt 98	33	(1)
Total		350	(30)

International career
2000	Turkey U18	5	(3)
2001	Turkey U20	6	(1)
2003	Turkey U21	9	(2)
2004–2014	Turkey	82	(7)
Medal record
Representing Turkey
Men's football
UEFA European Championship
Bronze medal – third place	2008 Austria & Switzerland
- * Club domestic league appearances and goals

Hamit Altıntop (Turkish pronunciation: [haˈmit aɫˈtɯntop]; born 8 December 1982) is a Turkish former professional footballer and current board member of the Turkish Football Federation. He was a versatile midfielder who could play either in a defending or attacking role and on both flanks, known for his creative flair and long-range shooting ability. He is the identical twin brother of footballer Halil Altıntop.

Altıntop was part of the Turkey squad that reached the semi-finals of Euro 2008. After the tournament he was voted as part of the 23-man Team of the tournament awards. He won the 2010 FIFA Puskás Award for scoring the best goal of the season in a UEFA Euro 2012 qualifying match against Kazakhstan in a 3–0 win for his country.

== Club career ==
=== Schalke ===
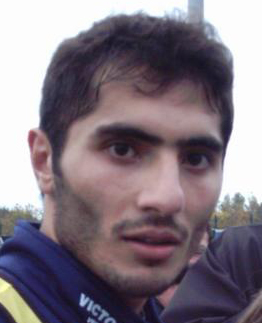
Altıntop with Schalke in 2005

Altıntop started his professional career in local German club Wattenscheid in 2000 along with his brother. As successful performances grabbed the attention of bigger clubs, he was transferred to Schalke 04 in 2003, where he played in a primarily defensive midfield role. In the 2006–07 summer transfer window, Schalke signed his brother Halil from Kaiserslautern. Schalke came second in the Bundesliga, only pipped by VfB Stuttgart by two points.

=== Bayern Munich ===
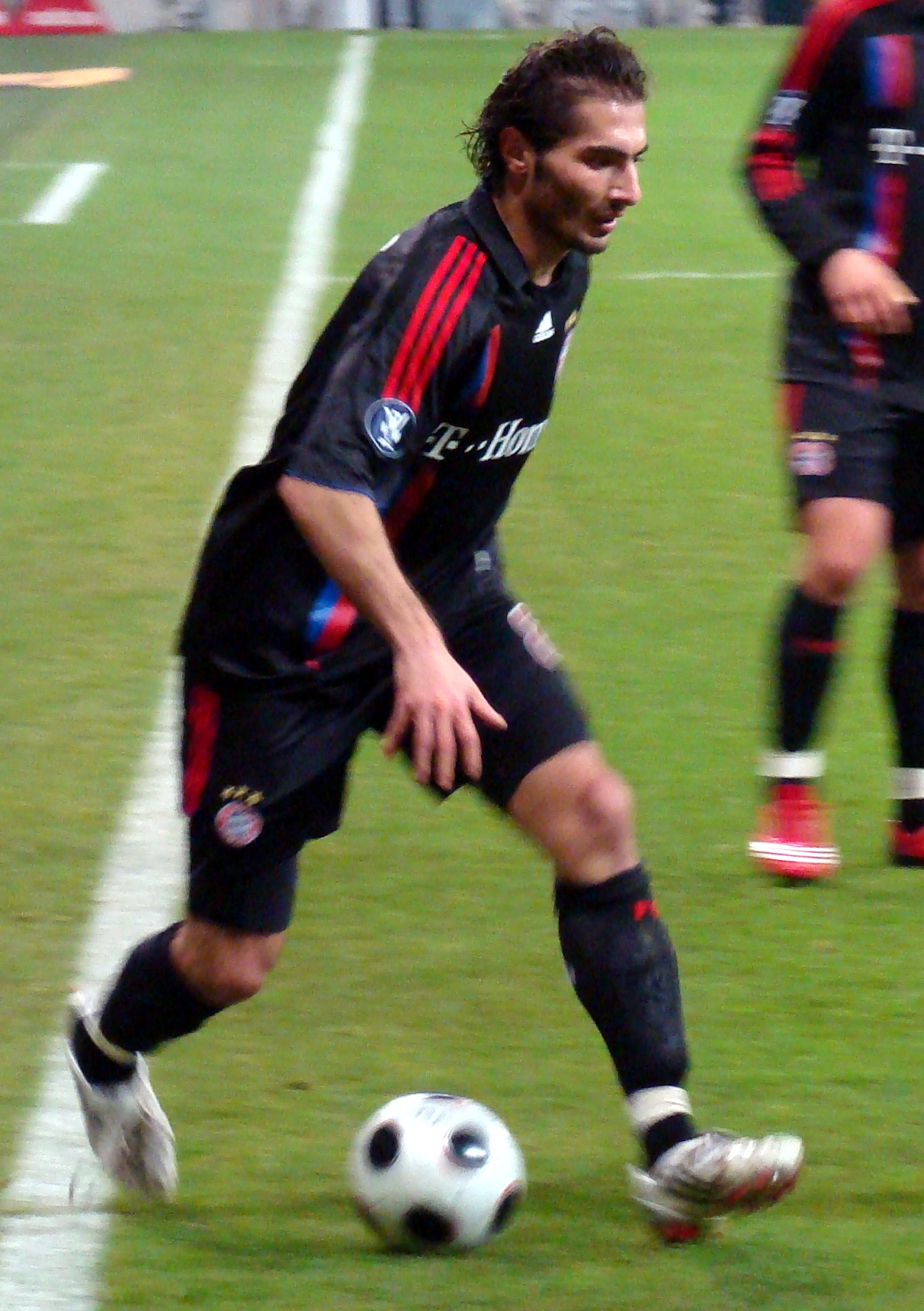
Altıntop playing for Bayern Munich in 2008

Altıntop joined Bayern Munich for the 2007–08 season on a free transfer from Schalke 04. He scored his first goal in his first game for Bayern when they faced the Brazilian champions São Paulo. Munich went on winning the game 2–1 after his spectacular free-kick. Remaining as one of Munich's starters, he scored another left-foot goal out of 30 meters distance against Werder Bremen in the DFL-Ligapokal. Munich completed the match with a 4–1 victory.

Altıntop also scored a controversial penalty against Aberdeen in the first leg of their tie in the UEFA Cup competition on 14 February 2008 at Pittodrie. The initial penalty kick was saved by Aberdeen goalkeeper Jamie Langfield; however, Altıntop scored with the rebound. The match finished 2–2.

In 2009–10 season, Bayern Munich competed in Champions League and they eventually went to 2010 UEFA Champions League Final, which was played at the Santiago Bernabéu Stadium, home of Real Madrid on Saturday, 22 May 2010. He started the match in the first 11, but he was substituted for Miroslav Klose, on 63rd minute.

On 2 June 2010, Altıntop signed a new one-year contract with Bayern Munich. He was eventually released by Bayern during the end of the 2010–11 season, after failing to negotiate an extension to his contract. Thus, he became a free agent.

=== Real Madrid ===
On 19 May 2011, it was announced Altıntop would move on a free transfer to Real Madrid. He signed a four-year contract with the Spanish club. He made his debut for the club on 27 September at the Santiago Bernabéu in a Champions League match against AFC Ajax, coming on in the 84th minute as a replacement for Mesut Özil. He made his La Liga debut for the club on 15 October at the Santiago Bernabéu in a match against Real Betis, coming on in the 78th minute as a replacement for Cristiano Ronaldo. He scored his first goal for the club on 18 December at the Estadio Ramón Sánchez in a match against Sevilla FC on the 89th minute from an assist from Xabi Alonso, coming on in the 86th minute as a replacement for Karim Benzema. He made his first starting debut for the club on 28 January 2012 at the Santiago Bernabéu in a victory over Zaragoza, playing a full match. He made his first Champions League starting debut for the club on 4 April 2012 at the Santiago Bernabéu in a 2011–12 Champions League quarter-finals match against APOEL F.C., playing a full match.

=== Galatasaray ===
On 13 July 2012, he signed a four-year contract with the Galatasaray SK for €3.5 million from Real Madrid. Altıntop would earn €2.4 million per-season in 2012–13 and 2013–14 in addition to a €20,000 per-match bonus. He made his Galatasaray debut on 12 August 2012 in the 2012 Turkish Super Cup final against the Turkish Cup Champions Fenerbahçe. Galatasaray won 3–2, winning the title for the 12th time. He made his Süper Lig debut the following week against Kasımpaşa. Altıntop's first goal for Galatasaray was a 30-meter free kick in the 37th minute of a Champions League defeat of former club Schalke 04 on 12 March 2013. Altintop failed to appear in Galatasaray's first 18 squad due to injuries during most of 2015 and 2016. He started reappearing in cup games. However, due to a disastrous performance against a second division club Tuzlaspor and the criticism of the supporters, the club decided to terminate his contract.

=== Darmstadt 98 ===
On 31 January 2017, Altıntop signed a season long contract with Darmstadt 98. He was named the best player of the 20th matchday by the Bundesliga after contributing in major fashion to a surprise win against Borussia Dortmund. He parted ways with the club on 4 January 2018 for personal reasons and moved to Turkey with his family.

== International career ==
Altıntop played in all five of Turkey's matches at UEFA Euro 2008. He assisted all three goals in the comeback against the Czech Republic and scored the third penalty in the quarter-final shoot-out against Croatia, which Turkey won 3–1. After goalkeeper Rüştü Reçber saved the next Croatian penalty, Turkey advanced to the semi-finals against Germany. Turkish coach Fatih Terim used Altıntop as a right defender in the first two matches before moving him into midfield for the remainder of the tournament. He was awarded the Carlsberg Man of the Match award following the quarter-final against Croatia. At the conclusion of the tournament, Altıntop was selected for UEFA's official 23-man "Team of the Tournament".

In January 2011, Altıntop won the FIFA Puskás Award for the best goal of 2010 for his volley against Kazakhstan in September 2010 during a UEFA Euro 2012 qualifying match.

He captained the national team for the first time on 30 March 2011 in a 2–0 victory against Austria.

=== Post-playing career ===
Following his retirement from professional football, Altıntop became involved in football administration. He served as a board member of the Turkish Football Federation (TFF) responsible for the national teams and was involved in the federation's preparations for UEFA Euro 2024. He left the TFF in 2024 following the election of a new federation administration.

In 2024, Altıntop was also appointed as a member of UEFA's National Team Competitions Committee for the 2023–25/27 cycle.

== Managerial career ==
In 2018, one year after his retirement from professional, he was elected as a board of directors member of the Turkish Football Federation.

== Personal life ==
In 2014, Altıntop married Feyza Veli in a wedding ceremony in Istanbul's renowned Çırağan Palace.

Altintop was nominated as the 2023 UEFA Champions League Final ambassador, since the final was held at Atatürk Olympic Stadium in Istanbul.

== Career statistics ==
=== Club ===
Appearances and goals by club, season and competition
Club	Season	League			National cup (Note: Includes DFB-Pokal, Copa del Rey, Turkish Cup)		Europe		Other		Total	
Club	Season	Division	Apps	Goals	Apps	Goals	Apps	Goals	Apps	Goals	Apps	Goals
Wattenscheid 09	2000–01	Regionalliga Nord	11	1	—		—		—		11	1
Wattenscheid 09	2001–02	Regionalliga Nord	31	4	—		—		—		31	4
Wattenscheid 09	2002–03	Regionalliga Nord	33	7	—		—		—		33	7
Wattenscheid 09	Total		75	12	—		—		—		75	12
Schalke 04	2003–04	Bundesliga	30	5	0	0	2 (Note: Appearances in UEFA Cup)	1	—		33	5
Schalke 04	2004–05	Bundesliga	30	0	6	1	8	—		0	44	1
Schalke 04	2005–06	Bundesliga	22	1	2	0	9	1	2 (Note: Appearances in DFL-Ligapokal)	0	35	2
Schalke 04	2006–07	Bundesliga	31	2	2	0	2	0	2	0	37	2
Schalke 04	Total		113	8	10	1	21	2	4	0	148	10
Bayern Munich	2007–08	Bundesliga	23	3	5	1	9	3	3	1	40	8
Bayern Munich	2008–09	Bundesliga	11	2	3	0	4 (Note: Appearances in UEFA Champions League)	0	—		18	2
Bayern Munich	2009–10	Bundesliga	15	0	5	1	6	0	—		26	1
Bayern Munich	2010–11	Bundesliga	14	2	3	0	7	0	1 (Note: Appearance in DFL-Supercup)	0	25	2
Bayern Munich	Total		63	7	16	2	26	3	4	1	109	13
Real Madrid	2011–12	La Liga	5	1	3	0	4	0	0	0	12	1
Galatasaray	2012–13	Süper Lig	29	0	1	0	9	1	11 (Note: Appearance in Turkish Super Cup)	0	40	1
Galatasaray	2013–14	Süper Lig	5	0	2	0	0	0	1	0	8	0
Galatasaray	2014–15	Süper Lig	23	1	4	1	5	0	0	0	32	2
Galatasaray	2015–16	Süper Lig	0	0	0	0	0	0	0	0	0	0
Galatasaray	2016–17	Süper Lig	4	0	5	1	—		0	0	9	1
Galatasaray	Total		61	1	12	2	14	1	2	0	89	4
Darmstadt 98	2016–17	Bundesliga	16	0	—		—		—		16	0
Darmstadt 98	2017–18	2. Bundesliga	17	1	1	0	—		—		18	1
Darmstadt 98	Total		33	1	1	0	—		—		34	1
Career total			350	30	42	5	66	6	10	1	468	42

=== International ===
Turkey
Year	Apps	Goals
2004	6	0
2005	10	0
2006	11	0
2007	11	2
2008	9	0
2009	6	1
2010	9	3
2011	6	0
2012	9	1
2013	3	0
2014	2	0
Total	82	7

Scores and results table. Turkey's goal tally first:

International goals
No.	Date	Venue	Opponent	Score	Result	Competition
1	28 March 2007	Commerzbank-Arena, Frankfurt, Germany	Norway	1–2	2–2	UEFA Euro 2008 qualifying
2	28 March 2007	Commerzbank-Arena, Frankfurt, Germany	Norway	2–2	2–2	UEFA Euro 2008 qualifying
3	12 August 2009	Lobanovsky Dynamo Stadium, Kyiv, Ukraine	Ukraine	3–0	3–0	Friendly
4	3 March 2010	BJK İnönü Stadium, Istanbul, Turkey	Honduras	2–0	2–0	Friendly
5	3 September 2010	Astana Arena, Astana, Kazakhstan	Kazakhstan	2–0	3–0	UEFA Euro 2012 qualifying
6	7 September 2010	Şükrü Saracoğlu Stadium, Istanbul, Turkey	Belgium	1–1	3–2	UEFA Euro 2012 qualifying
7	24 May 2012	Red Bull Arena, Salzburg, Austria	Georgia	1–0	3–1	Friendly

== Honours ==
=== Club ===
Schalke 04

- DFL-Ligapokal: 2005
- UEFA Intertoto Cup: 2003, 2004

Bayern Munich

- Bundesliga: 2007–08, 2009–10
- DFB-Pokal: 2007–08, 2009–10
- DFL-Ligapokal: 2007
- DFL-Supercup: 2010
- UEFA Champions League runner-up: 2009–10

Real Madrid

- La Liga: 2011–12

Galatasaray

- Süper Lig: 2012–13, 2014–15
- Turkish Cup: 2013–14, 2014–15
- Turkish Super Cup: 2012, 2013, 2016

=== International ===
Turkey

- UEFA European Championship bronze medalist: 2008

=== Individual ===
- kicker Bundesliga Team of the Season: 2005–06
- FIFA Puskás Award: 2010
- UEFA European Championship Team of the Tournament: 2008
- UEFA European Championship top assist provider: 2008
