= Marsberg =

- Town
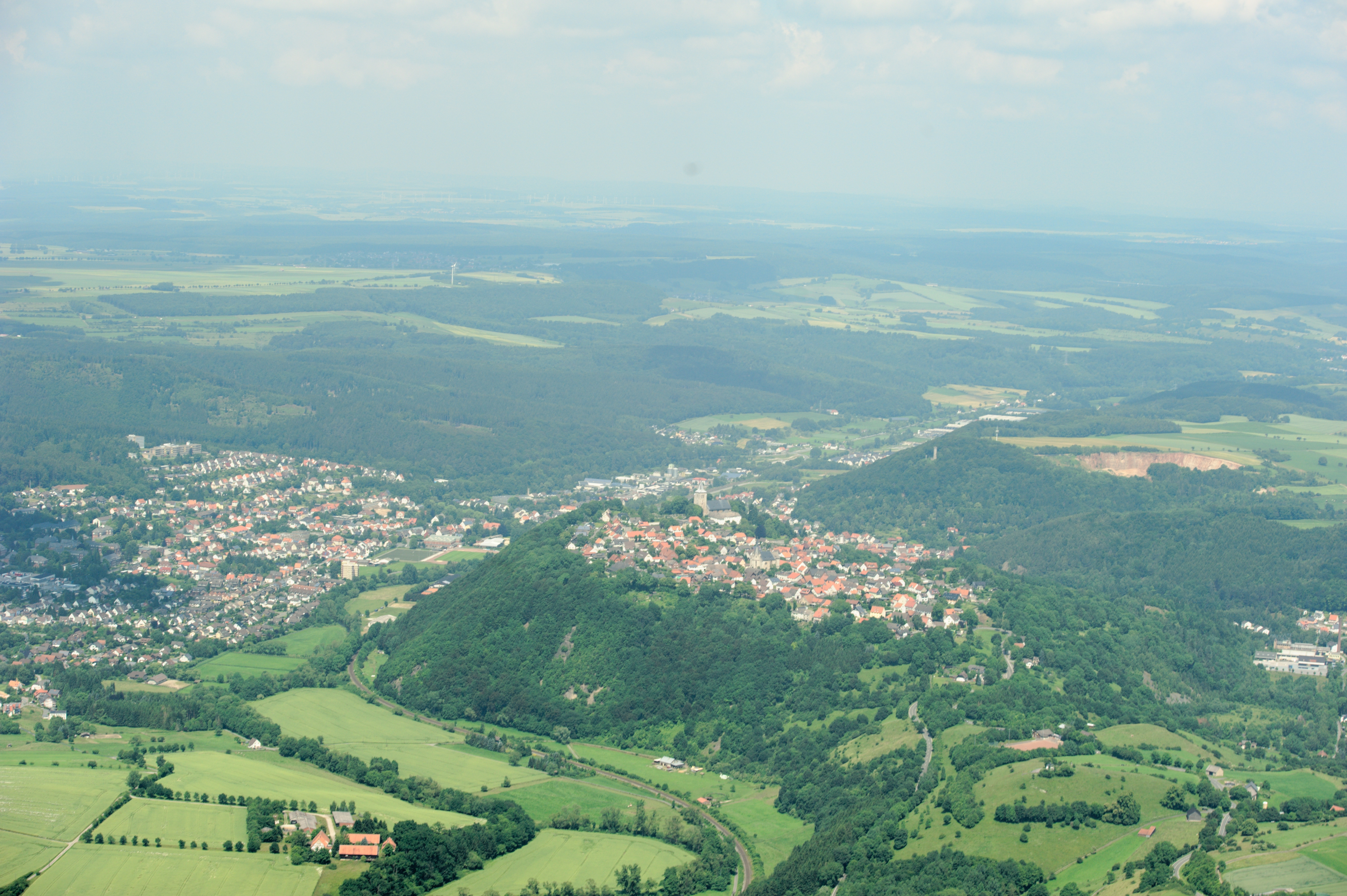

- Coat of arms

- Location of Marsberg within Hochsauerlandkreis district
- Interactive map of Marsberg
- Location within Germany Location within North Rhine-Westphalia
- Coordinates: 51°27′N 08°50′E
- Country: Germany
- State: North Rhine-Westphalia
- Admin. region: Arnsberg
- District: Hochsauerlandkreis
- Subdivisions: 17

Government
  - Mayor (2020–25): Thomas Schröder (CDU)

Area
  - Total: 182.22 km^{2} (70.36 sq mi)
- Elevation: 200–600 m (660–1,970 ft)

Population (2025-12-31)
  - Total: 19,368
  - Density: 106.29/km^{2} (275.29/sq mi)
- Time zone: UTC+01:00 (CET)
  - Summer (DST): UTC+02:00 (CEST)
- Postal codes: 34431
- Dialling codes: 02992 (Marsberg); 02991 (Bredelar); 02993 (Canstein); 02994 (Westheim)
- Vehicle registration: HSK
- Website: marsberg.de

Marsberg (German: [ˈmaʁsˌbɛʁk]) is a town in the Hochsauerland district, in North Rhine-Westphalia, Germany.

== History ==
Although its origins are obscure, Marsberg was a prospering town by the 13th century (it was even minting coins). It was a free city until 1807, when it was incorporated into the Kingdom of Westphalia, until 1813. After two years of independent government, it was added to Prussia in 1815.

== Geography ==
It is situated on the river Diemel, approx. 20 km east of Brilon and 30 km south of Paderborn.

=== Neighbouring municipalities ===
- Bad Arolsen
- Bad Wünnenberg
- Brilon
- Diemelsee
- Diemelstadt
- Lichtenau
- Warburg

=== Town division ===
Marsberg consists of the following 17 districts:

- Beringhausen
- Borntosten
- Bredelar
- Canstein
- Erlinghausen
- Essentho
- Giershagen
- Heddinghausen
- Helminghausen
- Leitmar
- Meerhof
- Niedermarsberg
- Obermarsberg
- Oesdorf
- Padberg
- Udorf
- Westheim

== Population ==
Historical population

Year	Pop.	±% p.a.
1965	22,838	—
1970	22,694	−0.13%
1975	22,265	−0.38%
1980	22,072	−0.17%
1985	21,517	−0.51%
1990	21,124	−0.37%
1995	23,058	+1.77%

Year	Pop.	±% p.a.
2000	22,475	−0.51%
2005	21,849	−0.56%
2010	20,800	−0.98%
2015	19,968	−0.81%
2020	19,488	−0.49%
2025	19,368	−0.12%

Source: Landesdatabank Nordrhein-Westfalen

== International relations ==
Marsberg is twinned with:

- Lillers (France)
- Rustenburg (South Africa)

Site of the Carolus-Magnum Gymnasium where on 26 April 2026 Chancellor Frederic Merz offered a scathing criticism of US foreign policy with Iran.

== Notable people ==
- Lissy Ishag (born 1979), television presenter
- Hubertus Klenner (born 1959), mayor of Marsberg 2004–2014
- Hermann Köhler (born 1950), athlete and Olympic athlete
- Fabian Lamotte (born 1983), footballer
- Peter Lohmeyer (born 1962), actor
- Hans-Joachim Watzke (born 1959), managing director of Borussia Dortmund

== Image gallery ==
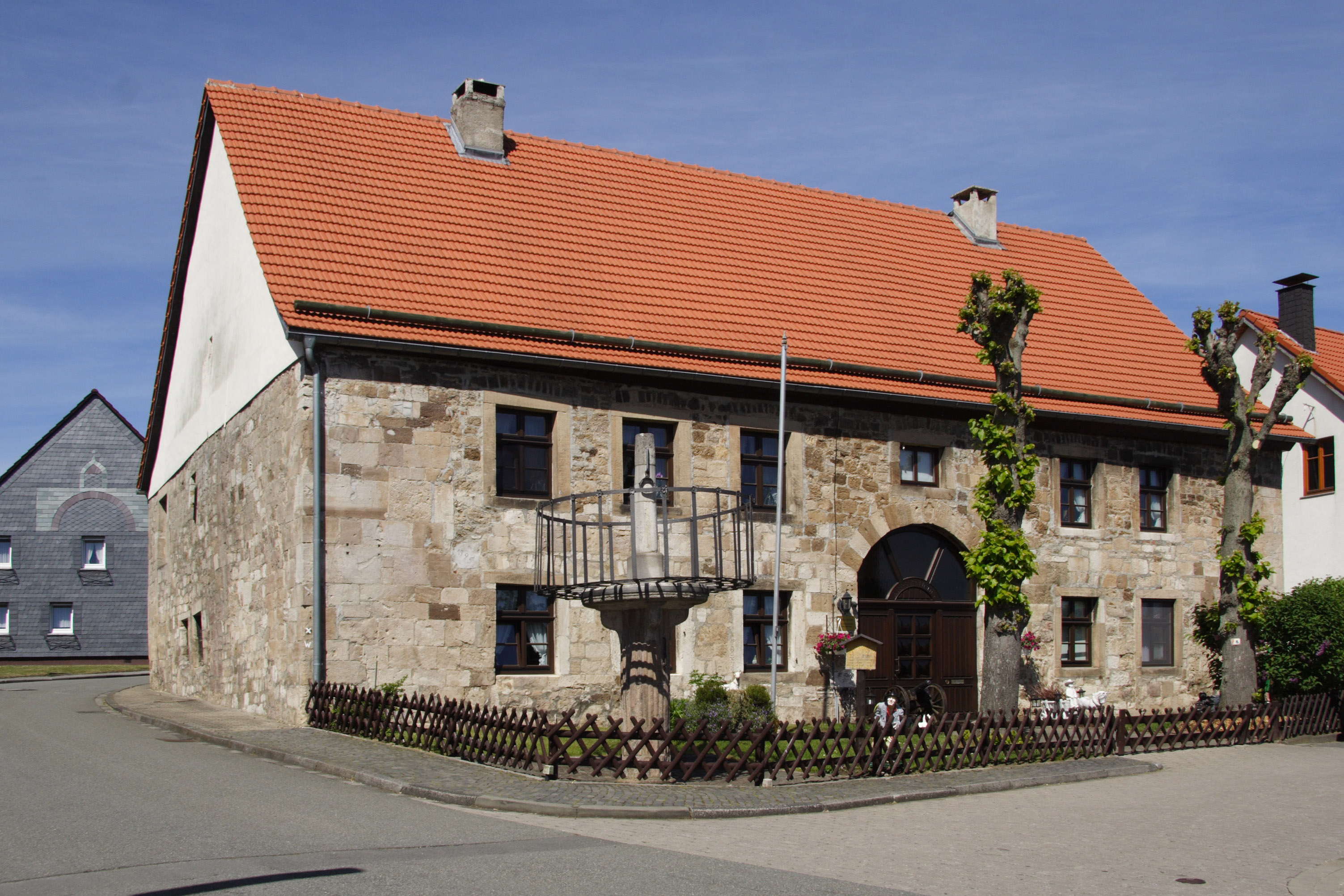
Old townhall in Obermarsberg

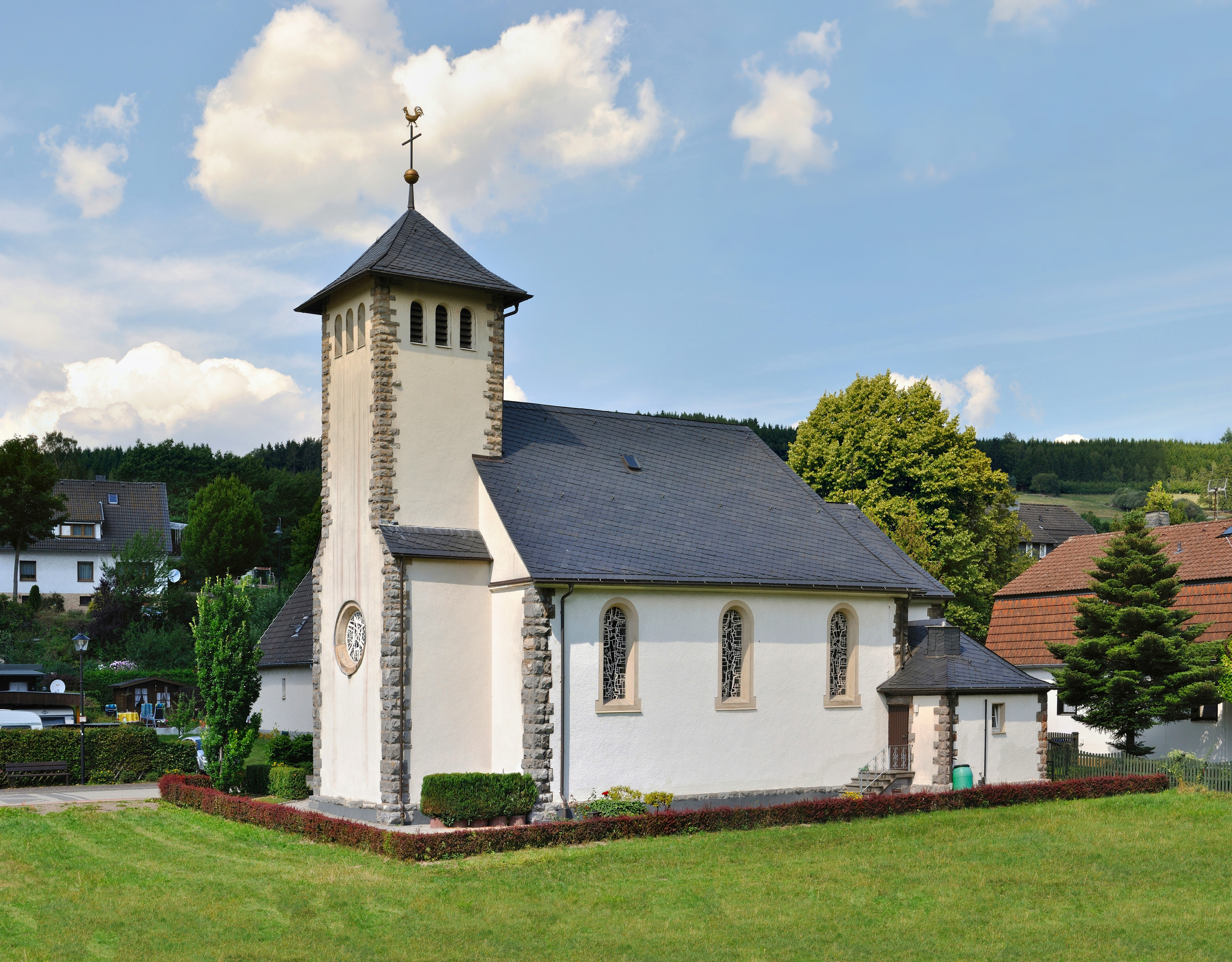
The Catholic church of Helminghausen, in southwestern Marsberg

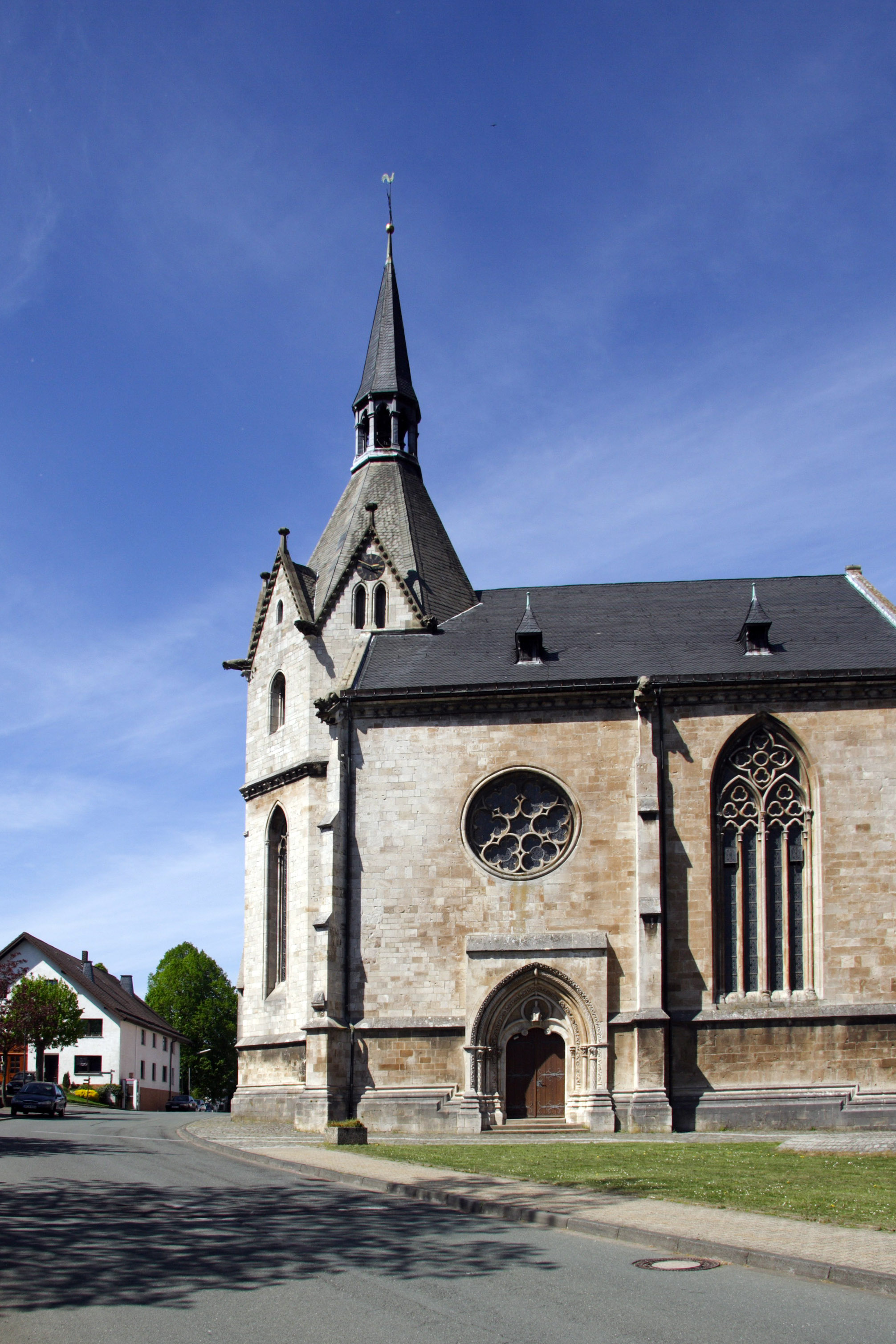
Nikolai church in Obermarsberg

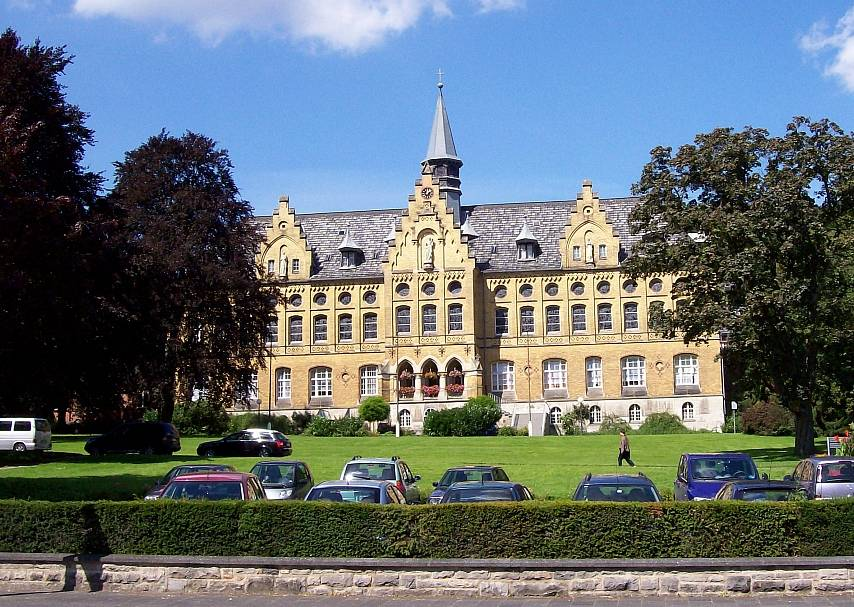
St.-Johannes monastery
