= Hermann Nattkämper =

German footballer

Personal information
- Full name: Hermann Nattkämper
- Date of birth: 4 October 1911
- Date of death: 2 April 2005 (aged 93)
- Position: Defender

Senior career*
Years	Team	Apps	(Gls)
1928–1930	Preußen Gladbeck		
1930–1936	Schalke 04		
1936–1937	Preußen Gladbeck		
- * Club domestic league appearances and goals

Herman Nattkämper (4 October 1911 – 2 April 2005) was a German football player who most notably was German champion with FC Schalke 04 in 1934 and 1935.

== Career ==
Born in Gladbeck, he became a member of a local football club, Preußen Gladbeck, when he was 14. Tenbrink, the manager of the club, criticized Nattkämper for giving away a penalty. Due to this, he left his club and joined Schalke, where he was attributed to the rise of the club. He helped Schalke win their first football championship in 1934, then won it again in 1935, resulting in Schalke winning back-to-back championships. However, he could not focus on football as his job as a city official and helping his family's drink business was more important. Therefore, he left Schalke after 27 goals in 44 matches. During World War II, Nattkämper was held captive by Russian troops. In captivity, Nattkämper played some matches for a Danzig team. Following his release in 1948, he stated "football was physically out of the question".

== Personal life ==
Nattkämper married his wife Hildegard in 1939, and lived with her in retirement in Gladbeck until his death in 2005.
