= Waldemar Gerhardt =

German footballer (1939–2026)

Personal information
- Date of birth: 6 January 1939
- Place of birth: Gelsenkirchen, Gau Westphalia-North, Germany
- Date of death: 30 October 2026 (aged 87)
- Height: 1.77 m (5 ft 10 in)
- Position: Forward

Youth career
- –1957: Schalke 04

Senior career*
Years	Team	Apps	(Gls)
1957–1965	Schalke 04	147	(61)
1965–1969	Fortuna Düsseldorf	92	(42)
- * Club domestic league appearances and goals

Waldemar Gerhardt (6 January 1939 – 30 October 2026) was a German footballer who played as a forward for Schalke 04 and Fortuna Düsseldorf. He scored 32 goals in 82 matches in the Bundesliga. Gerhardt died on 30 October 2026, at the age of 87.
