= Thomas Kläsener =

German footballer

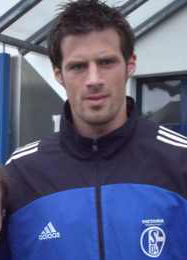
- Kläsener with FC Schalke 04

Personal information
- Date of birth: 14 August 1976 (age 50)
- Place of birth: Gelsenkirchen, West Germany
- Height: 1.87 m (6 ft 2 in)
- Position: Defender

Youth career
- 1984–1990: Resse 08
- 1990–1996: Erler SV

Senior career*
Years	Team	Apps	(Gls)
1996–2000	Schalke 04 II		
2000–2001	SG Wattenscheid 09	15	(1)
2001–2006	Schalke 04 II	86	(12)
2003–2006	Schalke 04	32	(1)
2006–2007	Rot-Weiss Essen	33	(1)
2007–2008	SC Paderborn	13	(1)
2008–2009	FC Augsburg	17	(0)
2009–2011	RB Leipzig	56	(6)
2011–2013	SSV Markranstädt		
- * Club domestic league appearances and goals

Thomas Kläsener (born 14 August 1976 in Gelsenkirchen) is a German former professional footballer who played as a defender.

== Honours ==
- UEFA Cup: 1996–97
- DFB-Pokal: 2001–02; runners-up 2004–05
- Bundesliga runners-up: 2004–05
- DFL-Ligapokal: 2005
- UEFA Intertoto Cup: 2004
