= Michael Delura =

German footballer

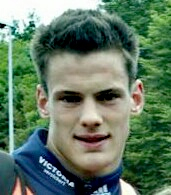
- Michael Delura

Personal information
- Date of birth: 1 July 1985 (age 41)
- Place of birth: Gelsenkirchen, West Germany
- Height: 1.91 m (6 ft 3 in)
- Position: Midfielder

Youth career
- 1991–1993: DJK Falke Gelsenkirchen
- 1993–1994: VfB Gelsenkirchen
- 1994–1999: SG Wattenscheid 09
- 1999–2003: Schalke 04

Senior career*
Years	Team	Apps	(Gls)
2002–2004	Schalke 04 II	36	(8)
2003–2007	Schalke 04	23	(4)
2005–2006	→ Hannover 96 (loan)	25	(1)
2006–2007	→ Mönchengladbach (loan)	28	(3)
2007–2009	Panionios	15	(3)
2009–2011	Arminia Bielefeld	17	(1)
2012–2013	VfL Bochum	17	(0)
Total		161	(20)

International career
2003	Germany U-18	2	(1)
2003–2004	Germany U-19	8	(4)
2004–2006	Germany U-20	17	(3)
- * Club domestic league appearances and goals

Michael Delura (born 1 July 1985) is a German former professional footballer who played as a midfielder.

== Early life ==
Born in Gelsenkirchen, Delura attended the Gesamtschule Berger Feld.

== Career ==
Delura joined Schalke 04 when he was 14 years old and made his Bundesliga debut for Schalke 04 in 2003. He was loaned to Hannover 96 and Borussia Mönchengladbach in seasons 2005–06 and 2006–07 respectively. Delura has played more than 70 Bundesliga matches until July 2013.

Delura joined Greek club Panionios for a three-year deal on an undisclosed fee on 1 August 2007. He signed then on 4 June 2009 with Arminia Bielefeld a contract until 30 June 2011.

Delura is a former German youth international.

== Career statistics ==
Appearances and goals by club, season and competition
Club	Season	League			Cup		Continental		Total		Ref.
Club	Season	Division	Apps	Goals	Apps	Goals	Apps	Goals	Apps	Goals	Ref.
Schalke 04 II	2002–03	Oberliga Westfalen	8	2	—		—		8	2	
Schalke 04 II	2003–04	Regionalliga Nord	18	3	—		—		18	3	
Schalke 04 II	2004–05	Oberliga Westfalen	8	3	—		—		8	3	
Schalke 04 II	Total		34	8	—		—		34	8	—
Schalke 04	2003–04	Bundesliga	15	4	0	0	1 (Note: Appearances in the 2003–04 UEFA Cup.)	0	16	4	
Schalke 04	2004–05	Bundesliga	8	0	2	0	4 (Note: Two appearances in the 2004 UEFA Intertoto Cup and two appearances in the 2004–05 UEFA Cup.)	0	14	0	
Schalke 04	Total		23	4	2	0	5	0	30	4	—
Hannover (loan)	2005–06	Bundesliga	25	1	2	0	—		27	1	
Borussia Mönchengladbach (loan)	2006–07	Bundesliga	28	3	2	1	—		30	4	
Panionios	2008–09	Super League Greece	15	3	3	0	2 (Note: Appearances in the 2008–09 UEFA Cup.)	0	20	3	
Arminia Bielefeld	2009–10	2. Bundesliga	16	1	1	0	—		17	1	
Arminia Bielefeld	2010–11	2. Bundesliga	1	0	0	0	—		1	0	
Arminia Bielefeld	Total		17	1	1	0	—		18	1	—
VfL Bochum	2011–12	2. Bundesliga	3	0	0	0	—		3	0	
VfL Bochum	2012–13	2. Bundesliga	14	0	1	0	—		15	0	
VfL Bochum	Total		17	0	1	0	—		18	0	—
Career total			159	20	11	1	7	0	177	21	—

== Honours ==
Schalke 04

- DFB-Pokal runner-up: 2004–05
- UEFA Intertoto Cup: 2004
