= Abdul Iyodo =

Nigerian footballer

Personal information
- Date of birth: 10 October 1979 (age 47)
- Place of birth: Kano, Nigeria
- Height: 1.74 m (5 ft 9 in)
- Position: Striker

Senior career*
Years	Team	Apps	(Gls)
–1996	Kano Pillars		
1996–1999	FC Martigues		
1999–2002	SG Wattenscheid 09	79	(36)
2002–2004	Schalke 04	4	(0)
2002–2004	Schalke 04 II	58	(30)
2004–2005	Karlsruher SC	7	(0)
2005–2006	SG Wattenscheid 09	32	(20)
2006–2009	SV Elversberg	67	(8)
- * Club domestic league appearances and goals

Abdul Iyodo (born 10 October 1979) is a Nigerian former professional footballer who played as a striker.

== Career ==
Iyodo started his senior career with Kano Pillars. He first moved to Europe in 1996 joining French club FC Martigues. In 1999, he signed with German club SG Wattenscheid 09 where he scored 36 goals in three years and attracted offers from professional clubs in 2002. After a move to FC St. Pauli fell through, he joined Schalke 04's reserves. At Schalke he had disciplinary problems and made six appearances for the first team.

After that, he played for German clubs Karlsruher SC, SG Wattenscheid 09, and SV Elversberg. In December 2008, Elversberg announced Iyodo was free to find a new club. After the 2008–09 season, he played for the club's reserve team.

From 2010 he played for lower-league clubs CSV Bochum-Linden, Holzwickeder SC, SG Wattenscheid 09 II, SW Eppendorf, 1. SG Regental, and TSV Nittenau.
