= Niels Oude Kamphuis =

Dutch footballer

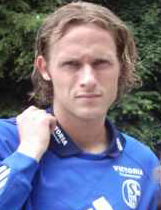

Personal information
- Full name: Niels Oude Kamphuis
- Date of birth: 14 November 1977 (age 48)
- Place of birth: Hengelo, Netherlands
- Height: 1.79 m (5 ft 10 in)
- Position: Midfielder

Youth career
- 1983–1991: NEO Borne
- 1991–1994: Twente

Senior career*
Years	Team	Apps	(Gls)
1994–1999	Twente	126	(7)
1999–2005	Schalke 04	134	(8)
2005–2006	Borussia Mönchengladbach	12	(0)
2006–2007	Twente	6	(0)
Total		278	(15)

International career
2001	Netherlands	1	(0)
- * Club domestic league appearances and goals

Niels Oude Kamphuis (Dutch pronunciation: [nils ˌʌudə ˈkɑmpɦœys]; born 14 November 1977) is a retired Dutch footballer. He is best remembered for his time at Schalke 04. He operated mostly as a defensive midfielder.

Oude Kamphuis was originally a midfielder, but could also double up as a defender. He started his career at FC Twente, where he spent five years, before leaving for German side, FC Schalke 04. After Schalke, Oude Kamphuis joined Borussia Mönchengladbach, another German-based side. He ended his playing football career at FC Twente, because of long term injuries.

== Club career ==
=== FC Twente ===
Oude Kamphuis was born in Hengelo. As a teenager, he joined FC Twente, the Dutch club to which he would return twelve years later. At Twente, he earned 126 caps over the course of the five seasons he was there. In that time, he scored seven goals from defence.

=== Schalke 04 ===
Oude Kamphuis spent his first season with German Bundesliga team, FC Schalke 04, during their 1999–2000 campaign. With the Gelsenkirchen club, he earned over 120 appearances, securing eight goals over the course of, again, five years.

=== Borussia Mönchengladbach ===
On 30 May 2005, Niels joined fellow Bundesliga side, Borussia Mönchengladbach. He signed on a free transfer with the club. Niels' transfer was met with excitement at Borussia Mönchengladbach, especially within the board. Director of sport, Peter Pander said that Mönchengladbach had "a strong, versatile and internationally-experienced player". He added "I am sure we will be stronger with him."

=== Return to Twente ===
After requesting that, for family reasons, he return to his native Netherlands, Borussia Mönchengladbach allowed the Dutchman permanent leave. Oude Kamphuis then re-signed for Twente on 16 August 2006, having spent five years as a youth there. The rules of football stated that Twente were not required to pay a fee for Niels, as he was a free agent.

== International career ==
He played once for the Netherlands national football team in a friendly against England in 2001.

== Honours ==
Schalke 04

- UEFA Intertoto Cup: 2004
