= Fabian Lamotte =

German footballer (born 1983)

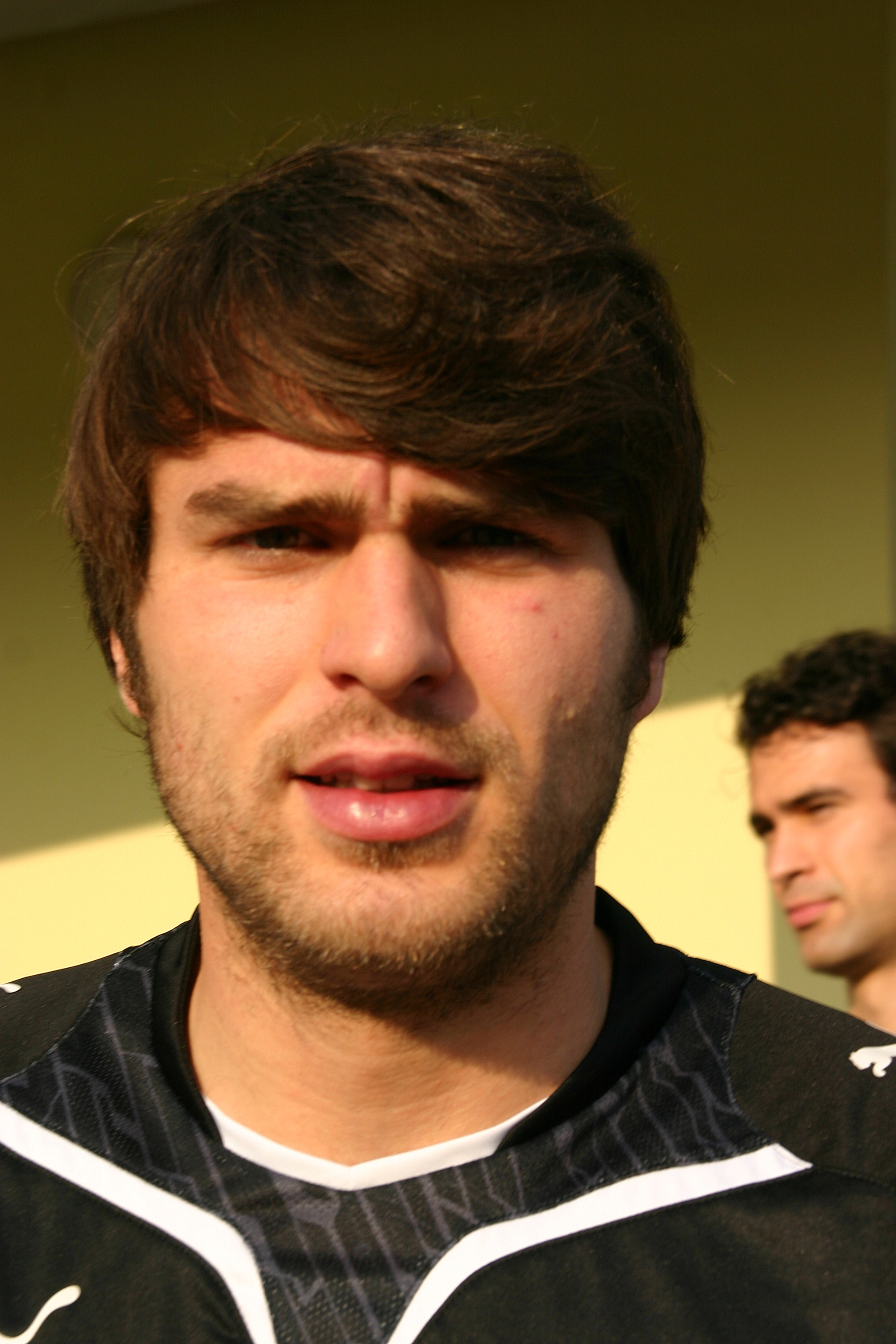
- Lamotte in 2009

Personal information
- Date of birth: 25 February 1983 (age 43)
- Place of birth: Marsberg, West Germany
- Height: 1.80 m (5 ft 11 in)
- Position: Right-back

Youth career
- 1989–1998: TuS Hesperinghausen
- 1998–2002: Schalke 04

Senior career*
| Years | Team | Apps | (Gls) |
| 2002–2005 | Schalke 04 | 10 | (1) |
| 2005–2006 | 1860 Munich | 26 | (0) |
| 2007–2010 | Sturm Graz | 93 | (2) |
| 2012 | Viktoria Berlin | 2 | (0) |
| Total | | 131 | (3) |
- * Club domestic league appearances and goals

Fabian Lamotte (born 25 February 1983) is a German former professional footballer who played as a right-back.

== Career ==
After being released by Sturm Graz upon the expiration of his contract in 2010, Lamotte trained with Hertha BSC II to keep fit while searching for a club.

He tore his achilles tendon before signing with Viktoria Berlin in February 2012, making two appearances in the NOFV-Oberliga until the summer.

On 11 June 2012, it was announced he would join Regionalliga Südwest side KSV Hessen Kassel on a two-year contract. Four days later, however, the move was called off.

== Honours ==
Schalke 04

- DFB-Pokal runner-up: 2004–05
- UEFA Intertoto Cup: 2004

Sturm Graz

- Austrian Cup: 2009–10
