= 1999–2000 SSV Ulm 1846 season =

SSV Ulm 1846
1999–2000 season
- Manager: Martin Andermatt
- Stadium: Donaustadion
- 1. Bundesliga: 16th (relegated)
- DFB-Pokal: Fourth round
- Top goalscorer: League: Hans van de Haar (10); All: Hans van de Haar (12)

The 1999–2000 season was the first time SSV Ulm 1846 played in the 1. Bundesliga, the highest tier of the German football league system. After 34 league games, SSV Ulm finished in 16th place, and were relegated back to the 2. Fußball-Bundesliga. The club reached the fourth round of the DFB-Pokal; losing 2–1 away to Werder Bremen. Hans van de Haar was the club's top goal scorer, with 12 goals in all competitions.

== First team squad ==
Squad at end of season

No.	Pos.	Nation	Player
1	GK	GER	Philipp Laux
2	DF	GER	Marco Konrad
3	DF	GER	Frank Kinkel
4	DF	GER	Joachim Stadler
5	DF	GER	Uwe Grauer
6	MF	GER	Oliver Otto
7	MF	GER	Markus Pleuler
8	DF	HUN	Tamás Bódog
9	FW	NED	Hans van de Haar
10	MF	POL	Janusz Góra
11	FW	YUG	Dragan Trkulja
14	DF	HUN	Janos Radoki
15	DF	GER	Oliver Unsöld
16	MF	GER	Thomas Motzke

No.	Pos.	Nation	Player
17	GK	GER	Oliver Tuzyna
18	MF	GER	Rainer Scharinger
19	MF	GER	Bernd Maier
20	FW	GER	Sascha Rösler
21	DF	ANG	Rui Marques
22	MF	TRI	Evans Wise
23	FW	AUS	David Zdrilic
25	MF	GER	Ralf Zimmermann
26	MF	TUR	Ünal Demirkiran
27	MF	GER	Udo Schrötter
28	MF	GER	Marco Mangold
29	DF	GER	Klaus Mirwald
30	GK	GER	Holger Betz
33	FW	BRA	Leandro Fonseca

== Competitions ==
=== Bundesliga ===
==== League table ====
Pos	Team	Pld	W	D	L	GF	GA	GD	Pts	Qualification or relegation
14	Eintracht Frankfurt (Note: Eintracht Frankfurt were docked two points because of licensing irregularities.)	34	12	5	17	42	44	−2	39 (Note: Head-to-head was used as a tie-breaker between Schalke 04 and Frankfurt.)	
15	Hansa Rostock	34	8	14	12	44	60	−16	38	
16	SSV Ulm 1846 (R)	34	9	8	17	36	62	−26	35	Relegation to 2. Bundesliga
17	Arminia Bielefeld (R)	34	7	9	18	40	61	−21	30	Relegation to 2. Bundesliga
18	MSV Duisburg (R)	34	4	10	20	37	71	−34	22	Relegation to 2. Bundesliga

Source: www.dfb.de
Rules for classification: 1) points; 2) goal difference; 3) number of goals scored.
(R) Relegated

==== Results ====
15 August 1999 1	SSV Ulm 1846	1–1	SC Freiburg	Ulm
17:30 CEST	Góra 48' (pen.)	Report	Grauer 2' (o.g.)	Stadium: Donaustadion; Attendance: 22,000; Referee: Lutz Michael Fröhlich

21 August 1999 2	1860 Munich	4–1	SSV Ulm 1846	Munich
15:30 CEST	Max 19', 25'; Häßler 23' (pen.); Paßlack 31'	Report	Unsöld 17'	Stadium: Olympiastadion; Attendance: 44,000; Referee: Florian Meyer

29 August 1999 3	SSV Ulm 1846	0–1	Borussia Dortmund	Ulm
17:30 CEST		Report	Bobic 12'	Stadium: Donaustadion; Attendance: 22,500; Referee: Torsten Koop

10 September 1999 4	Hansa Rostock	2–1	SSV Ulm 1846	Rostock
20:00 CEST	Oswald 4'; Agali 90'	Report	Góra 80'	Stadium: Ostseestadion; Attendance: 20,000; Referee: Herbert Fandel

18 September 1999 5	SSV Ulm 1846	2–0	Arminia Bielefeld	Ulm
15:30 CEST	Zdrillic 15'; Scharinger 28'	Report		Stadium: Donaustadion; Attendance: 19,500; Referee: Hartmut Strampe

25 September 1999 6	Werder Bremen	2–2	SSV Ulm 1846	Bremen
15:30 CEST	Baumann 16'; Maksymov 82'	Report	Zdrillic 60' van de Haar 75' (pen.)	Stadium: Weser-Stadion; Attendance: 32,106; Referee: Jörg Keßler

2 October 1999 7	SSV Ulm 1846	1–2	Hamburger SV	Ulm
15:30 CEST	Trkulja 74'	Report	Hoogma 86'; Yeboah 90'	Stadium: Donaustadion; Attendance: 22,800; Referee: Jürgen Aust

15 October 1999 8	Bayer 04 Leverkusen	4–1	SSV Ulm 1846	Leverkusen
20:00 CEST	Živković 12'; Kirsten 14', 18'; Ponte 67'	Report	Stadler 90'	Stadium: BayArena; Attendance: 22,500; Referee: Lutz Wagner

23 October 1999 9	SSV Ulm 1846	1–0	SpVgg Unterhaching	Ulm
15:30 CEST	Otto 36'	Report		Stadium: Donaustadion; Attendance: 20,000; Referee: Georg Dardenne

30 October 1999 10	MSV Duisburg	0–0	SSV Ulm 1846	Duisburg
15:30 CEST		Report		Stadium: Wedaustadion; Attendance: 13,400; Referee: Edgar Steinborn

6 November 1999 11	SSV Ulm 1846	0–1	Bayern Munich	Ulm
15:30 CET		Report	Jancker 44'	Stadium: Donaustadion; Attendance: 23,000; Referee: Markus Merk

20 November 1999 12	VfB Stuttgart	2–0	SSV Ulm 1846	Stuttgart
15:30 CET	Dundee 16'; Gerber 82'	Report		Stadium: Gottlieb-Daimler Stadion; Attendance: 42,000; Referee: Hellmut Krug

26 November 1999 13	SSV Ulm 1846	1–1	Schalke 04	Ulm
20:00 CET	Sand 45' (o.g.)	Report	Sand 76'	Stadium: Donaustadion; Attendance: 23,000; Referee: Franz-Xaver Wack

4 December 1999 14	Hertha BSC	3–0	SSV Ulm 1846	Berlin
15:30 CET	Wosz 2'; Sverrisson 66'; Preetz 74'	Report		Stadium: Olympiastadion; Attendance: 37,942; Referee: Winfried Buchhart

12 December 1999 15	SSV Ulm 1846	3–1	1. FC Kaiserslautern	Ulm
17:30 CET	Góra 3' van de Haar 19'; Bódog 22'	Report	Bódog 55' (o.g.)	Stadium: Donaustadion; Attendance: 23,000; Referee: Lutz Michael Fröhlich

15 December 1999 16	VfL Wolfsburg	1–2	SSV Ulm 1846	Wolfsburg
20:00 CET	Biliškov 62'	Report	van de Haar 38', 48'	Stadium: VfL-Stadion am Elsterweg; Attendance: 12,267; Referee: Peter Sippel

18 December 1999 17	SSV Ulm 1846	3–0	Eintracht Frankfurt	Ulm
15:30 CET	Leandro 9'; Scharinger 47'; Zdrilic 69'	Report		Stadium: Donaustadion; Attendance: 22,500; Referee: Hermann Albrecht

5 February 2000 18	SC Freiburg	2–0	SSV Ulm 1846	Freiburg im Breisgau
15:30 CET	Ben Slimane 23', 80'	Report		Stadium: Dreisamstadion; Attendance: 24,800; Referee: Markus Merk

8 February 2020 19	SSV Ulm 1846	3–0	1860 Munich	Ulm
20:00 CET	Otto 4' van de Haar 14'; Scharinger 72'	Report		Stadium: Donaustadion; Attendance: 22,793; Referee: Jürgen Jansen

12 February 2000 20	Borussia Dortmund	1–1	SSV Ulm 1846	Dortmund
15:30 CET	Herrlich 21'	Report	Bódog 60'	Stadium: Westfalenstadion; Attendance: 58,500; Referee: Edgar Steinborn

20 February 2000 21	SSV Ulm 1846	1–1	Hansa Rostock	Ulm
17:30 CET	van de Haar 83'	Report	Wibrån 37'	Stadium: Donaustadion; Attendance: 21,500; Referee: Wolfgang Stark

28 February 2000 22	Arminia Bielefeld	4–1	SSV Ulm 1846	Bielefeld
19:30 CET	Bode 14', 33'; Weissenberger 18', 86'	Report	Pleuler 6'	Stadium: Bielefelder Alm; Attendance: 13,041; Referee: Bernd Heynemann

5 March 2000 23	SSV Ulm 1846	2–1	Werder Bremen	Ulm
17:30 CET	van de Haar 15', 51'	Report	Aílton 68'	Stadium: Donaustadion; Attendance: 22,500; Referee: Lutz Wagner

11 March 2000 24	Hamburger SV	1–2	SSV Ulm 1846	Hamburg
15:30 CET	Gravesen 90'	Report	Scharinger 35'; Maier 65'	Stadium: Volksparkstadion; Attendance: 29,100; Referee: Florian Meyer

18 March 2000 25	SSV Ulm 1846	1–9	Bayer 04 Leverkusen	Ulm
15:30 CET	Leandro 90'	Report	Emerson 10', 39'; Rink 14'; Kirsten 19'; Neuville 68'; Zé Roberto 74', 81'; Ballack 75'; Schneider 85'	Stadium: Donaustadion; Attendance: 23,500; Referee: Hellmut Krug

24 March 2000 26	SpVgg Unterhaching	1–0	SSV Ulm 1846	Unterhaching, Munich
20:00 CET	Stadler 84' (o.g.)	Report		Stadium: Sportpark Unterhaching; Attendance: 10,000; Referee: Jürgen Jansen

31 March 2000 27	SSV Ulm 1846	0–3	MSV Duisburg	Ulm
20:00 CEST		Report	Beierle 33'; Hirsch 38'; Spies 76'	Stadium: Donaustadion; Attendance: 23,500; Referee: Jürgen Aust

8 April 2000 28	Bayern Munich	4–0	SSV Ulm 1846	Munich
15:30 CEST	Scholl 21'; Paulo Sérgio 24' (pen.); Jancker 62'; Wojciechowski 85'	Report		Stadium: Olympiastadion; Attendance: 63,000; Referee: Torsten Koop

11 April 2000 29	SSV Ulm 1846	1–1	VfB Stuttgart	Ulm
20:00 CEST	Leandro 71'	Report	Bordon 3'	Stadium: Donaustadion; Attendance: 23,000; Referee: Hellmut Krug

14 April 2000 30	Schalke 04	0–0	SSV Ulm 1846	Gelsenkirchen
20:00 CEST		Report		Stadium: Parkstadion; Attendance: 30,800; Referee: Jörg Kessler

22 April 2000 31	SSV Ulm 1846	0–1	Hertha BSC	Ulm
15:30 CEST		Report	Rehmer 51'	Stadium: Donaustadion; Attendance: 23,500; Referee: Florian Meyer

29 April 2000 32	1. FC Kaiserslautern	6–2	SSV Ulm 1846	Kaiserslautern
15:30 CEST	Tare 40', 58', 86'; Grauer 54' (o.g.); Pettersson 62', 82'	Report	Zdrilic 36', 70'	Stadium: Fritz-Walter-Stadion; Attendance: 41,500; Referee: Franz-Xaver Wack

13 May 2000 33	SSV Ulm 1846	2–0	VfL Wolfsburg	Ulm
15:30 CEST	Zdrilic 9' van de Haar 87'	Report		Stadium: Donaustadion; Attendance: 22,000; Referee: Jürgen Jansen

20 May 2000 34	Eintracht Frankfurt	2–1	SSV Ulm 1846	Frankfurt
15:30 CEST	Salou 24'; Heldt 89' (pen.)	Report	van de Haar 41'	Stadium: Waldstadion; Attendance: 58,245; Referee: Hellmut Krug

=== DFB-Pokal ===
8 August 1999 Second round	Fortuna Düsseldorf	0–2	SSV Ulm 1846	Düsseldorf
14:30 CEST		Report	Bódog 43'; Van de Haar 50'	Stadium: Rheinstadion; Attendance: 7,500; Referee: Bernd Hauer

12 October 1999 Third round	FC St. Pauli	0–2	SSV Ulm 1846	Hamburg
19:30 CEST		Report	Trkulja 42' (pen.); Van de Haar 48'	Stadium: Millerntor-Stadion; Attendance: 19,100; Referee: Bernhard Zerr

1 December 1999 Round of 16	Werder Bremen	2–1	SSV Ulm 1846	Bremen
19:30 CEST	Pizarro 21', 88'	Report	Leandro 33'	Stadium: Weserstadion; Attendance: 8,000; Referee: Bernd Heynemann
