= 2001–02 Borussia Dortmund season =

2001–02 season of Borussia Dortmund

Borussia Dortmund
2001–02 season
- Chairman: Gerd Niebaum
- Manager: Matthias Sammer
- Bundesliga: 1st
- DFB-Pokal: First round
- Champions League: Group stage
- UEFA Cup: Runners-up
- Top goalscorer: League: Márcio Amoroso (18 goals); All: Márcio Amoroso (26 goals)
Home colours	Away colours	Third colours

Borussia Dortmund clinched its 6th national championship, thanks to a stellar ending to the season, passing long-time leaders Bayer Leverkusen in the penultimate round, before sealing the title with a win on the final day. It also reached the final of the UEFA Cup, where it had the disadvantage of playing away from home against Feyenoord. With skipper Jürgen Kohler being sent off in his final match of the career, Feyenoord were able to win 3–2 and deprive Dortmund of its first international title since its famous UEFA Champions League victory in 1997.

Key players in Dortmund's success were Czech duo Jan Koller and Tomáš Rosický, top scorer Márcio Amoroso and German internationals such as Christoph Metzelder, goalkeeper Jens Lehmann and Christian Wörns. It was coach Matthias Sammer's first season in charge, and the 1996 European Player of the Year was an instant hit, becoming one of the very few coaches to win one of Europe's top domestic league at his first attempt.

== Squad ==
Note: Flags indicate national team as defined under FIFA eligibility rules; some limited exceptions apply. Players may hold more than one non-FIFA nationality.

No.	Pos.	Nation	Player
1	GK	GER	Jens Lehmann
2	DF	GER	Christian Wörns
3	DF	BRA	Evanílson (on loan from Parma)
4	MF	YUG	Miroslav Stević
5	DF	GER	Jürgen Kohler
6	DF	GER	Jörg Heinrich
7	DF	GER	Stefan Reuter
8	FW	CZE	Jan Koller
10	MF	CZE	Tomáš Rosický
11	FW	GER	Heiko Herrlich
12	FW	BRA	Ewerthon
13	FW	GER	Giuseppe Reina
14	DF	FRA	Guy Demel (Note: Demel was born in Orsay, France, but would acquire an Ivory Coast passport in 2004 and would make his international debut for Ivory Coast in 2004.)
15	MF	NGR	Sunday Oliseh
17	DF	BRA	Dedê
18	MF	GER	Lars Ricken
19	MF	GHA	Otto Addo (Note: Addo was born in Hamburg, West Germany (now Germany), but also qualified to represent Ghana internationally and made his international debut for Ghana in February 1999.)

No.	Pos.	Nation	Player
20	GK	GER	Philipp Laux
21	DF	GER	Christoph Metzelder
22	FW	BRA	Márcio Amoroso
23	DF	ALG	Ahmed Reda Madouni
25	MF	GER	Sebastian Kehl
27	MF	GER	David Odonkor
28	MF	GER	Francis Bugri
29	MF	NOR	Jan-Derek Sørensen
31	FW	GER	Emmanuel Krontiris
32	GK	GER	Alexander Kuschmann
33	MF	GER	Florian Kringe
34	GK	GER	Michael Ratajczak
38	DF	GER	Florian Thorwart
41	DF	GER	Timo Achenbach
42	MF	GER	Salvatore Gambino
43	MF	GER	Michael Kügler

=== Left club during season ===
Note: Flags indicate national team as defined under FIFA eligibility rules; some limited exceptions apply. Players may hold more than one non-FIFA nationality.

No.	Pos.	Nation	Player
9	FW	GER	Fredi Bobic (Note: Bobic was born in Maribor, Yugoslavia (now Slovenia), but also was raised in West Germany (now Germany) from a few months after birth and made his international debut for Germany in 1994.) (on loan to Bolton Wanderers)
16	MF	BIH	Sead Kapetanovic (released)

No.	Pos.	Nation	Player
40	FW	USA	Conor Casey (on loan to Hannover 96)

== Competitions ==
=== Bundesliga ===
==== League table ====
Pos	Team	Pld	W	D	L	GF	GA	GD	Pts	Qualification or relegation
1	Borussia Dortmund (C)	34	21	7	6	62	33	+29	70	Qualification to Champions League group stage
2	Bayer Leverkusen	34	21	6	7	77	38	+39	69	Qualification to Champions League group stage
3	Bayern Munich	34	20	8	6	65	25	+40	68	Qualification to Champions League third qualifying round
4	Hertha BSC	34	18	7	9	61	38	+23	61	Qualification to UEFA Cup first round
5	Schalke 04	34	18	7	9	52	36	+16	61	Qualification to UEFA Cup first round

Source: bundesliga.de
Rules for classification: 1) points; 2) goal difference; 3) number of goals scored.
(C) Champions

Jul 28, 2001 1	Borussia Dortmund	2–0	1. FC Nürnberg	Dortmund
15:30	Amoroso 12', 33'			Stadium: Westfalenstadion; Attendance: 65,000; Referee: Michael Weiner

Aug 4, 2001 2	Hertha BSC	0–2	Borussia Dortmund	Berlin
15:30			Amoroso 52'; Stevic 87'	Stadium: Olympiastadion; Attendance: 55,000; Referee: Helmut Fleischer

Aug 11, 2001 3	Borussia Dortmund	4–0	VfL Wolfsburg	Dortmund
15:30	Amoroso 29'; Ricken 33'; Koller 41'; Rosický 84'			Stadium: Westfalenstadion; Attendance: 66,000; Referee: Franz-Xaver Wack

Aug 18, 2001 4	Hansa Rostock	0–2	Borussia Dortmund	Rostock
15:30			Rosický 4'; Oliseh 13'	Stadium: Ostseestadion; Attendance: 25,000; Referee: Hermann Albrecht

Sep 8, 2001 5	Borussia Dortmund	0–2	Bayern Munich	Dortmund
15:30			Salihamidžić 22'; Santa Cruz 58'	Stadium: Westfalenstadion; Attendance: 68,600; Referee: Lutz-Michael Fröhlich

Sep 15, 2001 6	Schalke 04	1–0	Borussia Dortmund	Gelsenkirchen
15:30	Möller 17'			Stadium: Arena AufSchalke; Attendance: 60,204; Referee: Herbert Fandel

Sep 22, 2001 7	Borussia Dortmund	1–1	Bayer Leverkusen	Dortmund
15:30	Amoroso 7'		Berbatov 79'	Stadium: Westfalenstadion; Attendance: 64,500; Referee: Jürgen Jansen

Sep 29, 2001 8	FC St. Pauli	1–2	Borussia Dortmund	Hamburg
15:30	Meggle 77'		Ewerthon 12'; Koller 33'	Stadium: Stadion am Millerntor; Attendance: 20,700; Referee: Peter Sippel

Oct 13, 2001 9	Borussia Mönchengladbach	1–2	Borussia Dortmund	Mönchengladbach
15:30	Demo 78'		Ricken 13'; Ewerthon 23'	Stadium: Weserstadion; Attendance: 34,500; Referee: Jürgen Aust

Oct 21, 2001 10	Borussia Dortmund	0–2	SC Freiburg	Dortmund
17:30			Coulibaly 44'; Kehl 90+1'	Stadium: Westfalenstadion; Attendance: 66,500; Referee: Alfons Berg

Oct 27, 2001 11	Energie Cottbus	0–2	Borussia Dortmund	Cottbus
15:30			Ricken 78'; Amoroso 83'	Stadium: Stadion der Freundschaft; Attendance: 19,300; Referee: Uwe Kemmling

Nov 3, 2001 12	Borussia Dortmund	1–0	VfB Stuttgart	Dortmund
15:30	Ricken 51'			Stadium: Westfalenstadion; Attendance: 65,000; Referee: Wolfgang Stark

Nov 17, 2001 13	1860 Munich	1–3	Borussia Dortmund	Munich
15:30	Häßler 78'		Ewerthon 61'; Koller 70'; Amoroso 81' (pen.)	Stadium: Olympiastadion; Attendance: 28,000; Referee: Torsten Koop

Nov 25, 2001 14	Borussia Dortmund	3–0	Kaiserslautern	Dortmund
18:00	Ewerthon 77'; Amoroso 86', 90+1' (pen.)			Stadium: Westfalenstadion; Attendance: 65,500; Referee: Lutz Wagner

Dec 1, 2001 15	Köln	0–2	Borussia Dortmund	Cologne
15:30			Amoroso 17' (pen.); Ewerthon 42'	Stadium: Müngersdorfer Stadion; Attendance: 42,000; Referee: Herbert Fandel

Dec 8, 2001 16	Borussia Dortmund	1–0	Hamburger SV	Dortmund
15:30	Ricken 50'			Stadium: Westfalenstadion; Attendance: 65,000; Referee: Helmut Fleischer

Dec 15, 2001 17	Werder Bremen	1–1	Borussia Dortmund	Bremen
15:30	Frings 40'		Ewerthon 56'	Stadium: Weserstadion; Attendance: 35,000; Referee: Alfons Berg

Dec 18, 2001 18	Nürnberg	2–2	Borussia Dortmund	Nuremberg
20:00	Müller 52'; Nikl 66'		Ricken 73'; Stevic 76'	Stadium: Frankenstadion; Attendance: 25,000; Referee: Florian Meyer

Jan 27, 2002 19	Borussia Dortmund	3–1	Hertha BSC	Dortmund
17:30	Koller 7', 54'; Wörns 76'		Neuendorf 71'	Stadium: Westfalenstadion; Attendance: 63,000; Referee: Jürgen Aust

Feb 2, 2002 20	VfL Wolfsburg	1–1	Borussia Dortmund	Wolfsburg
15:30	Marić 37'		Heinrich 3'	Stadium: VfL-Stadion am Elsterweg; Attendance: 17,226; Referee: Markus Merk

Feb 6, 2002 21	Borussia Dortmund	2–0	Hansa Rostock	Dortmund
20:00	Ewerthon 66'; Amoroso 81'			Stadium: Westfalenstadion; Attendance: 60,500; Referee: Michael Weiner

Feb 9, 2002 22	Bayern Munich	1–1	Borussia Dortmund	Munich
15:30	Élber 83'		Amoroso 78'	Stadium: Olympiastadion; Attendance: 54,000; Referee: Edgar Steinborn

Feb 16, 2002 23	Borussia Dortmund	1–1	Schalke 04	Dortmund
15:30	Ewerthon 50'		Kamphuis 17'	Stadium: Westfalenstadion; Attendance: 68,600; Referee: Franz-Xaver Wack

Feb 24, 2002 24	Bayer Leverkusen	4–0	Borussia Dortmund	Leverkusen
17:30	Ballack 32'; Ramelow 50'; Neuville 64'; Berbatov 74'			Stadium: BayArena; Attendance: 22,500; Referee: Helmut Fleischer

Mar 3, 2002 25	Borussia Dortmund	1–1	FC St. Pauli	Dortmund
17:30	Amoroso 83' (pen.)		Patschinski 32'	Stadium: Westfalenstadion; Attendance: 61,500; Referee: Lutz-Michael Fröhlich

Mar 9, 2002 26	Borussia Dortmund	3–1	Borussia Mönchengladbach	Dortmund
15:30	Nielsen 10' (o.g.); Amoroso 63' (pen.); Koller 77'		Dedê (o.g.)	Stadium: Westfalenstadion; Attendance: 68,600; Referee: Peter Gagelmann

Mar 17, 2002 27	SC Freiburg	1–5	Borussia Dortmund	Freiburg im Breisgau
17:30	Kobiashvili 9'		Ewerthon 15'; Dedê 64'; Amoroso 66'; Koller 69', 70'	Stadium: Dreisamstadion; Attendance: 24,000; Referee: Herbert Fandel

Mar 24, 2002 28	Borussia Dortmund	3–0	Energie Cottbus	Dortmund
17:30	Ewerthon 28'; Rosický 35'; Reina 80'			Stadium: Westfalenstadion; Attendance: 65,500; Referee: Lutz Wagner

Mar 30, 2002 29	VfB Stuttgart	3–2	Borussia Dortmund	Stuttgart
15:30	Dundee 33'; Meißner 37'; Ganea 63'		Wörns 51'; Koller 78'	Stadium: Gottlieb-Daimler-Stadion; Attendance: 44,500; Referee: Markus Merk

Apr 7, 2002 30	Borussia Dortmund	2–1	1860 Munich	Dortmund
17:30	Kehl 20'; Heinrich 26'		Schroth 12'	Stadium: Westfalenstadion; Attendance: 66,000; Referee: Michael Weiner

Apr 14, 2002 31	Kaiserslautern	1–0	Borussia Dortmund	Kaiserslautern
17:30	Pettersson 48'			Stadium: Fritz-Walter-Stadion; Attendance: 40,600; Referee: Hermann Albrecht

Apr 20, 2002 32	Borussia Dortmund	2–1	Köln	Dortmund
15:30	Rosický 21'; Amoroso 89' (pen.)		Lottner 56'	Stadium: Westfalenstadion; Attendance: 68,600; Referee: Helmut Fleischer

Apr 27, 2002 33	Hamburger SV	3–4	Borussia Dortmund	Hamburg
15:30	Wicky 41' (pen.); Hoogma 80'; Meijer 90'		Amoroso 36', 62' (pen.); Rosický 38'; Koller 86'	Stadium: Volksparkstadion; Attendance: 55,340; Referee: Herbert Fandel

May 4, 2002 34	Borussia Dortmund	2–1	Werder Bremen	Dortmund
15:30	Koller 41'; Ewerthon 74'		Stalteri 17'	Stadium: Westfalenstadion; Attendance: 68,600; Referee: Edgar Steinborn

=== Champions League ===
==== Third qualifying round ====
7 August 2001	Shakhtar Donetsk (Ukraine)	0–2	(Germany) Borussia Dortmund	Shakhtar Stadium, Donetsk
19:30 CET		Report	Ricken 35'; Oliseh 73'	Attendance: 31,714; Referee: Knud Erik Fisker (Denmark)

22 August 2001	Borussia Dortmund (Germany)	3–1 (5–1 agg.)	(Ukraine) Shakhtar Donetsk	Westfalenstadion, Dortmund
20:30 CET	Koller 50', 68'; Amoroso 64'	Report	Aghahowa 7'	Attendance: 47,000; Referee: Karl-Erik Nilsson (Sweden)

==== Group stage ====
Pos	Team	Pld	W	D	L	GF	GA	GD	Pts	Qualification
1	(England) Liverpool	6	3	3	0	7	3	+4	12	Advance to second group stage
2	(Portugal) Boavista	6	2	2	2	8	7	+1	8	Advance to second group stage
3	(Germany) Borussia Dortmund	6	2	2	2	6	7	−1	8	Transfer to UEFA Cup
4	(Ukraine) Dynamo Kyiv	6	1	1	4	5	9	−4	4	

Source: RSSSF

11 September 2001	Dynamo Kyiv (Ukraine)	2–2	(Germany) Borussia Dortmund	Olimpiyskiy NSC, Kyiv
20:45	Melaschenko 15'; Idahor 45+1'	Report	Koller 56'; Amoroso 74'	Attendance: 67,000; Referee: Ľuboš Micheľ (Slovakia)

19 September 2001	Borussia Dortmund (Germany)	0–0	(England) Liverpool	Westfalenstadion, Dortmund
20:45		Report		Attendance: 46,000; Referee: Valentin Ivanov (Russia)

26 September 2001	Boavista (Portugal)	2–1	(Germany) Borussia Dortmund	Estádio do Bessa, Porto
20:45	Silva 23'; Sánchez 39'	Report	Amoroso 76'	Attendance: 7,600; Referee: Rune Pedersen (Norway)

16 October 2001	Borussia Dortmund (Germany)	2–1	(Portugal) Boavista	Westfalenstadion, Dortmund
20:45	Ricken 50'; Koller 68'	Report	Alex Goulart 33'	Attendance: 41,247; Referee: Stefano Braschi (Italy)

24 October 2001	Borussia Dortmund (Germany)	1–0	(Ukraine) Dynamo Kyiv	Westfalenstadion, Dortmund
20:45	Rosický 34'	Report		Attendance: 41,500; Referee: Kyros Vassaras (Greece)

30 October 2001	Liverpool (England)	2–0	(Germany) Borussia Dortmund	Anfield, Liverpool
20:45	Šmicer 15'; Wright 82'	Report		Attendance: 41,507; Referee: Kim Milton Nielsen (Denmark)

=== UEFA Cup ===
==== Third round ====
22 November 2001	Copenhagen (Denmark)	0–1	(Germany) Borussia Dortmund	Parken Stadium, Copenhagen
18:30		Report	Herrlich 90'	Referee: Mike Riley (England)

6 December 2001	Borussia Dortmund (Germany)	1–0 (2–0 agg.)	(Denmark) Copenhagen	Westfalenstadion, Dortmund
18:00	Sørensen 89'	Report		Referee: Mike McCurry (Scotland)

==== Fourth round ====
21 February 2002	Lille (France)	1–1	(Germany) Borussia Dortmund	Stade Grimonprez-Jooris, Lille
20:45	Bassir 72'	Report	Ewerthon 67'	Referee: Arturo Daudén Ibáñez (Spain)

28 February 2002	Borussia Dortmund (Germany)	0–0 (1a–1 agg.)	(France) Lille	Westfalenstadion, Dortmund
20:30		Report		Referee: Domenico Messina (Italy)

==== Quarter-finals ====
14 March 2002	Slovan Liberec (Czech Republic)	0–0	(Germany) Borussia Dortmund	Letná Stadion, Prague
20:25		Report		Attendance: 14,458; Referee: Vítor Melo Pereira (Portugal)

21 March 2002	Borussia Dortmund (Germany)	4–0 (4–0 agg.)	(Czech Republic) Slovan Liberec	Westfalenstadion, Dortmund
20:30	Amoroso 51'; Koller 57'; Ricken 70'; Ewerthon 89'	Report		Attendance: 36,500; Referee: Stefano Braschi (Italy)

==== Semi-finals ====
4 April 2002	Borussia Dortmund (Germany)	4–0	(Italy) Milan	Westfalenstadion, Dortmund
20:30	Amoroso 7' (pen.), 33', 39'; Heinrich 63'	Report		Attendance: 51,000; Referee: Graham Poll (England)

11 April 2002	Milan (Italy)	3–1 (3–5 agg.)	(Germany) Borussia Dortmund	San Siro, Milan
20:45	Inzaghi 10'; Contra 18'; Serginho 90+2' (pen.)	Report	Ricken 90+4'	Attendance: 15,301; Referee: Gilles Veissière (France)

==== Final ====
8 May 2002	Feyenoord (Netherlands)	3–2	(Germany) Borussia Dortmund	De Kuip, Rotterdam
20:45 CEST	Van Hooijdonk 33' (pen.), 40'; Tomasson 50'	Report	Amoroso 47' (pen.); Koller 58'	Attendance: 48,500; Referee: Vítor Melo Pereira (Portugal)
