= 1999–2000 Borussia Dortmund season =

1999–2000 season of Borussia Dortmund

Borussia Dortmund
1999–2000 season
- Head coach: Michael Skibbe (until 6 February); Bernd Krauss (from 6 February to 13 April); Udo Lattek (from 14 April)
- Stadium: Westfalenstadion
- Bundesliga: 11th
- DFB-Pokal: Third round
- Champions League: First group stage
- UEFA Cup: Fourth round
- Top goalscorer: League: Fredi Bobic (7); All: Fredi Bobic (12)
Home colours	Away colours

During the 1999–2000 season, Borussia Dortmund played in the Bundesliga, the highest tier of the German football league system.

== Season summary ==
Michael Skibbe was demoted from his role of head coach in early February after a run of only one win in the last 10 matches, returning to his previous role as coordinator of the youth team. Bernd Krauss came as his replacement, but only lasted 2 months before being sacked himself with Dortmund one point clear of relegation with five games left. Udo Lattek, who had managed Dortmund nearly two decades earlier, came in for the final five games and saved Dortmund with 8 points in those remaining games, with only one loss (to champions Bayern Munich). Ultimately, Dortmund finished 11th, five points clear of relegation. Lattek returned to retirement at the end of the season (he would never manage another team again) and was succeeded by former Dortmund defender Matthias Sammer.

== Players ==
=== First team squad ===
Squad at end of season

No.	Pos.	Nation	Player
1	GK	GER	Jens Lehmann
2	DF	GER	Christian Wörns
3	DF	BRA	Evanílson
4	MF	YUG	Miroslav Stević
5	DF	GER	Jürgen Kohler
7	DF	GER	Stefan Reuter
8	MF	GER	Christian Nerlinger
10	MF	GER	Andreas Möller
11	FW	GER	Heiko Herrlich
12	GK	GER	Wolfgang de Beer
13	FW	ITA	Giuseppe Reina
14	FW	BIH	Sergej Barbarez
15	DF	NED	Alfred Nijhuis
16	MF	BIH	Sead Kapetanović

No.	Pos.	Nation	Player
17	DF	BRA	Dedé
18	MF	GER	Lars Ricken
19	MF	GHA	Otto Addo (Note: Addo was born in Hamburg, West Germany, but also qualified to represent Ghana internationally and made his international debut for Ghana in February 1999.)
20	FW	GER	Fredi Bobic (Note: Bobic was born in Maribor, SFR Yugoslavia (now Slovenia), but was raised in West Germany from the age of 1 and made his international debut for Germany in October 1994.)
22	FW	GHA	Ibrahim Tanko
24	FW	NGR	Victor Ikpeba
25	FW	GHA	Bashiru Gambo
27	DF	AUT	Wolfgang Feiersinger
28	DF	GER	Benjamin Knoche
29	MF	RUS	Vladimir But
31	MF	GER	Francis Bugri
33	DF	GER	Karsten Baumann
34	DF	TUR	Kurtulus Öztürk (Note: Öztürk was born in Werne, West Germany, but also qualified to represent Turkey internationally and represented Turkey at U-17 and U-18 level.)

== Competitions ==
=== Bundesliga ===
==== League table ====
Pos	Team	Pld	W	D	L	GF	GA	GD	Pts	Qualification or relegation
9	Werder Bremen	34	13	8	13	65	52	+13	47	Qualification to UEFA Cup first round (Note: As domestic cup winners FC Bayern Munich had qualified for UEFA Champions League, the UEFA Cup place belonging to the domestic cup winners was transferred to Werder Bremen.)
10	SpVgg Unterhaching	34	12	8	14	40	42	−2	44	
11	Borussia Dortmund	34	9	13	12	41	38	+3	40	
12	SC Freiburg	34	10	10	14	45	50	−5	40	
13	Schalke 04	34	8	15	11	42	44	−2	39 (Note: Head-to-head was used as a tie-breaker between Schalke 04 and Frankfurt.)	

Source: www.dfb.de
Rules for classification: 1) points; 2) goal difference; 3) number of goals scored.
