= 2000–01 Borussia Dortmund season =

2000–01 season of Borussia Dortmund

Borussia Dortmund
2000–01 season
- Chairman: Gerd Niebaum
- Manager: Matthias Sammer
- Stadium: Westfalenstadion
- Bundesliga: 3rd
- DFB-Pokal: Third round
- Top goalscorer: League: Fredi Bobic (10); All: Heiko Herrlich (11)
Home colours	Away colours

The 2000–01 season Borussia Dortmund began on 11 August 2000 with a Fußball-Bundesliga match against Hansa Rostock, and ended on 19 May 2001, last matchday of the Bundesliga, with a match against 1. FC Köln. In that season Borussia Dortmund became the first—and so far the only—publicly traded club on the German stock market.

== Transfers ==
=== Summer transfers ===
In:

No.	Pos.	Nation	Player
6	MF	GER	Jörg Heinrich (from ACF Fiorentina)
15	MF	NGR	Sunday Oliseh (from Juventus FC)
20	GK	GER	Philipp Laux (from SSV Ulm 1846)
21	DF	GER	Christoph Metzelder (from FC Schalke 04)

Out:

No.	Pos.	Nation	Player
10	MF	GER	Andreas Möller (to FC Schalke 04)
14	FW	BIH	Sergej Barbarez (to Hamburger SV)
27	DF	GER	Wolfgang Feiersinger (to LASK Linz)
33	DF	GER	Karsten Baumann (to Rot-Weiß Oberhausen)
--	FW	USA	Jovan Kirovski (to Sporting Lisbon)

=== Winter transfers ===
In:

No.	Pos.	Nation	Player
10	MF	CZE	Tomáš Rosický (from AC Sparta Prague)
29	FW	NOR	Jan-Derek Sørensen (from FK Lyn)
31	FW	GER	Emmanuel Krontiris (from Tennis Borussia Berlin)
40	FW	USA	Conor Casey (from University of Portland)

Out:

No.	Pos.	Nation	Player
22	FW	GHA	Ibrahim Tanko (to SC Freiburg)
29	MF	RUS	Vladimir But (to SC Freiburg)

== Statistics ==
=== Goals and appearances ===
No.	Pos	Nat	Player	Total		Bundesliga		DFB-Pokal	
No.	Pos	Nat	Player	Apps	Goals	Apps	Goals	Apps	Goals
1	GK	(Germany) GER	Jens Lehmann	34	0	31	0	3	0
2	DF	(Germany) GER	Christian Wörns	26	3	23	3	3	0
3	MF	(Brazil) BRA	Evanílson	31	3	28	3	3	0
4	MF	(Federal Republic of Yugoslavia) YUG	Miroslav Stević	26	5	23	5	3	0
5	DF	(Germany) GER	Jürgen Kohler	30	0	28	0	2	0
6	MF	(Germany) GER	Jörg Heinrich	33	4	30	4	3	0
7	DF	(Germany) GER	Stefan Reuter	5	0	5	0	0	0
8	MF	(Germany) GER	Christian Nerlinger	21	1	20	1	1	0
9	FW	(Germany) GER	Fredi Bobic	25	10	24	10	1	0
10	MF	(Czech Republic) CZE	Tomáš Rosický	15	0	15	0	0	0
11	FW	(Germany) GER	Heiko Herrlich	12	11	10	8	2	3
12	GK	(Germany) GER	Wolfgang de Beer	0	0	0	0	0	0
13	FW	(Germany) GER	Giuseppe Reina	33	10	31	8	2	2
15	MF	(Nigeria) NGR	Sunday Oliseh	24	0	22	0	2	0
15	DF	(Netherlands) NED	Alfred Nijhuis	14	0	14	0	0	0
16	MF	(Bosnia and Herzegovina) BIH	Sead Kapetanović	5	0	5	0	0	0
17	MF	(Brazil) BRA	Dedê	34	3	31	3	3	0
18	MF	(Germany) GER	Lars Ricken	32	7	29	6	3	1
19	MF	(Ghana) GHA	Otto Addo	35	9	32	9	3	0
20	GK	(Germany) GER	Philipp Laux	3	0	3	0	0	0
21	DF	(Germany) GER	Christoph Metzelder	21	0	19	0	2	0
22	FW	(Ghana) GHA	Ibrahim Tanko	12	0	9	0	3	0
24	FW	(Nigeria) NGR	Victor Ikpeba	10	1	9	1	1	0
26	GK	(Germany) GER	Matthias Kleinsteiber	0	0	0	0	0	0
31	MF	(Germany) GER	Francis Bugri	0	0	0	0	0	0
31	FW	(Germany) GER	Emmanuel Krontiris	4	0	3	0	1	0
34	GK	(Germany) GER	Michael Ratajczak	0	0	0	0	0	0
40	FW	(United States) USA	Conor Casey	0	0	0	0	0	0

== Results ==
=== Bundesliga ===
Win Draw Loss

Note: Results are given with Borussia Dortmund score listed first.

Game	Date	Venue	Opponent	Result F–A	Attendance	Borussia Dortmund Goalscorers
1	11 August 2000	H	Hansa Rostock	1–0	61,000	Herrlich 61'
2	18 August 2000	A	Energie Cottbus	4–1	19,500	Evanílson 9', Stević 59', Herrlich 64', 81'
3	6 September 2000	H	TSV 1860 München	2–3	59,000	Ikpeba 37', Herrlich 54'
4	9 September 2000	A	SV Werder Bremen	2–1	31,800	Wörns 41', Addo 83'
5	16 September 2000	A	Hamburger SV	3–2	46,694	Addo 30', Herrlich 76', 81'
6	23 September 2000	H	FC Schalke 04	0–4	68,600
7	29 September 2000	A	Eintracht Frankfurt	1–1	38,600	Bobic 71'
8	13 October 2000	H	SC Freiburg	1–0	62,000	Heinrich 83'
9	21 October 2000	A	Bayer Leverkusen	0–2	22,500
10	28 October 2000	H	1. FC Kaiserslautern	1–2	62,000	Evanílson 63'
11	4 November 2000	A	Bayern Munich	2–6	62,000	Herrlich 2', Addo 72'
12	10 November 2000	H	Hertha BSC	2–0	61,000	Ricken 3', Reina 72'
13	19 November 2000	A	VfL Bochum	1–1	33,000	Heinrich 87'
14	25 November 2000	H	VfL Wolfsburg	2–1	60,500	Reina 32', Evanílson 32'
15	2 December 2000	A	VfB Stuttgart	2–0	30,000	Dedê 5', Stević 64'
16	9 December 2000	H	SpVgg Unterhaching	3–0	60,500	Stević 16', Bobic 30', Reina 40'
17	13 December 2000	A	1. FC Köln	0–0	41,000
18	16 December 2000	A	Hansa Rostock	2–1	14,000	Reina 8', Addo 48'
19	27 January 2001	H	Energie Cottbus	2–0	61,500	Nerlinger 64', Bobic 65'
20	2 February 2001	A	TSV 1860 München	0–1	20,000
21	11 February 2001	H	SV Werder Bremen	0–0	62,000
22	17 February 2001	H	Hamburger SV	4–2	64,500	Bobic 6', 59', Addo 54', Fukal 82' (o.g.)
23	24 February 2001	A	FC Schalke 04	0–0	62,109
24	2 March 2001	H	Eintracht Frankfurt	6–2	62,000	Wörns 30', Ricken 64', 67', Bobic 71', 90', Addo 79'
25	10 March 2001	A	SC Freiburg	2–2	25,000	Dedê 19', Reina 44'
26	17 March 2001	H	Bayer Leverkusen	1–3	68,600	Wörns 15'
27	1 April 2001	A	1. FC Kaiserslautern	4–1	41,500	Bobic 33', Addo 46', Ricken 62', Heinrich 76'
28	7 April 2001	H	Bayern Munich	1–1	68,600	Bobic 52'
29	14 April 2001	A	Hertha BSC	0–1	54,429
30	20 April 2001	H	VfL Bochum	5–0	65,500	Ricken 18', Heinrich 29', Reina 66', 68', Stević 89'
31	27 April 2001	A	VfL Wolfsburg	1–1	20,400	Heinrich 22'
32	4 May 2001	H	VfB Stuttgart	0–0	67,500
33	12 May 2001	A	SpVgg Unterhaching	4–1	15,300	Addo 5', 59', Ricken 74', Dedê 90'
34	19 May 2001	H	1. FC Köln	3–3	68,600	Stević 21', Reina 49', Bobic 89'

==== League table ====
Pos	Team	Pld	W	D	L	GF	GA	GD	Pts	Qualification or relegation
1	Bayern Munich (C)	34	19	6	9	62	37	+25	63	Qualification to Champions League group stage
2	Schalke 04	34	18	8	8	65	35	+30	62	Qualification to Champions League group stage
3	Borussia Dortmund	34	16	10	8	62	42	+20	58	Qualification to Champions League third qualifying round
4	Bayer Leverkusen	34	17	6	11	54	40	+14	57	Qualification to Champions League third qualifying round
5	Hertha BSC	34	18	2	14	58	52	+6	56	Qualification to UEFA Cup first round

Source: www.dfb.de
Rules for classification: 1) points; 2) goal difference; 3) number of goals scored.
(C) Champions

=== DFB-Pokal ===
Win Draw Loss

Note: Results are given with Borussia Dortmund score listed first.

Game	Date	Venue	Opponent	Result F–A	Attendance	Borussia Dortmund Goalscorers
1	26 August 2000	A	FC Ismaning	4–0	7,000	Ricken 13', Reina 53', Herrlich 66', 87'
2	31 October 2000	A	SV Wehen	1–0 a.e.t.	12,000	Herrlich 92'
3	29 November 2000	A	FC Schalke 04	1–2	58,419	Reina 3'

== See also ==
- 2000–01 Fußball-Bundesliga
- 2000–01 DFB-Pokal
- Borussia Dortmund
