= Philipp Laux =

German footballer (born 1973)

Personal information
- Date of birth: 25 January 1973 (age 53)
- Place of birth: Rastatt, West Germany
- Height: 1.82 m (6 ft 0 in)
- Position: Goalkeeper

Team information
- Current team: Borussia Dortmund (Sports Psychologist)

Youth career
- SV Niederbühl
- FC Rastatt 04
- VfB Gaggenau

Senior career*
| Years | Team | Apps | (Gls) |
| 1993–1994 | Borussia Dortmund | 0 | (0) |
| 1994–2000 | SSV Ulm 1846 | 202 | (0) |
| 2000–2002 | Borussia Dortmund | 8 | (0) |
| 2002–2003 | Eintracht Braunschweig | 8 | (0) |
| Total | | 218 | (0) |
- * Club domestic league appearances and goals

Philipp Laux (born 25 January 1973) is a German former footballer, now a sports psychologist for Borussia Dortmund.

== Playing career ==
Laux, who played as a goalkeeper, began his senior career in 1993 with Borussia Dortmund. After one year with their reserve team, he moved to SSV Ulm, then playing in the Regionalliga (level 3). In 1998, the club was promoted to the 2. Bundesliga, followed by an immediate promotion to the Bundesliga, the top tier of German football. They were relegated after one season, but Laux was a key player—he was the only member of the Ulm squad to play in all 34 matches that season—and managed to remain in the Bundesliga by rejoining Dortmund at the end of the year. He spent two years back at the Westfalenstadion, serving as a reserve goalkeeper as the club won the German title and reached the UEFA Cup final. He left for Eintracht Braunschweig in 2002, but due to cartilage damage in his left knee, Laux was forced to end his career.

== Coaching career ==
After retiring, Laux enrolled at the University of Mannheim to study psychology. He graduated in 2008.

During this time, he also worked as a goalkeeper coach. He served the German Football Association from 2004 to 2006, coaching the women's team and the youth team. From 2006 to 2008, he held a similar role at TSG 1899 Hoffenheim before joining Bayern Munich as part of Jürgen Klinsmann's new regime, taking on the role of sports psychologist. In 2012, he moved to RB Leipzig.

== Career statistics ==
Appearances and goals by club, season and competition
| Club | Season | League | | | National cup | | Europe | | Other | | Total | |
| Club | Season | Division | Apps | Goals | Apps | Goals | Apps | Goals | Apps | Goals | Apps | Goals |
|---|---|---|---|---|---|---|---|---|---|---|---|---|
| Borussia Dortmund | 1993–94 | Bundesliga | 0 | 0 | 0 | 0 | 0 | 0 | — | | 0 | 0 |
| SSV Ulm 1846 | 1994–95 | Regionalliga Süd | 33 | 0 | 2 | 0 | — | | — | | 35 | 0 |
| SSV Ulm 1846 | 1995–96 | Regionalliga Süd | 34 | 0 | 1 | 0 | — | | — | | 35 | 0 |
| SSV Ulm 1846 | 1996–97 | Regionalliga Süd | 34 | 0 | 1 | 0 | — | | — | | 35 | 0 |
| SSV Ulm 1846 | 1997–98 | Regionalliga Süd | 33 | 0 | 3 | 0 | — | | — | | 36 | 0 |
| SSV Ulm 1846 | 1998–99 | 2. Bundesliga | 34 | 0 | 1 | 0 | — | | — | | 35 | 0 |
| SSV Ulm 1846 | 1999–2000 | Bundesliga | 34 | 0 | 3 | 0 | — | | — | | 37 | 0 |
| SSV Ulm 1846 | Total | | 202 | 0 | 11 | 0 | — | | — | | 213 | 0 |
| Borussia Dortmund | 2000–01 | Bundesliga | 3 | 0 | 0 | 0 | — | | — | | 3 | 0 |
| Borussia Dortmund | 2001–02 | Bundesliga | 5 | 0 | 1 | 0 | 0 | 0 | 0 | 0 | 6 | 0 |
| Borussia Dortmund | 2002–03 | Bundesliga | — | | — | | — | | 0 | 0 | 0 | 0 |
| Borussia Dortmund | Total | | 8 | 0 | 1 | 0 | 0 | 0 | 0 | 0 | 9 | 0 |
| Eintracht Braunschweig | 2002–03 | 2. Bundesliga | 8 | 0 | 1 | 0 | — | | — | | 9 | 0 |
| Career total | | | 218 | 0 | 13 | 0 | 0 | 0 | 0 | 0 | 231 | 0 |

== Honours ==
- Bundesliga: 2002
