= Evanilson =

Evanilson may refer to:

- Evanílson (footballer, born 1975), Brazilian former footballer Evanílson Aparecido Ferreira
- Evanilson (footballer, born 1999), Brazilian footballer Francisco Evanilson de Lima Barbosa
