= Beer Money (disambiguation) =

Beer money is the nickname for an allowance given to soldiers in the British Army.

Beer Money may also refer to:

- Beer Money, a song by country artist Kip Moore
- Beer Money!, a sports game show set in New York
- Beer Money, Inc., a professional wrestling tag team
- Beer Money, an expansion and sequel to the game Lunch Money
- Beer Money, a 2001 comedy science-fiction film.

== See also ==
- Beer monopolies
