= Leandro Fonseca =

Leandro Fonseca may refer to:

- Leandro da Fonseca Euzebio, or simply Leandro (born 1981), Brazilian central defender who currently plays for Omiya Ardija on loan from Cruzeiro
- Leandro Fonseca (born 1975), Brazilian football player who currently plays for Yverdon
