= Alfred Nijhuis =

Dutch footballer

Personal information
- Date of birth: 23 March 1966 (age 60)
- Place of birth: Utrecht, Netherlands
- Height: 1.88 m (6 ft 2 in)
- Position: Defender

Senior career*
Years	Team	Apps	(Gls)
1984–1987	Enschede		
1987–1991	ASC Schöppingen		
1991–1997	MSV Duisburg	180	(17)
1997–1998	Urawa Reds	27	(6)
1998–2001	Borussia Dortmund	61	(6)

Managerial career
- 2012–2014: SuS Stadtlohn
- * Club domestic league appearances and goals

Alfred Nijhuis (Dutch pronunciation: [ˈɑlfrɛt ˈnɛiɦœys], born 23 March 1966) is a Dutch former professional footballer who played as defender.

== Career statistics ==
Appearances and goals by club, season and competition
Club	Season	League			National cup		League cup		Continental		Total	
Club	Season	Division	Apps	Goals	Apps	Goals	Apps	Goals	Apps	Goals	Apps	Goals
MSV Duisburg	1991–92	Bundesliga	33	5	1	0	–		–		33	5
MSV Duisburg	1992–93	2. Bundesliga	43	4	3	1	–		–		43	4
MSV Duisburg	1993–94	Bundesliga	28	0	3	2	–		–		28	0
MSV Duisburg	1994–95	Bundesliga	28	2	0	0	–		–		28	2
MSV Duisburg	1995–96	2. Bundesliga	16	2	1	0	–		–		16	2
MSV Duisburg	1996–97	Bundesliga	32	4	2	0	–		–		32	4
MSV Duisburg	Total		180	17	10	3	0	0	0	0	190	20
Urawa Reds	1997	J1 League	16	4	2	0	2	0	–		20	4
Urawa Reds	1998	J1 League	11	2	0	0	4	1	–		15	3
Urawa Reds	Total		27	6	2	0	6	1	0	0	35	7
Borussia Dortmund	1998–99	Bundesliga	27	4	3	0	–		–		30	4
Borussia Dortmund	1999–2000	Bundesliga	20	2	1	0	2	0	8	0	31	2
Borussia Dortmund	2000–01	Bundesliga	14	0	0	0	–		–		14	0
Borussia Dortmund	Total		61	6	4	1	2	0	8	0	75	7
Total			268	29	16	4	8	1	8	0	300	34
