= Marco Konrad =

German footballer

Personal information
- Date of birth: 18 October 1974 (age 52)
- Place of birth: Höchstädt an der Donau, West Germany
- Height: 1.81 m (5 ft 11 1/2 in)
- Position: Defender

Youth career
- –1993: TSV Bissingen
- 1993–1996: TSV 1861 Nördlingen

Senior career*
Years	Team	Apps	(Gls)
1996–1997	FC Gundelfingen		
1997–2001	SSV Ulm 1846	38	(0)
2001–2010	SC Pfullendorf	219	(10)

Managerial career
- 2010–2013: FV Ravensburg
- 2016–2019: SC Pfullendorf
- 2020–2022: FV Illertissen
- 2023–2025: SpVgg Fürth (assistant coach)
- 2026–: SC Freiburg (women)
- * Club domestic league appearances and goals

Marco Konrad (born 18 October 1974) is a German football manager and former footballer. He previously played in the Bundesliga with SSV Ulm 1846.

== Playing career ==
=== Early career ===
Born in Höchstädt an der Donau, Konrad started his career at the academy of TSV Bissingen before joining TSV 1861 Nördlingen in 1993. He joined FC Gundelfingen in 1996.

=== SSV Ulm ===
In 1997, Konrad joined then Regionalliga Süd side SSV Ulm 1846. Two consecutive promotions, however, saw Ulm compete in the Bundesliga for the first in their history in the 1999–2000 season. Konrad made 4 Bundesliga appearances in a season where a 16th-place finish would see them immediately relegated back to the 2. Bundesliga.

=== SC Pfullendorf ===
In the summer of 2001, Konrad joined Regionalliga Süd side SC Pfullendorf. Over the course of nine years, he would make over 200 appearances for the club.

== Coaching career ==
Konrad became manager of FV Ravensburg in the summer of 2010. He left Ravensburg at the end of the 2012–13 season. After a spell as assistant manager at SC Pfullendorf, Konrad was appointed as manager in August 2016. He became manager of FV Illertissen in March 2020.

== Personal life ==
Konrad is also a sports teacher.
