= Ünal Demirkıran =

German-Turkish footballer

Personal information
- Full name: Ünal Demirkıran
- Date of birth: 24 June 1979 (age 47)
- Place of birth: Neu-Ulm, West Germany
- Height: 1.72 m (5 ft 8 in)
- Position: Midfielder

Team information
- Current team: TSV Neu-Ulm (player-manager)
- Number: 5

Youth career
- 1990–1998: SSV Ulm

Senior career*
Years	Team	Apps	(Gls)
1998–2001	SSV Ulm Amateure		
1999–2003	SSV Ulm	35	(13)
2003–2005	VfR Aalen	81	(18)
2006	Sivasspor	3	(0)
2006–2007	SSV Reutlingen	27	(1)
2007–2010	1. FC Heidenheim	52	(6)
2010–2011	1. FC Heidenheim II		
2011–2013	FV Illertissen	45	(0)
2012	FV Illertissen II	2	(0)
2013–2014	TSG Thannhausen	20	(0)
2016–	TSV Neu-Ulm	34	(1)

Managerial career
- 2015–: TSV Neu-Ulm
- * Club domestic league appearances and goals

Ünal Demirkıran (born 24 June 1979) is a German-Turkish footballer who plays as a midfielder for TSV Neu-Ulm, where he is also the manager.

== Career ==
Demirkıran made his Bundesliga debut for SSV Ulm on 25 September 1999, coming on as a substitute in the 87th minute for Oliver Unsöld in the 2–2 away draw against Werder Bremen.
