= Heiko Herrlich =

German football player and manager (born 1971)

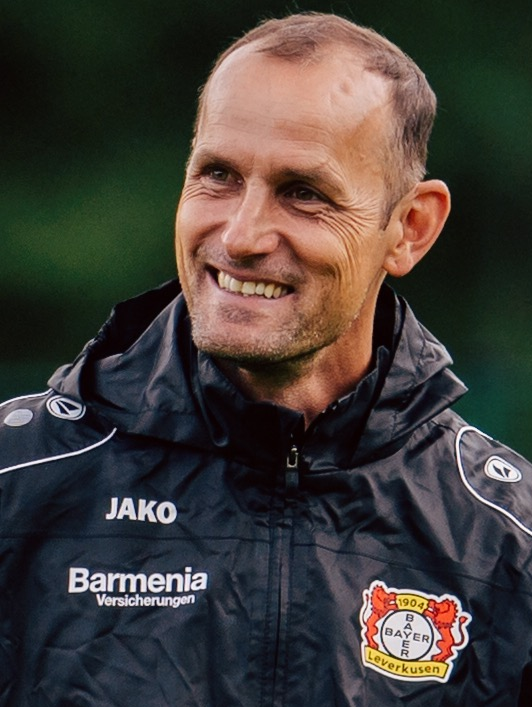
- Herrlich managing Bayer Leverkusen in 2017

Personal information
- Date of birth: 3 December 1971 (age 54)
- Place of birth: Mannheim, West Germany
- Height: 1.89 m (6 ft 2 in)
- Position: Striker

Youth career
- 1978–1984: FC Kollnau
- 1984–1986: FC Emmendingen
- 1986–1989: SC Freiburg

Senior career*
Years	Team	Apps	(Gls)
1989–1993	Bayer Leverkusen	75	(6)
1993–1995	Borussia Mönchengladbach	55	(28)
1995–2004	Borussia Dortmund	128	(41)
Total		258	(75)

International career
1990–1993	Germany U-21	20	(17)
1995	Germany	5	(1)

Managerial career
- 2007–2008: Germany U-17
- 2008–2009: Germany U-19
- 2009–2010: VfL Bochum
- 2011–2012: SpVgg Unterhaching
- 2015–2017: Jahn Regensburg
- 2017–2018: Bayer Leverkusen
- 2020–2021: FC Augsburg
- 2025: SpVgg Unterhaching
Medal record
Men's football
Representing Germany (as manager)
FIFA U-17 World Cup
Bronze medal – third place	2007
- * Club domestic league appearances and goals

Heiko Herrlich (born 3 December 1971) is a German football manager and former player who played as a striker.

== Club career ==
Herrlich played 258 matches (1989–2004) in the Bundesliga and scored 75 goals for Bayer 04 Leverkusen, Borussia Mönchengladbach and Borussia Dortmund. With Borussia Dortmund he won the German championship in 1996 and 2002, the Champions League and the Intercontinental Cup in 1997. With Borussia Mönchengladbach he won the DFB-Pokal in 1995, which he had also won in 1993 with Bayer Leverkusen.

In autumn 2000, it was discovered that he had a malignant brain tumor. He was successfully treated with radiation therapy and returned to Bundesliga action 2001 but was not able to return to his former glory as a player. He ended his professional career in 2004 after several injuries.

== International career ==
In 1995, Herrlich played five matches for the Germany national team, all in qualifying matches for UEFA Euro 1996. He scored once, against Wales, but missed the final tournament, which Germany won, due to injury.

== Coaching career ==
Herrlich received his coaching license in 2005 and began coaching the youth team of Borussia Dortmund. He also became the German spokesman for the 2006 INAS World Football Championships.

In July 2007, he was appointed as coach of the Germany U-17 team and won third place at the 2007 FIFA Under-17 World Cup in South Korea. On 27 October 2009, he was released from the German Football Association. He became later the head coach of VfL Bochum between 27 October 2009 and 29 April 2010. He finished with a record of four wins, eight draws, and 10 losses.

At the beginning of the 2011–12 season, he was named new manager of SpVgg Unterhaching. He left the club on 25 May 2012 for personal reasons. He finished with a record of 13 wins, eight draws, and 19 losses.

On 21 June 2013, he became the manager for the Bayern Munich U-17 team. In June 2015, Bayern Munich restructured their youth department and Herrlich left Munich.

On 20 December 2015, he took over Jahn Regensburg. His contract was scheduled to run up to the end of the 2015–16 season, with an extension for another year if the Jahn achieved promotion to the 3. Liga. The Ratisbon based club achieved back to back promotions under Herrlich's reign, returning to 2.Liga at the end of the 2016–17 season.

On 9 June 2017, it was announced that Herrlich will return to Leverkusen as new head coach.

On 23 December 2018, Bayer Leverkusen announced they would be parting ways with Herrlich, citing bad tactics and poor overall performance.

He was appointed as the new head coach of FC Augsburg on 10 March 2020. On 26 April 2021, he was sacked.

In January 2025, he moved to SpVgg Unterhaching but was sacked just three months later.

== Career statistics ==
=== Club ===
Appearances and goals by club, season and competition
Club	Season	League			German Cup		Europe (Note: Appearances in UEFA Champions League and Europa League)		Other (Note: Appearances in German League Cup and Intercontinental Cup)		Total	
Club	Season	League	Apps	Goals	Apps	Goals	Apps	Goals	Apps	Goals	Apps	Goals
Bayer Leverkusen	1989–90	Bundesliga	16	0	1	0	—		—		17	0
Bayer Leverkusen	1990–91	Bundesliga	18	3	1	0	3	1	—		22	4
Bayer Leverkusen	1991–92	Bundesliga	28	3	5	2	—		—		33	5
Bayer Leverkusen	1992–93	Bundesliga	13	0	0	0	—		—		13	0
Bayer Leverkusen	Total		75	6	7	2	3	1	0	0	85	9
Borussia Mönchengladbach	1993–94	Bundesliga	23	8	2	0	—		—		25	8
Borussia Mönchengladbach	1994–95	Bundesliga	32	20	6	6	—		—		38	26
Borussia Mönchengladbach	Total		55	28	8	6	0	0	0	0	63	34
Borussia Dortmund	1995–96	Bundesliga	16	7	4	1	6	1	—		26	9
Borussia Dortmund	1996–97	Bundesliga	23	8	1	1	9	3	—		33	12
Borussia Dortmund	1997–98	Bundesliga	21	7	3	2	7	2	3	1	34	12
Borussia Dortmund	1998–99	Bundesliga	21	6	2	0	—		—		23	6
Borussia Dortmund	1999–2000	Bundesliga	22	6	1	0	9	1	1	0	33	7
Borussia Dortmund	2000–01	Bundesliga	10	7	2	3	—		—		12	10
Borussia Dortmund	2001–02	Bundesliga	10	0	0	0	3	1	—		13	1
Borussia Dortmund	2002–03	Bundesliga	5	0	2	0	2	0	—		9	0
Borussia Dortmund	Total		128	41	15	7	36	4	4	1	183	53
Career total			258	75	30	15	39	5	4	1	331	96

=== International ===
Score and result list Germany's goal tally first, score column indicates score after Herrlich goal.

International goal scored by Heiko Herrlich
No.	Date	Venue	Opponent	Score	Result	Competition
1	26 April 1995	Rheinstadion, Düsseldorf, Germany	Wales	1–1	1–1	UEFA Euro 1996 qualifying

=== Managerial ===
As of match played 21 March 2025

Team	From	To	Record					Ref.
Team	From	To	G	W	D	L	Win %	Ref.
Bochum	27 October 2009	29 April 2010	22	4	8	10	18.18	
Unterhaching	1 July 2011	25 May 2012	40	13	8	19	32.50	
Jahn Regensburg	20 December 2015	30 June 2017	59	28	13	18	47.46	
Bayer Leverkusen	1 July 2017	23 December 2018	64	32	14	18	50.00	
FC Augsburg	10 March 2020	26 April 2021	42	12	9	21	28.57	
SpVgg Unterhaching	3 January 2025	21 March 2025	9	1	2	6	11.11	
Total			235	89	54	92	37.87	—

== Honours ==
=== As a player ===
Bayer Leverkusen

- DFB-Pokal: 1992–93

Borussia Mönchengladbach

- DFB-Pokal: 1994–95

Borussia Dortmund

- Bundesliga: 1995–96, 2001–02
- UEFA Champions League: 1996–97
- Intercontinental Cup: 1997
- UEFA Cup runner-up: 2001–02
- UEFA Super Cup runner-up: 1997

Individual

- Bundesliga Top Scorer: 1994–95 (joint with Mario Basler)

=== As a coach ===
Germany U17

- FIFA Under-17 World Cup third place: 2007

Individual

- Best Under 17 Coach: 2008
