= Markus Pleuler =

German footballer (born 1970)

Personal information
- Date of birth: 10 May 1970 (age 56)
- Place of birth: Bad Urach, West Germany
- Height: 1.78 m (5 ft 10 in)
- Position: Midfielder

Senior career*
Years	Team	Apps	(Gls)
1988–1994	SSV Reutlingen	94	(10)
1994–2000	Ulm 1846	158	(16)
2000–2002	Stuttgarter Kickers	37	(4)
2003	UTA Arad		
2003–2004	Darmstadt 98	28	(1)
2004–2005	Ulm 1846	16	(2)
2005–2007	SpVgg Au/Iller	30	(10)
Total		363	(43)

Managerial career
- 2005–2009: SpVgg Au/Iller
- 2009–2010: TSG Thannhausen
- 2012–2015: FC Albstadt 07
- 2016–2018: FC Sportfreunde Heppenheim
- * Club domestic league appearances and goals

Markus Pleuler (born 10 May 1970) is a German football manager and former player who played as a midfielder. He played in the Bundesliga for SSV Ulm 1846.

== Club career ==
=== Early career ===
Born in Bad Urach, Pleuler grew up in Hülben, playing youth football for SV Hülben and TSV Urach, before joining SSV Reutlingen's academy as a 13 year old in 1983. Having joined their first team in 1988, Pleuler made 94 appearances for Reutlingen between 1990 and 1994, scoring 10 goals.

=== SSV Ulm 1846 ===
In 1994, Pleuler joined Regionalliga Süd side SSV Ulm 1846. Pleuler played regularly at the club and in 1998, the club was promoted to the second tier of German football, the 2. Bundesliga. Pleuler scored two goals in 23 games as the club was promoted to the Bundesliga at the end of the season. Over the course of the 1999–2000 season, Pleuler played 19 times, scoring once, in a season that would see Ulm relegated back to the 2. Bundesliga following a 16th-placed finish.

=== Later career ===
Pleuler left Ulm in 2000, and went on to play for Stuttgarter Kickers, UTA Arad and Darmstadt 98 before returning to Ulm in 2004. Pleuler joined SpVgg Au/Iller as a player-manager in 2005 before retiring in 2007.

== Managerial career ==
Pleuler was manager of SpVgg Au/Iller from 2005 until 2009, when he joined TSG Thannhausen as manager. Pleuler was sacked in December 2009 following a poor start to the season.

On 10 April 2012, Pleuler was appointed as manager of FC Albstadt 07, following the departure of Öner Topal. On 11 March 2015, Pleuler announced he would resign at the end of the season, following three years at the club.

On 27 July 2016, Pleuler was appointed manager of FC Sportfreunde Heppenheim. After two years, he was sacked in November 2018 after a run of poor results.

== Personal life ==
Pleuler lives in Bensheim and has two children.
