= Dedé (footballer, born 1978) =

Brazilian footballer (born 1978)

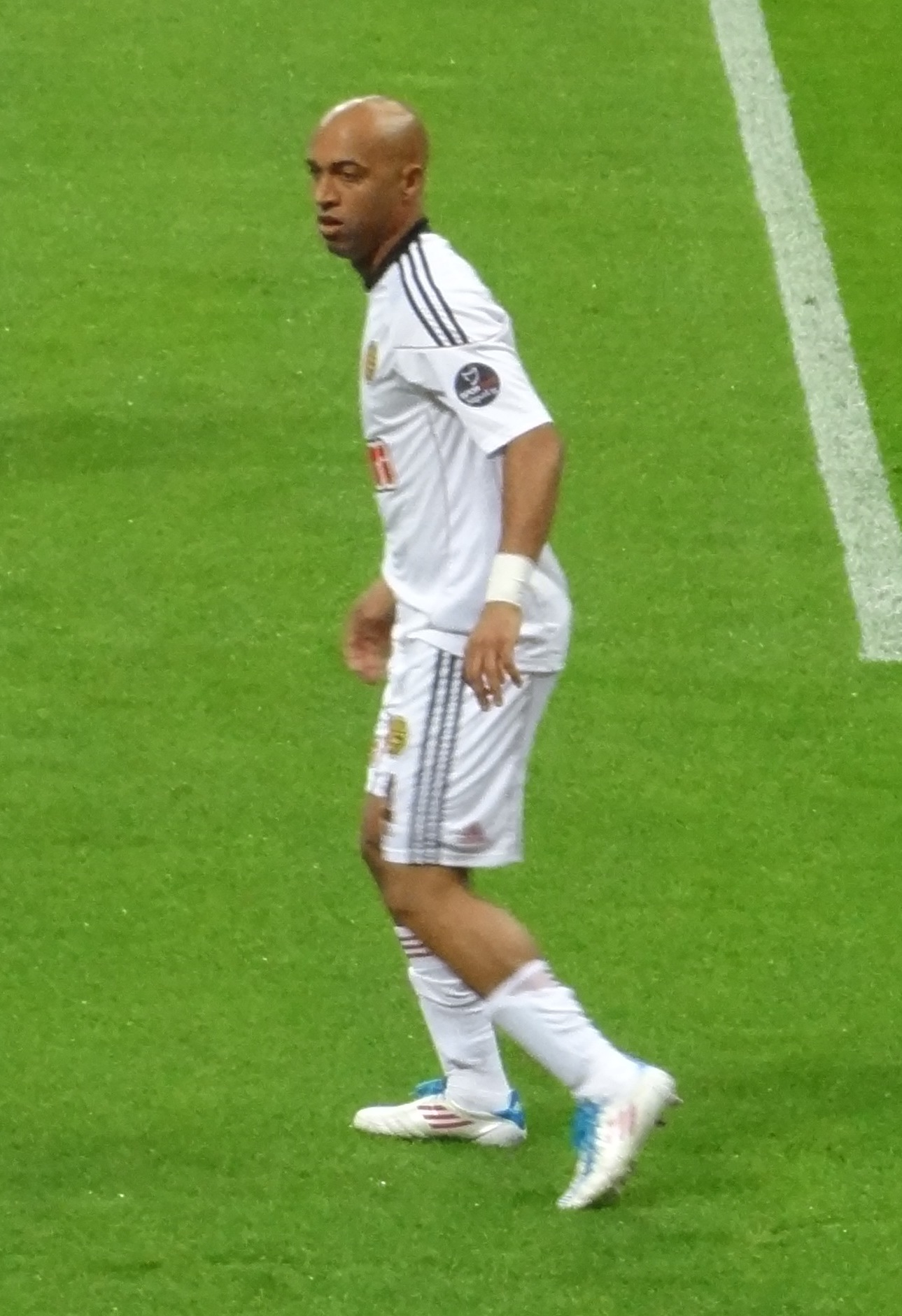
- Dedé playing with Eskişehirspor in 2011

Personal information
- Full name: Leonardo de Deus Santos
- Date of birth: 18 April 1978 (age 48)
- Place of birth: Belo Horizonte, Brazil
- Height: 1.76 m (5 ft 9 in)
- Position: Left back

Team information
- Current team: Eskişehirspor (assistant)

Senior career*
Years	Team	Apps	(Gls)
1996–1998	Atlético Mineiro	36	(3)
1998–2011	Borussia Dortmund	322	(12)
2010–2011	Borussia Dortmund II	3	(0)
2011–2014	Eskişehirspor	75	(4)
Total		436	(19)

International career
1999	Brazil U23	1	(0)
2004	Brazil	1	(0)

Managerial career
- 2015: Eskişehirspor (assistant)
Medal record
Borussia Dortmund
Winner	Bundesliga	2002
Winner	Bundesliga	2011
- * Club domestic league appearances and goals

Leonardo de Deus Santos (born 18 April 1978), known as Dedé, is a retired Brazilian professional footballer who played as either a left back or left midfielder.

He played 13 years of his career with Borussia Dortmund, appearing in more than 400 official games and winning two Bundesliga championships.

== Club career ==
=== Atlético Mineiro ===
Born in Belo Horizonte, Minas Gerais as the second of six brothers, Dedé was introduced to football at an early age, playing three-a-side matches with his brothers in his parents' apartment. "Our living room was the biggest room and also our playing field, with the doors to the kitchen and the bedroom as our goals. Well, you can imagine, we always broke things in the living room." On club level he first played for local Clube Atlético Mineiro, appearing in 30 Série A games in the 1997 season as the team finished in fourth position (two goals).

Also in that year, Dedé was awarded with the Bola de Prata award by magazine Placar, being chosen the best player in his position in the national league.

=== Borussia Dortmund ===
Dedé signed for Germany's Borussia Dortmund for the 1998–99 campaign, aged only 20. He made his Bundesliga debut on 14 August 1998, being stretchered off in the early minutes of an eventual 1–2 away loss against VfB Stuttgart, but finished his first year with 29 appearances as the Black Yellow finished fourth.

In the following season, Dedé was joined at Borussia by compatriot Evanílson, and the two proceeded to form an efficient wingback partnership in the following four years, being essential as the club won the 2002 league and reached that year's UEFA Cup final (with the player appearing in a total of 45 official games during the campaign, scoring once); he never appeared in less than 30 games from 2004 to 2008.

Afterwards, as his countryman before him, Dedé also begun suffering with injury problems, also facing stiff left-back competition from younger Marcel Schmelzer. He only appeared in 33 league matches in his last three seasons combined, including just four in 2010–11 for his second national championship.

=== Later years ===
On 27 July 2011, 33-year-old Dedé signed for Turkish club Eskişehirspor. He retired after three seasons in the Süper Lig, being subsequently appointed assistant coach under former Borussia boss Michael Skibbe.

== International career ==
Dedé earned his first and only cap for Brazil in April 2004, in a 4–1 friendly win over Hungary. Earlier that year, he had expressed a desire to represent the German national team. The Qatar Football Association also offered Dedé to represent their national team in 2004 despite having no ties to the country, FIFA blocked his switch of nationality and tightened eligibility requirements as a result.

== Personal life ==
Dedé's brothers, Cacá and Leandro, were also footballers. They too had (short) spells in Germany, with the latter coinciding with him at Borussia Dortmund.

== Honours ==
Atlético Mineiro

- Copa CONMEBOL: 1997

Borussia Dortmund

- Bundesliga: 2001–02, 2010–11
- UEFA Cup: Runner-up 2001–02
- DFB-Pokal: Runner-up 2007–08
- DFB-Ligapokal: Runner-up 2003
