= Rainer Scharinger =

German former professional footballer (born 1967)

Personal information
- Full name: Rainer Scharinger
- Date of birth: 4 March 1967 (age 59)
- Place of birth: Karlsruhe, West Germany
- Height: 1.85 m (6 ft 1 in)
- Position: Midfielder

Youth career
- TSV Spessart
- ASV Durlach

Senior career*
Years	Team	Apps	(Gls)
1987–1993	Karlsruher SC	1	(0)
1993–1995	VfR Mannheim	65	(9)
1997–1999	Karlsruher SC	11	(0)
1999–2001	SSV Ulm	60	(11)
2001–2002	Stuttgarter Kickers	30	(2)
2002–2003	SV Sandhausen	8	(0)
2003–2006	Bahlinger SC	25	(1)
Total		200	(23)

Managerial career
- 2003: SV Sandhausen
- 2003–2006: Bahlinger SC
- 2007–2009: 1899 Hoffenheim II
- 2009–2010: VfR Aalen
- 2011: Karlsruher SC
- 2012–2013: SCR Altach
- 2021: Sonnenhof Großaspach (caretaker)
- * Club domestic league appearances and goals

Rainer Scharinger (born 4 March 1967) is a German former professional footballer who is now a football manager. He was most recently the manager of Sonnenhof Großaspach.

== Managerial career ==
Scharinger was named manager of Karlsruher SC on 2 March 2011 as the successor of the sacked Uwe Rapolder Following a 5–1 defeat against Dynamo Dresden he was sacked on 31 October 2011.
