= Oliver Otto =

German footballer

Personal information
- Full name: Oliver Martin Otto
- Date of birth: 21 November 1972 (age 53)
- Place of birth: Germany
- Position: Midfielder

Senior career*
Years	Team	Apps	(Gls)
-1994	VfB Stuttgart	6	(1)
1994-2001	SSV Ulm 1846	192	(9)
2001-2002	Akratitos F.C.		
2002-2003	SV Waldhof Mannheim	15	(0)
2003-2004/05	Borussia Fulda		
2004/05-2008	SSV Reutlingen 05	94	(6)
2008-2011	VfL Kirchheim/Teck	48	(1)
- * Club domestic league appearances and goals

Oliver Otto (born 21 November 1972 in Germany) is a German retired footballer.
