= Joachim Stadler =

German footballer

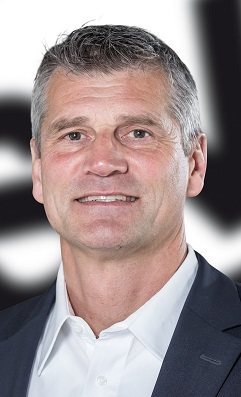

Personal information
- Date of birth: 15 January 1970 (age 56)
- Place of birth: Mosbach, West Germany
- Height: 1.91 m (6 ft 3 in)
- Position: Defender

Youth career
- SV Schwetzingen
- FV Mosbach
- Waldhof Mannheim
- VfB Breitenbronn
- 1. FC Kaiserslautern

Senior career*
Years	Team	Apps	(Gls)
1989–1991	1. FC Kaiserslautern	20	(1)
1991–1997	Borussia Mönchengladbach	79	(1)
1997–2000	SSV Ulm	78	(1)
2000–2001	Akratitos		
2001–2002	Patraikos		
2002–2003	FC Augsburg	20	(1)
- * Club domestic league appearances and goals

Joachim Stadler (born 15 January 1970 in Mosbach) is a German former professional footballer who played as a defender.

== Honours ==
1. FC Kaiserslautern

- DFB-Pokal: 1989–90
- Bundesliga: 1990–91

Borussia Mönchengladbach

- DFB-Pokal: 1994–95
