= Bernd Maier =

German footballer

Personal information
- Date of birth: 30 November 1974 (age 51)
- Place of birth: Giengen, Germany
- Height: 1.72 m (5 ft 7 1/2 in)
- Position: Defensive midfielder

Senior career*
Years	Team	Apps	(Gls)
1996–2001	SSV Ulm 1846	86	(3)
2001–2002	1. FC Saarbrücken	10	(1)
2002–2003	SSV Ulm 1846		
2003–2007	VfR Aalen	121	(4)
2007–2010	1. FC Heidenheim	47	(4)
Total		264	(12)
- * Club domestic league appearances and goals

Bernd Maier (born 30 November 1974) is a German former footballer who played as a defensive midfielder. He played in the Bundesliga with SSV Ulm 1846.
