= Goool.de =

German sports brand

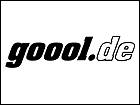

Goool.de was a German brand of Goool.de Sportswear GmbH, selling sports and leisure clothing, sporting goods and most notably, team kits. The company was a subsidiary of Bundesliga club Borussia Dortmund.

== Establishment and ownership ==
From 2000 to 2008, Borussia Dortmund established its own brand of sportswear to compete against industry giants like Adidas, Puma and Nike. This is the first and so far only attempt of this type by teams in the Bundesliga. The company, Goool.de, mainly manufactured and sold clothing for sports (especially football team jerseys and workout kits), gloves, balls and other sporting goods.

Goool.de Sportswear GmbH was founded and based in Dortmund and sales started on 25 May 2000. The managing director, Willi Kuehne (then Head of Merchandising) and Michael Meier (former manager of the first team) hoped to generate revenue outside gaming operations to become more independent from the sporting success of the first team. A subsequent IPO of the subsidiary was planned.

== Sale of the brand ==
During the refurbishment of the financially ailing Borussia Dortmund, the "Goool.de" brand was sold for 20 million euros to the Cologne Gerling Insurance Group on 20 September 2000. Parts of the Borussia trademarks were deposited as collateral as part of the deal. The rights for the brand was then leased back to the Borussia Dortmund for an annual license fee of 1.47 million euros.

== Profitability ==
In the 2001/2002 season, according to a report from the sports magazine Kicker, Goool.de recorded sales of 4.9 million euros and a profit of 110,600 euros. However, the financial year 2005/2006 ended with a loss of 1.3 million euros.

Borussia Dortmund, the owner of the company, was equipped by Goool.de from 1 July 2000 to 30 June 2004. However, as of the 2004/2005 season, Borussia Dortmund was again (as in 1990 to June 2000) equipped by Nike, and subsequently Kappa.

Goool.de had also equipped other football clubs with its sportswear. But these were lower-league sides, including SCB Viktoria Köln (formerly SCB Prussia Cologne) from the Oberliga Nordrhein in 2002 and Kickers Offenbach from the Regionalliga Süd / 2. Bundesliga from 1 July 2004 to 30 June 2008 and 1. FC Dynamo Dresden from the Regionalliga Nord / 2. Bundesliga from 1 July 2002 to 30 June 2005.

For a short time, Goool.de also supplied equipment for ice hockey and curling. The German national ice hockey team wore off-field clothing from goool.de between October 2003 and May 2005 and EHC Dortmund were also equipped by the company in 2006/2007. The German Curling federation was equipped by goool.de from 1 April 2004 to 30 July 2005.

== Cessation of business ==
The company was never able to meet the original expectations of gaining permanent and notable market share in the German sportswear industry. The attempt to establish itself in the low-budget market, did not yield any significant results.

In 2006, Goool.de Sportswear GmbH bought back the stadium rights that were deposited by them.

The business operations of Goool.de Sportswear GmbH, namely the production and sale of sports and leisure clothing, ceased on 30 June 2008. On 13 June 2008 the company name was changed into BVB Stadion Holding GmbH at the commercial registration. The domain www.goool.de is now deserted.
