= Kai Oswald =

German former football player (born 1977)

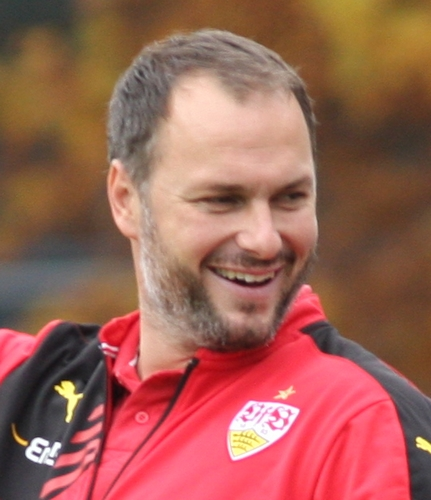

Personal information
- Date of birth: 29 November 1977 (age 48)
- Place of birth: Geislingen an der Steige, West Germany
- Height: 1.85 m (6 ft 1 in)
- Position: Defender

Team information
- Current team: VfB Stuttgart (U16 Manager)

Youth career
- SC Geislingen
- TG Böhmenkirch

Senior career*
Years	Team	Apps	(Gls)
–1998	VfB Stuttgart II		
1998–1999	VfB Stuttgart	5	(0)
1999–2002	FC Hansa Rostock	66	(3)
2002–2003	Hannover 96	2	(0)
2003–2004	→ MSV Duisburg (loan)	21	(0)
2004–2005	Karlsruher SC	17	(0)
2006	SpVgg Unterhaching	20	(1)
2007–2008	FC Carl Zeiss Jena	1	(0)

Managerial career
- 2013–2015: VfB Stuttgart (U15)
- 2015: VfB Stuttgart (U17)
- 2015–2016: VfB Stuttgart (assistant)
- 2016: VfB Stuttgart (U19)
- 2017–: VfB Stuttgart (U16)
- * Club domestic league appearances and goals

Kai Oswald (born 29 November 1977 in Geislingen an der Steige) is a German former football player. Oswald is currently the manager of VfB Stuttgart's U16 squad.

He played for five seasons in the Bundesliga for VfB Stuttgart, FC Hansa Rostock and Hannover 96.

== Coaching career ==
Oswald started his coaching career as a youth coach of VfB Stuttgart. After a period as assistant manager for several of the youth teams from U14 to U19, Oswald was in charge of the U15's for two years before he in the summer 2015 was promoted to manager of the U17's.

In November 2015, he was promoted to first team assistant manager under Jürgen Kramny. From the summer 2016, he took charge of the U19s before at the end of the year taking charge of the U16s.

== Honours ==
- DFB-Ligapokal finalist: 1998
