= Janusz Góra =

Polish footballer (born 1963)

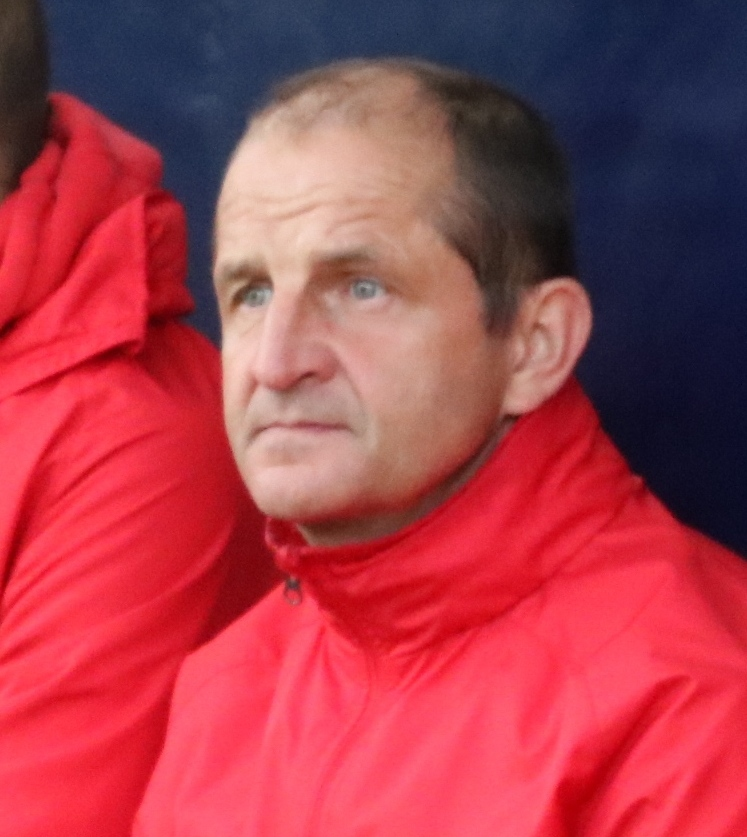

Personal information
- Date of birth: 8 July 1963 (age 63)
- Place of birth: Bielawa, Poland
- Height: 1.77 m (5 ft 9 1/2 in)
- Position: Defender

Youth career
- Bielawianka Bielawa

Senior career*
Years	Team	Apps	(Gls)
1984–1985	Górnik Wałbrzych	19	(1)
1985–1987	Śląsk Wrocław	47	(3)
1987	Górnik Wałbrzych	3	(0)
1987–1992	Śląsk Wrocław	134	(20)
1992–1997	Stuttgarter Kickers	110	(10)
1997–2001	SSV Ulm	109	(20)
2001–2003	FC Augsburg	47	(7)
2003–2006	SSV Ulm	73	(7)
Total		542	(68)

International career
1989–1992	Poland	11	(0)

Managerial career
- 2004–2009: SSV Ulm II
- 2010–2011: SSV Ulm
- 2013: Red Bull Salzburg U16
- 2017–2018: FC Liefering
- 2019: FC Liefering (caretaker)
- 2021: Lech Poznań (caretaker)
- 2023: Śląsk Wrocław U19
- * Club domestic league appearances and goals

Janusz Góra (born 8 July 1963) is a Polish professional football manager and former player who played for Górnik Wałbrzych, Śląsk Wrocław, Stuttgarter Kickers, SSV Ulm 1846 and FC Augsburg. He was most recently the head of Śląsk Wrocław's youth coaching department. He also represented the Poland national team 11 times between 1989 and 1992.

Góra is well known for his emotional outburst following a 2–1 defeat against Hansa Rostock, a match in which four Ulm players were sent off.

He was the interim coach of the Polish Ekstraklasa club Lech Poznań, fulfilling his duties once in a prestigious league game against Legia Warsaw, on 11 April 2021.

On 9 March 2022, he joined Piotr Tworek's staff at Śląsk Wrocław as an assistant coach.
