= Fredi Bobic =

German footballer

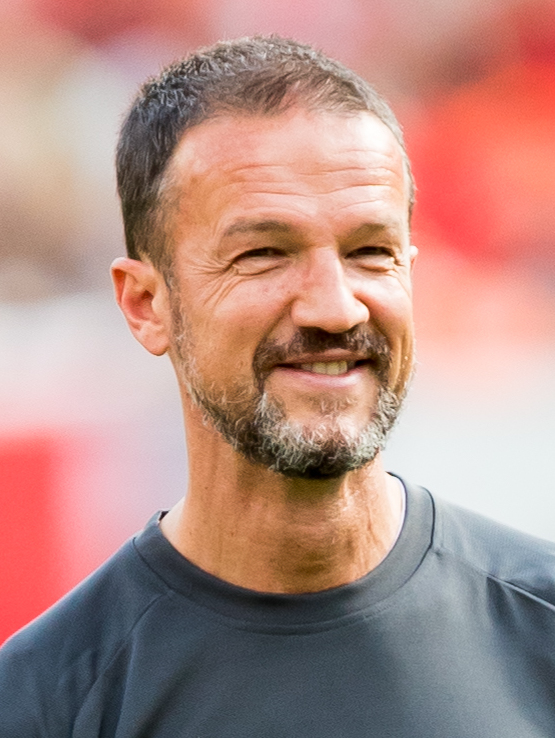
- Bobic in 2019

Personal information
- Date of birth: 30 October 1971 (age 54)
- Place of birth: Maribor, Slovenia
- Height: 1.88 m (6 ft 2 in)
- Position: Striker

Team information
- Current team: Legia Warsaw (head of football operations & sporting director)

Youth career
- 1978–1980: VfR Bad Cannstatt
- 1980–1986: VfB Stuttgart II
- 1986–1990: Stuttgarter Kickers

Senior career*
Years	Team	Apps	(Gls)
1990–1992	TSF Ditzingen	62	(32)
1992–1994	Stuttgarter Kickers	62	(26)
1994–1999	VfB Stuttgart	148	(69)
1999–2002	Borussia Dortmund	56	(17)
2002	→ Bolton Wanderers (loan)	16	(4)
2002–2003	Hannover 96	27	(14)
2003–2005	Hertha BSC	54	(8)
2006	Rijeka	8	(2)
Total		433	(172)

International career
1994–2004	Germany	37	(10)
Medal record
VfB Stuttgart
Winner	DFB-Pokal	1997
Runner-up	DFB Liga-Pokal	1997
Runner-up	UEFA Cup Winners' Cup	1998
Runner-up	DFB Liga-Pokal	1998
NK Rijeka
Winner	Croatian Cup	2006
Germany
Winner	European Championship	1996
- * Club domestic league appearances and goals

Fredi Bobic (Slovene: Fredi Bobič, born 30 October 1971) is a German football executive and former player who played as a striker. He is currently the head of football operations and the sporting director at Ekstraklasa club Legia Warsaw.

== Club career ==
Bobic was born in Maribor, SFR Yugoslavia, to a Slovene father and a Croatian mother. A few months after his birth, his parents emigrated with him to West Germany and settled down first in Ditzingen, then in Stuttgart. There, he started playing football at VfR Bad Cannstatt but soon switched to the youth team of VfB Stuttgart. While in Stuttgart, he also acquired German citizenship.

Bobic reached his prime in the mid-1990s at VfB Stuttgart in the Bundesliga. In his first Bundesliga season (1994–95), he scored a goal in each of his first five games, so he became a candidate for the Germany national team after only a few appearances in the first German league. In 1996, he was the Bundesliga's top scorer with 17 goals. At Stuttgart, he formed part of a successful attacking line-up, along with strike partner Giovane Élber and attacking midfielder Krasimir Balakov, known as the "magic triangle".

After four years in Stuttgart, in 1999 he signed with Borussia Dortmund and was the club's top scorer in both 1999–2000 and 2000–01. However, after the signings of Jan Koller and Márcio Amoroso in the summer of 2001, he soon fell out of favor and played only three games in the first half of 2001–02 season.

Subsequently, Bobic was loaned to the Premier League side Bolton Wanderers, where he had a successful spell, playing a key role in keeping Bolton in the Premiership. His hat-trick in the 4–1 win against Ipswich at the Reebok Stadium ensured Bolton stayed up, and remained the last Bolton hat-trick in a competitive game until Joe Mason in the 2014–15 season. He scored once more for Bolton, in a 3–2 victory over Aston Villa.

After returning from England, Bobic was signed by newly promoted Bundesliga side Hannover 96 where he reestablished himself as one of the league's top scorers, netting 14 times in 27 games.

In 2003, he was signed by Hertha BSC, where he played for two seasons, scoring 8 goals in 54 games.

He last played for Croatian outfit NK Rijeka before retiring in June 2006, at the end of the 2005–06 season.

== International career ==
Bobic won 37 caps (10 goals) for the Germany national team and was part of the UEFA Euro 1996 winning squad. He also played at UEFA Euro 2004, having returned to the national team in 2002 after a four-year absence.

== Managerial career ==
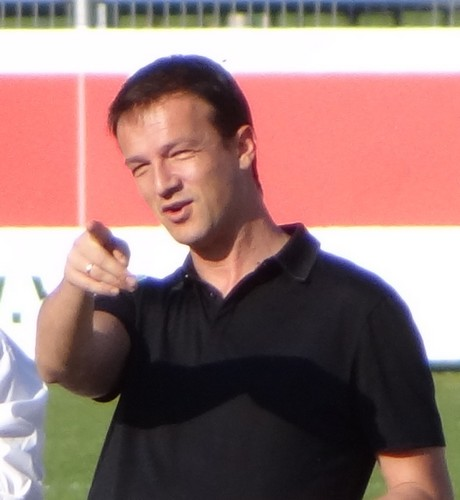
Bobic with VfB Stuttgart

Bobic signed a contract as a managing director of Bulgarian club Chernomorets Burgas on 25 March 2009 and worked in the club with his former teammate Krasimir Balakov.

On 27 July 2010, Bobic became new director of sport of VfB Stuttgart. On 20 January 2012, he extended his contract with VfB Stuttgart until June 2016. He took on the role as board representative for sport of the club on 10 April 2013. Bobic was sacked on 24 September 2014.

On 1 June 2016, Bobic became sporting director of Eintracht Frankfurt. During his term the club won the DFB-Pokal after beating Bayern Munich in the final (3–1).

On 14 April 2021, Hertha BSC announced its decision to hire Bobic as their new managing director for sport starting 1 July 2021. Bobic was sacked on 28 January 2023 after a 2–0 loss to 1. FC Union in the Berlin derby.

In April 2025, Bobic was appointed head of operations at Polish top-flight club Legia Warsaw. On 31 May 2026, he replaced Michał Żewłakow as Legia's sporting director.

== Career statistics ==
=== Club ===
Appearances and goals by club, season and competition
Club	Season	League			National cup (Note: Includes DFB-Pokal, Croatian Cup)		League cup (Note: Includes Ligapokal)		Continental		Total	
Club	Season	Division	Apps	Goals	Apps	Goals	Apps	Goals	Apps	Goals	Apps	Goals
TSF Ditzingen	1990–91	Verbandsliga Württemberg	28	13	—		—		—		28	13
TSF Ditzingen	1991–92	Oberliga Baden-Württemberg	34	19	—		—		—		34	19
TSF Ditzingen	Total		62	32	0	0	0	0	0	0	62	32
Stuttgarter Kickers	1992–93	2. Bundesliga	30	10	1	0	—		—		31	10
Stuttgarter Kickers	1993–94	2. Bundesliga	32	16	1	0	—		—		33	16
Stuttgarter Kickers	Total		62	26	2	0	0	0	0	0	64	26
VfB Stuttgart	1994–95	Bundesliga	32	12	3	1	—		—		35	13
VfB Stuttgart	1995–96	Bundesliga	26	17	1	1	—		—		27	18
VfB Stuttgart	1996–97	Bundesliga	33	19	5	2	—		—		38	21
VfB Stuttgart	1997–98	Bundesliga	29	13	5	4	2	0	8 (Note: Appearances in UEFA Cup Winners' Cup)	5	44	22
VfB Stuttgart	1998–99	Bundesliga	28	8	3	0	3	1	4 (Note: Appearance(s) in UEFA Cup)	3	38	12
VfB Stuttgart	Total		148	69	17	8	5	1	12	8	182	86
Borussia Dortmund	1999–2000	Bundesliga	29	7	1	0	2	1	11 (Note: Seven appearances and three goals in UEFA Champions League, four goals and one goal in UEFA Cup)	4	43	12
Borussia Dortmund	2000–01	Bundesliga	24	10	1	0	—		—		25	10
Borussia Dortmund	2001–02	Bundesliga	3	0	1	0	1	1	7 (Note: Six appearances in UEFA Champions League, one appearance in UEFA Cup)	0	12	1
Borussia Dortmund	Total		56	17	3	0	3	2	18	4	80	23
Bolton Wanderers (loan)	2001–02	Premier League	16	4	0	0	—		—		16	4
Hannover 96	2002–03	Bundesliga	27	14	0	0	—		—		27	14
Hertha BSC	2003–04	Bundesliga	32	7	2	0	1	1	2	0	37	8
Hertha BSC	2004–05	Bundesliga	22	1	2	0	—		—		24	1
Hertha BSC	Total		54	8	4	0	1	1	2	0	61	9
NK Rijeka	2005–06	Prva HNL	8	2	2	1	—		—		10	3
Career total			433	172	28	9	9	4	32	12	502	197

=== International ===
Scores and results list Germany's goal tally first, score column indicates score after each Bobic goal.

List of international goals scored by Fredi Bobic
No.	Date	Venue	Opponent	Score	Result	Competition
1	23 August 1995	King Baudouin Stadium, Brussels, Belgium	Belgium	2–1	2–1	Friendly
2	9 October 1996	Hrazdan Stadium, Yerevan, Armenia	Armenia	4–0	5–1	1998 FIFA World Cup qualification
3	20 November 2002	Arena AufSchalke, Gelsenkirchen, Germany	Netherlands	1–1	1–3	Friendly
4	12 February 2003	Estadio Son Moix, Mallorca, Spain	Spain	1–1	1–3	Friendly
5	1 June 2003	Volkswagen-Arena, Wolfsburg, Germany	Canada	3–1	4–1	Friendly
6	7 June 2003	Hampden Park, Glasgow, Scotland	Scotland	1–0	1–1	UEFA Euro 2004 qualifying
7	11 June 2003	Tórsvøllur, Tórshavn, Faroe Islands	Faroe Islands	2–0	2–0	UEFA Euro 2004 qualifying
8	10 September 2003	Westfalenstadion, Dortmund, Germany	Scotland	1–0	2–1	UEFA Euro 2004 qualifying
9	11 October 2003	Volksparkstadion, Hamburg, Germany	Iceland	2–0	3–0	UEFA Euro 2004 qualifying
10	27 May 2004	Dreisamstadion, Freiburg, Germany	Malta	7–0	7–0	Friendly

== Honours ==
VfB Stuttgart

- DFB-Pokal: 1996–97
- UEFA Cup Winners' Cup runner-up: 1997–98

Borussia Dortmund

- Bundesliga: 2001–02

NK Rijeka

- Croatian Cup: 2005–06

Germany

- UEFA European Championship: 1996

Individual

- Bundesliga top scorer: 1995–96
- kicker Bundesliga Team of the Season: 1995–96
