= Oliver Unsöld =

German footballer

Personal information
- Date of birth: 21 October 1973
- Height: 1.81 m (5 ft 11 in)
- Position: Defender

Senior career*
Years	Team	Apps	(Gls)
–1993	SSV Ulm		
1993–1995	FC Gundelfingen		
1995–1996	SpVgg Au/Iller		
1996–2001	SSV Ulm		
2001–2002	Greuther Fürth		
2002–2003	SSV Reutlingen		
2003–2004	Sportfreunde Siegen		
2004–2005	Olympia Laupheim		

Managerial career
- Olympia Laupheim (assistant)
- Olympia Laupheim
- SSV Ulm II
- 2010–2013: SSV Ulm (assistant)
- 2013: SSV Ulm (youth)
- 2013–2014: SSV Ulm
- 2017: FC Burlafingen
- 2018–: SC Ichenhausen
- * Club domestic league appearances and goals

Oliver Unsöld (born 21 October 1973) is a German football former player and current manager who played as a defender.

== Career ==
Unsold started his career with SSV Ulm.
