= Miroslav Stević =

Serbian footballer

Personal information
- Full name: Miroslav Stević
- Date of birth: 7 January 1970 (age 56)
- Place of birth: Ljubovija, SFR Yugoslavia
- Height: 1.79 m (5 ft 10 in)
- Position: Midfielder

Youth career
- Bratstvo Bratunac

Senior career*
| Years | Team | Apps | (Gls) |
| 1988 | Jedinstvo Bihać | 24 | (6) |
| 1989 | Partizan | 6 | (0) |
| 1989–1991 | Rad | 62 | (4) |
| 1992 | Grasshoppers | 9 | (0) |
| 1992–1994 | Dynamo Dresden | 55 | (4) |
| 1994–1998 | 1860 Munich | 104 | (3) |
| 1999–2002 | Borussia Dortmund | 91 | (8) |
| 2002–2003 | Fenerbahçe | 18 | (1) |
| 2003–2004 | VfL Bochum | 21 | (1) |
| 2005 | SpVgg Unterhaching | 22 | (0) |
| Total | | 412 | (27) |

International career
| 1990–1991 | Yugoslavia U21 | 4 | (2) |
| 1998 | FR Yugoslavia | 6 | (0) |
- * Club domestic league appearances and goals

Miroslav Stević (Serbian Cyrillic: Мирослав Стевић; born 7 January 1970) is a Serbian retired footballer who played as a midfielder.

At international level, Stević represented FR Yugoslavia at the 1998 FIFA World Cup.

== Club career ==
Stević made his senior debut with Partizan in the 1988–89 season. He then spent two and a half years at Rad, playing regularly in the Yugoslav First League, before moving abroad to Grasshoppers in the 1992 winter transfer window. After only six months in Switzerland, Stević secured a transfer to German club Dynamo Dresden in the summer of 1992. He stayed two seasons there, before switching to TSV 1860 Munich in the summer of 1994. In the following four and a half years, Stević made over 100 Bundesliga appearances for the Lions, before transferring to Borussia Dortmund in the 1999 winter transfer window. He was a member of the team that won the league's title in 2002.

In the summer of 2002, Stević moved to Turkey and signed with Fenerbahçe. He only stayed one season in the country, before returning to Germany. Stević went on to play for VfL Bochum and SpVgg Unterhaching, before retiring from the game.

== International career ==
Stević made his debut for FR Yugoslavia in a 3–0 win over Tunisia on 28 January 1998. He earned a total of six caps for the national team, including a 2–2 draw against Germany at the 1998 FIFA World Cup.

== Post-playing career ==
In February 2009, Stević was appointed director of football at TSV 1860 Munich. Some of his signings included his compatriots Antonio Rukavina, Nikola Gulan and Đorđe Rakić. In April 2011, it was announced that Stević would leave the position on 30 June 2011.

== Honours ==
Partizan

- Yugoslav Cup: 1988–89

Borussia Dortmund

- Bundesliga: 2001–02
