= Beer money =

British Army daily allowance (1800–1873)

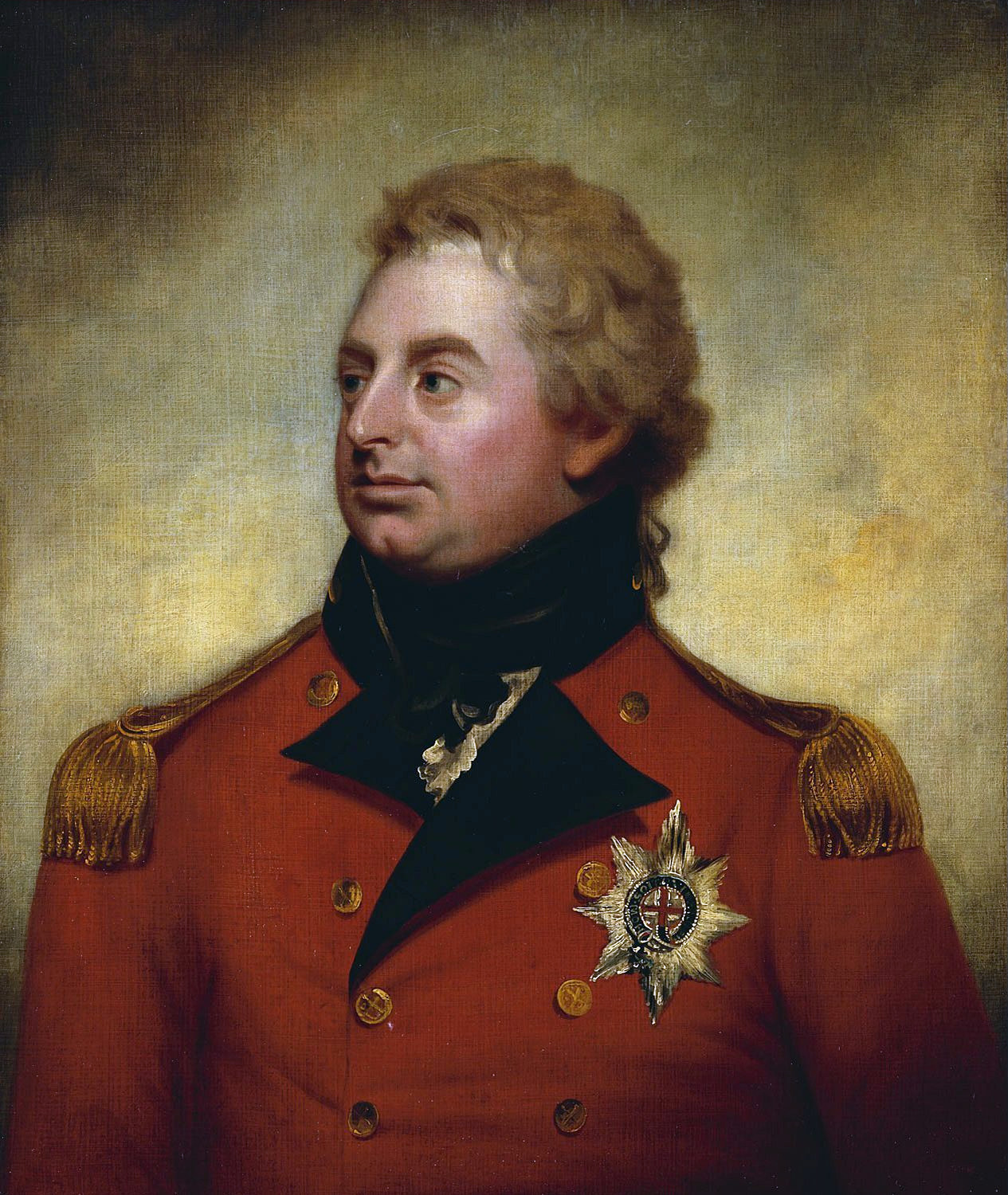
The Duke of York and Albany, who started the practise

Beer money is the nickname for an allowance, established in the year 1800, that was given to other ranks in the British Army. The practice was started at the suggestion of the Prince Frederick, Duke of York and Albany. Beer money payments were 1 penny per day and was a replacement for a daily issuance of beer or spirits while troops were on home service. The allowance continued until 1873, when it was rolled into the soldier's daily pay. At the same time stoppages made for the supply of meat and bread ceased and these supplied free of charge to the men. The phrase "beer money" is still commonly used in the British Army, and to a lesser extent in England, as a colloquialism for personal money set aside for entertainment, such as going to a pub.
