= Francis Bugri =

German footballer (born 1980)

Personal information
- Date of birth: 9 November 1980 (age 45)
- Place of birth: Eschwege, West Germany
- Height: 1.76 m (5 ft 9 in)
- Position: Midfielder

Youth career
- –1995: KSV Hessen Kassel
- 1995–1998: Borussia Dortmund

Senior career*
Years	Team	Apps	(Gls)
1998–2004	Borussia Dortmund II	85	(13)
1999–2002	Borussia Dortmund	4	(0)
2004–2005	VfB Lübeck	21	(2)
2005	KSV Hessen Kassel	14	(0)
2006	Kickers Emden	1	(0)
2006–2007	Brabrand IF		
2007–2008	SpVgg Erkenschwick	22	(3)
2008–2009	Sportfreunde Lotte	15	(2)
2009–2011	TuS Eving-Lindenhorst		
2011–2014	ASC 09 Dortmund	2	(0)

International career
1997	Germany U17	5	(0)
2000	Germany U21	1	(0)
- * Club domestic league appearances and goals

Francis Bugri (born 9 November 1980) is a German former professional footballer who played as a midfielder.

== Club career ==
A Borussia Dortmund youth product, Bugri won one national title with the club's under-17 team and two with the under-19 team. At the 1997 FIFA U-17 World Championship, he played alongside Sebastian Deisler, Sebastian Kehl und Roman Weidenfeller and was voted into the competitions All Star Team.

He made four Bundesliga appearances with the club, his last coming on 17 November 2001 as a substitute in the last minutes of a 3–1 win against 1860 Munich. At the end of the season, he won the Bundesliga title with Borussia Dortmund.

Bugri retired from playing in summer 2014.

== Personal life ==
Bugri is the son of a Ghanaian father and Romanian mother and was born in Eschwege.

== Honours ==
Borussia Dortmund

- Bundesliga: 2001–02
- UEFA Cup runner-up: 2001–02

Germany U16

- UEFA European Under-16 Championship third place: 1997

== Filmography ==
=== Films ===
Year	Film	Role	Notes
2003	Die Champions	Himself	Documentary
2010	Halbzeit - Vom Traum ins Leben	Himself	Documentary
