= Leandro Fonseca (footballer, born 1975) =

Brazilian footballer

Leandro
Personal information
- Full name: Leandro Fonseca
- Date of birth: 14 February 1975 (age 51)
- Place of birth: Jaboticabal, Brazil
- Height: 1.78 m (5 ft 10 in)
- Position: Striker

Senior career*
Years	Team	Apps	(Gls)
1993	Jaboticabal	8	(4)
1994	Carl Zeiss Jena	1	(0)
1995	Matsubara	25	(10)
1995–1996	St. Gallen	32	(4)
1996–1997	FC Wil	21	(11)
1997–1999	Yverdon-Sport	85	(51)
2000–2001	SSV Ulm	50	(11)
2001	Coritiba	7	(1)
2002	Lausanne-Sport	12	(9)
2002–2003	Neuchâtel Xamax	34	(17)
2003–2004	Young Boys	34	(17)
2004–2005	Hannover 96	20	(2)
2005–2006	Grasshoppers	11	(0)
2006–2007	Thun	18	(2)
2007–2008	Yverdon-Sport	0	(0)
- * Club domestic league appearances and goals

Leandro Fonseca (born 14 February 1975 in Jaboticabal) is a Brazilian former professional footballer who played as a striker.
