= Giuseppe Reina =

German footballer

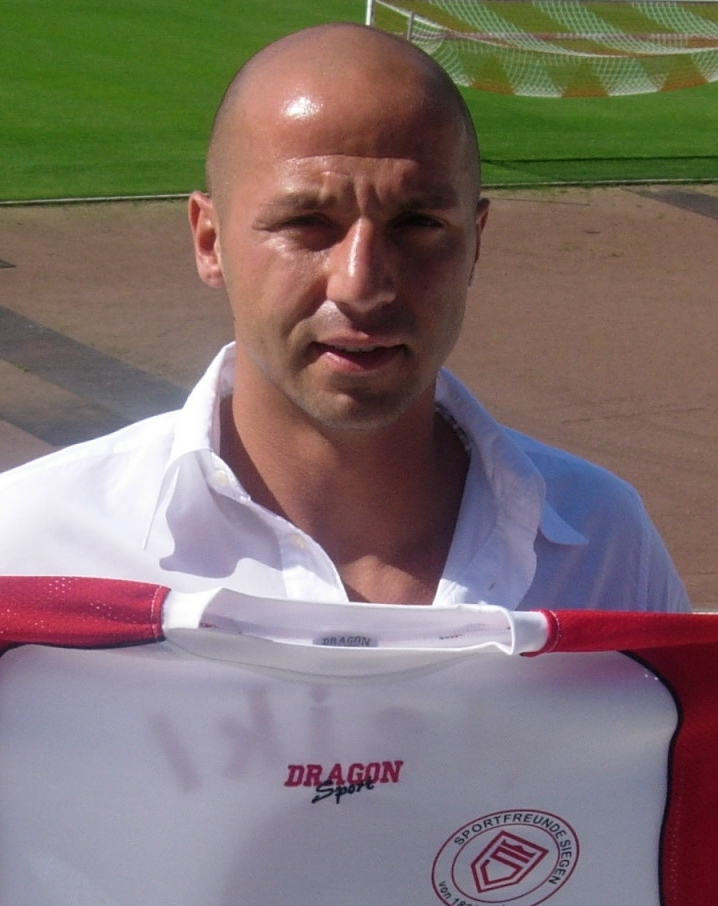
- Reina with Sportfreunde Siegen in 2005

Personal information
- Date of birth: 15 April 1972 (age 54)
- Place of birth: Unna, West Germany
- Height: 1.78 m (5 ft 10 in)
- Position: Striker

Youth career
- –1990: Rot Weiß Unna

Senior career*
Years	Team	Apps	(Gls)
1990–1993	Königsborner SV		
1993–1996	SG Wattenscheid 09	56	(15)
1996–1999	Arminia Bielefeld	97	(22)
1999–2003	Borussia Dortmund	84	(17)
2004–2005	Hertha BSC	23	(4)
2005–2006	Sportfreunde Siegen	14	(1)
Total		274	(59)
- * Club domestic league appearances and goals

Giuseppe "Billy" Reina (born 15 April 1972) is a German former professional footballer who played as a striker. He spent nine seasons in the Bundesliga with Arminia Bielefeld, Borussia Dortmund and Hertha BSC.

== Career ==
Reina was born in Unna. He is of Italian descent.

For the 2005–06 season, he joined Sportfreunde Siegen who played in the 2. Bundesliga at the time.

== Arminia Bielefeld contract ==
Whilst signing for Arminia Bielefeld, Reina had an unusual stipulation inserted into his contract stating that the club must build a new house for him for every year that he spent with them. Because the type or size of the houses were not specified, the club made three Lego houses for Reina, leading to a legal disagreement that was settled out of court.

== Honours ==
Borussia Dortmund

- Bundesliga: 2001–02
