= Evanílson (footballer, born 1975) =

Brazilian footballer

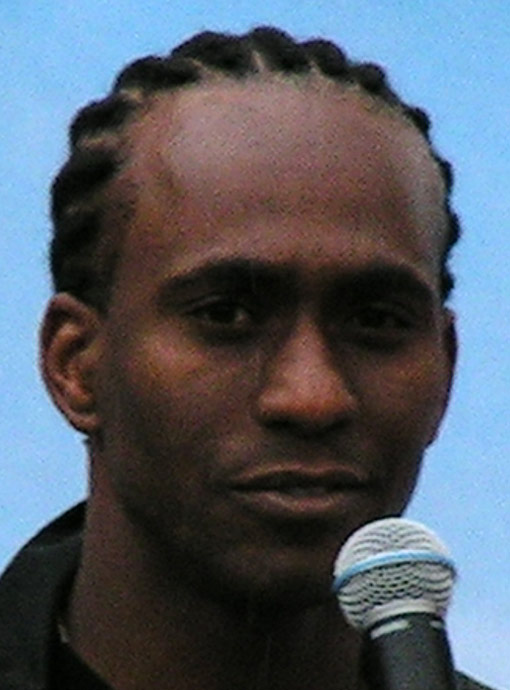
- Evanílson in 2006

Personal information
- Full name: Evanílson Aparecido Ferreira
- Date of birth: 12 September 1975 (age 51)
- Place of birth: Diamantina, Brazil
- Height: 1.78 m (5 ft 10 in)
- Position: Wingback

Youth career
- América-MG

Senior career*
Years	Team	Apps	(Gls)
1996–1998	América-MG	19	(1)
1999	Cruzeiro		
1999–2005	Borussia Dortmund	123	(4)
2005	Atlético Mineiro	7	(0)
2006	1. FC Köln	3	(0)
2006	Atlético Paranaense	7	(2)
2007	Sport	2	(0)
2008	Vitória	0	(0)
2009–2010	América-MG	7	(2)
2011	Timbaúba		
2012	Independente Limeira		
2012–2013	Botafogo-PB		

International career
1999–2001	Brazil	13	(0)
- * Club domestic league appearances and goals

Evanílson Aparecido Ferreira (born 12 September 1975), known simply as Evanílson, is a Brazilian former professional footballer.

A player of wide range who spent most of his career with Borussia Dortmund, he could play as either a right back or midfielder.

== Club career ==
Born in Diamantina, Minas Gerais, Evanílson started his senior career with América Futebol Clube (MG), joining Cruzeiro Esporte Clube for the 1999 season. On 16 August of that year he left the Belo Horizonte club and signed with Borussia Dortmund, making his Bundesliga debut 13 days later and being sent off in a 1–0 away win against SSV Ulm 1846.

Evanílson's contractual situation was somewhat complex: in 2001, his compatriot Márcio Amoroso moved from Parma A.C. to Dortmund for €25 million. In return, Evanílson was sold in the opposite direction for €17.5 million, for accounting reasons; Dortmund then received Evanílson on loan, only paying "beer money" for this move and, in 2003, a contractual clause was triggered which forced Dortmund to buy him back for €15 million.

During four seasons, Evanílson made an efficient wingback partnership at the German club with another Brazilian, Dedé – arrived one season before him – as the Black Yellows won the 2002 national championship with 27 games and one goal from the player, also reaching the season's UEFA Cup final (nine appearances, seven complete). In his final two years, however, he appeared rarely due to several injuries, namely a serious cruciate ligament one, and returned in late April 2005 to his country, joining Clube Atlético Mineiro on a two-year contract, which was prematurely terminated due to lack of salary payments, with the subsequent court action.

On 17 January 2006, Evanílson's returned to Germany and signed a five-month contract with 1. FC Köln, appearing in only one complete game in a relegation-ending season, the 1–0 loss at Hannover 96 on 18 March. He closed out his professional career at the age of 35, after playing rarely for four different clubs in Brazil, his last being his first América de Minas Gerais.

== International career ==
Evanílson gained 13 caps for Brazil in one year, playing in two games at the 1999 Copa América as Cafu's backup, with the national team winning the tournament in Paraguay.

Additionally, he was selected for two FIFA Confederation Cups. In the 1999 edition, he appeared in four games, including the 8–2 semi-final routing of Saudi Arabia, as the Seleção finished as runners-up.

== Honours ==
América-MG

- Campeonato Brasileiro Série B: 1997

Borussia Dortmund

- Bundesliga: 2001–02
- UEFA Cup runner-up: 2001–02
- DFB-Ligapokal runner-up: 2003

Sport Club do Recife

- Campeonato Pernambucano: 2007

Brazil

- Copa América: 1999
- FIFA Confederations Cup runner-up: 1999
