= Sead Kapetanović =

Bosnian footballer

Personal information
- Date of birth: 21 January 1972 (age 54)
- Place of birth: Sarajevo, SFR Yugoslavia
- Height: 1.80 m (5 ft 11 in)
- Position: Midfielder

Senior career*
Years	Team	Apps	(Gls)
1989–1992	Željezničar	29	(1)
1992–1993	Viktoria Aschaffenburg	0	(0)
1993–1994	SV Wiesbaden	0	(0)
1994–1995	FSV Frankfurt	33	(6)
1995–1999	VfL Wolfsburg	104	(4)
1999–2001	Borussia Dortmund	9	(0)
2003	FK Sarajevo		

International career
1996–2000	Bosnia and Herzegovina	14	(0)
- * Club domestic league appearances and goals

Sead Kapetanović (born 21 January 1972) is a Bosnian retired footballer.

== Club career ==
Although he came from family known for supporting and even playing for FK Sarajevo (his brother was a professional footballer too), his career began in their biggest rivals, FK Željezničar. His first division debut came in 1990 and he even scored a goal. In 1992, War in Bosnia-Herzegovina escalated and he went to Germany. First, he was playing for some low division clubs, and in the 1994–95 season he moved to second division FSV Frankfurt. In 1995, he moved to VfL Wolfsburg and two years later won promotion to Bundesliga. He collected 104 league appearances for the club until he signed a contract with Borussia Dortmund in summer of 1999. Over the course of two seasons, he did not get much chance to play regularly and that is why he decided to come back to Bosnia and Herzegovina. In total, he made 57 appearances and scored two goals in the Bundesliga. After coming back to his homeland, he played a couple of games for FK Sarajevo, and then retired from professional football.

== International career ==
He made his debut for Bosnia and Herzegovina in a November 1996 friendly match away against Italy and has earned a total of 14 caps, scoring no goals. His final international was a March 2000 friendly against Macedonia.
