= 1999–2000 Bundesliga =

37th season of the Bundesliga

Bundesliga
- Season: 1999–2000
- Dates: 13 August 1999 – 20 May 2000
- Champions: Bayern Munich; 15th Bundesliga title 16th German title
- Promoted: Arminia Bielefeld; Unterhaching; Ulm
- Relegated: Ulm; Arminia Bielefeld; Duisburg
- Champions League: Bayern Munich; Bayer Leverkusen; Hamburg; 1860 Munich
- UEFA Cup: Kaiserslautern; Hertha BSC; Werder Bremen (domestic cup finalists)
- Intertoto Cup: Wolfsburg; Stuttgart
- Matches: 306
- Goals: 885 (2.89 per match)
- Top goalscorer: Martin Max (19)
- Biggest home win: seven games with a differential of +5 each (6–1 twice, 5–0 five times)
- Biggest away win: Ulm 1–9 Leverkusen (18 March 2000)
- Highest scoring: Ulm 1–9 Leverkusen (10 goals) (18 March 2000)

The 1999–2000 Bundesliga was the 37th season of the Bundesliga, Germany's premier football league. It began on 13 August 1999 and ended on 20 May 2000. FC Bayern Munich were the defending champions.

== Competition modus ==
Every team played two games against each other team, one at home and one away. Teams received three points for a win and one point for a draw. If two or more teams were tied on points, places were determined by goal difference and, if still tied, by goals scored. The team with the most points were crowned champions while the three teams with the fewest points were relegated to 2. Bundesliga.

== Team changes to 1998–99 ==
1. FC Nürnberg, VfL Bochum and Borussia Mönchengladbach were relegated to the 2. Bundesliga after finishing in the last three places. They were replaced by Arminia Bielefeld, SpVgg Unterhaching and SSV Ulm.

== Season overview ==
Five matches before the end of the league, Bayer Leverkusen had 61 points and defending champions Bayern Munich was in 60. At the 30th fixture, Bayer 04 got 3 points ahead, and continued winning until the 33rd round. Before the final fixture start, Bayer had 73 points, with Bayern having 70. However, Leverkusen lost away to Unterhaching 2–0, and Bayern celebrated the championship winning against Werder Bremen 3–1 at home, due to their superior goal difference over Bayer 04.

== Team overview ==
Location of teams in Bundesliga 1999–2000

Club	Location	Ground	Capacity
Hertha BSC	Berlin	Olympiastadion	76,000
Arminia Bielefeld*	Bielefeld	Stadion Alm	26,600
SV Werder Bremen	Bremen	Weserstadion	36,000
Borussia Dortmund	Dortmund	Westfalenstadion	68,600
MSV Duisburg	Duisburg	Wedaustadion	30,128
Eintracht Frankfurt	Frankfurt am Main	Waldstadion	62,000
SC Freiburg	Freiburg im Breisgau	Dreisamstadion	25,000
Hamburger SV	Hamburg	Volksparkstadion	62,000
1. FC Kaiserslautern	Kaiserslautern	Fritz-Walter-Stadion	41,500
Bayer 04 Leverkusen	Leverkusen	BayArena	22,500
TSV 1860 Munich	Munich	Olympiastadion	63,000
FC Bayern Munich	Munich	Olympiastadion	63,000
FC Hansa Rostock	Rostock	Ostseestadion	25,850
FC Schalke 04	Gelsenkirchen	Parkstadion	70,000
VfB Stuttgart	Stuttgart	Gottlieb-Daimler-Stadion	53,700
SSV Ulm*	Ulm	Donaustadion	23,500
SpVgg Unterhaching*	Unterhaching	Stadion am Sportpark	11,300
VfL Wolfsburg	Wolfsburg	VfL-Stadion am Elsterweg	21,600

(*) Promoted from 2. Bundesliga.

== League table ==
Pos	Team	Pld	W	D	L	GF	GA	GD	Pts	Qualification or relegation
1	Bayern Munich (C)	34	22	7	5	73	28	+45	73	Qualification to Champions League group stage
2	Bayer Leverkusen	34	21	10	3	74	36	+38	73	Qualification to Champions League group stage
3	Hamburger SV	34	16	11	7	63	39	+24	59	Qualification to Champions League third qualifying round
4	1860 Munich	34	14	11	9	55	48	+7	53	Qualification to Champions League third qualifying round
5	1. FC Kaiserslautern	34	15	5	14	54	59	−5	50	Qualification to UEFA Cup first round
6	Hertha BSC	34	13	11	10	39	46	−7	50	Qualification to UEFA Cup first round
7	VfL Wolfsburg	34	12	13	9	51	58	−7	49	Qualification to Intertoto Cup third round
8	VfB Stuttgart	34	14	6	14	44	47	−3	48	Qualification to Intertoto Cup second round
9	Werder Bremen	34	13	8	13	65	52	+13	47	Qualification to UEFA Cup first round (Note: As domestic cup winners FC Bayern Munich had qualified for UEFA Champions League, the UEFA Cup place belonging to the domestic cup winners was transferred to Werder Bremen.)
10	SpVgg Unterhaching	34	12	8	14	40	42	−2	44	
11	Borussia Dortmund	34	9	13	12	41	38	+3	40	
12	SC Freiburg	34	10	10	14	45	50	−5	40	
13	Schalke 04	34	8	15	11	42	44	−2	39 (Note: Head-to-head was used as a tie-breaker between Schalke 04 and Frankfurt.)	
14	Eintracht Frankfurt (Note: Eintracht Frankfurt were docked two points because of licensing irregularities.)	34	12	5	17	42	44	−2	39	
15	Hansa Rostock	34	8	14	12	44	60	−16	38	
16	SSV Ulm 1846 (R)	34	9	8	17	36	62	−26	35	Relegation to 2. Bundesliga
17	Arminia Bielefeld (R)	34	7	9	18	40	61	−21	30	Relegation to 2. Bundesliga
18	MSV Duisburg (R)	34	4	10	20	37	71	−34	22	Relegation to 2. Bundesliga

Source: www.dfb.de
Rules for classification: 1) points; 2) goal difference; 3) number of goals scored.
(C) Champions; (R) Relegated

== Results ==
Home \ Away	BSC	DSC	SVW	BVB	DUI	SGE	SCF	HSV	FCK	B04	M60	FCB	ROS	S04	VFB	ULM	UNT	WOB
Hertha BSC	—	2–0	1–1	0–3	2–1	1–0	0–0	2–1	0–1	0–0	1–1	1–1	5–2	2–1	1–1	3–0	2–1	0–0
Arminia Bielefeld	1–1	—	2–2	0–2	0–1	1–1	2–1	3–0	1–2	1–2	2–2	0–3	2–2	1–2	1–2	4–1	1–0	0–0
Werder Bremen	4–1	3–1	—	3–2	4–0	3–1	5–2	2–1	5–0	1–3	1–3	0–2	2–1	0–1	2–1	2–2	2–2	2–2
Borussia Dortmund	4–0	1–3	1–3	—	2–2	1–0	1–1	0–1	0–1	1–1	1–1	0–1	3–0	1–1	1–1	1–1	1–3	2–1
MSV Duisburg	0–0	0–3	0–1	2–2	—	2–3	1–2	1–1	2–2	0–0	3–0	1–2	2–2	1–1	1–3	0–0	2–0	2–3
Eintracht Frankfurt	4–0	2–1	1–0	1–1	2–2	—	2–0	3–0	0–1	1–2	3–1	1–2	0–0	0–2	0–1	2–1	3–0	4–0
SC Freiburg	0–1	1–1	2–1	1–1	3–0	2–3	—	0–2	2–1	0–0	3–0	1–2	5–0	2–1	0–2	2–0	4–3	1–1
Hamburger SV	5–1	5–0	0–0	1–1	6–1	1–0	2–0	—	2–1	0–2	2–0	0–0	1–0	3–1	3–0	1–2	3–0	2–2
1. FC Kaiserslautern	1–2	0–2	4–3	1–0	3–2	1–0	0–2	2–0	—	1–3	1–1	0–2	2–2	2–1	1–2	6–2	4–2	2–2
Bayer Leverkusen	3–1	4–1	3–2	3–1	3–0	4–1	1–1	2–2	3–1	—	1–1	2–0	1–1	3–2	1–0	4–1	2–1	4–1
1860 Munich	2–1	5–0	1–0	0–3	4–1	2–0	3–1	0–0	2–1	1–2	—	1–0	4–3	3–3	1–1	4–1	2–1	1–2
Bayern Munich	3–1	2–1	3–1	1–1	4–1	4–1	6–1	2–2	2–2	4–1	1–2	—	4–1	4–1	0–1	4–0	1–0	5–0
Hansa Rostock	0–1	2–1	1–1	1–0	3–1	3–1	1–1	3–3	4–2	1–1	0–0	0–3	—	1–0	1–4	2–1	1–1	1–1
Schalke 04	1–1	1–1	3–1	0–0	3–0	0–0	2–2	1–3	1–2	1–1	2–2	1–1	0–2	—	3–0	0–0	1–0	1–1
VfB Stuttgart	1–0	3–3	0–0	1–2	4–2	0–2	1–0	1–3	0–1	1–2	1–3	2–0	3–1	0–2	—	2–0	0–2	2–5
SSV Ulm	0–1	2–0	2–1	0–1	0–3	3–0	1–1	1–2	3–1	1–9	3–0	0–1	1–1	1–1	1–1	—	1–0	2–0
SpVgg Unterhaching	1–1	2–0	1–0	1–0	2–0	1–0	1–0	1–1	1–2	2–0	1–1	0–2	1–1	3–1	2–0	1–0	—	1–1
VfL Wolfsburg	2–3	2–0	2–7	1–0	1–0	1–0	2–1	4–4	3–2	3–1	2–1	1–1	2–0	0–0	0–2	1–2	2–2	—

Source: DFB
Legend: Blue = home team win; Yellow = draw; Red = away team win.

== Top goalscorers ==
Rank	Player	Club	Goals
1	(Germany) Martin Max	1860 Munich	19
2	(Germany) Ulf Kirsten	Bayer Leverkusen	17
3	(Brazil) Giovane Élber	Bayern Munich	14
3	(Denmark) Ebbe Sand	Schalke 04	14
5	(Germany) Marco Bode	Werder Bremen	13
5	(Brazil) Paulo Sérgio	Bayern Munich	13
7	(Brazil) Aílton	Werder Bremen	12
7	(Nigeria) Jonathan Akpoborie	VfL Wolfsburg	12
7	(Germany) Michael Preetz	Hertha BSC	12
10	(Germany) Stefan Beinlich	Bayer Leverkusen	11
10	(France) Youri Djorkaeff	Kaiserslautern	11
10	(Poland) Andrzej Juskowiak	VfL Wolfsburg	11
10	(Germany) Bruno Labbadia	Arminia Bielefeld	11
10	(Tunisia) Adel Sellimi	SC Freiburg	11

== Attendances ==
No.	Team	Attendance	Change	Highest
1	Borussia Dortmund	64,641	-1,3%	68,800
2	Bayern München	52,588	-6,5%	69,000
3	Hertha BSC	46,835	-10,7%	75,000
4	Hamburger SV	41,934	72,1%	53,800
5	Schalke 04	40,543	-6,9%	62,109
6	1. FC Kaiserslautern	40,224	-2,0%	41,500
7	Eintracht Frankfurt	35,603	11,5%	58,245
8	TSV 1860	32,653	0,5%	69,000
9	VfB Stuttgart	30,235	-1,7%	47,000
10	Werder Bremen	29,834	0,2%	36,000
11	SC Freiburg	24,694	10,2%	25,000
12	Bayer Leverkusen	22,471	0,1%	22,500
13	SSV Ulm	21,711	93,7%	23,793
14	Arminia Bielefeld	19,721	62,8%	26,601
15	VfL Wolfsburg	17,196	2,9%	21,400
16	Hansa Rostock	16,153	1,3%	24,500
17	MSV Duisburg	15,115	-12,7%	30,112
18	SpVgg Unterhaching	9,576	158,0%	11,300
