= VfL-Stadion am Elsterweg =

Football stadium in Wolfsburg, Germany

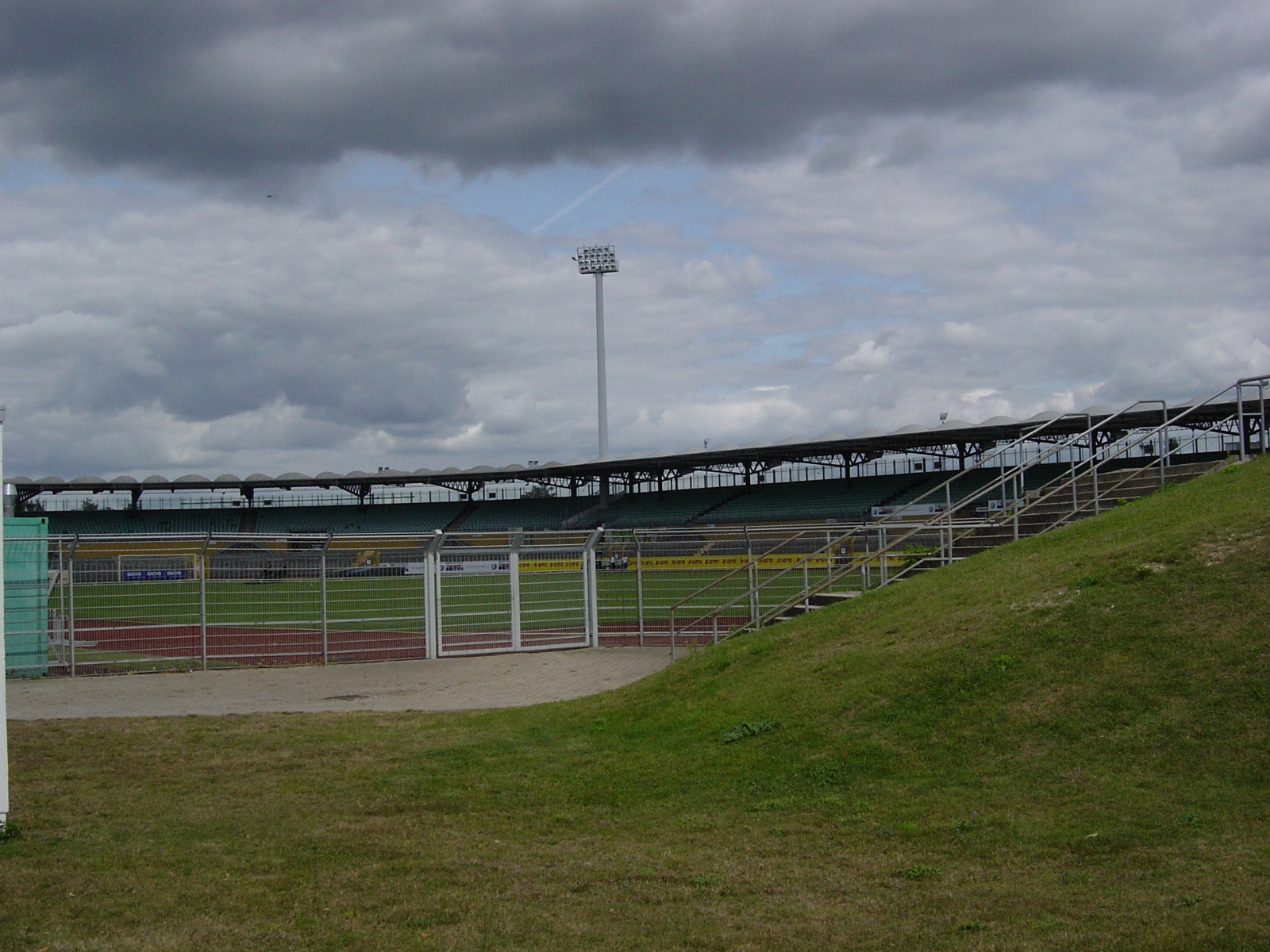
- Interactive map of VfL-Stadion am Elsterweg
- Location: Wolfsburg, Germany
- Coordinates: 52°25′31.1″N 10°47′57.9″E
- Capacity: 17,600
- Surface: Grass

Construction
- Opened: 1947
- Renovated: 1961, 1997

Tenant
- VfL Wolfsburg II

VfL-Stadion am Elsterweg (German pronunciation: [faʊ̯ ʔɛf ˈʔɛl ˈʃtaːdi̯ɔn ʔam ˈʔɛlstɐveːk], locally [-ˈʔɛlstɐveːç]) is a multi-use stadium in Wolfsburg, Germany. The stadium is able to hold 17,600 people and opened in 1947. It hosted the home matches of VfL Wolfsburg until they moved to the Volkswagen Arena when it opened in 2002. Now the stadium is used by Wolfsburg's 2nd squad, which plays in the Regionalliga Nord.

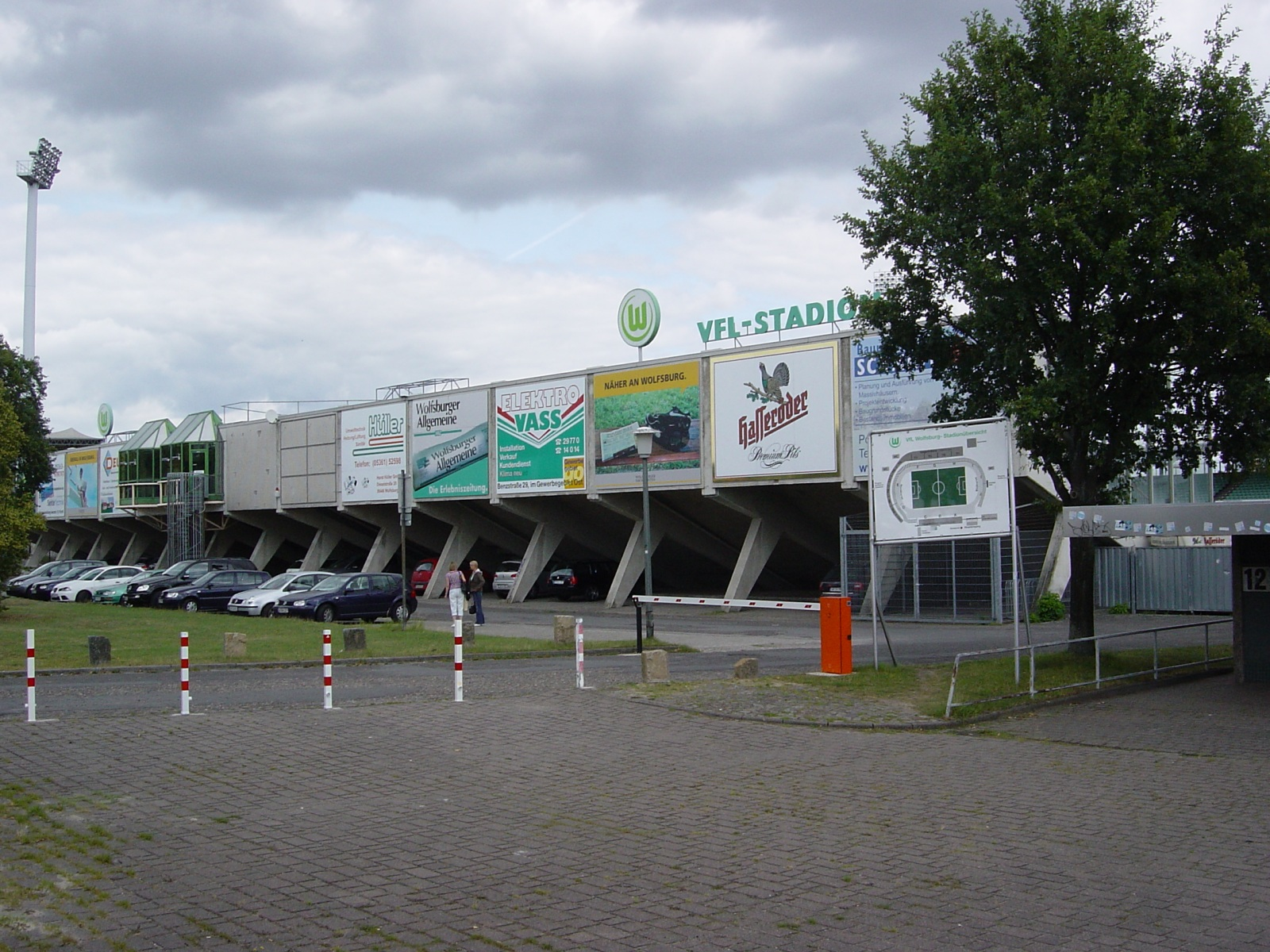
