= 2001–02 Bundesliga =

39th season of the Bundesliga

Bundesliga
- Season: 2001–02
- Dates: 28 July 2001 – 4 May 2002
- Champions: Borussia Dortmund; 3rd Bundesliga title 6th German title
- Relegated: Freiburg; Köln; St. Pauli
- Champions League: Borussia Dortmund; Bayer Leverkusen; Bayern Munich
- UEFA Cup: Hertha BSC; Schalke 04; Werder Bremen
- Intertoto Cup: Kaiserslautern; Stuttgart; 1860 Munich
- Matches: 306
- Goals: 893 (2.92 per match)
- Top goalscorer: Márcio Amoroso; Martin Max (18 goals each)

The 2001–02 Bundesliga was the 39th season of the Bundesliga. It began on 28 July 2001 and concluded on 4 May 2002.

== Teams ==
Eighteen teams competed in the league – the top fifteen teams from the previous season and the three teams promoted from the 2. Bundesliga. The promoted teams were 1. FC Nürnberg, Borussia Mönchengladbach and FC St. Pauli. 1. FC Nürnberg and Borussia Mönchengladbach returned to the top flight after an absence of two years while FC St. Pauli returned to the top fight after an absence of four years. They replaced SpVgg Unterhaching, Eintracht Frankfurt and VfL Bochum, ending their top flight spells of two, three and one years respectively.

== Team overview ==
Location of teams in Bundesliga 2001–02

=== Stadiums ===
Club	Location	Ground	Capacity
Hertha BSC	Berlin	Olympiastadion	76,000
SV Werder Bremen	Bremen	Weserstadion	36,000
FC Energie Cottbus	Cottbus	Stadion der Freundschaft	21,000
Borussia Dortmund	Dortmund	Westfalenstadion	68,600
SC Freiburg	Freiburg im Breisgau	Dreisamstadion	25,000
Hamburger SV	Hamburg	Volksparkstadion	62,000
1. FC Kaiserslautern	Kaiserslautern	Fritz-Walter-Stadion	41,500
1. FC Köln	Cologne	Müngersdorfer Stadion	46,000
Bayer 04 Leverkusen	Leverkusen	BayArena	22,500
Borussia Mönchengladbach*	Mönchengladbach	Bökelbergstadion	34,500
TSV 1860 Munich	Munich	Olympiastadion	63,000
FC Bayern Munich	Munich	Olympiastadion	63,000
1. FC Nürnberg*	Nuremberg	Frankenstadion	44,700
F.C. Hansa Rostock	Rostock	Ostseestadion	25,850
FC Schalke 04	Gelsenkirchen	Arena AufSchalke	61,973
FC St. Pauli*	Hamburg	Stadion am Millerntor	20,550
VfB Stuttgart	Stuttgart	Gottlieb-Daimler-Stadion	53,700
VfL Wolfsburg	Wolfsburg	VfL-Stadion am Elsterweg	21,600

(*) Promoted from 2. Bundesliga.

=== Personnel and sponsoring ===
Team	Manager	Kit manufacturer	Shirt sponsor
TSV 1860 Munich	(Austria) Peter Pacult	Nike	FTI Touristik
Bayer 04 Leverkusen	(Germany) Klaus Toppmöller	Adidas	RWE
FC Bayern Munich	(Switzerland) Ottmar Hitzfeld	Adidas	Opel
Borussia Dortmund	(Germany) Matthias Sammer	Goool.de	E.ON
Borussia Mönchengladbach	(Germany) Hans Meyer	Reebok	Maxdata (H)/Belinea (A)
FC Energie Cottbus	(Germany) Eduard Geyer	Jako	enviaM
SC Freiburg	(Germany) Volker Finke	Jako	NaturEnergie
Hamburger SV	(Austria) Kurt Jara	Nike	TV Spielfilm
FC Hansa Rostock	(Germany) Armin Veh	Jako	Kia
Hertha BSC	(Germany) Falko Götz	Nike	o.tel.o/Arcor
1. FC Kaiserslautern	(Germany) Andreas Brehme	Nike	Deutsche Vermögensberatung
1. FC Köln	(Germany) Friedhelm Funkel	Puma	VPV Versicherungen
1. FC Nürnberg	(Germany) Klaus Augenthaler	Adidas	Adecco
FC Schalke 04	(Netherlands) Huub Stevens	Adidas	Victoria Versicherung
FC St. Pauli	(Germany) Dietmar Demuth	Kappa	Securvita
VfB Stuttgart	(Germany) Felix Magath	Adidas	Debitel
SV Werder Bremen	(Germany) Thomas Schaaf	Kappa	None
VfL Wolfsburg	(Germany) Wolfgang Wolf	Puma	Volkswagen

== League table ==
The final table of the 1st Bundesliga, Season 2001/02

Pos	Team	Pld	W	D	L	GF	GA	GD	Pts	Qualification or relegation
1	Borussia Dortmund (C)	34	21	7	6	62	33	+29	70	Qualification to Champions League group stage
2	Bayer Leverkusen	34	21	6	7	77	38	+39	69	Qualification to Champions League group stage
3	Bayern Munich	34	20	8	6	65	25	+40	68	Qualification to Champions League third qualifying round
4	Hertha BSC	34	18	7	9	61	38	+23	61	Qualification to UEFA Cup first round
5	Schalke 04	34	18	7	9	52	36	+16	61	Qualification to UEFA Cup first round
6	Werder Bremen	34	17	5	12	54	43	+11	56	Qualification to UEFA Cup first round
7	1. FC Kaiserslautern	34	17	5	12	62	53	+9	56	Qualification to Intertoto Cup third round
8	VfB Stuttgart	34	13	11	10	47	43	+4	50	Qualification to Intertoto Cup second round
9	1860 Munich	34	15	5	14	59	59	0	50	Qualification to Intertoto Cup second round
10	VfL Wolfsburg	34	13	7	14	57	49	+8	46	
11	Hamburger SV	34	10	10	14	51	57	−6	40	
12	Borussia Mönchengladbach	34	9	12	13	41	53	−12	39	
13	Energie Cottbus	34	9	8	17	36	60	−24	35	
14	Hansa Rostock	34	9	7	18	35	54	−19	34	
15	1. FC Nürnberg	34	10	4	20	34	57	−23	34	
16	SC Freiburg (R)	34	7	9	18	37	64	−27	30	Relegation to 2. Bundesliga
17	1. FC Köln (R)	34	7	8	19	26	61	−35	29	Relegation to 2. Bundesliga
18	FC St. Pauli (R)	34	4	10	20	37	70	−33	22	Relegation to 2. Bundesliga

Source: bundesliga.de
Rules for classification: 1) points; 2) goal difference; 3) number of goals scored.
(C) Champions; (R) Relegated

== Results ==
Home \ Away	BSC	SVW	FCE	BVB	SCF	HSV	FCK	KOE	B04	BMG	M60	FCB	FCN	ROS	S04	STP	VFB	WOB
Hertha BSC	—	3–1	2–3	0–2	1–1	6–0	5–1	3–0	2–1	3–0	2–1	2–1	2–0	1–0	2–0	2–2	2–0	2–0
Werder Bremen	0–3	—	3–2	1–1	3–2	0–1	1–0	1–1	2–1	1–0	1–3	1–0	3–0	4–3	3–0	3–2	1–2	1–0
Energie Cottbus	1–0	2–1	—	0–2	2–0	1–0	0–2	2–3	2–3	3–3	1–1	0–3	1–0	3–0	2–0	4–0	0–0	3–3
Borussia Dortmund	3–1	2–1	3–0	—	0–2	1–0	3–0	2–1	1–1	3–1	2–1	0–2	2–0	2–0	1–1	1–1	1–0	4–0
SC Freiburg	1–3	3–0	3–1	1–5	—	4–3	3–1	0–0	2–2	0–1	1–3	0–2	2–0	1–1	2–0	2–2	0–2	0–0
Hamburger SV	4–0	0–4	5–2	3–4	1–1	—	2–3	4–0	1–1	3–3	2–1	0–0	3–1	0–1	0–0	4–3	2–0	1–1
1. FC Kaiserslautern	4–1	2–1	4–0	1–0	3–0	2–2	—	2–1	2–4	3–2	1–3	0–0	2–1	3–1	0–0	5–1	2–2	3–2
1. FC Köln	1–1	0–0	0–0	0–2	2–0	2–1	0–1	—	1–2	0–2	2–0	0–2	1–2	4–2	1–1	2–1	0–0	0–4
Bayer Leverkusen	2–1	1–2	2–0	4–0	4–1	4–1	2–1	2–0	—	5–0	4–0	1–1	4–2	2–0	0–1	3–1	4–1	2–1
Borussia Mönchengladbach	3–1	1–0	0–0	1–2	2–2	2–1	0–2	4–0	0–1	—	2–4	1–0	1–0	0–2	0–0	2–2	2–2	0–2
1860 Munich	0–3	3–1	1–0	1–3	5–2	1–1	0–4	3–0	1–4	2–2	—	1–5	1–0	2–0	1–2	4–2	3–3	2–1
Bayern Munich	3–0	2–2	6–0	1–1	1–0	3–0	4–1	3–0	2–0	0–0	2–1	—	0–0	3–2	3–0	2–0	4–0	3–3
1. FC Nürnberg	1–3	0–4	2–0	2–2	2–0	0–0	0–2	2–0	1–0	1–2	2–1	1–2	—	2–0	0–3	0–0	2–4	3–0
Hansa Rostock	1–1	0–1	0–0	0–2	4–0	1–1	2–1	3–0	0–3	1–1	2–2	1–0	1–0	—	1–3	1–0	1–1	1–2
Schalke 04	0–0	1–4	2–0	1–0	3–0	2–0	3–0	3–1	3–3	2–0	1–0	5–1	2–1	3–1	—	4–0	2–1	1–2
FC St. Pauli	0–0	0–3	4–0	1–2	1–0	0–4	1–1	1–2	2–2	1–1	0–3	2–1	2–3	0–1	0–2	—	1–2	3–1
VfB Stuttgart	0–0	0–0	0–0	3–2	3–0	3–0	4–3	0–0	0–2	1–1	0–1	0–2	2–3	2–1	3–0	2–0	—	2–1
VfL Wolfsburg	1–3	2–0	2–1	1–1	1–1	0–1	2–0	5–1	3–1	3–1	1–3	0–1	5–0	4–0	3–1	1–1	0–2	—

Source: DFB
Legend: Blue = home team win; Yellow = draw; Red = away team win.

== Overall ==
- Most wins - Borussia Dortmund and Bayer Leverkusen (21)
- Fewest wins - FC St. Pauli (4)
- Most draws - Borussia Mönchengladbach (12)
- Fewest draws - 1. FC Nürnberg (4)
- Most losses - 1. FC Nürnberg and FC St. Pauli (20)
- Fewest losses - Borussia Dortmund and Bayern Munich (6)
- Most goals scored - Bayer Leverkusen (77)
- Fewest goals scored - 1. FC Köln (26)
- Most goals conceded - FC St. Pauli (70)
- Fewest goals conceded - Bayern Munich (25)

== Top goalscorers ==
Rank	Player	Club	Goals
1	(Brazil) Márcio Amoroso	Borussia Dortmund	18
1	(Germany) Martin Max	1860 Munich	18
3	(Germany) Michael Ballack	Bayer Leverkusen	17
3	(Brazil) Giovane Élber	Bayern Munich	17
5	(Brazil) Aílton	Werder Bremen	16
5	(Germany) Miroslav Klose	1. FC Kaiserslautern	16
7	(Peru) Claudio Pizarro	Bayern Munich	15
8	(Germany) Oliver Neuville	Bayer Leverkusen	13
8	(Brazil) Marcelinho	Hertha BSC	13
10	(Netherlands) Arie van Lent	Borussia Mönchengladbach	12
10	(Germany) Michael Preetz	Hertha BSC	12
10	(Croatia) Tomislav Marić	VfL Wolfsburg	12

== Attendances ==
No.	Team	Average	Change	Highest
1	Borussia Dortmund	66,171	3,8%	68,600
2	Schalke 04	60,440	29,7%	60,683
3	Bayern München	53,176	7,0%	68,000
4	Hamburger SV	44,445	3,4%	55,360
5	1. FC Kaiserslautern	38,504	-1,9%	40,600
6	Hertha BSC	36,663	-9,4%	55,000
7	1. FC Köln	31,147	-9,3%	42,000
8	1. FC Nürnberg	30,671	36,8%	44,696
9	Borussia Mönchengladbach	30,231	28,9%	34,500
10	Werder Bremen	30,094	-0,8%	35,800
11	VfB Stuttgart	28,106	5,6%	54,300
12	TSV 1860	26,376	-5,8%	69,000
13	SC Freiburg	24,859	-0,1%	25,000
14	Bayer Leverkusen	22,382	-0,1%	22,500
15	FC St. Pauli	22,263	26,9%	54,130
16	Hansa Rostock	18,520	22,9%	29,500
17	Energie Cottbus	16,636	-1,2%	20,100
18	VfL Wolfsburg	14,199	-8,4%	20,400
