= 2002–03 Borussia Dortmund season =

2002–03 season of Borussia Dortmund

Borussia Dortmund
2002–03 season
- Chairman: Gerd Niebaum
- Manager: Matthias Sammer
- Bundesliga: 3rd
- DFB-Pokal: Second round
- Champions League: Second group stage
- Top goalscorer: Jan Koller (13)
Home colours	Away colours	Third colours

Borussia Dortmund played the 2002–03 season in the Bundesliga. Aside from failing to retain the Bundesliga title, Dortmund failed to reach the Champions League knockout phase, despite winning away from home against eventual champions Milan. In the end, finishing third in Bundesliga was enough to go into the qualifying phase of the Champions League for the coming season.

== Players ==
=== First-team squad ===
Squad at end of season

Note: Flags indicate national team as defined under FIFA eligibility rules; some limited exceptions apply. Players may hold more than one non-FIFA nationality.

No.	Pos.	Nation	Player
1	GK	GER	Jens Lehmann
2	DF	BRA	Evanílson
3	MF	ARG	Juan Fernández
4	DF	GER	Christian Wörns
5	MF	GER	Sebastian Kehl
6	MF	GER	Jörg Heinrich
7	DF	GER	Stefan Reuter
8	MF	GER	Torsten Frings
9	FW	CZE	Jan Koller
10	MF	CZE	Tomáš Rosický
11	FW	GER	Heiko Herrlich
12	FW	BRA	Ewerthon
13	FW	GER	Giuseppe Reina
14	DF	FRA	Guy Demel (Note: Demel was born in Orsay, France, but also qualified to represent the Ivory Coast internationally and made his international debut for Ivory Coast in 2004.)
17	DF	BRA	Dedê

No.	Pos.	Nation	Player
18	MF	GER	Lars Ricken
19	MF	GHA	Otto Addo (Note: Addo was born in Hamburg, West Germany (now Germany), but also qualified to represent Ghana internationally and made his international debut for Ghana in February 1999.)
21	DF	GER	Christoph Metzelder
22	FW	BRA	Márcio Amoroso
23	DF	MAR	Ahmed Reda Madouni (Note: Madouni was born in Casablanca, Morocco, but also qualified to represent Algeria internationally and made his international debut for Algeria in June 2005.)
24	MF	GER	David Odonkor
26	GK	GER	Roman Weidenfeller
27	DF	GER	Deniz Sahin
28	MF	GER	Francis Bugri
30	GK	GER	Michael Ratajczak
34	FW	GER	Sahr Senesie (Note: Senesie was born in Koindu, Sierra Leone, but was raised in Germany from the age of 12 and represented them at U-20 and U-21 level.)
38	MF	GER	Florian Thorwart
41	DF	GER	Timo Achenbach
43	MF	BRA	Leandro (on loan from Atlético Mineiro)

=== Left club during season ===
Note: Flags indicate national team as defined under FIFA eligibility rules; some limited exceptions apply. Players may hold more than one non-FIFA nationality.

No.	Pos.	Nation	Player
15	MF	NGR	Sunday Oliseh (on loan to VfL Bochum)
16	FW	GER	Fredi Bobic (Note: Bobic was born in Maribor, SFR Yugoslavia (now Slovenia), but was raised in Germany and made his international debut for Germany in 1994.) (to Hanover 96)
20	GK	GER	Philipp Laux (to Eintracht Braunschweig)

No.	Pos.	Nation	Player
29	MF	NOR	Jan-Derek Sørensen (to FK Lyn)
31	FW	GER	Emmanuel Krontiris (on loan to Alemannia Aachen)
—	MF	GER	Florian Kringe (on loan to 1. FC Köln)

=== Reserve team ===
Note: Flags indicate national team as defined under FIFA eligibility rules; some limited exceptions apply. Players may hold more than one non-FIFA nationality.

No.	Pos.	Nation	Player
—	GK	PER	George Forsyth
—	GK	GER	Stefan Demuth
—	DF	GER	Tobias Beckmann
—	DF	GER	Markus Brzenska
—	DF	GER	Benjamin Knoche
—	DF	GER	Bastian Pinske
—	DF	IRL	Patrick Kohlmann (Note: Kohlmann was born in Dortmund, West Germany (now Germany), but also qualified to represent the Republic of Ireland internationally through his mother and represented them at U-21 level.)
—	DF	ISR	Amos Sassi

No.	Pos.	Nation	Player
—	MF	GER	David Faralich
—	MF	GER	Stefan Hoffmann
—	MF	GER	Adrian Mahr
—	MF	GER	Uwe Seggewiß
—	MF	SCG	Mladen Kašćelan
—	FW	GER	Salvatore Gambino
—	FW	GER	Mario Jurkschat
—	FW	TUR	Mehmet Ali Şirin

== Competitions ==
=== Bundesliga ===
==== League table ====
Pos	Team	Pld	W	D	L	GF	GA	GD	Pts	Qualification or relegation
1	Bayern Munich (C)	34	23	6	5	70	25	+45	75	Qualification to Champions League group stage
2	VfB Stuttgart	34	17	8	9	53	39	+14	59	Qualification to Champions League group stage
3	Borussia Dortmund	34	15	13	6	51	27	+24	58	Qualification to Champions League third qualifying round
4	Hamburger SV	34	15	11	8	46	36	+10	56	Qualification to UEFA Cup first round
5	Hertha BSC	34	16	6	12	52	43	+9	54	Qualification to UEFA Cup first round

Source: bundesliga.de
Rules for classification: 1) points; 2) goal difference; 3) number of goals scored.
(C) Champions

==== Matches ====
- Borussia Dortmund-Hertha Berlin 2–2
- 0–1 Bart Goor (1)
- 1–1 Torsten Frings (4)
- 2–1 Ewerthon (36)
- 2–2 Andreas Neuendorf (85)
- Bayer Leverkusen-Borussia Dortmund 1–1
- 1–0 Diego Placente (23)
- 1–1 Jan Koller (61)
- Borussia Dortmund-Stuttgart 3–1
- 1–0 Jan Koller (39)
- 2–0 Leandro (66)
- 2–1 Sean Dundee (76)
- 3–1 Ewerthon (88)
- Bochum-Borussia Dortmund 0–0
- Borussia Dortmund-Schalke 04 1–1
- 0–1 Victor Agali (69)
- 1–1 Ewerthon (70)
- Hansa Rostock-Borussia Dortmund 0–1
- 0–1 Jan Koller (12)
- Borussia Dortmund-Mönchengladbach 1–0
- 1–0 Ewerthon (85)
- Hannover-Borussia Dortmund 0–3
- 0–1 Torsten Frings (42 pen)
- 0–2 Jan Koller (63)
- 0–3 Márcio Amoroso (87)
- Borussia Dortmund-Arminia Bielefeld 0–0
- Werder Bremen-Borussia Dortmund 1–4
- 0–1 Torsten Frings (2)
- 1–1 Fabian Ernst (34)
- 1–2 Dedê (71)
- 1–3 Ewerthon (74)
- 1–4 Ewerthon (85)
- Borussia Dortmund-Hamburg 1–1
- 1–0 Tomáš Rosický (68)
- 1–1 Kim Christensen (88)
- Bayern Munich-Borussia Dortmund 2–1
- 0–1 Márcio Amoroso (7)
- 1–1 Roque Santa Cruz (62)
- 2–1 Claudio Pizarro (66)
- Borussia Dortmund-1860 Munich 1–0
- 1–0 Ewerthon (6)
- Wolfsburg-Borussia Dortmund 2–0
- 1–0 Diego Klimowicz (19)
- 2–0 Diego Klimowicz (55)
- Nürnberg-Borussia Dortmund 1–2
- 1–0 David Jarolím (3)
- 1–1 Lars Ricken (54)
- 1–2 Ewerthon (78)
- Borussia Dortmund-Kaiserslautern 3–1
- 1–0 Tomasz Klos (22 og)
- 2–0 Márcio Amoroso (74)
- 3–0 Márcio Amoroso (77)
- 3–1 José Dominguez (86)
- Energie Cottbus-Borussia Dortmund 0–4
- 0–1 Jan Koller (8)
- 0–2 Ewerthon (47)
- 0–3 Márcio Amoroso (83)
- 0–4 Jan Koller (90)
- Hertha Berlin-Borussia Dortmund 2–1
- 1–0 Pál Dárdai (68)
- 1–1 Márcio Amoroso (78)
- 2–1 Marcelinho (90)
- Borussia Dortmund-Bayer Leverkusen 2–0
- 1–0 Ewerthon (3)
- 2–0 Jan Koller (29)
- Stuttgart-Borussia Dortmund 1–0
- 1–0 Zvonimir Soldo (75)
- Borussia Dortmund-Bochum 4–1
- 0–1 Delron Buckley (8)
- 1–1 Giuseppe Reina (33)
- 2–1 Jan Koller (43)
- 3–1 Torsten Frings (45 pen)
- 4–1 Torsten Frings (68 pen)
- Schalke 04-Borussia Dortmund 2–2
- 1–0 Sven Vermant (13)
- 2–0 Nico van Kerckhoven (16)
- 2–1 Jan Koller (52)
- 2–2 Ewerthon (58)
- Borussia Dortmund-Hansa Rostock 2–0
- 1–0 Dedê (23)
- 2–0 Ahmed Reda Madouni (82)
- Mönchengladbach-Borussia Dortmund 1–0
- 1–0 Mikael Forssell (63)
- Borussia Dortmund-Hannover 2–0
- 1–0 Torsten Frings (33)
- 2–0 Leandro (76)
- Arminia Bielefeld-Borussia Dortmund 0–0
- Borussia Dortmund-Werder Bremen 1–2
- 1–0 Márcio Amoroso (29)
- 1–1 Angelos Charisteas (54)
- 1–2 Fabian Ernst (86)
- Hamburg-Borussia Dortmund 1–1
- 1–0 Bernardo Romeo (65)
- 1–1 Jan Koller (68)
- Borussia Dortmund-Bayern Munich 1–0
- 1–0 Márcio Amoroso (61 pen)
- 1860 Munich-Borussia Dortmund 0–0
- Borussia Dortmund-Wolfsburg 2–2
- 1–0 Lars Ricken (15)
- 1–1 Pablo Thiam (59)
- 1–2 Pablo Thiam (62)
- 2–2 Tomáš Rosický (67)
- Borussia Dortmund-Nürnberg 4–1
- 1–0 Lars Ricken (28)
- 2–0 Lars Ricken (54)
- 3–0 Giuseppe Reina (65)
- 4–0 Jan Koller (68)
- 4–1 Saša Ćirić (89)
- Kaiserslautern-Borussia Dortmund 0–0
- Borussia Dortmund-Energie Cottbus 1–1
- 1–0 Tomáš Rosický (25)
- 1–1 Timo Rost (75)

== Statistics ==
=== Topscorers ===
- (Czech Republic) Jan Koller 13
- (Brazil) Ewerthon 11
- (Brazil) Márcio Amoroso 8
- (Germany) Torsten Frings 6
- (Germany) Lars Ricken 4
