= 2003–04 Borussia Dortmund season =

2003–04 season of Borussia Dortmund

Borussia Dortmund
2003–04 season
- Manager: Matthias Sammer
- Bundesliga: 6th
- DFB-Pokal: Second round
- Champions League: Third qualifying round
- UEFA Cup: Second round
- Top goalscorer: Jan Koller (16); Ewerthon (16)
Home colours	Away colours	Third colours

During the 2003–04 German football season, Borussia Dortmund competed in the Bundesliga.

== Season summary ==
Dortmund failed to qualify for the Champions League group stage, and followed that up with a disappointing sixth-place finish in the Bundesliga. The club's poor form was mainly a result of playmaker Tomáš Rosický's absence through virtually half of the season. The poor form led to the dismissal of coach Matthias Sammer, while the club's economy got ever more strained.

== Players ==
=== First-team squad ===
Squad at end of season

Note: Flags indicate national team as defined under FIFA eligibility rules; some limited exceptions apply. Players may hold more than one non-FIFA nationality.

No.	Pos.	Nation	Player
1	GK	GER	Roman Weidenfeller
2	DF	BRA	Evanílson (on loan from Parma)
4	DF	GER	Christian Wörns
5	MF	GER	Sebastian Kehl
6	MF	BRA	Flávio Conceição (on loan from Real Madrid)
7	DF	GER	Stefan Reuter
8	MF	GER	Torsten Frings
9	FW	CZE	Jan Koller
10	MF	CZE	Tomáš Rosický
11	FW	GER	Heiko Herrlich
12	FW	BRA	Ewerthon
14	DF	CIV	Guy Demel (Note: Demel was born in Orsay, France, but also qualified to represent the Ivory Coast internationally and made his international debut for Ivory Coast in 2004.)
15	DF	DEN	Niclas Jensen
16	MF	BRA	Leandro (on loan from Atlético Mineiro)
17	DF	BRA	Dedê
18	MF	GER	Lars Ricken

No.	Pos.	Nation	Player
19	MF	GHA	Otto Addo (Note: Addo was born in Hamburg, West Germany (now Germany), but also qualified to represent Ghana internationally and made his international debut for Ghana in February 1999.)
20	DF	GER	Malte Metzelder
21	DF	GER	Christoph Metzelder
23	DF	MAR	Ahmed Reda Madouni (Note: Madouni was born in Casablanca, Morocco, but also qualified to represent Algeria internationally and made his international debut for Algeria in June 2005.)
24	MF	GER	David Odonkor
25	FW	GER	Sahr Senesie (Note: Senesie was born in Koindu, Sierra Leone, but was raised in Germany from the age of 12 and represented Germany at U-20 and U-21 level.)
26	GK	FRA	Guillaume Warmuz
27	DF	GER	Deniz Şahin
28	DF	NOR	André Bergdølmo
30	FW	BRA	Thiago
31	MF	GER	Stefan Hoffmann
33	MF	GER	Salvatore Gambino
34	MF	ISR	Amos Sassi
35	DF	GER	Markus Brzenska
39	DF	GER	Benjamin Knoche

=== Left club during season ===
Note: Flags indicate national team as defined under FIFA eligibility rules; some limited exceptions apply. Players may hold more than one non-FIFA nationality.

No.	Pos.	Nation	Player
3	DF	ARG	Juan Fernández (on loan to River Plate)
13	FW	GER	Giuseppe Reina (to Hertha BSC)

No.	Pos.	Nation	Player
22	FW	BRA	Márcio Amoroso (released)

== Competitions ==
=== Bundesliga ===
==== League table ====
Pos	Team	Pld	W	D	L	GF	GA	GD	Pts	Qualification or relegation
4	VfB Stuttgart	34	18	10	6	52	24	+28	64	Qualification to UEFA Cup first round
5	VfL Bochum	34	15	11	8	57	39	+18	56	Qualification to UEFA Cup first round
6	Borussia Dortmund	34	16	7	11	59	48	+11	55	Qualification to Intertoto Cup third round
7	Schalke 04	34	13	11	10	49	42	+7	50	Qualification to Intertoto Cup third round
8	Hamburger SV	34	14	7	13	47	60	−13	49	Qualification to Intertoto Cup third round

Source: kicker.de
Rules for classification: 1) points; 2) goal difference; 3) number of goals scored.

==== Matches ====
- Schalke 04-Borussia Dortmund 2–2
- 1–0 Hamit Altıntop 40'
- 2–0 Hamit Altıntop 58'
- 2–1 Flávio Conceição 66'
- 2–2 Márcio Amoroso 90'
- Borussia Dortmund-Wolfsburg 4–0
- 1–0 Tomáš Rosický 25'
- 2–0 Tomáš Rosický 51'
- 3–0 Márcio Amoroso 74'
- 4–0 Jan Koller 87'
- Borussia Dortmund-1860 Munich 3–1
- 1–0 Márcio Amoroso 46'
- 2–0 Márcio Amoroso 56' (pen.)
- 3–0 Jan Koller 61'
- 3–1 Francis Kioyo 87'
- Köln-Borussia Dortmund 1–0
- 1–0 Dirk Lottner 57'
- Borussia Dortmund-Werder Bremen 2–1
- 1–0 Ewerthon 17'
- 1–1 Krisztián Lisztes 41'
- 2–1 Valérien Ismaël 70' (o.g.)
- Stuttgart-Borussia Dortmund 1–0
- 1–0 Kevin Kurányi 67'
- Borussia Dortmund-Freiburg 1–0
- 1–0 Ewerthon 68'
- Eintracht Frankfurt-Borussia Dortmund 0–1
- 0–1 Giuseppe Reina 10'
- Borussia Dortmund-Hannover 6–2
- 1–0 Ewerthon 35'
- 2–0 Lars Ricken 42'
- 3–0 Sebastian Kehl 56'
- 3–1 Vinícius 58'
- 4–1 Jan Koller 64'
- 5–1 Ewerthon 73'
- 6–1 Ewerthon 75'
- 6–2 Denis Wolf 85'
- Bochum-Borussia Dortmund 3–0
- 1–0 Vahid Hashemian 7'
- 2–0 Vahid Hashemian 57'
- 3–0 Sunday Oliseh 79'
- Borussia Dortmund-Hamburg 3–2
- 0–1 David Jarolím 14'
- 0–2 Bernardo Romeo 60'
- 1–2 Jan Koller 64'
- 2–2 Jan Koller 66' (pen.)
- 3–2 Ewerthon 69'
- Bayern Munich-Borussia Dortmund 4–1
- 1–0 Michael Ballack 27'
- 1–1 Jan Koller 49'
- 2–1 Willy Sagnol 50'
- 3–1 Hasan Salihamidžić 72'
- 4–1 Claudio Pizarro 90'
- Borussia Dortmund-Bayer Leverkusen 2–2
- 1–0 Salvatore Gambino 29'
- 2–0 Salvatore Gambino 32'
- 2–1 Oliver Neuville 35'
- 2–2 Marko Babić 77'
- Hansa Rostock-Borussia Dortmund 2–1
- 1–0 Martin Max 54'
- 1–1 Ewerthon 66'
- 2–1 Martin Max 87'
- Borussia Dortmund-Hertha Berlin 1–1
- 1–0 Leandro 69' (pen.)
- 1–1 Alexander Madlung 79'
- Mönchengladbach-Borussia Dortmund 2–1
- 1–0 Igor Demo 11'
- 1–1 Jan Koller 12'
- 2–1 Slađan Ašanin 83'
- Borussia Dortmund-Kaiserslautern 1–1
- 1–0 Jan Koller 45'
- 1–1 Lincoln 76'
- Borussia Dortmund-Schalke 04 0–1
- 0–1 Ebbe Sand 89'
- Wolfsburg-Borussia Dortmund 2–4
- 1–0 Martin Petrov 36'
- 1–1 Niclas Jensen 42'
- 1–2 Jan Koller 45'
- 1–3 Torsten Frings 53'
- 1–4 Lars Ricken 78'
- 2–4 Fernando Baiano 88'
- 1860 Munich-Borussia Dortmund 0–2
- 0–1 Ewerthon 41' (pen.)
- 0–2 Ewerthon 59'
- Borussia Dortmund-Köln 1–0
- 1–0 Ewerthon 26'
- Werder Bremen-Borussia Dortmund 2–0
- 1–0 Valérien Ismaël 56'
- 2–0 Aílton 85'
- Borussia Dortmund-Stuuttgart 0–2
- 0–1 Alexander Hleb 6'
- 0–2 Horst Heldt 81' (pen.)
- Freiburg-Borussia Dortmund 2–2
- 1–0 Roda Antar 17'
- 1–1 Dedê 45'
- 1–2 Lars Hermel 58' (o.g.)
- 2–2 Levan Tskitishvili 67'
- Borussia Dortmund-Eintracht Frankfurt 2–0
- 1–0 Ewerthon 24'
- 2–0 Jan Koller 80'
- Hannover-Borussia Dortmund 1–1
- 0–1 Torsten Frings 13'
- 1–1 Thomas Christiansen 83' (pen.)
- Borussia Dortmund-Bochum 4–1
- 1–0 Jan Koller 9'
- 1–1 Peter Madsen 14'
- 2–1 Salvatore Gambino 30'
- 3–1 Torsten Frings 45'
- 4–1 Ewerthon 53' (pen.)
- Hamburg-Borussia Dortmund 0–2
- 0–1 Torsten Frings 8'
- 0–2 Jan Koller 28'
- Borussia Dortmund-Bayern Munich 2–0
- 1–0 Ewerthon 55'
- 2–0 Christian Wörns 61'
- Bayer Leverkusen-Borussia Dortmund 3–0
- 1–0 Marko Babić 6'
- 2–0 França 22'
- 3–0 Dimitar Berbatov 54' (pen.)
- Borussia Dortmund-Hansa Rostock 4–1
- 1–0 Ahmed Reda Madouni 11'
- 2–0 Ewerthon 35'
- 3–0 Jan Koller 38'
- 3–1 Martin Max 66'
- 4–1 David Odonkor 75'
- Hertha Berlin-Borussia Dortmund 6–2
- 1–0 Sebastian Kehl 7' (o.g.)
- 2–0 Marcelinho 20'
- 3–0 Fredi Bobič 37'
- 3–1 Ewerthon 52'
- 4–1 Artur Wichniarek 58'
- 4–2 Ewerthon 80'
- 5–2 Andreas Neuendorf 86'
- 6–2 Nando Rafael 90'
- Borussia Dortmund-Mönchengladbach 3–1
- 0–1 Ivo Ulich 10'
- 1–1 Ewerthon 15'
- 2–1 Dedê 45'
- 3–1 Jan Koller 83'
- Kaiserslautern-Borussia Dortmund 1–1
- 1–0 Vratislav Lokvenc 6'
- 1–1 Jan Koller 71'

=== Champions League ===
==== Third qualifying round ====
13 August 2003	Club Brugge (Belgium)	2–1	(Germany) Borussia Dortmund	Jan Breydel Stadium, Bruges
20:30	Čeh 33'; Verheyen 44'	Report MatchCentre	Amoroso 53'	Referee: Pierluigi Collina (Italy)

27 August 2003	Borussia Dortmund (Germany)	2–1 (a.e.t.) (3–3 agg.) (2–4 p)	(Belgium) Club Brugge	Westfalenstadion, Dortmund
20:30	Amoroso 3'; Ewerthon 86'	Report MatchCentre	Mendoza 26'	Referee: Mike RIley (England)
	Penalties
	Amoroso (penalty missed); Bergdølmo (penalty missed); Koller (penalty scored); Fernández (penalty scored)		(penalty scored) Simons; (penalty scored) Čeh; (penalty scored) De Cock; (penalty scored) Mendoza

=== UEFA Cup ===
==== First round ====
- Dortmund 2-1 Austria Wien
- Austria Wein 0-1 Dortmund

==== Second round ====
- Dortmund 2-2 Sochaux
- Sochaux 4-0 Dortmund

== Top scorers ==
=== Bundesliga ===
- (Brazil) Ewerthon 16
- (Czech Republic) Jan Koller 16
- (Germany) Torsten Frings 4
- (Brazil) Márcio Amoroso 4
- (Italy) Salvatore Gambino
