= 2004–05 Borussia Dortmund season =

German football club

Borussia Dortmund
2004–05 season
- Manager: Bert van Marwijk
- Bundesliga: 7th
- DFB-Pokal: Third round
- Intertoto Cup: Third round
- Top goalscorer: Jan Koller (15)
Home colours	Away colours	Third colours

During the 2004–05 German football season, Borussia Dortmund competed in the Bundesliga.

== Season summary ==
New boss Bert van Marwijk failed to turn Dortmund's fortunes around and they finished 7th, a place lower than last season, despite earning the same number of points. However, this season they were only four points off Champions League qualification, giving hope that next season they could qualify.

== Players ==
=== First-team squad ===
Squad at end of season

Note: Flags indicate national team as defined under FIFA eligibility rules; some limited exceptions apply. Players may hold more than one non-FIFA nationality.

No.	Pos.	Nation	Player
1	GK	GER	Roman Weidenfeller
3	DF	ARG	Juan Fernández
4	DF	GER	Christian Wörns
5	MF	GER	Sebastian Kehl
6	MF	GER	Florian Kringe
7	DF	CIV	Guy Demel (Note: Demel was born in Orsay, France, but also qualified to represent the Ivory Coast internationally and made his international debut for Ivory Coast in 2004.)
9	FW	CZE	Jan Koller
10	MF	CZE	Tomáš Rosický
11	MF	GHA	Otto Addo (Note: Addo was born in Hamburg, Germany, but also qualified to represent Ghana internationally and made his international debut for Ghana in February 1999.)
12	FW	BRA	Ewerthon
14	FW	POL	Ebi Smolarek (on loan from Feyenoord)
15	DF	DEN	Niclas Jensen
16	MF	NGA	Sunday Oliseh
17	DF	BRA	Dedê
18	MF	GER	Lars Ricken
19	MF	TUR	Mehmet Akgün (Note: Akgün was born in Bielefeld, Germany, but also qualified to represent Turkey internationally and represented them at U-17 level.)
20	DF	GER	Malte Metzelder

No.	Pos.	Nation	Player
21	DF	GER	Christoph Metzelder
22	MF	GER	Marc-André Kruska
23	DF	ALG	Ahmed Reda Madouni (Note: Madouni was born in Casablanca, Morocco, but also qualified to represent Algeria internationally and made his international debut for Algeria in June 2005.)
24	MF	GER	David Odonkor
26	GK	FRA	Guillaume Warmuz
28	DF	NOR	André Bergdølmo
29	DF	GER	Sascha Rammel
31	DF	IRL	Patrick Kohlmann (Note: Kohlmann was born in Dortmund, West Germany, but also qualified to represent the Republic of Ireland internationally through his mother and represented them at U-21 level.)
33	MF	GER	Salvatore Gambino
34	DF	GER	Uwe Hünemeier
35	DF	GER	Markus Brzenska
36	GK	GER	Matthias Kleinsteiber
37	FW	TUR	Mahir Sağlık (Note: Sağlık was born in Paderborn, West Germany, but also qualified to represent Turkey internationally through his parents and represented them at U-17, U-18, U-19 and U-20 level.)
39	FW	GER	Marcus Steegmann
40	GK	GER	Sören Pirson
41	MF	GER	Marc Heitmeier

=== Left club during season ===
Note: Flags indicate national team as defined under FIFA eligibility rules; some limited exceptions apply. Players may hold more than one non-FIFA nationality.

No.	Pos.	Nation	Player
2	DF	BRA	Evanílson (to Atlético Mineiro)
25	FW	GER	Sahr Senesie (Note: Senesie was born in Koindu, Sierra Leone, but was raised in Germany from the age of 12 and represented them at U-20 and U-21 level.) (on loan to Grasshoppers)

No.	Pos.	Nation	Player
30	FW	BRA	Thiago (released)

== Competitions ==
=== Bundesliga ===
==== League table ====
Pos	Team	Pld	W	D	L	GF	GA	GD	Pts	Qualification or relegation
5	VfB Stuttgart	34	17	7	10	54	40	+14	58	Qualification to UEFA Cup first round (Note: Since DFB Cup winners Bayern Munich and finalists Schalke 04 both qualified for the Champions League, the UEFA Cup place for the cup-winners was given to 6th placed Bayer Leverkusen.)
6	Bayer Leverkusen	34	16	9	9	65	44	+21	57	Qualification to UEFA Cup first round
7	Borussia Dortmund	34	15	10	9	47	44	+3	55	Qualification to Intertoto Cup third round
8	Hamburger SV	34	16	3	15	55	50	+5	51	Qualification to Intertoto Cup second round
9	VfL Wolfsburg	34	15	3	16	49	51	−2	48	Qualification to Intertoto Cup second round

Rules for classification: 1) points; 2) goal difference; 3) number of goals scored.
