= Guillaume Warmuz =

French footballer (born 1970)

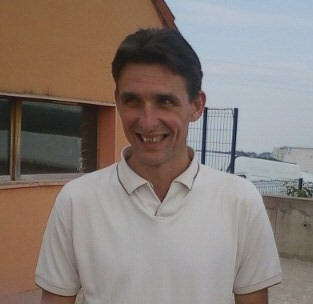

Personal information
- Date of birth: 22 May 1970 (age 56)
- Place of birth: Saint-Vallier, France
- Height: 1.87 m (6 ft 2 in)
- Position: Goalkeeper

Youth career
- INF Vichy
- INF Clairefontaine
- 1988–1989: Marseille

Senior career*
| Years | Team | Apps | (Gls) |
| 1989–1990 | Marseille | 0 | (0) |
| 1990–1992 | Louhans-Cuiseaux | 66 | (0) |
| 1992–2002 | Lens | 351 | (0) |
| 2003 | Arsenal | 0 | (0) |
| 2003–2005 | Borussia Dortmund | 25 | (0) |
| 2003 | Borussia Dortmund II | 4 | (0) |
| 2005–2007 | Monaco | 23 | (0) |
| Total | | 469 | (0) |

International career
| 1990–1991 | France U21 | 11 | (0) |

Managerial career
- 2008: Gueugnon (sporting director)
- 2008: UNFP
- 2012: Auxerre (goalkeeper coach)
- 2017: Beaune (assistant)
- 2017–2018: Montceau Bourgogne
- * Club domestic league appearances and goals

Guillaume Warmuz (born 22 May 1970) is a French football coach and former player who played as a goalkeeper.

He played 374 games in Ligue 1 during 13 seasons, representing in the competition Lens and Monaco.

== Playing career ==
Born in Saint-Vallier, Saône-et-Loire, Warmuz started his professional with Marseille in 1989. After no Ligue 1 appearances in his sole season, he moved to Louhans-Cuiseaux from Ligue 2, where he was first-choice.

In the 1992 summer Warmuz signed for top flight club Lens, making his club debut on 8 August in a 3–0 home defeat by Auxerre. Over the course of the following ten years he went on to play in 427 official games for Les Sang et Or, winning the 1998 national championship and the following year's Coupe de la Ligue.

In January 2003, then a free agent Warmuz signed a short-term contract for Arsenal, as a replacement for the injured Rami Shaaban. He left in July after failing to appear in any matches, and joined Borussia Dortmund after Jens Lehmann had just left for the Gunners.

Warmuz featured in 17 Bundesliga matches in his first season, as the other goalkeeper Roman Weidenfeller did the same and the club finished in sixth position. He left in 2005 to Monaco back in his country, retiring at the end of the 2006–07 campaign at the age of 37.

== Managerial career ==
On 16 February 2008, Warmuz was appointed director of football at Gueugnon, lasting eight days in office. From May to December 2012, he acted as Auxerre's goalkeeping coach.

On 1 June 2017, Warmuz was appointed as manager of Championnat National 2 side Montceau Bourgogne. In April 2018, with his side facing relegation, Warmuz resigned as manager.

== Career statistics ==
=== Club ===
Appearances and goals by club, season and competition
| Club | Season | League | | | National cup | | League cup | | Europe | | Other | | Total | |
| Club | Season | Division | Apps | Goals | Apps | Goals | Apps | Goals | Apps | Goals | Apps | Goals | Apps | Goals |
|---|---|---|---|---|---|---|---|---|---|---|---|---|---|---|
| Louhans-Cuiseaux | 1990–91 | Division 2 | 34 | 0 | 0 | 0 | — | | — | | — | | 34 | 0 |
| Louhans-Cuiseaux | 1991–92 | Division 2 | 32 | 0 | 0 | 0 | — | | — | | — | | 32 | 0 |
| Louhans-Cuiseaux | Total | | 66 | 0 | 0 | 0 | — | | — | | — | | 66 | 0 |
| Lens | 1992–93 | Division 1 | 38 | 0 | 3 | 0 | — | | — | | — | | 31 | 0 |
| Lens | 1993–94 | Division 1 | 38 | 0 | 5 | 0 | — | | — | | — | | 43 | 0 |
| Lens | 1994–95 | Division 1 | 38 | 0 | 2 | 0 | — | | — | | — | | 40 | 0 |
| Lens | 1995–96 | Division 1 | 36 | 0 | 1 | 0 | 1 | 0 | 6 | 0 | — | | 44 | 0 |
| Lens | 1996–97 | Division 1 | 17 | 0 | 2 | 0 | 3 | 0 | — | | — | | 22 | 0 |
| Lens | 1997–98 | Division 1 | 34 | 0 | 4 | 0 | 4 | 0 | — | | — | | 42 | 0 |
| Lens | 1998–99 | Division 1 | 34 | 0 | 3 | 0 | 5 | 0 | 6 | 0 | 1 | 0 | 49 | 0 |
| Lens | 1999–2000 | Division 1 | 32 | 0 | 1 | 0 | 1 | 0 | 12 | 0 | — | | 46 | 0 |
| Lens | 2000–01 | Division 1 | 34 | 0 | 1 | 0 | 2 | 0 | 1 | 0 | — | | 38 | 0 |
| Lens | 2001–02 | Division 1 | 34 | 0 | 2 | 0 | 1 | 0 | — | | — | | 37 | 0 |
| Lens | 2002–03 | Ligue 1 | 16 | 0 | — | | — | | 7 | 0 | — | | 23 | 0 |
| Lens | Total | | 351 | 0 | 24 | 0 | 17 | 0 | 32 | 0 | 1 | 0 | 425 | 0 |
| Borussia Dortmund | 2003–04 | Bundesliga | 17 | 0 | — | | — | | — | | — | | 17 | 0 |
| Borussia Dortmund | 2004–05 | Bundesliga | 8 | 0 | 2 | 0 | — | | 2 | 0 | — | | 12 | 0 |
| Borussia Dortmund | Total | | 25 | 0 | 2 | 0 | — | | 2 | 0 | — | | 29 | 0 |
| Borussia Dortmund II | 2003–04 | Regionalliga Nord | 4 | 0 | — | | — | | — | | — | | 4 | 0 |
| Monaco | 2005–06 | Ligue 1 | 23 | 0 | 2 | 0 | 4 | 0 | 8 | 0 | — | | 37 | 0 |
| Career total | | | 469 | 0 | 28 | 0 | 21 | 0 | 42 | 0 | 1 | 0 | 561 | 0 |

== Honours ==
Lens

- French Division 1: 1997–98
- Coupe de la Ligue: 1998–99
