= Jan Koller =

Czech footballer (born 1973)

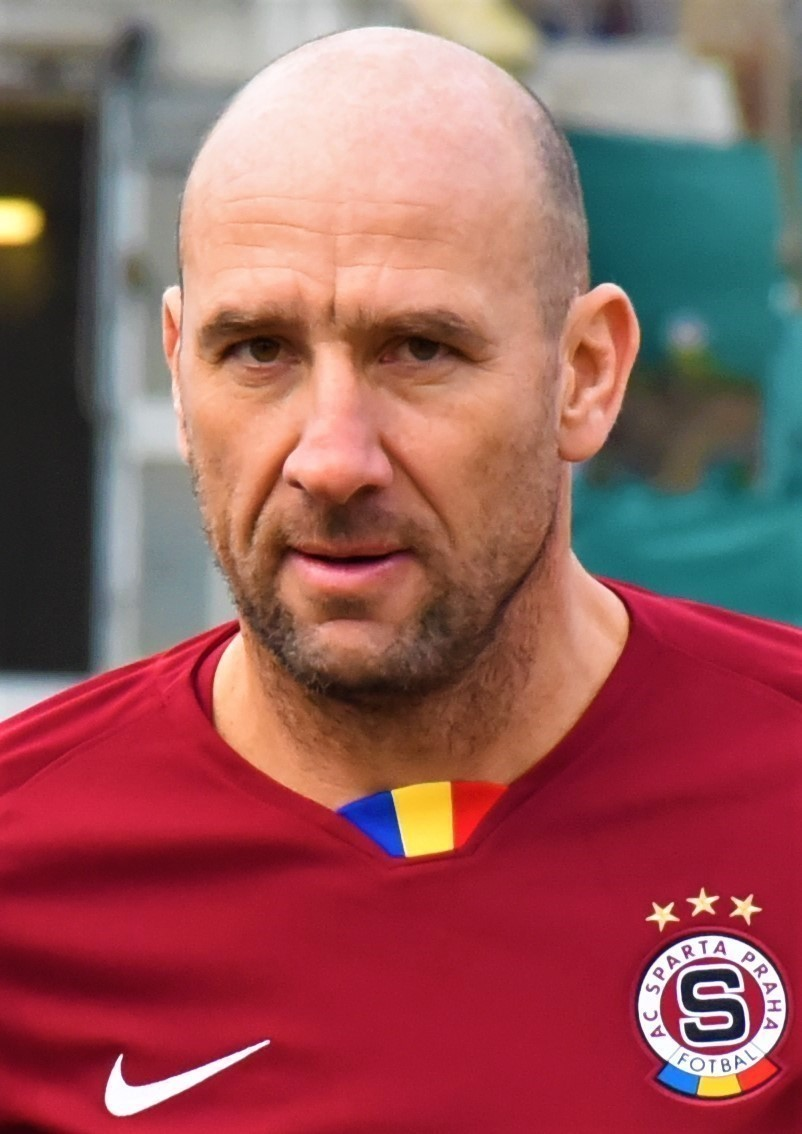
- Koller in a charity match, December 2019

Personal information
- Full name: Jan Koller
- Date of birth: 30 March 1973 (age 53)
- Place of birth: Prague, Czechoslovakia
- Height: 2.02 m (6 ft 8 in)
- Position: Striker

Youth career
- 1978–1989: TJ Smetanova Lhota
- 1989–1994: ZVVZ Milevsko

Senior career*
Years	Team	Apps	(Gls)
1994–1996	Sparta Prague	29	(5)
1996–1999	Lokeren	97	(43)
1999–2001	Anderlecht	65	(42)
2001–2006	Borussia Dortmund	138	(59)
2006–2008	Monaco	50	(12)
2008	1. FC Nürnberg	14	(2)
2008–2009	Krylia Sovetov	46	(16)
2009–2011	Cannes	44	(20)
Total		483	(199)

International career
1995–1996	Czech Republic U21	3	(1)
1999–2009	Czech Republic	91	(55)
Medal record
Men's football
Representing Czech Republic
UEFA European Championship
Bronze medal – third place	2004 Portugal
- * Club domestic league appearances and goals

Jan Koller (Czech pronunciation: [ˈjan ˈkolɛr]; born 30 March 1973) is a Czech former professional footballer who played as a striker. He was noted for his height, strong physique and heading ability.

He began his career at Sparta Prague, then moved to Belgium, where he became the Belgian First Division top scorer with Lokeren. He won the league championship twice with Anderlecht and the Belgian Golden Shoe. In 2001, he joined Borussia Dortmund, where he won the Bundesliga title in his first season and scored 73 goals in 167 official games over five campaigns. He moved frequently in his later career, with stops in France, Germany and Russia.

Koller is the all-time top scorer for the Czech Republic national team, with 55 goals in 91 appearances in a decade-long career starting in 1999. He represented the nation at three UEFA European Championships and the 2006 FIFA World Cup.

== Club career ==
=== Early career ===
Koller started his football training as a goalkeeper, but was converted to striker by the time he started his professional career with Czech club Sparta Prague. He made his début for Sparta in the spring of 1995 in a match against Benešov, coming on as a substitute with 20 minutes of the game remaining. In 1996, Koller caught the eye of Belgian football and signed with the club Lokeren for a fee equivalent to €102,000.

=== Anderlecht ===
After a successful three-year stint, in which he managed to finish as Belgian First Division top-scorer in his last season at Lokeren, Koller was signed by Belgian club Anderlecht. He quickly built up a successful partnership with Canadian striker Tomasz Radzinski, excelling in his debut season and earning him the Belgian Golden Shoe in 2000. At the end of the season, he was bought by German side Borussia Dortmund after turning down English side Fulham.

=== Borussia Dortmund ===
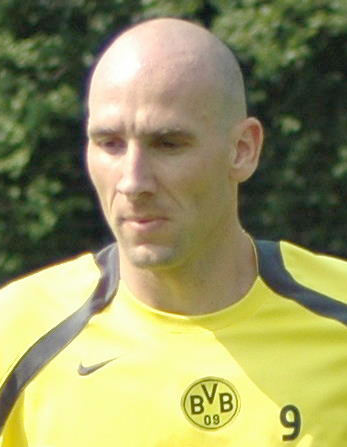
Koller with Borussia Dortmund in 2006

While Koller was at Dortmund, the club won the 2001–02 Bundesliga, thanks in part to Koller's 11 league goals. Besides the Bundesliga title his biggest success whilst at Dortmund was helping them to the 2002 UEFA Cup Final, where his goal could not prevent them losing 3–2 to Feyenoord.

His training as a goalkeeper saw some use in the 2002–03 season. In a Bundesliga match against Bayern Munich, Dortmund's goalkeeper Jens Lehmann was sent off in the second half for a second yellow card, and Dortmund had already used their three substitutions. Koller, who had already opened the scoring in the 8th minute, moved from striker to goalkeeper after 67 minutes of the match. He prevented any more goals for the rest of the match, despite Dortmund having been reduced to nine players due to the earlier expulsion of Torsten Frings. Koller was named by kicker as the Bundesliga's top goalkeeper of the week for his performance.

=== Monaco and Nürnberg ===
In a surprising move, Koller signed with French side Monaco in 2006 but a two-season disappointing campaign, despite a decent scoring record, forced him to move back to Germany to play with 1. FC Nürnberg. Unfortunately for Koller, who wasn't the only Czech in the team as he was partnered with Tomáš Galásek and Jaromír Blazek, the Nürnberg-based club had performed poorly throughout the season and were relegated to 2. Bundesliga at the end of the 2007–08 season. In 14 matches Bundesliga matches he netted twice for Nürnberg.

=== Later career ===
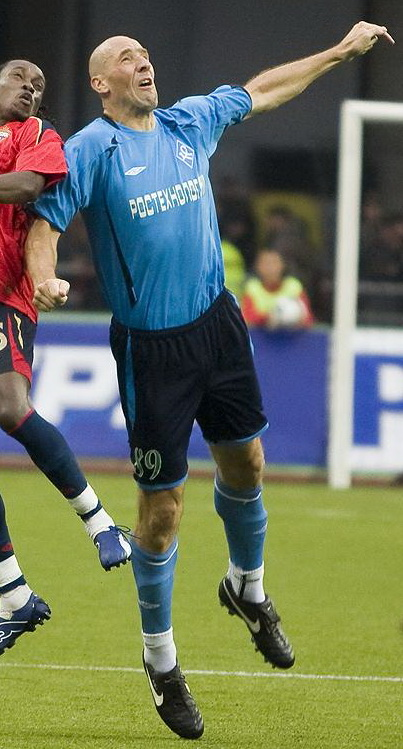
Koller playing for Krylia Sovetov in 2009

On 23 June 2008, Koller was transferred to Russian club Krylia Sovetov Samara in a deal worth €1 million. On 5 December 2009, Koller returned to France, joining Championnat National team Cannes, with a contract until June 2011. Koller announced his retirement from football in August 2011 after a series of injuries.

== International career ==
Koller made his debut for the Czech Republic in a friendly away to Belgium at the King Baudouin Stadium in Brussels on 9 February 1999, and netted the only goal of the game in the 73rd minute.

Koller became the all-time top scorer for the Czech Republic on 8 June 2005 following a match against Macedonia, in which he scored four goals in just 11 minutes of a 6–1 win, taking his international total to 39.

In his third month with Nürnberg, Koller announced that he would retire from the Czech national team after Euro 2008. However, after losing a Euro 2008 Group A match against Turkey 3–2, Koller eventually retired from international football.

In July 2009, Koller announced that he would rejoin the national team because of poor results in the 2010 World Cup qualification. He played in the match against Slovakia, but announced his retirement from international football again on 6 September.

== Style of play ==
Koller was particularly noted for his height, strong physique and heading ability, being referred to as a "towering forward" and a "human lighthouse". Due to his stature, he was often nicknamed Dino throughout his career.

== Career statistics ==
=== Club ===
Appearances and goals by club, season and competition
Club	Season	League			National cup		League cup		Continental		Total		Ref.
Club	Season	Division	Apps	Goals	Apps	Goals	Apps	Goals	Apps	Goals	Apps	Goals	Ref.
Sparta Prague	1994–95	Czech First League	6	1	0	0	—		—		6	1	
Sparta Prague	1995–96	Czech First League	23	4	0	0	—		7	1	30	5	
Sparta Prague	Total		29	5	0	0	0	0	7	1	36	6	–
Lokeren	1996–97	Belgian First Division	31	8	—		—		—		31	8	
Lokeren	1997–98	Belgian First Division	33	11	—		—		—		33	11	
Lokeren	1998–99	Belgian First Division	33	24	5	3	—		—		38	27	
Lokeren	Total		97	43	5	3	0	0	0	0	102	46	–
Anderlecht	1999–2000	Belgian First Division	33	20	12	10	—		4	3	49	33	
Anderlecht	2000–01	Belgian First Division	32	22	5	2	—		16	7	53	31	
Anderlecht	Total		65	42	17	12	0	0	20	10	102	64	–
Borussia Dortmund	2001–02	Bundesliga	33	11	1	0	1	0	14	6	49	17	
Borussia Dortmund	2002–03	Bundesliga	34	13	1	1	1	0	12	8	48	22	
Borussia Dortmund	2003–04	Bundesliga	32	16	2	1	3	2	5	0	42	19	
Borussia Dortmund	2004–05	Bundesliga	30	15	3	1	0	0	—		33	16	
Borussia Dortmund	2005–06	Bundesliga	9	4	1	1	0	0	2	0	12	5	
Borussia Dortmund	Total		138	59	8	4	5	2	31	14	182	79	–
Monaco	2006–07	Ligue 1	32	8	1	0	2	0	—		35	8	
Monaco	2007–08	Ligue 1	18	4	0	0	1	0	—		19	4	
Monaco	Total		50	12	1	0	3	0	0	0	54	12	–
1. FC Nürnberg	2007–08	Bundesliga	14	2	0	0	0	0	2	0	16	2	
Krylia Sovetov Samara	2008	Russian Premier League	18	7			—		—		18	7	
Krylia Sovetov Samara	2009	Russian Premier League	28	9			—		—		28	9	
Krylia Sovetov Samara	Total		46	16			0	0	0	0	46	16	–
Cannes	2009–10	Championnat National	15	4	0	0	—		—		15	4	
Cannes	2010–11	Championnat National	29	16	2	0	—		—		31	16	
Cannes	Total		44	20	2	0	0	0	0	0	46	20	–
Career total			483	199	33	19	8	2	62	25	586	245	–

=== International ===
Appearances and goals by national team and year
National team	Year	Apps	Goals
Czech Republic	1999	10	9
Czech Republic	2000	11	6
Czech Republic	2001	7	0
Czech Republic	2002	9	5
Czech Republic	2003	9	7
Czech Republic	2004	14	6
Czech Republic	2005	6	7
Czech Republic	2006	8	7
Czech Republic	2007	9	4
Czech Republic	2008	7	4
Czech Republic	2009	1	0
Czech Republic	Total	91	55

== Honours ==
Sparta Prague

- Czech First League: 1994–95
- Czech Cup: 1995–96

Anderlecht

- Belgian First Division: 1999–2000, 2000–01
- Belgian Supercup: 2000

Borussia Dortmund

- Bundesliga: 2001–02

Individual

- Belgian Pro League top scorer: 1998–99
- Czech Footballer of the Year: 1999
- Belgian Golden Shoe: 2000

== See also ==
- List of men's footballers with 50 or more international goals
