= Márcio Amoroso =

Brazilian footballer (born 1974)

Personal information
- Full name: Márcio Amoroso dos Santos
- Date of birth: 5 July 1974 (age 52)
- Place of birth: Brasília, Brazil
- Height: 1.80 m (5 ft 11 in)
- Position: Forward

Youth career
- 1988–1992: Guarani

Senior career*
Years	Team	Apps	(Gls)
1992–1996	Guarani	39	(28)
1992–1993	→ Verdy Kawasaki (loan)	0	(0)
1996	→ Flamengo (loan)	16	(6)
1996–1999	Udinese	86	(39)
1999–2001	Parma	39	(11)
2001–2004	Borussia Dortmund	59	(28)
2004–2005	Málaga	29	(5)
2005	São Paulo	22	(12)
2006	Milan	4	(1)
2006–2007	Corinthians	12	(2)
2007	Grêmio	6	(0)
2008	Aris	9	(1)
2009–2010	Guarani	0	(0)
2016	Boca Raton	3	(0)
Total		324	(133)

International career
1995–2003	Brazil	19	(9)
Medal record
Representing Brazil
Copa América
Winner	1999 Paraguay
- * Club domestic league appearances and goals

Márcio Amoroso dos Santos (born 5 July 1974) is a Brazilian football pundit and former professional player who mainly played as a forward. He played for several teams in his home country as well as in Japan, Italy, Germany, Spain and Greece while also representing Brazil at international level, winning the 1999 Copa América.

== Club career ==
Amoroso started his career at homeland club Guarani FC at 1992. In July 1992, he was loaned to a Japanese outfit Verdy Kawasaki (J.League Division 1), winning two J-League titles, and returned to Guarani FC two years later, finishing the 1994 Campeonato Brasileiro Série A as the season's top scorer. In 1996, he transferred to Flamengo, but he came to prominence playing in the Italian Serie A for unfashionable Udinese in the late-1990s. There he starred alongside Oliver Bierhoff in a side which played an adventurous 3–4–3 formation, finishing his first season with the club in third place in Serie A. When the league's top scorer Oliver Bierhoff left the club for AC Milan in 1998, many thought Udinese Calcio would struggle to repeat their success, but that very next season Amoroso himself became the focus of the team, and was the top scorer in Serie A with 22 goals. The following season, he transferred to the defending UEFA Cup and Coppa Italia champions Parma for an astounding €30 million. Although the team started the season strongly, winning the 1999 Supercoppa Italiana, Parma never quite fulfilled their potential to win the league title, and Amoroso was not able to match the form he managed with Udinese due to recurring injury problems; the club did manage to reach the 2001 Coppa Italia final, however.

After two seasons, Amoroso was soon on the move again, this time to Borussia Dortmund in Germany, for 50 million Deutsche Mark (€25 million), (Note: Parma listed the revenue was 55,439,944,000 lire, took DM 1.95583 = €1 and €1 = 1936.27 lire and took 6 significant figure got DM 1 = 989.999 lire. Thus the fee was 56,000,000 Deutsche Mark) a German record at that time. Amoroso won the Bundesliga title during the 2001–02 season, and was also the league's top scorer. He helped the club to the 2002 UEFA Cup final, where his goal (a penalty) could not prevent the team from losing 3–2 to Feyenoord. During his next two seasons with the club, his appearances were more limited however, due to recurring injury problems. Amoroso played for Málaga during the 2004–05 season, although he was mainly used as a substitute, scoring only 5 goals in 29 appearances, as Málaga finished the season in 10th place in the league.

Amoroso moved to São Paulo in the summer of 2005 and immediately helped them to the Copa Libertadores, the most prestigious club prize in South America. In January 2006, after having won the FIFA Club World Championship, finishing the tournament as top scorer, he returned to Italy, signing an 18-month contract for AC Milan as a replacement for Christian Vieri, who had transferred to Monaco.

After an unsuccessful spell, Amoroso agreed to cancel his contract with AC Milan on 1 September 2006, and immediately signed a new contract with Corinthians. Amoroso quickly received the no. 10 jersey from Corinthians as a replacement for Carlos Tevez (who left SC Corinthians Paulista and moved to West Ham United). But there he could not show the football that he was capable of, having his contract resigned in April 2007, signing in for Grêmio. Since August, Amoroso did not play for Grêmio, having his contract resigned due to lack of form. In January 2008, he signed a one-and-a-half-year contract with Aris Thessaloniki. However, he spent only six months in Thessaloniki. On 29 December 2008, Amoroso returned to Guarani for the 2009 season. He retired at the end of the season, at the age of 34, due to injury struggles, despite not making an appearance for the club that year.

== International career ==
Amoroso scored 9 goals in 19 appearances for Brazil between 1995 and 2003. He made his debut in a 5–0 win over Chile, and was later a member of the squad that won the 1999 Copa América.

== Style of play ==
A talented striker with great dribbling skills and goalscoring ability, Amoroso was also capable of creating chances for teammates. During his breakthrough with Guarani, he was used behind centre-forward Luizão, operating as a link between midfield and attack. Mário Zagallo described him as a player who could set up play like a number 10 and finish like a number nine, while Tim Vickery characterised his early style as intelligent and explosive.

== Individual ==
Aris Thessaloniki was Amoroso's 12th club in six countries. He won 20 trophies and personal awards, including the Copa América with Brazil and both the FIFA Club World Championship and Copa Libertadores with São Paulo. He has also played for Verdy Kawasaki, Flamengo, Udinese, Parma, Borussia Dortmund, Málaga, Milan, Corinthians, Grêmio and Guarani which was his last club.

Amoroso was the top scorer in three national championships, and broke the Bundesliga transfer record when he moved to Borussia Dortmund from Parma in the middle of 2001.

== Personal life ==
Amoroso is of Italian descent through his mother. He is the nephew of the footballer José Amoroso Filho.

== Career statistics ==
=== Club ===
Appearances and goals by club, season and competition
Club	Season	League			National Cup		League Cup		Continental		Other		Total	
Club	Season	Division	Apps	Goals	Apps	Goals	Apps	Goals	Apps	Goals	Apps	Goals	Apps	Goals
Guarani	1992	Série A	0	0	—		—		—		—		—	
Guarani	1994	Série A	26	19	—		—		—		—		26	19
Guarani	1995	Série A	13	9	—		—		—		—		13	9
Guarani	Total		39	28	—		—		—		—		39	28
Verdy Kawasaki (loan)	1992	J1 League	—		0	0	0	0	0	0	—		0	0
Verdy Kawasaki (loan)	1993	J1 League	0	0	0	0	0	0	0	0	—		0	0
Verdy Kawasaki (loan)	Total		0	0	0	0	0	0	0	0	—		0	0
Flamengo (loan)	1996	Série A	16	6	—		—		—		—		16	6
Udinese	1996–97	Serie A	28	12	1	0	—		—		—		29	12
Udinese	1997–98	Serie A	25	5	4	1	—		4 (Note: Appearances in UEFA Cup)	0	—		33	6
Udinese	1998–99	Serie A	33	22	6	2	—		2	0	—		41	24
Udinese	Total		86	39	11	3	—		6	0	—		103	42
Parma	1999–2000	Serie A	16	4	0	0	—		1	0	—		17	4
Parma	2000–01	Serie A	23	7	6	4	—		5	3	—		34	14
Parma	Total		39	11	6	4	—		6	3	—		51	18
Borussia Dortmund	2001–02	Bundesliga	31	18	1	0	1	0	13 (Note: Five appearances and three goals in UEFA Champions League, eight appearances and five goals in UEFA Cup)	8	—		46	26
Borussia Dortmund	2002–03	Bundesliga	24	6	2	0	0	0	9 (Note: Appearances in UEFA Champions League)	3	—		35	9
Borussia Dortmund	2003–04	Bundesliga	4	4	0	0	3	2	2	2	—		9	8
Borussia Dortmund	Total		59	28	3	0	4	2	24	13	—		90	43
Málaga	2004–05	La Liga	29	5	0	0	—		—		—		29	5
São Paulo	2005	Série A	22	12	—		—		5 (Note: Appearances in Copa Libertadores)	2	2 (Note: Appearances in FIFA Club World Cup)	2	29	16
Milan	2005–06	Serie A	4	1	1	0	—		0	0	—		5	1
Corinthians	2006	Série A	12	2	—		—		—		—		12	2
Grêmio	2007	Série A	6	0	—		—		—		—		6	0
Aris	2007–08	Super League Greece	9	1	0	0	—		0	0	—		9	1
Guarani	2009	Série B	0	0	—		—		—		—		0	0
Guarani	2010	Série A	0	0	—		—		—		—		0	0
Guarani	Total		0	0	—		—		—		—		0	0
Boca Raton	2016	USASA	3	0	0	0	—		—		—		3	0
Career total			324	133	21	7	4	2	41	18	2	2	392	162

=== International ===
Appearances and goals by national team and year
National team	Year	Apps	Goals
Brazil	1995	1	0
Brazil	1996	0	0
Brazil	1997	0	0
Brazil	1998	1	2
Brazil	1999	10	7
Brazil	2000	3	0
Brazil	2001	0	0
Brazil	2002	1	0
Brazil	2003	3	0
Total		19	9

Scores and results list Brazil's goal tally first, score column indicates score after each Amoroso goal.

List of international goals scored by Márcio Amoroso
No.	Date	Venue	Opponent	Score	Result	Competition	Ref.
1	18 November 1998	Castelão, Fortaleza, Brazil	Russia	2–0	5–1	Friendly	
2	18 November 1998	Castelão, Fortaleza, Brazil	Russia	5–1	5–1	Friendly	
3	31 March 1999	National Stadium, Tokyo, Japan	Japan	1–0	2–0	Friendly	
4	5 June 1999	Arena Fonte Nova, Salvador, Brazil	Netherlands	1–0	2–2	Friendly	
5	8 June 1999	Estádio Serra Dourada, Goiânia, Brazil	Netherlands	1–0	3–1	Friendly	
6	30 June 1999	Estadio Antonio Aranda, Ciudad del Este, Paraguay	Venezuela	3–0	7–0	1999 Copa America	
7	30 June 1999	Estadio Antonio Aranda, Ciudad del Este, Paraguay	Venezuela	6–0	7–0	1999 Copa America	
8	3 July 1999	Estadio Antonio Aranda, Ciudad del Este, Paraguay	Mexico	1–0	2–1	1999 Copa America	
9	14 July 1999	Estadio Antonio Aranda, Ciudad del Este, Paraguay	Mexico	1–0	2–0	1999 Copa America	

== Honours ==
Verdy Kawasaki

- J.League Division 1: 1993

Flamengo

- Campeonato Carioca: 1996
- Copa de Oro: 1996

Parma

- Supercoppa Italiana: 1999
- Coppa Italia runner-up: 2001

Borussia Dortmund

- Bundesliga: 2001–02
- UEFA Cup runner-up: 2001–02

São Paulo

- Copa Libertadores: 2005
- FIFA Club World Championship: 2005

Boca Raton FC

- American Premier Soccer League: 2016

Brazil

- Copa América: 1999

Individual

- Bola de Ouro: 1994
- Bola de Prata: 1994
- Campeonato Brasileiro Série A top scorer: 1994
- Serie A top scorer: 1998–99
- Bundesliga top scorer: 2001–02
- Toyota Award: 2005
- FIFA Club World Championship top scorer: 2005
