= Sebastian Kehl =

German football player and executive (born 1980)

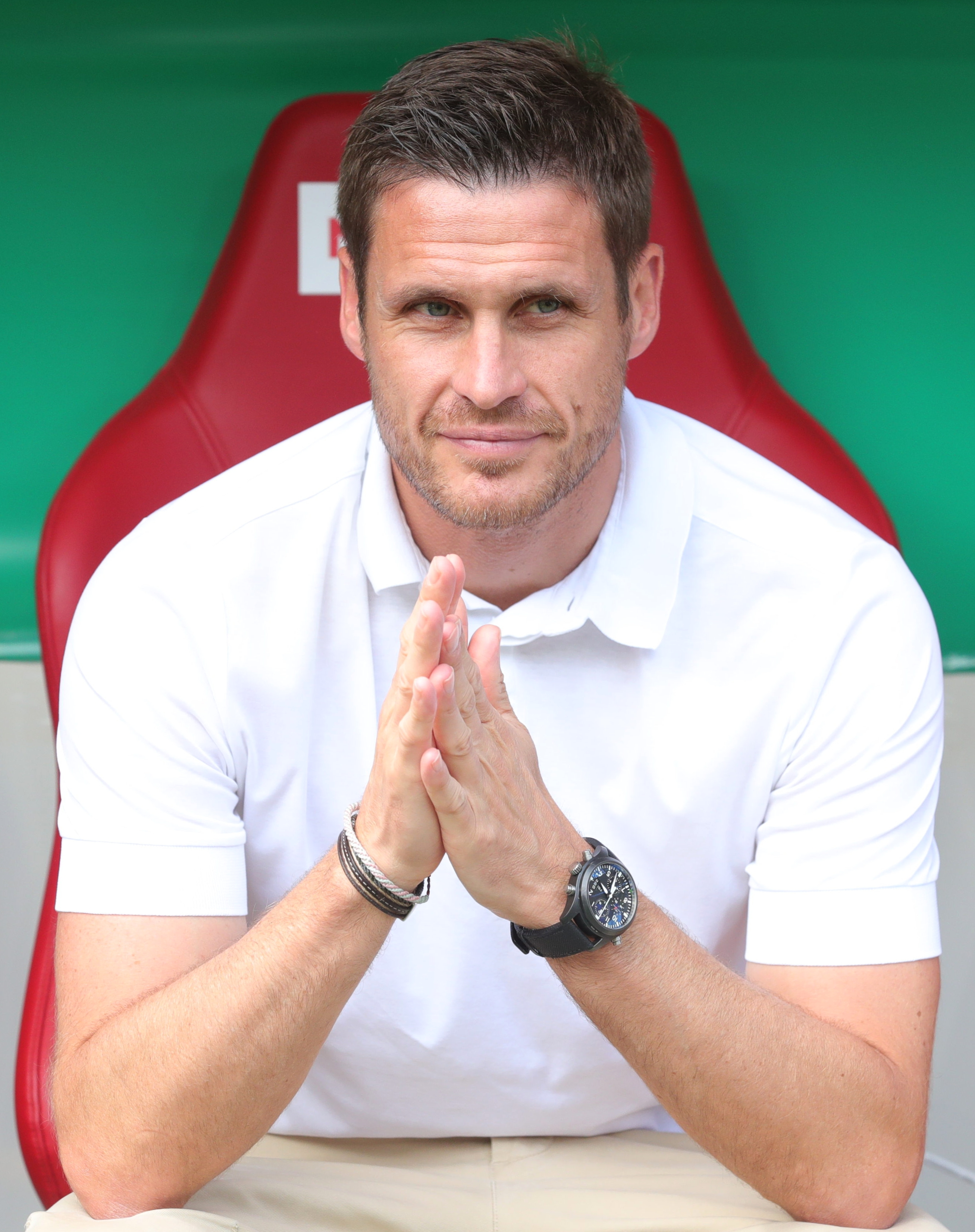
- Kehl in 2023

Personal information
- Full name: Sebastian Walter Kehl
- Date of birth: 13 February 1980 (age 46)
- Place of birth: Fulda, West Germany
- Height: 1.88 m (6 ft 2 in)
- Position: Defensive midfielder

Youth career
- 1985–1994: SV Lahrbach
- 1994–1996: Borussia Fulda
- 1996–1998: Hannover 96

Senior career*
Years	Team	Apps	(Gls)
1998–2000	Hannover 96	32	(2)
2000–2001	SC Freiburg	40	(4)
2002–2015	Borussia Dortmund	274	(20)
2004–2011	Borussia Dortmund II (res.)	7	(1)
Total		353	(27)

International career
1996–1999	Germany U18	19	(3)
1998	Germany U19	1	(0)
1999–2001	Germany U21	11	(0)
2001–2006	Germany	31	(2)
Medal record
Representing Germany
FIFA World Cup
Runner-up	2002 Korea/Japan
Third place	2006 Germany
FIFA Confederations Cup
Third place	2005 Germany
- * Club domestic league appearances and goals

Sebastian Walter Kehl (German pronunciation: [zeˈbasti̯a(ː)n ˈkeːl]; born 13 February 1980) is a German football executive and former professional player.

A defensive midfielder, Kehl amassed Bundesliga totals of 314 games and 24 goals over the course of 15 seasons, mainly representing Borussia Dortmund. He won six major titles with the club, including three national championships.

Kehl was a German international for five years and appeared in two World Cups (finishing second in the 2002 edition) and in the Euro 2004. Following his retirement, he first worked as the "Head of First Team Football" for Borussia Dortmund before taking over as sporting director, a position he held until March 2026.

== Club career ==
Born in Fulda, Hesse, Kehl joined Hannover 96's youth system in 1996 at the age of 15, going on to appear in two 2. Bundesliga seasons with the first team. In the 2000 summer he signed for SC Freiburg in the Bundesliga, making his debut in the competition on 12 August by playing the full 90 minutes in a 4–0 home win against VfB Stuttgart, and scoring his first goal on 12 December of that year to help to a 2–1 away success over VfL Wolfsburg.

Under manager Volker Finke, Kehl featured mostly as a sweeper, helping the Black Forest club qualify to the 2001–02 UEFA Cup in his first season, before the club suffered relegation in his second season. He was no longer part of the squad, however, as he had left in the 2002 January transfer window to Borussia Dortmund, who went on to win the championship with 15 games and one goal from the player. Previously, in summer 2001, he controversially agreed basic terms with FC Bayern Munich, and even accepted an advanced payment of 1.5 million Deutsche Mark, which was returned in November as Bayern threatened to take legal action.

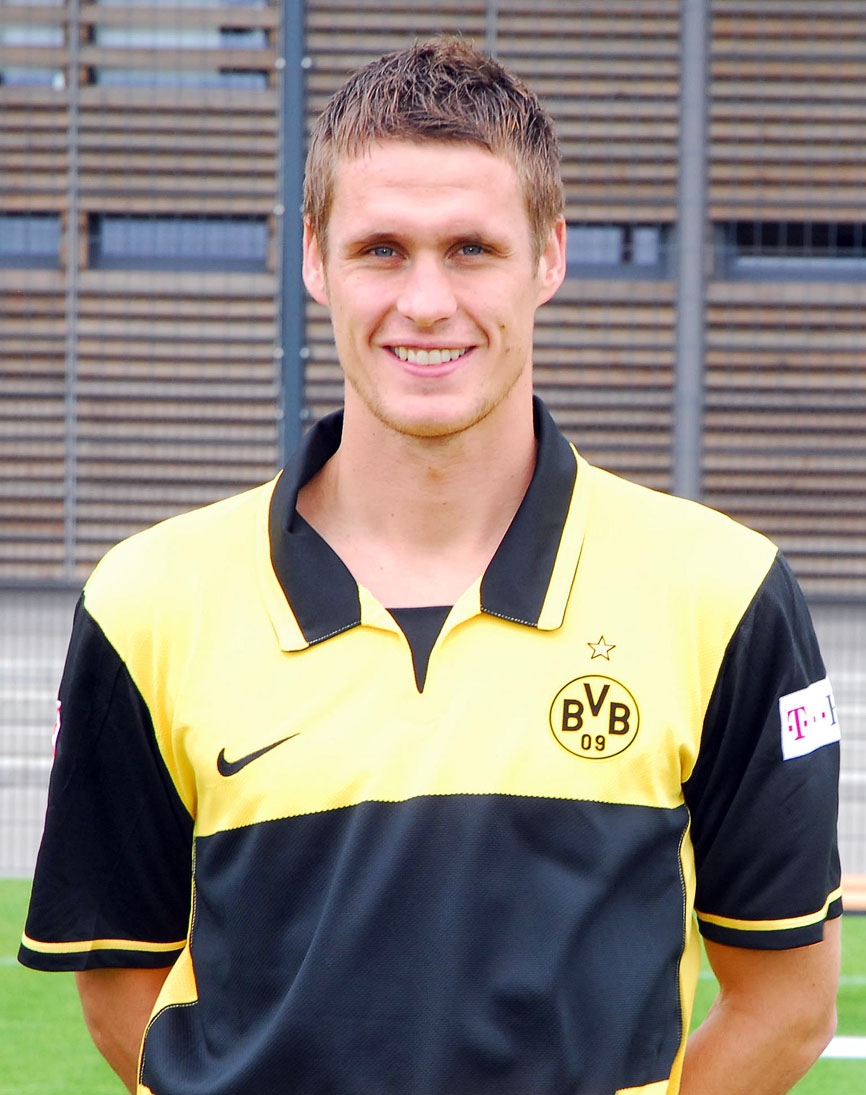
Kehl with Borussia Dortmund in 2007

During his tenure with Dortmund, Kehl was more often than not a starter. He contributed with 12 matches in the 2002–03 UEFA Champions League to help his team reach the second group phase, and amassed 61 league appearances from 2004 to 2006 in back-to-back seventh-place finishes.

On the first day of the 2006–07 campaign, Kehl injured his left knee in a challenge with Bayern's Hasan Salihamidžić, sidelining him for several months and only recovering fully at the start of 2008–09, when he was made captain by new coach Jürgen Klopp. He eventually relapsed on his condition, also losing his importance in the starting XI after the emergence of Sven Bender and Nuri Şahin.

On 27 July 2013, Kehl played the second half of the DFL-Supercup against Bayern Munich, replacing Bender in an eventual 4–2 win. In September, he was put out of action for another lengthy period after injuring his ankle in training.

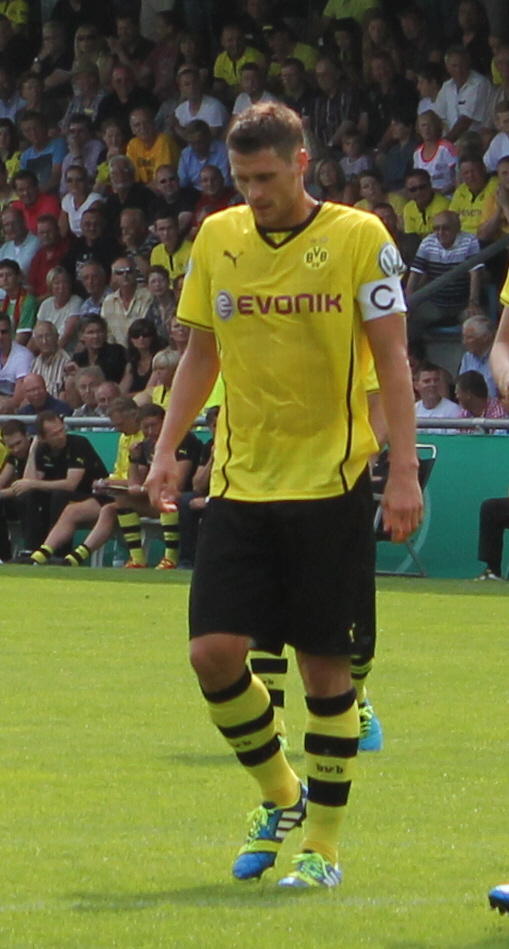
Kehl captaining Dortmund in 2013

Kehl began hinting at retirement in March 2014, shortly after having agreed to a one-year extension to his contract. The 35-year-old confirmed it at the end of the 2014–15 season, after having taken part in 21 games to help Dortmund come from behind in the table and qualify to the 2015–16 UEFA Europa League.

== International career ==
Kehl earned the first of his 31 caps for the Germany national team on 29 May 2001, in a 2–0 friendly win against Slovakia in Bremen where he came on for Marko Rehmer after 45 minutes. He scored his first goal on 15 August of that year, contributing to a 5–2 win over Hungary in another exhibition game.

Selected for both the 2002 and the 2006 World Cups, Kehl played twice (against Paraguay and United States) in the former tournament as the Mannschaft finished in second place, and started in two of his four appearances to help to the third place in the latter.

== Management career ==
In April 2018, Borussia Dortmund announced that Kehl would become its players licence department director starting on 1 June.

In June 2021, Borussia Dortmund announced that Kehl would be the successor to sporting director Michael Zorc following his retirement in the summer of 2022. In March 2026, Borussia Dortmund announced that Kehl would leave the club by mutual consent.

== Personal life ==
Kehl is married to Tina Kehl. They have three children.

== Career statistics ==
=== Club ===
Appearances and goals by club, season and competition
Club	Season	League			DFB-Pokal		Europe		Other (Note: Includes DFL-Supercup and DFL-Ligapokal)		Total	
Club	Season	Division	Apps	Goals	Apps	Goals	Apps	Goals	Apps	Goals	Apps	Goals
Hannover 96	1998–99	2. Bundesliga	8	1	1	0	—		—		9	1
Hannover 96	1999–2000	2. Bundesliga	24	1	2	0	—		—		26	1
Hannover 96	Total		32	2	3	0	0	0	0	0	35	2
SC Freiburg	2000–01	Bundesliga	25	2	2	2	—		—		27	4
SC Freiburg	2001–02	Bundesliga	15	2	2	0	5	2	1	0	23	4
SC Freiburg	Total		40	4	4	2	5	2	1	0	50	8
Borussia Dortmund	2001–02	Bundesliga	15	1	0	0	—		—		15	1
Borussia Dortmund	2002–03	Bundesliga	28	0	2	0	12	0	1	0	43	0
Borussia Dortmund	2003–04	Bundesliga	23	1	1	0	6	0	3	0	33	1
Borussia Dortmund	2004–05	Bundesliga	32	4	3	0	2	0	—		37	4
Borussia Dortmund	2005–06	Bundesliga	29	1	1	0	—		—		30	1
Borussia Dortmund	2006–07	Bundesliga	6	0	0	0	—		—		6	0
Borussia Dortmund	2007–08	Bundesliga	14	3	5	0	—		—		19	3
Borussia Dortmund	2008–09	Bundesliga	28	5	2	0	2	0	—		32	5
Borussia Dortmund	2009–10	Bundesliga	6	1	0	0	—		—		6	1
Borussia Dortmund	2010–11	Bundesliga	6	0	1	0	2	0	—		9	0
Borussia Dortmund	2011–12	Bundesliga	27	3	6	0	5	0	1	0	39	3
Borussia Dortmund	2012–13	Bundesliga	22	0	3	0	9	0	—		34	0
Borussia Dortmund	2013–14	Bundesliga	17	1	4	0	5	1	1	0	27	2
Borussia Dortmund	2014–15	Bundesliga	21	0	6	1	4	0	1	0	32	1
Borussia Dortmund	Total		274	20	34	1	47	1	7	0	362	22
Borussia Dortmund II	2003–04	Regionalliga Nord	1	1	—		—		—		1	1
Borussia Dortmund II	2006–07	Regionalliga Nord	1	0	—		—		—		1	0
Borussia Dortmund II	2007–08	Regionalliga Nord	2	0	—		—		—		2	0
Borussia Dortmund II	2009–10	3. Liga	1	0	—		—		—		1	0
Borussia Dortmund II	2010–11	Regionalliga West	2	0	—		—		—		2	0
Borussia Dortmund II	Total		7	1	0	0	0	0	0	0	7	1
Career total			353	27	41	1	52	3	8	0	454	31

=== International ===
Appearances and goals by national team and year
National team	Year	Apps	Goals
Germany	2001	3	1
Germany	2002	11	0
Germany	2003	7	1
Germany	2004	3	0
Germany	2005	0	0
Germany	2006	7	0
Total		31	2

Scores and results list Germany's goal tally first, score column indicates score after each Kehl goal.

List of international goals scored by Sebastian Kehl
No.	Date	Venue	Opponent	Score	Result	Competition	Ref.
1	15 August 2001	Ferenc Puskás, Budapest, Hungary	Hungary	2–0	5–2	Friendly	
2	30 April 2003	Weserstadion, Bremen, Germany	Serbia and Montenegro	1–0	1–0	Friendly	

== Honours ==
Borussia Dortmund

- Bundesliga: 2001–02, 2010–11, 2011–12
- DFB-Pokal: 2012
- German Supercup: 2008
- DFL-Supercup: 2013, 2014
- UEFA Cup runners-up: 2002
- UEFA Champions League runners-up: 2013

Germany

- FIFA World Cup: 2002 (runners-up); 2006 (third place)
- Bronze at the 2005 FIFA Confederations Cup

Individual

- kicker Bundesliga Team of the Season: 2000–01, 2008–09
