= Roman Weidenfeller =

German footballer (born 1980)

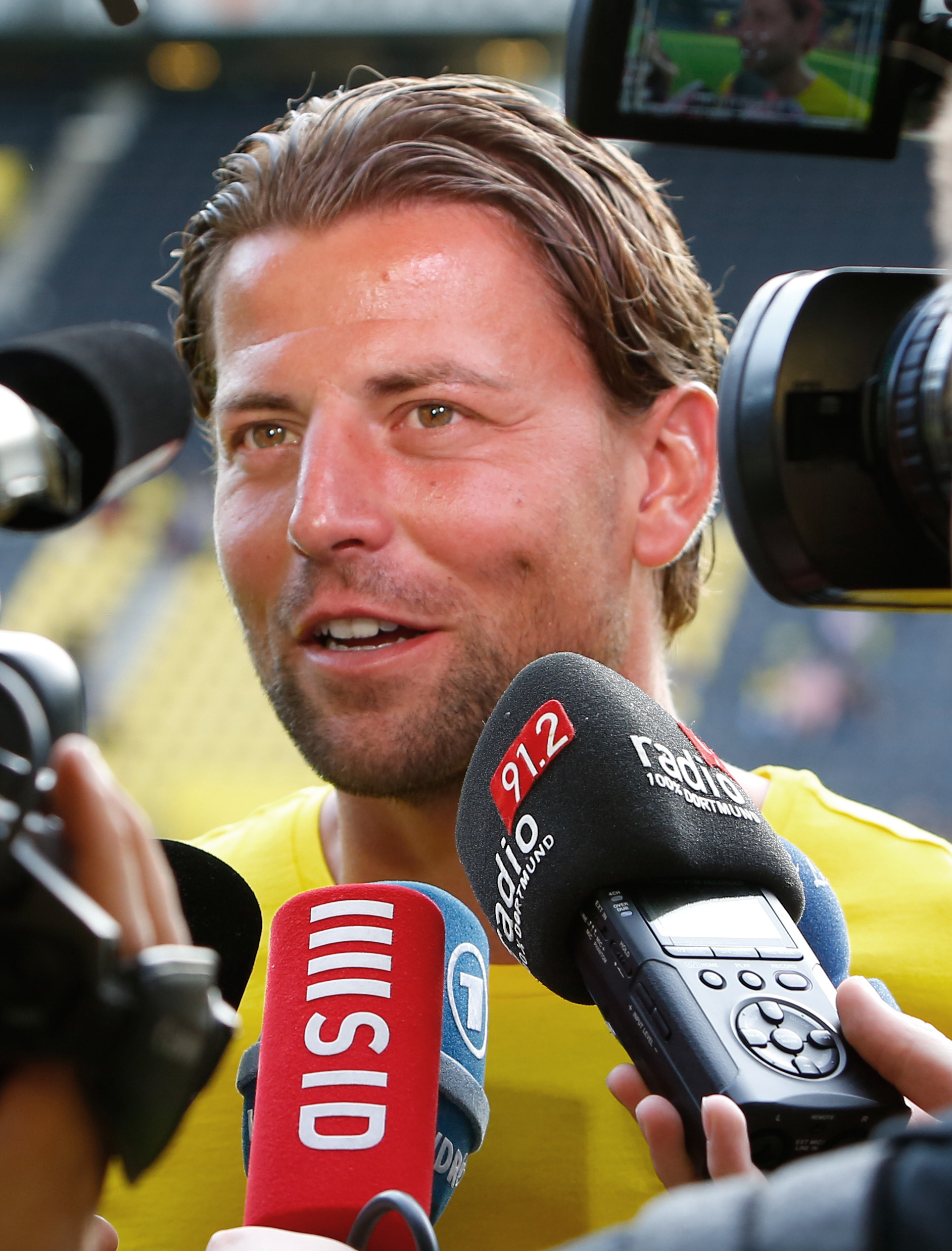
- Weidenfeller with Borussia Dortmund in 2014

Personal information
- Full name: Roman Weidenfeller
- Date of birth: 6 August 1980 (age 46)
- Place of birth: Diez, West Germany
- Height: 1.90 m (6 ft 3 in)
- Position: Goalkeeper

Youth career
- 1985–1996: Sportfreunde Eisbachtal
- 1996–1998: 1. FC Kaiserslautern

Senior career*
Years	Team	Apps	(Gls)
1998–2002	1. FC Kaiserslautern II	51	(0)
1998–2002	1. FC Kaiserslautern	6	(0)
2002–2018	Borussia Dortmund	349	(0)
2002–2018	Borussia Dortmund II	13	(0)
Total		419	(0)

International career
1999–2001	Germany U21	3	(0)
2005	Germany B	1	(0)
2013–2015	Germany	5	(0)
Medal record
Representing Germany
FIFA World Cup
Winner	2014 Brazil
- * Club domestic league appearances and goals

Roman Weidenfeller (born 6 August 1980) is a German former professional footballer who played as a goalkeeper for Bundesliga clubs 1. FC Kaiserslautern and Borussia Dortmund, as well as the Germany national team.

Weidenfeller spent 16 seasons with Dortmund and won both the Bundesliga and DFB-Pokal twice. In 2014, he won the FIFA World Cup with Germany.

== Club career ==
=== Early career ===
During his youth years, Weidenfeller played for Sportfreunde Eisbachtal. He then made his professional debut in 1997, after his performances at the 1997 FIFA U-17 World Championship.

=== 1. FC Kaiserslautern ===
In 1998, Weidenfeller transferred to the 1. FC Kaiserslautern youth team and later was used in the second team. For the 2000–01 season he was promoted to the first team but made only six league appearances in two years.

=== Borussia Dortmund ===
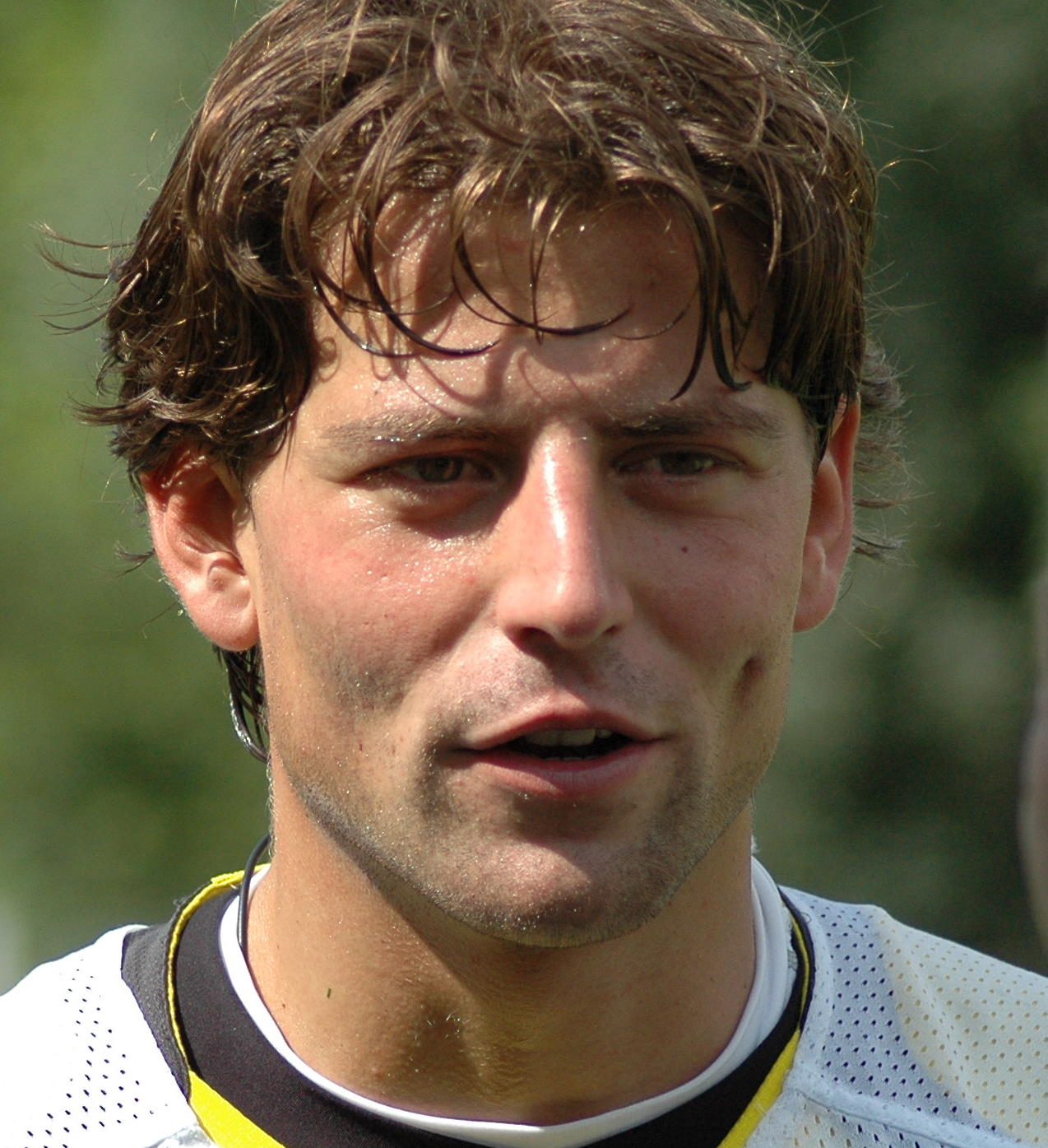
Weidenfeller with Dortmund in 2006

Weidenfeller moved to German champions Borussia Dortmund in 2002 on a free transfer as a possible replacement for Jens Lehmann, who had moved to Arsenal in 2003. Weidenfeller had reportedly been unhappy at Kaiserslautern, where he was used mainly as a backup to Georg Koch. His debut for Dortmund came on 17 December 2003 against his former club, Kaiserslautern, in a 1–0 loss.

In 2005, Weidenfeller underwent surgery following a meniscus tear in his left knee during training.

Early in the 2007–08 season, Weidenfeller was given a three-match ban and fined €10,000 for racist insults leveled against Schalke 04 striker Gerald Asamoah. Asamoah originally reported Weidenfeller after a match on 18 August 2007 between the two clubs, where the incident occurred after a clash between the two in the 51st minute. Weidenfeller offered an apology to Asamoah following the news reports but denied making the statement. Due to a partial tear of the medial ligament in the right knee, he missed the DFB-Pokal final towards the end of the season, which was lost with 2–1 against Bayern Munich. Fellow goalkeeper Marc Ziegler would replace him.

Weidenfeller won the Bundesliga with Dortmund in 2011 and went on to win the Bundesliga and DFB-Pokal double with the club in 2012, saving a penalty taken by Arjen Robben in the Bundesliga-clinching match. In the cup final, he was substituted for Mitchell Langerak in the 33rd minute following a collision with Mario Gómez. His team would beat Bayern Munich with 5–2.

On 6 May 2013, Weidenfeller signed a contract extension with Borussia Dortmund, keeping him at the club until 2016.

On 27 July 2013, Weidenfeller won the 2013 DFL-Supercup with Dortmund 4–2 against rivals Bayern Munich.

However, with manager Jürgen Klopp leaving at the end of the 2014–15 season, the replacement manager Thomas Tuchel chose new signing Roman Bürki as his first-choice goalkeeper as Dortmund began the season in excellent form, winning their first eleven games under Tuchel. Weidenfeller continued to play in the club's European matches.

On 5 February 2016, Weidenfeller signed a new one-year deal with Dortmund, keeping him at the club until 2017. On 9 May 2017, he extended his contract until 2018. At the end of the 2017–18 season, he retired after making his final appearance as a substitute for Bürki, but announced that he would continue to work for Dortmund in another capacity. His farewell match took place on 7 September 2018 in the Signal Iduna Park where Roman & Friends won against the BVB All Stars and Weidenfeller scored two goals.

Following Weidenfeller's retirement, he remained at Borussia Dortmund as an international ambassador.

== International career ==
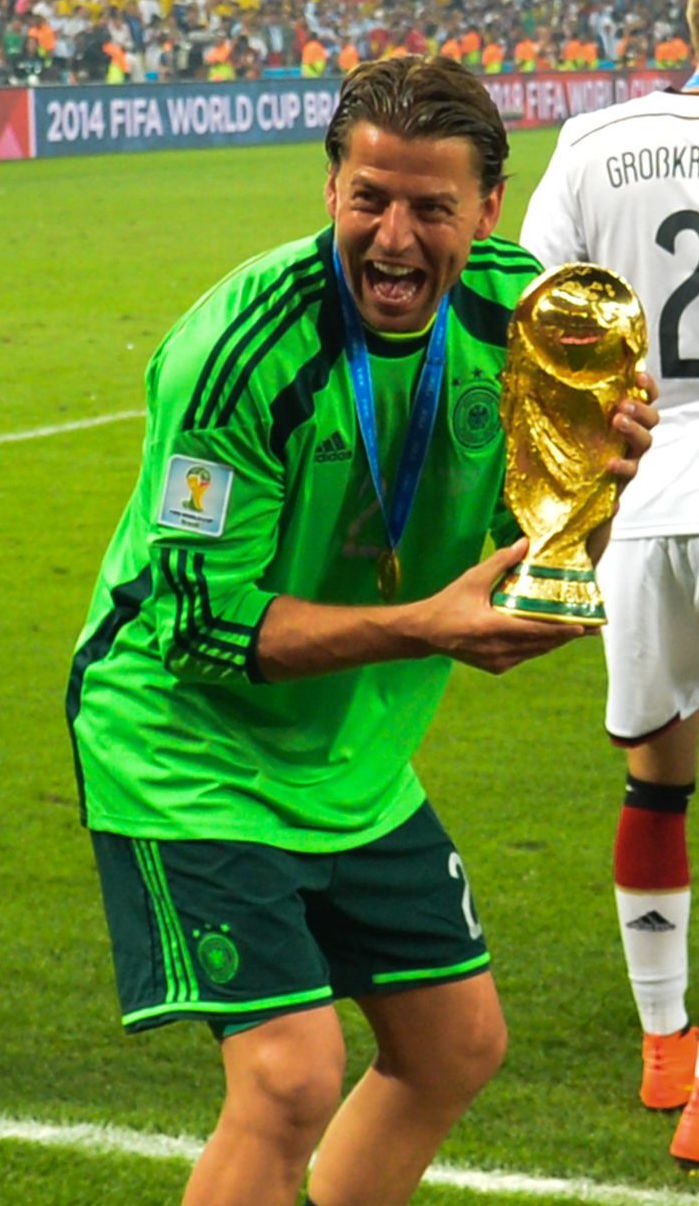
Weidenfeller after Germany's triumph at the 2014 FIFA World Cup

From 1999 until 2001, Roman Weidenfeller competed in three matches for the national under-21 team of Germany.

In 2005, he was part of the B-national team of Germany for which he kept his goal once, also known as Team 2006, as it was the development team for the 2006 FIFA World Cup on homesoil. Nonetheless he would not become part of Jürgen Klinsmann's final World Cup squad.

In November 2013, Weidenfeller was called up to the Germany national squad for his first time for the friendlies against Italy and England. He received his first cap when he started against England at the Wembley Stadium on 19 November 2013, making him the oldest ever German goalkeeping debutant. He then appeared for the game against Cameroon, where the game ended tied at 2–2. He made his third appearance in the next game against Armenia where Germany won 6–1. Both games were international friendlies.

He was nominated as a reserve keeper behind Manuel Neuer for the 2014 FIFA World Cup in Brazil, where the German team won the title a fourth time, but Weidenfeller wasn't used in any match. Weidenfeller made his first appearance in the Germany national team in a competitive match against Gibraltar during the UEFA Euro 2016 qualifying in June 2015. His international farewell came with this match after winning five caps in total.

== Career statistics ==
=== Club ===
Appearances and goals by club, season and competition
Club	Season	League			DFB-Pokal		Europe		Other		Total	
Club	Season	League	Apps	Goals	Apps	Goals	Apps	Goals	Apps	Goals	Apps	Goals
1. FC Kaiserslautern II	1998–99	Regionalliga West/Südwest	4	0	—		—		—		4	0
1. FC Kaiserslautern II	1999–2000	Regionalliga West/Südwest	35	0	—		—		—		35	0
1. FC Kaiserslautern II	2001–02	Regionalliga Süd	12	0	—		—		—		12	0
1. FC Kaiserslautern II	Total		51	0	—		—		—		51	0
1. FC Kaiserslautern	2000–01	Bundesliga	3	0	0	0	1 (Note: Appearance(s) in UEFA Cup)	0	—		4	0
1. FC Kaiserslautern	2001–02	Bundesliga	3	0	1	0	—		—		4	0
1. FC Kaiserslautern	Total		6	0	1	0	1	0	—		8	0
Borussia Dortmund II	2002–03	Regionalliga Nord	7	0	—		—		—		7	0
Borussia Dortmund II	2003–04	Regionalliga Nord	4	0	—		—		—		4	0
Borussia Dortmund II	2004–05	Regionalliga Nord	2	0	—		—		—		2	0
Borussia Dortmund II	Total		13	0	—		—		—		13	0
Borussia Dortmund	2002–03	Bundesliga	11	0	2	0	—		1 (Note: Appearance(s) in DFB-Ligapokal)	0	14	0
Borussia Dortmund	2003–04	Bundesliga	17	0	2	0	6	0	2	0	27	0
Borussia Dortmund	2004–05	Bundesliga	26	0	1	0	—		—		27	0
Borussia Dortmund	2005–06	Bundesliga	24	0	1	0	2	0	—		27	0
Borussia Dortmund	2006–07	Bundesliga	34	0	2	0	—		—		36	0
Borussia Dortmund	2007–08	Bundesliga	14	0	0	0	—		—		14	0
Borussia Dortmund	2008–09	Bundesliga	32	0	3	0	2	0	—		37	0
Borussia Dortmund	2009–10	Bundesliga	30	0	3	0	—		—		33	0
Borussia Dortmund	2010–11	Bundesliga	33	0	2	0	8 (Note: Appearances in UEFA Europa League)	0	—		43	0
Borussia Dortmund	2011–12	Bundesliga	32	0	4	0	6 (Note: Appearances in UEFA Champions League)	0	1 (Note: Appearance in DFL-Supercup)	0	43	0
Borussia Dortmund	2012–13	Bundesliga	31	0	4	0	13	0	1	0	49	0
Borussia Dortmund	2013–14	Bundesliga	30	0	3	0	9	0	1	0	43	0
Borussia Dortmund	2014–15	Bundesliga	25	0	0	0	7	0	—		32	0
Borussia Dortmund	2015–16	Bundesliga	1	0	0	0	13	0	—		14	0
Borussia Dortmund	2016–17	Bundesliga	7	0	2	0	2	0	0	0	11	0
Borussia Dortmund	2017–18	Bundesliga	2	0	0	0	1	0	0	0	3	0
Borussia Dortmund	Total		349	0	29	0	69	0	6	0	453	0
Career total			419	0	30	0	70	0	6	0	525	0

=== International ===
Appearances and goals by national team and year
National team	Year	Apps	Goals
Germany	2013	1	0
Germany	2014	3	0
Germany	2015	1	0
Total		5	0

== Honours ==
Borussia Dortmund

- Bundesliga: 2010–11, 2011–12
- DFB-Pokal: 2012, 2017
- German Supercup: 2008
- DFL-Supercup: 2013
- UEFA Champions League runner-up: 2013

Germany U16

- Bronze at the UEFA European Under-16 Championship 1997

Germany

- FIFA World Cup: 2014

=== Individual ===
- FIFA U-17 World Cup Best Goalkeeper: 1997
- Fußballer des Monats: March 2005, May 2005
- Kicker Goalkeeper of the Year: 2005, 2013
- Kicker highest-rated Bundesliga goalkeeper: 2005, 2006
- Kicker German Football Ranking – World Class: Summer 2013
- UEFA Champions League Squad of the Season:2012–13

=== Orders ===
- Silbernes Lorbeerblatt: 2014
