= Torsten Frings =

German footballer (born 1976)

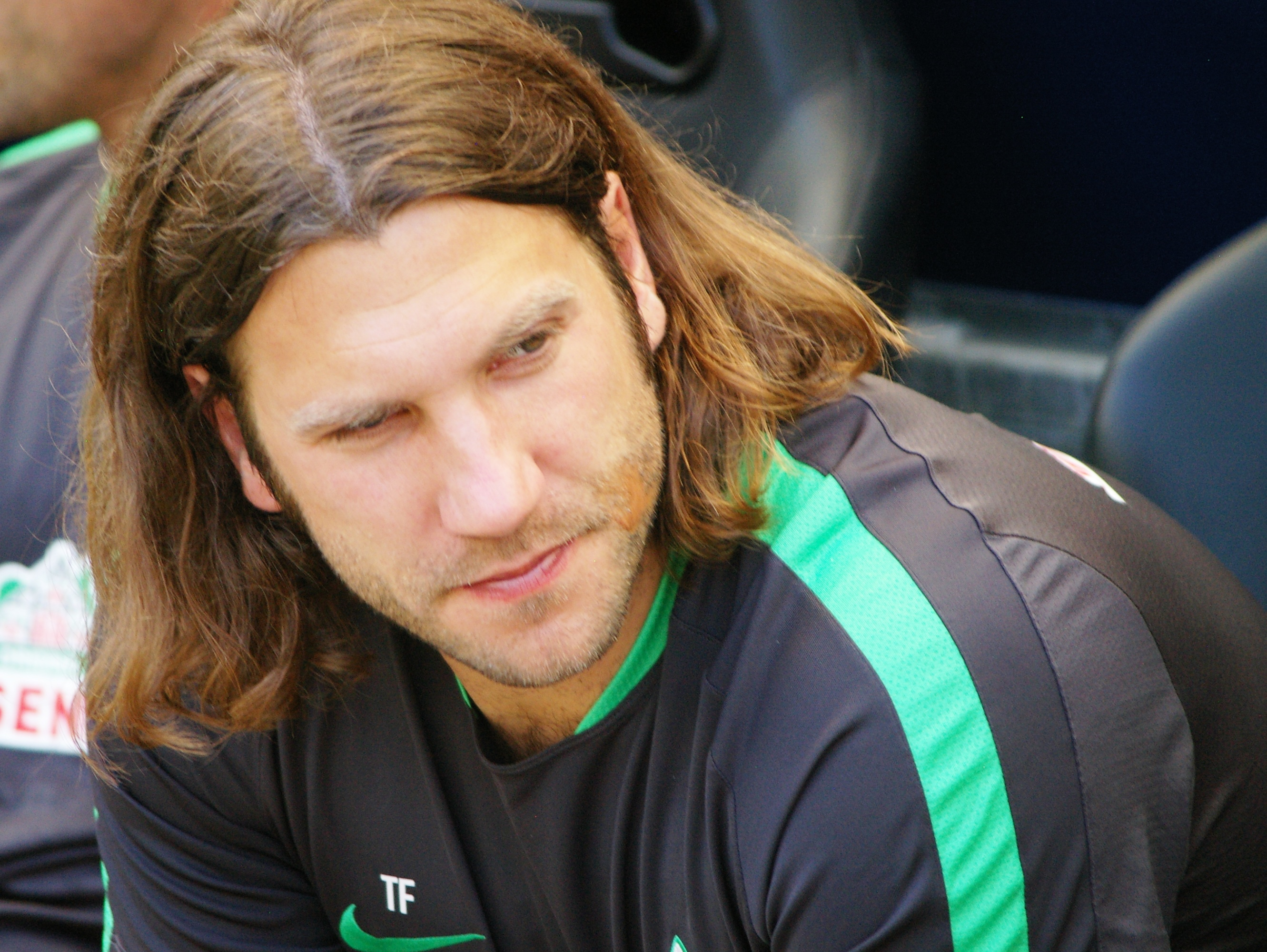
- Frings during his time as Werder Bremen assistant manager

Personal information
- Full name: Torsten Klaus Frings
- Date of birth: 22 November 1976 (age 50)
- Place of birth: Würselen, West Germany
- Height: 1.82 m (6 ft 0 in)
- Position: Central midfielder

Youth career
- 1982–1988: Rot-Weiß Alsdorf
- 1988–1990: Rhenania Alsdorf
- 1990–1994: Alemannia Aachen II

Senior career*
| Years | Team | Apps | (Gls) |
| 1994–1997 | Alemannia Aachen | 57 | (13) |
| 1997 | Werder Bremen (A) | 1 | (1) |
| 1997–2002 | Werder Bremen | 162 | (15) |
| 2002–2004 | Borussia Dortmund | 47 | (10) |
| 2004–2005 | Bayern Munich | 29 | (3) |
| 2005–2011 | Werder Bremen | 164 | (21) |
| 2011–2012 | Toronto FC | 33 | (2) |
| Total | | 493 | (65) |

International career
| 1997–1998 | Germany U21 | 6 | (1) |
| 1999–2000 | Germany B | 5 | (0) |
| 2001–2009 | Germany | 79 | (10) |

Managerial career
- 2016–2017: Darmstadt 98
- 2020–2021: SV Meppen
Medal record
Men's Football
Representing Germany
FIFA World Cup
| Runner-up | 2002 Korea/Japan |
| | 2006 Germany |
UEFA European Championship
| Runner-up | 2008 Austria/ Switzerland |
- * Club domestic league appearances and goals

Torsten Klaus Frings (born 22 November 1976) is a German former footballer and manager, who last managed SV Meppen.

A former midfielder, throughout his career he played for several German clubs, namely Alemannia Aachen, Werder Bremen, Borussia Dortmund, and Bayern Munich, before ending his career with Canadian MLS side Toronto FC. At international level, he played 79 matches for the Germany national team since his debut in 2001, and represented his nation at two European Championships and two FIFA World Cups.

== Club career ==
=== Early career ===
His professional career began at third division Alemannia Aachen before a move to Werder Bremen in 1996–97, helping the Weserstadion outfit to a German Cup final defeat of Bayern Munich in 1999 and tallying more than 160 Bundesliga appearances and 15 goals over five and a half seasons. He also helped them win the 1998 UEFA Intertoto Cup, scoring the decisive goal in the final against FK Vojvodina.

=== Borussia Dortmund ===
In 2002, a number of Europe's leading clubs were on Frings's trail prior to the World Cup but he opted for a four-year deal with Borussia Dortmund for a reported fee of €10 million, penning the contract two games into the competition. A regular in his first term at the Westfalenstadion, Frings also played 12 times in the UEFA Champions League, scoring home and away against Lokomotiv Moscow.

Frings's 2003–04 season only began on 30 January when he played against Schalke 04, his first game since damaging his knee against VfL Bochum in July. He took over from Tomáš Rosický in the playmaking role and scored four times in 16 games before signing a three-year contract with Dortmund's rivals, Bayern Munich.

=== Bayern Munich ===
Despite winning the domestic double with Bayern and making 29 Bundesliga and ten Champions League appearances, Frings never really enjoyed his football in Munich, and was played out of position by coach Felix Magath.

=== Werder Bremen ===
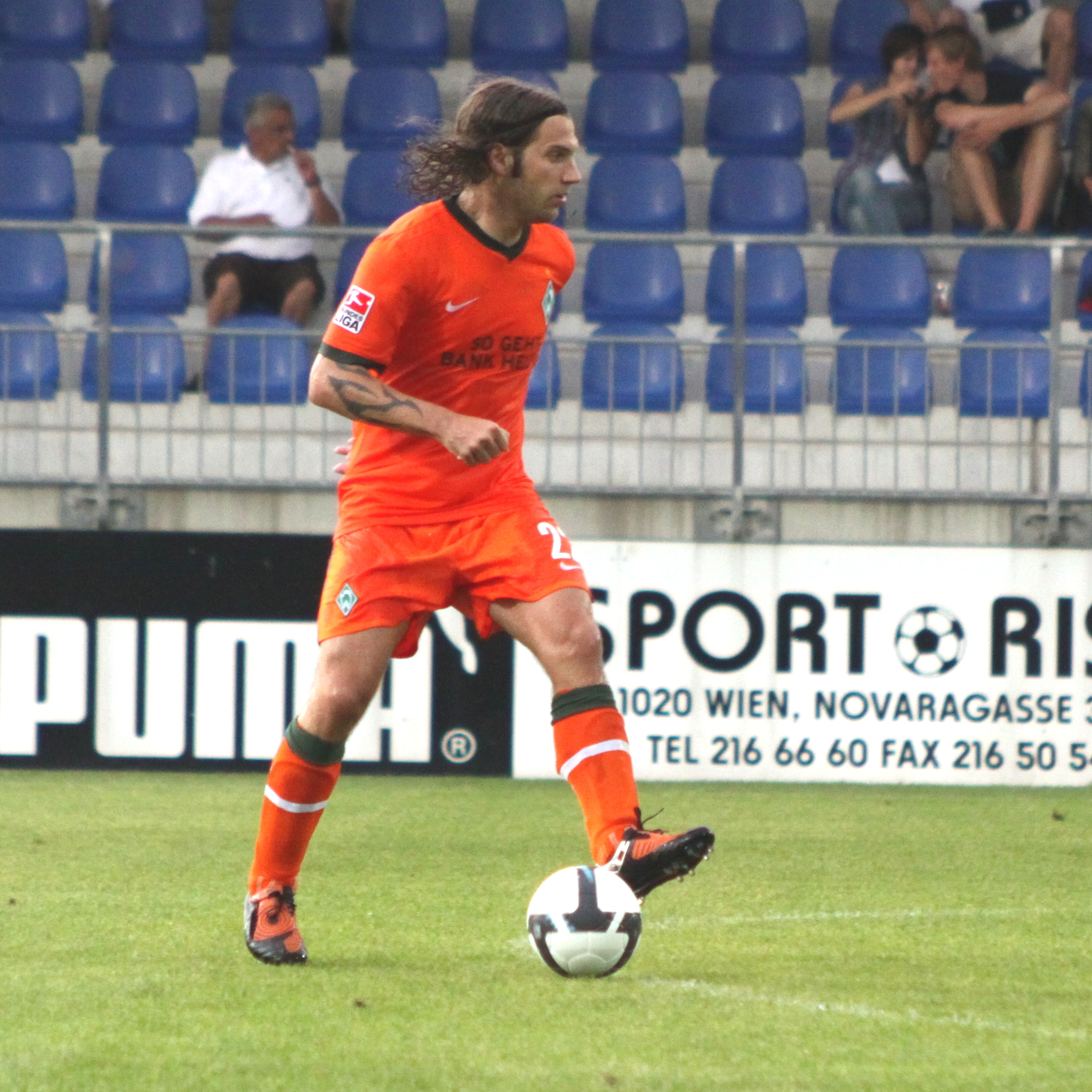
Torsten Frings with Werder Bremen

In June 2005, he rejoined Bremen for an undisclosed fee on a three-year deal, helping them past FC Basel into the Champions League group stage.

=== Toronto FC and retirement ===
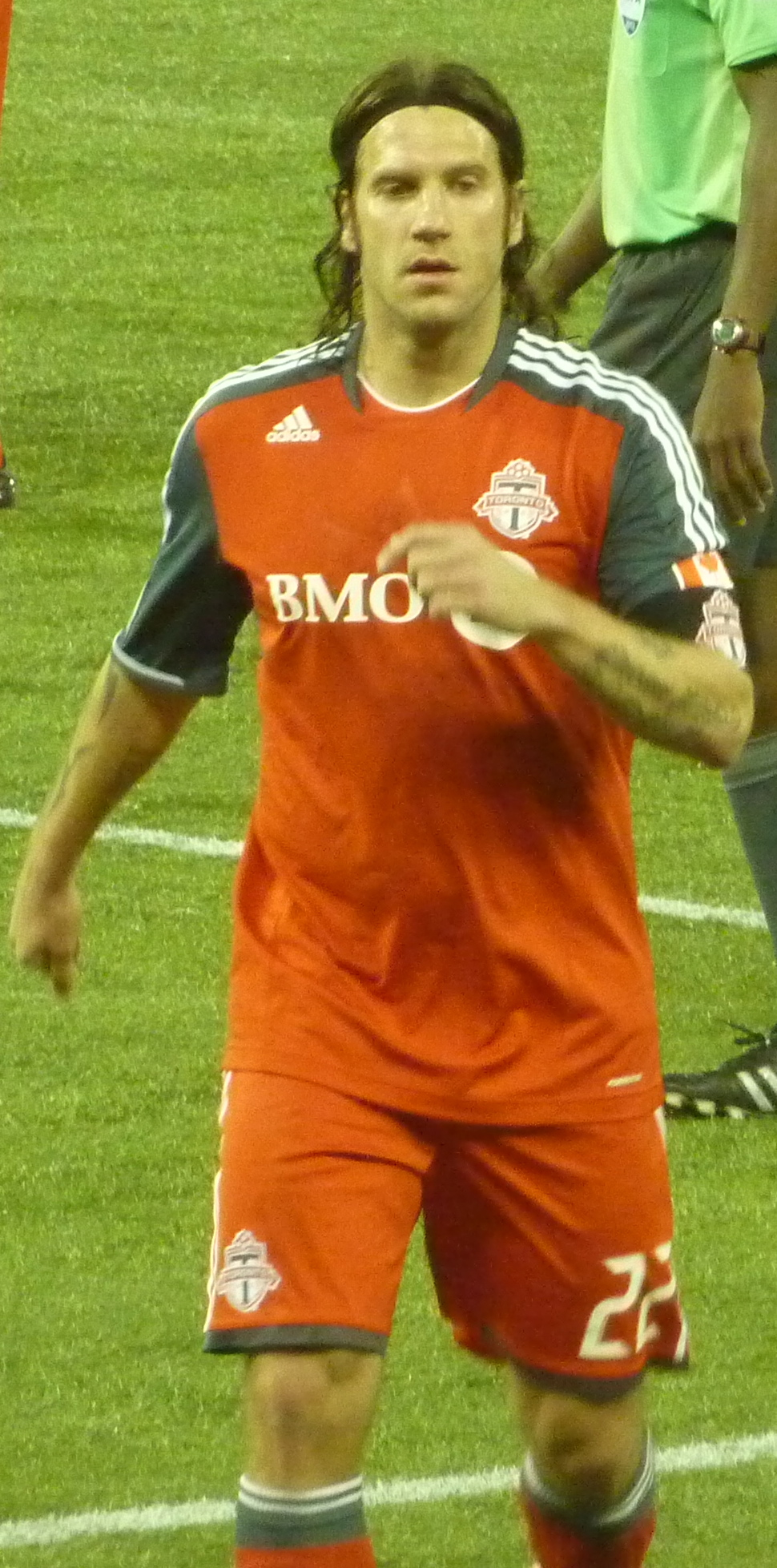
Frings with Toronto FC

On 29 June 2011, it was announced that Frings had reached an agreement to join Major League Soccer team Toronto FC as a designated player. During the press conference in which Frings was presented to the Toronto media, the club also announced the signing of Danny Koevermans. Frings made his debut for Toronto on 20 July 2011 in a 1–0 home defeat to FC Dallas. On 29 July 2011, Frings made his CONCACAF Champions League debut against Real Estelí in which he was given the honour of wearing the captain's armband for Toronto. Frings became the permanent captain of the club following Maicon Santos's transfer to Dallas. On 27 June 2012, Frings scored his first MLS goal in a 3–0 away victory over Montreal Impact, blasting a free kick in the 52nd minute from 22 yards out. Frings missed the latter portion of the 2012 season after sustaining a hip injury which required arthroscopic surgery. Frings’ subsequent recovery progressed slower than expected, ultimately leading to his decision to retire from football in February 2013. Club president, Kevin Payne indicated that the team wanted to maintain a relationship with Frings "not just for next season, but for seasons to come." Frings himself said he wanted to return to the game as a coach.

== International career ==
Frings represented Germany at the 2002 FIFA World Cup in Japan and South Korea, where the German team reached the final, only to be defeated 2–0 by Brazil. During the tournament, he was part of a controversial call when he prevented a goal with his hand on the goal line in the quarter-final match against the United States; the referee deemed the handball involuntary, however. Frings also took part at UEFA Euro 2004 and at the 2005 FIFA Confederations Cup on home soil, winning a bronze medal in the latter tournament.

Frings was later also called up to Germany's squad for the 2006 FIFA World Cup on home soil. On 9 June 2006, Frings scored Germany's fourth goal in a 4–2 win against Costa Rica in the opening match of the World Cup, with a powerful drive from more than 30 yards.

Following Germany's penalty shootout victory over Argentina on 30 June 2006, Frings was fined and suspended by FIFA for two games (one of which is subject to a six-month probationary period) for his role in the brawl that broke out between the Argentine and German teams after the match. After reviewing video footage of the brawl, FIFA's Disciplinary Committee determined that Frings had punched Argentine forward Julio Cruz and levelled punishment accordingly, even though Cruz himself had denied that Frings punched him; the second game of the suspension was made probationary due to the Committee's determination that Frings had been provoked into fighting. This suspension decision, announced by FIFA only the day before Germany's semi-final versus Italy on 4 July 2006, rendered Frings unavailable for the important match – which Germany subsequently lost; Germany finished the tournament in third place after defeating Portugal in the bronze medal match.

The controversy of the decision was also sparked by the fact that Frings' role in the brawl had been widely accentuated in the Italian media after FIFA had already announced it closed its investigations against German players. Frings answered to the accusations in an interview: "This is all politics. The Argentinians attack us, I defend myself and the Italians get worked up. With this suspension, FIFA just wanted to show that Germany doesn't get special treatment as the World Cup hosts."

Frings was also called up to Germany's Euro 2008 squad, which reached the final of the tournament only to be defeated by Spain, but was later not included in the team for the 2010 World Cup by German coach Joachim Löw. He played his last international match on 11 February 2009 in a 0–1 home defeat against Norway. In total, he earned 79 caps for Germany.

== Style of play ==
Frings was a versatile midfielder. He played in several midfield positions, although he was most comfortable in the centre, running deep from his own team's box to the opposition's box, due to his work-rate, vision, solid first touch and passing with either foot, despite his lack of notable pace. He was usually deployed as defensive midfielder, however, where he was known for his tackling playing style. A large, tenacious and physically strong player, and a vocal presence on the pitch, he was also effective in aerial play and was capable of playing as a defender, as a centre-back or sweeper, due to his organisational abilities, knowledge of the game, and fighting spirit on the pitch. In addition to his defensive attributes, Frings was also known for his leadership on the pitch, as well as his explosive, powerful shot from distance.

== Coaching career ==
=== Werder Bremen ===
After ending his playing career, Frings became a youth coach at Werder Bremen. Werder Bremen Ex-CEO Klaus Allofs stated that "he can learn the coaching profession for us from the bottom up." On 25 October 2014, after Werder Bremen fired head coach Robin Dutt, Bremen youth coach Viktor Skrypnyk was appointed as the head coach with Florian Kohfeldt, Christian Vander, and Frings all amongst Skripnik's coaching staff. He received a coaching license from the German FA after a 10-month coaching course in March 2015.

=== Darmstadt 98 ===
On 27 December 2016, Frings was appointed as the head coach of Darmstadt 98. Frings took over a team in last place and five points below the relegation playoff spot. His first match was a 0–0 draw against Borussia Mönchengladbach. Darmstadt 98 finished the 2016–17 season on the last place and was relegated to the 2. Bundesliga. On 9 December 2017, Frings was relieved of his duties as Darmstadt's head coach. His final match was a 1–0 loss to Erzgebirge Aue on 8 December 2017. He finished with a record of nine wins, eight draws, and 19 losses.

=== SV Meppen ===
He was appointed as the new head coach of SV Meppen on 14 July 2020. He was sacked on 14 April 2021.

== Personal life ==
Frings is married to Petra and they have two children, Lisa-Katharina and Lena Alina. His hobbies include spending time with his family and riding his motorcycle.

== Legacy ==
Gustavo Fring, a fictional character from the television series Breaking Bad and its spinoff Better Call Saul, was named after Frings.

== Career statistics ==
=== Club ===
Appearances and goals by club, season and competition
| Club | Season | League | | | Cup | | Continental | | Other | | Total | | Ref. |
| Club | Season | League | App | Goals | Apps | Goals | Apps | Goals | Apps | Goals | Apps | Goals | Ref. |
|---|---|---|---|---|---|---|---|---|---|---|---|---|---|
| Alemannia Aachen | 1994–95 | Regionalliga West | 6 | 0 | 0 | 0 | — | | — | | 6 | 0 | |
| Alemannia Aachen | 1995–96 | Regionalliga West | 32 | 12 | — | | — | | — | | 32 | 12 | |
| Alemannia Aachen | 1996–97 | Regionalliga West | 19 | 1 | — | | — | | — | | 19 | 1 | |
| Alemannia Aachen | Total | | 57 | 13 | 0 | 0 | 0 | 0 | 0 | 0 | 57 | 13 | — |
| Werder Bremen II | 1996–97 | Regionalliga Nord | 1 | 1 | — | | — | | — | | 1 | 1 | |
| Werder Bremen | 1996–97 | Bundesliga | 15 | 0 | 0 | 0 | — | | — | | 15 | 0 | |
| Werder Bremen | 1997–98 | Bundesliga | 28 | 2 | 2 | 0 | 3 | 0 | — | | 33 | 2 | |
| Werder Bremen | 1998–99 | Bundesliga | 23 | 3 | 4 | 3 | 12 | 3 | — | | 39 | 9 | |
| Werder Bremen | 1999–2000 | Bundesliga | 33 | 3 | 4 | 0 | 9 | 0 | 2 | 0 | 48 | 3 | |
| Werder Bremen | 2000–01 | Bundesliga | 30 | 1 | 2 | 0 | 5 | 0 | — | | 37 | 1 | |
| Werder Bremen | 2001–02 | Bundesliga | 33 | 6 | 1 | 0 | 2 | 0 | — | | 36 | 6 | |
| Werder Bremen | Total | | 162 | 15 | 13 | 3 | 31 | 3 | 2 | 0 | 208 | 21 | — |
| Borussia Dortmund | 2002–03 | Bundesliga | 31 | 6 | 2 | 0 | 12 | 2 | 1 | 0 | 46 | 8 | |
| Borussia Dortmund | 2003–04 | Bundesliga | 16 | 4 | 0 | 0 | 0 | 0 | 1 | 0 | 17 | 4 | |
| Borussia Dortmund | Total | | 47 | 10 | 2 | 0 | 12 | 2 | 2 | 0 | 63 | 12 | — |
| Bayern Munich | 2004–05 | Bundesliga | 29 | 3 | 6 | 0 | 8 | 1 | 2 | 1 | 45 | 5 | |
| Werder Bremen | 2005–06 | Bundesliga | 28 | 3 | 4 | 1 | 10 | 1 | 2 | 0 | 44 | 5 | |
| Werder Bremen | 2006–07 | Bundesliga | 33 | 1 | 0 | 0 | 6 | 1 | 2 | 1 | 41 | 3 | |
| Werder Bremen | 2007–08 | Bundesliga | 11 | 1 | 0 | 0 | 2 | 0 | 1 | 0 | 14 | 1 | |
| Werder Bremen | 2008–09 | Bundesliga | 30 | 4 | 5 | 0 | 13 | 0 | — | | 48 | 4 | |
| Werder Bremen | 2009–10 | Bundesliga | 30 | 6 | 6 | 0 | 9 | 4 | — | | 45 | 10 | |
| Werder Bremen | 2010–11 | Bundesliga | 32 | 6 | 1 | 0 | 6 | 1 | — | | 39 | 7 | |
| Werder Bremen | Total | | 164 | 21 | 16 | 1 | 47 | 6 | 5 | 1 | 231 | 30 | — |
| Toronto FC | 2011 | MLS | 13 | 0 | 0 | 0 | 6 | 0 | — | | 19 | 0 | |
| Toronto FC | 2012 | MLS | 20 | 2 | 3 | 0 | 2 | 0 | — | | 25 | 2 | |
| Toronto FC | Total | | 33 | 2 | 3 | 0 | 8 | 0 | — | | 44 | 2 | — |
| Career total | | | 493 | 65 | 40 | 4 | 105 | 13 | 11 | 5 | 649 | 84 | — |

=== International ===
Appearances and goals by national team and year
| National team | Year | Apps | Goals |
|---|---|---|---|
| Germany | 2001 | 2 | 0 |
| Germany | 2002 | 17 | 2 |
| Germany | 2003 | 4 | 0 |
| Germany | 2004 | 12 | 2 |
| Germany | 2005 | 13 | 2 |
| Germany | 2006 | 16 | 2 |
| Germany | 2007 | 6 | 2 |
| Germany | 2008 | 8 | 0 |
| Germany | 2009 | 1 | 0 |
| Total | | 79 | 10 |

Scores and results list Germany's goal tally first, score column indicates score after each Frings goal.

List of international goals scored by Torsten Frings
| No. | Date | Venue | Opponent | Score | Result | Competition |
|---|---|---|---|---|---|---|
| 1 | 27 March 2002 | Ostseestadion, Rostock, Germany | United States | 4–1 | 4–2 | Friendly |
| 2 | 9 May 2002 | Schwarzwald-Stadion, Freiburg, Germany | Kuwait | 1–0 | 7–0 | Friendly |
| 3 | 27 May 2004 | Schwarzwald-Stadion, Freiburg, Germany | Malta | 4–0 | 7–0 | Friendly |
| 4 | 15 June 2004 | Estádio do Dragão, Porto, Portugal | Netherlands | 1–0 | 1–1 | UEFA Euro 2004 |
| 5 | 9 February 2005 | Merkur Spielarena, Düsseldorf, Germany | Argentina | 1–0 | 2–2 | Friendly |
| 6 | 12 October 2005 | Volksparkstadion, Hamburg, Germany | China | 1–0 | 1–0 | Friendly |
| 7 | 27 May 2006 | Schwarzwald-Stadion, Freiburg, Germany | Luxembourg | 2–0 | 7–0 | Friendly |
| 8 | 9 June 2006 | Allianz Arena, Munich, Germany | Costa Rica | 4–2 | 4–2 | 2006 FIFA World Cup |
| 9 | 7 February 2007 | Merkur Spielarena, Düsseldorf, Germany | Switzerland | 3–0 | 3–1 | Friendly |
| 10 | 2 June 2007 | Max-Morlock-Stadion, Nuremberg, Germany | San Marino | 3–0 | 6–0 | UEFA Euro 2008 qualifying |

=== Managerial statistics ===
As of matches played on 4 April 2020

| Team! | From! | To! | Record | | | | | | | | |
| Team! | From! | To! | M | W | D | L | GF | GA | GD | Win % | Ref. |
|---|---|---|---|---|---|---|---|---|---|---|---|
| Darmstadt 98 | 27 December 2016 | 9 December 2017 | 36 | 9 | 8 | 19 | 42 | 61 | −19 | 25.00 | |
| SV Meppen | 14 July 2020 | 14 April 2021 | 31 | 11 | 3 | 17 | 32 | 51 | −19 | 35.48 | |
| Total | | | 67 | 20 | 11 | 36 | 74 | 112 | −38 | 29.85 | — |

== Honours ==
Werder Bremen

- DFB-Pokal: 1998–99, 2008–09
- DFB-Ligapokal: 2006
- UEFA Intertoto Cup: 1998

Bayern Munich

- Bundesliga: 2004–05
- DFB-Pokal: 2004–05
- DFB-Ligapokal: 2004

Toronto FC

- Canadian Championship: 2012

Germany

- FIFA World Cup runner-up: 2002; third place: 2006
- FIFA Confederations Cup third place: 2005
- UEFA European Championship runner-up: 2008

Individual

- kicker Bundesliga Team of the Season: 2001–02, 2003–04, 2005–06, 2006–07

Orders

- Silbernes Lorbeerblatt: 2002, 2006
