= Bastian Pinske =

German footballer

Personal information
- Date of birth: 19 September 1978 (age 48)
- Place of birth: Germany
- Height: 1.82 m (5 ft 11 1/2 in)
- Position: Defender

Team information
- Current team: FC Brünninghausen

Youth career
- –1997: SG Wattenscheid 09

Senior career*
Years	Team	Apps	(Gls)
1997–2003	Borussia Dortmund (A)		
2003–2004	SG Wattenscheid 09	33	(1)
2004–2008	Kickers Offenbach	84	(0)
2008–2010	Rot-Weiß Erfurt	37	(0)
2010–2012	KFC Uerdingen 05		
2012–	FC Brünninghausen		
- * Club domestic league appearances and goals as of 2 September 2010

Bastian Pinske (born 19 September 1978) is a German footballer who plays for FC Brünninghausen.
