= Ewerthon =

Brazilian footballer (born 1981)

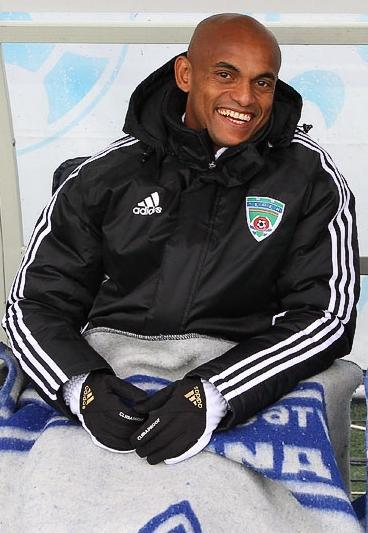
- Ewerthon with Terek Grozny in 2011

Personal information
- Full name: Ewerthon Henrique de Souza
- Date of birth: 10 June 1981 (age 45)
- Place of birth: São Paulo, Brazil
- Height: 1.72 m (5 ft 8 in)
- Positions: Forward; winger

Youth career
- Corinthians

Senior career*
Years	Team	Apps	(Gls)
1998–2001	Corinthians	31	(7)
2000	→ Rio Branco (loan)	22	(8)
2001–2005	Borussia Dortmund	119	(47)
2005–2010	Zaragoza	111	(48)
2007	→ VfB Stuttgart (loan)	11	(1)
2008	→ Espanyol (loan)	8	(1)
2010	Palmeiras	29	(8)
2011	Terek Grozny	6	(1)
2012	Al Ahli	5	(0)
2012	América-MG	12	(3)
2014	Atlético Sorocaba	8	(1)
Total		362	(125)

International career
2001–2003	Brazil	7	(0)
- * Club domestic league appearances and goals

Ewerthon Henrique de Souza (born 10 June 1981) is a Brazilian former professional footballer who played as a forward or winger. He was known for his pace, trickery and long shots, and played for clubs in Brazil, Germany, Spain, Russia and Qatar. He made seven appearances for the Brazil national team and was selected for the 2001 Copa América and the 2003 CONCACAF Gold Cup, finishing as runner-up in the latter.

Three years after his retirement, The Versed wrote a report in 2017 about Ewerthon: "he was a forgotten entity on the continent, but for a while at the start of the millennium, he looked destined for the top. Sadly, as is the case with a fair number of South American migrants, he faded into footballing obscurity".

== Club career ==
=== Corinthians ===
Born in São Paulo, Brazil, Ewerthon began his career at Brazilian club Corinthians in 1999, where he made thirteen appearances and scoring three times. Around at some point in 1999, Ewerthon was loaned out to Rio Branco, where he scored eight times in twenty-eight appearances. At the end of the 1999 season, he helped the side win both Brasileirão and Campeonato Paulista.

In the 2000 season, Ewerthon formed a striking partnership with Luizão. Despite suffering an injury around August, he returned to the starting lineup the following month. He helped them win the FIFA Club World Championship. At the end of the 2000 season, Ewerthon made twenty-two appearances and scoring eight times in all competitions.

At the start of the 2001 season, Ewerthon scored twice in a 5–0 win over Santos on 18 March 2001. He continued to be in a first team regular, playing in the attacking position. By the time of his departure, Ewerthon made sixteen appearances and scoring seven times in all competitions.

Despite his young age, he impressed many fans and pundits in Brazil and attracted the attention of European clubs.

=== Borussia Dortmund ===
Borussia Dortmund were one of the clubs chasing his signature, and on 22 September 2001, Ewerthon signed for the club, signing a five–year contract. The move reportedly cost €7.5 million.

Ewerthon made an immediate impact on his Borussia Dortmund debut when he scored and set up a goal for Jan Koller, who in return set up a goal for him, as Borussia Dortmund won 2–1 against St. Pauli on 29 September 2001. In a follow–up match against Borussia Mönchengladbach, Ewerthon set up the club's first goal of the season before earning himself a scoresheet in a 2–1 win over Borussia Mönchengladbach. Since joining the club, he quickly became a first team regular under the management of Matthias Sammer. Ewerthon then scored three goals in three matches between 17 November 2001 and 1 December 2001. Later in the 2001–02 season, his goals helped the club secure the Bundesliga title for the sixth time in their history. During the UEFA Cup campaign, Ewerthon scored two times in the knockout stage against Lille and Slovan Liberec. In the first leg semi-final of the UEFA Cup, Ewerthon set up two goals during the match in a 4–0 win over AC Milan. Despite losing 3–1 in the second leg, they reached the UEFA Cup final and played in the UEFA Cup Final which Dortmund lost 3–2 to Feyenoord at their opponents' De Kuip ground in Rotterdam. After the match, German newspaper Kicker said about his performance: “Did not enter the game at all, offensively without effect, was replaced. The only sign of life: When he initiated the counterattack, which led to the penalty.” At the end of the 2001–02 season, Ewerthon went on to make 34 appearances and scoring twelve times in all competitions.

In the 2002–03 season, Ewerthon started the season well when he scored three times in the first five league matches of the season. He continued to establish himself in the starting eleven for the side. Ewerthon made his Champions League debut on 17 September 2002, starting the match before being substituted in the 72nd minute in a 2–0 loss against Arsenal. On 26 October 2002, he scored a brace in a 4–1 win over Werder Bremen. By the end of 2002, Ewerthon scored nine goals for the side in the 2002–03 season so far. He then added two more goals later in the 2002–03 season, including one against rivals, Schalke 04. However, later in the 2002–03 season, Ewerthon's goal scoring form soon drought and struggled to score a goal. Despite missing one league matches during the 2002–03 season, he went on to make forty-eight appearances and scoring eleven times in all competitions.

In the 2003–04 season, Ewerthon continued to remain in the starting eleven for the side. He started the season well when he scored his first goal of the season against Club Brugge in the second leg third round of the UEFA Cup, but lost in the penalty shootout. His first league goal came on 13 September 2003, where he scored and set up one of the goals in a 2–1 win over Werder Bremen. During the match, Ewerthon caused an unprofessional conduct, leading the German FA fining him for €1000. He went on to add six more goals for the side by the end of 2003, including a brace against Hannover 96. On 15 February 2004, Ewerthon scored a brace in a 2–0 win over 1860 Munich, followed up by scoring in a 1–0 win over 1. FC Köln. Towards the end of the 2003–04 season, he was involved in an altercation with his teammate compatriot Evanílson. Ewerthon later added five more goals to his tally this season, scoring against Bayern Munich, Hansa Rostock, Hertha BSC (twice) and Borussia Mönchengladbach. Despite being absent three during the 2003–04 season, Ewerthon went on to make thirty-nine appearances and scoring nineteen appearances in all competitions.

Ahead of the 2004–05 season, Ewerthon was linked a move away from clubs in Italy and Spain. Despite this, he stayed at the club throughout the summer. Ewerthon started the 2004–05 season well when he scored the first two league goals for the side. Since the start of the season, Ewerthon continued to remain in the starting eleven for the side. His performance often a subjected of a criticism of new Manager Bert van Marwijk. His goal scoring form continued throughout September, scoring the total of five goals, including scoring twice against FC Bayern Munich and Unterhaching. On 19 March 2005, he scored his first goal in five months in a 3–2 win over Hamburger SV. This was followed up by scoring and set up one of the goals in a 2–1 win over Hertha BSC on 3 April 2005. Despite being absent three times during the 2004–05 season, Ewerthon went on to make thirty-three appearances and scoring twelve times in all competitions.

In the summer transfer window of 2005, he was linked a move away from the club. By the time he departure of Borussia Dormund, his time at Westfalenstadion was very successful. In four seasons he played 156 games and scored an impressive 59 goals.

=== Real Zaragoza ===
His spell in German football ended with a move to Spanish side Real Zaragoza on 8 July 2005, signing a five-year contract.

Ewerthon made his Real Zaragoza debut in the opening game of the season, starting the whole game in a 0–0 draw against Atlético Madrid. In a follow up match on 11 September 2005, he scored his first goal for the club in a 2–2 draw against Valencia. Ewerthon scored seven goals in six matches between 30 November 2005 and 8 January 2006, including scoring twice on two occasions, which the first one was against Xerez CD on 30 November 2005 and the second one was against Athletic Bilbao on 21 December 2005. Since joining the club, he became a first team regular for the side and began scoring goals on a regular basis. On 26 January 2006, in the first leg quarter-final of the Copa del Rey against FC Barcelona, Ewerthon scored twice as Real Zaragoza won 4–2. Then, in the first leg semi-final of the Copa del Rey against Real Madrid on 8 February 2006, he scored twice for the second time in the tournament in a 6–1 win. On 5 March 2006, Ewerthon scored twice for the third time in the league in a 3–1 win over Real Sociedad. Throughout April 2006, he scored two times against Espanyol; the first one came on 12 April 2006 in the Copa del Rey Final, which they lost 4–1 and the second came on 30 April 2006, which they drew 1–1. He looked good in his first season in Spanish football, as he appeared forty-six times, and scoring twenty times. This left him the club's second highest scorer that season, behind Diego Milito as the club finished 11th in the league. It also meant he was one of the top scorers in Spain of that season, finishing joint seventh with Fernando Torres.

In 2006–07 season, Ewerthon started the season well when he scored against Deportivo de La Coruña and Mallorca. Following this, Ewerthon stated he's determined to score more goals in the 2006–07 season, just as he did the previous season. However, after the signing of Pablo Aimar and the impressive form of Sergio García, his first team opportunities were not as regular, as the previous season. He also faced his own injury concern. Despite this, Ewerthon scored two goals in two matches on 5 November 2006 and 8 November 2006. After it was reported that he was involved in an altercation with teammate, César Sánchez during training on 3 March 2007, Ewerthon scored the following day in a 3–2 win over Real Sociedad. On 22 April 2007, he scored twice for the side in a 2–0 win over Celta de Vigo. At the end of the 2006–07 season, Ewerthon managed to score seven goals in thirty-four appearances in all competitions.

In the 2008–09 season, which saw Real Zaragoza relegated to Segunda División the previous season, Ewerthon was expecting to leave the club. He made a decision to stay at the club in the end. Ewerthon started the season well when he scored four times in three matches between 6 September 2008 and 21 September 2008, including scoring a brace against Real Sociedad. Around this time, he became the club's captain on number of occasions during the 2008–09 season. Ewerthon appeared in the first six league matches of the 2008–09 season until he suffered an injury that saw him miss two matches. On 25 October 2008, he scored on his return from injury in a 2–1 win over Xerez. Ewerthon then scored five goals in three matches, including scoring twice on two occasions against Eibar and Huesca. He scored four times in four matches between 25 January 2009 and 14 February 2009. He did the same thing again, scoring four times in four matches between 28 February 2009 and 21 March 2009. But he soon suffered a muscle injury that saw him miss three matches in early-April. After returning from injury, Ewerthon's goalscoring form continued when he scored eight times, including scoring three braces in three different matches. Throughout the 2008–09 season, Ewerthon competed against Tenerife's Nino over the Segunda Division's Top Scorer Award. However, during the match against Córdoba on 20 June 2009, which he scored, Ewerthon was sent off in the 52nd minute for unprofessional conduct towards the opposition player. As a result of his sending off, this cost him a chance to win the Segunda Division's Top Scorer Award in the last game of the season. Despite this, Ewerthon helped the side reach promotion to La Liga after one season at the second division and went to score twenty-eight times in thirty-seven appearances in all competitions.

In the 2009–10 season, Ewerthon missed the first four league matches, due to suspension imposed the previous season. On 27 September 2009, he returned from suspension in a 3–0 win against Getafe. In a follow-up match against Atlético Madrid, Ewerthon scored his first goal of the season in a 2-1 loss. However, he struggled to regain his place in the starting eleven for the side, due to injury concern and placed on the substitute bench. By the time of his departure, Ewerthon made thirteen appearances and scoring two times for the side in the 2009–10 season.

=== Loan spells from Real Zaragoza ===
After Real Zaragoza signed another Brazilian, Ricardo Oliveira, on 14 July 2007, Ewerthon was loaned out to German Bundesliga side VfB Stuttgart. He made his Stuttgart debut on 10 August 2007, coming on as a substitute in a 2–2 draw against FC Schalke 04. A month later on 15 September 2007, Ewerthon scored his first goal for the club in a 3–0 win over Energie Cottbus. However, his role was restricted to the substitute bench and scored once in eighteen appearances for the side. On 28 January 2008, his loan spell to VfB Stuttgart was prematurely terminated.

Ewerthon was again loaned out by Zaragoza to RCD Espanyol until the end of the season. He joined the club as a replacement for Raúl Tamudo, who suffered an injury at the time. However, Ewerthon rejected claims that he was a replacement for Tamudo. He scored on his Espanyol debut on 10 February 2008 in a 2–1 loss against Recreativo de Huelva. However, his time at Espanyol saw him placed on the substitute bench and his own injury concern. At the end of the 2007–08 season, making eight appearances and scoring once for the side, Ewerthon returned to his parent club.

=== Palmeiras ===
In early February 2010, Ewerthon was released by Real Zaragoza to sign with Brazilian Serie A club Palmeiras in order to revive his career. Upon joining the club, he was presented at the signing conference.

Ewerthon made his Palmeiras debut in the opening game of the season, where he started the whole game in a 1-0 win over Vitória. Then, on 22 May 2010, Ewerthon scored his first goals for the side in a 4-2 win over Grêmio. He scored two goals in two matches between 8 August 2010 and 14 August 2010. A month later on 15 September 2010, Ewerthon scored his sixth goal of the season in a 2–1 win over Grêmio. During a 2-0 loss against São Paulo on 19 September 2010, he suffered a knee injury, resulting in him being substituted and was sidelined for a month. Ewerthon returned from injury as a late substitute, as they lost 1-0 against Athletico Paranaense on 4 November 2010.

At the end of the 2010 season, Ewerthon went on to make twenty-nine appearances and scoring eight times for the side. However, he was released by Palmeiras in January 2011 after almost a year at the club.

=== Terek Grozny/Al Ahli ===
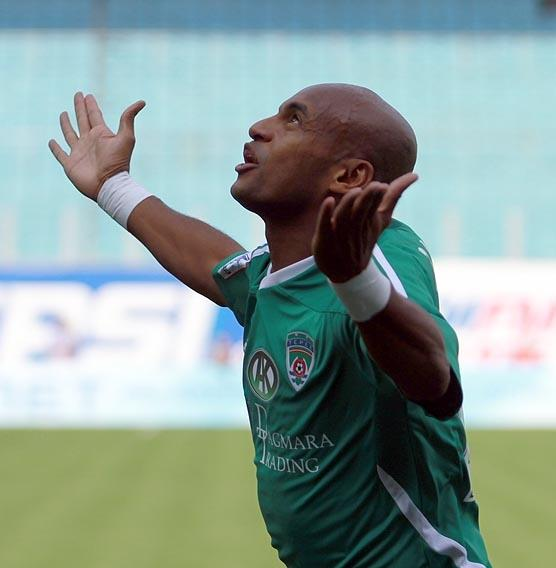
Ewerthon celebrating a goal for Terek Grozny in 2011

On 17 July 2011, Ewerthon signed a contract with Terek Grozny of the Russian Premier League on a one-year contract. He managed to score in his first game for the Russian club, a 2–6 defeat against Dynamo Moscow. After six months at the club, Ewerthon's contract at the club was terminated. By the time of his departure, he made six appearances and scoring once for the side.

On 28 January 2012, Ewerthon joined Qatari club Al Ahli on a six-month contract after completing his medical. After making five appearances for the side, Ewerthon left Al Ahli at the end of the 2011-12 season, with his intention to return to Brazil.

=== América-MG ===
Ewerthon returned to Brazil six months later, joining América-MG on 16 August 2012. The following day, he was presented by the club at the press conference.

He made his América-MG debut on 4 September 2012, coming on as a late substitute in a 0–0 draw against Paraná Clube. However, in a 1–0 win over Avaí on 14 September 2012, Ewerthon was sent off for a second bookable offence and served a one match suspension as a result. He scored on his return from suspension on 26 September 2012 in a 2–1 loss against Grêmio Barueri. Ewerthon went on to score two more goals for the side.

At the end of the 2012 season, making twelve appearances and scoring three times for the side, it was announced that Ewerthon would be leaving the club.

=== Atlético Sorocaba ===
After a one-year break, on 13 January 2014, Ewerthon signed a contract with Atlético Sorocaba.

Five days later on 18 January 2014, he made his Atlético Sorocaba debut, starting the whole game in a 1–0 loss against Rio Claro. Ewerthon soon scored his first goal for the club in a 4–1 loss against Palmeiras on 26 January 2014. He officially ended his playing career on 1 May 2014 after playing eight games for the side.

== International career ==
Ewerthon's good performances were recognised by the Brazilian national side and was called up for the first time in April 2001. He made his Brazil debut on 25 April 2001 in a 1–1 draw against Peru. He went on to make two more appearances by the end of the year.

In the 2003 CONCACAF Gold Cup, Ewerthon was called up to the squad for the first time following his impressive performance at Borussia Dortmund. He played four times, including the final of the CONCACAF Gold Cup, a 1–0 loss against Mexico. During his four seasons as a Borussia Dortund player, he appeared seven times for Brazil, albeit without scoring, between July 2001 and July 2003.

== Honours ==
Corinthians

- Brasileirão: 1999
- Campeonato Paulista: 1999, 2001
- FIFA Club World Cup: 2000

Borussia Dortmund

- Bundesliga: 2001–02
- UEFA Cup runner-up: 2001–02

Brazil U-20

- South American Youth Championship: 2001

Real Zaragoza

- Copa del Rey runner-up: 2005–06

Individual

- South American Youth Championship top scorer: 2001 (6 goals)
- Copa del Rey top scorer: 2005–06
