= Thiago (footballer, born 1984) =

Brazilian footballer

Personal information
- Full name: Anderson Thiago de Souza
- Date of birth: 13 July 1984 (age 41)
- Place of birth: Brazil
- Position: Attacker

Senior career*
Years	Team	Apps	(Gls)
- Sport Club Corinthians Alagoano
- Rio Branco Esporte Clube
-2003	União São João Esporte Clube		
2003/04-2004/05	Borussia Dortmund	0	(0)
2006	La Galaxy	0	(0)
- Esporte Clube Tigres do Brasil
- Marília Atlético Clube
- Avaí FC
2012	Associação Esportiva Santacruzense	4	(0)
2013	Batatais Futebol Clube	20	(4)
2014	Associação Atlética Aparecidense	1	(0)
2014	Batatais Futebol Clube	3	(0)
2014	Clube Atlético Votuporanguense	8	(4)
2015	Tupã Futebol Clube	2	(0)
- * Club domestic league appearances and goals

Anderson Thiago de Souza (born 13 July 1984 in Brazil), known as just Thiago, is a Brazilian retired footballer.

== Career ==
After playing for Brazilian lower league sides Sport Club Corinthians Alagoano, Rio Branco Esporte Clube, and União São João Esporte Clube, de Souza signed for Borussia Dortmund, one of Germany's most successful teams. In his first season there, 2003/04, he was one of 7 Brazilians and failed to make an appearance for the club, before joining LA Galaxy in the American top flight, making 3 league appearances there. From LA Galaxy, de Souza stent the rest of his career in the Brazilian lower leagues.
