= Léo de Deus =

Brazilian footballer (born 1977)

Personal information
- Full name: Leandro de Deus Santos
- Date of birth: 26 April 1977 (age 49)
- Place of birth: Belo Horizonte, Brazil
- Height: 1.73 m (5 ft 8 in)
- Position: Midfielder

Youth career
- Atlético Mineiro

Senior career*
Years	Team	Apps	(Gls)
1999–2005	Atlético Mineiro	4	(0)
1999	→ Uberlândia (loan)		
2000	→ Villa Nova (loan)		
2001	→ Guarani-MG (loan)	37	(8)
2002–2004	→ Borussia Dortmund II (loan)	12	(2)
2002–2004	→ Borussia Dortmund (loan)	4	(1)
2005	→ SønderjyskE (loan)		
2006–2007	SønderjyskE		
2008	Toledo Work		
2010	Brasília		
- * Club domestic league appearances and goals

Leandro de Deus Santos (born 26 April 1977), known as Leandro or Léo de Deus, is a Brazilian former footballer who played as a midfielder.

== Football career ==
Léo de Deus was born in Belo Horizonte, Minas Gerais.

In 2002, he moved to Borussia Dortmund in Germany, on loan from Clube Atlético Mineiro. He spent the vast majority of his two-season spell with the B-team, scoring the first of his two Bundesliga goals on 15 March 2003 against Hannover 96 after only three minutes on the pitch (2–0 home win); ten of his 12 league appearances were made as a substitute – in a rare start, on 12 November 2002, he played 80 minutes in a 0–1 away loss against AJ Auxerre for the campaign's UEFA Champions League, his first and only game in the competition.

Léo de Deus then spent two seasons in Denmark with SønderjyskE Fodbold, the first still owned by Atlético. He eventually retired from football in 2010 at the age of 33, after spells with Brazilian amateur clubs.

== Personal life ==
Léo de Deus's younger brothers, Dedê and Cacá, were also footballers. They too had spells in German football, and he coincided with the former at Borussia during his stint.

== Honours ==
Borussia Dortmund

- DFB-Ligapokal: Runner-up 2003
