= Salvatore Gambino =

German footballer

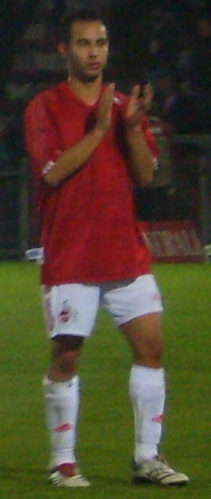
- Gambino with 1. FC Köln in 2006

Personal information
- Date of birth: 27 November 1983 (age 42)
- Place of birth: Hagen, West Germany
- Height: 1.76 m (5 ft 9 in)
- Positions: Midfielder; striker

Youth career
- 1996–2002: Borussia Dortmund

Senior career*
Years	Team	Apps	(Gls)
2002–2006	Borussia Dortmund	45	(5)
2006–2008	1. FC Köln	21	(2)
2008–2009	TuS Koblenz	2	(0)
2009	Kongsvinger IL		
2010–2012	Trapani Calcio	35	(10)
2012	Gubbio		
2012–2014	Trapani Calcio	49	(4)
2014–2015	Grosseto	20	(1)
2015–2020	Westfalia Rhynern	127	(30)

Managerial career
- 2019–2020: Westfalia Rhynern (assistant)
- 2020: Rot Weiss Ahlen (assistant)
- * Club domestic league appearances and goals

Salvatore Gambino (born 27 November 1983) is a German former professional footballer who played as a midfielder, but could play as a striker as well.

== Career ==
Having joined Borussia Dortmund in 1996, Gambino played in the club's youth teams before being promoted to the reserve team. In the 2003–04 season he had 20 Bundesliga appearances with the first team. Struggling with injuries, Gambino managed ten league games in the 2004–05 season.

In summer 2006, Gambino transferred to 1. FC Köln. Two years later, in June 2008, he joined TuS Koblenz where he was released on 24 June 2009.

He signed for then-fourth tier Italian club Trapani in January 2011 playing only ten games with no goals. He was featured more regularly throughout the 2011–12 season, now in Lega Pro Prima Divisione appearing in 32 games and scoring nine goals.

In October 2015, Gambino signed with German fifth-tier club Westfalia Rhynern.

He retired at the end of the 2019–20 season.
