= Ahmed Madouni =

Algerian footballer (born 1980)

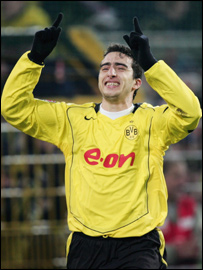

Personal information
- Full name: Ahmed Reda Madouni
- Date of birth: 4 October 1980 (age 46)
- Place of birth: Oran, Algeria
- Height: 1.91 m (6 ft 3 in)
- Position: Defender

Youth career
- 1988–1992: Lyon
- 1992–1994: Saint-Priest
- 1994–1996: Vénissieux
- 1996–1999: Montpellier

Senior career*
Years	Team	Apps	(Gls)
1999–2001	Montpellier	38	(1)
2001–2005	Borussia Dortmund	56	(3)
2005–2007	Bayer Leverkusen	29	(3)
2007–2009	Al-Gharafa	18	(0)
2009–2010	Clermont	31	(1)
2010–2012	Union Berlin	34	(1)
2012–2013	Nantes	18	(1)
2014	Energie Cottbus	9	(0)
Total		233	(10)

International career
2005	Algeria	2	(0)
- * Club domestic league appearances and goals

Ahmed Reda Madouni (Arabic: أحمد رضا مادوني; born 4 October 1980) is an Algerian former professional footballer who played as a defender.

== Club career ==
Madouni played for Montpellier and Borussia Dortmund before joining Bayer Leverkusen. In 2007, he transferred to Qatar to play for Al-Gharafa. In July 2009, Madouni signed for French Ligue 2 club Clermont. On 19 May 2010, he joined 1. FC Union Berlin on a three-year contract.

Madouni moved to Nantes in 2012.

Madouni signed a contract with Energie Cottbus on 17 January 2014 for six months with an option to extend for another year. He left Cottbus at the end of the season after they were relegated from the 2. Bundesliga.

== International career ==
A former French youth international formed in Montpellier, Madouni made the switch to join the Algeria national team in June 2005, as he played his first game for the Fennecs, a friendly against Mali. He holds two international caps.

== Honours ==
Montpellier

- UEFA Intertoto Cup: 1999

Borussia Dortmund

- Bundesliga: 2001–02

Al-Gharafa

- Qatar Stars League: 2007–08
