= Juan Fernández (footballer, born 1980) =

Argentine footballer

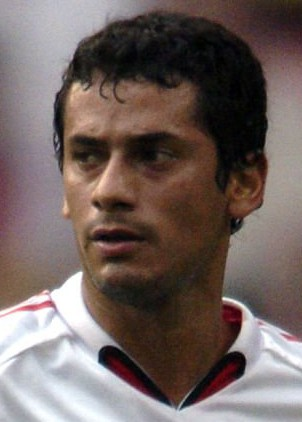

Personal information
- Full name: Juan Ramón Fernández
- Date of birth: 5 March 1980 (age 46)
- Place of birth: Gualeguaychú, Argentina
- Height: 1.76 m (5 ft 9 in)
- Position: Right back

Youth career
- Estudiantes

Senior career*
Years	Team	Apps	(Gls)
1997–2002	Estudiantes	67	(0)
2002–2005	Borussia Dortmund	14	(0)
2002–2003	Borussia Dortmund II	4	(1)
2003–2004	→ River Plate (loan)	18	(0)
2005–2006	San Lorenzo	8	(0)
2006–2007	Olimpo	19	(1)
2007–2008	Colón	33	(1)
2008	Argentinos Juniors	9	(1)
2009	Skoda Xanthi	0	(0)
2010–2013	Atlético Rafaela	30	(0)
2013	Deportes Iquique	7	(0)
2013–2014	Everton LP	7	(0)

International career
1997	Argentina U17	4	(0)
1999	Argentina U20	3	(0)
1999	Argentina	1	(0)
- * Club domestic league appearances and goals

Juan Ramón Fernández (born 5 March 1980) is an Argentine former professional football who played as a right back. He won one cap for Argentina national team.

== Career ==
A product of Estudiantes de La Plata, Fernández started his career with them in 1998, in 1999 he played a friendly match for the Argentina national football team under Marcelo Bielsa's coaching. In 2002, Fernández he was sold to Borussia Dortmund in Germany.

Fernández then played for River Plate, San Lorenzo, Olimpo de Bahía Blanca, Colón and Argentinos Juniors, all of them in the Argentine Primera División.

In 2013, Fernández moved to Chile and played for Deportes Iquique.
