= 2016–17 1. FSV Mainz 05 II season =

Mainz 05 II
2016–17 season
- Manager: Sandro Schwarz
- Stadium: Bruchwegstadion
- 3. Liga: 20th
Home colours	Away colours
- All statistics correct as of 18 March 2017.

The 2016–17 1. FSV Mainz 05 II season is the 25th season in the football club's history. Mainz 05 II now play in the 3. Liga.

== Players ==
=== Squad ===
As of 8 March 2017

Note: Flags indicate national team as defined under FIFA eligibility rules; some limited exceptions apply. Players may hold more than one non-FIFA nationality.

No.	Pos.	Nation	Player
2	DF	GER	Maximilian Rossmann
4	DF	GER	Tevin Ihrig
5	DF	GER	Noah Korczowski
6	MF	GER	Matti Steinmann
7	MF	GER	Patrick Pflücke
8	MF	GER	Daniel Bohl
9	FW	FRA	Mounir Bouziane
10	MF	GER	Philipp Klement
11	FW	CRO	Petar Slišković (on loan from Hallescher FC)
12	GK	GER	Florian Müller
14	MF	GER	Mike Andreas
15	MF	AUT	Tim Müller
17	FW	GER	Benjamin Trümner
18	FW	GER	Felix Lohkemper

No.	Pos.	Nation	Player
19	FW	GER	Aaron Seydel
20	DF	GER	Charmaine Häusl
21	DF	GER	Marcel Costly
22	MF	GER	Bilal Kamarieh
23	DF	GER	Malte Moos
24	MF	GER	Patrick Huth
25	GK	GER	Lukas Watkowiak
26	FW	GER	Leon Kern
27	DF	GER	Patrick Schorr
28	GK	GER	Patrick Manthe
30	DF	DOM	Heinz Mörschel
31	GK	GER	Marco Aulbach
33	DF	GER	Maurice Neubauer
34	MF	DEN	Niki Zimling
47	MF	KOS	Besar Halimi

== Competitions ==
Win Draw Loss

=== 3. Liga ===
==== League table ====
Pos	Team	Pld	W	D	L	GF	GA	GD	Pts	Promotion, qualification or relegation
16	Fortuna Köln	38	12	10	16	37	59	−22	46	
17	Werder Bremen II (Note: Reserve teams are ineligible for promotion or DFB-Pokal qualification.)	38	12	9	17	32	48	−16	45	
18	SC Paderborn (Note: SC Paderborn were originally relegated from the 2016–17 3. Liga after finishing 18th. However, 1860 Munich, who were relegated from the 2016–17 2. Bundesliga, were unable to obtain a license for the 2017–18 3. Liga. Therefore, SC Paderborn, who submitted a 3. Liga license application, remained in the league for the 2017–18 season.)	38	12	8	18	38	57	−19	44	
19	Mainz 05 II (R)	38	11	7	20	41	58	−17	40	Relegation to Regionalliga
20	FSV Frankfurt (Note: On 24 April 2017, FSV Frankfurt was deducted nine points for filing in for insolvency. Frankfurt appealed on 27 April 2017. On 4 May 2017, the appeal was rejected from the DFB. Another appeal was turned down on 10 May 2017. Frankfurt accepted the penalty on 17 May 2017.) (R)	38	7	13	18	38	50	−12	25	Relegation to Regionalliga

Source: DFB
Rules for classification: 1) Points; 2) Goal difference; 3) Goals scored
(R) Relegated

==== Results summary ====
Overall								Home						Away					
Pld	W	D	L	GF	GA	GD	Pts	W	D	L	GF	GA	GD	W	D	L	GF	GA	GD
38	11	7	20	41	58	−17	40	7	3	9	24	26	−2	4	4	11	17	32	−15

Last updated: 20 May 2017.

==== Results by round ====
Matchday	1	2	3	4	5	6	7	8	9	10	11	12	13	14	15	16	17	18	19	20	21	22	23	24	25	26	27	28	29	30	31	32	33	34	35	36	37	38
Ground	H	A	H	A	A	H	A	H	A	H	A	H	A	H	A	H	A	H	A	A	H	A	H	H	A	H	A	H	A	H	A	H	A	H	A	H	A	H
Result	D	L	D	L	L	W	L	L	L	D	L	W	D	L	L	W	D	L	L	L	L	W	L	W	W	L	W	L	D	L	L	L	L	W	W	W	D	W
Position	20	20	20	20	20	20	20	20	20	20	20	20	20	20	20	20	20	20	20	20	20	20	20	20	20	20	20	20	20	20	20	20	20	20	20	19	19	19

Updated to match(es) played on 20 May 2017. Source:
A = Away; H = Home; W = Win; D = Draw; L = Loss

==== Matches ====
30 July 2016 Match 1	Mainz 05 II	2–2	FSV Zwickau	Mainz
14:00	Seydel 79' (pen.); Steinmann 80'; Bohl (yellow card) 89'	Report	Göbel (yellow card) 11'; Frick 28' (yellow card) 56'; König 61'; Könnecke (yellow card) 88'	Stadium: Bruchwegstadion; Attendance: 1,798; Referee: (Germany) Florian Heft

6 August 2016 Match 2	SC Paderborn	3–1	Mainz 05 II	Paderborn
14:00	van der Biezen 6'; Schonlau 42'; Bickel 57'; Krauße (yellow card) 83'	Report	Lohkemper 15'; Rossmann (red card) 52'	Stadium: Benteler Arena; Attendance: 4,802; Referee: (Germany) Florian Badstübner

10 August 2016 Match 3	Mainz 05 II	2–2	VfL Osnabrück	Mainz
19:00	Klement 12' (pen.); Steinmann (yellow card) 57'; Seydel 66'; Neubauer (yellow card) 82'	Report	Gersbeck (yellow card) 11'; Groß (yellow card) 51'; Schulz 52'; Sangaré 77'; El Bouazzati (yellow card) 82'	Stadium: Bruchwegstadion; Attendance: 1,198; Referee: (Germany) Alexander Sather

13 August 2016 Match 4	MSV Duisburg	4–0	Mainz 05 II	Duisburg
14:00	Janjić 13'; Bajić (yellow card) 16'; Onuegbu 57' 69'; Wiegel (yellow card) 65'; Iljutcenko 71'	Report	Halimi (yellow card) 50'	Stadium: Schauinsland-Reisen-Arena; Attendance: 11,577; Referee: (Germany) Christof Günsch

27 August 2016 Match 5	Preußen Münster	1–0	Mainz 05 II	Münster
14:00	Grimaldi (yellow card) 49'; Tekerci (yellow card) 53'; Weißenfels 65'; Wiebe (yellow card) 85'	Report	Steinmann (yellow card) 50'; Häusl (yellow card) 68'	Stadium: Preußenstadion; Attendance: 5,112; Referee: (Germany) Justus Zorn

10 September 2016 Match 6	Mainz 05 II	1–0	1. FC Magdeburg	Mainz
14:00	Seydel 45'; Bohl (yellow card) 86'; Costly (yellow card) 87'	Report	Brandt (yellow card) 21'; Sowislo (yellow card) 32'; Beck (yellow card) 86'	Stadium: Bruchwegstadion; Attendance: 1,498; Referee: (Germany) Sven Waschitzki

17 September 2016 Match 7	SV Werder Bremen II	2–1	Mainz 05 II	Bremen
14:00	Kazior 25'; Veljković (yellow card) 38'; Lorenzen 84'	Report	Moos (yellow card) 21'; Steinmann (yellow card) 31'; Halimi 38' (pen.); Häusl (yellow card) 42' (yellow-red card); Seydel (yellow card) 60'; Bohl (yellow card) 90+1'	Stadium: Weserstadion Platz 11; Attendance: 434; Referee: (Germany) Oliver Lossius

21 September 2016 Match 8	Mainz 05 II	1–2	Wehen Wiesbaden	Mainz
19:00	Seydel 33'; Bouziane (yellow card) 50'; Rossmann (yellow card) 74'	Report	Müller 6' 27'; Mvibudulu (yellow card) 30'; Yegenoglu (yellow card) 33'; Andrich (yellow card) 73'	Stadium: Bruchwegstadion; Attendance: 1,006; Referee: (Germany) Tobias Fritsch

24 September 2016 Match 9	Holstein Kiel	3–0	Mainz 05 II	Kiel
14:00	Czichos 47'; Fetsch 49'; Drexler 56'	Report	Steinmann (yellow card) 87'	Stadium: Holstein-Stadion; Attendance: 4,107; Referee: (Germany) Riem Hussein

2 October 2016 Match 10	Mainz 05 II	1–1	RW Erfurt	Mainz
14:00	Häusl 20'; Halimi (red card) 71'	Report	Nikolaou 13'; Vocaj (yellow card) 71'	Stadium: Bruchwegstadion; Attendance: 998; Referee: (Germany) Matthais Jöllenbeck

16 October 2016 Match 11	Chemnitzer FC	4–1	Mainz 05 II	Chemnitz
14:00	Mast 17'; Fink 36' (pen.); Danneberg 37'; Dem (yellow card) 84'; Reinhardt 85'	Report	Costly (yellow card) 35'; Rossmann (yellow card) 59'; Bouziane 71'	Stadium: community4you ARENA; Attendance: 6,045; Referee: (Germany) Pascal Müller

23 October 2016 Match 12	Mainz 05 II	2–0	SSV Jahn Regensburg	Mainz
14:00	Trümner 33'; Parker 53' (pen.); Costly (yellow card) 56'; Müller (yellow card) 66'	Report	Geipl (yellow card) 69'; Hein (yellow card) 90+1'; George (yellow card) 90+2'	Stadium: Bruchwegstadion; Attendance: 784; Referee: (Germany) Felix Schwermer

29 October 2016 Match 13	Hansa Rostock	1–1	Mainz 05 II	Rostock
14:00	Andrist 16'; Erdmann (yellow card) 40'; Bülbül (yellow card) 65'	Report	Steinmann (yellow card) 31' (goal) 41'; Häusl (yellow card) 58'; Moos (yellow card) 90'	Stadium: Ostseestadion; Attendance: 11,383; Referee: (Germany) Michael Bacher

5 November 2016 Match 14	Mainz 05 II	0–2	SG Sonnenhof Großaspach	Mainz
14:00		Report	Röser 22'; Osei Kwadwo 76'	Stadium: Bruchwegstadion; Attendance: 498; Referee: (Germany) Henry Müller

19 November 2016 Match 15	Hallescher FC	2–0	Mainz 05 II	Halle (Saale)
14:00	Pintol 48'; Ajani (red card) 78'; Baumgärtel (yellow card) 82'; Brügmann 90'	Report	Häusl (yellow card) 37'; Trümner (red card) 51'	Stadium: Erdgas Sportpark; Attendance: 6,087; Referee: (Germany) Tim Skorczyk

27 November 2016 Match 16	Mainz 05 II	1–0	FSV Frankfurt	Mainz
14:00	Rossmann 16'; Parker (yellow card) 52'; Steinmann (yellow card) 76'; Bouziane (yellow card) 90+2'	Report	Stark (yellow card) 83'; Barry (yellow card) 88'	Stadium: Bruchwegstadion; Attendance: 1,189; Referee: (Germany) Florian Heft

3 December 2016 Match 17	VfR Aalen	0–0	Mainz 05 II	Aalen
14:00	Schwabl (yellow card) 26' (yellow-red card); Morys (yellow card) 65'; Welzmüller (yellow card) 84'	Report	Steinmann (yellow card) 23'; Rossmann (yellow card) 65'; Klement (yellow card) 67'	Stadium: SCHOLZ ARENA; Attendance: 3,057; Referee: (Germany) Christian Dietz

11 December 2016 Match 18	Mainz 05 II	0–2	Sportfreunde Lotte	Mainz
14:00	Steinmann (yellow card) 22'; Halimi (yellow card) 28'	Report	Heyer (yellow card) 42'; Dej 55'; Nauber (yellow card) 77'; Freiberger 88'	Stadium: Bruchwegstadion; Attendance: 598; Referee: (Germany) Asmir Osmanagic

17 December 2016 Match 19	Fortuna Köln	1–0	Mainz 05 II	Cologne
14:00	Alibaz 35'; Kessel (yellow card) 49'	Report	Korczowski (yellow card) 12'; Ihrig (yellow card) 27'; Steinmann (yellow card) 55'	Stadium: Südstadion; Attendance: 1,231; Referee: (Germany) Riem Hussein

28 January 2017 Match 20	FSV Zwickau	1–0	Mainz 05 II	Zwickau
14:00	Göbel 24'; Lange (yellow card) 38'; Koch (yellow card) 56'; Schröter (red card) 88'; Brinkies (yellow card) 90+2'	Report	Steinmann (yellow card) 6' (yellow-red card); Rossmann (yellow card) 55'; Bohl (yellow card) 88'	Stadium: Stadion Zwickau; Attendance: 3,612; Referee: (Germany) Pascal Müller

4 February 2017 Match 21	Mainz 05 II	0–1	SC Paderborn	Mainz
14:00	Rossmann (yellow card) 76'; Zimling (yellow card) 90+2'	Report	Schonlau (yellow card) 80'; Kruska 83'	Stadium: Bruchwegstadion; Attendance: 698; Referee: (Germany) Michael Bacher

10 February 2017 Match 22	VfL Osnabrück	1–2	Mainz 05 II	Osnabrück
19:00	Arslan 25'; Syhre (yellow card) 66'	Report	Klement 62' 68'; Slišković (yellow card) 74'	Stadium: osnatel ARENA; Attendance: 8,565; Referee: (Germany) Patrick Schult

17 February 2017 Match 23	Mainz 05 II	0–2	MSV Duisburg	Mainz
19:00	Häusl (yellow card) 81'	Report	Bomheuer 30'; Onuegbu 33'; Iljutcenko (yellow card) 62'	Stadium: Bruchwegstadion; Attendance: 1,898; Referee: (Germany) Steffen Brütting

25 February 2017 Match 24	Mainz 05 II	3–1	SC Preußen Münster	Mainz
14:00	Balogun (yellow card) 27' (yellow-red card); Mörschel 33'; Klement 61'; Trümner 70'; Zimling (yellow card) 80'	Report	Mai (yellow card) 66'; Al-Hazaimeh 74'	Stadium: Bruchwegstadion; Attendance: 898; Referee: (Germany) Steffen Mix

4 March 2017 Match 25	1. FC Magdeburg	1–2	Mainz 05 II	Magdeburg
14:00	Schwede 35' (yellow card) 58' (yellow-red card)	Report	Seydel 8'; Korczowski (yellow card) 29'; Zimling 53'; Šverko (yellow card) 69'	Stadium: MDCC-Arena; Attendance: 15,456; Referee: (Germany) Sven Waschitzki

11 March 2017 Match 26	Mainz 05 II	0–1	Werder Bremen II	Mainz
14:00	Serdar (yellow card) 86'; Hack (yellow card) 87' (red card) 90+4'; Rossman (yellow card) 90+3'	Report	Yatabaré (yellow card) 19' (yellow-red card); Kazior 43'; Eilers (yellow card) 82'	Stadium: Bruchwegstadion; Attendance: 698; Referee: (Germany) Oliver Lossius

15 March 2017 Match 27	Wehen Wiesbaden	0–2	Mainz 05 II	Wiesbaden
19:00	Funk (yellow card) 27'; Mintzel (yellow card) 70'	Report	Slišković 7' (yellow card) 44'; Bouziane 28'; Holtmann (yellow card) 41'; Šverko (yellow card) 62'	Stadium: BRITA-Arena; Attendance: 2,652; Referee: (Germany) Bastian Dankert

18 March 2017 Match 28	Mainz 05 II	0–3	Holstein Kiel	Mainz
14:00	Slišković (yellow card) 3'; Holtmann (yellow card) 61'	Report	Peitz (yellow card) 13' (goal) 32'; Bieler (yellow card) 42'; Schmidt (yellow card) 49'; Herrmann (yellow card) 55'; Lenz 71'; Schindler 82'	Stadium: Bruchwegstadion; Attendance: 1,198; Referee: (Germany) Michael Bacher

25 March 2017 Match 29	RW Erfurt	0–0	Mainz 05 II	Erfurt
14:00	Erb (yellow card) 28'; Nikolaou (yellow card) 35'; Odak (yellow card) 51'	Report	Zimling (yellow card) 42'	Stadium: Steigerwaldstadion; Attendance: 4,399; Referee: (Germany) Justus Zorn

31 March 2017 Match 30	Mainz 05 II	0–1	Chemnitzer FC	Mainz
18:30		Report	Fink 12' (pen.)	Stadium: Bruchwegstadion; Attendance: 1,198; Referee: (Germany) Patrick Alt

4 April 2017 Match 31	Jahn Regensburg	2–1	Mainz 05 II	Regensburg
19:00	Odabas 23'; Thommy 35' (yellow card) 87'	Report	Seydel 21'; Halimi (yellow card) 28'; Trümner (yellow card) 32'; Häusl (yellow card) 53'; Zimling (yellow card) 71'; Klement (yellow card) 86'	Stadium: Continental Arena; Attendance: 4,260; Referee: (Germany) Johann Pfeifer

9 April 2017 Match 32	Mainz 05 II	2–4	Hansa Rostock	Mainz
14:00	Serdar (yellow card) 25'; Halimi 49'; Costly 90+3'	Report	Gardawski (yellow card) 25'; Quiring 36' 72' 86'; Erdmann (yellow card) 49'; Holthaus (yellow card) 63'; Andrist 77'	Stadium: Bruchwegstadion; Attendance: 2,098; Referee: (Germany) Eric Müller

15 April 2017 Match 33	Sonnenhof Großaspach	2–1	Mainz 05 II	Aspach, Baden-Württemberg
14:00	Leist (yellow card) 8'; Gehring 11' (yellow card) 90+2'; Lorch 15'; Krause (yellow card) 36'	Report	Schorr (yellow card) 30'; Serdar (yellow card) 60'; Bohl 67'; Rossmann (yellow card) 84'	Stadium: Mechatronik Arena; Attendance: 1,250; Referee: (Germany) Florian Kornblum

22 April 2017 Match 34	Mainz 05 II	3–2	Hallescher FC	Mainz
14:00	Slišković 6' 71'; Bohl 20'; Costly (yellow card) 76'	Report	Diring 21'; Barnofsky (yellow card) 48'; Ajani 65'; Röser (yellow card) 76'	Stadium: Bruchwegstadion; Attendance: 698; Referee: (Germany) Sven Waschitzki

29 April 2017 Match 35	FSV Frankfurt	1–2	Mainz 05 II	Frankfurt
14:00	Graudenz 51'; Schäfer (yellow card) 60'	Report	Slišković 45'; Bohl (yellow card) 60'; Rossmann 69'; Ihrig (yellow card) 81'	Stadium: Frankfurter Volksbank Stadion; Attendance: 2,268; Referee: (Germany) Michael Bacher

6 May 2017 Match 36	Mainz 05 II	2–0	VfR Aalen	Mainz
14:00	Lohkemper 2'; Slišković (yellow card) 24' (goal) 32'	Report	Preißinger (yellow card) 37'	Stadium: Bruchwegstadion; Attendance: 898; Referee: (Germany) Robert Kempter

13 May 2017 Match 37	Sportfreunde Lotte	3–3	Mainz 05 II	Lotte
13:30	Lindner 20' 35'; Wendel (yellow card) 57'; Heyer (yellow card) 78'; Steinhart (yellow card) 82'; Schikowski 89'	Report	Slišković 13'; Halimi 52'; Lohkemper 58'; Slišković (yellow card) 58'; Bohl (yellow card) 60'; Lohkemper (yellow card) 74'	Stadium: Frimo Stadion; Attendance: 1673; Referee: (Germany) Benjamin Bläser

20 May 2017 Match 38	Mainz 05 II	4–0	Fortuna Köln	Mainz
13:30	Klement 9'; Bohl 27'; Müller (yellow card) 45+1'; Halimi 53'; Lohkemper 71'	Summary	Schneider (yellow card) 26'	Stadium: Bruchwegstadion; Attendance: 798; Referee: (Germany) Florian Heft
