= 2013–14 Regionalliga =

6th season of the Regionalliga

Regionalliga
- Season: 2013–14
- Champions: FC Bayern Munich II; Fortuna Köln; SG Sonnenhof Großaspach; TSG Neustrelitz; VfL Wolfsburg II
- Promoted: Fortuna Köln; SG Sonnenhof Großaspach; FSV Mainz 05 II
- Biggest home win: Hannover 96 II 9–2 Werder Bremen II (26 October 2013)
- Biggest away win: Germania Halberstadt 3–8 1. FC Union Berlin II (27 October 2013)
- Highest scoring: Germania Halberstadt 3–8 1. FC Union Berlin II (27 October 2013); Hannover 96 II 9–2 Werder Bremen II (26 October 2013)

The 2013–14 Regionalliga was the sixth season of the Regionalliga, the second under the new format, as the fourth tier of the German football league system. The champions of Regionalliga Nord – Holstein Kiel – and Regionalliga Nordost – RB Leipzig – as well as Regionalliga Südwest runners-up SV Elversberg were promoted to the 3. Liga. Alemannia Aachen, Babelsberg 03 and Kickers Offenbach were relegated from 3. Liga.

== Regionalliga Nord ==
18 teams from the states of Bremen, Hamburg, Lower Saxony and Schleswig-Holstein competed in the second season of the reformed Regionalliga Nord. 15 teams were retained from the last season and 3 teams were promoted from the Oberliga – Niedersachsenliga champions Eintracht Braunschweig II and the two Regionalliga North promotion playoff winners Eintracht Norderstedt (4th place Oberliga Hamburg) and SV Eichede (champions Schleswig-Holstein-Liga). Three teams were relegated, unless the number of teams decreased below 18 for the following season. In this case, the best relegated team stayed in the league. Any further spots were allocated to the promotion play-off participants.

=== League table ===
Pos	Team	Pld	W	D	L	GF	GA	GD	Pts	Qualification or relegation
1	VfL Wolfsburg II (C)	34	23	5	6	85	28	+57	74	Qualification to promotion play-offs
2	Werder Bremen II	34	23	4	7	72	42	+30	73	
3	VfB Oldenburg	34	17	9	8	74	43	+31	60	
4	SV Meppen	34	16	11	7	57	42	+15	59	
5	Goslarer SC 08	34	17	8	9	66	50	+16	59	
6	ETSV Weiche Flensburg	34	16	9	9	56	38	+18	57	
7	TSV Havelse	34	15	9	10	50	47	+3	54	
8	BSV Schwarz-Weiß Rehden	34	11	13	10	50	47	+3	46	
9	FC St. Pauli II	34	14	4	16	55	58	−3	46	
10	FC Eintracht Norderstedt 03	34	11	10	13	50	57	−7	43	
11	Hannover 96 II	34	10	11	13	63	59	+4	41	
12	BV Cloppenburg	34	11	8	15	54	66	−12	41	
13	Eintracht Braunschweig II	34	8	12	14	38	48	−10	36	
14	Hamburger SV II	34	8	10	16	44	54	−10	34	
15	VfR Neumünster	34	8	10	16	32	54	−22	34	
16	SV Eichede (R)	34	7	5	22	47	80	−33	26	Relegation to Oberliga
17	SC Victoria Hamburg (R)	34	5	8	21	23	83	−60	23	Relegation to Oberliga
18	SV Wilhelmshaven (Note: Due to FIFA discipline, SV Wilhelmshaven was placed in 18th position after the season) (R)	34	7	12	15	38	58	−20	33	Relegation to Oberliga

Source: kicker.de
Rules for classification: 1) points; 2) goal difference; 3) number of goals scored.
(C) Champions; (R) Relegated

=== Top goalscorer ===
Rank	Player	Club	Goals
1	(Democratic Republic of the Congo) Addy-Waku Menga	VfB Oldenburg	23
2	(Germany) Kevin Scheidhauer	VfL Wolfsburg II	20
3	(Germany) Justin Eilers	VfL Wolfsburg II	17
4	(Germany) Andreas Gerdes-Wupts	BV Cloppenburg	15
4	(Poland) Martin Kobylański	Werder Bremen II	15
4	(Germany) Max Kremer	SV Meppen	15

== Regionalliga Nordost ==
16 teams from the states of Berlin, Brandenburg, Mecklenburg-Vorpommern, Saxony, Saxony-Anhalt and Thuringia competed in the second season of the reformed Regionalliga Nordost. 13 teams were retained from the last season and 2 teams that were promoted from the Oberliga. Viktoria 89 qualified by winning NOFV-Oberliga Nord and Wacker Nordhausen qualified by winning NOFV-Oberliga Süd. A maximum of two clubs were relegated.

=== League table ===
Pos	Team	Pld	W	D	L	GF	GA	GD	Pts	Qualification or relegation
1	TSG Neustrelitz (C)	30	23	1	6	65	30	+35	70	Qualification to promotion play-offs
2	1. FC Magdeburg	30	18	4	8	71	39	+32	58	
3	FC Carl Zeiss Jena	30	15	7	8	54	39	+15	52	
4	1. FC Union Berlin II	30	14	8	8	67	51	+16	50	
5	FSV Wacker 90 Nordhausen	30	13	5	12	43	46	−3	44	
6	FSV Zwickau	30	12	7	11	38	38	0	43	
7	VfB Auerbach	30	12	5	13	41	45	−4	41	
8	FC Viktoria 1889 Berlin	30	8	15	7	41	40	+1	39	
9	VFC Plauen	30	9	12	9	48	49	−1	39	
10	ZFC Meuselwitz	30	11	3	16	31	49	−18	36	
11	Berliner AK 07	30	10	5	15	41	46	−5	35	
12	Hertha BSC II	30	9	7	14	38	46	−8	34	
13	Germania Halberstadt	30	10	4	16	45	61	−16	34	
14	SV Babelsberg 03	30	9	6	15	37	50	−13	33	
15	1. FC Lok Leipzig (R)	30	8	8	14	29	41	−12	32	Relegation to Oberliga
16	Optik Rathenow (R)	30	8	5	17	34	53	−19	29	Relegation to Oberliga

Source: kicker.de
Rules for classification: 1) points; 2) goal difference; 3) number of goals scored.
(C) Champions; (R) Relegated

=== Top goalscorers ===
Rank	Player	Club	Goals
1	(Germany) Christian Beck	1. FC Magdeburg	22
2	(Serbia) Velimir Jovanovic	TSG Neustrelitz	19
3	(Germany) Benjamin Girth	VFC Plauen	15
4	(Austria) Dino Medjedovic	TSG Neustrelitz	14
5	(Germany) Lars Fuchs	1. FC Magdeburg	13
5	(Germany) David Hollwitz	1. FC Union Berlin II	13

== Regionalliga West ==
19 teams from North Rhine-Westphalia competed in the second season of the reformed Regionalliga West: 15 teams were retained from the last season, Alemannia Aachen were relegated from 3. Liga and three teams were promoted from the Oberliga. Uerdingen 05 won Oberliga Niederrhein), and Lippstadt 08 and Wattenscheid 09 finished first and second in (Oberliga Westfalen). Two teams were relegated to achieve an 18-team league in the following season.

=== League table ===
Pos	Team	Pld	W	D	L	GF	GA	GD	Pts	Qualification or relegation
1	SC Fortuna Köln (C, P)	36	23	7	6	73	36	+37	76	Qualification to promotion play-offs
2	Sportfreunde Lotte	36	18	15	3	57	26	+31	69	
3	Rot-Weiß Oberhausen	36	20	9	7	51	33	+18	69	
4	FC Viktoria Köln	36	17	14	5	62	39	+23	65	
5	Sportfreunde Siegen	36	18	10	8	57	34	+23	64	
6	FC Schalke 04 II	36	16	10	10	52	37	+15	58	
7	Borussia Mönchengladbach II	36	14	13	9	55	42	+13	55	
8	Bayer 04 Leverkusen II	36	13	13	10	68	51	+17	52	Withdrawal from competition at end of season
9	Rot-Weiss Essen	36	14	10	12	54	48	+6	52	
10	Fortuna Düsseldorf II	36	13	11	12	53	48	+5	50	
11	SC Verl	36	14	8	14	41	45	−4	50	
12	1. FC Köln II	36	14	7	15	45	47	−2	49	
13	Alemannia Aachen	36	14	7	15	42	46	−4	49	
14	VfL Bochum II	36	8	9	19	34	53	−19	33	
15	SG Wattenscheid 09	36	7	12	17	40	67	−27	33	
16	SC Wiedenbrück 2000	36	7	9	20	46	76	−30	30	
17	KFC Uerdingen 05	36	7	9	20	30	71	−41	27	
18	SV Lippstadt 08 (R)	36	4	12	20	38	64	−26	24	Relegation to Oberliga (Note: Depending on how many teams are relegated from the 3.Liga & the promotion results of the Regionalliga West champion, five teams could be relegated. As Bayer Leverkusen decided to withdraw their team, Arminia Bielefeld's reserves were ineligible for promotion to the Regionalliga, and Fortuna Köln won promotion to the 3rd Liga, only the bottom two teams were relegated.)
19	SSVg Velbert (R)	36	4	9	23	34	72	−38	21	Relegation to Oberliga

Source: kicker.de
Rules for classification: 1) points; 2) goal difference; 3) number of goals scored.
(C) Champions; (P) Promoted; (R) Relegated

=== Top goalscorer ===
Rank	Player	Club	Goals
1	(Germany) Aziz Bouhaddouz	Bayer Leverkusen II	24
2	(Germany) Robert Leipertz	FC Schalke 04 II	20
3	(Turkey) Ercan Aydogmus	Fortuna Köln	18
4	(Germany) Fatih Candan	FC Viktoria Köln	17
5	(Germany) David Jansen	Rot-Weiß Oberhausen	16
5	(Germany) Marcel Platzek	Rot-Weiß Essen	16

== Regionalliga Südwest ==
18 teams from Baden-Württemberg, Hesse, Rhineland-Palatinate and Saarland competed in the second season of the newly formed Regionalliga Südwest. 14 teams were retained from last season and 3 teams were promoted from the Oberliga: Neckarelz won the Oberliga Baden-Württemberg, Baunatal won the Hessenliga, and Zweibrücken won the Oberliga Rheinland-Pfalz/Saar). Kickers Offenbach were denied a license for the 3. Liga and also played in the Regionalliga Südwest. Depending on developments in 3. Liga, a minimum of two teams were relegated.

=== League table ===
Pos	Team	Pld	W	D	L	GF	GA	GD	Pts	Qualification or relegation
1	SG Sonnenhof Großaspach (C, P)	34	23	6	5	71	37	+34	75	Qualification to promotion play-offs
2	SC Freiburg II	34	20	7	7	69	37	+32	67	No application for promotion to 3. Liga
3	1. FSV Mainz 05 II (P)	34	20	7	7	63	34	+29	67	Qualification to promotion play-offs
4	1. FC Kaiserslautern II	34	17	12	5	66	31	+35	63	
5	Waldhof Mannheim	34	15	8	11	48	40	+8	53	
6	Eintracht Trier	34	13	12	9	49	37	+12	51	
7	SVN Zweibrücken	34	14	9	11	45	39	+6	51	
8	Kickers Offenbach	34	13	11	10	39	31	+8	50	
9	SpVgg Neckarelz	34	13	9	12	42	47	−5	48	
10	1899 Hoffenheim II	34	14	3	17	52	45	+7	45	
11	FC 08 Homburg	34	12	8	14	50	47	+3	44	
12	Eintracht Frankfurt II	34	12	6	16	52	55	−3	42	Withdrawal from competition at end of season
13	KSV Hessen Kassel	34	9	13	12	41	64	−23	40	
14	TuS Koblenz	34	10	9	15	36	46	−10	39	
15	SSV Ulm 1846 (R)	34	8	8	18	39	56	−17	32	Relegation to Oberliga (Note: SSV Ulm 1846 was relegated after declaring insolvency. As a result, Wormatia Worms and KSV Baunatal were spared from relegation to fill vacancies.)
16	Wormatia Worms	34	6	12	16	36	62	−26	30	
17	KSV Baunatal	34	6	7	21	33	71	−38	25	
18	SC Pfullendorf (R)	34	4	7	23	29	81	−52	19	Relegation to Oberliga

Source: kicker.de
Rules for classification: 1) points; 2) goal difference; 3) number of goals scored.
(C) Champions; (P) Promoted; (R) Relegated

=== Top goalscorer ===
Rank	Player	Club	Goals
1	(Croatia) Petar Sliskovic	1. FSV Mainz 05 II	23
2	(Germany) Jan-Lucas Dorow	1. FC Kaiserslautern II	18
2	(Germany) Amir Falahen	SC Freiburg II	18
4	(Germany) Mario Pokar	1. FC Kaiserslautern II	15
5	(Germany) Tobias Rühle	SG Sonnenhof Großaspach	14

== Regionalliga Bayern ==
19 teams from Bavaria competed in the second season of the newly formed Regionalliga Bayern. 17 teams were retained from the last season and 2 teams were promoted from the Bayernliga. Schweinfurt 05 won Bayernliga Nord and Schalding-Heining won Bayernliga Süd. The bottom three teams were relegated, the two teams ranked 15th and 16th entered a play-off round.

=== League table ===
Pos	Team	Pld	W	D	L	GF	GA	GD	Pts	Qualification or relegation
1	FC Bayern Munich II (C)	36	25	4	7	94	33	+61	79	Qualification to promotion play-offs
2	FV Illertissen	36	22	9	5	79	33	+46	75	Qualification to DFB-Pokal
3	TSV 1860 München II	36	22	6	8	68	41	+27	72	
4	FC Augsburg II	36	20	9	7	63	34	+29	69	
5	TSV Buchbach	36	18	7	11	63	55	+8	61	
6	FC Ingolstadt 04 II	36	16	9	11	65	50	+15	57	
7	SV Seligenporten	36	15	9	12	55	60	−5	54	
8	1. FC Nürnberg II	36	13	14	9	57	46	+11	53	
9	SpVgg Greuther Fürth II	36	15	7	14	68	57	+11	52	
10	FC Eintracht Bamberg	36	14	9	13	63	65	−2	51	
11	Würzburger Kickers	36	13	10	13	61	55	+6	49	
12	SV Schalding-Heining	36	11	9	16	52	71	−19	42	
13	FC Memmingen	36	11	8	17	51	56	−5	41	
14	SV Heimstetten	36	9	11	16	50	82	−32	38	
15	TSV 1860 Rosenheim (R)	36	9	10	17	45	59	−14	37	Qualification to relegation play-offs
16	1. FC Schweinfurt 05	36	9	9	18	46	71	−25	36	Qualification to relegation play-offs
17	SpVgg Bayern Hof (R)	36	10	6	20	42	68	−26	36	Relegation to Bayernliga
18	Viktoria Aschaffenburg (R)	36	5	8	23	45	86	−41	23	Relegation to Bayernliga
19	TSV Rain am Lech (R)	36	4	8	24	45	90	−45	20	Relegation to Bayernliga

Source: kicker.de
Rules for classification: 1) points; 2) head-to-head points; 3) head-to-head goal difference; 4) head-to-head goals scored; 5) head-to-head goals scored away from home (only if two teams are tied in points); 6) goal difference; 7) number of goals scored; 8) wins; 9) goals scored away from home; 10) drawing of lots
(C) Champions; (R) Relegated

=== Top goalscorer ===
Rank	Player	Club	Goals
1.	(Germany) Nicolas Görtler	Eintracht Bamberg	21
2	(Kyrgyzstan) Vitalij Lux	FV Illertissen	20
3	(Germany) Dominik Stolz	SV Seligenporten	18
3	(Germany) Erik Thommy	FC Augsburg II	18
5	(Croatia) Antonio-Mirko Čolak	1. FC Nürnberg II	17

== Promotion play-offs ==
The draw for the 2013–14 promotion play-offs was held on 26 April, with another draw between the Regionalliga Südwest teams held on 13 May 2014.

SC Freiburg II, runners-up of the Regionalliga Südwest, did not submit license documents for the 3. Liga. Therefore, Mainz 05 II, third in the Regionalliga Südwest, took the spot.

=== Summary ===
The first legs were played on 28 May, and the second legs were played on 1 June 2014.

Team 1	Agg.	Team 2	1st leg	2nd leg
TSG Neustrelitz (NO)	1–5	Mainz 05 II (S3)	0–2	1–3
Sonnenhof Großaspach (S1)	1–0	VfL Wolfsburg II (N)	0–0	1–0
Fortuna Köln (W)	2–2 (a)	Bayern Munich II (B)	1–0	1–2

=== Matches ===
All times Central European Summer Time (UTC+2)

28 May 2014
19:00

TSG Neustrelitz	0–2	Mainz 05 II
	Report	Bouziane 6'; Bohl 62'

Parkstadion, Neustrelitz
Attendance: 4,119
Referee: Norbert Grudzinski
1 June 2014
14:00

Mainz 05 II	3–1	TSG Neustrelitz
Parker 41'; Bouziane 62'; Wachs 90+1'	Report	Weidlich 76'

Bruchwegstadion, Mainz
Attendance: 6,099
Referee: Harm Osmers

Mainz 05 II won 5–1 on aggregate.

28 May 2014
19:00

Sonnenhof Großaspach	0–0	VfL Wolfsburg II
	Report

Comtech Arena, Aspach
Attendance: 5,798
Referee: Benjamin Cortus
1 June 2014
14:00

VfL Wolfsburg II	0–1	Sonnenhof Großaspach
	Report	Senesie 68'

VfL-Stadion am Elsterweg, Wolfsburg
Attendance: 3,517
Referee: Markus Wingenbach

Sonnenhof Großaspach won 1–0 on aggregate.

28 May 2014
19:00

Fortuna Köln	1–0	Bayern Munich II
Kraus 87'	Report

Südstadion, Cologne
Attendance: 10,161
Referee: Martin Thomsen
1 June 2014
14:00

Bayern Munich II	2–1	Fortuna Köln
Sallahi 20', 88'	Report	Laux 90+4'

Städtisches Stadion an der Grünwalder Straße, Munich
Attendance: 7,738
Referee: Robert Kampka

2–2 on aggregate. Fortuna Köln won on away goals.
