= 2019–20 Regionalliga =

12th season of the Regionalliga

Regionalliga
- Season: 2019–20
- Champions: VfB Lübeck (Nord); 1. FC Lokomotive Leipzig (Nordost); SV Rödinghausen (West); 1. FC Saarbrücken (Südwest)
- Promoted: VfB Lübeck; 1. FC Saarbrücken; Türkgücü München; SC Verl
- Relegated: Wacker Nordhausen; FC Rot-Weiß Erfurt; TuS Haltern; SG Wattenscheid

The 2019–20 Regionalliga was the twelfth season of the Regionalliga, the eighth under the new format, as the fourth tier of the German football league system.

== Format ==
The same promotion format as in the previous season was used. According to the draw that took place on 27 April 2018, the Regionalliga Nord, Südwest, and Bayern champions were directly promoted to the 2020–21 3. Liga, while the champions of the Regionalliga Nordost and West played promotion play-offs to determine the fourth team to be promoted.

== Effects of the COVID-19 pandemic ==
Due to the COVID-19 pandemic in Germany, all scheduled match days in the five Regionalligas were initially suspended in March 2020. The Bavarian Football Association (BFV) announced its decision to suspend all scheduled match days indefinitely on 4 March 2020.

The Regionalliga Südwest was cancelled on 26 May 2020. 1. FC Saarbrücken were declared champions and were promoted to the 3. Liga, while no teams were relegated and four teams were promoted from the Oberliga, leading to an expansion of the league for the upcoming season.

The Regionalliga Nordost was also cancelled on 5 June 2020. Lokomotive Leipzig were declared champions and qualified for the promotion play-offs, while no teams were relegated based on sporting criteria and two teams were promoted from the NOFV-Oberliga, leading to an expansion of the league for the upcoming season. Rot-Weiß Erfurt had been placed into administration on 29 January 2020 and was therefore relegated to the NOFV-Oberliga. On 25 June 2020, Wacker Nordhausen was voluntarily relegated to the Oberliga after filing for insolvency in December.

The Regionalliga Bayern clubs voted on 4 June 2020 to extend their league season beyond September, which meant the Bavarian Football Association had to cancel the 2020–21 season and continue without Türkgücü München, which the BFA registered for promotion to the 3. Liga. Thus, Bavaria is to be represented by a team that wins a play-off series, to be held in the spring of 2021, among the top four teams at the end of the resumed Regionalliga Bayern season. They would have already submitted applications for 3. Liga licences. The Bavarian play-off winners are to face the Regionalliga Nord champions for a place in the 2021–22 3. Liga.

The Regionalliga West was curtailed on 20 June 2020. SV Rödinghausen were declared champions. Since they did not apply for a 3. Liga licence, second-placed SC Verl qualified for the promotion play-offs, while no teams were relegated based on sporting criteria and three teams were promoted from the Oberliga, leading to an expansion of the league for the upcoming season. SG Wattenscheid had been placed into administration on 23 October 2019 and was therefore relegated to the Oberliga.

The Regionalliga Nord was terminated on 25 June 2020. VfB Lübeck were declared champions and were promoted to the 3. Liga, while no teams were relegated and five teams were promoted from the Oberliga, leading to an expansion of the league for the upcoming season.

== Regionalliga Nord ==
18 teams from the states of Bremen, Hamburg, Lower Saxony and Schleswig-Holstein competed in the eighth season of the reformed Regionalliga Nord. HSC Hannover was promoted from the 2018–19 Niedersachsenliga, Altona 93 was promoted from the 2018–19 Oberliga Hamburg and Heider SV was promoted from the 2018–19 Schleswig-Holstein-Liga.

After the season's cancellation, the final standings were based on an average of points earned per matches played.

Pos	Team	Pld	W	D	L	GF	GA	GD	PPG	Promotion
1	VfB Lübeck (C, P)	25	20	1	4	64	24	+40	2.44	Promotion to 3. Liga
2	VfL Wolfsburg II	24	18	2	4	72	27	+45	2.33	
3	Weiche Flensburg	23	14	4	5	35	22	+13	2.00	
4	SV Drochtersen/Assel	25	14	2	9	37	33	+4	1.76	
5	Eintracht Norderstedt	24	12	3	9	40	33	+7	1.63	
6	Werder Bremen II	25	11	7	7	40	37	+3	1.60	
7	Holstein Kiel II	24	11	3	10	41	45	−4	1.50	
8	VfB Oldenburg	23	10	4	9	40	42	−2	1.48	
9	TSV Havelse	22	9	5	8	38	38	0	1.45	
10	Schwarz-Weiß Rehden	24	9	7	8	37	27	+10	1.42	
11	Lüneburger SK Hansa	22	8	3	11	33	40	−7	1.23	
12	Hannover 96 II	22	8	2	12	29	42	−13	1.18	
13	FC St. Pauli II	24	6	8	10	34	33	+1	1.08	
14	Hamburger SV II	22	6	5	11	37	35	+2	1.05	
15	SSV Jeddeloh	24	4	9	11	41	48	−7	0.88	
16	Altona 93	21	4	4	13	26	48	−22	0.76	
17	Heider SV	24	4	4	16	22	66	−44	0.67	
18	HSC Hannover	24	2	9	13	20	46	−26	0.63	

Source: kicker.de
Rules for classification: 1) Points; 2) Goal difference; 3) Goals scored
(C) Champions; (P) Promoted

== Regionalliga Nordost ==
18 teams from the states of Berlin, Brandenburg, Mecklenburg-Vorpommern, Saxony, Saxony-Anhalt and Thuringia competed in the eighth season of the reformed Regionalliga Nordost. FC Energie Cottbus was relegated from the 2018–19 3. Liga. SV Lichtenberg 47 was promoted from the 2018–19 NOFV-Oberliga Nord and BSG Chemie Leipzig was promoted from the 2018–19 NOFV-Oberliga Süd.

After the season's cancellation, the final standings were based on an average of points earned per matches played.

Pos	Team	Pld	W	D	L	GF	GA	GD	PPG	Qualification or relegation
1	1. FC Lokomotive Leipzig (C)	22	13	8	1	43	24	+19	2.14	Qualification for promotion play-offs
2	VSG Altglienicke	23	15	2	6	59	31	+28	2.04	
3	FC Energie Cottbus	23	13	6	4	53	32	+21	1.96	
4	Union Fürstenwalde	24	11	7	6	45	32	+13	1.67	
5	Hertha BSC II	23	12	2	9	59	42	+17	1.65	
6	BFC Dynamo	23	10	7	6	35	29	+6	1.61	
7	Berliner AK 07	22	9	6	7	47	35	+12	1.50	
8	FC Viktoria 1889 Berlin	21	6	11	4	20	17	+3	1.38	
9	VfB Auerbach	22	9	2	11	37	46	−9	1.32	
10	ZFC Meuselwitz	22	6	7	9	33	39	−6	1.14	
11	SV Lichtenberg 47	22	6	7	9	27	36	−9	1.14	
12	BSG Chemie Leipzig	23	4	11	8	20	26	−6	1.00	
13	Wacker Nordhausen (Note: Wacker Nordhausen was deducted nine points due to filing for insolvency. The club was voluntarily relegated to the NOFV-Oberliga at the end of the season.) (R)	20	8	4	8	44	36	+8	0.95	Relegation to NOFV-Oberliga
14	FSV Optik Rathenow	23	5	5	13	20	48	−28	0.87	
15	Germania Halberstadt	23	3	10	10	24	40	−16	0.83	
16	SV Babelsberg 03	22	3	8	11	22	38	−16	0.77	
17	Bischofswerdaer FV	20	2	5	13	16	53	−37	0.55	
18	FC Rot-Weiß Erfurt (Note: FC Rot-Weiß Erfurt was placed into administration on 29 January. Subsequently, all their results were expunged.) (R)	0	0	0	0	0	0	0	—	Relegation to NOFV-Oberliga

Source: kicker.de
Rules for classification: 1) Points; 2) Goal difference; 3) Goals scored
(C) Champions; (R) Relegated

== Regionalliga West ==
19 teams from North Rhine-Westphalia competed in the Regionalliga West. Sportfreunde Lotte and Fortuna Köln were relegated from the 2018–19 3. Liga. SV Bergisch Gladbach was promoted from the 2018–19 Mittelrheinliga, VfB Homberg was promoted from the 2018–19 Oberliga Niederrhein and Schalke 04 II and TuS Haltern were promoted from the 2018–19 Oberliga Westfalen.

After the season cancellation, the final standings were based on an average of points earned per matches played.

Pos	Team	Pld	W	D	L	GF	GA	GD	PPG	Qualification or relegation
1	SV Rödinghausen (Note: SV Rödinghausen did not apply for a 3. Liga license.) (C)	26	20	3	3	66	19	+47	2.42	Qualification for DFB-Pokal play-off
2	SC Verl (O, P)	22	16	5	1	51	14	+37	2.41	Qualification for promotion play-offs
3	Rot-Weiss Essen	24	16	3	5	43	25	+18	2.13	
4	Rot-Weiß Oberhausen	23	13	7	3	42	21	+21	2.00	
5	1. FC Köln II	23	10	5	8	39	29	+10	1.52	
6	Alemannia Aachen	24	9	8	7	41	34	+7	1.46	
7	Sportfreunde Lotte	22	9	4	9	35	33	+2	1.41	
8	Borussia Mönchengladbach II	24	10	3	11	47	46	+1	1.38	
9	Borussia Dortmund II	25	9	7	9	43	39	+4	1.36	
10	Fortuna Köln	22	8	5	9	19	26	−7	1.32	
11	Fortuna Düsseldorf II	24	8	6	10	36	40	−4	1.25	
12	Schalke 04 II	25	8	7	10	31	27	+4	1.24	
13	Wuppertaler SV	22	6	5	11	28	46	−18	1.05	
14	Bonner SC	25	7	4	14	28	43	−15	1.00	
15	TuS Haltern (Note: TuS Haltern was voluntarily relegated to the Oberliga.) (R)	23	6	5	12	28	47	−19	1.00	Relegation to Oberliga
16	SV Lippstadt	22	5	4	13	21	43	−22	0.86	
17	SV Bergisch Gladbach	23	4	3	16	17	53	−36	0.65	
18	VfB Homberg	25	4	4	17	21	51	−30	0.64	
19	SG Wattenscheid (Note: SG Wattenscheid was placed into administration on 23 October. Subsequently, all their results were expunged.) (R)	0	0	0	0	0	0	0	—	Relegation to Oberliga

Source: kicker.de
Rules for classification: 1) Points; 2) Goal difference; 3) Goals scored
(C) Champions; (O) Play-off winners; (P) Promoted; (R) Relegated

=== Westphalian DFB-Pokal play-off ===
As the Westphalian Football and Athletics Association is one of three regional associations with the most participating teams in their league competitions, they are allowed to enter a second team for the 2020–21 DFB-Pokal (in addition to the Westphalian Cup winners). A play-off is to take place between the best-placed eligible (non-reserve) Westphalian team of the Regionalliga West and the best-placed eligible team of the Oberliga Westfalen, with the winners qualifying for the DFB-Pokal.

25 August 2020
18:30 CEST

SC Wiedenbrück	4–0	SV Rödinghausen
Beckhoff 9'; Arkenberg 70' (o.g.); Lohmar 81' (pen.); Tabaku 87'	Report

Sportschule Kaiserau, Kamen
Referee: Thorben Siewer

== Regionalliga Südwest ==
18 teams from Baden-Württemberg, Hesse, Rhineland-Palatinate and Saarland competed in the eighth season of the Regionalliga Südwest. VfR Aalen was relegated from the 2018–19 3. Liga. Rot-Weiß Koblenz was promoted from the 2018–19 Oberliga Rheinland-Pfalz/Saar, Bahlinger SC was promoted from the 2018–19 Oberliga Baden-Württemberg and FC Gießen and Bayern Alzenau were promoted from the 2018–19 Hessenliga.

After the season cancellation, the final standings were based on an average of points earned per matches played.

Pos	Team	Pld	W	D	L	GF	GA	GD	PPG	Promotion
1	1. FC Saarbrücken (C, P)	23	18	1	4	52	18	+34	2.39	Promotion to 3. Liga
2	TSV Steinbach Haiger	22	15	3	4	40	18	+22	2.18	
3	SV Elversberg	23	15	4	4	48	24	+24	2.13	
4	FC 08 Homburg	23	14	4	5	42	30	+12	2.00	
5	Astoria Walldorf	23	10	7	6	41	31	+10	1.61	
6	Mainz 05 II	23	11	4	8	37	29	+8	1.61	
7	SSV Ulm	22	11	2	9	38	24	+14	1.59	
8	Kickers Offenbach	22	9	5	8	29	28	+1	1.45	
9	1899 Hoffenheim II	22	8	5	9	37	34	+3	1.32	
10	Bayern Alzenau	22	7	7	8	28	31	−3	1.27	
11	Bahlinger SC	23	8	4	11	33	38	−5	1.22	
12	FSV Frankfurt	23	7	7	9	26	32	−6	1.22	
13	SC Freiburg II	23	8	4	11	30	37	−7	1.22	
14	VfR Aalen	22	6	8	8	27	25	+2	1.18	
15	FC Gießen	23	6	7	10	22	39	−17	1.09	
16	FK Pirmasens	22	3	9	10	19	35	−16	0.82	
17	TSG Balingen	23	3	2	18	24	57	−33	0.48	
18	Rot-Weiß Koblenz	22	0	5	17	12	55	−43	0.23	

Source: kicker.de
Rules for classification: 1) Points; 2) Goal difference; 3) Goals scored
(C) Champions; (P) Promoted

== Regionalliga Bayern ==
18 teams from Bavaria competed in the eighth season of the Regionalliga Bayern. Türkgücü München and TSV Rain am Lech were promoted from the 2018–19 Bayernliga Süd and TSV Aubstadt was promoted from the 2018–19 Bayernliga Nord.

After the Bavarian association cancelled the 2020–21 season, which would have been the ninth for the Regionalliga Bayern, and enrolled Türkgücü München in the 3. Liga, the ongoing season had to resume without Türkgücü in September 2020 and conclude in mid-2021.

Pos	Team	Pld	W	D	L	GF	GA	GD	Pts	Promotion or qualification
1	Türkgücü München (P)	23	17	3	3	51	20	+31	54	Promotion to 2020–21 3. Liga
2	1. FC Schweinfurt	23	14	3	6	49	28	+21	45	Qualification to 2020–21 DFB-Pokal (Note: The DFB-Pokal spot was given to the top team of the league on 27 October 2020, after Türkgücü München had been removed from the table. Türkgücü appealed to the Munich district court (Landgericht München I) against the Bavarian Football Association's (BFV's) earlier decision to register 1. FC Schweinfurt for the competition as the representative of the Regionalliga Bayern instead of Türkgücü but was unsuccessful as the judgment of a Nuremberg arbitral tribunal was pronounced, confirming BFV's choice to register 1. FC Schweinfurt for the DFB-Pokal.)
3	1. FC Nürnberg II	23	12	7	4	51	27	+24	43	
4	SpVgg Bayreuth	23	11	8	4	48	27	+21	41	
5	Viktoria Aschaffenburg	23	11	5	7	45	29	+16	38	
6	VfB Eichstätt	23	10	7	6	41	23	+18	37	
7	Greuther Fürth II	23	10	5	8	29	25	+4	35	
8	TSV Buchbach	23	9	7	7	29	31	−2	34	
9	TSV Aubstadt	22	9	6	7	37	34	+3	33	
10	FC Augsburg II	23	7	8	8	38	34	+4	29	
11	Wacker Burghausen	23	7	5	11	28	33	−5	26	
12	FV Illertissen	23	7	4	12	33	48	−15	25	
13	TSV Rain am Lech	22	7	3	12	24	40	−16	24	
14	SV Heimstetten	23	7	2	14	37	52	−15	23	
15	SV Schalding-Heining	22	6	5	11	26	47	−21	23	
16	1860 Rosenheim	23	6	3	14	29	56	−27	21	
17	FC Memmingen	22	4	7	11	22	36	−14	19	
18	VfR Garching	21	4	4	13	23	50	−27	16	

Source: kicker.de
Rules for classification: 1) Points; 2) Goal difference; 3) Goals scored
(P) Promoted

== Promotion play-offs ==
The dates and the draw were announced on 12 June 2020. Due to the COVID-19 pandemic in Germany, the matches were played behind closed doors.

Team 1	Agg.	Team 2	1st leg	2nd leg
1. FC Lokomotive Leipzig	3–3 (a)	SC Verl	2–2	1–1

All times Central European Summer Time (UTC+2)

25 June 2020
17:00

1. FC Lokomotive Leipzig	2–2	SC Verl
Wolf 6'; Steinborn 56'	Report	Schikowski 45+1'; Guderitz 88' (o.g.)

Bruno-Plache-Stadion, Leipzig
Attendance: 0
Referee: Florian Badstübner
30 June 2020
16:00

SC Verl	1–1	1. FC Lokomotive Leipzig
Schallenberg 73'	Report	Stöckner 45' (o.g.)

SchücoArena, Bielefeld (Note: The match took place at the SchücoArena in Bielefeld instead of SC Verl's home stadium due to local restrictions in the Gütersloh district.)
Attendance: 0
Referee: Arne Aarnink

3–3 on aggregate. SC Verl won on away goals.
