= Mounir Bouziane =

French footballer (born 1991)

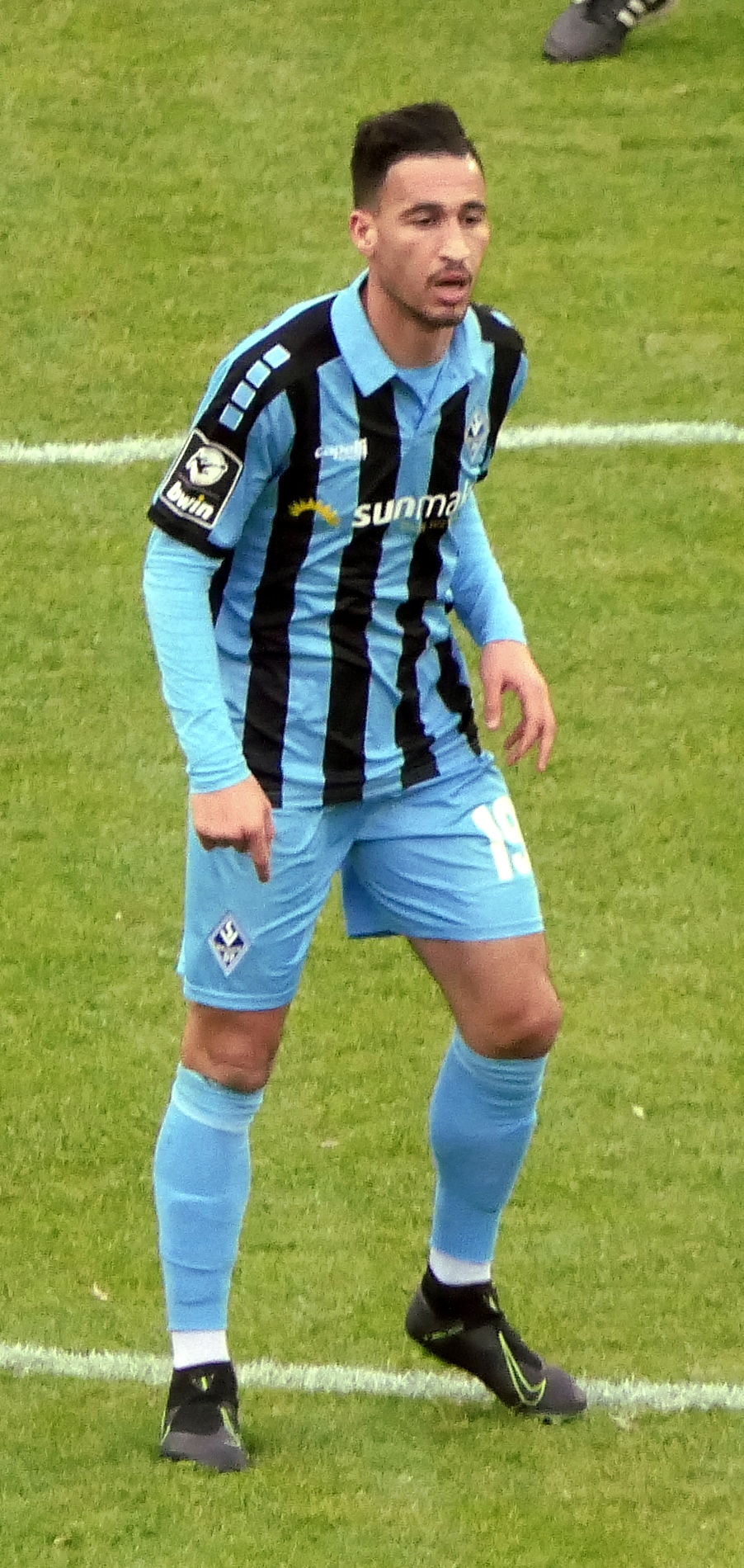
- Bouziane in 2019

Personal information
- Date of birth: 5 February 1991 (age 35)
- Place of birth: Saint-Louis, France
- Height: 1.82 m (6 ft 0 in)
- Position: Forward

Youth career
- 2003–2009: Strasbourg

Senior career*
Years	Team	Apps	(Gls)
2009–2013	SC Freiburg II	75	(20)
2013–2015	Mainz 05 II	64	(11)
2015–2016	Energie Cottbus	27	(1)
2016–2017	Mainz 05 II	32	(2)
2017	Mainz 05	1	(0)
2017–2018	Hansa Rostock	14	(0)
2018	Hansa Rostock II	3	(1)
2018–2020	Waldhof Mannheim	39	(8)
2020–2021	Türkgücü München	9	(1)
2022	FC Homburg	11	(2)
2023	Eintracht Trier	5	(0)
- * Club domestic league appearances and goals as of 1 July 2023

Mounir Bouziane (born 5 February 1991) is a French professional footballer who most recently played as a forward for Eintracht Trier.

== Career ==
Born in Saint-Louis, Haut-Rhin, Bouziane started his career with local club Saint-Louis Neuweg before joining the youth ranks of RC Strasbourg. In 2009, he made the switch to German football, joining SC Freiburg's reserve team in the Regionalliga. In 2013, Bouziane moved to Mainz 05 II, signing a one-year contract with the club. On 26 July 2014, he made his 3. Liga debut for Mainz, scoring a goal against Arminia Bielefeld in the opening match of the season.

On 22 January 2017, he made his Bundesliga debut for Mainz 05 in a 0–0 draw against 1. FC Köln, when he came on as a substitute for Jairo Samperio in the 77th minute.

== Personal life ==
Born in France, Bouziane is of Algerian descent. In summer 2022 he married German footballer Chiara Bouziane (née Loos).

== Career statistics ==
As of match played 1 July 2023

Appearances and goals by club, season and competition
Club	Season	League			National cup		Other		Total	
Club	Season	Division	Apps	Goals	Apps	Goals	Apps	Goals	Apps	Goals
Freiburg II	2009–10	Regionalliga Südwest	2	0	—		—		2	0
Freiburg II	2010–11	Regionalliga Südwest	16	3	—		—		16	3
Freiburg II	2011–12	Regionalliga Südwest	26	6	—		—		26	6
Freiburg II	2012–13	Regionalliga Südwest	31	11	—		—		31	11
Freiburg II	Total		75	20	0	0	0	0	75	20
Mainz 05 II	2013–14	Regionalliga Südwest	32	6	—		—		32	6
Mainz 05 II	2014–15	3. Liga	32	5	—		—		32	5
Mainz 05 II	Total		64	11	0	0	0	0	64	11
Energie Cottbus	2015–16	3. Liga	27	1	1	0	—		28	1
Mainz 05 II	2016–17	3. Liga	32	2	—		—		32	2
Mainz 05	2016–17	Bundesliga	1	0	0	0	0	0	1	0
Hansa Rostock	2017–18	3. Liga	14	0	1	0	—		15	0
Hansa Rostock II	2017–18	NOFV-Oberliga Nord	3	1	–		—		3	1
Waldhof Mannheim	2018–19	Regionalliga Südwest	13	3	0	0	—		13	3
Waldhof Mannheim	2019–20	3. Liga	26	5	0	0	—		26	5
Waldhof Mannheim	Total		39	8	0	0	0	0	39	8
Türkgücü München	2020–21	3. Liga	9	1	0	0	—		9	1
FC Homburg	2021–22	Regionalliga Südwest	11	2	0	0	—		11	2
Eintracht Trier	2022–23	Regionalliga Südwest	5	0	0	0	—		5	0
Career total			180	46	2	0	0	0	182	46
