= Leon Kern =

German footballer

Personal information
- Date of birth: 22 April 1997 (age 29)
- Place of birth: Germany
- Height: 1.82 m (6 ft 0 in)
- Position: Forward

Team information
- Current team: TSV Schott Mainz
- Number: 29

Youth career
- –2012: TuS Koblenz
- 2012–2016: Mainz 05

Senior career*
| Years | Team | Apps | (Gls) |
| 2016–2017 | Mainz 05 II | 4 | (0) |
| 2017– | TSV Schott Mainz | 11 | (0) |

International career
| 2013 | Germany U16 | 4 | (3) |
| 2013 | Germany U17 | 3 | (1) |
- * Club domestic league appearances and goals as of 19 November 2017

Leon Kern (born 22 April 1997) is a German footballer who plays as a forward for TSV Schott Mainz.
