= Gortler =

Gortler or Görtler may refer to:

== People ==
- Daniel Gortler, an Israeli pianist
- Katherine Walker, née Katharina Görtler, a German-American lighthouse keeper
- Lukas Görtler (born 1994), a German football player
- Nicolas Görtler (born 1990), a German football player

== Mathematics ==
- Görtler vortices, a concept in fluid dynamics
