= Tim Müller =

German-Austrian footballer

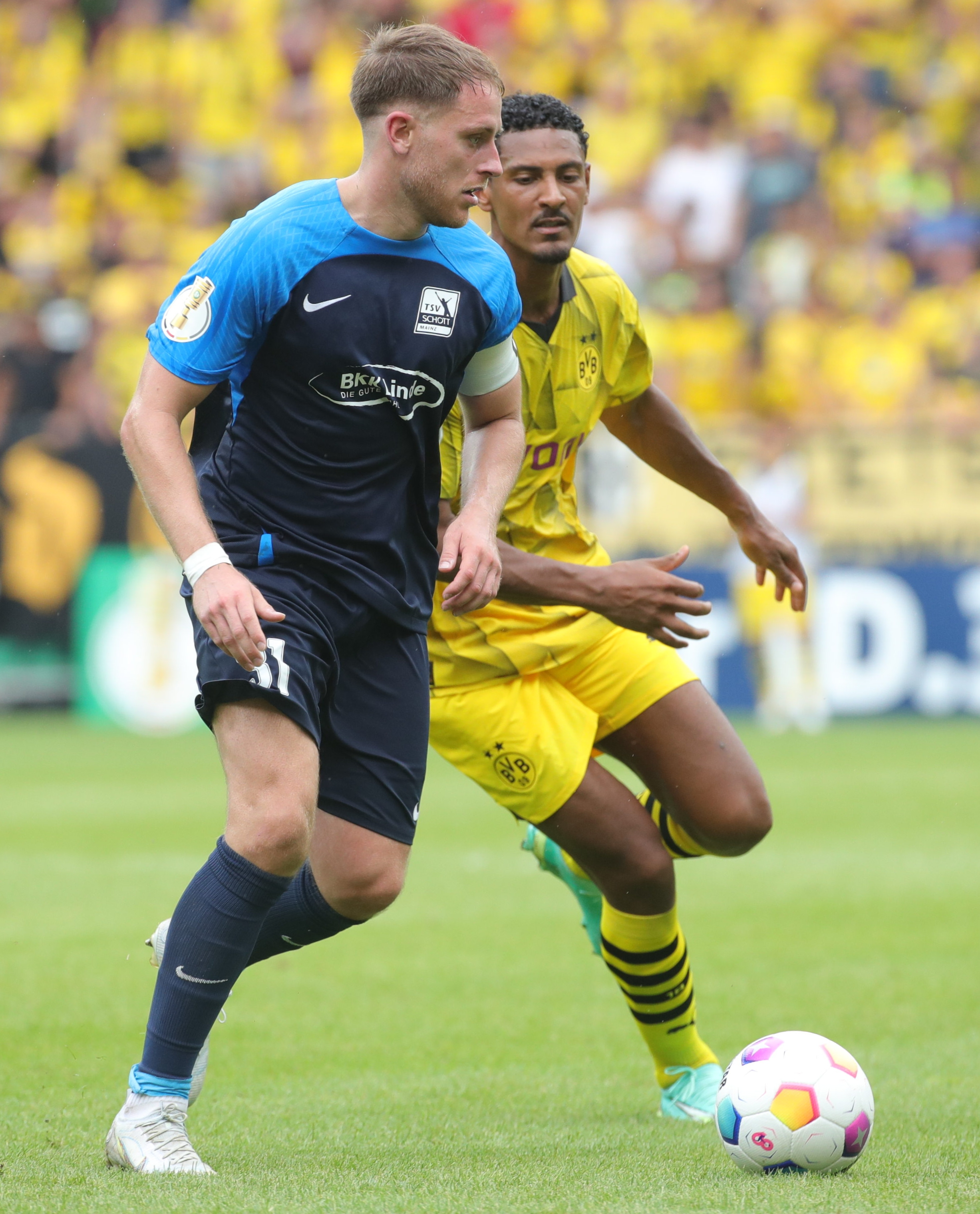
- Müller with Sébastien Haller (2023)

Personal information
- Full name: Tim Müller
- Date of birth: 4 August 1996 (age 30)
- Place of birth: Mainz, Germany
- Height: 1.78 m (5 ft 10 in)
- Position: Midfielder

Team information
- Current team: Schott Mainz
- Number: 31

Youth career
- 2002–2008: Fontana Finthen
- 2008–2015: Mainz 05

Senior career*
Years	Team	Apps	(Gls)
2015–2017	Mainz 05 II	27	(0)
2017–2019	TSV Steinbach	52	(5)
2019–	Schott Mainz	15	(1)
- * Club domestic league appearances and goals as of 17:26, 21 January 2021 (UTC)

Tim Müller (born 4 August 1996) is a German-Austrian footballer who plays as a midfielder for TSV Schott Mainz.
