= Patrick Huth =

German footballer

Personal information
- Full name: Patrick Klaus Huth
- Date of birth: 25 July 1995 (age 31)
- Place of birth: Germany
- Height: 1.81 m (5 ft 11 in)
- Position: Attacking midfielder

Team information
- Current team: FC Eddersheim
- Number: 9

Youth career
- –2010: Mainz 05
- 2010–2014: TSV Schott Mainz

Senior career*
Years	Team	Apps	(Gls)
2014–2016	TSV Schott Mainz	61	(17)
2016–2017	Mainz 05 II	7	(0)
2018	TSV Schott Mainz	11	(0)
2018	FV Kastel 06	12	(7)
2019–2021	TuS Marienborn	32	(19)
2021–2023	TSG Pfeddersheim	32	(8)
2023	SV Rot-Weiß Hadamar	11	(4)
2023–	FC Eddersheim	3	(0)
- * Club domestic league appearances and goals as of 27 July 2024

Patrick Klaus Huth (born 25 July 1995) is a German footballer who plays as a midfielder for FC Eddersheim.
