= Dorow =

Dorow is a surname. Notable people with the surname include:

- Al Dorow (1929–2009), American gridiron football quarterback
- Dorothy Dorow (1930–2017), English operatic soprano
- Jan-Lucas Dorow (born 1993), German footballer
- Ryan Dorow (born 1995), American professional baseball infielder
- Tracey Dorow, American basketball coach
