= Ihrig =

Ihrig is a surname of German origin. According to the 2010 United States Census, Ihrig is the 22235th most common surname in the United States, belonging to 1160 individuals. Ihrig is most common among White (99.48%) individuals. People named Ihrig include:

- Stefan Ihrig, historian
- Sebestyén Ihrig-Farkas (b. 1994), Hungarian footballer
- Tevin Ihrig, German footballer
