= Malte Moos =

German footballer

Personal information
- Full name: Malte Tobias Moos
- Date of birth: 2 February 1996 (age 30)
- Place of birth: Mainz, Germany
- Height: 1.69 m (5 ft 7 in)
- Position: Right-back

Team information
- Current team: Astoria Walldorf (loan)
- Number: 28

Youth career
- –2015: Maniz 05

Senior career*
Years	Team	Apps	(Gls)
2014–2018	Mainz 05 II	48	(0)
2018–2019	Wormatia Worms	31	(0)
2019–	Stuttgarter Kickers	85	(7)
2023–	→ Astoria Walldorf (loan)	13	(0)
- * Club domestic league appearances and goals as of 30 April 2024

Malte Tobias Moos (born 2 February 1996) is a German footballer who plays as a right-back for Astoria Walldorf, on loan from Stuttgarter Kickers.
