= Jan Just =

German footballer

Personal information
- Date of birth: 14 September 1996 (age 30)
- Place of birth: Mainz, Germany
- Height: 1.90 m (6 ft 3 in)
- Position: Defender

Team information
- Current team: TSV Schott Mainz
- Number: 24

Youth career
- –2013: Mainz 05
- 2013–2015: 1. FC Kaiserslautern

Senior career*
Years	Team	Apps	(Gls)
2015–2016	Wormatia Worms	9	(0)
2016–2018	TSV Schott Mainz	62	(6)
2018–2022	Waldhof Mannheim	27	(2)
2021–2022	Waldhof Mannheim II	14	(1)
2022–2023	VfR Aalen	22	(2)
2023–	TSV Schott Mainz	76	(9)
- * Club domestic league appearances and goals as of 26 June 2026

Jan Just (born 14 September 1996) is a German professional footballer who plays as a defender for TSV Schott Mainz.
