= Noah Korczowski =

German footballer

Personal information
- Date of birth: 8 January 1994 (age 32)
- Place of birth: Marl, Germany
- Height: 1.88 m (6 ft 2 in)
- Position: Defender

Team information
- Current team: TSV Meerbusch
- Number: 18

Youth career
- 1998–2003: TSV Marl-Hüls
- 2003–2005: VfL Drewer
- 2005–2006: SG Herten-Langenbochum
- 2006–2012: FC Schalke 04
- 2012–2013: 1. FC Nürnberg

Senior career*
Years	Team	Apps	(Gls)
2012–2014	1. FC Nürnberg II	33	(0)
2012–2014	1. FC Nürnberg	3	(0)
2014–2016	VfL Wolfsburg II	45	(1)
2016–2018	Mainz 05 II	43	(1)
2018–2019	SG Wattenscheid 09	20	(0)
2019	Rot-Weiss Essen	10	(0)
2019–2021	TuS Haltern	24	(2)
2021–2024	TVD Velbert	74	(2)
2024–	TSV Meerbusch	0	(0)

International career
2011	Germany U17	5	(0)
2012–2013	Germany U19	3	(0)
- * Club domestic league appearances and goals as of 2 June 2024

Noah Korczowski (born 8 January 1994) is a German footballer who plays as a defender for Oberliga Niederrhein club TSV Meerbusch.

== Career ==
In 1998 Korczowski started playing soccer in his home town at TSV Marl-Hüls, and in 2003 he moved to another district at VfL Drewer. After two years, he went to the neighboring town Herten in the SG Langenbochum. In 2006, he finally switched to FC Schalke 04. From there, he was nominated for various youth national teams of the DFB and also made four appearances at the U-17 World Cup 2011 in Mexico, most recently in the match for third place, which Germany won against Brazil. He won the German U-19 championship with Schalke 04. After finishing first in Group West with Schalke, he played against Bayern Munich in the final. For the 2012–13 season, Korczowski was defeated by Bundesliga club 1. FC Nürnberg. He made his first appearance there on 21 July 2021 in the farewell game for Marek Mintál, when he came on in the 85th minute.

From then on, he played with the second team in the Regionalliga Bayern. On 3 November 2012, he finally made his first professional appearance in a home win against VfL Wolfsburg; he was substituted in the 87th minute. On 30 January 2014, Korczowski moved to VfL Wolfsburg II. His contract ran until 30 June 2016. For the 2016–17 season he moved to Mainz 05 II in the 3. Liga. With the Mainz reserve team, he was relegated to the Regionalliga Südwest. For the 2018–19 season, he moved to SG Wattenscheid 09 in the Regionalliga West. During the winter break, he switched to league rivals Rot-Weiss Essen. After half a year, he also left RWE again and joined the regional league TuS Haltern.
