= Maximilian Rossmann =

German footballer

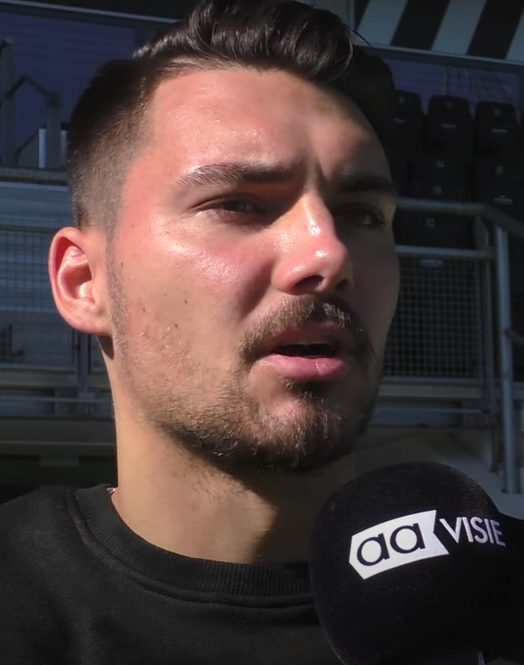
- Rossmann in 2019

Personal information
- Full name: Maximilian Christian Rossmann
- Date of birth: 6 May 1995 (age 31)
- Place of birth: Halberstadt, Germany
- Height: 1.92 m (6 ft 4 in)
- Position: Centre back

Team information
- Current team: Kickers Offenbach
- Number: 3

Youth career
- Leu Braunschweig
- –2008: Eintracht Braunschweig
- 2008–2014: VfL Wolfsburg

Senior career*
Years	Team	Apps	(Gls)
2014–2016	VfL Wolfsburg II	6	(0)
2016	Alemannia Aachen	15	(0)
2016–2017	Mainz 05 II	29	(2)
2017–2018	Sportfreunde Lotte	19	(1)
2018–2020	Heracles Almelo	37	(3)
2020–2022	Viktoria Köln	47	(2)
2022–	Kickers Offenbach	37	(1)
- * Club domestic league appearances and goals as of 26 June 2026

Maximilian Christian Rossmann (born 6 May 1995) is a German professional footballer who plays centre back for Kickers Offenbach.
