= Bilal Kamarieh =

German footballer

Personal information
- Full name: Bilal Kamarieh
- Date of birth: 14 August 1996 (age 30)
- Place of birth: Berlin, Germany
- Height: 1.82 m (6 ft 0 in)
- Position: Left winger

Youth career
- 2000–2014: Hertha BSC
- 2014–2015: Mainz 05

Senior career*
Years	Team	Apps	(Gls)
2014	Hertha BSC II	9	(0)
2015–2017	Mainz 05 II	4	(0)
2017	Hertha Zehlendorf	3	(0)
2018	Brandenburger SC	5	(0)
- * Club domestic league appearances and goals as of 16:38, 27 August 2019 (UTC)

Bilal Kamarieh (born 14 August 1996) is a German footballer of Lebanese descent who most recently played for Brandenburger SC Süd 05.
