= Marco Aulbach =

German footballer

Personal information
- Date of birth: 25 July 1993 (age 33)
- Place of birth: Aschaffenburg, Germany
- Height: 1.91 m (6 ft 3 in)
- Position: Goalkeeper

Youth career
- –2008: 1860 München
- 2008–2011: SC Freiburg

Senior career*
Years	Team	Apps	(Gls)
2012–2013	Wacker Burghausen	1	(0)
2013–2014	Eintracht Frankfurt II	7	(0)
2013–2014	Eintracht Frankfurt	0	(0)
2014–2016	Preußen Münster	1	(0)
2015	→ Preußen Münster II	1	(0)
2016–2017	Mainz 05 II	1	(0)
2017–2020	FSV Frankfurt	80	(0)
- * Club domestic league appearances and goals

Marco Aulbach (born 25 July 1993) is a German former footballer who played as a goalkeeper.
