= Charmaine Häusl =

Seychellois footballer (born 1996)

Personal information
- Full name: Charmaine Laurence Häusl
- Date of birth: 27 January 1996 (age 30)
- Place of birth: Victoria, Seychelles
- Height: 1.86 m (6 ft 1 in)
- Positions: Defensive midfielder; centre-back

Team information
- Current team: BFC Preussen
- Number: 21

Youth career
- SC Olching
- 1860 Munich
- SC Fürstenfeldbruck
- FC Augsburg
- –2015: Mainz 05

Senior career*
| Years | Team | Apps | (Gls) |
| 2015–2019 | Mainz 05 II | 82 | (3) |
| 2019–2020 | Sonnenhof Großaspach | 4 | (0) |
| 2020–2022 | Berliner AK | 17 | (0) |
| 2022–2023 | VSG Altglienicke | 8 | (0) |
| 2024 | SV Lichtenberg 47 | 9 | (0) |
| 2024–2025 | Babelsberg | 26 | (0) |
| 2025– | BFC Preussen | 30 | (3) |

International career^{‡}
| 2012–2013 | Germany U17 | 5 | (1) |
| 2019– | Seychelles | 6 | (0) |
- * Club domestic league appearances and goals as of 23 September 2026 ‡ National team caps and goals as of 22 June 2026

Charmaine Laurence Häusl (born 27 January 1996) is a Seychellois professional footballer who plays as a defensive midfielder or centre-back for Regionalliga Nordost club BFC Preussen and the Seychelles national team.

== International career ==
Born in the Seychelles to a German father and a Seychellois mother, Häusl is a youth international for Germany.
