= Devante Parker =

German footballer (born 1996)

Personal information
- Full name: Devante James Parker
- Date of birth: 16 March 1996 (age 30)
- Place of birth: Wiesbaden, Germany
- Height: 1.75 m (5 ft 9 in)
- Position: Winger

Youth career
- FC Bierstadt
- –2006: FV Biebrich 02
- 2006–2014: Mainz 05

Senior career*
Years	Team	Apps	(Gls)
2014–2020	Mainz 05 II	96	(14)
2014–2020	Mainz 05	2	(0)
2017–2018	→ St. Pölten (loan)	7	(0)
Total		105	(14)

International career
2011	Germany U15	2	(0)
2011–2012	Germany U16	4	(1)
2012–2013	Germany U17	11	(2)
2014–2015	Germany U19	6	(1)
- * Club domestic league appearances and goals

Devante Parker (born 16 March 1996) is a German former professional footballer who played as a winger. He represented Germany internationally at various youth levels up to U19.

== Club career ==
Parker began his career in the academy of Mainz 05. He made his Bundesliga debut on 31 August 2014 against Hannover 96 replacing Koo Ja-cheol after 82 minutes in a 0–0 draw. He spent the 2016–17 season playing for the club's reserves scoring 1 goal in 20 appearances.

In July 2017, Parker joined Austrian Bundesliga side SKN St. Pölten on loan for the 2017–18 season. His loan was cut short by a cruciate ligament tear.

In July 2020 Parker announced his retirement from playing. He was unable to regain professional fitness after a second cruciate ligament tear.

== Personal life ==
He is the younger brother of Shawn Parker, who also is a professional footballer.

== Career statistics ==
Appearances and goals by club, season and competition
Club	Season	League			Cup		Other		Total	
Club	Season	Division	Apps	Goals	Apps	Goals	Apps	Goals	Apps	Goals
Mainz 05 II	2013–14	Regionalliga Südwest	2	1	—		1 (Note: Appearance in the Regionalliga Promotion Playoff.)	1	3	2
Mainz 05 II	2014–15	3. Liga	29	2	—		—		29	2
Mainz 05 II	2015–16	3. Liga	35	6	—		—		35	6
Mainz 05 II	2014–15	3. Liga	20	1	—		—		20	1
Mainz 05 II	2018–19	Regionalliga Südwest	8	3	—		—		8	3
Mainz 05 II	Total		94	13	—		1	1	95	14
Mainz 05	2014–15	Bundesliga	1	0	0	0	—		2	0
Mainz 05	2015–16	Bundesliga	1	0	0	0	—		1	0
Mainz 05	Total		2	0	0	0	—		2	0
SKN St. Pölten (loan)	2017–18	Austrian Bundesliga	7	0	0	0	—		7	0
Career total			103	13	0	0	1	1	104	14
