= Aaron Seydel =

German footballer (born 1996)

Personal information
- Date of birth: 7 February 1996 (age 30)
- Place of birth: Langen, Germany
- Height: 1.99 m (6 ft 6 in)
- Position: Striker

Youth career
- FSV 1945 Oppenheim
- –2015: Mainz 05

Senior career*
Years	Team	Apps	(Gls)
2015–2020	Mainz 05 II	53	(8)
2016–2020	Mainz 05	6	(1)
2017–2018	→ Holstein Kiel (loan)	25	(2)
2018–2019	→ Holstein Kiel (loan)	6	(2)
2020	→ Jahn Regensburg (loan)	9	(1)
2020–2024	Darmstadt 98	64	(9)
2025–2026	AaB	6	(1)

International career^{‡}
2011	Germany U15	2	(0)
2011–2012	Germany U16	3	(0)
2013–2014	Germany U18	3	(1)
2014	Germany U19	1	(0)
2017–2018	Germany U21	4	(4)
- * Club domestic league appearances and goals as of 2 September 2025 ‡ National team caps and goals as of 11 September 2018

Aaron Seydel (born 7 February 1996) is a German professional footballer who plays as a striker for Danish Superliga club AaB.

== Career ==
Seydel, born to a Ghanaian father and a German mother, is a youth exponent from Mainz 05. He made his league debut with Mainz 05 II on 1 June 2014 against TSG Neustrelitz.

He made his Bundesliga debut for Mainz 05 on 27 November 2016 when he started a game against Hertha BSC and opened scoring in the 25th minute, Mainz eventually lost the game 2–1.

On 24 August 2017, Seydel was loaned to Holstein Kiel until 2018.

On 8 August 2018, he returned to Holstein Kiel on a loan deal until the end of 2018–19 season.

On 11 January 2020, Seydel was loaned to SSV Jahn Regensburg until the end of 2019–20 season.

On 6 August 2020, Seydel signed with Darmstadt 98 on a two-year contract. In May 2022, his contract was extended until summer 2024.

On 12 May 2024, Darmstadt 98 announced that he and several other players will leave the club after this season.

After a week of trial, Danish Superliga club AaB confirmed that Seydel joined the club on a deal until June 2026.
