= Petar Slišković =

Croatian footballer

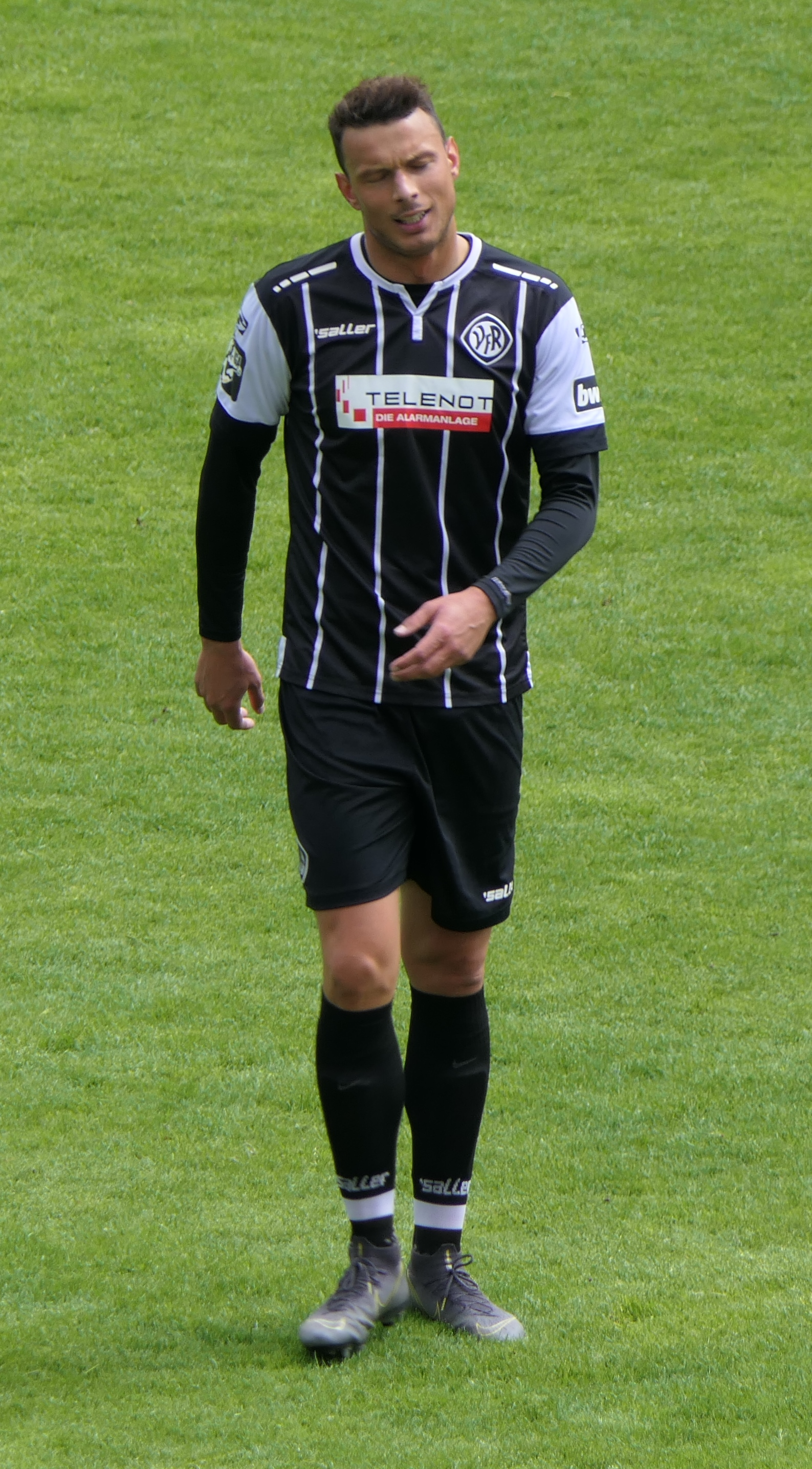
- Slišković with VfR Aalen in 2019

Personal information
- Date of birth: 21 February 1991 (age 35)
- Place of birth: Sarajevo, SFR Yugoslavia
- Height: 1.93 m (6 ft 4 in)
- Position: Forward

Team information
- Current team: Gostivari
- Number: 33

Youth career
- NK Kiseljak
- –2007: DJK SW Griesheim
- 2007–2008: FSV Frankfurt
- 2008–2010: Mainz 05

Senior career*
Years	Team	Apps	(Gls)
2010–2015	Mainz 05 II	73	(53)
2011–2015	Mainz 05	15	(2)
2011–2012	→ FC St. Pauli (loan)	9	(0)
2012–2013	→ Dynamo Dresden (loan)	9	(0)
2015–2016	FC Aarau	27	(4)
2016	Stuttgarter Kickers	9	(0)
2016–2018	Hallescher FC	20	(4)
2017	→ Mainz 05 II (loan)	15	(6)
2018–2019	Viktoria Berlin	15	(1)
2019	VfR Aalen	16	(6)
2019–2020	MSV Duisburg	26	(1)
2020–2022	Türkgücü München	47	(2)
2022	SV Wehen Wiesbaden	12	(0)
2022–2023	Chennaiyin	17	(8)
2023	Jamshedpur	0	(0)
2024	Gostivari	5	(1)

International career
2010–2011	Croatia U21	6	(0)
- * Club domestic league appearances and goals as of 1 June 2024

Petar Slišković (born 21 February 1991) is a Bosnian-born Croatian professional footballer who plays as a forward.

== Career ==
A product of FSV Frankfurt's youth academy, Slišković made his professional debut on 29 January 2011 for Mainz 05 against 1. FC Kaiserslautern. On 31 August 2011, Slišković was loaned to second division side St. Pauli., and a year later he joined Dynamo Dresden on a season-long loan. He returned to Mainz in January 2013, six months early.

In February 2015, he left Mainz for good and joined Swiss Super League side FC Aarau on a one-and-a-half-year deal until 2016.

He moved to MSV Duisburg for the 2019–20 season. A year later, he signed for Türkgücü München.

On 17 January 2022, Slišković signed a 1.5-year contract with SV Wehen Wiesbaden.

=== Chennaiyin ===
In July 2022, Slišković moved to Indian Super League club Chennaiyin on a one-year deal.

On 20 August, he made his debut against Army Red in the 2022 Durand Cup, which ended in a 2–2 draw. On 1 September, his scored his first two goals for the club against TRAU in the Durand Cup, which ended in a 4–1 win. On 11 September, he scored a header against Mumbai City in the quarter-finals of the Durand Cup, in a 5–3 loss.

=== Jamshedpur ===
Slišković moved to fellow Indian Super League side Jamshedpur on 19 May 2023 on an free transfer.

== Career statistics ==
=== Club ===
As of 7 February 2023

Appearances and goals by club, season and competition
Club	Season	League			Cup		Continental		Total	
Club	Season	Division	Apps	Goals	Apps	Goals	Apps	Goals	Apps	Goals
Mainz 05	2009–10	Bundesliga	0	0	—		—		0	0
Mainz 05	2010–11	Bundesliga	9	2	—		—		9	2
Mainz 05	2011–12	Bundesliga	1	0	1 (Note: Appearance(s) in DFB-Pokal)	1	1 (Note: Appearance(s) in UEFA Europa League)	0	3	1
Mainz 05	2012–13	Bundesliga	1	0	—		—		1	0
Mainz 05	2013–14	Bundesliga	2	0	—		—		2	0
Mainz 05	2014–15	Bundesliga	2	0	—		—		2	0
Mainz 05	Total		15	2	1	1	1	0	17	2
Mainz 05 II	2009–10	Regionalliga	5	1	—		—		5	1
Mainz 05 II	2010–11	Regionalliga	17	12	—		—		17	12
Mainz 05 II	2012–13	Regionalliga	17	14	—		—		17	14
Mainz 05 II	2013–14	Regionalliga	26	23	—		—		26	23
Mainz 05 II	2014–15	3. Liga	8	3	—		—		8	3
Mainz 05 II	Total		73	53	0	0	0	0	73	53
FC St. Pauli (loan)	2011–12	2. Bundesliga	9	0	—		—		9	0
Dynamo Dresden (loan)	2012–13	2. Bundesliga	9	0	—		—		9	0
FC Aarau	2014–15	Swiss Super League	15	3	1 (Note: Appearance(s) in Swiss Cup)	0	—		16	3
FC Aarau	2015–16	Swiss Challenge League	12	1	2	1	—		14	2
FC Aarau	Total		27	4	3	1	0	0	30	5
Stuttgarter Kickers	2015–16	3. Liga	9	0	—		—		9	0
Hallescher FC	2016–17	3. Liga	10	0	—		—		10	0
Hallescher FC	2017–18	3. Liga	10	4	—		—		10	4
Hallescher FC	Total		20	4	0	0	0	0	20	4
Mainz 05 II (loan)	2016–17	3. Liga	15	6	—		—		15	6
Viktoria Berlin	2018–19	Regionalliga	15	9	—		—		15	9
VfR Aalen	2018–19	3. Liga	16	6	—		—		16	6
MSV Duisburg	2019–20	3. Liga	26	4	1	0	—		27	4
Türkgücü München	2020–21	3. Liga	29	13	—		5 (Note: Appearance(s) in Bayernpokal)	1	34	14
Türkgücü München	2021–22	3. Liga	18	3	1	0	2	2	21	3
Türkgücü München	Total		47	16	1	0	7	3	55	17
SV Wehen Wiesbaden	2021–22	3. Liga	12	0	—		—		12	0
Chennaiyin	2022–23	Indian Super League	17	8	5 (Note: Appearance(s) in Durand Cup)	3	—		22	11
Jamshedpur	2023–24	Indian Super League	0	0	0	0	—		0	0
Career total			310	112	11	5	8	3	329	120
