= Benjamin Trümner =

German footballer

Personal information
- Full name: Benjamin Trümner
- Date of birth: 17 May 1995 (age 31)
- Place of birth: Schwalmstadt, Germany
- Height: 1.70 m (5 ft 7 in)
- Position: Midfielder

Team information
- Current team: SG Barockstadt
- Number: 11

Youth career
- 1. FC Schwalmstadt
- –2012: SC Neukirchen
- 2012–2013: Hessen Kassel
- 2013–2014: 1899 Hoffenheim

Senior career*
Years	Team	Apps	(Gls)
2013	Hessen Kassel	1	(0)
2014–2016	1899 Hoffenheim II	53	(17)
2016–2018	Mainz 05 II	44	(4)
2018–	SG Barockstadt	9	(0)

International career
2012–2013	Germany U18	4	(0)
2013–2014	Germany U19	7	(0)
2014–2015	Germany U20	2	(0)
- * Club domestic league appearances and goals as of 24 October 2018

Benjamin Trümner (born 17 May 1995) is a German footballer who plays as a midfielder for SG Barockstadt in the Hessenliga.

== Honours ==
=== International ===
Germany

- UEFA European Under-19 Championship: 2014
