= Max Barnofsky =

German footballer

Personal information
- Full name: Max Rico Barnofsky
- Date of birth: 5 March 1995 (age 31)
- Place of birth: Berlin, Germany
- Height: 1.91 m (6 ft 3 in)
- Position: Defender

Youth career
- 2001–2003: DJK Schwarz-Weiß Neukölln
- 2003–2009: BFC Preussen
- 2009–2013: Hertha Zehlendorf
- 2013–2014: Hallescher FC

Senior career*
Years	Team	Apps	(Gls)
2013–2015	Hallescher FC II	11	(0)
2015–2018	Hallescher FC	53	(0)
2018–2019	Carpi	0	(0)
2019–2020	Gozzano	7	(0)
2020	FC Messina	0	(0)
2020–2022	Cittanova Interpiana	0	(0)
- * Club domestic league appearances and goals as of 29 May 2025

Max Rico Barnofsky (born 5 March 1995) is a German footballer who plays as a defender.

== Career ==
On 2 July 2018, he moved to Italy, joining Serie B club Carpi on a one-year contract with additional two-year extension option.

On 11 July 2019, he joined Gozzano.

On 1 July 2020, he moved to FC Messina.
