= Jamil Dem =

German footballer (born 1993)

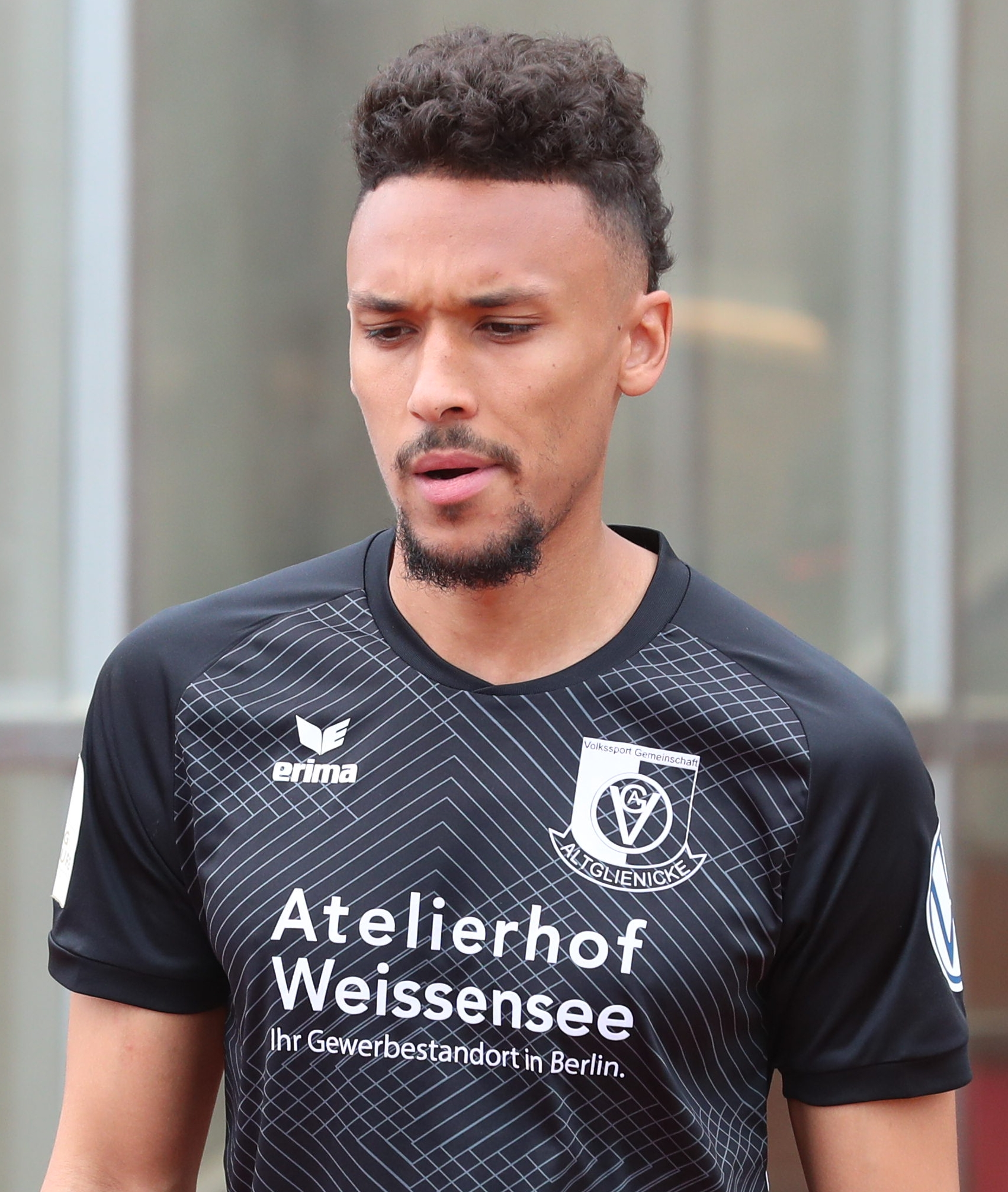

Personal information
- Full name: Raphael Jamil Dem
- Date of birth: March 9, 1993 (age 33)
- Place of birth: Berlin, Germany
- Height: 1.82 m (5 ft 11 1/2 in)
- Position: Defender

Team information
- Current team: BFC Preussen
- Number: 20

Youth career
- Lichterfelder FC
- –2011: Tennis Borussia Berlin
- 2011–2012: Hertha Zehlendorf

Senior career*
Years	Team	Apps	(Gls)
2012–2015	Hertha BSC II	62	(8)
2015–2018	Chemnitzer FC	50	(5)
2018–2020	Sonnenhof Großaspach	21	(0)
2020–2023	VSG Altglienicke	22	(0)
2024	VSG Altglienicke	9	(0)
2025–	BFC Preussen	21	(1)
- * Club domestic league appearances and goals as of 9 October 2025

Raphael Jamil Dem (born March 9, 1993) is a German footballer who plays as a defender for BFC Preussen.

== Personal life ==
Dem is of Senegalese descent through his father.
