= Fatih Candan =

Turkish-German footballer

Personal information
- Date of birth: 30 December 1989 (age 36)
- Place of birth: Essen, West Germany
- Height: 1.80 m (5 ft 11 in)
- Position: Forward

Team information
- Current team: VfB Bottrop

Youth career
- –2010: TGD Essen-West

Senior career*
Years	Team	Apps	(Gls)
2010–2012	Rot-Weiß Oberhausen	6	(0)
2012–2015	Viktoria Köln	79	(40)
2015–2016	Karabükspor	9	(1)
2016–2017	Viktoria Köln	39	(11)
2017–2019	TSV Steinbach	60	(18)
2019–2021	Schalke 04 II	53	(8)
2021–	VfB Bottrop	0	(0)
- * Club domestic league appearances and goals as of 13 July 2021

Fatih Candan (born 30 December 1989) is a Turkish-German footballer who plays for VfB Bottrop.

He was born in Essen and lives in nearby Bottrop.
