= Nicolas Görtler =

German footballer

Personal information
- Date of birth: 8 March 1990 (age 36)
- Place of birth: Bamberg, Germany
- Height: 1.83 m (6 ft 0 in)
- Position: Forward

Youth career
- –2005: SC Kemmern
- 2005–2009: Eintracht Bamberg

Senior career*
Years	Team	Apps	(Gls)
2009–2011	Eintracht Bamberg	39	(20)
2011–2012	FC Nürnberg II	41	(17)
2012–2013	Wehen Wiesbaden	5	(0)
2013–2016	Eintracht Bamberg	89	(41)
2016–2019	Schweinfurt 05	56	(13)
2019–2020	Eintracht Bamberg	15	(4)
- * Club domestic league appearances and goals as of 18:32, 14 August 2021 (UTC)

Nicolas Görtler (born 8 March 1990) is a German footballer who plays as a forward.

== Career ==
Görtler began his career with Eintracht Bamberg, making 19 appearances in the 2009–10 season as the club were relegated from the Regionalliga Süd. He scored 17 goals in the first half of the following season in the Bayernliga before returning to the Regionalliga Süd in January 2011 to sign for 1. FC Nürnberg II. 18 months later he signed for SV Wehen Wiesbaden of the 3. Liga, making his debut as a substitute for Lars Guenther in a 3–2 defeat against Chemnitzer FC. He returned to Eintracht Bamberg in July 2013 and scored 21 goals in his first season back with the club to finish as top scorer of the Regionalliga Bayern.
