= Daniel Bohl =

German footballer (born 1994)

Personal information
- Date of birth: 9 June 1994 (age 32)
- Place of birth: Einöd, Germany
- Height: 1.72 m (5 ft 8 in)
- Position: Midfielder

Team information
- Current team: TSV Schott Mainz
- Number: 4

Youth career
- SpVgg Einöd
- –2010: 1. FC Saarbrücken
- 2010–2013: 1. FSV Mainz 05

Senior career*
Years	Team	Apps	(Gls)
2013–2017	1. FSV Mainz 05 II	119	(7)
2017–2019	Hallescher FC	22	(1)
2019	Energie Cottbus	15	(1)
2019–2020	Chemnitzer FC	21	(1)
2020–2024	FK Pirmasens	104	(7)
2024–	TSV Schott Mainz	49	(7)

International career
2010	Germany U16	1	(0)
2010	Germany U17	1	(0)
2011–2012	Germany U18	8	(1)
2012–2013	Germany U19	9	(0)
- * Club domestic league appearances and goals as of 26 June 2026

Daniel Bohl (born 9 June 1994) is a German professional footballer who plays as a midfielder for TSV Schott Mainz.

== Club career ==
=== Early career ===
Bohl was born in the village of Einöd, and started out in the youth ranks of the local club, SpVgg Einöd, where his father was a youth coach. He also attended Hofenfels-Gymnasium in nearby Zweibrücken. As a teenager, he signed with 1. FC Saarbrücken. After three years with die Molschder, Bohl attracted the attention of a few Bundesliga teams. He eventually chose to sign with 1. FSV Mainz 05. The main reasons he cited where the recent success of their youth teams (their U19 team won the previous season's championship) and the promised steady playing time. He started at the U17 level at the club, where he scored 5 goals in 22 appearances, and was promoted to the U19 team the following year.

The 2011–12 season saw him score 5 goals in 24 matches, but it was during his second season with the U19 team (2012–13) that he impressed. He scored 5 goals in 20 matches, including a brace against Eintracht Frankfurt on 21 April 2013, where he scored his pair of goals nine minutes apart. He was also named captain three times, and he scored four of his goals in the final four games to close out the season. Mainz finished 6th in the Süd/Südwest group.

=== Professional career ===
At the conclusion of the 2012–13 season, Bohl was promoted to the Mainz reserve team, 1. FSV Mainz 05 II, playing in the Regionalliga. His debut for the team came on 27 July 2013, when he played a full 90 minutes in a 3–0 win against TSG 1899 Hoffenheim II. He also registered an assist. After another assist in his second game, he scored the fourth goal in a 4–0 win over Waldhof Mannheim in his third game on 11 August. Mainz finished in first place in the Südwest group, and qualified for the 2014–15 3. Liga season, with Bohl scoring in the 2–0 playoff win over TSG Neustrelitz to secure promotion.

Bohl made his professional debut in 3. Liga on 26 July 2014, playing a full 90 minutes in the 2–1 defeat to Arminia Bielefeld.

== International career ==
Bohl has made several appearance with the Germany national youth football teams. In May 2010, he made his first appearance was for the U16 national team, in a friendly against Denmark U16. In November, he earned a cap against Egypt U17.

Under head coach Christian Ziege, Bohl earned eight caps for the Germany U18 team in 2011 and 2012. On 12 December 2011, he scored his first international goal during a friendly against Israel U18 in Petah Tikva.

He also made nine appearances for the Germany U19 team. He was included on the German squad for the 2013 UEFA U19 Championship qualifying rounds, and earned four of those caps during the tournament.
