= Jan-Lucas Dorow =

German footballer

Personal information
- Date of birth: 26 April 1993 (age 33)
- Place of birth: Zweibrücken, Germany
- Height: 1.74 m (5 ft 8 1/2 in)
- Position: Forward

Team information
- Current team: Eintracht Trier
- Number: 10

Youth career
- SG Blaubach-Diedelkopf
- –2008: SV Kohlbachtal
- 2008–2012: 1. FC Kaiserslautern

Senior career*
Years	Team	Apps	(Gls)
2012–2016	1. FC Kaiserslautern II	76	(30)
2013–2015	→ 1. FC Kaiserslautern	4	(0)
2015	→ FSV Mainz II (loan)	8	(0)
2016–2019	Wormatia Worms	93	(20)
2019–2021	Rot-Weiss Essen	37	(3)
2021–2023	Rot-Weiß Oberhausen	53	(8)
2023–	Eintracht Trier	53	(5)
- * Club domestic league appearances and goals as of 26 June 2026

Jan-Lucas Dorow (born 26 April 1993) is a German footballer who plays as a striker for Eintracht Trier in the Regionalliga Südwest.

== Club career ==
Dorow joined 1. FC Kaiserslautern in 2008 from SV Kohlbachtal. He made his 2. Bundesliga debut at 13 December 2013 against SC Paderborn 07 replacing Enis Alushi after 87 minutes in a 0–1 home loss.
