= TuS Haltern =

German football club

- Full name: Turn- und Sportverein Haltern am See von 1882 e. V.
- Founded: 1 November 1882; 143 years ago
- Ground: Stauseekampfbahn
- Capacity: 4,000
- President: Christoph Metzelder
- Player/manager: Lukas Große-Puppendahl
- League: Bezirksliga Westfalen
- 2024-25: Landesliga Westfalen, 15th (relegated)
- Website: http://www.tus-haltern.de
Home colours	Away colours	Third colours

Turn und Sportverein Haltern am See von 1882 e.V., commonly referred to as TuS Haltern, is a German association football club based in Haltern am See, North Rhine-Westphalia. It was the first station for several players and coaches of the Bundesliga. In addition to the football department, which represents about half of the 1,000 club members, there are also departments for athletics, mass sports, gymnastics, tennis, table tennis, surfing as well as a running club. Tennis and table tennis, like the football department, have competition teams.

== History ==
The history of TuS Haltern is closely connected with the history of ATV Haltern and the Haltern firefighters. On 22 October 1882, the original association of all three was founded as Turner Feuerwehr Haltern e.V. (Turner Fire Brigade Haltern). The main focus after the foundation was gymnastics. In 1907 the football department was added, first as an informal group "Spiel und Sport Haltern", then in 1914 as the first permanent football club "Edelweiß". After World War I, various sports groups joined forces: football, athletics and gymnastics were the preferred sports. In 1930, a handball department was added. In 1937, the National Socialist League of the Reich for Physical Exercise merged all Haltern sports clubs under the name Turn- und Sportverein Haltern von 1882.

Only in 1951 were they re-established as TuS, ATV and Freiwillige Feuerwehr. Between 1952 and 1956, the football department of the club played in the then third-tier Landesliga Westfalen. For a long time, the point of contention was the right to carry the designation "von 1882". These disputes were settled until 1982, so that all three clubs celebrated their hundredth anniversary together in the city centre of Haltern.

Since 2008, TuS Haltern has been financially supported by its former player Christoph Metzelder. After a financial contribution to averting insolvency, a team of supporters was formed to improve the training conditions (sports field, coach education with DFB licences), to intensify public relations work (advertising campaign, networking via social media such as Facebook or Twitter) and to intensively support youth work. Germany's first advertising campaign by a district league club, "Tu's Haltern" (Do It Haltern), came in second in the 2010 Sports Marketing Prize. The Stauseekampfbahn got an artificial turf pitch in 2009. In 2016, TuS Haltern was promoted to the Westfalenliga, beating out BSV Roxel by a goal difference. In October 2016, TuS Haltern started the campaign "Wahrer Fußball statt Ware Fußball" (True football instead of commodity football) to get more attention for amateur football. One year later, TuS was promoted to the Oberliga Westfalen and in 2019 was promoted to the Regionalliga West.

== Current squad ==
As of 22 June 2019

Note: Flags indicate national team as defined under FIFA eligibility rules; some limited exceptions apply. Players may hold more than one non-FIFA nationality.

No.	Pos.	Nation	Player
1	GK	GER	Rafael Hester
2	DF	GER	Nico Wolters
3	DF	GER	Christoph Kasak
4	DF	GER	Tim Forsmann
5	DF	GER	Romario Wiesweg
6	MF	GER	Lars Pöhlker
7	MF	GER	Cedric Leon Vennemann
8	DF	GER	Nils Eisen
10	MF	GER	Deniz Fahri Batman
11	FW	GER	Jan-Niklas Kaiser
12	GK	GER	Alexander Rothkamm
13	MF	GER	Nick Schorn
14	FW	GER	Stefan Oerterer

No.	Pos.	Nation	Player
15	MF	GER	Phillip Mandla
17	MF	GER	Luca Bernoth
18	MF	GER	Robin Schultze
19	MF	GER	Luca Landewee
20	MF	GER	Ilias Anan
21	DF	GER	Lukas Opiola
22	GK	GER	Tim Oberwahrenbrock
23	DF	GER	Lukas Diericks
24	DF	GER	Noah Korczowski
27	DF	GER	Jan-Patrick Friedrich
28	MF	GER	Tim Kallenbach
29	MF	GER	Arda Nebi
34	MF	GER	Marvin Möllers
