= Lars Guenther =

German footballer

Personal information
- Date of birth: November 13, 1994 (age 31)
- Place of birth: Bad Homburg, Germany
- Position: Defensive midfielder

Team information
- Current team: FC Neu-Anspach

Youth career
- SG Anspach
- –2012: SV Wehen Wiesbaden

Senior career*
Years	Team	Apps	(Gls)
2011–2015	SV Wehen Wiesbaden II	44	(0)
2012–2014	SV Wehen Wiesbaden	6	(0)
2013–2014	→ Eintracht Trier (loan)	7	(0)
2015–2016	SpVgg Oberrad	17	(1)
2016–2020	Usinger TSG	67	(14)
2020–	FC Neu-Anspach	12	(1)
- * Club domestic league appearances and goals as of 11 January 2021

Lars Guenther (born November 13, 1994) is a German footballer who currently plays for FC Neu-Anspach.

== Career ==
Guenther made his 3. Liga debut for SV Wehen Wiesbaden in August 2012, as a substitute for Daniel Döringer in a 2–2 draw with SV Babelsberg 03. He joined Eintracht Trier on loan in July 2013.
