= Tevin Ihrig =

German footballer

Personal information
- Full name: Tevin Ihrig
- Date of birth: 10 March 1995 (age 31)
- Place of birth: Worms, Germany
- Height: 1.80 m (5 ft 11 in)
- Position: Centre back

Team information
- Current team: Wormatia Worms
- Number: 4

Youth career
- 2000–2007: ASV Nibelungen Worms
- 2007–2008: TuS Neuhausen
- 2008–2009: ASV Nibelungen Worms
- 2009–2014: Mainz 05

Senior career*
Years	Team	Apps	(Gls)
2014–2018	Mainz 05 II	82	(1)
2018–	Wormatia Worms	31	(1)
- * Club domestic league appearances and goals as of 16:22, 27 August 2019 (UTC)

Tevin Ihrig (born 10 March 1995) is a German footballer who plays as a defender for Wormatia Worms in the Regionalliga Südwest.
