= Patrick Schikowski =

German-Polish footballer

Personal information
- Full name: Patrick Schikowski
- Date of birth: 20 June 1992 (age 34)
- Place of birth: Düsseldorf, Germany
- Height: 1.81 m (5 ft 11 in)
- Position: Left winger

Youth career
- SC Unterbach
- –2005: Wuppertaler SV
- 2005–2008: Bayer Leverkusen
- 2008–2010: MSV Duisburg
- 2010–2011: Fortuna Düsseldorf

Senior career*
Years	Team	Apps	(Gls)
2011–2012	Fortuna Düsseldorf II	21	(0)
2012–2013	Greuther Fürth II	32	(3)
2013–2014	SSVg Velbert	4	(1)
2014–2015	Rot-Weiß Oberhausen	44	(11)
2015–2016	Rot-Weiß Erfurt	1	(0)
2015–2016	Rot-Weiß Erfurt II	9	(2)
2016–2017	Sportfreunde Lotte	7	(1)
2017–2018	Rot-Weiß Oberhausen	30	(5)
2018–2019	Wiedenbrück	29	(10)
2019	Bonner SC	14	(5)
2020–2022	SC Verl	33	(2)
2022	SSVg Velbert	18	(2)
2023–2024	1. FC Monheim	37	(3)

International career
	Poland U17	2	(1)
- Poland U18
- * Club domestic league appearances and goals as of 19 June 2024

Patrick Schikowski (born 20 June 1992) is a Polish professional footballer who plays as a left winger.

== Career ==
Born and raised in Germany, Schikowski also holds German citizenship.

He is the older brother of fellow footballer Florian Schikowski.
