= TSV Schott Mainz =

German football club

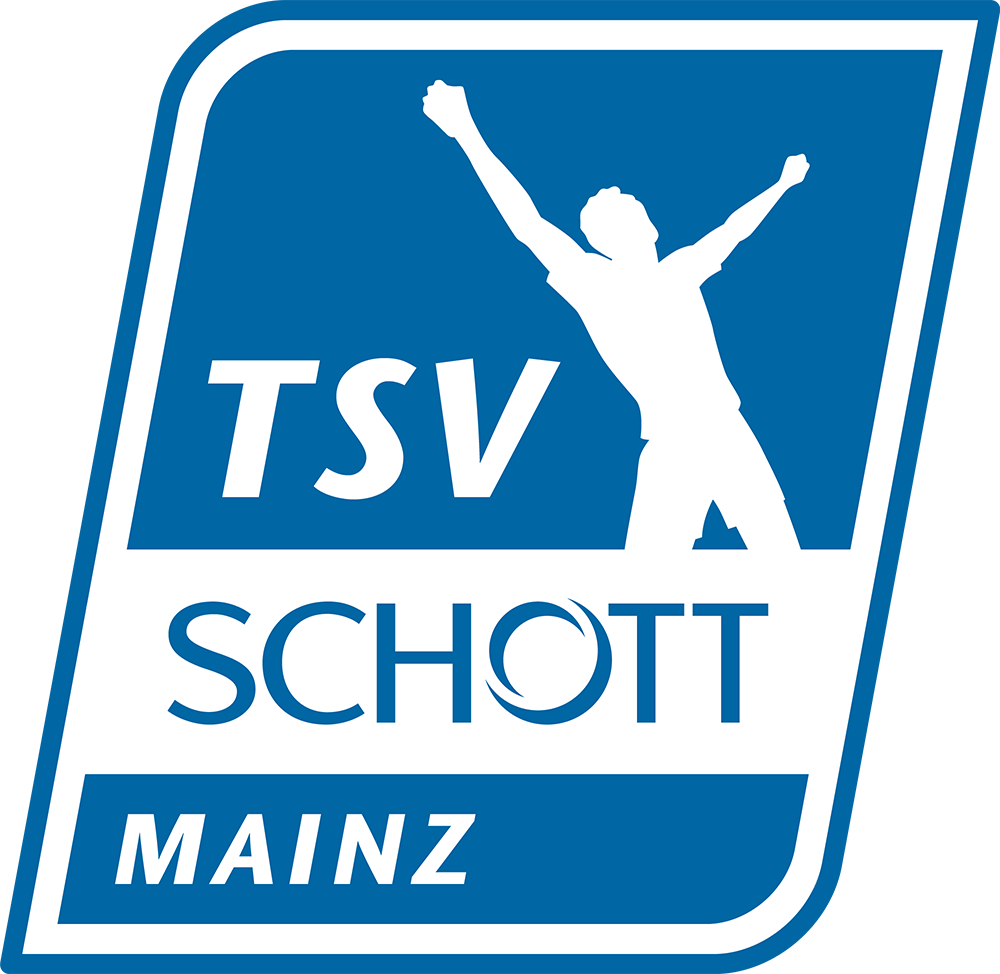
- Full name: Turn- und Sportverein Schott Mainz e.V.
- Founded: 1953
- Ground: Otto-Schott-Sportzentrum
- Chairman: Udo Ungeheuer
- Manager: Sascha Meeth
- League: Oberliga Rheinland-Pfalz/Saar (V)
- 2025–26: Regionalliga Südwest, 16th of 18th (relegated)
Home colours	Away colours

TSV Schott Mainz is a German multi-sport club from the city of Mainz, Rhineland-Palatinate. Apart from association football the club also offers more than 30 other sports like ice hockey, field hockey and American football and has 4,000 members. It is financially supported by Schott AG.

The club's greatest success has been to earn promotion to the tier four Regionalliga Südwest in 2017, 2020, 2023 and 2025.

== History ==
Formed in 1953, the club, then under the name of TuS Glaswerk Schott Mainz, earned promotion to the tier-four 2. Amateurliga Rheinhessen in 1962. Its first season there was a success, coming third in the league but results declined from there on and, by 1969 the club was relegated again after coming last. In the next four decades the club played in local amateur football before returning to its former heights.

Mainz began its rise through the league system in 2008 when it won the local Kreisliga championship, the first of four consecutive championships and promotions. In 2009 the club won the Bezirksklasse, followed by the Bezirksliga in 2010 and the Landesliga in 2011. Playing in the Verbandsliga Südwest for the next three seasons from 2011 Mainz came seventh in its first season there, followed by a runners-up finish in 2013. A Verbandsliga title in 2014 meant the club was promoted to the Oberliga Rheinland-Pfalz/Saar for the first time.

== Honours ==
The club's honours:

- Oberliga Rheinland-Pfalz/Saar (V)
  - Champions: 2017, 2020, 2023, 2025
- Verbandsliga Südwest (VI)
  - Champions: 2014
  - Runners-up: 2013
- Landesliga Südwest-Ost (VII)
  - Champions: 2011
- Bezirksliga Rheinhessen (VIII)
  - Champions: 2010
- Bezirksklasse Rheinhessen-Nord (IX)
  - Champions: 2009
- Kreisliga Mainz-Bingen-West (IX)
  - Champions: 2008
- Southwestern Cup
  - Champions: 2022, 2023, 2024, 2026

== Players ==
As of 5 February 2026

Note: Flags indicate national team as defined under FIFA eligibility rules; some limited exceptions apply. Players may hold more than one non-FIFA nationality.

No.	Pos.	Nation	Player
1	GK	GER	Robin Balters
2	DF	GER	Benedikt Blum
3	DF	GER	Maurizio Robotta
4	MF	GER	Daniel Bohl
5	DF	GER	Nils Gans
6	DF	GER	Dominik Ahlbach
7	MF	GER	Johannes Gansmann
8	MF	GER	Silas Schwarz
9	FW	GER	Jacob Roden
10	MF	GER	Etienne Portmann
17	DF	GER	Alexander Rimoldi
18	MF	GER	Righteous Vodi
19	FW	MAR	Abdellatif El Mahaoui

No.	Pos.	Nation	Player
20	MF	GER	Sean Horozovic
21	MF	GER	Jost Mairose
22	FW	BRA	Dennis De Souza Oelsner
24	DF	GER	Jan Just
25	MF	GER	Luca Wust
27	DF	GUY	Shai Neal
29	DF	GER	Leon Kern
30	MF	GER	Florian Lang
32	GK	GER	Jan Schulz
33	MF	GER	Luis Hesse
35	MF	GER	Ismael Wiegand
36	FW	COD	Shako Onangolo
42	DF	GER	Jan Wiltink

== Recent seasons ==
The recent season-by-season performance of the club:

Season	Division	Tier	Position
2003–04	1. Kreisklasse Mainz-Bingen-Ost 1	X	1st ↑
2004–05	Kreisliga Mainz-Bingen-West	IX	4th
2005–06	Kreisliga Mainz-Bingen-West	IX	3rd
2006–07	Kreisliga Mainz-Bingen-West	IX	3rd
2007–08	Kreisliga Mainz-Bingen-West	IX	1st ↑
2008–09	Bezirksklasse Rheinhessen-Nord	IX	1st ↑
2009–10	Bezirksliga Rheinhessen	VIII	1st ↑
2010–11	Landesliga Südwest-Ost	VII	1st ↑
2011–12	Verbandsliga Südwest	VI	7th
2012–13	Verbandsliga Südwest	VI	2nd
2013–14	Verbandsliga Südwest	VI	1st ↑
2014–15	Oberliga Rheinland-Pfalz/Saar	V	6th
2015–16	Oberliga Rheinland-Pfalz/Saar	V	13th
2016–17	Oberliga Rheinland-Pfalz/Saar	V	1st ↑
2017–18	Regionalliga Südwest	IV	18th ↓
2018–19	Oberliga Rheinland-Pfalz/Saar	V	7th
2019–20	Oberliga Rheinland-Pfalz/Saar	V	1st ↑
2020–21	Regionalliga Südwest	IV	20th
2021–22	Regionalliga Südwest	IV	17th ↓
2022–23	Oberliga Rheinland-Pfalz/Saar	V	1st ↑
2023–24	Regionalliga Südwest	IV	16th ↓
2024-25	Oberliga Rheinland-Pfalz/Saar	V	1st ↑
2025-26	Regionalliga Südwest	IV	16th ↓

- With the introduction of the Regionalligas in 1994 and the 3. Liga in 2008 as the new third tier, below the 2. Bundesliga, all leagues below dropped one tier.

=== Key ===
↑ Promoted	↓ Relegated
