= Bruchwegstadion =

Football stadium in Mainz, Germany

Coordinates: 50°00′03″N 8°14′44″E

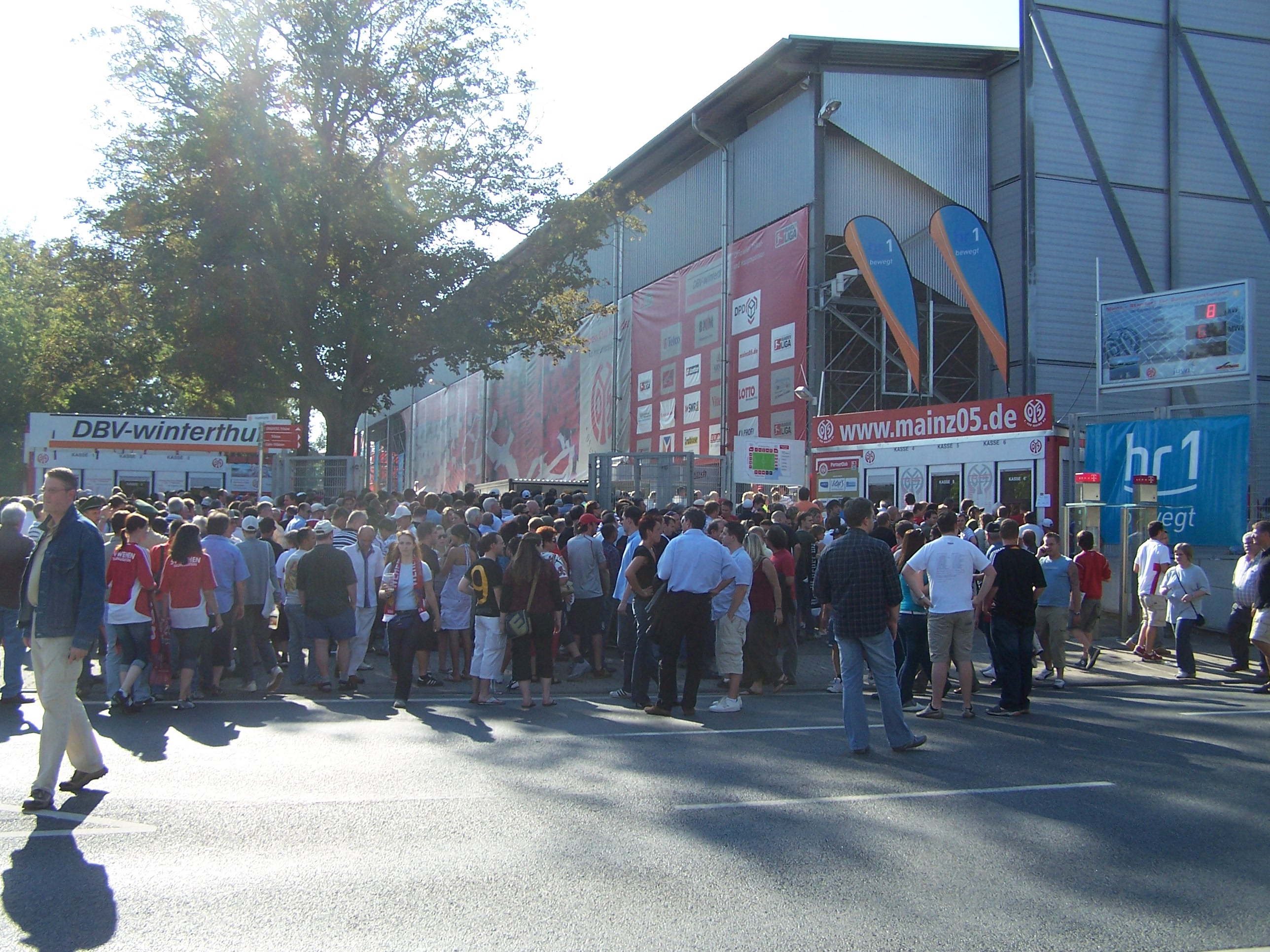
- Interactive map of Bruchwegstadion
- Location: Dr.-Martin-Luther-King-Weg 23; Mainz, Germany
- Owner: Mainz 05
- Operator: Mainz 05
- Capacity: 7,134

Construction
- Opened: 1929
- Renovated: 1947, 1951, 1953, 1965, 1981, 1997, 2002

Tenants
- Mainz 05 (1929–2011); Mainz 05 (women) (2024–)

The Bruchwegstadion is a football stadium in Mainz, Germany. The stadium was built in 1929 and several times reconstructed. It was the home stadium of Bundesliga club Mainz 05 before being replaced by Mewa Arena in 2011, known then as "Coface Arena." It is currently used for youth football matches of Mainz 05. The stadium became the home turf for the Mainz 05 women's team ahead of the 2024–25 season.

== Gallery ==
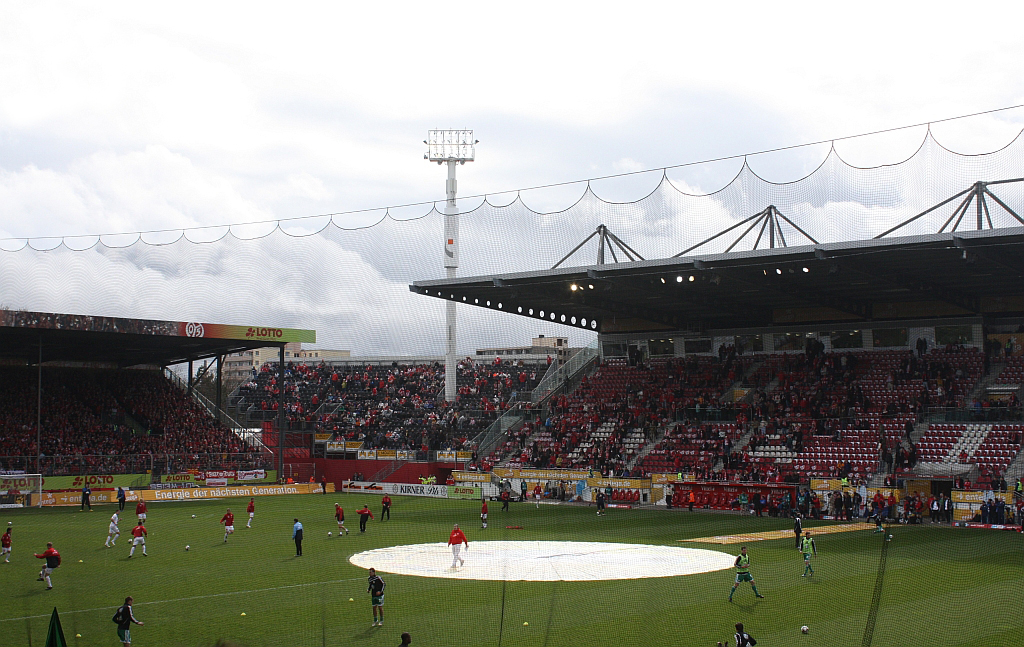
Players warming up before a match between Mainz and Wolfsburg.

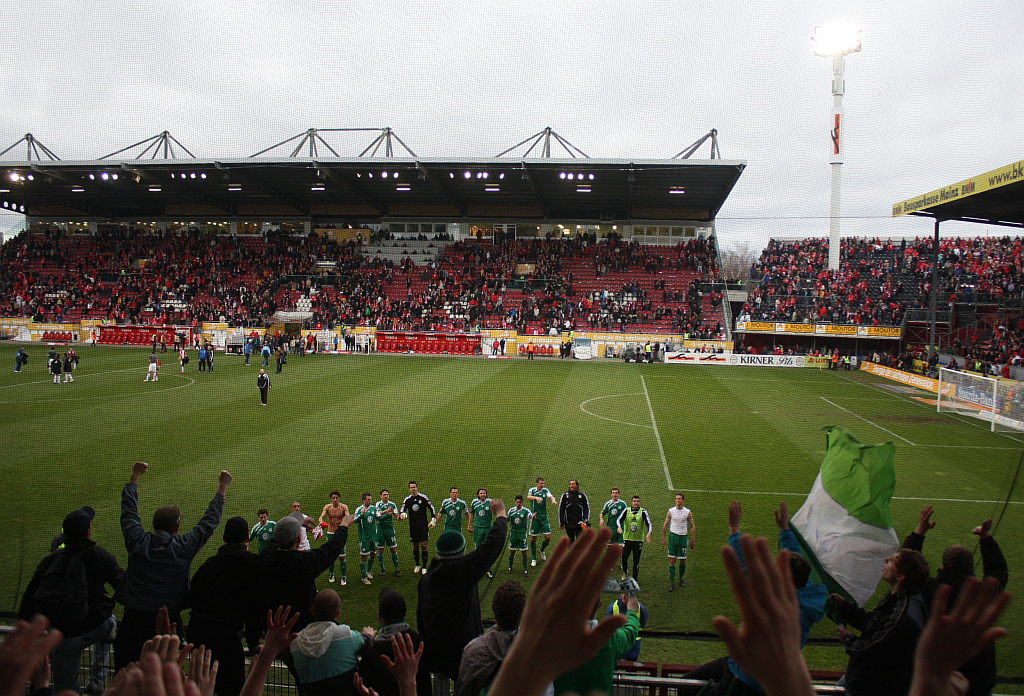
Wolfsburg players celebrate a victory with fans at Stadion am Bruchweg.

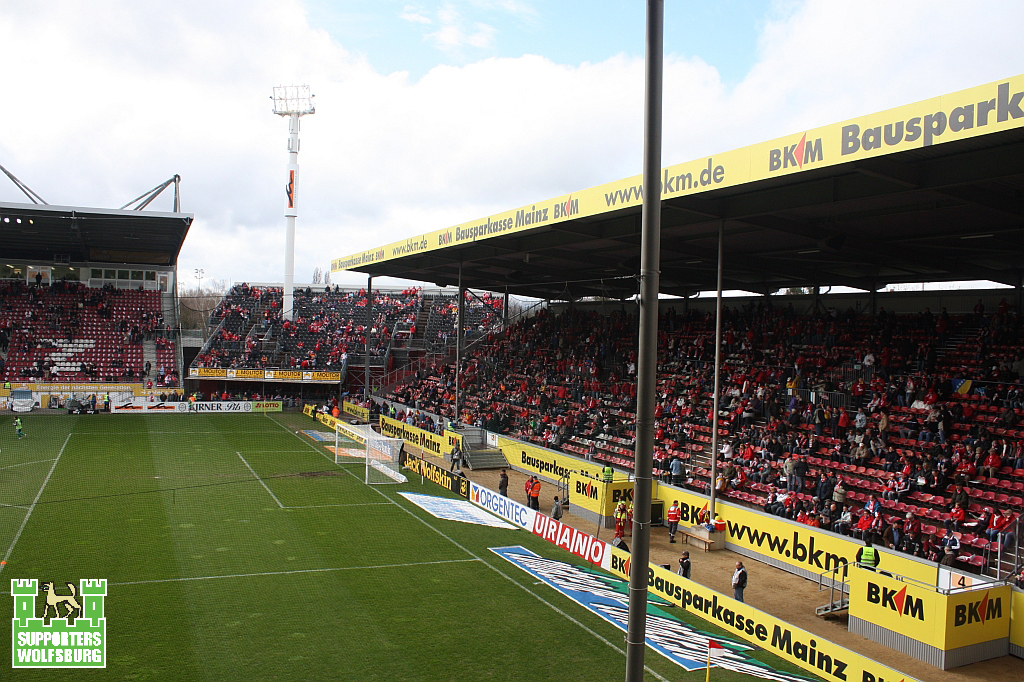
