= 1. FSV Mainz 05 II =

German football club

Mainz 05 II
- Ground: Bruchwegstadion
- Capacity: 7,378
- Manager: Benjamin Hoffmann
- League: Regionalliga Südwest (IV)
- 2025–26: Regionalliga Südwest, 9th of 18
Home colours	Away colours	Third colours

1. FSV Mainz 05 II is a German association football club from the town of Mainz, Rhineland-Palatinate.

It is the reserve team of 1. FSV Mainz 05. The team's greatest achievement came in 2014 when it won promotion to the 3. Liga for the first time, the highest league a reserve team can play in Germany. During the professional days of the senior side it played as 1. FSV Mainz 05 Amateure but when the senior side itself played at amateur level, from 1976 to 1988 and once more in 1989–90, the team played as 1. FSV Mainz 05 II. Since 2005 it has permanently adopted the name 1. FSV Mainz 05 II.

== History ==
The history of the reserve side of Mainz 05 is strongly intertwined with the fortunes of the senior side, having risen to higher league levels when the first team started to enjoy 2. Bundesliga and Bundesliga success. The senior side was a long-term member of the Oberliga Südwest from 1945, then a tier one league, to 1963 when the Bundesliga was introduced. Mainz did not qualify for the Bundesliga but played in the tier two Regionalliga Südwest instead. When the 2. Bundesliga was formed the club joined this league in 1974. Mainz played at this level for two seasons before disappearing into amateur football for 12 years. From 1990 the club reestablished itself in professional football and has been playing there since.

The reserve side, in the early years after the Second World War, played mostly in local amateur football. It rose to the tier three Amateurliga Südwest for a season in 1957–58 but came last and was promptly relegated again. It dropped through the 2. Amateurliga Rheinhessen as well but made a return to this league in 1973, being relegated again in 1977. It returned to what had now become the Bezirksliga Rheinhessen in 1981 for three seasons. After this the team did not make another appearance in the higher amateur leagues again until the late 1990s, having been disbanded for a time in between.

In 1996 the club, freshly promoted to the Bezirksliga Rheinhessen (VII), won a league title and promotion, followed by a championship in the Landesliga Südwest-Ost (VI) in 1997. It entered the Verbandsliga Südwest (V) for two seasons before another title in 1999 took the team up to the Oberliga.

The club spent the next four seasons in the Oberliga Südwest as a top of the table side, culminating in a second-place finish in 2002 and a league championship the year after. The later took the side to the side to the tier three Regionalliga Süd where it experienced two difficult seasons before being relegated again in 2005. In this era the club also saw five consecutive South West Cup wins from 2001 to 2005, a competition the team has been barred from like all reserve sides in Germany, following a rule change in 2008. Each of those cup wins entitled the club to enter the German Cup where it was knocked out in the first round at each occasion.

Another three good seasons in the Oberliga Südwest followed in which Mainz 05 II finished third, second and, eventually in 2008, league champions again. This time promotion took the club up to the Regionalliga West, a newly introduced league that was formed alongside the introduction of the 3. Liga that year. The first season there saw the club come fifth, the following three seasons after that it finished much lower.

Another change in the league system in 2012 saw the introduction of the Regionalliga Südwest, in which Mainz 05 II was now placed. In this league te club came eleventh in its first season there.

The 2013–14 Regionalliga season saw the best performance of the club at this level, finishing third. Because runners-up SC Freiburg II declined the opportunity to take part in the promotion round, choosing not to apply for a 3. Liga license, Mainz received its spot instead. There the team won promotion to the 3. Liga after overcoming Regionalliga Nordost champions TSG Neustrelitz 5–1 on aggregate in the promotion round.

== Stadium ==
1. FSV Mainz 05 II plays its home games in the Bruchwegstadion which hosts 20,300 spectators and used to be the home ground of the first team until it moved to the Coface Arena in 2011.

== Players ==
=== Current squad ===
As of 8 September 2026

Note: Flags indicate national team as defined under FIFA eligibility rules; some limited exceptions apply. Players may hold more than one non-FIFA nationality.

No.	Pos.	Nation	Player
2	DF	GER	Dominik Horlbeck
3	DF	EGY	Tebo Gabriel
4	DF	GER	Jakob Vött
5	DF	GER	Korbinian Burger
6	DF	GER	Philipp Schulz
7	MF	GER	Nick Cherny
8	MF	GER	Julian Derstroff
9	FW	LUX	Jayson Videira
10	FW	ESP	Fabio Moreno Fell
11	FW	USA	Andre Gitau
13	MF	TUR	Yunus Mallı
17	DF	GER	Jusuf Ugljanin
18	MF	JPN	Taiyu Yamasaki
19	FW	GER	Smail Kadrijaj

No.	Pos.	Nation	Player
20	DF	GER	Rael Nakuzola
21	GK	GER	Louis Babatz
22	GK	GER	Pit Zuther
23	MF	GER	Tobias Weileder
25	FW	GER	Mats Preßler
26	DF	GER	Luke Rahmann
27	DF	ROU	Emanuel-Pavel Marincău
28	GK	GER	Luke Gauer
29	FW	CIV	Alynho Haïdara
30	FW	GER	Mika Preßler
31	DF	GER	Daniel Imafidon
32	MF	ESP	Raúl König
33	MF	CIV	Mokesse Bamba

== Honours ==
The club's honours:

=== League ===
- Oberliga Südwest (IV)
  - Champions: 2003, 2008
  - Runners-up: 2002, 2007
- Verbandsliga Südwest (V)
  - Champions: 1999
- Landesliga Südwest-Ost (VI)
  - Champions: 1997
- Bezirksliga Rheinhessen (VII)
  - Champions: 1996

=== Cup ===
- South West Cup
  - Winners: 2001, 2002, 2003, 2004, 2005
  - Runners-up: 2006

== Recent seasons ==
The recent season-by-season performance of the club:

Season	Division	Tier	Position
1999–2000	Oberliga Südwest	IV	4th
2000–01	Oberliga Südwest	IV	7th
2001–02	Oberliga Südwest	IV	2nd
2002–03	Oberliga Südwest	IV	1st ↑
2003–04	Regionalliga Süd	III	14th
2004–05	Regionalliga Süd	III	17th ↓
2005–06	Oberliga Südwest	IV	3rd
2006–07	Oberliga Südwest	IV	2nd
2007–08	Oberliga Südwest	IV	1st ↑
2008–09	Regionalliga West	IV	5th
2009–10	Regionalliga West	IV	15th
2010–11	Regionalliga West	IV	13th
2011–12	Regionalliga West	IV	12th
2012–13	Regionalliga Südwest	IV	11th
2013–14	Regionalliga Südwest	IV	3rd ↑
2014–15	3. Liga	III	16th
2015–16	3. Liga	III	12th
2016–17	3. Liga	III	19th ↓
2017–18	Regionalliga Südwest	IV	7th
2018–19	Regionalliga Südwest	IV	14th
2019–20	Regionalliga Südwest	IV	6th
2020–21	Regionalliga Südwest	IV	17th
2021–22	Regionalliga Südwest	IV	5th
2022–23	Regionalliga Südwest	IV	9th
2023–24	Regionalliga Südwest	IV	8th
2024–25	Regionalliga Südwest	IV	12th
2025–26	Regionalliga Südwest	IV	9th

- With the introduction of the Regionalligas in 1994 and the 3. Liga in 2008 as the new third tier, below the 2. Bundesliga, all leagues below dropped one tier.
