= 2016–17 FSV Frankfurt season =

FSV Frankfurt
2016–17 season
- Manager: Gino Lettieri
- Stadium: Frankfurter Volksbank Stadion
- 3. Liga: 20th
- DFB-Pokal: First round
- Hessian Cup: Quarter-finals
Home colours	Away colours
- All statistics correct as of 18 March 2017.

The 2016–17 FSV Frankfurt season is the 118th season in the football club's history. After being relegated from the 2015–16 2. Bundesliga, FSV Frankfurt now play in the 3. Liga. They also participated in this season's edition of the domestic cup, the DFB-Pokal. The season covers a period from 1 July 2016 to 30 June 2017.

== Players ==
=== Squad ===
As of 20 August 2016

Note: Flags indicate national team as defined under FIFA eligibility rules; some limited exceptions apply. Players may hold more than one non-FIFA nationality.

No.	Pos.	Nation	Player
1	GK	GER	Jannis Pellowski
2	MF	GER	Patrick Ochs
3	DF	GER	Christopher Schorch
4	DF	GER	Marc Heitmeier
5	DF	GER	Sebastian Schachten
6	MF	GER	Denis Streker
7	MF	ITA	Massimo Ornatelli
8	MF	GER	Bentley Baxter Bahn
9	FW	GER	Cagatay Kader
10	FW	FRA	Smail Morabit
11	FW	LUX	Maurice Deville (on loan from 1. FC Kaiserslautern)
14	DF	USA	Shawn Barry
17	FW	GER	Stefan Maderer (on loan from Greuther Fürth)
19	DF	GER	Antonio Fischer

No.	Pos.	Nation	Player
20	MF	GER	Fabian Burdenski
21	GK	GER	Sören Pirson
22	DF	CAN	La'Vere Corbin-Ong
23	MF	GER	Nahom Gebru
24	FW	GER	Fabian Schleusener
25	MF	CRO	Mateo Andačić
26	FW	GER	Ranisav Jovanović
27	DF	GER	Steffen Schäfer
28	MF	GER	Leon Hammel
29	GK	GER	Matay Birol
30	MF	GER	Fabian Graudenz
31	MF	GER	Yannick Stark (on loan from SV Darmstadt 98)
32	MF	AFG	Milad Salem
—	DF	GER	Dennis Russ

== Competitions ==
Win Draw Loss

=== 3. Liga ===
==== League table ====
Pos	Team	Pld	W	D	L	GF	GA	GD	Pts	Promotion, qualification or relegation
16	Fortuna Köln	38	12	10	16	37	59	−22	46	
17	Werder Bremen II (Note: Reserve teams are ineligible for promotion or DFB-Pokal qualification.)	38	12	9	17	32	48	−16	45	
18	SC Paderborn (Note: SC Paderborn were originally relegated from the 2016–17 3. Liga after finishing 18th. However, 1860 Munich, who were relegated from the 2016–17 2. Bundesliga, were unable to obtain a license for the 2017–18 3. Liga. Therefore, SC Paderborn, who submitted a 3. Liga license application, remained in the league for the 2017–18 season.)	38	12	8	18	38	57	−19	44	
19	Mainz 05 II (R)	38	11	7	20	41	58	−17	40	Relegation to Regionalliga
20	FSV Frankfurt (Note: On 24 April 2017, FSV Frankfurt was deducted nine points for filing in for insolvency. Frankfurt appealed on 27 April 2017. On 4 May 2017, the appeal was rejected from the DFB. Another appeal was turned down on 10 May 2017. Frankfurt accepted the penalty on 17 May 2017.) (R)	38	7	13	18	38	50	−12	25	Relegation to Regionalliga

Source: DFB
Rules for classification: 1) Points; 2) Goal difference; 3) Goals scored
(R) Relegated

==== Results summary ====
Overall								Home						Away					
Pld	W	D	L	GF	GA	GD	Pts	W	D	L	GF	GA	GD	W	D	L	GF	GA	GD
38	7	13	18	38	50	−12	34	6	5	8	24	21	+3	1	8	10	14	29	−15

Last updated: 20 May 2017.
Source: kicker

==== Results by round ====
Round	1	2	3	4	5	6	7	8	9	10	11	12	13	14	15	16	17	18	19	20	21	22	23	24	25	26	27	28	29	30	31	32	33	34	35	36	37	38
Ground	A	H	A	H	A	H	A	H	H	A	H	A	H	A	H	A	H	A	H	H	A	H	A	H	A	H	A	A	H	A	H	A	H	A	H	A	H	A
Result	D	L	L	D	D	L	D	W	W	W	W	D	W	D	D	L	L	D	W	D	L	L	L	D	L	L	L	L	W	D	L	L	D	L	L	D	L	L
Position	18	18	18	18	18	18	18	15	15	15	14	14	14	14	14	16	17	17	17	17	18	18	18	18	18	18	18	18	18	18	18	18	18	19	19	20	20	20

Updated to match(es) played on 20 May 2017. Source: kicker
A = Away; H = Home; W = Win; D = Draw; L = Loss

==== Matches ====
30 July 2016 1	Holstein Kiel	1–1	FSV Frankfurt	Kiel
14:00	Janzer (yellow card) 18'; Kohlmann (yellow card) 21'; Sané 31'; Hoheneder (yellow card) 45+1'; Drexler (yellow card) 78'	Report	Corbin-Ong (yellow card) 48'; Ochs (yellow card) 78'; Schleusener 84'	Stadium: Holstein-Stadion; Attendance: 5,339; Referee: Sascha Stegemann

6 August 2016 2	FSV Frankfurt	0–1	Rot-Weiß Erfurt	Frankfurt
14:00	Schleusener (yellow card) 11'; Streker (yellow card) 23'	Report	Kammlott 85'	Stadium: Frankfurter Volksbank Stadion; Attendance: 4,352; Referee: Aarne Aarnink

10 August 2016 3	Chemnitzer FC	2–1	FSV Frankfurt	Chemnitz
19:00	Fink 6' (pen.) 68'; Endres (yellow card) 25'; Conrad (yellow card) 27'; Frahn (yellow card) 30'	Report	Schorch (yellow card) 5'; Ornatelli 43'; Streker (yellow card) 54'	Stadium: community4you ARENA; Attendance: 6,879; Referee: Robert Kempter

13 August 2016 4	FSV Frankfurt	1–1	Jahn Regensburg	Frankfurt
14:00	Schorch (yellow card) 23'; Stark 46'	Report	Geipl 48' (yellow card) 54' (yellow-red card); Pentke (yellow card) 84'	Stadium: Frankfurter Volksbank Stadion; Attendance: 3,281; Referee: Patrick Alt

27 August 2016 5	Hansa Rostock	1–1	FSV Frankfurt	Rostock
14:00	Ahlschwede (yellow card) 63'; Holthaus (yellow card) 80'; Hoffmann (yellow card) 88'; Deville 90+2' (o.g.)	Report	Schachten (yellow card) 26'; Bahn (yellow card) 39'; Schorch (yellow card) 68'; Deville 71'; Schäfer (yellow card) 74'; Heitmeier (red card) 84'	Stadium: Ostseestadion; Attendance: 14,500; Referee: Martin Thomsen

10 September 2016 6	FSV Frankfurt	1–3	Sonnenhof Großaspach	Frankfurt
14:00	Leist 35' (o.g.); Streker (yellow card) 41'; Schorch (yellow card) 47'; Schleusener (yellow card) 62'	Report	Jüllich 22'; Röser 76' (pen.); Röttger 79'	Stadium: Frankfurter Volksbank Stadion; Attendance: 3,172; Referee: Sven Jablonski

17 September 2016 7	Hallescher FC	1–1	FSV Frankfurt	Halle (Saale)
14:00	Kleineheismann (yellow card) 35' (yellow-red card); Fennell 74'; Barnofsky (yellow card) 87'	Report	Schleusener (yellow card) 41'; Ornatelli 44'; Bahn (yellow card) 64'	Stadium: Erdgas Sportpark; Attendance: 5,798; Referee: Florian Badstübner

21 September 2016 8	FSV Frankfurt	4–1	Preußen Münster	Frankfurt
19:00	Stark 8' 28'; Schleusener 52' 89'	Report	Wiebe (yellow card) 35'; Grimaldi 67'; Al-Hazaimeh (yellow card) 79'	Stadium: Frankfurter Volksbank Stadion; Attendance: 3,351; Referee: Benjamin Brand

24 September 2016 9	FSV Frankfurt	2–1	VfR Aalen	Frankfurt
14:00	Schleusener 18' (yellow card) 90+4'; Barry 54'; Stark (yellow card) 68'; Ornatelli (yellow card) 90+1'	Report	Ojala 33'; Kartalis (yellow card) 64'; Schwabl (yellow card) 87'	Stadium: Frankfurter Volksbank Stadion; Attendance: 2,793; Referee: Benjamin Bläser

1 October 2016 10	Sportfreunde Lotte	0–1	FSV Frankfurt	Lotte
14:00	Neidhart (yellow card) 59'; Nauber (yellow card) 70'	Report	Schleusener 31'; Kader (yellow card) 68'	Stadium: Frimo Stadion; Attendance: 1,550; Referee: Deniz Aytekin

16 October 2016 11	FSV Frankfurt	6–0	Fortuna Köln	Frankfurt
14:00	Streker 13' (yellow card) 35'; Bahn 30'; Kader 38'; Schleusener 42'; Stark 63'; Ornatelli 84' (pen.)	Report	Röcker (yellow card) 60'; Flottmann (yellow card) 83'	Stadium: Frankfurter Volksbank Stadion; Attendance: 3,385; Referee: Riem Hussein

22 October 2016 12	FSV Zwickau	1–1	FSV Frankfurt	Zwickau
14:00	Wachsmuth (yellow card) 13'; Frick (yellow card) 32'; Berger (yellow card) 63'; Zimmermann 81' (red card) 88'	Report	Stark (yellow card) 16' (goal) 71'; Jovanović (yellow card) 85'	Stadium: Stadion Zwickau; Attendance: 3,950; Referee: Sören Storks

29 October 2016 13	FSV Frankfurt	3–0	SC Paderborn	Frankfurt
14:00	Schleusener 18'; Ornatelli 29' (yellow card) 69'; Barry (yellow card) 59'; Bahn 80'	Report	Bickel (yellow card) 47'; Zolinski (yellow card) 65'	Stadium: Frankfurter Volksbank Stadion; Attendance: 3,211; Referee: Bastian Dankert

5 November 2016 14	VfL Osnabrück	1–1	FSV Frankfurt	Osnabrück
14:00	Kristo (yellow card) 19'; Wriedt 49'	Report	Bahn (yellow card) 48'; Graudenz 65'; Heitmeier (yellow card) 79'; Ochs (yellow card) 85'	Stadium: osnatel ARENA; Attendance: 7,318; Referee: Lasse Koslowski

19 November 2016 15	FSV Frankfurt	0–0	MSV Duisburg	Frankfurt
14:00	Ochs (yellow card) 67'; Schleusener (yellow card) 80'; Jovanović (yellow card) 88'	Report	Janjić (yellow card) 76'; Bajić (yellow card) 77'	Stadium: Frankfurter Volksbank Stadion; Attendance: 4,639; Referee: Lasse Koslowski

27 November 2016 16	Mainz 05 II	1–0	FSV Frankfurt	Mainz
14:00	Rossmann 16'; Parker (yellow card) 52'; Steinmann (yellow card) 76'; Bouziane (yellow card) 90+2'	Report	Stark (yellow card) 83'; Barry (yellow card) 88'	Stadium: Bruchwegstadion; Attendance: 1,189; Referee: Florian Heft

4 December 2016 17	FSV Frankfurt	0–1	1. FC Magdeburg	Frankfurt
14:00	Schachten (yellow card) 72'	Report	Ernst (yellow card) 12'; Düker 19'; Schiller (yellow card) 45+1'; Handke (yellow card) 90'	Stadium: Frankfurter Volksbank Stadion; Attendance: 4,028; Referee: Robert Kampka

10 December 2016 18	SV Werder Bremen II	0–0	FSV Frankfurt	Bremen
14:00	Rother (yellow card) 31'	Report	Streker (yellow card) 27'	Stadium: Weserstadion Platz 11; Attendance: 515; Referee: Tim-Julian Skorczyk

17 December 2016 19	FSV Frankfurt	3–1	Wehen Wiesbaden	Frankfurt
14:00	Ochs (yellow card) 18'; Kader 30'; Deville 35'; Bahn (yellow card) 81'; Corbin-Ong (yellow card) 90+2'; Schleusener 90+3'	Report	Blacha 26'; Dams (yellow card) 34'; Funk (yellow card) 56'; Ruprecht (yellow card) 76'	Stadium: Frankfurter Volksbank Stadion; Attendance: 3,375; Referee: Guido Winkmann

28 January 2017 20	FSV Frankfurt	0–0	Holstein Kiel	Frankfurt
14:00	Bahn (yellow card) 23'; Barry (yellow card) 59'	Report	Herrmann (yellow card) 9'; Schindler (yellow card) 31' (yellow-red card); Peitz (yellow card) 63'; Czichos (yellow card) 67'	Stadium: Frankfurter Volksbank Stadion; Attendance: 3,146; Referee: Justus Zorn

4 February 2017 21	RW Erfurt	1–0	FSV Frankfurt	Erfurt
14:00	Möckel (yellow card) 21'; Menz 22' (pen.); Erb (yellow card) 63'; Klewin (yellow card) 84'	Report	Ochs (yellow card) 21'; Jovanović (yellow card) 66'	Stadium: Steigerwaldstadion; Attendance: 3,891; Referee: Benedikt Kempkes

11 February 2017 22	FSV Frankfurt	0–3	Chemnitzer FC	Frankfurt
14:00	Corbin-Ong (yellow card) 45+2'; Barry (yellow card) 64'	Report	Mast 5'; Dabanlı (yellow card) 29'; Jopek 43'; Hansch 51'	Stadium: Frankfurter Volksbank Stadion; Attendance: 2,843; Referee: Thorben Siewer

18 February 2017 23	SSV Jahn Regensburg	2–1	FSV Frankfurt	Regensburg
14:00	Geipl (yellow card) 30' (goal) 42' (pen.); Schorch 68' (o.g.)	Report	Kader 14' (yellow card) 62'; Ochs (yellow card) 38'	Stadium: Continental Arena; Attendance: 4,461; Referee: Eric Müller

25 February 2017 24	FSV Frankfurt	0–0	Hansa Rostock	Frankfurt
14:00		Report		Stadium: Frankfurter Volksbank Stadion; Attendance: 4,197; Referee: Robert Kampka

4 March 2017 25	SG Sonnenhof Großaspach	3–1	FSV Frankfurt	Aspach
14:00	Röser 50' (pen.); Schiek 66'; Gyau (yellow card) 68'; Sohm (yellow card) 81'; Binakaj 83'	Report	Stark (yellow card) 43' (goal) 75'; Schorch (yellow card) 49'; Ochs (yellow card) 68'	Stadium: Mechatronik Arena; Attendance: 1,200; Referee: Mattias Jöllenbeck

11 March 2017 26	FSV Frankfurt	0–1	Hallescher FC	Frankfurt
14:00		Report	Diring 14' (yellow card) 60'	Stadium: Frankfurter Volksbank Stadion; Attendance: 3,071; Referee: Bastian Börner

14 March 2017 27	SC Preußen Münster	2–1	FSV Frankfurt	Münster
19:00	Aydın 23' (pen.); Rühle 89' (yellow card) 90'; Schweers (yellow card) 90+4'	Report	Kader 3'; Schäfer (yellow card) 23'; Corbin-Ong (yellow card) 59'; Barry (yellow card) 90+4'; Stark (yellow card) 90+5'	Stadium: Preußenstadion; Attendance: 5,936; Referee: Marcel Schütz

18 March 2017 28	VfR Aalen	2–0	FSV Frankfurt	Aalen
14:00	Wegkamp 60'; Stanese (yellow card) 70'; Schulz 90+3'	Report	Bahn (yellow card) 83'	Stadium: SCHOLZ ARENA; Attendance: 3,262; Referee: Robert Hartmann

25 March 2017 29	FSV Frankfurt	2–0	Sportfreunde Lotte	Frankfurt
14:00	Stark 23' (pen.) (yellow card) 61'; Bahn 38'; Schorch (yellow card) 67'; Ochs (yellow card) 82'	Report	Heyer (yellow card) 51'; Rosinger (yellow card) 53'	Stadium: Frankfurter Volksbank Stadion; Attendance: 3,173; Referee: Eric Müller

1 April 2017 30	Fortuna Köln	0–0	FSV Frankfurt	Cologne
14:00	Schröder (yellow card) 68'; Pazurek (yellow card) 79'	Report	Barry (yellow card) 58'; Bahn (yellow card) 77'	Stadium: Südstadion; Attendance: 1,846; Referee: Nicolas Winter

5 April 2017 31	FSV Frankfurt	0–1	FSV Zwickau	Frankfurt
18:00	Stark (yellow card) 15'; Corbin-Ong (yellow card) 57'; Schorch (yellow card) 73'; Ornatelli (yellow card) 87'	Report	Streker 49' (o.g.)	Stadium: Frankfurter Volksbank Stadion; Attendance: 3,322; Referee: Florian Kornblum

8 April 2017 32	SC Paderborn	3–0	FSV Frankfurt	Paderborn
14:00	Boeder (yellow card) 29'; Riski 45+2'; Schonlau (yellow card) 62'; Piossek 65' 76'; Krauße (yellow card) 84'	Report	Ornatelli (yellow card) 45+3'; Hammel (yellow card) 54'; Streker (yellow card) 82'	Stadium: Benteler-Arena; Attendance: 4,327; Referee: Asmir Osmanagic

16 April 2017 33	FSV Frankfurt	1–1	VfL Osnabrück	Frankfurt
14:00	Kader 53'; Schachten (yellow card) 63'	Report	Groß (yellow card) 72'; Menga 75'; Appiah (yellow card) 90+3'	Stadium: Frankfurter Volksbank Stadion; Attendance: 2,872; Referee: Sören Storks

22 April 2017 34	MSV Duisburg	3–2	FSV Frankfurt	Duisburg
14:00	Onuegbu 53'; Streker 57' (o.g.); Hajri 61'; Albutat (yellow card) 63'; Iljutcenko (yellow card) 69'	Report	Kader 12' (yellow card) 90+2'; Bahn 20'; Schachten (yellow card) 28'; Stark (yellow card) 60' (yellow-red card); Schorch (yellow card) 69'	Stadium: Schauinsland-Reisen-Arena; Attendance: 12,839; Referee: Benjamin Brand

29 April 2017 35	FSV Frankfurt	1–2	Mainz 05 II	Frankfurt
14:00	Graudenz 51'; Schäfer (yellow card) 60'	Report	Slišković 43'; Bohl (yellow card) 60'; Rossmann 69'; Ihrig (yellow card) 81'	Stadium: Frankfurter Volksbank Stadion; Attendance: 2,268; Referee: Michael Bacher

6 May 2017 36	1. FC Magdeburg	1–1	FSV Frankfurt	Magdeburg
14:00	Beck 59'; Butzen (yellow card) 85'	Report	Graudenz 63'; Streker (yellow card) 90+3'	Stadium: MDCC-Arena; Attendance: 17,129; Referee: Alexander Sather

13 May 2017 37	FSV Frankfurt	0–4	SV Werder Bremen II	Frankfurt
13:30		Summary	Yatabaré 57'; Eilers 65' 67'; Schmidt 85'	Stadium: Frankfurter Volksbank Stadion; Attendance: 2,553; Referee: Patrick Schult

20 May 2017 38	Wehen Wiesbaden	4–1	FSV Frankfurt	Wiesbaden
13:30	Schäffler 18'; Schwadorf 24'; Schäffler 63'; Schäffler 69'	Summary	Stark 58'	Stadium: BRITA-Arena; Attendance: 2,343; Referee: Tim-Julian Skorczyk

=== DFB-Pokal ===
20 August 2016 First round	FSV Frankfurt	1–2	VfL Wolfsburg	Frankfurt
20:45 CEST (UTC+2)	Bahn (yellow card) 32'; Streker (yellow card) 35'; Schleusener 52', (yellow card) 78'; Barry (yellow card) 90+1'	Report	Schäfer 5' (o.g.); Dost 16'; Bruma (yellow card) 58'; Didavi (yellow card) 66'; Gerhardt (yellow card) 89'	Stadium: Frankfurter Volksbank Stadion; Attendance: 5,050; Referee: Wolfgang Stark
