= 2006–07 Borussia Dortmund season =

2006–07 season of Borussia Dortmund

Borussia Dortmund
2006–07 season
- Manager: Bert van Marwijk (until 18 December); Jürgen Röber (from 19 December to 12 March); Thomas Doll (from 13 March)
- Stadium: Westfalenstadion
- Bundesliga: 9th
- DFB-Pokal: Second round
- Top goalscorer: Alexander Frei (16)
Home colours	Away colours	Third colours

During the 2006–07 German football season, Borussia Dortmund competed in the Bundesliga.

== Season summary ==
Dortmund finished the season in 9th place, their worst finish in 7 years.

== Players ==
=== First-team squad ===
Squad at end of season

Note: Flags indicate national team as defined under FIFA eligibility rules; some limited exceptions apply. Players may hold more than one non-FIFA nationality.

No.	Pos.	Nation	Player
1	GK	(Germany) GER	Roman Weidenfeller
2	DF	(Germany) GER	Martin Amedick
3	DF	(Germany) GER	Markus Brzenska
4	DF	(Germany) GER	Christian Wörns
5	MF	(Germany) GER	Sebastian Kehl
6	MF	(Germany) GER	Florian Kringe
7	MF	(Brazil) BRA	Tinga
8	FW	(Ghana) GHA	Matthew Amoah
9	FW	(Paraguay) PAR	Nelson Valdez
10	MF	(South Africa) RSA	Steven Pienaar
13	FW	(Switzerland) SUI	Alexander Frei
14	FW	(Poland) POL	Ebi Smolarek

No.	Pos.	Nation	Player
16	MF	(Democratic Republic of the Congo) COD	Kosi Saka
17	DF	(Brazil) BRA	Dedê
18	MF	(Germany) GER	Lars Ricken
20	GK	(Germany) GER	Bernd Meier
21	DF	(Germany) GER	Christoph Metzelder
22	MF	(Germany) GER	Marc-André Kruska
23	DF	(Switzerland) SUI	Philipp Degen
25	MF	(Turkey) TUR	Nuri Şahin (Note: Şahin was born in Lüdenscheid, Germany, but also qualified to represent Turkey internationally through his parents and represented them at U-16, U-17, U-19 and U-21 level before making his international debut for Turkey in 2005.)
27	DF	(Germany) GER	Uwe Hünemeier
28	MF	(Germany) GER	Sebastian Tyrała (Note: Tyrała was born in Racibórz, Poland, but also qualified to represent Germany internationally and represented them at U-19 level before making his international debut for Poland in December 2008.)
43	MF	(Germany) GER	Daniel Gordon (Note: Gordon was born in Dortmund, Germany, but also qualifies to represent Jamaica internationally and made his international debut for Jamaica in June 2013.)

=== Left club during season ===
Note: Flags indicate national team as defined under FIFA eligibility rules; some limited exceptions apply. Players may hold more than one non-FIFA nationality.

No. / Pos. / Nation / Player; 7 / MF / (South Africa) RSA / Delron Buckley (on loan to FC Basel)	No. / Pos. / Nation / Player; 11 / MF / (Germany) GER / David Odonkor (to Real Betis)

== Borussia Dortmund II ==
The following players were assigned a number for the first team, but did not make an appearance this season.

Note: Flags indicate national team as defined under FIFA eligibility rules; some limited exceptions apply. Players may hold more than one non-FIFA nationality.

No.	Pos.	Nation	Player
26	MF	(Germany) GER	Marc Heitmeier
30	MF	(Turkey) TUR	Mehmet Akgün (Note: Akgün was born in Bielefeld, Germany, but also qualified to represent Turkey internationally and represented them at U-17 level.)
31	DF	(Republic of Ireland) IRL	Patrick Kohlmann (Note: Kohlmann was born in Dortmund, West Germany, but also qualified to represent the Republic of Ireland internationally through his mother and represented them at U-21 level.)
33	DF	(Germany) GER	David Vržogić

No.	Pos.	Nation	Player
34	GK	(Germany) GER	Sören Pirson
36	MF	(Germany) GER	Abdenour Amachaibou (Note: Amachaibou was born in Düren, West Germany, and represented them at U-19 level, but also qualified to represent Morocco internationally and represented them at U-23 level.)
38	DF	(Germany) GER	Nico Hillenbrand

== Statistics ==
=== Appearances and goals ===
As of end of season

No.	Pos	Nat	Player	Total		Bundesliga		DFB-Pokal	
No.	Pos	Nat	Player	Apps	Goals	Apps	Goals	Apps	Goals
Goalkeepers
1	GK	(Germany) GER	Roman Weidenfeller	36	0	34	0	2	0
34	GK	(Germany) GER	Sören Pirson	1	0	0	0	0+1	0
Defenders
2	DF	(Germany) GER	Martin Amedick	19	2	12+6	2	1	0
3	DF	(Germany) GER	Markus Brzenska	26	3	21+4	3	1	0
4	DF	(Germany) GER	Christian Wörns	26	2	24	2	2	0
17	DF	(Brazil) BRA	Dedê	32	0	30	0	2	0
21	DF	(Germany) GER	Christoph Metzelder	19	0	17+2	0	0	0
23	DF	(Switzerland) SUI	Philipp Degen	29	0	24+3	0	2	0
27	DF	(Germany) GER	Uwe Hünemeier	1	0	0+1	0	0	0
Midfielders
5	MF	(Germany) GER	Sebastian Kehl	6	0	4+2	0	0	0
6	MF	(Germany) GER	Florian Kringe	36	2	34	2	2	0
7	MF	(Brazil) BRA	Tinga	33	5	31	4	1+1	1
10	MF	(South Africa) RSA	Steven Pienaar	27	0	20+5	0	2	0
16	MF	(Democratic Republic of the Congo) COD	Kosi Saka	6	0	0+6	0	0	0
18	MF	(Germany) GER	Lars Ricken	14	0	5+8	0	0+1	0
22	MF	(Germany) GER	Marc-André Kruska	33	1	29+2	1	2	0
25	MF	(Turkey) TUR	Nuri Şahin	25	0	11+13	0	0+1	0
28	MF	(Germany) GER	Sebastian Tyrała	6	0	0+6	0	0	0
43	MF	(Germany) GER	Daniel Gordon	5	0	0+5	0	0	0
Forwards
8	FW	(Ghana) GHA	Matthew Amoah	9	0	1+8	0	0	0
9	FW	(Paraguay) PAR	Nelson Valdez	31	2	20+9	1	2	1
13	FW	(Switzerland) SUI	Alexander Frei	34	17	31+1	16	2	1
14	FW	(Poland) POL	Ebi Smolarek	32	9	25+5	9	1+1	0
Players transferred out during the season
7	MF	(South Africa) RSA	Delron Buckley	0	0	0	0	0	0
11	MF	(Germany) GER	David Odonkor	2	0	1+1	0	0	0

Last updated: 30 May 2007
Source: Competitions

== Transfers ==
=== In ===
- Nelson Valdez - Werder Bremen, July, €4,700,000

=== Out ===
- Tomáš Rosický - Arsenal, 23 May, undisclosed
- Delron Buckley - FC Basel, season-long loan
- David Odonkor - Real Betis, €6,000,000

== Competitions ==
=== Bundesliga ===
==== League table ====
Pos	Team	Pld	W	D	L	GF	GA	GD	Pts	Qualification or relegation
7	Hamburger SV	34	10	15	9	43	37	+6	45	Qualification to Intertoto Cup third round (Note: Since 1. FC Nürnberg won the 2006–07 DFB-Pokal, thus qualifying for the UEFA Cup first round, Hamburger SV entered the Intertoto Cup third round.)
8	VfL Bochum	34	13	6	15	49	50	−1	45	
9	Borussia Dortmund	34	12	8	14	41	43	−2	44	
10	Hertha BSC	34	12	8	14	50	55	−5	44	
11	Hannover 96	34	12	8	14	41	50	−9	44	

Source: kicker.de
Rules for classification: 1) Points; 2) Goal difference; 3) Goals scored

==== Matches ====
- Bayern Munich 2-0 Borussia Dortmund
- Borussia Dortmund 3-2 Bayern Munich
- Schalke 04 3-1 Borussia Dortmund
- VfL Wolfsburg 0-2 Borussia Dortmund
