= 2005–06 Borussia Dortmund season =

2005-06 season of Borussia Dortmund

Borussia Dortmund
2005–06 season
- Manager: (Netherlands) Bert van Marwijk
- Stadium: Westfalenstadion
- Bundesliga: 7th
- DFB-Pokal: First round
- Top goalscorer: League: Ebi Smolarek (13); All: Ebi Smolarek (13)
| Home colours | Away colours | Third colours |

During the 2005–06 German football season, Borussia Dortmund competed in the Bundesliga.

== Season summary ==
Another mediocre season saw Dortmund repeat last season's seventh-place finish, albeit with nine fewer points.

== First-team squad ==
Squad at end of season

Note: Flags indicate national team as defined under FIFA eligibility rules; some limited exceptions apply. Players may hold more than one non-FIFA nationality.

| No. | Pos. | Nation | Player |
|---|---|---|---|
| 1 | GK | GER | Roman Weidenfeller |
| 3 | DF | GER | Markus Brzenska |
| 4 | DF | GER | Christian Wörns |
| 5 | MF | GER | Sebastian Kehl |
| 6 | MF | GER | Florian Kringe |
| 7 | MF | RSA | Delron Buckley |
| 8 | FW | GHA | Matthew Amoah |
| 9 | FW | CZE | Jan Koller |
| 10 | MF | CZE | Tomáš Rosický |
| 11 | MF | GER | David Odonkor |
| 13 | MF | COD | Kosi Saka |
| 14 | FW | POL | Ebi Smolarek |
| 15 | FW | GER | Marcus Steegmann |
| 16 | FW | NED | Cedric van der Gun |
| 17 | DF | BRA | Dedê |
| 18 | MF | GER | Lars Ricken |

| No. | Pos. | Nation | Player |
|---|---|---|---|
| 19 | MF | TUR | Mehmet Akgün (Note: Akgün was born in Bielefeld, Germany, but also qualified to represent Turkey internationally and represented them at U-17 level.) |
| 20 | GK | GER | Bernd Meier |
| 21 | DF | GER | Christoph Metzelder |
| 22 | MF | GER | Marc-André Kruska |
| 23 | DF | SUI | Philipp Degen |
| 24 | MF | TUR | Nizamettin Çalışkan (Note: Çalışkan was born in Hagen, Germany, but also qualified to represent Turkey internationally and represented them at U-17 and U-19 level.) |
| 25 | MF | TUR | Nuri Şahin (Note: Şahin was born in Lüdenscheid, Germany, but also qualified to represent Turkey internationally through his parents and represented them at U-16, U-17, U-19 and U-21 level before making his international debut for Turkey in 2005.) |
| 26 | MF | GER | Marc Heitmeier |
| 27 | DF | GER | Uwe Hünemeier |
| 28 | MF | GER | Sebastian Tyrała (Note: Tyrała was born in Racibórz, Poland, but also qualified to represent Germany internationally and represented them at U-19 level before making his international debut for Poland in December 2008.) |
| 29 | MF | GER | Sascha Rammel |
| 30 | GK | NED | Dennis Gentenaar |
| 32 | GK | GER | Sascha Samulewicz |
| 33 | FW | GER | Salvatore Gambino |
| 34 | GK | GER | Sören Pirson |
| 39 | MF | GER | Marcel Großkreutz |

== Competitions ==
=== Bundesliga ===
==== League table ====
| Pos | Team | Pld | W | D | L | GF | GA | GD | Pts | Qualification or relegation |
|---|---|---|---|---|---|---|---|---|---|---|
| 5 | Bayer Leverkusen | 34 | 14 | 10 | 10 | 64 | 49 | +15 | 52 | Qualification to UEFA Cup first round |
| 6 | Hertha BSC | 34 | 12 | 12 | 10 | 52 | 48 | +4 | 48 | Qualification to Intertoto Cup third round |
| 7 | Borussia Dortmund | 34 | 11 | 13 | 10 | 45 | 42 | +3 | 46 | |
| 8 | 1. FC Nürnberg | 34 | 12 | 8 | 14 | 49 | 51 | −2 | 44 | |
| 9 | VfB Stuttgart | 34 | 9 | 16 | 9 | 37 | 39 | −2 | 43 | |

Source: kicker.de
Rules for classification: 1) points; 2) goal difference; 3) number of goals scored.

=== DFB-Pokal ===
==== First round ====
| 22 August 2005 | Eintracht Braunschweig | 2 – 1 | Borussia Dortmund | Braunschweig |
| 20:30 | Rische 41'; Graf 84' | report (in German) | Koller 28' | Stadium: Eintracht-Stadion; Attendance: 22.200; Referee: Peter Sippel (Munich) |
