= 1995–96 TSV 1860 Munich season =

TSV 1860 Munich
1995–96 season
- Manager: Werner Lorant
- Stadium: Olympic Stadium
- Bundesliga: 8th
- Top goalscorer: Olaf Bodden (14)

== Season summary ==
1860 Munich built on their solid 14th place the previous season to finish 8th, qualifying for the Intertoto Cup group stage.

== Kit ==
1860 Munich's kit was manufactured by Nike and sponsored by Munich brewery Löwenbräu.

== Players ==
=== First team squad ===
Squad at end of season

Note: Flags indicate national team as defined under FIFA eligibility rules; some limited exceptions apply. Players may hold more than one non-FIFA nationality.

No.	Pos.	Nation	Player
1	GK	GER	Bernd Meier
2	DF	GER	Alexander Kutschera
3	DF	GER	Thomas Miller
4	DF	CRO	Elvis Brajković
5	MF	GER	René Rydlewicz
6	DF	GER	Bernhard Trares
7	MF	GER	Horst Heldt
8	MF	GER	Manfred Schwabl
9	FW	GER	Olaf Bodden
10	MF	POL	Piotr Nowak
11	FW	GER	Bernhard Winkler
12	MF	GER	Rainer Berg
13	MF	AUT	Harald Cerny

No.	Pos.	Nation	Player
14	DF	GER	Thomas Schmidt
15	DF	GER	Holger Greilich
16	MF	GER	Jens Jeremies
17	MF	BUL	Daniel Borimirov
19	MF	GER	Gerhard Schmidt
20	MF	YUG	Miroslav Stević
21	MF	GER	Jens Dowe
22	MF	GER	Matthias Hamann
23	FW	GER	Thorsten Messinger
24	GK	GER	Christian Holzer
26	MF	GER	Manfred Burghartswieser
27	DF	GER	Uwe Wolf

=== Left club during season ===
Note: Flags indicate national team as defined under FIFA eligibility rules; some limited exceptions apply. Players may hold more than one non-FIFA nationality.

No.	Pos.	Nation	Player
13	FW	GER	Guido Erhard (to Wolfsburg)
18	FW	POL	Marek Leśniak (to KFC Uerdingen)

No.	Pos.	Nation	Player
22	DF	GER	Jens Keller (to Wolfsburg)
25	DF	GER	Timur Yanyali (to İstanbulspor)

== Competitions ==
=== Legend ===
Win Draw Loss Postponed

=== Bundesliga ===
==== League table ====
Pos	Team	Pld	W	D	L	GF	GA	GD	Pts	Qualification or relegation
6	Hansa Rostock	34	13	10	11	47	43	+4	49	
7	Karlsruher SC	34	12	12	10	53	47	+6	48	Qualification to Intertoto Cup group stage (Note: As Hansa Rostock did not apply for the UEFA Intertoto Cup, their place was transferred to Stuttgart.)
8	1860 Munich	34	11	12	11	52	46	+6	45	Qualification to Intertoto Cup group stage
9	Werder Bremen	34	10	14	10	39	42	−3	44	Qualification to Intertoto Cup group stage
10	VfB Stuttgart	34	10	13	11	59	62	−3	43	Qualification to Intertoto Cup group stage

Source: www.dfb.de
Rules for classification: 1) points; 2) goal difference; 3) number of goals scored.
