= Pellowski =

Pellowski or Pelowski is a Polish masculine surname, its feminine counterpart is Pellowska or Pelowska. It that may refer to

- Anne Pellowski (1933–2023), Polish American educator and author
- Gene Pelowski (born 1952), American politician
- Jannis Pellowski (born 1992), German football goalkeeper
- Pascal Pellowski (born 1988), German footballer, brother of Jannis
