= Streker =

Streker is a surname. Notable people with the surname include:

- Denis Streker, German footballer
- Stephan Streker, Belgian film director and screenwriter
