= Bentley Baxter Bahn =

German footballer

Baxter Bahn
Personal information
- Full name: Bentley Baxter Bahn
- Date of birth: 28 August 1992 (age 34)
- Place of birth: Hamburg, Germany
- Height: 1.80 m (5 ft 11 in)
- Position: Midfielder

Team information
- Current team: FC Augsburg II
- Number: 17

Youth career
- –2002: SG Elbdeich
- 2002–2011: Hamburger SV

Senior career*
Years	Team	Apps	(Gls)
2010–2013	Hamburger SV II	35	(1)
2013–2014	FC St. Pauli II	28	(8)
2014–2015	FC St. Pauli	3	(0)
2015–2016	Stuttgarter Kickers	29	(2)
2016–2017	FSV Frankfurt	36	(4)
2017–2018	FSV Zwickau	28	(4)
2018–2020	Hallescher FC	71	(13)
2020–2022	Hansa Rostock	63	(8)
2022–2024	Waldhof Mannheim	68	(12)
2024–2025	Alemannia Aachen	56	(6)
2026–	FC Augsburg II	9	(1)
- * Club domestic league appearances and goals as of 24 September 2026

Bentley Baxter Bahn (born 28 August 1992) is a German professional footballer who plays as a midfielder for Regionalliga Bayern side FC Augsburg II.

== Career ==
Bahn was born in Hamburg. He made his league debut for St. Pauli's senior team on 2 August 2014 in a 1–1 home draw with Ingolstadt.

In January 2015 he joined 3. Liga side Stuttgarter Kickers on a permanent basis, signing a contract until 2017. His previous club, FC St. Pauli, though secured themselves a return option for summer 2016. He made his league debut for the club on 28 February 2015 in a 2–0 away victory over Fortuna Köln. He was subbed in for Vincenzo Marchese at halftime. He scored his first competitive goal for the club on 4 April 2015 in a 2–0 home victory over Borussia Dortmund II. His goal, scored in the 86th minute, made the score 2–0 to Stuttgarter Kickers.

In June 2016, Bahn joined 3. Liga club FSV Frankfurt on a two-year contract, arriving alongside Christopher Schorch. He made his competitive debut for the club on 30 July 2016 in a 1–1 away draw with Holstein Kiel. He scored his first competitive goal for the club on 16 October 2016 in a 6–0 home victory over Fortuna Köln. His goal, scored in the 30th minute, made the score 2–0 to FSV Frankfurt.

In September 2017, Bahn was signed by 3. Liga club FSV Zwickau. He made his competitive debut for the club on 8 September 2017 in a 2–0 away victory over Preußen Münster. He scored his first competitive goal for the club on 23 September 2017 in a 1–0 home victory over Werder Bremen II. He scored in the 86th minute.

In July 2018, Bahn moved to Hallescher FC. He made his competitive debut for the club on 28 July 2018 in a 2–0 away defeat to his former club, Zwickau. He scored his first competitive goal for the club on 11 August 2018 in a 2–0 home victory over 1. FC Kaiserslautern. His goal, scored in the 19th minute, came from the penalty spot.

In July 2020 Bahn joined Hansa Rostock on a two-year contract.

In June 2022, Bahn signed with Waldhof Mannheim.

In June 2024, Bahn joined newly promoted 3. Liga club Alemannia Aachen.

On 20 July 2026, he moved to FC Augsburg II, the reserve team of FC Augsburg.

== Personal life ==
He was given two forenames, Bentley and Baxter. However, he has stated, that Baxter is the one by which he is usually called.

== Career statistics ==
As of 1 July 2021

Appearances and goals by club, season and competition
Club	Season	League			Cup		Total	
Club	Season	Division	Apps	Goals	Apps	Goals	Apps	Goals
Hamburger SV II	2010–11	Regionalliga Nord	1	0	0	0	1	0
Hamburger SV II	2011–12	Regionalliga Nord	8	0	0	0	8	0
Hamburger SV II	2012–13	Regionalliga Nord	26	1	0	0	26	1
Hamburger SV II	Total		35	1	0	0	35	1
FC St. Pauli II	2013–14	Regionalliga Nord	15	5	0	0	15	5
FC St. Pauli II	2014–15	Regionalliga Nord	13	3	0	0	13	3
FC St. Pauli II	Total		28	8	0	0	28	8
FC St. Pauli	2014–15	2. Bundesliga	3	0	0	0	3	0
Stuttgarter Kickers	2014–15	3. Liga	9	2	0	0	9	2
Stuttgarter Kickers	2015–16	3. Liga	20	0	1	0	21	0
Stuttgarter Kickers	Total		29	2	1	0	30	2
FSV Frankfurt	2016–17	3. Liga	36	4	1	0	37	4
FSV Zwickau	2017–18	3. Liga	28	4	0	0	28	4
Hallescher FC	2018–19	3. Liga	37	8	0	0	37	8
Hallescher FC	2019–20	3. Liga	34	5	1	0	35	5
Hallescher FC	Total		71	13	1	0	72	13
Hansa Rostock	2020–21	3. Liga	36	7	3	0	39	7
Career total			266	40	6	0	272	40
