= Massimo Ornatelli =

Italian footballer

Personal information
- Date of birth: 17 January 1986 (age 40)
- Place of birth: Rome, Italy
- Height: 1.75 m (5 ft 9 in)
- Position: Attacking midfielder

Youth career
- Eintracht Dortmund
- –2004: Borussia Dortmund

Senior career*
Years	Team	Apps	(Gls)
2004–2005	Borussia Dortmund II	3	(0)
2005–2007	Arminia Bielefeld II	41	(3)
2007–2012	SC Preußen Münster	154	(18)
2012–2013	SC Paderborn 07	6	(0)
2013–2016	VfL Osnabrück	80	(10)
2016–2017	FSV Frankfurt	29	(4)
2017–2019	Borussia Dortmund II	47	(8)
- * Club domestic league appearances and goals as of 23:40, 18 July 2019 (UTC)

Massimo Ornatelli (born 17 January 1986) is an Italian footballer who most recently played for Borussia Dortmund II.

== Personal life ==
Ornatelli was born in Rome to an Italian father and German mother, and moved to Dortmund at a young age.
