= Jules Schwadorf =

German footballer

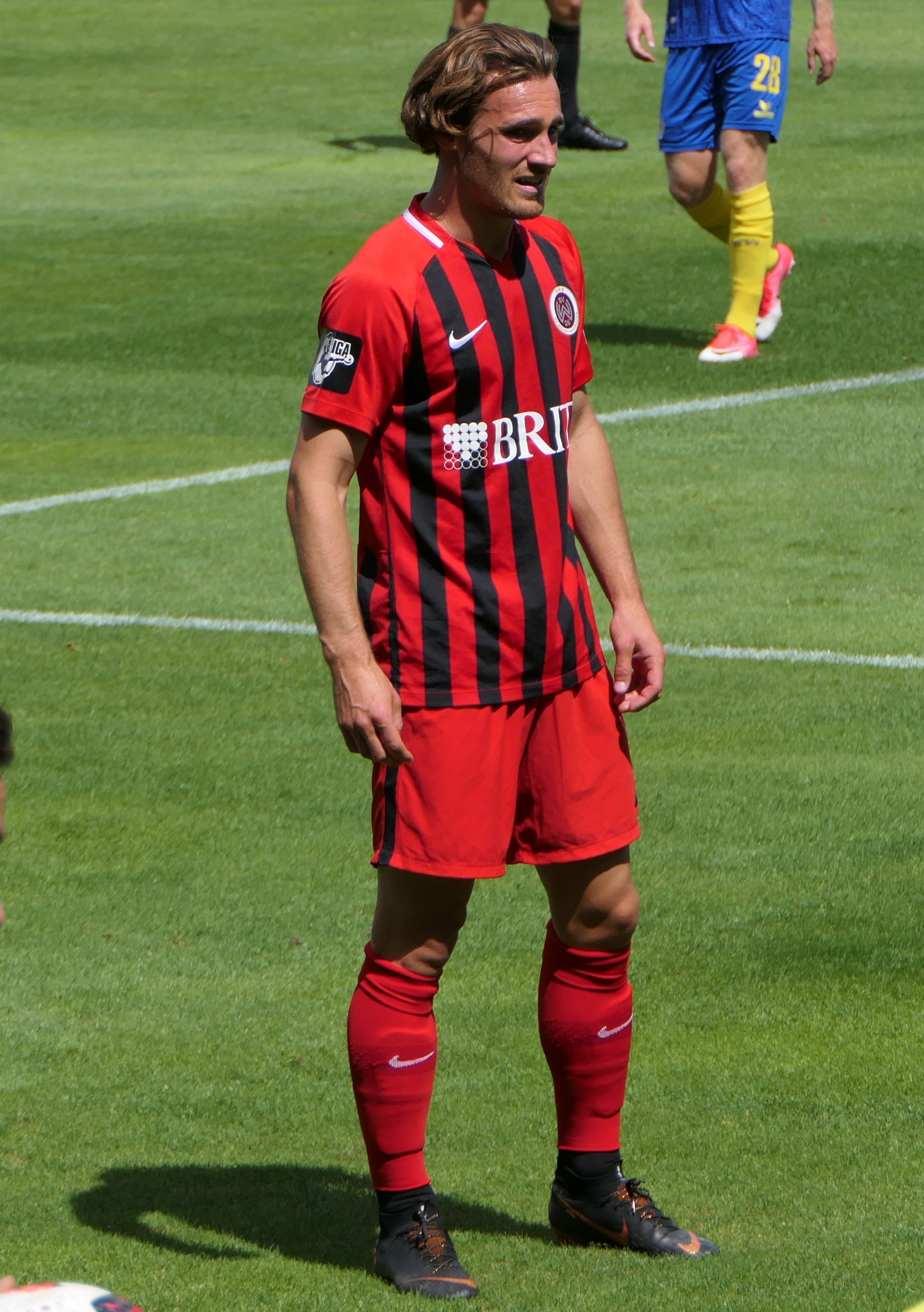
- Schwadorf with Wehen Wiesbaden in August 2018

Personal information
- Date of birth: 19 October 1992 (age 34)
- Place of birth: Germany
- Height: 1.77 m (5 ft 10 in)
- Position: Midfielder

Team information
- Current team: Fortuna Köln
- Number: 19

Youth career
- SV Weiden
- Grün-Weiß Brauweiler
- –2008: 1. FC Köln
- 2008–2009: SF Troisdorf
- 2009–2011: Bayer Leverkusen

Senior career*
Years	Team	Apps	(Gls)
2011–2013	Bayer Leverkusen II	0	(0)
2012–2013	→ Fortuna Düsseldorf II (loan)	29	(3)
2013–2014	1899 Hoffenheim II	6	(0)
2014–2015	SG Wattenscheid 09	17	(4)
2015–2016	Viktoria Köln	31	(7)
2016–2020	Wehen Wiesbaden	59	(3)
2020–2022	Preußen Münster	41	(6)
2022–	Fortuna Köln	7	(0)
- * Club domestic league appearances and goals as of 10 November 2022

Jules Schwadorf (born 19 October 1992) is a German professional footballer who plays as a midfielder for Fortuna Köln.
