= Bernd Meier =

German footballer (1972–2012)

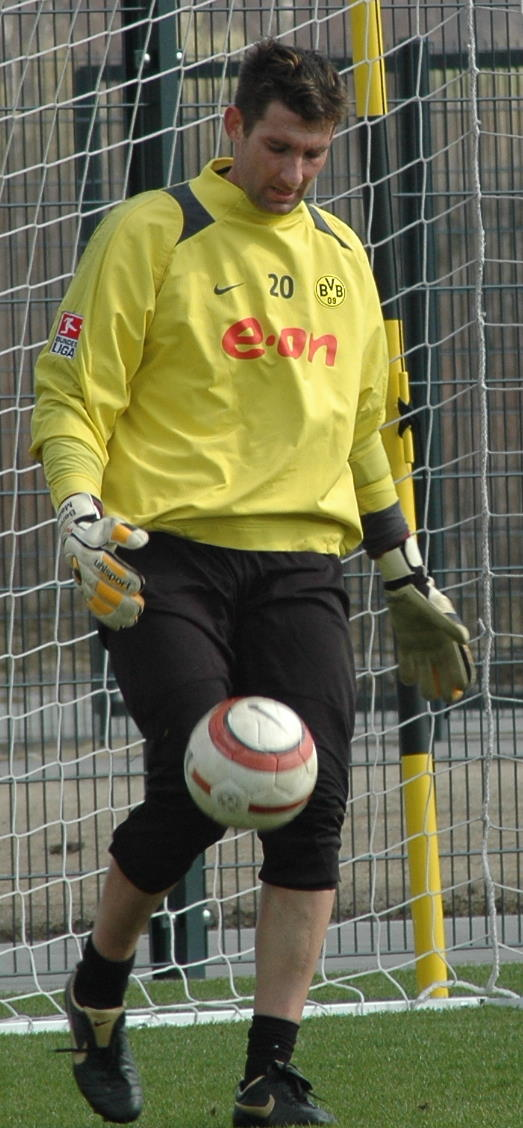
- Meier in 2006

Personal information
- Date of birth: 11 February 1972
- Place of birth: Rain, West Germany
- Date of death: 2 August 2012 (aged 40)
- Place of death: Burgheim, Germany
- Height: 1.93 m (6 ft 4 in)
- Position: Goalkeeper

Youth career
- TSV Rain am Lech
- TSV Burgheim

Senior career*
Years	Team	Apps	(Gls)
–1993	TSV Aindling		
1993–1999	1860 Munich	93	(0)
1999–2002	Borussia Mönchengladbach	2	(0)
2002–2005	Rot Weiss Ahlen	84	(0)
2005–2007	Borussia Dortmund	0	(0)
Total		179	(0)
- * Club domestic league appearances and goals

Bernd Meier (11 February 1972 – 2 August 2012) was a German professional footballer who played as a goalkeeper.

== Playing career ==
Born in Rain, Swabia, Meier arrived at the professional level at the age of 21, joining TSV 1860 Munich and promoting to the Bundesliga in his first year. During his subsequent four-season spell with the Löwen (lions), he continued to battle for first-choice status with Rainer Berg, appearing in a career-best 33 games in 1995–96 to help his team to the eighth position.

In summer 1999, Meier signed with Borussia Mönchengladbach, playing in only two league matches during his stint, one in each major level of German football. After three years he returned to the second division, going on to start for Rot Weiss Ahlen.

Meier moved to Borussia Dortmund in 2005, at the age of 33, being only third-choice over the course of two seasons, and inclusively being demoted to the reserves. He retired with 94 top level games to his credit.

== Coaching career ==
On 6 January 2010, Meier was named as the new goalkeeper coach of SV Wacker Burghausen.

The following year, in the same capacity, he joined the Germany under-17 team.

== Death ==
Meier died on 2 August 2012 of an apparent heart attack, after being admitted to the hospital for food poisoning. He was only 40 years of age.

== Career statistics ==
Appearances and goals by club, season and competition
Club	Season	League			DFB-Pokal		Europe		Total	
Club	Season	League	Apps	Goals	Apps	Goals	Apps	Goals	Apps	Goals
1860 Munich	1993–94	2. Bundesliga	0	0	0	0	—		0	0
1860 Munich	1994–95	Bundesliga	26	0	3	0	—		29	0
1860 Munich	1995–96	Bundesliga	33	0	3	0	—		36	0
1860 Munich	1996–97	Bundesliga	11	0	2	0	2	0	15	0
1860 Munich	1997–98	Bundesliga	23	0	2	0	3	0	28	0
1860 Munich	1998–99	Bundesliga	0	0	0	0	—		0	0
1860 Munich	Total		93	0	10	0	5	0	108	0
Borussia Mönchengladbach	1999–2000	2. Bundesliga	0	0	0	0	—		0	0
Borussia Mönchengladbach	2000–01	2. Bundesliga	1	0	0	0	—		1	0
Borussia Mönchengladbach	2001–02	Bundesliga	1	0	0	0	—		1	0
Borussia Mönchengladbach	Total		2	0	0	0	—		2	0
Rot Weiss Ahlen	2002–03	2. Bundesliga	31	0	2	0	—		33	0
Rot Weiss Ahlen	2003–04	2. Bundesliga	25	0	1	0	—		26	0
Rot Weiss Ahlen	2004–05	2. Bundesliga	28	0	3	0	—		31	0
Rot Weiss Ahlen	Total		84	0	6	0	—		90	0
Borussia Dortmund	2005–06	Bundesliga	0	0	0	0	0	0	0	0
Borussia Dortmund	2006–07	Bundesliga	0	0	0	0	0	0	0	0
Borussia Dortmund	Total		0	0	0	0	0	0	0	0
Career total			179	0	16	0	5	0	200	0
