= Robert Berger (footballer) =

Professional footballer

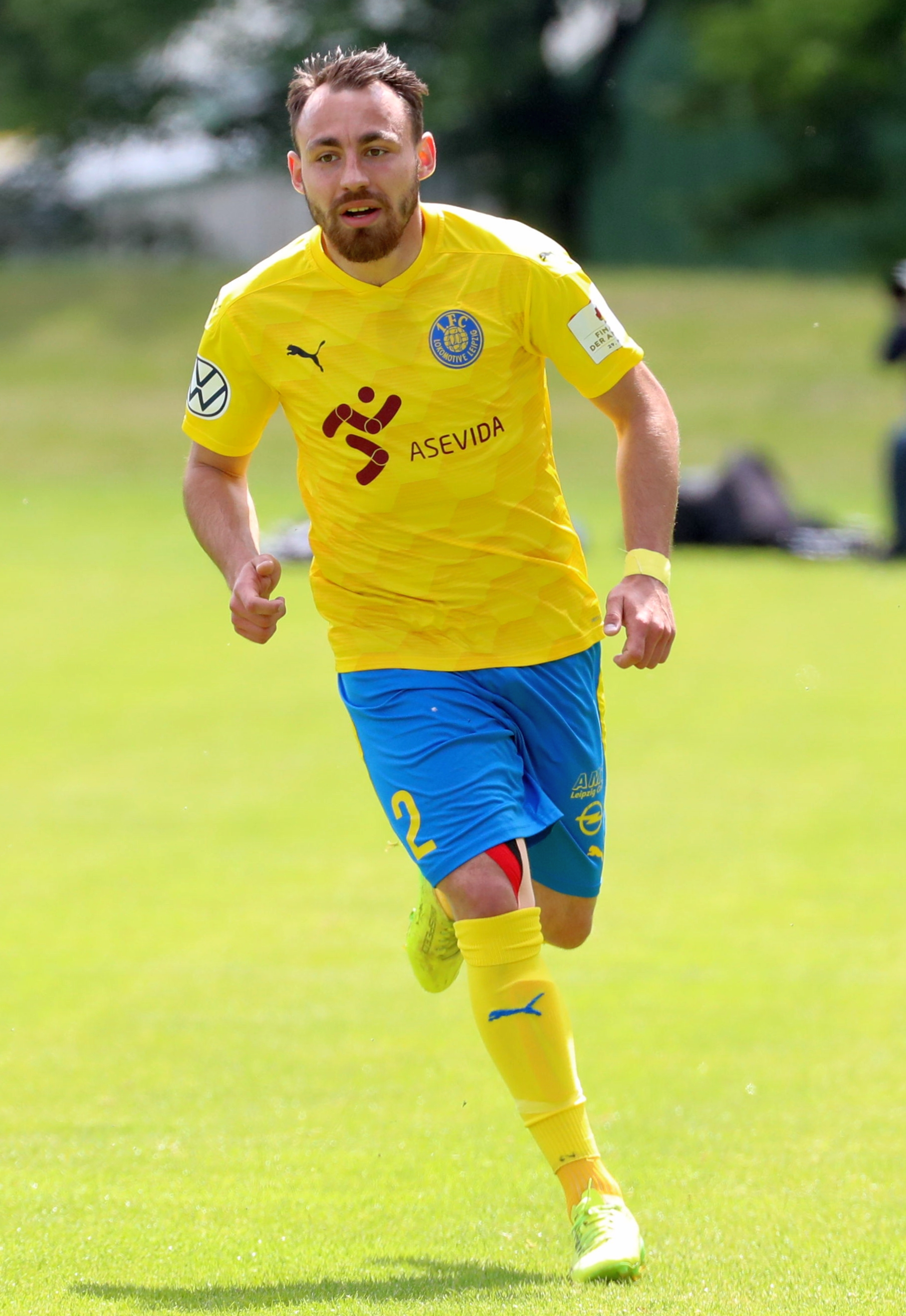

Personal information
- Date of birth: 7 November 1996 (age 30)
- Place of birth: Bad Muskau, Germany
- Height: 1.82 m (6 ft 0 in)
- Position: Right back

Team information
- Current team: Hallescher FC
- Number: 2

Youth career
- 2003–2010: KSV Weißwasser
- 2010–2013: Energie Cottbus

Senior career*
Years	Team	Apps	(Gls)
2013–2015	Energie Cottbus	27	(1)
2016–2017	FSV Zwickau	31	(1)
2017–2022	1. FC Lokomotive Leipzig	111	(1)
2022–2024	Chemnitzer FC	43	(0)
2024–	Hallescher FC	31	(1)

International career^{‡}
2012–2013	Germany U17	11	(0)
2015	Kazakhstan U21	1	(0)
- * Club domestic league appearances and goals as of 23 September 2026 ‡ National team caps and goals as of 4 June 2015

Robert Berger (born 7 November 1996) is a professional footballer who plays as a right back for Hallescher FC in the Regionalliga Nordost. Born in Germany, he has represented both Germany and Kazakhstan at youth level.

== Club career ==
Berger is a youth exponent from Energie Cottbus. He made his 2. Bundesliga debut at 11 May 2014 against FC Ingolstadt 04. He replaced Erik Jendrišek after 70 minutes in a 2–0 away defeat.

== Career statistics ==
=== Club ===
As of 23 September 2026

Appearances and goals by club, season and competition
Club	Season	League			National Cup		Total	
Club	Season	Division	Apps	Goals	Apps	Goals	Apps	Goals
Energie Cottbus	2013-14	2. Bundesliga	1	0	—		1	0
Energie Cottbus	2014-15	3. Liga	19	1	1	0	20	1
Energie Cottbus	2015-16	3. Liga	7	0	0	0	7	0
Energie Cottbus	Total		27	1	1	0	28	1
FSV Zwickau	2015-16	Regionalliga	18	1	—		18	1
FSV Zwickau	2016-17	3. Liga	13	0	0	0	13	0
FSV Zwickau	Total		31	1	0	0	31	1
Lokomotive Leipzig	2017-18	Regionalliga	31	0	—		31	0
Lokomotive Leipzig	2018-19	Regionalliga	20	0	—		20	0
Lokomotive Leipzig	2019-20	Regionalliga	20	0	—		20	0
Lokomotive Leipzig	2020-21	Regionalliga	7	0	—		7	0
Lokomotive Leipzig	2021-22	Regionalliga	34	1	1	0	35	1
Lokomotive Leipzig	Total		112	1	1	0	113	1
Chemnitzer FC	2022-23	Regionalliga	30	0	1	0	31	0
Chemnitzer FC	2023-24	Regionalliga	13	0	—		13	0
Chemnitzer FC	Total		43	0	1	0	44	0
Hallescher FC	2024-25	Regionalliga	24	1	1	0	25	1
Hallescher FC	2025-26	Regionalliga	5	0	0	0	5	0
Hallescher FC	2025-26	Regionalliga	2	0	0	0	2	0
Hallescher FC	Total		31	1	1	0	32	1
Career Total			244	4	4	0	248	4
