= Christopher Schorch =

German footballer

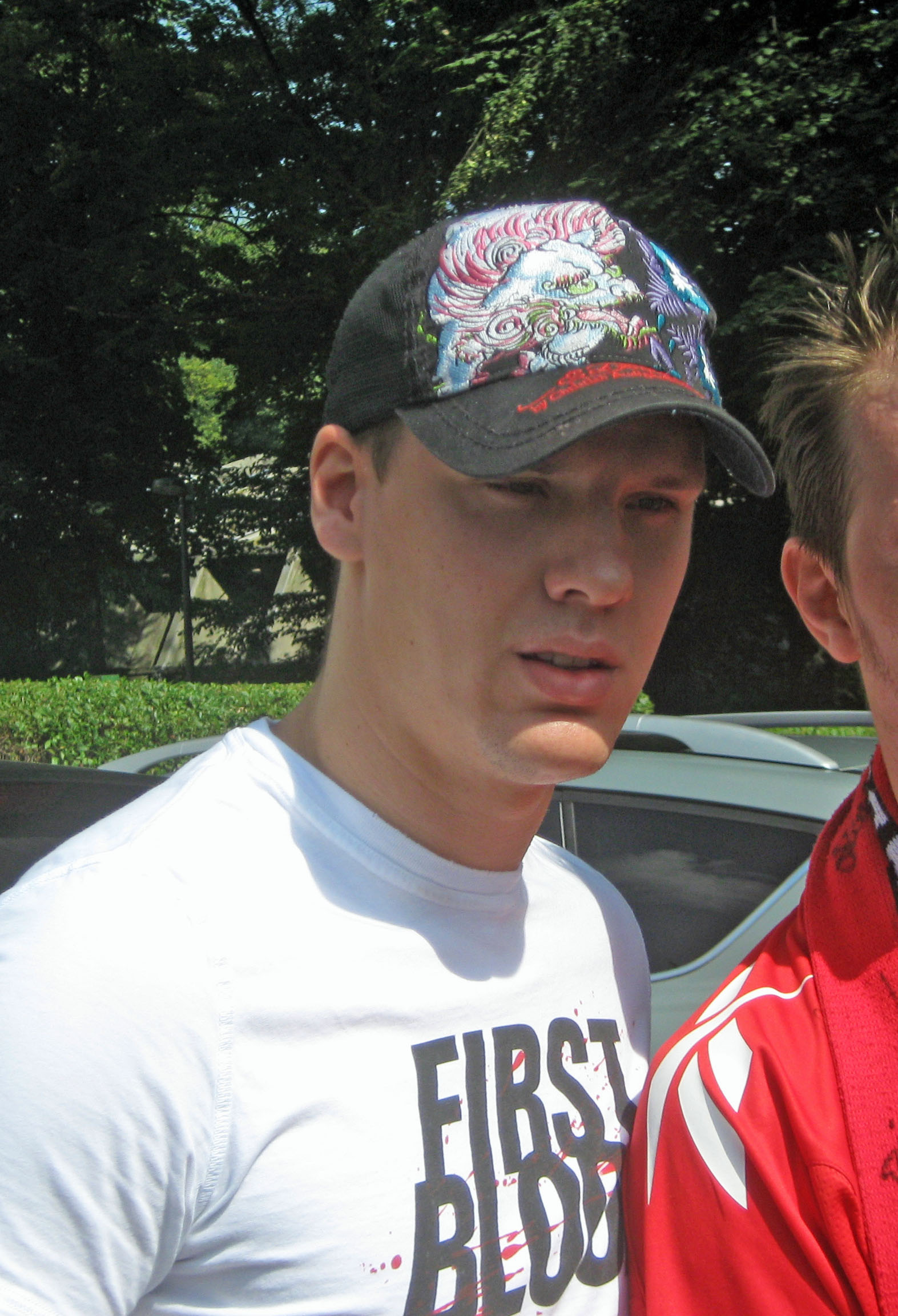
- Schorch in 2010

Personal information
- Date of birth: 30 January 1989 (age 37)
- Place of birth: Halle, East Germany
- Height: 1.90 m (6 ft 3 in)
- Position: Centre-back

Youth career
- Nietlebener SV Askania 09
- –2004: Hallescher FC
- 2004–2007: Hertha BSC

Senior career*
Years	Team	Apps	(Gls)
2006–2007	Hertha BSC II	18	(0)
2007	Hertha BSC	2	(0)
2007–2009	Real Madrid B	27	(0)
2009–2013	1. FC Köln	21	(1)
2010–2013	→ 1. FC Köln II	10	(1)
2011–2012	→ Energie Cottbus (loan)	10	(0)
2014	VfL Bochum II	15	(2)
2014–2015	MSV Duisburg	24	(0)
2015–2016	Energie Cottbus	23	(2)
2016–2017	FSV Frankfurt	27	(0)
2017–2019	KFC Uerdingen 05	54	(5)
2019–2021	1. FC Saarbrücken	18	(0)
2021–2022	Wuppertaler SV	9	(0)
Total		258	(11)

International career
2005	Germany U16	1	(0)
2005–2007	Germany U17	16	(4)
2007–2008	Germany U19	4	(0)
2007–2010	Germany U20	4	(0)
- * Club domestic league appearances and goals

Christopher Schorch (born 30 January 1989) is a German former professional footballer who played as a centre-back.

== Career ==
Schorch came through the ranks of Hertha BSC, and made his Bundesliga debut in the closing stages of the 2006–07 season. In July 2007, he signed with Real Madrid for €600,000, being assigned to its B side, which had been freshly relegated to the third division.

After two years in Spain, Schorch returned to Germany and signed a four-year contract with 1. FC Köln, the transfer fee was believed to be €1 million.

He joined MSV Duisburg for the 2014–15 season. At the end of season, Duisburg achieved promotion to 2. Bundesliga, however with Schorch not becoming a regular, starting only in 13 matches and being benched for 20 times. Accordingly, he did not receive an extension of his contract and remained a free agent until October when he was signed by his former club Energie Cottbus for the remainder of the 3. Liga season.

In January 2019, Schorch was one of two players to be suspended by KFC Uerdingen 05 for "disciplinary reasons". On 1 May 2019, it was confirmed, that Schorch would join 1. FC Saarbrücken for the 2019–20 season on a two-year deal.

In March 2022, Schorch agreed the termination of his contract with Regionalliga side Wuppertaler SV following a lengthy injury. Shortly afterwards, he announced his retirement from playing.

== Career statistics ==
As of matches played on 19 December 2018

Appearances and goals by club, season and competition
Club	Season	League			Cup^{1}		Total		Ref.
Club	Season	Division	Apps	Goals	Apps	Goals	Apps	Goals	Ref.
Hertha BSC	2006–07	Bundesliga	2	0	0	0	2	0	
Hertha BSC II	2006–07	Regionalliga Nord	18	0	—		18	0	
Real Madrid B	2007–08	Segunda División B	12	0	—		12	0	
Real Madrid B	2008–09	Segunda División B	15	0	—		15	0	
Real Madrid B	Total		27	0	—		27	0	—
1. FC Köln	2009–10	Bundesliga	17	1	1	0	18	1	
1. FC Köln	2010–11	Bundesliga	4	0	0	0	4	0	
1. FC Köln	Total		21	1	1	0	22	0	—
1. FC Köln II	2010–11	Regionalliga West	3	0	—		3	0	
1. FC Köln II	2011–12	Regionalliga West	1	0	—		1	0	
1. FC Köln II	2012–13	Regionalliga West	7	1	—		7	1	
1. FC Köln II	Total		11	1	—		11	1	—
Energie Cottbus (loan)	2011–12	2. Bundesliga	10	0	0	0	10	0	
VfL Bochum II	2013–14	Regionalliga West	15	2	—		15	2	
MSV Duisburg	2014–15	3. Liga	24	0	—		24	0	
MSV Duisburg II	2014–15	Oberliga Niederrhein	1	0	—		1	0	
Energie Cottbus	2015–16	3. Liga	23	2	—		23	2	
FSV Frankfurt	2016–17	3. Liga	27	0	1	0	28	0	
KFC Uerdingen	2017–18	Regionalliga West	34	3	—		34	3	
KFC Uerdingen	2018–19	Regionalliga West	17	1	—		17	1	
KFC Uerdingen	Total		51	4	—		51	4	—
Career total			230	10	2	0	232	10	—

- 1.Includes DFB-Pokal and Copa del Rey.
