= Holger Greilich =

German footballer (born 1971)

Personal information
- Date of birth: 12 July 1971 (age 55)
- Place of birth: Mainz, West Germany
- Height: 1.88 m (6 ft 2 in)
- Position: Defender

Youth career
- 1976–1984: TV 1817 Mainz
- 1984–1989: MTV 1817 Mainz

Senior career*
Years	Team	Apps	(Gls)
1989–1991	SpVgg Ingelheim		
1991–1995	Mainz 05	92	(0)
1995–2002	1860 Munich	114	(2)
2002–2003	AC Omonia	16	(0)
2003–2004	1. FC Saarbrücken	3	(0)
Total		225	(2)

International career
2000	Germany B	1	(0)
- * Club domestic league appearances and goals

Holger Greilich (born 12 July 1971) is a German former professional footballer who played as a defender. He played from 1989 to 2004, and made one appearance for the Germany B team.
