= Çağatay Kader =

German footballer

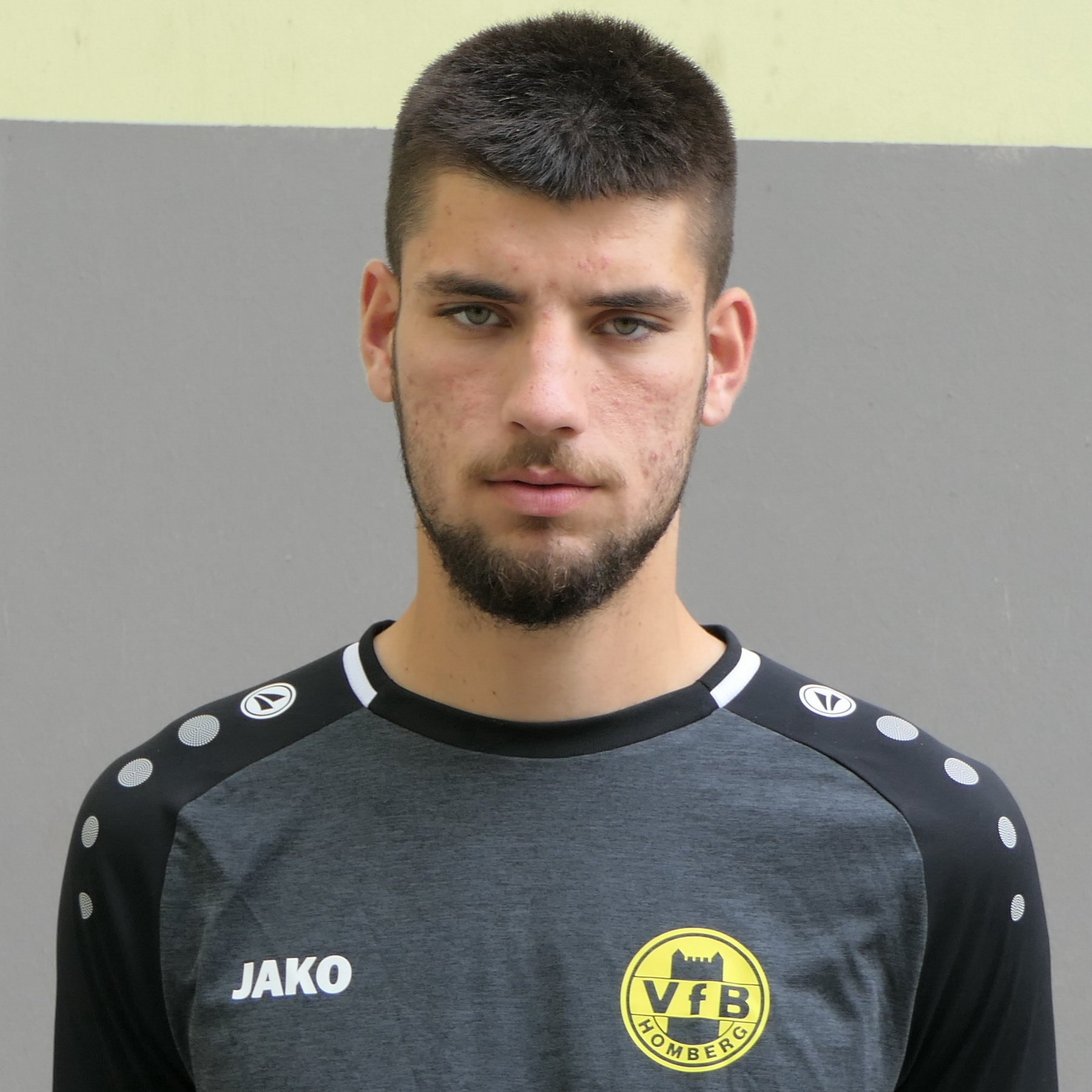
- Kader in 2019

Personal information
- Date of birth: 25 February 1997 (age 29)
- Place of birth: Düsseldorf, Germany
- Height: 1.90 m (6 ft 3 in)
- Position: Forward

Team information
- Current team: Bonner SC
- Number: 9

Youth career
- SV Wersten
- –2007: VfB Solingen
- 2007–2010: Fortuna Düsseldorf
- 2010–2011: Bayer Leverkusen
- 2011–2012: Schalke 04
- 2012–2013: Rot-Weiss Essen
- 2013–2016: VfL Bochum

Senior career*
Years	Team	Apps	(Gls)
2014–2016	VfL Bochum	0	(0)
2015	→ VfL Bochum II	1	(0)
2016–2017	FSV Frankfurt	32	(6)
2017–2018	VfR Aalen	5	(1)
2018–2019	Anadolu Selçukspor	23	(5)
2019–2020	VfB Homberg	23	(6)
2020–2022	SV 19 Straelen	67	(26)
2022–2024	Borussia Mönchengladbach II	52	(8)
2024–2026	Sportfreunde Siegen	56	(20)
2026–	Bonner SC	7	(1)

International career
2014	Germany U18	2	(0)
2016	Germany U20	2	(0)
- * Club domestic league appearances and goals as of 24 June 2026

Çağatay Kader (born 25 February 1997) is a German footballer who plays as a forward for Bonner SC in Regionalliga West.

He has been a youth international for Germany, earning caps for the U18 and U20 team.
