= Nico Hillenbrand =

German footballer

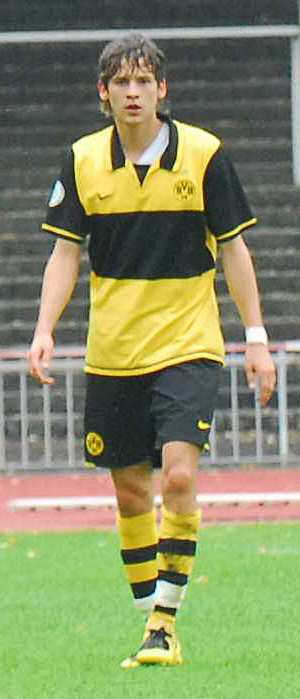
- Hillenbrand in 2007

Personal information
- Date of birth: 25 May 1987 (age 39)
- Place of birth: Heidelberg, West Germany
- Height: 1.82 m (6 ft 0 in)
- Position: Defender

Team information
- Current team: Astoria Walldorf
- Number: 25

Youth career
- VfB Rauenberg
- SV Sandhausen
- –2002: Karlsruher SC
- 2002–2006: Borussia Dortmund

Senior career*
| Years | Team | Apps | (Gls) |
| 2006–2009 | Borussia Dortmund II | 112 | (1) |
| 2007 | Borussia Dortmund | 1 | (0) |
| 2009–2011 | SV Sandhausen | 35 | (1) |
| 2012– | Astoria Walldorf | 228 | (32) |
| 2015–2016 | → SC Hauenstein (loan) | 31 | (6) |

International career
| | Germany U-19 | 1 | (0) |
- * Club domestic league appearances and goals as of 1 March 2021

Nico Hillenbrand (born 25 May 1987) is a German former footballer who played for FC Astoria Walldorf as a defender.

== Career ==
Hillenbrand was born in Heidelberg. He made his debut for the main Borussia Dortmund squad on 15 December 2007, when he came on as a substitute for Nelson Haedo Valdez in a game against VfL Wolfsburg. On 21 May 2009, he announced the return to his former club SV Sandhausen.

== Honours ==
- DFB-Pokal finalist: 2007–08
