= Fabian Graudenz =

German footballer

Personal information
- Full name: Fabian Friedemann Graudenz
- Date of birth: 16 January 1992 (age 34)
- Place of birth: Hamburg, Germany
- Height: 1.81 m (5 ft 11 in)
- Position: Midfielder

Team information
- Current team: TuS Dassendorf

Youth career
- –2006: Blau-Weiß Schenefeld
- 2006–2011: Hamburger SV

Senior career*
| Years | Team | Apps | (Gls) |
| 2011–2013 | Hamburger SV II | 48 | (8) |
| 2013–2014 | FC St. Pauli II | 33 | (8) |
| 2014–2016 | Alemannia Aachen | 67 | (19) |
| 2015 | → Alemannia Aachen II | 1 | (0) |
| 2016–2017 | FSV Frankfurt | 26 | (3) |
| 2018–2019 | Energie Cottbus | 9 | (0) |
| 2019–2020 | Weiche Flensburg | 18 | (2) |
| 2021–2022 | 1. FC Phönix Lübeck | 24 | (12) |
| 2022–2024 | FC Teutonia Ottensen | 54 | (9) |
| 2024– | TuS Dassendorf | 0 | (0) |
- * Club domestic league appearances and goals as of 26 July 2024

Fabian Friedemann Graudenz (born 16 January 1992) is a German footballer who plays as a midfielder for TuS Dassendorf.
