= Shawn Barry =

Puerto Rican footballer (born 1990)

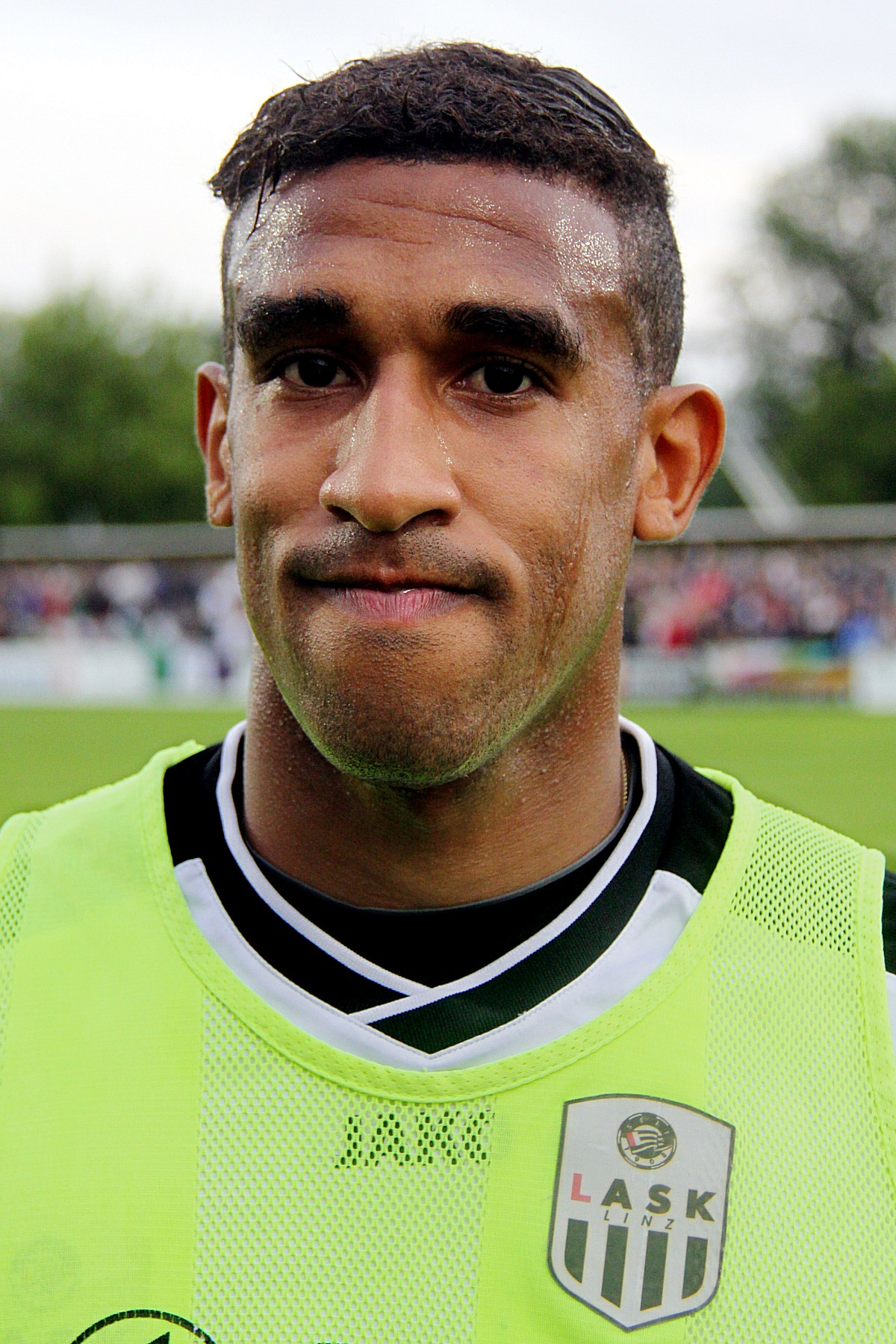
- Barry with LASK Linz in 2014

Personal information
- Full name: Shawn Maurice Barry
- Date of birth: April 23, 1990 (age 36)
- Place of birth: Miramar, Florida, U.S.
- Height: 1.83 m (6 ft 0 in)
- Position: Defender

College career
Years	Team	Apps	(Gls)
2008–2009	Virginia Cavaliers	45	(0)

Senior career*
Years	Team	Apps	(Gls)
2010	Fort Lauderdale Schulz Academy	3	(0)
2010–2012	LASK Juniors	31	(4)
2011–2015	LASK	86	(8)
2015–2017	FSV Frankfurt	56	(2)
2017	Korona Kielce	5	(0)
2018	Real Salt Lake	4	(0)
2018	→ Real Monarchs (loan)	1	(0)
2019	Tampa Bay Rowdies	15	(1)
Total		201	(15)

International career
2018–2019	Puerto Rico	4	(0)
- * Club domestic league appearances and goals

Shawn Maurice Barry (born April 23, 1990) is a Puerto Rican former professional footballer who played as a defender. Born in the continental United States, Barry represented the Puerto Rica national team.

== Professional ==
Barry made three appearances in the USL Premier Developmental League for Fort Lauderdale Schulz Academy in mid-2010. Barry joined LASK Linz in July 2010. He made his full debut on May 22, 2011, in a 1–0 loss to Wacker Innsbruck. After winning the three league championships in Austria in five years, 2015 saw Barry move to Germany's 2nd division as he signed for FSV Frankfurt.

On July 8, 2017, he signed a contract with Korona Kielce.

He was released during the winter break and returned to his native United States with Real Salt Lake ahead of the 2018 Major League Soccer season. Barry was released by Salt Lake at the end of their 2018 season.

On February 1, 2019, Barry signed his first professional contract with a team in his home state of Florida by joining the Tampa Bay Rowdies.

== International ==
In August 2018, Barry was called up by new head coach Amado Guevara to the Puerto Rico national football team for the CONCACAF Nations League qualifying against St. Kitts and Nevis. He got his first international cap on September 9, 2018.
