= Denis Streker =

German footballer

Personal information
- Date of birth: 6 April 1991 (age 35)
- Place of birth: Mainz, Germany
- Height: 1.84 m (6 ft 0 in)
- Position: Midfielder

Team information
- Current team: Eintracht Frankfurt II
- Number: 18

Youth career
- FSV Oppenheim
- SV Guntersblum
- –2008: SV Gonsenheim
- 2008–2009: SV Wehen Wiesbaden

Senior career*
Years	Team	Apps	(Gls)
2009–2011	SV Wehen Wiesbaden II	44	(3)
2011–2012	Eintracht Frankfurt II	32	(3)
2012–2014	TSG 1899 Hoffenheim II	35	(1)
2012–2014	TSG 1899 Hoffenheim	4	(0)
2013	→ Dynamo Dresden (loan)	10	(0)
2014–2016	SV Ried	39	(1)
2016–2017	FSV Frankfurt	32	(1)
2018	TSV Schott Mainz	11	(1)
2018–2022	SC Hessen Dreieich	73	(18)
2022–	Eintracht Frankfurt II	3	(1)
- * Club domestic league appearances and goals as of 12 November 2022

Denis Streker (born 6 April 1991) is a German footballer who plays for Eintracht Frankfurt II as a midfielder.
