= Sören Pirson =

German footballer

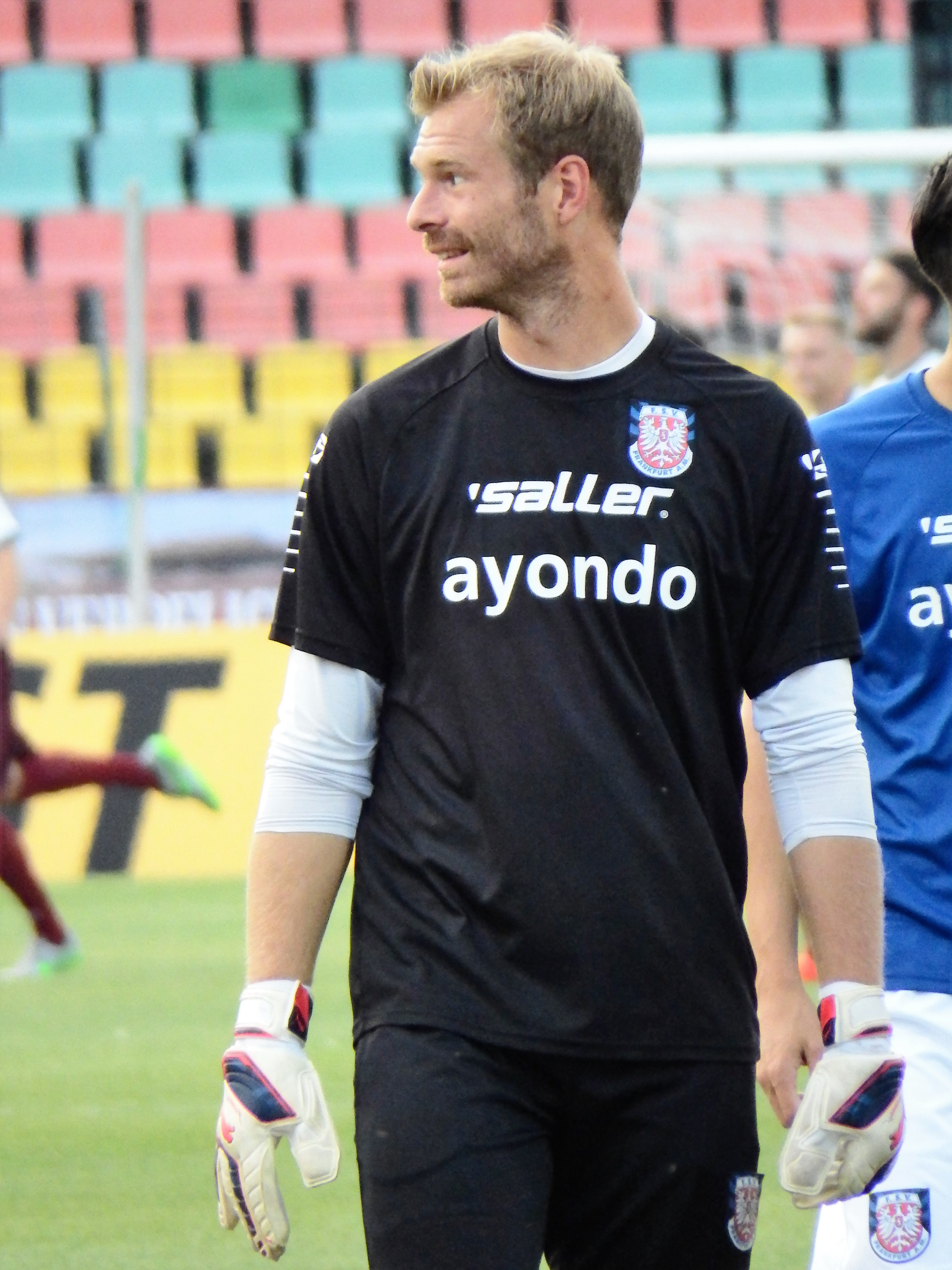
- Pirson in 2015

Personal information
- Date of birth: 27 August 1985 (age 41)
- Place of birth: Essen, West Germany
- Height: 1.94 m (6 ft 4 in)
- Position: Goalkeeper

Youth career
- 1992–1997: SV Burgaltendorf
- 1997–1998: Schwarz-Weiss Essen
- 1998–1999: Rot-Weiß Oberhausen
- 1999–2002: Fortuna Düsseldorf
- 2002–2004: Borussia Dortmund

Senior career*
Years	Team	Apps	(Gls)
2004–2007	Borussia Dortmund II	54	(0)
2006–2007	Borussia Dortmund	1	(0)
2007–2008	Rot-Weiss Essen	2	(0)
2008–2011	Rot-Weiß Oberhausen	81	(0)
2011–2012	Ergotelis	20	(0)
2012–2017	FSV Frankfurt	37	(0)
Total		195	(0)

International career
2005	Germany U20	4	(0)
- * Club domestic league appearances and goals

Sören Pirson (born 27 August 1985) is a German former professional footballer who played as a goalkeeper.

== Career ==
=== Borussia Dortmund ===
In his youth, Pirson played at the suburban club SV Burgaltendorf in Essen, at Schwarz-Weiß Essen, Rot-Weiß Oberhausen and Fortuna Düsseldorf. For the 2002–03 season, Pirson moved to Borussia Dortmund's youth academy. In 2004, Pirson was promoted to the second team of the club, Borussia Dortmund II. After a cruciate ligament rupture suffered by backup goalkeeper of the first team, Bernd Meier, Pirson moved up as the third goalkeeper in Dortmund's professional squad for the 2005–06 season. From the 2006–07 season he became the backup to Roman Weidenfeller. Pirson's only appearance for the first team came in October 2006 in the DFB-Pokal game in the second round against Hannover 96, when regular goalkeeper Weidenfeller was sent off after a handball outside the penalty area. In addition, he was still playing with the second team, which competed in the Regionalliga Nord. Pirson grew into a fan favourite among Borussia supporters due to his down to earth demeanor and interest in the fan scene.

=== Rot-Weiss Essen and Rot-Weiß Oberhausen ===
For the 2007–08 season, Pirson moved to Rot-Weiss Essen, who had recently suffered relegation from the 2. Bundesliga. He was in the starting lineup on the first matchday of the season, but lost his spot in goal after a 1–4 defeat against Rot-Weiß Oberhausen to Daniel Masuch and did not make another league appearance for the team. After missing out on promotion to the 3. Liga, he was signed by recently promoted 2. Bundesliga club Rot-Weiß Oberhausen. There, he made his professional debut on 23 November 2008, when he came on as a substitute for Christoph Semmler in the 74th minute in a game against SV Wehen Wiesbaden. Afterwards, he grew into a regular starter for the club. After the team relegated following the 2010–11 season, his contract was not extended.

=== Ergotelis ===
In 2011, after leaving Rot-Weiß Oberhausen, Pirson signed with Greek club Ergotelis where he immediately became the starting goalkeeper. During the season, he lost his regular place in goal. At the end of the season, the club suffered relegation from the Super League Greece.

=== FSV Frankfurt ===
Ahead of the 2012–13 season, the German 2. Bundesliga club FSV Frankfurt announced that they had signed Pirson on a two-year contract, where he was set to replace the outgoing substitute goalkeeper Michael Langer, who had left the club. As expected, Pirson was the backup behind Patric Klandt at FSV, but was allowed to make one 2. Bundesliga appearance in the last game of the 2012–13 season away against Eintracht Braunschweig, which ended in a 2–2 draw. Two more appearances followed in the 2013–14 season. In the 2015–16 season Pirson relegated as part of FSV without making a single appearance, as the team finish second from bottom in the league table. His contract was nevertheless extended, and he grew into the starting goalkeeper during the 2016–17 season in the 3. Liga, making 34 appearances. Nevertheless, FSV Frankfurt suffered relegation again, finishing bottom of the table in the league, which meant that the club found itself in the fourth-tier Regionalliga Südwest. Pirson's contract was not extended upon relegation.

== Personal life ==
In July 2015, Pirson and his FSV Frankfurt teammate Denis Epstein were nominated for the XY Prize for Civil Courage, intervening as a man was attacked in the Frankfurt U-Bahn.
