= Rainer Berg =

German footballer

Personal information
- Date of birth: 21 August 1965 (age 61)
- Place of birth: Munich, West Germany
- Height: 1.93 m (6 ft 4 in)
- Position: Goalkeeper

Senior career*
Years	Team	Apps	(Gls)
1984–1985	Bayern Munich II		
1985–1990	Darmstadt 98	77	(0)
1990–1997	1860 Munich		
1997	1. FC Nürnberg	5	(0)
2000–2001	Jahn Regensburg		

International career
1987	Germany U21	1	(0)

Managerial career
- 2004–2011: SpVgg Unterhaching (goalkeeper coach)
- * Club domestic league appearances and goals

Rainer Berg (born 21 August 1965) is a German former professional footballer who played as a goalkeeper.
