= Kosi Saka =

DR Congo footballer (born 1986)

Personal information
- Date of birth: 4 February 1986 (age 40)
- Place of birth: Kinshasa, Zaire
- Height: 1.73 m (5 ft 8 in)
- Position: Midfielder

Youth career
- SV Gadderbaum
- –2000: Arminia Bielefeld
- 2000–2005: Borussia Dortmund

Senior career*
Years	Team	Apps	(Gls)
2005–2007	Borussia Dortmund	11	(0)
2007–2009	Hamburger SV	0	(0)
2008	→ Carl Zeiss Jena (loan)	7	(0)
2010–2014	KFC Uerdingen	130	(13)
2014–2024	Sportfreunde Baumberg	165	(20)
Total		313	(33)

International career
2008	DR Congo	3	(0)
- * Club domestic league appearances and goals

Kosi Saka (born 4 February 1986) is a Congolese former professional footballer who played as a midfielder. He made three appearances for the DR Congo national team in 2008.

== Club career ==
In the 2006–07 season, Saka played for Carl Zeiss Jena on loan from Hamburger SV. After being released by Hamburger SV in July 2009, he spent a half year without a club, and on 10 January 2010, he signed for KFC Uerdingen.

== International career ==
Born in Zaire, Saka earned three caps for the DR Congo national team.
