= Markus Brzenska =

German footballer and coach

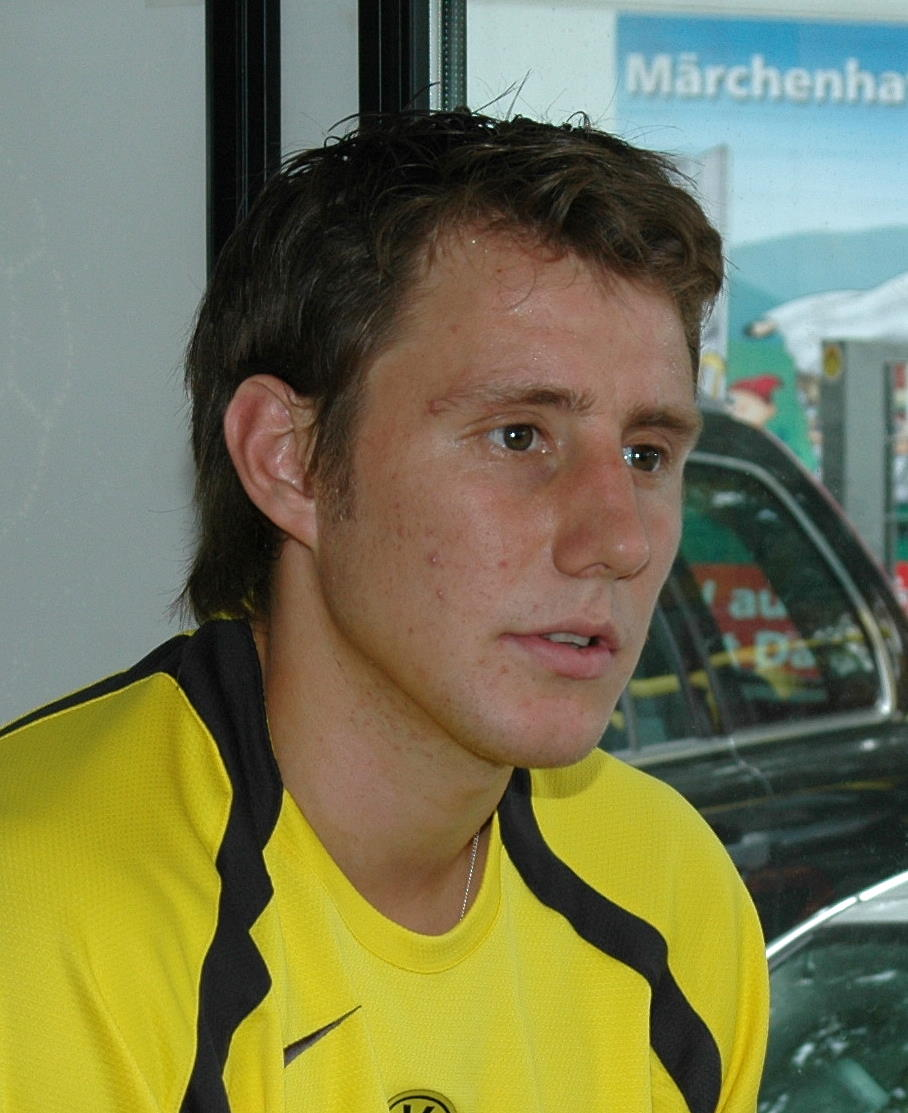
- Brzenska with Borussia Dortmund in 2006

Personal information
- Date of birth: 25 May 1984 (age 42)
- Place of birth: Lünen, West Germany
- Height: 1.96 m (6 ft 5 in)
- Position: Defender

Youth career
- –1993: BV Lünen 05
- 1993–2003: Borussia Dortmund

Senior career*
Years	Team	Apps	(Gls)
2003–2009	Borussia Dortmund II	57	(4)
2003–2009	Borussia Dortmund	86	(6)
2008–2009	→ MSV Duisburg (loan)	33	(2)
2009–2014	Energie Cottbus	63	(1)
2013	Energie Cottbus II	5	(1)
2014–2017	Viktoria Köln	73	(2)
Total		317	(16)

International career
2005–2006	Germany U21	15	(1)

Managerial career
- 2021: Viktoria Köln (interim)
- * Club domestic league appearances and goals

Markus Brzenska (born 25 May 1984) is a German football coach and former player.

== Early life ==
Markus Brzenska's parents, Joachim and Halina, and his older brothers, Sebastian and Marcin, were originally from the Upper Silesian town of Bytom (German Beuthen). They immigrated to Germany as ethnic Germans (Aussiedler), settling in Lünen near Dortmund, where Markus was born a few weeks after their arrival.

== Club career ==
=== Borussia Dortmund ===
Without any top level match experience, he was included in the starting line-up by coach Matthias Sammer in Borussia Dortmund's match against Bayern Munich on 9 November 2003. His debut ended in a send-off during the first half.

In 2004, when coach Bert van Marwijk arrived, such like some other players with whom the coach was less familiar, Brzenska's ability was overlooked. Eventually, his effort turned things around. He returned to the first team squad during the first half of the 2004–05 season and established his place in the starting line-up since then.

=== Energie Cottbus ===
During the 2008–09 season, he was loaned to 2. Bundesliga club MSV Duisburg. At the end of the loan, Duisburg were unable to pay the transfer fee that Dortmund were asking for, so he returned to Borussia Dortmund who then sold him to Energie Cottbus.

== International career ==
His family comes from Poland so he is eligible to play for Poland. In October 2010 he declared his intention to play for the Poland national team. He played 15 games for the Germany U21 national team.
