= Jannis Pellowski =

German footballer

Personal information
- Full name: Jannis Pellowski
- Date of birth: 15 June 1992 (age 34)
- Place of birth: Darmstadt, Germany
- Height: 1.83 m (6 ft 0 in)
- Position: Goalkeeper

Team information
- Current team: FSV Frankfurt
- Number: 1

Youth career
- SV Weiterstadt
- –2006: Darmstadt 98
- 2006–2011: FSV Frankfurt

Senior career*
Years	Team	Apps	(Gls)
2011–2012	FSV Frankfurt II	29	(0)
2012–	FSV Frankfurt	4	(0)
- * Club domestic league appearances and goals as of 24 July 2017 (UTC)

Jannis Pellowski (born 15 June 1992) is a German footballer who plays as a goalkeeper for FSV Frankfurt.

He made his professional debut for FSV Frankfurt in the first round of the DFB-Pokal against Bundesliga club VfL Wolfsburg on 20 August 2016, losing 1–2.
