= Marc Heitmeier =

German footballer

Personal information
- Date of birth: 18 March 1985 (age 41)
- Place of birth: Dortmund, West Germany
- Height: 1.85 m (6 ft 1 in)
- Position: Midfielder

Youth career
- 1992–1999: SG Lütgendortmund
- 1999–2004: Borussia Dortmund

Senior career*
Years	Team	Apps	(Gls)
2004–2007	Borussia Dortmund II	69	(1)
2007–2008	SV Wilhelmshaven	32	(5)
2007–2008	Kickers Offenbach	45	(0)
2010–2014	FSV Frankfurt	87	(4)
2014–2016	Preußen Münster	57	(2)
2016–2017	FSV Frankfurt	28	(0)
Total		318	(12)
- * Club domestic league appearances and goals

Marc Heitmeier (born 18 March 1985) is a German retired professional footballer who played as a midfielder.
