= 2003–04 VfL Wolfsburg season =

VfL Wolfsburg
2003–04 season
- Manager: Jürgen Röber
- Bundesliga: 10th
- DFB-Pokal: Second round
- Top goalscorer: Diego Klimowicz (15)
Home colours	Away colours

VfL Wolfsburg started the season in brilliant fashion, taking an early Bundesliga lead, before slipping back in a nightmare run, which saw the team finish in the midfield, with a lower points haul than the previous seasons. Wolfsburg also dropped a bombshell when they signed Argentine starlet Andrés D'Alessandro of River Plate. D'Alessandro had been relatively disappointing season, but Fernando Baiano together with Diego Klimowicz made sure the attack functioned really well.

== Players ==
=== First-team squad ===
Squad at end of season

Note: Flags indicate national team as defined under FIFA eligibility rules; some limited exceptions apply. Players may hold more than one non-FIFA nationality.

No.	Pos.	Nation	Player
2	DF	ARG	Pablo Quatrocchi
3	DF	CHI	Waldo Ponce (on loan from Universidad de Chile)
5	DF	GER	Stefan Schnoor
6	MF	GUI	Pablo Thiam
7	MF	GER	Patrick Weiser
9	FW	ARG	Diego Klimowicz
10	MF	ARG	Andrés D'Alessandro
12	GK	BIH	Sead Ramović
13	DF	CRO	Marino Biliškov
14	FW	BIH	Marko Topić
17	FW	BRA	Fernando Baiano
19	DF	DEN	Thomas Rytter
20	MF	BIH	Mirko Hrgović
21	MF	BUL	Martin Petrov
22	FW	GER	Roy Präger

No.	Pos.	Nation	Player
23	DF	SCG	Nenad Lalatović (on loan from Shakhtar Donetsk)
27	MF	SVK	Miroslav Karhan
29	GK	GER	Simon Jentzsch
30	MF	MKD	Nderim Nexhipi
31	DF	GHA	Hans Sarpei
32	FW	POL	Michał Janicki
33	DF	GER	Maik Franz
36	FW	ARG	Juan Carlos Menseguez
37	MF	GER	Karsten Fischer
38	DF	GER	Stefan Lorenz
39	FW	GER	Christian Ritter
40	GK	GER	Patrick Platins
41	MF	COD	Cédric Makiadi
44	GK	GER	Fabian Lucas

=== Left club during season ===
Note: Flags indicate national team as defined under FIFA eligibility rules; some limited exceptions apply. Players may hold more than one non-FIFA nationality.

No.	Pos.	Nation	Player
1	GK	GER	Claus Reitmaier (to Borussia Mönchengladbach)
4	DF	DEN	Kim Madsen (to Hansa Rostock)
8	MF	ROU	Dorinel Munteanu (to Steaua Bucharest)
11	FW	CRO	Tomislav Marić (on loan to Borussia Mönchengladbach)

No.	Pos.	Nation	Player
18	MF	GER	Albert Streit (to Köln)
23	MF	GER	Sven Müller (to Nürnberg)
24	MF	GHA	Charles Akonnor (to SpVgg Unterhaching)

=== VfL Wolfsburg II ===
Note: Flags indicate national team as defined under FIFA eligibility rules; some limited exceptions apply. Players may hold more than one non-FIFA nationality.

No.	Pos.	Nation	Player
—	MF	GER	Benjamin Siegert

== Results ==
=== Bundesliga ===
1	VfL Wolfsburg	3–2	VfL Bochum
	Thiam 9'; Klimowicz 14'; Petrov 75'		Madsen 37'; Fahrenhorst 44'

2	Borussia Dortmund	4–0	VfL Wolfsburg
	Rosický 25', 51'; M. Amoroso 74'; Koller 87'

3	VfL Wolfsburg	5–1	Hamburg
	Klimowicz 50', 86'; Petrov 60'; Müller 70'; D'Alessandro 75'		Barbarez 47'

4	1860 München	1–0	VfL Wolfsburg
	Schwarz 59'

5	VfL Wolfsburg	3–2	Bayern Munich
	Baiano 11', 83'; Klimowicz 89'		Schweinsteiger 49'; Makaay 59'

6	1. FC Köln	2–3	VfL Wolfsburg
	Scherz 35'; Voronin 60'		Biliškov 3'; Petrov 26'; Klimowicz 72'

7	VfL Wolfsburg	0–1	Bayer Leverkusen
			Schneider 57'

8	Werder Bremen	5–3	VfL Wolfsburg
	Aílton 2', 21'; Stalteri 41'; Micoud 57'; Klasnić 58'		Biliškov 40'; Streit 54'; Karhan 65'

9	VfL Wolfsburg	3–1	Hansa Rostock
	Klimowicz 31'; Baiano 39', 67'		Rydlewicz 41'

10	VfB Stuttgart	1–0	VfL Wolfsburg
	Amanatidis 41'

11	VfL Wolfsburg	3–0	Hertha Berlin
	D'Alessandro 24'; Klimowicz 47', 71'

12	Freiburg	3–2	VfL Wolfsburg
	Iashvili 31', 33', 76'		Topić 62'; Franz 90'

13	VfL Wolfsburg	1–3	Mönchengladbach
	Schnoor 33'		Van Hout 13' van Lent 68'; Kolkka 77'

14	Eintracht Frankfurt	3–2	VfL Wolfsburg
	Preuß 32'; Skela 56' (pen.); Beierle 73'		Karhan 13'; Klimowicz 25'

15	VfL Wolfsburg	4–1	1. FC Kaiserslautern
	Baiano 23', 53', 55'; Schnoor 90' (pen.)		Knavs 13'

16	VfL Wolfsburg	2–1	Hannover 96
	Baiano 29'; Petrov 68'		Stendel 14'

17	Schalke 04	1–1	VfL Wolfsburg
	Hamit Altıntop 26'		Petrov 40'

18	VfL Bochum	1–0	VfL Wolfsburg
	Fahrenhorst 35'

19	VfL Wolfsburg	2–4	Borussia Dortmund
	Petrov 36' (pen.); Baiano 88'		Jensen 42'; Koller 45'; Frings 54'; Ricken 78'

20	Hamburg	2–0	VfL Wolfsburg
	Barbarez 18'; Rahn 88'

21	VfL Wolfsburg	3–1	1860 München
	Biliškov 9'; D'Alessandro 19'; Klimowicz 62'		Weissenberger 21'

22	Bayern Munich	2–0	VfL Wolfsburg
	Makaay 11'; Schweinsteiger 76'

23	VfL Wolfsburg	2–0	1. FC Köln
	Klimowicz 30'; Topić 84'

24	Bayer Leverkusen	4–2	VfL Wolfsburg
	Berbatov 1'; Babić 13'; Schneider 32'; França 63'		Topić 21'; Klimowicz 82'

25	VfL Wolfsburg	0–2	Werder Bremen
			Klasnić 75'; Micoud 85'

26	Hansa Rostock	3–1	VfL Wolfsburg
	Arvidsson 9'; Max 33'; Möhrle 37'		Quatrocchi 26'

27	VfL Wolfsburg	1–5	VfB Stuttgart
	Petrov 30'		Gerber 6'; Streller 26'; Lahm 45'; Kurányi 73'; Szabics 86'

28	Hertha Berlin	1–0	VfL Wolfsburg
	Rafael 22'

29	VfL Wolfsburg	4–0	Freiburg
	Franz 10'; Baiano 20'; Sarpei 47'; Klimowicz 68'

30	Mönchengladbach	0–2	VfL Wolfsburg
			Baiano 44'; Karhan 65'

31	VfL Wolfsburg	1–0	Eintracht Frankfurt
	Klimowicz 10'

32	1. FC Kaiserslautern	3–2	VfL Wolfsburg
	Lokvenc 57', 72'; Bjelica 75'		Klimowicz 65'; Petrov 66'

33	Hannover 96	0–0	VfL Wolfsburg

34	VfL Wolfsburg	1–1	Schalke 04
	Karhan 2'		Franz 20' (o.g.)

=== Top Scorers ===
- (Argentina) Diego Klimowicz 15
- (Brazil) Fernando Baiano 12
- (Bulgaria) Martin Petrov 8 (1)
- (Slovakia) Miroslav Karhan 5
- (Croatia) Marino Biliškov 3
- (Argentina) Andrés D'Alessandro 3
- (Bosnia and Herzegovina) Marko Topić 3
