= 2001–02 VfL Wolfsburg season =

VfL Wolfsburg
2001–02 season
- Manager: Wolfgang Wolf
- Bundesliga: 10th
- DFB-Pokal: Last 16
- Top goalscorer: Tomislav Marić (12)
Home colours	Away colours

The 2001–02 VfL Wolfsburg season was the 57th season in the club's football history. In 2001-02 the club played in the Bundesliga, the top tier of German football. It was the club's 5th consecutive season in this league, having been promoted from the 2. Bundesliga in 1997.

== Players ==
=== First-team squad ===
Squad at end of season

Note: Flags indicate national team as defined under FIFA eligibility rules; some limited exceptions apply. Players may hold more than one non-FIFA nationality.

No.	Pos.	Nation	Player
1	GK	GER	Claus Reitmaier
2	MF	DEN	Michael Madsen
3	DF	GER	Frank Greiner
4	DF	YUG	Dušan Petković
5	DF	NGR	Emeka Ifejiagwa
6	MF	DEN	Claus Thomsen
7	MF	GER	Patrick Weiser
8	FW	ARG	Diego Klimowicz
9	FW	POL	Andrzej Juskowiak
10	MF	POL	Krzysztof Nowak
11	FW	CRO	Tomislav Marić
12	DF	POL	Waldemar Kryger
13	DF	CRO	Marino Biliškov
14	MF	ROU	Dorinel Munteanu
15	MF	GER	Tobias Rau
16	DF	AUT	Gernot Plassnegger
17	FW	GER	Jürgen Rische

No.	Pos.	Nation	Player
18	MF	AUT	Dietmar Kühbauer
19	DF	DEN	Thomas Rytter
21	FW	BUL	Martin Petrov
22	GK	BIH	Sead Ramović
23	MF	GER	Sven Müller
24	MF	GHA	Charles Akonnor
25	DF	GER	Stefan Schnoor
26	MF	BRA	Robson Ponte (on loan from Bayer Leverkusen)
27	MF	CZE	Miroslav Karhan
28	MF	GER	Benjamin Siegert
30	GK	GER	Stephan Loboué
31	MF	GHA	Hans Sarpei
32	FW	AUS	Joshua Kennedy
33	DF	GER	Maik Franz
36	MF	GER	Michael Habryka
37	DF	GER	Stefan Lorenz
40	GK	GER	Patrick Platins

=== Left club during season ===
Note: Flags indicate national team as defined under FIFA eligibility rules; some limited exceptions apply. Players may hold more than one non-FIFA nationality.

No.	Pos.	Nation	Player
20	FW	GER	Markus Feldhoff (to Energie Cottbus)

== Results ==
=== Bundesliga ===
1	Bayer Leverkusen	2–1	VfL Wolfsburg
	Lúcio 42', 46'		Feldhoff 86'

2	VfL Wolfsburg	1–1	FC St. Pauli
	Karhan 84'		Rahn 7'

3	Borussia Dortmund	4–0	VfL Wolfsburg
	M. Amoroso 28'; Ricken 33'; Koller 41'; Rosický 84'

4	VfL Wolfsburg	1–1	Freiburg
	Munteanu 67'		Sellimi 35'

5	Energie Cottbus	3–3	VfL Wolfsburg
	Kałużny 2'; Vragel 45', 49'		Juskowiak 31'; Petković 43'; Kennedy 77'

6	VfL Wolfsburg	0–2	VfB Stuttgart
			Seitz 7'; Balakov 65' (pen.)

7	1860 München	2–1	VfL Wolfsburg
	Borimirov 5'; Max 76'		Akonnor 66'

8	VfL Wolfsburg	2–0	1. FC Kaiserslautern
	Juskowiak 14'; Greiner 82'

9	1. FC Köln	0–4	VfL Wolfsburg
			Petrov 2', 50' (pen.); Ponte 6'; Karhan 61'

10	VfL Wolfsburg	0–1	Hamburg
			Hoogma 57'

11	Werder Bremen	1–0	VfL Wolfsburg
	Bode 79'

12	VfL Wolfsburg	5–0	1. FC Nürnberg
	Ponte 6', 30'; Petrov 68'; Kennedy 86'; Munteanu 87'

13	Hertha Berlin	2–0	VfL Wolfsburg
	Sarpei 21' (o.g.); Goor 81'

14	VfL Wolfsburg	3–1	Mönchengladbach
	Marić 6'; Petrov 22'; Ponte 57'		Van Houdt 64'

15	Hansa Rostock	1–2	VfL Wolfsburg
	Beierle 89'		Marić 32', 65'

16	Bayern Munich	3–3	VfL Wolfsburg
	Pizarro 11', 55'; Élber 18'		Marić 45', 71'; Kühbauer 52'

17	VfL Wolfsburg	3–1	Schalke 04
	Němec 51' (o.g.); Marić 62', 74' (pen.)		Wilmots 66'

18	VfL Wolfsburg	3–1	Bayer Leverkusen
	Ponte 39'; Marić 57', 77'		Neuville 86'

19	FC St. Pauli	3–1	VfL Wolfsburg
	Meggle 51'; Rath 75'; Bajramović 83'		Kientz 10' (o.g.)

20	VfL Wolfsburg	1–1	Borussia Dortmund
	Marić 36' (pen.)		Heinrich 3'

21	Freiburg	0–0	VfL Wolfsburg

22	VfL Wolfsburg	2–1	Energie Cottbus
	Ponte 12', 24'		Vragel 90'

23	VfB Stuttgart	2–1	VfL Wolfsburg
	Meißner 9'; Hleb 77'		Klimowicz 87'

24	VfL Wolfsburg	1–3	1860 München
	Biliškov 54'		Týce 56'; Max 59'; Weissenberger 90'

25	1. FC Kaiserslautern	3–2	VfL Wolfsburg
	Hristov 64'; Klose 74'; Lokvenc 84'		Hristov 49' (o.g.); Munteanu 72'

26	VfL Wolfsburg	5–1	1. FC Köln
	Klimowicz 4', 18'; Rau 8'; Petrov 62'; Karhan 77'		Kreuz 45'

27	Hamburg	1–1	VfL Wolfsburg
	Barbarez 67'		Klimowicz 45'

28	VfL Wolfsburg	2–0	Werder Bremen
	Klimowicz 64'; Petrov 78'

29	1. FC Nürnberg	3–0	VfL Wolfsburg
	Rink 15' (pen.); Krzynówek 74' (pen.); Gomis 86'

30	VfL Wolfsburg	1–3	Hertha Berlin
	Klimowicz 36'		Hartmann 25'; Preetz 28'; Marx 48'

31	Mönchengladbach	0–2	VfL Wolfsburg
			Klimowicz 48', 60'

32	VfL Wolfsburg	4–0	Hansa Rostock
	Klimowicz 4', 5'; Ponte 7'; Juskowiak 37'

33	VfL Wolfsburg	0–1	Bayern Munich
			Sagnol 33'

34	Schalke 04	1–2	VfL Wolfsburg
	Asamoah 90'		Marić 29', 87'

=== Top Scorers ===
- (Croatia) Tomislav Marić 12
- (Argentina) Diego Klimowicz 10
- (Brazil) Robson Ponte 8
- (Bulgaria) Martin Petrov 6
