= 2002–03 VfL Wolfsburg season =

VfL Wolfsburg
2002–03 season
- Manager: Wolfgang Wolf
- Bundesliga: 8th
- DFB-Pokal: Second round
- Top goalscorer: Tomislav Marić (12)
| Home colours | Away colours |

VfL Wolfsburg finished 8th in Bundesliga, qualifying for the UEFA Intertoto Cup. The club got into the spotlight signing Bayern Munich star Stefan Effenberg, who finished his career with a season in the Volkswagen-owned club. Elsewhere, Martin Petrov and Tomislav Marić had successful seasons, being pivotal in the European qualification.

== Players ==
=== First-team squad ===
Squad at end of season

| No. | Pos. | Nation | Player |
|---|---|---|---|
| 1 | GK | GER | Claus Reitmaier |
| 2 | MF | GUI | Pablo Thiam |
| 3 | DF | GER | Frank Greiner |
| 4 | DF | DEN | Kim Madsen |
| 5 | DF | GER | Stefan Schnoor |
| 6 | MF | GHA | Charles Akonnor |
| 7 | MF | GER | Patrick Weiser |
| 8 | MF | ROU | Dorinel Munteanu |
| 9 | FW | ARG | Diego Klimowicz |
| 10 | MF | GER | Stefan Effenberg |
| 11 | FW | CRO | Tomislav Marić |
| 12 | GK | BIH | Sead Ramović |
| 13 | DF | CRO | Marino Biliškov |
| 14 | FW | DEN | Peter Madsen (on loan from Brøndby) |
| 15 | MF | GER | Tobias Rau |

| No. | Pos. | Nation | Player |
|---|---|---|---|
| 19 | DF | DEN | Thomas Rytter |
| 20 | DF | ARG | Pablo Quatrocchi |
| 21 | FW | BUL | Martin Petrov |
| 22 | FW | GER | Roy Präger |
| 23 | MF | GER | Sven Müller |
| 26 | MF | BRA | Robson Ponte (on loan from Bayer Leverkusen) |
| 27 | MF | CZE | Miroslav Karhan |
| 30 | GK | DEN | Jesper Christiansen (on loan from Rangers) |
| 31 | MF | GHA | Hans Sarpei |
| 32 | FW | POL | Michał Janicki |
| 33 | DF | GER | Maik Franz |
| 35 | MF | POL | Bartosz Romanczuk |
| 36 | MF | GER | Michael Habryka |
| 37 | DF | GER | Stefan Lorenz |
| 40 | GK | GER | Patrick Platins |

=== Left club during season ===
Note: Flags indicate national team as defined under FIFA eligibility rules; some limited exceptions apply. Players may hold more than one non-FIFA nationality.

| No. | Pos. | Nation | Player |
|---|---|---|---|
| 2 | MF | DEN | Michael Madsen (to Farum) |
| 10 | MF | GER | Stefan Effenberg (released) |
| 16 | DF | AUT | Gernot Plassnegger (on loan to Waldhof Mannheim) |

| No. | Pos. | Nation | Player |
|---|---|---|---|
| 20 | DF | NGA | Emeka Ifejiagwa (on loan to Waldhof Mannheim) |
| — | DF | SCG | Dušan Petković (to 1. FC Nürnberg) |
| — | FW | AUS | Joshua Kennedy (to Stuttgarter Kickers) |

== Results ==
=== Bundesliga ===
| 1 | Schalke 04 | 1–0 | VfL Wolfsburg |
| | Vermant 88' |

| 2 | VfL Wolfsburg | 1–0 | Mönchengladbach |
| | Petrov 67' |

| 3 | Arminia Bielefeld | 1–0 | VfL Wolfsburg |
| | Brinkmann 44' |

| 4 | VfL Wolfsburg | 2–1 | Hamburg |
| | Effenberg 51' (pen.); Sarpei 83' | | Antar 73' |

| 5 | 1860 München | 2–2 | VfL Wolfsburg |
| | Wiesinger 48'; Schroth 64' | | Ponte 77'; Klimowicz 87' |

| 6 | VfL Wolfsburg | 0–2 | 1. FC Nürnberg |
| | | | Sanneh 67'; Petković 69' |

| 7 | Energie Cottbus | 0–1 | VfL Wolfsburg |
| | | | Marić 55' |

| 8 | VfL Wolfsburg | 2–0 | Bayer Leverkusen |
| | Marić 6'; Effenberg 64' |

| 9 | VfL Bochum | 4–2 | VfL Wolfsburg |
| | Christiansen 4'; Fahrenhorst 56'; Freier 57'; Hashemian 82' | | Klimowicz 6'; Ponte 37' |

| 10 | VfL Wolfsburg | 1–0 | Hansa Rostock |
| | Klimowicz 29' |

| 11 | Hannover 96 | 3–1 | VfL Wolfsburg |
| | Stendel 23'; Bobič 28'; Konstantinidis 82' | | Munteanu 76' |

| 12 | VfL Wolfsburg | 3–1 | Werder Bremen |
| | Petrov 28'; Ponte 67'; Effenberg 84' | | Micoud 70' |

| 13 | Bayern Munich | 1–0 | VfL Wolfsburg |
| | Santa Cruz 27' |

| 14 | VfL Wolfsburg | 2–0 | Borussia Dortmund |
| | Klimowicz 19', 55' |

| 15 | 1. FC Kaiserslautern | 2–0 | VfL Wolfsburg |
| | Lokvenc 15'; Lincoln 66' |

| 16 | Hertha Berlin | 2–2 | VfL Wolfsburg |
| | Šimunić 25'; Goor 47' | | Ponte 62'; Madsen 90' |

| 17 | VfL Wolfsburg | 1–2 | VfB Stuttgart |
| | Marić 76' (pen.) | | T. Schneider 35'; Meira 55' |

| 18 | VfL Wolfsburg | 1–2 | Schalke 04 |
| | Marić 71' | | Kmetsch 47'; Varela 51' |

| 19 | VfL Wolfsburg | 2–0 | Arminia Bielefeld |
| | Schnoor 25'; Marić 51' |

| 20 | Hamburg | 2–0 | VfL Wolfsburg |
| | Cardoso 38'; Benjamin 90' |

| 21 | Mönchengladbach | 2–0 | VfL Wolfsburg |
| | Schnoor 33' (o.g.); Aidoo 71' |

| 22 | VfL Wolfsburg | 1–1 | 1860 München |
| | Klimowicz 70' | | Lauth 51' |

| 23 | 1. FC Nürnberg | 1–1 | VfL Wolfsburg |
| | Müller 25' (pen.) | | Marić 90' |

| 24 | VfL Wolfsburg | 3–2 | Energie Cottbus |
| | Marić 9'; Präger 29'; Ponte 62' | | Rink 7'; Reghecampf 16' (pen.) |

| 25 | Bayer Leverkusen | 1–1 | VfL Wolfsburg |
| | Ramelow 68' | | Marić 81' |

| 26 | VfL Wolfsburg | 2–0 | VfL Bochum |
| | Marić 21'; Präger 31' |

| 27 | Hansa Rostock | 1–0 | VfL Wolfsburg |
| | Hill 3' |

| 28 | VfL Wolfsburg | 1–0 | Hannover 96 |
| | Klimowicz 56' |

| 29 | Werder Bremen | 0–1 | VfL Wolfsburg |
| | | | Biliškov 85' |

| 30 | VfL Wolfsburg | 0–2 | Bayern Munich |
| | | | Élber 60'; Pizarro 83' |

| 31 | Borussia Dortmund | 2–2 | VfL Wolfsburg |
| | Ricken 16'; Rosický 67' | | Thiam 59', 62' |

| 32 | VfL Wolfsburg | 2–2 | 1. FC Kaiserslautern |
| | Marić 20', 57' | | Sforza 5'; Mifsud 70' |

| 33 | VfL Wolfsburg | 2–0 | Hertha Berlin |
| | Marić 5' (pen.); Munteanu 58' |

| 34 | VfB Stuttgart | 2–0 | VfL Wolfsburg |
| | Kurányi 12'; Balakov 24' (pen.) |
