= 2004–05 VfL Wolfsburg season =

VfL Wolfsburg
2004–05 season
- Manager: Eric Gerets
- Bundesliga: 9th
- DFB-Pokal: First round
- Top goalscorer: Thomas Brdarić (12)
Home colours	Away colours	Third colours

VfL Wolfsburg dropped off the pace for the second season running. A successful start to the season saw Wolfsburg running first in the league, looking like strong contenders, but as the season processed, the form dropped, and at the end of the season the team had lost one more match than they had won, surprisingly dropping off the top half of the table. Manager Eric Gerets left after one season in charge, and was replaced by former Borussia Mönchengladbach manager Holger Fach.

== Players ==
=== First-team squad ===
Squad at end of season

Note: Flags indicate national team as defined under FIFA eligibility rules; some limited exceptions apply. Players may hold more than one non-FIFA nationality.

No.	Pos.	Nation	Player
1	GK	GER	Simon Jentzsch
2	DF	DEN	Thomas Rytter
3	DF	CRO	Marino Biliškov
5	DF	GER	Stefan Schnoor
6	MF	GUI	Pablo Thiam
7	MF	GER	Patrick Weiser
8	MF	BUL	Marian Hristov
9	FW	ARG	Diego Klimowicz
10	MF	ARG	Andrés D'Alessandro
11	FW	CRO	Tomislav Marić
13	FW	GER	Thomas Brdarić
14	FW	BIH	Marko Topić
18	DF	ARG	Facundo Quiroga
20	MF	BIH	Mirko Hrgović

No.	Pos.	Nation	Player
21	MF	BUL	Martin Petrov
26	MF	GER	Karsten Fischer
27	MF	SVK	Miroslav Karhan
29	DF	NED	Kevin Hofland
30	GK	GER	André Lenz
31	DF	GHA	Hans Sarpei
33	DF	GER	Maik Franz
34	FW	GER	Roy Präger
36	FW	ARG	Juan Carlos Menseguez
38	DF	GER	Stefan Lorenz
39	FW	GER	Christian Ritter
40	GK	GER	Patrick Platins
41	MF	COD	Cédric Makiadi

=== Left club during season ===
Note: Flags indicate national team as defined under FIFA eligibility rules; some limited exceptions apply. Players may hold more than one non-FIFA nationality.

No.	Pos.	Nation	Player
16	MF	ARG	Oscar Ahumada (on loan from River Plate)

=== VfL Wolfsburg II ===
Note: Flags indicate national team as defined under FIFA eligibility rules; some limited exceptions apply. Players may hold more than one non-FIFA nationality.

No.	Pos.	Nation	Player
—	DF	POL	Bartosz Romańczuk

== Results ==
=== Bundesliga ===
1	Borussia Dortmund	1–2	VfL Wolfsburg
	Ewerthon 32'		Brdarić 43', 64'

2	VfL Wolfsburg	0–1	SC Freiburg
			Dorn 85'

3	Werder Bremen	1–2	VfL Wolfsburg
	Klose 70'		Brdarić 46'; Thiam 53'

4	VfL Wolfsburg	3–0	Schalke 04
	Hristov 30', 40'; Klimowicz 90'

5	Hansa Rostock	1–2	VfL Wolfsburg
	Madsen 33'		Klimowicz 17'; Thiam 78'

6	VfL Wolfsburg	2–1	1. FC Kaiserslautern
	Petrov 13'; Klimowicz 90'		Jancker 82'

7	VfL Wolfsburg	2–1	Borussia Mönchengladbach
	D'Alessandro 13'; Schnoor 42'		Neuville 16'

8	Hannover 96	3–0	VfL Wolfsburg
	Schroter 7', 64'; Stendel 90'

9	VfL Wolfsburg	3–0	VfL Bochum
	Thiam 27'; Klimowicz 40'; D'Alessandro 42'

10	Bayern Munich	2–0	VfL Wolfsburg
	Pizarro 24', 45'

11	VfL Wolfsburg	4–3	Mainz 05
	Petrov 45', 45+', 57' (pen.), 75'		Abel 15'; Casey 17'; Babatz 75'

12	1. FC Nürnberg	4–0	VfL Wolfsburg
	Mintál 2', 28', 49'; Schroth 45'

13	VfL Wolfsburg	3–0	VfB Stuttgart
	Brdarić 42'; Petrov 69', 76'

14	Hamburger SV	3–1	VfL Wolfsburg
	Van Buyten 40'; Barbarez 45'; Romeo 90'		Brdarić 1'

15	VfL Wolfsburg	2–3	Hertha BSC
	Thiam 50'; Brdarić 68'		Marcelinho 16', 47', 74'

16	Bayer Leverkusen	2–1	VfL Wolfsburg
	Voronin 46'; França 89'		Klimowicz 4'

17	VfL Wolfsburg	5–0	Arminia Bielefeld
	Rytter 14'; Klimowicz 26'; Brdarić 37', 40'; Petrov 67' (pen.)

18	VfL Wolfsburg	1–2	Borussia Dortmund
	Quiroga 82'		Smolarek 56'; Koller 60'

19	SC Freiburg	1–0	VfL Wolfsburg
	Bajramović 57'

20	VfL Wolfsburg	2–3	Werder Bremen
	Brdarić 26'; Thiam 50'		Klose 51'; Magnin 59'; Valdez 87'

21	Schalke 04	3–0	VfL Wolfsburg
	Asamoah 13'; Sand 35'; Hanke 85'

22	VfL Wolfsburg	4–0	Hansa Rostock
	D'Alessandro 4'; Klimowicz 7'; Thiam 63'; Marić 83'

23	1. FC Kaiserslautern	0–0	VfL Wolfsburg

24	Borussia Mönchengladbach	1–0	VfL Wolfsburg
	Svěrkoš 87'

25	VfL Wolfsburg	1–0	Hannover 96
	Menseguez 6'

26	VfL Bochum	5–1	VfL Wolfsburg
	Edu 15', 38'; Wosz 24'; Lokvenc 40'; Madsen 57'		Petrov 73'

27	VfL Wolfsburg	0–3	Bayern Munich
			Schweinsteiger 29'; Hofland 42' (o.g.); Frings 55'

28	Mainz 05	0–2	VfL Wolfsburg
			Brdarić 64'; Schnoor 78'

29	VfL Wolfsburg	0–1	1. FC Nürnberg
			Kießling 63'

30	VfB Stuttgart	0–0	VfL Wolfsburg

31	VfL Wolfsburg	1–0	Hamburger SV
	Petrov 41'

32	Hertha BSC	3–1	VfL Wolfsburg
	Friedrich 63'; Marcelinho 81'; Madlung 88'		Petrov 17'

33	VfL Wolfsburg	2–2	Bayer Leverkusen
	Karhan 24'; Brdarić 30'		França 61'; Bierofka 86'

34	Arminia Bielefeld	1–2	VfL Wolfsburg
	Vata 35'		Petrov 41' (pen.); Brdarić 56'

=== Top Scorers ===
- (Germany) Thomas Brdarić – 12
- (Bulgaria) Martin Petrov – 12
- (Argentina) Diego Klimowicz – 7
- (Guinea) Pablo Thiam – 6
- (Argentina) Andrés D'Alessandro – 3
