= 2000–01 VfL Wolfsburg season =

VfL Wolfsburg
2000–01 season
- Head coach: Wolfgang Wolf
- Stadium: VfL-Stadion am Elsterweg
- Bundesliga: 9th
- DFB-Pokal: Round of 16
- UEFA Intertoto Cup: Semi-finals
- Top goalscorer: League: Andrzej Juskowiak (12); All: Andrzej Juskowiak (12)
- Average home league attendance: 15,501
- Biggest win: 6–0 against 1. FC Köln
- Biggest defeat: 4–1 against SC Freiburg

The 2000–01 season was the 56th season in the history of VfL Wolfsburg and their fourth consecutive season in the top flight. The club participated in the Bundesliga, the DFB-Pokal and the UEFA Intertoto Cup.

== Competitions ==
=== Overall record ===
Competition	First match	Last match	Starting round	Final position	Record							
Competition	First match	Last match	Starting round	Final position	Pld	W	D	L	GF	GA	GD	Win %
Bundesliga	12 August 2000	19 May 2001	Matchday 1	9th	34	12	11	11	60	45	+15	35.29
DFB-Pokal	26 August 2000	28 November 2000	Third round	Round of 16	3	2	1	0	5	2	+3	66.67
UEFA Intertoto Cup	15 July 2000	2 August 2000	Third round	Semi-finals	4	1	2	1	4	4	+0	25.00
Total					41	15	14	12	69	51	+18	36.59

Source: Competitions

=== Bundesliga ===
==== League table ====
Pos	Team	Pld	W	D	L	GF	GA	GD	Pts	Qualification or relegation
7	Werder Bremen	34	15	8	11	53	48	+5	53	Qualification to Intertoto Cup third round
8	1. FC Kaiserslautern	34	15	5	14	49	54	−5	50	
9	VfL Wolfsburg	34	12	11	11	60	45	+15	47	Qualification to Intertoto Cup third round
10	1. FC Köln	34	12	10	12	59	52	+7	46	
11	1860 Munich	34	12	8	14	43	55	−12	44	Qualification to Intertoto Cup second round

Source: www.dfb.de
Rules for classification: 1) points; 2) goal difference; 3) number of goals scored.

==== Results summary ====
Overall								Home						Away					
Pld	W	D	L	GF	GA	GD	Pts	W	D	L	GF	GA	GD	W	D	L	GF	GA	GD
34	12	11	11	60	45	+15	47	8	6	3	38	18	+20	4	5	8	22	27	−5

Source: DFB

==== Results by round ====
Round	1	2	3	4	5	6	7	8	9	10	11	12	13	14	15	16	17	18	19	20	21	22	23	24	25	26	27	28	29	30	31	32	33	34
Ground	A	H	A	H	A	H	H	A	H	A	H	A	H	A	H	A	H	H	A	H	A	H	A	A	H	A	H	A	H	A	H	A	H	A
Result	L	W	L	W	L	D	D	W	W	D	D	D	D	L	W	W	L	W	D	L	W	D	L	L	W	D	W	D	L	W	D	L	W	L
Position	15	7	12	10	11	10	12	8	7	7	7	8	8	9	8	6	8	7	8	9	7	8	9	11	9	9	9	9	10	9	10	10	9	9

Source: DFB
A = Away; H = Home; W = Win; D = Draw; L = Loss

==== Matches ====
12 August 2000 1	Bayer Leverkusen	2–0	VfL Wolfsburg	Leverkusen
15:30 CEST (UTC+2)				Stadium: BayArena

19 August 2000 2	VfL Wolfsburg	4–0	1. FC Kaiserslautern	Wolfsburg
15:30 CEST (UTC+2)				Stadium: Volkswagen Arena

6 September 2000 3	FC Bayern Munich	3–1	VfL Wolfsburg	Munich
20:15 CEST (UTC+2)				Stadium: Olympiastadion

9 September 2000 4	VfL Wolfsburg	2–1	Hertha BSC	Wolfsburg
15:30 CEST (UTC+2)				Stadium: Volkswagen Arena

16 September 2000 5	VfL Bochum	2–1	VfL Wolfsburg	Bochum
15:30 CEST (UTC+2)				Stadium: Ruhrstadion

23 September 2000 6	VfL Wolfsburg	4–4	Hamburger SV	Wolfsburg
15:30 CEST (UTC+2)				Stadium: Volkswagen Arena

1 October 2000 7	VfL Wolfsburg	2–2	VfB Stuttgart	Wolfsburg
17:30 CEST (UTC+2)				Stadium: Volkswagen Arena

15 October 2000 8	SpVgg Unterhaching	0–3	VfL Wolfsburg	Unterhaching
17:30 CEST (UTC+2)				Stadium: Sportpark Unterhaching

21 October 2000 9	VfL Wolfsburg	6–0	1. FC Köln	Wolfsburg
15:30 CEST (UTC+2)				Stadium: Volkswagen Arena

28 October 2000 10	Hansa Rostock	1–1	VfL Wolfsburg	Rostock
15:30 CEST (UTC+2)				Stadium: Ostseestadion

5 November 2000 11	VfL Wolfsburg	1–1	Energie Cottbus	Wolfsburg
17:30 CET (UTC+1)				Stadium: Volkswagen Arena

11 November 2000 12	1860 Munich	2–2	VfL Wolfsburg	Munich
15:30 CET (UTC+1)				Stadium: Olympiastadion

18 November 2000 13	VfL Wolfsburg	1–1	Werder Bremen	Wolfsburg
15:30 CET (UTC+1)				Stadium: Volkswagen Arena

25 November 2000 14	Borussia Dortmund	2–1	VfL Wolfsburg	Dortmund
15:30 CET (UTC+1)				Stadium: Westfalenstadion

2 December 2000 15	VfL Wolfsburg	2–0	Schalke 04	Wolfsburg
15:30 CET (UTC+1)				Stadium: Volkswagen Arena

8 December 2000 16	Eintracht Frankfurt	1–2	VfL Wolfsburg	Frankfurt
20:15 CET (UTC+1)				Stadium: Waldstadion

12 December 2000 17	VfL Wolfsburg	1–2	SC Freiburg	Wolfsburg
20:15 CET (UTC+1)				Stadium: Volkswagen Arena

16 December 2000 18	VfL Wolfsburg	2–0	Bayer Leverkusen	Wolfsburg
15:30 CET (UTC+1)				Stadium: Volkswagen Arena

27 January 2001 19	1. FC Kaiserslautern	0–0	VfL Wolfsburg	Kaiserslautern
15:30 CET (UTC+1)				Stadium: Fritz-Walter-Stadion

3 February 2001 20	VfL Wolfsburg	1–3	Bayern Munich	Wolfsburg
15:30 CET (UTC+1)				Stadium: Volkswagen Arena

10 February 2001 21	Hertha BSC	1–3	VfL Wolfsburg	Berlin
15:30 CET (UTC+1)				Stadium: Olympiastadion

17 February 2001 22	VfL Wolfsburg	0–0	VfL Bochum	Wolfsburg
15:30 CET (UTC+1)				Stadium: Volkswagen Arena

24 February 2001 23	Hamburger SV	3–2	VfL Wolfsburg	Hamburg
15:30 CET (UTC+1)				Stadium: Volksparkstadion

3 March 2001 24	VfB Stuttgart	2–1	VfL Wolfsburg	Stuttgart
15:30 CET (UTC+1)				Stadium: Gottlieb-Daimler-Stadion

10 March 2001 25	VfL Wolfsburg	6–1	SpVgg Unterhaching	Wolfsburg
15:30 CET (UTC+1)				Stadium: Volkswagen Arena

16 March 2001 26	1. FC Köln	0–0	VfL Wolfsburg	Cologne
20:15 CET (UTC+1)				Stadium: Müngersdorfer Stadion

30 March 2001 27	VfL Wolfsburg	2–1	Hansa Rostock	Wolfsburg
20:15 CEST (UTC+2)				Stadium: Volkswagen Arena

6 April 2001 28	Energie Cottbus	0–0	VfL Wolfsburg	Cottbus
20:15 CEST (UTC+2)				Stadium: Stadion der Freundschaft

14 April 2001 29	VfL Wolfsburg	0–1	1860 Munich	Wolfsburg
15:30 CEST (UTC+2)				Stadium: Volkswagen Arena

21 April 2001 30	Werder Bremen	2–3	VfL Wolfsburg	Bremen
15:30 CEST (UTC+2)				Stadium: Weserstadion

27 April 2001 31	VfL Wolfsburg	1–1	Borussia Dortmund	Wolfsburg
20:15 CEST (UTC+2)				Stadium: Volkswagen Arena

5 May 2001 32	Schalke 04	2–1	VfL Wolfsburg	Gelsenkirchen
15:30 CEST (UTC+2)				Stadium: Parkstadion

12 May 2001 33	VfL Wolfsburg	3–0	Eintracht Frankfurt	Wolfsburg
15:30 CEST (UTC+2)				Stadium: Volkswagen Arena

19 May 2001 34	SC Freiburg	4–1	VfL Wolfsburg	Freiburg
15:30 CEST (UTC+2)				Stadium: Dreisamstadion

=== DFB-Pokal ===
26 August 2000 Third round	Werder Bremen II	0–1	VfL Wolfsburg	Bremen
15:30 CEST (UTC+2)		Report		Stadium: Weserstadion, Platz 11; Attendance: 1,600; Referee: Jürgen Jansen

1 November 2000 Second round	VfL Wolfsburg	3–1	Hertha BSC	Wolfsburg
20:00 CET (UTC+1)	Akpoborie 9'; O'Neil 30'; Nowak 83'	Report	Beinlich 20'	Stadium: VfL-Stadion am Elsterweg; Attendance: 8,400; Referee: Helmut Fleischer

28 November 2000 Round of 16	VfL Wolfsburg	1–1 (a.e.t.) (3–4 p)	MSV Duisburg	Wolfsburg
19:30 CET (UTC+1)	Akonnor 120'	Report	Milovanović 116'	Stadium: VfL-Stadion am Elsterweg; Attendance: 5,000; Referee: Peter Sippel
	Penalties
	Marić (penalty scored); Rische (penalty missed); Akonnor (penalty missed); Weiser (penalty scored); Thomsen (penalty scored)		Kovačević (penalty scored); Wedau (penalty scored); Seidel (penalty missed); Drsek (penalty scored); Milovanović (penalty scored)

=== UEFA Intertoto Cup ===
==== Third round ====
15 July 2000 First leg	Sedan (France)	0–0	(Germany) VfL Wolfsburg	Sedan, France
CEST (UTC+2)				Stadium: Stade Émile Albeau; Attendance: 5,000; Referee: William Young (Scotland)

22 July 2000 Second leg	VfL Wolfsburg (Germany)	2–1	(France) Sedan	Wolfsburg
CEST (UTC+2)	Akonnor 33'; Adjaoud 79' (o.g.)		Ndiefi 56'	Stadium: VfL-Stadion am Elsterweg; Attendance: 4,500; Referee: Jon Skjervold (Norway)

==== Semi-finals ====
26 July 2000 First leg	Auxerre (France)	1–1	(Germany) VfL Wolfsburg	Auxerre, France
20:30 CEST (UTC+2)	Sebescen 71' (o.g.)		Rische 21'	Stadium: Stade de l'Abbé-Deschamps; Attendance: 1,455; Referee: Pasquale Rodomonti (Italy)

2 August 2000 Second leg	VfL Wolfsburg (Germany)	1–2 (a.e.t.) (2–3 agg.)	(France) Auxerre	Wolfsburg
20:00 CEST (UTC+2)	Marić 50'		Kłos 26'; Cissé 101'	Stadium: VfL-Stadion am Elsterweg; Attendance: 4,200; Referee: Attila Hanacsek (Hungary)
