= Michael Lorenz (footballer) =

German footballer & coach (born 1979)

Personal information
- Date of birth: 11 January 1979 (age 47)
- Place of birth: East Berlin, East Germany
- Height: 1.85 m (6 ft 1 in)
- Positions: Defender; midfielder

Team information
- Current team: Arminia Klosterhardt (sporting director)

Senior career*
Years	Team	Apps	(Gls)
1997–1998	FC Berlin	5	(0)
1998–1999	KFC Uerdingen 05	15	(0)
1999–2003	SV Babelsberg 03	115	(13)
2003–2005	SC Paderborn	47	(4)
2005–2010	Rot-Weiss Essen	101	(8)
2010–2011	KFC Uerdingen 05	7	(2)
Total		290	(27)

Managerial career
- 2012–2014: Arminia Klosterhardt
- 2014–2015: FC Kray
- 2016: SSVg Velbert
- 2017: Arminia Klosterhardt
- * Club domestic league appearances and goals

Michael Lorenz (born 11 January 1979) is a German former footballer who played as a defender or midfielder. He is currently the assistant coach of Arminia Klosterhardt.

His brother, Stefan, was also a professional footballer.

== Playing career ==
Lorenz began his career with FC Berlin, before joining KFC Uerdingen 05 in 1998, where he made 15 appearances in the 2. Bundesliga. After Uerdingen were relegated, Lorenz returned north, joining SV Babelsberg 03, where he had four successful years, earning promotion to the 2. Bundesliga in 2001, before being relegated after one season. In 2003, Lorenz moved to SC Paderborn 07, before joining Rot-Weiss Essen two years later. He returned to Uerdingen in 2010, retiring a year later.

== Coaching career ==
From 2006 to 2011, Lorenz was also a youth coach (U12-U19) at SV Vonderort beside his playing career. He retired in the summer 0211 and from 2012 to 2014, Lorenz was head coach of DJK Arminia Klosterhardt's first team. For the 2014/15 season, he became head coach of the regional league club FC Kray. He left the position in the summer 2015.

On 9 April 2016, he took over the coaching position at relegation-threatened Regionalliga club SSVg Velbert. But after only six games, Lorenz was released again. In April 2017 he took over the coaching position at the DJK Arminia Klosterhardt for the second time until the end of the season, where he also played a few game for the club's reserve team.

At the end of July 2017, he was hired as a base coordinator/coach for the German Football Association in his hometown, Berlin. His job was to coach 12–15 years-olds young boys in additional training and practice tests to get young players on the right path in cooperation with the Berlin Football Association. He left the position at the end of October 2018.

On 21 November 2018, he returned once again to DJK Arminia Klosterhardt, this time as a sporting director. As of April 2020, he was still the club's sporting director.
