= Claus Reitmaier =

German football coach and former player (born 1964)

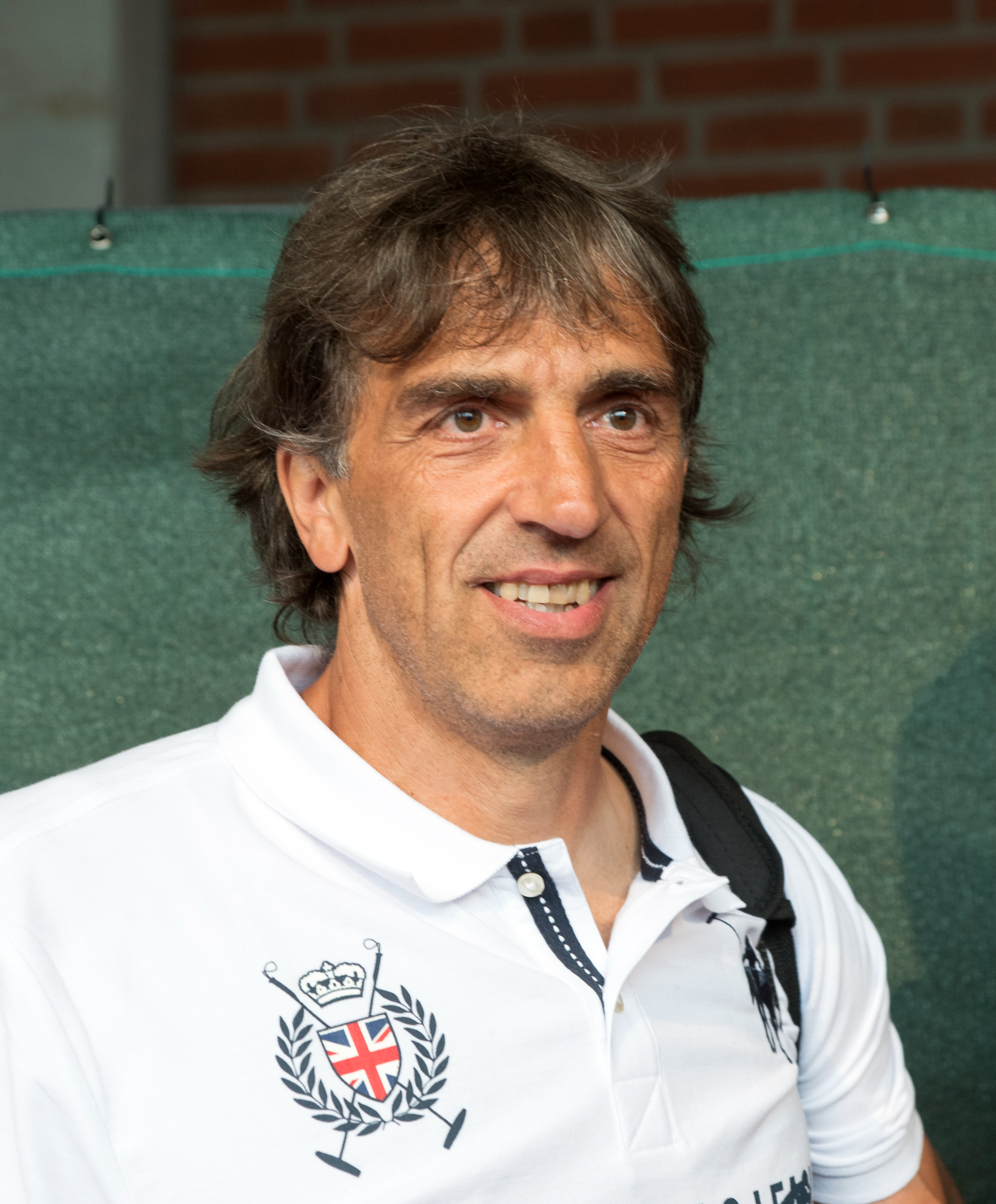
- Reitmaier in 2016

Personal information
- Date of birth: 17 March 1964 (age 62)
- Place of birth: Würzburg, West Germany
- Height: 1.87 m (6 ft 2 in)
- Position: Goalkeeper

Youth career
- Kickers Würzburg

Senior career*
Years	Team	Apps	(Gls)
1986–1989	Viktoria Aschaffenburg	85	(0)
1989–1991	Wiener Sportklub	44	(0)
1990	Blackburn Rovers	0	(0)
1991–1993	Stuttgarter Kickers	76	(0)
1993–1994	1. FC Kaiserslautern	7	(0)
1994–1998	Karlsruher SC	130	(0)
1998–2003	VfL Wolfsburg	163	(0)
2003–2004	Borussia Mönchengladbach	5	(0)
2004–2005	Rot-Weiß Erfurt	7	(0)
2005–2006	Lillestrøm SK	19	(0)
2011–2013	SV Halstenbek-Rellingen	22	(0)
Total		558	(0)

Managerial career
- 2004–2005: Rot-Weiß Erfurt (Goalkeeper coach)
- 2007–2010: Hamburger SV (Goalkeeper coach)
- 2007–2010: SV Halstenbek-Rellingen (Goalkeeper coach)
- 2013–: SC Paderborn (Goalkeeper coach)
- * Club domestic league appearances and goals

Claus Reitmaier (born 17 March 1964 in Würzburg) is a German football coach and former player.

== Career statistics ==
Appearances and goals by club, season and competition
Club	Season	League			National cup		Europe		Other		Total	
Club	Season	Division	Apps	Goals	Apps	Goals	Apps	Goals	Apps	Goals	Apps	Goals
Viktoria Aschaffenburg	1986–87	2. Bundesliga	21	0	0	0	—		—		21	0
Viktoria Aschaffenburg	1987–88	Oberliga	34	0	4	0	—		—		38	0
Viktoria Aschaffenburg	1988–89	2. Bundesliga	30	0	0	0	—		—		30	0
Viktoria Aschaffenburg	Total		85	0	4	0	—		—		89	0
Wiener Sportklub	1989–90	Austrian Bundesliga	22	0	2	0	—		—		24	0
Wiener Sportklub	1990–91	Austrian Bundesliga	22	0	4	0	—		—		26	0
Wiener Sportklub	Total		44	0	6	0	—		—		50	0
Stuttgarter Kickers	1991–92	Bundesliga	30	0	2	0	—		—		32	0
Stuttgarter Kickers	1992–93	2. Bundesliga	46	0	1	0	—		—		47	0
Stuttgarter Kickers	Total		76	0	3	0	—		—		79	0
1. FC Kaiserslautern	1993–94	Bundesliga	7	0	1	0	—		—		8	0
Karlsruher SC	1994–95	Bundesliga	33	0	4	0	—		—		37	0
Karlsruher SC	1995–96	Bundesliga	34	0	6	0	2	0	—		42	0
Karlsruher SC	1996–97	Bundesliga	34	0	5	0	8	0	—		47	0
Karlsruher SC	1997–98	Bundesliga	29	0	2	0	6	0	2	0	39	0
Karlsruher SC	Total		130	0	17	0	16	0	2	0	165	0
VfL Wolfsburg	1998–99	Bundesliga	34	0	5	0	—		—		39	0
VfL Wolfsburg	1999–2000	Bundesliga	34	0	2	0	6	0	—		42	0
VfL Wolfsburg	2000–01	Bundesliga	34	0	3	0	4	0	—		41	0
VfL Wolfsburg	2001–02	Bundesliga	32	0	3	0	4	0	—		39	0
VfL Wolfsburg	2002–03	Bundesliga	29	0	2	0	—		—		31	0
VfL Wolfsburg	Total		163	0	15	0	14	0	—		192	0
Borussia Mönchengladbach	2003–04	Bundesliga	5	0	1	0	—		—		6	0
Rot-Weiß Erfurt	2004–05	2. Bundesliga	7	0	1	0	—		—		8	0
Lillestrøm SK	2005	Tippeligaen	19	0	5	0	—		—		24	0
SV Halstenbek-Rellingen	2011–12	Oberliga	5	0	—		—		—		5	0
SV Halstenbek-Rellingen	2012–13	Oberliga	17	0	—		—		—		17	0
SV Halstenbek-Rellingen	Total		22	0	—		—		—		22	0
Career total			558	0	53	0	30	0	2	0	645	0

== Honours ==
- DFB-Pokal finalist: 1995–96
- Bundesliga runner-up: 1993–94
- Norwegian Football Cup finalist: 2005
