= Vragel da Silva =

Brazilian footballer and manager (born 1974)

Personal information
- Full name: Vragel da Silva
- Date of birth: 29 March 1974 (age 52)
- Place of birth: Campo Grande, RJ, Brazil
- Height: 1.86 m (6 ft 1 in)
- Position: Right back

Youth career
- Campo Grande

Senior career*
Years	Team	Apps	(Gls)
1994–1998	Campo Grande		
1998–2000	Brøndby	36	(6)
2000	→ Karlsruher SC (loan)	17	(2)
2000–2001	SSV Ulm	16	(0)
2001–2009	Energie Cottbus	172	(14)
Total		205	(16)

Managerial career
- 2010–2011: Energie Cottbus U17
- 2011–2013: Energie Cottbus U19 (assistant)
- 2013–2015: Energie Cottbus II
- 2015–2017: Oberlausitz Neugersdorf
- * Club domestic league appearances and goals

Vragel da Silva (born 29 March 1974) is a Brazilian former footballer and current manager. He last worked as the manager of Oberlausitz Neugersdorf.

== Career ==
Born in Campo Grande, Vragel da Silva began his career in Brazil for Campo Grande. He went on to play in Denmark for Brøndby, and in Germany for Karlsruher SC and SSV Ulm.
