= Christian Ritter (footballer) =

German footballer

Personal information
- Full name: Christian Ritter
- Date of birth: 9 August 1984 (age 42)
- Place of birth: Berlin-Steglitz, West Germany
- Height: 1.78 m (5 ft 10 in)
- Position: Striker

Youth career
- Tasmania-Gropiusstadt

Senior career*
Years	Team	Apps	(Gls)
2001–2005	VfL Wolfsburg II	47	(9)
2004–2005	VfL Wolfsburg	1	(0)
2005–2006	Tennis Borussia Berlin	5	(0)
2006	Tasmania-Gropiusstadt		
2006–2007	Sportfreunde Lotte	7	(1)
2007–2009	Berliner FC Dynamo	39	(20)
- * Club domestic league appearances and goals

Christian Ritter (born 9 August 1984) is a German former football player.

Ritter made one Bundesliga appearance for VfL Wolfsburg, replacing Martin Petrov in a 3–1 win over 1860 Munich in February 2004.
