= Robson Ponte =

Brazilian footballer

Personal information
- Date of birth: 6 November 1976 (age 49)
- Place of birth: São Paulo, Brazil
- Height: 1.74 m (5 ft 9 in)
- Position: Attacking midfielder

Senior career*
Years	Team	Apps	(Gls)
1995–1996	CA Juventus		
1997	América-SP		
1998–1999	Guarani	32	(16)
1999–2005	Bayer Leverkusen	79	(6)
2001–2003	→ VfL Wolfsburg (loan)	61	(13)
2005–2010	Urawa Reds	144	(33)
2011	Grêmio Barueri	6	(0)
- * Club domestic league appearances and goals

Robson Ponte (born 6 November 1976) is a Brazilian former footballer who played as an attacking midfielder. He spent most of his career at Bayer 04 Leverkusen in Germany and Urawa Red Diamonds in Japan.

== Club career ==
Ponte was born in São Paulo.

After impressing in a friendly match between his club Guarani and Bayer 04 Leverkusen in early 1999, he was offered a contract by a Bundesliga club in August 1999. He played for three seasons at Leverkusen. In the month of his transfer, German techno label Kompakt released a single entitled 'Robson Ponte'.

Before the 2001–02 season started, Ponte moved on loan to another Bundesliga side VfL Wolfsburg. At Wolfsburg, he managed 61 appearances in two seasons and scored 13 goals.

Ponte signed on a free transfer with Japanese giants Urawa Red Diamonds before his contract with Leverkusen expired in July 2005. He, an all-around midfielder, took both penalty kicks and corners for Urawa for five seasons. In 2007, he received the Most Valuable Player award of the season.

Ponte ended his playing career with foreign professional leagues in 2010 and returned to his country, Brazil, to spend his last years. He joined Grêmio Barueri on 26 May 2011.

== Career statistics ==
Appearances and goals by club, season and competition
Club	Season	League			National Cup		League Cup		Continental		Total	
Club	Season	Division	Apps	Goals	Apps	Goals	Apps	Goals	Apps	Goals	Apps	Goals
CA Juventus	1995	Paulista	24	14					-			
CA Juventus	1996	Paulista	26	12					-			
CA Juventus	Total											
América FC	1997	Paulista	4	1					-			
Guarani	1998	Série A	16	7					-			
Guarani	1999	Série A	16	9					-			
Guarani	Total											
Bayer Leverkusen	1999–00	Bundesliga	24	2	8	2	1	0	5	0	38	4
Bayer Leverkusen	2000–01	Bundesliga	12	0			1	0	3	1	16	1
Bayer Leverkusen	2003–04	Bundesliga	20	2	2	2	-		-		22	4
Bayer Leverkusen	2004–05	Bundesliga	23	2	2	1	1	0	8	1	34	4
Bayer Leverkusen	Total		79	6	12	5	3	0	16	2	110	13
VfL Wolfsburg (loan)	2001–02	Bundesliga	31	8	3	1	-					
VfL Wolfsburg (loan)	2002–03	Bundesliga	30	5	2	0	-		-		32	5
VfL Wolfsburg (loan)	Total		61	13	5	1	0	0	0	0	66	14
Urawa Reds	2005	J1 League	16	8	5	0	3	1	-		24	9
Urawa Reds	2006	J1 League	22	4	4	2	3	0	-		29	6
Urawa Reds	2007	J1 League	33	7	0	0	2	0	12	5	47	12
Urawa Reds	2008	J1 League	16	1	2	1	2	0	4	0	24	2
Urawa Reds	2009	J1 League	28	4	1	0	4	1	-		33	5
Urawa Reds	2010	J1 League	29	9	2	2	6	2	-		35	11
Urawa Reds	Total		144	33	14	6	20	4	16	5	194	47
Career total												

== Awards and honours ==
=== Club ===
Urawa Red Diamonds

- AFC Champions League: 2007
- J1 League: 2006
- Emperor's Cup: 2005, 2006
- Japanese Super Cup: 2006

=== Individual ===
- J. League Most Valuable Player: 2007
- J. League Best Eleven: 2007
