= Benjamin Siegert =

German former professional footballer (born 1981)

Personal information
- Date of birth: 7 July 1981 (age 45)
- Place of birth: Berlin, Germany
- Height: 1.73 m (5 ft 8 in)
- Position: Midfielder

Youth career
- 1988–1995: SV Mariendorf
- 1995–1998: Hertha Zehlendorf
- 1998–2000: Tennis Borussia Berlin

Senior career*
Years	Team	Apps	(Gls)
2000–2004	VfL Wolfsburg II	114	(24)
2000–2004	VfL Wolfsburg	1	(0)
2004–2007	Eintracht Braunschweig	96	(2)
2007–2009	SV Wehen Wiesbaden	59	(6)
2009–2011	VfL Osnabrück	64	(4)
2011–2015	Preußen Münster	121	(8)
2015–2016	Sportfreunde Lotte	26	(0)
2016–2017	Tennis Borussia Berlin	10	(0)
Total		491	(44)
- * Club domestic league appearances and goals

Benjamin Siegert (born 7 July 1981) is a German former professional footballer who played as a midfielder.

== Career ==
Siegert was born in Berlin. He made his debut on the professional league level in the Bundesliga for VfL Wolfsburg on 12 May 2001 when he came on as a substitute for Patrick Weiser in the 83rd minute in a game against Eintracht Frankfurt.

On 5 October 2007, he scored the fastest goal in the history of German professional football. He scored for SV Wehen Wiesbaden in the 8th second of the game against Greuther Fürth. On 26 June 2009, he left Wehen Wiesbaden and signed for VfL Osnabrück, where he spent two years before signing for Preußen Münster.
