= Emeka Ifejiagwa =

Nigerian footballer

Personal information
- Date of birth: 30 October 1977 (age 49)
- Place of birth: Aba, Nigeria
- Height: 1.84 m (6 ft 1/2 in)
- Position: Defender

Senior career*
Years	Team	Apps	(Gls)
1996–1997	Udoji United		
1998	Iwuanyanwo Nationale		
1998–1999	Charlton Athletic	0	(0)
1998–1999	→ Brighton & Hove Albion (loan)	2	(1)
1999–2000	CA Osasuna	4	(0)
2000–2003	VfL Wolfsburg	8	(0)
2002–2003	→ Waldhof Mannheim (loan)	28	(0)
2003–2007	Bendel Insurance		

International career
1997–2002	Nigeria	12	(0)
- * Club domestic league appearances and goals

Emeka Ifejiagwa (//; born 30 October 1977) is a Nigerian retired footballer.

== Career ==
Ifejiagwa played for Udoji United, Iwuanyanwo Nationale and Bendel Insurance in Nigeria, for Charlton Athletic and Brighton & Hove Albion in England, for CA Osasuna in Spain, and for VfL Wolfsburg and Waldhof Mannheim in Germany.

After retiring as a player due to injury, Ifejiagwa began to work for Globalsports Advertisement in Barcelona, Spain.
