= Michael Habryka =

German-Slovak footballer

Personal information
- Date of birth: 6 April 1982 (age 44)
- Height: 1.74 m (5 ft 9 in)
- Position: Midfielder

Youth career
- TSV Berenbostel
- TSV Havelse
- Hannover 96
- VfL Wolfsburg

Senior career*
Years	Team	Apps	(Gls)
2001–2004	VfL Wolfsburg II		
2001–2004	VfL Wolfsburg	4	(0)
2004	TSV Havelse		
2005	Werder Bremen II	16	(1)
2006–2008	1. FC Magdeburg	65	(2)
2009	SC Langenhagen		
2009–2011	TSV Havelse		
2011–2012	SC Langenhagen		
2012–2013	OSV Hannover		
2013–2016	TSV Stelingen		
- * Club domestic league appearances and goals

Michael Habryka (born 6 April 1982) is a German retired professional footballer who played as a midfielder. He also holds Slovak citizenship. He spent three seasons in the Bundesliga with VfL Wolfsburg.
