= Michał Janicki =

Polish footballer

Personal information
- Date of birth: 29 September 1982 (age 44)
- Place of birth: Słomniki, Poland
- Height: 1.80 m (5 ft 11 in)
- Position: Striker

Youth career
- Słomniczanka Słomniki
- SMS Kraków
- 1997–1998: Borussia Dortmund
- 1998: AFC Ajax

Senior career*
Years	Team	Apps	(Gls)
1999	Wawel Kraków		
1999–2000	Pogoń Szczecin		
2001–2005	VfL Wolfsburg II	74	(45)
2002–2004	VfL Wolfsburg	2	(0)
2005–2006	Eintracht Braunschweig	4	(0)
2005–2006	Eintracht Braunschweig II	21	(6)
2006	Zagłębie Sosnowiec	0	(0)
2007	FC Gütersloh 2000		
2007	Stal Stalowa Wola	3	(0)
2008	Hutnik Kraków	6	(0)
2018	PFC Victoria London		

International career
- Poland U16
- Poland U17
Medal record
Men's football
Representing Poland
UEFA European Under-16 Championship
Runner-up	1999 Czech Republic
- * Club domestic league appearances and goals

Michał Janicki (born 29 September 1982) is a Polish former professional footballer who played as a striker. He spent two seasons in the Bundesliga with VfL Wolfsburg.

== Personal life ==
In 2018 he played for English non-league club PFC Victoria London.

== Honours ==
Poland U16

- UEFA European Under-16 Championship runner-up: 1999
