= Sven Müller (footballer, born 1980) =

German footballer

Personal information
- Full name: Sven Müller
- Date of birth: 4 April 1980 (age 46)
- Place of birth: Burgau, West Germany
- Height: 1.91 m (6 ft 3 in)
- Positions: Defender; midfielder

Youth career
- 1986–1992: TSV Burgau
- 1992–1997: TSG Thannhausen
- 1997–1998: 1860 Munich

Senior career*
Years	Team	Apps	(Gls)
1998–2000	FC Augsburg		
2000–2004	VfL Wolfsburg	50	(3)
2004–2006	1. FC Nürnberg	66	(4)
2006–2008	1. FC Kaiserslautern	62	(3)
2009–2010	Erzgebirge Aue	39	(2)
2010–2012	FSV Frankfurt	42	(3)
2011	FSV Frankfurt II	4	(0)

International career
2000–2001	Germany U-21	5	(0)
2003–2004	Germany B	4	(0)
- * Club domestic league appearances and goals

Sven Müller (born 4 April 1980) is a German former professional footballer who played as a defender or midfielder.

== Club career ==
Müller was born in Burgau, West Germany. As a youth he played for his hometown team TSV Burgau before joining TSG Thannhausen and later the youth of TSV 1860 Munich. From 1998 to 2000 he played for FC Augsburg at amateur level before joining the Bundesliga member VfL Wolfsburg.

In January 2004, he changed clubs and went to 1. FC Nürnberg one league below but returned with them the same year to the highest German football league. The following year he had a place in the first eleven but after his former Wolfsburg manager Wolfgang Wolf left the club he did not play anymore so he followed him to famous 2. Bundesliga club 1. FC Kaiserslautern where he could return to his old strength. He moved to FC Erzgebirge Aue on 20 January 2009.

== International career ==
Müller played five times for the Germany U-21 in 2000 and 2001.

== Honours ==
1. FC Nürnberg

- Bundesliga promotion: 2003–04
