= Kim Madsen =

Danish footballer (born 1978)

Personal information
- Full name: Kim Albrekt Madsen
- Date of birth: 13 February 1978 (age 48)
- Place of birth: Roskilde, Denmark
- Height: 1.88 m (6 ft 2 in)
- Position: Central defender

Youth career
- 1984–1991: Svogerslev BK
- 1991–1995: B1906 Svogerslev
- 1995–1996: KB

Senior career*
Years	Team	Apps	(Gls)
1996–2002	F.C. Copenhagen	77	(1)
1997–1998	→ Køge BK (loan)	16	(2)
2002–2004	VfL Wolfsburg	13	(1)
2004–2007	Hansa Rostock	58	(1)
2007–2010	AGF	36	(0)
Total		200	(4)

International career
1994–1997	Denmark U19	3	(0)
1998–1999	Denmark U21	9	(0)

Managerial career
- 2014: Karlslunde IF
- * Club domestic league appearances and goals

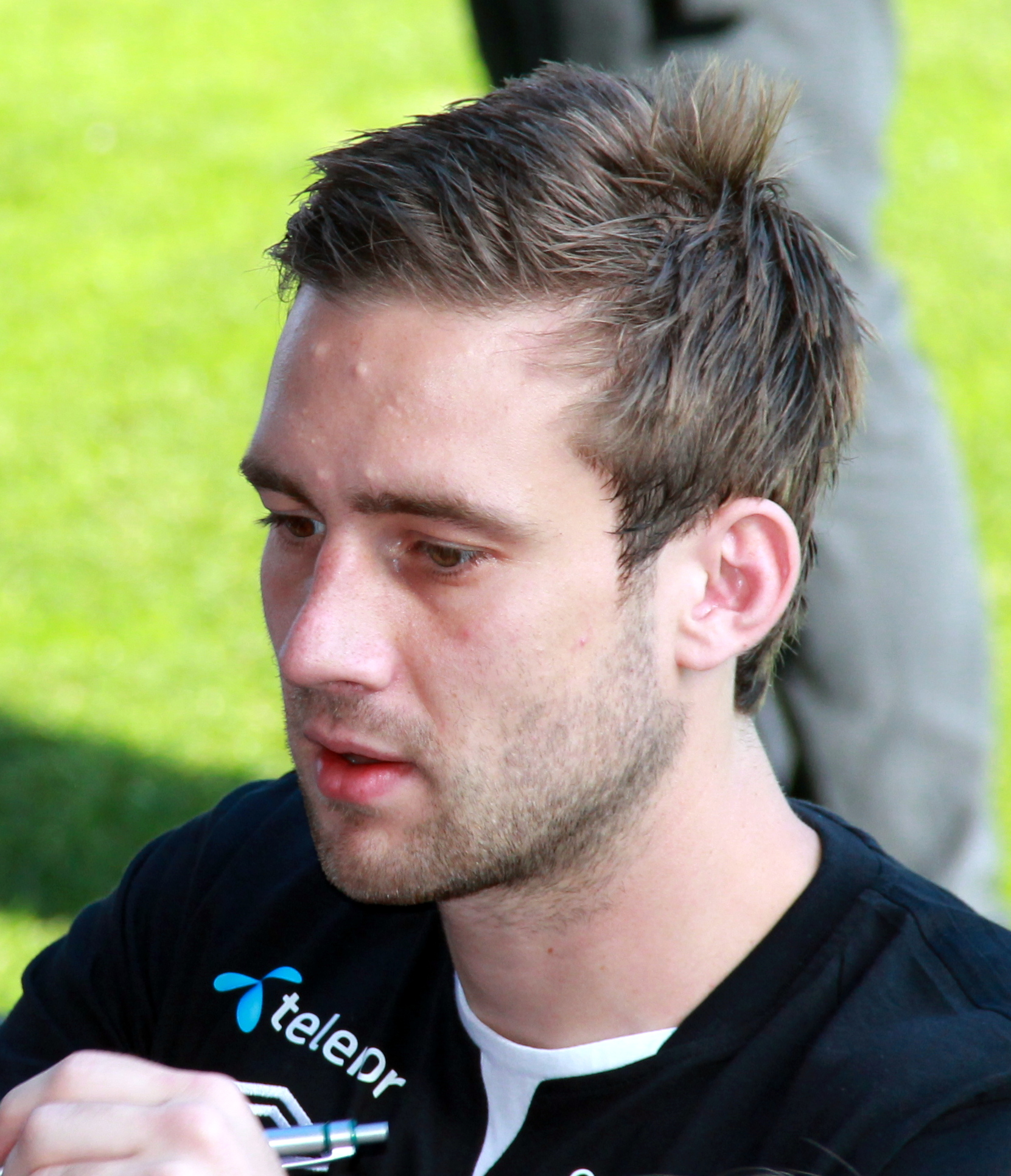
Kim André Madsen, footballer for Strømsgodset and Norway national team

Kim Madsen (born 13 February 1978) is a Danish former professional footballer who played as a defender. He played nine games for various Danish youth national team selections.

After his career as a player, he shortly managed Karlslunde IF alongside David Rasmussen and Poul Hübertz in 2014.

== Honours ==
FC Copenhagen

- Danish Superliga: 2000–01
- Danish Super Cup: 2001
