= Marino Biliškov =

Croatian footballer (born 1976)

Personal information
- Date of birth: 17 March 1976 (age 50)
- Place of birth: Split, SFR Yugoslavia
- Height: 1.95 m (6 ft 5 in)
- Position: Defender

Youth career
- 1983–1993: Hajduk Split

Senior career*
Years	Team	Apps	(Gls)
1993–1994	NK Val Kaštel Stari		
1994–1995	Trogir		
1995–1996	NK Jadran Kaštel Sućurac		
1996–1997	RNK Split		
1997–1998	Uskok		
1998–1999	Hajduk Split	26	(2)
1999–2005	VfL Wolfsburg	117	(8)
2005–2006	MSV Duisburg	21	(1)
2006–2007	Iraklis	23	(0)
2007–2010	Greuther Fürth	88	(5)
2011–2013	FC Ingolstadt 04	59	(2)
- * Club domestic league appearances and goals

Marino Biliškov (born 17 March 1976) is a Croatian former footballer who played as a defender spending many years in the top two divisions of German football.
