= 2003–04 Bundesliga =

41st season of the Bundesliga

Bundesliga
- Season: 2003–04
- Dates: 1 August 2003 – 22 May 2004
- Champions: Werder Bremen; 4th Bundesliga title 4th German title
- Relegated: 1. FC Köln; 1860 Munich; Eintracht Frankfurt
- Champions League: Werder Bremen; Bayern Munich; Bayer Leverkusen
- UEFA Cup: Stuttgart; Bochum; Alemannia Aachen
- Intertoto Cup: Borussia Dortmund; Schalke 04; Hamburger SV; Wolfsburg
- Matches: 306
- Goals: 909 (2.97 per match)
- Top goalscorer: Aílton (28)

The 2003–04 Bundesliga was the 41st season of the Bundesliga, Germany's premier football league. It began on 1 August 2003 and concluded on 22 May 2004.

== Teams ==
Eighteen teams competed in the league – the top fifteen teams from the previous season and the three teams promoted from the 2. Bundesliga. The promoted teams were SC Freiburg, 1. FC Köln and Eintracht Frankfurt. SC Freiburg and 1. FC Köln returned to the top flight after an absence of one year while Eintracht Frankfurt returned to the top fight after an absence of two years. They replaced Arminia Bielefeld, 1. FC Nürnberg and Energie Cottbus, ending their top flight spells of one, two and three years respectively.

== Team overview ==
Location of teams in Bundesliga 2003–04

=== Stadiums ===
Club	Location	Ground	Capacity
Hertha BSC	Berlin	Olympiastadion	76,000
VfL Bochum	Bochum	Ruhrstadion	36,000
SV Werder Bremen	Bremen	Weserstadion	36,000
Borussia Dortmund	Dortmund	Westfalenstadion	68,600
Eintracht Frankfurt*	Frankfurt	Waldstadion	62,000
SC Freiburg*	Freiburg	Dreisamstadion	25,000
Hamburger SV	Hamburg	AOL Arena	62,000
Hannover 96	Hanover	Niedersachsenstadion	60,400
1. FC Kaiserslautern	Kaiserslautern	Fritz Walter Stadion	41,500
1. FC Köln*	Cologne	Müngersdorfer Stadion	46,000
Bayer 04 Leverkusen	Leverkusen	BayArena	22,500
Borussia Mönchengladbach	Mönchengladbach	Bökelbergstadion	34,500
TSV 1860 Munich	Munich	Olympiastadion	63,000
FC Bayern Munich	Munich	Olympiastadion	63,000
FC Hansa Rostock	Rostock	Ostseestadion	25,850
FC Schalke 04	Gelsenkirchen	Arena AufSchalke	61,973
VfB Stuttgart	Stuttgart	Gottlieb-Daimler-Stadion	53,700
VfL Wolfsburg	Wolfsburg	Volkswagen Arena	30,000

(*) Promoted from 2. Bundesliga.

=== Personnel and sponsoring ===
Team	Manager	Kit manufacturer	Shirt sponsor
TSV 1860 Munich	(Netherlands) Gerald Vanenburg	Nike	Liqui Moly
Bayer 04 Leverkusen	(Germany) Klaus Augenthaler	Adidas	RWE
FC Bayern Munich	(Switzerland) Ottmar Hitzfeld	Adidas	T-Mobile/Deutsche Telekom (in UEFA matches)
VfL Bochum	(Germany) Peter Neururer	Nike	DWS
Borussia Dortmund	(Germany) Matthias Sammer	Goool.de	E.ON
Borussia Mönchengladbach	(Germany) Holger Fach	Lotto	Jever
Eintracht Frankfurt	(Germany) Willi Reimann	Jako	Fraport
SC Freiburg	(Germany) Volker Finke	Jako	NaturEnergie
Hamburger SV	(Germany) Klaus Toppmöller	Nike	Abu Dhabi Investment Group
Hannover 96	(Germany) Ewald Lienen	Uhlsport	TUI Group
FC Hansa Rostock	(Germany) Juri Schlünz	Jako	Vita Cola
Hertha BSC	(Germany) Hans Meyer	Nike	Arcor
1. FC Kaiserslautern	(Austria) Kurt Jara	Kappa	Deutsche Vermögensberatung
1. FC Köln	(Switzerland) Marcel Koller	Saller	funny-frisch
FC Schalke 04	(Germany) Jupp Heynckes	Adidas	Victoria Versicherung
VfB Stuttgart	(Germany) Felix Magath	Puma	Debitel
SV Werder Bremen	(Germany) Thomas Schaaf	Kappa	Young Spirit
VfL Wolfsburg	(Germany) Jürgen Röber	Puma	Volkswagen

== League table ==
Pos	Team	Pld	W	D	L	GF	GA	GD	Pts	Qualification or relegation
1	Werder Bremen (C)	34	22	8	4	79	38	+41	74	Qualification to Champions League group stage
2	Bayern Munich	34	20	8	6	70	39	+31	68	Qualification to Champions League group stage
3	Bayer Leverkusen	34	19	8	7	73	39	+34	65	Qualification to Champions League third qualifying round
4	VfB Stuttgart	34	18	10	6	52	24	+28	64	Qualification to UEFA Cup first round
5	VfL Bochum	34	15	11	8	57	39	+18	56	Qualification to UEFA Cup first round
6	Borussia Dortmund	34	16	7	11	59	48	+11	55	Qualification to Intertoto Cup third round
7	Schalke 04	34	13	11	10	49	42	+7	50	Qualification to Intertoto Cup third round
8	Hamburger SV	34	14	7	13	47	60	−13	49	Qualification to Intertoto Cup third round
9	Hansa Rostock	34	12	8	14	55	54	+1	44	
10	VfL Wolfsburg	34	13	3	18	56	61	−5	42	Qualification to Intertoto Cup second round (Note: Hansa Rostock did not apply for Intertoto Cup, so the place was given to VfL Wolfsburg.)
11	Borussia Mönchengladbach	34	10	9	15	40	49	−9	39	
12	Hertha BSC	34	9	12	13	42	59	−17	39	
13	SC Freiburg	34	10	8	16	42	67	−25	38	
14	Hannover 96	34	9	10	15	49	63	−14	37	
15	1. FC Kaiserslautern (Note: 1. FC Kaiserslautern were docked three points for financial irregularities.)	34	11	6	17	39	62	−23	36	
16	Eintracht Frankfurt (R)	34	9	5	20	36	53	−17	32	Relegation to 2. Bundesliga
17	1860 Munich (R)	34	8	8	18	32	55	−23	32	Relegation to 2. Bundesliga
18	1. FC Köln (R)	34	6	5	23	32	57	−25	23	Relegation to 2. Bundesliga

Source: kicker.de
Rules for classification: 1) points; 2) goal difference; 3) number of goals scored.
(C) Champions; (R) Relegated

== Results ==
Home \ Away	BSC	BOC	SVW	BVB	SGE	SCF	HSV	H96	FCK	KOE	B04	BMG	M60	FCB	ROS	S04	VFB	WOB
Hertha BSC	—	1–1	0–3	6–2	1–2	0–0	1–1	2–3	3–0	3–1	1–4	2–1	1–1	1–1	1–1	1–3	1–0	1–0
VfL Bochum	2–2	—	0–0	3–0	1–0	3–0	1–1	3–1	4–0	4–0	1–0	1–0	4–0	1–0	0–0	1–2	0–0	1–0
Werder Bremen	4–0	3–1	—	2–0	3–1	1–1	6–0	0–0	1–0	3–2	2–6	1–1	2–1	1–1	3–0	4–1	1–3	5–3
Borussia Dortmund	1–1	4–1	2–1	—	2–0	1–0	3–2	6–2	1–1	1–0	2–2	3–1	3–1	2–0	4–1	0–1	0–2	4–0
Eintracht Frankfurt	0–0	3–2	0–1	0–1	—	3–0	2–3	2–2	1–3	2–0	1–2	3–1	0–3	1–1	1–1	3–0	0–2	3–2
SC Freiburg	2–3	4–2	2–4	2–2	1–0	—	0–0	4–1	1–0	3–0	1–0	4–1	1–0	0–6	2–2	2–1	0–1	3–2
Hamburger SV	2–0	1–1	1–1	0–2	2–1	4–1	—	0–3	3–2	4–2	3–1	2–1	3–1	0–2	2–1	2–2	2–1	2–0
Hannover 96	1–3	2–2	1–5	1–1	3–0	3–0	3–2	—	0–1	1–0	2–2	2–0	1–1	3–3	3–3	1–2	0–1	0–0
1. FC Kaiserslautern	4–2	2–2	0–1	1–1	1–0	2–2	4–0	1–0	—	1–0	0–0	2–2	0–1	0–2	3–2	0–2	1–0	3–2
1. FC Köln	3–0	1–2	1–4	1–0	2–0	1–0	0–1	1–2	1–2	—	0–0	1–0	1–3	1–2	4–0	0–2	2–2	2–3
Bayer Leverkusen	4–1	1–3	1–3	3–0	1–2	4–1	1–0	4–0	6–0	2–0	—	1–0	2–2	1–3	3–0	3–1	2–0	4–2
Borussia Mönchengladbach	1–1	2–2	1–2	2–1	0–2	2–2	3–0	1–0	2–1	1–0	0–0	—	3–1	0–0	1–1	2–0	0–1	0–2
1860 Munich	1–1	3–1	0–2	0–2	1–0	1–1	1–2	0–2	2–1	2–1	1–1	1–2	—	0–1	1–4	1–1	0–3	1–0
Bayern Munich	4–1	2–0	1–3	4–1	3–1	2–0	1–0	3–1	4–1	2–2	3–3	5–2	1–0	—	3–3	2–1	1–0	2–0
Hansa Rostock	0–1	0–2	3–1	2–1	3–0	4–1	3–0	3–1	4–0	1–1	0–2	1–2	3–0	1–2	—	3–1	0–2	3–1
Schalke 04	3–0	0–2	0–0	2–2	1–1	3–0	4–1	2–2	4–1	2–1	2–3	2–1	0–0	2–0	0–1	—	0–0	1–1
VfB Stuttgart	0–0	1–1	4–4	1–0	3–1	4–1	0–0	3–1	2–0	0–0	2–3	1–1	2–0	3–1	2–0	0–0	—	1–0
VfL Wolfsburg	3–0	3–2	0–2	2–4	1–0	4–0	5–1	2–1	4–1	2–0	0–1	1–3	3–1	3–2	3–1	1–1	1–5	—

Source: DFB
Legend: Blue = home team win; Yellow = draw; Red = away team win.

== Overall ==
- Most wins - Werder Bremen (22)
- Fewest wins - 1. FC Köln (6)
- Most draws - Hertha BSC (12)
- Fewest draws - VfL Wolfsburg (3)
- Most losses - 1. FC Köln (23)
- Fewest losses - Werder Bremen (4)
- Most goals scored - Werder Bremen (79)
- Fewest goals scored - 1860 Munich and 1. FC Köln (32)
- Most goals conceded - SC Freiburg (67)
- Fewest goals conceded - VfB Stuttgart (24)

== Top goalscorers ==
Rank	Player	Club	Goals
1	(Brazil) Aílton	Werder Bremen	28
2	(Netherlands) Roy Makaay	Bayern Munich	23
3	(Germany) Martin Max	Hansa Rostock	20
4	(Bulgaria) Dimitar Berbatov	Bayer Leverkusen	16
4	(Iran) Vahid Hashemian	VfL Bochum	16
4	(Czech Republic) Jan Koller	Borussia Dortmund	16
4	(Brazil) Ewerthon	Borussia Dortmund	16
8	(Argentina) Diego Klimowicz	VfL Wolfsburg	15
9	(Brazil) França	Bayer Leverkusen	14
10	(Croatia) Ivan Klasnić	Werder Bremen	13
10	(Denmark) Peter Madsen	VfL Bochum	13

== Attendances ==
No.	Team	Average	Change	Highest
1	Borussia Dortmund	79,618	17,4%	83,000
2	Schalke 04	61,041	0,8%	61,266
3	Bayern München	55,118	6,2%	69,000
4	Hamburger SV	48,074	5,4%	55,500
5	VfB Stuttgart	42,940	24,2%	54,088
6	Hertha BSC	40,087	-4,8%	60,800
7	1. FC Köln	40,058	51,4%	50,997
8	1. FC Kaiserslautern	38,618	6,5%	47,315
9	Werder Bremen	37,666	14,6%	43,000
10	Borussia Mönchengladbach	32,276	11,6%	34,500
11	TSV 1860	28,659	8,9%	69,000
12	VfL Bochum	27,189	8,8%	32,645
13	Eintracht Frankfurt	26,321	61,8%	37,500
14	SC Freiburg	24,162	13,8%	25,000
15	Hannover 96	23,358	-36,0%	27,537
16	VfL Wolfsburg	23,046	19,9%	30,000
17	Bayer Leverkusen	22,500	0,0%	22,500
18	Hansa Rostock	22,371	12,7%	29,800
