= Patrick Platins =

German footballer

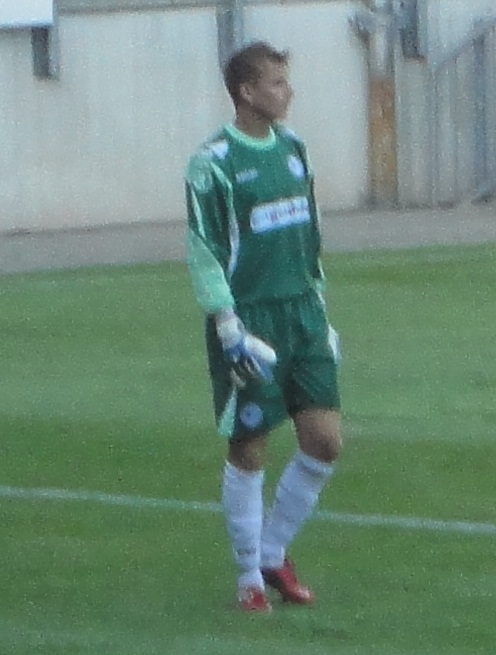
- Platins with Arminia Bielefeld in 2011

Personal information
- Date of birth: 19 April 1983 (age 43)
- Place of birth: Immenstadt, West Germany
- Height: 1.90 m (6 ft 3 in)
- Position: Goalkeeper

Youth career
- SV Martinszell
- TSV Marktoberdorf
- FSV Marktoberdorf
- FV Rot-Weiß Weiler
- 2000–2002: VfL Wolfsburg

Senior career*
Years	Team	Apps	(Gls)
2002–2009	VfL Wolfsburg II	122	(0)
2002–2009	VfL Wolfsburg	0	(0)
2008	→ FC Augsburg (loan)	0	(0)
2010–2014	Arminia Bielefeld	81	(0)
2010–2014	Arminia Bielefeld II	12	(0)
2014–2016	Darmstadt 98	0	(0)
Total		215	(0)
- * Club domestic league appearances and goals

Patrick Platins (born 19 April 1983) is a German former professional footballer who played as a goalkeeper.

== Career ==
Platins was born in Immenstadt. He began to play for VfL Wolfsburg II, the reserve team of VfL Wolfsburg in 2002. In a short time he got his first professional contract and became the third or fourth reserve goalkeeper of the first team but he was not able to gain a match for the first team in the Bundesliga.

In 2008, Platins was loaned to FC Augsburg for half a year but did not play. At the beginning of 2009–10 season he returned to VfL Wolfsburg, where he only played for the reserve team again.

After the season his contract was not renewed. In February 2010, he joined Arminia Bielefeld, after the reserve goalkeeper Rowen Fernandez was injured during a match. In the last matchday of 2009–10 season he made his debut in the 2. Bundesliga.
