= Diego Klimowicz =

Argentine footballer

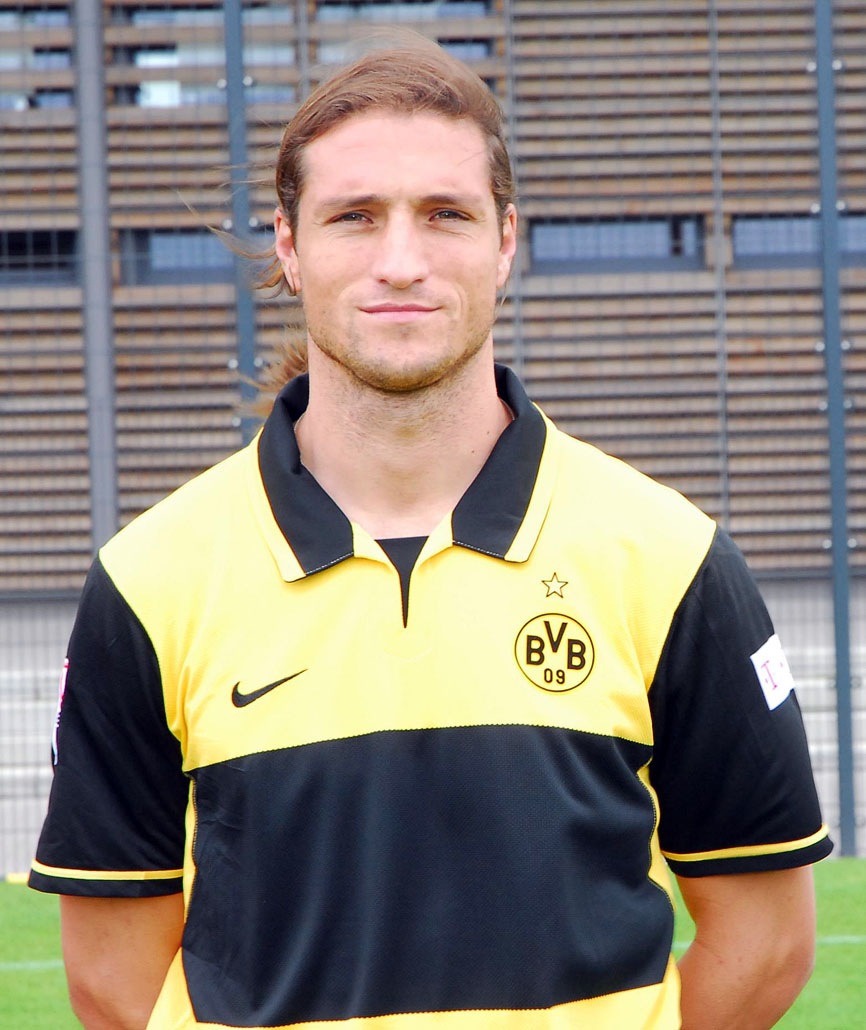
- Klimowicz as a Borussia Dortmund player

Personal information
- Full name: Diego Fernando Klimowicz
- Date of birth: 6 July 1974 (age 52)
- Place of birth: Quilmes, Argentina
- Height: 1.91 m (6 ft 3 in)
- Position: Centre-forward

Senior career*
Years	Team	Apps	(Gls)
1993–1996	Instituto	57	(12)
1996–1997	Rayo Vallecano	46	(12)
1997–1999	Valladolid	41	(4)
1999–2001	Lanús	77	(41)
2001–2007	VfL Wolfsburg	149	(57)
2007–2009	Borussia Dortmund	38	(6)
2009–2010	VfL Bochum	26	(8)
2011	Instituto	10	(1)
Total		444	(141)
- * Club domestic league appearances and goals

Diego Fernando Klimowicz (born 6 July 1974) is an Argentine former professional footballer who played as a centre-forward.

He started and finished his 18-year professional career with Instituto, but competed mostly in Spain and Germany, notably amassing Bundesliga totals of 213 games and 71 goals in the latter country.

== Club career ==
Born in Quilmes, Buenos Aires, Klimowicz started his career at Instituto Atlético Central Córdoba in the Primera B Nacional. He was sold to Rayo Vallecano of La Liga in 1996, scoring 11 goals in his first season but being relegated to Segunda División; the latter club was later banned from buying or selling foreign players, for failing to pay the accorded sum of 240 million pesetas.

Klimowicz returned to the Spanish top division in December 1997, when he signed a four-and-a-half-year contract with Real Valladolid. After netting just seven times across all competitions during his spell at the Estadio José Zorrilla, however, he returned to his country in 1999 and joined Club Atlético Lanús.

Klimowicz was transferred to VfL Wolfsburg in December 2001, going on to remain in Germany – and its Bundesliga – for the better part of the following decade. He netted a career-best 15 goals in the 2003–04 campaign, helping his team finish in tenth place.

In May 2007, Klimowicz moved to fellow league side Borussia Dortmund on a two-year deal. On 25 August, his brace was crucial to the hosts' 3–0 home defeat of Energie Cottbus. He added four goals in their runner-up run in the DFB-Pokal, being booked as a second-half substitute in the decisive match, lost 2–1 to Bayern Munich after extra time.

In the 2008–09 winter transfer window, Klimowicz signed with VfL Bochum. On 2 March 2010, the 35-year-old announced his retirement from professional football due to a hip injury;

Klimowicz decided to come back from retirement on 24 December 2010, and re-joined his first team Instituto on a one-year contract.

== International career ==
In 2001, there were talks of Klimowicz playing either for the Poland or the Ukraine national teams, but at the end nothing became materialised.

== Personal life ==
Klimowicz's younger brother, Javier, was also a footballer, as well as his other sibling Nicolás; a goalkeeper, Javier won caps for Ecuador. Klimowicz's grandfather was born in Poland before World War II, in a territory that later became part of Ukraine. His son Mateo currently plays for Atlético San Luis in Liga MX.

== Career statistics ==
Appearances and goals by club, season and competition
Club	Season	League			Cup		Continental		Total	
Club	Season	Division	Apps	Goals	Apps	Goals	Apps	Goals	Apps	Goals
Instituto	1993–94	Primera B Nacional			—					
Instituto	1994–95	Primera B Nacional			—					
Instituto	1995–96	Primera B Nacional			—					
Instituto	Total									
Rayo Vallecano	1996–97	La Liga	34	11	8	7	0	0	42	18
Rayo Vallecano	1997–98	Segunda División	12	1	2	0	0	0	14	2
Rayo Vallecano	Total		46	12	10	7	0	0	56	19
Valladolid	1997–98	La Liga	20	3	2	1	0	0	22	4
Valladolid	1998–99	La Liga	21	1	4	2	0	0	25	3
Valladolid	Total		41	4	6	3	0	0	47	7
Lanús	1999–00	Argentine Primera División	33	16	—				33	16
Lanús	2000–01	Argentine Primera División	30	17	—				30	17
Lanús	2001–02	Argentine Primera División	14	8	—				14	8
Lanús	Total		77	41	0	0			77	41
VfL Wolfsburg	2001–02	Bundesliga	17	10	1	0	0	0	18	10
VfL Wolfsburg	2002–03	Bundesliga	25	7	2	2	0	0	27	9
VfL Wolfsburg	2003–04	Bundesliga	33	15	2	1	8	5	43	21
VfL Wolfsburg	2004–05	Bundesliga	27	7	1	0	0	0	28	7
VfL Wolfsburg	2005–06	Bundesliga	26	12	1	1	6	1	33	14
VfL Wolfsburg	2006–07	Bundesliga	21	6	3	4	0	0	24	10
VfL Wolfsburg	Total		149	57	11	4	14	6	174	67
Borussia Dortmund	2007–08	Bundesliga	28	6	6	4	0	0	34	10
Borussia Dortmund	2008–09	Bundesliga	10	0	1	1	0	0	11	1
Borussia Dortmund	Total		38	6	7	5	0	0	45	11
VfL Bochum	2008–09	Bundesliga	11	4	0	0	0	0	11	4
VfL Bochum	2009–10	Bundesliga	15	4	2	1	0	0	17	5
VfL Bochum	Total		26	8	2	1	0	0	28	9
Instituto	2010–11	Primera B Nacional	10	1	—				10	1
Career total			387	129	36	20	14	6	437	155

== Honours ==
Borussia Dortmund

- DFB-Pokal runner-up: 2007–08
