= Hans Sarpei =

German-Ghanaian footballer (born 1976)

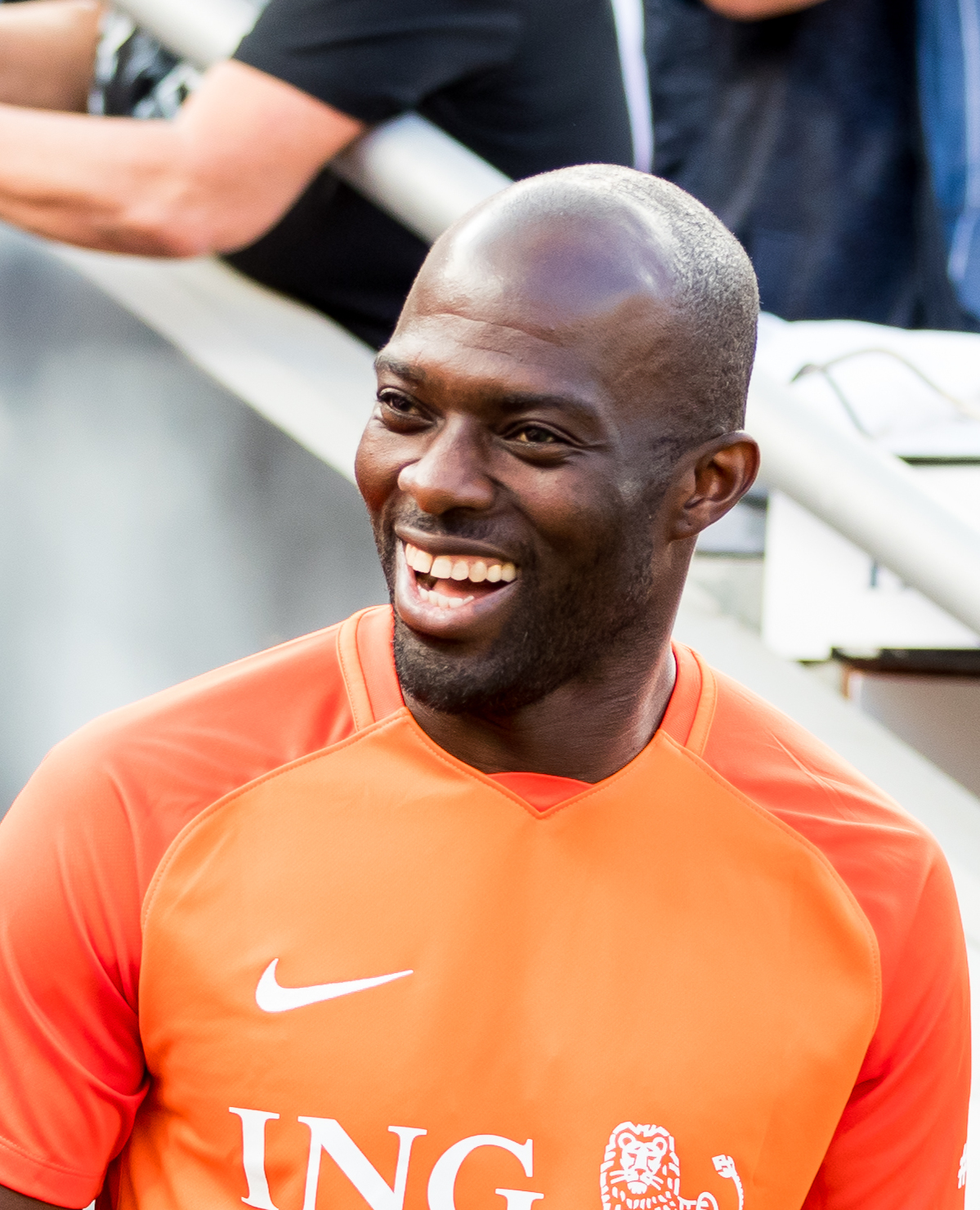
- Sarpei in 2019

Personal information
- Full name: Hans Adu Sarpei
- Date of birth: 28 June 1976 (age 50)
- Place of birth: Tema, Ghana
- Height: 1.78 m (5 ft 10 in)
- Position: Full-back

Youth career
- –1996: Chorweiler
- 1996–1997: Preußen Köln
- 1997–1998: Winfriedia Mülheim

Senior career*
Years	Team	Apps	(Gls)
1998–2000	Fortuna Köln	44	(0)
2000–2001	MSV Duisburg	20	(1)
2001–2007	VfL Wolfsburg	139	(2)
2001–2007	VfL Wolfsburg II	1	(0)
2007–2010	Bayer Leverkusen	42	(0)
2008–2009	Bayer Leverkusen II	3	(0)
2010–2012	Schalke 04	9	(0)
Total		258	(3)

International career
2000–2010	Ghana	36	(1)
- * Club domestic league appearances and goals

Hans Adu Sarpei (born 28 June 1976) is a Ghanaian former professional footballer who played as a full-back.

He also was a long time regular for the Ghana national team. Sarpei most recently played for his country at the 2010 FIFA World Cup in South Africa.

== Club career ==
Sarpei was born in Tema. He was with VfL Wolfsburg for six seasons, where he extended his contract until 30 June 2007 in February 2004. He joined Wolfsburg in 2001 and made over 130 appearances for the Wolves. At the end of the 2006–07 Bundesliga season, then Wolfsburg manager Klaus Augenthaler decided not to renew Sarpei's contract.

On 18 May 2007, Sarpei moved to Bayer Leverkusen on a free transfer signing a two-year deal.

== International career ==
Sarpei was a member of the Ghana national team. As such, he participated at the 2006 World Cup and the 2010 FIFA World Cup. He also received call-ups for the 2006 African Cup of Nations and the 2010 African Cup of Nations squads.

== Media career ==
In 2016, it was announced that Sarpei would be a host on the Netflix reality show Ultimate Beastmaster.

He portrayed Balthasar in the 2015 film 3 Türken und ein Baby.

== Personal life ==
Sarpei, who also has a German passport, moved to Germany from Ghana with his parents, when he was a child. His older brother, Edward, is a former Bundesliga player for 1. FC Köln, currently playing for BP Worringen. Sarpei enjoys his large Facebook followership which recoined various Chuck Norris facts on him.

== Honours ==
Schalke 04

- DFB-Pokal: 2010–11

Ghana

- Africa Cup of Nations: runner-up 2010; third place: 2008
