= Maik Franz =

German footballer (born 1981)

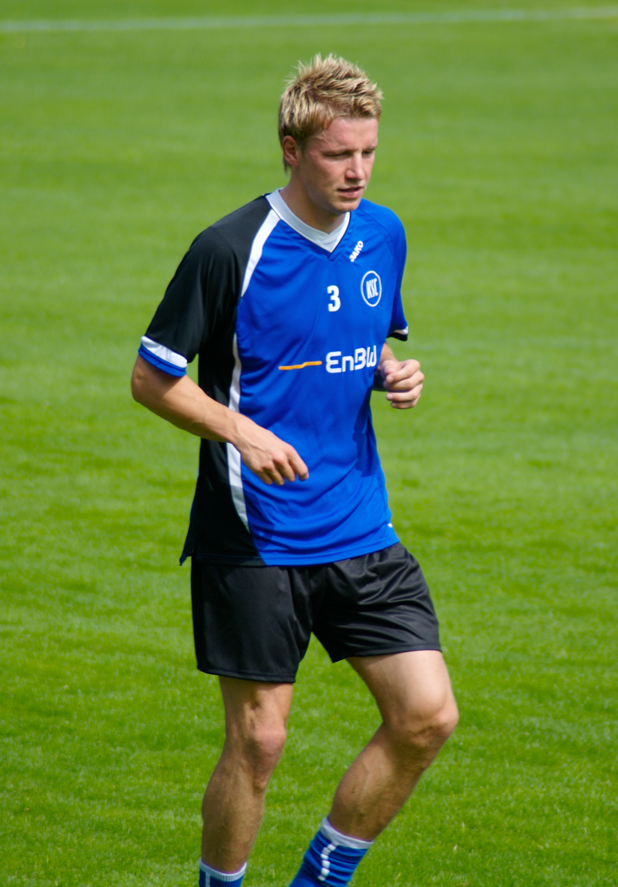

Personal information
- Full name: Maik Franz
- Date of birth: 5 August 1981 (age 45)
- Place of birth: Merseburg, East Germany
- Height: 1.90 m (6 ft 3 in)
- Position: Defender

Youth career
- 1987–1997: SV Langenstein

Senior career*
Years	Team	Apps	(Gls)
1997–1998	VfB Germania Halberstadt		
1998–2001	1. FC Magdeburg	29	(3)
2001–2006	VfL Wolfsburg	91	(2)
2006–2009	Karlsruher SC	75	(6)
2009–2011	Eintracht Frankfurt	50	(6)
2011–2014	Hertha BSC	16	(0)
2013–2014	Hertha BSC II	2	(0)

International career
2002–2004	Germany U-21	19	(1)
2002	Germany Team 2006	1	(0)
- * Club domestic league appearances and goals

Maik Franz (born 5 August 1981) is a German former footballer.

== Career ==
Franz was born in Merseburg, East Germany, and grew up in Langenstein near Halberstadt, where he began his football career, and joined 1. FC Magdeburg's youth division in the summer of 1998. As part of the A-Youth team, Franz won the DFB-Youth-Cup in 1999.

Franz played defence for 1. FC Magdeburg until 2001, when he transferred to VfL Wolfsburg, where he played the same position in the Bundesliga. In Wolfsburg, Franz distinguished himself through his strong tackling, winning 63 percent of his challenges, making him the club's best player in this respect. He played 91 Bundesliga-matches during his time in Wolfsburg, scoring twice.

In July 2006, Franz transferred to the 2. Bundesliga, joining Karlsruher SC. Together with Mario Eggimann, he formed the central defence of Karlsruhe's starting eleven, and with his Bundesliga experience, he played a crucial role in the club's promotion to the top flight. After a strong start in the 2008–09 season, both for Franz and his club, he extended his contract until 2011. After Eggimann transferred to Hannover 96 in the summer of 2008, Franz took over the captain's armband at Karlsruher SC.

Having sustained a serious injury to his right foot in October 2008, Franz had to undergo surgery in January of the following year, and was unable to play for three months. In April 2009, he celebrated his comeback in a home match against 1899 Hoffenheim.

After the KSC was relegated at the end of the 2008–09 season, Franz signed a contract with Eintracht Frankfurt, valid only for the Bundesliga. When Eintracht Frankfurt were also relegated to years later, Franz and the club were unable to agree on a contract that was also valid for the 2nd division.

On 24 June 2011, Hertha BSC announced they had signed Franz on a three-year deal, but due to frequent injury, made only seven appearances in his first season in Berlin.

On 6 February 2014 Franz was displaced to Hertha BSC II.

== Attributes ==
In the 2007–08 season, Franz was openly criticised for his playing style, which was distinguished by hard challenges and the continuous provocation of opposing players. The criticism reached its height in February 2008 following a match between VfB Stuttgart and Karlsruher SC. Stuttgart star Mario Gómez harshly criticised Franz for his style of play. Gómez later retracted his words but maintained his criticism of Franz. As a result, both criticism and support for Franz intensified, with KSC fans nicknaming him "Iron Maik". Following the release of an official report on the incident, the discussion gradually faded over the following weeks. In April 2011, Werder Bremen captain Torsten Frings and manager Thomas Schaaf criticised Franz for elbowing Denni Avdić in the face during an aerial challenge.

Due to his playing style, Franz was frequently booked. During the 2009–10 season, he donated 500 euros to charity for each of his eleven yellow cards. In the 2010–11 season, Franz was booked thirteen times in twenty-three matches.

== International career ==
On 12 February 2002, Franz made his debut for the Germany U21 national team against the Northern Ireland U21 national team. He was part of the German squad for the 2004 UEFA European Under-21 Championship, making his only appearance against Sweden.
