= Stefan Lorenz =

German footballer (born 1981)

Personal information
- Date of birth: 19 September 1981 (age 45)
- Place of birth: East Berlin, East Germany
- Height: 1.87 m (6 ft 2 in)
- Position: Defender

Team information
- Current team: Blau-Gelb Überruhr (player-coach)

Youth career
- –1998: BFC Dynamo
- 1998–2000: VfL Wolfsburg

Senior career*
Years	Team	Apps	(Gls)
2000–2005	VfL Wolfsburg II	147	(5)
2002–2005	VfL Wolfsburg	1	(0)
2005–2009	Rot-Weiss Essen	85	(2)
2009	SV Schermbeck	1	(0)
2009–2012	Wuppertaler SV	38	(2)
2014–2015	TuS Essen-West	25	(0)
2015	TuS Essen-West II	2	(0)
2017	VfB Frohnhausen II	2	(0)
2017–2018	SV Vonderort II	5	(2)
2018–2019	SV Vonderort	21	(8)
2019–	Blau-Gelb Überruhr	4	(0)

Managerial career
- 2010–2012: SV Vonderort (U15)
- 2012–2014: SV Rhenania (U19)
- 2014: TuS Essen-West (player-assistant)
- 2014–2015: TuS Essen-West (player-coach)
- 2015–2016: Rot-Weiss Essen (assistant)
- 2018–: Blau-Gelb Überruhr (player-coach)
- * Club domestic league appearances and goals

Stefan Lorenz (born 19 September 1981) is a German football manager and former player. He is currently a player-head coach at FC Blau-Gelb Überruhr.

Lorenz was the team captain of Rot-Weiss Essen and spent two seasons in the Bundesliga with VfL Wolfsburg.

== Playing career ==
Born in Berlin, Lorenz' career began with Berliner FC Dynamo. He then moved to VfL Wolfsburg, where he was mainly used in the amateur team in the Oberliga and Regionalliga. He only played one Bundesliga game at VfL.

In 2005 Lorenz went to Rot-Weiss Essen where he was the captain team captain. He played until the summer 2009, where his contract wasn't extended. He played 94 games for RWE and scored two goals.

== Coaching and later career ==
On 22 October 2009, it was announced that Lorenz would move to the 3. Liga club Wuppertaler SV. In September 2010, he was also working as a youth coach at SV Bottrop-Vonderort 1949, working together with his brother Michael Lorenz, beside his playing career at Wuppertaler. He ended his football career in the summer 2012 due to long-term knee problems.

On 1 July 2012, Lorenz left SV Bottrop-Vonderort 1949 and became U19 head coach at SV Rhenania Bottrop. Beside that, he also worked in the office of Rot-Weiss Essen, completing an apprenticeship as an event manager.

In 2014 Lorenz took over the position of player-assistant coach at TuS Essen-West. On 22 October 2014, he was promoted as player-head coach on an interim basis, which was made permanent in mid-December 2014. Loren managed to secure promotion the Landesliga.

In the summer 2015, he was appointed assistant coach at Rot-Weiss Essen. On 1 July 2016, he left the position to work in the sales department of the Jacob Stauder private brewery in Essen.

He returned to football in December 2016, joining VfB Frohnhausen as a team-manager. He also played a few games for the club's reserve team. In December 2017, he returned to SV Vonderort where he played until the summer 2019 (21 games and 8 goals for the club's first team, and 5 games for the reserve team). Beside that, he was appointed head coach of FC Blau-Gelb Überruhr at the end of December 2018. From the summer 2019, he also began playing games for the club.

== Personal life ==
His brother Michael Lorenz is also a professional footballer.
