= Stefan Schnoor =

German footballer

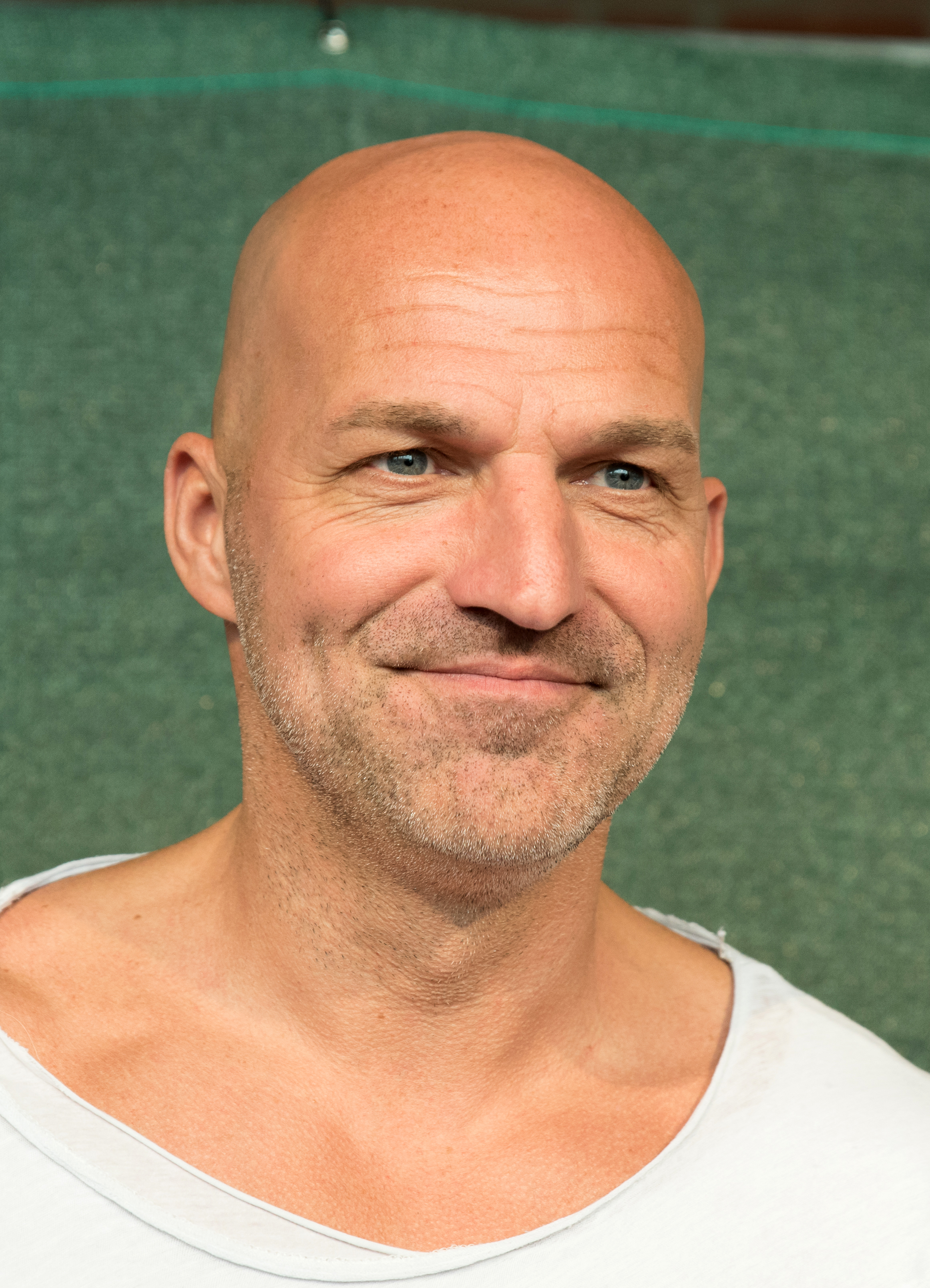
- Schnoor in 2016

Personal information
- Date of birth: 18 April 1971 (age 55)
- Place of birth: Neumünster, West Germany
- Height: 1.80 m (5 ft 11 in)
- Position: Defender

Youth career
- VfR Neumünster
- Olympia Neumünster

Senior career*
Years	Team	Apps	(Gls)
1991–1998	Hamburger SV	131	(8)
1998–2000	Derby County	60	(2)
2000–2006	VfL Wolfsburg	146	(7)
2006–2007	Holstein Kiel	6	(0)
2010–2011	Germania Schnelsen	15	(1)
Total		358	(18)
- * Club domestic league appearances and goals

Stefan Schnoor (born 18 April 1971) is a German former professional footballer who played as a defender.

== Career ==
=== As a player ===
Schnoor was born in Neumünster. He made his name at Hamburger SV. When Egon Coordes became the new Hamburg coach in the spring of 1992, he helped Schnoor, who had previously played for the HSV amateurs, to his first Bundesliga game on 20 March 1992. Under Coordes' successor Benno Möhlmann, Schnoor became a regular at HSV after he took office in autumn 1992 and received a professional contract in mid-December 1992.

In 1998 Schnoor moved to England to join Derby County but returned to the Bundesliga in November 2000. Since then, he has played for VfL Wolfsburg, where he was captain for a while.

After two and a half years in England, and scoring twice against Leicester City and Leeds United, he returned to Germany with VfL Wolfsburg in a swap deal involving Brian O'Neil. After that, he played for Holstein Kiel where he ended his playing career in 2007. After the end of the 2005/06 Bundesliga season, the contract was terminated by mutual agreement on 30 June 2006. He came to a total of 277 Bundesliga games and 15 goals.

In 2010, Schnoor returned to active play for one season in the fifth tier Oberliga with Hamburg amateur side Germania Schnelsen.

=== As an official ===
As of February 2009, he is a player agent. His agency, Kick and Rush GmbH, represents, among others, Colin Kazim-Richards, Mathias Jørgensen, Marcus Tudgay, Giles Barnes, Christopher Poulsen and Wayne Routledge.

From the end of August 2017 to mid-November 2019, Schnoor was sporting director of VfB Lübeck. In the 2021/22 season, he worked as technical director for the regional league team Phönix Lübeck, and then worked for the club as a consultant and in player scouting.

=== Other activities ===
Schnoor also works as a pundit for German TV station Sport1.

His marketing agency was insolvent in 2010, and he worked with the company Match-Marketing GmbH in player advice. According to media reports, insolvency proceedings were initiated against Schnoor at the end of June 2016. In November 2019, he became a full-time manager in sales at a Danish company that distributes disinfectants.

Schnoor has played regularly for St. Pauli HamburgAllstars since 2013 as part of the "Kicken mit Herz" benefit game, which has been held annually in the Hoheluft stadium in Hamburg since 2008, against the UKE medical team, Placebo Kickers Hamburg. With this annual event, the children's heart station of the University Hospital Hamburg-Eppendorf is supported.
