= Tomislav Marić =

German-born Croatian footballer

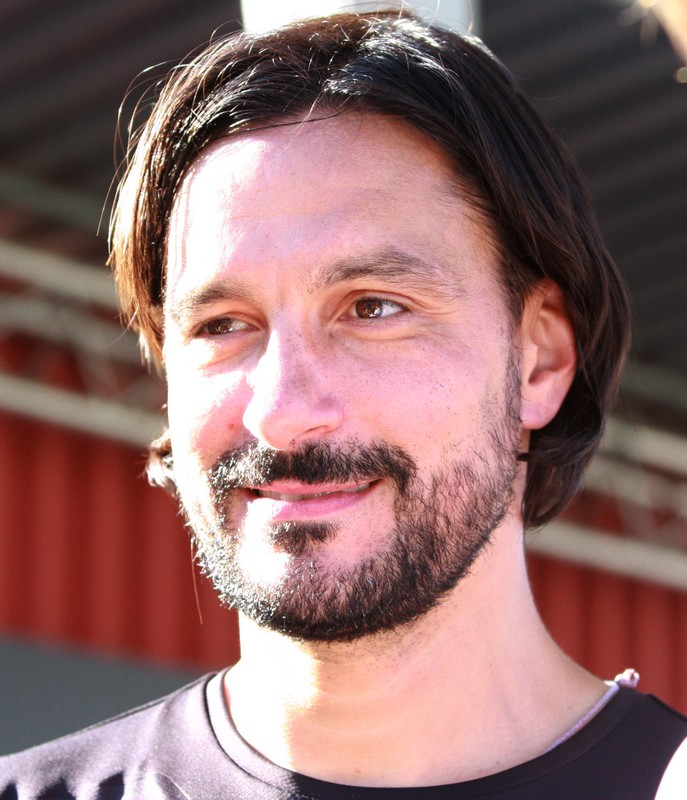
- Marić as assistant coach at VfB Stuttgart

Personal information
- Date of birth: 28 January 1973 (age 53)
- Place of birth: Heilbronn, West Germany
- Height: 1.81 m (5 ft 11 in)
- Position: Striker

Team information
- Current team: Dinamo Zagreb (assistant)

Youth career
- TSV Talheim
- ESV Heilbronn
- VfR Heilbronn

Senior career*
Years	Team	Apps	(Gls)
1992–1994	SpVgg 07 Ludwigsburg	59	(14)
1994–1995	Karlsruher SC	4	(0)
1995–1996	SG Wattenscheid 09	31	(7)
1996–2000	Stuttgarter Kickers	112	(42)
2000–2004	VfL Wolfsburg	85	(31)
2003–2004	VfL Wolfsburg II	12	(3)
2004	→ Borussia MG (loan)	7	(1)
2005	Urawa Reds	13	(8)
2006–2007	TSG Hoffenheim	47	(17)
Total		370	(123)

International career
2002–2003	Croatia	9	(2)

Managerial career
- 2007–2010: TSG Hoffenheim (assistant)
- 2013–2014: VfB Stuttgart (assistant)
- 2015–2016: Dunajská Streda
- 2026–: Dinamo Zagreb (assistant)
- * Club domestic league appearances and goals

Tomislav Marić (born 28 January 1973) is a German-born Croatian former professional footballer who played as a striker, and current assistant coach of Croatian Football League club Dinamo Zagreb.

Born in West Germany, he made nine appearances for the Croatia national team scoring twice.

== Club career ==
Marić was born to Bosnian Croat parents in Heilbronn, Baden-Württemberg and started his first-team career in 1992 at amateur side SpVgg 07 Ludwigsburg from the nearby Ludwigsburg in then third-division Oberliga Baden-Württemberg. He spent two seasons with the third-division side, making 60 league appearances in which he scored 14 goals. In July 1994, he signed his first professional contract with then Bundesliga side Karlsruher SC, but never managed to become a regular at the club, making only four Bundesliga appearances as a second-half substitute throughout the 1994–95 season of the league. He made his Bundesliga debut on 7 October 1994 in KSC's 1–0 defeat away against Eintracht Frankfurt, playing as a substitute in the last five minutes of the match. After this unsuccessful season with KSC, he went on to move to then 2. Bundesliga side SG Wattenscheid 09 for the 1995–96 season. He made 31 appearances and scored seven goals for the club in the 2. Bundesliga during the season after which he went on to move to another 2. Bundesliga side at the time, Stuttgarter Kickers.

He subsequently spent four seasons with the Kickers team and was a regular from the beginning. In his final season with the club, in 1999–2000, he became the top goalscorer of the 2. Bundesliga with 21 goals scored in 33 matches and practically saved the club from being relegated to the third division as his 21 goals were almost a half of all goals scored by the team in the 2. Bundesliga that season in which they narrowly avoided relegation with a 15th-place finish. In the same season, he also helped the club to surprisingly reach the semifinals of the DFB-Pokal, where they lost 2–1 to Bundesliga side Werder Bremen in extra time. In four seasons with Stuttgarter Kickers, Marić made 112 2. Bundesliga appearances and scored 42 goals for the club in the league, a half of which was in his final season with the club.

Marić went on to leave Stuttgarter Kickers for Bundesliga side VfL Wolfsburg in the summer of 2000 and became a regular in the team during his first season with the club, making 30 Bundesliga appearances in which he managed to score six goals. He scored his first Bundesliga goal when he netted the fifth goal in VfL Wolfsburg's 6–0 victory over 1. FC Köln on 21 October 2000. In the 2001–02 season, he managed to score 12 goals in only 17 Bundesliga appearances and was VfL Wolfsburg's most successful goalscorer that season as well as in the following 2002–03 season, when he once again scored 12 goals, but also played ten matches more than in the preceding season. However, he lost his place in the team for the 2003–04 season and did not make any Bundesliga appearances before moving to Borussia Mönchengladbach in January 2004. He spent only six months with the Gladbach team and managed to score only one goal in seven Bundesliga appearances for the club.

He returned to VfL Wolfsburg in the summer of 2004, but spent the first part of the 2004–05 season with the club's reserve squad in the third-division Regionalliga Nord, where he scored two goals in seven appearances. He returned to the first team in January 2005 and went on to make 11 Bundesliga appearances until the end of the season, scoring once as he netted the final goal in the club's 4–0 home victory over FC Hansa Rostock only a few seconds after entering the match as a substitute. In 3 1/2 seasons with VfL Wolfsburg's first team, he made 85 Bundesliga appearances and scored 31 goals for the club in the league. In July 2005, he transferred to Japanese club Urawa Red Diamonds, but spent only six months with the club and scored eight goals in 13 J1 League appearances for the team. He returned to Germany with the beginning of the year 2006 and signed a three-and-a-half-year contract with TSG Hoffenheim, a third-division Regionalliga Süd side with strong ambitions of being promoted to the 2. Bundesliga. In his first six months with the club, he scored nine goals in 15 Regionalliga Süd matches, but the team only finished fourth at the end of the 2005–06 season, two places below the promotion ranks.

== International career ==
Marić also had a short international career with the Croatia national team in 2002 and 2003. He made his international debut in Croatia's friendly match against Hungary on 8 May 2002 and scored his first international goal in Croatia's 1–0 away victory over Romania in a friendly match played on 20 November 2002. In the 2002–03 season, he also made five appearances for Croatia in the Euro 2004 qualifying and scored once as he netted the third goal in their 4–0 home victory over Belgium on 29 March 2003. His last international match was Croatia's Euro 2004 qualifier against Estonia on 11 June 2003. In all, he won nine international caps and scored two goals for Croatia.

== Managerial career ==
He was named assistant to manager Thomas Schneider at VfB Stuttgart in August 2013. He later was manager of Slovakia top-tier side DAC Dunajská Streda.

== Personal life ==
Marić's younger brother Marijo is also a professional footballer who formerly played in the Bundesliga, most notably for VfL Bochum, but also made a successful career with FC Kärnten in the Austrian Bundesliga and was an occasional member of the Croatia national team between 2002 and 2004 as well.

== Career statistics ==
=== Club ===
Appearances and goals by club, season and competition
Club	Season	League			National cup		League cup		Continental		Total	
Club	Season	Division	Apps	Goals	Apps	Goals	Apps	Goals	Apps	Goals	Apps	Goals
SpVgg 07 Ludwigsburg	1992–93		26	4			–				26	4
SpVgg 07 Ludwigsburg	1993–94		33	10			–				33	10
SpVgg 07 Ludwigsburg	Total		59	14			0	0			59	14
Karlsruher SC	1994–95	Bundesliga	4	0	0	0	–		0	0	4	0
SG Wattenscheid 09	1995–96	2. Bundesliga	31	7	2	0	–		–		33	7
Stuttgarter Kickers	1996–97	2. Bundesliga	20	6	1	0	–		–		21	6
Stuttgarter Kickers	1997–98	2. Bundesliga	33	7	2	1	0	0	–		35	8
Stuttgarter Kickers	1998–99	2. Bundesliga	26	8	0	0	0	0	–		26	8
Stuttgarter Kickers	1999–2000	2. Bundesliga	33	21	5	4	0	0	–		38	25
Stuttgarter Kickers	Total		112	42	8	5	0	0	0	0	120	47
VfL Wolfsburg	2000–01	Bundesliga	30	6	3	0	0	0	4	1	37	7
VfL Wolfsburg	2001–02	Bundesliga	17	12	3	1	0	0	0	0	20	13
VfL Wolfsburg	2002–03	Bundesliga	27	12	2	0	0	0	0	0	29	12
VfL Wolfsburg	2004–05	Bundesliga	11	1	0	0	0	0	0	0	11	1
VfL Wolfsburg	Total		85	31	8	1	0	0	4	1	97	33
VfL Wolfsburg II	2003–04		5	1	0	0	0	0	0	0	5	1
VfL Wolfsburg II	2004–05	Regionalliga Nord	7	2	0	0	0	0	0	0	7	2
VfL Wolfsburg II	Total		12	3	0	0	0	0	0	0	12	3
Borussia Mönchengladbach (loan)	2003–04	Bundesliga	7	1	2	1	0	0	0	0	9	2
Urawa Reds	2005	J1 League	13	8	5	6	3	0	–		21	14
TSG Hoffenheim	2005–06	Regionalliga	15	9	0	0	0	0	0	0	15	9
TSG Hoffenheim	2006–07	Regionalliga	32	8	0	0	0	0	0	0	32	8
TSG Hoffenheim	Total		47	17	0	0	0	0	0	0	47	17
Career total			370	123	25	13	3	0	4	1	402	137

=== International ===
Appearances and goals by national team and year
National team	Year	Apps	Goals
Croatia	2002	4	1
Croatia	2003	5	1
Total		9	2
