= Patrick Weiser =

German footballer (born 1971)

Personal information
- Date of birth: 25 December 1971 (age 54)
- Place of birth: Düren, West Germany
- Height: 1.81 m (5 ft 11 in)
- Positions: Midfielder; defender

Youth career
- Hertha Rheidt

Senior career*
Years	Team	Apps	(Gls)
1991–1997	1. FC Köln	110	(5)
1997–1999	Rennes	39	(3)
1999–2005	VfL Wolfsburg	159	(1)
2005–2007	1. FC Köln	3	(0)
Total		311	(9)

Managerial career
- –2009: VfL Meckenheim (youth)
- 2009–2011: 1. FC Köln (youth)
- 2011–2012: 1. FC Köln (assistant)
- 2012–2013: Wolverhampton Wanderers (assistant)
- 2014–2015: Bonner SC (U-19)
- 2016–2019: Bayer Leverkusen (U-17)
- 2019–2020: Bayer Leverkusen (U-19)
- 2026–: FSV Luckenwalde
- * Club domestic league appearances and goals

Patrick Weiser (born 25 December 1971) is a German former professional footballer who played both as a midfielder and as a defender. Since retiring from playing he has entered coaching.

== Club career ==
Weiser began his professional career with 1. FC Köln whom he had joined aged 13. He made his first team debut on 11 April 1992 in a 3–1 win at MSV Duisburg and became a regular player during the following season.

After making 110 appearances for 1. FC Köln over six seasons, he departed for France in July 1997, joining Rennes. He was a mainstay of their starting XI during his first Ligue 1 campaign, but the arrival of Paul Le Guen as manager saw his appearances during the 1998–99 season become more limited.

He returned to Germany to sign for VfL Wolfsburg and begin a six-year association with the club. He played 159 league games for the club during this period, and also featured in several UEFA Cup campaigns. During this time he switched to playing more predominantly as a defender than as midfielder.

In August 2005, Weiser returned to his former club 1. FC Köln, signing a two-year deal. He only made a handful of appearances for the club though during their campaign in the league, DFB Cup and Intertoto Cup.

== Managerial career ==
After retiring from playing he became a coach at under 16 level for 1. FC Köln in 2009, and later became assistant coach of the first team for the 2011–12 season.

In October 2012, he moved to the role of head coach at English club Wolverhampton Wanderers, where he reunited with Ståle Solbakken who he had previously been assistant to at 1. FC Köln. However, Weiser was sacked along with Solbakken in January 2013.

== Personal life ==
His son Mitchell (born 1994) is also a professional footballer.
