= 2008–09 VfL Wolfsburg season =

VfL Wolfsburg
2008–09 season
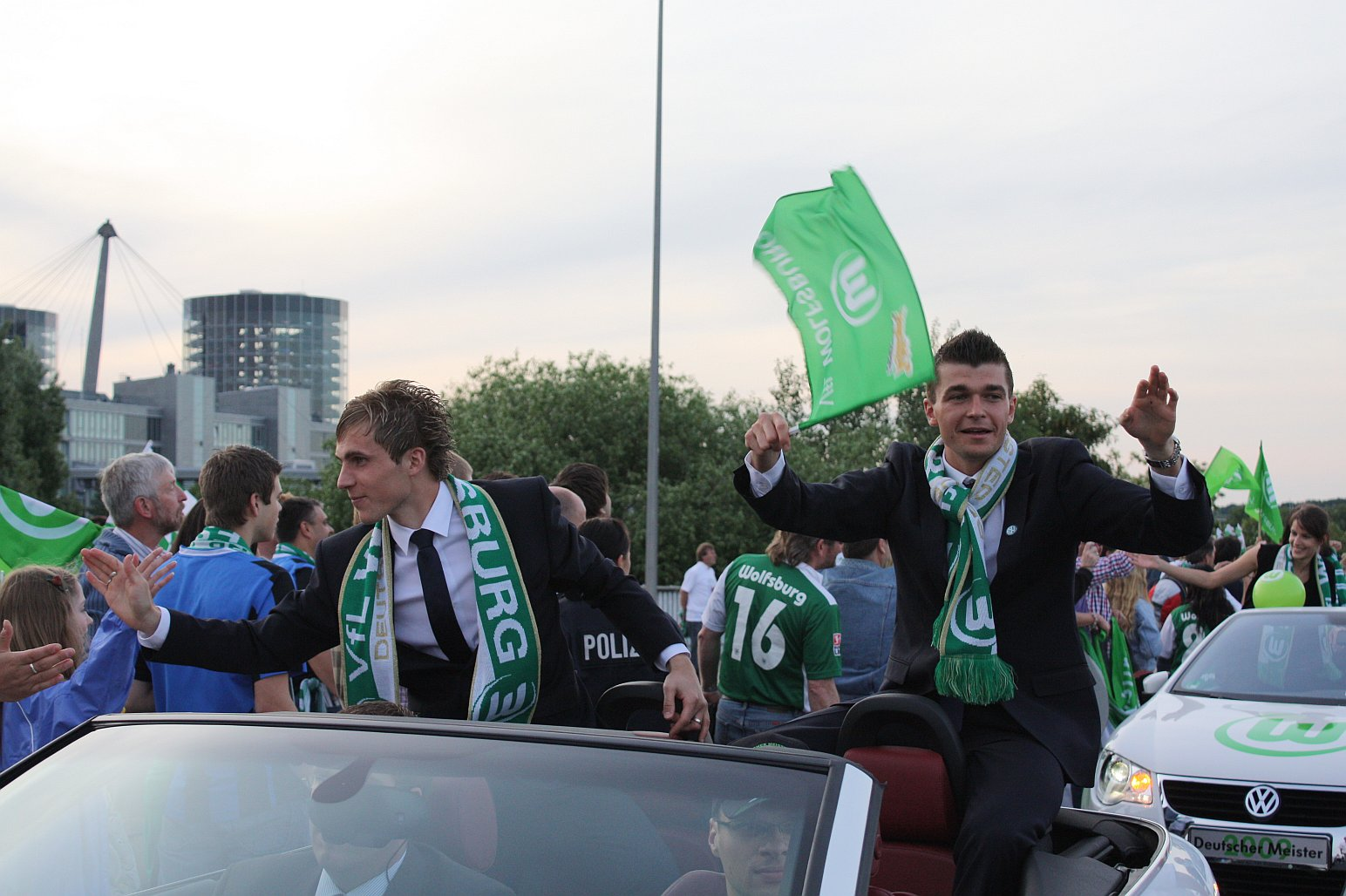
- André Lenz (left) and Jan Šimůnek (right) in the victory parade following Wolfsburg's title-winning season, 2009
- Manager: Felix Magath
- Bundesliga: 1st
- DFB-Pokal: Quarter-finals
- UEFA Cup: Round of 32
- Top goalscorer: League: Grafite (28); All: Edin Džeko (36)
Home colours	Away colours	Third colours

VfL Wolfsburg won their first ever Bundesliga title during this season. Manager Felix Magath formed an attacking lineup, which included strikers Edin Džeko and Grafite, the pair scoring 54 goals between them, much due to the help of attacking midfielder Zvjezdan Misimović's 20 assists.

== Players ==
=== First-team squad ===
Squad at end of season

Note: Flags indicate national team as defined under FIFA eligibility rules; some limited exceptions apply. Players may hold more than one non-FIFA nationality.

No.	Pos.	Nation	Player
1	GK	SUI	Diego Benaglio
2	DF	ITA	Cristian Zaccardo
3	DF	BRA	Rodrigo Alvim
4	DF	GER	Marcel Schäfer
5	DF	POR	Ricardo Costa
6	DF	CZE	Jan Šimůnek
7	MF	BRA	Josué (captain)
8	FW	JPN	Yoshito Ōkubo
9	FW	BIH	Edin Džeko
10	MF	BIH	Zvjezdan Misimović (Note: Misimović was born in Munich, West Germany (now Germany), but also qualified to represent Bosnia and Herzegovina, Yugoslavia, and its successor states internationally through his parents and represented Yugoslavia at U-19 and U-21 level before making his international debut for Bosnia and Herzegovina in February 2004.)
11	FW	BRA	Caiuby
12	GK	GER	André Lenz
13	MF	JPN	Makoto Hasebe
15	MF	GER	Daniel Adlung

No.	Pos.	Nation	Player
17	DF	GER	Alexander Madlung
19	DF	SVK	Peter Pekarík
20	DF	GER	Sascha Riether
21	GK	GER	Patrick Platins
22	DF	GER	Kevin Wolze
23	FW	BRA	Grafite
24	MF	IRI	Ashkan Dejagah (Note: Dejagah was born in Tehran, Iran, but was raised in Germany from the age of 1 and represented Germany at every youth level between U-17 and U-21 level. He was permitted to represent Iran internationally after a FIFA rule change in 2009 and made his international debut for Iran in February 2012.)
25	MF	GER	Christian Gentner
27	MF	GER	Alexander Esswein
32	MF	GER	Sebastian Schindzielorz (Note: Schindzielorz was born in Krapkowice, Poland, but also qualified to represent Germany internationally and represented them at U-21 and B level, and was also called up by the senior side without playing.)
33	DF	GER	Daniel Reiche
35	GK	SUI	Marwin Hitz
37	DF	KAZ	Sergei Karimov
43	DF	ITA	Andrea Barzagli

=== Left club during season ===
Note: Flags indicate national team as defined under FIFA eligibility rules; some limited exceptions apply. Players may hold more than one non-FIFA nationality.

No.	Pos.	Nation	Player
8	MF	GER	Daniel Baier (on loan to Augsburg)
14	MF	PAR	Jonathan Santana (Note: Santana was born in Buenos Aires, Argentina, but also qualified to represent Paraguay internationally through his mother and made his international debut for Paraguay in 2007.) (on loan to San Lorenzo)
16	FW	TUR	Mahir Sağlık (Note: Sağlık was born in Paderborn, West Germany (now Germany), but also qualified to represent Turkey internationally and represented them at every level between U-17 and U-20 level.) (on loan to Karlsruhe)
18	MF	POL	Jacek Krzynówek (to Hannover 96)

No.	Pos.	Nation	Player
19	MF	ROU	Vlad Munteanu (on loan to Arminia Bielefeld)
31	MF	GER	Alexander Laas (on loan to Arminia Bielefeld)
31	DF	GER	Bernd Korzynietz (on loan from Arminia Bielefeld)

== Competitions ==
=== Bundesliga ===
==== League table ====
Pos	Team	Pld	W	D	L	GF	GA	GD	Pts	Qualification or relegation
1	VfL Wolfsburg (C)	34	21	6	7	80	41	+39	69	Qualification to Champions League group stage
2	Bayern Munich	34	20	7	7	71	42	+29	67	Qualification to Champions League group stage
3	VfB Stuttgart	34	19	7	8	63	43	+20	64	Qualification to Champions League play-off round
4	Hertha BSC	34	19	6	9	48	41	+7	63	Qualification to Europa League play-off round
5	Hamburger SV	34	19	4	11	49	47	+2	61	Qualification to Europa League third qualifying round

Source: kicker (in German)
Rules for classification: 1) points; 2) goal difference; 3) number of goals scored.
(C) Champions

==== Matches ====
16 August 2008 1	VfL Wolfsburg	2–1	1. FC Köln	Wolfsburg
	Gentner 48'; Misimović 78'		Novaković 19'	Stadium: Volkswagen Arena

24 August 2008 2	VfL Bochum	2–2	VfL Wolfsburg	Bochum
	Šesták 12'; Dabrowski 50'		Costa 55'; Sağlık 69'	Stadium: rewirpowerSTADION

30 August 2008 3	VfL Wolfsburg	2–2	Eintracht Frankfurt	Wolfsburg
	Grafite 27' (pen.); Dejagah 51'		Amanatidis 22'; Toski 84'	Stadium: Volkswagen Arena

13 September 2008 4	Hertha BSC	2–2	VfL Wolfsburg	Berlin
	Kačar 57'; Cícero 85'		Costa 1'; Riether 90'	Stadium: Olympiastadion

21 September 2008 5	VfL Wolfsburg	3–0	Hamburger SV	Wolfsburg
	Dejagah 15'; Madlung 22'; Grafite 28'			Stadium: Volkswagen Arena

28 September 2008 6	Karlsruher SC	2–1	VfL Wolfsburg	Karlsruhe
	Porcello 51'; Freis 75'		Costa 78'	Stadium: Wildparkstadion

5 October 2008 7	Schalke 04	2–2	VfL Wolfsburg	Gelsenkirchen
	Kurányi 20', 90'		Džeko 51'; Caiuby 66'	Stadium: Veltins-Arena

18 October 2008 8	VfL Wolfsburg	4–1	Arminia Bielefeld	Wolfsburg
	Misimović 5', 34'; Madlung 54'; Grafite 64'		Laas 60'	Stadium: Volkswagen Arena

25 October 2008 9	Bayern Munich	4–2	VfL Wolfsburg	Munich
	Ribéry 41'; Van Bommel 54'; Borowski 63'; Schweinsteiger 80'		Grafite 31' (pen.); Džeko 33'	Stadium: Allianz Arena

28 October 2008 10	VfL Wolfsburg	3–0	Borussia Mönchengladbach	Wolfsburg
	Grafite 40' (pen.); Madlung 55'; Misimović 75' (pen.)			Stadium: Volkswagen Arena

31 October 2008 11	Bayer Leverkusen	2–0	VfL Wolfsburg	Leverkusen
	Barnetta 57'; Kießling 65'			Stadium: BayArena

8 November 2008 12	VfL Wolfsburg	3–0	Energie Cottbus	Wolfsburg
	Grafite 36' (pen.), 55', 80'			Stadium: Volkswagen Arena

15 November 2008 13	1899 Hoffenheim	3–2	VfL Wolfsburg	Hoffenheim
	Ibišević 22'; Carlos Eduardo 37'; Obasi 69'		Grafite 27'; Džeko 40'	Stadium: Rhein-Neckar Arena

22 November 2008 14	VfL Wolfsburg	4–1	VfB Stuttgart	Wolfsburg
	Grafite 51', 76'; Džeko 79', 90+5'		Lanig 17'	Stadium: Volkswagen Arena

30 November 2008 15	Borussia Dortmund	0–0	VfL Wolfsburg	Dortmund
				Stadium: Westfalenstadion

7 December 2008 16	VfL Wolfsburg	2–1	Hannover 96	Wolfsburg
	Zaccardo 32'; Štajner 62' (o.g.)		Štajner 59'	Stadium: Volkswagen Arena

13 December 2008 17	Werder Bremen	2–1	VfL Wolfsburg	Bremen
	Mertesacker 27'; Josué 63' (o.g.)		Gentner 3'	Stadium: Weserstadion

31 January 2009 18	1. FC Köln	1–1	VfL Wolfsburg	Cologne
	Radu 34'		Grafite 73'	Stadium: RheinEnergieStadion

7 February 2009 19	VfL Wolfsburg	2–0	VfL Bochum	Wolfsburg
	Džeko 21', 85'			Stadium: Volkswagen Arena

14 February 2009 20	Eintracht Frankfurt	0–2	VfL Wolfsburg	Frankfurt
			Džeko 9'; Misimović 66' (pen.)	Stadium: Commerzbank-Arena

21 February 2009 21	VfL Wolfsburg	2–1	Hertha BSC	Wolfsburg
	Džeko 71', 84'		Cícero 62'	Stadium: Volkswagen Arena

1 March 2009 22	Hamburger SV	1–3	VfL Wolfsburg	Hamburg
	Guerrero 73'		Grafite 12' (pen.), 25'; Džeko 75'	Stadium: HSH Nordbank Arena

7 March 2009 23	VfL Wolfsburg	1–0	Karlsruher SC	Wolfsburg
	Džeko 38'			Stadium: Volkswagen Arena

13 March 2009 24	VfL Wolfsburg	4–3	Schalke 04	Wolfsburg
	Grafite 25' (pen.), 74', 84'; Džeko 44'		Westermann 9'; Jones 76'; Kurányi 90'	Stadium: Volkswagen Arena

21 March 2009 25	Arminia Bielefeld	0–3	VfL Wolfsburg	Bielefeld
			Gentner 19'; Grafite 58'; Dejagah 87'	Stadium: Bielefelder Alm

4 April 2009 26	VfL Wolfsburg	5–1	Bayern Munich	Wolfsburg
	Gentner 44'; Džeko 63', 66'; Grafite 74', 77'		Toni 45'	Stadium: Volkswagen Arena

11 April 2009 27	Borussia Mönchengladbach	1–2	VfL Wolfsburg	Mönchengladbach
	Dante 79'		Džeko 20'; Riether 85'	Stadium: Borussia-Park

18 April 2009 28	VfL Wolfsburg	2–1	Bayer Leverkusen	Wolfsburg
	Grafite 23' (pen.), 85'		Kroos 54'	Stadium: Volkswagen Arena

26 April 2009 29	Energie Cottbus	2–0	VfL Wolfsburg	Cottbus
	Rangelov 72'; Skela 86'			Stadium: Stadion der Freundschaft

2 May 2009 30	VfL Wolfsburg	4–0	1899 Hoffenheim	Wolfsburg
	Džeko 66', 74', 78'; Grafite 89' (pen.)			Stadium: Volkswagen Arena

9 May 2009 31	VfB Stuttgart	4–1	VfL Wolfsburg	Stuttgart
	Gómez 1', 20', 63', 77'		Džeko 36'	Stadium: Mercedes-Benz Arena

12 May 2009 32	VfL Wolfsburg	3–0	Borussia Dortmund	Wolfsburg
	Džeko 15', 85'; Grafite 47'			Stadium: Volkswagen Arena

16 May 2009 33	Hannover 96	0–5	VfL Wolfsburg	Hanover
			Džeko 14', 54', 79'; Grafite 33', 36'	Attendance: AWD-Arena

23 May 2009 34	VfL Wolfsburg	5–1	Werder Bremen	Wolfsburg
	Misimović 6'; Grafite 15', 56'; Prödl 26' (o.g.); Džeko 74'		Diego 31'	Stadium: Volkswagen Arena

=== DFB-Pokal ===
10 August 2008 First round	1. FC Heidenheim 1846	0–3	VfL Wolfsburg	Heidenheim
14:30 CEST			Grafite 54'; Sağlık 57', 75'	Stadium: Albstadion; Attendance: 7,500; Referee: Thomas Metzen (Mechernich)

24 September 2008 Second round	FC Oberneuland	0–7	VfL Wolfsburg	Bremen
19:00 CEST			Džeko 15', 20', 57', 75'; Schäfer 26'; Dejagah 67'; Caiuby 89'	Stadium: Weserstadion Platz 11; Attendance: 2,196; Referee: Guido Winkmann (Kerken)

28 January 2009 Third round	VfL Wolfsburg	5–1	Hansa Rostock	Wolfsburg
20:30 CET	Grafite 58', 86' (pen.), 90'; Bülow 66' (o.g.); Gentner 79'		Fillinger 68'	Stadium: Volkswagen Arena; Attendance: 12,500; Referee: Jochen Drees (Münster-Sarmsheim)

4 March 2009 Quarter-finals	VfL Wolfsburg	2–5	Werder Bremen	Wolfsburg
19:00 CET	Džeko 10', 42'		Diego 3', 55' (pen.); Özil 6'; Pizarro 71', 89'	Stadium: Volkswagen Arena; Attendance: 24,115; Referee: Thorsten Kinhöfer (Herne)

=== UEFA Cup ===
==== First round ====
18 September 2008 First leg	VfL Wolfsburg (Germany)	1–0	(Romania) Rapid București	Wolfsburg
19:00 CET	Grafite 47' (pen.)			Stadium: Volkswagen Arena; Referee: Gianluca Rocchi (Italy)

2 October 2008 Second leg	Rapid București (Romania)	1–1	(Germany) VfL Wolfsburg	Bucharest
16:00 CET	Maftei 70'		Grafite 15'	Stadium: Stadionul Giuleşti-Valentin Stănescu; Referee: Paul Allaerts (Belgium)

==== Group stage ====
Pos	Team	Pld	W	D	L	GF	GA	GD	Pts	Qualification	WOL	ACM	BRA	POR	HVN
1	(Germany) VfL Wolfsburg	4	3	1	0	13	7	+6	10	Advance to knockout stage	—	—	—	3–2	5–1
2	(Italy) Milan	4	2	2	0	8	5	+3	8	Advance to knockout stage	2–2	—	1–0	—	—
3	(Portugal) Braga	4	2	0	2	7	5	+2	6	Advance to knockout stage	2–3	—	—	3–0	—
4	(England) Portsmouth	4	1	1	2	7	8	−1	4		—	2–2	—	—	3–0
5	(Netherlands) Heerenveen	4	0	0	4	3	13	−10	0		—	1–3	1–2	—	—

Source: RSSSF

6 November 2008 1	VfL Wolfsburg (Germany)	5–1	(Netherlands) Heerenveen	Wolfsburg
19:45 UTC+1	Džeko 34', 61'; Grafite 39'; Misimović 53'; Krzynówek 71'		Väyrynen 31'	Stadium: Volkswagen Arena; Attendance: 15,615; Referee: Jonas Eriksson (Sweden)

27 November 2008 2	Braga (Portugal)	2–3	(Germany) VfL Wolfsburg	Braga
21:30 UTC+0	Barzagli 6' (o.g.); Meyong 49'		Džeko 24'; Misimović 83' (pen.), 90+4'	Stadium: Estádio AXA; Attendance: 7,294; Referee: Anton Genov (Bulgaria)

4 December 2008 3	VfL Wolfsburg (Germany)	3–2	(England) Portsmouth	Wolfsburg
20:45 UTC+1	Džeko 3'; Gentner 23'; Misimović 74'		Defoe 11'; Mvuemba 14'	Stadium: Volkswagen Arena; Attendance: 21,015; Referee: Ivan Bebek (Croatia)

17 December 2008 4	Milan (Italy)	2–2	(Germany) VfL Wolfsburg	Milan
20:45 UTC+1	Ambrosini 17'; Pato 56'		Zaccardo 56'; Sağlık 81'	Stadium: San Siro; Attendance: 5,420; Referee: Mark Courtney (Northern Ireland)

==== Round of 32 ====
18 February 2009 First leg	Paris Saint-Germain (France)	2–0	(Germany) VfL Wolfsburg	Paris
20:45	Hoarau 80', 83'			Stadium: Parc des Princes; Attendance: 27,447; Referee: Svein Oddvar Moen (Norway)

26 February 2009 Second leg	VfL Wolfsburg (Germany)	1–3	(France) Paris Saint-Germain	Wolfsburg
19:00 CET	Hasebe 63'		Luyindula 38' (pen.), 73'; Rothen 60'	Stadium: Volkswagen Arena; Referee: Vladimír Hriňák (Slovakia)

== Statistics ==
=== Top scorers ===
==== Bundesliga ====
- (Brazil) Grafite (28)
- (Bosnia and Herzegovina) Edin Džeko (26)
- (Bosnia and Herzegovina) Zvjezdan Misimović (7)

==== DFB-Pokal ====
- (Bosnia and Herzegovina) Edin Džeko (6)
- (Brazil) Grafite (4)

== Sources ==
Soccerbase - Wolfsburg Results
