= 2009–10 VfL Wolfsburg season =

VfL Wolfsburg
2009–10 season
- Manager: Armin Veh; Lorenz-Günther Köstner
- Bundesliga: 8th
- DFB-Pokal: Quarter-finals
- UEFA Champions League: Group stage
- UEFA Europa League: Quarter-finals
- Top goalscorer: League: Edin Džeko (22); All: Edin Džeko (29)
Home colours	Away colours	Third colours

VfL Wolfsburg did not manage to qualify for international football, in spite of keeping the squad that won the Bundesliga in 2009. Coach Armin Veh was sacked, following a failure to reach the knockout stage of the UEFA Champions League, and being distanced in Bundesliga. Under interim coach Lorenz-Günther Köstner Wolfsburg managed to finish inside the top half and reach the quarter-final in the UEFA Europa League. The most influential player was Edin Džeko, who unlike the team, continued to perform at the top level, topping the Bundesliga's top scoring-chart.

== Squad ==
=== Goalkeepers ===
- (Switzerland) (Italy) Diego Benaglio
- (Germany) André Lenz
- (Switzerland) Marwin Hitz

=== Defenders ===
- (Italy) Andrea Barzagli
- (Germany) Alexander Madlung
- (Portugal) Ricardo Costa
- (Germany) Marcel Schäfer
- (Italy) Cristian Zaccardo
- (Slovakia) Peter Pekarík
- (Brazil) Réver
- (Germany) Fabian Johnson
- (Germany) Daniel Reiche
- (Czech Republic) Jan Šimůnek

=== Midfielders ===
- (Germany) Sascha Riether
- (Germany) Christian Gentner
- (Bosnia and Herzegovina) Zvjezdan Misimović
- (Germany) Ashkan Dejagah
- (Japan) Makoto Hasebe
- (Brazil) Josué
- (Paraguay) Jonathan Santana
- (Algeria) (France) Karim Ziani
- (Germany) Sebastian Schindzielorz
- (Germany) Alexander Laas
- (Germany) Daniel Baier

=== Attackers ===
- (Brazil) Grafite
- (Bosnia and Herzegovina) Edin Džeko
- (Nigeria) (Italy) Obafemi Martins
- (Germany) Alexander Esswein

== Competitions ==
=== Bundesliga ===
==== League table ====
Pos	Team	Pld	W	D	L	GF	GA	GD	Pts	Qualification or relegation
6	VfB Stuttgart	34	15	10	9	51	41	+10	55	Qualification to Europa League third qualifying round (Note: Since both finalists of the 2009–10 DFB-Pokal were qualified for the 2010–11 UEFA Champions League, the 6th-placed team will qualify for the 3rd qualifying round of the 2010–11 UEFA Europa League.)
7	Hamburger SV	34	13	13	8	56	41	+15	52	
8	VfL Wolfsburg	34	14	8	12	64	58	+6	50	
9	Mainz 05	34	12	11	11	36	42	−6	47	
10	Eintracht Frankfurt	34	12	10	12	47	54	−7	46	

Source: kicker.de (in German)
Rules for classification: 1) points; 2) goal difference; 3) number of goals scored.

==== Matches ====
1	VfL Wolfsburg	2 – 0	VfB Stuttgart
	Misimović 71'; Grafite 82'

2	1. FC Köln	1 – 3	VfL Wolfsburg
	Ehret 49'		Džeko 73'; Womé 74' (o.g.); Martins 86'

3	VfL Wolfsburg	2 – 4	Hamburger SV
	Misimović 52'; Martins 56'		Guerrero 3'; Elia 7'; Petrić 75'; Castelen 90'

4	Bayern Munich	3 – 0	VfL Wolfsburg
	Gómez 26'; Robben 68', 80'

5	VfL Wolfsburg	2 – 3	Bayer Leverkusen
	Misimović 76'; Grafite 80' (pen.)		Rolfes 38', 51' (pen.); Kießling 58'

6	Schalke 04	1 – 2	VfL Wolfsburg
	Höwedes 80'		Džeko 55', 81'

7	VfL Wolfsburg	4 – 2	Hannover 96
	Misimović 8'; Gentner 45'; Hasebe 48'; Džeko 62'		Balitsch 28'; Madlung 50' (o.g.)

8	VfL Bochum	1 – 1	VfL Wolfsburg
	Hashemian 53'		Martins 75'

9	VfL Wolfsburg	2 – 1	Borussia Mönchengladbach
	Madlung 45'; Gentner 90'		Bradley 90'

10	Hertha BSC	0 – 0	VfL Wolfsburg

11	VfL Wolfsburg	3 – 3	Mainz 05
	Martins 7', 20'; Misimović 64'		Amri 35'; Ivanschitz 41'; Hoogland 85'

12	1899 Hoffenheim	1 – 2	VfL Wolfsburg
	Ibišević 23'		Misimović 52'; Grafite 57'

13	VfL Wolfsburg	2 – 3	1. FC Nürnberg
	Dejagah 59'; Grafite 79' (pen.)		Bunjaku 56', 64'; Kluge 90'

14	Werder Bremen	2 – 2	VfL Wolfsburg
	Almeida 62'; Mertesacker 90'		Džeko 42', 85'

15	VfL Wolfsburg	2 – 2	SC Freiburg
	Bastians 27' (o.g.); Johnson 81'		Idrissou 19'; Banović 51' (pen.)

16	VfL Wolfsburg	1 – 3	Borussia Dortmund
	Grafite 55'		Barrios 8', 10'; Owomoyela 36'

17	Eintracht Frankfurt	2 – 2	VfL Wolfsburg
	Franz 26'; Meier 79'		Džeko 37'; Josué 69'

18	VfB Stuttgart	3 – 1	VfL Wolfsburg
	Hilbert 28'; Pogrebnyak 58'; Gebhart 87'		Džeko 65'

19	VfL Wolfsburg	2 – 3	1. FC Köln
	Gentner 22'; Costa 59'		Pezzoni 7'; Freis 57'; Chihi 74'

20	Hamburger SV	1 – 1	VfL Wolfsburg
	Trochowski 90'		Džeko 34'

21	VfL Wolfsburg	1 – 3	Bayern Munich
	Grafite 90'		Robben 2'; Van Buyten 26'; Ribéry 57'

22	Bayer Leverkusen	2 – 1	VfL Wolfsburg
	Reinartz 48'; Derdiyok 68'		Džeko 79'

23	VfL Wolfsburg	2 – 1	Schalke 04
	Grafite 71', 77'		Kurányi 30'

24	Hannover 96	0 – 1	VfL Wolfsburg
			Misimović 78'

25	VfL Wolfsburg	4 – 1	VfL Bochum
	Džeko 60', 79' (pen.); Martins 75'; Santana 90'		Freier 28'

26	Borussia Mönchengladbach	0 – 4	VfL Wolfsburg
			Misimović 41'; Džeko 49' (pen.), 80'; Gentner 58'

27	VfL Wolfsburg	1 – 5	Hertha BSC
	Grafite 36'		Gekas 6', 26', 83'; Ramos 8', 84'

28	Mainz 05	0 – 2	VfL Wolfsburg
			Džeko 83', 90'

29	VfL Wolfsburg	4 – 0	1899 Hoffenheim
	Džeko 25', 75'; Barzagli 51'; Misimović 74'

30	1. FC Nürnberg	0 – 2	VfL Wolfsburg
			Džeko 66'; Grafite 78'

31	VfL Wolfsburg	2 – 4	Werder Bremen
	Džeko 18'; Grafite 40'		Frings 38' (pen.), 62'; Pizarro 49'; Almeida 75'

32	SC Freiburg	1 – 0	VfL Wolfsburg
	Makiadi 38'

33	Borussia Dortmund	1 – 1	VfL Wolfsburg
	Stiepermann 81'		Džeko 69'

34	VfL Wolfsburg	3 – 1	Eintracht Frankfurt
	Misimović 21'; Riether 31'; Džeko 34'		Halil Altıntop 86'

==== Top scorers ====
- (Bosnia and Herzegovina) Edin Džeko (22)
- (Brazil) Grafite (11)
- (Bosnia and Herzegovina) Zvjezdan Misimović (10)
- (Nigeria) Obafemi Martins (6)

==== Top assists ====
- (Bosnia and Herzegovina) Zvjezdan Misimović (15)
- (Bosnia and Herzegovina) Edin Džeko (10)

=== DFB-Pokal ===
31 July 2009 Round 1	Wehen Wiesbaden	1–4	VfL Wolfsburg	Wiesbaden
20:30 UTC+2	Bohl 62'		Grafite 25'; Misimović 41', 56'; Džeko 51'	Stadium: BRITA-Arena; Attendance: 7,433; Referee: Deniz Aytekin (Oberasbach)

23 September 2009 Round 2	1. FC Köln	3–2	VfL Wolfsburg	Cologne
20:30 UTC+2	Ishiaku 22', 32'; Freis 65'		Džeko 54'; Riether 66'	Stadium: RheinEnergieStadion; Attendance: 31,500; Referee: Wolfgang Stark (Ergolding)

=== UEFA Champions League ===
==== Group stage ====
Group B
Team	Pld	W	D	L	GF	GA	GD	Pts
(England) Manchester United	6	4	1	1	10	6	+4	13
(Russia) CSKA Moscow	6	3	1	2	10	10	0	10
(Germany) VfL Wolfsburg	6	2	1	3	9	8	+1	7
(Turkey) Beşiktaş	6	1	1	4	3	8	−5	4

15 September 2009 1	VfL Wolfsburg (Germany)	3 – 1	(Russia) CSKA Moscow	Wolfsburg, Germany
20:45	Grafite 36', 41' (pen.), 87'	Report	Rahimić (yellow card) 34'; Dzagoev 76'	Stadium: Volkswagen Arena; Attendance: 25,017; Referee: Stéphane Lannoy (France)

30 September 2009 2	Manchester United (England)	2 – 1	(Germany) VfL Wolfsburg	Manchester, England
20:45	Vidić (yellow card) 39'; Giggs 59'; Carrick 78'	Report	Džeko 56'; Costa (yellow card) 61'	Stadium: Old Trafford; Attendance: 74,037; Referee: Viktor Kassai (Hungary)

21 October 2009 3	VfL Wolfsburg (Germany)	0 – 0	(Turkey) Beşiktaş	Wolfsburg, Germany
20:45	Grafite (red card) 74'	Report	Üzülmez (yellow card) 17'	Stadium: Volkswagen Arena; Attendance: 25,778; Referee: Roberto Rosetti (Italy)

3 November 2009 4	Beşiktaş (Turkey)	0 – 3	(Germany) VfL Wolfsburg	Istanbul, Turkey
20:45	Kaş (yellow card) 36'; Tello (yellow card) 49'; İnceman (yellow card) 59'; Sivok (yellow card) 90'	Report	Misimović 14', (yellow card) 43'; Gentner 80'; Džeko 87'	Stadium: BJK İnönü Stadium; Attendance: 18,116; Referee: Alberto Undiano Mallenco (Spain)

25 November 2009 5	CSKA Moscow (Russia)	2 – 1	(Germany) VfL Wolfsburg	Moscow, Russia
18:30	Necid 58'; Krasić 66'	Report	Džeko 19'; Madlung (yellow card) 87'	Stadium: Luzhniki Stadium; Attendance: 13,478; Referee: Nicola Rizzoli (Italy)

8 December 2009 6	VfL Wolfsburg (Germany)	1 – 3	(England) Manchester United	Wolfsburg, Germany
20:45	Džeko 56'	Report	Owen 44', 83', 90+1'	Stadium: Volkswagen Arena; Attendance: 26,490; Referee: Björn Kuipers (Netherlands)

=== UEFA Europa League ===
==== Knockout phase ====
===== Round of 32 =====
18 February 2010 First leg	Villarreal (Spain)	2 – 2	(Germany) VfL Wolfsburg	Villarreal, Spain
19:00	Senna 43'; Ruben 85'	Report	Grafite 65', 84' (pen.)	Stadium: Estadio El Madrigal; Attendance: 22,000; Referee: Kevin Blom (Netherlands)

25 February 2010 Second leg	VfL Wolfsburg (Germany)	4 – 1	(Spain) Villarreal	Wolfsburg, Germany
21:05	Džeko 10'; Ángel 15' (o.g.); Gentner 42'; Grafite 64'	Report	Capdevila 30'	Stadium: Volkswagen Arena; Attendance: 17,000; Referee: Alexandru Tudor (Romania)

== Kits ==
Home	Away	Away Special	Third	Third Alternate

Type	Shirt	Shorts	Socks	First appearance / Info
Home	White	White	White	
Away	Green	Green	Green	
Away Special	Blue	Blue	Blue	Bundesliga, Match 32, April 25 against SC Freiburg
Third	Yellow	Black	Black	
Third Alt.	Yellow	Black	White	Bundesliga, Match 17, December 19 against Eintracht Frankfurt

== Sources ==
Soccerbase - Wolfsburg Results
