= 2006–07 VfL Wolfsburg season =

VfL Wolfsburg
2006–07 season
- Manager: Klaus Augenthaler
- Bundesliga: 15th
- DFB-Pokal: Semi-final
- Top goalscorer: Mike Hanke (8)
Home colours	Away colours	Third colours

VfL Wolfsburg only just saved the contract to stay in Bundesliga, for the second year running. In sharp contrast to the miserable league season, Wolfsburg reached the semi-finals of the DFB-Pokal, where they went out in a narrow defeat to eventual league champions Stuttgart.

== Players ==
=== First-team squad ===
Note: Flags indicate national team as defined under FIFA eligibility rules; some limited exceptions apply. Players may hold more than one non-FIFA nationality.

No.	Pos.	Nation	Player
1	GK	GER	Simon Jentzsch
2	DF	ARG	Facundo Quiroga
3	DF	BEL	Peter Van der Heyden
4	DF	GER	Alexander Madlung
5	DF	NED	Kevin Hofland
6	MF	NED	Tommie van der Leegte
7	FW	ARG	Juan Carlos Menseguez
8	MF	BUL	Marian Hristov
9	FW	ARG	Diego Klimowicz
10	MF	POL	Jacek Krzynówek
11	FW	GER	Mike Hanke
12	GK	GER	André Lenz
13	FW	GHA	Isaac Boakye
14	MF	PAR	Jonathan Santana (Note: Santana was born in Buenos Aires, Argentina, but also qualified to represent Paraguay internationally through his mother and made his international debut for Paraguay in 2007.)
15	DF	GHA	Hans Sarpei

No.	Pos.	Nation	Player
16	DF	GER	Uwe Möhrle
17	DF	GER	Christopher Lamprecht
18	MF	COD	Cédric Makiadi
20	MF	SVK	Miroslav Karhan
21	GK	GER	Patrick Platins (on loan to Augsburg)
22	MF	POR	Alex
23	DF	GER	Michael Stegmayer
24	DF	GER	Steve Müller
26	MF	GER	Sergej Evljuskin (Note: Evljuskin was born in Alekseyevka, Kirghizia, Soviet Union (now Kyrgyzstan) but was raised in Germany from the age of 2 and represented Germany at every youth level between U-16 and U-20 level before being called up by Kyrgyzstan in 2015.)
27	MF	GUI	Pablo Thiam
28	FW	USA	Kamani Hill
30	MF	SRB	Valdet Rama (Note: Rama was born in Mitrovica, Yugoslavia (now Kosovo, but part of Serbia during the 2006–07 season), but also qualified to represent Albania internationally and made his international debut for Albania in March 2013. He would later declare internationally for Kosovo but has not represented them as of 2020.)
31	MF	GER	Emre Öztürk
32	MF	BRA	Marcelinho Paraíba
33	MF	PAR	Julio dos Santos (on loan from Bayern Munich)

=== Left club during season ===
Note: Flags indicate national team as defined under FIFA eligibility rules; some limited exceptions apply. Players may hold more than one non-FIFA nationality.

No.	Pos.	Nation	Player
19	FW	NED	Rick Hoogendorp (on loan to ADO Den Haag)
25	MF	GER	Karsten Fischer (on loan to SC Paderborn)

No.	Pos.	Nation	Player
32	FW	BRA	Abuda (to Germinal Beerschot)

== Results ==
=== Bundesliga ===
1	VfL Wolfsburg	0–0	Hertha Berlin

2	Eintracht Frankfurt	0–0	VfL Wolfsburg

3	Bayer Leverkusen	1–1	VfL Wolfsburg
	Juan 49'		Madlung 70'

4	VfL Wolfsburg	1–2	Hannover 96
	Krzynówek 52'		Brdarić 50', 61'

5	Schalke 04	2–0	VfL Wolfsburg
	Kurányi 56'; Lincoln 88'

6	VfL Wolfsburg	1–0	Bayern Munich
	Hanke 35'

7	Mönchengladbach	3–1	VfL Wolfsburg
	Kluge 35'; Neuville 37'; Degen 84'		Madlung 17'

8	VfL Wolfsburg	1–1	VfB Stuttgart
	Hanke 26'		Gómez 30'

9	VfL Bochum	0–1	VfL Wolfsburg
			Hanke 25'

10	VfL Wolfsburg	1–0	Hamburg
	Hanke 19'

11	1. FSV Mainz 05	1–2	VfL Wolfsburg
	Szabics 7'		Hanke 5'; Lamprecht 84'

12	VfL Wolfsburg	0–0	Energie Cottbus

13	Arminia Bielefeld	0–0	VfL Wolfsburg

14	VfL Wolfsburg	1–1	1. FC Nürnberg
	Menseguez 84'		Saenko 7'

15	Borussia Dortmund	1–0	VfL Wolfsburg
	Smolarek 90'

16	VfL Wolfsburg	1–2	Alemannia Aachen
	Madlung 50'		Reghecampf 72'; Herzig 78'

17	Werder Bremen	2–1	VfL Wolfsburg
	D. Jensen 17'; Naldo 86'		Boakye 41'

18	Hertha Berlin	2–1	VfL Wolfsburg
	Giménez 27'; Pantelić 86' (pen.)		Madlung 18'

19	VfL Wolfsburg	2–2	Eintracht Frankfurt
	Klimowicz 9'; Hanke 72'		Thurk 63'; Meier 69'

20	VfL Wolfsburg	3–2	Bayer Leverkusen
	Hanke 17', 37'; Klimowicz 72'		Kießling 30'; Hofland 71' (o.g.)

21	Hannover 96	2–2	VfL Wolfsburg
	Balitsch 22'; Fahrenhorst 62'		Klimowicz 3'; Krzynówek 26'

22	VfL Wolfsburg	2–2	Schalke 04
	Klimowicz 56', 89'		Kurányi 11', 29'

23	Bayern Munich	2–1	VfL Wolfsburg
	Podolski 26' (pen.) van Bommel 55'		Makiadi 79'

24	VfL Wolfsburg	1–0	Mönchengladbach
	Makiadi 65'

25	VfB Stuttgart	0–0	VfL Wolfsburg

26	VfL Wolfsburg	3–1	VfL Bochum
	Boakye 22'; Madlung 26'; Marcelinho 83'		Gekas 66'

27	Hamburg	1–0	VfL Wolfsburg
	Mahdavikia 60'

28	VfL Wolfsburg	3–2	1. FSV Mainz 05
	Klimowicz 41'; Marcelinho 81', 87'		Zidan 21' (pen.), 79'

29	Energie Cottbus	3–2	VfL Wolfsburg
	Radu 20'; Munteanu 56'; Kioyo 57'		Boakye 65'; Makiadi 90'

30	VfL Wolfsburg	2–3	Arminia Bielefeld
	Marcelinho 16'; Boakye 53'		Westermann 8'; Eigler 71'; Wichniarek 86'

31	1. FC Nürnberg	1–1	VfL Wolfsburg
	Wolf 23'		Krzynówek 18'

32	VfL Wolfsburg	0–2	Borussia Dortmund
			Smolarek 12'; Valdez 90'

33	Alemannia Aachen	2–2	VfL Wolfsburg
	Lehmann 65' (pen.); Németh 68'		Lamprecht 81'; Klimowicz 85'

34	VfL Wolfsburg	0–2	Werder Bremen
			Rosenberg 54', 87'

=== Top Scorers ===
- (Germany) Mike Hanke 8
- (Argentina) Diego Klimowicz 7
- (Germany) Alexander Madlung 5
- (Brazil) Marcelinho 4

== Sources ==
BetExplorer - German Bundesliga Results
