= 2005–06 VfL Wolfsburg season =

VfL Wolfsburg
2005–06 season
- Manager: Holger Fach (until 19 December); Klaus Augenthaler (from 28 December)
- Bundesliga: 15th
- DFB-Pokal: Second round
- Top goalscorer: Diego Klimowicz (12)
Home colours	Away colours	Third colours

VfL Wolfsburg's Volkswagen-funded attack on the established Bundesliga top teams nearly ended in tears, with the side only staying up due to a draw in a directly decisive fixture at home to Kaiserslautern. Cédric Makiadi and Diego Klimowicz turned a 0–1 deficit around within just minutes during the second half, before an equaliser from Marcel Ziemer five minutes from time made for a nervy conclusion. But with no further goals scored, Wolfsburg just stayed up following a nightmare season.

== Players ==
=== First-team squad ===
Squad at end of season

Note: Flags indicate national team as defined under FIFA eligibility rules; some limited exceptions apply. Players may hold more than one non-FIFA nationality.

No.	Pos.	Nation	Player
1	GK	GER	Simon Jentzsch
3	DF	BEL	Peter Van der Heyden
4	DF	GER	Matthias Langkamp
5	DF	GER	Stefan Schnoor
6	MF	GUI	Pablo Thiam
8	MF	BUL	Marian Hristov
9	FW	ARG	Diego Klimowicz
11	FW	GER	Mike Hanke
14	MF	NED	Tommie van der Leegte
15	MF	COD	Cédric Makiadi
16	FW	BRA	Abuda
17	MF	GEO	Levan Tskitishvili
18	DF	ARG	Facundo Quiroga

No.	Pos.	Nation	Player
19	MF	POR	Alex
20	FW	NED	Rick Hoogendorp
21	FW	FRA	Steve Marlet
22	DF	SCG	Bojan Neziri (on loan from Metalurh Donetsk)
26	MF	GER	Karsten Fischer
27	MF	SVK	Miroslav Karhan
29	DF	NED	Kevin Hofland
30	GK	GER	André Lenz
31	DF	GHA	Hans Sarpei
32	DF	GER	Christopher Lamprecht
33	DF	GER	Maik Franz
36	FW	ARG	Juan Carlos Menseguez
40	GK	GER	Patrick Platins

=== Left club during season ===
Note: Flags indicate national team as defined under FIFA eligibility rules; some limited exceptions apply. Players may hold more than one non-FIFA nationality.

No.	Pos.	Nation	Player
7	MF	GER	Patrick Weiser (to Köln)
10	MF	ARG	Andrés D'Alessandro (on loan to Portsmouth)

No.	Pos.	Nation	Player
20	MF	BIH	Mirko Hrgović (to Hajduk Split)

== Results ==
=== Bundesliga ===
1	VfL Wolfsburg	2–2	Borussia Dortmund
	Klimowicz 9'; Hofland 82'		Smolarek 55'; Koller 81'

2	Mönchengladbach	1–1	VfL Wolfsburg
	Bøgelund 90'		Hanke 41'

3	VfL Wolfsburg	2–1	Bayer Leverkusen
	D'Alessandro 39'; Thiam 54'		Berbatov 22'

4	Hertha Berlin	3–0	VfL Wolfsburg
	Friedrich 69'; Pantelić 75'; Gilberto 90'

5	VfL Wolfsburg	1–1	1. FC Nürnberg
	Klimowicz 15'		Schroth 88'

6	Hannover 96	2–4	VfL Wolfsburg
	Brdarić 30', 89'		Hanke 10', 14'; Klimowicz 27'; D'Alessandro 33'

7	VfL Wolfsburg	1–0	Eintracht Frankfurt
	Klimowicz 35'

8	Bayern Munich	2–0	VfL Wolfsburg
	Santa Cruz 67'; Lúcio 90'

9	Hamburg	0–1	VfL Wolfsburg
			Klimowicz 19'

10	VfL Wolfsburg	0–0	Schalke 04

11	Duisburg	1–0	VfL Wolfsburg
	Bugera 57'

12	VfL Wolfsburg	1–1	1. FC Köln
	Klimowicz 41'		Epstein 88'

13	Werder Bremen	6–1	VfL Wolfsburg
	Baumann 6'; Borowski 43', 52'; Klose 60', 85'; Naldo 72'		Klimowicz 57'

14	VfL Wolfsburg	0–0	Arminia Bielefeld

15	1. FSV Mainz 05	5–1	VfL Wolfsburg
	Thurk 2' (pen.), 77'; Auer 36'; Ruman 45'; Zidan 51'		Klimowicz 3'

16	VfL Wolfsburg	0–1	VfB Stuttgart
			Meißner 62'

17	1. FC Kaiserslautern	3–2	VfL Wolfsburg
	Halil Altıntop 45', 61', 83'		Klimowicz 47'; Hanke 54'

18	Borussia Dortmund	3–2	VfL Wolfsburg
	Wörns 25'; Smolarek 31'; Gambino 67'		Hanke 13'; Klimowicz 71'

19	VfL Wolfsburg	2–0	Mönchengladbach
	Klimowicz 42'; Hanke 64'

20	Bayer Leverkusen	4–0	VfL Wolfsburg
	Berbatov 44'; Barnetta 55'; Schneider 71'; Madouni 75'

21	VfL Wolfsburg	1–1	Hertha Berlin
	Hofland 63'		Marcelinho 32' (pen.)

22	1. FC Nürnberg	1–0	VfL Wolfsburg
	Saenko 16'

23	VfL Wolfsburg	2–1	Hannover 96
	Hanke 9'; Menseguez 86'		Brdarić 17'

24	Eintracht Frankfurt	1–1	VfL Wolfsburg
	Amanatidis 65'		Hanke 58'

25	VfL Wolfsburg	0–0	Bayern Munich

26	VfL Wolfsburg	0–1	Hamburg
			Lauth 21'

27	Schalke 04	2–2	VfL Wolfsburg
	Kurányi 7'; Lincoln 67'		Hoogendorp 29'; Lamprecht 76'

28	VfL Wolfsburg	1–1	Duisburg
	Marlet 90'		van Houdt 72'

29	1. FC Köln	3–0	VfL Wolfsburg
	Scherz 77'; Helmes 78'; Sarpei 81' (o.g.)

30	VfL Wolfsburg	1–1	Werder Bremen
	Hristov 22'		Valdez 6'

31	Arminia Bielefeld	0–1	VfL Wolfsburg
			Karhan 45' (pen.)

32	VfL Wolfsburg	0–3	1. FSV Mainz 05
			Thurk 5'; Auer 80', 85'

33	VfB Stuttgart	2–1	VfL Wolfsburg
	Ljuboja 17' (pen.); Gentner 70'		Menseguez 5'

34	VfL Wolfsburg	2–2	1. FC Kaiserslautern
	Makiadi 66'; Klimowicz 69'		Halil Altıntop 20'; Ziemer 86'
