= 2010–11 VfL Wolfsburg season =

VfL Wolfsburg
2010–11 season
- Manager: Steve McClaren; Pierre Littbarski; Felix Magath
- Bundesliga: 15th
- DFB-Pokal: Round of 16
- Top goalscorer: All: Edin Džeko (11) League: Edin Džeko (10)
Home colours	Away colours	Third colours

VfL Wolfsburg suffered a nightmare season, only just staying up in Bundesliga, in spite of signing internationally seasoned players Diego and Simon Kjær. Being threatened at the bottom of the table, especially after selling key striker Edin Džeko to Manchester City. The replacements were not up to scratch, which saw manager Steve McClaren sacked. Following a short stint with Pierre Littbarski in charge, the club's 2009 championship-winning manager Felix Magath, who just had been sacked from Schalke 04, in spite of having taken them to the quarter-finals of the UEFA Champions League. Magath dropped Diego, prompting the Brazilian to refuse to sit on the substitutes' bench. In spite of the turmoil, a crucial away win at Werder Bremen helped Wolfsburg to stay just two points above Borussia Mönchengladbach in the relegation-playoff zone.

== Squad ==
=== Defenders ===
- (Italy) Andrea Barzagli
- (Germany) Michael Schulze
- (Germany) Robin Knoche
- (Germany) Marcel Schäfer
- (Germany) Arne Friedrich
- (Slovakia) Peter Pekarík
- (Germany) Alexander Madlung
- (Germany) Fabian Johnson
- (Denmark) Simon Kjær

=== Midfielders ===
- (Germany) Sascha Riether
- (Germany) Christian Gentner
- (Germany) Akaki Gogia
- (Denmark) Thomas Kahlenberg
- (Japan) Makoto Hasebe
- (Brazil) Josué
- (Germany) Ashkan Dejagah
- (Algeria) (France) Karim Ziani
- (Brazil) (Italy) Diego
- (Czech Republic) Jan Polák
- (Venezuela) Yohandry Orozco
- (South Korea) Koo Ja-cheol

=== Attackers ===
- (Brazil) Grafite
- (Bosnia and Herzegovina) Edin Džeko
- (Brazil) Caiuby
- (Turkey) Tuncay
- (Germany) Patrick Helmes
- (Croatia) Mario Mandžukić
- (Democratic Republic of the Congo) Dieumerci Mbokani

== Bundesliga ==
=== League table ===
Pos	Team	Pld	W	D	L	GF	GA	GD	Pts	Qualification or relegation
13	Werder Bremen	34	10	11	13	47	61	−14	41	
14	Schalke 04	34	11	7	16	38	44	−6	40	Qualification to Europa League play-off round (Note: Schalke 04 as winners of the 2010–11 DFB-Pokal qualified for the play-off round of the 2011–12 UEFA Europa League.)
15	VfL Wolfsburg	34	9	11	14	43	48	−5	38	
16	Borussia Mönchengladbach (O)	34	10	6	18	48	65	−17	36	Qualification to relegation play-offs
17	Eintracht Frankfurt (R)	34	9	7	18	31	49	−18	34	Relegation to 2. Bundesliga

Source: kicker
Rules for classification: 1) points; 2) goal difference; 3) number of goals scored.
(O) Play-off winners; (R) Relegated

=== Matches ===
20 August 2010 1	Bayern Munich	2–1	VfL Wolfsburg	Munich
20:30	Müller 9'; Van Bommel (yellow card) 33'; Schweinsteiger 90'	Report	Pekarík (yellow card) 43'; Džeko 55'; Cícero (yellow card) 61'	Stadium: Allianz Arena; Attendance: 69,000; Referee: Thorsten Kinhöfer (Herne)

28 August 2010 2	VfL Wolfsburg	3–4	Mainz 05	Wolfsburg
15:30	Mandžukić (yellow card) 8'; Džeko 23', 27', (yellow card) 90'; Diego 30', (yellow card) 70'	Report	Rasmussen 39'; Soto 48'; Schürrle 58'; Polanski (yellow card) 72'; Soto (yellow card) 80'; Szalai 85', (yellow card) 86'	Stadium: Volkswagen Arena; Attendance: 26,116; Referee: Peter Sippel (Munich)

11 September 2010 3	Borussia Dortmund	2–0	VfL Wolfsburg	Dortmund
15:30	Şahin 50', (yellow card) 73'; Kagawa 67'; Großkreutz (yellow card) 77'	Report	Cícero (yellow card) 26'; Diego (yellow card) 45'; Dejagah (yellow card) 87'	Stadium: Signal Iduna Park; Attendance: 73,600; Referee: Deniz Aytekin (Oberasbach)

18 September 2010 4	VfL Wolfsburg	2–0	Hannover 96	Wolfsburg
15:30	Diego (yellow card) 4', (goal) 55'; Josué (yellow card) 63'; Džeko 67'	Report	Schmiedebach (yellow card) 56'; Schulz (yellow card) 59'	Stadium: Volkswagen Arena; Attendance: 30,000; Referee: Wolfgang Stark (Ergolding)

22 September 2010 5	Hamburger SV	1–3	VfL Wolfsburg	Hamburg
20:00	Choupo-Moting 27'	Report	Džeko 15'; Grafite 71', 78'	Stadium: Imtech Arena; Attendance: 50,231; Referee: Günter Perl (Pullach im Isartal)

26 September 2010 6	VfL Wolfsburg	2–1	SC Freiburg	Wolfsburg
15:30	Grafite 25', 64'; Josué (yellow card) 43'	Report	Cissé 36'; Butscher (yellow card) 63'; Mujdža (yellow card) 78'	Stadium: Volkswagen Arena; Attendance: 26,204; Referee: Markus Schmidt (Stuttgart)

2 October 2010 7	Borussia Mönchengladbach	1–1	VfL Wolfsburg	Mönchengladbach
15:30	Bradley (yellow card) 41'; Reus (yellow card) 45'; Marx 65'	Report	Kahlenberg 27', (yellow card) 52'; Džeko (yellow card) 90'	Stadium: Borussia-Park; Attendance: 40,423; Referee: Christian Dingert (Lebecksmühle)

16 October 2010 8	VfL Wolfsburg	2–3	Bayer Leverkusen	Wolfsburg
18:30	Diego 9'; Grafite 68'; Dejagah (yellow card) 89'	Report	Barnetta (yellow card) 31'; Reinartz (yellow card) 67'; Friedrich (yellow card) 70'; Rolfes 72', 82'; Vidal 75' (pen.); Kadlec (yellow card) 77'; Sam (yellow card) 90'	Stadium: Volkswagen Arena; Attendance: 30,000; Referee: Thorsten Kinhöfer

23 October 2010 9	1. FC Nürnberg	2–1	VfL Wolfsburg	Nuremberg
15:30	Gündoğan 11'; Frantz 63'; Cohen (yellow card) 90'	Report	Josué (yellow card) 13'; Grafite (yellow card) 27', (goal) 29'; Kjær (yellow card) 88'	Stadium: Stadion Nürnberg; Attendance: 40,127; Referee: Guido Winkmann (Kerken)

30 October 2010 10	VfL Wolfsburg	2–0	VfB Stuttgart	Wolfsburg
15:30	Džeko 6', 76'	Report	Harnik (yellow card) 78'; Audel (yellow card) 79'	Stadium: Volkswagen Arena; Attendance: 29,043; Referee: Markus Wingenbach

6 November 2010 11	Eintracht Frankfurt	3–1	VfL Wolfsburg	Frankfurt
15:30	Gekas 26', 55' (pen.); Schwegler 38'; Vasoski (yellow card) 90'	Report	Džeko (yellow card) 43'; Dejagah 66'; Diego (yellow card) 90'	Stadium: Commerzbank-Arena; Attendance: 43,8000; Referee: Peter Sippel (Munich)

13 November 2010 12	VfL Wolfsburg	2–2	Schalke 04	Wolfsburg
15:30	Grafite 11'; Džeko 33'	Report	Edu 39'; Huntelaar 75'	Stadium: Volkswagen Arena; Attendance: 30,000; Referee: Wolfgang Stark

21 November 2010 13	FC St. Pauli	1–1	VfL Wolfsburg	Hamburg
17:30	Thorandt 28'	Report	Diego (yellow card) 38'; Džeko 54', (yellow card) 82'; Barzagli (yellow card) 81'	Stadium: Millerntor-Stadion; Attendance: 24,150; Referee: Markus Schmidt (Stuttgart)

28 November 2010 14	1. FC Köln	1–1	VfL Wolfsburg	Cologne
17:30	Geromel (yellow card) 19'; Podolski (yellow card) 22'; Novaković 51'	Report	Barzagli (yellow card) 63'; Cícero 81'; Kjær (yellow card) 87'	Stadium: RheinEnergieStadion; Attendance: 43,000; Referee: Guido Winkmann (Kerken)

4 December 2010 15	VfL Wolfsburg	0–0	Werder Bremen	Wolfsburg
15:30	Diego (yellow card) 35'; Barzagli (yellow card) 71'; Kjær (yellow card) 79'	Report	Prödl (yellow card) 76'	Stadium: Volkswagen Arena; Attendance: 30,000; Referee: Deniz Aytekin (Oberasbach)

11 December 2010 16	1. FC Kaiserslautern	0–0	VfL Wolfsburg	Kaiserslautern
15:30	Petsos (yellow card) 83'	Report	Ziani (yellow card) 31'; Cícero (yellow card) 63'; Hasebe (yellow card) 78'	Stadium: Fritz-Walter-Stadion; Attendance: 38,181; Referee: Peter Sippel (Munich)

18 December 2010 17	VfL Wolfsburg	2–2	1899 Hoffenheim	Wolfsburg
15:30	Madlung (yellow card) 72'; Diego 75'; Mandžukić (yellow card) 78'; Džeko 90'	Report	Luiz Gustavo 34'; Sigurðsson 40'; Salihović (yellow card) 77'	Stadium: Volkswagen Arena; Attendance: 24,512; Referee: Knut Kircher (Rottenburg)

15 January 2011 18	VfL Wolfsburg	1–1	Bayern Munich	Wolfsburg
15:30	Mandžukić (yellow card) 3'; Josué (yellow card) 56'; Riether 86'	Report	Müller 7'; Schweinsteiger (yellow card) 45'; Badstuber (yellow card) 49'	Stadium: Volkswagen Arena; Attendance: 30,000; Referee: Manuel Gräfe (Berlin)

22 January 2011 19	Mainz 05	0–1	VfL Wolfsburg	Mainz
15:30	Polanski (yellow card) 77'	Report	Friedrich (yellow card) 70'; Kjær 82'	Stadium: Bruchwegstadion; Attendance: 18,900; Referee: Günter Perl (Pullach im Isartal)

29 January 2011 20	VfL Wolfsburg	0–3	Borussia Dortmund	Wolfsburg
15:30	Friedrich (yellow card) 53'; Pekarík (yellow card) 68'	Report	Barrios 2'; Şahin 40'; Piszczek (yellow card) 63'; Hummels 71'; Subotić (yellow card) 77'	Stadium: Volkswagen Arena; Attendance: 30,000; Referee: Knut Kircher (Rottenburg)

5 February 2011 21	Hannover 96	1–0	VfL Wolfsburg	Hanover
15:30	Pinto 4'; Ya Konan (yellow card) 37'	Report	Kjær (yellow card) 60'; Grafite (yellow card) 70'; Pekarík (yellow card) 84'	Stadium: AWD-Arena; Attendance: 37,213; Referee: Guido Winkmann (Kerken)

12 February 2011 22	VfL Wolfsburg	0–1	Hamburger SV	Wolfsburg
15:30	Kjær (yellow card) 32'; Grafite (yellow card) 60'; Polák (yellow card) 67'; Friedrich (yellow card) 73'	Report	Petrić 33' (pen.); Aogo (yellow card) 90'	Stadium: Volkswagen Arena; Attendance: 30,000; Referee: Marco Fritz (Korb)

19 February 2011 23	SC Freiburg	2–1	VfL Wolfsburg	Freiburg
15:30	Mujdža (yellow card) 31'; Reisinger 43'; Cissé 69'; Barth (yellow card) 75'; Butscher (yellow card) 89'	Report	Helmes 28'	Stadium: Badenova-Stadion; Attendance: 19,200; Referee: Robert Hartmann (Wangen)

25 February 2011 24	VfL Wolfsburg	2–1	Borussia Mönchengladbach	Wolfsburg
20:30	Diego 37', 45', (yellow card) 85'; Friedrich (yellow card) 59'; Polák (yellow card) 73'; Mandžukić (yellow card) 88'	Report	Reus (yellow card) 41'; Stranzl (yellow card) 64'; Daems 74' (pen.); De Camargo (yellow card) 77'	Stadium: Volkswagen Arena; Attendance: 28,763; Referee: Jochen Drees (Münster-Sarmsheim)

5 March 2011 25	Bayer Leverkusen	3–0	VfL Wolfsburg	Leverkusen
18:30	L. Bender 21'; Augusto 29'; Kießling 46'	Report	Cícero (yellow card) 45'; Mbokani (yellow card) 69'; Friedrich (yellow card) 71'; Koo (yellow card) 84'	Stadium: BayArena; Attendance: 28,115; Referee: Felix Zwayer (Berlin)

12 March 2011 26	VfL Wolfsburg	1–2	1. FC Nürnberg	Wolfsburg
15:30	Mbokani (yellow card) 20'; Mandžukić 23'; Pekarík (yellow card) 58'	Report	Chandler (yellow card) 34'; Wollscheid 45'; Wolf (yellow card) 61'; Pinola (yellow card) 67'; Nilsson 90'	Stadium: Volkswagen Arena; Attendance: 27,316; Referee: Guido Winkmann (Kerken)

20 March 2011 27	VfB Stuttgart	1–1	VfL Wolfsburg	Stuttgart
17:30	Niedermeier 90'; Schipplock (yellow card) 90'	Report	Pekarík (yellow card) 22'; Grafite 40'; Kjær (yellow card) 45'; Lenz (yellow card) 66'	Stadium: Mercedes-Benz Arena; Attendance: 38,500; Referee: Manuel Gräfe (Berlin)

3 April 2011 28	VfL Wolfsburg	1–1	Eintracht Frankfurt	Wolfsburg
17:30	Mandžukić (yellow card) 51', (goal) 85'; Friedrich (yellow card) 71' (yellow-red card) 71'	Report	Ochs (yellow card) 13'; Altıntop (yellow card) 48'; Meier 59'; Rode (yellow card) 68'; Franz (yellow card) 70'; Tzavellas (yellow card) 82'	Stadium: Volkswagen Arena; Attendance: 29,125; Referee: Thorsten Kinhöfer (Herne)

9 April 2011 29	Schalke 04	1–0	VfL Wolfsburg	Gelsenkirchen
15:30	Jurado 76'; Baumjohann (yellow card) 90'	Report	Grafite (yellow card) 48'; Cícero (yellow card) 51'; Koo (yellow card) 54'	Stadium: Veltins-Arena; Attendance: 61,673; Referee: Peter Sippel (Munich)

16 April 2011 30	VfL Wolfsburg	2–2	FC St. Pauli	Wolfsburg
15:30	Mandžukić 39'; Hasebe (yellow card) 50'; Koo (yellow card) 81'; Polák 88'	Report	Bruns (yellow card) 41'; Naki 61'; Asamoah (yellow card) 69'; Lehmann 77'	Stadium: Volkswagen Arena; Attendance: 30,000; Referee: Felix Brych (Munich)

24 April 2011 31	VfL Wolfsburg	4–1	1. FC Köln	Wolfsburg
15:30	Mandžukić 14', 39'; Dejagah 58', 88'	Report	Freis 40'	Stadium: Volkswagen Arena; Attendance: 30,000; Referee: Günter Perl (Pullach im Isartal)

29 April 2011 32	Werder Bremen	0–1	VfL Wolfsburg	Bremen
20:30	Mertesacker (yellow card) 65'; Frings (yellow card) 66'	Report	Riether 22'; Friedrich (yellow card) 27'; Cícero (yellow card) 31'; Mandžukić (yellow card) 47'; Grafite (yellow card) 61'	Stadium: Weser-Stadion; Attendance: 40,000; Referee: Manuel Gräfe (Berlin)

7 May 2011 33	VfL Wolfsburg	1–2	1. FC Kaiserslautern	Wolfsburg
15:30	Mandžukić 6'	Report	Lakić 25'; Amedick 46'; De Wit (yellow card) 90'	Stadium: Volkswagen Arena; Attendance: 30,000; Referee: Knut Kircher (Rottenburg)

14 May 2011 34	1899 Hoffenheim	1–3	VfL Wolfsburg	Sinsheim
15:30	Firmino 49'	Report	Madlung (yellow card) 52'; Mandžukić 60', 73'; Grafite 78'	Stadium: Rhein-Neckar-Arena; Attendance: 30,150; Referee: Thorsten Kinhöfer (Herne)

=== Top scorers ===
- (Bosnia and Herzegovina) Edin Džeko (10)
- (Croatia) Mario Mandžukić (8)
- (Brazil) Grafite (9)
- (Brazil) Diego (6)

== DFB-Pokal ==
15 August 2010 First round	Preußen Münster	1–2	VfL Wolfsburg	Münster
17:30	Džeko 86' (o.g.)	Report (in German)	Cícero 80'; Grafite 88'	Stadium: Preußen-Stadion; Attendance: 15,050 (capacity crowd); Referee: Peter Gagelmann

26 October 2010 Second round	Victoria Hamburg	1–3	VfL Wolfsburg	Hamburg
19:00	Rahn 71'	Report (in German)	Pekarík 17'; Josué 52'; Schäfer 55'	Stadium: Millerntor-Stadion; Attendance: 7,000; Referee: Christian Leicher

22 December 2010 Round of 16	VfL Wolfsburg	1–3	Energie Cottbus	Wolfsburg
19:00	Džeko 56'	Report (in German)	Petersen 1', 43'; Shao 40'	Stadium: Volkswagen Arena; Attendance: 10,801; Referee: Peter Gagelmann
