= Marwin Hitz =

Swiss footballer (born 1987)

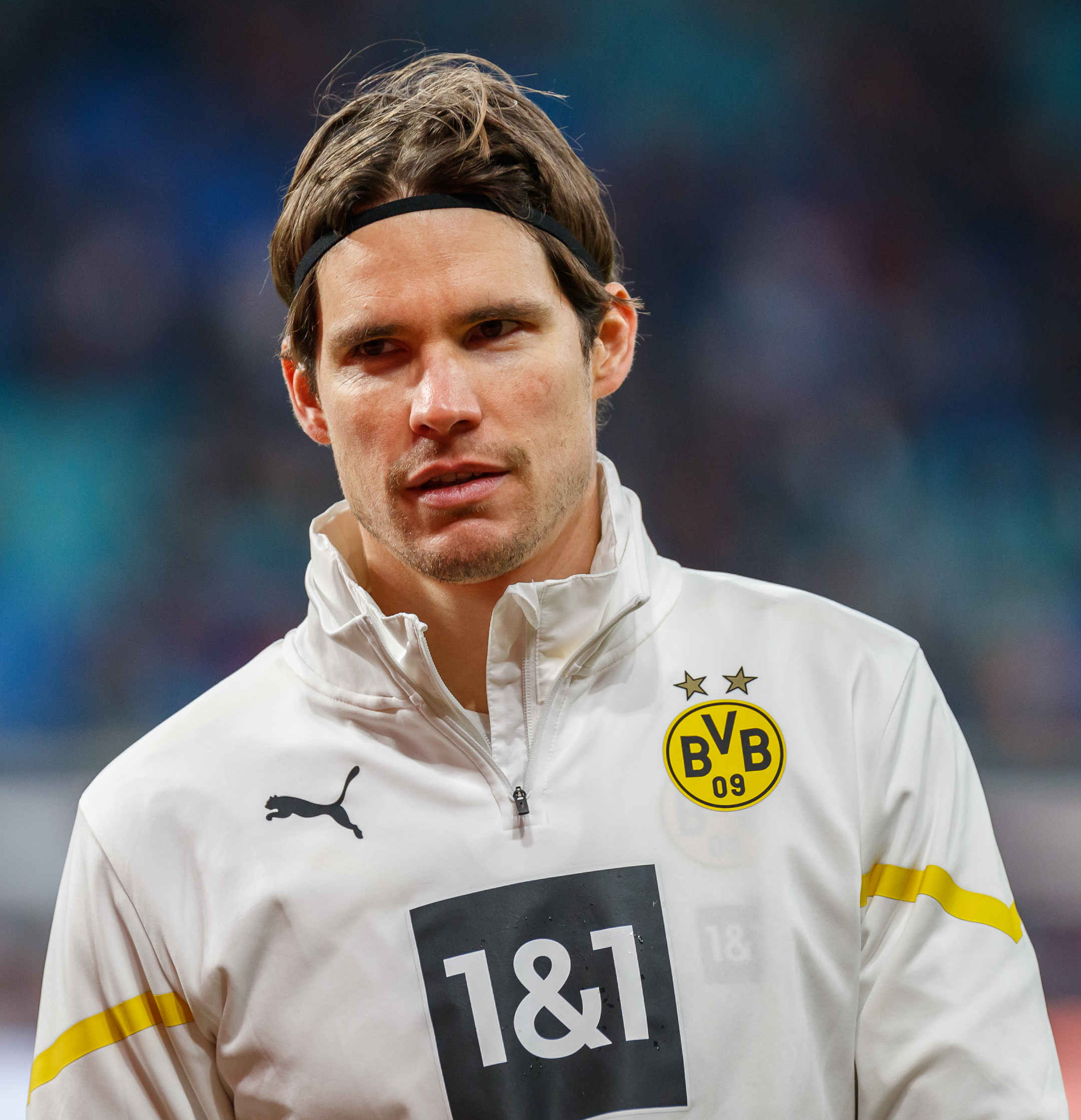
- Hitz with Borussia Dortmund in 2021

Personal information
- Date of birth: 18 September 1987 (age 39)
- Place of birth: St. Gallen, Switzerland
- Height: 1.94 m (6 ft 4 in)
- Position: Goalkeeper

Youth career
- 1996–2005: St. Gallen

Senior career*
Years	Team	Apps	(Gls)
2005–2008	St. Gallen II	38	(0)
2007	→ Yverdon-Sport (loan)	0	(0)
2008	→ Winterthur (loan)	15	(0)
2008–2009	VfL Wolfsburg II	45	(0)
2008–2013	VfL Wolfsburg	13	(0)
2013–2018	FC Augsburg	141	(1)
2014	FC Augsburg II	1	(0)
2018–2022	Borussia Dortmund	27	(0)
2022–2026	Basel	133	(0)
Total		413	(1)

International career
2006	Switzerland U21	2	(0)
2015–2016	Switzerland	2	(0)
- * Club domestic league appearances and goals

Marwin Hitz (born 18 September 1987) is a Swiss former professional footballer who played as a goalkeeper.

== Club career ==
=== Early career ===
Born in St. Gallen, Hitz was signed by his hometown club when he was nine years old. He represented the club at youth level, and regularly played for the reserve team from 2005 to 2007. The closest he got to the first team was as an unused substitute in 2005 and 2006. In the 2007–08 season, he went on loan to Yverdon-Sport, and then to Winterthur, ending the season as first-choice goalkeeper at the latter club.

=== Wolfsburg ===
On 2 September 2008, Hitz signed for Bundesliga club VfL Wolfsburg. He mainly played for the reserve team, but he was an unused substitute for two matches in early 2009. He made his debut for the first team in a Europa League match against the Spanish team Villarreal, and made his Bundesliga debut in a match against Schalke 04. While at Wolfsburg, he initially deputised for André Lenz and then mid-season signing Diego Benaglio, who he failed to displace. In fact, the six appearances he made during the 2010–11 season (his personal best at the club), was due to Benaglio tearing his abductor muscle and later, not being in the squad.

=== Augsburg ===
Hitz joined FC Augsburg in the summer of 2013. On 29 March 2014, Mainz 05's Eric Maxim Choupo-Moting had a shot that was deflected by Matthias Ostrzolek, which Hitz tipped away onto the post. Ostrzolek, under pressure from Nicolai Müller, tried to clear the rebound, but it caught Hitz in the face, resulting in an own goal.

On 21 February 2015, Hitz scored a stoppage-time equaliser for Augsburg in a league match against Bayer Leverkusen in a 2–2 draw. On 5 December, Hitz intentionally sabotaged the ground near the penalty spot after a penalty was awarded to 1. FC Köln in their match against Augsburg. Anthony Modeste missed the penalty, and Augsburg went on to win the match 1–0. Hitz later apologised for his actions. Hitz was billed €122.92 by 1. FC Köln for the damage he caused to the pitch, which he agreed to pay.

=== Borussia Dortmund ===
On 18 May 2018, Hitz signed a three-year contract with Borussia Dortmund, where he deputised for Roman Bürki. He made two appearances in the league, with his debut on 10 November in a 3–2 win over Bayern Munich, and then late on in the season in a 3–2 win over Fortuna Düsseldorf. On 17 August, the opening day of the season, Hitz started the match against his former club Augsburg. Although he conceded in the first minute to Florian Niederlechner's tap-in, Dortmund went on to win 5–1. Hitz came on for the last twenty minutes after Bürki was injured in a 1–0 win over Borussia Mönchengladbach. He kept his place, as Bürki missed the match due to illness, in a 0–0 draw with Schalke 04, and again, for a 3–0 win over VfL Wolfsburg.

Hitz made his first appearance of the 2020–21 season, in a 4–0 win over Freiburg, after Bürki was ruled out with an infection. He played in the next match, a 1–0 win over Hoffenheim, before returning to the bench. On 20 October, during Dortmund's Champions League opener against Lazio, Hitz inadvertently scored an own goal when Luiz Felipe's header was deflected in by the Austrian. From January to May 2021, Hitz had his longest spell as the first-choice goalkeeper, when Bürki had a shoulder injury. His season ended during a 3–2 win against RB Leipzig, after suffering a knee injury.

=== Basel ===
On 20 May 2022, Hitz returned to Switzerland and signed a three-year contract with Basel under head coach Alexander Frei. After playing in three test games Hitz played his domestic league debut for his new club in the away game in the Schützenwiese on 16 July 2022 as Basel drew 1–1 with Winterthur. On 23 April 2026, Basel announced that Hitz would be retiring from professional football at the end of the 2025–26 season. On 14 May 2026, Hitz made his final home appearance in the Swiss Super League match against St. Gallen.

== International career ==
On 10 June 2015, Hitz won his first cap for Switzerland in a 3–0 friendly win over Liechtenstein at Stockhorn Arena in Thun.

Hitz was part of the squad for UEFA Euro 2016, but did not play in any matches for Switzerland at the tournament. Ultimately, his side were eliminated in the second round after losing 5–4 on penalties to Poland.

== Personal life ==
Hitz has three children with his wife Patricia.

== Career statistics ==
=== Club ===
Appearances and goals by club, season and competition
Club	Season	League			Cup		Europe		Other		Total	
Club	Season	Division	Apps	Goals	Apps	Goals	Apps	Goals	Apps	Goals	Apps	Goals
St. Gallen	2003–04	Swiss Super League	0	0	0	0	—		—		0	0
St. Gallen	2004–05	Swiss Super League	0	0	0	0	—		—		0	0
St. Gallen	2005–06	Swiss Super League	0	0	0	0	—		—		0	0
St. Gallen	2006–07	Swiss Super League	0	0	0	0	—		—		0	0
St. Gallen	Total		0	0	0	0	—		—		0	0
Yverdon-Sport (loan)	2007–08	Swiss Challenge League	0	0	0	0	—		—		0	0
Winterthur (loan)	2007–08	Swiss Challenge League	10	0	—		—		—		10	0
Winterthur (loan)	2008–09	Swiss Challenge League	5	0	—		—		—		5	0
Winterthur (loan)	Total		15	0	—		—		—		15	0
VfL Wolfsburg II	2008–09	Regionalliga Nord	6	0	—		—		—		6	0
VfL Wolfsburg II	2009–10	Regionalliga Nord	29	0	—		—		—		29	0
VfL Wolfsburg II	2010–11	Regionalliga Nord	10	0	—		—		—		10	0
VfL Wolfsburg II	Total		45	0	—		—		—		45	0
VfL Wolfsburg	2008–09	Bundesliga	0	0	0	0	0	0	—		0	0
VfL Wolfsburg	2009–10	Bundesliga	5	0	0	0	4	0	—		9	0
VfL Wolfsburg	2010–11	Bundesliga	6	0	1	0	—		—		7	0
VfL Wolfsburg	2011–12	Bundesliga	2	0	0	0	—		—		2	0
VfL Wolfsburg	2012–13	Bundesliga	0	0	1	0	—		—		1	0
VfL Wolfsburg	Total		13	0	2	0	4	0	—		19	0
FC Augsburg	2013–14	Bundesliga	19	0	1	0	—		—		20	0
FC Augsburg	2014–15	Bundesliga	25	1	1	0	—		—		26	1
FC Augsburg	2015–16	Bundesliga	33	0	3	0	8	0	—		44	0
FC Augsburg	2016–17	Bundesliga	32	0	2	0	—		—		34	0
FC Augsburg	2017–18	Bundesliga	32	0	1	0	—		—		33	0
FC Augsburg	Total		141	1	8	0	8	0	—		157	1
Borussia Dortmund	2018–19	Bundesliga	2	0	1	0	1	0	—		4	0
Borussia Dortmund	2019–20	Bundesliga	4	0	3	0	0	0	1	0	8	0
Borussia Dortmund	2020–21	Bundesliga	16	0	5	0	6	0	1	0	28	0
Borussia Dortmund	2021–22	Bundesliga	5	0	1	0	0	0	0	0	6	0
Borussia Dortmund	Total		27	0	10	0	7	0	2	0	46	0
Basel	2022–23	Swiss Super League	32	0	2	0	18	0	—		52	0
Basel	2023–24	Swiss Super League	32	0	2	0	0	0	—		34	0
Basel	2024–25	Swiss Super League	36	0	4	0	—		—		40	0
Basel	2025–26	Swiss Super League	33	0	1	0	9	0	—		43	0
Basel	Total		133	0	9	0	27	0	—		170	0
Career total			374	1	29	0	46	0	2	0	451	1

== Honours ==
Borussia Dortmund

- DFB-Pokal: 2020–21
- DFL-Supercup: 2019

Basel

- Swiss Super League: 2024–25
