= Peter Pekarík =

Slovak footballer (born 1986)

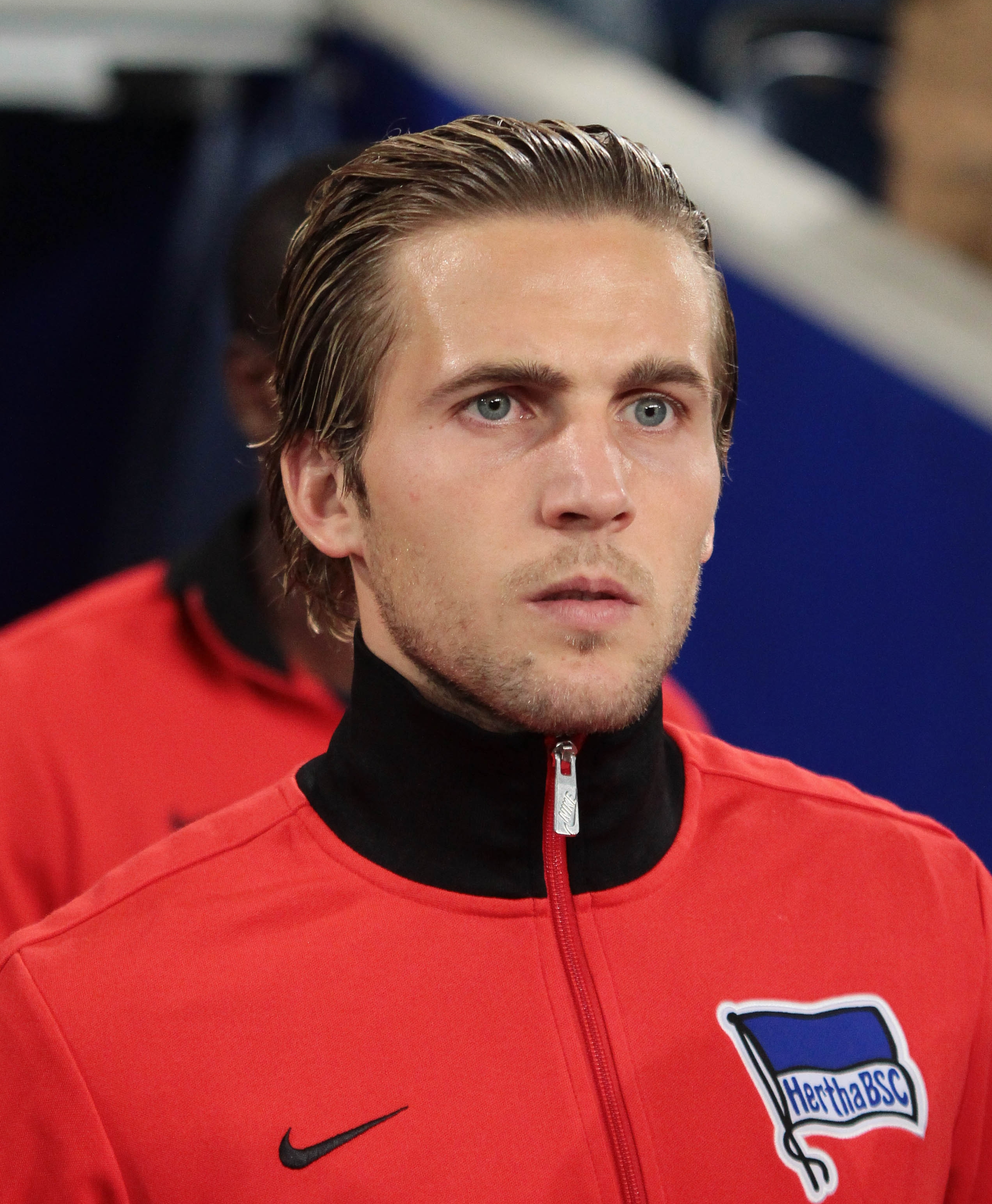
- Pekarík with Hertha BSC in 2012

Personal information
- Full name: Peter Pekarík
- Date of birth: 30 October 1986 (age 40)
- Place of birth: Žilina, Czechoslovakia
- Height: 1.77 m (5 ft 10 in)
- Position: Right-back

Youth career
- Žilina

Senior career*
Years	Team	Apps	(Gls)
2004–2009	Žilina	111	(5)
2004–2005	→ Dubnica (loan)	27	(0)
2009–2012	VfL Wolfsburg	55	(0)
2011–2012	→ Kayserispor (loan)	27	(0)
2012–2024	Hertha BSC	212	(5)
2024	Žilina	7	(1)
2025	České Budějovice	9	(0)
2025–2026	Hertha BSC II	16	(0)

International career^{‡}
2006–2026	Slovakia	138	(2)
- * Club domestic league appearances and goals as of 14 April 2026 ‡ National team caps and goals as of 5 June 2026

Peter Pekarík (Slovak pronunciation: [ˈpeter ˈpekariːk]; born 30 October 1986) is a Slovak former professional footballer who played as a right-back for the Slovakia national team, for which he is the joint most capped player with 138 caps.

== Club career ==
=== MŠK Žilina ===
Born in Žilina, Pekarík played football at the youth section of his local club.[3] His Corgoň Liga debut came for ZŤS Dubnica. In his first season, he played 27 matches and came back to MŠK Žilina in summer 2005. Pekarík won the Corgoň Liga in the 2006–07 season, playing 35 matches.

=== Germany and loan to Kayserispor ===
Following great performances in the 2008–09 Slovak Superliga, Pekarík and signed a four-and-a-half-year contract for Bundesliga side VfL Wolfsburg in January 2009. On 31 January 2009, he made his Bundesliga debut during a 1–1 draw against 1. FC Köln, only to be replaced by Cristian Zaccardo at half-time. Except for one game, Pekarík played in all matches of the second half as Wolfsburg won its first Bundesliga title.

In August 2011, Pekarík joined Turkish Süper Lig club Kayserispor for the 2011–12 season on loan.

After a loan in Turkey, Pekarík returned to Germany, signing for Hertha BSC. On 31 March 2017, in his eighth season in Germany, he scored his first Bundesliga goal in a 3–1 loss against 1899 Hoffenheim which was his 151st Bundesliga match.

=== Return to MŠK Žilina ===
On 26 September 2024, Pekarík returned to his hometown club MŠK Žilina after 15 years of playing abroad, signing a contract until 30 January 2025.

=== Dynamo České Budějovice ===
On 10 February 2025, Pekarík signed a contract with Dynamo České Budějovice until the end of the season as a free agent.

=== Return to Germany ===
In August 2025, Pekarík returned to Berlin to join Hertha BSC II.

== International career ==
=== Early international career ===
On 10 December 2006, Pekarík debuted for the Slovak senior squad in a friendly match against United Arab Emirates. He scored his first international goal in a 7–0 home victory over San Marino.

Pekarík was included the Slovakia squad for the 2010 FIFA World Cup. After being an unused substitute in the opening match against New Zealand, he started the second and third Group F matches, assisting Kamil Kopúnek's decisive third goal in the 3–2 win over Italy that qualified Slovakia for the knockout stage. He went on to start in the team's round of 16 match against the Netherlands, where they lost 2–1.

Pekarík played in all four of Slovakia's matches at UEFA Euro 2016, where the team reached the round of 16, losing to Germany and all three of their matches at UEFA Euro 2020.

=== 2020s ===
On 1 June 2021, Pekarík played his 100th match for Slovakia in a friendly 1–1 draw against Bulgaria. He was named in Slovakia's squad for UEFA Euro 2024 and played in all four of the team's matches at the tournament. This made him one of two players, along with the Juraj Kucka, to play in all eleven of Slovakia's matches in UEFA European Championships as an independent nation.

On 5 June 2026, he made his final international appearance in a 2–2 friendly draw against Montenegro, earning his 138th cap and equaling Marek Hamšík's record for the most appearances for Slovakia.

== Style of play ==
British newspaper The Guardian praised Pekarík for his important leadership qualities as a centre-back.

== Career statistics ==
=== Club ===
As of match played 14 April 2026

Appearances and goals by club, season and competition
Club	Season	League			Cup		Continental		Other		Total	
Club	Season	Division	Apps	Goals	Apps	Goals	Apps	Goals	Apps	Goals	Apps	Goals
MFK Dubnica (loan)	2004–05	Slovak Superliga	27	0	–		–		–		27	0
Žilina	2005–06	Slovak Superliga	27	2	–		4	0	–		31	2
Žilina	2006–07	Slovak Superliga	35	0	–		–		–		35	0
Žilina	2007–08	Slovak Superliga	31	0	–		4	0	–		35	0
Žilina	2008–09	Slovak Superliga	18	3	–		10	0	–		28	3
Žilina	Total		111	5	–		18	0	–		129	5
VfL Wolfsburg	2008–09	Bundesliga	16	0	2	0	–		–		18	0
VfL Wolfsburg	2009–10	Bundesliga	16	0	0	0	7	0	–		23	0
VfL Wolfsburg	2010–11	Bundesliga	23	0	1	1	–		–		24	1
VfL Wolfsburg	Total		55	0	3	1	7	0	–		65	1
Kayserispor (loan)	2011–12	Süper Lig	27	0	2	0	–		–		29	0
Hertha BSC	2012–13	2. Bundesliga	19	0	0	0	–		–		19	0
Hertha BSC	2013–14	Bundesliga	31	0	0	0	–		–		31	0
Hertha BSC	2014–15	Bundesliga	30	0	2	0	–		–		32	0
Hertha BSC	2015–16	Bundesliga	12	0	1	0	–		–		13	0
Hertha BSC	2016–17	Bundesliga	31	1	3	0	2	0	–		36	1
Hertha BSC	2017–18	Bundesliga	17	0	1	0	5	0	–		23	0
Hertha BSC	2018–19	Bundesliga	3	0	0	0	–		–		3	0
Hertha BSC	2019–20	Bundesliga	9	0	0	0	–		–		9	0
Hertha BSC	2020–21	Bundesliga	23	3	1	1	–		–		24	4
Hertha BSC	2021–22	Bundesliga	27	1	2	0	–		2	0	31	1
Hertha BSC	2022–23	Bundesliga	5	0	0	0	–		–		5	0
Hertha BSC	2023–24	2. Bundesliga	5	0	0	0	–		–		5	0
Hertha BSC	Total		212	5	10	1	7	0	2	0	231	5
Žilina	2024–25	Slovak First Football League	7	1	1	0	–		–		8	1
České Budějovice	2024–25	Czech First League	9	0	–		–		–		9	0
Hertha BSC II	2025–26	Regionalliga Nordost	16	0	–		–		–		16	0
Career total			491	11	16	2	32	0	2	0	540	13

=== International ===
As of match played 5 June 2026

Appearances and goals by national team and year
National team	Year	Apps	Goals
Slovakia	2006	1	0
Slovakia	2007	0	0
Slovakia	2008	5	0
Slovakia	2009	12	1
Slovakia	2010	10	0
Slovakia	2011	8	0
Slovakia	2012	8	0
Slovakia	2013	6	0
Slovakia	2014	8	0
Slovakia	2015	5	1
Slovakia	2016	10	0
Slovakia	2017	7	0
Slovakia	2018	5	0
Slovakia	2019	6	0
Slovakia	2020	6	0
Slovakia	2021	12	0
Slovakia	2022	6	0
Slovakia	2023	9	0
Slovakia	2024	10	0
Slovakia	2025	2	0
Slovakia	2026	2	0
Total		138	2

Scores and results list Slovakia's goal tally first, score column indicates score after each Pekarík goal.

List of international goals scored by Peter Pekarík
No.	Date	Venue	Opponent	Score	Result	Competition
1	6 June 2009	Tehelné pole, Bratislava, Slovakia	San Marino	2–0	7–0	2010 FIFA World Cup qualification
2	27 March 2015	Štadión pod Dubňom, Žilina, Slovakia	Luxembourg	3–0	3–0	UEFA Euro 2016 qualifying

== Honours ==
MŠK Žilina

- Fortuna Liga: 2006–07
- Slovak Super Cup: 2007

VfL Wolfsburg

- Bundesliga: 2008–09

Hertha BSC

- 2. Bundesliga: 2012–13

Slovakia

- King's Cup: 2018

== See also ==
- List of men's footballers with 100 or more international caps
