= André Lenz =

German footballer

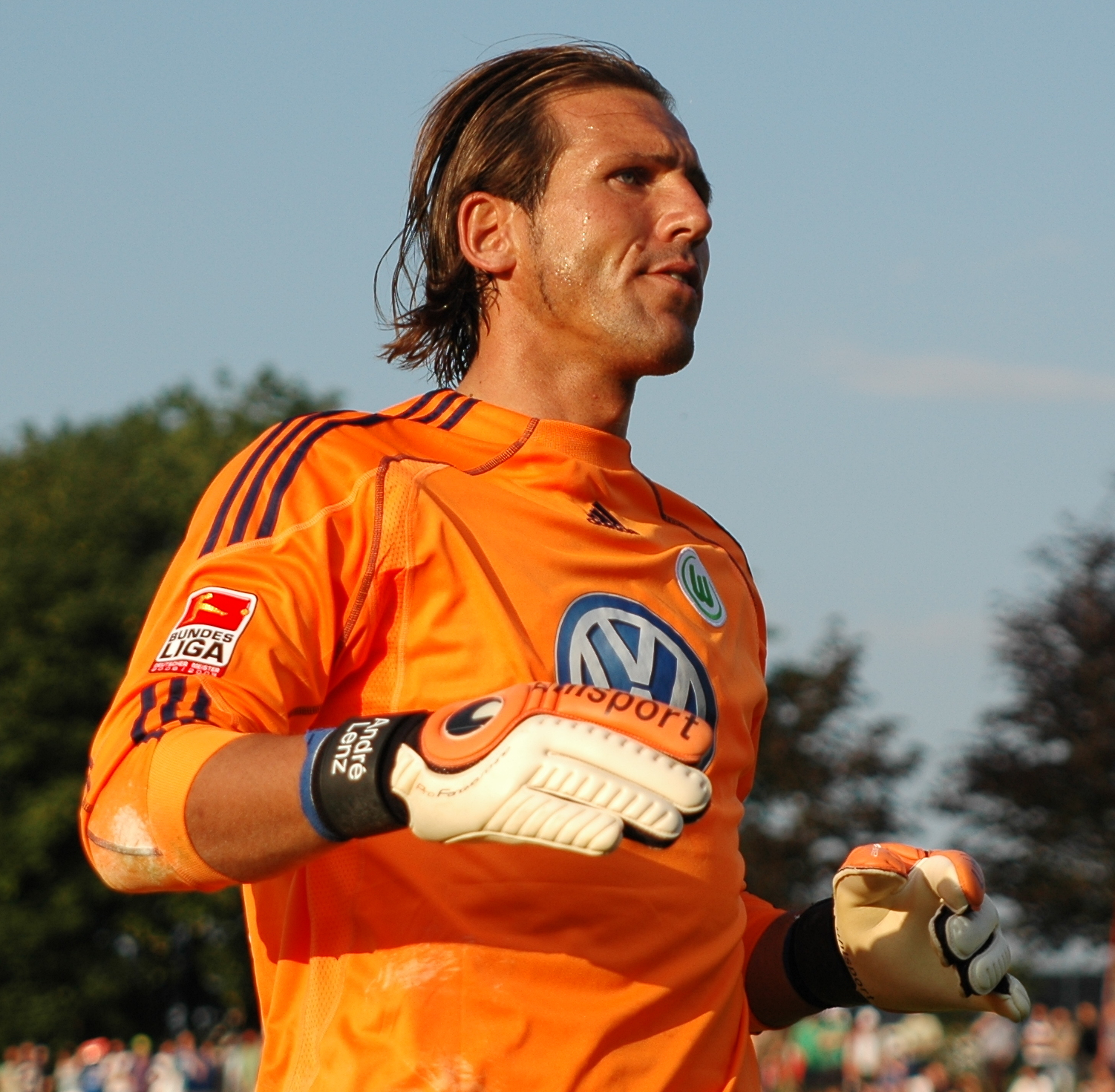
- Lenz playing for Wolfsburg in 2009

Personal information
- Date of birth: 19 November 1973 (age 52)
- Place of birth: Mülheim an der Ruhr, West Germany
- Height: 1.91 m (6 ft 3 in)
- Position: Goalkeeper

Youth career
- 1979–1989: TV Asberg
- 1989–1990: Bayer Uerdingen
- 1990–1992: Wuppertaler SV

Senior career*
Years	Team	Apps	(Gls)
1992–1996	Wuppertaler SV		
1997–2001	Alemannia Aachen	99	(0)
2001–2003	Energie Cottbus	26	(0)
2003–2004	1860 Munich	3	(0)
2004–2012	VfL Wolfsburg	18	(0)
2004–2008	VfL Wolfsburg II	6	(0)
Total		152	(0)
- * Club domestic league appearances and goals

André Lenz (born 19 November 1973) is a German former professional footballer who played as a goalkeeper.

== Career as player ==
Lenz was born in Mülheim an der Ruhr. In 1990 he moved to Wuppertaler SV, where he was a professional from 1992. From 1992 to 1994, he played with Wuppertal in the 2. Bundesliga and then in the Regionalliga West/Südwest. He began his football career as a professional in 1999. Back then, he played for Alemannia Aachen in the 2. Bundesliga. In 2001, he signed a contract with Energie Cottbus, who were playing in the first division. In his second year for Energie, he played almost every match. After Energie was relegated in 2003, TSV 1860 Munich were interested in signing him, eventually he chose to sign. In 2004, it was confirmed that Lenz would be leaving 1860 Munich to join Bundesliga's VfL Wolfsburg. His Munich competitor Simon Jentzsch also went to the Wolves and Lenz had to be content with the place on the bench.

After coach Felix Magath retired Jentzsch shortly before the winter break of the 2007/08 season, Lenz took over the number 1 position for three games. After the winter break, he stepped back into the second row behind newly signed Swiss international goalkeeper Diego Benaglio.

In April 2009, Lenz's contract was extended until 2010.

At the end of the 2008/09 season, VfL Wolfsburg became German champions for the first time in the club's history. It is also Lenz's first title success in professional football.

During the season, he deputized for first-choice goalkeeper Benaglio in three full-time games and two more after substitutions. None of the matches were lost. Also in the 2009/10 season, Lenz replaced Benaglio only when he was suspended and at the beginning of the second half of the season during a protracted injury. However, he sustained an ankle injury himself. The number three, Marwin Hitz, then took the place between the posts. Although Lenz went into the following season as nominal number two, Hitz was given preference when Benaglio suffered another long-term injury.

In the 2010/11 season, Lenz was again behind Benaglio and Hitz, which is why he was only used once: on the 27th matchday in the Bundesliga game between VfB Stuttgart and VfL Wolfsburg, which ended 1–1.

Lenz announced his retirement from active play following the conclusion of the 2012–13 Bundesliga season.

== Career as an official ==
Lenz took over the position of team manager at VfL Wolfsburg after retiring on 1 July 2012. On 30 October 2012, five days after Felix Magath's dismissal, Lenz also ended the cooperation with VfL Wolfsburg by mutual agreement.

== Personal life ==
On the night of 9 May 2010, Lenz was stabbed in a nightclub in Wolfsburg when the VfL Wolfsburg team celebrated Edin Džeko's win of the top goalscorer award and a violent altercation broke out. Lenz was injured so badly that he had to undergo emergency surgery that same night. The public prosecutor responsible came to the conclusion that "Lenz only wanted to intervene in an arbitration manner." In May 2011, the district attorney in Wolfsburg sentenced a nightclub bouncer, who has since been fired, to two years' suspended sentence for causing dangerous bodily harm after he admitted to stabbing Lenz. In addition, he had to pay Lenz compensation for pain and suffering in the amount of 7,000 euros.

Lenz owns shares in a bar in Barcelona run by his brother.

== Career statistics ==
=== Club ===
Appearances and goals by club, season and competition
Club	Season	League			Cup		Europe		Other		Total	
Club	Season	Division	Apps	Goals	Apps	Goals	Apps	Goals	Apps	Goals	Apps	Goals
Alemannia Aachen	1997–98	Regionalliga West/Südwest	15	0	0	0	—		—		15	0
Alemannia Aachen	1998–99	Regionalliga West/Südwest	22	0	—		—		—		22	0
Alemannia Aachen	1999–2000	2. Bundesliga	29	0	1	0	—		—		30	0
Alemannia Aachen	2000–01	2. Bundesliga	33	0	2	0	—		—		35	0
Alemannia Aachen	Total		99	0	3	0	—		—		102	0
Energie Cottbus	2001–02	Bundesliga	3	0	0	0	—		—		3	0
Energie Cottbus	2002–03	Bundesliga	23	0	2	0	—		—		25	0
Energie Cottbus	Total		26	0	2	0	—		—		28	0
1860 Munich	2003–04	Bundesliga	3	0	2	0	—		—		15	0
VfL Wolfsburg	2004–05	Bundesliga	1	0	0	0	—		—		1	0
VfL Wolfsburg	2005–06	Bundesliga	0	0	0	0	0	0	—		0	0
VfL Wolfsburg	2006–07	Bundesliga	0	0	0	0	—		—		0	0
VfL Wolfsburg	2007–08	Bundesliga	3	0	0	0	—		—		3	0
VfL Wolfsburg	2008–09	Bundesliga	5	0	0	0	1	0	—		6	0
VfL Wolfsburg	2009–10	Bundesliga	8	0	0	0	0	0	—		8	0
VfL Wolfsburg	2010–11	Bundesliga	1	0	0	0	—		—		1	0
VfL Wolfsburg	2011–12	Bundesliga	0	0	0	0	—		—		0	0
VfL Wolfsburg	Total		18	0	0	0	1	0	—		19	0
VfL Wolfsburg II	2004–05	Regionalliga Nord	1	0	—		—		—		1	0
VfL Wolfsburg II	2005–06	NOFV-Oberliga	2	0	—		—		—		2	0
VfL Wolfsburg II	2006–07	NOFV-Oberliga	2	0	—		—		—		2	0
VfL Wolfsburg II	2007–08	NOFV-Oberliga	1	0	—		—		—		1	0
VfL Wolfsburg II	Total		6	0	—		—		—		6	0
Career total			152	0	7	0	1	0	0	0	160	0

== Honours ==
- Bundesliga: 2008–09
