= Mike Hanke =

German footballer (born 1983)

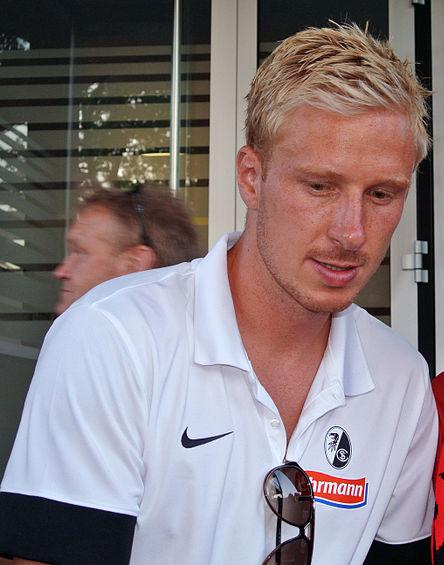
- Hanke in 2013

Personal information
- Full name: Mike Hanke
- Date of birth: 5 November 1983 (age 43)
- Place of birth: Hamm, West Germany
- Height: 1.85 m (6 ft 1 in)
- Position: Forward

Youth career
- 1989–1996: TuS 1910 Wiescherhöfen
- 1996–1999: Hammer SpVg
- 1999–2000: VfL Bochum
- 2000–2001: Schalke 04

Senior career*
Years	Team	Apps	(Gls)
2001–2005	Schalke 04 II	25	(22)
2001–2005	Schalke 04	58	(7)
2005–2007	VfL Wolfsburg	53	(16)
2007–2010	Hannover 96	81	(19)
2010	Hannover 96 II	1	(2)
2011–2013	Borussia Mönchengladbach	77	(13)
2013–2014	SC Freiburg	15	(2)
2014	Guizhou Renhe	12	(1)
Total		322	(71)

International career
2000–2001	Germany U18	16	(9)
2001–2002	Germany U19	13	(7)
2002–2003	Germany U20	9	(8)
2003–2005	Germany U21	26	(14)
2004	Germany Team 2006	1	(0)
2005–2007	Germany	12	(1)
- * Club domestic league appearances and goals

Mike Hanke (German pronunciation: [maɪk ˈhaŋkə]; born 5 November 1983) is a German former professional footballer who played as a forward. He played for the Bundesliga clubs Schalke 04, VfL Wolfsburg, Hannover 96, Borussia Mönchengladbach and SC Freiburg, among others. Hanke also earned 17 caps for the Germany national team between 2005 and 2007 and was in the teams that finished third at the 2005 Confederations Cup and 2006 World Cup on home soil.

== Club career ==
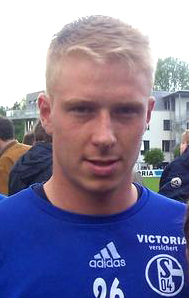
Hanke with Schalke 04

Hanke was born in Hamm. He made his debut in the 2001–02 season of the German Bundesliga for Schalke 04. He was transferred to VfL Wolfsburg during the 2005–06 season upon request by then Wolfsburg manager Thomas Strunz.

In May 2007, Hanke moved to Hannover 96, and netted eleven league goals, while the side achieved a midtable final position.

After three and a half seasons with Hannover 96, he transferred to Borussia Mönchengladbach.

On 31 May 2013, Hanke joined SC Freiburg on a free transfer. He said "It's a great package here in Freiburg. I had spoken to Christian Streich beforehand and got to know the place, and I think I'll fit in well here, the opportunity to play in Europe again certainly attracted me, but I also see it as my duty to help the younger players achieve their potential.'

On 8 July 2014, Hanke transferred to Chinese Super League side Guizhou Renhe. After half a year, he returned to Germany.

== International career ==
Hanke was first capped for the Germany national team on 8 June 2005 in a 2–2 friendly draw against Russia in Mönchengladbach. He replaced Gerald Asamoah after 62 minutes. In his second game, on 18 June against Tunisia in the group stage of the 2005 FIFA Confederations Cup, he came on for Lukas Podolski in the 87th minute. One minute later, he scored his only international goal, the last one in a 3–0 victory. He made his first start in the third-place play-off against Mexico on 29 June, but was sent off in the 53rd minute.

He was a member of the German squad for the 2006 FIFA World Cup, but missed the first two group stage matches due to the red card received in the Confederations Cup. He appeared as a substitute in Germany's 3–1 win over Portugal in the third-place play-off, replacing Lukas Podolski after 71 minutes.

Hanke appeared in three of Germany's qualifiers for Euro 2008, earning the last of 12 caps on 17 November 2007 in a 4–0 home win over Cyprus.

== Personal life ==
Hanke is allergic to grass. He gets blisters and sore skin from contact with grass.

== Career statistics ==
=== Club ===
Appearances and goals by club, season and competition
Club	Season	League			Cup		Continental		Other		Total	
Club	Season	Division	Apps	Goals	Apps	Goals	Apps	Goals	Apps	Goals	Apps	Goals
Schalke 04	2001–02	Bundesliga	1	0	0	0	0	0	—		1	0
Schalke 04	2002–03	Bundesliga	9	0	1	0	3 (Note: Appearances in the UEFA Cup)	2	—		13	2
Schalke 04	2003–04	Bundesliga	23	2	2	0	6 (Note: Appearances in the UEFA Intertoto Cup and UEFA Cup)	4	—		31	6
Schalke 04	2004–05	Bundesliga	25	5	5	4	12	6	—		42	15
Schalke 04	Total		58	7	8	4	21	12	0	0	87	23
VfL Wolfsburg	2005–06	Bundesliga	31	8	2	1	4 (Note: Appearances in the UEFA Intertoto Cup)	0	—		37	9
VfL Wolfsburg	2006–07	Bundesliga	22	8	2	1	—		—		24	9
VfL Wolfsburg	Total		53	16	4	2	4	0	0	0	61	18
Hannover 96	2007–08	Bundesliga	31	10	2	1	—		—		33	11
Hannover 96	2008–09	Bundesliga	25	4	2	1	—		—		27	5
Hannover 96	2009–10	Bundesliga	18	2	1	0	—		—		19	2
Hannover 96	2010–11	Bundesliga	7	3	1	0	—		—		8	3
Hannover 96	Total		81	19	6	2	0	0	0	0	87	21
Borussia Mönchengladbach	2010–11	Bundesliga	14	1	0	0	—		2 (Note: Appearances in the Relegation playoff)	0	16	1
Borussia Mönchengladbach	2011–12	Bundesliga	31	8	5	0	—		—		36	8
Borussia Mönchengladbach	2012–13	Bundesliga	32	4	2	0	9 (Note: Appearances in the UEFA Champions League and UEFA Europa League)	2	—		43	6
Borussia Mönchengladbach	Total		77	13	7	0	9	2	2	0	100	15
SC Freiburg	2013–14	Bundesliga	15	2	3	1	4 (Note: Appearances in the UEFA Europa League)	0	—		22	3
Beijing Renhe	2014	Chinese Super League	12	1	0	0	—		—		12	1
Career total			296	58	28	9	38	14	2	0	364	81

=== International ===
As of match played 17 November 2007.

Appearances and goals by national team and year
National team	Year	Apps	Goals
Germany	2005	6	1
Germany	2006	4	0
Germany	2007	2	0
Total		12	1

Scores and results list Germany's goal tally first, score column indicates score after each Hanke goal.

List of international goals scored by Mike Hanke
No.	Date	Venue	Cap	Opponent	Score	Result	Competition	Ref.
1	18 June 2005	RheinEnergieStadion, Cologne, Germany	2	Tunisia	3–0	3–0	2005 FIFA Confederations Cup	

== Honours ==
Schalke 04

- DFB-Pokal: 2001–02
- UEFA Intertoto Cup: 2003, 2004

Germany

- FIFA Confederations Cup third place: 2005
- FIFA World Cup third place: 2006

Individual

- Silbernes Lorbeerblatt: 2006
