= Cícero (footballer) =

Brazilian footballer (born 1984)

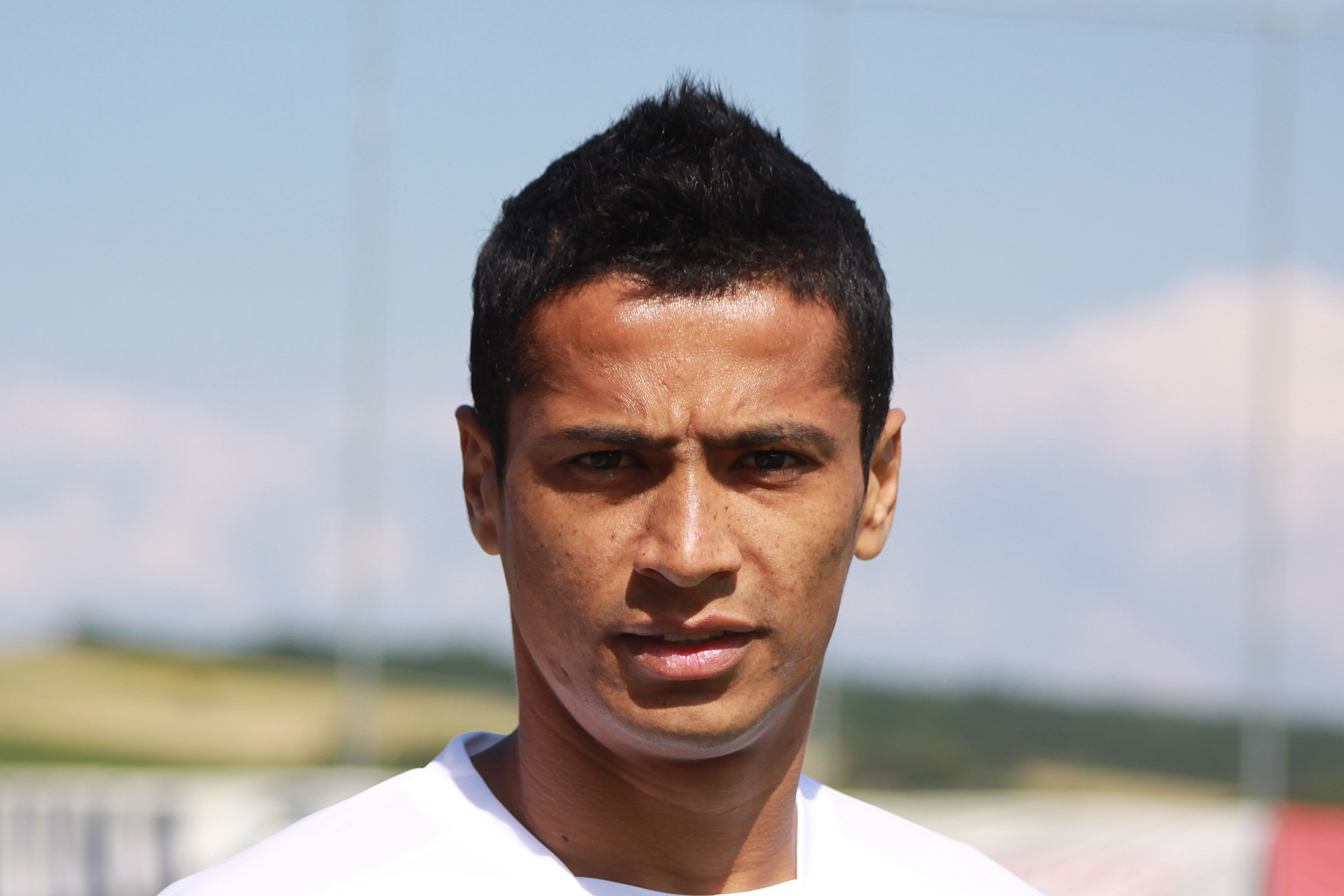
- Cícero in 2009

Personal information
- Full name: Cícero Santos
- Date of birth: 26 August 1984 (age 42)
- Place of birth: Castelo, Brazil
- Height: 1.80 m (5 ft 11 in)
- Position: Midfielder

Youth career
- 2000–2004: Tombense
- 2001–2004: → Bahia (loan)

Senior career*
Years	Team	Apps	(Gls)
2004–2008	Tombense	0	(0)
2004–2005	→ Bahia (loan)	48	(13)
2006	→ Figueirense (loan)	34	(13)
2007–2008	→ Fluminense (loan)	70	(16)
2008–2010	Hertha BSC	83	(11)
2010–2011	VfL Wolfsburg	24	(2)
2011–2012	São Paulo	92	(16)
2013–2014	Santos	88	(35)
2014–2016	Fluminense	110	(29)
2015	→ Al-Gharafa (loan)	9	(3)
2017	São Paulo	30	(4)
2017–2018	Grêmio	51	(7)
2019–2021	Botafogo	63	(6)
- * Club domestic league appearances and goals

Cícero Santos (born 26 August 1984), simply known as Cícero, is a former Brazilian professional footballer who played as a central or attacking midfielder.

== Career ==
=== Early career ===
During his time at Fluminense, Cícero proved himself to be a versatile player. He featured as an attacking midfielder, a defensive midfielder, a wide player and a striker. Cícero featured heavily in Fluminense's Copa Libertadores Campaign of 2008, scoring vital goals in the group stages, including a beautiful free kick in the 6–0 demolition of Arsenal de Sarandí at the Maracaña in Rio de Janeiro. Cícero was the only Flu player to convert his penalty kick during the shoot out in the final defeat against LDU Quito of Ecuador.

=== Hertha BSC ===
Cicero made his Bundesliga debut for Hertha on 17 August 2008 against Eintracht Frankfurt. He established himself as a regular, playing all but one game in the 2008–09 season.

=== São Paulo ===
After one and half-year playing for São Paulo, on 1 January 2013, Brazilian press confirmed that Cícero would break his contract with the club for 2013 season.

=== Santos ===
On 8 January 2013, Cícero signed a two-year deal with Santos. Cícero finished the 2013 Campeonato Paulista as the club's second topscorer, only behind Neymar.

=== Fluminense ===
In July 2014, Cícero re-joined Fluminense for his third spell at the club.

=== Return to São Paulo ===
In December 2016, Cícero has returned to São Paulo. After Cícero scored a hat-trick against PSTC, in a 4–2 winning match valid for 2017 Copa do Brasil, coach Rogério Ceni praised him as a key player of squad. According to Ceni: "He is a 32-year-old player, that adds experience, with a good head game and a good finalization from out of area."

=== Grêmio ===
After the sacking of São Paulo manager Rogerio Ceni, Cícero received less playtime, eventually leading to a mutual contract termination. He soon after signed with Grêmio in order to bolster their squad for continental play. Cícero scored the only goal of the 2017 Copa Libertadores finals first leg after coming off of the bench. He would come off the bench in the second leg as Grêmio won 3-1 on aggregate over Lanús.

=== Botafogo ===
In February 2019, Cícero joined Botafogo on a free transfer.

== Career statistics ==
As of 8 November 2023

Appearances and goals by club, season and competition
Club	Season	League			State League		Cup		Continental		Other		Total	
Club	Season	Division	Apps	Goals	Apps	Goals	Apps	Goals	Apps	Goals	Apps	Goals	Apps	Goals
Bahia	2003	Série A	8	1	—		—		—		—		8	1
Bahia	2004	Série B	25	7	4	0	—		—		—		29	7
Bahia	2005	Série B	15	5	12	0	2	0	—		—		29	5
Bahia	Total		48	13	16	0	2	0	—		—		66	13
Figueirense	2006	Série A	34	13	19	10	—		—		—		53	23
Fluminense	2007	Série A	27	6	11	4	11	2	—		—		49	12
Fluminense	2008	Série A	4	0	17	4	—		14 (Note: Appearance(s) in Copa Libertadores)	3	—		35	7
Fluminense	Total		31	6	28	8	11	2	14	3	—		84	19
Hertha BSC	2008–09	Bundesliga	33	7	—		2	0	8 (Note: Appearance(s) in UEFA Cup)	1	—		43	8
Hertha BSC	2009–10	Bundesliga	30	3	—		2	0	7 (Note: Appearance(s) in UEFA Europa League)	0	—		39	3
Hertha BSC	Total		63	10	—		4	0	15	1	—		82	11
VfL Wolfsburg	2010–11	Bundesliga	21	1	—		3	1	—		—		24	2
São Paulo	2011	Série A	27	6	—		—		4 (Note: Appearance(s) in Copa Sudamericana)	1	—		31	7
São Paulo	2012	Série A	30	3	20	5	9	1	2	0	—		61	9
São Paulo	Total		57	9	20	5	9	1	6	1	—		92	16
Santos	2013	Série A	37	15	22	9	7	0	—		—		66	24
Santos	2014	Série A	2	0	16	9	0	0	—		—		18	9
Santos	Total		39	15	38	18	7	0	—		—		84	33
Fluminense	2014	Série A	20	6	—		2	3	2	0	—		24	9
Fluminense	2015	Série A	19	3	0	0	6	1	—		—		25	4
Fluminense	2016	Série A	35	9	19	6	7	1	—		—		61	16
Fluminense	Total		74	18	19	6	15	5	2	0	—		110	29
Al-Gharafa	2014–15	Qatar Stars League	9	3	—		—		—		—		9	3
São Paulo	2017	Série A	10	0	14	1	6	3	—		—		30	4
Grêmio	2017	Série A	0	0	—		—		4	1	—		4	1
Grêmio	2018	Série A	24	2	7	1	2	0	11	3	2 (Note: Appearance(s) in Recopa Sudamericana)	0	46	6
Grêmio	Total		24	2	7	1	2	0	15	4	2	0	50	7
Botafogo	2019	Série A	32	3	5	0	3	1	4	1	—		44	5
Botafogo	2020	Série A	9	0	7	1	3	0	—		—		19	1
Botafogo	Total		41	3	12	1	6	1	4	1	—		63	6
Career total			427	91	175	50	63	13	45	8	2	0	712	162

== Honours ==
Figueirense

- Campeonato Catarinense: 2006

Fluminense

- Copa do Brasil: 2007
- Primeira Liga: 2016

São Paulo

- Copa Sudamericana: 2012

Grêmio

- Copa Libertadores: 2017
- Recopa Sudamericana: 2018
