= Daniel Reiche =

German footballer (born 1988)

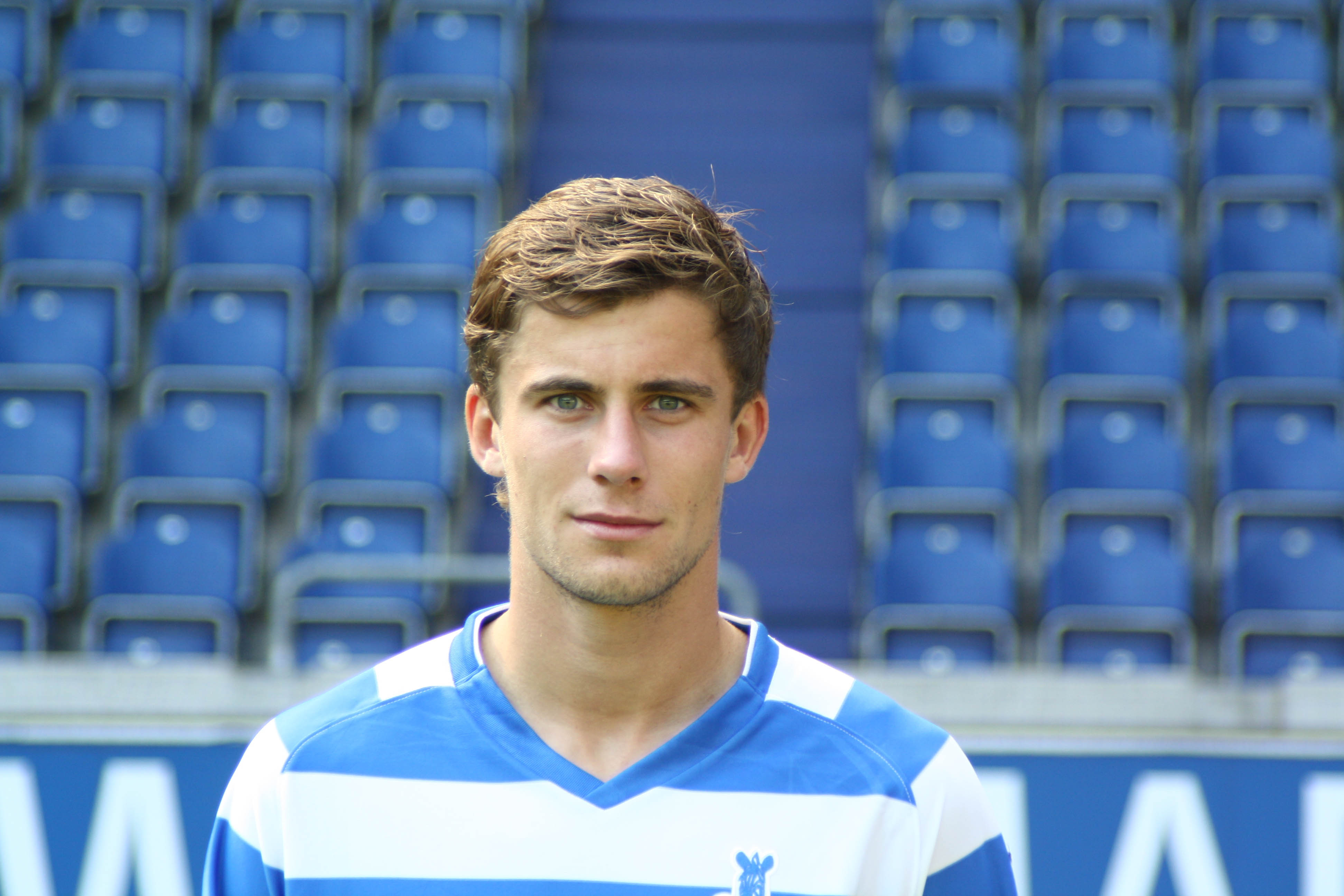
- Reiche in 2011

Personal information
- Date of birth: 14 March 1988 (age 38)
- Place of birth: Braunschweig, West Germany
- Height: 1.86 m (6 ft 1 in)
- Position: Centre-back

Team information
- Current team: FSV Schöningen
- Number: 30

Youth career
- FC Wenden
- Helmstedter SV
- TSV Grasleben
- 2003–2006: VfL Wolfsburg

Senior career*
Years	Team	Apps	(Gls)
2006–2010	VfL Wolfsburg II	127	(2)
2007–2010	VfL Wolfsburg	1	(0)
2010–2012	MSV Duisburg	17	(0)
2012–2013	SV Babelsberg 03	37	(2)
2013–2019	Viktoria Köln	164	(7)
2019–	FSV Schöningen	147	(21)
- * Club domestic league appearances and goals as of 20 June 2026

Daniel Reiche (born 14 March 1988) is a German footballer who plays as a centre-back for FSV Schöningen.

== Career ==
Reiche was born in Braunschweig. He made his Bundesliga debut for VfL Wolfsburg on 13 September 2008 in a game against Hertha BSC. He was substituted on for Christian Gentner in the 70th minute.

== Honours ==
- Bundesliga: 2008–09
