= Pablo Thiam =

Guinean footballer

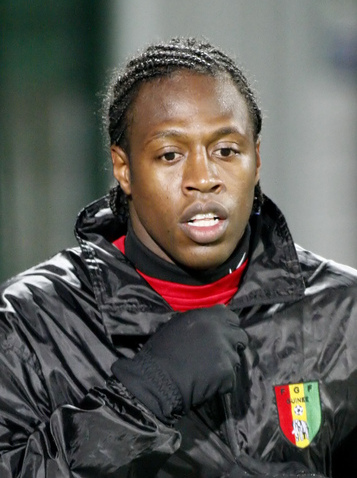
- Thiam in 2007

Personal information
- Full name: Pablo Thiam
- Date of birth: 3 January 1974 (age 52)
- Place of birth: Conakry, Guinea
- Height: 1.86 m (6 ft 1 in)
- Position: Defensive midfielder

Youth career
- –1989: MSV Bonn
- 1989–1994: 1. FC Köln

Senior career*
Years	Team	Apps	(Gls)
1994–1998	1. FC Köln	89	(4)
1998–2001	VfB Stuttgart	89	(9)
2001–2003	FC Bayern Munich	16	(0)
2003–2008	VfL Wolfsburg	117	(10)
Total		311	(23)

International career
1994–2007	Guinea	31	(1)
- * Club domestic league appearances and goals

Pablo Thiam (born 3 January 1974) is a Guinean former professional footballer who played as a defensive midfielder. He holds a German passport.

== Club career ==
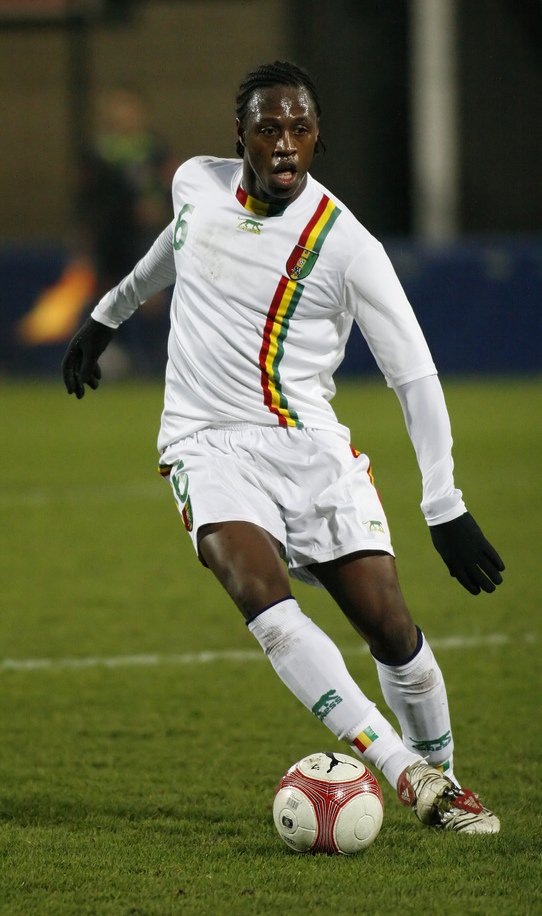
Thiam playing for the Guinea national team

Born in Conakry, Thiam grew up as the son of a Guinean diplomat and former national team player named Ousmane Tolo Thiam in the former West Germany capital Bonn. He started his football career in MSV Bonn. At the age of 15, he went to 1. FC Köln, for whom he debuted in the Bundesliga in 1994.

After a successful spell with Stuttgart, Thiam earned a move to Bayern Munich in 2001. However, he had a hard time getting first-team football at his new club. In January 2003, he was transferred to Wolfsburg, where he ended his career and started his new job as assistant of the management of VfL Wolfsburg. In July 2009 his role was changed and he became sports director of the second team.

== International career ==
Thiam was capped 31 times and scored one goal for the Guinea national team.

== Honours ==
Stuttgart

- UEFA Intertoto Cup: 2000
- DFB Liga-Pokal runner-up: 1998

Bayern Munich

- Intercontinental Cup: 2001
