= Karsten Fischer =

German footballer

Personal information
- Date of birth: 27 May 1984 (age 42)
- Place of birth: Norden, West Germany
- Height: 1.86 m (6 ft 1 in)
- Position: Midfielder

Youth career
- SpVg Aurich
- SuS Berumerfehn
- SVG Einbeck

Senior career*
Years	Team	Apps	(Gls)
2002–2003	VfL Wolfsburg II		
2003–2006	VfL Wolfsburg	20	(0)
2007–2009	SC Paderborn	39	(3)
2009–2010	Wuppertaler SV	36	(4)
2010–2012	Holstein Kiel	47	(5)
2012–2016	Goslarer SC 08	126	(17)
2016–2017	Eintracht Northeim	24	(2)
2017–2018	MTV Gifhorn	13	(0)

International career
	Germany U-21	2	(0)
- * Club domestic league appearances and goals

Karsten Fischer (born 27 May 1984) is a German former professional footballer who played as a midfielder.

== Career ==
Fischer was born in Norden. He spent four seasons in the Bundesliga with VfL Wolfsburg. In summer 2007, Fischer joined SC Paderborn and left after two years in June 2009 for Wuppertaler SV.
