= Christian Gentner =

German footballer

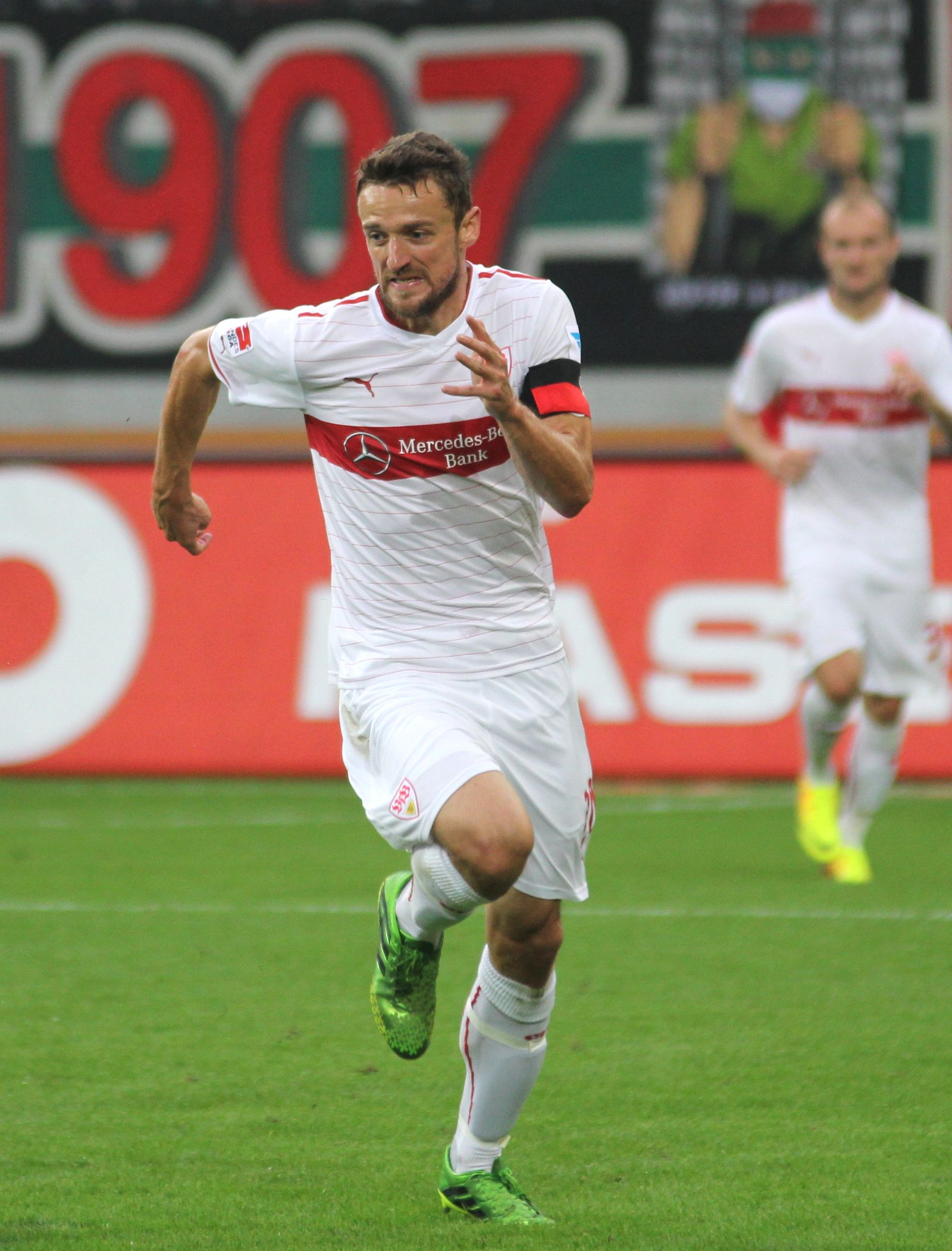
- Gentner with VfB Stuttgart in 2013

Personal information
- Date of birth: 14 August 1985 (age 41)
- Place of birth: Nürtingen, West Germany
- Height: 1.89 m (6 ft 2 in)
- Position: Midfielder

Youth career
- 1988–1998: TSV Beuren
- 1998–1999: VfL Kirchheim
- 1999–2004: VfB Stuttgart

Senior career*
Years	Team	Apps	(Gls)
2004–2007	VfB Stuttgart II	30	(6)
2004–2007	VfB Stuttgart	39	(1)
2007–2010	VfL Wolfsburg	99	(11)
2010–2019	VfB Stuttgart	273	(37)
2019–2021	Union Berlin	53	(3)
2021–2022	FC Luzern	43	(1)

International career
2004–2006	Germany U20	14	(3)
2009–2010	Germany	5	(0)
- * Club domestic league appearances and goals

Christian Gentner (born 14 August 1985) is a German professional football official and a former player who played as a midfielder. He works as a head of the professional player department at VfB Stuttgart. He won the Bundesliga twice, with VfB Stuttgart in 2007 and VfL Wolfsburg in 2009. He was also called up five times to the senior Germany national team.

== Club career ==
Before joining VfB Stuttgart, Gentner played at TSV Beuren and VfL Kirchheim.

In the 2004–05 season, he played 28 times and scored six times for the Regionalliga (third division) team of VfB Stuttgart. In the same season, he had his Bundesliga debut against Hertha BSC on 20 February 2005 (1–0). He scored his first goal in a UEFA Cup game against Domžale on 25 September 2005.

In 2006, Gentner's contract in Stuttgart was extended until 2010.

On 18 July 2007, he was loaned to VfL Wolfsburg until summer 2009 and on 11 August 2008 Gentner signed a permanent deal with Wolfsburg.

On 8 January 2010, Gentner announced that he would be joining VfB Stuttgart at the end of the season. After seeing out his contract with the Wolves which ended on 1 July 2010, Gentner returned to Stuttgart on a free transfer.

On 6 January 2013, Gentner extended his contract with VfB Stuttgart until June 2016 with an option for a further year. Following Serdar Tasci's departure to Spartak Moscow, it was announced that Gentner is to be his successor as the new club captain. In May 2016 Gentner extended his contract with VfB Stuttgart until June 2019.

On 5 July 2019, Gentner signed a contract with club Union Berlin.

In September 2022, Gentner announced that he would retire from playing at the end of 2022. At the same time, VfB Stuttgart announced that he would join the club on 1 January 2023 as head of the professional player department.

== International career ==
On 19 May 2009, Gentner was called up to the senior Germany national team for their tour of Asia. He made his début against China on 29 May 2009. Until August 2010 he won five caps in total.

== Personal life ==
His brother Thomas Gentner plays for TuS Koblenz.

On 15 December 2018, Gentner's father died at Stuttgart's stadium, just after Stuttgart had beaten Hertha BSC 2–1.

== Career statistics ==
As of match played on 1 July 2021

Appearances and goals by club, season and competition
Club	Season	League			Cup (Note: Appearances in the DFB-Pokal.)		Continental		Other		Total	
Club	Season	Division	Apps	Goals	Apps	Goals	Apps	Goals	Apps	Goals	Apps	Goals
VfB Stuttgart II	2004–05	Regionalliga Süd	28	6	—		—		—		28	6
VfB Stuttgart II	2006–07	Regionalliga Süd	2	0	—		—		—		2	0
VfB Stuttgart II	Total		30	6	—		—		—		30	6
VfB Stuttgart	2004–05	Bundesliga	1	0	0	0	1 (Note: Appearances in the UEFA Cup.)	0	—		2	0
VfB Stuttgart	2005–06	Bundesliga	23	1	2	0	6	1	2 (Note: Appearances in the German League Cup.)	0	33	2
VfB Stuttgart	2006–07	Bundesliga	15	0	1	0	—		—		16	0
VfB Stuttgart	Total		39	1	3	0	7	1	2	0	51	2
VfL Wolfsburg	2007–08	Bundesliga	31	3	5	1	—		—		36	4
VfL Wolfsburg	2008–09	Bundesliga	34	4	3	1	8	1	—		45	6
VfL Wolfsburg	2009–10	Bundesliga	34	4	2	0	12 (Note: Appearances in the UEFA Champions League and UEFA Europa League.)	3	—		48	7
VfL Wolfsburg	Total		99	11	10	2	20	4	—		129	17
VfB Stuttgart	2010–11	Bundesliga	31	5	2	0	9 (Note: Appearances in the UEFA Europa League.)	3	—		42	8
VfB Stuttgart	2011–12	Bundesliga	28	5	4	0	—		—		32	5
VfB Stuttgart	2012–13	Bundesliga	34	5	6	2	12	2	—		52	9
VfB Stuttgart	2013–14	Bundesliga	28	4	2	0	3	1	—		33	5
VfB Stuttgart	2014–15	Bundesliga	33	5	1	0	—		—		34	5
VfB Stuttgart	2015–16	Bundesliga	29	5	3	0	—		—		32	5
VfB Stuttgart	2016–17	2. Bundesliga	34	6	2	1	—		—		36	7
VfB Stuttgart	2017–18	Bundesliga	27	2	2	1	—		—		29	3
VfB Stuttgart	2018–19	Bundesliga	29	0	1	0	—		2 (Note: Appearances in the Bundesliga relegation play-offs)	1	32	1
VfB Stuttgart	Total		273	37	23	4	24	6	2	1	322	48
Union Berlin	2019–20	Bundesliga	31	3	3	1	—		—		34	4
Union Berlin	2020–21	Bundesliga	22	0	1	0	—		—		23	0
Union Berlin	Total		53	3	4	1	0	0	0	0	57	4
Career total			494	58	40	7	51	11	4	1	589	77

== Honours ==
VfB Stuttgart

- Bundesliga: 2006–07
- 2. Bundesliga: 2016–17

VfL Wolfsburg

- Bundesliga: 2008–09

Individual

- Bundesliga Goal of the Month: August 2013
