= Josué (footballer, born 1979) =

Brazilian footballer

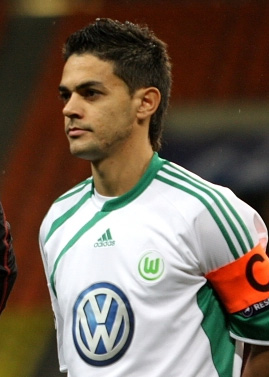
- Josué captaining VfL Wolfsburg in the 2009–10 UEFA Champions League

Personal information
- Full name: Josué Anunciado de Oliveira
- Date of birth: 19 July 1979 (age 47)
- Place of birth: Vitória de Santo Antão, Brazil
- Height: 1.69 m (5 ft 7 in)
- Position: Defensive midfielder

Youth career
- 1995–1996: Goiás

Senior career*
Years	Team	Apps	(Gls)
1997–2004	Goiás	190	(6)
2005–2007	São Paulo	61	(1)
2007–2013	VfL Wolfsburg	164	(2)
2013–2015	Atlético Mineiro	62	(1)
Total		477	(10)

International career
1999	Brazil U23	1	(0)
2007–2010	Brazil	28	(1)
Medal record
Men's football
Representing Brazil
Copa América
Winner	2007 Venezuela
- * Club domestic league appearances and goals

Josué Anunciado de Oliveira (born 19 July 1979), known as simply Josué, is a Brazilian former professional footballer who played as a defensive midfielder. He played for the Brazil national team from 2007 to 2010, winning the 2007 Copa América and playing at the 2010 FIFA World Cup.

== Club career ==
Josué started his career in Goiás before moving on to São Paulo in 2005. He won the Brazilian League, Copa Libertadores and FIFA Club World Cup during his stint at São Paulo. A resilient defensive midfielder, he helped the club claim Brazilian League gold in 2006 and 2007.

He then joined VfL Wolfsburg in August 2007 and captained the team that won the 2008–09 Bundesliga, their first league title. As a result, they played in the 2009–10 UEFA Champions League.

In March 2013, Josúe transferred to Atlético Mineiro on a free transfer after five years at Wolfsburg. On 31 March 2013, in his debut match, he scored his first goal for Atlético in a 4–1 victory over Tupi in the Minas Gerais State Championship.

== International career ==
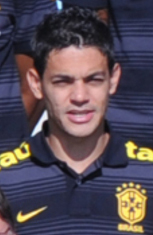
Josué with Brazil in 2010

Josué made his international debut on 27 March 2007 in a friendly match against Ghana. He was part of the Brazil squad that won the 2007 Copa América. His first international goal came during the tournament in a match against Chile, which Brazil went on to win 6–1.

== Career statistics ==
=== Club ===
As of 8 December 2014

Club	Season	League		Cup		Continental		State League		Total	
Club	Season	Apps	Goals	Apps	Goals	Apps	Goals	Apps	Goals	Apps	Goals
Goiás	1997	4	0	0	0	0	0	5	0	9	0
Goiás	1998	21	0	0	0	0	0	4	0	25	0
Goiás	1999	0	0	0	0	0	0	10	0	10	0
Goiás	2000	22	2	0	0	0	0	10	0	32	2
Goiás	2001	20	0	0	0	0	0	10	0	30	0
Goiás	2002	23	1	0	0	0	0	10	0	33	1
Goiás	2003	42	1	0	0	0	0	10	1	52	3
Goiás	2004	41	1	0	0	0	0	10	0	51	1
Goiás	Total	173	5	0	0	0	0	0	0	242	7
São Paulo	2005	31	1	0	0	15	0	15	4	61	5
São Paulo	2006	30	0	0	0	15	0	18	1	63	1
São Paulo	2007	11	0	0	0	8	0	15	1	34	1
São Paulo	Total	72	1	0	0	38	0	48	6	158	7
VfL Wolfsburg	2007–08	30	1	0	0	0	0	-	-	30	1
VfL Wolfsburg	2008–09	33	0	0	0	7	0	-	-	40	0
VfL Wolfsburg	2009–10	31	1	2	0	12	0	-	-	45	1
VfL Wolfsburg	2010–11	26	0	3	1	0	0	-	-	29	1
VfL Wolfsburg	2011–12	28	0	1	0	0	0	-	-	29	0
VfL Wolfsburg	2012–13	16	0	3	0	0	0	-	-	19	0
VfL Wolfsburg	Total	164	2	9	1	19	0	0	0	192	3
Atlético Mineiro	2013	31	0	1	0	10	0	6	2	48	2
Atlético Mineiro	2014	23	1	6	0	4	1	7	1	40	3
Atlético Mineiro	Total	54	1	7	0	14	1	13	3	88	5
Career Total		463	9	16	1	71	1	61	9	679	23

=== International ===
As of 2 July 2010

National team	Club	Season	Apps	Goals
Brazil	São Paulo	2007	7	1
Brazil	Wolfsburg	2007–2008	9	0
Brazil	Wolfsburg	2008–2009	9	0
Brazil	Wolfsburg	2009–2010	3	0
Total			28	1

=== International goals ===
As of match played 2 July 2010 (Brazil score listed first, score column indicates score after each Josué goal)

No.	Date	Venue	Opponent	Score	Result	Competition
1.	7 July 2007	Estadio Olímpico Luis Ramos, Puerto la Cruz, Venezuela	Chile	5–0	6–1	2007 Copa América

== Honours ==
=== Club ===
Goiás

- Campeonato Goiano: 1997, 1998, 1999, 2000, 2002, 2003
- Campeonato Brasileiro Série B: 1999
- Copa Centro-Oeste: 2000, 2001, 2002

São Paulo

- Campeonato Paulista: 2005
- Copa Libertadores: 2005
- FIFA Club World Cup: 2005
- Campeonato Brasileiro Série A: 2006, 2007

Wolfsburg

- Bundesliga: 2008–09

Atlético Mineiro

- Campeonato Mineiro: 2013, 2015
- Copa Libertadores: 2013
- Recopa Sudamericana: 2014
- Copa do Brasil: 2014

=== International ===
Brazil

- Copa América: 2007
- Confederations Cup: 2009

Sporting positions
Preceded by Marcelinho Paraíba	VfL Wolfsburg captain 2008–2013	Succeeded by Diego Benaglio
