= Jonathan Santana =

Argentine-born Paraguayan footballer (born 1981)

Personal information
- Full name: Jonathan Santana Gehre
- Date of birth: 19 October 1981 (age 45)
- Place of birth: Buenos Aires, Argentina
- Height: 1.82 m (6 ft 0 in)
- Position: Midfielder

Senior career*
Years	Team	Apps	(Gls)
1998–2000	San Telmo	35	(3)
2000–2001	Almagro	14	(0)
2001	San Lorenzo	3	(0)
2002–2003	Nueva Chicago	33	(3)
2003–2005	San Lorenzo	62	(3)
2005–2006	River Plate	24	(4)
2006–2010	VfL Wolfsburg	41	(1)
2009	→ San Lorenzo (loan)	10	(2)
2010–2012	Kayserispor	35	(4)
2012	Libertad	15	(2)
2012–2013	Independiente	15	(2)
2013	Belgrano de Córdoba	2	(0)
2014–2016	Cerro Porteño	53	(2)
2016–2017	Sarmiento	9	(1)
2017–2018	Nacional Asunción	4	(0)
2018–2019	Sportivo Luqueño		
2020	Sportivo Trinidense		

International career
2007–2016	Paraguay	34	(1)
Medal record
Representing Paraguay
Copa América
Runner-up	2011 Argentina	Team
- * Club domestic league appearances and goals

Jonathan Santana Gehre (born 19 October 1981) is an Argentina-born Paraguayan former football midfielder and current model. He played for the Paraguay national team from 2007 to 2016. Santana was a key part of Paraguay's national team whilst under management of Tata Martino, featuring in three major competitions, the 2007 Copa América, the 2010 FIFA World Cup and the 2011 Copa América. Santana missed the final of the latter due to a red card in the semi-final against Venezuela. Santana's career ran from 1998 to 2020, playing in Argentina, Germany, Turkey and Paraguay. In 2021, Santana retired as a footballer and became a model.

== Club career ==
Santana's debut was in the 1998–99 season in Argentina's lower leagues, appearing in the squad with Japanese defender Shinji Muraki. He went on to play for a number of Argentine Primera clubs, including San Lorenzo and River Plate.

=== San Lorenzo ===
For the 2001–02 season, Santana joined San Lorenzo de Almagro for the 2002 Copa Libertadores and Copa Sudamericana tournaments, winning the latter and forming the squad with Cameroon midfielder William Tabi. In the 2004–05 season, Santana appeared for San Lorenzo in the Copa Libertadores in the squad with Ezequiel Lavezzi.

=== River Plate ===
For the 2005–06 season, Santana joined Argentine River Plate, reaching the quarter-final stages of the Copa Libertadores. Santana formed part of a high-profile team that included Juan Pablo Carrizo, German Lux, Diego Buonanotte, Marcelo Gallardo, Daniel Montenegro, Oscar Ahumada, Matias Abelairas, Luciano Figueroa, Gaston Fernandez, Gonzalo Higuaín, Colombian striker Radamel Falcao and future Paraguay national team colleague Julio Cesar Caceres.

=== Wolfsburg ===
In August 2006, he signed a five-year contract with German VfL Wolfsburg. Whilst Santana was at Wolfsburg during the 2006–07 season, he formed part of the team with Paraguayan Julio dos Santos. For his second season at the club, Santana was teammates with Edin Dzeko.

==== San Lorenzo (loan) ====
During a loan move to San Lorenzo in the 2008–09 Argentine Primera División season, he joined Paraguayan Aureliano Torres in the squad.

Santana returned to Wolfsburg for the 2009–10 season, where the team participated in the UEFA Champions League and the UEFA Europa League.

=== Kayserispor ===
Following the 2010 FIFA World Cup, Santana joined Turkish Super Lig team Kayserispor, partnering up with Marcelo Zalayeta, Franco Cangele, Ali Bilgin, Önder Turaci, Mehmet Boyraz and James Troisi in his first season at the club. Santa made 20 league appearances and scored four goals in his first season at the club, which saw Kayserispor finish in sixth position in the Super Lig table. In Santana's second season at the club, he amassed 15 league appearances before being loaned out to Primera División Paraguaya team Libertad for the 2012 season. Prior to his loan move, he was joined at Kayserispor by national team colleague Cristian Riveros.

=== Cerro Porteño ===
Santana debuted for Cerro Porteño in a 3–1 away victory against Club 12 de Octubre on 16 February 2014. Santana was substituted onto the field for Fidencio Oviedo in the 83rd minute of the match.

== International career ==
In June 2007, Santana received Paraguayan citizenship (his mother is a Paraguayan citizen born in San Ignacio, Misiones Department and Argentina did not recognize dual citizenship). He played for Paraguay in the 2007 Copa América. He was also named in Paraguay's final 23-men squad for the 2010 FIFA World Cup. He entered the field during Paraguay's first game, a 1–1 draw with Italy, but suffered an injury during the match. However, as Paraguay's coach Gerardo Martino had already made the three available substitutions, Santana had to stay on the field and play injured for the remaining time.

== Modeling career ==
Following his retirement from football in 2021, Santana and his wife modelled for a clothes store at Asunción shopping centre Paseo la Galeria.

== Career statistics ==
Club	Season	League		Cup		League Cup		Continental		Total	
Club	Season	Apps	Goals	Apps	Goals	Apps	Goals	Apps	Goals	Apps	Goals
Cerro Porteño	2014	9	0	–	–	–	–	1	0	10	0
Career total		–	–	–	–	–	–	–	–	–	–

== Honours ==
San Lorenzo

- Copa Mercosur: 2001

VfL Wolfsburg

- Bundesliga: 2008–09
