= Alexander Madlung =

German footballer (born 1982)

Personal information
- Date of birth: 11 July 1982 (age 44)
- Place of birth: Braunschweig, West Germany
- Height: 1.93 m (6 ft 4 in)
- Position: Centre back

Youth career
- 1986–1994: Sportfreunde Ölper
- 1994–1997: Eintracht Braunschweig
- 1997–1998: VfL Wolfsburg
- 1999: Eintracht Braunschweig
- 1999–2001: Hertha BSC

Senior career*
Years	Team	Apps	(Gls)
2000–2006	Hertha BSC II	76	(17)
2002–2006	Hertha BSC	81	(11)
2006–2013	VfL Wolfsburg	166	(12)
2014–2015	Eintracht Frankfurt	38	(6)
2015–2017	Fortuna Düsseldorf	34	(0)
Total		395	(46)

International career
2003–2004	Germany U21	13	(1)
2004–2005	Germany Team 2006	3	(1)
2006–2007	Germany	2	(0)
- * Club domestic league appearances and goals

Alexander Madlung (born 11 July 1982) is a German former professional footballer who played as a centre back.

== Club career ==
Madlung started his career at Hertha BSC before moving to VfL Wolfsburg in 2006. On 2 January 2014, he signed a one-and-a-half-year contract with Bundesliga club Eintracht Frankfurt. In late October 2015, after being a free agent for several months, he signed a contract with 2. Bundesliga side Fortuna Düsseldorf valid until 2017. His career ended in 2017 and overall he played nearly 320 matches in the first and second division of the German league pyramid.

== International career ==
In 2006 and 2007 Madlung won two caps for the Germany national team.

== Honours ==
Hertha BSC

- DFB-Ligapokal: 2002

VfL Wolfsburg

- Bundesliga: 2008–09
