= Bulgaria national football team results (2000–2019) =

This is a list of the Bulgaria national football team results from 2000 to 2019:

== Results ==
Key
Win
Draw
Defeat

=== 2000 ===
9 February Valparaíso Tournament	Bulgaria	1–0	Slovakia	Valparaíso, Chile
	Chomakov 81'	Report		Stadium: Estadio Playa Ancha; Attendance: 3,000; Referee: Pablo Pozo (Chile)

12 February Valparaíso Tournament	Chile	3–2	Bulgaria	Valparaíso, Chile
	Acuña 31'; Coto 43'; Villarroel 83'	Report	Berbatov 44'; Stoilov 90'	Stadium: Estadio Playa Ancha; Attendance: 5,000; Referee: Braulio Arenas (Chile)

15 February Valparaíso Tournament	Australia	1–1	Bulgaria	Valparaíso, Chile
	Agostino 1'	Report	Ge. Ivanov 89'	Stadium: Estadio Playa Ancha; Attendance: 8,000; Referee: Rubén Selman (Chile)

29 March Friendly	Bulgaria	4–1	Belarus	Sofia, Bulgaria
	S. Todorov 23'; Donkov 42'; Petkov 61'; S. Petrov 80'	Report	Skripchenko 57'	Stadium: Georgi Asparuhov Stadium; Attendance: 2,000; Referee: Jozef Kačenga (Slovakia)

26 April Friendly	Bulgaria	0–1	Ukraine	Sofia, Bulgaria
		Report	Shevchenko 54'	Stadium: Georgi Asparuhov Stadium; Attendance: 1,500; Referee: Sašo Lazarevski (Macedonia)

16 August Friendly	Bulgaria	1–3	Belgium	Sofia, Bulgaria
	Iliev 65'	Report	Verheyen 16', 60'; Mpenza 29'	Stadium: Georgi Asparuhov Stadium; Attendance: 1,500; Referee: Kyros Vassaras (Greece)

2 September 2002 FIFA World Cup qualification	Bulgaria	0–1	Czech Republic	Sofia, Bulgaria
		Report	Poborský 73' (pen.)	Stadium: Georgi Asparuhov Stadium; Attendance: 8,000; Referee: Juan Fernández Marín (Spain)

7 October 2002 FIFA World Cup qualification	Bulgaria	3–0	Malta	Sofia, Bulgaria
	Ge. Ivanov 40', 65'; S. Todorov 90'	Report		Stadium: Georgi Asparuhov Stadium; Attendance: 3,000; Referee: Džemal Čalija (Bosnia and Herzegovina)

11 October 2002 FIFA World Cup qualification	Denmark	1–1	Bulgaria	Copenhagen, Denmark
	Sand 72'	Report	Berbatov 83'	Stadium: Parken Stadium; Attendance: 39,847; Referee: Oğuz Sarvan (Turkey)

14 November Friendly	Algeria	1–2	Bulgaria	Algiers, Algeria
	Madoui 50'	Report	M. Petrov 38'; Yovov 68'	Stadium: Stade du 5 Juillet 1962; Attendance: 10,000; Referee: Mourad Daami (Tunisia)

=== 2001 ===
24 January Friendly	Mexico	0–2	Bulgaria	Morelia, Mexico
		Report	S. Petrov 58'; Chomakov 90+2'	Stadium: Estadio Morelos; Attendance: 25,000; Referee: Kevin Stott (United States)

28 January Friendly	Jamaica	0–0	Bulgaria	Kingston, Jamaica
		Report		Stadium: The National Stadium; Attendance: 6,000; Referee: Carlos Batres (Guatemala)

28 February Friendly	Jordan	0–2	Bulgaria	Amman, Jordan
		Report	Chomakov 43'; S. Petrov 55'	Stadium: King Abdullah II Stadium; Attendance: 4,000; Referee: Abdul Omar (Jordan)

24 March 2002 FIFA World Cup qualification	Bulgaria	2–1	Iceland	Sofia, Bulgaria
	Chomakov 36'; Berbatov 79'	Report	Hreiðarsson 25'	Stadium: Bulgarian Army Stadium; Attendance: 14,500; Referee: Mike Riley (England)

28 March 2002 FIFA World Cup qualification	Bulgaria	4–3	Northern Ireland	Sofia, Bulgaria
	Balakov 7' (pen.); M. Petrov 17', 78'; Chomakov 72'	Report	Williams 15'; Elliott 84'; Healy 90' (pen.)	Stadium: Bulgarian Army Stadium; Attendance: 15,600; Referee: Vladimír Hriňák (Slovakia)

25 April Friendly	Norway	2–1	Bulgaria	Oslo, Norway
	Leonhardsen 75', 76'	Report	M. Hristov 1'	Stadium: Ullevaal Stadium; Attendance: 6,211; Referee: Jozef Kačenga (Slovakia)

2 June 2002 FIFA World Cup qualification	Northern Ireland	0–1	Bulgaria	Belfast, Northern Ireland
		Report	Ge. Ivanov 52'	Stadium: Windsor Park; Attendance: 7,609; Referee: Massimo Busacca (Switzerland)

6 June 2002 FIFA World Cup qualification	Iceland	1–1	Bulgaria	Reykjavík, Iceland
	Daðason 43'	Report	Berbatov 81'	Stadium: Laugardalsvöllur; Attendance: 4,316; Referee: Dermot Gallagher (England)

15 August Friendly	Bulgaria	1–0	Macedonia	Sofia, Bulgaria
	Balakov 49' (pen.)	Report		Stadium: Bulgarian Army Stadium; Attendance: 3,500; Referee: Spyros Papadakos (Greece)

1 September 2002 FIFA World Cup qualification	Malta	0–2	Bulgaria	Ta' Qali, Malta
		Report	Berbatov 74', 80'	Stadium: National Stadium; Attendance: 2,265; Referee: Hartmut Strampe (Germany)

5 September 2002 FIFA World Cup qualification	Bulgaria	0–2	Denmark	Sofia, Bulgaria
		Report	Tomasson 47', 90+1'	Stadium: Bulgarian Army Stadium; Attendance: 21,500; Referee: Jan Wegereef (Netherlands)

6 October 2002 FIFA World Cup qualification	Czech Republic	6–0	Bulgaria	Prague, Czech Republic
	Rosický 5', 69'; Nedvěd 16', 76'; Baroš 27'; Lokvenc 66'	Report		Stadium: Letná Stadium; Attendance: 15,020; Referee: Claude Colombo (France)

=== 2002 ===
13 February Friendly	Croatia	0–0	Bulgaria	Rijeka, Croatia
		Report		Stadium: Kantrida Stadium; Attendance: 4,169; Referee: Darko Čeferin (Slovenia)

27 March Friendly	Ecuador	3–0	Bulgaria	East Rutherford, United States
	Kaviedes 24', 82'; Tenorio 49'	Report		Stadium: Giants Stadium; Attendance: 34,511; Referee: Michael Kennedy (United States)

17 April Friendly	Mexico	1–0	Bulgaria	East Rutherford, United States
	de Anda 89'	Report		Stadium: Giants Stadium; Attendance: 42,591; Referee: Ali Saheli (United States)

21 August Friendly	Bulgaria	2–2	Germany	Sofia, Bulgaria
	Berbatov 21'; Balakov 50' (pen.)	Report	Ballack 23' (pen.); Jancker 57'	Stadium: Georgi Asparuhov Stadium; Attendance: 7,000; Referee: Stéphane Bré (France)

7 September UEFA Euro 2004 qualifying	Belgium	0–2	Bulgaria	Brussels, Belgium
20:00 UTC+2		Report	Janković 17'; S. Petrov 63'	Stadium: King Baudouin Stadium; Attendance: 25,000; Referee: Terje Hauge (Norway)

12 October UEFA Euro 2004 qualifying	Bulgaria	2–0	Croatia	Sofia, Bulgaria
18:00 UTC+3	S. Petrov 22'; Berbatov 37'	Report		Stadium: Vasil Levski National Stadium; Attendance: 43,200; Referee: Anders Frisk (Sweden)

16 October UEFA Euro 2004 qualifying	Bulgaria	2–1	Andorra	Sofia, Bulgaria
18:00 UTC+3	Chilikov 37'; Balakov 58'	Report	Lima 80'	Stadium: Vasil Levski National Stadium; Attendance: 36,000; Referee: Ceri Richards (Wales)

20 November Friendly	Spain	1–0	Bulgaria	Granada, Spain
	José Mari 10'	Report		Stadium: Estadio Nuevo Los Cármenes; Attendance: 16,000; Referee: Bruno Coué (France)

=== 2003 ===
27 March Friendly	Serbia and Montenegro	1–2	Bulgaria	Kruševac, Serbia and Montenegro
	Kovačević 29'	Report	S. Petrov 13'; S. Todorov 56'	Stadium: Mladost Stadium; Attendance: 10,000; Referee: Sašo Lazarevski (Macedonia)

2 April UEFA Euro 2004 qualifying	Estonia	0–0	Bulgaria	Tallinn, Estonia
18:00 UTC+3		Report		Stadium: A. Le Coq Arena; Attendance: 2,500; Referee: Konrad Plautz (Austria)

30 April Friendly	Bulgaria	2–0	Albania	Sofia, Bulgaria
	Berbatov 3', 34'	Report		Stadium: Vasil Levski National Stadium; Attendance: 7,523; Referee: Karel Vidlák (Czech Republic)

7 June UEFA Euro 2004 qualifying	Bulgaria	2–2	Belgium	Sofia, Bulgaria
19:15 UTC+3	Berbatov 52'; S. Todorov 71' (pen.)	Report	S. Petrov 30' (o.g.); Clement 55'	Stadium: Vasil Levski National Stadium; Attendance: 42,099; Referee: Pierluigi Collina (Italy)

20 August Friendly	Bulgaria	3–0	Lithuania	Sofia, Bulgaria
	V. Dimitrov 25' (pen.), 45'; Berbatov 33'	Report		Stadium: Vasil Levski National Stadium; Attendance: 2,000; Referee: Cosimo Bolognino (Italy)

6 September UEFA Euro 2004 qualifying	Bulgaria	2–0	Estonia	Sofia, Bulgaria
18:00 UTC+3	M. Petrov 16'; Berbatov 66'	Report		Stadium: Vasil Levski National Stadium; Attendance: 25,128; Referee: Franz-Xaver Wack (Germany)

10 September UEFA Euro 2004 qualifying	Andorra	0–3	Bulgaria	Andorra la Vella, Andorra
17:30 UTC+2		Report	Berbatov 11', 24'; M. Hristov 58'	Stadium: Estadi Comunal d'Aixovall; Attendance: 450; Referee: Tomasz Mikulski (Poland)

11 October UEFA Euro 2004 qualifying	Croatia	1–0	Bulgaria	Zagreb, Croatia
20:15 UTC+2	Olić 48'	Report		Stadium: Maksimir Stadium; Attendance: 31,363; Referee: Gilles Veissiere (France)

18 November Friendly	South Korea	0–1	Bulgaria	Seoul, South Korea
		Report	Manchev 19'	Stadium: Seoul World Cup Stadium; Attendance: 38,257; Referee: Subkhiddin Salleh (Malaysia)

=== 2004 ===
18 February Friendly	Greece	2–0	Bulgariа	Athens, Greece
	Papadopoulos 25'; Vryzas 59'	Report		Stadium: Leoforos Alexandras Stadium; Attendance: 6,000; Referee: Graham Poll (England)

31 March Friendly	Bulgariа	2–2	Russia	Sofia, Bulgaria
	Berbatov 16', 66'	Report	Sychev 9', 31'	Stadium: Vasil Levski National Stadium; Attendance: 14,938; Referee: Pedro Proença (Portugal)

28 April Friendly	Bulgariа	3–0	Cameroon	Sofia, Bulgaria
	Berbatov 7', 54' (pen.); Lazarov 56'	Report		Stadium: Vasil Levski National Stadium; Attendance: 13,987; Referee: Johan Verbist (Belgium)

2 June Friendly	Czech Republic	3–1	Bulgariа	Prague, Czech Republic
	Baroš 54'; Plašil 74'; Rosický 81'	Report	Petkov 90+4'	Stadium: Letná Stadium; Attendance: 6,627; Referee: Anton Stredák (Slovakia)

14 June UEFA Euro 2004 group stage	Sweden	5–0	Bulgariа	Lisbon, Portugal
19:45 UTC−1	Ljungberg 32'; Larsson 57', 58'; Ibrahimović 78' (pen.); Allbäck 90+1'	Report		Stadium: Estádio José Alvalade; Attendance: 31,652; Referee: Mike Riley (England)

18 June UEFA Euro 2004 group stage	Bulgariа	0–2	Denmark	Braga, Portugal
17:00 UTC−1		Report	Tomasson 48'; Grønkjær 90+2'	Stadium: Estádio Municipal de Braga; Attendance: 24,131; Referee: Lucílio Batista (Portugal)

22 June UEFA Euro 2004 group stage	Italy	2–1	Bulgariа	Guimarães, Portugal
19:45 UTC−1	Perrotta 48'; Cassano 90+4'	Report	M. Petrov 45' (pen.)	Stadium: Estádio D. Afonso Henriques; Attendance: 16,002; Referee: Valentin Ivanov (Russia)

18 August Friendly	Republic of Ireland	1–1	Bulgariа	Dublin, Ireland
	Reid 15'	Report	Bojinov 71'	Stadium: Lansdowne Road; Attendance: 31,887; Referee: Iain Brines (Scotland)

4 September 2006 FIFA World Cup qualification	Iceland	1–3	Bulgariа	Reykjavík, Iceland
16:00 WET	Guðjohnsen 51' (pen.)	Report	Berbatov 35', 49'; Yanev 62'	Stadium: Laugardalsvöllur; Attendance: 5,014; Referee: Alain Hamer (Luxembourg)

9 October 2006 FIFA World Cup qualification	Croatia	2–2	Bulgariа	Zagreb, Croatia
20:15 UTC+1	Srna 15', 31' (pen.)	Report	M. Petrov 77'; Berbatov 86'	Stadium: Maksimir Stadium; Attendance: 31,565; Referee: Pierluigi Collina (Italy)

13 October 2006 FIFA World Cup qualification	Bulgariа	4–1	Malta	Sofia, Bulgaria
18:00 UTC+2	Berbatov 43', 55'; Yanev 47'; Yankov 88'	Report	Mifsud 11'	Stadium: Vasil Levski National Stadium; Attendance: 16,800; Referee: Ceri Richards (Wales)

17 November Friendly	Azerbaijan	0–0	Bulgariа	Baku, Azerbaijan
		Report		Stadium: Tofiq Bahramov Republican Stadium; Attendance: 3,000; Referee: Andrejs Sipailo (Latvia)

29 November Friendly	Egypt	1–1	Bulgariа	Cairo, Egypt
	Moteab 86'	Report	Gargorov 90+2'	Stadium: Osman Ahmed Osman Stadium; Attendance: 2,000; Referee: Naser Abbas (Egypt)

=== 2005 ===
9 February Friendly	Bulgariа	0–0	Serbia and Montenegro	Sofia, Bulgaria
		Report		Stadium: Vasil Levski National Stadium; Attendance: 2,957; Referee: Anton Genov (Bulgaria)

26 March 2006 FIFA World Cup qualification	Bulgariа	0–3	Sweden	Sofia, Bulgaria
17:30 UTC+2		Report	Ljungberg 17', 90+2' (pen.); Edman 74'	Stadium: Vasil Levski National Stadium; Attendance: 42,563; Referee: Herbert Fandel (Germany)

30 March 2006 FIFA World Cup qualification	Hungary	1–1	Bulgariа	Budapest, Hungary
20:45 UTC+1	Rajczi 90'	Report	S. Petrov 51'	Stadium: Ferenc Puskás Stadium; Attendance: 11,586; Referee: Jan Wegereef (Netherlands)

4 June 2006 FIFA World Cup qualification	Bulgariа	1–3	Croatia	Sofia, Bulgaria
18:00 UTC+2	M. Petrov 72'	Report	Babić 19'; Tudor 57'; Kranjčar 80'	Stadium: Vasil Levski National Stadium; Attendance: 30,738; Referee: Kim Milton Nielsen (Denmark)

17 August Friendly	Bulgariа	3–1	Turkey	Sofia, Bulgaria
	Berbatov 24', 43'; M. Petrov 38'	Report	Tekke 20'	Stadium: Vasil Levski National Stadium; Attendance: 3,433; Referee: Hristoforos Zografos (Greece)

3 September 2006 FIFA World Cup qualification	Sweden	3–0	Bulgariа	Solna, Sweden
17:15 UTC+1	Ljungberg 60'; Mellberg 75'; Ibrahimović 90'	Report		Stadium: Råsunda Stadium; Attendance: 33,883; Referee: Frank De Bleeckere (Belgium)

7 September 2006 FIFA World Cup qualification	Bulgariа	3–2	Iceland	Sofia, Bulgaria
19:00 UTC+2	Berbatov 21'; G. Iliev 69'; M. Petrov 86'	Report	Steinsson 9'; Hreiðarsson 16'	Stadium: Vasil Levski National Stadium; Attendance: 18,000; Referee: Bülent Demirlek (Turkey)

8 October 2006 FIFA World Cup qualification	Bulgariа	2–0	Hungary	Sofia, Bulgaria
18:00 UTC+2	Berbatov 29'; Lazarov 55'	Report		Stadium: Vasil Levski National Stadium; Attendance: 4,652; Referee: Dejan Delević (Serbia and Montenegro)

12 October 2006 FIFA World Cup qualification	Malta	1–1	Bulgariа	Ta' Qali, Malta
19:00 UTC+1	Zahra 79'	Report	Yankov 67'	Stadium: National Stadium; Attendance: 2,844; Referee: Vitaliy Godulyan (Ukraine)

12 November Friendly	Bulgariа	6–2	Georgia	Sofia, Bulgaria
	Yankov 2', 28'; Berbatov 35', 47'; S. Todorov 62', 90+3' (pen.)	Report	Jakobia 86'; Gogua 90'	Stadium: Vasil Levski National Stadium; Attendance: 1,375; Referee: Milan Karadžić (Serbia and Montenegro)

16 November Friendly	Mexico	0–3	Bulgariа	Houston, United States
		Report	Valkanov 5'; Bojinov 34'; Berbatov 80'	Stadium: Reliant Stadium; Attendance: 35,526; Referee: Brian Hall (United States)

=== 2006 ===
1 March Friendly	Macedonia	0–1	Bulgaria	Skopje, Macedonia
17:30 UTC+1		Report	M. Petrov 38'	Stadium: City Stadium; Attendance: 8,000; Referee: Tomasz Mikulski (Poland)

9 May Kirin Cup	Japan	1–2	Bulgaria	Osaka, Japan
20:25 UTC+9	Maki 76'	Report	S. Todorov 1'; Yanev 90+1'	Stadium: Nagai Stadium; Attendance: 44,851; Referee: Carlos Megía Dávila (Spain)

11 May Kirin Cup	Bulgaria	1–5	Scotland	Kobe, Japan
20:15 UTC+9	Y. Todorov 26'	Report	Boyd 13', 43'; McFadden 69'; Burke 77', 88'	Stadium: Kobe Wing Stadium; Attendance: 5,780; Referee: Toru Kamikawa (Japan)

15 August Friendly	Wales	0–0	Bulgaria	Swansea, Wales
20:00 WET		Report		Stadium: Liberty Stadium; Attendance: 8,200; Referee: Joseph Attard (Malta)

2 September UEFA Euro 2008 qualifying	Romania	2–2	Bulgaria	Constanţa, Romania
21:00 UTC+3	Roşu 40'; Marica 54'	Report	M. Petrov 82', 84'	Stadium: Gheorghe Hagi Stadium; Attendance: 15,000; Referee: Stefano Farina (Italy)

6 September UEFA Euro 2008 qualifying	Bulgaria	3–0	Slovenia	Sofia, Bulgaria
20:00 UTC+3	Bojinov 58'; M. Petrov 70'; Telkiyski 79'	Report		Stadium: Vasil Levski National Stadium; Attendance: 16,543; Referee: Claus Bo Larsen (Denmark)

7 October UEFA Euro 2008 qualifying	Bulgaria	1–1	Netherlands	Sofia, Bulgaria
21:00 UTC+3	M. Petrov 12'	Report	van Persie 62'	Stadium: Vasil Levski National Stadium; Attendance: 40,547; Referee: Tom Henning Øvrebø (Norway)

11 October UEFA Euro 2008 qualifying	Luxembourg	0–1	Bulgaria	Luxembourg City, Luxembourg
20:15 UTC+2		Report	Tunchev 26'	Stadium: Stade Josy Barthel; Attendance: 3,156; Referee: Novo Panić (Bosnia and Herzegovina)

15 November Friendly	Slovakia	3–1	Bulgaria	Žilina, Slovakia
18:00 UTC+1	Mintál 8'; Sapara 53'; Karhan 78' (pen.)	Report	Karadzhinov 80'	Stadium: Štadión pod Dubňom; Attendance: 4,823; Referee: Jacek Granat (Poland)

=== 2007 ===
6 February Cyprus Tournament	Bulgaria	2–0	Latvia	Larnaca, Cyprus
17:30 UTC+2	Surņins 18' (o.g.); Yovov 33'	Report		Stadium: GSZ Stadium; Attendance: 400; Referee: Panikos Andronikou (Cyprus)

7 February Cyprus Tournament	Cyprus	0–3	Bulgaria	Strovolos, Cyprus
19:00 UTC+2		Report	Berbatov 45' (pen.), 87'; Georgiev 68'	Stadium: GSP Stadium; Attendance: 680; Referee: Leontios Trattou (Cyprus)

28 March UEFA Euro 2008 qualifying	Bulgaria	0–0	Albania	Sofia, Bulgaria
18:00 UTC+3		Report		Stadium: Vasil Levski National Stadium; Attendance: 25,000; Referee: Jonas Eriksson (Sweden)

2 June UEFA Euro 2008 qualifying	Belarus	0–2	Bulgaria	Minsk, Belarus
21:00 UTC+3		Report	Berbatov 28', 46'	Stadium: Dinamo Stadium; Attendance: 29,000; Referee: Jaroslav Jára (Czech Republic)

6 June UEFA Euro 2008 qualifying	Bulgaria	2–1	Belarus	Sofia, Bulgaria
20:00 UTC+3	M. Petrov 10'; Yankov 40'	Report	Vasilyuk 5' (pen.)	Stadium: Vasil Levski National Stadium; Attendance: 10,227; Referee: Kristinn Jakobsson (Iceland)

22 August Friendly	Bulgaria	0–1	Wales	Burgas, Bulgaria
11:00 UTC+2		Report	Eastwood 45'	Stadium: Lazur Stadium; Attendance: 12,000; Referee: Mihalis Germanakos (Greece)

8 September UEFA Euro 2008 qualifying	Netherlands	2–0	Bulgaria	Amsterdam, Netherlands
20:30 UTC+2	Sneijder 23' van Nistelrooy 58'	Report		Stadium: Amsterdam ArenA; Attendance: 50,000; Referee: Luis Medina Cantalejo (Spain)

12 September UEFA Euro 2008 qualifying	Bulgaria	3–0	Luxembourg	Sofia, Bulgaria
20:30 UTC+3	Berbatov 27', 28'; M. Petrov 54' (pen.)	Report		Stadium: Vasil Levski National Stadium; Attendance: 8,000; Referee: Bülent Demirlek (Turkey)

17 October UEFA Euro 2008 qualifying	Albania	1–1	Bulgaria	Tirana, Albania
20:45 UTC+2	Duro 32'	Report	Berbatov 87'	Stadium: Qemal Stafa Stadium; Attendance: 8,000; Referee: Fritz Stuchlik (Austria)

17 November UEFA Euro 2008 qualifying	Bulgaria	1–0	Romania	Sofia, Bulgaria
18:00 UTC+2	V. Dimitrov 6'	Report		Stadium: Vasil Levski National Stadium; Attendance: 15,000; Referee: Konrad Plautz (Austria)

21 November UEFA Euro 2008 qualifying	Slovenia	0–2	Bulgaria	Celje, Slovenia
18:00 UTC+1		Report	Georgiev 81'; Berbatov 84'	Stadium: Arena Petrol; Attendance: 4,000; Referee: Mike Mullarkey (England)

=== 2008 ===
6 February Friendly	Northern Ireland	0–1	Bulgaria	Belfast, Northern Ireland
18:30 WET		Report	Evans 38' (o.g.)	Stadium: Windsor Park; Attendance: 12,648; Referee: Dougie McDonald (Scotland)

26 March Friendly	Bulgaria	2–1	Finland	Sofia, Bulgaria
20:30 UTC+2	Lazarov 49'; Genchev 90'	Report	Litmanen 22' (pen.)	Stadium: Vasil Levski National Stadium; Attendance: 2,500; Referee: Alexandru Tudor (Romania)

20 August Friendly	Bosnia and Herzegovina	1–2	Bulgaria	Zenica, Bosnia and Herzegovina
20:45 UTC+1	Ibričić 59'	Report	Berbatov 26', 57'	Stadium: Bilino Polje Stadium; Attendance: 7,000; Referee: Dragomir Stanković (Serbia)

6 September 2010 FIFA World Cup qualification	Montenegro	2–2	Bulgaria	Podgorica, Montenegro
20:00 UTC+2	Vučinić 61'; Jovetić 82' (pen.)	Report	S. Petrov 11'; Georgiev 90+2'	Stadium: City Stadium; Attendance: 9,000; Referee: Oleh Oriekhov (Ukraine)

11 October 2010 FIFA World Cup qualification	Bulgaria	0–0	Italy	Sofia, Bulgaria
21:15 UTC+3		Report		Stadium: Vasil Levski National Stadium; Attendance: 35,000; Referee: Stéphane Lannoy (France)

15 October 2010 FIFA World Cup qualification	Georgia	0–0	Bulgaria	Tbilisi, Georgia
20:30 UTC+4		Report		Stadium: Boris Paichadze Dinamo Arena; Attendance: 35,250; Referee: Bjorn Kuipers (Netherlands)

19 November Friendly	Serbia	6–1	Bulgaria	Belgrade, Serbia
17:15 UTC+1	Jovanović 9', 25'; Milošević 27', 33'; Milijaš 56'; Lazović 67'	Report	Georgiev 21'	Stadium: Partizan Stadium; Attendance: 7,000; Referee: Peter Sippel (Germany)

=== 2009 ===
11 February Friendly	Switzerland	1–1	Bulgaria	Lancy, Switzerland
20:15 UTC+1	Huggel 45'	Report	I. Popov 33'	Stadium: Stade de Genève; Attendance: 9,670; Referee: Duarte Gomes (Portugal)

28 March 2010 FIFA World Cup qualification	Republic of Ireland	1–1	Bulgaria	Dublin, Ireland
19:45 WET	Dunne 1'	Report	Kilbane 74' (o.g.)	Stadium: Croke Park; Attendance: 60,002; Referee: Ivan Bebek (Croatia)

1 April 2010 FIFA World Cup qualification	Bulgaria	2–0	Cyprus	Sofia, Bulgaria
18:00 UTC+3	I. Popov 8'; Makriev 90+4'	Report		Stadium: Vasil Levski National Stadium; Attendance: 16,916; Referee: Martin Ingvarsson (Sweden)

6 June 2010 FIFA World Cup qualification	Bulgaria	1–1	Republic of Ireland	Sofia, Bulgaria
20:30 UTC+3	Telkiyski 29'	Report	Dunne 24'	Stadium: Vasil Levski National Stadium; Attendance: 38,000; Referee: Claus Bo Larsen (Denmark)

12 August Friendly	Bulgaria	1–0	Latvia	Sofia, Bulgaria
19:15 UTC+3	Rangelov 54'	Report		Stadium: Vasil Levski National Stadium; Attendance: 1,500; Referee: Vasilis Pamboridis (Greece)

5 September 2010 FIFA World Cup qualification	Bulgaria	4–1	Montenegro	Sofia, Bulgaria
20:30 UTC+3	Kishishev 45+1'; Telkiyski 49'; Berbatov 83'; Domovchiyski 90+1'	Report	Jovetić 9'	Stadium: Vasil Levski National Stadium; Attendance: 7,543; Referee: Tony Asumaa (Finland)

9 September 2010 FIFA World Cup qualification	Italy	2–0	Bulgaria	Turin, Italy
20:50 UTC+2	Grosso 11'; Iaquinta 40'	Report		Stadium: Stadio Olimpico; Attendance: 26,122; Referee: Florian Meyer (Germany)

10 October 2010 FIFA World Cup qualification	Cyprus	4–1	Bulgaria	Larnaca, Cyprus
20:00 UTC+3	Charalambides 11', 20'; Konstantinou 58'; Aloneftis 78'	Report	Berbatov 44'	Stadium: Antonis Papadopoulos Stadium; Attendance: 3,700; Referee: Paul Allaerts (Belgium)

14 October 2010 FIFA World Cup qualification	Bulgaria	6–2	Georgia	Sofia, Bulgaria
21:00 UTC+3	Berbatov 6', 23', 35'; M. Petrov 14', 44'; Angelov 31'	Report	Dvalishvili 34'; Kobiashvili 51' (pen.)	Stadium: Vasil Levski National Stadium; Attendance: 700; Referee: Kristinn Jakobsson (Iceland)

18 November Friendly	Malta	1–4	Bulgaria	Paola, Malta
20:30 UTC+1	Mifsud 48'	Report	Bojinov 5'; Berbatov 75', 82'; Georgiev 80'	Stadium: Hibernians Stadium; Attendance: 2,000; Referee: Bas Nijhuis (Netherlands)

=== 2010 ===
3 March Friendly	Poland	2–0	Bulgaria	Warsaw, Poland
20:15 UTC+1	Błaszczykowski 42'; Lewandowski 62'	Report		Stadium: Konwiktorska Street Municipal Stadium; Attendance: 6,800; Referee: Sascha Kever (Switzerland)

19 May Friendly	Belgium	2–1	Bulgaria	Brussels, Belgium
20:45 UTC+1	Lepoint 89'; Kompany 90+1'	Report	I. Popov 31'	Stadium: King Baudouin Stadium; Attendance: 25,000; Referee: Michael Weiner (Germany)

24 May Friendly	South Africa	1–1	Bulgaria	Johannesburg, South Africa
21:15 UTC+2	Sangweni 20'	Report	Bojinov 31'	Stadium: Orlando Stadium; Attendance: 38,000; Referee: Kokou Fagla (Togo)

11 August Friendly	Russia	1–0	Bulgaria	Saint Petersburg, Russia
10:15 UTC+3	Shirokov 6'	Report		Stadium: Petrovsky Stadium; Attendance: 8,200; Referee: Nicola Rizzoli (Italy)

3 September UEFA Euro 2012 qualifying	England	4–0	Bulgaria	London, England
20:00 UTC+1	Defoe 3', 61', 86'; A. Johnson 83'	Report		Stadium: Wembley Stadium; Attendance: 73,426; Referee: Viktor Kassai (Hungary)

7 September UEFA Euro 2012 qualifying	Bulgaria	0–1	Montenegro	Sofia, Bulgaria
20:30 UTC+3		Report	Zverotić 35'	Stadium: Vasil Levski National Stadium; Attendance: 9,470; Referee: Vladislav Bezborodov (Russia)

8 October UEFA Euro 2012 qualifying	Wales	0–1	Bulgaria	Cardiff, Wales
19:30 UTC+1		Report	I. Popov 48'	Stadium: Cardiff City Stadium; Attendance: 14,061; Referee: Jonas Eriksson (Sweden)

12 October Friendly	Saudi Arabia	0–2	Bulgaria	Istanbul, Turkey
19:30 UTC+3		Report	Rangelov 40'; Domovchiyski 45'	Stadium: Atatürk Olympic Stadium; Attendance: 70; Referee: Hüseyin Göçek (Turkey)

17 November Friendly	Bulgaria	0–1	Serbia	Sofia, Bulgaria
21:45 UTC+2		Report	Žigić 80'	Stadium: Vasil Levski National Stadium; Attendance: 1,500; Referee: Marius Avram (Romania)

=== 2011 ===
26 March UEFA Euro 2012 qualifying	Bulgaria	0–0	Switzerland	Sofia, Bulgaria
18:45 UTC+2		Report		Stadium: Vasil Levski National Stadium; Attendance: 9,600; Referee: Willie Collum (Scotland)

29 March Friendly	Cyprus	0–1	Bulgaria	Larnaca, Cyprus
20:45 UTC+3		Report	M. Petrov 35'	Stadium: Antonis Papadopoulos Stadium; Attendance: 120; Referee: Marco Borg (Malta)

4 June UEFA Euro 2012 qualifying	Montenegro	1–1	Bulgaria	Podgorica, Montenegro
20:30 UTC+2	Đalović 53'	Report	I. Popov 66'	Stadium: City Stadium; Attendance: 11,500; Referee: Alon Yefet (Israel)

10 August Friendly	Belarus	1–0	Bulgaria	Minsk, Belarus
17:30 UTC+2	Kislyak 33'	Report		Stadium: Dynamo Stadium; Attendance: 6,500; Referee: Nerijus Dunauskas (Lithuania)

2 September UEFA Euro 2012 qualifying	Bulgaria	0–3	England	Sofia, Bulgaria
21:15 UTC+3		Report	Cahill 13'; Rooney 21', 45+1'	Stadium: Vasil Levski National Stadium; Attendance: 27,230; Referee: Frank De Bleeckere (Belgium)

6 September UEFA Euro 2012 qualifying	Switzerland	3–1	Bulgaria	Basel, Switzerland
20:30 UTC+2	Shaqiri 45+2', 62', 90'	Report	I. Ivanov 8'	Stadium: St. Jakob-Park; Attendance: 16,880; Referee: Pavel Královec (Czech Republic)

7 October Friendly	Ukraine	3–0	Bulgaria	Kyiv, Ukraine
20:30 UTC+2	Selin 7'; Shevchenko 39'; Yarmolenko 82'	Report		Stadium: Valeriy Lobanovskyi Dynamo Stadium; Attendance: 10,000; Referee: Pavel Královec (Czech Republic)

11 October UEFA Euro 2012 qualifying	Bulgaria	0–1	Wales	Sofia, Bulgaria
21:05 UTC+3		Report	Bale 45'	Stadium: Vasil Levski National Stadium; Attendance: 1,672; Referee: Paweł Gil (Poland)

=== 2012 ===
29 February Friendly	Hungary	1–1	Bulgaria	Győr, Hungary
18:00 UTC+1	Szalai 42'	Report	Bojinov 87'	Stadium: ETO Park; Attendance: 15,000; Referee: Jonas Eriksson (Sweden)

26 May Friendly	Netherlands	1–2	Bulgaria	Amsterdam, Netherlands
19:00 UTC+2	van Persie 45'	Report	I. Popov 49' (pen.); Mitsanski 90+3'	Stadium: Amsterdam ArenA; Attendance: 45,000; Referee: Fernando Teixeira Vitienes (Spain)

29 May Friendly	Bulgaria	0–2	Turkey	Wals-Siezenheim, Austria
19:30 UTC+1		Report	Toprak 22'; Yılmaz 90+1'	Stadium: Wals-Siezenheim Stadium; Attendance: 2,000; Referee: Gerhard Grobelnik (Austria)

15 August Friendly	Bulgaria	1–0	Cyprus	Sofia, Bulgaria
20:30 UTC+2	Mitsanski 66'	Report		Stadium: Georgi Asparuhov Stadium; Attendance: 400; Referee: Christopher Lautier (Malta)

7 September 2014 FIFA World Cup qualification	Bulgaria	2–2	Italy	Sofia, Bulgaria
21:45 UTC+3	Manolev 30'; G. Milanov 66'	Report	Osvaldo 36', 40'	Stadium: Vasil Levski National Stadium; Attendance: 12,993; Referee: Martin Atkinson (England)

11 September 2014 FIFA World Cup qualification	Bulgaria	1–0	Armenia	Sofia, Bulgaria
21:00 UTC+3	Manolev 43'	Report		Stadium: Vasil Levski National Stadium; Attendance: 17,883; Referee: Stephan Studer (Switzerland)

12 October 2014 FIFA World Cup qualification	Bulgaria	1–1	Denmark	Sofia, Bulgaria
21:00 UTC+3	Rangelov 7'	Report	Bendtner 40'	Stadium: Vasil Levski National Stadium; Attendance: 20,780; Referee: Tony Chapron (France)

16 October 2014 FIFA World Cup qualification	Czech Republic	0–0	Bulgaria	Prague, Czech Republic
20:00 UTC+2		Report		Stadium: Generali Arena; Attendance: 16,163; Referee: Vladislav Bezborodov (Russia)

14 November Friendly	Bulgaria	0–1	Ukraine	Sofia, Bulgaria
18:00 UTC+2		Report	Kucher 34'	Stadium: Vasil Levski National Stadium; Attendance: 1,000; Referee: Milorad Mažić (Serbia)

=== 2013 ===
22 March 2014 FIFA World Cup qualification	Bulgaria	6–0	Malta	Sofia, Bulgaria
18:00 UTC+2	Tonev 6', 38', 68'; I. Popov 47'; Gargorov 55'; I. Ivanov 78'	Report		Stadium: Vasil Levski National Stadium; Attendance: 0 Referee: Eitan Shemeulevitch (Israel)

26 March 2014 FIFA World Cup qualification	Denmark	1–1	Bulgaria	Copenhagen, Denmark
20:15 UTC+1	Agger 63' (pen.)	Report	Manolev 51'	Stadium: Parken Stadium; Attendance: 22,357; Referee: Fırat Aydınus (Turkey)

30 May Kirin Cup	Japan	0–2	Bulgaria	Toyota, Japan
20:30 UTC+9		Report	Manolev 3'; Hasebe 70' (o.g.)	Stadium: Toyota Stadium; Attendance: 41,353; Referee: Kim Sang-woo (South Korea)

4 June Friendly	Kazakhstan	1–2	Bulgaria	Almaty, Kazakhstan
20:00 UTC+6	Shomko 89'	Report	G. Iliev 55'; I. Ivanov 60'	Stadium: Almaty Central Stadium; Attendance: 15,200; Referee: Aliyar Aghayev (Azerbaijan)

14 August Friendly	Macedonia	2–0	Bulgaria	Skopje, Macedonia
21:00 UTC+2	Ibraimi 83' (pen.); Trajkovski 86'	Report		Stadium: Philip II Arena; Attendance: 4,000; Referee: Milenko Vukadinović (Serbia)

6 September 2014 FIFA World Cup qualification	Italy	1–0	Bulgaria	Palermo, Italy
20:45 UTC+2	Gilardino 38'	Report		Stadium: Stadio Renzo Barbera; Attendance: 28,662; Referee: Carlos Velasco Carballo (Spain)

10 September 2014 FIFA World Cup qualification	Malta	1–2	Bulgaria	Ta' Qali, Malta
20:00 UTC+2	Herrera 77'	Report	R. Dimitrov 9'; Gargorov 59'	Stadium: National Stadium; Attendance: 4,884; Referee: Alexandru Tudor (Romania)

11 October 2014 FIFA World Cup qualification	Armenia	2–1	Bulgaria	Yerevan, Armenia
19:00 UTC+4	Özbiliz 45+1'; Movsisyan 87'	Report	I. Popov 61'	Stadium: Vazgen Sargsyan Republican Stadium; Attendance: 11,000; Referee: Felix Brych (Germany)

15 October 2014 FIFA World Cup qualification	Bulgaria	0–1	Czech Republic	Sofia, Bulgaria
21:15 UTC+3		Report	Dočkal 51'	Stadium: Vasil Levski National Stadium; Attendance: 25,464; Referee: Viktor Kassai (Hungary)

=== 2014 ===
5 March Friendly	Bulgaria	2–1	Belarus	Sofia, Bulgaria
17:45 UTC+2	G. Milanov 14'; Gadzhev 66'	Report	Krivets 86'	Stadium: Vasil Levski National Stadium; Attendance: 500; Referee: Milenko Vukadinović (Serbia)

23 May Friendly	Canada	1–1	Bulgaria	Ritzing, Austria
17:30 UTC+2	Hutchinson 26' (pen.)	Report	Galabinov 19'	Stadium: Sonnenseestadion; Attendance: 50; Referee: Harald Lechner (Austria)

9 September UEFA Euro 2016 qualifying	Azerbaijan	1–2	Bulgaria	Baku, Azerbaijan
21:00 UTC+5	Nazarov 54'	Report	Mitsanski 14'; V. Hristov 87'	Stadium: Bakcell Arena; Attendance: 11,000; Referee: Alon Yefet (Israel)

10 October UEFA Euro 2016 qualifying	Bulgaria	0–1	Croatia	Sofia, Bulgaria
21:45 UTC+3		Report	Bodurov 36' (o.g.)	Stadium: Vasil Levski National Stadium; Attendance: 29,733; Referee: Antonio Mateu Lahoz (Spain)

13 October UEFA Euro 2016 qualifying	Norway	2–1	Bulgaria	Oslo, Norway
20:45 UTC+2	T. Elyounoussi 13'; Nielsen 72'	Report	Bodurov 43'	Stadium: Ullevaal Stadium; Attendance: 18,990; Referee: Olegário Benquerença (Portugal)

16 November UEFA Euro 2016 qualifying	Bulgaria	1–1	Malta	Sofia, Bulgaria
21:45 UTC+2	Galabinov 6'	Report	Failla 49' (pen.)	Stadium: Vasil Levski National Stadium; Attendance: 3,300; Referee: Martin Strömbergsson (Sweden)

=== 2015 ===
28 March UEFA Euro 2016 qualifying	Bulgaria	2–2	Italy	Sofia, Bulgaria
21:45 UTC+2	I. Popov 11'; Mitsanski 17'	Report	Y. Minev 4' (o.g.); Éder 84'	Stadium: Vasil Levski National Stadium; Attendance: 6,000; Referee: Damir Skomina (Slovenia)

8 June Friendly	Turkey	4–0	Bulgaria	Istanbul, Turkey
20:30 UTC+3	Çalhanoğlu 49', 54'; Yılmaz 56', 80'	Report		Stadium: Recep Tayyip Erdoğan Stadium; Attendance: 3,200; Referee: Davide Massa (Italy)

12 June UEFA Euro 2016 qualifying	Malta	0–1	Bulgaria	Ta' Qali, Malta
20:45 UTC+2		Report	I. Popov 56'	Stadium: National Stadium; Attendance: 3,924; Referee: Aleksandar Stavrev (Macedonia)

3 September UEFA Euro 2016 qualifying	Bulgaria	0–1	Norway	Sofia, Bulgaria
21:45 UTC+3		Report	Forren 57'	Stadium: Vasil Levski National Stadium; Attendance: 12,913; Referee: Bas Nijhuis (Netherlands)

6 September UEFA Euro 2016 qualifying	Italy	1–0	Bulgaria	Palermo, Italy
20:45 UTC+2	De Rossi 6' (pen.)	Report		Stadium: Stadio Renzo Barbera; Attendance: 21,000; Referee: Sergei Karasev (Russia)

10 October UEFA Euro 2016 qualifying	Croatia	3–0	Bulgaria	Zagreb, Croatia
20:45 UTC+2	Perišić 2'; Rakitić 42'; N. Kalinić 81'	Report		Stadium: Maksimir Stadium; Attendance: 0 Referee: Artur Soares Dias (Portugal)

13 October UEFA Euro 2016 qualifying	Bulgaria	2–0	Azerbaijan	Sofia, Bulgaria
21:45 UTC+3	M. Aleksandrov 20'; Rangelov 56'	Report		Stadium: Vasil Levski National Stadium; Attendance: 2,500; Referee: Tamás Bognár (Hungary)

=== 2016 ===
25 March Friendly	Portugal	0–1	Bulgaria	Leiria, Portugal
20:45 UTC±0		Report	Marcelinho 19'	Stadium: Estádio Dr. Magalhães Pessoa; Attendance: 19,355; Referee: Carlos Clos Gómez (Spain)

29 March Friendly	Macedonia	0–2	Bulgaria	Skopje, Macedonia
19:00 UTC+2		Report	Rangelov 66'; Tonev 88'	Stadium: Philip II Arena; Attendance: 1,000; Referee: Enea Jorgji (Albania)

3 June 2016 Kirin Cup Semi-finals	Japan	7–2	Bulgaria	Toyota, Japan
19:40 UTC+9	Okazaki 3'; Kagawa 26', 35'; Yoshida 38', 53'; Usami 57'; Asano 87' (pen.)	Report	M. Aleksandrov 59'; Chochev 82'	Stadium: Toyota Stadium; Attendance: 41,940; Referee: Bartosz Frankowski (Poland)

7 June 2016 Kirin Cup Final	Denmark	4–0	Bulgaria	Suita, Japan
16:00 UTC+9	Rasmussen 39'; Eriksen 72', 74', 82'	Report		Stadium: Suita City Football Stadium; Attendance: 14,223; Referee: Ryuji Sato (Japan)

6 September 2018 FIFA World Cup qualification	Bulgaria	4–3	Luxembourg	Sofia, Bulgaria
21:45 UTC+3	Rangelov 16'; Marcelinho 65'; I. Popov 79'; Tonev 90+2'	Report (FIFA); Report (UEFA)	Joachim 60', 62'; Bohnert 90+1'	Stadium: Vasil Levski National Stadium; Attendance: 4,202; Referee: Gediminas Mažeika (Lithuania)

7 October 2018 FIFA World Cup qualification	France	4–1	Bulgaria	Saint-Denis, France
20:45 UTC+2	Gameiro 23', 59'; Payet 26'; Griezmann 38'	Report (FIFA); Report (UEFA)	M. Aleksandrov 6' (pen.)	Stadium: Stade de France; Attendance: 65,475; Referee: Luca Banti (Italy)

10 October 2018 FIFA World Cup qualification	Sweden	3–0	Bulgaria	Solna, Sweden
20:45 UTC+2	Toivonen 39'; Hiljemark 45'; Lindelöf 58'	Report (FIFA); Report (UEFA)		Stadium: Friends Arena; Attendance: 21,777; Referee: Michael Oliver (England)

13 November 2018 FIFA World Cup qualification	Bulgaria	1–0	Belarus	Sofia, Bulgaria
19:00 UTC+2	I. Popov 10'	Report (FIFA); Report (UEFA)		Stadium: Vasil Levski National Stadium; Attendance: 1,994; Referee: Stephan Klossner (Switzerland)

=== 2017 ===
25 March 2018 FIFA World Cup qualification	Bulgaria	2–0	Netherlands	Sofia, Bulgaria
21:45 UTC+2	Delev 5', 20'	Report (FIFA); Report (UEFA)		Stadium: Vasil Levski National Stadium; Attendance: 10,900; Referee: Willie Collum (Scotland)

9 June 2018 FIFA World Cup qualification	Belarus	2–1	Bulgaria	Barysaw, Belarus
21:45 UTC+3	Sivakow 33' (pen.); Savitski 80'	Report (FIFA); Report (UEFA)	Kostadinov 90+1'	Stadium: Borisov Arena; Attendance: 6,150; Referee: Matej Jug (Slovenia)

31 August 2018 FIFA World Cup qualification	Bulgaria	3–2	Sweden	Sofia, Bulgaria
21:45 UTC+3	Manolev 12'; Kostadinov 33'; Chochev 79'	Report (FIFA); Report (UEFA)	Lustig 29'; Berg 44'	Stadium: Vasil Levski National Stadium; Attendance: 12,121; Referee: Paolo Tagliavento (Italy)

3 September 2018 FIFA World Cup qualification	Netherlands	3–1	Bulgaria	Amsterdam, Netherlands
18:00 UTC+2	Pröpper 7', 80'; Robben 67'	Report (FIFA); Report (UEFA)	Kostadinov 69'	Stadium: Amsterdam ArenA; Attendance: 47,079; Referee: Anastasios Sidiropoulos (Greece)

7 October 2018 FIFA World Cup qualification	Bulgaria	0–1	France	Sofia, Bulgaria
21:45 UTC+3		Report (FIFA); Report (UEFA)	Matuidi 3'	Stadium: Vasil Levski National Stadium; Attendance: 12,921; Referee: Antonio Mateu Lahoz (Spain)

10 October 2018 FIFA World Cup qualification	Luxembourg	1–1	Bulgaria	Luxembourg City, Luxembourg
20:45 UTC+2	O. Thill 3'	Report (FIFA); Report (UEFA)	Chochev 68'	Stadium: Stade Josy Barthel; Attendance: 2,936; Referee: István Vad (Hungary)

13 November Friendly	Saudi Arabia	0–1	Bulgaria	Lisbon, Portugal
17:00 UTC±0		Report	I. Popov 81'	Stadium: Estádio do Restelo; Attendance: 500; Referee: Fabio Veríssimo (Portugal)

=== 2018 ===
23 March Friendly	Bulgaria	0–1	Bosnia and Herzegovina	Razgrad, Bulgaria
19:00 UTC+2		Report	Kodro 20'	Stadium: Ludogorets Arena; Attendance: 2,200; Referee: François Letexier (France)

26 March Friendly	Bulgaria	2–1	Kazakhstan	Felcsút, Hungary
18:00 UTC+2	I. Popov 23' (pen.); Bodurov 90+4'	Report	Tungyshbayev 55'	Stadium: Pancho Aréna; Attendance: 100; Referee: Tamás Bognár (Hungary)

6 September UEFA Nations League	Slovenia	1–2	Bulgaria	Ljubljana, Slovenia
20:45 UTC+2	Zajc 40'	Report	Kraev 3', 59'	Stadium: Stožice Stadium; Attendance: 5,100; Referee: Davide Massa (Italy)

9 September UEFA Nations League	Bulgaria	1–0	Norway	Sofia, Bulgaria
19:00 UTC+3	Vasilev 59'	Report		Stadium: Vasil Levski National Stadium; Attendance: 7,100; Referee: Daniel Stefański (Poland)

13 October UEFA Nations League	Bulgaria	2–1	Cyprus	Sofia, Bulgaria
21:45 UTC+3	Despodov 59'; Nedelev 68'	Report	Kastanos 41'	Stadium: Vasil Levski National Stadium; Attendance: 6,700; Referee: Srđan Jovanović (Serbia)

16 October UEFA Nations League	Norway	1–0	Bulgaria	Oslo, Norway
20:45 UTC+2	M. Elyounoussi 31'	Report		Stadium: Ullevaal Stadium; Attendance: 9,523; Referee: John Beaton (Scotland)

16 November UEFA Nations League	Cyprus	1–1	Bulgaria	Strovolos, Cyprus
21:45 UTC+2	Zachariou 24'	Report	N. Dimitrov 89' (pen.)	Stadium: GSP Stadium; Attendance: 3,844; Referee: Mohammed Al-Hakim (Sweden)

19 November UEFA Nations League	Bulgaria	1–1	Slovenia	Sofia, Bulgaria
21:45 UTC+2	Ga. Ivanov 68'	Report	Zajc 75'	Stadium: Vasil Levski National Stadium; Attendance: 3,092; Referee: Hüseyin Göçek (Turkey)

=== 2019 ===
22 March UEFA Euro 2020 qualifying	Bulgaria	1–1	Montenegro	Sofia, Bulgaria
19:00 UTC+2	Nedelev 82' (pen.)	Report	Mugoša 50'	Stadium: Vasil Levski National Stadium; Attendance: 5,652; Referee: Ruddy Buquet (France)

25 March UEFA Euro 2020 qualifying	Kosovo	1–1	Bulgaria	Pristina, Kosovo
20:45 UTC+1	Zeneli 61'	Report	Bozhikov 39'	Stadium: Fadil Vokrri Stadium; Attendance: 12,580; Referee: Gediminas Mažeika (Lithuania)

7 June UEFA Euro 2020 qualifying	Czech Republic	2–1	Bulgaria	Prague, Czech Republic
20:45 UTC+1	Schick 20', 50'	Report	Isa 3'	Stadium: Generali Arena; Attendance: 13,482; Referee: Tamás Bognár (Hungary)

10 June UEFA Euro 2020 qualifying	Bulgaria	2–3	Kosovo	Sofia, Bulgaria
21:45 UTC+3	I. Popov 43'; K. Dimitrov 55'	Report	Rashica 14'; Muriqi 64'; Rashani 90+3'	Stadium: Vasil Levski National Stadium; Attendance: 4,994; Referee: Mads-Kristoffer Kristoffersen (Denmark)

7 September UEFA Euro 2020 qualifying	England	4–0	Bulgaria	London, England
17:00 UTC+1	Kane 24', 50' (pen.), 73' (pen.); Sterling 55'	Report		Stadium: Wembley Stadium; Attendance: 82,605; Referee: Marco Guida (Italy)

10 September Friendly	Republic of Ireland	3–1	Bulgaria	Dublin, Ireland
19:45 UTC+1	Browne 56'; Long 83'; Collins 86'	Report	I. Popov 67' (pen.)	Stadium: Aviva Stadium; Attendance: 18,259; Referee: Tobias Welz (Germany)

11 October UEFA Euro 2020 qualifying	Montenegro	0–0	Bulgaria	Podgorica, Montenegro
20:45 UTC+2		Report		Stadium: City Stadium; Attendance: 3,012; Referee: Andreas Ekberg (Sweden)

14 October UEFA Euro 2020 qualifying	Bulgaria	0–6	England	Sofia, Bulgaria
21:45 UTC+3		Report	Rashford 7'; Barkley 20', 32'; Sterling 45+3', 69'; Kane 85'	Stadium: Vasil Levski National Stadium; Attendance: 17,481; Referee: Ivan Bebek (Croatia)

14 November Friendly	Bulgaria	0–1	Paraguay	Sofia, Bulgaria
19:00 UTC+2		Report	Almirón 60'	Stadium: Vasil Levski National Stadium; Attendance: 500; Referee: Inácio Pereira (Portugal)

17 November UEFA Euro 2020 qualifying	Bulgaria	1–0	Czech Republic	Sofia, Bulgaria
19:00 UTC+2	Bozhikov 56'	Report		Stadium: Vasil Levski National Stadium; Attendance: 0 Referee: Sergei Karasev (Russia)
