= Croatia national football team results (2000–2009) =

This is a list of the Croatia national football team results from 2000 to 2009.

After missing out UEFA Euro 2000, the team qualified for the next four major tournaments, the FIFA World Cups in 2002 and 2006 and the UEFA European Championships in 2004 and 2008, reaching the quarter-finals of Euro 2008. It then failed to qualify for the 2010 World Cup.

== Key ==
Match outcomes

Win
Draw
Loss

As per statistical convention in football, matches decided in extra time are counted as wins and losses, while matches decided by penalty shoot-outs are counted as draws.

== By year ==
=== 2000 ===
23 February 2000 Friendly	Croatia	0–0	Spain	Split, Croatia
	Asanović (yellow card) 13'	Report	Hierro (yellow card) 17'	Stadium: Stadion Poljud; Attendance: 10,000; Referee: Attila Hanacsek (Hungary); Assistant referees: Béla Mező (Hungary); János Ring (Hungary)

29 March 2000 Friendly	Croatia	1–1	Germany	Zagreb, Croatia
	Šuker (yellow card) 39'; N. Kovač 70' (yellow card) 73'; R. Kovač (yellow card) 78'	Report	Rehmer 12'; Bierhoff (yellow card) 57'; Ramelow (yellow card) 58'	Stadium: Stadion Maksimir; Attendance: 10,000; Referee: Ľubomír Suchý (Slovakia); Assistant referees: Ivan Bartoš (Slovakia); Martin Balko (Slovakia)

26 April 2000 Friendly	Austria	1–2	Croatia	Vienna, Austria
	Vastić 16'; Schopp (yellow card) 26'	Report	Bokšić 29' (yellow card) 40'; Stanić 66'	Stadium: Ernst-Happel-Stadion; Attendance: 15,000; Referee: Lutz Michael Fröhlich (Germany); Assistant referees: Helmut Bley (Germany); Peter Weise (Germany)

28 May 2000 Friendly	Croatia	0–2	France	Zagreb, Croatia
	Šuker (yellow card) 83'	Report	Pires 23'; Zidane (yellow card) 62'; Trezeguet 70'	Stadium: Stadion Maksimir; Attendance: 10,000; Referee: Fritz Stuchlik (Austria); Assistant referees: Wojciech Gorgon (Austria); Johann Almer (Austria)

16 August 2000 Friendly	Slovakia	1–1	Croatia	Bratislava, Slovakia
	Németh 28'	Report	Balaban 23' (yellow card) 70'; Cvitanović (yellow card) 58'	Stadium: Tehelné pole Attendance: 5,000; Referee: Michal Beneš (Czech Republic); Assistant referees: Petr Časný (Czech Republic); Milan Ondo (Czech Republic)

2 September 2000 2002 World Cup qualif, Gr 6	Belgium	0–0	Croatia	Brussels, Belgium
	Vanderhaeghe (yellow card) 86'	Report	N. Kovač (yellow card) 11'; Bišćan (yellow card) 67'; R. Kovač (yellow card) 73'; Šuker (yellow card) 84'	Stadium: King Baudouin Stadium; Attendance: 27,510; Referee: Nikolai Levnikov (Russia); Assistant referees: Mikhail Semyonov (Russia); Sergey Germanchuk (Russia)

11 October 2000 2002 World Cup qualif, Gr 6	Croatia	1–1	Scotland	Zagreb, Croatia
	Bokšić 16'; N. Kovač (yellow card) 89'	Report	Gallacher 24'; Johnston (yellow card) 27'; Naysmith (yellow card) 47'; Dickov (yellow card) 77'; Hutchison (yellow card) 88'	Stadium: Stadion Maksimir; Attendance: 17,995; Referee: Gilles Veissière (France); Assistant referees: Jacques Mas (France); Serge Vallin (France)

=== 2001 ===
23 February 2001 Friendly	Croatia	1–0	Austria	Rijeka, Croatia
	Vugrinec 53'; Balaban (yellow card) 63'	Report	Prilasing (yellow card) 83'	Stadium: Stadion Kantrida; Attendance: 2,000; Referee: Leif Sundell (Sweden); Assistant referees: Per-Inge Nyberg (Sweden); Erik Bergsten (Sweden)

24 March 2001 2002 World Cup qualif, Gr 6	Croatia	4–1	Latvia	Osijek, Croatia
	Balaban 8', 42', 45'; Vugrinec (yellow card) 44' (goal) 88'; Tudor (yellow card) 64'; Cvitanović (yellow card) 81'	Report	Laizāns (yellow card) 10'; Troickis (yellow card) 30'; Štolcers 60'	Stadium: Stadion Gradski vrt Attendance: 13,345; Referee: Martin Ingvarsson (Sweden); Assistant referees: Kenneth Petersson (Sweden); Henrik Hansson (Sweden)

25 April 2001 Friendly	Croatia	2–2	Greece	Varaždin, Croatia
	Tomas (yellow card) 34'; Jarni (yellow card) 43'; Vlaović 67'; Rapaić 90'	Report	Alexandris 38', 51'; Karagounis (yellow card) 45'	Stadium: Stadion Varteks; Attendance: 10,000; Referee: Hartmut Strampe (Germany); Assistant referees: Christian Schräer (Germany); Sönke Glindemann (Germany)

2 June 2001 2002 World Cup qualif, Gr 6	Croatia	4–0	San Marino	Varaždin, Croatia
	Vlaović 2'; Balaban 29'; R. Kovač (yellow card) 31'; Šuker 53' (pen.); Vugrinec 61'	Report	Albani (yellow card) 11'	Stadium: Stadion Varteks; Attendance: 7,000; Referee: Oleg Timofeev (Estonia); Assistant referees: Heigo Niilop (Estonia); Are Habicht (Estonia)

6 June 2001 2002 World Cup qualif, Gr 6	Latvia	0–1	Croatia	Riga, Latvia
	Isakovs (yellow card) 21'; Laizāns (yellow card) 41'; Astafjevs (yellow card) 49'; Štolcers (red card) 73'	Report	Balaban 39'; Prosinečki (yellow card) 72'	Stadium: Skonto Stadium; Attendance: 4,000; Referee: John McDermott (Republic of Ireland); Assistant referees: John Peter Kelly (Republic of Ireland); Anthony Ryan (Republic of Ireland)

15 August 2001 Friendly	Republic of Ireland	2–2	Croatia	Dublin, Republic of Ireland
	Duff 21'; Morrison 78'	Report	Soldo (yellow card) 52'; Vugrinec 80'; Šuker 90' (pen.)	Stadium: Lansdowne Road; Attendance: 30,000; Referee: Andreas Schluchter (Switzerland); Assistant referees: Renato Salzberger (Switzerland); Antonio Caselle (Switzerland)

1 September 2001 2002 World Cup qualif, Gr 6	Scotland	0–0	Croatia	Glasgow, Scotland
	Elliott (yellow card) 22'; McCann (yellow card) 23'	Report	Soldo (yellow card) 34'; Stanić (yellow card) 65'; Tudor (yellow card) 76'	Stadium: Hampden Park; Attendance: 47,584; Referee: Ľuboš Micheľ (Slovakia); Assistant referees: Igor Šramka (Slovakia); Martin Balko (Slovakia)

5 September 2001 2002 World Cup qualif, Gr 6	San Marino	0–4	Croatia	Serravalle, San Marino
	Marani (yellow card) 32'; Zonzini (yellow card) 45'; Selva (yellow card) 52'	Report	N. Kovač (yellow card) 29' (goal) 40'; Prosinečki 48' (pen.), 90'; Šimić (yellow card) 52'; Soldo 76'	Stadium: Stadio Olimpico; Attendance: 1,387; Referee: Knud Stadsgaard (Denmark); Assistant referees: Ole Hansen (Denmark); Svend Jensen (Denmark)

6 October 2001 2002 World Cup qualif, Gr 6	Croatia	1–0	Belgium	Zagreb, Croatia
	Soldo (yellow card) 28'; Bokšić 76'; Balaban (yellow card) 76'	Report	Baseggio (yellow card) 24'	Stadium: Stadion Maksimir; Attendance: 36,077; Referee: Hellmut Krug (Germany); Assistant referees: Harry Ehing (Germany); Kurt Ertl (Germany)

10 November 2001 Friendly	South Korea	2–0	Croatia	Seoul, South Korea
	Kim Nam-il (yellow card) 32' (goal) 66'; Choi Tae-uk 63'	Report	Hrman (yellow card) 39'; Karić (yellow card) 73'	Stadium: Seoul World Cup Stadium; Attendance: 64,677; Referee: Subkhiddin Mohd Salleh (Malaysia); Assistant referees: Naoki Ezumi (Japan); Visva Nathan (Singapore)

13 November 2001 Friendly	South Korea	1–1	Croatia	Gwangju, South Korea
	Choi Yong-soo 42'; Lee Chun-soo (yellow card) 60'; Cha Du-ri (yellow card) 78'	Report	Jarni (yellow card) 50'; Živković 63'; Šarić (yellow card) 75'	Stadium: Gwangju Stadium; Attendance: 42,965; Referee: Kazuhiko Matsumura (Japan); Assistant referees: Naoki Ezumi (Japan); Yau Tak Lee (Hong Kong)

=== 2002 ===
13 February 2002 Friendly	Croatia	0–0	Bulgaria	Rijeka, Croatia
	Štimac (yellow card) 43'; Šerić (yellow card) 62'	Report		Stadium: Stadion Kantrida; Attendance: 4,000; Referee: Darko Čeferin (Slovenia); Assistant referees: Ivan Žunič (Slovenia); Andrej Kokolj (Slovenia)

27 March 2002 Friendly	Croatia	0–0	Slovenia	Zagreb, Croatia
	Andrić (yellow card) 23'; Tomas (yellow card) 42'	Report	Pavlin (yellow card) 21'	Stadium: Stadion Maksimir; Attendance: 8,000; Referee: Zsolt Szabó (Hungary); Assistant referees: János Ring (Hungary); Tibor Vámos (Hungary)

17 April 2002 Friendly	Croatia	2–0	Bosnia and Herzegovina	Zagreb, Croatia
	Olić 44'; Šuker 52' (pen.)	Report		Stadium: Stadion Maksimir; Attendance: 2,000; Referee: Stefan Messner (Austria); Assistant referees: Herbert Krenn (Austria); Michael Robitsch (Austria)

8 May 2002 Friendly	Hungary	0–2	Croatia	Pécs, Hungary
		Report	Dárdai 12' (o.g.); Leko (yellow card) 17'; N. Kovač 24' (yellow card) 72'	Stadium: Stadion PMFC; Attendance: 8,000; Referee: Fritz Stuchlik (Austria); Assistant referees: Wojciech Gorgon (Austria); Alain Hoxha (Austria)

3 June 2002 2002 World Cup, Gr G	Croatia	0–1	Mexico	Niigata, Japan
	Živković (red card) 59'	Report	Blanco 60' (pen.)	Stadium: Big Swan; Attendance: 32,239; Referee: Lu Jun (China); Assistant referees: Komaleeswaran Sankar (India); Taoufik Adjengui (Tunisia); Fourth official: Falla Ndoye (Senegal)

8 June 2002 2002 World Cup, Gr G	Italy	1–2	Croatia	Kashima, Japan
	Vieri (yellow card) 51' (goal) 55'	Report	R. Kovač (yellow card) 39'; Olić 73'; Rapaić 76'	Stadium: Kashima; Attendance: 36,472; Referee: Graham Poll (England); Assistant referees: Jens Larsen (Denmark); Philip Sharp (England); Fourth official: William Mattus (Costa Rica)

13 June 2002 2002 World Cup, Gr G	Ecuador	1–0	Croatia	Yokohama, Japan
	Méndez 48'; Chalá (yellow card) 86'	Report	Tomas (yellow card) 72'; Šimunić (yellow card) 90+2'	Stadium: International Stadium; Attendance: 65,862; Referee: William Mattus (Costa Rica); Assistant referees: Miguel Giacomuzzi (Paraguay); Roland Van Nylen (Belgium); Fourth official: Mark Shield (Australia)

21 August 2002 Friendly	Croatia	1–1	Wales	Varaždin, Croatia
	Petrić 79'	Report	Davies 11'; Hartson (yellow card) 16'; Delaney (yellow card) 32'	Stadium: Stadion Varteks; Attendance: 4,000; Referee: Lutz Michael Fröhlich (Germany); Assistant referees: Stefan Trautmann (Germany); Olaf Blumenstein (Germany)

7 September 2002 Euro 2004 qualif, Gr 8	Croatia	0–0	Estonia	Osijek, Croatia
	Babić (yellow card) 63'; Živković (yellow card) 71'	Report	Zelinski (yellow card) 50'; Rooba (yellow card) 79'; Allas (yellow card) 90'	Stadium: Stadion Gradski vrt Attendance: 10,000; Referee: Juan Fernández Marín (Spain); Assistant referees: Rafael Guerrero Alonso (Spain); Antonio Cardos Peterna (Spain)

12 October 2002 Euro 2004 qualif, Gr 8	Bulgaria	2–0	Croatia	Sofia, Bulgaria
	S. Petrov 22'; Berbatov (yellow card) 37' (goal) 37'; Balakov (yellow card) 76'; G. Petrov (yellow card) 87'	Report	Leko (yellow card) 13'; Tudor (yellow card) 75'; Stanić (yellow card) 78'	Stadium: Vasil Levski; Attendance: 43,200; Referee: Anders Frisk (Sweden); Assistant referees: Kenneth Petersson (Sweden); Leif Lindberg (Sweden)

20 November 2002 Friendly	Romania	0–1	Croatia	Timișoara, Romania
	Pancu (yellow card) 32'	Report	Marić 47'; Leko (yellow card) 63'	Stadium: Stadionul Dan Păltinișanu; Attendance: 36,000; Referee: János Megyebíró (Hungary); Assistant referees: Nicușor Asandei (Romania); Ion Mureșan (Romania)

=== 2003 ===
9 February 2003 Friendly	Croatia	2–2	Macedonia	Šibenik, Croatia
	Marić 32' (pen.); Tokić (yellow card) 60'; Andrić 71'	Report	Sedloski 10' (pen.) (yellow card) 40'; Hristovski (yellow card) 29'; Toleski 60'	Stadium: Stadion Šubićevac; Attendance: 1,522; Referee: Siniša Zrnić (Bosnia and Herzegovina); Assistant referees: Mujo Tutun (Bosnia and Herzegovina); Vladimir Dominiković (Bosnia and Herzegovina)

12 February 2003 2003 Marjan Trophy	Croatia	0–0	Poland	Split, Croatia
	Tomas (yellow card) 68'	Report	Głowacki (yellow card) 52'	Stadium: Stadion Poljud; Attendance: 1,000; Referee: Franz-Xaver Wack (Germany); Assistant referees: Markus Scheibel (Germany); Felix Brych (Germany)

29 March 2003 Euro 2004 qualif, Gr 8	Croatia	4–0	Belgium	Zagreb, Croatia
	Srna 9'; Roso (yellow card) 26'; Pršo 55'; Marić 70'; Leko 76'	Report	De Cock (yellow card) 20'; Deflandre (yellow card) 70'	Stadium: Stadion Maksimir; Attendance: 18,117; Referee: Herbert Fandel (Germany); Assistant referees: Harald Sather (Germany); Jan-Hendrik Salver (Germany)

2 April 2003 Euro 2004 qualif, Gr 8	Croatia	2–0	Andorra	Varaždin, Croatia
	Rapaić 10' (pen.), 43'; Tudor (yellow card) 63'; N. Kovač (yellow card) 73'	Report	Jonas (yellow card) 10'	Stadium: Stadion Varteks; Attendance: 8,290; Referee: Mircea Salomir (Romania); Assistant referees: Dan Lăzărescu (Romania); George Vidan (Romania)

30 April 2003 Friendly	Sweden	1–2	Croatia	Stockholm, Sweden
	Ibrahimović 33'	Report	Olić 6'; Živković 58'; Leko (yellow card) 88'	Stadium: Råsunda Stadium; Attendance: 20,000; Referee: Dick van Egmond (Netherlands); Assistant referees: Arie Brink (Netherlands); Wijnand Rutgers (Netherlands)

11 June 2003 Euro 2004 qualif, Gr 8	Estonia	0–1	Croatia	Tallinn, Estonia
	Kristal (yellow card) 20'; Piiroja (yellow card) 38'	Report	Šimić (yellow card) 12'; Srna (yellow card) 32'; Živković (yellow card) 66'; N. Kovač 76'; Olić (yellow card) 90+3'	Stadium: A. Le Coq Arena; Attendance: 5,000; Referee: Alain Hamer (Luxembourg); Assistant referees: Henri Reuter (Luxembourg); Francis Crelo (Luxembourg)

20 August 2003 Friendly	England	3–1	Croatia	Ipswich, England
	Beckham 9' (pen.); Owen 51'; Gerrard (yellow card) 68'; Lampard 80'	Report	N. Kovač (yellow card) 11'; R. Kovač (yellow card) 63'; Mornar 77'	Stadium: Portman Road; Attendance: 28,700; Referee: Claus Bo Larsen (Denmark); Assistant referees: Ole Hansen (Denmark); Finn Rasmussen (Denmark)

6 September 2003 Euro 2004 qualif, Gr 8	Andorra	0–3	Croatia	Andorra la Vella, Andorra
	González (yellow card) 12'; Ramirez (yellow card) 18'; Sonejee (yellow card) 67'	Report	N. Kovač 5'; Šimunić 17'; Leko (yellow card) 32'; Roso 71'; R. Kovač (yellow card) 78'; Tomas (yellow card) 87'	Stadium: Estadi Comunal; Attendance: 1,000; Referee: Miroslav Liba (Czech Republic); Assistant referees: Evžen Amler (Czech Republic); Patrik Filípek (Czech Republic)

10 September 2003 Euro 2004 qualif, Gr 8	Belgium	2–1	Croatia	Brussels, Belgium
	Van Buyten (yellow card) 18'; Sonck 35', 43'; Martens (yellow card) 90'	Report	Mornar (yellow card) 4'; Šimić 36'; Živković (yellow card) 68'; Šimunić (yellow card) 18' (yellow card) 72' (red card); Tomas (yellow card) 75'; N. Kovač (yellow card) 83'	Stadium: King Baudouin Stadium; Attendance: 30,000; Referee: Graham Poll (England); Assistant referees: Philip Sharp (England); Darren Drysdale (England)

11 October 2003 Euro 2004 qualif, Gr 8	Croatia	1–0	Bulgaria	Zagreb, Croatia
	Tudor (yellow card) 38'; R. Kovač (yellow card) 41'; Olić 48'; Leko (yellow card) 89'	Report	Dimitrov (yellow card) 14'; Krastev (yellow card) 35'; Petrov (yellow card) 82'	Stadium: Stadion Maksimir; Attendance: 35,000; Referee: Gilles Veissière (France); Assistant referees: Serge Vallin (France); Frederic Arnault (France)

15 November 2003 Euro 2004 qualif, play-off	Croatia	1–1	Slovenia	Zagreb, Croatia
	Pršo 5' (yellow card) 86'; Olić (yellow card) 32'; Neretljak (yellow card) 47'; Tomas (yellow card) 72'; Srna (yellow card) 83'	Report	Karić (yellow card) 4'; Šiljak 22' (yellow card) 32'; Šukalo (yellow card) 80'	Stadium: Stadion Maksimir; Attendance: 36,000; Referee: Markus Merk (Germany); Assistant referees: Christian Schräer (Germany); Jan-Hendrik Salver (Germany)

19 November 2003 Euro 2004 qualif, play-off	Slovenia	0–1 (1–2 agg.)	Croatia	Ljubljana, Slovenia
	Karić (yellow card) 11'	Report	Tudor (yellow card) 37' (yellow card) 59' (red card); Pršo 61'; Leko (yellow card) 90'	Stadium: Bežigrad Stadium; Attendance: 10,000; Referee: Urs Meier (Switzerland); Assistant referees: Rudolf Käppeli (Switzerland); Martin Iseli (Switzerland)

=== 2004 ===
18 February 2004 Friendly	Croatia	1–2	Germany	Split, Croatia
	Šimunić (yellow card) 43'; N. Kovač (yellow card) 55'; Neretljak 86'	Report	Klose 34'; Ramelow 90'	Stadium: Stadion Poljud; Attendance: 9,212; Referee: Peter Fröjdfeldt (Sweden); Assistant referees: Stefan Wittberg (Sweden); Ingemar Larsson (Sweden)

31 March 2004 Friendly	Croatia	2–2	Turkey	Zagreb, Croatia
	Šokota 2'; Srna 76'	Report	Balcı (yellow card) 24'; Özat (yellow card) 54'; Biryol 73'; Yelek (yellow card) 75'; Atan 78'	Stadium: Stadion Maksimir; Attendance: 12,000; Referee: João Ferreira (Portugal); Assistant referees: João Ferreira dos Santos (Portugal); Luís Miguel Cordas Tavares (Portugal)

28 April 2004 Friendly	Macedonia	0–1	Croatia	Skopje, Macedonia
	Stojanoski (yellow card) 36'; Šumulikoski (yellow card) 70'	Report	Klasnić 34'; Tokić (yellow card) 35'; Didulica (yellow card) 75'	Stadium: Gradski stadion Attendance: 15,000; Referee: İsmet Arzuman (Turkey); Assistant referees: Bahattin Duran (Turkey); Serkan Ok (Turkey)

29 May 2004 Friendly	Croatia	1–0	Slovakia	Rijeka, Croatia
	Olić 29'; Agić (yellow card) 89'	Report		Stadium: Stadion Kantrida; Attendance: 7,000; Referee: Viktor Kassai (Hungary); Assistant referees: Attila Kelemen (Hungary); Gábor Erős (Hungary)

5 June 2004 Friendly	Denmark	1–2	Croatia	Copenhagen, Denmark
	Sand 56'	Report	Šokota 27'; Bjelica (yellow card) 31'; Olić 39'; Živković (yellow card) 60'	Stadium: Parken Stadium; Attendance: 30,843; Referee: Fritz Stuchlik (Austria); Assistant referees: Wojciech Gorgon (Austria); Gerald Kainz (Austria)

13 June 2004 Euro 2004, Gr B	Switzerland	0–0	Croatia	Leiria, Portugal
	Stiel (yellow card) 73'; Vogel (yellow card) 4' (yellow card) 50' (red card); Huggel (yellow card) 41'	Report	Pršo (yellow card) 13'; Bjelica (yellow card) 30'; Rapaić (yellow card) 48'; Živković (yellow card) 51'; Mornar (yellow card) 52'	Stadium: Estádio Dr. Magalhães Pessoa; Attendance: 24,090; Referee: Lucílio Batista (Portugal); Assistant referees: Paulo Jorge Januário Leite Ribeiro (Portugal); José Cardinal (Portugal); Fourth official: Terje Hauge (Norway)

17 June 2004 Euro 2004, Gr B	Croatia	2–2	France	Leiria, Portugal
	Tudor (yellow card) 39'; Rapaić 48' (pen.); Pršo 52'; Roso (yellow card) 61'; R. Kovač (yellow card) 64'; Leko (yellow card) 78'	Report	Tudor 22' (o.g.); Vieira (yellow card) 32'; Dacourt (yellow card) 60'; Trezeguet 64'	Stadium: Estádio Dr. Magalhães Pessoa; Attendance: 29,160; Referee: Kim Milton Nielsen (Denmark); Assistant referees: Jens Larsen (Denmark); Jørgen Jepsen (Denmark); Fourth official: Anders Frisk (Sweden)

21 June 2004 Euro 2004, Gr B	Croatia	2–4	England	Lisbon, Portugal
	N. Kovač 5'; Šimić (yellow card) 63'; Tudor 73'	Report	Scholes 40'; Rooney 40+1' (pen.), 68'; Lampard 79'	Stadium: Estádio da Luz; Attendance: 57,047; Referee: Pierluigi Collina (Italy); Assistant referees: Marco Ivaldi (Italy); Narciso Pisacreta (Italy); Fourth official: Manuel Mejuto González (Spain)

18 August 2004 Friendly	Croatia	1–0	Israel	Varaždin, Croatia
	Šimunić 29'; Balaban (yellow card) 65'; Leko (yellow card) 76'	Report	Golan (yellow card) 70'; Ben Haim (yellow card) 79'; Nimni (yellow card) 80'; Afek (yellow card) 82'; Badir (yellow card) 83'	Stadium: Stadion Varteks; Attendance: 8,000; Referee: Jacek Granat (Poland); Assistant referees: Sławomir Stempniewski (Poland); Dariusz Wardak (Poland)

4 September 2004 2006 World Cup qualif, Gr 8	Croatia	3–0	Hungary	Zagreb, Croatia
	Kranjčar (yellow card) 15'; Pršo 32'; Klasnić 57'; Gyepes 80' (o.g.)	Report	Simek (yellow card) 7'; Huszti (red card) 11'; Gera (yellow card) 21'; Bodnár (yellow card) 22'; Rósa (yellow card) 51'; Molnár (yellow card) 83'	Stadium: Stadion Maksimir; Attendance: 20,853; Referee: Mike Riley (England); Assistant referees: David Babski (England); Glenn Turner (England)

8 September 2004 2006 World Cup qualif, Gr 8	Sweden	0–1	Croatia	Gothenburg, Sweden
	Jonson (yellow card) 86'	Report	R. Kovač (yellow card) 34'; Srna 64'; Babić (yellow card) 72'; Leko (yellow card) 79'; Šimunić (yellow card) 86'; Vranješ (yellow card) 89'	Stadium: Nya Ullevi; Attendance: 40,023; Referee: Arturo Daudén Ibáñez (Spain); Assistant referees: Clemente Ayete Plou (Spain); Juan Carlos Yuste Jiménez (Spain)

9 October 2004 2006 World Cup qualif, Gr 8	Croatia	2–2	Bulgaria	Zagreb, Croatia
	Srna 15', 31' (pen.) (yellow card) 60'; R. Kovač (yellow card) 74'; Babić (yellow card) 84'	Report	Kishishev (yellow card) 54'; Yanev (yellow card) 66'; M. Petrov 78' (yellow card) 84'; Berbatov 86'	Stadium: Stadion Maksimir; Attendance: 31,565; Referee: Pierluigi Collina (Italy); Assistant referees: Marco Ivaldi (Italy); Claudio Puglisi (Italy)

16 November 2004 Friendly	Republic of Ireland	1–0	Croatia	Dublin, Ireland
	Keane 24'	Report		Stadium: Lansdowne Road; Attendance: 42,300; Referee: Gylfi Þór Orrason (Iceland); Assistant referees: Gunnar Gylfason (Iceland); Guðmundur Jónsson (Iceland)

=== 2005 ===
9 February 2005 Friendly	Israel	3–3	Croatia	Jerusalem, Israel
	Balili 39'; Benayoun 76'; Golan 85'	Report	Klasnić 15', 79'; Srna 56' (pen.)	Stadium: Teddy Kollek; Attendance: 6,000; Referee: Panikos Kailis (Cyprus); Assistant referees: Erez Zatelman (Israel); Shmuel Shteif (Israel)

26 March 2005 2006 World Cup qualif, Gr 8	Croatia	4–0	Iceland	Zagreb, Croatia
	Pršo (yellow card) 27' (goal) 90'; N. Kovač 40', 75' (yellow card) 55'; Šimunić 71' (yellow card) 86'; Srna (yellow card) 83'; Leko (yellow card) 90'	Report	Helguson (yellow card) 31'; I. Sigurðsson (yellow card) 38'	Stadium: Stadion Maksimir; Attendance: 17,912; Referee: Jerome Damon (South Africa); Assistant referees: Tshotleno Enock Molefe (South Africa); Justice Yeboah (Ghana)

30 March 2005 2006 World Cup qualif, Gr 8	Croatia	3–0	Malta	Zagreb, Croatia
	Pršo 23', 35'; Tudor 80'	Report	Agius (yellow card) 19'; Mattock (yellow card) 62'	Stadium: Stadion Maksimir; Attendance: 15,510; Referee: Costas Kapitanis (Cyprus); Assistant referees: Frixos Petrou (Cyprus); Andreas Xanthou (Cyprus)

4 June 2005 2006 World Cup qualif, Gr 8	Bulgaria	1–3	Croatia	Sofia, Bulgaria
	Stoyanov (yellow card) 20'; Berbatov (yellow card) 41'; M. Petrov 73'	Report	Olić (yellow card) 16'; Babić 18'; Tudor (yellow card) 30' (goal) 58'; R. Kovač (yellow card) 42'; Kranjčar 80'	Stadium: Vasil Levski; Attendance: 43,200; Referee: Kim Milton Nielsen (Denmark); Assistant referees: Jørgen Jepsen (Denmark); Torben Jensen (Denmark)

17 August 2005 Friendly	Croatia	1–1	Brazil	Split, Croatia
	Kranjčar 32'	Report	Ricardinho 42'; Luisão (yellow card) 72'	Stadium: Stadion Poljud; Attendance: 27,256; Referee: Florian Meyer (Germany); Assistant referees: Sönke Glindemann (Germany); Heiner Müller (Germany)

3 September 2005 2006 World Cup qualif, Gr 8	Iceland	1–3	Croatia	Reykjavík, Iceland
	Guðjohnsen 24'; Þorvaldsson (yellow card) 25'; Helgason (yellow card) 42'; Gunnarsson (yellow card) 60'; K. Sigurðsson (yellow card) 72'	Report	Šimunić (yellow card) 8'; Srna (yellow card) 38' (goal) 82' (pen.); R. Kovač (yellow card) 52'; Balaban 56', 64'; Tudor (yellow card) 60'	Stadium: Laugardalsvöllur; Attendance: 5,520; Referee: Wolfgang Stark (Germany); Assistant referees: Harald Sather (Germany); Markus Scheibel (Germany)

7 September 2005 2006 World Cup qualif, Gr 8	Malta	1–1	Croatia	Attard, Malta
	Agius (yellow card) 20'; Wellman 78'; Sammut (yellow card) 78'; Grima (yellow card) 90'	Report	Kranjčar 19'; Babić (yellow card) 44'; Tokić (yellow card) 53' (yellow card) 90' (red card)	Stadium: Ta' Qali; Attendance: 916; Referee: Athanassios Briakos (Greece); Assistant referees: Konstantinos Dallas (Greece); Dimitris Tsortanidis (Greece)

8 October 2005 2006 World Cup qualif, Gr 8	Croatia	1–0	Sweden	Zagreb, Croatia
	N. Kovač (yellow card) 15'; Kranjčar (yellow card) 39'; Srna 56' (pen.)	Report	Edman (yellow card) 23'	Stadium: Stadion Maksimir; Attendance: 34,015; Referee: Massimo De Santis (Italy); Assistant referees: Marco Ivaldi (Italy); Alessandro Griselli (Italy)

12 October 2005 2006 World Cup qualif, Gr 8	Hungary	0–0	Croatia	Budapest, Hungary
	Stark (yellow card) 4'	Report	Tomas (yellow card) 59'	Stadium: Szusza Ferenc Stadion; Attendance: 6,979; Referee: Claus Bo Larsen (Denmark); Assistant referees: Bill Rene Hansen (Denmark); Anders Norrestrand (Denmark)

12 November 2005 Friendly	Portugal	2–0	Croatia	Coimbra, Portugal
	Petit 32'; Pauleta 65'	Report	R. Kovač (yellow card) 37'; Leko (yellow card) 40'	Stadium: Estadio Municipal de Coimbra; Attendance: 16,370; Referee: Kim Milton Nielsen (Denmark); Assistant referees: Jørgen Jepsen (Denmark); Torben Jensen (Denmark)

=== 2006 ===
29 January 2006 2006 Lunar New Year Cup	South Korea	2–0	Croatia	Hong Kong, China
	Kim Dong-jin 36'; Lee Chun-soo 50'; Baek Ji-hoon (yellow card) 88'	Report	Leko (yellow card) 27'	Stadium: Hong Kong Stadium; Attendance: 16,841; Referee: Wong Chi Tang (Hong Kong); Assistant referees: Ming Fai Poon (Hong Kong); Chi Ming Yeung (Hong Kong)

1 February 2006 2006 Lunar New Year Cup	Hong Kong	0–4	Croatia	Hong Kong, China
	Poon Yiu Cheuk (yellow card) 31'	Report	Knežević 15'; Benko (yellow card) 25'; Leko 29'; Eduardo 64'; Bošnjak 72'	Stadium: Hong Kong Stadium; Attendance: 13,971; Referee: Masaaki Iemoto (Japan); Assistant referees: Yim Yau Cheung (Hong Kong); Siu Chuen Lui (Hong Kong)

1 March 2006 Friendly	Argentina	2–3	Croatia	Basel, Switzerland
	Tevez 4'; Messi 6'	Report	Klasnić 3'; Srna (yellow card) 50' (goal) 52'; Tudor (yellow card) 87'; Šimić 90'	Stadium: St. Jakob-Park; Attendance: 15,000; Referee: Markus Nobs (Switzerland); Assistant referees: Rudolf Käppeli (Switzerland); Stéphane Cuhat (Switzerland)

23 May 2006 Friendly	Austria	1–4	Croatia	Vienna, Austria
	Ivanschitz 14'	Report	Klasnić 11', 35'; Babić 55'; Balaban 69'	Stadium: Ernst-Happel-Stadion; Attendance: 22,000; Referee: Herbert Fandel (Germany); Assistant referees: Heiner Müller (Germany); Carsten Kadach (Germany)

28 May 2006 Friendly	Croatia	2–2	Iran	Osijek, Croatia
	Pršo 31'; Babić 90' (pen.)	Report	Karimi 21'; Borhani 82'	Stadium: Stadion Gradski vrt Attendance: 20,000; Referee: Željko Širić (Croatia); Assistant referees: Predrag Borovec (Croatia); Tomislav Šetka (Croatia)

3 June 2006 Friendly	Croatia	0–1	Poland	Wolfsburg, Germany
		Report	Smolarek 54'; Rasiak (yellow card) 90'	Stadium: Volkswagen Arena; Attendance: 10,000; Referee: Florian Meyer (Germany); Assistant referees: Carsten Kadach (Germany); Holger Henschel (Germany)

7 June 2006 Friendly	Spain	2–1	Croatia	Geneva, Switzerland
	Pernía 62'; Torres 90'	Report	Kranjčar 14'	Stadium: Stade de Genève; Attendance: 15,000; Referee: Stéphane Lannoy (France); Assistant referees: Patrick Reinbold (France); Éric Dansault (France)

13 June 2006 2006 World Cup, Gr F	Brazil	1–0	Croatia	Berlin, Germany
	Emerson (yellow card) 42'; Kaká 44'	Report	N. Kovač (yellow card) 32'; R. Kovač (yellow card) 67'; Tudor (yellow card) 90'	Stadium: Olympiastadion; Attendance: 72,000; Referee: Benito Archundia (Mexico); Assistant referees: José Ramírez Díaz (Mexico); Héctor Vergara (Canada); Fourth official: Mohammed Guezzaz (Morocco)

18 June 2006 2006 World Cup, Gr F	Japan	0–0	Croatia	Nuremberg, Germany
	Miyamoto (yellow card) 21'; Kawaguchi (yellow card) 42'; Santos (yellow card) 72'	Report	R. Kovač (yellow card) 32'; Srna (yellow card) 69'	Stadium: Frankenstadion; Attendance: 41,000; Referee: Frank De Bleeckere (Belgium); Assistant referees: Peter Hermans (Belgium); Walter Vromans (Belgium); Fourth official: Kevin Stott (United States)

22 June 2006 2006 World Cup, Gr F	Croatia	2–2	Australia	Stuttgart, Germany
	Srna 2'; Šimić (yellow card) 32' (yellow-red card) 85'; Tudor (yellow card) 39'; N. Kovač 56'; Šimunić (yellow card) 61' (yellow card) 90' (yellow-red card) 90+3'; Pletikosa (yellow card) 70'	Report	Moore 38' (pen.); Kewell 79'; Emerton (yellow card) 81' (yellow-red card) 87'	Stadium: Gottlieb-Daimler-Stadion; Attendance: 52,000; Referee: Graham Poll (England); Assistant referees: Philip Sharp (England); Glenn Turner (England); Fourth official: Kevin Stott (United States)

16 August 2006 Friendly	Italy	0–2	Croatia	Livorno, Italy
	Terlizzi (yellow card) 36'; Liverani (yellow card) 36'; Chiellini (yellow card) 74'	Report	Eduardo (yellow card) 21' (goal) 28'; Srna (yellow card) 36'; Modrić 42'; Leko (yellow card) 50'; Petrić (yellow card) 90'	Stadium: Stadio Armando Picchi; Attendance: 16,150; Referee: Knut Kircher (Germany); Assistant referees: Wolfgang Walz (Germany); Thorsten Schiffner (Germany)

6 September 2006 Euro 2008 qualif, Gr E	Russia	0–0	Croatia	Moscow, Russia
	Aldonin (yellow card) 68'	Report		Stadium: Lokomotiv Stadium; Attendance: 30,000; Referee: Manuel Mejuto González (Spain); Assistant referees: Juan Carlos Yuste Jiménez (Spain); Pedro Medina Hernández (Spain); Fourth official: Alfonso Pino Zamorano (Spain)

7 October 2006 Euro 2008 qualif, Gr E	Croatia	7–0	Andorra	Zagreb, Croatia
	Petrić 14', 38', 48', 50'; Klasnić 57'; Balaban 62'; Modrić 83'	Report	García (yellow card) 31'; Toscano (yellow card) 65'; Fernández (yellow card) 87'	Stadium: Stadion Maksimir; Attendance: 20,000; Referee: Anthony Zammit (Malta); Assistant referees: Philip Agius (Malta); Konrad Borg (Malta); Fourth official: Joseph Attard (Malta)

11 October 2006 Euro 2008 qualif, Gr E	Croatia	2–0	England	Zagreb, Croatia
	N. Kovač (yellow card) 63'; Eduardo 59'; Neville 65' (o.g.)	Report	Ferdinand (yellow card) 20'; Cole (yellow card) 76'	Stadium: Stadion Maksimir; Attendance: 38,000; Referee: Roberto Rosetti (Italy); Assistant referees: Marco Ivaldi (Italy); Paolo Calcagno (Italy); Fourth official: Paolo Bertini (Italy)

15 November 2006 Euro 2008 qualif, Gr E	Israel	3–4	Croatia	Ramat Gan, Israel
	Colautti 8', 88' (yellow card) 40'; Aouate (yellow card) 34'; Tal (yellow card) 60'; Benayoun 67'	Report	Srna 34' (pen.); Eduardo 38', 53', 72'	Stadium: Ramat Gan Stadium; Attendance: 38,000; Referee: Eduardo Iturralde González (Spain); Assistant referees: Rafael Guerrero Alonso (Spain); Jesús Calvo Guadamuro (Spain); Fourth official: (Spain)

=== 2007 ===
7 February 2007 Friendly	Croatia	2–1	Norway	Rijeka, Croatia
	Petrić 26'; Modrić 38'; Ćorluka (yellow card) 55'	Report	Johnsen (yellow card) 26'; Moen 86'	Stadium: Stadion Kantrida; Attendance: 8,000; Referee: Philippe Kalt (France); Assistant referees: Christophe Capelli (France); Fabrice Meslin (France)

24 March 2007 Euro 2008 qualif, Gr E	Croatia	2–1	Macedonia	Zagreb, Croatia
	Srna 58'; Eduardo 87'	Report	Sedloski (yellow card) 8' (goal) 36' (yellow card) 68' (red card); Šumulikoski (yellow card) 46'; Naumoski (yellow card) 47'; Pandev (yellow card) 67'	Stadium: Stadion Maksimir; Attendance: 30,000; Referee: Konrad Plautz (Austria); Assistant referees: Markus Mayr (Austria); Andreas Fellinger (Austria); Fourth official: Thomas Einwaller (Austria)

2 June 2007 Euro 2008 qualif, Gr E	Estonia	0–1	Croatia	Tallinn, Estonia
	Poom (yellow card) 67'; Piiroja (yellow card) 37'; Dmitrijev (yellow card) 55'; Klavan (yellow card) 90'	Report	Eduardo 32'; Šimunić (yellow card) 38'	Stadium: A. Le Coq Arena; Attendance: 10,000; Referee: Viktor Kassai (Hungary); Assistant referees: Tibor Vámos (Hungary); Gábor Erős (Hungary); Fourth official: Ferenc Bede (Hungary)

6 June 2007 Euro 2008 qualif, Gr E	Croatia	0–0	Russia	Zagreb, Croatia
	Leko (yellow card) 72'	Report	Torbinski (yellow card) 69'; Saenko (yellow card) 71'	Stadium: Stadion Maksimir; Attendance: 35,000; Referee: Ľuboš Micheľ (Slovakia); Assistant referees: Martin Balko (Slovakia); Roman Csabay (Slovakia); Fourth official: Pavel Olšiak (Slovakia)

22 August 2007 Friendly	Bosnia and Herzegovina	3–5	Croatia	Sarajevo, Bosnia and Herzegovina
	Muslimović 40', 70', 77'; Ibišević (yellow card) 90'	Report	Eduardo 18'; Srna 35' 74'; Petrić (yellow card) 58'; Ćorluka (yellow card) 69'; N. Kovač 72', 81'; R. Kovač (yellow card) 90'	Stadium: Asim Ferhatović; Attendance: 18,000; Referee: Damir Skomina (Slovenia); Assistant referees: Marko Stančin (Slovenia); Primož Arhar (Slovenia)

8 September 2007 Euro 2008 qualif, Gr E	Croatia	2–0	Estonia	Zagreb, Croatia
	Eduardo 39', 45+1' (pen.)	Report	Allas (yellow card) 19'	Stadium: Stadion Maksimir; Attendance: 20,000; Referee: Jérôme Laperrière (Switzerland); Assistant referees: Stéphane Cuhat (Switzerland); Jean-Paul Rémy (Switzerland); Fourth official: Carlo Bertolini (Switzerland)

12 September 2007 Euro 2008 qualif, Gr E	Andorra	0–6	Croatia	Andorra la Vella, Andorra
	Sivera (yellow card) 33'; Lima (yellow card) 63'; García (red card) 77'	Report	Srna 34'; Petrić 38', 44'; Kranjčar 49'; Eduardo 55'	Stadium: Estadi Comunal; Attendance: 1,000; Referee: Olivier Thual (France); Assistant referees: Christophe Capelli (France); Éric Castellani (France); Fourth official: Philippe Kalt (France)

13 October 2007 Euro 2008 qualif, Gr E	Croatia	1–0	Israel	Zagreb, Croatia
	Leko (yellow card) 24'; Eduardo (yellow card) 45' (goal) 52'	Report	Balili (yellow card) 62'; Ben Haim (yellow card) 65'; Cohen (yellow card) 71'; Antebi (yellow card) 87'	Stadium: Stadion Maksimir; Attendance: 30,000; Referee: Wolfgang Stark (Germany); Assistant referees: Carsten Kadach (Germany); Peter Henes (Germany); Fourth official: Florian Meyer (Germany)

16 October 2007 Friendly	Croatia	3–0	Slovakia	Rijeka, Croatia
	Olić 45', 69'; Vukojević 48'	Report		Stadium: Stadion Kantrida; Attendance: 6,000; Referee: Jérôme Laperrière (Switzerland); Assistant referees: Francesco Buragina (Switzerland); Stefan Bühlmann (Switzerland)

17 November 2007 Euro 2008 qualif, Gr E	Macedonia	2–0	Croatia	Skopje, Macedonia
	Tasevski (yellow card) 14'; Naumoski (yellow card) 27' (goal) 83'; Maznov 71'	Report		Stadium: Gradski stadion Attendance: 15,000; Referee: Frank De Bleeckere (Belgium); Assistant referees: Peter Hermans (Belgium); Danny Huens (Belgium); Fourth official: Paul Allaerts (Belgium)

21 November 2007 Euro 2008 qualif, Gr E	England	2–3	Croatia	London, England
	Lampard 56' (pen.); Crouch 65'	Report	Kranjčar 8'; Olić 14'; R. Kovač (yellow card) 32'; Eduardo (yellow card) 50'; Petrić 77'	Stadium: Wembley Stadium; Attendance: 88,091; Referee: Peter Fröjdfeldt (Sweden); Assistant referees: Kenneth Petersson (Sweden); Stefan Wittberg (Sweden); Fourth official: Martin Ingvarsson (Sweden)

=== 2008 ===
6 February 2008 Friendly	Croatia	0–3	Netherlands	Split, Croatia
	Ćorluka (yellow card) 20'; Srna (yellow card) 53'; R. Kovač (yellow card) 54'	Report	Heitinga 9'; Huntelaar 37' (yellow card) 62'; De Zeeuw (yellow card) 73'; Vennegoor of Hesselink 89'	Stadium: Stadion Poljud; Attendance: 30,000; Referee: César Muñiz Fernández (Spain); Assistant referees: Pedro Medina Hernández (Spain); José Fernández Miranda (Spain)

26 March 2008 Friendly	Scotland	1–1	Croatia	Glasgow, Scotland
	Miller 31'; Brown (yellow card) 43'; McManus (yellow card) 55'; Naysmith (yellow card) 59'	Report	Kranjčar 10'; N. Kovač (yellow card) 45'; R. Kovač (yellow card) 57'; Vukojević (yellow card) 87'; Šimunić (yellow card) 90'	Stadium: Hampden Park; Attendance: 28,821; Referee: Terje Hauge (Norway); Assistant referees: Steinar Holvik (Norway); Jan Petter Randen (Norway)

24 May 2008 Friendly	Croatia	1–0	Moldova	Rijeka, Croatia
	N. Kovač 30'; R. Kovač (yellow card) 37'; Vukojević (yellow card) 72'	Report	Golovatenco (yellow card) 84'	Stadium: Stadion Kantrida; Attendance: 8,000; Referee: Darko Čeferin (Slovenia); Assistant referees: Andrej Kokolj (Slovenia); Bojan Ul (Slovenia)

31 May 2008 Friendly	Hungary	1–1	Croatia	Budapest, Hungary
	Gera (yellow card) 31'; Vaskó 44'; Hajnal (yellow card) 78'	Report	N. Kovač 24'; Pranjić (yellow card) 73'	Stadium: Szusza Ferenc Stadion; Attendance: 6,979; Referee: Damien Ledentu (France); Assistant referees: Philippe Larose (France); Éric Dansault (France)

8 June 2008 Euro 2008, Gr B	Austria	0–1	Croatia	Vienna, Austria
	Pogatetz (yellow card) 3'; Säumel (yellow card) 21'; Prödl (yellow card) 68'	Report	Modrić 4' (pen.); R. Kovač (yellow card) 51'	Stadium: Ernst-Happel-Stadion; Attendance: 51,428; Referee: Pieter Vink (Netherlands); Assistant referees: Adriaan Inia (Netherlands); Hans ten Hoove (Netherlands); Fourth official: Kristinn Jakobsson (Iceland)

12 June 2008 Euro 2008, Gr B	Croatia	2–1	Germany	Klagenfurt, Austria
	Srna 24' (yellow card) 27'; Šimunić (yellow card) 45+1'; Olić 62'; Leko (yellow card) 90+2'; Modrić (yellow card) 90+3'	Report	Ballack (yellow card) 75'; Podolski 79'; Lehmann (yellow card) 90+2'; Schweinsteiger (red card) 90+2'	Stadium: Wörthersee Stadion; Attendance: 30,461; Referee: Frank De Bleeckere (Belgium); Assistant referees: Peter Hermans (Belgium); Alex Verstraeten (Belgium); Fourth official: Stéphane Lannoy (France)

16 June 2008 Euro 2008, Gr B	Poland	0–1	Croatia	Klagenfurt, Austria
	Lewandowski (yellow card) 38'; Zahorski (yellow card) 84'	Report	Vejić (yellow card) 45'; Klasnić 53'; Vukojević (yellow card) 85'	Stadium: Wörthersee Stadion; Attendance: 30,461; Referee: Kyros Vassaras (Greece); Assistant referees: Dimitrios Bozatzidis (Greece); Dimitrios Saraidaris (Greece); Fourth official: Olegário Benquerença (Portugal)

20 June 2008 Euro 2008, quarterfinal	Croatia	1–1 (a.e.t.) (1–3 p)	Turkey	Vienna, Austria
	Klasnić 119'	Report	Tuncay (yellow card) 27'; Turan (yellow card) 49'; Boral (yellow card) 89'; Aşık (yellow card) 107'; Şentürk 120+2'	Stadium: Ernst-Happel-Stadion; Attendance: 51,428; Referee: Roberto Rosetti (Italy); Assistant referees: Alessandro Griselli (Italy); Paolo Calcagno (Italy); Fourth official: Manuel Mejuto González (Spain)
	Penalties
	Modrić (penalty missed); Srna (penalty scored); Rakitić (penalty missed); Petrić (penalty missed)		(penalty scored) Turan; (penalty scored) Şentürk; (penalty scored) Altıntop

20 August 2008 Friendly	Slovenia	2–3	Croatia	Maribor, Slovenia
	Šuler 4'; Jokić (yellow card) 51'; Šišić 55' (pen.)	Report	Leko (yellow card) 31'; Rakitić 37', 64' (yellow card) 88'; Vukojević (yellow card) 55'; Srna 59' (pen.)	Stadium: Ljudski vrt Attendance: 11,100; Referee: Claudio Circhetta (Switzerland); Assistant referees: Raffael Zeder (Switzerland); Devis Dettamanti (Switzerland)

6 September 2008 2010 World Cup qualif, Gr 6	Croatia	3–0	Kazakhstan	Zagreb, Croatia
	N. Kovač 13'; Modrić 35'; R. Kovač (yellow card) 77'; Petrić 79'	Report	Irismetov (yellow card) 25'; Chichulin (yellow card) 90'	Stadium: Stadion Maksimir; Attendance: 17,424; Referee: Stefan Johannesson (Sweden); Assistant referees: Stefan Wittberg (Sweden); Peter Ekström (Sweden)

10 September 2008 2010 World Cup qualif, Gr 6	Croatia	1–4	England	Zagreb, Croatia
	Šimunić (yellow card) 39'; Srna (yellow card) 47'; R. Kovač (red card) 53'; Mandžukić 78'	Report	Walcott 27', 57', 81'; Heskey (yellow card) 61'; Rooney 63'	Stadium: Stadion Maksimir; Attendance: 35,218; Referee: Ľuboš Micheľ (Slovakia); Assistant referees: Martin Balko (Slovakia); Roman Csabay (Slovakia)

11 October 2008 2010 World Cup qualif, Gr 6	Ukraine	0–0	Croatia	Kharkiv, Ukraine
		Report	N. Kovač (yellow card) 45'; Srna (yellow card) 71'	Stadium: Oblasny SportKomplex Metalist; Attendance: 38,500; Referee: Eric Braamhaar (Netherlands); Assistant referees: Arie Brink (Netherlands); Patrick Gerritsen (Netherlands)

15 October 2008 2010 World Cup qualif, Gr 6	Croatia	4–0	Andorra	Zagreb, Croatia
	Rakitić 16', 84' (pen.); Olić 32'; Modrić 73'; Šimunić (yellow card) 85'	Report	Rodríguez (yellow card) 30'; García (yellow card) 55'; Lima (yellow card) 84'	Stadium: Stadion Maksimir; Attendance: 20,000; Referee: István Vad (Hungary); Assistant referees: Zsolt Szpisják (Hungary); György Ring (Hungary)

=== 2009 ===
11 February 2009 Friendly	Romania	1–2	Croatia	Bucharest, Romania
	Marica 22'; Bucur (yellow card) 78'	Report	Rakitić 28'; Kranjčar 75'; Srna (yellow card) 87'	Stadium: Stadionul Steaua; Attendance: 8,000; Referee: Cristian Balaj (Romania); Assistant referees: Cristian Nica (Romania); Aurel Onița (Romania)

1 April 2009 2010 World Cup qualif, Gr 6	Andorra	0–2	Croatia	Andorra la Vella, Andorra
	Lima (yellow card) 33'; Jiménez (yellow card) 57'	Report	Klasnić 15'; Eduardo (yellow card) 33' (goal) 35'	Stadium: Estadi Comunal; Attendance: 1,000; Referee: Leontios Trattou (Cyprus); Assistant referees: Andreas Papapanayiotou (Cyprus); Aristides Christou (Cyprus)

6 June 2009 2010 World Cup qualif, Gr 6	Croatia	2–2	Ukraine	Zagreb, Croatia
	Petrić 2'; Modrić 68'; Srna (yellow card) 72'; Leko (yellow card) 83'	Report	Shevchenko 13'; Seleznyov (yellow card) 23'; Gai 54'; Nazarenko (yellow card) 59'; Mandzyuk (yellow card) 80'; Kucher (yellow card) 90'	Stadium: Stadion Maksimir; Attendance: 30,000; Referee: Terje Hauge (Norway); Assistant referees: Steinar Holvik (Norway); Kim Tomas Haglund (Norway)

12 August 2009 2010 World Cup qualif, Gr 6	Belarus	1–3	Croatia	Minsk, Belarus
	Sosnovski (yellow card) 57'; Kutuzov (yellow card) 75'; Verkhawtsow 81'	Report	Olić 22', 85'; Eduardo 69'; Mandžukić (yellow card) 71'	Stadium: Dinamo Stadium; Attendance: 21,651; Referee: Felix Brych (Germany); Assistant referees: Thorsten Schiffner (Germany); Mark Borsch (Germany)

5 September 2009 2010 World Cup qualif, Gr 6	Croatia	1–0	Belarus	Zagreb, Croatia
	Rakitić 24'; Ćorluka (yellow card) 29' (yellow card) 79' (red card); Križanac (yellow card) 89'	Report	Bardachow (yellow card) 14'; Kornilenko (yellow card) 25'; Hleb (yellow card) 57'; Verkhawtsow (yellow card) 75'; Kalachev (yellow card) 89'; Kovel (yellow card) 90'	Stadium: Stadion Maksimir; Attendance: 28,000; Referee: Konrad Plautz (Austria); Assistant referees: Markus Mayr (Austria); Armin Eder (Austria)

9 September 2009 2010 World Cup qualif, Gr 6	England	5–1	Croatia	London, England
	Lampard 7' (pen.), 59'; Gerrard 18', 67'; Rooney 77'; Terry (yellow card) 85'	Report	Šimunić (yellow card) 43'; Eduardo 72'	Stadium: Wembley Stadium; Attendance: 87,319; Referee: Alberto Undiano Mallenco (Spain); Assistant referees: Juan Carlos Yuste Jiménez (Spain); Fermín Martínez (Spain)

8 October 2009 Friendly	Croatia	3–2	Qatar	Rijeka, Croatia
	Ćorluka 7'; Klasnić 11'; Vukojević (yellow card) 22'; Jelavić 90+1'	Report	Siddiq 45'; Majid (yellow card) 61'; Soria 69'	Stadium: Stadion Kantrida; Attendance: 5,000; Referee: Cristian Balaj (Romania); Assistant referees: Cristian Nica (Romania); Aurel Onița (Romania)

14 October 2009 2010 World Cup qualif, Gr 6	Kazakhstan	1–2	Croatia	Astana, Kazakhstan
	Nurgaliev (yellow card) 1'; Khizhnichenko 26'; Nusserbayev (yellow card) 77'	Report	Vukojević 10' (yellow card) 82'; Kranjčar (yellow card) 44' (goal) 90+2'; Srna (yellow card) 87'; Jelavić (yellow card) 90+4'	Stadium: Astana Arena; Attendance: 10,250; Referee: Claudio Circhetta (Switzerland); Assistant referees: Manuel Navarro (Switzerland); Beat Hidber (Switzerland)

14 November 2009 Friendly	Croatia	5–0	Liechtenstein	Vinkovci, Croatia
	Bilić 1', 49'; Srna 10'; Eduardo 23', 47'	Report		Stadium: Stadion HNK Cibalia; Attendance: 9,000; Referee: Mihály Fábián (Hungary); Assistant referees: Oszkár Lémon (Hungary); László Viszokai (Hungary)

== Record per opponent ==
More wins than losses
As many wins as losses
Fewer wins than losses

Opponent	Pld	W	D	L	GF	GA	GD	Win %
Andorra	6	6	0	0	24	0	+24	100.00
Argentina	1	1	0	0	3	2	+1	100.00
Australia	1	0	1	0	2	2	+0	0.00
Austria	4	4	0	0	8	2	+6	100.00
Belarus	2	2	0	0	4	1	+3	100.00
Belgium	4	2	1	1	6	2	+4	50.00
Bosnia and Herzegovina	2	2	0	0	7	3	+4	100.00
Brazil	2	0	1	1	1	2	−1	0.00
Bulgaria	5	2	2	1	6	5	+1	40.00
Denmark	1	1	0	0	2	1	+1	100.00
Ecuador	1	0	0	1	0	1	−1	0.00
England	6	2	0	4	10	18	−8	33.33
Estonia	4	3	1	0	4	0	+4	75.00
France	2	0	1	1	2	4	−2	0.00
Germany	3	1	1	1	4	4	+0	33.33
Greece	1	0	1	0	2	2	+0	0.00
Hong Kong	1	1	0	0	4	0	+4	100.00
Hungary	4	2	2	0	6	1	+5	50.00
Iceland	2	2	0	0	7	1	+6	100.00
Iran	1	0	1	0	2	2	+0	0.00
Israel	4	3	1	0	9	6	+3	75.00
Italy	2	2	0	0	4	1	+3	100.00
Japan	1	0	1	0	0	0	+0	0.00
Kazakhstan	2	2	0	0	5	1	+4	100.00
Latvia	2	2	0	0	5	1	+4	100.00
Liechtenstein	1	1	0	0	5	0	+5	100.00
Macedonia	4	2	1	1	5	5	+0	50.00
Malta	2	1	1	0	4	1	+3	50.00
Mexico	1	0	0	1	0	1	−1	0.00
Moldova	1	1	0	0	1	0	+1	100.00
Netherlands	1	0	0	1	0	3	−3	0.00
Norway	1	1	0	0	2	1	+1	100.00
Poland	3	1	1	1	1	1	+0	33.33
Portugal	1	0	0	1	0	2	−2	0.00
Qatar	1	1	0	0	3	2	+1	100.00
Republic of Ireland	2	0	1	1	2	3	−1	0.00
Romania	2	2	0	0	3	1	+2	100.00
Russia	2	0	2	0	0	0	+0	0.00
San Marino	2	2	0	0	8	0	+8	100.00
Scotland	3	0	3	0	2	2	+0	0.00
Slovakia	3	2	1	0	5	1	+4	66.67
Slovenia	4	2	2	0	5	3	+2	50.00
South Korea	3	0	1	2	1	5	−4	0.00
Spain	2	0	1	1	1	2	−1	0.00
Sweden	3	3	0	0	4	1	+3	100.00
Switzerland	1	0	1	0	0	0	+0	0.00
Turkey	2	0	2	0	3	3	+0	0.00
Ukraine	2	0	2	0	2	2	+0	0.00
Wales	1	0	1	0	1	1	+0	0.00
Total: 49 teams played	112	59	34	19	185	102	+83	52.68
