= Svetoslav Todorov =

Bulgarian footballer

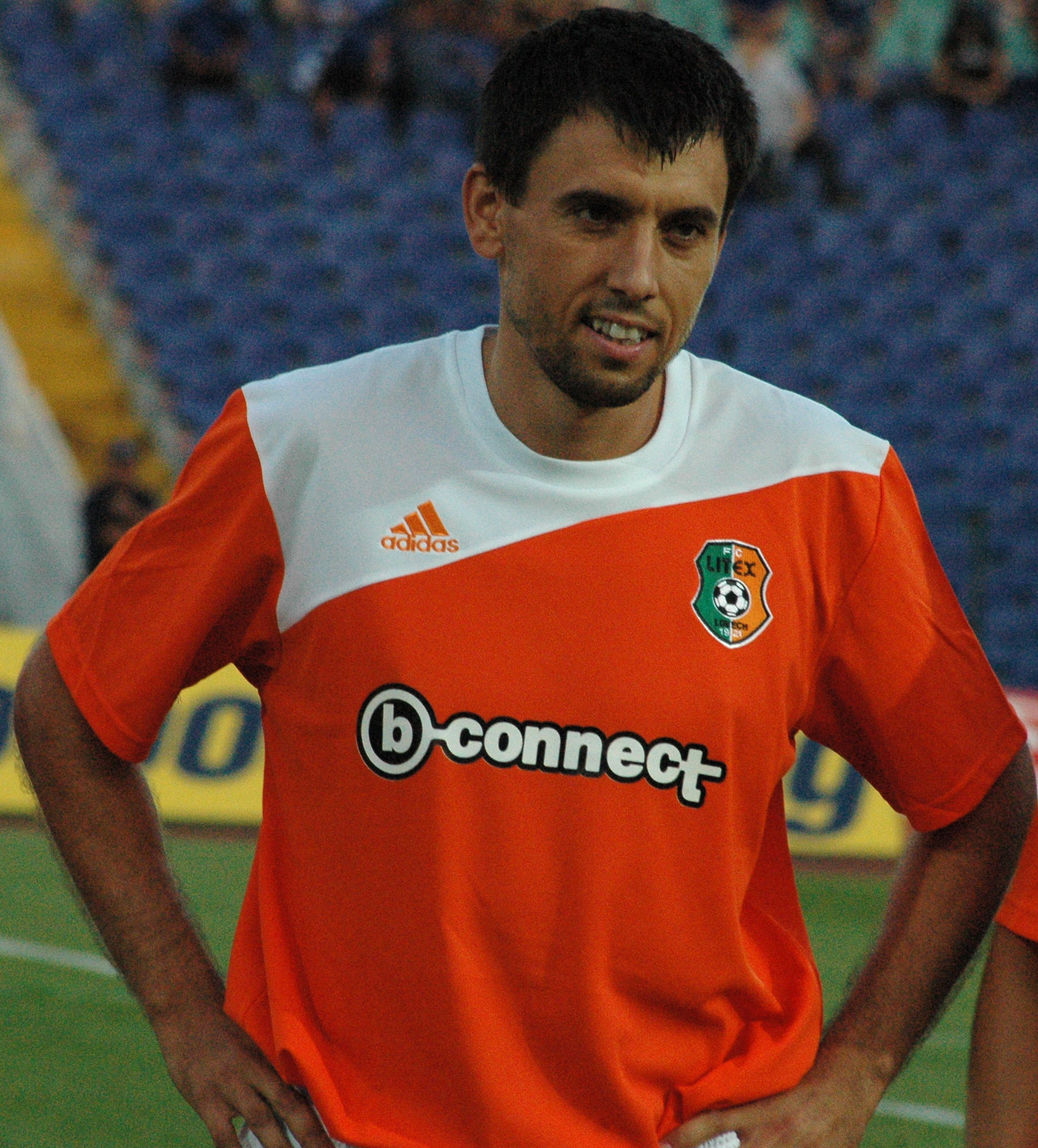
- Todorov being introduced at Litex Lovech in August 2009

Personal information
- Date of birth: 30 August 1978 (age 48)
- Place of birth: Dobrich, Bulgaria
- Height: 6 ft 0 in (1.83 m)
- Position: Second striker

Team information
- Current team: Crystal Palace (academy)

Youth career
- 1990–1993: Dobrudzha Dobrich
- 1993–1996: CSKA Sofia

Senior career*
Years	Team	Apps	(Gls)
1996–1997	Dobrudzha Dobrich	12	(2)
1997–2001	Litex Lovech	70	(34)
2001–2002	West Ham United	14	(1)
2002–2007	Portsmouth	77	(33)
2006–2007	→ Wigan Athletic (loan)	5	(0)
2007–2009	Charlton Athletic	20	(3)
2009–2012	Litex Lovech	56	(20)
2012–2013	Hoverla Uzhhorod	9	(0)
Total		263	(93)

International career
1998–2007	Bulgaria	41	(7)

Managerial career
- 2013–2014: Dobrudzha Dobrich
- 2015–2016: Bulgaria U19
- 2017: CSKA Sofia II
- 2017: Botev Galabovo
- * Club domestic league appearances and goals

Svetoslav Todorov (Bulgarian: Светослав Тодоров; born 30 August 1978) is a Bulgarian former professional footballer who played as a second striker. Todorov is the all-time top scorer for Litex Lovech in the Bulgarian A Football Group. He made 41 appearances for the Bulgaria national team, scoring seven goals. He is currently an academy coach at Crystal Palace.

== Club career ==
=== Early career ===
After being part of the youth system since the age of 6, Todorov began his career at Bulgarian First Division club Dobrudzha Dobrich in 1996–97, scoring twice in twelve appearances. He then joined Second Division champions Litex Lovech where he scored 34 goals in 70 league games over four seasons (two of them title winning). He managed a career-high 19 league goals during the 1999–2000 season, being overtaken as the top goalscorer by Mihail Mihaylov on the last match day. Todorov captained the team over the course of the autumn part of the 2000–2001 campaign. He scored his first European goals during the summer of 1999, in the qualifying rounds of the UEFA Champions League, all three of them coming against Polish team Widzew Łódź. During his time in Bulgaria he had a clean disciplinary record and was sent off only once (on 13 May 2000, in a 1–0 away loss against Spartak Varna in an A PFG match). His form attracted attention from English clubs and after trials with Preston North End and West Ham United, he joined West Ham in January 2001.

=== West Ham United ===
Todorov joined West Ham in January 2001 for a fee of £500,000, rising to £2 million depending on appearances. He made his debut in a 3–0 defeat at Liverpool and scored his first goal for the club in his third game, a 3–2 FA Cup defeat at home to Tottenham, and then scored his first league goal for the club against Middlesbrough. However, following manager Harry Redknapp's departure from the club in May 2001, Todorov found himself out of favour and he played just eight games under new manager Glenn Roeder in the 2001–02 season.

=== Portsmouth ===
Todorov signed for Portsmouth in March 2002 for £750,000, joining director of football, Harry Redknapp, who had signed him for West Ham; Redknapp described him as, "...a very intelligent footballer [who] will bring good competition in the striking department." He was sent off for violent conduct in his second appearance for Portsmouth in a 2–0 defeat away at Preston and made only one further appearance in the 2001–02 season. He became a regular in the first team in the 2002–03 season, making 45 league appearances and scoring 26 goals, including a hat-trick in the final game of the season against Bradford City, as Portsmouth won the Football League First Division championship and were promoted to the Premier League. He was the First Division's top scorer, overhauling Nottingham Forest's David Johnson with his hat-trick on the final day of the season; Redknapp said, "Todorov has had a great season. He is leading scorer in the First Division after today's goals. I bought him from my old club West Ham and he got a lot of stick at first... He has done marvellously, proving what a great player he is." Todorov signed a new three-year contract with Portsmouth in July 2003.

Days before the start of the club's debut Premiership season, Todorov severely damaged a cruciate knee ligament in a training accident. He required surgery on his knee and was expected to miss the rest of the 2003–04 season. He made a comeback in the Portsmouth reserve side in February 2004 and returned to the first team in an away game at Liverpool. He made only the one appearance for Portsmouth in the Premiership during the 2003–04 season and required further surgery on his knee in May 2004, causing him to miss the Euro 2004 championships in the summer of 2004 and the entire 2004–05 season. He was given a new contract in August 2005 and, having played very little in the previous two seasons, was offered to other clubs on loan to regain fitness. However, he remained with Portsmouth and was used mostly as a substitute during the 2005–06 season. He scored the winning goal against West Bromwich Albion in manager Harry Redknapp's second game on returning to Portsmouth in December 2005 and scored crucial goals against West Ham, Blackburn Rovers and Sunderland as Portsmouth battled against and survived relegation.

After scoring twice for Portsmouth in the opening three games of the 2006–07 season, Todorov joined Wigan Athletic in August 2006 on a season-long loan. Wigan manager, Paul Jewell, described him as "..a pure striker who lives to put the ball in the net." However, he made only five appearances for Wigan, without scoring, and returned to Portsmouth in January 2007. He made one further appearance in the 2006–07 season, as a substitute against Fulham in March 2007.

=== Charlton Athletic ===
Having fallen down the pecking order at Portsmouth in the 2006–07 season, Todorov joined relegated side Charlton Athletic in July 2007 on a free transfer in a one-year deal. His first league goal for Charlton came against London rivals Crystal Palace in September 2007, but after suffering a knee injury in a match against Plymouth in October 2007, Todorov was ruled out of the remainder of the 2007–08 season. He signed a new one-year contract in June 2008, but was not offered a new contract at the end of the 2008–09 season.

=== Litex Lovech ===
Todorov joined his former club Litex Lovech as a free agent on 16 July 2009. On 8 August 2009, he marked his return to the TBI A Football Group with a goal after coming on as a substitute for Ivelin Popov – wrapping up a 5–0 away win against Lokomotiv Mezdra with an 89th-minute strike. On 25 October 2010, Todorov scored a last-minute goal against Levski Sofia to help his team to a 2–1 home win. In January 2011, he was chosen by the Litex fans as the 2010 Best Club Player for the Year. On 12 July 2011, he netted twice to help his team to a 2–1 away win against Montenegrin side Mogren in the first leg match of the 2011–12 UEFA Champions League qualifying phase. Todorov left the club after the end of the 2011–12 season.

=== Hoverla Uzhhorod ===
In late August 2012, Todorov signed a one-year contract with newly promoted Ukrainian Premier League club Hoverla Uzhhorod. He made his debut for FC Hoverla Uzhhorod on 31 August 2012, in the 2–1 home win over Tavriya Simferopol and played the last match of his professional career on 24 November, in the 5–1 away loss against Shakhtar Donetsk. He left the club in January 2013 and later announced his retirement.

== International career ==
He used to be part of the Bulgaria U21 team. Todorov made his debut for Bulgaria on 10 March 1998, in the 0:2 loss against Argentina in a friendly match. He was in manager Hristo Bonev's plans for the 1998 World Cup, but missed out due to an injury. For the same reason, he was unable to participate in Euro 2004.

== Personal life ==
Todorov is married to Severina and they have a son. His father, Ivan Manolov, is also a football manager and represented Dobrudzha Dobrich in his playing days. Todorov's younger brother, Pavlin, is a former professional footballer and current manager as well.

== Career statistics ==
=== Club ===
Appearances and goals by club, season and competition
Club	Season	League			National cup (Note: Includes Bulgarian Cup, FA Cup, Ukrainian Cup.)		League cup (Note: Includes League Cup.)		Continental		Other		Total	
Club	Season	Division	Apps	Goals	Apps	Goals	Apps	Goals	Apps	Goals	Apps	Goals	Apps	Goals
Dobrudzha Dobrich	1996–97	A PFG	12	2	0	0	–		–		–		12	2
Litex Lovech	1997–98	A PFG	19	9			–		–		–		19	9
Litex Lovech	1998–99	A PFG	12	2	3	0	–		0	0	–		15	2
Litex Lovech	1999–2000	A PFG	26	19	3	3	–		4	3	–		33	25
Litex Lovech	2000–01	A PFG	13	4	3	9	–		–		–		16	13
Litex Lovech	Total		70	34					4	3	0	0		
West Ham United	2000–01	Premier League	8	1	1	1	0	0	–		–		9	2
West Ham United	2001–02	Premier League	6	0	1	0	1	0	–		–		8	0
West Ham United	England		14	1	2	1	1	0	0	0	0	0	17	2
Portsmouth	2001–02	First Division	3	1	0	0	0	0	–		–		3	1
Portsmouth	2002–03	First Division	45	26	1	0	2	0	–		–		48	26
Portsmouth	2003–04	Premier League	1	0	0	0	0	0	–		–		1	0
Portsmouth	2004–05	Premier League	0	0	0	0	0	0	–		–		0	0
Portsmouth	2005–06	Premier League	24	4	2	0	1	0	–		–		27	4
Portsmouth	2006–07	Premier League	4	2	0	0	0	0	–		–		4	2
Portsmouth	Total		77	33	3	0	3	0	0	0	0	0	83	33
Wigan Athletic (loan)	2006–07	Premier League	5	0	0	0	0	0	–		–		5	0
Charlton Athletic	2007–08	Championship	7	2	0	0	2	1	–		–		9	3
Charlton Athletic	2008–09	Championship	13	1	0	0	0	0	–		–		13	1
Charlton Athletic	Total		20	3	0	0	2	1	0	0	0	0	22	4
Litex Lovech	2009–10	A PFG	11	2	0	0	–		2	0	1	0	14	2
Litex Lovech	2010–11	A PFG	25	8	4	2	–		1	0	1	0	31	10
Litex Lovech	2011–12	A PFG	20	10	4	2	–		6	3	0	0	30	15
Litex Lovech	Total		56	20	8	4	0	0	9	3	2	0	75	27
Hoverla Uzhhorod	2012–13	Ukrainian Premier League	9	0	1	0	–		–		–		10	0
Career total			263	93	23	17	6	1	13	6	2	0	307	117

=== International ===
Scores and results list Bulgaria's goal tally first, score column indicates score after each Todorov goal.

List of international goals scored by Svetoslav Todorov
No.	Date	Venue	Opponent	Score	Result	Competition
1	29 March 2000	Vasil Levski National Stadium, Sofia, Bulgaria	Belarus	1–0	4–1	Friendly
2	7 October 2000	Georgi Asparuhov Stadium, Sofia, Bulgaria	Malta	3–0	3–0	2002 World Cup qualifier
3	27 March 2003	Stadion Mladost, Kruševac, Serbia and Montenegro	Serbia and Montenegro	2–1	2–1	Friendly
4	7 June 2003	Vasil Levski National Stadium, Sofia, Bulgaria	Belgium	2–2	2–2	Euro 2004 qualifier
5	12 November 2005	Vasil Levski National Stadium, Sofia, Bulgaria	Georgia	5–0	6–2	Friendly
6	12 November 2005	Vasil Levski National Stadium, Sofia, Bulgaria	Georgia	6–2	6–2	Friendly
7	9 May 2006	Nagai Stadium, Osaka, Japan	Japan	1–0	2–1	2006 Kirin Cup

== Honours ==
- Champion of Bulgaria 1998, 1999, 2010, 2011
  - Bulgarian Supercup 2010

Portsmouth

- Football League First Division: 2002–03
