= Genís García =

Andorran footballer

Genís García Iscla
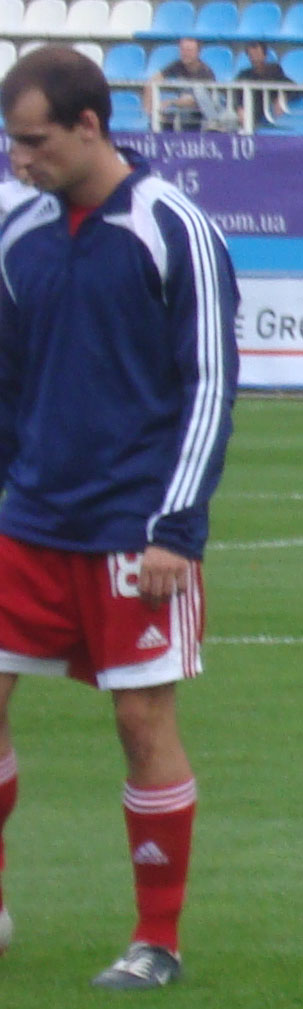

Personal information
- Date of birth: 18 May 1978 (age 48)
- Place of birth: Andorra
- Position: Midfielder

Senior career*
| Years | Team | Apps | (Gls) |
| 1997–2010 | FC Andorra | | |

International career
| 1997–2010 | Andorra | 37 | (0) |
- * Club domestic league appearances and goals

Genís García Iscla (born 18 May 1978) is an Andorran footballer. He currently plays for the Andorra national team and FC Santa Coloma.

== National team statistics ==
Updated 28 September 2014

Andorra national team
| Year | Apps | Goals |
|---|---|---|
| 1997 | 1 | 0 |
| 1998 | 4 | 0 |
| 1999 | 4 | 0 |
| 2000 | 0 | 0 |
| 2001 | 2 | 0 |
| 2002 | 0 | 0 |
| 2003 | 2 | 0 |
| 2004 | 5 | 0 |
| 2005 | 5 | 0 |
| 2006 | 5 | 0 |
| 2007 | 5 | 0 |
| 2008 | 1 | 0 |
| 2009 | 2 | 0 |
| 2010 | 1 | 0 |
| Total | 37 | 0 |
