= Marian Hristov =

Bulgarian footballer (born 1973)

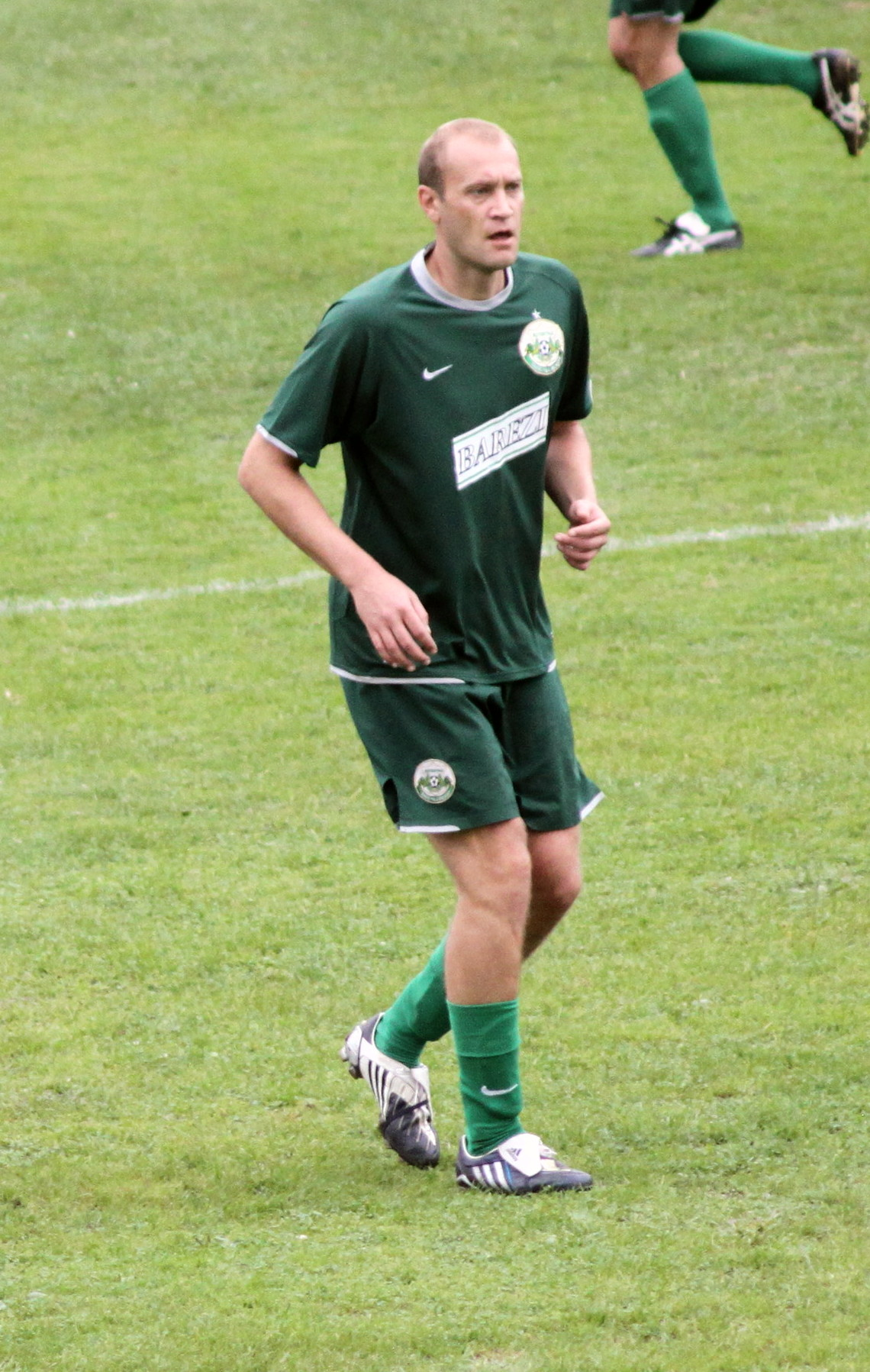
- Hristov with Balkan Botevgrad in 2010

Personal information
- Full name: Marian Georgiev Hristov
- Date of birth: 29 July 1973 (age 53)
- Place of birth: Botevgrad, Bulgaria
- Height: 1.93 m (6 ft 4 in)
- Position: Midfielder

Youth career
- Levski Sofia

Senior career*
Years	Team	Apps	(Gls)
1993–1994	Balkan Botevgrad	19	(6)
1994–1995	Slavia Sofia	26	(8)
1995–1997	Levski Sofia	56	(19)
1997–2004	1. FC Kaiserslautern	146	(26)
2004–2006	VfL Wolfsburg	17	(3)
2008–2011	Balkan Botevgrad	22	(4)
Total		286	(66)

International career
1996–2007	Bulgaria	45	(4)

Managerial career
- 2010–2011: Balkan Botevgrad
- 2013–????: Levski Sofia (assistant manager)
- 2018–2019: Septemvri Sofia (assistant manager)
- * Club domestic league appearances and goals

Marian Georgiev Hristov (Bulgarian: Мариян Георгиев Христов) (born 29 July 1973) is a Bulgarian former professional footballer who played as a midfielder. Since his retirement from playing, he has worked as an assistant manager.

== Club career ==
Hristov began his professional career in 1993 with Balkan Botevgrad. He then spent the 1994–95 season with Slavia Sofia before moving to Levski Sofia in 1995. After spending the 1995–96 and 1996–97 seasons with Levski Sofia, he moved to Germany in 1997 to join Kaiserslautern, marking his move abroad.

At Kaiserslautern, Hristov made 22 appearances and scored 5 goals in the Bundesliga during the 1997–98 season, contributing to the club's title victory. Kaiserslautern won the Bundesliga immediately after being promoted from the 2. Bundesliga. In the 1998–99 UEFA Champions League, he made six appearances out of eight matches, while Kaiserslautern reached the quarter-finals. They were eliminated in the quarter-finals after losing 6–0 on aggregate to Bayern Munich.

In the 2000–01 season, he played in the UEFA Cup. Kaiserslautern reached the semi-finals, where they faced Alavés, and Hristov made 12 appearances and scored 2 goals in the competition. In the 2002–03 season, he reached the DFB-Pokal final, but Kaiserslautern lost 3–1 to Bayern Munich in the final and finished as runners-up. Hristov remained with Kaiserslautern through the 2003–04 season before moving to Wolfsburg in 2004.

At Wolfsburg, he struggled with injuries. On 4 December 2004, following a match against Bayer Leverkusen, he was sidelined for an extended period due to a knee injury and underwent several surgeries. On 18 March 2006, he returned against Hamburger SV after an absence of approximately 15 months. He made 6 Bundesliga appearances in the 2004–05 season and 9 appearances in the 2005–06 season. In the 2006–07 season, he was again sidelined for most of the campaign due to injury and made only 2 appearances. His contract with Wolfsburg was ultimately not renewed in 2007.

== International career ==
Hristov made 45 appearances and scored 4 goals for the Bulgaria national team. He represented the Bulgarian national team as a midfielder from 1996 to 2007 and participated in major international tournaments, including the 1998 FIFA World Cup and UEFA Euro 2004.

At the 1998 FIFA World Cup, he was part of the Bulgarian national team squad at the tournament. He played in two of Bulgaria's three group-stage matches, against Nigeria and the Spain. Bulgaria lost 1–0 to Nigeria in their opening match, with Hristov starting the game. They subsequently drew 0–0 with Paraguay and lost 6–1 to Spain in their final match, resulting in their elimination in the group stage.

Hristov continued to play an important role for the Bulgarian national team and also participated in UEFA Euro 2004. He started all three of Bulgaria's group-stage matches. Bulgaria lost 5–0 to Sweden and 2–0 to Denmark, before losing 2–1 to Italy in their final match and being eliminated in the group stage. Hristov started against Sweden and was also included in the starting lineup against Denmark. In the final match against Italy, he was substituted in the 79th minute for Velizar Dimitrov.

On 7 February 2007, he played in a friendly against Cyprus, making his 45th appearance for the national team. Bulgaria won the match 3–0, and it was Hristov's final international appearance. He subsequently retired from international football, having made a total of 45 appearances and scored 4 goals for the Bulgarian national team.

He subsequently moved into coaching and also expressed an interest in managing the Bulgarian national team.

=== International goals ===
Scores and results list Bulgaria's goal tally first, score column indicates score after each Hristov goal.

List of international goals scored by Marian Hristov
No.	Date	Venue	Opponent	Score	Result	Competition
1	8 November 1996	Rajamangala Stadium, Bangkok	Thailand	1–0	4–0	Friendly
2	8 November 1996	Rajamangala Stadium, Bangkok	Thailand	2–0	4–0	Friendly
3	25 April 2001	Ullevaal Stadion, Oslo	Norway	1–0	1–2	Friendly
4	10 September 2003	Estadi Comunal d'Aixovall, Andorra la Vella	Andorra	3–0	3–0	Euro 2004 qualifier

== Honours ==
1. FC Kaiserslautern

- Bundesliga: 1997–98
- DFB-Pokal runner-up: 2002–03
