= Teet Allas =

Estonian footballer (born 1977)

Personal information
- Date of birth: 2 June 1977 (age 49)
- Place of birth: Pärnu, then part of Estonian SSR, Soviet Union
- Height: 1.82 m (5 ft 11 1/2 in)
- Position: Right back

Senior career*
Years	Team	Apps	(Gls)
1994–1996	Pärnu Kalev	26	(4)
1996	→ Vall Tallinn (loan)	9	(0)
1996	→ Lelle SK (loan)	7	(1)
1997–2000	JK Viljandi Tulevik	68	(15)
2000–2010	FC Flora Tallinn	244	(13)
2010	Dalkurd FF	13	(0)
2011–2013	Paide Linnameeskond	46	(3)
2014	JK Retro Tallinn	5	(0)

International career
1997–2008	Estonia	73	(2)
- * Club domestic league appearances and goals

Teet Allas (born 2 June 1977) is a retired Estonian professional footballer. He played the position of defender.

After his footballer career he became a football referee.

== Club career ==
Allas was born in Pärnu. His former clubs include Pärnu Kalev, Vall Tallinn, Lelle SK, and JK Viljandi Tulevik and FC Flora Tallinn.

In 2010, he played for Dalkurd FF.

In March 2011 he signed a deal with Estonian Meistriliiga club Paide Linnameeskond.

== International career ==
He was a regular with the Estonian national team. He has got 73 caps and 2 goal since 1997. He made his debut on 1 March 1997 against Azerbaijan.

=== International goals ===
Scores and results table. Estonia's goal tally first:

Goal	Date	Venue	Opponent	Score	Result	Competition	Ref.
1.	21 August 2002	A. Le Coq Arena, Tallinn, Estonia	Moldova	1–0	1–0	Friendly	
2.	7 June 2003	A. Le Coq Arena, Tallinn, Estonia	Andorra	1–0	2–0	UEFA Euro 2004 qualifying	

== Honours ==
=== Individual ===
- Estonian Silverball: 2002
