= UEFA Euro 2004 qualifying Group 8 =

Football tournament qualification stage

Standings and results for Group 8 of the UEFA Euro 2004 qualifying tournament.

Group 8 consisted of Andorra, Belgium, Bulgaria, Croatia and Estonia. Group winners were Bulgaria. Croatia and Belgium finished equal on points in for second place, however Croatia qualified for the play-offs due to goal difference in their head-to-head records.

== Standings ==
Pos	Team	Pld	W	D	L	GF	GA	GD	Pts	Qualification	(Bulgaria)	(Croatia)	(Belgium)	(Estonia)	(Andorra)
1	Bulgaria	8	5	2	1	13	4	+9	17	Qualify for final tournament	—	2–0	2–2	2–0	2–1
2	Croatia	8	5	1	2	12	4	+8	16 (Note: Tied on head-to-head points (3). Head-to-head goal difference: Croatia +3, Belgium −3.)	Advance to play-offs	1–0	—	4–0	0–0	2–0
3	Belgium	8	5	1	2	11	9	+2	16		0–2	2–1	—	2–0	3–0
4	Estonia	8	2	2	4	4	6	−2	8		0–0	0–1	0–1	—	2–0
5	Andorra	8	0	0	8	1	18	−17	0		0–3	0–3	0–1	0–2	—

Source: UEFA
Rules for classification: Qualification tiebreakers

== Matches ==
7 September 2002
18:00 UTC+2

Croatia	0–0	Estonia
	Report

Stadion Gradski vrt, Osijek
Attendance: 10,766
Referee: Juan Antonio Fernández Marín (Spain)
7 September 2002
20:00 UTC+2

Belgium	0–2	Bulgaria
	Report	Janković 17'; Petrov 63'

King Baudouin Stadium, Brussels
Attendance: 30,950
Referee: Terje Hauge (Norway)

12 October 2002
18:00 UTC+3

Bulgaria	2–0	Croatia
Petrov 22'; Berbatov 37'	Report

Vasil Levski National Stadium, Sofia
Attendance: 37,500
Referee: Anders Frisk (Sweden)
12 October 2002
20:00 UTC+2

Andorra	0–1	Belgium
	Report	Sonck 61'

Estadi Comunal d'Aixovall, Andorra la Vella
Attendance: 1,100
Referee: Karen Nalbandyan (Armenia)

16 October 2002
18:00 UTC+3

Bulgaria	2–1	Andorra
Chilikov 37'; Balakov 58'	Report	Lima 80'

Vasil Levski National Stadium, Sofia
Attendance: 25,500
Referee: Ceri Richards (Wales)
16 October 2002
21:30 UTC+3

Estonia	0–1	Belgium
	Report	Sonck 2'

Lilleküla Stadium, Tallinn
Attendance: 3,900
Referee: Mike Riley (England)

29 March 2003
18:30 UTC+1

Croatia	4–0	Belgium
Srna 9'; Pršo 55'; Marić 70'; Leko 76'	Report

Stadion Maksimir, Zagreb
Attendance: 18,117
Referee: Herbert Fandel (Germany)

2 April 2003
18:00 UTC+3

Estonia	0–0	Bulgaria
	Report

Lilleküla Stadium, Tallinn
Attendance: 2,500
Referee: Konrad Plautz (Austria)
2 April 2003
18:00 UTC+2

Croatia	2–0	Andorra
Rapaić 10' (pen.), 43'	Report

Stadion Varteks, Varaždin
Attendance: 8,290
Referee: Marian Salomir (Romania)

30 April 2003
17:00 UTC+2

Andorra	0–2	Estonia
	Report	Zelinski 26', 74'

Estadi Comunal d'Aixovall, Andorra la Vella
Attendance: 850
Referee: Ali Aydin (Turkey)

7 June 2003
19:00 UTC+3

Estonia	2–0	Andorra
Allas 22'; Viikmäe 31'	Report

Lilleküla Stadium, Tallinn
Attendance: 2,700
Referee: Attila Juhos (Hungary)
7 June 2003
19:15 UTC+3

Bulgaria	2–2	Belgium
Berbatov 52'; Todorov 71' (pen.)	Report	Petrov 30' (o.g.); Clement 55'

Vasil Levski National Stadium, Sofia
Attendance: 42,099
Referee: Pierluigi Collina (Italy)

11 June 2003
19:00 UTC+3

Estonia	0–1	Croatia
	Report	Kovač 76'

Lilleküla Stadium, Tallinn
Attendance: 6,100
Referee: Alain Hamer (Luxembourg)
11 June 2003
20:15 UTC+2

Belgium	3–0	Andorra
Goor 21', 69'; Sonck 45'	Report

Jules Ottenstadion, Ghent
Attendance: 11,747
Referee: Siarhei Shmolik (BLR)

6 September 2003
16:00 UTC+2

Andorra	0–3	Croatia
	Report	Kovač 4'; Šimunić 16'; Roso 71'

Estadi Comunal d'Aixovall, Andorra la Vella
Attendance: 800
Referee: Miroslav Liba (Czech Republic)
6 September 2003
18:00 UTC+3

Bulgaria	2–0	Estonia
Petrov 16'; Berbatov 66'	Report

Vasil Levski National Stadium, Sofia
Attendance: 25,128
Referee: Franz-Xaver Wack (Germany)

10 September 2003
17:30 UTC+2

Andorra	0–3	Bulgaria
	Report	Berbatov 11', 24'; Hristov 58'

Estadi Comunal d'Aixovall, Andorra la Vella
Attendance: 450
Referee: Tomasz Mikulski (Poland)
10 September 2003
20:15 UTC+2

Belgium	2–1	Croatia
Sonck 35', 43'	Report	Šimić 37'

King Baudouin Stadium, Brussels
Attendance: 35,682
Referee: Graham Poll (England)

11 October 2003
20:15 UTC+2

Croatia	1–0	Bulgaria
Olić 48'	Report

Stadion Maksimir, Zagreb
Attendance: 31,363
Referee: Gilles Veissiere (France)
11 October 2003
20:15 UTC+2

Belgium	2–0	Estonia
Piiroja 41' (o.g.); Buffel 60'	Report

Stade Maurice Dufrasne, Liège
Attendance: 22,408
Referee: Massimo Busacca (Switzerland)

== Goalscorers ==
There were 41 goals scored in 20 matches, for an average of 2.05 goals per match.

5 goals

- (Belgium) Wesley Sonck
- (Bulgaria) Dimitar Berbatov

2 goals

- (Belgium) Bart Goor
- (Bulgaria) Stiliyan Petrov
- (Croatia) Niko Kovač
- (Croatia) Milan Rapaić
- (Estonia) Indrek Zelinski

1 goal

- (Andorra) Antoni Lima
- (Belgium) Thomas Buffel
- (Belgium) Philippe Clement
- (Bulgaria) Krasimir Balakov
- (Bulgaria) Georgi Chilikov
- (Bulgaria) Marian Hristov
- (Bulgaria) Zoran Janković
- (Bulgaria) Martin Petrov
- (Bulgaria) Svetoslav Todorov
- (Croatia) Jerko Leko
- (Croatia) Tomislav Marić
- (Croatia) Ivica Olić
- (Croatia) Dado Pršo
- (Croatia) Đovani Roso
- (Croatia) Dario Šimić
- (Croatia) Josip Šimunić
- (Croatia) Darijo Srna
- (Estonia) Teet Allas
- (Estonia) Kristen Viikmäe

1 own goal

- (Bulgaria) Stiliyan Petrov (against Belgium)
- (Estonia) Raio Piiroja (against Belgium)
