= List of foreign Bundesliga players =

This is a list of foreign players in the Bundesliga, which commenced play in 1963. The following players must meet both of the following two criteria:

1. Have played at least one Bundesliga game. Players who were signed by Bundesliga clubs, but only played in lower league, cup and/or European games, or did not play in any competitive games at all, are not included. Players of 2. Bundesliga clubs are also not included.
2. Are considered foreign, i.e., outside Germany determined by the following:

A player is considered foreign if he is not eligible to play for the national team of Germany.

More specifically,

- If a player has been capped on an international level, the national team is used; if he has been capped by more than one country, the highest level (or the most recent) team is used. These include German players with dual citizenship.
- If a player has not been capped on an international level, his country of birth is used, except those who were born abroad from German parents or moved to Germany at a young age, and those who clearly indicated to have switched his nationality to another nation.

Clubs listed are those for which the player has played at least one Bundesliga game—and seasons are those in which the player has played at least one Bundesliga game. Note that seasons, not calendar years, are used. For example, "1992–95" indicates that the player has played in every season from 1992–93 to 1994–95, but not necessarily every calendar year from 1992 to 1995. Therefore, a player should always have a listing under at least two years — for instance, a player making his debut in 2014, during the 2013–14 season, will have '2013–14' after his name. This follows general practice in expressing sporting seasons.

Also please consider, that season specifications shall only be divided into more than one element, if a player has at least one season played no game in the Bundesliga. For example, a player plays in 2012–13 at club "A" and in 2013–14 at club "B", the correct season specification is "2012–14". This approach is used to keep the list more clear and readable.

In bold: players who have played at least one Bundesliga game in the current season (2026–27), and are still at the clubs for which they have played. This does not include current players of a Bundesliga club who have not played a Bundesliga game in the current season.

As of 1 July 2026

== Naturalized players ==
(Note: Players that have been born abroad, moved to Germany later than the age of twelve, acquired German citizenship and waived the opportunity to play for the national teams of their native countries in order to be eligible to play for Germany)

- (Ghana) Gerald Asamoah – Schalke 04, FC St. Pauli, Greuther Fürth – 2001–11, 2012–13
- (Brazil) Cacau – 1. FC Nürnberg, VfB Stuttgart – 2001–14
- (South Africa) Sean Dundee – Karlsruher SC, VfB Stuttgart – 1995–98, 1999–2003
- (Brazil) (Panama) Kevin Kurányi – VfB Stuttgart, Schalke 04, TSG Hoffenheim – 2001–10, 2015–16
- (Switzerland) Oliver Neuville – Hansa Rostock, Bayer Leverkusen, Borussia M'gladbach – 1997–2007, 2008–10
- (Brazil) Paulo Rink – Bayer Leverkusen, 1. FC Nürnberg, Energie Cottbus – 1997–2003
- (Czechoslovakia) Mirko Votava – Borussia Dortmund, Werder Bremen – 1976–82, 1985–97

== UEFA ==
=== Albania ===
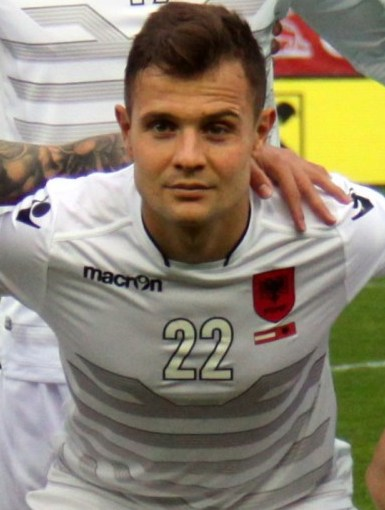
Amir Abrashi

- Amir Abrashi – SC Freiburg – 2016–21
- Geri Çipi – Eintracht Frankfurt – 2003–04
- Mehmet Dragusha – Eintracht Frankfurt – 2003–04
- Klodian Duro – Arminia Bielefeld – 2004–05
- Jürgen Gjasula – 1. FC Kaiserslautern – 2004–05
- Klaus Gjasula – SC Paderborn, Darmstadt 98 – 2019–20, 2023–24
- Besnik Hasi – 1860 Munich – 1997–98
- Jahmir Hyka – Mainz 05 – 2009–10
- Edmond Kapllani – Karlsruher SC, FC Augsburg – 2007–09, 2011–12
- Bekim Kastrati – Borussia M'gladbach – 2005–06
- Altin Lala – Hannover 96 – 2002–12
- Mërgim Mavraj – VfL Bochum, Greuther Fürth, 1. FC Köln, Hamburger SV – 2007–10, 2012–13, 2014–18
- Valdet Rama – Hannover 96 – 2009–10
- Odise Roshi – 1. FC Köln – 2011–12
- Altin Rraklli – SC Freiburg, SpVgg Unterhaching – 1993–96, 1999–2001
- Ervin Skela – Eintracht Frankfurt, Arminia Bielefeld, 1. FC Kaiserslautern, Energie Cottbus – 2003–09
- Igli Tare – Karlsruher SC, 1. FC Kaiserslautern – 1996–97, 1999–2001
- Fatmir Vata – Arminia Bielefeld – 2002–03, 2004–07
- Rudi Vata – Energie Cottbus – 2000–02
- Hysen Zmijani – FC St. Pauli – 1995–96

=== Armenia ===
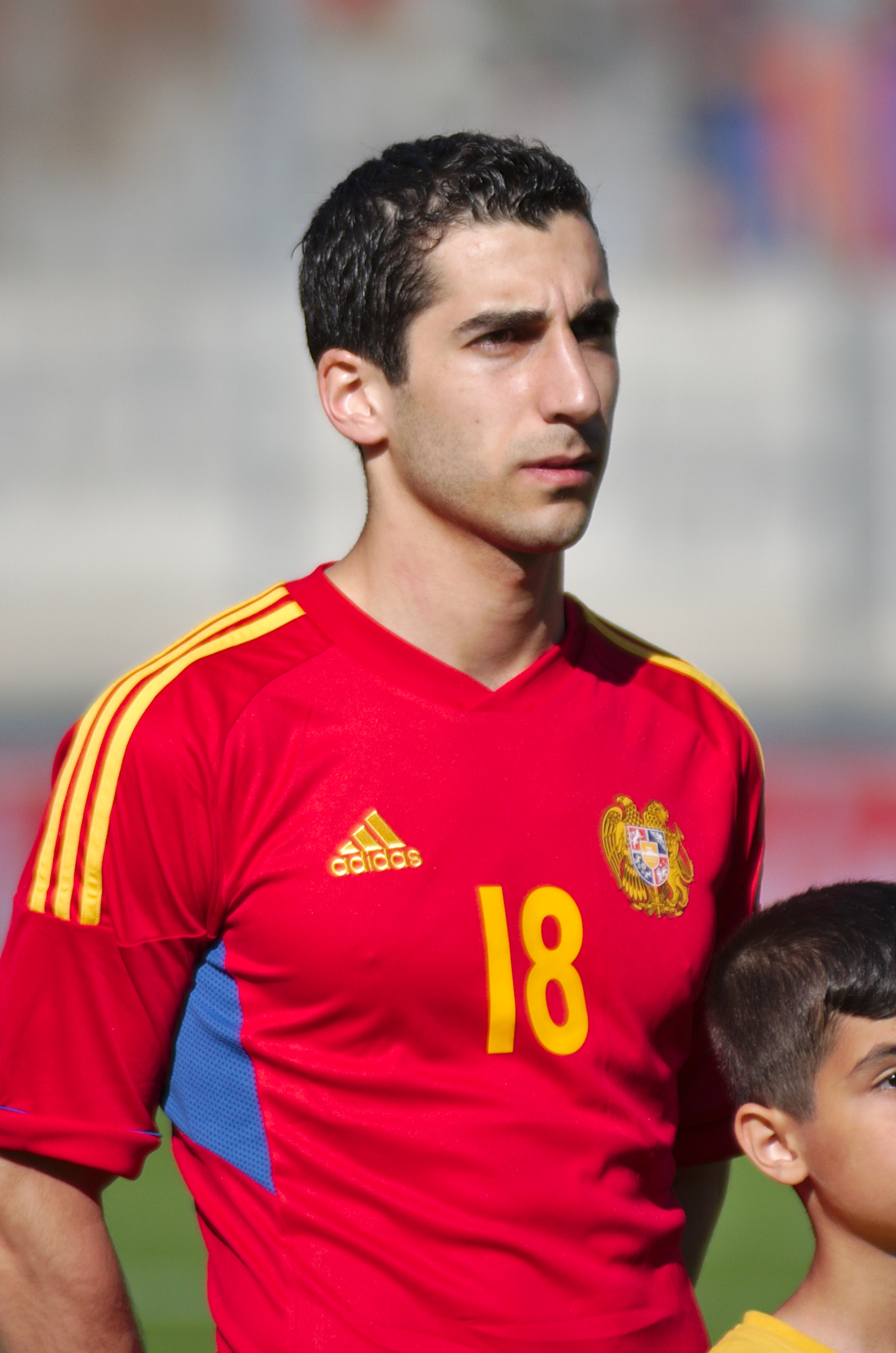
Henrikh Mkhitaryan

- **Sargis Adamyan** – TSG Hoffenheim, **1. FC Köln** – 2019–
- Henrikh Mkhitaryan – Borussia Dortmund – 2013–16
- Grant-Leon Ranos – Borussia M'gladbach – 2023–26

=== Austria ===
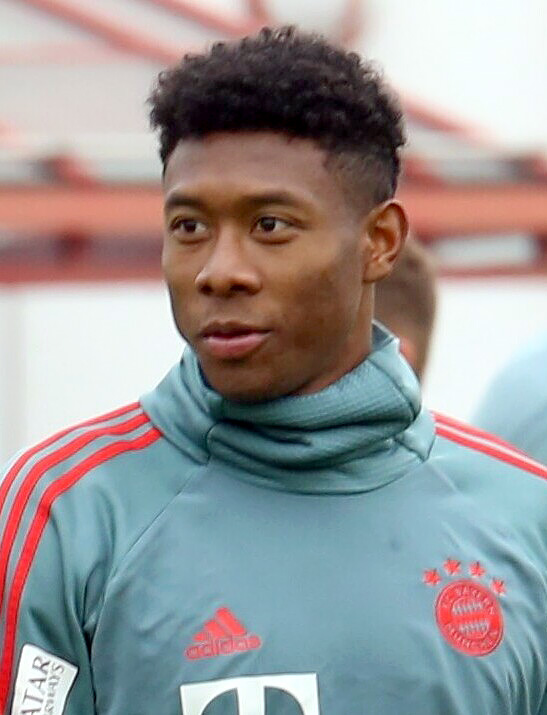
David Alaba in 2019

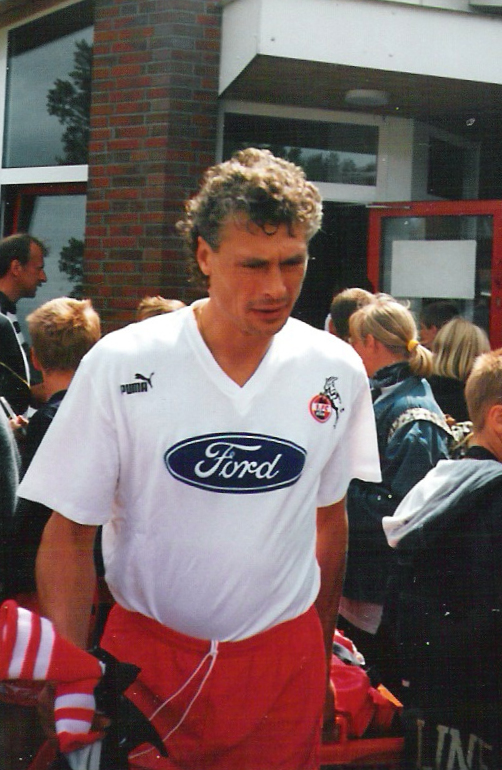
Toni Polster

- **Junior Adamu** – **SC Freiburg** – 2023–
- David Alaba – Bayern Munich, TSG Hoffenheim – 2009–21
- Robert Almer – Fortuna Düsseldorf – 2012–13
- Marko Arnautović – Werder Bremen – 2010–14
- **Julian Baumgartlinger** – Mainz 05, Bayer Leverkusen, **FC Augsburg** – 2011–
- **Christoph Baumgartner** – TSG Hoffenheim, **RB Leipzig** – 2018–
- Michael Baur – Hamburger SV – 2002–03
- Guido Burgstaller – Schalke 04 – 2016–20
- Harald Cerny – Bayern Munich, 1860 Munich – 1992–94, 1995–2004
- **Carney Chukwuemeka** – **Borussia Dortmund** – 2024–
- Kevin Danso – FC Augsburg – 2016–19
- Marco Djuricin – Hertha BSC – 2011–12
- Nikola Dovedan – 1. FC Heidenheim – 2023–24
- Aleksandar Dragović – Bayer Leverkusen – 2016–21
- Hans Ettmayer – VfB Stuttgart, Hamburger SV – 1971–77
- Wolfgang Feiersinger – Borussia Dortmund – 1996–2000
- **Marco Friedl** – Bayern Munich, **Werder Bremen** – 2017–21, 2022–
- Gernot Fraydl – Hertha BSC – 1968–70
- Christian Fuchs – VfL Bochum, Mainz 05, Schalke 04 – 2008–15
- György Garics – Darmstadt 98 – 2015–16
- Christian Gebauer – Arminia Bielefeld – 2020–22
- Eduard Glieder – Schalke 04 – 2003–04
- **Michael Gregoritsch** – Hamburger SV, **FC Augsburg**, Schalke 04, SC Freiburg – 2015–
- Leo Greiml – Schalke 04 – 2022–23
- Florian Grillitsch – Werder Bremen, TSG Hoffenheim – 2015–22, 2023–25
- **Marco Grüll** – **Werder Bremen** – 2024–
- Max Hagmayr – Karlsruher SC – 1982–83
- Martin Harnik – Werder Bremen, VfB Stuttgart, Hannover 96 – 2007–09, 2010–16, 2017–20
- Franz Hasil – Schalke 04 – 1968–69
- Roland Hattenberger – VfB Stuttgart – 1977–81
- Andreas Herzog – Werder Bremen, Bayern Munich – 1992–2002
- Josef Hickersberger – Kickers Offenbach, Fortuna Düsseldorf – 1972–78
- Martin Hinteregger – Borussia M'gladbach, FC Augsburg, Eintracht Frankfurt – 2015–22
- Reinhold Hintermaier – 1. FC Nürnberg, Eintracht Braunschweig – 1980–85, 1992–93
- Lukas Hinterseer – FC Ingolstadt – 2015–17
- Norbert Hof – Hamburger SV – 1969–70
- Erwin Hoffer – 1. FC Kaiserslautern, Eintracht Frankfurt – 2010–11, 2012–13
- Raphael Holzhauser – VfB Stuttgart, FC Augsburg – 2011–14
- Mathias Honsak – Darmstadt 98, 1. FC Heidenheim – 2023–26
- Philipp Hosiner – 1. FC Köln – 2015–16
- Wilhelm Huberts – Eintracht Frankfurt – 1963–70
- Andreas Ibertsberger – SC Freiburg, TSG Hoffenheim – 2004–05, 2008–12
- Muhammed Ildiz – 1. FC Nürnberg – 2012–13
- Stefan Ilsanker – RB Leipzig, Eintracht Frankfurt – 2016–22
- Andreas Ivanschitz – Mainz 05 – 2009–13
- Lukas Jäger – 1. FC Nürnberg – 2018–19
- Kurt Jara – MSV Duisburg, Schalke 04 – 1975–81
- Zlatko Junuzović – Werder Bremen – 2011–18
- Florian Kainz – Werder Bremen, 1. FC Köln – 2016–24
- Saša Kalajdžić – VfB Stuttgart, Eintracht Frankfurt – 2020–24
- Emir Karić – Darmstadt – 2023–24
- Richard Kitzbichler – Hamburger SV – 2002–03
- Christoph Klarer – Darmstadt 98 – 2023–24
- Florian Klein – VfB Stuttgart – 2014–16
- Janos Kondert – Kickers Offenbach – 1968–69
- Ümit Korkmaz – Eintracht Frankfurt – 2008–11
- Bernd Krauss – Borussia Dortmund, Borussia M'gladbach – 1976–77, 1983–90 (Note: Held Austrian citizenship only between 1981 and 1984, so he was a foreign Bundesliga player only in the 1983–84 season.)
- **Nicolas Kristof** – **SV Elversberg** – 2026–
- Dietmar Kühbauer – VfL Wolfsburg – 2000–02
- **Konrad Laimer** – RB Leipzig, **Bayern Munich** – 2017–
- **Stefan Lainer** – **Borussia M'gladbach** – 2019–
- Michael Langer – VfB Stuttgart, Schalke 04 – 2006–07, 2020–21
- Valentino Lazaro – Hertha BSC, Borussia M'gladbach – 2017–19, 2020–21
- Stefan Lexa – Eintracht Frankfurt – 2003–04, 2005–06
- **Philipp Lienhart** – **SC Freiburg** – 2017–
- Heinz Lindner – Eintracht Frankfurt – 2016–17
- Dejan Ljubičić – 1. FC Köln – 2021–24
- Jürgen Macho – 1. FC Kaiserslautern – 2005–06
- Stefan Maierhofer – Bayern Munich – 2006–07
- Alex Manninger – FC Augsburg – 2012–16
- Stephan Marasek – SC Freiburg – 1996–97
- Georg Margreitter – 1. FC Nürnberg – 2018–19
- **Florian Micheler** – **TSG Hoffenheim** – 2024–
- Hans-Dieter Mirnegg – MSV Duisburg – 1979–81
- Marlon Mustapha – Mainz 05 – 2022–23
- **Phillipp Mwene** – **Mainz 05** – 2018–21, 2023–
- David Nemeth – Mainz 05, FC St. Pauli – 2021–22, 2024–25
- Franz Oberacher – 1. FC Nürnberg – 1980–81
- Rubin Okotie – 1. FC Nürnberg – 2010–11
- Karim Onisiwo – Mainz 05 – 2015–25
- Ramazan Özcan – TSG Hoffenheim, FC Ingolstadt, Bayer Leverkusen – 2008–09, 2015–16, 2017–19
- Peter Pacult – 1860 Munich – 1994–95
- Thomas Parits – 1. FC Köln, Eintracht Frankfurt – 1970–74
- Pavao Pervan – VfL Wolfsburg – 2018–22, 2023–24
- Bruno Pezzey – Eintracht Frankfurt, Werder Bremen – 1978–87
- Heimo Pfeifenberger – Werder Bremen – 1996–98
- Benedikt Pichler – Holstein Kiel – 2024–25
- Hans Pirkner – Schalke 04 – 1969–71
- Gernot Plassnegger – VfL Wolfsburg, Hansa Rostock – 2001–02, 2003–04
- Emanuel Pogatetz – Hannover 96, VfL Wolfsburg, 1. FC Nürnberg – 2010–14
- Toni Polster – 1. FC Köln, Borussia M'gladbach – 1993–99
- Mario Posch – Bayer Uerdingen – 1992–93
- **Stefan Posch** – TSG Hoffenheim, **Mainz 05** – 2017–23, 2025–
- **Alexander Prass** – **TSG Hoffenheim** – 2024–
- Manuel Prietl – Arminia Bielefeld – 2020–22
- Sebastian Prödl – Werder Bremen – 2008–15
- Christian Prosenik – 1860 Munich – 1999–2000
- Peter Pumm – Bayern Munich – 1968–71
- Marcus Pürk – 1860 Munich – 1999–2004
- **Leopold Querfeld** – **Union Berlin** – 2024–
- Hannes Reinmayr – MSV Duisburg, Bayer Uerdingen – 1993–95
- Alfred Roscher – Waldhof Mannheim – 1987–88
- Daniel Royer – Hannover 96 – 2011–12
- **Marcel Sabitzer** – RB Leipzig, Bayern Munich, **Borussia Dortmund** – 2016–
- Samuel Şahin-Radlinger – Hannover 96 – 2018–19
- Ylli Sallahi – Bayern Munich – 2013–14
- Paul Scharner – Hamburger SV – 2012–13
- Louis Schaub – 1. FC Köln – 2019–20, 2021–22
- Xaver Schlager – VfL Wolfsburg, RB Leipzig – 2019–26
- Romano Schmid – Werder Bremen – 2020–21, 2022–26
- Hans Schmidradner – Kickers Offenbach – 1972–76
- Peter Schmidt – 1. FC Kaiserslautern – 1968–69
- Alessandro Schöpf – Schalke 04, Arminia Bielefeld – 2015–22
- Markus Schopp – Hamburger SV – 1996–98
- Helmut Siber – Kickers Offenbach – 1968–69
- **Yanik Spalt** – **VfB Stuttgart** – 2026–
- August Starek – 1. FC Nürnberg, Bayern Munich – 1967–70
- Gerhard Steinkogler – Werder Bremen – 1979–80
- Josef Stering – 1860 Munich – 1979–80
- **Kevin Stöger** – Fortuna Düsseldorf, Mainz 05, VfL Bochum, **Borussia M'gladbach** – 2018–
- Martin Stranzl – 1860 Munich, VfB Stuttgart, Borussia M'gladbach – 1998–2006, 2010–16
- Richard Strebinger – Werder Bremen – 2014–15
- Markus Suttner – FC Ingolstadt, Fortuna Düsseldorf – 2015–17, 2018–20
- Georg Teigl – FC Augsburg – 2016–17, 2018–20
- **Christopher Trimmel** – **Union Berlin** – 2019–
- Hans-Georg Tutschek – Eintracht Frankfurt – 1964–65
- Ivica Vastić – MSV Duisburg – 1993–94 (Note: Held Austrian citizenship only from 1996 onwards, so he was a foreign Bundesliga player for Croatia in 1993–94.)
- **Nikolas Veratschnig** – **Mainz 05** – 2024–
- Michael Wagner – SC Freiburg – 1996–97
- Clemens Walch – VfB Stuttgart, 1. FC Kaiserslautern – 2009–12
- Roman Wallner – Hannover 96 – 2004–05
- Paul Wanner – Bayern Munich, 1. FC Heidenheim – 2021–23, 2024–25
- Markus Weissenberger – Arminia Bielefeld, 1860 Munich, Eintracht Frankfurt – 1999–2000, 2001–04, 2005–08
- Thomas Weissenberger – 1. FC Nürnberg – 1992–93
- Christoph Westerthaler – Eintracht Frankfurt – 1998–2000
- Gerd Wimmer – Eintracht Frankfurt, Hansa Rostock – 2000–01, 2002–04
- Kevin Wimmer – 1. FC Köln, Hannover 96 – 2014–15, 2018–19
- Patrick Wimmer – Arminia Bielefeld, VfL Wolfsburg – 2021–26
- **Maximilian Wöber** – Borussia M'gladbach, Werder Bremen, **Schalke 04** – 2023–24, 2025–
- Franz Wohlfahrt – VfB Stuttgart – 1996–2000
- Hannes Wolf – RB Leipzig, Borussia M'gladbach – 2019–23
- Philipp Zulechner – SC Freiburg – 2013–15
- Robert Žulj – TSG Hoffenheim – 2017–18

=== Azerbaijan ===
- Deniz Yılmaz – Mainz 05 – 2011–12

=== Belarus ===
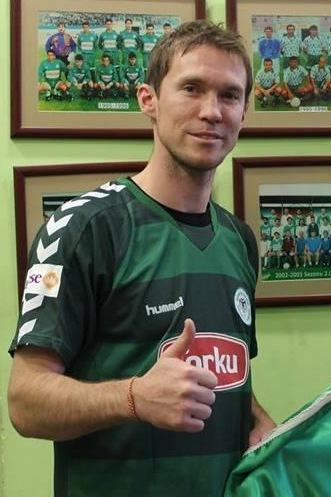
Alexander Hleb

- Alexander Hleb – VfB Stuttgart, VfL Wolfsburg – 2000–05, 2009–10, 2011–12
- Vyacheslav Hleb – Hamburger SV – 2003–05
- Anton Putsila – Hamburger SV, SC Freiburg – 2007–08, 2010–13

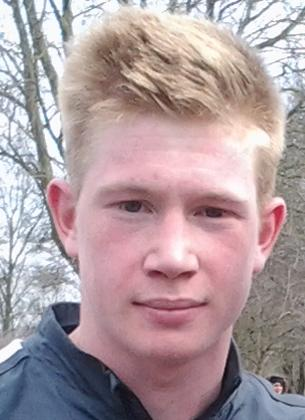
Kevin De Bruyne was awarded Footballer of the Year in Germany in 2015.

=== Belgium ===
(Note: Alphabetical ordering follows Belgian customs)

- **Ameen Al-Dakhil** – **VfB Stuttgart** – 2024–
- Ismail Azzaoui – VfL Wolfsburg – 2015–16
- Logan Bailly – Borussia M'gladbach – 2008–12
- **Johan Bakayoko** – **RB Leipzig** – 2025–
- Michy Batshuayi – Borussia Dortmund, Eintracht Frankfurt – 2017–18, 2024–26
- Sebastiaan Bornauw – 1. FC Köln, VfL Wolfsburg – 2019–26
- Dedryck Boyata – Hertha BSC – 2019–22
- Massimo Bruno – RB Leipzig – 2016–17
- Koen Casteels – TSG Hoffenheim, Werder Bremen, VfL Wolfsburg – 2012–24
- **Alessio Castro-Montes** – **1. FC Köln** – 2025–
- Nico Claesen – VfB Stuttgart – 1984–86
- Roger Claessen – Alemannia Aachen – 1968–70
- Filip Daems – Borussia M'gladbach – 2004–06, 2008–14
- Kevin De Bruyne – Werder Bremen, VfL Wolfsburg – 2012–16
- Igor de Camargo – Borussia M'gladbach, TSG Hoffenheim – 2010–13
- **Nathan De Cat** – **TSG Hoffenheim** – 2026–
- Nathan de Medina – Arminia Bielefeld – 2020–22
- Jonas De Roeck – FC Augsburg – 2011–12
- **Olivier Deman** – **Werder Bremen** – 2023–
- Didier Dheedene – 1860 Munich – 2001–02
- Landry Dimata – VfL Wolfsburg – 2017–18
- Julien Duranville – Borussia Dortmund – 2022–25
- Arne Engels – FC Augsburg – 2022–25
- Bart Goor – Hertha BSC – 2001–04
- Michaël Goossens – Schalke 04 – 1997–2000
- Thorgan Hazard – Borussia M'gladbach, Borussia Dortmund – 2014–24
- Adnan Januzaj – Borussia Dortmund – 2015–16
- Vincent Kompany – Hamburger SV – 2006–09
- Michael Lejan – 1. FC Köln – 2003–04
- Christophe Lepoint – 1860 Munich – 2003–04
- Dodi Lukébakio – Fortuna Düsseldorf, Hertha BSC – 2018–23
- **Senne Lynen** – **Werder Bremen** – 2023–
- Junior Malanda – VfL Wolfsburg – 2013–15
- Orel Mangala – VfB Stuttgart – 2017–18, 2020–22
- **Noah Mbamba** – **Bayer Leverkusen** – 2022–
- **Samuel Mbangula** – **Werder Bremen** – 2025–
- Thomas Meunier – Borussia Dortmund – 2020–24
- Émile Mpenza – Schalke 04, Hamburger SV – 1999–2003, 2004–06
- Vadis Odjidja-Ofoe – Hamburger SV – 2007–08
- Loïs Openda – RB Leipzig – 2023–26
- Divock Origi – VfL Wolfsburg – 2017–18
- Jacky Peeters – Arminia Bielefeld – 1999–2000
- Jean-Marie Pfaff – Bayern Munich – 1982–88
- Gerard Plessers – Hamburger SV – 1984–88
- Sébastien Pocognoli – Hannover 96 – 2012–14
- Benito Raman – Fortuna Düsseldorf, Schalke 04 – 2018–21
- Bernd Rauw – Arminia Bielefeld – 2002–03, 2004–05
- **Albert Sambi Lokonga** – **Hamburger SV** – 2025–
- Gunther Schepens – Karlsruher SC – 1997–98
- Timmy Simons – 1. FC Nürnberg – 2010–13
- Hugo Siquet – SC Freiburg – 2021–23
- Wesley Sonck – Borussia M'gladbach – 2004–07
- Stéphane Stassin – Borussia M'gladbach – 2001–03
- Arthur Theate – Eintracht Frankfurt – 2024–26
- Bernd Thijs – Borussia M'gladbach – 2004–07
- Daniel Van Buyten – Hamburger SV, Bayern Munich – 2004–14
- Jelle Van Damme – Werder Bremen – 2005–06
- **Zeno Van Den Bosch** – **Union Berlin** – 2026–
- Peter Van Der Heyden – VfL Wolfsburg, Mainz 05 – 2005–08, 2009–10
- Siebe Van der Heyden – FC St. Pauli – 2024–25
- Roger Van Gool – 1. FC Köln – 1976–80
- Peter Van Houdt – Borussia M'gladbach, MSV Duisburg – 2001–04, 2005–06
- Joris Van Hout – Borussia M'gladbach, VfL Bochum – 2002–05, 2006–07
- Nico Van Kerckhoven – Schalke 04, Borussia M'gladbach – 1998–2005
- René Vandereycken – Blau-Weiß 90 Berlin – 1986–87
- **Maarten Vandevoordt** – **RB Leipzig** – 2024–
- Sven Vermant – Schalke 04 – 2001–05
- **Arthur Vermeeren** – **RB Leipzig** – 2024–
- Birger Verstraete – 1. FC Köln – 2019–20
- **Yorbe Vertessen** – **Union Berlin** – 2023–
- Aster Vranckx – VfL Wolfsburg – 2021–25
- Stijn Vreven – 1. FC Kaiserslautern – 2003–04
- Marc Wilmots – Schalke 04 – 1996–2000, 2001–02
- Axel Witsel – Borussia Dortmund – 2018–22

=== Bosnia and Herzegovina ===
Until 1992 part of SFR Yugoslavia

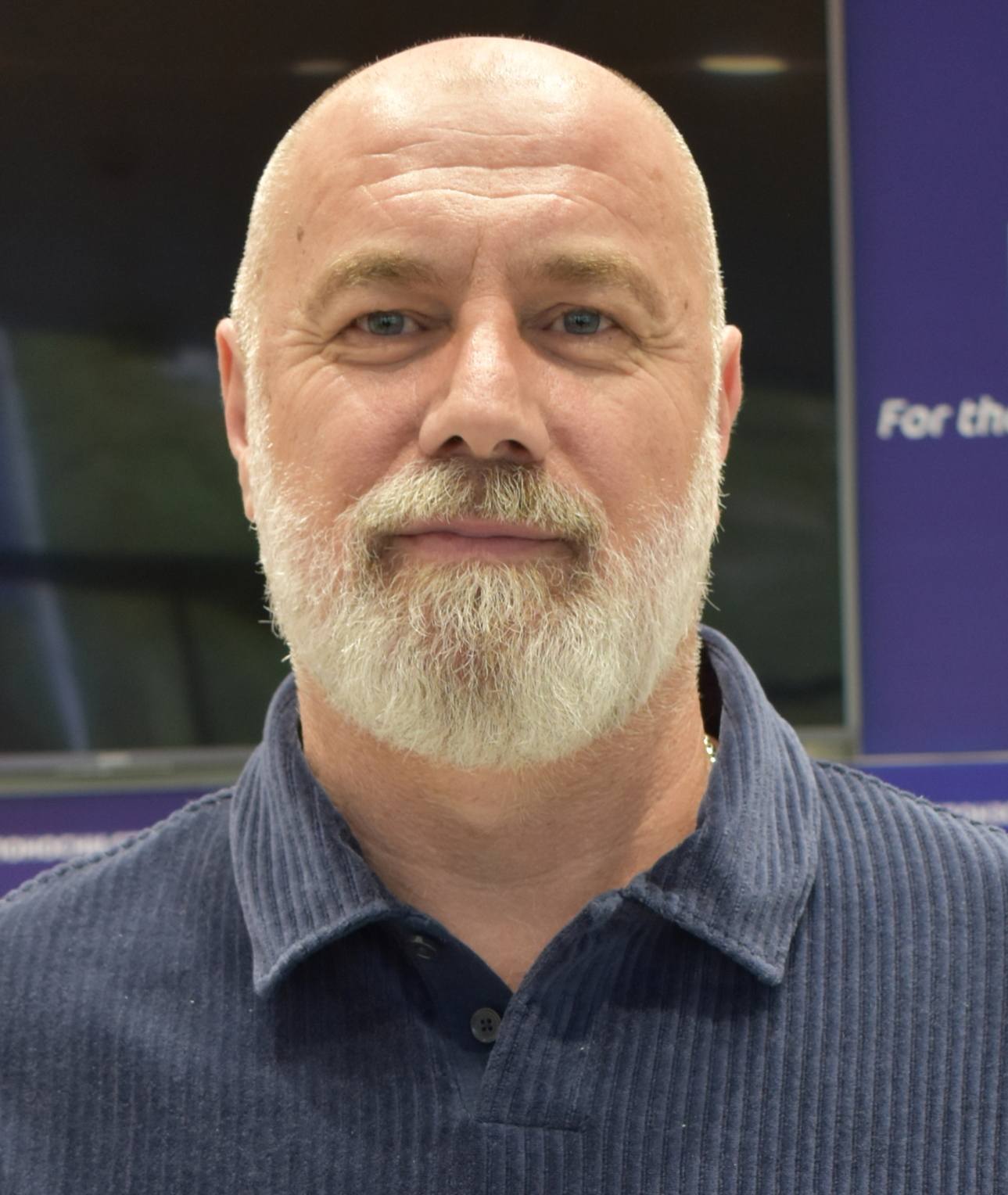
Sergej Barbarez, top goalscorer in 00–01

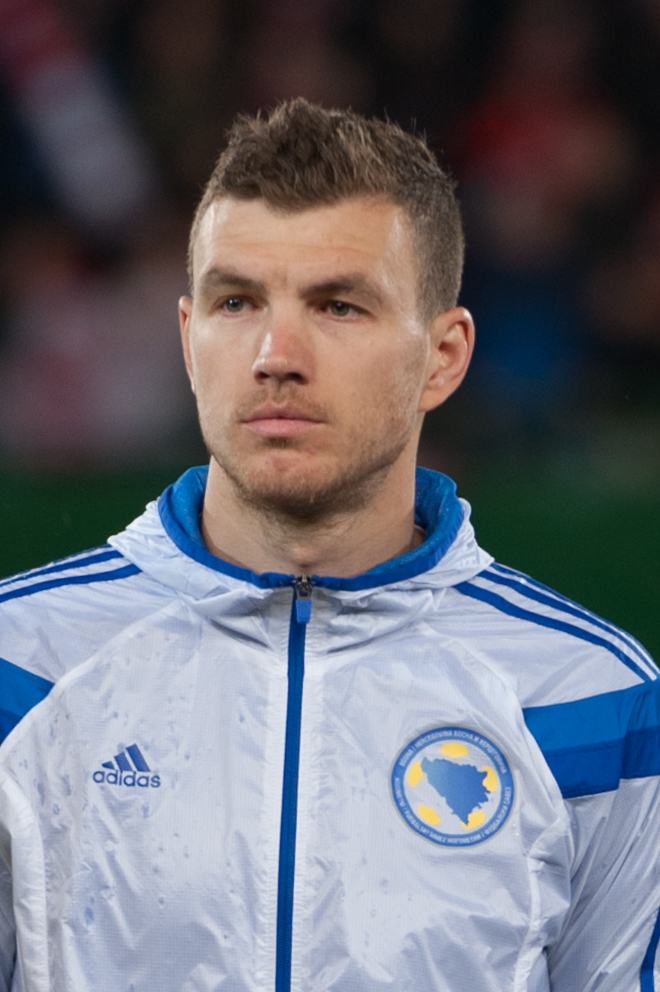
Edin Džeko, top goalscorer in 09–10

- Bruno Akrapović – Energie Cottbus – 2000–03
- Zlatan Bajramović – FC St. Pauli, SC Freiburg, Schalke 04, Eintracht Frankfurt – 2001–02, 2003–10
- Sergej Barbarez – Hansa Rostock, Borussia Dortmund, Hamburger SV, Bayer Leverkusen – 1996–2008
- Muhamed Bešić – Hamburger SV – 2010–11
- Ermin Bičakčić – VfB Stuttgart, Eintracht Braunschweig, TSG Hoffenheim – 2010–11, 2013–23
- Dženis Burnić – Borussia Dortmund, VfB Stuttgart – 2016–18
- Marijan Ćavar – Eintracht Frankfurt – 2017–18
- **Ermedin Demirović** – SC Freiburg, FC Augsburg, **VfB Stuttgart** – 2020–
- Radomir Dubovina – Kickers Offenbach – 1983–84
- **Luka Đurić** – **TSG Hoffenheim** – 2025–
- **Edin Džeko** – VfL Wolfsburg, **Schalke 04** – 2007–11, 2026–
- **Jusuf Gazibegović** – **1. FC Köln** – 2025–
- Armin Gigović – Holstein Kiel – 2024–25
- Vlatko Glavas – Fortuna Düsseldorf – 1995–97
- Ahmet Glavović – 1860 Munich – 1977–78
- Ivica Grlić – 1. FC Köln, MSV Duisburg – 2000–01, 2005–06, 2007–08
- Vladan Grujić – 1. FC Köln – 2003–04
- Benjamin Hadžić – Hannover 96 – 2018–19
- Izet Hajrović – Werder Bremen – 2014–15, 2016–18
- Idriz Hošić – 1. FC Kaiserslautern, MSV Duisburg – 1970–74
- Demir Hotić – Stuttgarter Kickers, VfB Stuttgart, 1. FC Kaiserslautern – 1988–93
- Mirko Hrgović – VfL Wolfsburg – 2003–05
- Faruk Hujdurović – Energie Cottbus – 2000–03
- Said Husejinović – Werder Bremen – 2008–11
- Denis Huseinbašić – 1. FC Köln – 2022–24
- Vedad Ibišević – Alemannia Aachen, TSG Hoffenheim, VfB Stuttgart, Hertha BSC, Schalke 04 – 2006–07, 2008–21
- Mato Jajalo – 1. FC Köln – 2010–12
- Zlatko Janjić – Arminia Bielefeld – 2008–09
- Murat Jašarević – MSV Duisburg – 1993–95
- Ivica Jozić – Wattenscheid 09 – 1993–94
- Sead Kajtaz – 1. FC Nürnberg – 1990–91
- Sead Kapetanović – VfL Wolfsburg, Borussia Dortmund – 1997–2001
- **Nikola Katić** – **Schalke 04** – 2026–
- Kenan Kodro – Mainz 05 – 2017–18
- Sead Kolašinac – Schalke 04 – 2012–17, 2020–21
- Enver Marić – Schalke 04 – 1976–78
- Radmilo Mihajlović – Bayern Munich, Schalke 04, Eintracht Frankfurt – 1989–94
- Zvjezdan Misimović – Bayern Munich, VfL Bochum, 1. FC Nürnberg, VfL Wolfsburg – 2002–05, 2006–11
- Mensur Mujdža – SC Freiburg – 2009–15
- Predrag Pašić – VfB Stuttgart – 1985–87
- Tomislav Piplica – Energie Cottbus – 2000–03, 2006–08
- Ivan Radeljić – Energie Cottbus – 2007–09
- Sead Ramović – VfL Wolfsburg – 2001–04
- Aleksandar Ristić – Eintracht Braunschweig – 1974–78
- **Imad Rondić** – **1. FC Köln** – 2026–
- Hasan Salihamidžić – Hamburger SV, Bayern Munich, VfL Wolfsburg – 1995–2007, 2011–12
- Sejad Salihović – Hertha BSC, TSG Hoffenheim, Hamburger SV – 2004–05, 2008–15, 2017–18
- Edhem Šljivo – 1. FC Köln – 1982–84
- Emir Spahić – Bayer Leverkusen, Hamburger SV – 2013–17
- Toni Šunjić – VfB Stuttgart – 2015–16
- Marko Topić – Energie Cottbus, VfL Wolfsburg – 2001–06
- Nikola Vasilj – FC St. Pauli – 2024–26
- Damir Vrančić – Mainz 05, Eintracht Braunschweig – 2006–07, 2013–14
- Mario Vrančić – Mainz 05, SC Paderborn, Darmstadt 98 – 2006–07, 2014–17
- Sead Zilić – Hertha BSC – 2000–01

=== Bulgaria ===
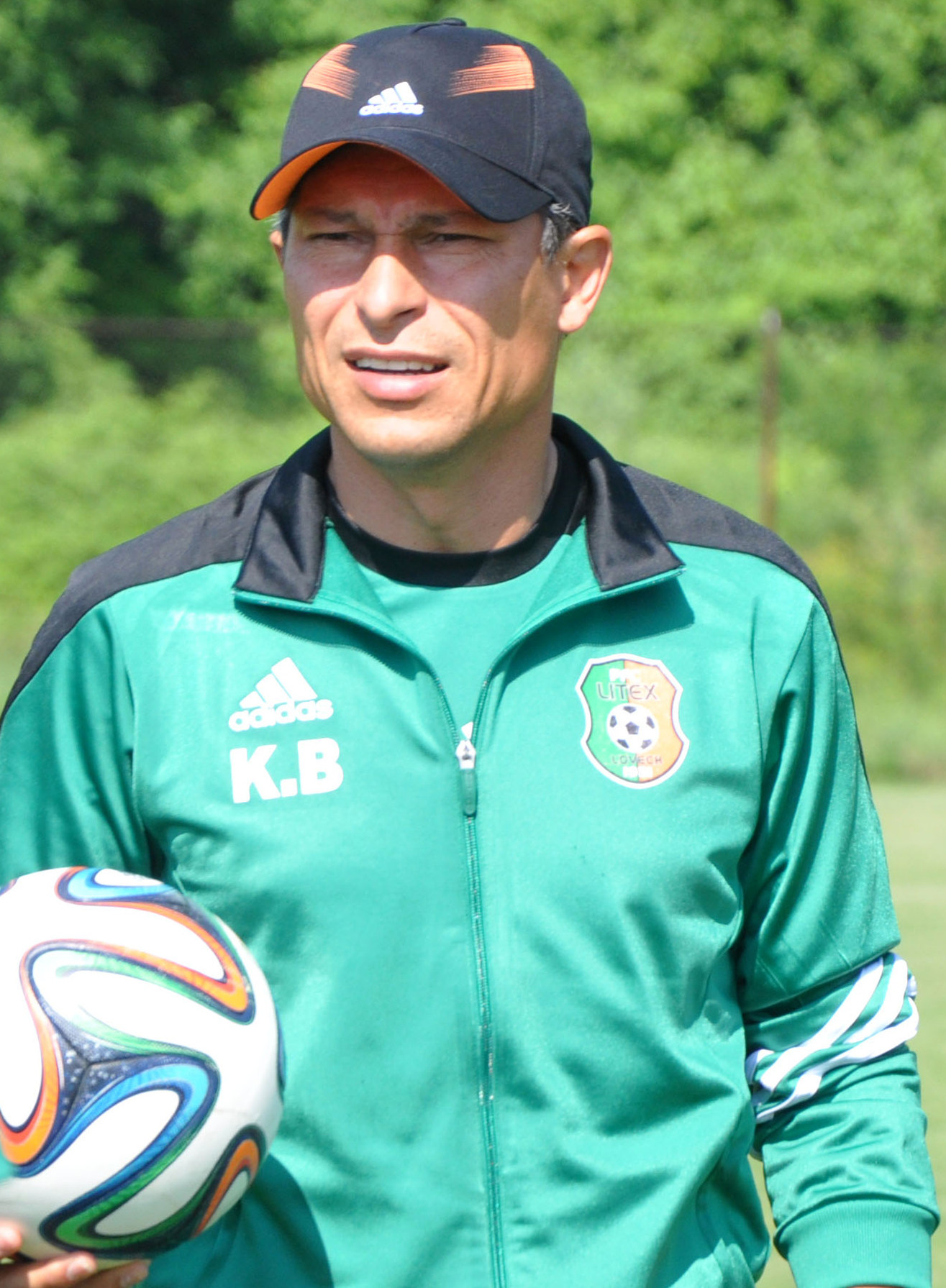
Krasimir Balakov was part of the "magic triangle" at VfB Stuttgart from 1995 to 1997 (together with Giovane Élber and Fredi Bobic).

- Antonio Ananiev – 1. FC Köln – 1996–97
- Stanislav Angelov – Energie Cottbus – 2007–09
- Krasimir Balakov – VfB Stuttgart – 1995–2003
- Dimitar Berbatov – Bayer Leverkusen – 2000–06
- Alexandar Bonchev – MSV Duisburg – 1991–92
- Daniel Borimirov – 1860 Munich – 1995–2004
- Pavel Dochev – Hamburger SV – 1992–93
- Valeri Domovchiyski – Hertha BSC – 2007–10
- Georgi Donkov – VfL Bochum, 1. FC Köln – 1996–98, 2000–02
- Blagoy Georgiev – MSV Duisburg – 2007–08
- Ilia Gruev – Werder Bremen – 2020–21, 2022–24
- Marian Hristov – 1. FC Kaiserslautern, VfL Wolfsburg – 1997–2007
- Petar Houbchev – Hamburger SV, Eintracht Frankfurt – 1993–97, 1998–2001
- Emil Kostadinov – Bayern Munich – 1994–96
- Yordan Letchkov – Hamburger SV – 1992–96
- Iliyan Mitsanski – 1. FC Kaiserslautern – 2010–11
- Aleksandar Mladenov – Hertha BSC – 2002–04
- Todor Nedelev – Mainz 05 – 2013–14
- Fabian Nürnberger – Darmstadt 98 – 2023–24
- **Lukas Petkov** – **SV Elversberg** – 2026–
- Martin Petrov – VfL Wolfsburg – 2001–05
- Dimitar Rangelov – Energie Cottbus, Borussia Dortmund – 2007–11
- Stoycho Stoilov – 1. FC Nürnberg – 2001–02
- Tsanko Tsvetanov – Energie Cottbus – 2000–01
- Chavdar Yankov – Hannover 96 – 2005–09
- Zlatko Yankov – KFC Uerdingen – 1995–96
- Hristo Yovov – 1860 Munich – 1997–99
- Adalbert Zafirov – Arminia Bielefeld – 1997–98
- Martin Zafirov – Hamburger SV – 1997–98

=== Croatia ===
Until 1991 part of SFR Yugoslavia

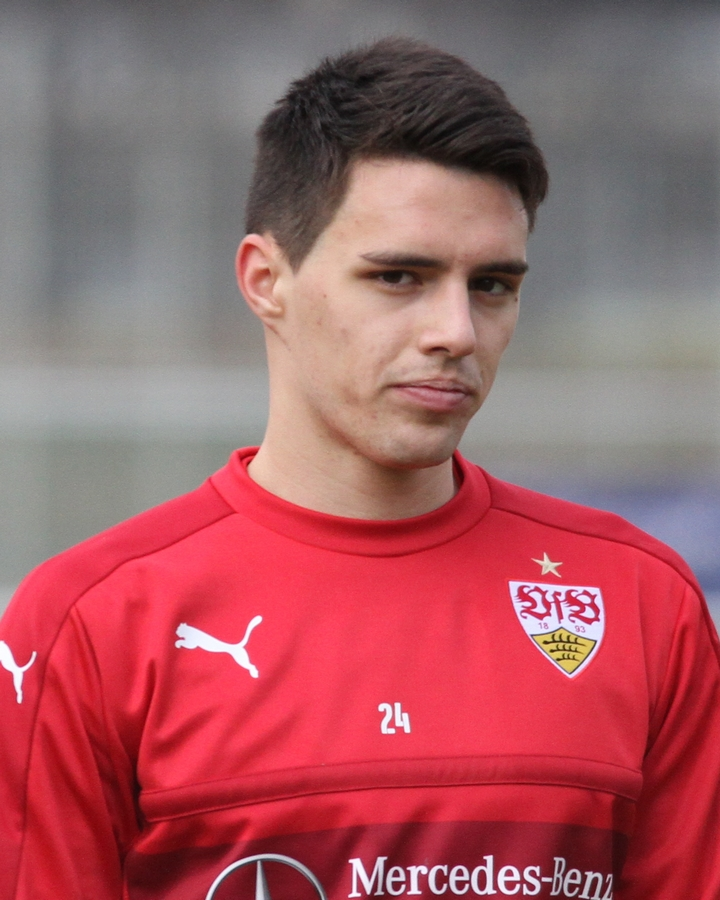
Josip Brekalo, topscorers in 2016-23

- Andrija Anković – 1. FC Kaiserslautern – 1966–68
- Ilija Aračić – Hertha BSC – 1998–2000
- Slađan Ašanin – Borussia M'gladbach – 1998–99, 2001–04
- Marko Babić – Bayer Leverkusen, Hertha BSC – 2000–07, 2008–09
- Milan Badelj – Hamburger SV – 2012–15
- Ivica Banović – Werder Bremen, 1. FC Nürnberg, SC Freiburg – 2000–07, 2009–11
- Dion Drena Beljo – FC Augsburg – 2022–24
- Leon Benko – 1. FC Nürnberg – 2006–08
- Miroslav Bičanić – Hansa Rostock, MSV Duisburg – 1996–97, 1998–99
- Slaven Bilić – Karlsruher SC – 1993–96
- Marino Biliškov – VfL Wolfsburg, MSV Duisburg – 1999–2006
- Nenad Bjelica – 1. FC Kaiserslautern – 2000–04
- Elvis Brajković – 1860 Munich – 1994–96
- Josip Brekalo – VfL Wolfsburg, VfB Stuttgart – 2016–23
- Srećko Bogdan – Karlsruher SC – 1987–93
- Mario Boljat – Schalke 04 – 1979–80
- Luka Bonačić – VfL Bochum – 1979–80
- Tihomir Bulat – FC St. Pauli – 2001–02
- Ivan Buljan – Hamburger SV – 1977–81
- Damir Burić – Waldhof Mannheim, SC Freiburg – 1988–90, 1993–97, 1998–99
- Hrvoje Čale – VfL Wolfsburg – 2011–12
- Mario Carević – VfB Stuttgart – 2005–06
- Dragutin Čelić – Hertha BSC – 1990–91
- Antonio Čolak – 1. FC Nürnberg, Darmstadt 98 – 2013–14, 2016–17
- David Čolina – FC Augsburg – 2022–23
- Vedran Ćorluka – Bayer Leverkusen – 2011–12
- Ante Čović – VfB Stuttgart, Hertha BSC, VfL Bochum – 1994–95, 1997–2001
- **Patrice Čović** – **Werder Bremen** – 2025–
- Zvjezdan Cvetković – Waldhof Mannheim – 1987–90
- Mario Cvitanović – Energie Cottbus – 2006–09
- Darko Dražić – Fortuna Düsseldorf – 1991–92, 1995–97
- Dino Drpić – Karlsruher SC – 2008–09
- Vilson Džoni – Schalke 04 – 1979–81
- Josip Elez – Hannover 96 – 2017–19
- Tomislav Erceg – MSV Duisburg – 1996–97
- Petar Filipović – FC St. Pauli – 2010–11
- Bartol Franjić – VfL Wolfsburg, Darmstadt 98 – 2022–24
- Joško Gvardiol – RB Leipzig – 2021–23
- Alen Halilović – Hamburger SV – 2016–17
- Ivo Iličević – VfL Bochum, 1. FC Kaiserslautern, Hamburger SV, 1. FC Nürnberg – 2006–08, 2010–16, 2018–19
- Kristijan Ipša – Energie Cottbus – 2007–08
- **Kristijan Jakić** – Eintracht Frankfurt, **FC Augsburg** – 2021–
- Tin Jedvaj – Bayer Leverkusen, FC Augsburg – 2014–21
- **Josip Juranović** – **Union Berlin** – 2022–
- Nikola Jurčević – SC Freiburg – 1995–97
- Vlado Kasalo – 1. FC Nürnberg – 1989–91

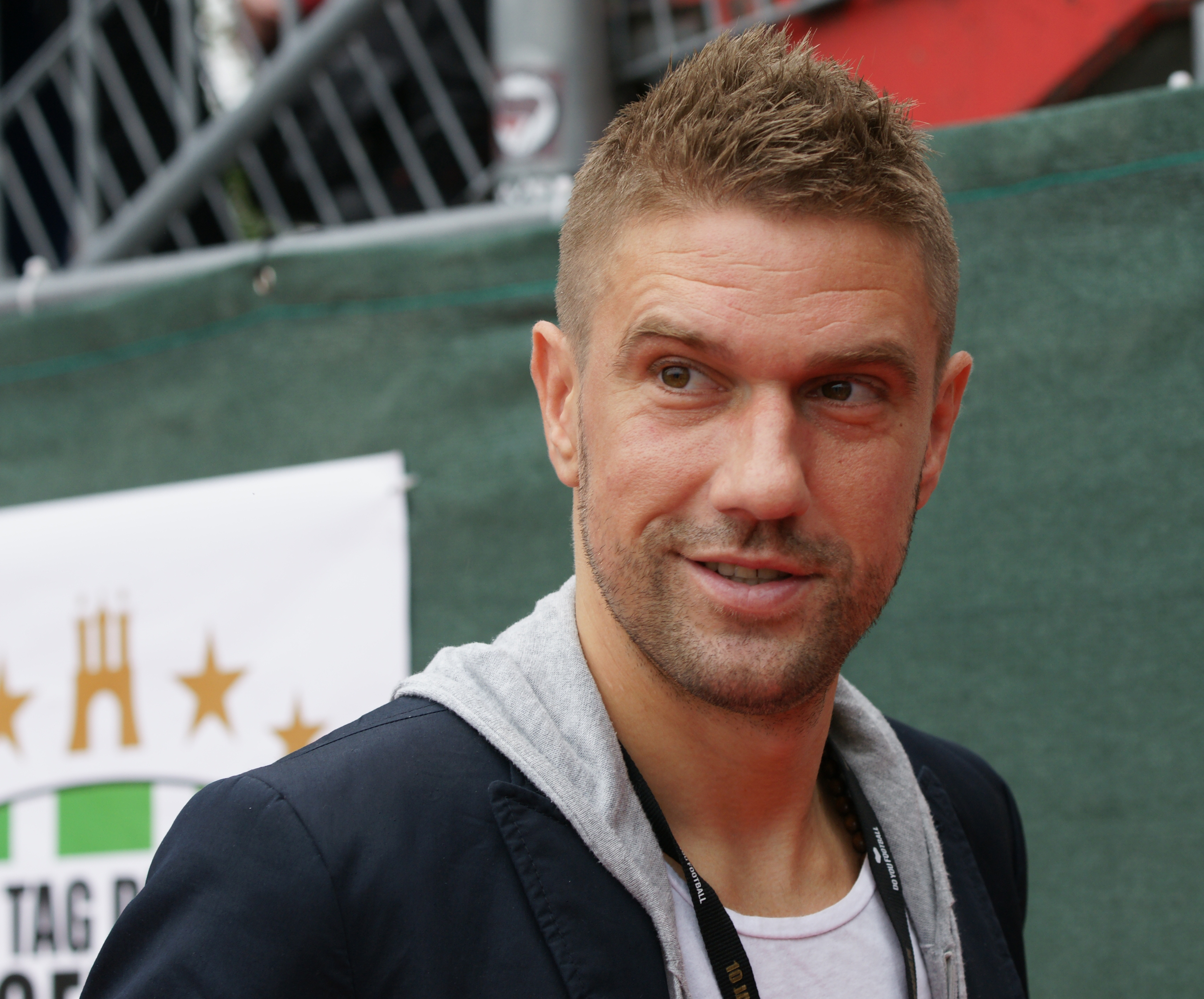
Striker Ivan Klasnić played a key role in Werder Bremen's 2000s success, culminating in winning the double of German championship and DFB-Pokal in 2003–04.

- Ivan Klasnić – Werder Bremen, Mainz 05 – 2001–08, 2012–13
- Fabijan Komljenović – Schalke 04 – 1993–94
- Niko Kovač – Bayer Leverkusen, Hamburger SV, Bayern Munich, Hertha BSC – 1996–2006
- Robert Kovač – Bayer Leverkusen, Bayern Munich, Borussia Dortmund – 1996–2005, 2007–09
- Marijan Kovačević – Hamburger SV, VfL Wolfsburg, MSV Duisburg, VfB Stuttgart – 1993–2000, 2008–09
- Vladimir Kovačić – Hamburger SV – 1974–75, 1976–77
- **Andrej Kramarić** – **TSG Hoffenheim** – 2015–
- Dario Krešić – Bayer Leverkusen – 2015–16
- Davor Krznarić – Borussia M'gladbach – 1995–96
- Antun Labak – Energie Cottbus – 2000–02
- **Nediljko Labrović** – **FC Augsburg** – 2024–
- Srđan Lakić – Hertha BSC, 1. FC Kaiserslautern, VfL Wolfsburg, TSG Hoffenheim, Eintracht Frankfurt, SC Paderborn – 2006–08, 2010–15
- Krešo Ljubičić – Eintracht Frankfurt – 2007–09
- **Marin Ljubičić** – **Union Berlin** – 2024–
- Davor Lovren – Fortuna Düsseldorf – 2018–19
- Matej Maglica – VfB Stuttgart, Darmstadt 98 – 2021–22, 2023–24
- Nikica Maglica – Dynamo Dresden – 1993–95
- Lovro Majer – VfL Wolfsburg – 2023–26
- Vladimir Maljković – Eintracht Frankfurt – 2000–01
- Zoran Mamić – VfL Bochum, Bayer Leverkusen – 1996–2001
- Mario Mandžukić – VfL Wolfsburg, Bayern Munich – 2010–14
- Marijo Marić – VfL Bochum, Arminia Bielefeld – 2000–01, 2004–05
- Tomislav Marić – Karlsruher SC, VfL Wolfsburg, Borussia M'gladbach – 1994–95, 2000–05
- **Igor Matanović** – **Eintracht Frankfurt** – 2024–
- Jakov Medić – VfL Bochum – 2024–25
- Andre Mijatović – Arminia Bielefeld, Hertha BSC – 2007–09, 2011–12
- Mihael Mikić – 1. FC Kaiserslautern – 2004–06
- Stjepan Milardović – FC St. Pauli – 1977–78
- Zdenko Miletić – Arminia Bielefeld – 1996–98, 1999–2000
- Damir Milinović – VfL Bochum – 2000–01
- Ivica Mornar – Eintracht Frankfurt – 1995–96
- Petar Musa – Union Berlin – 2020–21
- Ivan Nekić – Holstein Kiel – 2024–25
- Ivica Olić – Hertha BSC, Hamburger SV, Bayern Munich, VfL Wolfsburg – 1998–99, 2006–16
- Igor Pamić – Hansa Rostock – 1997–99
- Zvonko Pamić – SC Freiburg – 2010–11
- Andrej Panadić – Hamburger SV – 1997–2002
- Marco Pašalić – Borussia Dortmund – 2022–23
- Ivan Paurević – Fortuna Düsseldorf – 2012–13
- Mateo Pavlović – Werder Bremen – 2012–13
- Ivan Perišić – Borussia Dortmund, VfL Wolfsburg, Bayern Munich – 2011–16, 2019–20
- Željko Perušić – 1860 Munich – 1965–70
- **Noah Pesch** – **Borussia M'gladbach** – 2024–
- Mladen Petrić – Borussia Dortmund, Hamburger SV – 2007–12
- Alen Petrović – VfL Bochum – 1998–99
- Marko Pjaca – Schalke 04 – 2017–18
- Marin Pongračić – VfL Wolfsburg, Borussia Dortmund – 2019–22
- Mladen Pralija – Hamburger SV – 1987–88
- Danijel Pranjić – Bayern Munich – 2009–12
- **Ivan Prtajin** – **Union Berlin** – 2024–
- Jurica Puljiz – Eintracht Frankfurt – 2003–04
- Ivan Rakitić – Schalke 04 – 2007–11
- Ante Rebić – Eintracht Frankfurt – 2016–20
- Stiven Rivić – Energie Cottbus, 1. FC Kaiserslautern – 2006–09, 2010–11
- Ivica Šangulin – Hertha BSC – 1968–69
- Ivan Santini – SC Freiburg – 2011–13
- Vlado Šarić – Rot-Weiss Essen – 1966–67
- Ivica Senzen – 1860 Munich – 1979–81
- Kujtim Shala – Fortuna Düsseldorf – 1995–96
- Josip Šimunić – Hamburger SV, Hertha BSC, TSG Hoffenheim – 1997–98, 1999–2011
- Josip Skoblar – Hannover 96 – 1967–70
- Zlatko Škorić – VfB Stuttgart – 1971–72
- Petar Slišković – Mainz 05 – 2010–15
- **Hrvoje Smolčić** – **Eintracht Frankfurt** – 2022–
- **Nikola Soldo** – **1. FC Köln** – 2022–
- Zvonimir Soldo – VfB Stuttgart – 1996–2006
- Željko Sopić – Borussia M'gladbach – 1998–99
- Borna Sosa – VfB Stuttgart – 2018–19, 2020–24
- Jozo Stanić – FC Augsburg – 2018–19
- **Josip Stanišić** – **Bayern Munich**, Bayer Leverkusen – 2020–
- Danijel Štefulj – Hannover 96 – 2002–05
- Davor Šuker – 1860 Munich – 2001–03
- Ivan Šunjić – Hertha BSC – 2022–23
- Josip Tadić – Bayer Leverkusen – 2005–06
- Filip Tapalović – VfL Bochum, Schalke 04, 1860 Munich – 1996–97, 1998–2005
- Zoran Tomčić – VfL Wolfsburg – 1997–98
- Samir Toplak – VfL Bochum – 1998–99, 2000–01
- Filip Uremović – Hertha BSC – 2022–23
- Miro Varvodić – 1. FC Köln – 2010–12
- Domagoj Vida – Bayer Leverkusen – 2010–11
- **Gabriel Vidović** – Bayern Munich, Mainz 05, **SC Paderborn** – 2021–23, 2024–
- Jurica Vranješ – Bayer Leverkusen, VfB Stuttgart, Werder Bremen – 1999–2009
- Bojan Vručina – MSV Duisburg – 2007–08
- Goran Vučević – 1. FC Köln – 1997–98
- Anton Vučkov – Bayern Munich – 1965–66
- Robert Vujević – VfB Stuttgart – 2001–02
- Luka Vušković – Hamburger SV – 2025–26
- Boris Živković – Bayer Leverkusen, VfB Stuttgart, 1. FC Köln – 1997–2006
- Ivan Žugčić – VfL Bochum – 1980–85, 1986–87
- Lovro Zvonarek – Bayern Munich – 2023–24

=== Cyprus ===
- Efstathios Aloneftis – Energie Cottbus – 2007–08
- Rainer Rauffmann – Eintracht Frankfurt, Arminia Bielefeld – 1995–97 (Note: Held Cypriot citizenship only from 2002 onwards, so he was not a foreign Bundesliga player in 1995–97.)

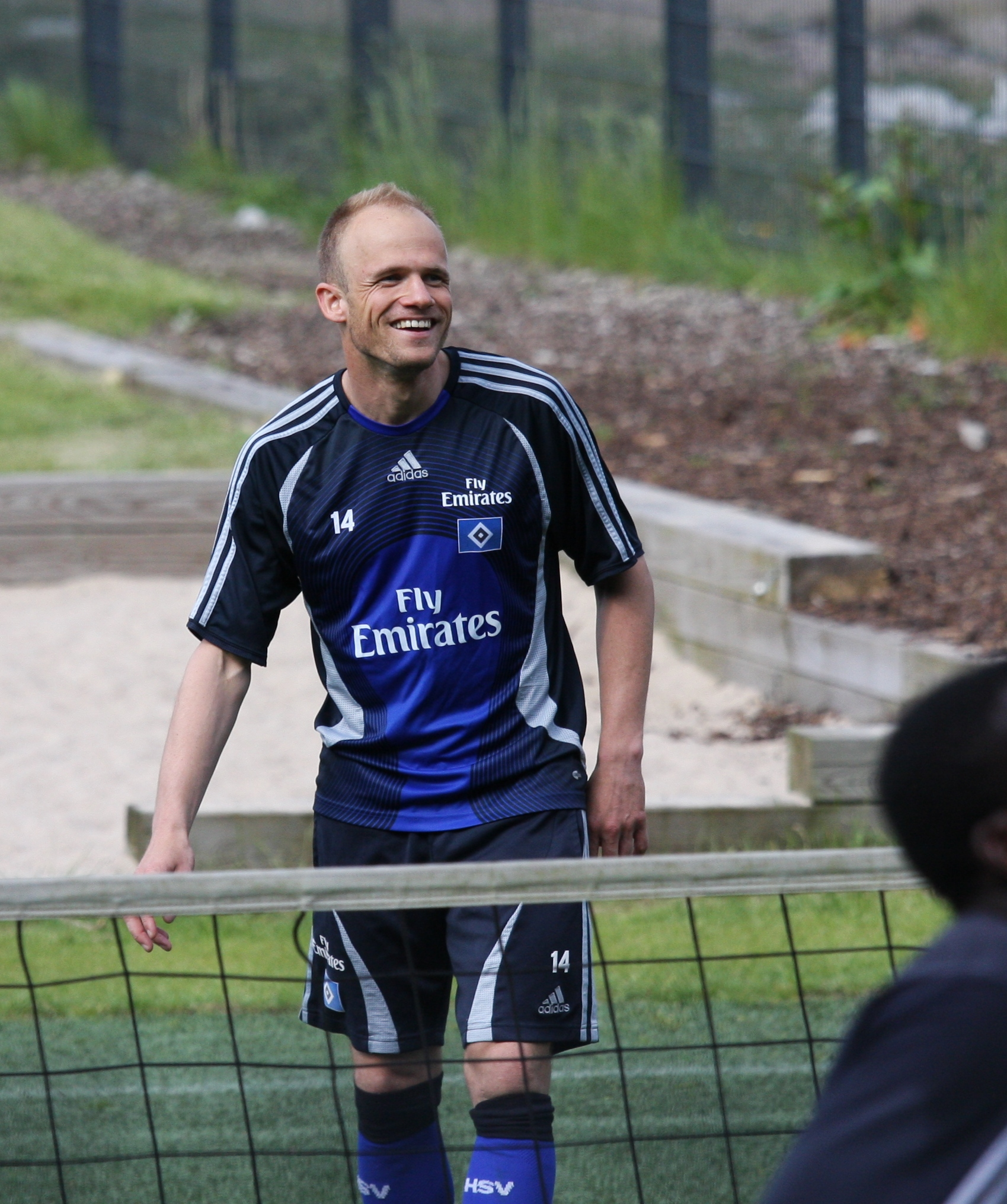
Central midfielder David Jarolím, 2008–2010 Hamburger SV captain, made 318 appearances in the Bundesliga.

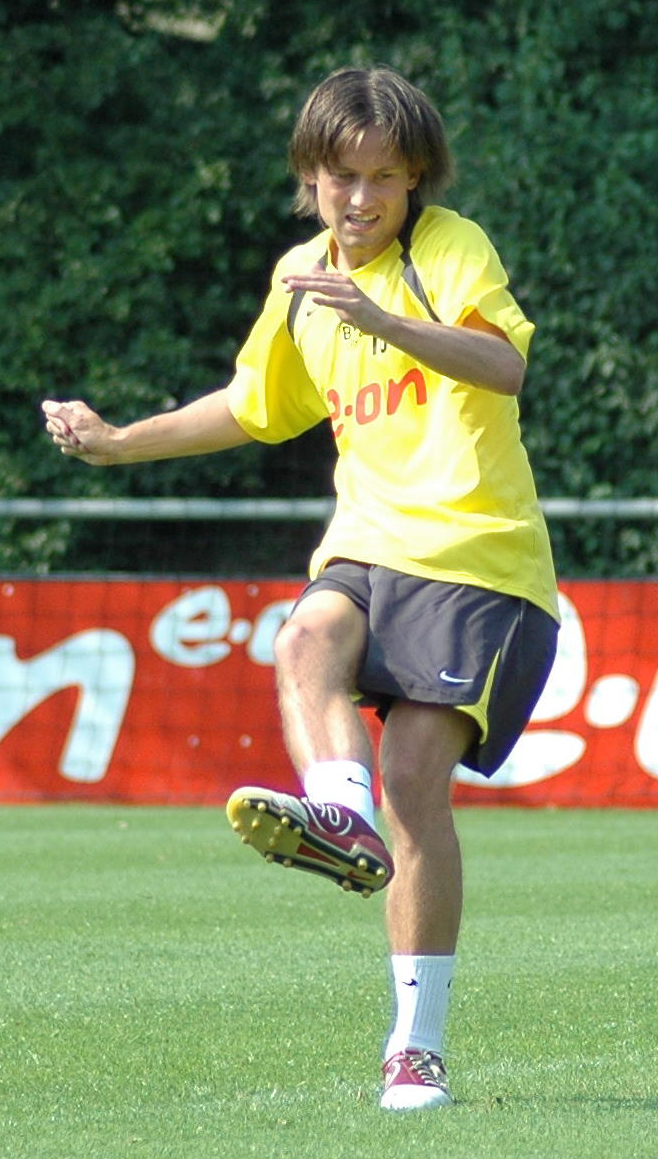
in January 2001, playmaker Tomáš Rosický joined Borussia Dortmund for a then Bundesliga record transfer fee of DM 25 million (€12.5 million).

=== Czech Republic ===
Until 1992 Czechoslovakia

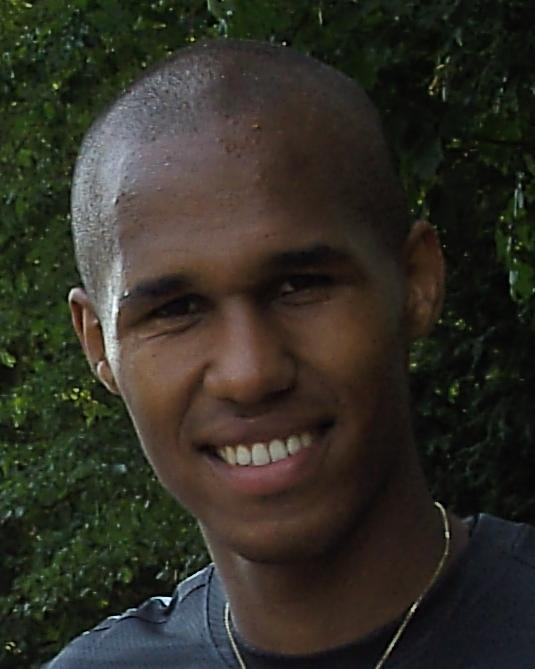
Theodor Gebre Selassie

- Lukáš Ambros – VfL Wolfsburg – 2022–23
- Miroslav Baranek – 1. FC Köln – 2000–02
- Patrik Berger – Borussia Dortmund – 1995–96
- Jiří Bílek – 1. FC Kaiserslautern – 2010–11
- Günter Bittengel – KFC Uerdingen – 1992–93, 1994–96
- Jaromír Blažek – 1. FC Nürnberg – 2007–08
- Václav Černý – VfL Wolfsburg – 2023–24, 2025–26
- Pavel Chaloupka – Fortuna Düsseldorf – 1989–90
- Martin Čížek – 1860 Munich, SpVgg Unterhaching – 1998–2001
- **Vladimír Coufal** – **TSG Hoffenheim** – 2025–
- **Tomáš Čvančara** – **Borussia M'gladbach** – 2023–
- Vladimír Darida – SC Freiburg, Hertha BSC – 2013–23
- Pavel David – 1. FC Nürnberg – 2001–03
- Pavel Drsek – MSV Duisburg, VfL Bochum – 1999–2000, 2006–08
- Jaroslav Drobný – VfL Bochum, Hertha BSC, Hamburger SV, Werder Bremen, Fortuna Düsseldorf – 2006–17, 2018–19
- Yannick Eduardo – TSG Hoffenheim – 2025–26
- Martin Fenin – Eintracht Frankfurt – 2007–11
- Martin Frýdek – Bayer Leverkusen, MSV Duisburg – 1997–99
- Milan Fukal – Hamburger SV, Borussia M'gladbach – 2000–06
- Petr Gabriel – 1. FC Kaiserslautern, Arminia Bielefeld – 2001–02, 2004–08
- Tomáš Galásek – 1. FC Nürnberg, Borussia M'gladbach – 2006–09
- Theodor Gebre Selassie – Werder Bremen – 2012–21
- Pavel Hapal – Bayer Leverkusen – 1992–95
- Marek Heinz – Hamburger SV, Arminia Bielefeld, Borussia M'gladbach – 2000–03, 2004–06
- Adam Hloušek – 1. FC Kaiserslautern, 1. FC Nürnberg, VfB Stuttgart – 2010–16
- **Adam Hložek** – Bayer Leverkusen, **TSG Hoffenheim** – 2022–
- **Robin Hranáč** – **TSG Hoffenheim** – 2024–
- Roman Hubník – Hertha BSC – 2009–10, 2011–12
- David Jarolím – Bayern Munich, 1. FC Nürnberg, Hamburger SV – 1998–99, 2001–12
- Petr Jiráček – VfL Wolfsburg, Hamburger SV – 2012–15
- **David Jurásek** – **TSG Hoffenheim** – 2023–
- Pavel Kadeřábek – TSG Hoffenheim – 2015–25
- Michal Kadlec – Bayer Leverkusen – 2008–13
- Miroslav Kadlec – 1. FC Kaiserslautern – 1990–96, 1997–98
- Václav Kadlec – Eintracht Frankfurt – 2013–16
- Jiří Kaufman – Hannover 96 – 2002–03, 2004–05
- Jan Kliment – VfB Stuttgart – 2015–16
- Ivo Knoflíček – FC St. Pauli, VfL Bochum – 1989–92
- David Kobylík – Arminia Bielefeld – 2005–08
- Jan Koller – Borussia Dortmund, 1. FC Nürnberg – 2001–06, 2007–08
- Tomáš Koubek – FC Augsburg – 2019–20
- Matěj Kovář – Bayer Leverkusen – 2023–25
- Michal Kovář – Hansa Rostock – 2002–04
- **Alex Král** – Schalke 04, **Union Berlin** – 2022–24, 2025–
- Pavel Krmaš – SC Freiburg – 2009–15
- Luboš Kubík – 1. FC Nürnberg – 1993–94
- Radim Kučera – Arminia Bielefeld – 2005–09
- Pavel Kuka – 1. FC Kaiserslautern, 1. FC Nürnberg, VfB Stuttgart – 1993–96, 1997–2000
- Karel Kula – Stuttgarter Kickers, Wattenscheid 09 – 1991–94
- Jan Laštůvka – VfL Bochum – 2007–08
- Radoslav Látal – Schalke 04 – 1994–2001
- Martin Latka – Fortuna Düsseldorf – 2012–13
- Vratislav Lokvenc – 1. FC Kaiserslautern, VfL Bochum – 2000–05
- Pavel Mačák – Schalke 04 – 1984–85, 1986–87
- Oldřich Machala – Hansa Rostock – 1991–92
- Jan Morávek – Schalke 04, 1. FC Kaiserslautern, FC Augsburg – 2009–14, 2015–22
- Jiří Němec – Schalke 04 – 1993–2002
- Marek Nikl – 1. FC Nürnberg – 1998–99, 2001–2003, 2004–07
- Pavel Novotný – VfL Wolfsburg – 1997–98
- Josef Obajdin – Eintracht Frankfurt – 1994–95
- Tomáš Ostrák – 1. FC Köln – 2021–22
- Michal Papadopulos – Bayer Leverkusen, Energie Cottbus – 2005–08
- Jiří Pavlenka – Werder Bremen – 2017–21, 2022–24
- Tomáš Pekhart – 1. FC Nürnberg, FC Ingolstadt – 2011–14, 2015–16
- Ondřej Petrák – 1. FC Nürnberg – 2013–14, 2018–19
- Milan Petržela – FC Augsburg – 2012–13
- Václav Pilař – SC Freiburg – 2013–14
- Jan Polák – 1. FC Nürnberg, VfL Wolfsburg – 2005–07, 2010–14
- Zdeněk Pospěch – Mainz 05 – 2011–14
- Karel Rada – Eintracht Frankfurt – 2000–01
- Petr Rada – Fortuna Düsseldorf – 1989–90
- Jan Rajnoch – Energie Cottbus – 2008–09
- František Rajtoral – Hannover 96 – 2013–14
- Tomáš Rosický – Borussia Dortmund – 2000–06
- David Rozehnal – Hamburger SV – 2009–10
- Petr Ruman – Mainz 05 – 2005–07
- **Patrik Schick** – RB Leipzig, **Bayer Leverkusen** – 2019–
- Roman Sedláček – Hansa Rostock – 1991–92
- Horst Siegl – 1. FC Kaiserslautern – 1995–96
- Jan Šimák – Bayer Leverkusen, Hannover 96, VfB Stuttgart, Mainz 05 – 2002–04, 2008–11
- Jan Šimůnek – VfL Wolfsburg, 1. FC Kaiserslautern – 2007–10, 2011–12
- Rudolf Skácel – Hertha BSC – 2007–08
- Jiří Štajner – Hannover 96 – 2002–10
- František Straka – Borussia M'gladbach, Hansa Rostock – 1988–92
- Marek Suchý – FC Augsburg – 2019–21
- Václav Svěrkoš – Borussia M'gladbach, Hertha BSC – 2003–07
- Filip Trojan – Schalke 04, VfL Bochum, Mainz 05 – 2002–05, 2006–07, 2009–10
- Roman Týce – 1860 Munich – 1998–2004
- Tomáš Ujfaluši – Hamburger SV – 2000–04
- Ivo Ulich – Borussia M'gladbach – 2001–05
- Kamil Vacek – Arminia Bielefeld – 2005–06
- Robert Vágner – Energie Cottbus – 2002–03
- Tomáš Votava – 1860 Munich – 1999–2003

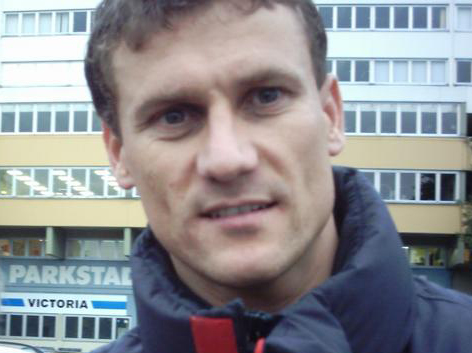
Ebbe Sand, top goalscorer in 00–01

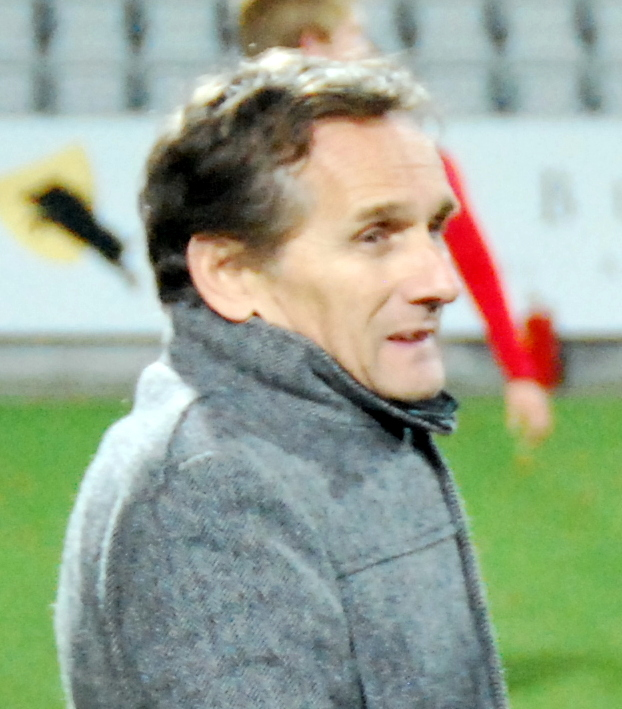
Allan Simonsen was awarded European Footballer of the Year in 1977.

=== Denmark ===
- Henrik Agerbeck – Hertha BSC – 1978–80
- Andreas Albers – FC St. Pauli – 2024–26
- Erik Bo Andersen – MSV Duisburg – 1998–2000
- Henrik Andersen – 1. FC Köln – 1990–98
- Leon Andreasen – Werder Bremen, Mainz 05, Hannover 96 – 2005–16
- **Jonathan Asp Jensen** – **Bayern Munich** – 2023–24
- Thomas Bælum – MSV Duisburg – 2005–06
- Patrick Banggaard – Darmstadt 98 – 2016–17
- Jacob Barrett Laursen – Arminia Bielefeld – 2020–22
- Jan Bartram – Bayer Uerdingen – 1988–91
- Lars Bastrup – Kickers Offenbach, Hamburger SV – 1975–76, 1981–83
- Uffe Bech – Hannover 96 – 2015–16, 2018–19
- Tommy Bechmann – VfL Bochum, SC Freiburg – 2004–05, 2006–08, 2009–10
- Nicklas Bendtner – VfL Wolfsburg – 2014–16
- Emil Berggreen – Mainz 05 – 2017–18
- Ole Bjørnmose – Werder Bremen, Hamburger SV – 1966–71, 1971–77
- Kasper Bøgelund – Borussia M'gladbach – 2005–07
- **William Bøving** – **Mainz 05** – 2025–
- Lars Brøgger – Fortuna Düsseldorf – 1991–92
- Jacob Bruun Larsen – Borussia Dortmund, VfB Stuttgart, TSG Hoffenheim – 2017–23, 2024–25
- Rasmus Carstensen – 1. FC Köln – 2023–24
- Andreas Christensen – Borussia M'gladbach – 2015–17
- Bent Christensen – Schalke 04 – 1991–93
- Jacob Steen Christensen – 1. FC Köln – 2023–24
- Kim Christensen – Hamburger SV – 2001–03
- Oliver Christensen – Hertha BSC – 2022–23
- Kim Christofte – 1. FC Köln – 1992–94
- Søren Colding – VfL Bochum – 2000–01, 2002–05
- Adam Daghim – VfL Wolfsburg – 2025–26
- Peter Dahl – Hannover 96 – 1973–74, 1975–76
- John Danielsen – Werder Bremen – 1965–70
- Thomas Delaney – Werder Bremen, Borussia Dortmund, TSG Hoffenheim – 2016–21, 2022–23
- Kasper Dolberg – TSG Hoffenheim – 2022–23
- Preben Elkjær – 1. FC Köln – 1976–77
- Christian Eriksen – VfL Wolfsburg – 2025–26
- Wahid Faghir – VfB Stuttgart – 2021–22
- Ulrik le Fevre – Borussia M'gladbach – 1969–72
- Christian Flindt Bjerg – Karlsruher SC – 1994–95
- Ove Flindt Bjerg – Karlsruher SC – 1975–77
- Viktor Fischer – Mainz 05 – 2017–18
- Oscar Fraulo – Borussia M'gladbach – 2022–23, 2025–26
- Jakob Friis-Hansen – Hamburger SV – 1996–97
- Bjarne Goldbæk – Schalke 04, 1. FC Kaiserslautern, 1. FC Köln – 1987–88, 1989–96
- Peter Graulund – VfL Bochum – 2002–03
- Thomas Gravesen – Hamburger SV – 1997–2000
- Michael Gravgaard – Hamburger SV – 2008–09
- **Albert Grønbæk** – **Hamburger SV** – 2025–
- Jesper Grønkjær – VfB Stuttgart – 2005–06
- Allan Hansen – Hamburger SV – 1982–84
- Johnny Hansen – 1. FC Nürnberg, Bayern Munich – 1968–69, 1970–76
- Martin Hansen – FC Ingolstadt – 2016–17
- **Conrad Harder** – **RB Leipzig** – 2025–
- Jan Heintze – KFC Uerdingen, Bayer Leverkusen – 1994–99
- Thomas Helveg – Borussia M'gladbach – 2005–07
- Pierre-Emile Højbjerg – Bayern Munich, FC Augsburg, Schalke 04 – 2013–16
- Jan Højland Nielsen – 1860 Munich – 1977–78
- **Oscar Højlund** – **Eintracht Frankfurt** – 2024–
- Ken Ilsø – Fortuna Düsseldorf – 2012–13
- Marcus Ingvartsen – Union Berlin, Mainz 05 – 2019–23
- Lars Jacobsen – Hamburger SV – 2002–04
- Bent Jensen – Eintracht Braunschweig – 1972–73
- Daniel Jensen – Werder Bremen – 2004–11
- Henning Jensen – Borussia M'gladbach – 1972–76
- Jann Jensen – 1. FC Köln, VfL Wolfsburg – 1988–93, 1997–98
- John Jensen – Hamburger SV – 1988–90
- Niclas Jensen – Borussia Dortmund – 2003–05
- Viggo Jensen – Bayern Munich – 1973–74
- Allan Jepsen – Hamburger SV – 1997–99
- Leon Jessen – 1. FC Kaiserslautern – 2010–12
- Bo Elvar Jørgensen – Waldhof Mannheim – 1986–88
- Mathias Jørgensen – Fortuna Düsseldorf – 2019–20
- Nicolai Jørgensen – Bayer Leverkusen – 2010–12
- Thomas Kahlenberg – VfL Wolfsburg – 2009–11, 2012–13
- Jonas Kamper – Arminia Bielefeld – 2006–09
- Mikkel Kaufmann – Union Berlin, 1. FC Heidenheim – 2023–26
- Simon Kjær – VfL Wolfsburg – 2010–13
- Jørgen Kristensen – Hertha BSC – 1976–78
- Rasmus Kristensen – Eintracht Frankfurt – 2024–26
- Jan Kristiansen – 1. FC Nürnberg – 2005–08
- William Kvist – VfB Stuttgart – 2011–14
- Søren Larsen – Schalke 04 – 2005–08
- Brian Laudrup – Bayer Uerdingen, Bayern Munich – 1989–92
- Søren Lerby – Bayern Munich – 1983–86
- Jesper Lindstrøm – Eintracht Frankfurt, VfL Wolfsburg – 2021–24, 2025–26
- Jonas Lössl – Mainz 05 – 2016–17
- Peter Løvenkrands – Schalke 04 – 2006–08
- Michael Lumb – SC Freiburg – 2011–12
- Flemming Lund – Rot-Weiss Essen, Fortuna Düsseldorf – 1976–79
- Lars Lunde – Bayern Munich – 1986–88
- Kim Madsen – VfL Wolfsburg, Hansa Rostock – 2002–05
- Michael Madsen – VfL Wolfsburg – 2001–02
- Peter Madsen – VfL Wolfsburg, VfL Bochum, 1. FC Köln – 2002–06
- Joakim Mæhle – VfL Wolfsburg – 2023–26
- Allan Michaelsen – Eintracht Braunschweig – 1972–73
- Tobias Mikkelsen – Greuther Fürth – 2012–13
- Johnny Mølby – Borussia M'gladbach – 1992–94
- **Nikolas Nartey** – 1. FC Köln, **VfB Stuttgart** – 2017–18, 2021–23, 2024–
- Ole Møller Nielsen – VfL Bochum – 1986–87
- Alex Nielsen – Schalke 04 – 1987–88
- Allan Nielsen – Bayern Munich – 1990–91
- Carsten Nielsen – Borussia M'gladbach – 1976–81
- David Nielsen – Fortuna Düsseldorf – 1996–97
- Peter Nielsen – Borussia M'gladbach – 1992–97, 2001–02
- Morten Olsen – 1. FC Köln – 1986–89
- Kristian Pedersen – 1. FC Köln – 2022–23
- Per Pedersen – Borussia M'gladbach – 1997–98
- **Malik Pimpong** – **Eintracht Frankfurt** – 2026–
- Christian Poulsen – Schalke 04 – 2002–06
- Kaj Poulsen – Hannover 96 – 1966–68
- Niels Poulsen – 1860 Munich – 1979–80
- **Yussuf Poulsen** – RB Leipzig, **Hamburger SV** – 2016–
- Flemming Povlsen – 1. FC Köln, Borussia Dortmund – 1987–95
- David Rasmussen – Hansa Rostock – 2004–05
- Morten Rasmussen – Mainz 05 – 2010–11
- Ole Rasmussen – Hertha BSC – 1975–80, 1982–83
- Peter Rasmussen – VfB Stuttgart – 1989–91
- Thomas Rasmussen – Hansa Rostock – 2003–05
- Henrik Ravn – Fortuna Düsseldorf – 1986–87
- Henrik Risom – Dynamo Dresden – 1993–95
- Mads Roerslev – VfL Wolfsburg – 2024–26
- **Frederik Rønnow** – Eintracht Frankfurt, Schalke 04, **Union Berlin** – 2018–
- Per Røntved – Werder Bremen – 1972–79
- Thomas Rytter – VfL Wolfsburg – 2001–05
- Ebbe Sand – Schalke 04 – 1999–2006
- Michael Schjønberg – 1. FC Kaiserslautern – 1997–2001
- Kjell Seneca – Bayern Munich – 1975–77
- Zidan Sertdemir – Bayer Leverkusen – 2021–22
- Allan Simonsen – Borussia M'gladbach – 1972–79
- Morten Skoubo – Borussia M'gladbach – 2002–04
- **Robert Skov** – TSG Hoffenheim, **Union Berlin** – 2019–
- Andreas Skov Olsen – VfL Wolfsburg – 2024–26
- Peter Skov-Jensen – VfL Bochum – 2004–05, 2006–07
- Dennis Sørensen – Energie Cottbus – 2007–09
- Frederik Sørensen – 1. FC Köln – 2015–18, 2020–21
- Ole Sørensen – 1. FC Köln – 1965–66
- **Jens Stage** – **Werder Bremen** – 2022–
- Jens Steffensen – Bayer Uerdingen, Arminia Bielefeld – 1979–82
- Mark Strudal – Borussia Dortmund – 1988–89
- Kevin Stuhr Ellegaard – Hertha BSC – 2006–07
- Sebastian Svärd – Borussia M'gladbach – 2006–07, 2008–09
- Bo Svensson – Borussia M'gladbach, Mainz 05 – 2005–07, 2009–14
- Claus Thomsen – VfL Wolfsburg – 1998–2001
- Steen Thychosen – Borussia M'gladbach – 1978–81
- Mikkel Thygesen – Borussia M'gladbach – 2006–07
- Poul-Erik Thygesen – Werder Bremen – 1973–75
- Stig Tøfting – Hamburger SV, MSV Duisburg – 1993–95, 1997–2002
- Jon Dahl Tomasson – VfB Stuttgart – 2005–07
- Jonas Troest – Hannover 96 – 2005–07
- Niels Tune-Hansen – FC St. Pauli – 1977–78
- **Mads Valentin** – **FC Augsburg** – 2019–
- Jannik Vestergaard – TSG Hoffenheim, Werder Bremen, Borussia M'gladbach – 2010–18
- Jonas Wind – VfL Wolfsburg – 2021–26
- Frederik Winther – FC Augsburg – 2021–23
- Niki Zimling – Mainz 05 – 2012–14

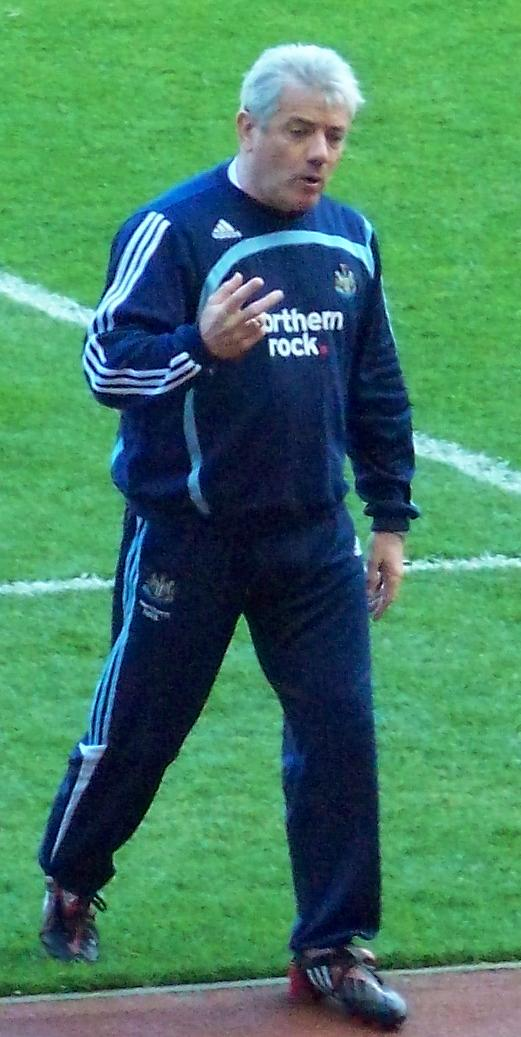
Kevin Keegan was awarded European Footballer of the Year in 1978 and 1979.

=== England ===
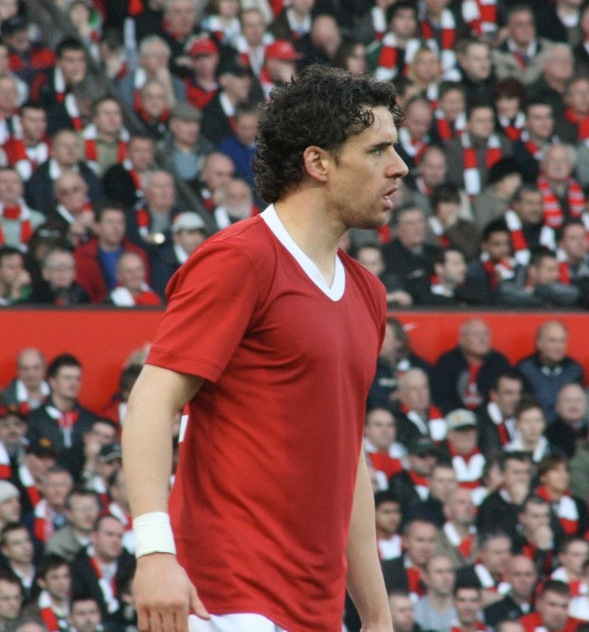
Owen Hargreaves

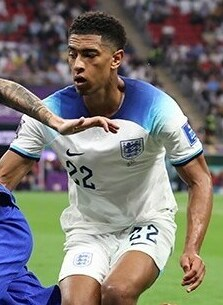
Jude Bellingham in Borussia Dortmund

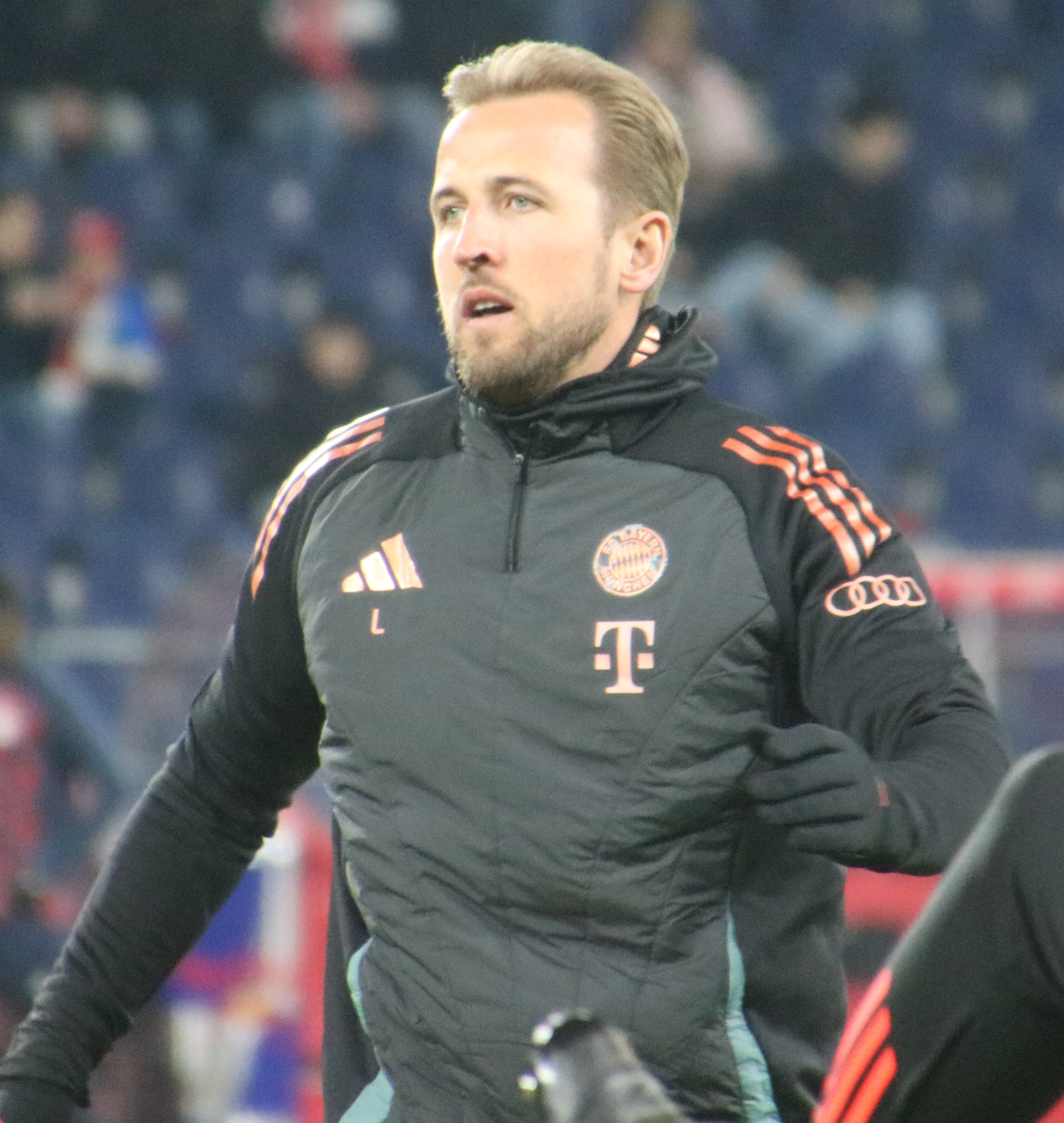
Harry Kane

- Oladapo Afolayan – FC St. Pauli – 2024–26
- Lewis Baker – Fortuna Düsseldorf – 2019–20
- **Jobe Bellingham** – **Borussia Dortmund** – 2025–
- Jude Bellingham – Borussia Dortmund – 2020–23
- Keanan Bennetts – Borussia M'gladbach – 2019–20, 2021–22
- Lee Buchanan – Werder Bremen – 2022–23
- Eric Dier – Bayern Munich – 2023–25
- Mandela Egbo – Borussia M'gladbach – 2017–18
- Antony Evans – SC Paderborn – 2019–20
- Mark Farrington – Hertha BSC – 1990–91
- Jamie Gittens – Borussia Dortmund – 2021–25
- Owen Hargreaves – Bayern Munich – 2000–07
- **Reigan Heskey** – **1. FC Köln** – 2026–
- Kaylen Hinds — VfL Wolfsburg — 2017–18
- Peter Hobday – Hannover 96, Eintracht Frankfurt, Arminia Bielefeld – 1987–90, 1996–97
- Callum Hudson-Odoi – Bayer Leverkusen – 2022–23
- **Harry Kane** – **Bayern Munich** – 2023–
- Kevin Keegan – Hamburger SV – 1977–80
- Jonjoe Kenny – Schalke 04, Hertha BSC – 2019–20, 2022–23
- Ryan Kent – SC Freiburg – 2017–18
- Clinton Mola – VfB Stuttgart – 2020–23
- **Mikey Moore** – **1. FC Köln** – 2026–
- Reiss Nelson – TSG Hoffenheim – 2018–19
- **Ethan Nwaneri** – **Borussia Dortmund** – 2026–
- Reece Oxford – Borussia M'gladbach, FC Augsburg – 2017–23
- Jordi Osei-Tutu – VfL Bochum – 2022–23
- **Jarell Quansah** – **Bayer Leverkusen** – 2025–
- Omar Richards – Bayern Munich – 2021–22
- Jadon Sancho – Borussia Dortmund – 2017–21, 2023–24
- Ryan Sessegnon – TSG Hoffenheim – 2020–21
- **Jahmai Simpson-Pusey** – **1. FC Köln** – 2025–
- Emile Smith Rowe – RB Leipzig – 2018–19
- Dave Watson – Werder Bremen – 1979–80
- Tony Woodcock – 1. FC Köln – 1979–82, 1986–88

=== Estonia ===
- **Karl Jakob Hein** – **Werder Bremen** – 2025–
- Ragnar Klavan – FC Augsburg – 2012–16
- Karol Mets – FC St. Pauli – 2024–26

=== Faroe Islands ===
- Jóan Símun Edmundsson – Arminia Bielefeld – 2020–21

=== Finland ===
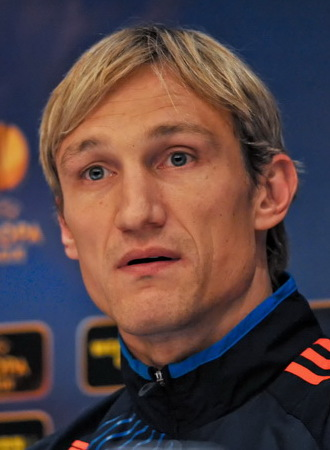
Sami Hyypiä

- Mikael Forssell – Borussia M'gladbach, Hannover 96 – 2002–03, 2008–11
- Ari Hjelm – Stuttgarter Kickers – 1988–89
- **L**ukáš Hrádecký – Eintracht Frankfurt, Bayer Leverkusen – 2015–25
- Sami Hyypiä – Bayer Leverkusen – 2009–11
- Olli Isoaho – Arminia Bielefeld – 1982–83
- **Fredrik Jensen** – **FC Augsburg** – 2018–
- Joonas Kolkka – Borussia M'gladbach – 2003–04
- Pekka Lagerblom – Werder Bremen, 1. FC Nürnberg – 2003–06
- Kari Laukkanen – Stuttgarter Kickers – 1988–89
- Jari Litmanen – Hansa Rostock – 2004–05
- Niklas Moisander – Werder Bremen – 2016–21
- Mika Nurmela – 1. FC Kaiserslautern – 2003–05
- Petri Pasanen – Werder Bremen – 2004–11
- Juhani Peltonen – Hamburger SV – 1964–66
- Joel Pohjanpalo – Bayer Leverkusen, Union Berlin – 2016–18, 2019–23
- Teemu Pukki – Schalke 04 – 2011–14
- Seppo Pyykkö – Bayer Uerdingen – 1980–81
- Jukka Raitala – TSG Hoffenheim – 2009–10
- Pasi Rautiainen – Bayern Munich, Werder Bremen, Arminia Bielefeld – 1980–85
- Alexander Ring – Borussia M'gladbach – 2011–13
- **Otto Ruoppi** – **Mainz 05** – 2026–
- Janne Saarinen – 1860 Munich – 2003–04
- Berat Sadik – Arminia Bielefeld – 2008–09
- Jere Uronen – Schalke 04 – 2022–23

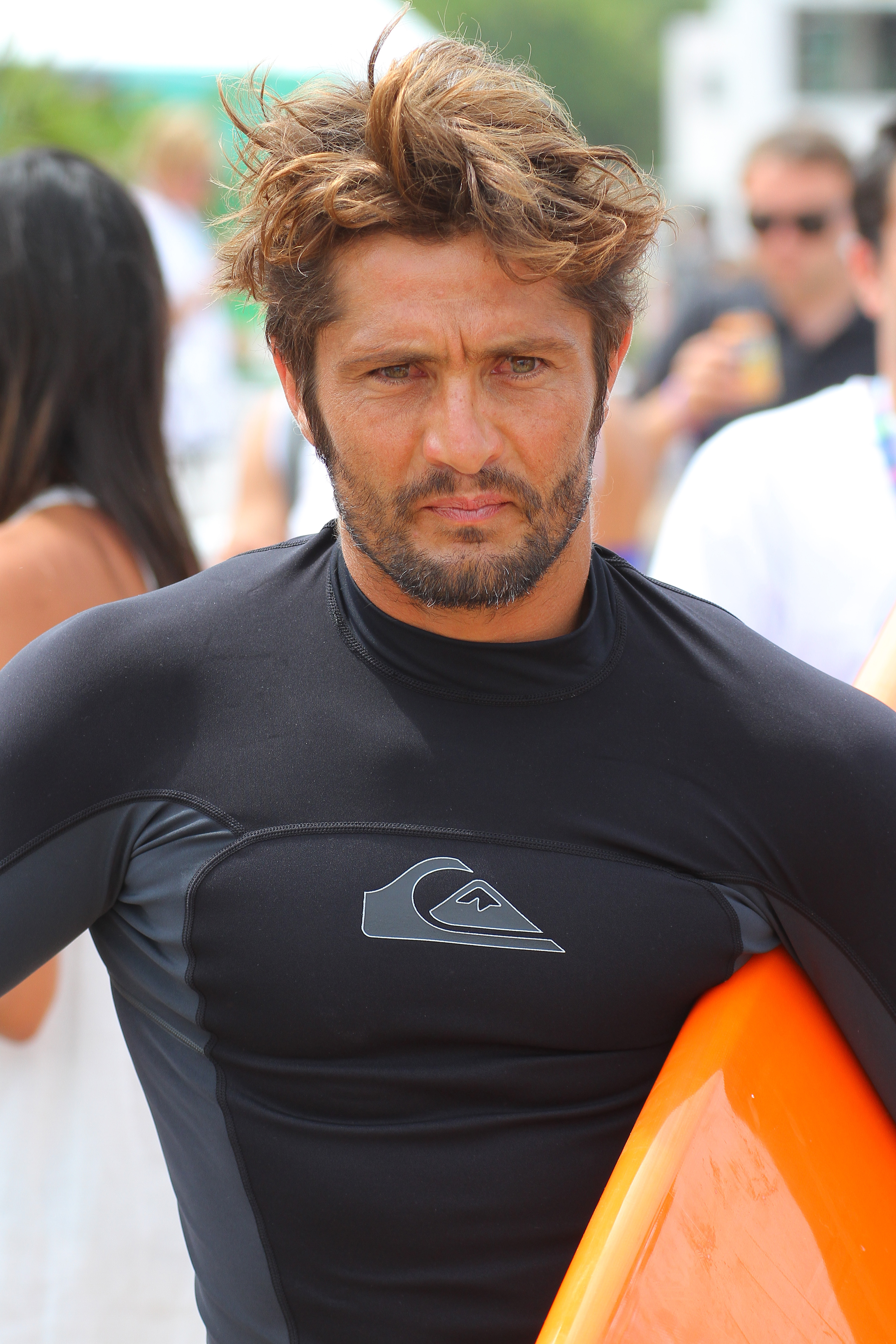
Left back Bixente Lizarazu, 1998 FIFA World Cup winner

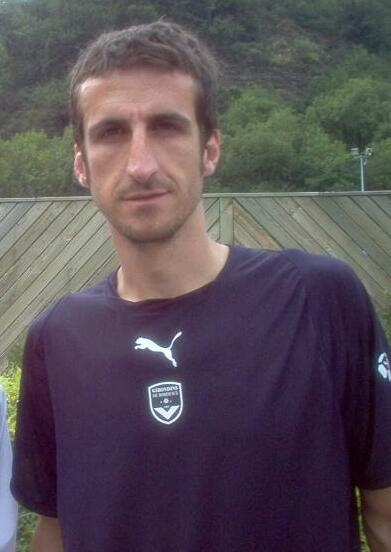
Playmaker Johan Micoud was a pivotal figure in Werder Bremen's 2000s success, culminating in winning the double of German championship and DFB-Pokal in 2003–04.

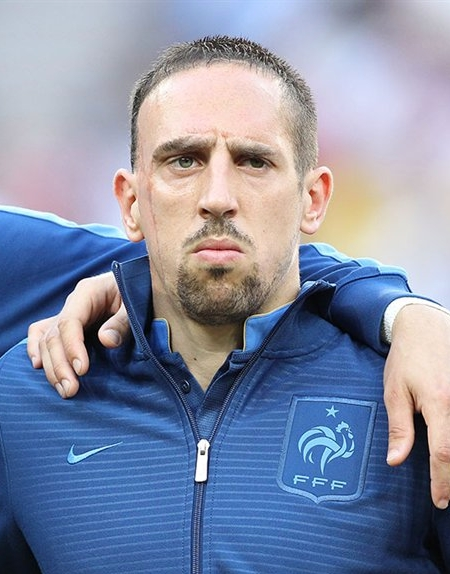
Franck Ribéry was awarded Footballer of the Year (Germany) in 2008 and European Footballer of the Year in 2013.

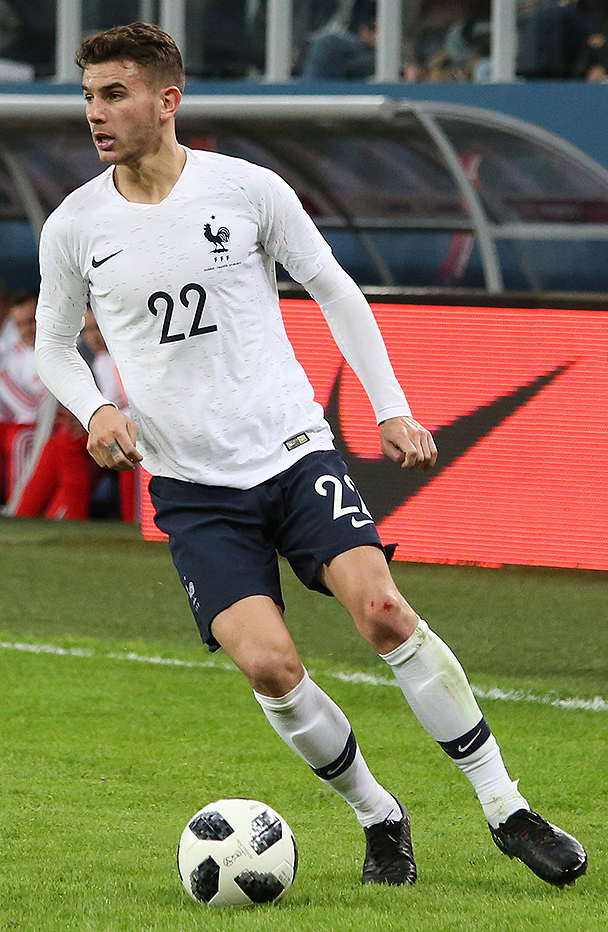
2018 FIFA World Cup winner Lucas Hernandez moved to Bayern Munich in the most expensive incoming transfer in Bundesliga history.

=== France ===
- Jacques Abardonado – 1. FC Nürnberg – 2007–08
- **Martin Adeline** – **Hamburger SV** – 2026–
- Naouirou Ahamada – VfB Stuttgart – 2020–23
- Ludovic Ajorque – Mainz 05 – 2022–24
- **Skelly Alvero** – **Werder Bremen** – 2023–
- **Lorenz Assignon** – **VfB Stuttgart** – 2025–
- Johan Audel – VfB Stuttgart – 2010–11
- Jean-Kévin Augustin – RB Leipzig – 2017–19
- **Loïc Badé** – **Bayer Leverkusen** – 2024–
- **Jean-Mattéo Bahoya** – **Eintracht Frankfurt** – 2023–
- Christian Bassila – Energie Cottbus – 2007–08
- Mathieu Béda – 1. FC Kaiserslautern – 2005–06
- **Jeanuël Belocian** – **Bayer Leverkusen**, VfL Wolfsburg – 2024–
- Marc Berdoll – 1. FC Saarbrücken – 1976–77
- **El Chadaille Bitshiabu** – **RB Leipzig** – 2023–
- **Sacha Boey** – **Bayern Munich** – 2023–
- **Lilian Brassier** – **Eintracht Frankfurt** – 2026–
- Romain Brégerie – FC Ingolstadt – 2015–17
- Jimmy Briand – Hannover 96 – 2014–15
- Gaëtan Bussmann – Mainz 05 – 2015–17, 2018–19
- **Anthony Caci** – **Mainz 05** – 2022–
- Irvin Cardona – FC Augsburg – 2022–24
- Kingsley Coman – Bayern Munich – 2015–25
- Francis Coquelin – SC Freiburg – 2013–14
- Soumaïla Coulibaly – Borussia Dortmund – 2022–23
- Tanguy Coulibaly – VfB Stuttgart – 2020–23
- Nicolas Cozza – VfL Wolfsburg – 2022–24
- Michaël Cuisance – Borussia M'gladbach, Bayern Munich – 2017–22
- Matthieu Delpierre – VfB Stuttgart, TSG Hoffenheim – 2004–13
- Ousmane Dembélé – Borussia Dortmund – 2016–17
- Moussa Diaby – Bayer Leverkusen – 2019–23
- Salim Djefaflia – Hannover 96 – 2003–04
- Youri Djorkaeff – 1. FC Kaiserslautern – 1999–2002
- **Jean-Luc Dompé** – **Hamburger SV** – 2025–
- Régis Dorn – SC Freiburg, Hansa Rostock – 2000–02, 2004–05, 2007–08
- Mamadou Doucouré – Borussia M'gladbach – 2019–20
- Fabrice Ehret – 1. FC Köln – 2008–11
- Hugo Ekitike – Eintracht Frankfurt – 2023–25
- **Maxime Estève** – **RB Leipzig** – 2026–
- Hubert Fournier – Borussia M'gladbach – 1996–98
- **Joane Gadou** – **Borussia Dortmund** – 2026–
- **Valentin Gendrey** – **TSG Hoffenheim** – 2024–
- **Tidiam Gomis** – **RB Leipzig** – 2024–
- Gilbert Gress – VfB Stuttgart – 1966–71
- Mattéo Guendouzi – Hertha BSC – 2020–21
- Josuha Guilavogui – VfL Wolfsburg, Mainz 05 – 2014–24
- Patrick Guillou – VfL Bochum – 1990–93
- Gérard Hausser – Karlsruher SC – 1967–68
- Lucas Hernandez – Bayern Munich – 2019–23
- **Franck Honorat** – **Borussia M'gladbach** – 2023–
- Valérien Ismaël – Werder Bremen, Bayern Munich, Hannover 96 – 2003–09
- Jonathan Jäger – SC Freiburg – 2009–11
- Jean-Sébastien Jaurès – Borussia M'gladbach – 2008–10
- Christopher Jullien – SC Freiburg – 2014–15
- **Arnaud Kalimuendo** – **Eintracht Frankfurt** – 2025–
- Mamoudou Karamoko – VfL Wolfsburg – 2019–20
- Marc Keller – Karlsruher SC – 1996–98
- **Samba Konaté** – **RB Leipzig** – 2025–
- **Abdoul Koné** – **RB Leipzig** – 2026–
- Saël Kumbedi – VfL Wolfsburg – 2025–26
- Randal Kolo Muani – Eintracht Frankfurt – 2022–24
- Timothée Kolodziejczak – Borussia M'gladbach, Schalke 04 – 2016–17, 2022–23
- Ibrahima Konaté – RB Leipzig – 2017–21
- Kouadio Koné – Borussia M'gladbach – 2021–24
- Jean-François Kornetzky – Karlsruher SC – 2007–09
- Vincent Koziello – 1. FC Köln – 2017–18
- Gaëtan Krebs – Hannover 96 – 2007–09
- Maxence Lacroix – VfL Wolfsburg – 2020–24
- Charles-Elie Laprevotte – SC Freiburg – 2013–14
- Lilian Laslandes – 1. FC Köln – 2001–02
- Bryan Lasme – Arminia Bielefeld – 2021–22
- **Florian Le Joncour** – **SV Elversberg** – 2026–
- Damien Le Tallec – Borussia Dortmund – 2009–10
- Bixente Lizarazu – Bayern Munich – 1997–2006
- Anthony Losilla – VfL Bochum – 2021–25
- **Castello Lukeba** – **RB Leipzig** – 2023–
- **Han-Noah Massengo** – **FC Augsburg** – 2025–
- Steve Marlet – VfL Wolfsburg – 2005–06
- Jean-Philippe Mateta – Mainz 05 – 2018–21
- **Chrislain Matsima** – **FC Augsburg** – 2024–
- Johan Micoud – Werder Bremen – 2002–06
- **William Mikelbrencis** – **Hamburger SV** – 2025–
- Enzo Millot – VfB Stuttgart – 2021–25
- Anthony Modeste – TSG Hoffenheim, 1. FC Köln, Borussia Dortmund – 2013–17, 2019–23
- **David Mokwa** – TSG Hoffenheim, **SV Elversberg** – 2024–
- Florent Mollet – Schalke 04 – 2022–23
- Nordi Mukiele – RB Leipzig, Bayer Leverkusen – 2018–22, 2024–25
- **Nathan Ngoumou** – **Borussia M'gladbach** – 2022–
- Tanguy Nianzou – Bayern Munich – 2020–22
- **Niels Nkounkou** – **Eintracht Frankfurt** – 2023–
- **Christopher Nkunku** – **RB Leipzig** – 2019–23, 2026–
- **Arnaud Nordin** – **Mainz 05** – 2024–
- **Stanley Nsoki** – TSG Hoffenheim, **Union Berlin** – 2022–
- **Michael Olise** – **Bayern Munich** – 2024–
- Jean-Pierre Papin – Bayern Munich – 1994–96
- Benjamin Pavard – VfB Stuttgart, Bayern Munich – 2017–23
- **William Mikelbrencis** – **Hamburger SV** – 2025–
- Marc Pfertzel – VfL Bochum – 2007–10
- Ronaël Pierre-Gabriel – Mainz 05 – 2019–20
- Alassane Pléa – Borussia M'gladbach – 2018–25
- Nicolas Plestan – Schalke 04 – 2010–11
- Simon Pouplin – SC Freiburg – 2009–11
- Abder Ramdane – Hansa Rostock, SC Freiburg – 1998–2002
- Yoric Ravet – SC Freiburg – 2017–19
- Franck Ribéry – Bayern Munich – 2007–19
- **Anthony Rouault** – **VfB Stuttgart** – 2023–
- Georginio Rutter – TSG Hoffenheim – 2020–23
- Willy Sagnol – Bayern Munich – 2000–08
- Allan Saint-Maximin – Hannover 96 – 2015–16
- Baptiste Santamaria – SC Freiburg – 2020–22
- Jonathan Schmid – SC Freiburg, TSG Hoffenheim, FC Augsburg – 2010–23
- **Kiliann Sildillia** – **SC Freiburg** – 2021–
- Mikaël Silvestre – Werder Bremen – 2010–12
- Mohamed Simakan – RB Leipzig – 2021–25
- Didier Six – VfB Stuttgart – 1981–83
- **Aboubaka Soumahoro** – **Hamburger SV** – 2025–
- Benjamin Stambouli – Schalke 04 – 2016–21
- **Axel Tape** – **Bayer Leverkusen** – 2025–
- **Mathys Tel** – **Bayern Munich** – 2022–
- **Martin Terrier** – **Bayer Leverkusen** – 2024–
- Marcus Thuram – Borussia M'gladbach – 2019–23
- Alexis Tibidi – VfB Stuttgart – 2021–22
- Jean-Clair Todibo – Schalke 04 – 2019–20
- Corentin Tolisso – Bayern Munich – 2017–22
- Lucas Tousart – Hertha BSC, Union Berlin – 2020–25
- **Dayot Upamecano** – RB Leipzig, **Bayern Munich** – 2016–
- Olivier Veigneau – MSV Duisburg – 2007–08
- Guillaume Warmuz – Borussia Dortmund – 2003–05
- **Dan-Axel Zagadou** – Borussia Dortmund, **VfB Stuttgart** – 2017–
- David Zitelli – Karlsruher SC – 1997–98

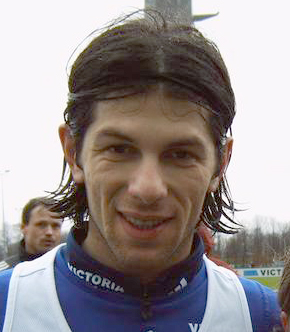
Levan Kobiashvili is the fifth-most capped foreign player in Bundesliga history with 351 appearances (as of 2026).

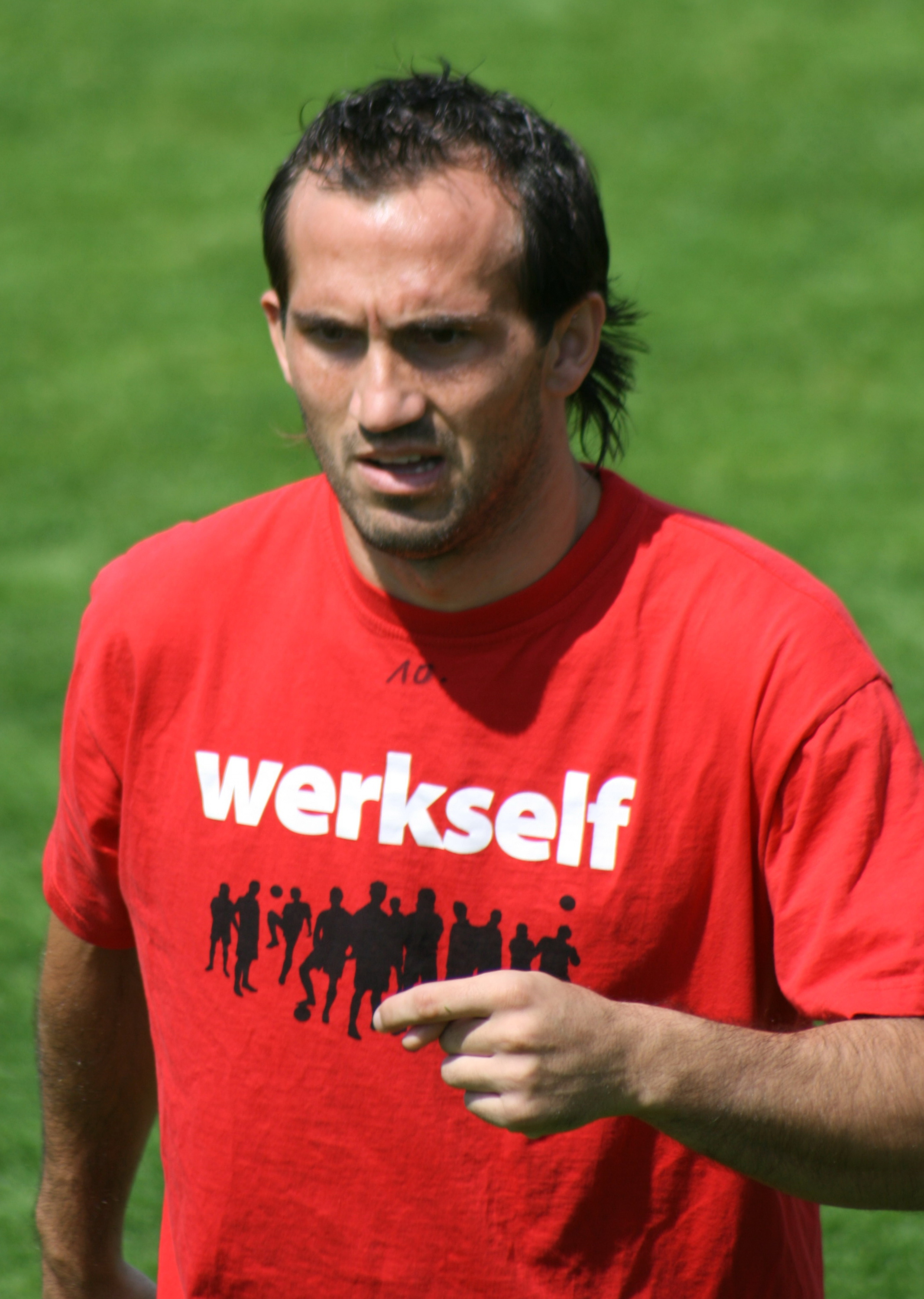
Theofanis Gekas, top goalscorer in 06–07

=== Georgia ===
- Archil Arveladze – 1. FC Köln – 2000–02
- Revaz Arveladze – 1. FC Köln – 1993–94
- **Giorgi Gocholeishvili** – **Hamburger SV** – 2025–
- Aleksandr Iashvili – SC Freiburg, Karlsruher SC – 1998–2002, 2003–05, 2007–09
- Levan Kenia – Schalke 04 – 2008–10
- Otar Khizaneishvili – SC Freiburg – 2004–05
- Levan Kobiashvili – SC Freiburg, Schalke 04, Hertha BSC – 1998–2002, 2003–10, 2011–12, 2013–14
- **Luka Lochoshvili** – **1. FC Köln** – 2026–
- David Targamadze – SC Freiburg – 2009–10
- Kakhaber Tskhadadze – Eintracht Frankfurt – 1992–96
- Levan Tskitishvili – SC Freiburg, VfL Wolfsburg – 1998–2002, 2003–06
- Budu Zivzivadze – 1. FC Heidenheim – 2024–26

=== Greece ===
- Ioannis Amanatidis – VfB Stuttgart, Eintracht Frankfurt, 1. FC Kaiserslautern – 2002–11
- Chrissovalantis Anagnostou – Borussia M'gladbach – 1997–99
- Angelos Charisteas – Werder Bremen, 1. FC Nürnberg, Bayer Leverkusen, Schalke 04 – 2002–05, 2007–11
- Dimitrios Daras – Werder Bremen – 1975–78
- Anastasios Donis – VfB Stuttgart – 2017–19
- Kostas Fortounis – 1. FC Kaiserslautern – 2011–12
- Maik Galakos – Fortuna Düsseldorf – 1972–73
- Theofanis Gekas – VfL Bochum, Bayer Leverkusen, Hertha BSC, Eintracht Frankfurt – 2006–11
- **Dimitris Giannoulis** – **FC Augsburg** – 2024–
- Dimitrios Grammozis – Hamburger SV, 1. FC Kaiserslautern, 1. FC Köln – 1998–2006
- Minas Hantzidis – Bayer Leverkusen, VfL Bochum – 1985–88
- Leonidas Kampantais – Arminia Bielefeld – 2007–08
- Stefanos Kapino – Mainz 05, Werder Bremen – 2014–15, 2018–20
- **Konstantinos Karetsas** – **Borussia Dortmund** – 2026–
- Efthimios Kompodietas – Arminia Bielefeld – 1983–84
- **Giannis Konstantelias** – **Borussia Dortmund** – 2026–
- Kostas Konstantinidis – Hertha BSC, Hannover 96 – 1999–2004
- Konstantinos Koulierakis – VfL Wolfsburg – 2024–26
- Sotirios Kyrgiakos – Eintracht Frankfurt, VfL Wolfsburg – 2006–08, 2011–13
- Vasilios Lampropoulos – VfL Bochum – 2021–23
- Nikos Liberopoulos – Eintracht Frankfurt – 2008–10
- Dimitrios Limnios – 1. FC Köln – 2020–21, 2022–23
- Stelios Malezas – Fortuna Düsseldorf – 2012–13
- Vangelis Mantzios – Eintracht Frankfurt – 2007–08
- Georgios Masouras – VfL Bochum – 2024–25
- Konstantinos Mavropanos – VfB Stuttgart – 2020–23
- Dimitrios Moutas – Stuttgarter Kickers, VfL Bochum – 1991–93
- Fotios Papadopoulos – VfL Bochum – 1973–74
- Kyriakos Papadopoulos – Schalke 04, Bayer Leverkusen, RB Leipzig, Hamburger SV – 2010–18
- Sokratis Papastathopoulos – Werder Bremen, Borussia Dortmund – 2011–18
- Vasilios Pavlidis – Schalke 04 – 2020–21
- Athanasios Petsos – Bayer Leverkusen, 1. FC Kaiserslautern, Greuther Fürth, Werder Bremen – 2009–13, 2016–17
- Vasileios Pliatsikas – Schalke 04 – 2009–11
- Panagiotis Retsos – Bayer Leverkusen – 2017–18, 2019–20, 2021–22
- Manolis Saliakas – FC St. Pauli – 2024–26
- Paschalis Seretis – SC Freiburg – 1993–97
- Kostas Stafylidis – Bayer Leverkusen, FC Augsburg, TSG Hoffenheim, VfL Bochum – 2013–14, 2015–20, 2021–23
- Dimitrios Tsionanis – Waldhof Mannheim – 1983–90
- Pantelis Tsionanis – Waldhof Mannheim – 1983–84
- Georgios Tzavellas – Eintracht Frankfurt – 2010–11
- Alexandros Tziolis – Werder Bremen – 2008–09
- Sebastian Vasiliadis – SC Paderborn – 2019–20
- Odisseas Vlachodimos – VfB Stuttgart – 2015–16
- Panagiotis Vlachodimos – FC Augsburg – 2013–14

=== Hungary ===
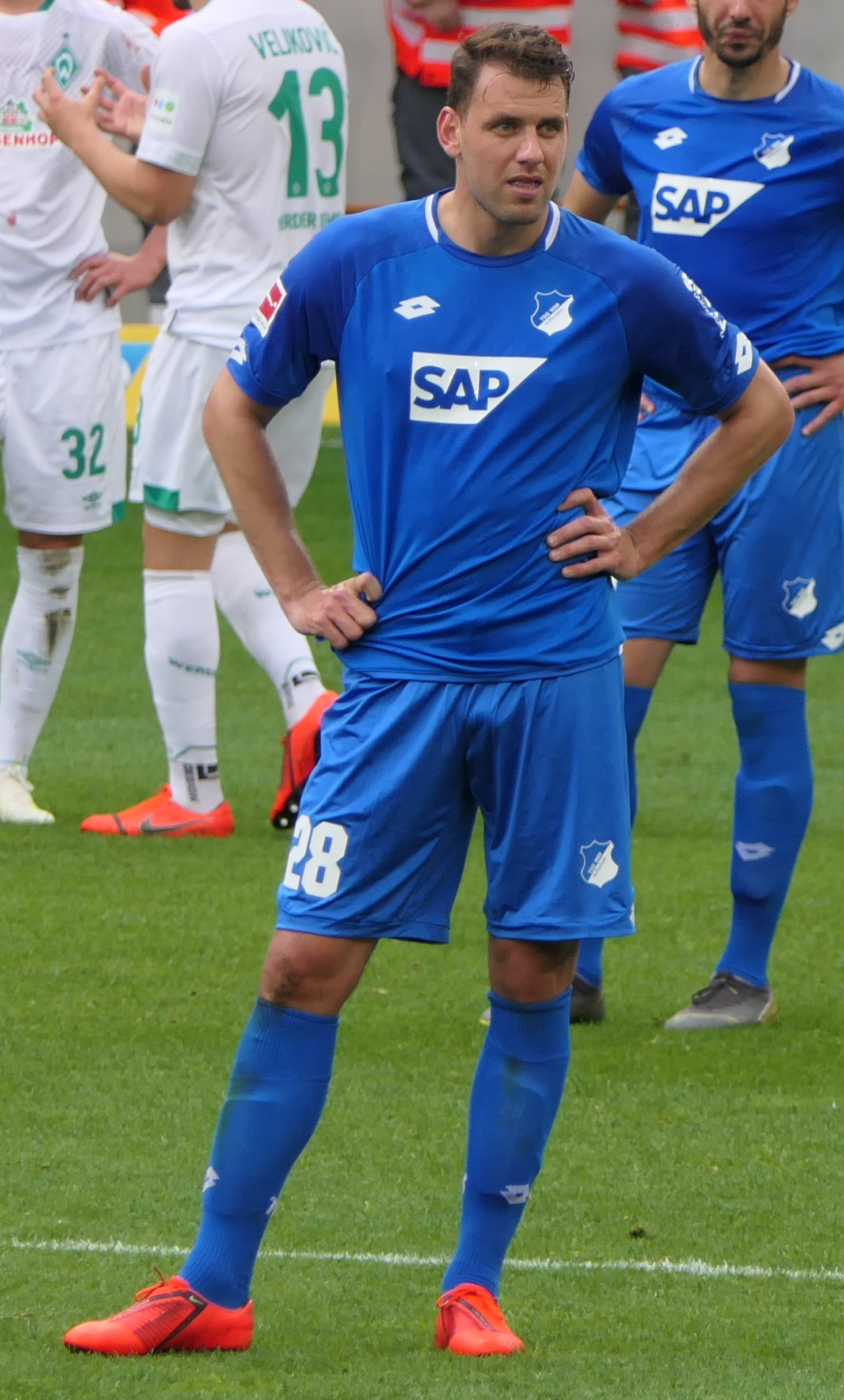
Ádám Szalai

- Bálint Bajner – Borussia Dortmund – 2012–13
- Tamás Bódog – SSV Ulm, Mainz 05 – 1999–2000, 2004–06
- Márton Dárdai – Hertha BSC – 2020–23
- Pál Dárdai – Hertha BSC – 1997–2010
- Palkó Dárdai – Hertha BSC – 2017–19
- Lajos Détári – Eintracht Frankfurt – 1987–88
- Tibor Dombi – Eintracht Frankfurt – 1999–2000
- László Farkasházy – VfL Bochum – 1989–90
- Péter Gulácsi – RB Leipzig – 2016–26
- Tamás Hajnal – Schalke 04, Karlsruher SC, Borussia Dortmund, VfB Stuttgart – 1999–2000, 2007–13
- Ferenc Horváth – Energie Cottbus – 2000–01
- János Hrutka – 1. FC Kaiserslautern – 1997–2000
- Szabolcs Huszti – Hannover 96, Eintracht Frankfurt – 2006–09, 2012–14, 2015–17
- Gábor Király – Hertha BSC – 1997–2004
- László Kleinheisler – Werder Bremen, Darmstadt 98 – 2015–17
- György Kottán – Bayer Uerdingen – 1975–76
- Tamás Krivitz – Wuppertaler SV – 1974–75
- Krisztián Lisztes – VfB Stuttgart, Werder Bremen, Borussia M'gladbach – 1996–2006
- Zsolt Lőw – Energie Cottbus, TSG Hoffenheim, Mainz 05 – 2002–03, 2008–10
- János Mátyus – Energie Cottbus – 2000–02
- Vasile Miriuță – Energie Cottbus – 2000–03
- Antal Nagy – Wuppertaler SV – 1974–75
- Soma Novothny – VfL Bochum – 2021–22
- **Willi Orbán** – **RB Leipzig** – 2016–
- István Pisont – Eintracht Frankfurt – 1998–99
- Roland Sallai – SC Freiburg – 2018–25
- **András Schäfer** – **Union Berlin** – 2021–
- Vilmos Sebők – Energie Cottbus – 2000–03
- Zoltán Stieber – Mainz 05, Greuther Fürth, Hamburger SV – 2011–13, 2014–16
- Imre Szabics – VfB Stuttgart, 1. FC Köln, Mainz 05 – 2003–07
- Ádám Szalai – Mainz 05, Schalke 04, TSG Hoffenheim, Hannover 96 – 2009–22
- Attila Szalai – TSG Hoffenheim, SC Freiburg – 2023–25
- Zoltán Szélesi – Energie Cottbus – 2006–08
- Dominik Szoboszlai – RB Leipzig – 2021–23
- Krisztián Szollár – Schalke 04 – 1999–2000
- István Sztáni – Eintracht Frankfurt – 1965–68
- Lajos Szűcs – 1. FC Kaiserslautern – 1997–98
- Attila Tököli – 1. FC Köln – 2005–06
- József Török – Waldhof Mannheim – 1985–87
- Gyula Tóth – Schalke 04, 1. FC Nürnberg – 1964–68
- József Varga – Greuther Fürth – 2012–13
- Zoltán Varga – Hertha BSC – 1970–72
- Ottó Vincze – Energie Cottbus – 2001–02

=== Iceland ===
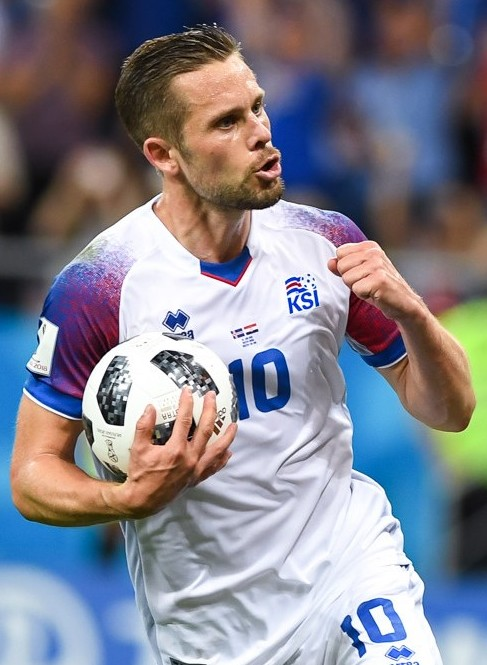
Gylfi Sigurðsson

- Magnús Bergs – Borussia Dortmund, Eintracht Braunschweig – 1980–81, 1984–85
- Atli Edvaldsson – Borussia Dortmund, Fortuna Düsseldorf, Bayer Uerdingen – 1980–88
- Alfreð Finnbogason – FC Augsburg – 2015–22
- Samúel Kári Friðjónsson – SC Paderborn – 2019–20
- Bjarni Guðjónsson – VfL Bochum – 2003–04
- Thordur Gudjonsson – VfL Bochum – 1994–95, 1996–97, 2002–05
- Larus Gudmundsson – Bayer Uerdingen, 1. FC Kaiserslautern – 1984–88
- **Ísak Bergmann Jóhannesson** – **1. FC Köln** – 2025–
- Pétur Ormslev – Fortuna Düsseldorf – 1981–84
- Gylfi Sigurðsson – TSG Hoffenheim – 2010–12
- Helgi Sigurðsson – VfB Stuttgart – 1994–95
- Ásgeir Sigurvinsson – Bayern Munich, VfB Stuttgart – 1981–90
- Eyjólfur Sverrisson – VfB Stuttgart, Hertha BSC – 1989–94, 1997–2003
- Gunnar Thorvaldsson – Hannover 96 – 2006–07

=== Israel ===
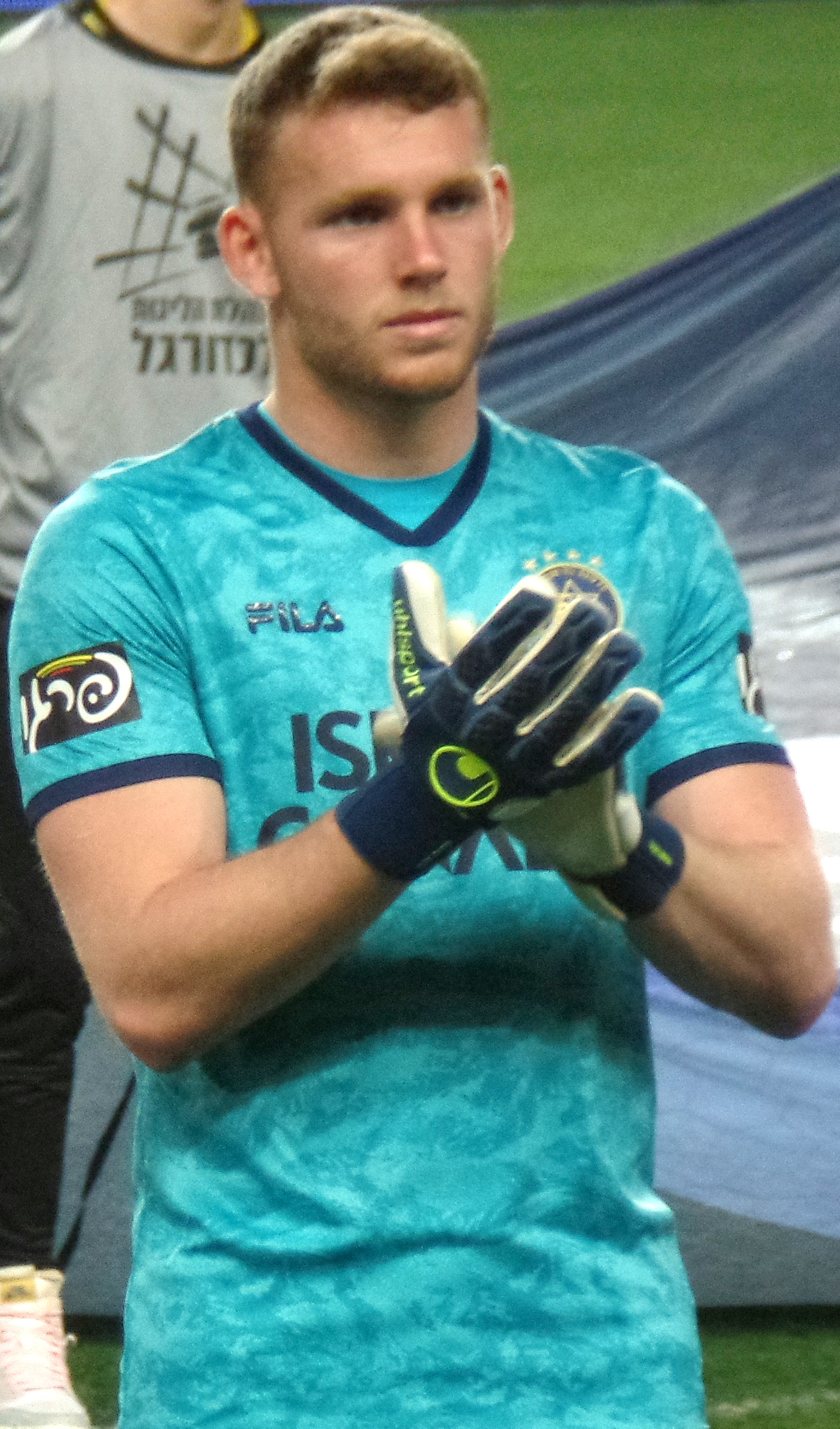
Daniel Peretz has played four Bundesliga matches for Bayern Munich

- Gal Alberman – Borussia M'gladbach – 2008–09
- Asaf Arania – Darmstadt – 2023–24
- Almog Cohen – 1. FC Nürnberg, FC Ingolstadt – 2010–13, 2015–17
- Roberto Colautti – Borussia M'gladbach – 2008–10
- Mu'nas Dabbur – TSG Hoffenheim – 2019–23
- Ilay Elmkies – TSG Hoffenheim – 2019–20
- Daniel Peretz – Bayern Munich – 2023–25
- David Pizanti – 1. FC Köln – 1985–87
- Shmuel Rosenthal – Borussia M'gladbach – 1972–73
- Itay Shechter – 1. FC Kaiserslautern – 2011–12
- Taleb Tawatha – Eintracht Frankfurt – 2016–19
- Gil Vermouth – 1. FC Kaiserslautern – 2011–12

=== Italy ===
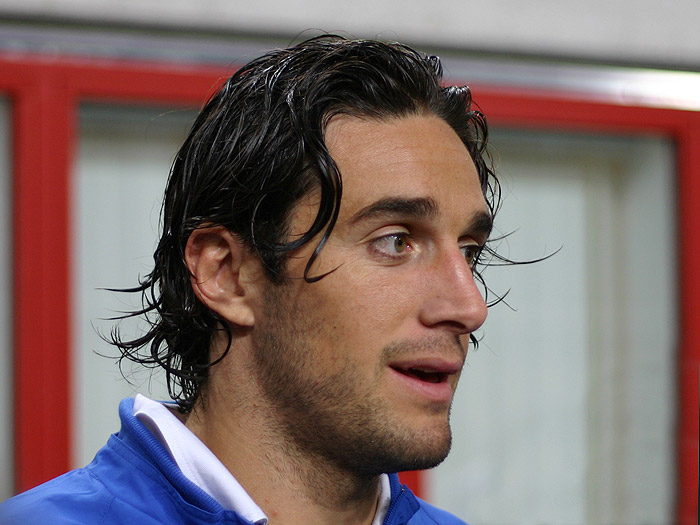
Luca Toni, top goalscorer in 07–08

- Federico Barba – VfB Stuttgart – 2015–16
- Andrea Barzagli – VfL Wolfsburg – 2008–11
- Leonardo Bonucci – Union Berlin – 2023–24
- Luca Caldirola – Werder Bremen, Darmstadt 98 – 2013–18
- **Daniel Caligiuri** – SC Freiburg, VfL Wolfsburg, Schalke 04, **FC Augsburg** – 2009–
- Mauro Camoranesi – VfB Stuttgart – 2010–11
- Giuseppe Catizone – VfB Stuttgart – 1999–2000
- **Fabio Chiarodia** – Werder Bremen, **Borussia M'gladbach** – 2022–
- Giulio Donati – Bayer Leverkusen, Mainz 05 – 2013–19
- **Vincenzo Grifo** – TSG Hoffenheim, **SC Freiburg**, Borussia M'Gladbach – 2012–13, 2016–
- Ciro Immobile – Borussia Dortmund – 2014–15
- **Samuele Inácio** – **Borussia Dortmund** – 2025–
- Federico Macheda – VfB Stuttgart – 2012–13
- Mattia Maggio – Hamburger SV – 2013–14
- **Filippo Mane** – **Borussia Dortmund** – 2025–
- Cristian Molinaro – VfB Stuttgart – 2009–14
- Massimo Oddo – Bayern Munich – 2008–09
- Luca Pellegrini – Eintracht Frankfurt – 2022–23
- **Luca Reggiani** – **Borussia Dortmund** – 2025–
- Ruggiero Rizzitelli – Bayern Munich – 1996–98
- Jacopo Sala – Hamburger SV – 2011–13
- Raffael Tonello – Fortuna Düsseldorf – 1995–97
- Luca Toni – Bayern Munich – 2007–10
- Luciano Velardi – VfL Bochum – 2002–03
- Kelvin Yeboah – FC Augsburg – 2022–23
- Cristian Zaccardo – VfL Wolfsburg – 2008–10

=== Kazakhstan ===
- Konstantin Engel – FC Ingolstadt – 2015–16
- Sergei Karimov – VfL Wolfsburg – 2007–09
- Peter Neustädter – Karlsruher SC – 1992–94
- Heinrich Schmidtgal – Greuther Fürth – 2012–13

=== Kosovo ===
Until 1992 part of SFR Yugoslavia, from 1992 to 2003 part of FR Yugoslavia, from 2003 to 2006 part of Serbia and Montenegro, from 2006 to 2008/2016 part of Serbia

- Fisnik Asllani – TSG Hoffenheim – 2021–23
- Donis Avdijaj – Schalke 04 – 2016–18
- **Leon Avdullahu** – **TSG Hoffenheim** – 2025–
- Ilir Azemi – Greuther Fürth – 2012–13
- Besart Berisha – Hamburger SV – 2006–07
- Valon Berisha – Fortuna Düsseldorf – 2019–20
- Albert Bunjaku – 1. FC Nürnberg – 2009–12
- Arianit Ferati – VfB Stuttgart – 2015–16
- Florent Hadergjonaj – FC Ingolstadt – 2016–17
- **Albian Hajdari** – **TSG Hoffenheim** – 2025–
- Blendi Idrizi – Schalke 04 – 2020–21
- Fahrudin Jusufi – Eintracht Frankfurt – 1966–70
- Alban Meha – SC Paderborn – 2014–15
- **Florent Muslija** – Hannover 96, **SC Freiburg** – 2018–19, 2023–
- **Erblin Osmani** – **Bayern Munich** – 2026–
- Leart Paqarada – 1. FC Köln, 1. FC Heidenheim – 2023–24, 2025–36
- Fanol Përdedaj – Hertha BSC – 2011–12
- Milot Rashica – Werder Bremen – 2017–21
- **Elvis Rexhbeçaj** – VfL Wolfsburg, 1. FC Köln, VfL Bochum, **FC Augsburg** – 2017–
- **Emir Sahiti** – **Hamburger SV** – 2025–
- Valmir Sulejmani – Hannover 96 – 2013–14, 2015–16
- Faton Toski – Eintracht Frankfurt – 2006–09

=== Latvia ===
- Artjoms Rudņevs – Hamburger SV, Hannover 96, 1. FC Köln – 2012–17

=== Liechtenstein ===
- Sandro Wieser – TSG Hoffenheim – 2011–12

=== Lithuania ===
- Valdas Ivanauskas – Hamburger SV – 1993–97
- Marius Stankevičius – Hannover 96 – 2014–15
- Gintaras Staučė – MSV Duisburg – 1997–2000

=== Luxembourg ===
- Leandro Barreiro – Mainz 05 – 2018–24
- Yvandro Borges Sanches – Borussia M'gladbach – 2022–24
- **Aiman Dardari** – **FC Augsburg** – 2025–
- Nico Braun – Schalke 04 – 1971–73
- Manuel Cardoni – Bayer Leverkusen – 1996–97
- Laurent Jans – SC Paderborn – 2019–20
- Robby Langers – Borussia M'gladbach – 1980–82
- Mathias Olesen – 1. FC Köln – 2021–24
- **Tiago Pereira Cardoso** – **Borussia M'gladbach** – 2024–
- Danel Sinani – FC St. Pauli – 2024–26
- Jeff Strasser – 1. FC Kaiserslautern, Borussia M'gladbach – 1999–2006

=== Malta ===
- Irvin Cardona – FC Augsburg – 2022–24
- Michael Mifsud – 1. FC Kaiserslautern – 2001–03

=== Moldova ===
- Alexandru Curtianu – Hamburger SV – 1998–99
- Alexandru Popovici – MSV Duisburg – 1997–98

=== Montenegro ===
Until 1992 part of SFR Yugoslavia, from 1992 to 2003 part of FR Yugoslavia, from 2003 to 2006 part of Serbia and Montenegro

- Dragan Bogavac – Mainz 05 – 2009–10
- Đorđije Ćetković – Hansa Rostock – 2007–08
- Radomir Đalović – Arminia Bielefeld – 2004–06
- Zdravko Drinčić – VfL Bochum – 1998–99, 2000–01
- Vanja Grubač – Hamburger SV – 1998–2000
- Stevan Jovetić – Hertha BSC – 2021–23
- Sanibal Orahovac – Karlsruher SC – 2007–08
- Savo Pavićević – Energie Cottbus – 2008–09
- Zvezdan Pejović – Fortuna Düsseldorf – 1995–96
- Milorad Peković – Mainz 05, Greuther Fürth – 2005–07, 2009–10, 2012–13
- Mirnes Pepić – SC Paderborn – 2014–15
- Branko Rašović – Borussia Dortmund – 1969–72

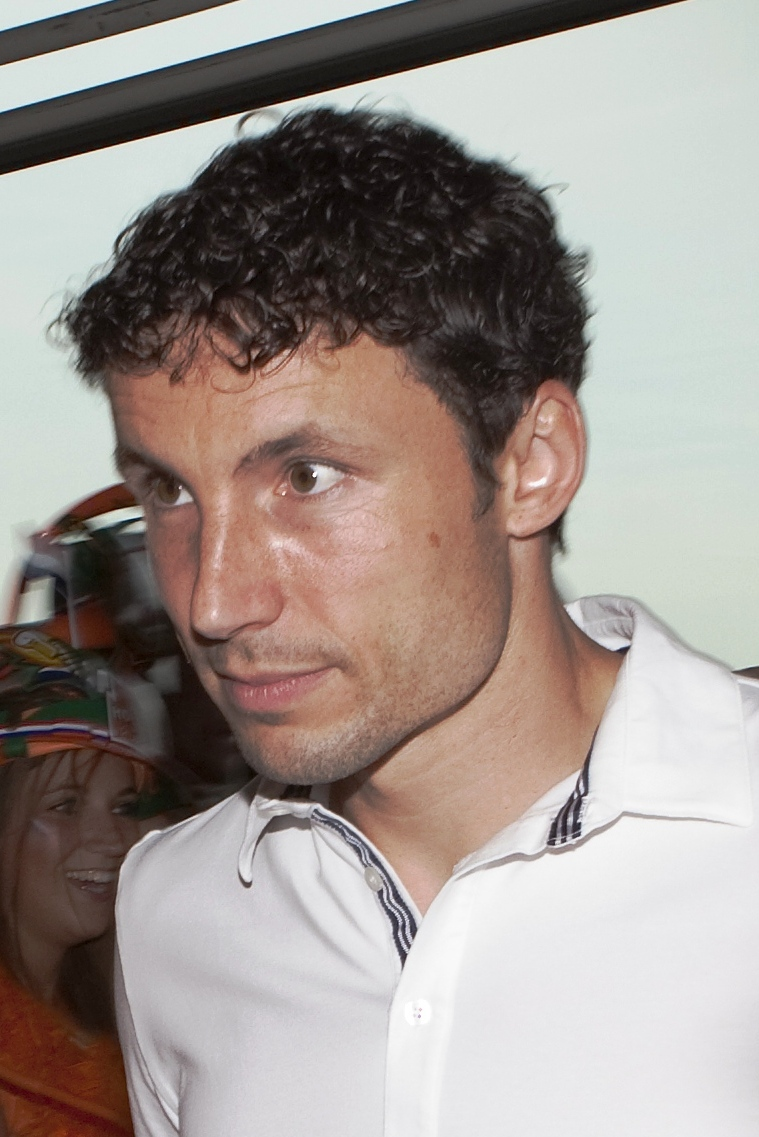
From 2008 to 2011, Mark van Bommel was the first and thus far only foreign captain of Bayern Munich.

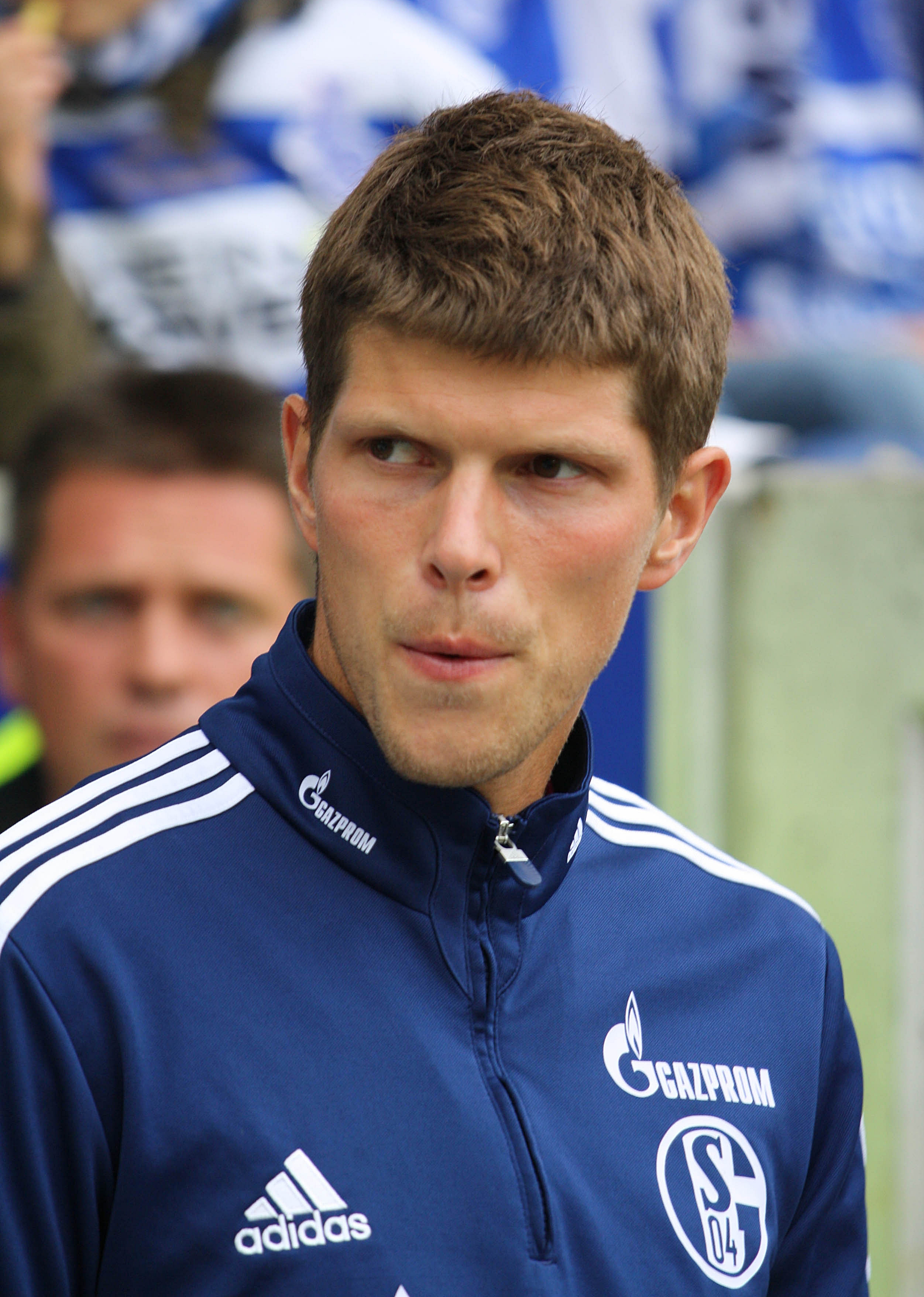
Klaas-Jan Huntelaar, top goalscorer in 11–12

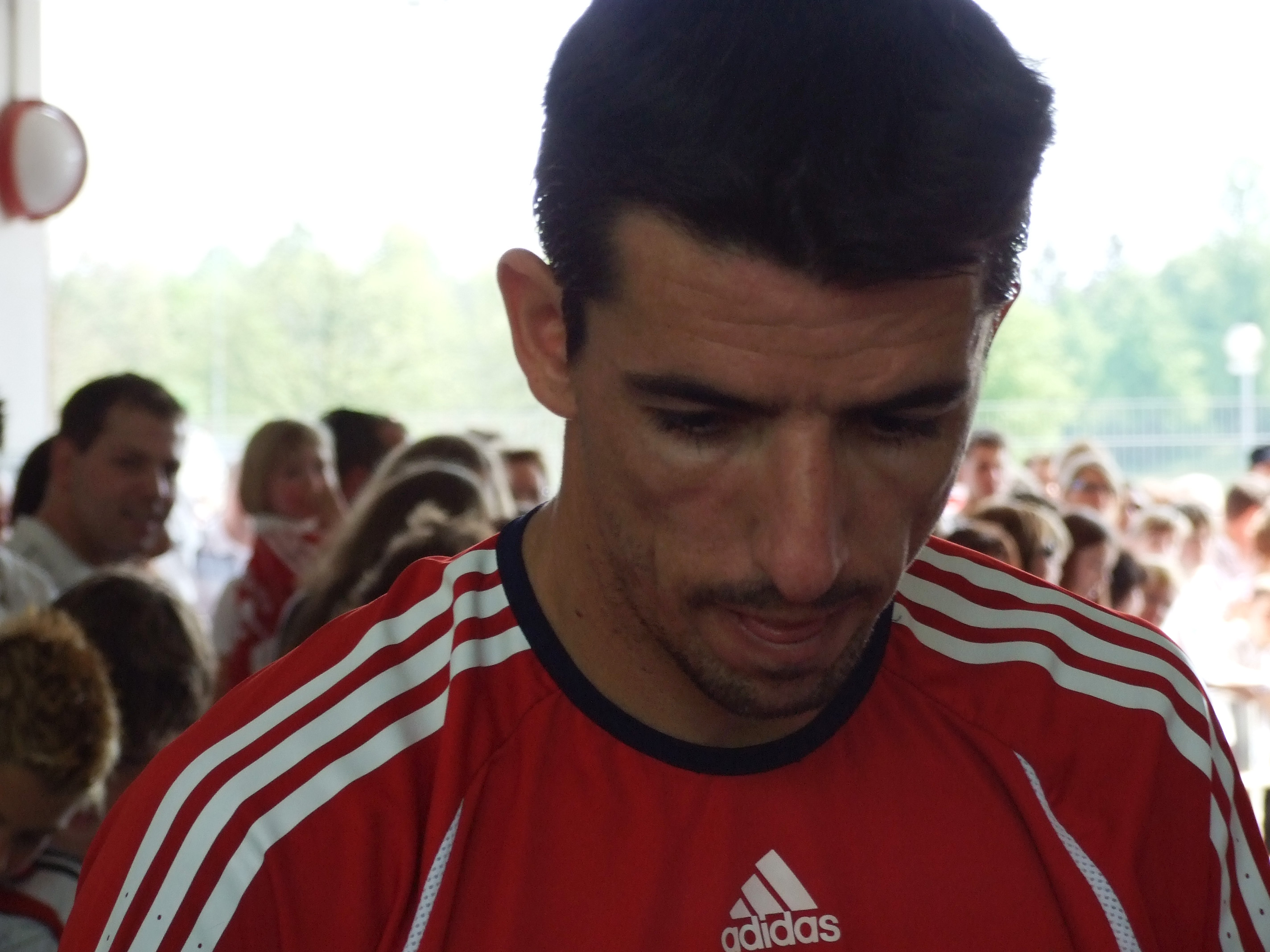
From 2003 to 2007, Roy Makaay was the leading goalscorer of Bayern Munich.

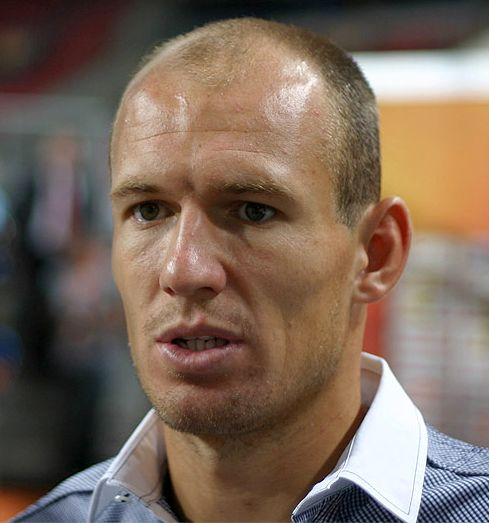
Arjen Robben was awarded Footballer of the Year (Germany) in 2010.

=== Netherlands ===
(Note: Alphabetical ordering follows Dutch customs)

- Ibrahim Afellay – Schalke 04 – 2012–13
- Berthil ter Avest – Borussia M'gladbach – 2001–02
- Ryan Babel – TSG Hoffenheim – 2010–12
- Mitchel Bakker – Bayer Leverkusen – 2021–23
- **Ezechiel Banzuzi** – **RB Leipzig** – 2025–
- Roy Beerens – Hertha BSC – 2014–16
- Charlison Benschop – Hannover 96 – 2015–16, 2017–18
- **Rav van den Berg** – **1. FC Köln** – 2025–
- Sepp van den Berg – Schalke 04, Mainz 05 – 2022–24
- Daley Blind – Bayern Munich – 2022–23
- Myron Boadu – VfL Bochum – 2024–25
- Melayro Bogarde – TSG Hoffenheim – 2019–21
- Mark van Bommel – Bayern Munich – 2006–11
- Solomon Bonnah – RB Leipzig – 2021–22
- Peter Bosz – Hansa Rostock – 1997–98
- Khalid Boulahrouz – Hamburger SV, VfB Stuttgart – 2004–06, 2008–12
- Edson Braafheid – Bayern Munich, TSG Hoffenheim – 2009–12
- Kees Bregman – MSV Duisburg, Arminia Bielefeld – 1974–79, 1980–82
- Joshua Brenet – TSG Hoffenheim – 2018–19, 2020–22
- Brian Brobbey – RB Leipzig – 2021–22
- Roel Brouwers – Borussia M'gladbach – 2008–16
- Arnold Bruggink – Hannover 96 – 2006–10
- Jeffrey Bruma – Hamburger SV, VfL Wolfsburg, Schalke 04, Mainz 05 – 2011–13, 2016–20
- **Wouter Burger** – **TSG Hoffenheim** – 2025–
- Delano Burgzorg – Mainz 05 – 2021–23
- Dick van Burik – Hertha BSC – 1997–2007
- Ellery Cairo – SC Freiburg, Hertha BSC – 2003–05, 2005–07
- Luc Castaignos – Eintracht Frankfurt – 2015–16
- Romeo Castelen – Hamburger SV – 2007–08, 2009–10, 2011–12
- **Thijs Dallinga** – **1. FC Köln** – 2026–
- Lorenzo Davids – FC Augsburg – 2011–12
- Jonathan de Guzmán – Eintracht Frankfurt – 2017–20
- Harry Decheiver – SC Freiburg, Borussia Dortmund – 1995–97, 1997–98
- Javairô Dilrosun – Hertha BSC – 2018–22
- Danilho Doekhi – Union Berlin – 2022–26
- Bas Dost – VfL Wolfsburg, Eintracht Frankfurt – 2012–17, 2019–21
- Rick van Drongelen – Hamburger SV – 2017–18
- Rein van Duijnhoven – VfL Bochum – 2000–01, 2002–05
- René van Eck – 1. FC Nürnberg – 1998–99
- René Eijkelkamp – Schalke 04 – 1997–99
- Jurgen Ekkelenkamp – Hertha BSC – 2021–22
- Sepp van den Berg – Schalke 04, Mainz 05 – 2022–24
- Anwar El Ghazi – Mainz 05 – 2023–24
- Eljero Elia – Hamburger SV, Werder Bremen – 2009–15
- Orlando Engelaar – Schalke 04 – 2008–09
- Mark Flekken – SC Freiburg – 2018–23
- Timothy Fosu-Mensah – Bayer Leverkusen – 2020–23
- Jeremie Frimpong – Bayer Leverkusen – 2020–25
- **Lutsharel Geertruida** – **RB Leipzig** – 2024–
- Dennis Gentenaar – Borussia Dortmund – 2005–06
- Ryan Gravenberch – Bayern Munich – 2022–24
- **Jeffrey Gouweleeuw** – **FC Augsburg** – 2015–
- Cedric van der Gun – Borussia Dortmund – 2005–06
- Hans van de Haar – SSV Ulm – 1999–2000
- Heinz van Haaren – Meidericher SV, Schalke 04 – 1964–68, 1968–72
- John Heitinga – Hertha BSC – 2014–15
- **Ramon Hendriks** – **VfB Stuttgart** – 2024–
- Delano Hill – Hansa Rostock – 2001–05
- Marc van Hintum – Hannover 96 – 2002–03
- Kevin Hofland – VfL Wolfsburg – 2004–07
- Marco van Hoogdalem – Schalke 04 – 1996–2003
- Rick Hoogendorp – VfL Wolfsburg – 2005–07
- Justin Hoogma – TSG Hoffenheim, Greuther Fürth – 2018–19, 2021–22
- Nico-Jan Hoogma – Hamburger SV – 1998–2004
- Mike van der Hoorn – Arminia Bielefeld – 2020–22
- Max Huiberts – Borussia M'gladbach – 1995–97
- Klaas-Jan Huntelaar – Schalke 04 – 2010–17, 2020–21
- Ola John – Hamburger SV – 2013–14
- Martin Jol – Bayern Munich – 1978–79
- Luuk de Jong – Borussia M'gladbach – 2012–14
- Nigel de Jong – Hamburger SV, Mainz 05 – 2005–09, 2017–18
- Martijn Kaars – FC St. Pauli – 2025–26
- Davy Klaassen – Werder Bremen – 2018–20
- Justin Kluivert – RB Leipzig – 2020–21
- Johan de Kock – Schalke 04 – 1996–2000
- Samuel Koejoe – SC Freiburg – 2004–05
- Erwin Koen – Alemannia Aachen – 2006–07
- Michel van de Korput – 1. FC Köln – 1985–86
- Michael Lamey – MSV Duisburg, Arminia Bielefeld – 2007–08, 2008–09
- Sam Lammers – Eintracht Frankfurt – 2021–22
- Quido Lanzaat – Borussia M'gladbach – 2001–02
- Tommie van der Leegte – VfL Wolfsburg – 2005–07
- Jeffrey Leiwakabessy – Alemannia Aachen – 2006–07
- Arie van Lent – Werder Bremen, Borussia M'gladbach, Eintracht Frankfurt – 1991–93, 1995–98, 2001–04, 2005–06
- Matthijs de Ligt – Bayern Munich – 2022–24
- Willi Lippens – Rot-Weiss Essen, Borussia Dortmund – 1966–67, 1969–71, 1973–79
- Jürgen Locadia – TSG Hoffenheim, VfL Bochum – 2019–20, 2021–22
- Jos Luhukay – KFC Uerdingen – 1995–96
- Anthony Lurling – 1. FC Köln – 2005–06
- Rob Maas – Arminia Bielefeld, Hertha BSC – 1996–98, 1998–99, 2000–03
- Ian Maatsen – Borussia Dortmund – 2023–24
- Roy Makaay – Bayern Munich – 2003–07
- Donyell Malen – Borussia Dortmund – 2021–25
- Joris Mathijsen – Hamburger SV – 2006–11
- Marcel Meeuwis – Borussia M'gladbach – 2009–11
- Erik Meijer – KFC Uerdingen, Bayer Leverkusen, Hamburger SV – 1995–96, 1996–99, 2000–03
- Virgil Misidjan – 1. FC Nürnberg – 2018–19
- Egbert-Jan ter Mors – Rot-Weiss Essen – 1969–71
- Youri Mulder – Schalke 04 – 1993–2002
- Alfred Nijhuis – MSV Duisburg, Borussia Dortmund – 1991–92, 1993–95, 1996–97, 1998–2001
- Angelo Nijskens – Bayer Uerdingen – 1988–89
- Ruud van Nistelrooy – Hamburger SV – 2009–11
- Niels Oude Kamphuis – Schalke 04, Borussia M'gladbach – 1999–2006
- Thomas Ouwejan – Schalke 04 – 2022–23
- Patrick Paauwe – Borussia M'gladbach – 2008–09
- Gerrit Plomp – VfL Bochum – 1989–90
- **Ernest Poku** – **Bayer Leverkusen** – 2025–
- Jacobus Prins – 1. FC Kaiserslautern – 1963–65
- Daishawn Redan – Hertha BSC – 2019–22
- **Youri Regeer** – **Werder Bremen** – 2026–
- Rob Reekers – VfL Bochum – 1986–93, 1994–95
- Karim Rekik – Hertha BSC – 2017–20
- Arjen Robben – Bayern Munich – 2009–19
- Lodewijk Roembiak – Werder Bremen – 1998–2000
- **Mats Rots** – **TSG Hoffenheim** – 2026–
- Bryan Roy – Hertha BSC – 1997–2001
- Mohamed Sankoh – VfB Stuttgart – 2020–22
- Bernard Schuiteman – Bayer Leverkusen – 1993–95
- Jenson Seelt – VfL Wolfsburg – 2025–26
- Gerald Sibon – 1. FC Nürnberg – 2006–07
- Sonny Silooy – Arminia Bielefeld – 1996–98
- Xavi Simons – RB Leipzig – 2023–26
- Daley Sinkgraven – Bayer Leverkusen – 2019–23
- Jerry St. Juste – Mainz 05 – 2019–22
- Roberto Straal – Arminia Bielefeld – 1999–2000
- Wim Suurbier – Schalke 04 – 1977–78
- Guus Til – SC Freiburg – 2020–21
- Rafael van der Vaart – Hamburger SV – 2005–08, 2012–15
- Donny van de Beek – Eintracht Frankfurt – 2023–24
- Micky van de Ven – VfL Wolfsburg – 2021–23
- Gerald Vanenburg – 1860 Munich – 1998–2000
- **Joey Veerman** – **Borussia Dortmund** – 2026–
- Paul Verhaegh – FC Augsburg, VfL Wolfsburg – 2011–19
- Frank Verlaat – VfB Stuttgart, Werder Bremen – 1995–99, 2000–03
- Vincent Vermeij – SC Freiburg – 2021–22
- Heinz Versteeg – Meidericher SV – 1963–66
- Nick Viergever – Greuther Fürth – 2021–22
- Michel Vlap – Arminia Bielefeld – 2020–21
- Harry de Vlugt – Rot-Weiss Essen – 1973–75
- Anton Vriesde – VfL Bochum – 2002–04
- Stephanus Walbeek – Hertha BSC – 1975–76
- Thijs Waterink – Arminia Bielefeld – 1999–2000
- Wout Weghorst – VfL Wolfsburg, TSG Hoffenheim – 2018–22, 2023–24
- Erik Willaarts – Borussia M'gladbach – 1987–89
- Jetro Willems – Eintracht Frankfurt, Greuther Fürth – 2017–19, 2021–22
- Dani de Wit – VfL Bochum – 2024–25
- Jan Wouters – Bayern Munich – 1991–94
- Deyovaisio Zeefuik – Hertha BSC – 2020–22
- Joshua Zirkzee – Bayern Munich – 2019–21
- Kees Zwamborn – MSV Duisburg – 1981–82

=== North Macedonia ===
Until 1991 part of SFR Yugoslavia, from 1991 to 2019 named Republic of Macedonia

- Vančo Balevski – Karlsruher SC – 1976–77
- Darko Churlinov – 1. FC Köln, VfB Stuttgart – 2019–21, 2022–23
- Saša Ćirić – 1. FC Nürnberg, Eintracht Frankfurt – 1998–99, 2000–01, 2002–03
- **Eljif Elmas** – **RB Leipzig** – 2023–
- Elvis Hajradinović – 1. FC Kaiserslautern – 1991–92
- Ferhan Hasani – VfL Wolfsburg – 2012–13
- Besart Ibraimi – Schalke 04 – 2009–10
- Goran Markov – Hansa Rostock – 1995–96
- Toni Micevski – Hansa Rostock, Energie Cottbus – 1995–98, 2000–01
- Igor Mitreski – Energie Cottbus – 2006–09
- Valmir Nafiu – Hamburger SV – 2014–15
- Oka Nikolov – Eintracht Frankfurt – 1995–96, 1998–2001, 2003–04, 2005–11, 2012–13
- Nikolče Noveski – Hansa Rostock, Mainz 05 – 1998–99, 2004–07, 2009–15
- Darko Pančev – VfB Leipzig, Fortuna Düsseldorf – 1993–94, 1995–96
- Metodije Spasovski – 1. FC Saarbrücken – 1976–77
- Mitko Stojkovski – VfB Stuttgart – 1997–99
- Borislav Tomovski – Hansa Rostock – 1997–98
- Vančo Trajanov – Arminia Bielefeld – 2004–05
- Aleksandar Vasoski – Eintracht Frankfurt – 2005–11

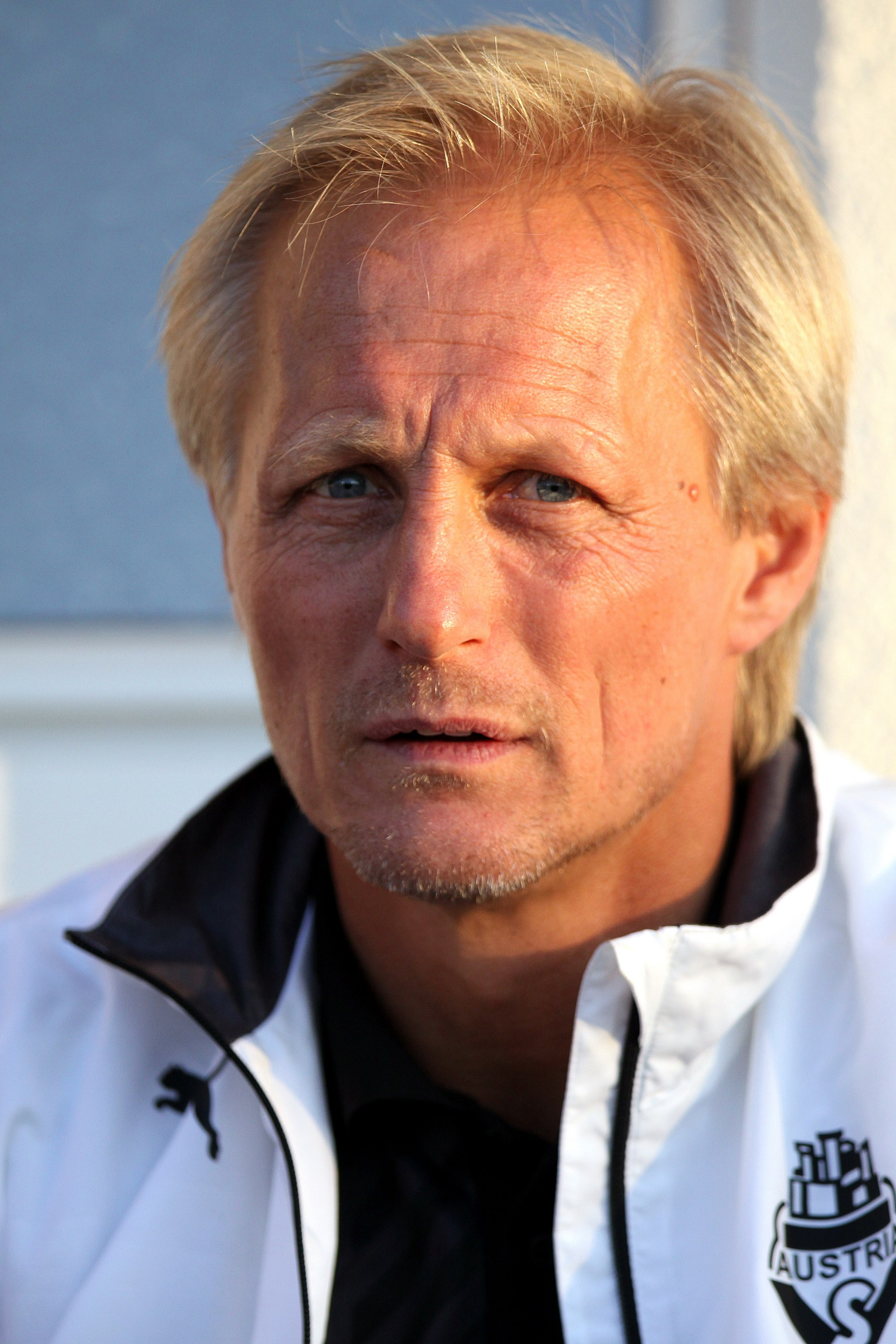
Jørn Andersen was the first ever foreign Bundesliga top goalscorer (18 goals in 1989–90).

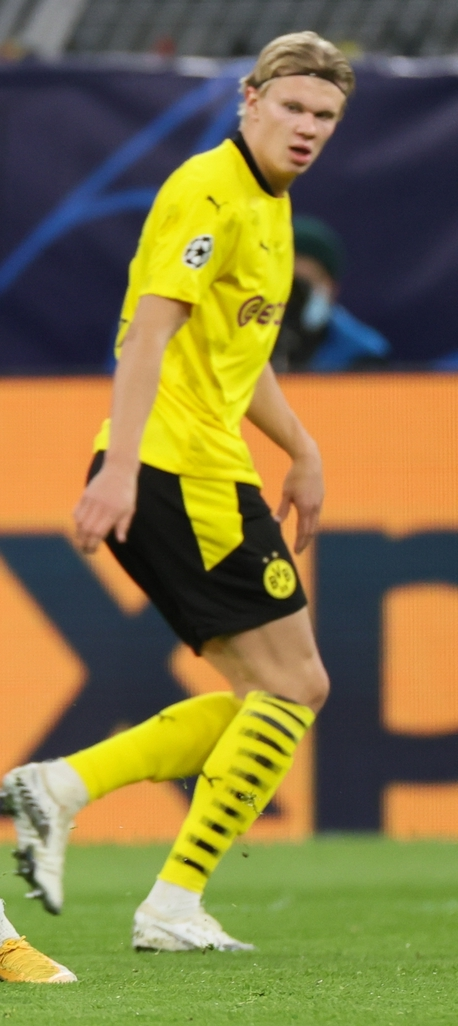
Erling Haaland scored 62 goals in 67 Bundesliga games while playing for Borussia Dortmund.

=== Norway ===
- Jan-Einar Aas – Bayern Munich – 1979–81
- Mohammed Abdellaoue – Hannover 96, VfB Stuttgart – 2010–14
- Per Egil Ahlsen – Fortuna Düsseldorf – 1990–91
- Jørn Andersen – 1. FC Nürnberg, Eintracht Frankfurt, Fortuna Düsseldorf, Hamburger SV, Dynamo Dresden – 1985–95
- André Bergdølmo – Borussia Dortmund – 2003–05
- Tommy Berntsen – Eintracht Frankfurt – 2000–01
- Morten Berre – FC St. Pauli – 2001–02
- Fredrik André Bjørkan – Hertha BSC – 2021–22
- Rune Bratseth – Werder Bremen – 1986–95
- Geirmund Brendesæter – Arminia Bielefeld – 1996–97
- Mats Møller Dæhli – SC Freiburg – 2014–15, 2016–17
- Vadim Demidov – Eintracht Frankfurt – 2012–13
- Hassan El Fakiri – Borussia M'gladbach – 2005–07
- Omar Elabdellaoui – Eintracht Braunschweig – 2013–14
- Tarik Elyounoussi – TSG Hoffenheim – 2013–16
- Bård Finne – 1. FC Köln – 2014–15
- Jan Åge Fjørtoft – Eintracht Frankfurt – 1998–2001
- Havard Flo – Werder Bremen – 1996–99
- Iver Fossum – Hannover 96 – 2015–16, 2017–19
- Thomas Gill – MSV Duisburg – 1996–99
- Anders Giske – 1. FC Nürnberg, Bayer Leverkusen, 1. FC Köln – 1983–92
- Frode Grodås – Schalke 04 – 1998–99, 2000–01
- Erling Haaland – Borussia Dortmund – 2019–22
- Jan Halvor Halvorsen – Hertha BSC – 1990–91
- **Andreas Hanche-Olsen** – **Mainz 05** – 2022–
- Torjus Hansén – Arminia Bielefeld – 2002–03
- Isak Hansen-Aarøen – Werder Bremen – 2023–24, 2025–26
- Jens Petter Hauge – Eintracht Frankfurt – 2021–22, 2023–24
- Henning Hauger – Hannover 96 – 2011–12
- Vegar Eggen Hedenstad – SC Freiburg – 2012–13
- Kai Erik Herlovsen – Borussia M'gladbach – 1982–89
- Jon Inge Høiland – 1. FC Kaiserslautern – 2005–06
- Jahn Ivar Jakobsen – MSV Duisburg – 1993–94
- Rune Jarstein – Hertha BSC – 2013–21
- Erland Johnsen – Bayern Munich – 1988–90
- Joshua King – Borussia M'gladbach – 2011–12
- Magnus Knudsen – Holstein Kiel – 2024–25
- Tommy Larsen – 1. FC Nürnberg – 2001–03, 2004–05
- Trond Fredrik Ludvigsen – Hertha BSC – 2001–02
- Mikail Maden – Schalke 04 – 2020–21
- Erik Mykland – 1860 Munich – 2000–02
- Håvard Nielsen – Eintracht Braunschweig, SC Freiburg, Greuther Fürth – 2013–14, 2016–17, 2021–22
- Roger Nilsen – 1. FC Köln – 1992–93
- **Jonathan Norbye** – **RB Leipzig** – 2023–
- Håvard Nordtveit – 1. FC Nürnberg, Borussia M'gladbach, TSG Hoffenheim – 2009–16, 2017–22
- **Antonio Nusa** – **RB Leipzig** – 2024–
- Ørjan Nyland – FC Ingolstadt, RB Leipzig – 2015–17, 2022–23
- Arne Larsen Økland – Bayer Leverkusen – 1980–83
- Terje Olsen – Bayer Leverkusen – 1988–89
- Leo Østigård – TSG Hoffenheim – 2024–25
- Morten Pedersen – Borussia M'gladbach – 1997–98
- Steinar Pedersen – Borussia Dortmund – 1996–98
- Tore Pedersen – FC St. Pauli, Eintracht Frankfurt – 1995–97, 1998–99
- Tore Reginiussen – Schalke 04 – 2009–10
- Kjetil Rekdal – Borussia M'gladbach, Hertha BSC – 1988–90, 1997–2000
- Birk Risa – 1. FC Köln – 2017–18
- Vidar Riseth – 1860 Munich – 2000–03
- **Alexander Røssing-Lelesiit** – **Hamburger SV** – 2025–
- **Julian Ryerson** – Union Berlin, **Borussia Dortmund** – 2019–
- **Sebastian Sebulonsen** – **1. FC Köln** – 2025–
- Bent Skammelsrud – Bayer Leverkusen – 1997–98
- Per Ciljan Skjelbred – Hamburger SV, Hertha BSC – 2011–20
- Vegard Skogheim – Werder Bremen – 1988–89
- Erik Solér – Hamburger SV – 1984–86
- Jan-Derek Sørensen – Borussia Dortmund – 2000–02
- Alexander Sørloth – RB Leipzig – 2020–21, 2022–23
- Gøran Sørloth – Borussia M'gladbach – 1988–89
- **Sander Tangvik** – **Hamburger SV** – 2025–
- Morten Thorsby – Union Berlin – 2022–23
- Erik Thorstvedt – Borussia M'gladbach – 1985–87
- **David Møller Wolfe** – **Hamburger SV** – 2026–

=== Poland ===
- Dariusz Adamczuk – Eintracht Frankfurt – 1992–93
- Wolfgang April (Bogdan Kwiecień) – Eintracht Frankfurt – 1985–86
- Henryk Bałuszyński – VfL Bochum – 1994–95, 1996–98, 2000–01
- Tomasz Bandrowski – Energie Cottbus – 2006–07
- Bartosz Białek – VfL Wolfsburg – 2020–22
- Jarosław Biernat – Eintracht Frankfurt – 1986–87, 1988–89
- Jakub Błaszczykowski – Borussia Dortmund, VfL Wolfsburg – 2007–15, 2016–19

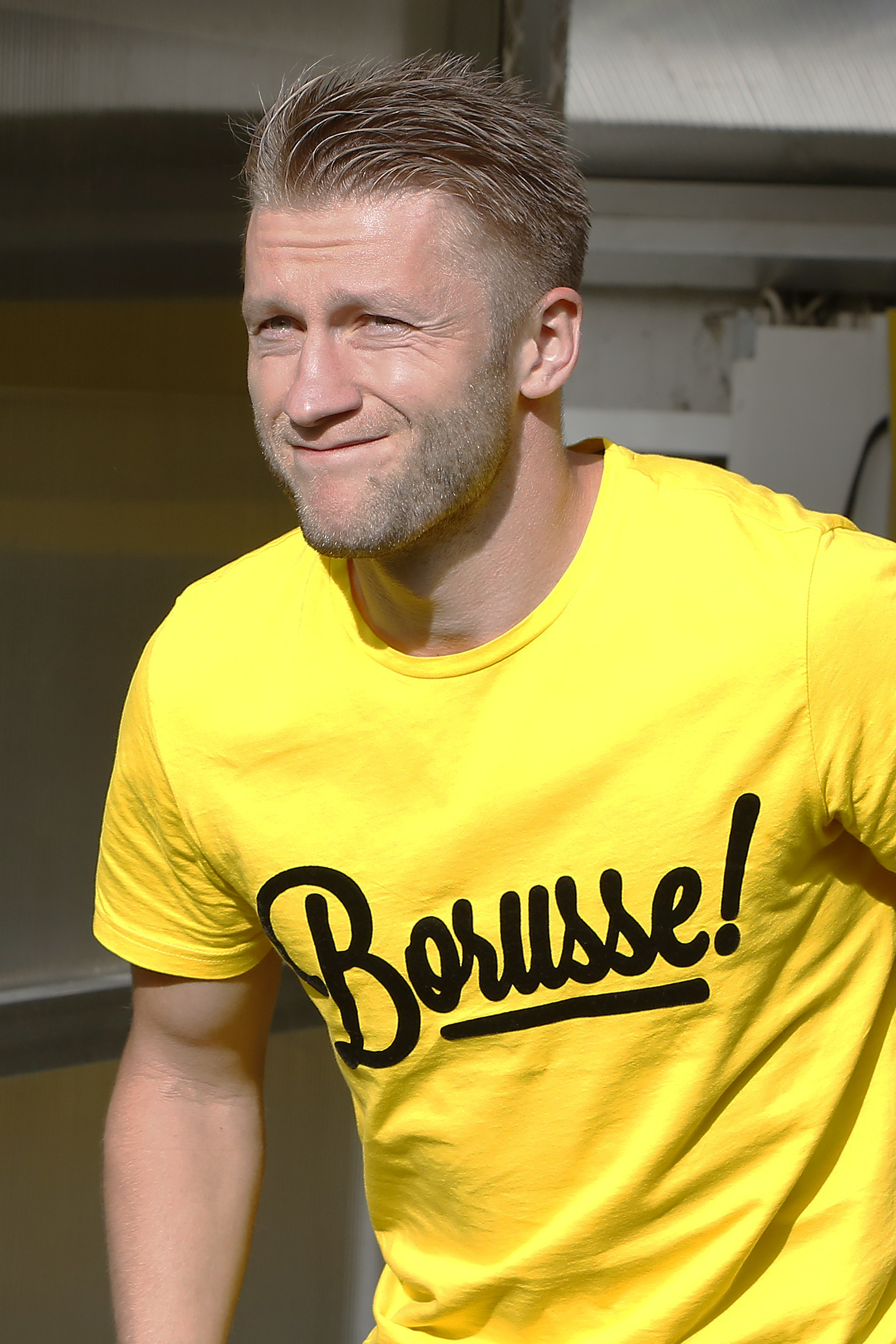
Błaszczykowski's Bundesliga career spanned eleven seasons with Dortmund and Wolfsburg.

- Sebastian Boenisch – Schalke 04, Werder Bremen, Bayer Leverkusen – 2005–16
- Daniel Bogusz – Arminia Bielefeld – 2002–03, 2004–05
- Ariel Borysiuk – 1. FC Kaiserslautern – 2011–12
- Bartosz Bosacki – 1. FC Nürnberg – 2004–06
- Andrzej Buncol – FC Homburg, Bayer Leverkusen, Fortuna Düsseldorf – 1986–92, 1995–97
- Sławomir Chałaśkiewicz – Hansa Rostock – 1995–98
- Ryszard Cyroń – Hamburger SV, Fortuna Düsseldorf – 1991–92, 1995–97
- Jacek Dembinski – Hamburger SV – 1997–2000
- Adam Dźwigała – FC St. Pauli – 2024–26
- Wenanty Fuhl – 1. FC Saarbrücken – 1992–93
- Jan Furtok – Hamburger SV, Eintracht Frankfurt – 1988–95
- Rafał Gikiewicz – SC Freiburg, Union Berlin, FC Augsburg – 2017–18, 2019–23
- Radosław Gilewicz – VfB Stuttgart, Karlsruher SC – 1995–98
- Janusz Góra – SSV Ulm – 1999–2000
- Jacek Góralski – VfL Bochum – 2022–23
- Kamil Grabara – VfL Wolfsburg – 2024–26
- Robert Gumny – FC Augsburg – 2020–25
- Tomasz Hajto – MSV Duisburg, Schalke 04, 1. FC Nürnberg – 1997–2005
- Krzysztof Hetmański – FC Homburg – 1989–90
- Joachim Hutka – Fortuna Düsseldorf – 1981–82
- Andrzej Iwan – VfL Bochum – 1987–89
- Michał Janicki – VfL Wolfsburg – 2002–03
- Dennis Jastrzembski – Hertha BSC – 2018–20, 2021–22
- Andrzej Juskowiak – Borussia M'gladbach, VfL Wolfsburg, Energie Cottbus – 1996–2003
- Radosław Kałużny – Energie Cottbus, Bayer Leverkusen – 2001–05
- **Jakub Kamiński** – VfL Wolfsburg, **1. FC Köln** – 2022–
- Marcin Kamiński – VfB Stuttgart, Fortuna Düsseldorf, Schalke 04 – 2017–19, 2020–21 2022–23
- Bartosz Kapustka – SC Freiburg – 2017–18
- Bartosz Karwan – Hertha BSC – 2002–04
- Tomasz Kłos – 1. FC Kaiserslautern, 1. FC Köln – 2000–04
- Andrzej Kobylański – 1. FC Köln, Energie Cottbus – 1992–94, 2000–03
- Martin Kobylański – Werder Bremen – 2013–14
- Tomasz Kos – 1. FC Nürnberg – 2001–03
- Kamil Kosowski – 1. FC Kaiserslautern – 2003–05
- **Dawid Kownacki** – Fortuna Düsseldorf, **Werder Bremen** – 2018–20, 2023–24
- Tadeusz Kraft – Borussia Dortmund – 1985–86
- Zbigniew Kruszyński – 1. FC Saarbrücken, FC Homburg – 1985–86, 1987–88
- Waldemar Kryger – VfL Wolfsburg – 1997–2002
- Paweł Kryszałowicz – Eintracht Frankfurt – 2000–01
- Jacek Krzynówek – 1. FC Nürnberg, Bayer Leverkusen, VfL Wolfsburg, Hannover 96 – 2001–03, 2004–10
- Mariusz Kukiełka – Energie Cottbus – 2006–09
- Adam Ledwoń – Bayer Leverkusen – 1997–99
- Andrzej Lesiak – Dynamo Dresden – 1994–95
- Marek Leśniak – Bayer Leverkusen, Wattenscheid 09, 1860 Munich, KFC Uerdingen – 1988–94, 1995–96
- **Jan Leszczyński** – **Borussia M'gladbach** – 2026–

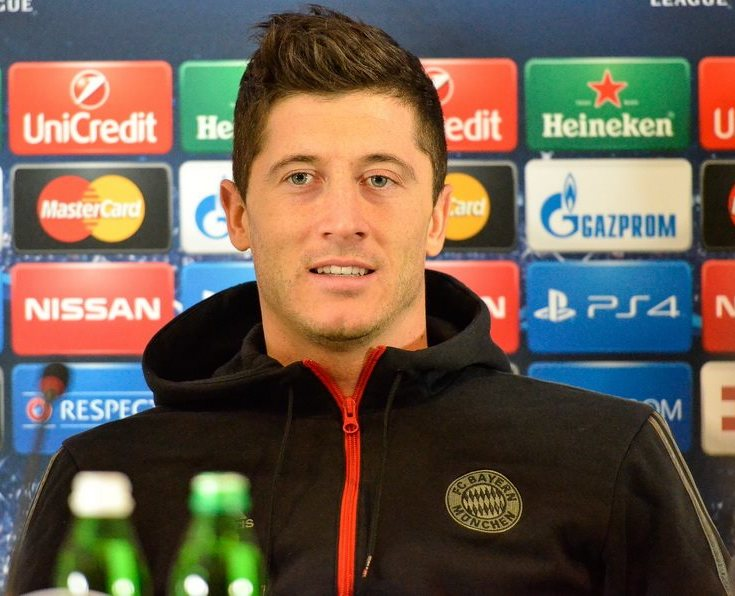
Robert Lewandowski, top goalscorer in 13–14, 15–16, 17–18, 18–19, 19–20, 20–21 and 21–22

- Robert Lewandowski – Borussia Dortmund, Bayern Munich – 2010–22
- Jarosław Lindner – Hannover 96 – 2009–10
- Marcel Lotka – Hertha BSC – 2021–22
- Sławomir Majak – Hansa Rostock – 1997–2001
- Stefan Majewski – 1. FC Kaiserslautern – 1984–87
- Adam Matuszczyk – 1. FC Köln – 2009–12, 2014–15
- Adam Matysek – Bayer Leverkusen – 1998–2001
- Waldemar Matysik – Hamburger SV – 1990–93
- Marcin Mięciel – Borussia M'gladbach, VfL Bochum – 2001–02, 2007–09
- Arkadiusz Milik – Bayer Leverkusen, FC Augsburg – 2012–14
- Maciej Murawski – Arminia Bielefeld – 2002–03
- Krzysztof Nowak – VfL Wolfsburg – 1998–2001
- Piotr Nowak – Dynamo Dresden, 1860 Munich – 1993–98
- Ludovic Obraniak – Werder Bremen – 2013–15
- Mirosław Okoński – Hamburger SV – 1986–88
- Paweł Olkowski – 1. FC Köln – 2014–18
- Andrzej Pałasz – Hannover 96 – 1987–89
- Sławomir Peszko – 1. FC Köln – 2010–12, 2014–15
- Krzysztof Piątek – Hertha BSC – 2019–21
- Łukasz Piszczek – Hertha BSC, Borussia Dortmund – 2007–21
- Eugen Polanski – Borussia M'gladbach, Mainz 05, TSG Hoffenheim – 2004–07, 2009–18
- **Łukasz Poręba** – **SV Elversberg** – 2026–
- **Kacper Potulski** – **Mainz 05** – 2025–
- Michał Probierz – Bayer Uerdingen – 1994–95
- Tymoteusz Puchacz – Union Berlin, Holstein Kiel – 2022–23, 2024–25
- Arkadiusz Pyrka – FC St. Pauli – 2025–
- Piotr Reiss – Hertha BSC, MSV Duisburg – 1998–2001
- Andrzej Rudy – 1. FC Köln – 1989–95
- Marek Saganowski – Hamburger SV – 1996–97
- Waldemar Słomiany – Schalke 04, Arminia Bielefeld – 1967–72
- Ebi Smolarek – Borussia Dortmund – 2004–08
- Włodzimierz Smolarek – Eintracht Frankfurt – 1986–88
- Artur Sobiech – Hannover 96 – 2011–16
- Mirosław Spiżak – SpVgg Unterhaching – 2000–01
- **Dariusz Stalmach** – **Werder Bremen** – 2026–
- Jarosław Studzizba – Eintracht Braunschweig – 1982–84
- Jakub Świerczok – 1. FC Kaiserslautern – 2011–12
- Dariusz Szubert – FC St. Pauli – 1995–96
- Cezary Tobollik – Eintracht Frankfurt – 1983–85
- Marek Trejgis – Hamburger SV – 1997–99
- Przemysław Trytko – Energie Cottbus – 2007–08
- Janusz Turowski – Eintracht Frankfurt – 1986–91

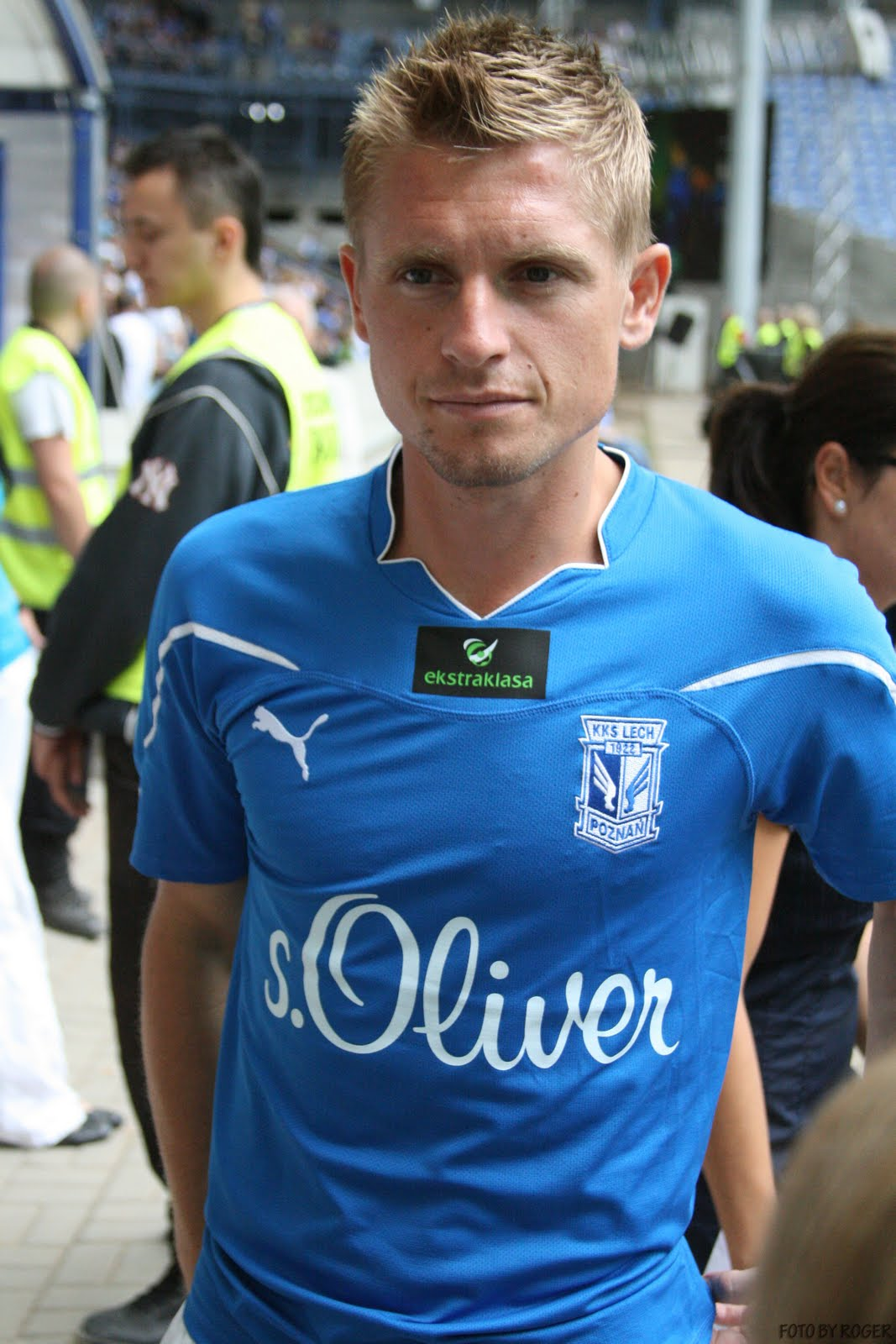
Artur Wichniarek is the Bundesliga all-time top goalscorer of Arminia Bielefeld (45 goals).

- Sebastian Tyrała – Borussia Dortmund, Greuther Fürth – 2006–08, 2012–13
- Piotr Tyszkiewicz – VfL Wolfsburg – 1997–98
- Przemysław Tytoń – VfB Stuttgart – 2015–16
- Helmut Vorreiter – Darmstadt 98 – 1981–82
- Tomasz Wałdoch – VfL Bochum, Schalke 04 – 1994–95, 1996–2006
- Witold Wawrzyczek – Energie Cottbus – 2000–02
- Artur Wichniarek – Arminia Bielefeld, Hertha BSC – 1999–2000, 2002–10
- Jakub Wierzchowski – Werder Bremen – 2002–03
- Grzegorz Więzik – 1. FC Kaiserslautern – 1989–90
- Tomasz Wisio – Arminia Bielefeld – 2004–05
- **Oskar Wójcik** – **Werder Bremen** – 2026–
- Roman Wójcicki – FC Homburg – 1986–88
- Sławomir Wojciechowski – Bayern Munich – 1999–2000
- Paweł Wojtala – Hamburger SV, Werder Bremen – 1996–2000
- Rudolf Wojtowicz – Bayer Leverkusen, Fortuna Düsseldorf – 1982–87, 1989–92
- Łukasz Załuska – Darmstadt 98 – 2015–16
- Tomasz Zdebel – 1. FC Köln, VfL Bochum, Bayer Leverkusen – 1993–97, 2003–05, 2006–10
- Dariusz Żuraw – Hannover 96 – 2002–08

=== Portugal ===
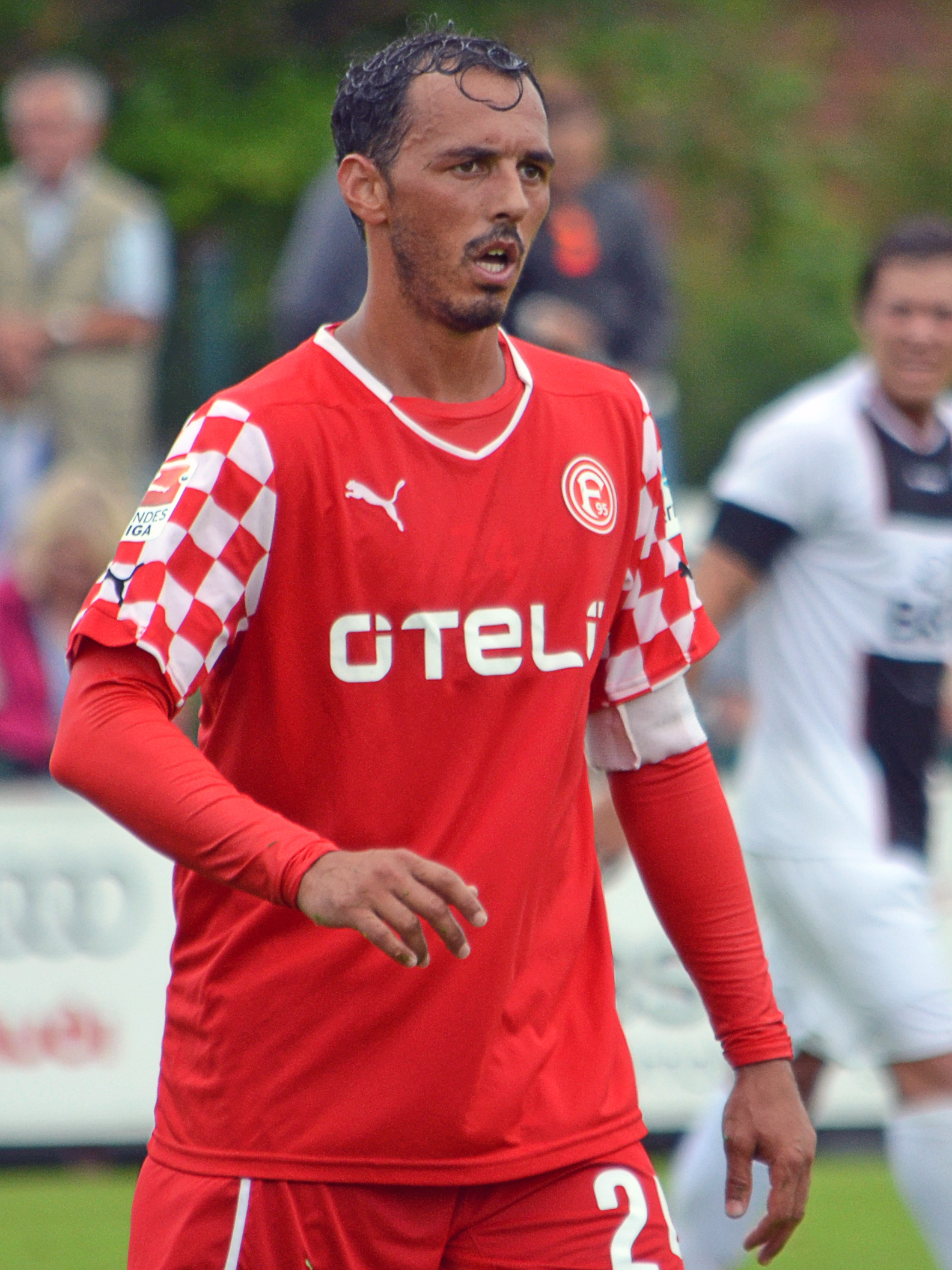
Sergio Pinto

- Alex – VfL Wolfsburg – 2005–07
- Hugo Almeida – Werder Bremen, Hannover 96 – 2006–11, 2015–16
- **Fabio Baldé** – **Hamburger SV** – 2025–
- Bruma – RB Leipzig – 2017–19
- Aurélio Buta – Eintracht Frankfurt – 2022–24, 2025–26
- João Cancelo – Bayern Munich – 2022–23
- Carlitos – Hannover 96 – 2010–12
- Fábio Carvalho – RB Leipzig – 2023–24
- Marcel Correia – Eintracht Braunschweig – 2013–14
- Ricardo Costa – VfL Wolfsburg – 2007–10
- Tiago Dantas – Bayern Munich – 2020–21
- Gil Dias – VfB Stuttgart – 2022–23
- José Dominguez – 1. FC Kaiserslautern – 2000–04
- Daniel Fernandes – VfL Bochum – 2008–10
- Raphaël Guerreiro – Borussia Dortmund, Bayern Munich – 2016–26
- Daniel Heuer Fernandes – Darmstadt 98 – 2016–17
- Diogo Leite – Union Berlin – 2022–26
- Maniche – 1. FC Köln – 2009–10
- Fernando Meira – VfB Stuttgart – 2001–08
- **Afonso Moreira** – **Bayer Leverkusen** – 2026–
- Gonçalo Paciência – Eintracht Frankfurt, Schalke 04 – 2018–22
- João Palhinha – Bayern Munich – 2024–25
- João Pereira – Hannover 96 – 2014–15
- Mathias Pereira Lage – FC St. Pauli – 2025–26
- Petit – 1. FC Köln – 2008–11
- Roberto Pinto – VfB Stuttgart, Hertha BSC, Arminia Bielefeld – 1998–2006
- Sérgio Pinto – Schalke 04, Alemannia Aachen, Hannover 96 – 1999–2000, 2002–04, 2006–13
- Eduardo Quaresma – TSG Hoffenheim – 2022–23
- Guilherme Ramos – Arminia Bielefeld – 2021–22
- **Rodrigo Ribeiro** – **FC Augsburg** – 2025–
- Renato Sanches – Bayern Munich – 2016–17, 2018–19
- **David Santos Daiber** – **Bayern Munich** – 2025–
- Henrique Sereno – 1. FC Köln – 2011–12
- André Silva – Eintracht Frankfurt, RB Leipzig, Werder Bremen – 2019–23, 2024–25
- **Fábio Silva** – **Borussia Dortmund** – 2025–
- Paulo Sousa – Borussia Dortmund – 1996–98
- Ricardo Sousa – Hannover 96 – 2004–06
- **Tiago Tomás** – **VfB Stuttgart**, VfL Wolfsburg – 2021–
- Renato Veiga – FC Augsburg – 2022–23
- **Fábio Vieira** – **Hamburger SV** – 2025–
- Vieirinha – VfL Wolfsburg – 2011–17
- Abel Xavier – Hannover 96 – 2003–04
- Zé António – Borussia M'gladbach – 2005–07

=== Republic of Ireland ===
- Noel Campbell – Fortuna Köln – 1973–74
- Alan Clarke – Blau-Weiß 90 Berlin – 1986–87
- Patrick Kohlmann – Borussia Dortmund – 2004–05
- Conor Noß – Borussia M'gladbach – 2021–22

=== Romania ===
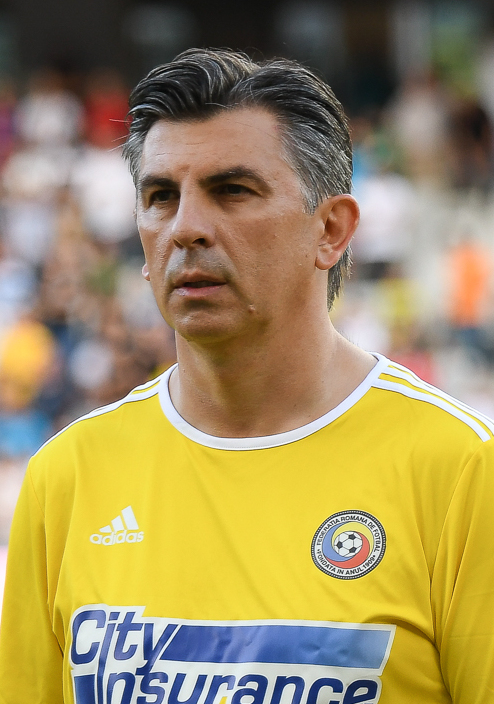
Ioan Lupescu

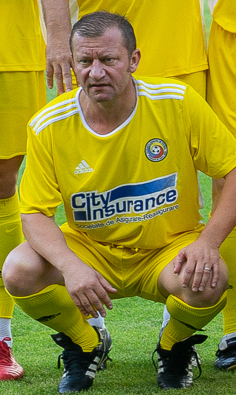
Dorinel Munteanu

- Ovidiu Burcă – Energie Cottbus – 2008–09
- Ciprian Deac – Schalke 04 – 2010–11
- Iulian Filipescu – MSV Duisburg – 2007–08
- Ionel Ganea – VfB Stuttgart – 1999–2003
- Vasile Gergely – Hertha BSC – 1970–72
- Sabin Ilie – Energie Cottbus – 2000–01
- Viorel Ion – VfL Bochum – 1998–99
- Ion Ionescu – Alemannia Aachen – 1968–70
- Alexandru Ioniță – 1. FC Köln – 2010–11
- Andreas Ivan – Schalke 04 – 2022–23
- Emil Jula – Energie Cottbus – 2008–09
- Michael Klein – Bayer Uerdingen – 1990–91, 1992–93
- Ioan Lupescu – Bayer Leverkusen, Borussia M'gladbach – 1990–98
- Ciprian Marica – VfB Stuttgart, Schalke 04 – 2007–13
- Alexandru Maxim – VfB Stuttgart, Mainz 05 – 2012–16, 2017–20
- Dorinel Munteanu – 1. FC Köln, VfL Wolfsburg – 1995–98, 1999–2004
- Vlad Munteanu – Energie Cottbus, VfL Wolfsburg, Arminia Bielefeld – 2006–09
- Dumitru Nadu – Karlsruher SC – 1982–83, 1984–85
- Viorel Năstase – 1860 Munich – 1980–81
- Maximilian Nicu – Hertha BSC, SC Freiburg – 2008–12
- Marius Niculae – Mainz 05 – 2006–07
- Claudiu Niculescu – MSV Duisburg – 2007–08
- Gheorghe Popescu – Hannover 96 – 2002–03
- Cătălin Răcănel – FC St. Pauli – 2001–02
- Sergiu Radu – Energie Cottbus, VfL Wolfsburg, VfB Stuttgart, 1. FC Köln – 2006–09
- Claudiu Răducanu – Arminia Bielefeld – 2004–05
- Marcel Răducanu – Borussia Dortmund – 1982–88
- Florin Răducioiu – VfB Stuttgart – 1997–98
- Laurențiu Reghecampf – Energie Cottbus, Alemannia Aachen – 2000–03, 2006–07
- Alexandru Sătmăreanu – VfB Stuttgart – 1980–82
- Mihai Tararache – MSV Duisburg – 2005–06, 2007–08
- Daniel Timofte – Bayer Uerdingen – 1990–91
- Ion Vlădoiu – 1. FC Köln – 1996–98

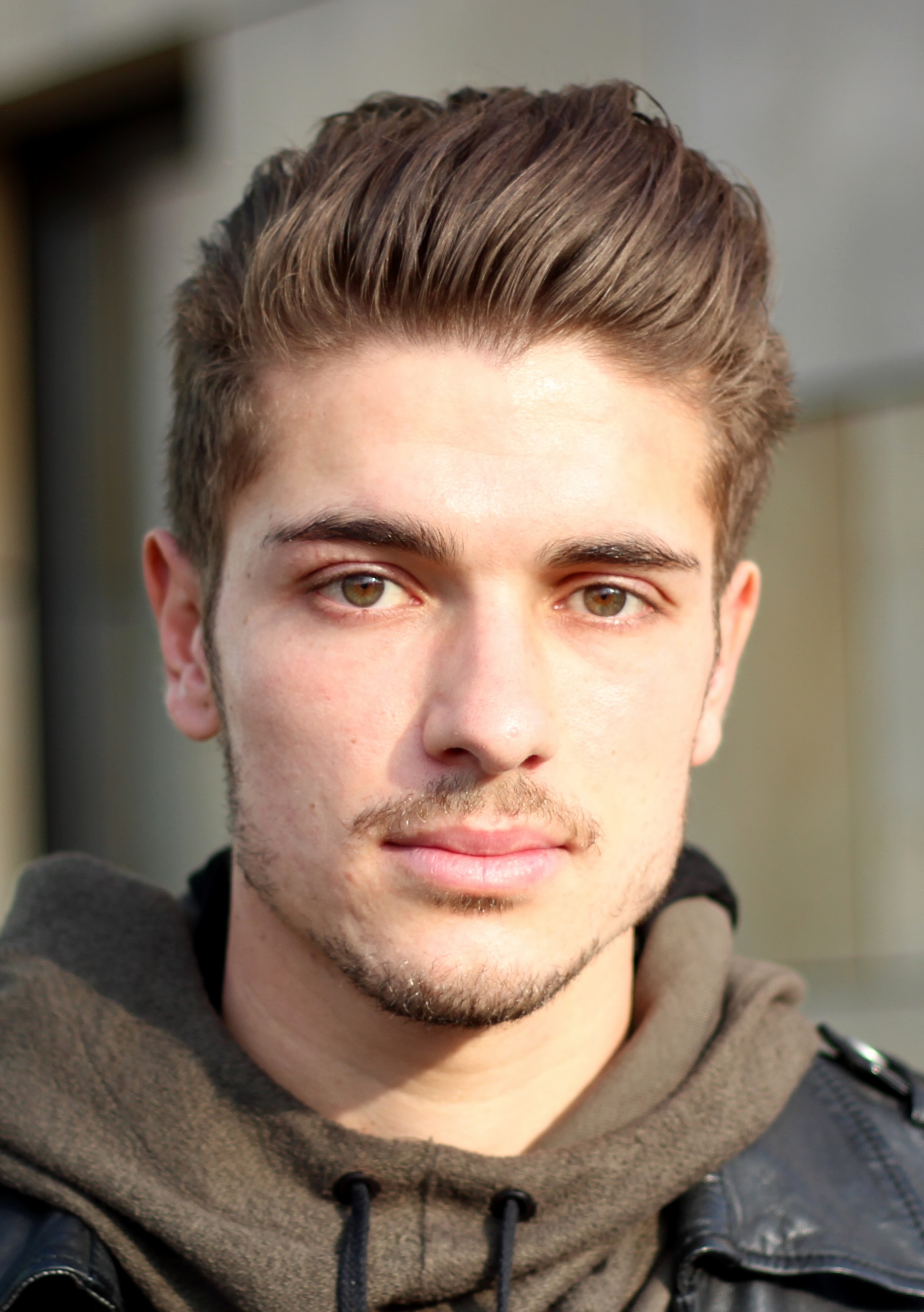
Roman Neustädter, born in Ukraine (then part of the Soviet Union), International for Germany and Russia

=== Russia ===
Until 1991 Soviet Union, from 1991 to 1992 CIS

- Vladimir Beschastnykh – Werder Bremen – 1994–97
- Aleksandr Borodyuk – Schalke 04, SC Freiburg – 1991–96
- Dmitri Bulykin – Bayer Leverkusen – 2007–09
- Vladimir But – Borussia Dortmund, SC Freiburg, Hannover 96 – 1996–2002, 2003–05
- Stanislav Cherchesov – Dynamo Dresden – 1993–95
- Valeriy Chmarov – Karlsruher SC – 1991–94
- Igor Dobrovolski – Fortuna Düsseldorf – 1996–97
- Sergei Gorlukovich – Borussia Dortmund, Bayer Uerdingen – 1989–93, 1994–95
- Sergei Kiriakov – Karlsruher SC, Hamburger SV – 1992–99
- Denis Klyuyev – Schalke 04 – 1997–99
- Andrey Lunyov – Bayer Leverkusen – 2021–23
- Sergei Mandreko – Hertha BSC, VfL Bochum – 1997–2001, 2002–03
- Roman Neustädter – Borussia M'gladbach, Schalke 04 – 2009–16
- Nikolai Pisarev – FC St. Pauli – 1996–97
- Pavel Pogrebnyak – VfB Stuttgart – 2009–12
- Konstantin Rausch – Hannover 96, VfB Stuttgart, SV Darmstadt 98, 1. FC Köln – 2007–18
- Aleksandr Rytchkov – 1. FC Köln – 1997–98
- Ivan Saenko – 1. FC Nürnberg – 2005–08
- Yuri Savichev – 1. FC Saarbrücken, FC St. Pauli – 1992–93, 1995–97
- Igor Shalimov – MSV Duisburg – 1994–95
- Sergei Yuran – Fortuna Düsseldorf, VfL Bochum – 1996–98

=== Scotland ===
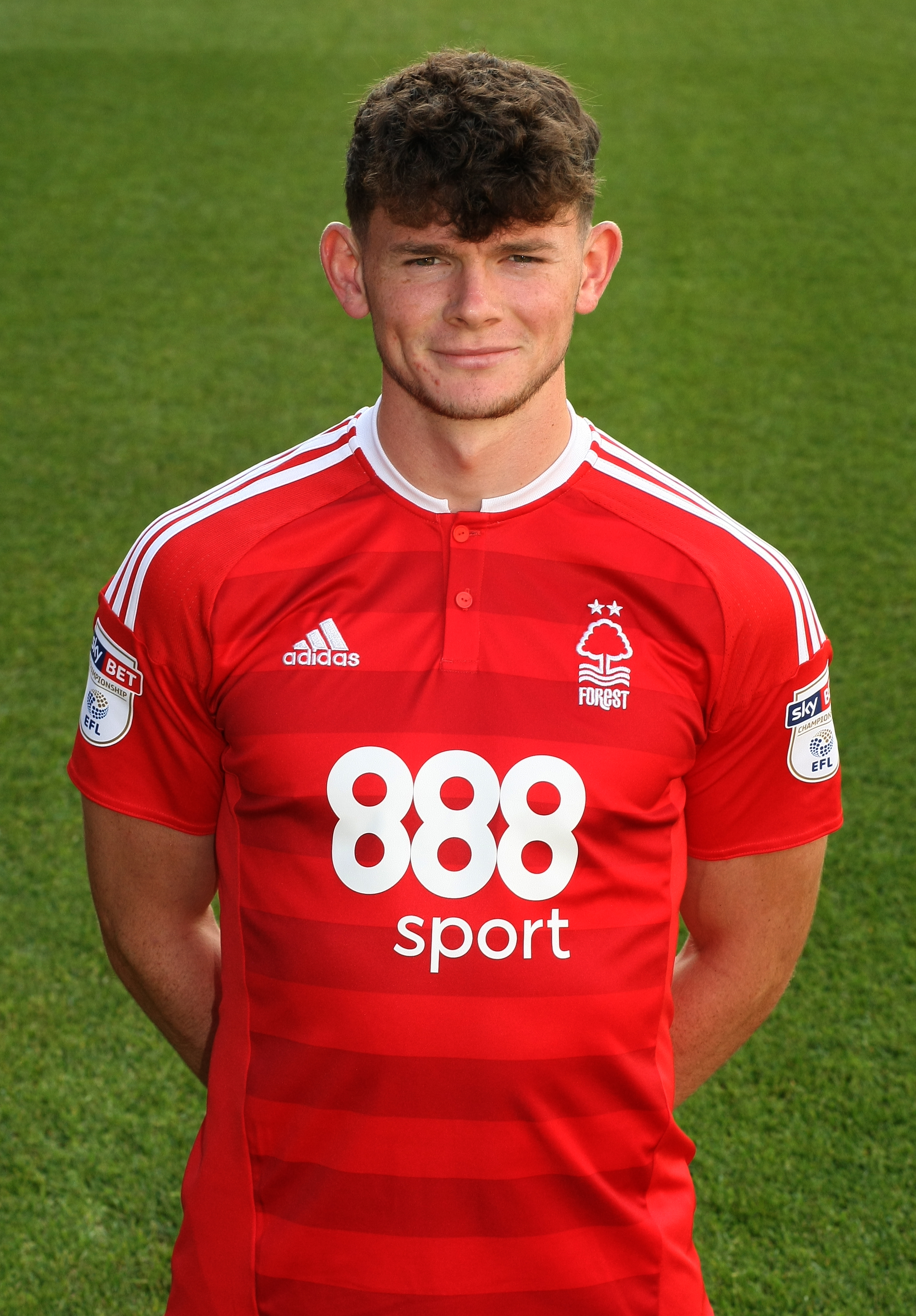
Oliver Burke, topscorers in 2016-2022

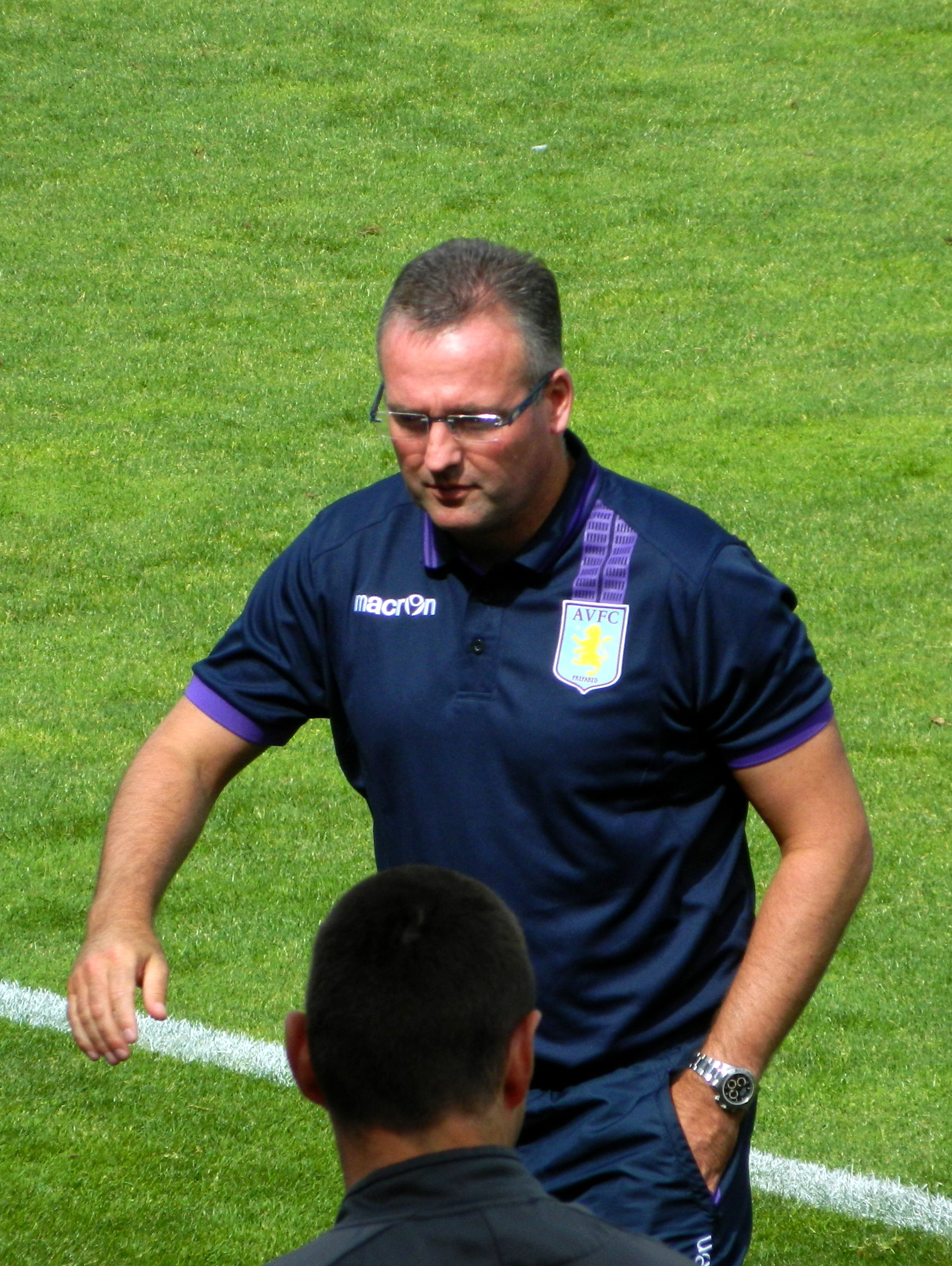
Paul Lambert won in the Year

- Scott Banks – FC St. Pauli – 2024–26
- Scott Booth – Borussia Dortmund – 1997–98
- **Oliver Burke** – RB Leipzig, Werder Bremen, **Union Berlin** – 2016–17, 2022–
- Fraser Hornby – Darmstadt 98 – 2023–24
- Paul Lambert – Borussia Dortmund – 1996–98
- Murdo MacLeod – Borussia Dortmund – 1987–91
- Mark McGhee – Hamburger SV – 1984–86
- Alan McInally – Bayern Munich – 1989–92
- Vincent Mennie – 1. FC Köln – 1983–86
- Brian O'Neil – VfL Wolfsburg – 1998–2001

=== Serbia ===
Until 1992 SFR Yugoslavia, from 1992 to 2003 FR Yugoslavia, from 2003 to 2006 Serbia and Montenegro

- Aleksandar Abutović – 1. FC Nürnberg – 1988–89
- Jovan Aćimović – 1. FC Saarbrücken – 1976–78
- Srđan Baljak – Mainz 05 – 2009–10
- Milan Belić – 1. FC Nürnberg – 2002–03
- Stevan Bena – 1860 Munich, Hannover 96 – 1964–67
- Rade Bogdanović – Werder Bremen, Arminia Bielefeld – 1998–2001, 2002–03
- Srđan Čebinac – 1. FC Köln – 1965–66
- Zvezdan Čebinac – 1. FC Nürnberg, Hannover 96 – 1967–71
- Sava-Arangel Čestić – 1. FC Köln – 2020–21
- Željko Dakić – Bayer Uerdingen – 1992–93
- Boriša Đorđević – Hamburger SV – 1981–83
- Bratislav Đorđević – 1. FC Kaiserslautern – 1970–71
- Kristijan Đorđević – VfB Stuttgart, Schalke 04 – 1996–2002
- Slobodan Dubajić – VfB Stuttgart – 1991–95
- Nikola Đurđić – Greuther Fürth, FC Augsburg – 2012–13, 2014–15
- Demir Đurić – FC St. Pauli – 1996–97
- Filip Đuričić – Mainz 05 – 2014–15
- Vladimir Durković – Borussia M'gladbach – 1966–67
- Mijat Gaćinović – Eintracht Frankfurt, TSG Hoffenheim – 2015–22
- Marko Grujić – Hertha BSC – 2018–20
- Aleksandar Ignjovski – Werder Bremen, Eintracht Frankfurt, SC Freiburg – 2011–17
- **Andrej Ilić** – **Union Berlin** – 2024–
- Dragomir Ilic – Werder Bremen – 1963–64
- Ivica Iliev – Energie Cottbus – 2008–09
- Marko Ivezić – Holstein Kiel – 2024–25
- Vladimir Ivić – Borussia M'gladbach – 2004–05
- Srđan Janković – Wattenscheid 09 – 1990–92
- Branko Jelić – Energie Cottbus – 2007–09
- Miloš Jojić – Borussia Dortmund, 1. FC Köln – 2013–18
- **Lazar Jovanović** – **VfB Stuttgart** – 2025–
- Dejan Joveljić – Eintracht Frankfurt – 2019–20
- Luka Jović – Eintracht Frankfurt – 2017–19, 2020–21
- Živojin Juškić – 1. FC Nürnberg – 1998–99
- Gojko Kačar – Hertha BSC, Hamburger SV, FC Augsburg – 2007–13, 2014–18
- Slobodan Komljenović – Eintracht Frankfurt, MSV Duisburg, 1. FC Kaiserslautern – 1992–96, 1997–2001
- Filip Kostić – VfB Stuttgart, Hamburger SV, Eintracht Frankfurt – 2014–23
- Mladen Krstajić – Werder Bremen, Schalke 04 – 2000–09
- Nebojša Krupniković – Hannover 96, Arminia Bielefeld – 2002–06
- Filip Kusić – 1. FC Köln – 2017–18
- Zdravko Kuzmanović – VfB Stuttgart – 2009–13
- Miladin Lazić – Karlsruher SC – 1982–83
- Danko Lazović – Bayer Leverkusen – 2005–06
- Danijel Ljuboja – VfB Stuttgart, Hamburger SV, VfL Wolfsburg – 2005–09
- **Andrija Maksimović** – **RB Leipzig** – 2025–
- Miloš Marić – VfL Bochum – 2009–10
- Saša Marković – VfB Stuttgart – 1998–99
- Erhan Mašović – VfL Bochum – 2021–25
- Slobodan Medojević – VfL Wolfsburg, Eintracht Frankfurt – 2012–16, 2017–18
- Jovan Miladinović – 1. FC Nürnberg – 1966–67
- Pedro Milasinčić – Hannover 96 – 1972–73
- Zoran Milinković – Hansa Rostock – 1998–99
- **Jovan Milošević** – **VfB Stuttgart**, Werder Bremen – 2023–
- Vladan Milovanović – Dynamo Dresden – 1992–93
- Borisav Mitrović – Karlsruher SC – 1984–85
- Stefan Mitrović – SC Freiburg – 2014–15
- Filip Mladenović – 1. FC Köln – 2015–17
- Marko Mladenović – Eintracht Frankfurt – 2023–24
- Dragan Mutibarić – Schalke 04 – 1975–76
- Matija Nastasić – Schalke 04 – 2014–21
- **Kosta Nedeljković** – **RB Leipzig** – 2024–
- Bojan Neziri – VfL Wolfsburg – 2005–06
- Žarko Nikolić – Schalke 04 – 1966–68
- Milan Obradović – Borussia M'gladbach – 2003–04
- Perica Ognjenović – 1. FC Kaiserslautern – 2001–02
- Marko Pantelić – Hertha BSC – 2005–09
- Vladimir Pašić – Fortuna Düsseldorf – 1996–97
- Miloš Pantović – Bayern Munich, VfL Bochum, Union Berlin – 2015–16, 2021–24
- Veljko Paunović – Hannover 96 – 2004–05
- Đorđe Pavlić – MSV Duisburg – 1966–72
- Nemanja Pejčinović – Hertha BSC – 2009–10
- Dušan Petković – VfL Wolfsburg, 1. FC Nürnberg – 2001–03
- Nikola Petković – Eintracht Frankfurt – 2008–11
- Miodrag Petrović – 1. FC Köln, Werder Bremen – 1975–77
- Slobodan Petrović – 1. FC Nürnberg – 1978–79
- Milorad Pilipović – Karlsruher SC – 1987–90
- Darko Pivaljević – 1. FC Köln – 2000–02
- Milorad Popović – 1. FC Nürnberg – 2002–03
- Vladica Popović – VfB Stuttgart – 1965–66
- Petar Radenković – 1860 Munich – 1963–70
- Nemanja Radonjić – Hertha BSC – 2020–21
- Slobodan Rajković – Hamburger SV, Darmstadt 98 – 2011–16
- Sreto Ristić – VfB Stuttgart – 1996–2000
- Mileta Rnić – Arminia Bielefeld – 1978–79
- Antonio Rukavina – Borussia Dortmund – 2007–09
- Lazar Samardžić – Hertha BSC, RB Leipzig – 2019–21
- Dragoslav Šekularac – Karlsruher SC – 1966–67
- Milutin Šoškić – 1. FC Köln – 1966–69, 1970–71
- Aleksandar Stevanović – Werder Bremen – 2011–13
- Dragan Stevanović – VfL Wolfsburg – 1997–98
- Predrag Stevanović – Werder Bremen – 2010–11
- Dragoslav Stepanović – Eintracht Frankfurt – 1976–78
- Miroslav Stević – Dynamo Dresden, 1860 Munich, Borussia Dortmund, VfL Bochum – 1992–2002, 2003–04
- Damir Stojak – Eintracht Frankfurt – 1998–99

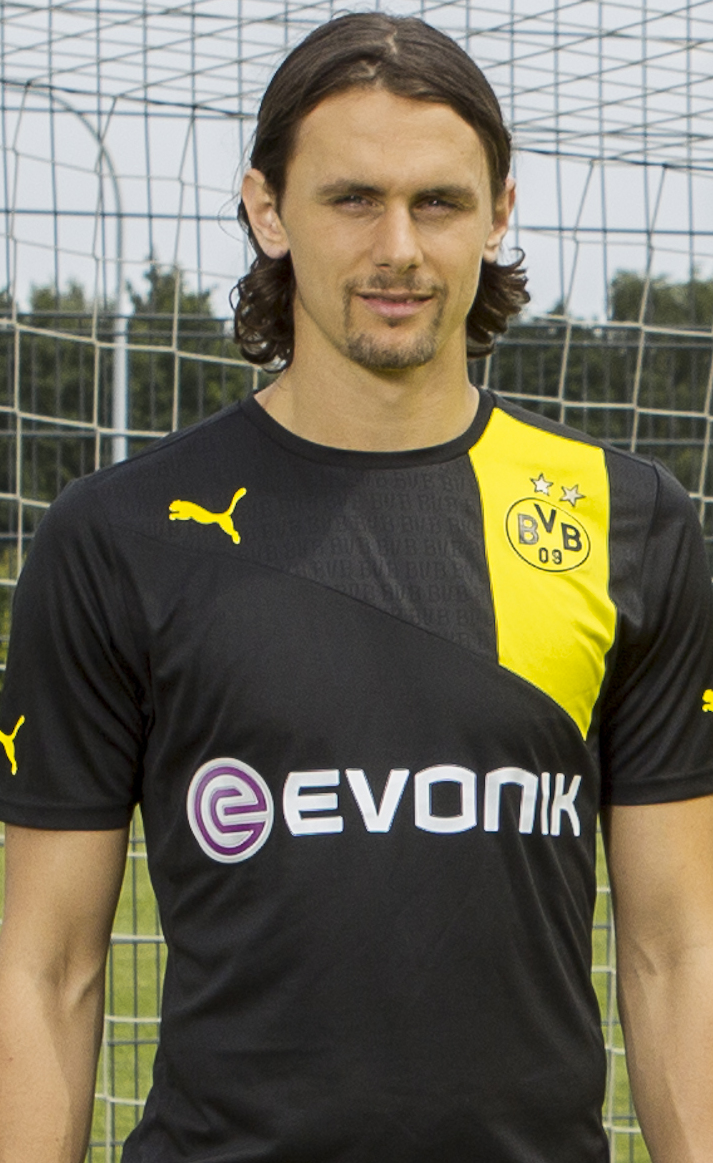
Neven Subotić formed with Mats Hummels the centre-back pairing of Borussia Dortmund during the Jürgen Klopp era (2008–2015).

- Neven Subotić – Mainz 05, Borussia Dortmund, 1. FC Köln, Union Berlin – 2006–07, 2008–18, 2019–20
- Stanko Svitlica – Hannover 96 – 2003–04
- Rade Todorović – 1. FC Nürnberg – 2002–03
- Slobodan Topalović – 1. FC Köln – 1974–77
- Duško Tošić – Werder Bremen – 2007–10
- Zoran Tošić – 1. FC Köln – 2009–10
- Dragan Trkulja – SSV Ulm – 1999–2000
- Dušan Vasiljević – Energie Cottbus – 2007–09
- Miloš Veljković – Werder Bremen – 2015–21, 2022–25
- Miroslav Vjetrović – Hannover 96 – 1985–86
- Nemanja Vučićević – 1. FC Köln – 2008–09
- Ivan Vukomanović – 1. FC Köln – 2000–01
- Ilija Zavišić – Eintracht Braunschweig – 1981–84
- Miodrag Živaljević – 1. FC Nürnberg – 1978–79

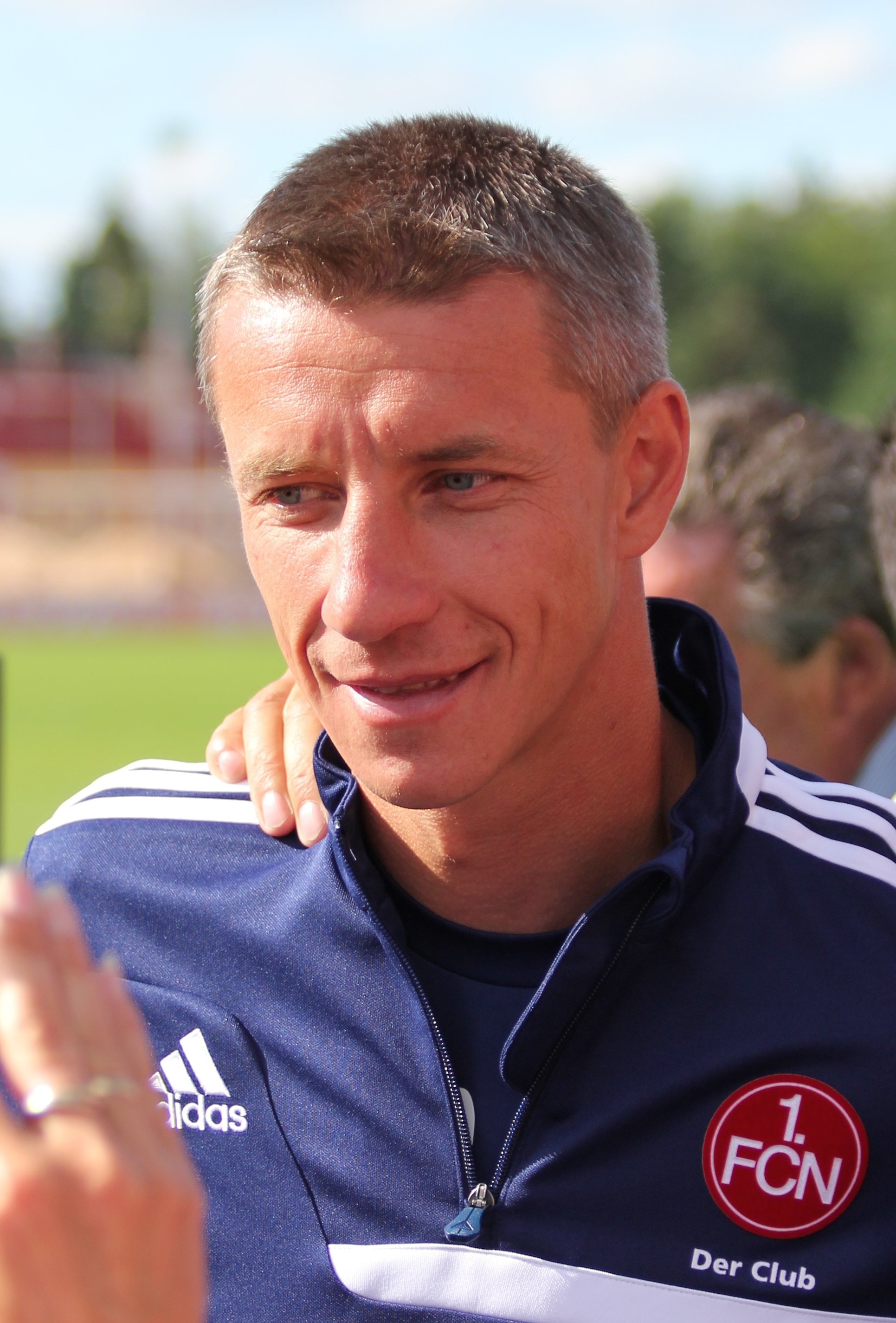
Marek Mintál, top goalscorer in 04–05

=== Slovakia ===
Until 1992 part of Czechoslovakia

- **László Bénes** – Borussia M'gladbach, FC Augsburg, **Union Berlin** – 2016–22, 2024–
- Matúš Bero – VfL Bochum – 2023–25
- Balázs Borbély – 1. FC Kaiserslautern – 2005–06
- Igor Demo – Borussia M'gladbach – 2001–05
- Ondrej Duda – Hertha BSC, 1. FC Köln – 2016–23
- Ján Ďurica – Hannover 96 – 2009–10
- Vratislav Greško – Bayer Leverkusen, 1. FC Nürnberg – 1999–2001, 2006–08
- Karim Guédé – SC Freiburg – 2011–15, 2016–18
- Ľuboš Hanzel – Schalke 04 – 2009–10
- Milan Ivana – Darmstadt 98 – 2015–16
- Dominik Javorček – Holstein Kiel – 2024–26
- Erik Jendrišek – Hannover 96, Schalke 04, SC Freiburg – 2006–07, 2010–13
- Miroslav Karhan – VfL Wolfsburg, Mainz 05 – 2001–07, 2009–11
- Ján Kocian – FC St. Pauli – 1988–91
- Robert Kocis – Fortuna Düsseldorf – 1996–97
- Róbert Mak – 1. FC Nürnberg – 2010–14
- Pavel Mareček – MSV Duisburg – 1969–70
- Marek Mintál – 1. FC Nürnberg – 2004–08, 2009–11
- Ľubomír Moravčík – MSV Duisburg – 1998–99
- Adam Nemec – 1. FC Kaiserslautern – 2010–12
- Szilárd Németh – Alemannia Aachen – 2006–07
- Peter Pekarík – VfL Wolfsburg, Hertha BSC – 2008–11, 2013–
- Marek Penksa – Eintracht Frankfurt, Dynamo Dresden – 1992–95
- **Ludovit Reis** – **Werder Bremen** – 2026–
- **Leo Sauer** – **VfB Stuttgart** – 2026–
- Stanislav Šesták – VfL Bochum – 2007–10
- Samuel Slovák – 1. FC Nürnberg – 2004–06
- Dušan Švento – 1. FC Köln – 2014–16
- Denis Vavro – VfL Wolfsburg – 2024–26
- Róbert Vittek – 1. FC Nürnberg – 2004–08
- Radoslav Zabavník – Mainz 05 – 2009–13
- Adam Zreľák – 1. FC Nürnberg – 2018–19

=== Slovenia ===
Until 1991 part of SFR Yugoslavia

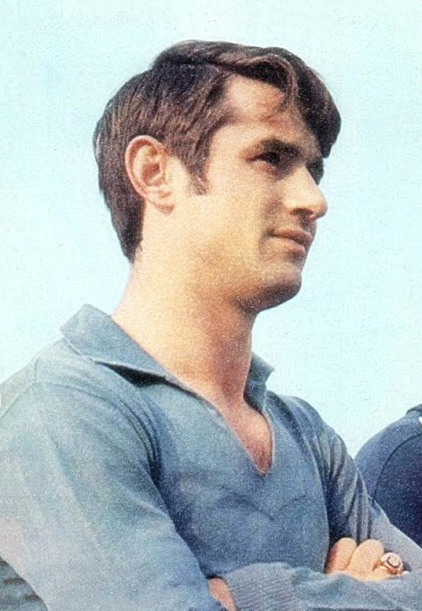
Dragan Holcer

- Roman Bezjak – Darmstadt 98 – 2016–17
- Mišo Brečko – Hamburger SV, 1. FC Köln – 2004–05, 2007–12, 2014–15
- Spasoje Bulajič – 1. FC Köln – 2000–02
- Zlatko Dedić – VfL Bochum – 2009–10
- Emir Dzafič – VfL Bochum – 1998–99
- Dragan Holcer – VfB Stuttgart – 1977–81
- Rudi Istenič – Fortuna Düsseldorf – 1995–97
- Kevin Kampl – Borussia Dortmund, Bayer Leverkusen, RB Leipzig – 2014–26
- Adem Kapič – MSV Duisburg – 1997–98
- Srečko Katanec – VfB Stuttgart – 1988–89
- Aleksander Knavs – 1. FC Kaiserslautern, VfL Bochum – 2001–05
- Klemen Lavrič – MSV Duisburg – 2005–06, 2007–08
- Dominic Maroh – 1. FC Nürnberg, 1. FC Köln – 2009–12, 2014–18
- Tim Matavž – FC Augsburg – 2014–16
- Džoni Novak – SpVgg Unterhaching – 2000–01
- Milivoje Novaković – 1. FC Köln – 2008–12
- Branko Oblak – Schalke 04, Bayern Munich – 1975–80
- Miran Pavlin – SC Freiburg – 1998–2000
- Danilo Popivoda – Eintracht Braunschweig – 1975–80
- Branko Rodošek – Bayer Uerdingen – 1983–84, 1985–86
- Benjamin Šeško – RB Leipzig – 2023–25
- Rajko Tavčar – 1. FC Nürnberg – 2001–02
- David Zec – Holstein Kiel – 2024–25

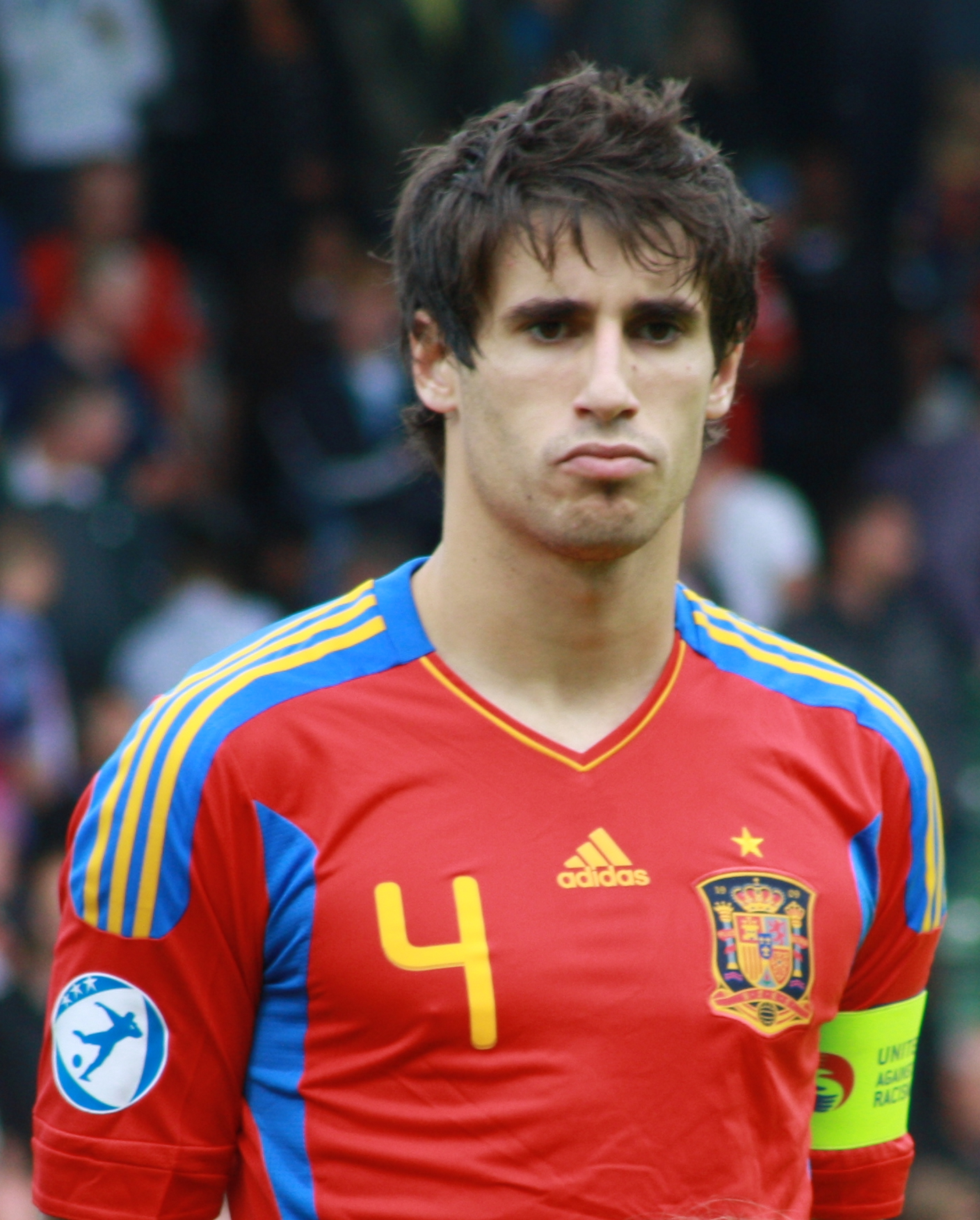
Javi Martínez's move to Bayern Munich previously held the record for the most expensive incoming transfer in Bundesliga history.

=== Spain ===
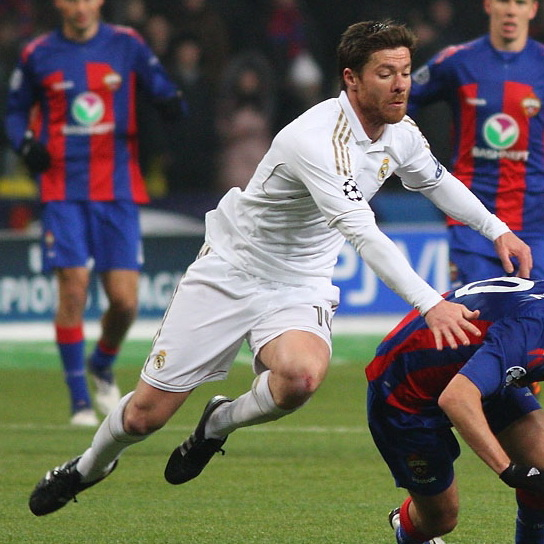
Xabi Alonso

- Paco Alcácer – Borussia Dortmund – 2018–20
- Xabi Alonso – Bayern Munich – 2014–17
- Chema Andrés – VfB Stuttgart – 2025–26
- Angeliño – RB Leipzig, TSG Hoffenheim – 2019–23
- Marc Bartra – Borussia Dortmund – 2016–18
- Juan Bernat – Bayern Munich – 2014–18
- Pep Biel – FC Augsburg – 2023–24
- Bojan – Mainz 05 – 2016–17
- Iker Bravo – Bayer Leverkusen – 2021–22
- Ignacio Camacho – VfL Wolfsburg – 2017–19
- José Campaña – 1. FC Nürnberg – 2013–14
- Dani Carvajal – Bayer Leverkusen – 2012–13
- Thomas Christiansen – VfL Bochum, Hannover 96 – 2000–01, 2002–06
- **Chuki** – **Werder Bremen** – 2026–
- Coke – Schalke 04 – 2016–18
- Álvaro Domínguez – Borussia M'gladbach – 2012–16
- Sergio Escudero – Schalke 04 – 2010–12
- Ezequiel – SC Freiburg – 2012–13
- Fernando – Hannover 96 – 2002–03
- Nacho Ferri – Eintracht Frankfurt – 2023–24
- Álex Gálvez – Werder Bremen – 2014–16
- **Aleix García** – **Bayer Leverkusen** – 2024–
- Alfonso Garcia – SpVgg Unterhaching – 1999–2001
- Sergio Gómez – Borussia Dortmund – 2017–18
- Álex Grimaldo – Bayer Leverkusen – 2023–26
- **Marc Guiu** – **RB Leipzig** – 2026–
- **Miguel Gutiérrez** – **Bayer Leverkusen** – 2026–
- Mario Hermoso – Bayer Leverkusen – 2024–25
- Borja Iglesias – Bayer Leverkusen – 2023–24
- Pablo Insua – Schalke 04 – 2017–18
- Jaime – Hannover 96 – 2002–04
- Jairo – Mainz 05 – 2014–18
- José Manuel – Hannover 96 – 2002–03
- Joselu – TSG Hoffenheim, Eintracht Frankfurt, Hannover 96 – 2012–15
- Juanan – Fortuna Düsseldorf – 2012–13
- José Manuel Jurado – Schalke 04 – 2010–12
- Diego León – Arminia Bielefeld – 2004–06
- Pablo Maffeo – VfB Stuttgart – 2018–19
- Aarón Martín – Mainz 05 – 2018–23
- Javi Martínez – Bayern Munich – 2012–21
- Josep Martínez – RB Leipzig – 2020–22
- Borja Mayoral – VfL Wolfsburg – 2016–17
- Jorge Meré – 1. FC Köln – 2017–18, 2019–22
- Mikel Merino – Borussia Dortmund – 2016–17
- Juan Miranda – Schalke 04 – 2019–20
- David Montero – Eintracht Frankfurt – 2003–04
- **Fabio Moreno Fell** – **Mainz 05** – 2025–
- Mateu Morey – Borussia Dortmund – 2019–21, 2023–24
- Hugo Novoa – RB Leipzig – 2021–23
- Álvaro Odriozola – Bayern Munich – 2019–20
- Dani Olmo – RB Leipzig – 2019–24
- Cameron Puertas – Werder Bremen – 2025–26
- Rafa – SC Paderborn – 2014–15
- Raúl – Schalke 04 – 2010–12
- Pepe Reina – Bayern Munich – 2014–15
- Marc Roca – Bayern Munich – 2020–22
- José Rodríguez – Mainz 05 – 2016–17
- Oriol Romeu – VfB Stuttgart – 2014–15
- Rubén – Borussia M'gladbach – 2003–04
- Thiago – Bayern Munich – 2013–20
- Marc Torrejón – SC Freiburg – 2014–15, 2016–17
- Lucas Torró – Eintracht Frankfurt – 2018–20
- Jesús Vallejo – Eintracht Frankfurt – 2016–17
- **Lucas Vázquez** – **Bayer Leverkusen** – 2025–
- Bryan Zaragoza – Bayern Munich – 2023–24

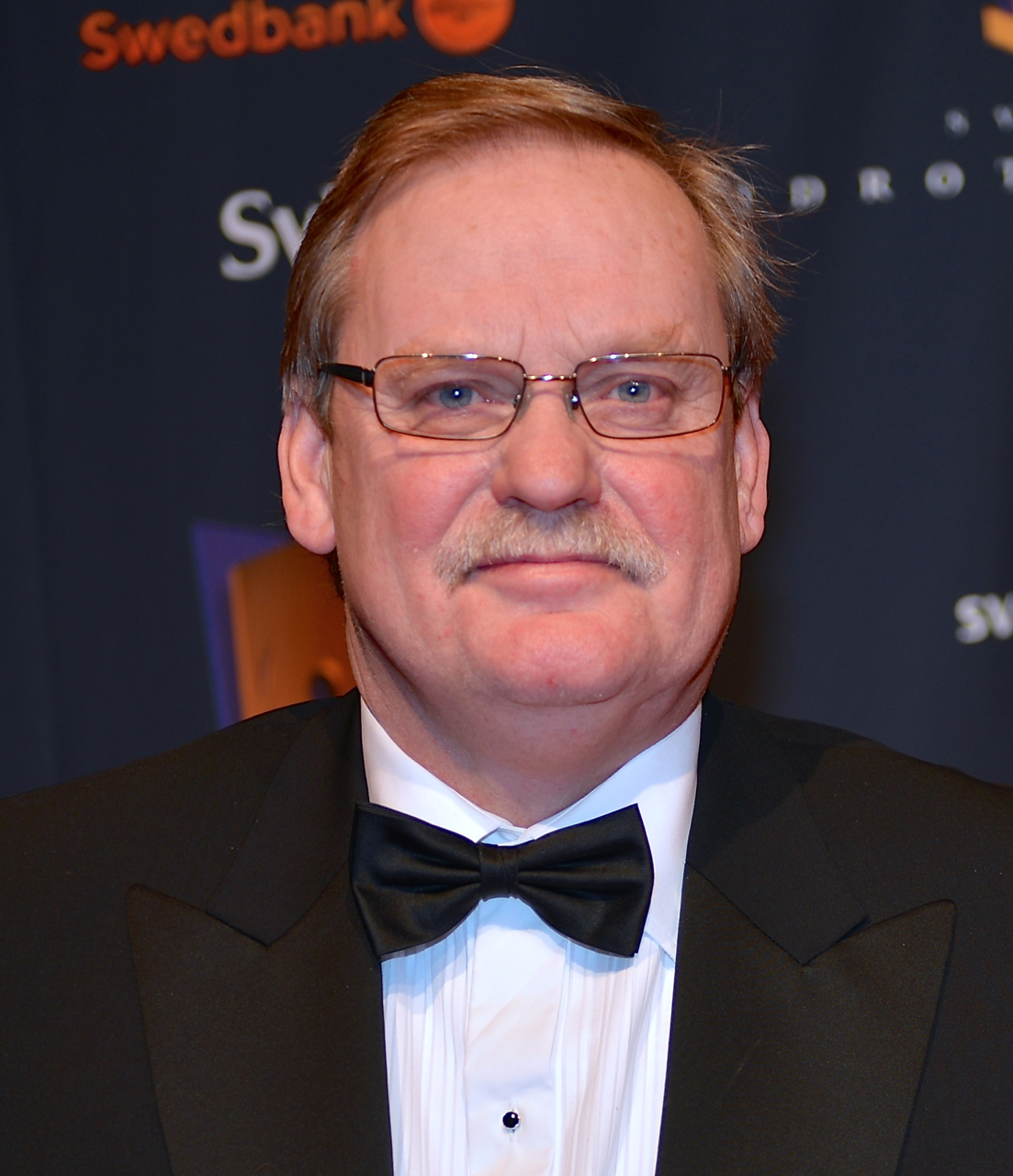
Ronnie Hellström has played 266 Bundesliga matches as goalkeeper for 1.FC Kaiserslautern.

=== Sweden ===
- Erik Ahlstrand – FC St. Pauli – 2024–26
- Marcus Allbäck – Hansa Rostock – 2004–05
- Björn Andersson – Bayern Munich – 1974–77
- Christoffer Andersson – Hannover 96 – 2006–07
- Patrik Andersson – Borussia M'gladbach, Bayern Munich – 1993–2001
- Sebastian Andersson – Union Berlin, 1. FC Köln – 2019–23
- Thomas Andersson – VfL Bochum – 1982–83
- **Love Arrhov** – **Eintracht Frankfurt** – 2025–
- Magnus Arvidsson – Hansa Rostock – 1999–2005
- Sanny Åslund – Werder Bremen – 1975–76
- Ludwig Augustinsson – Werder Bremen – 2017–21
- Denni Avdić – Werder Bremen – 2010–11
- Nabil Bahoui – Hamburger SV – 2015–17
- Pierre Bengtsson – Mainz 05 – 2014–16
- Rasmus Bengtsson – Hertha BSC – 2009–10
- Marcus Berg – Hamburger SV – 2009–10, 2011–13
- Alexander Bernhardsson – Holstein Kiel – 2024–25
- **Hugo Bolin** – **Borussia M'gladbach** – 2025–
- Hasse Borg – Eintracht Braunschweig – 1977–80, 1981–83
- Matias Concha – VfL Bochum – 2007–10
- Dan Corneliusson – VfB Stuttgart – 1983–84
- Martin Dahlin – Borussia M'gladbach, Hamburger SV – 1991–97, 1998–99
- Albin Ekdal – Hamburger SV – 2015–18
- Johnny Ekström – Bayern Munich, Dynamo Dresden, Eintracht Frankfurt – 1988–89, 1994–96
- Jan Eriksson – 1. FC Kaiserslautern – 1992–94
- Alexander Farnerud – VfB Stuttgart – 2006–08
- Emil Forsberg – RB Leipzig – 2016–24
- Christer Fursth – 1. FC Köln – 1996–97
- Tobias Grahn – Hertha BSC – 2007–08
- Lars Granström – Karlsruher SC – 1966–67
- Jiloan Hamad – TSG Hoffenheim – 2013–16
- Ronnie Hellström – 1. FC Kaiserslautern – 1974–84
- Hans Holmqvist – Fortuna Düsseldorf – 1984–86
- Branimir Hrgota – Borussia M'gladbach, Eintracht Frankfurt, Greuther Fürth – 2012–19, 2021–22
- Alexander Isak – Borussia Dortmund – 2017–18
- Mikael Ishak – 1. FC Köln, 1. FC Nürnberg – 2011–12, 2018–19
- Thomas Isherwood – Darmstadt 98 – 2023–24
- Andreas Jakobsson – Hansa Rostock – 2000–03
- Andreas Johansson – VfL Bochum – 2009–10
- Carl Johansson – Holstein Kiel – 2024–25
- Nils-Eric Johansson – Bayern Munich, 1. FC Nürnberg – 1998–99, 2001–02
- Rasmus Jönsson – VfL Wolfsburg – 2011–13
- Isaac Kiese Thelin – Bayer Leverkusen – 2018–19
- Niclas Kindvall – Hamburger SV – 1994–96
- Jonah Kusi-Asare – Bayern Munich – 2024–26
- Marcus Lantz – Hansa Rostock – 1999–2005
- Bo Larsson – VfB Stuttgart – 1966–69
- Hugo Larsson – Eintracht Frankfurt – 2023–26
- Jordan Larsson – Schalke 04 – 2022–23
- Lennart Larsson – Schalke 04 – 1977–79
- **Isac Lidberg** – **Borussia M'gladbach** – 2026–
- Mats Lilienberg – 1860 Munich – 1994–95
- Andreas Linde – Greuther Fürth – 2021–22
- Roger Ljung – MSV Duisburg – 1994–95
- Teddy Lučić – Bayer Leverkusen – 2003–04
- Benno Magnusson – 1. FC Kaiserslautern, Hertha BSC – 1973–76
- Roger Magnusson – 1. FC Köln – 1966–67
- Jan Mattsson – Fortuna Düsseldorf, Bayer Uerdingen – 1975–77, 1979–81
- Alexander Milošević – Hannover 96, Darmstadt 98 – 2015–17
- Joakim Nilsson – Arminia Bielefeld – 2020–22
- Per Nilsson – TSG Hoffenheim, 1. FC Nürnberg – 2008–14
- Torbjörn Nilsson – 1. FC Kaiserslautern – 1982–84
- Billy Ohlsson – Arminia Bielefeld – 1978–79
- Jan Olsson – VfB Stuttgart – 1969–71
- Matteo Pérez Vinlöf – Bayern Munich – 2024–25
- Joakim Persson – Hansa Rostock – 2002–05
- Jörgen Pettersson – Borussia M'gladbach, 1. FC Kaiserslautern – 1995–2002
- Rade Prica – Hansa Rostock – 2002–05
- Robert Prytz – Bayer Uerdingen – 1987–88
- Robin Quaison – Mainz 05 – 2016–21
- Jonny Rödlund – Energie Cottbus – 2000–01
- Markus Rosenberg – Werder Bremen – 2006–10, 2011–12
- Roland Sandberg – 1. FC Kaiserslautern – 1973–77
- Amin Sarr – VfL Wolfsburg – 2023–24
- Thomas Sjöberg – Karlsruher SC – 1976–77
- Niklas Skoog – MSV Duisburg, 1. FC Nürnberg – 1996–99
- Eric Smith – FC St. Pauli – 2024–26
- Fredrik Stenman – Bayer Leverkusen – 2005–07
- Mattias Svanberg – VfL Wolfsburg – 2022–26
- **Daniel Svensson** – **Borussia Dortmund** – 2024–
- Jan Svensson – Eintracht Frankfurt – 1983–86
- Conny Torstensson – Bayern Munich – 1973–77
- Sharbel Touma – Borussia M'gladbach – 2008–09
- Oscar Vilhelmsson – Darmstadt 98 – 2023–24
- Benny Wendt – 1. FC Köln, Tennis Borussia Berlin, 1. FC Kaiserslautern – 1975–81
- Oscar Wendt – Borussia M'gladbach – 2011–21
- Peter Wibrån – Hansa Rostock – 1998–2003

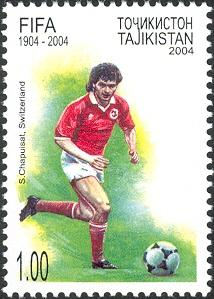
Stéphane Chapuisat is the 5th best foreign goalscorer in Bundesliga history (106 goals).

=== Switzerland ===
- Orhan Ademi – Eintracht Braunschweig – 2013–14
- **Michel Aebischer** – **Union Berlin** – 2026–
- François Affolter – Werder Bremen – 2011–12
- Albian Ajeti – FC Augsburg – 2015–16
- Manuel Akanji – Borussia Dortmund – 2017–22
- Anton Allemann – 1. FC Nürnberg – 1964–66
- Aurèle Amenda – Eintracht Frankfurt – 2024–26
- Martin Angha – 1. FC Nürnberg – 2013–14
- Tranquillo Barnetta – Hannover 96, Bayer Leverkusen, Schalke 04, Eintracht Frankfurt – 2004–15
- Valon Behrami – Hamburger SV – 2014–15
- Diego Benaglio – VfL Wolfsburg – 2007–17
- Steve von Bergen – Hertha BSC – 2007–10
- Bruno Berner – SC Freiburg – 2003–05
- René Botteron – 1. FC Köln, 1. FC Nürnberg – 1980–83
- Cédric Brunner – Arminia Bielefeld, Schalke 04 – 2020–23
- Nishan Burkart – SC Freiburg – 2020–21
- Roman Bürki – SC Freiburg, Borussia Dortmund – 2014–22
- Ricardo Cabanas – 1. FC Köln – 2005–06
- Mario Cantaluppi – 1. FC Nürnberg – 2004–06
- Stéphane Chapuisat – Bayer Uerdingen, Borussia Dortmund – 1990–99
- Fabio Coltorti – RB Leipzig – 2016–17
- Saulo Decarli – VfL Bochum – 2021–22
- David Degen – Borussia M'gladbach – 2006–07
- Philipp Degen – Borussia Dortmund, VfB Stuttgart – 2005–08, 2010–11
- Eren Derdiyok – Bayer Leverkusen, TSG Hoffenheim – 2009–14
- Johan Djourou – Hannover 96, Hamburger SV – 2012–17
- Josip Drmić – 1. FC Nürnberg, Bayer Leverkusen, Borussia M'gladbach, Hamburger SV – 2013–18
- Mario Eggimann – Karlsruher SC, Hannover 96 – 2007–13
- André Egli – Borussia Dortmund – 1984–85
- Rudolf Elsener – Eintracht Frankfurt – 1978–79
- Nico Elvedi – Borussia M'gladbach – 2015–26
- Breel Embolo – Schalke 04, Borussia M'gladbach – 2016–22
- Beg Ferati – SC Freiburg – 2011–12
- Edimilson Fernandes – Mainz 05, Arminia Bielefeld – 2019–24
- Gélson Fernandes – SC Freiburg, Eintracht Frankfurt – 2013–14, 2017–20
- Sébastien Fournier – VfB Stuttgart – 1996–97
- Alexander Frei – Borussia Dortmund – 2006–09
- Fabian Frei – Mainz 05 – 2015–18
- Michael Frey – Schalke 04 – 2022–23
- Ulisses Garcia – Werder Bremen – 2015–18
- **Adrian Gantenbein** – **Schalke 04** – 2026–
- Mario Gavranović – Schalke 04, Mainz 05 – 2009–12
- Anto Grgić – VfB Stuttgart – 2017–18
- Christian Gross – VfL Bochum – 1980–82
- Daniel Gygax – 1. FC Nürnberg – 2009–10
- Stéphane Henchoz – Hamburger SV – 1995–97
- Andreas Hilfiker – 1. FC Nürnberg – 1998–99
- Andreas Hirzel – Hamburger SV – 2015–16
- Marwin Hitz – VfL Wolfsburg, FC Augsburg, Borussia Dortmund – 2009–12, 2013–22
- Benjamin Huggel – Eintracht Frankfurt – 2005–07
- **Kastriot Imeri** – **Union Berlin** – 2026–
- **Cedric Itten** – Greuther Fürth, **Werder Bremen** – 2021–22, 2026–
- **Luca Jaquez** – **VfB Stuttgart** – 2024–
- Vasilije Janjičić – Hamburger SV – 2016–18
- Nassim Ben Khalifa – 1. FC Nürnberg – 2010–11
- Timm Klose – 1. FC Nürnberg, VfL Wolfsburg – 2011–16
- Adrian Knup – VfB Stuttgart, Karlsruher SC – 1992–96
- **Gregor Kobel** – TSG Hoffenheim, FC Augsburg, VfB Stuttgart, **Borussia Dortmund** – 2018–19, 2020–
- Oumar Kondé – SC Freiburg – 1999–2002, 2003–05
- Adrian Kunz – Werder Bremen – 1997–99
- Michael Lang – Borussia M'gladbach, Werder Bremen – 2018–20
- Stephan Lichtsteiner – FC Augsburg – 2019–20
- Noah Loosli – VfL Bochum – 2023–24
- Fabian Lustenberger – Hertha BSC – 2007–10, 2011–12, 2013–19
- Ludovic Magnin – Werder Bremen, VfB Stuttgart – 2001–10
- Johan Manzambi – SC Freiburg – 2024–26
- Kevin Mbabu – VfL Wolfsburg, FC Augsburg – 2019–22, 2023–24
- Admir Mehmedi – SC Freiburg, Bayer Leverkusen, VfL Wolfsburg – 2013–22
- Rémo Meyer – 1860 Munich – 2002–04
- **Miro Muheim** – **Hamburger SV** – 2025–
- Kurt Müller – Hertha BSC – 1972–75
- Yvon Mvogo – RB Leipzig – 2017–20
- Markus Neumayr – MSV Duisburg 2007–08
- Adrian Nikçi – Hannover 96 – 2012–13
- Blaise Nkufo – Hannover 96 – 2002–03
- **Bruno Ogbus** – **SC Freiburg** – 2024–
- Jonas Omlin – Borussia M'gladbach – 2022–25
- David Pallas – VfL Bochum – 2006–07
- **Fabian Rieder** – **VfB Stuttgart** – 2024–
- Francisco Rodríguez – VfL Wolfsburg – 2015–16
- Ricardo Rodriguez – VfL Wolfsburg – 2011–17

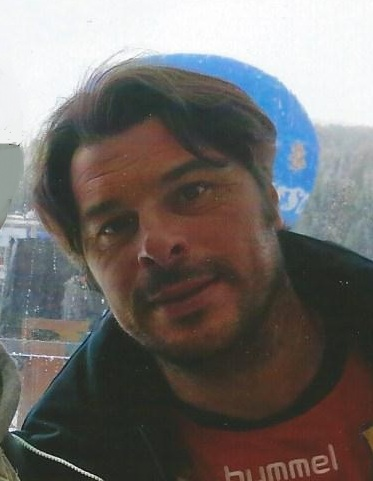
Central midfielder Ciriaco Sforza signed for Kaiserslautern thrice and Bayern München twice (265 Bundesliga matches).

- Fabian Schär – TSG Hoffenheim – 2015–17
- **Isaac Schmidt** – **Werder Bremen** – 2025–
- **Joël Schmied** – **1. FC Köln** – 2025–
- Pirmin Schwegler – Bayer Leverkusen, Eintracht Frankfurt, TSG Hoffenheim, Hannover 96 – 2006–11, 2012–19
- Haris Seferovic – Eintracht Frankfurt – 2014–17
- Daniel Sereinig – SC Freiburg – 2010–11
- Vincent Sierro – SC Freiburg – 2017–18
- Ciriaco Sforza – 1. FC Kaiserslautern, Bayern Munich – 1993–96, 1997–2003, 2004–06
- Xherdan Shaqiri – Bayern Munich – 2012–15
- Yann Sommer – Borussia M'gladbach, Bayern Munich – 2014–23
- Djibril Sow – Borussia M'gladbach, Eintracht Frankfurt – 2016–17, 2019–23
- Christoph Spycher – Eintracht Frankfurt – 2005–10
- Renato Steffen – VfL Wolfsburg – 2017–22
- **Leonidas Stergiou** – **VfB Stuttgart** – 2023–
- Jörg Stiel – Borussia M'gladbach – 2001–04
- Valentin Stocker – Hertha BSC – 2014–18
- Filip Stojilković – Darmstadt 98 – 2023–24
- Marco Streller – VfB Stuttgart, 1. FC Köln – 2003–07
- Alain Sutter – 1. FC Nürnberg, Bayern Munich, SC Freiburg – 1993–97
- Shani Tarashaj – Eintracht Frankfurt – 2016–17
- **Rouven Tarnutzer** – **SC Freiburg** – 2025–
- Ruben Vargas – FC Augsburg – 2019–25
- Marco Walker – 1860 Munich – 1996–98
- Raphaël Wicky – Werder Bremen, Hamburger SV – 1997–2007
- **Silvan Widmer** – **Mainz 05** – 2021–
- Rolf Wüthrich – 1. FC Nürnberg – 1964–65
- Granit Xhaka – Borussia M'gladbach, Bayer Leverkusen – 2012–16, 2023–25
- Hakan Yakin – VfB Stuttgart – 2004–05
- Murat Yakin – VfB Stuttgart, 1. FC Kaiserslautern – 1997–98, 2000–01
- Denis Zakaria – Borussia M'gladbach – 2017–22
- Marc Zellweger – 1. FC Köln – 2001–02
- Andi Zeqiri – FC Augsburg – 2021–22
- **Cédric Zesiger** – VfL Wolfsburg, **FC Augsburg** – 2023–
- Reto Ziegler – Hamburger SV – 2005–06
- Steven Zuber – TSG Hoffenheim, VfB Stuttgart, Eintracht Frankfurt – 2014–21
- Pascal Zuberbühler – Bayer Leverkusen – 2000–01

=== Turkey ===
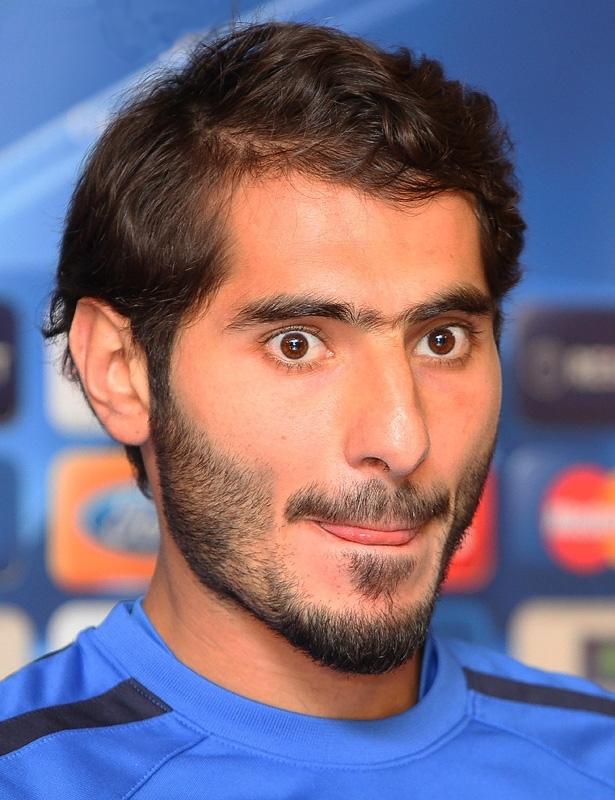
Gelsenkirchen native Halil Altıntop is the fifth-most capped foreign player in Bundesliga history (as of 2026).

- Mehmet Akgün – Borussia Dortmund – 2004–05, 2007–08
- Fatih Akyel – VfL Bochum – 2004–05
- Erhan Albayrak – Werder Bremen, Arminia Bielefeld – 1995–96, 2002–03
- Batuhan Altıntaş – Hamburger SV – 2015–16
- Halil Altıntop – 1. FC Kaiserslautern, Schalke 04, Eintracht Frankfurt, FC Augsburg – 2003–11, 2013–17
- Hamit Altıntop – Schalke 04, Bayern Munich, Darmstadt 98 – 2003–11, 2016–17
- Özcan Arkoç – Hamburger SV – 1967–74
- Çağdaş Atan – Energie Cottbus – 2008–09
- Okan Aydın – Bayer Leverkusen – 2012–13
- Kaan Ayhan – Schalke 04, Eintracht Frankfurt, Fortuna Düsseldorf – 2013–16, 2018–20
- **Mertcan Ayhan** – **Schalke 04** – 2026–
- Onur Ayık – Werder Bremen – 2009–11
- Deniz Barış – FC St. Pauli – 2001–02
- Yıldıray Baştürk – VfL Bochum, Bayer Leverkusen, Hertha BSC, VfB Stuttgart – 1997–99, 2000–10
- Ömer Beyaz – VfB Stuttgart – 2021–22
- Ferhat Bıkmaz – Hannover 96 – 2007–08
- Erol Bulut – Eintracht Frankfurt – 1999–2001
- Onur Bulut – SC Freiburg – 2016–18
- **Livan Burcu** – **Union Berlin** – 2025–
- Hakan Çalhanoğlu – Hamburger SV, Bayer Leverkusen – 2013–17
- Mahmut Çalışkan – 1. FC Köln – 1992–93
- Nizamettin Çalışkan – Borussia Dortmund – 2005–06
- Tolcay Ciğerci – Hamburger SV – 2014–15
- Tolga Ciğerci – VfL Wolfsburg, Borussia M'gladbach, Hertha BSC – 2010–16
- Ümit Davala – Werder Bremen – 2003–06
- Ersan Doğu – Werder Bremen – 1995–96
- Mehmet Ekici – 1. FC Nürnberg, Werder Bremen – 2010–14
- Mevlüt Erdinç – Hannover 96 – 2015–16
- Berkant Göktan – Borussia M'gladbach, Bayern Munich, Arminia Bielefeld, 1. FC Kaiserslautern – 1998–2001, 2005–06
- Ceyhun Gülselam – Hannover 96 – 2014–16
- Neşat Gülünoğlu – VfL Bochum – 1996–99
- Özkan Gümüş – Hamburger SV – 1997–98
- Ali Güneş – SC Freiburg – 1998–2000
- Sercan Güvenışık – MSV Duisburg – 1999–2000
- Burak Ince – Arminia Bielefeld – 2021–22
- Uğur İnceman – FC St. Pauli – 2001–02
- **Ozan Kabak** – VfB Stuttgart, Schalke 04, **TSG Hoffenheim** – 2018–21, 2022–
- **Atakan Karazor** – **VfB Stuttgart** – 2020–
- **Mahmut Küçükşahin** – **FC Augsburg** – 2023–
- Deniz Kadah – Hannover 96 – 2012–14
- Sinan Kaloğlu – VfL Bochum – 2008–09
- Burak Kaplan – Bayer Leverkusen – 2009–10
- Kenan Karaman – TSG Hoffenheim, Hannover 96, Fortuna Düsseldorf, Schalke 04 – 2013–16, 2017–20, 2022–23
- Burhanettin Kaymak – Eintracht Frankfurt – 1995–96, 1998–99
- Erdal Keser – Borussia Dortmund – 1980–84, 1986–87

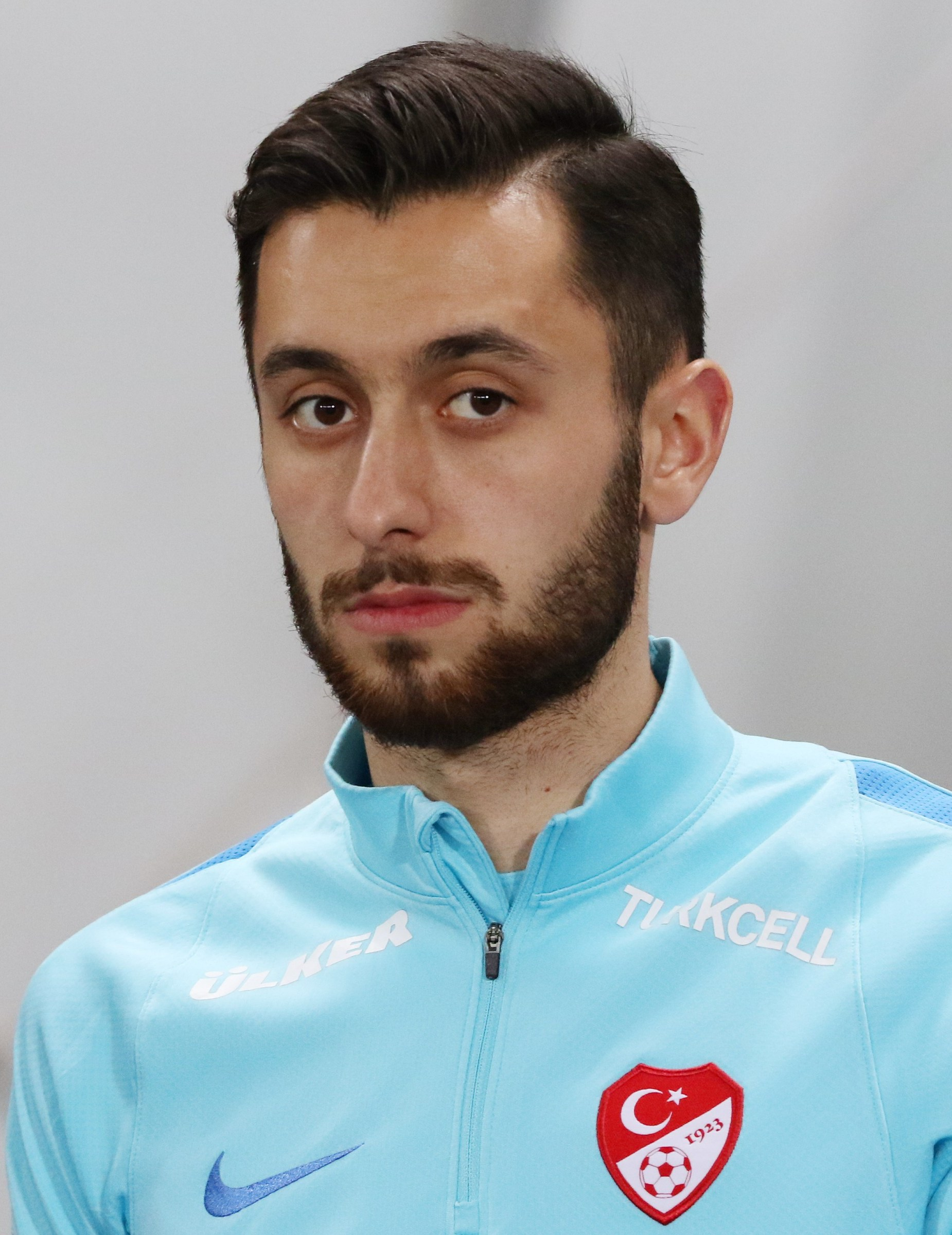
Yunus Mallı played in the Bundesliga for eleven years.

- Ender Konca – Eintracht Frankfurt – 1971–73
- Oktay Kuday – Karlsruher SC – 1997–98
- **Hasan Kuruçay** – **Schalke 04** – 2026–
- Ahmed Kutucu – Schalke 04 – 2018–21
- Yunus Mallı – Mainz 05, VfL Wolfsburg, Union Berlin – 2011–21
- Hami Mandıralı – Schalke 04 – 1998–99
- Ersen Martin – 1. FC Nürnberg – 1998–99
- Emre Mor – Borussia Dortmund – 2016–17
- **Deniz Ofli** – **Bayern Munich** – 2025–
- **Cenk Özkacar** – **1. FC Köln** – 2025–
- Erhan Önal – Bayern Munich – 1976–78
- Alpay Özalan – 1. FC Köln – 2005–06
- Ümit Özat – 1. FC Köln – 2008–09
- Berkay Özcan – VfB Stuttgart – 2017–19
- **Salih Özcan** – 1. FC Köln, **Borussia Dortmund** – 2016–18, 2020–
- Aykut Özer – Eintracht Frankfurt – 2012–13
- Abdulkadir Özgen – Alemannia Aachen – 2006–07
- Sezer Öztürk – Bayer Leverkusen, 1. FC Nürnberg – 2004–06
- Mahir Sağlık – VfL Wolfsburg, Karlsruher SC, SC Paderborn – 2008–09, 2014–15
- Olcay Şahan – 1. FC Kaiserslautern – 2011–12
- Kenan Şahin – Bayer Leverkusen – 2003–05

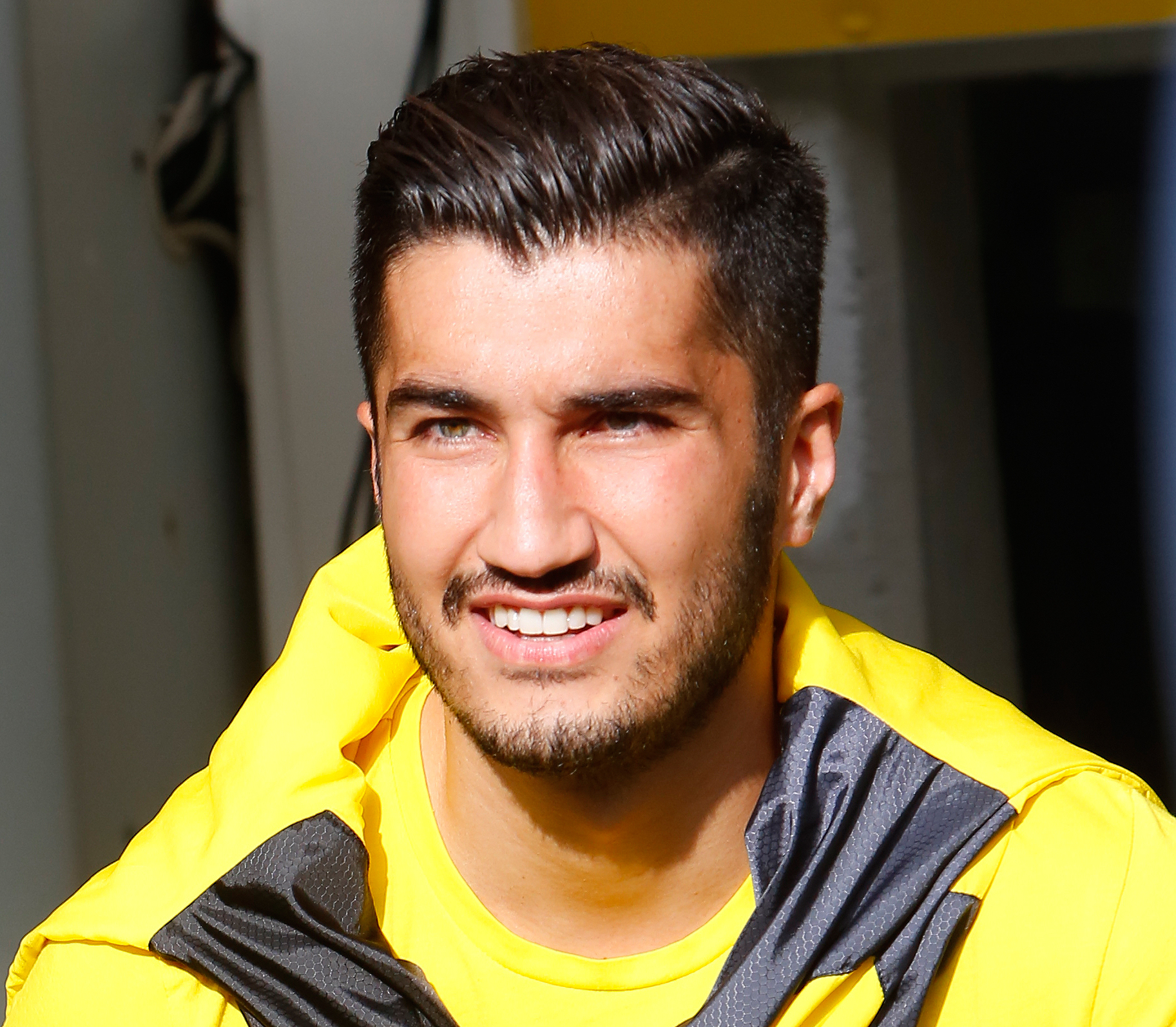
In 2005, Nuri Şahin was the youngest player capped in Bundesliga history (16 years, eleven months and one day).

- Nuri Şahin – Borussia Dortmund, Werder Bremen – 2005–07, 2008–11, 2012–20
- Tuncay – VfL Wolfsburg – 2010–11
- Sercan Sararer – Greuther Fürth, VfB Stuttgart – 2012–15
- Çağlar Söyüncü – SC Freiburg – 2016–18
- Aytaç Sulu – Darmstadt – 2015–17
- Sinan Tekerci – 1. FC Nürnberg – 2013–14
- Ömer Toprak – SC Freiburg, Bayer Leverkusen, Borussia Dortmund, Werder Bremen – 2009–21
- Gökhan Töre – Hamburger SV – 2011–12
- Tunay Torun – Hamburger SV, Hertha BSC, VfB Stuttgart – 2008–13
- Cenk Tosun – Eintracht Frankfurt – 2009–10
- İlyas Tüfekçi – VfB Stuttgart, Schalke 04 – 1980–83
- Volkan Ünlü – Schalke 04 – 2003–04
- Aykut Ünyazıcı – Eintracht Braunschweig – 1963–65
- **Can Uzun** – **Eintracht Frankfurt** – 2024–
- Ahmet Usman – FC St. Pauli – 1996–97
- Soner Uysal – Hamburger SV – 1997–98, 1999–2000
- Engin Verel – Hertha BSC – 1979–80
- Hasan Vural – Hertha BSC – 1997–98
- Timur Yanyalı – 1860 Munich – 1994–95
- **Erencan Yardımcı** – **TSG Hoffenheim** – 2024–
- Zafer Yelen – Hansa Rostock – 2007–08
- **Berkay Yılmaz** – **Freiburg** – 2026–
- Selçuk Yula – Blau-Weiß 90 Berlin – 1986–87

=== Ukraine ===
Until 1991 part of Soviet Union, from 1991 to 1992 part of CIS

- Ihor Belanov – Borussia M'gladbach – 1989–91
- **Dmytro Bohdanov** – **Union Berlin** – 2025–
- Oleksiy Byelik – VfL Bochum – 2007–08
- Serhiy Dikhtiar – Schalke 04 – 1993–96
- Artem Fedetskyi – Darmstadt 98 – 2016–17
- **Yukhym Konoplya** – **Borussia M'gladbach** – 2026–
- Yevhen Konoplyanka – Schalke 04 – 2016–19
- Dmytro Kovalenko – FC St. Pauli – 2001–02
- Artem Kravets – VfB Stuttgart – 2015–16
- Volodymyr Lyutyi – MSV Duisburg, VfL Bochum – 1991–93
- Yuriy Maksymov – Werder Bremen – 1997–2001
- Denys Oliynyk – Darmstadt 98 – 2016–17
- Ivan Ordets – VfL Bochum – 2022–25
- Andriy Polunin – 1. FC Nürnberg – 1998–99
- Yevhen Shakhov – 1. FC Kaiserslautern – 1989–90
- Viktor Skrypnyk – Werder Bremen – 1996–2004
- Andriy Sydelnykov – Wattenscheid 09 – 1991–92
- Borys Tashchy – VfB Stuttgart – 2015–16
- Anatoliy Tymoshchuk – Bayern Munich – 2009–13
- Andriy Voronin – Borussia M'gladbach, 1. FC Köln, Bayer Leverkusen, Hertha BSC, Fortuna Düsseldorf – 1997–98, 2003–07, 2008–09, 2012–13
- Vladlen Yurchenko – Bayer Leverkusen – 2014–17
- Andriy Yarmolenko – Borussia Dortmund – 2017–18

=== Wales ===
- Ethan Ampadu – RB Leipzig – 2019–20
- Mark Hughes – Bayern Munich – 1987–88
- Rabbi Matondo – Schalke 04 – 2018–21
- Fin Stevens – FC St. Pauli – 2024–26
- Dean Thomas – Fortuna Düsseldorf – 1985–87
- Wayne Thomas – Bayer Uerdingen, Hannover 96 – 1983–86, 1987–88

== CONMEBOL ==
=== Argentina ===
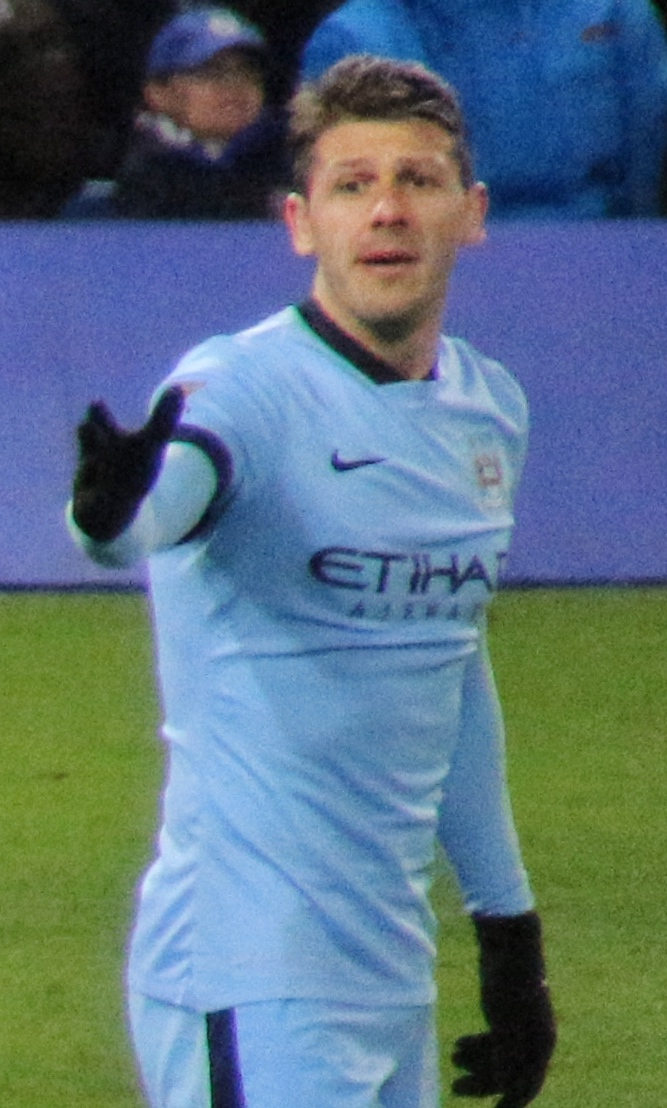
Martin Demichelis, topscorers in 2003-11

- David Abraham – TSG Hoffenheim, Eintracht Frankfurt – 2012–21
- Oscar Ahumada – VfL Wolfsburg – 2004–05
- Lucas Alario – Bayer Leverkusen, Eintracht Frankfurt – 2017–23
- Aarón Anselmino – Borussia Dortmund – 2025–26
- Santiago Ascacíbar – VfB Stuttgart, Hertha BSC – 2017–22
- Fernando Ávalos – MSV Duisburg – 2007–08
- Leonardo Balerdi – Borussia Dortmund – 2019–20
- José Basualdo – VfB Stuttgart – 1989–91
- Emiliano Buendía – Bayer Leverkusen – 2024–25
- Sergio Bustos – 1. FC Nürnberg – 1992–94
- **Nicolás Capaldo** – **Hamburger SV** – 2025–
- Rodolfo Cardoso – FC Homburg, SC Freiburg, Werder Bremen, Hamburger SV – 1989–90, 1993–98, 1999–2004
- Marcelo Carracedo – Fortuna Düsseldorf – 1989–92
- Matías Cenci – FC St. Pauli – 2001–02
- Emanuel Centurión – VfB Stuttgart – 2003–05
- Leandro Cufré – Hertha BSC – 2008–09
- Andrés D'Alessandro – VfL Wolfsburg – 2003–06
- Pablo de Blasis – Mainz 05 – 2014–19
- Martín Demichelis – Bayern Munich – 2003–11
- Franco Di Santo – Werder Bremen, Schalke 04 – 2013–19
- Christian Dollberg – 1. FC Köln – 1995–96
- Claudio Echeverri – Bayer Leverkusen – 2025–26
- **Equi Fernández** – **Bayer Leverkusen** – 2025–
- Juan Fernández – Borussia Dortmund – 2002–04
- Santiago García – Werder Bremen – 2013–17
- Christian Giménez – Hertha BSC – 2006–07
- Nicolás González – VfB Stuttgart – 2018–19, 2020–21
- Emiliano Insúa – VfB Stuttgart – 2015–16, 2017–19
- Federico Insúa – Borussia M'gladbach – 2006–07
- Diego Klimowicz – VfL Wolfsburg, Borussia Dortmund, VfL Bochum – 2001–10
- Cristian Ledesma – Hamburger SV – 2002–03
- Sergio Maciel – FC Homburg – 1989–90
- **Julián Malatini** – **Werder Bremen** – 2023–
- Pato Margetic – Borussia Dortmund – 1988–89
- Aníbal Matellán – Schalke 04 – 2001–04
- **Facundo Medina** – **Bayer Leverkusen** – 2026–
- Juan Carlos Menseguez – VfL Wolfsburg – 2003–07
- Horacio Neumann – 1. FC Köln – 1972–74
- Exequiel Palacios – Bayer Leverkusen – 2019–26
- Javier Pinola – 1. FC Nürnberg – 2005–08, 2009–14
- Diego Placente – Bayer Leverkusen – 2000–05
- Pablo Quatrocchi – VfL Wolfsburg – 2002–04
- Facundo Quiroga – VfL Wolfsburg – 2004–08
- Leonardo Rodríguez – Borussia Dortmund – 1993–94
- Bernardo Romeo – Hamburger SV – 2001–05
- Christian Rudzki – Hannover 96 – 1972–73
- Alejo Sarco – Bayer Leverkusen, Borussia M'gladbach – 2025–26
- Juan Pablo Sorín – Hamburger SV – 2006–08
- José Sosa – Bayern Munich – 2007–10
- Sergio Zárate – 1. FC Nürnberg, Hamburger SV – 1990–92, 1993–95
- Franco Zuculini – TSG Hoffenheim – 2009–10

=== Bolivia ===
- Marcelo Moreno – Werder Bremen – 2009–10

=== Brazil ===
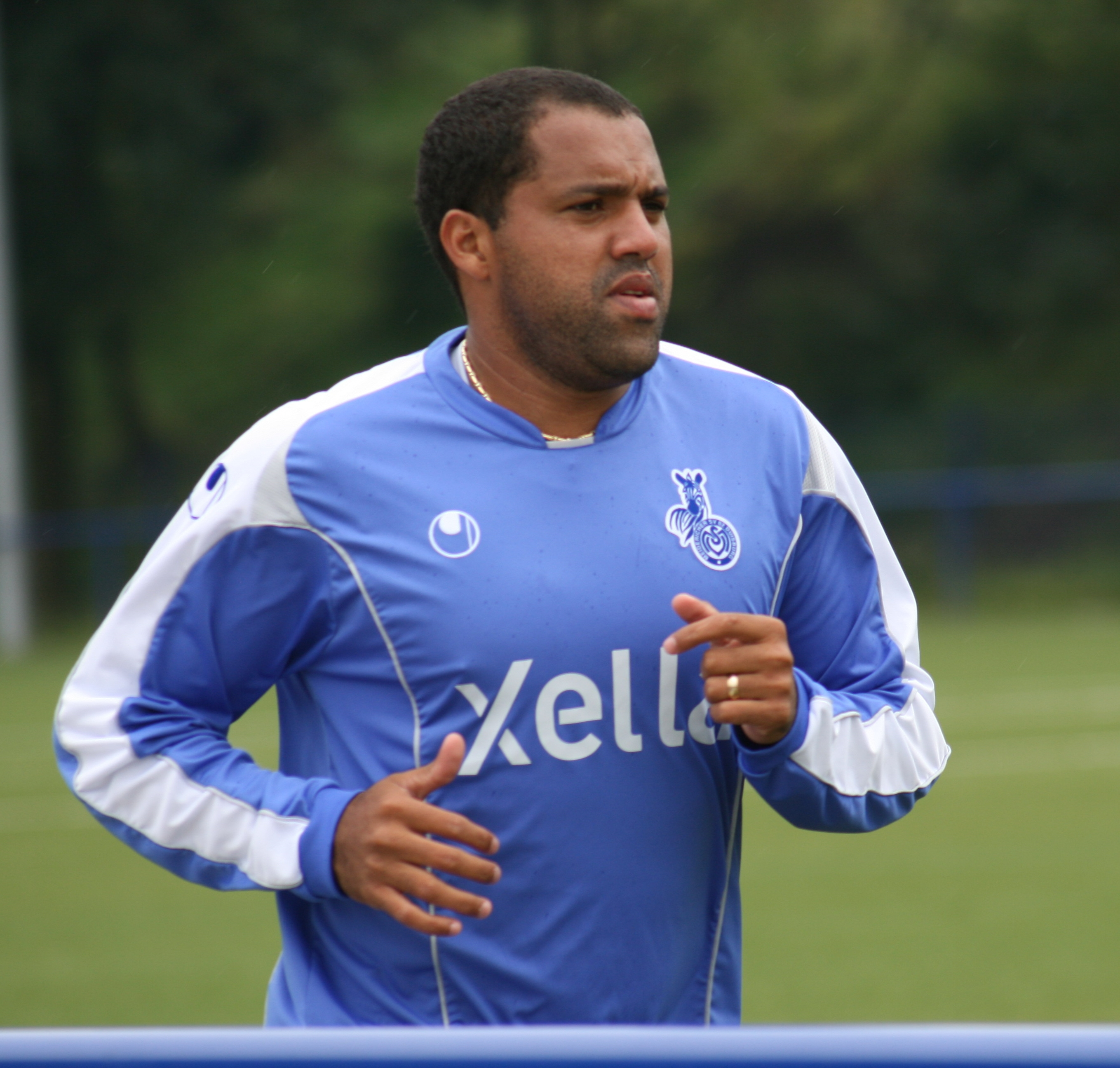
In 2004, Aílton was the first ever foreign player to be awarded Footballer of the Year (Germany).

- Abuda – VfL Wolfsburg – 2005–06
- Adhemar – VfB Stuttgart – 2000–02
- Adi – Energie Cottbus – 2008–09
- Aílton – Werder Bremen, Schalke 04, Hamburger SV, MSV Duisburg – 1998–2006, 2007–08
- Ailton – VfB Stuttgart – 2017–18
- Alcides – Schalke 04 – 2003–04
- **Arthur** – **Bayer Leverkusen** – 2023–
- Carlos Alberto – Werder Bremen – 2007–08
- Allan – Hertha BSC, Eintracht Frankfurt – 2016–17, 2018–19
- Alex Alves – Hertha BSC – 1999–2003
- Rodrigo Alvim – VfL Wolfsburg – 2008–09
- Márcio Amoroso – Borussia Dortmund – 2001–04
- Anderson – Borussia M'gladbach, Eintracht Frankfurt – 2010–11, 2012–15
- Andrezinho – 1. FC Köln – 2010–12
- Marcos António – 1. FC Nürnberg – 2012–13
- Arílson – 1. FC Kaiserslautern – 1995–96
- Athirson – Bayer Leverkusen – 2005–07
- Renato Augusto – Bayer Leverkusen – 2008–13
- Danilo Avelar – Schalke 04 – 2010–11
- Fernando Baiano – VfL Wolfsburg – 2003–04
- Júnior Baiano – Werder Bremen – 1995–96
- Michel Bastos – Schalke 04 – 2012–13
- Bernardo (Bernardo Fernandes da Silva) – Bayern Munich – 1991–92
- Bernardo (Bernardo Fernandes da Silva Junior) – RB Leipzig – 2016–18
- Marcelo Bordon – VfB Stuttgart, Schalke 04 – 1999–2010
- Márcio Borges – Arminia Bielefeld – 1999–2000, 2002–03, 2004–07
- Brasília – Energie Cottbus – 2001–02
- Breno – Bayern Munich, 1. FC Nürnberg – 2007–11
- Waldomir Pacheco Buca – Hamburger SV – 1979–80
- Júnior Caiçara – Schalke 04 – 2015–17
- Caio – Eintracht Frankfurt – 2007–11
- Caiuby – VfL Wolfsburg, FC Augsburg – 2008–09, 2014–19
- **Rômulo Cardoso** – **RB Leipzig** – 2025–
- **Maycon Cardozo** – **Bayern Munich** – 2025–
- Cauly – SC Paderborn – 2019–20
- César – Hertha BSC – 2009–10
- Júlio César – Borussia Dortmund, Werder Bremen – 1994–2000
- Chiquinho – Borussia M'gladbach – 1997–99
- Chris – Eintracht Frankfurt, VfL Wolfsburg – 2003–04, 2005–12
- Cícero – Hertha BSC, VfL Wolfsburg – 2008–11
- Cléber – Hamburger SV – 2014–17
- Flávio Conceição – Borussia Dortmund – 2003–04
- Douglas Costa – Bayern Munich – 2015–17, 2020–21
- Rodrigo Costa – 1860 Munich – 2002–04
- Philippe Coutinho – Bayern Munich – 2019–20
- Yan Couto – Borussia Dortmund – 2024–26
- Cris – Bayer Leverkusen – 2002–03
- Matheus Cunha – RB Leipzig, Hertha BSC – 2018–22
- Dante – Borussia M'gladbach, Bayern Munich, VfL Wolfsburg – 2008–16
- Dedê – Borussia Dortmund – 1998–2011
- Deyverson – 1. FC Köln – 2014–15
- Didi – VfB Stuttgart – 1999–2000
- Diego – Werder Bremen, VfL Wolfsburg – 2006–09, 2010–11, 2012–14
- Jean Carlos Dondé – Hamburger SV – 2004–05
- Dunga – VfB Stuttgart – 1993–95
- Edu – VfL Bochum, Mainz 05, Schalke 04, Greuther Fürth – 2003–05, 2006–07, 2009–13
- Carlos Eduardo – TSG Hoffenheim – 2008–10

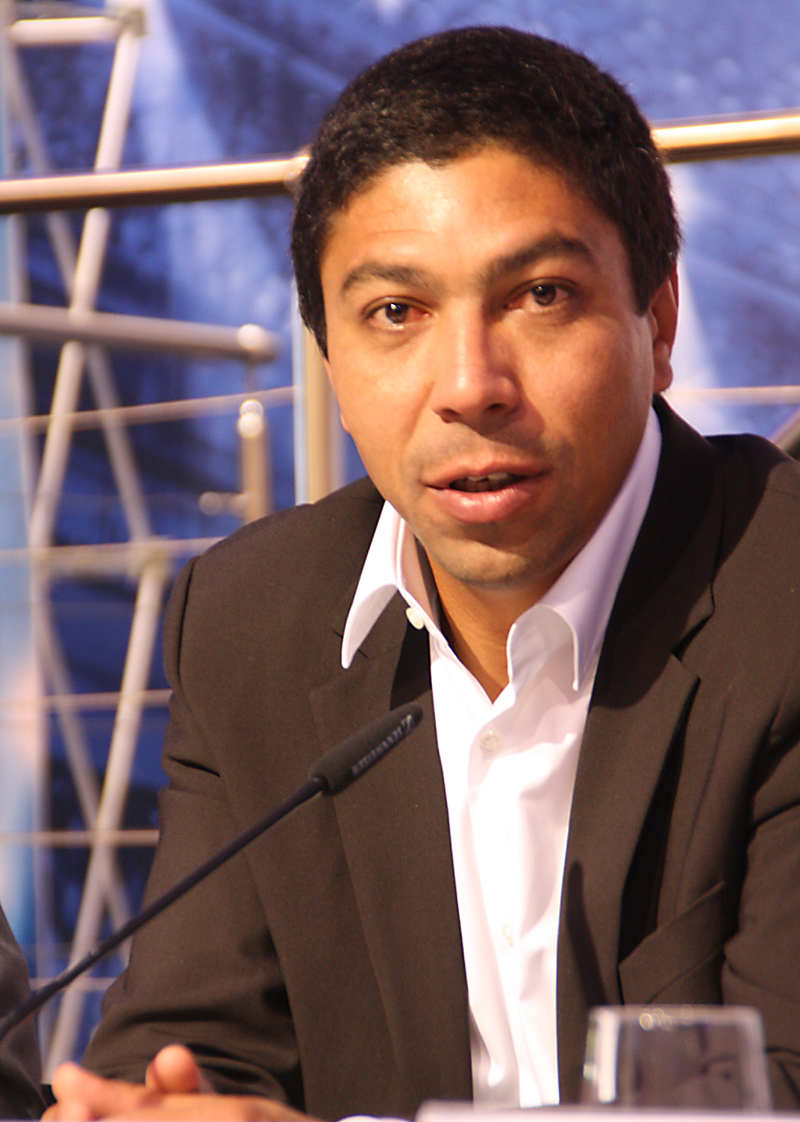
Giovane Élber, top goalscorer in 02–03

- Giovane Élber – VfB Stuttgart, Bayern Munich, Borussia M'gladbach – 1994–2004, 2005–06
- Élson – VfB Stuttgart, Hannover 96 – 2004–05, 2008–11
- Emerson – Bayer Leverkusen – 1997–2000
- Émerson Luiz Firmino – Hamburger SV, FC St. Pauli – 1991–92, 1996–97
- Luciano Emílio – 1. FC Köln – 1997–98
- Evanílson – Borussia Dortmund, 1. FC Köln – 1999–2006
- Ewerthon – Borussia Dortmund, VfB Stuttgart – 2001–05, 2007–08
- Ewerton– 1. FC Nürnberg – 2018–19
- Fabrício – TSG Hoffenheim – 2008–09
- Fagner – VfL Wolfsburg – 2012–13
- Felipe – Hannover 96 – 2012–13, 2014–16, 2017–19
- Roberto Firmino – TSG Hoffenheim – 2010–15
- Leandro Fonseca – SSV Ulm, Hannover 96 – 1999–2000, 2004–05
- França – Bayer Leverkusen – 2002–05
- Franklin – VfB Leipzig, Energie Cottbus – 1993–94, 2000–03
- Pedro Geromel – 1. FC Köln – 2008–12
- Gilberto – Hertha BSC – 2004–08
- Gláuber – 1. FC Nürnberg – 2005–08
- Gledson – Hansa Rostock – 2007–08
- Heurelho Gomes – TSG Hoffenheim – 2012–13

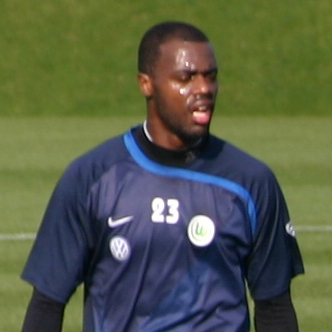
Grafite, top goalscorer in 08–09 and Footballer of the Year (Germany) in 2009

- Grafite – VfL Wolfsburg – 2007–11
- Luiz Gustavo – TSG Hoffenheim, Bayern Munich, VfL Wolfsburg – 2008–17
- Henrique – Bayer Leverkusen – 2008–09
- Bruno Henrique – VfL Wolfsburg – 2015–17
- Ramon Hubner – Bayer Leverkusen – 1995–96
- Iago – FC Augsburg – 2019–24
- João Victor – VfL Wolfsburg – 2019–21
- Joelinton – TSG Hoffenheim – 2015–16, 2018–19
- Jonathas – Hannover 96 – 2017–19
- Jorginho – Bayer Leverkusen, Bayern Munich – 1989–95
- Josué – VfL Wolfsburg – 2007–13
- Juan – Bayer Leverkusen – 2002–07
- Júnior – 1. FC Kaiserslautern, 1. FC Nürnberg – 1998–99, 2001–03
- Fábio Júnior – VfL Bochum – 2006–07
- Roque Júnior – Bayer Leverkusen, MSV Duisburg – 2004–08
- Kahê – Borussia M'gladbach – 2005–07
- Kaká – Hertha BSC – 2008–10
- Klauss – TSG Hoffenheim – 2020–21
- Kléber – Hannover 96 – 2003–04
- Leandro – Borussia Dortmund – 2002–04
- André Lima – Hertha BSC – 2007–08
- Lincoln – 1. FC Kaiserslautern, Schalke 04 – 2001–07
- Felipe Lopes – VfL Wolfsburg, VfB Stuttgart – 2011–13
- Lúcio (Lucimar Ferreira da Silva) – Bayer Leverkusen, Bayern Munich – 2000–09
- Lúcio (Lúcio Carlos Cajueiro Souza) – Hertha BSC – 2007–09
- Luizão – Hertha BSC – 2002–04
- Maicon – MSV Duisburg – 2007–08
- Maicosuel – TSG Hoffenheim – 2009–10
- Leonardo Manzi – FC St. Pauli – 1989–91, 1995–96
- Marcão – FC St. Pauli – 2001–02
- Marcelinho – Hertha BSC, VfL Wolfsburg – 2001–08
- Marcelo – Hannover 96 – 2013–16
- Luciano Martins – FC Homburg – 1987–88
- Maurides – FC St. Pauli – 2024–25
- Mazinho – Bayern Munich – 1991–95
- Mineiro – Hertha BSC, Schalke 04 – 2006–08, 2009–10
- Diego Morais – Hansa Rostock – 2007–08
- Naldo – Werder Bremen, VfL Wolfsburg, Schalke 04 – 2005–10, 2011–19
- Nando – Hamburger SV – 1989–92
- Vivaldo Nascimento – Eintracht Frankfurt – 2003–04
- Bruno Nazário – TSG Hoffenheim – 2013–14
- Nenê – Hertha BSC – 2002–03
- Gustavo Nery – Werder Bremen – 2004–05
- Thiago Neves – Hamburger SV – 2008–09
- Orestes – Hansa Rostock – 2007–08
- **Otávio** – **Eintracht Frankfurt** – 2026–
- Paulo Otávio – VfL Wolfsburg – 2019–23
- Paulinho – Bayer Leverkusen – 2018–20
- Matheus Pereira – 1. FC Nürnberg – 2018–19
- Lucas Piazon – Eintracht Frankfurt – 2014–15
- Marcelo Pletsch – Borussia M'gladbach, 1. FC Kaiserslautern – 2001–06
- Robson Ponte – Bayer Leverkusen, VfL Wolfsburg – 1999–2005
- **Kauã Prates** – **Borussia Dortmund** – 2026–
- Rafael – 1860 Munich – 2002–03
- Raffael – Hertha BSC, Schalke 04, Borussia M'gladbach – 2007–10, 2011–20
- Rafinha – Schalke 04, Bayern Munich – 2005–10, 2011–19
- André Ramalho – Bayer Leverkusen, Mainz 05 – 2015–18
- Ratinho – 1. FC Kaiserslautern – 1997–2003
- Reinier – Borussia Dortmund – 2020–22
- Rodnei – Hertha BSC, 1. FC Kaiserslautern – 2008–09, 2010–12
- Lucas Ribeiro – TSG Hoffenheim – 2019–20
- Rodrigo Chagas – Bayer Leverkusen – 1995–96
- Roger – FC Ingolstadt – 2015–17
- Rogério – VfL Wolfsburg – 2023–26
- Rômulo – Mainz 05 – 2005–06
- Ronny – Hertha BSC – 2011–12, 2013–16
- Felipe Santana – Borussia Dortmund, Schalke 04 – 2008–15
- Douglas Santos – Hamburger SV – 2016–18
- Fernando Santos – 1860 Munich, MSV Duisburg – 2003–04, 2007–08
- **Kauã Santos** – **Eintracht Frankfurt** – 2024–
- Léo Scienza – 1. FC Heidenheim – 2024–26
- Paulo Sérgio – Bayer Leverkusen, Bayern Munich – 1993–97, 1999–2002
- Sidney – Energie Cottbus – 2006–07

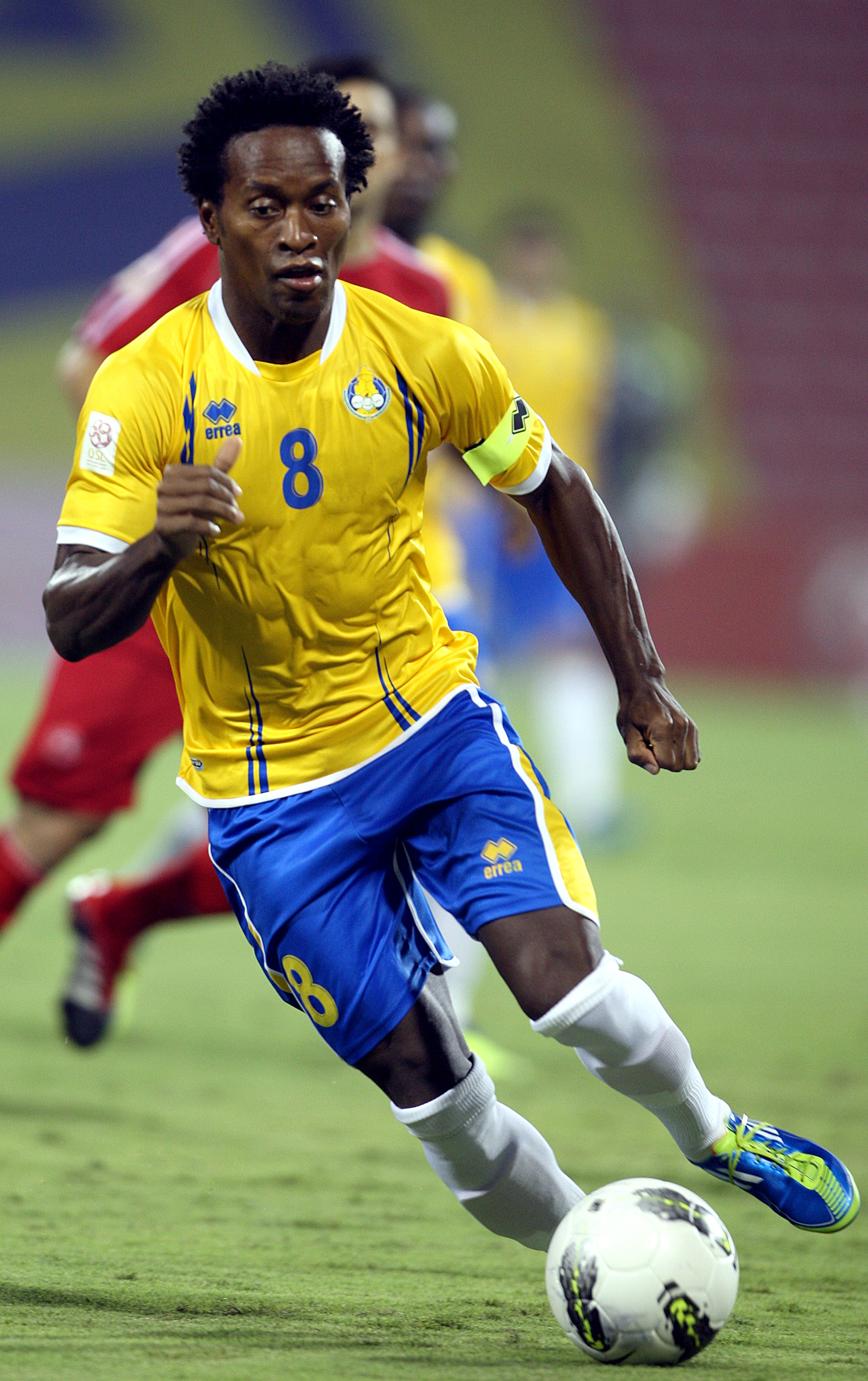
Zé Roberto has played 336 matches in Bundesliga.

- Alessandro da Silva – Eintracht Frankfurt – 1992–93
- Alex Silva – Hamburger SV – 2008–09
- Antonio da Silva – Mainz 05, VfB Stuttgart, Karlsruher SC, Borussia Dortmund – 2004–09, 2010–12
- Geovani Silva – Karlsruher SC – 1990–91
- Leandro da Silva – 1. FC Nürnberg – 2004–05
- Vragel da Silva – Energie Cottbus – 2001–03, 2006–09
- Danilo Soares – FC Ingolstadt, VfL Bochum – 2015–16, 2021–24
- Vinícius Souza – VfL Wolfsburg – 2025–26
- Raoul Tagliari – Meidericher SV – 1964–66
- Tinga – Borussia Dortmund – 2006–10
- Tita – Bayer Leverkusen – 1987–88
- Tuta – Eintracht Frankfurt – 2020–25
- Vinícius – Hannover 96 – 2002–09
- Walace – Hamburger SV, Hannover 96 – 2016–19
- Wellington – TSG Hoffenheim – 2008–10
- Wendell – Bayer Leverkusen – 2014–21
- Wesley – Werder Bremen – 2010–12
- William – VfL Wolfsburg, Schalke 04 – 2017–22
- Zé Elias – Bayer Leverkusen – 1996–97
- Zé Roberto (José Roberto da Silva Júnior) – Bayer Leverkusen, Bayern Munich, Hamburger SV – 1998–2006, 2007–11
- Zé Roberto (José Roberto de Oliveira) – Schalke 04 – 2007–08
- Zézé – 1. FC Köln – 1964–65

=== Chile ===
- Miiko Albornoz – Hannover 96 – 2014–16, 2017–19
- Charles Aránguiz – Bayer Leverkusen – 2015–23
- Nicolás Castillo – Mainz 05 – 2014–15
- Marcelo Díaz – Hamburger SV – 2014–16
- Júnior Fernándes – Bayer Leverkusen – 2012–13
- Gonzalo Jara – Mainz 05 – 2014–16
- Waldo Ponce – VfL Wolfsburg – 2003–04
- Eduardo Vargas – TSG Hoffenheim – 2015–17
- Arturo Vidal – Bayer Leverkusen, Bayern Munich – 2007–11, 2015–18

=== Colombia ===
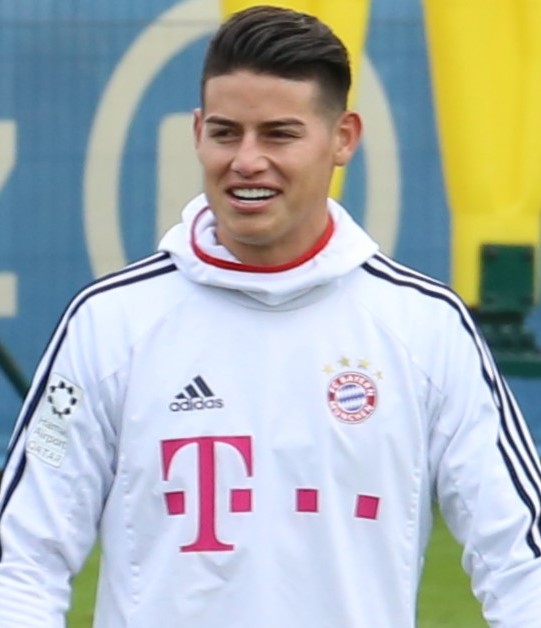
James Rodríguez

- Santiago Arias – Bayer Leverkusen – 2020–21
- Éder Balanta – Schalke 04 – 2022–23
- Jhon Córdoba – Mainz 05, 1. FC Köln, Hertha BSC – 2015–18, 2019–21
- **Luis Díaz** – **Bayern Munich** – 2025–
- Faryd Mondragón – 1. FC Köln – 2008–11
- John Mosquera – Werder Bremen – 2007–08
- Michael Ortega – Bayer Leverkusen – 2011–12
- Juan José Perea – VfB Stuttgart – 2022–23
- Gustavo Puerta – Bayer Leverkusen – 2023–24
- Adrián Ramos – Hertha BSC, Borussia Dortmund – 2009–10, 2011–12, 2013–17
- James Rodríguez – Bayern Munich – 2017–19
- Rafael Santos Borré – Eintracht Frankfurt, Werder Bremen – 2021–24
- Jésus Sinisterra – Arminia Bielefeld – 2002–03
- Elkin Soto – Mainz 05 – 2006–07, 2009–16
- Adolfo Valencia – Bayern Munich – 1993–95

=== Ecuador ===
- **Jeremy Arévalo** – **VfB Stuttgart** – 2025–
- Félix Borja – Mainz 05 – 2009–10
- Carlos Gruezo – VfB Stuttgart, FC Augsburg – 2013–16, 2019–23
- Piero Hincapié – Bayer Leverkusen – 2021–26
- Andersson Ordóñez – Eintracht Frankfurt – 2016–17
- Willian Pacho – Eintracht Frankfurt – 2023–24
- John Yeboah – VfL Wolfsburg – 2018–19

=== Paraguay ===
- Omar Alderete – Hertha BSC – 2020–21
- Lucas Barrios – Borussia Dortmund – 2009–12
- Raúl Bobadilla – Borussia M'gladbach, FC Augsburg – 2009–12, 2013–18
- Julio dos Santos – Bayern Munich – 2005–07
- Dario Lezcano – FC Ingolstadt – 2015–17
- Roque Santa Cruz – Bayern Munich – 1999–2007
- Jonathan Santana – VfL Wolfsburg – 2006–10
- Nelson Valdez – Werder Bremen, Borussia Dortmund, Eintracht Frankfurt – 2002–10, 2014–15
- Julio Villalba – Borussia M'gladbach – 2017–18

=== Peru ===
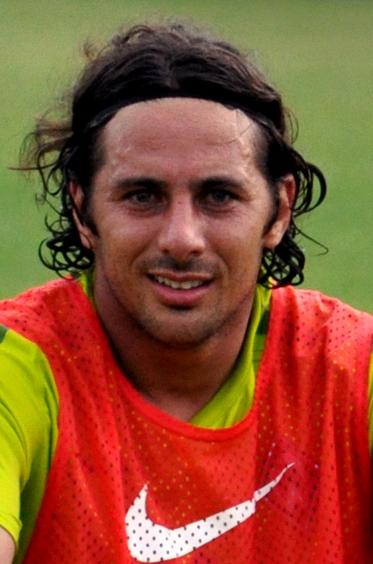
Claudio Pizarro scored 197 goals in 490 Bundesliga matches.

- Luis Advíncula – TSG Hoffenheim – 2012–13
- Carlos Ascues – VfL Wolfsburg – 2015–16
- Julio Baylón – Fortuna Köln – 1973–74
- **Felipe Chávez** – **Bayern Munich** – 2025–
- Jefferson Farfán – Schalke 04 – 2008–15
- **Fabio Gruber** – **Mainz 05** – 2026–
- Paolo Guerrero – Bayern Munich, Hamburger SV – 2004–12
- Percy Olivares – 1. FC Nürnberg – 1992–93
- Augusto Palacios – Kickers Offenbach – 1983–84
- Claudio Pizarro – Werder Bremen, Bayern Munich, 1. FC Köln – 1999–2007, 2008–20
- Roberto Silva – Werder Bremen – 2001–02
- Carlos Zambrano – Schalke 04, FC St. Pauli, Eintracht Frankfurt – 2009–11, 2012–16

=== Uruguay ===
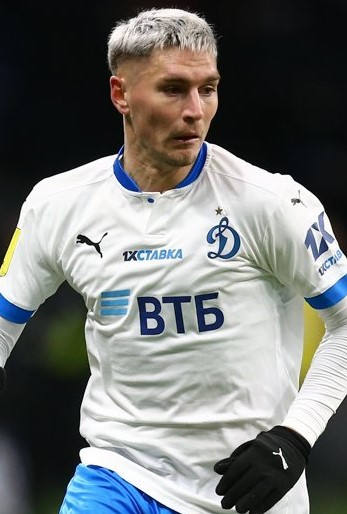
Guillermo Varela

- Juan Carlos Borteiro – Alemannia Aachen – 1967–68
- Pablo Cáceres – MSV Duisburg – 2007–08
- Carlos Grossmüller – Schalke 04 – 2007–09
- Darío Rodríguez – Schalke 04 – 2002–08
- Agustín Rogel – Hertha BSC – 2022–23
- Vicente Sánchez – Schalke 04 – 2007–10
- Marcelo Saracchi – RB Leipzig – 2018–20
- Rubén Sosa – Borussia Dortmund – 1995–96
- Horacio Troche – Alemannia Aachen – 1967–68
- Guillermo Varela – Eintracht Frankfurt – 2016–17
- Gustavo Varela – Schalke 04 – 2002–08
- Rodrigo Zalazar – Schalke 04 – 2022–23

=== Venezuela ===
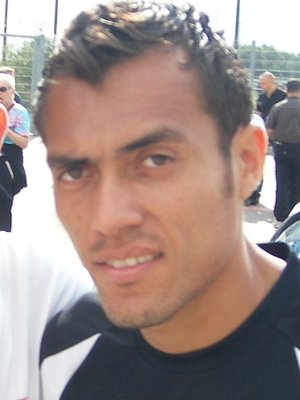
Juan Arango

- Juan Arango – Borussia M'gladbach – 2009–14
- Sergio Córdova – FC Augsburg, Arminia Bielefeld – 2017–22
- Yohandry Orozco – VfL Wolfsburg – 2011–13
- Tomás Rincón – Hamburger SV – 2008–14

== CAF ==
=== Algeria ===
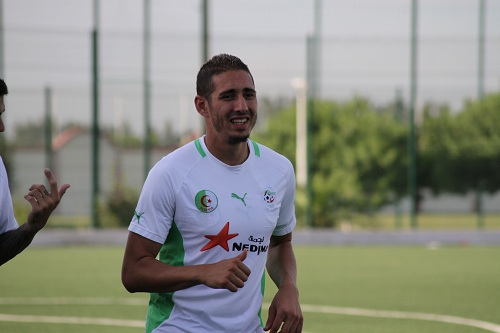
Ishak Belfoldil

- Mohamed Amoura – VfL Wolfsburg – 2024–26
- Chadli Amri – Mainz 05, 1. FC Kaiserslautern – 2006–07, 2009–11
- **Adil Aouchiche** – **Schalke 04** – 2026–
- Ishak Belfodil – Werder Bremen, TSG Hoffenheim, Hertha BSC – 2017–22
- Habib Bellaïd – Eintracht Frankfurt – 2008–09
- **Ramy Bensebaini** – Borussia M'gladbach, **Borussia Dortmund** – 2019–
- Nabil Bentaleb – Schalke 04 – 2016–19, 2020–21
- Soufian Benyamina – VfB Stuttgart – 2012–13
- **Badredine Bouanani** – **VfB Stuttgart** – 2025–
- Mounir Bouziane– Mainz 05 – 2016–17
- **Farès Chaïbi** – **Eintracht Frankfurt** – 2023–
- Salim Djefaflia – Hannover 96 – 2003–04
- **Ibrahim Maza** – Hertha BSC, **Bayer Leverkusen** – 2022–23, 2025–
- Abder Ramdane – Hansa Rostock, SC Freiburg – 1998–2002
- Ahmed Reda Madouni – Borussia Dortmund, Bayer Leverkusen – 2001–07
- Karim Matmour – Borussia M'gladbach, Eintracht Frankfurt – 2008–11, 2012–13
- Idir Ouali – SC Paderborn – 2014–15
- Antar Yahia – VfL Bochum, 1. FC Kaiserslautern – 2006–10, 2011–12
- Karim Ziani – VfL Wolfsburg – 2009–11

=== Angola ===
- Anderson Lucoqui – Arminia Bielefeld, Mainz 05 – 2020–23
- Rui Marques – SSV Ulm, VfB Stuttgart – 1999–2003
- Miguel Pereira – Schalke 04 – 1993–95, 1996–99
- Nando Rafael – Hertha BSC, Borussia M'gladbach, FC Augsburg, Fortuna Düsseldorf – 2002–07, 2011–13
- José Pierre Vunguidica – 1. FC Köln – 2010–11

=== Benin ===
- Moudachirou Amadou – FC St. Pauli – 2001–02
- Andréas Hountondji – FC St. Pauli – 2025–26
- Moussa Latoundji – Energie Cottbus – 2000–03
- **Steve Mounié** – **FC Augsburg** – 2024–
- Cebio Soukou – Arminia Bielefeld – 2020–21

=== Burkina Faso ===
- Aristide Bancé – Mainz 05, FC Augsburg – 2009–10, 2012–13
- **Cyriaque Irié** – **SC Freiburg** – 2025–
- Issa Kaboré – Werder Bremen – 2024–25
- Alassane Ouédraogo – 1. FC Köln – 2000–02
- Jonathan Pitroipa – SC Freiburg, Hamburger SV – 2004–05, 2008–11
- Wilfried Sanou – SC Freiburg, 1. FC Köln – 2003–05, 2008–11
- **Edmond Tapsoba** – **Bayer Leverkusen** – 2019–

=== Cameroon ===
- Timothée Atouba – Hamburger SV – 2005–09
- Yann Aurel Bisseck – 1. FC Köln – 2017–18
- Serge Branco – Eintracht Frankfurt, VfB Stuttgart – 2000–01, 2003–04
- Eric Maxim Choupo-Moting – Hamburger SV, 1. FC Nürnberg, Mainz 05, Schalke 04, Bayern Munich – 2007–08, 2009–17, 2020–24
- **Junior Dina Ebimbe** – **Eintracht Frankfurt** – 2022–
- Joël Epalle – VfL Bochum – 2006–10
- Franck Evina – Bayern Munich – 2017–18
- Mohammadou Idrissou – Hannover 96, MSV Duisburg, SC Freiburg, Borussia M'gladbach – 2002–06, 2007–08, 2009–11
- Samuel Ipoua – 1860 Munich – 2001–02
- Raymond Kalla – VfL Bochum – 2002–05
- Francis Kioyo – 1860 Munich, Energie Cottbus – 2003–04, 2006–08
- **Christian Kofane** – **Bayer Leverkusen** – 2025–
- Dorge Kouemaha – 1. FC Kaiserslautern, Eintracht Frankfurt – 2011–13
- Pierre Kunde – Mainz 05, VfL Bochum – 2018–21, 2022–23
- Léonard Kweuke – Eintracht Frankfurt – 2008–09
- Georges Mandjeck – VfB Stuttgart – 2008–09
- Joël Matip – Schalke 04 – 2009–16
- Marvin Matip – VfL Bochum, 1. FC Köln, FC Ingolstadt – 2004–06, 2008–10, 2015–17
- Lucien Mettomo – 1. FC Kaiserslautern – 2003–06
- Marcel Ndjeng – Arminia Bielefeld, Borussia M'gladbach, Hamburger SV, FC Augsburg, Hertha BSC – 2006–07, 2008–09, 2011–12, 2013–15
- Georges Ndoum – MSV Duisburg – 2007–08
- Louis Ngwat-Mahop – Bayern Munich – 2006–07
- Patrick Njambe – Borussia Dortmund – 2007–08
- Paul-Georges Ntep – VfL Wolfsburg – 2016–18
- Edgar Salli – 1. FC Nürnberg – 2018–19
- Rigobert Song – 1. FC Köln – 2001–02
- Alphonse Tchami – Hertha BSC – 1997–99
- Joël Tchami – Hertha BSC – 2001–02
- Bill Tchato – 1. FC Kaiserslautern – 2002–05
- Somen Tchoyi – FC Augsburg – 2012–13
- Pierre Womé – Werder Bremen, 1. FC Köln – 2006–07, 2008–10
- Jacques Zoua – Hamburger SV – 2013–14

=== Comoros ===
- Myziane Maolida – Hertha BSC – 2021–23
- **Warmed Omari** – **Hamburger SV** – 2025–

=== Congo ===
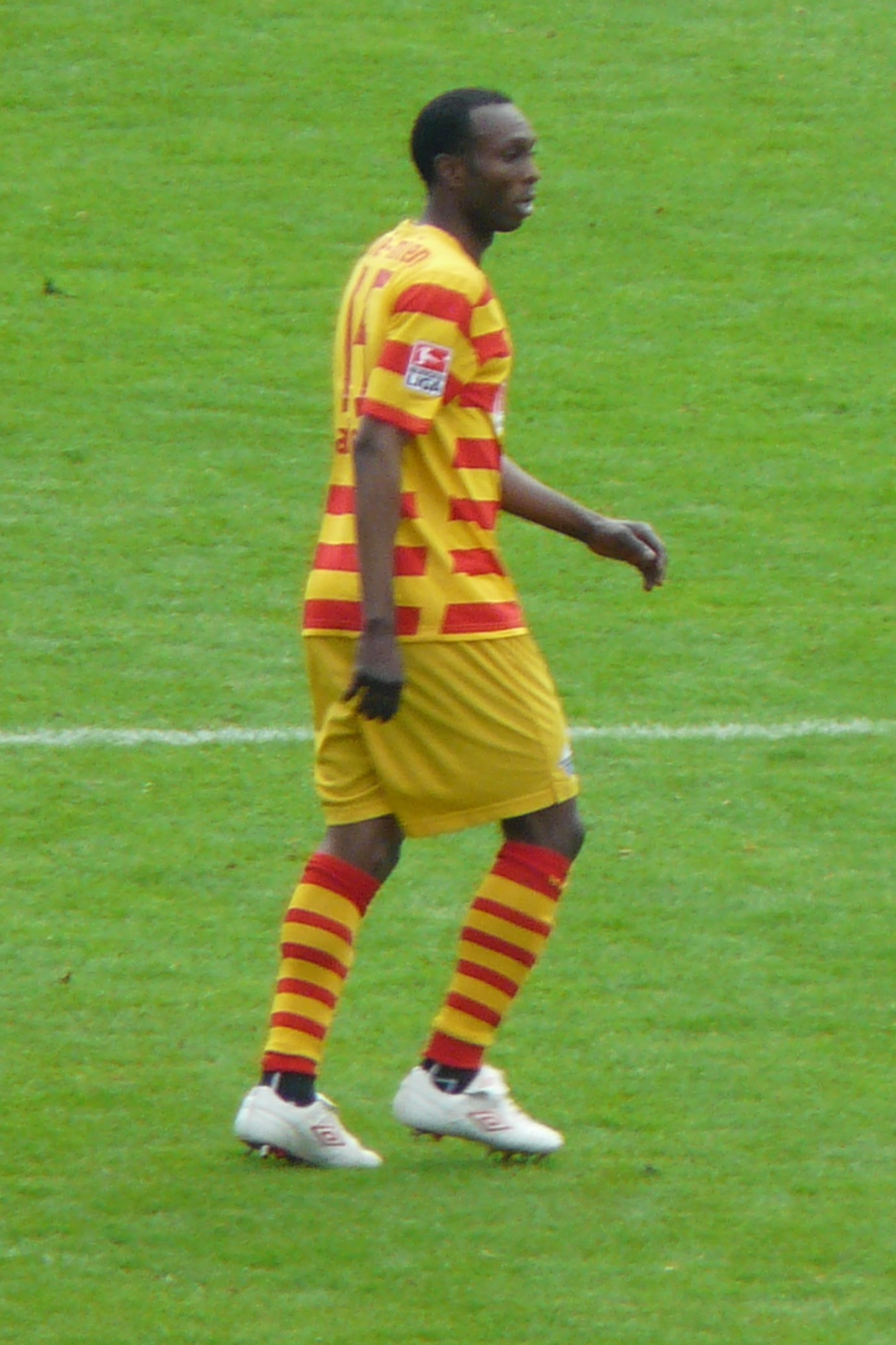
Rolf-Christel Guié-Mien

- Silvère Ganvoula – VfL Bochum – 2021–23
- **Han-Noah Massengo** – **FC Augsburg** – 2025–
- Rolf-Christel Guié-Mien – Karlsruher SC, Eintracht Frankfurt, SC Freiburg, 1. FC Köln – 1997–98, 1999–2001, 2003–04, 2005–06
- Christopher Samba – Hertha BSC – 2005–07
- Jean Tsoumou-Madza – Eintracht Frankfurt – 2003–04
- Macchambes Younga-Mouhani – Borussia M'gladbach, Fortuna Düsseldorf – 1995–97

=== DR Congo ===
Until 1997 named Zaire

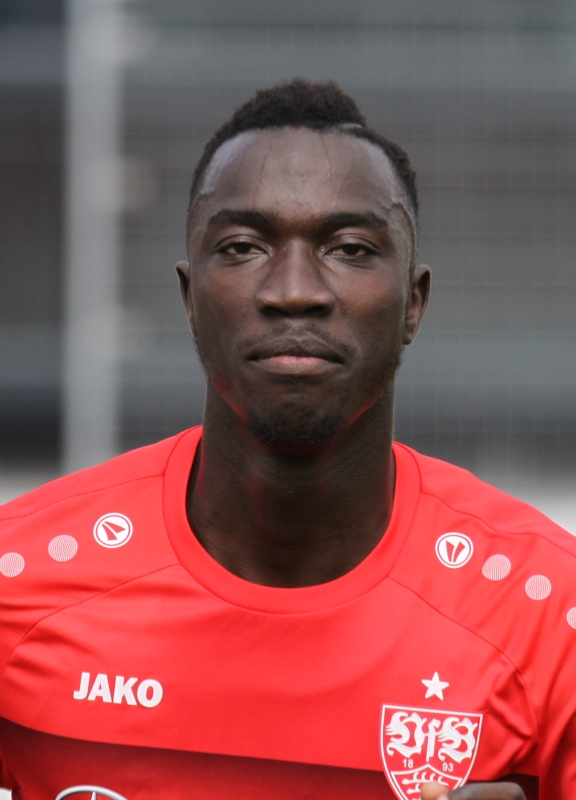
Silas

- Chadrac Akolo – VfB Stuttgart – 2017–19
- Jean-Kasongo Banza – VfL Wolfsburg – 1999–2000
- Samuel Essende – FC Augsburg – 2024–26
- Elias Kachunga – Borussia M'gladbach, SC Paderborn, FC Ingolstadt – 2010–11, 2014–16
- Etepe Kakoko – VfB Stuttgart – 1981–82
- Wilson Kamavuaka – 1. FC Nürnberg, Darmstadt 98 – 2011–12, 2016–17
- Domi Kumbela – Eintracht Braunschweig – 2013–14
- Nzelo Hervé Lembi – 1. FC Kaiserslautern – 2002–06
- Assani Lukimya – Hansa Rostock, Werder Bremen – 2007–08, 2012–16
- **Jordy Makengo** – **SC Freiburg** – 2023–
- Cédric Makiadi – VfL Wolfsburg, SC Freiburg, Werder Bremen – 2004–07, 2009–15
- Michél Mazingu-Dinzey – VfB Stuttgart, FC St. Pauli, Hertha BSC, 1860 Munich – 1994–96, 1997–2000
- Dieumerci Mbokani – VfL Wolfsburg – 2010–11
- Nathanaël Mbuku – FC Augsburg – 2022–24
- Addy-Waku Menga – Hansa Rostock – 2007–08
- Jean-Santos Muntubila – 1. FC Saarbrücken – 1985–86
- Afimico Pululu – Arminia Bielefeld – 2021–22
- Kosi Saka – Borussia Dortmund – 2005–07
- **Silas** – VfB Stuttgart, **Mainz 05** – 2020–24, 2025–
- Marcel Tisserand – FC Ingolstadt, VfL Wolfsburg – 2016–20

=== Egypt ===
- Mohamed Emara – Hansa Rostock – 1998–2002
- Ahmed Salah Hosny – VfB Stuttgart – 1998–2001
- Samir Ibrahim – 1. FC Kaiserslautern – 1998–99
- Omar Marmoush – VfL Wolfsburg, VfB Stuttgart, Eintracht Frankfurt – 2019–25
- Hany Ramzy – Werder Bremen, 1. FC Kaiserslautern – 1994–2004
- Radwan Yasser – Hansa Rostock – 1996–2002
- Mohamed Zidan – Werder Bremen, Mainz 05, Hamburger SV, Borussia Dortmund – 2004–12

=== Equatorial Guinea ===
- Ben Manga – Fortuna Düsseldorf – 1995–96
- Omar Mascarell – Eintracht Frankfurt, Schalke 04 – 2016–21

=== Gabon ===
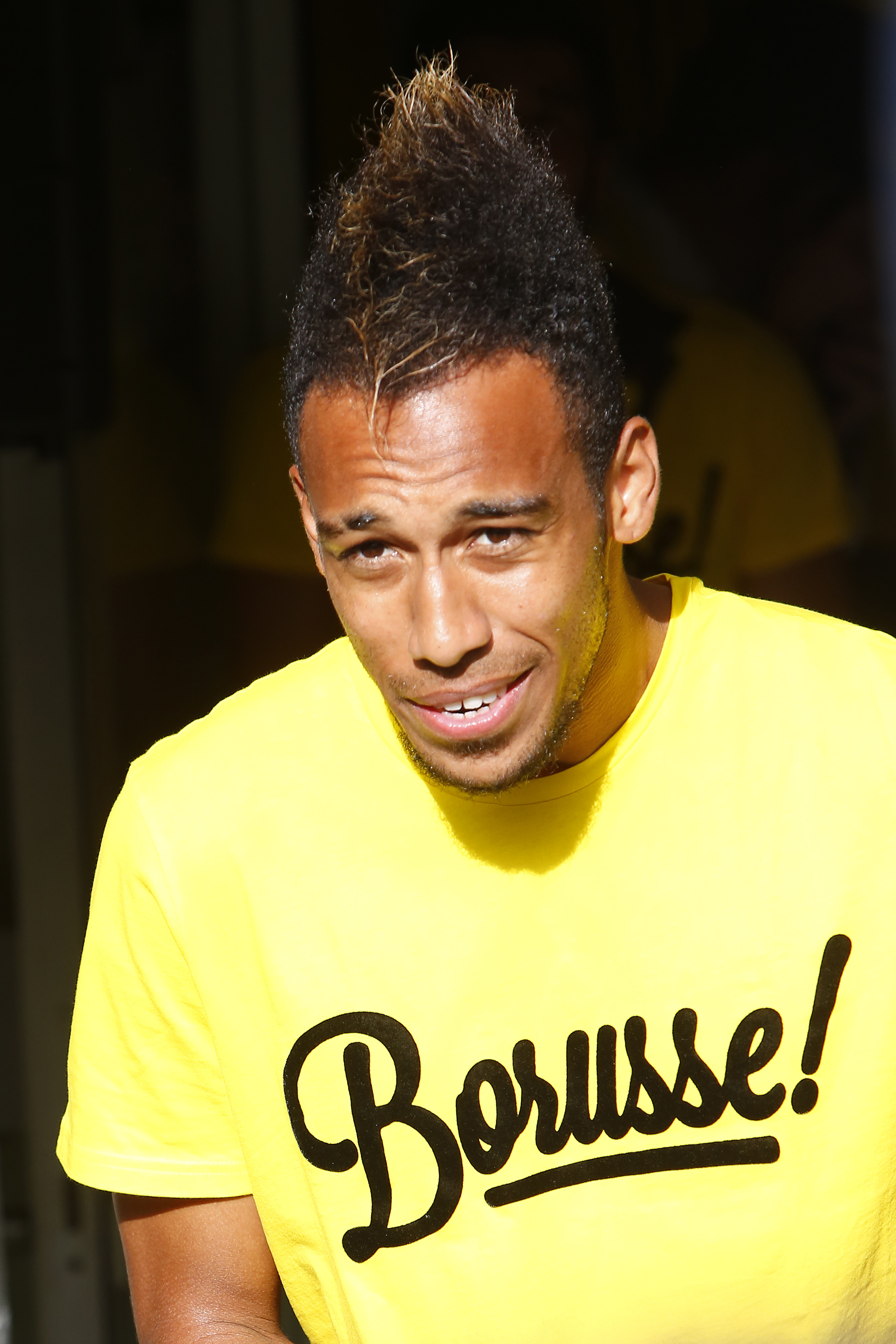
Pierre-Emerick Aubameyang was awarded African Footballer of the Year in 2015.

- Pierre-Emerick Aubameyang – Borussia Dortmund – 2013–18

=== Gambia ===
- Dawda Bah – FC Augsburg – 2011–12
- Abdoulie Ceesay – FC St. Pauli – 2024–26
- Leon Guwara – Werder Bremen, Darmstadt – 2015–17
- Saidy Janko – VfL Bochum – 2022–23
- Bakery Jatta – Hamburger SV – 2016–18
- Ousman Manneh – Werder Bremen – 2016–17

=== Ghana ===
- Kasim Adams Nuhu – TSG Hoffenheim, Fortuna Düsseldorf – 2018–22, 2023–24
- Otto Addo – Borussia Dortmund, Mainz 05, Hamburger SV – 1999–2008
- Jonas Adjetey – VfL Wolfsburg – 2025–26
- Godfried Aduobe – Hansa Rostock, Karlsruher SC – 2002–05, 2007–09
- Lawrence Aidoo – Borussia M'gladbach, 1. FC Nürnberg, Energie Cottbus – 2001–05, 2006–07
- Charles Akonnor – VfL Wolfsburg – 1998–2003
- Stephan Ambrosius – Hamburger SV – 2017–18
- Matthew Amoah – Borussia Dortmund – 2005–07
- Opoku Ampomah – Fortuna Düsseldorf – 2019–20
- Anthony Annan – Schalke 04 – 2010–11, 2013–14
- Christopher Antwi-Adjei – SC Paderborn, VfL Bochum – 2019–20, 2021–24
- Baba Rahman – Greuther Fürth, FC Augsburg, Schalke 04 – 2012–13, 2014–15, 2016–19
- Anthony Baffoe – 1. FC Köln, Fortuna Düsseldorf – 1983–84, 1989–92
- Isaac Boakye – Arminia Bielefeld, VfL Wolfsburg, 1. FC Nürnberg – 2004–08, 2009–11
- Derek Boateng – 1. FC Köln – 2008–09
- Kevin-Prince Boateng – Hertha BSC, Borussia Dortmund, Schalke 04, Eintracht Frankfurt – 2005–07, 2008–09, 2013–15, 2017–18, 2021–23
- Davidson Eden – FC St. Pauli – 2010–11
- Bashiru Gambo – Borussia Dortmund – 1997–98, 1999–2000
- **Jan Gyamerah** – **SV Elversberg** – 2026–
- Ali Ibrahim – Wattenscheid 09 – 1990–94
- Abass Issah – Mainz 05 – 2018–19, 2020–21
- Awudu Issaka – 1860 Munich – 1998–99
- **Derrick Köhn** – Werder Bremen, **Union Berlin** – 2024–
- **Ransford-Yeboah Königsdörffer** – Hamburger SV, **Mainz 05** – 2025–
- Samuel Kuffour – Bayern Munich – 1994–95, 1996–2005
- **Daniel-Kofi Kyereh** – **SC Freiburg** – 2022–
- Derrick Luckassen – Hertha BSC – 2018–19
- Yahaya Mallam – Borussia Dortmund – 1994–97
- Braydon Manu – Darmstadt 98 – 2023–24
- **Gideon Mensah** – **1. FC Köln** – 2026–
- Alex Nyarko – Karlsruher SC – 1997–98
- Ebenezer Ofori – VfB Stuttgart – 2017–18
- Kelvin Ofori – Fortuna Düsseldorf – 2019–20
- Daniel Opare – FC Augsburg – 2015–16, 2017–18
- Alexander Opoku – VfB Leipzig – 1993–94
- Kwasi Okyere Wriedt – Bayern Munich – 2017–18, 2019–20
- Abedi Pele – 1860 Munich – 1996–98
- Patric Pfeiffer – FC Augsburg – 2023–24
- Christian Saba – Hertha BSC – 1998–99
- Edward Sarpei – 1. FC Köln – 1993–94
- Hans Sarpei – VfL Wolfsburg, Bayer Leverkusen, Schalke 04 – 2001–11
- Hans Nunoo Sarpei – VfB Stuttgart, Greuther Fürth – 2018–19, 2021–22
- Kingsley Schindler – 1. FC Köln – 2019–20, 2021–23
- Ibrahim Sunday – Werder Bremen – 1975–76
- Prince Tagoe – TSG Hoffenheim – 2009–12
- Charles Takyi – Hamburger SV, FC St. Pauli – 2005–06, 2010–11
- Ibrahim Tanko – Borussia Dortmund, SC Freiburg – 1994–2002, 2003–05
- Bernard Tekpetey – Schalke 04, Fortuna Düsseldorf – 2016–17, 2019–20
- Isaac Vorsah – TSG Hoffenheim – 2008–12
- Tony Yeboah – Eintracht Frankfurt, Hamburger SV – 1990–95, 1997–2002

=== Guinea ===
- Mamadou Bah – VfB Stuttgart – 2010–13
- Aliou Baldé – VfL Bochum – 2024–25
- Abdourahmane Barry – Greuther Fürth – 2021–22
- Taifour Diané – Bayer Leverkusen – 1994–95
- Momo Cissé – VfB Stuttgart – 2020–21
- Simon Falette – Eintracht Frankfurt – 2017–20
- Morgan Guilavogui – FC St. Pauli – 2024–25
- **Serhou Guirassy** – 1. FC Köln, VfB Stuttgart, **Borussia Dortmund** – 2016–18, 2022–
- Naby Keïta – RB Leipzig, Werder Bremen – 2016–18, 2023–24
- Ilaix Moriba – RB Leipzig – 2021–22
- Pablo Thiam – 1. FC Köln, VfB Stuttgart, Bayern Munich, VfL Wolfsburg – 1994–2008
- Ibrahima Traoré – Hertha BSC, VfB Stuttgart, Borussia M'gladbach – 2007–08, 2011–21

=== Guinea-Bissau ===
- **Iaia Manco Danfa** – **Borussia M'gladbach** – 2026–
- Almami Moreira – Hamburger SV – 2004–05

=== Ivory Coast ===
- **Chris Bedia** – **Union Berlin** – 2023–24
- Arthur Boka – VfB Stuttgart – 2006–14
- Mathis Bolly – Fortuna Düsseldorf – 2012–13
- Guy Demel – Borussia Dortmund, Hamburger SV – 2002–11
- Serey Die – VfB Stuttgart – 2014–16
- Yan Diomande – RB Leipzig – 2025–26
- Constant Djakpa – Bayer Leverkusen, Hannover 96, Eintracht Frankfurt – 2008–11, 2012–16
- David Datro Fofana – Union Berlin – 2023–24
- Jean-Philippe Gbamin – Mainz 05 – 2016–19
- Steve Gohouri – Borussia M'gladbach – 2006–07, 2008–09
- Sébastien Haller – Eintracht Frankfurt, Borussia Dortmund – 2017–19, 2022–24
- Salomon Kalou – Hertha BSC – 2014–20
- Wilfried Kanga – Hertha BSC – 2022–23
- Arouna Koné – Hannover 96 – 2009–10
- Odilon Kossounou – Bayer Leverkusen – 2021–24
- **Emmanuel Latte Lath** – **Union Berlin** – 2026–
- Evan Ndicka – Eintracht Frankfurt – 2018–23
- Boubacar Sanogo – 1. FC Kaiserslautern, Hamburger SV, Werder Bremen, TSG Hoffenheim – 2005–10
- Giovanni Sio – VfL Wolfsburg, FC Augsburg – 2011–14
- Ibrahim Sissoko – VfL Wolfsburg – 2011–12
- Bazoumana Touré – TSG Hoffenheim – 2024–26
- **Elye Wahi** – **Eintracht Frankfurt** – 2024–
- Didier Ya Konan – Hannover 96 – 2009–15

=== Libya ===
- **Daniel Elfadli** – **Hamburger SV** – 2025–

=== Mali ===
- Soumaila Coulibaly – SC Freiburg, Borussia M'gladbach – 2000–02, 2003–05, 2008–09
- Garra Dembélé – SC Freiburg – 2011–13
- Bakary Diakité – Mainz 05 – 2006–07
- Boubacar Diarra – SC Freiburg – 1998–2002, 2003–05
- Amadou Haidara – RB Leipzig – 2018–25
- Diadie Samassékou – TSG Hoffenheim – 2019–25
- **Moussa Sylla** – **Schalke 04** – 2026–
- Almamy Touré – Eintracht Frankfurt – 2018–23
- El Bilal Touré – VfB Stuttgart – 2024–25
- Sambou Yatabaré – Werder Bremen – 2015–17

=== Morocco ===
- Yacine Abdessadki – SC Freiburg – 2009–12
- Amine Adli – Bayer Leverkusen – 2021–25
- Abdelaziz Ahanfouf – Hansa Rostock, SpVgg Unterhaching, MSV Duisburg, Arminia Bielefeld – 1999–2001, 2005–07
- Hamadi Al Ghaddioui – VfB Stuttgart – 2020–22
- **Ayoube Amaimouni** – **Eintracht Frankfurt** – 2025–
- Mohamed Amsif – FC Augsburg – 2011–14
- **Ayman Azhil** – Bayer Leverkusen, **Borussia Dortmund** – 2022–23, 2024–
- **Adam Aznou** – **Bayern Munich** – 2024–
- Rachid Azzouzi – MSV Duisburg – 1991–92, 1993–95
- Aymen Barkok – Eintracht Frankfurt, Fortuna Düsseldorf, 1. FSV Mainz 05 – 2016–25
- Younès Belhanda – Schalke 04 – 2015–16
- **Eliesse Ben Seghir** – **Bayer Leverkusen** – 2025–
- Mehdi Benatia – Bayern Munich – 2014–16
- Nassim Boujellab – Schalke 04 – 2018–21
- Mourad Bounoua – Eintracht Frankfurt – 1998–99
- Ouasim Bouy – Hamburger SV – 2013–14
- Adil Chihi – 1. FC Köln – 2008–12
- **Neil El Aynaoui** – **RB Leipzig** – 2026–
- **Soufiane El-Faouzi** – **Schalke 04** – 2026–
- **Bilal El Khannouss** – **VfB Stuttgart** – 2025–
- Nasir El Kasmi – MSV Duisburg – 2005–06
- Ismaël Gharbi – FC Augsburg – 2025–26
- Achraf Hakimi – Borussia Dortmund – 2018–20
- Amine Harit – Schalke 04 – 2017–21
- Hamza Mendyl – Schalke 04 – 2018–19, 2020–21
- Noussair Mazraoui – Bayern Munich – 2022–24
- Youssef Mokhtari – 1. FC Köln, MSV Duisburg – 2005–06, 2007–08
- **Bilal Nadir** – **Hamburger SV** – 2026–
- Anas Ouahim – 1. FC Köln – 2017–18
- Abderrahim Ouakili – 1860 Munich – 1997–99
- Abdelhamid Sabiri – SC Paderborn – 2019–20
- **Ismael Saibari** – **Bayern Munich** – 2026–
- Hamid Termina – Energie Cottbus – 2001–02

=== Mozambique ===
- Alfons Amade – TSG Hoffenheim – 2018–19
- Ronny Marcos – Hamburger SV – 2014–15

=== Namibia ===
- Collin Benjamin – Hamburger SV – 2001–05, 2006–09, 2010–11
- Razundara Tjikuzu – Werder Bremen, Hansa Rostock, MSV Duisburg – 1999–2006

=== Nigeria ===
- Dickson Abiama – Greuther Fürth – 2021–22
- Suleiman Abdullahi – Union Berlin – 2019–20
- Yakubu Adamu – FC St. Pauli – 2001–02
- Victor Agali – Hansa Rostock, Schalke 04 – 1998–2004, 2007–08
- **Felix Agu** – **Werder Bremen** – 2020–21, 2022–
- Joseph Akpala – Werder Bremen – 2012–13
- Jonathan Akpoborie – Hansa Rostock, VfB Stuttgart, VfL Wolfsburg – 1995–2001
- Kevin Akpoguma – TSG Hoffenheim, Hannover 96 – 2017–26
- Tolu Arokodare – 1. FC Köln – 2020–21
- Taiwo Awoniyi – Mainz 05, Union Berlin – 2019–22
- Haruna Babangida – Mainz 05 – 2010–11
- Leon Balogun – Hannover 96, Werder Bremen, Fortuna Düsseldorf, Mainz 05 – 2008–11, 2012–13, 2015–18
- Noah Sarenren Bazee – Hannover 96, FC Augsburg – 2015–16, 2017–23
- **Victor Boniface** – **Bayer Leverkusen**, Werder Bremen – 2023–
- Jamilu Collins – SC Paderborn – 2019–20
- Emmanuel Dennis – 1. FC Köln – 2020–21
- Kingsley Ehizibue – 1. FC Köln – 2019–23
- Chidera Ejuke – Hertha BSC – 2022–23
- Emeka Ifejiagwa – VfL Wolfsburg – 2000–01
- Victor Ikpeba – Borussia Dortmund – 1999–2001
- Henry Isaac (Nwosu) – Eintracht Frankfurt – 1998–99
- Manasseh Ishiaku – MSV Duisburg, 1. FC Köln – 2007–10
- Abdul Iyodo – Schalke 04 – 2002–03
- Ademola Lookman – RB Leipzig – 2017–18, 2019–20
- Obafemi Martins – VfL Wolfsburg – 2009–10
- Gabriel Melkam – Hansa Rostock – 2003–05
- **Terem Moffi** – **Hamburger SV** – 2026–
- Abiodun Obafemi – Fortuna Düsseldorf – 1996–97
- Chinedu Obasi – TSG Hoffenheim, Schalke 04 – 2008–15
- Victor Obinna – Darmstadt 98 – 2016–17
- Chima Okoroji – SC Freiburg – 2018–19
- Peter Ogaba – MSV Duisburg – 1993–94
- **Uchenna Ogundu** – **FC Augsburg** – 2025–
- Adebowale Ogungbure – 1. FC Nürnberg – 2001–02
- Pascal Ojigwe – 1. FC Kaiserslautern, Bayer Leverkusen, Borussia M'gladbach – 1997–99, 2000–04
- Jay-Jay Okocha – Eintracht Frankfurt – 1992–96
- Solomon Okoronkwo – Hertha BSC – 2005–08
- Seyi Olajengbesi – SC Freiburg – 2003–05
- Sunday Oliseh – 1. FC Köln, Borussia Dortmund, VfL Bochum – 1995–97, 2000–05
- **Raphael Onyedika** – **Eintracht Frankfurt** – 2026–
- Frank Onyeka – FC Augsburg – 2024–25
- Gift Orban – TSG Hoffenheim – 2024–25
- Victor Osimhen – VfL Wolfsburg – 2016–18
- **Philip Otele** – **Hamburger SV** – 2025–
- **Nathan Tella** – **Bayer Leverkusen** – 2023–
- **Jordan Torunarigha** – Hertha BSC, **Hamburger SV** – 2016–22, 2025–
- Anthony Ujah – Mainz 05, 1. FC Köln, Werder Bremen, Union Berlin – 2011–12, 2014–16, 2017–22
- Eke Uzoma – SC Freiburg – 2009–10
- Taribo West – 1. FC Kaiserslautern – 2001–02

=== Senegal ===
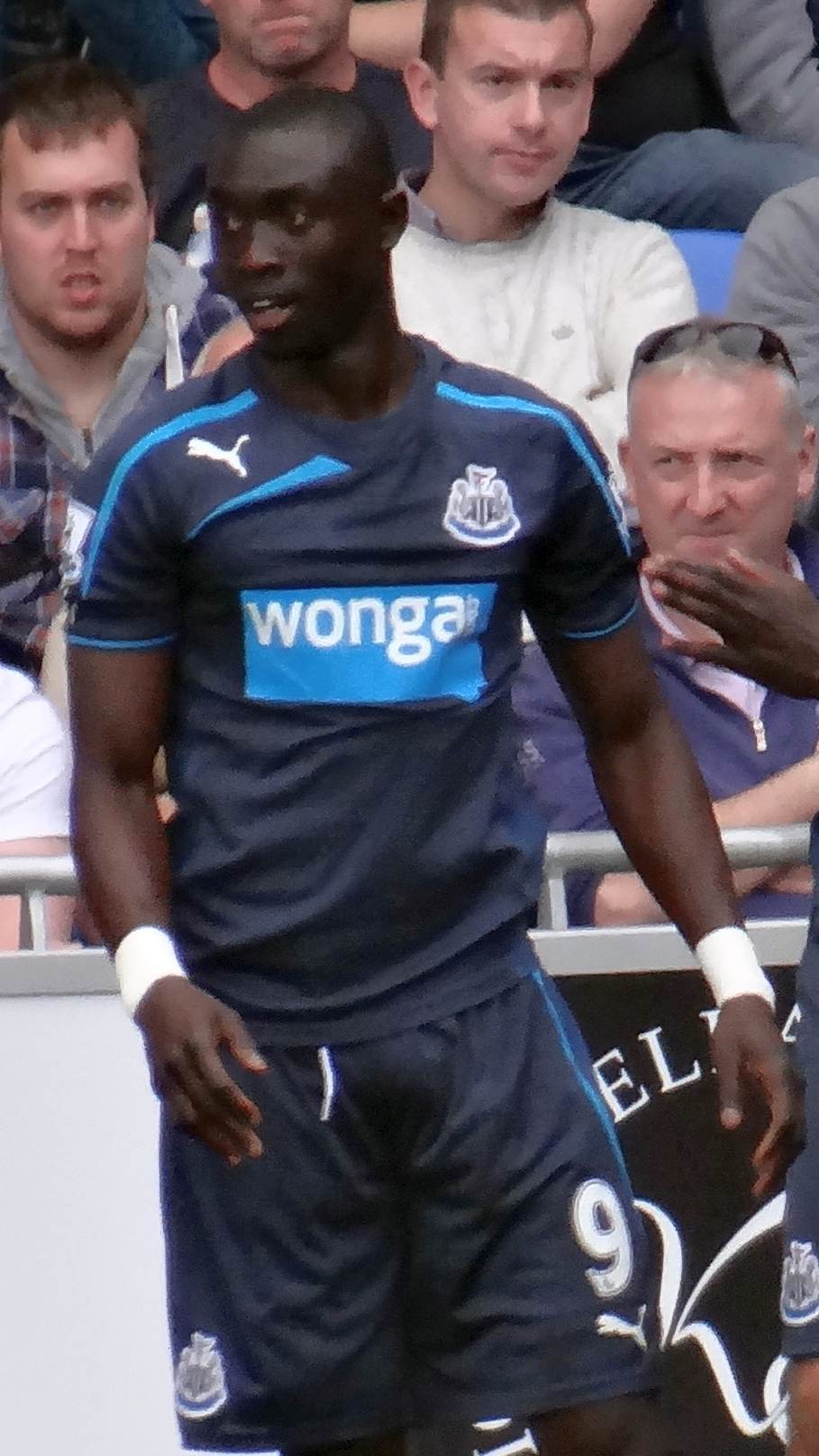
Papiss Cissé scored 37 goals in Bundesliga for SC Freiburg.

- Demba Ba – TSG Hoffenheim – 2008–11
- Papiss Cissé – SC Freiburg – 2009–12
- Mamadou Diabang – Arminia Bielefeld, VfL Bochum – 2002–05
- Fallou Diagne – SC Freiburg, Werder Bremen – 2011–14, 2016–17
- Abdou Diallo – Mainz 05, Borussia Dortmund, RB Leipzig – 2017–19, 2022–23
- Mamadou Diallo – MSV Duisburg – 1998–99
- Dame Diouf – Hannover 96 – 2002–03
- Mame Biram Diouf – Hannover 96 – 2011–14
- Baye Djiby Fall – Greuther Fürth – 2012–13
- Papy Djilobodji – Werder Bremen – 2015–16
- Ricardo Faty – Bayer Leverkusen – 2007–08
- Louis Gomis – 1. FC Nürnberg – 2001–02
- Babacar Guèye – SC Paderborn – 2019–20
- Nicolas Jackson – Bayern Munich – 2025–26
- Ismail Jakobs – 1. FC Köln – 2019–21
- Sadio Mané – Bayern Munich – 2022–23
- Jackson Mendy – SC Freiburg – 2009–10
- Babacar N'Diaye – Hannover 96 – 2002–03
- Moussa Niakhaté – Mainz 05 – 2018–22
- Mame Niang – VfL Wolfsburg – 2007–08
- Lamine Sané – Werder Bremen – 2016–18
- Salif Sané – Hannover 96, Schalke 04 – 2013–16, 2017–21
- Souleyman Sané – 1. FC Nürnberg, Wattenscheid 09 – 1988–94
- **Bara Sapoko Ndiaye** – **Bayern Munich** – 2025–
- Bouna Sarr – Bayern Munich – 2020–24
- Mickaël Tavares – Hamburger SV, 1. FC Nürnberg – 2008–10

=== Seychelles ===
- Michael Mancienne – Hamburger SV – 2011–14

=== Sierra Leone ===
- **Juma Bah** – **FC Augsburg** – 2011–
- Gibril Sankoh – FC Augsburg – 2011–13

=== South Africa ===
- Delron Buckley – VfL Bochum, Arminia Bielefeld, Borussia Dortmund – 1996–99, 2000–01, 2002–06, 2007–09
- Bradley Carnell – VfB Stuttgart, Borussia M'gladbach, Karlsruher SC – 1998–2005, 2007–09
- Lance Davids – 1860 Munich – 2003–04
- Rowen Fernández – Arminia Bielefeld – 2007–08
- Rowan Hendricks – Eintracht Frankfurt – 1999–2000
- Glenn Jordens – Darmstadt 98 – 1981–82
- Siyabonga Nkosi – Arminia Bielefeld – 2007–09
- Steven Pienaar – Borussia Dortmund – 2006–07
- Sibusiso Zuma – Arminia Bielefeld – 2005–08

=== Togo ===
- Ihlas Bebou – Hannover 96, TSG Hoffenheim – 2017–26
- Henri Koudossou – FC Augsburg – 2024–25
- Peniel Mlapa – TSG Hoffenheim, Borussia M'gladbach – 2010–14
- Dikeni Salifou – Werder Bremen – 2022–23
- Bachirou Salou – Borussia M'gladbach, MSV Duisburg, Borussia Dortmund, Eintracht Frankfurt, Hansa Rostock – 1990–95, 1996–2003
- Assimiou Touré – Bayer Leverkusen – 2006–07, 2009–10

=== Tunisia ===
- Aymen Abdennour – Werder Bremen – 2009–10
- Sami Allagui – Mainz 05, Hertha BSC – 2010–12, 2013–15, 2016–17
- Zoubeir Baya – SC Freiburg – 1998–2001
- Mehdi Ben Slimane – SC Freiburg – 1998–2000
- Änis Ben-Hatira – Hamburger SV, Hertha BSC, Eintracht Frankfurt, Darmstadt 98 – 2006–09, 2010–12, 2013–17
- Sofian Chahed – Hertha BSC, Hannover 96 – 2003–04, 2005–13
- Adel Chedli – 1. FC Nürnberg – 2005–06
- Amine Chermiti – Hertha BSC – 2008–09
- Nejmeddin Daghfous – Mainz 05 – 2012–13
- Mohamed Dräger – SC Freiburg, SC Paderborn – 2017–18, 2019–20
- Jeremy Dudziak – Borussia Dortmund, Greuther Fürth – 2014–15, 2021–22
- Ismaël Gharbi – FC Augsburg – 2025–26
- Mohamed Gouaida – Hamburger SV – 2014–15, 2017–18
- Marouene Guezmir – SC Freiburg – 1996–97
- Karim Haggui – Bayer Leverkusen, Hannover 96, VfB Stuttgart – 2006–14
- Ammar Jemal – 1. FC Köln – 2011–12
- **Rani Khedira** – VfB Stuttgart, RB Leipzig, FC Augsburg, **Union Berlin** – 2013–14, 2016–
- Salim Khelifi – Eintracht Braunschweig – 2013–14
- Aïssa Laïdouni – Union Berlin – 2022–24
- Jawhar Mnari – 1. FC Nürnberg – 2005–08, 2009–10
- Hamed Namouchi – SC Freiburg – 2009–10
- Elias Saad – FC St. Pauli – 2024–26
- Adel Sellimi – SC Freiburg – 1998–2002
- **Ellyes Skhiri** – **1. FC Köln**, Eintracht Frankfurt – 2019–

=== Uganda ===
- Herbert Bockhorn – VfL Bochum – 2021–22
- Melvyn Lorenzen – Werder Bremen – 2013–16

=== Zambia ===
- **Patson Daka** – **Hamburger SV** – 2026–
- Christopher Katongo – Arminia Bielefeld – 2008–09
- Moses Sichone – 1. FC Köln, Alemannia Aachen – 2000–02, 2003–04, 2006–07
- Andrew Sinkala – Bayern Munich, 1. FC Köln, FC Augsburg – 1999–2002, 2003–04, 2005–06, 2011–12

=== Zimbabwe ===
- Knowledge Musona – TSG Hoffenheim, FC Augsburg – 2011–13

== AFC ==
=== Australia ===
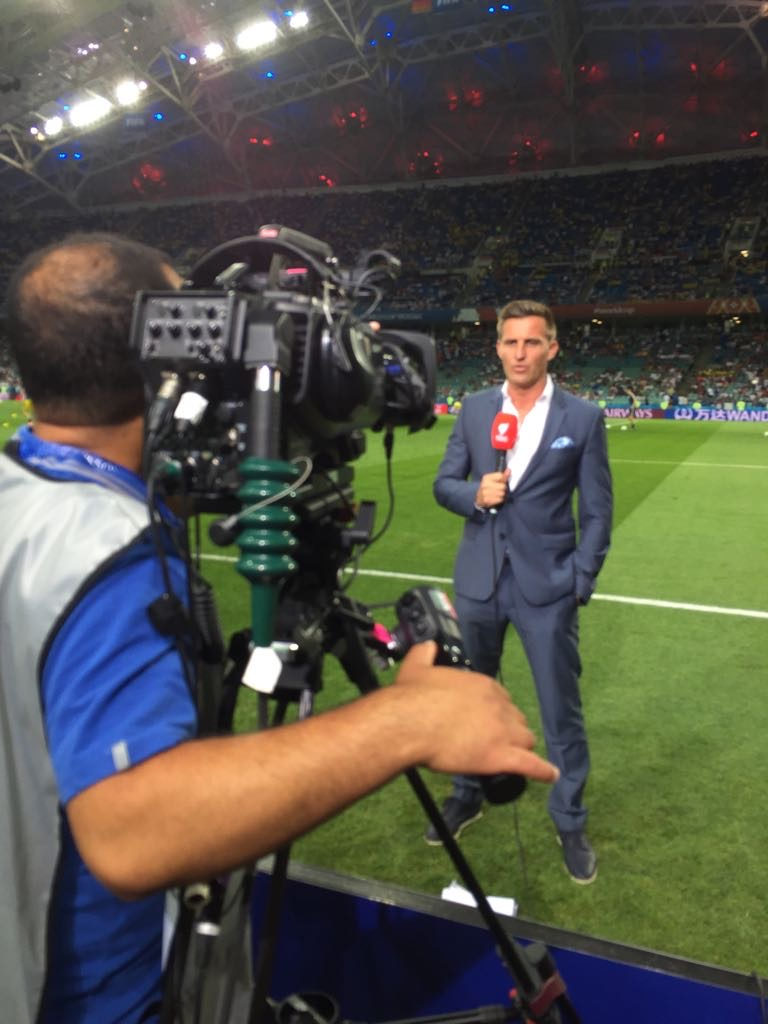
David Zdrilic

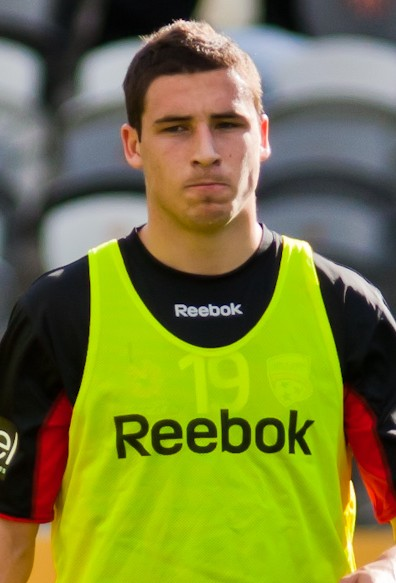
Mathew Leckie

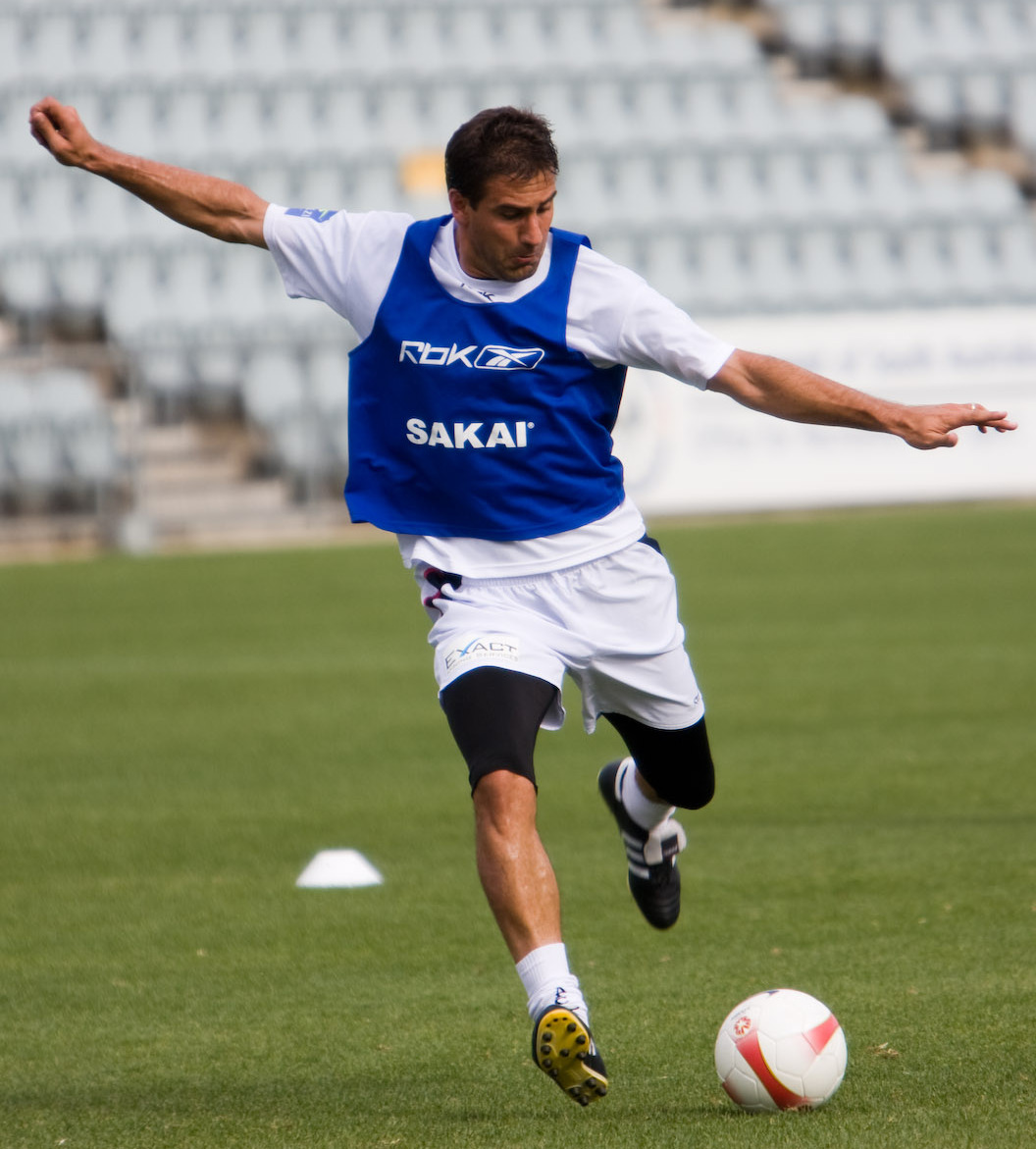
Paul Agostino

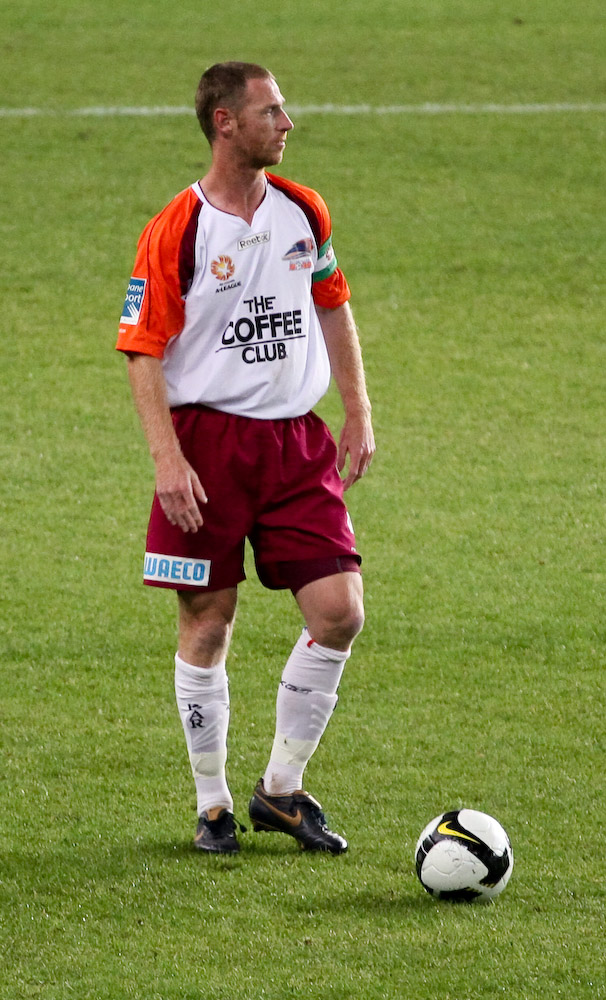
Craig Moore

- Paul Agostino – 1860 Munich – 1997–2004
- Michael Beauchamp – 1. FC Nürnberg – 2006–08
- Brandon Borrello – SC Freiburg – 2019–20
- Hayden Foxe – Arminia Bielefeld – 1997–98
- Ajdin Hrustic – Eintracht Frankfurt – 2020–22
- Jackson Irvine – FC St. Pauli – 2024–26
- Frank Juric – Bayer Leverkusen, Hannover 96 – 1999–2001, 2002–03, 2005–06
- Joshua Kennedy – VfL Wolfsburg, 1. FC Köln, 1. FC Nürnberg, Karlsruher SC – 2000–02, 2003–04, 2006–09
- Robbie Kruse – Fortuna Düsseldorf, Bayer Leverkusen, VfB Stuttgart – 2012–16
- Alou Kuol – VfB Stuttgart – 2022–23
- Mitchell Langerak – Borussia Dortmund, VfB Stuttgart – 2010–16
- Mathew Leckie – Borussia M'gladbach, FC Ingolstadt, Hertha BSC – 2011–12, 2015–21
- Connor Metcalfe – FC St. Pauli – 2024–26
- David Mitchell – Eintracht Frankfurt – 1985–87
- Craig Moore – Borussia M'gladbach – 2004–05
- Damian Mori – Borussia M'gladbach – 1996–97
- **Paul Okon-Engstler** – **1. FC Köln** – 2026–
- Nikita Rukavytsya – Hertha BSC, Mainz 05 – 2011–13
- Mark Schwarzer – Dynamo Dresden, 1. FC Kaiserslautern – 1994–96
- Matthew Špiranović – 1. FC Nürnberg – 2006–08, 2009–10
- George Timotheou – Schalke 04 – 2018–19
- Dario Vidošić – 1. FC Nürnberg – 2007–08, 2009–11
- David Zdrilić – SSV Ulm, SpVgg Unterhaching – 1999–2001
- Ned Zelic – Borussia Dortmund, Eintracht Frankfurt, 1860 Munich – 1992–96, 1997–2002

=== Cambodia ===
- Chhunly Pagenburg – 1. FC Nürnberg – 2005–08

=== China PR ===
- Hao Junmin – Schalke 04 – 2009–11
- Shao Jiayi – 1860 Munich, Energie Cottbus – 2002–04, 2006–09
- Yang Chen – Eintracht Frankfurt – 1998–2001

=== Indonesia ===
- **Kevin Diks** – **Borussia M'gladbach** – 2025–

=== Iran ===
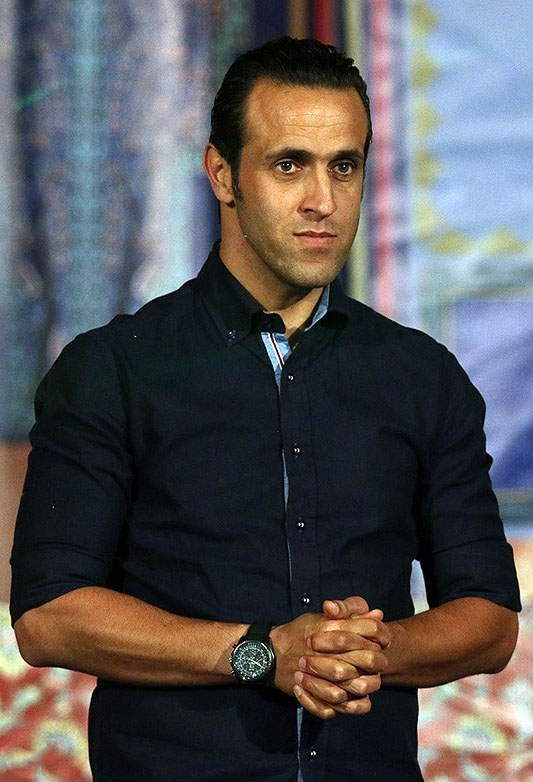
Ali Karimi, top scorer in 2005-11

- Sardar Azmoun – Bayer Leverkusen – 2021–23
- Karim Bagheri – Arminia Bielefeld – 1997–99
- Khodadad Azizi – 1. FC Köln – 1997–98
- Ali Daei – Arminia Bielefeld, Bayern Munich, Hertha BSC – 1997–2002
- Mehdi Mahdavikia – VfL Bochum, Hamburger SV, Eintracht Frankfurt – 1999–2010
- Vahid Hashemian – Hamburger SV, VfL Bochum, Bayern Munich, Hannover 96 – 1999–2010
- Rasoul Khatibi – Hamburger SV – 1999–2000
- Alireza Mansourian – FC St. Pauli – 2001–02
- Ferydoon Zandi – 1.FC Kaiserslautern – 2004–06
- Ashkan Dejagah – Hertha BSC, VfL Wolfsburg – 2004–13
- Ali Karimi – Bayern Munich, Schalke 04 – 2005–07, 2011
- Amir Shapourzadeh – Hansa Rostock – 2005–06, 2007–08
- Daniel Davari – Eintracht Braunschweig – 2013–14

=== Japan ===
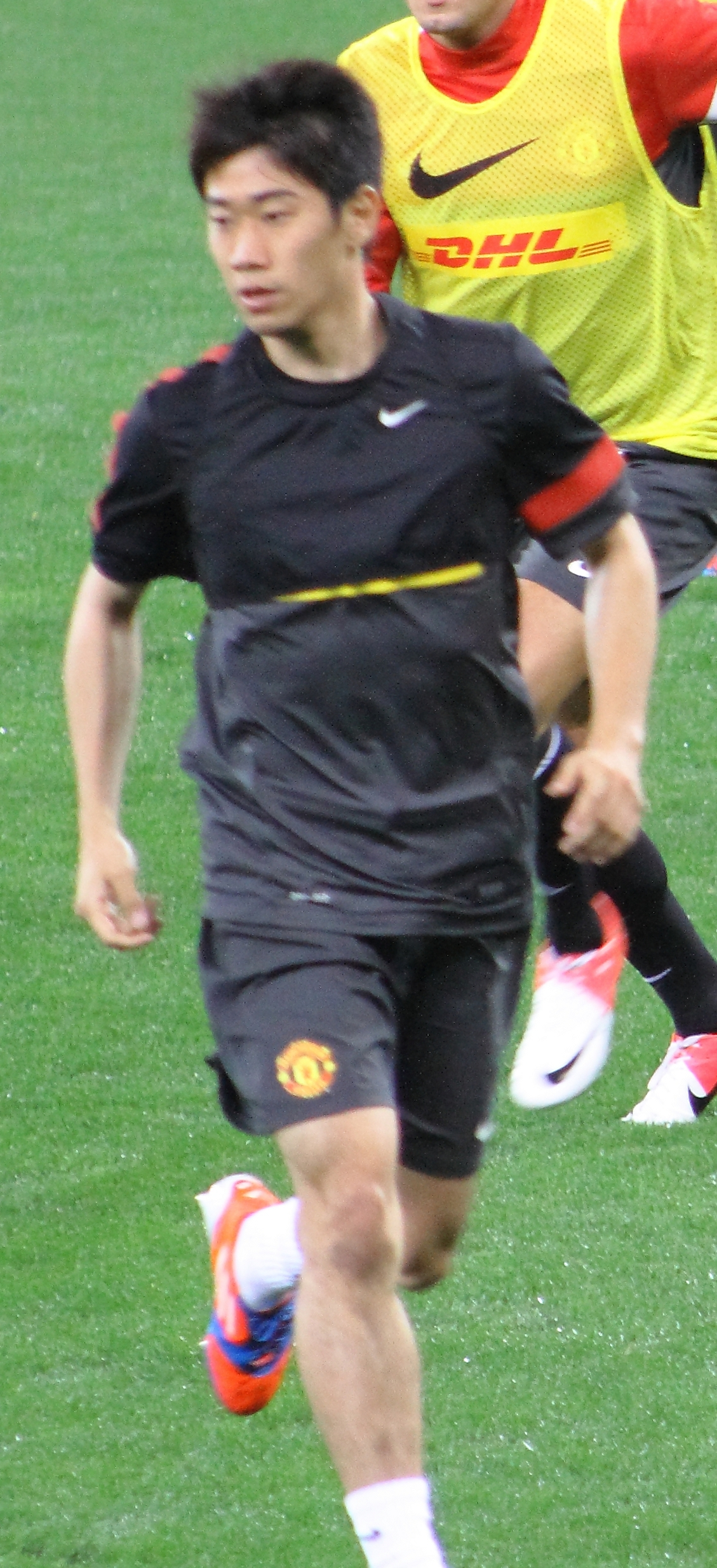
Attacking midfielder Shinji Kagawa played a key role in Borussia Dortmund's championships 10–11 and 11–12.

- Tomoya Ando – FC St. Pauli – 2025–26
- Takuma Asano – VfB Stuttgart, Hannover 96, VfL Bochum – 2017–19, 2021–24
- Anrie Chase – VfB Stuttgart – 2024–25
- **Ritsu Dōan** – Arminia Bielefeld, SC Freiburg, **Eintracht Frankfurt** – 2020–21, 2022–
- Keita Endō – Union Berlin – 2020–22
- Wataru Endo – VfB Stuttgart – 2020–23
- Joel Chima Fujita – FC St. Pauli – 2025–26
- Shiō Fukuda – Borussia M'gladbach – 2023–25
- **Keisuke Gotō** – **SC Freiburg** – 2026–
- Taichi Hara – FC St. Pauli – 2025–26
- Genki Haraguchi – Hertha BSC, Hannover 96, Union Berlin, VfB Stuttgart – 2014–19, 2021–24
- Makoto Hasebe – VfL Wolfsburg, 1. FC Nürnberg, Eintracht Frankfurt – 2007–24
- **Daiki Hashioka** – **Borussia M'gladbach** – 2026–
- Hajime Hosogai – FC Augsburg, Bayer Leverkusen, Hertha BSC – 2011–15
- Junichi Inamoto – Eintracht Frankfurt – 2007–09
- Takashi Inui – Eintracht Frankfurt – 2012–16
- **Kō Itakura** – **Borussia M'gladbach** – 2022–25, 2026–
- **Hiroki Itō** – VfB Stuttgart, **Bayern Munich** – 2021–
- Tatsuya Itō – Hamburger SV – 2017–18
- Shinji Kagawa – Borussia Dortmund – 2010–12, 2014–19
- Daichi Kamada – Eintracht Frankfurt – 2017–18, 2019–23
- Mu Kanazaki – 1. FC Nürnberg – 2012–13
- **Sōta Kawasaki** – **Mainz 05** – 2025–
- Hiroshi Kiyotake – 1. FC Nürnberg, Hannover 96 – 2012–16
- **Keita Kosugi** – **Eintracht Frankfurt** – 2026–
- Sōichirō Kōzuki – Schalke 04 – 2022–23
- Yuya Kubo – 1. FC Nürnberg – 2018–19
- **Kōki Machida** – **TSG Hoffenheim** – 2025–
- **Shūto Machino** – Holstein Kiel, **Borussia M'gladbach** – 2024–
- Tomoaki Makino – 1. FC Köln – 2010–12
- Mitsuru Maruoka – Borussia Dortmund – 2014–15
- Kōji Miyoshi – VfL Bochum – 2024–25
- Yoshinori Muto – Mainz 05 – 2015–18
- Kazuki Nagasawa – 1. FC Köln – 2014–16
- Shinji Okazaki – VfB Stuttgart, Mainz 05 – 2010–15
- Yoshito Ōkubo – VfL Wolfsburg – 2008–09
- Yasuhiko Okudera – 1. FC Köln, Werder Bremen – 1977–86
- Masaya Okugawa – Arminia Bielefeld, FC Augsburg – 2020–22, 2023–24
- Genki Omae – Fortuna Düsseldorf – 2012–13
- Shinji Ono – VfL Bochum – 2007–10
- Yuya Osako – 1. FC Köln, Werder Bremen – 2014–21
- Yūki Ōtsu – Borussia M'gladbach – 2011–12
- Kazuo Ozaki – Arminia Bielefeld, FC St. Pauli – 1983–85, 1988–89
- Gōtoku Sakai – VfB Stuttgart, Hamburger SV – 2011–18
- Hiroki Sakai – Hannover 96 – 2012–16
- **Kaishū Sano** – **Mainz 05** – 2024–
- Kento Shiogai – VfL Wolfsburg – 2025–26
- Yukinari Sugawara – Werder Bremen – 2025–26
- **Yuito Suzuki** – **SC Freiburg** – 2025–
- Naohiro Takahara – Hamburger SV, Eintracht Frankfurt – 2002–08
- Kōta Takai – Borussia M'gladbach – 2025–26
- **Satoshi Tanaka** – **Schalke 04** – 2026–
- **Rihito Yamamoto** – **SC Freiburg** – 2026–
- Atsuto Uchida – Schalke 04 – 2010–15
- **Zento Uno** – **Borussia M'gladbach** – 2026–
- Takashi Usami – Bayern Munich, TSG Hoffenheim, FC Augsburg, Fortuna Düsseldorf – 2011–13, 2016–17, 2018–19
- Hotaru Yamaguchi – Hannover 96 – 2015–16
- Kisho Yano – SC Freiburg – 2010–11
- Maya Yoshida – Schalke 04 – 2022–23

=== Korea DPR ===
- Jong Tae-se – 1. FC Köln – 2011–12

=== Korea Republic ===
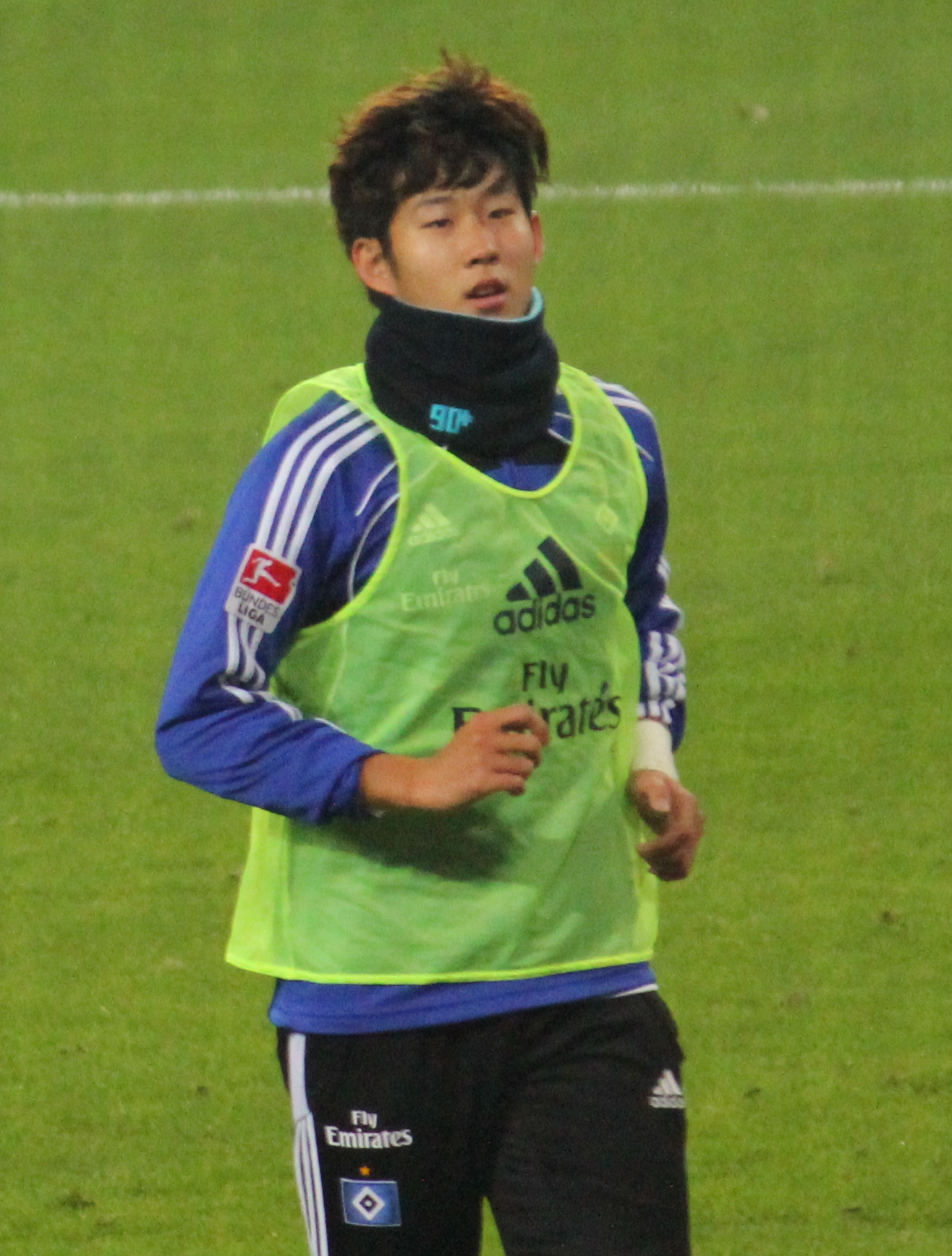
Son Heung-min playing for Hamburger SV in 2011

- Ahn Jung-hwan – MSV Duisburg – 2005–06
- **Jens Castrop** – **Borussia M'gladbach** – 2025–
- Cha Bum-kun – Darmstadt 98, Eintracht Frankfurt, Bayer Leverkusen – 1978–89
- Cha Du-ri – Arminia Bielefeld, Eintracht Frankfurt, Mainz 05, SC Freiburg, Fortuna Düsseldorf – 2002–04, 2005–07, 2009–10, 2012–13
- Hong Hyun-seok – Mainz 05 – 2024–25
- Hong Jeong-ho – FC Augsburg – 2013–16
- **Hwang Hee-chan** – RB Leipzig, **Schalke 04** – 2020–22, 2026–
- **Jeong Woo-yeong** – Bayern Munich, SC Freiburg, VfB Stuttgart, **Union Berlin** – 2018–19, 2020–
- Ji Dong-won – FC Augsburg, Mainz 05 – 2012–21
- Kim Jin-su – TSG Hoffenheim – 2014–16
- Kim Joo-sung – VfL Bochum – 1992–93
- **Kim Min-jae** – **Bayern Munich** – 2023–
- Koo Ja-cheol – VfL Wolfsburg, FC Augsburg, Mainz 05 – 2010–19
- Kwon Chang-hoon – SC Freiburg – 2019–21
- Lee Dong-gook – Werder Bremen – 2000–01
- Lee Dong-jun – Hertha BSC – 2021–22
- **Lee Jae-sung** – **Mainz 05** – 2021–
- Lee Young-pyo – Borussia Dortmund – 2008–09
- Park Joo-ho – Mainz 05, Borussia Dortmund – 2013–17
- Park Jung-bin – Greuther Fürth – 2012–13
- Park Sang-in – MSV Duisburg – 1981–82
- Ryu Seung-woo – Bayer Leverkusen – 2013–14
- **Seol Young-woo** – **FC Augsburg** – 2026–
- Son Heung-min – Hamburger SV, Bayer Leverkusen – 2010–16

=== Lebanon ===
- Roda Antar – Hamburger SV, SC Freiburg, 1. FC Köln – 2001–05, 2008–09
- Youssef Mohamad – SC Freiburg, 1. FC Köln – 2004–05, 2008–11

=== Philippines ===
- Dennis Cagara – Hertha BSC – 2003–04
- Gerrit Holtmann – Mainz 05, SC Paderborn, VfL Bochum, SV Darmstadt – 2016–20, 2021–25
- **Raphael Obermair** – **SC Paderborn** – 2026–
- Stephan Schröck – TSG Hoffenheim, Eintracht Frankfurt – 2012–14
- Denis Wolf – Hannover 96 – 2003–04

=== Tajikistan ===
- Alexander Huber – Eintracht Frankfurt – 2006–07

=== Thailand ===
- Witthaya Hloagune – Hertha BSC – 1979–80
- **Nicholas Mickelson** – **SV Elversberg** – 2026–

== CONCACAF ==
=== Canada ===
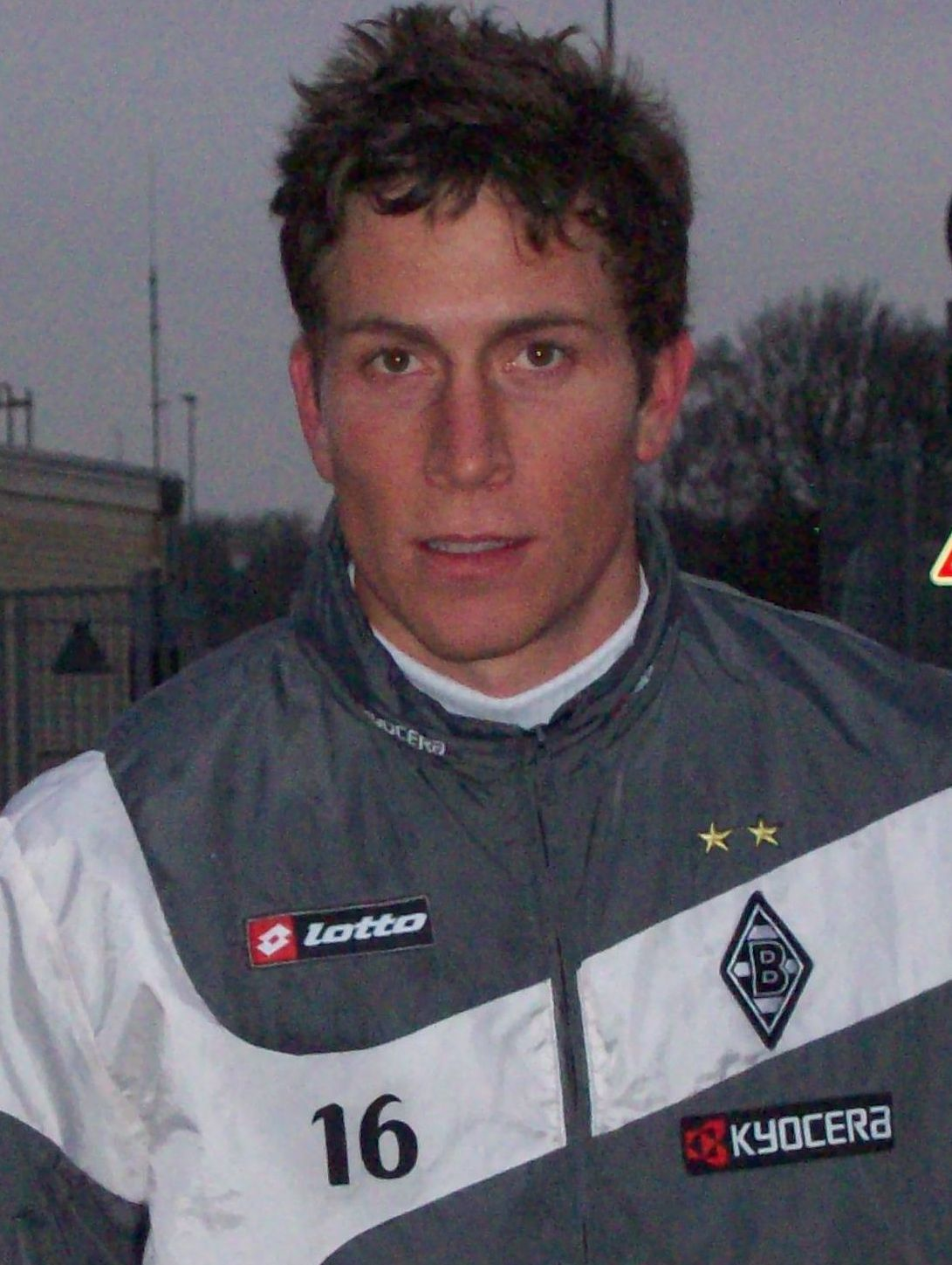
Rob Friend, top scorer in 2008-09

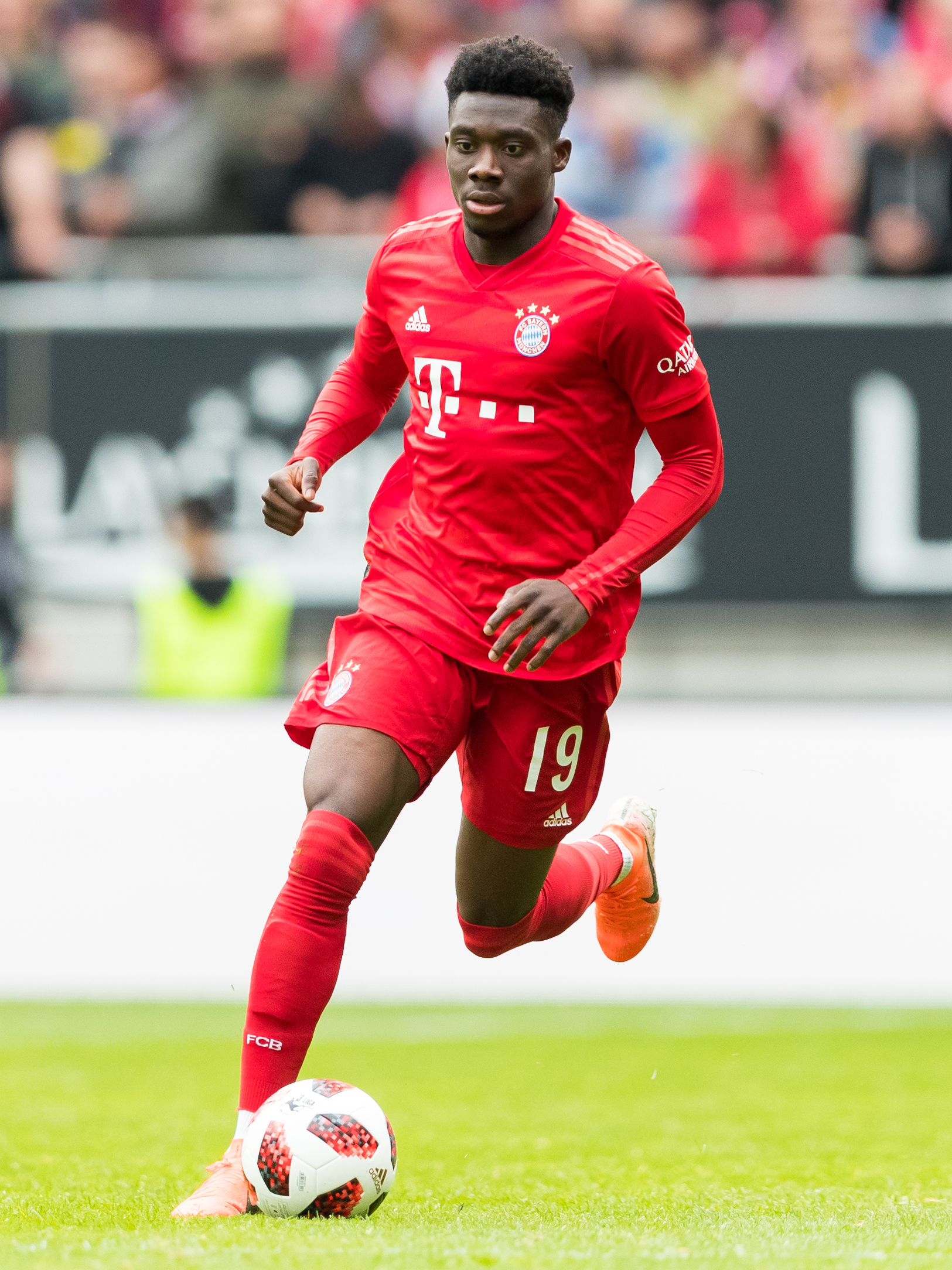
Alphonso Davies

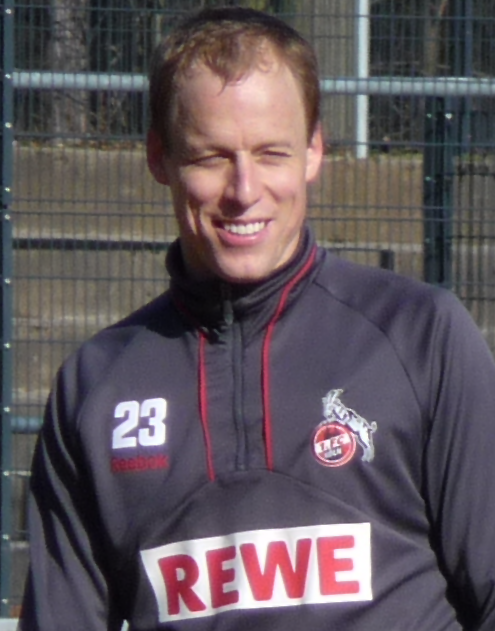
Kevin McKenna in 2010

- **Alphonso Davies** – **Bayern Munich** – 2018–
- Rob Friend – Borussia M'gladbach – 2008–10
- Julian de Guzman – Hannover 96 – 2002–05
- Daniel Imhof – VfL Bochum – 2006–10
- Simeon Jackson – Eintracht Braunschweig – 2013–14
- Marcel de Jong – FC Augsburg – 2011–15
- Kevin McKenna – Energie Cottbus, 1. FC Köln – 2000–01, 2006–07, 2008–12
- Olivier Occéan – Eintracht Frankfurt – 2012–13
- Paul Stalteri – Werder Bremen, Borussia M'gladbach – 2000–05, 2008–10

=== Costa Rica ===
- Austin Berry – SC Freiburg – 1993–94
- Juan Cayasso – Stuttgarter Kickers – 1991–92
- Júnior Díaz – Mainz 05, Darmstadt 98 – 2012–16
- Cristian Gamboa – VfL Bochum – 2021–25

=== Curaçao ===
- Riechedly Bazoer – VfL Wolfsburg – 2016–18
- Tahith Chong – Werder Bremen – 2020–21

=== Dominican Republic ===
- Jimmy Kaparos – Schalke 04 – 2020–21

=== Guadeloupe ===
- Jérôme Roussillon – VfL Wolfsburg, Union Berlin – 2018–25

=== Haiti ===
- Kenny Quetant - Werder Bremen - 2026

=== Jamaica ===
- Leon Bailey – Bayer Leverkusen – 2016–21
- Daniel Gordon – Borussia Dortmund – 2006–08
- Demarai Gray – Bayer Leverkusen – 2020–21
- **Mekhi Gray** – **Union Berlin** – 2026–
- Michael Hector – Eintracht Frankfurt – 2016–17
- Ricky-Jade Jones – FC St. Pauli – 2025–26

=== Martinique ===
- Johan Audel – Vfb Stuttgart – 2010–13

=== Mexico ===
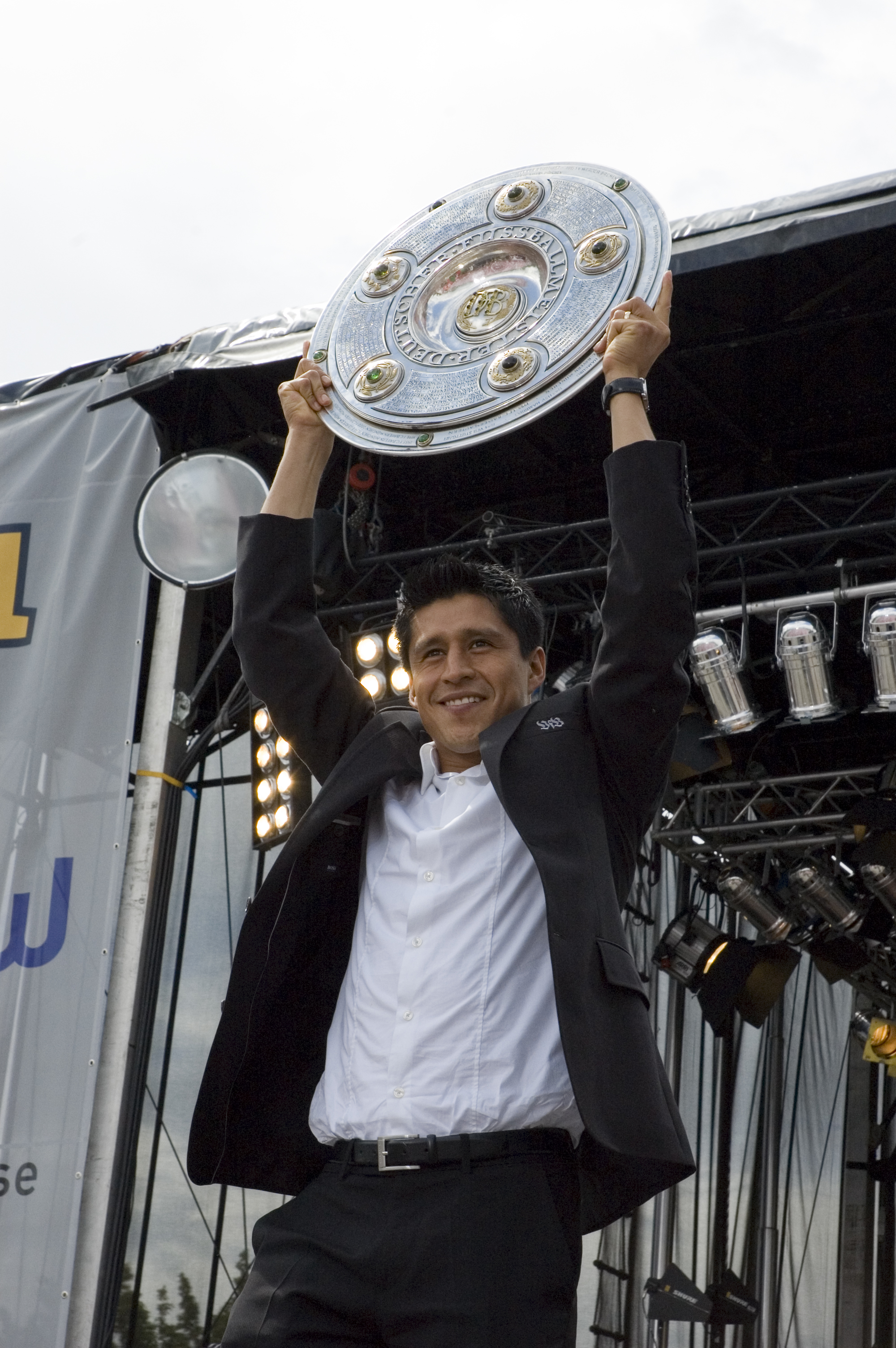
Ricardo Osorio in 2007

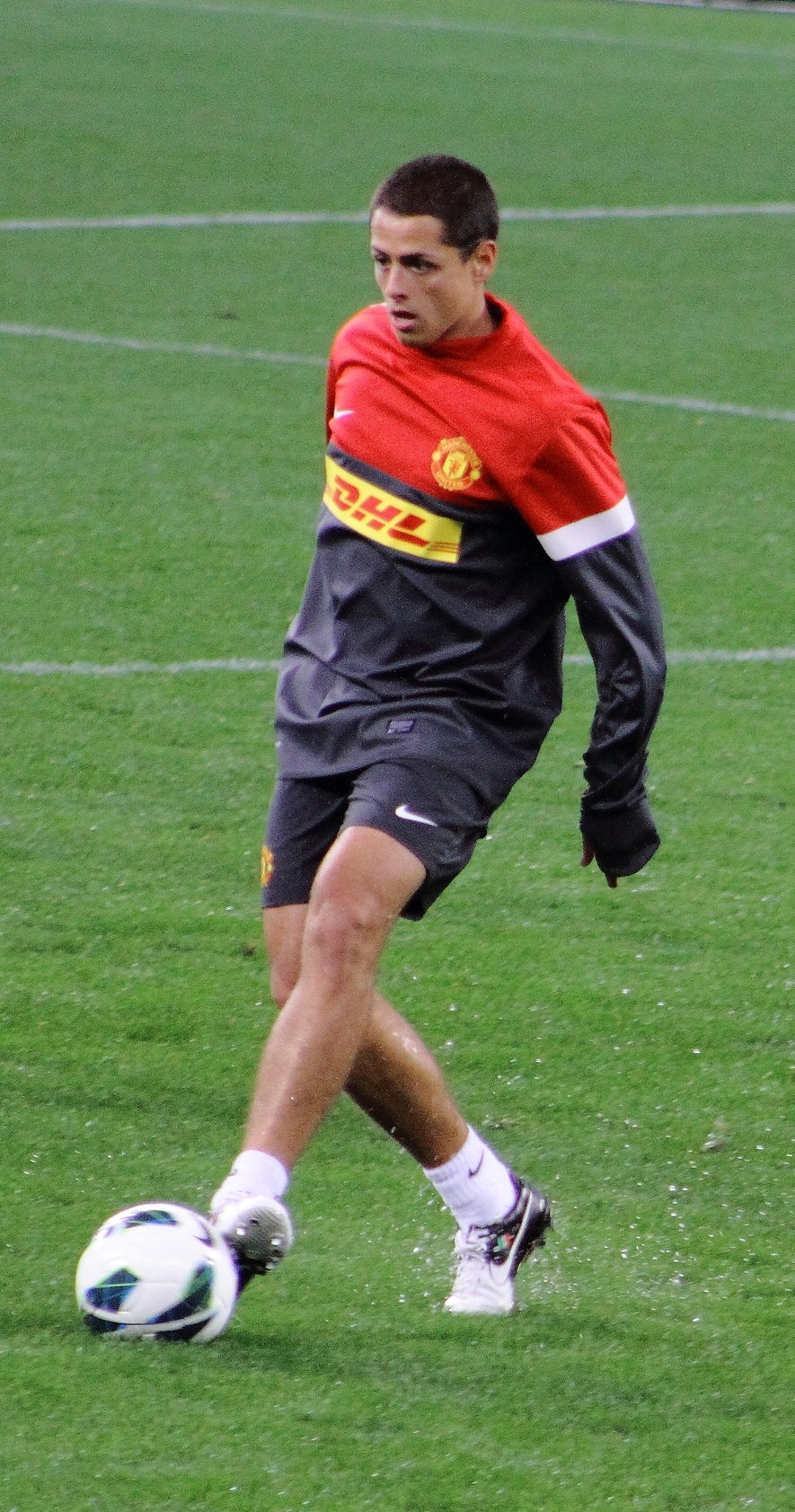
Javier Hernández

- Marco Fabián – Eintracht Frankfurt – 2015–19
- Aarón Galindo – Eintracht Frankfurt – 2007–09
- Andrés Guardado – Bayer Leverkusen – 2013–14
- Javier Hernández – Bayer Leverkusen – 2015–17
- Ricardo Osorio – VfB Stuttgart – 2006–10
- Pável Pardo – VfB Stuttgart – 2006–09
- Francisco Rodríguez – VfB Stuttgart – 2011–13
- Carlos Salcedo – Eintracht Frankfurt – 2017–19

=== Panama ===
- Andrés Andrade – Arminia Bielefeld – 2021–22

=== Suriname ===
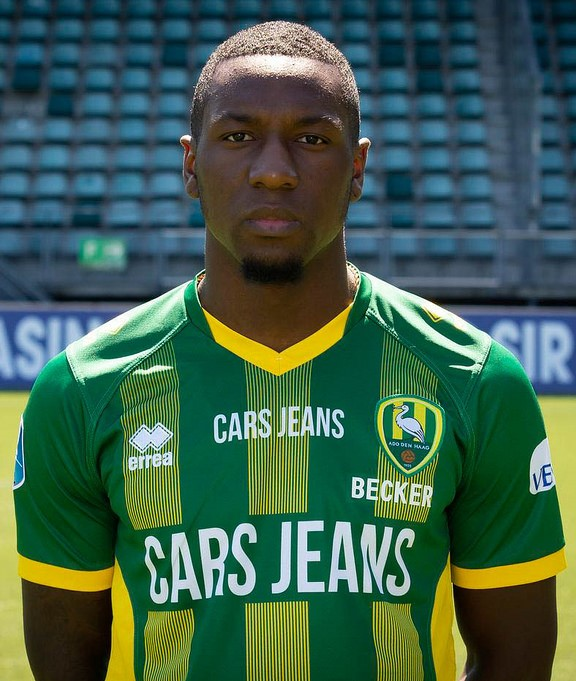
Sheraldo Becker

- **Sheraldo Becker** – Union Berlin, **Mainz 05** – 2019–24, 2025–
- Jean-Paul Boëtius – Mainz 05, Hertha BSC – 2018–23
- Immanuel Pherai – Borussia Dortmund – 2021–22

=== Trinidad and Tobago ===
- Evans Wise – SSV Ulm – 1999–2000

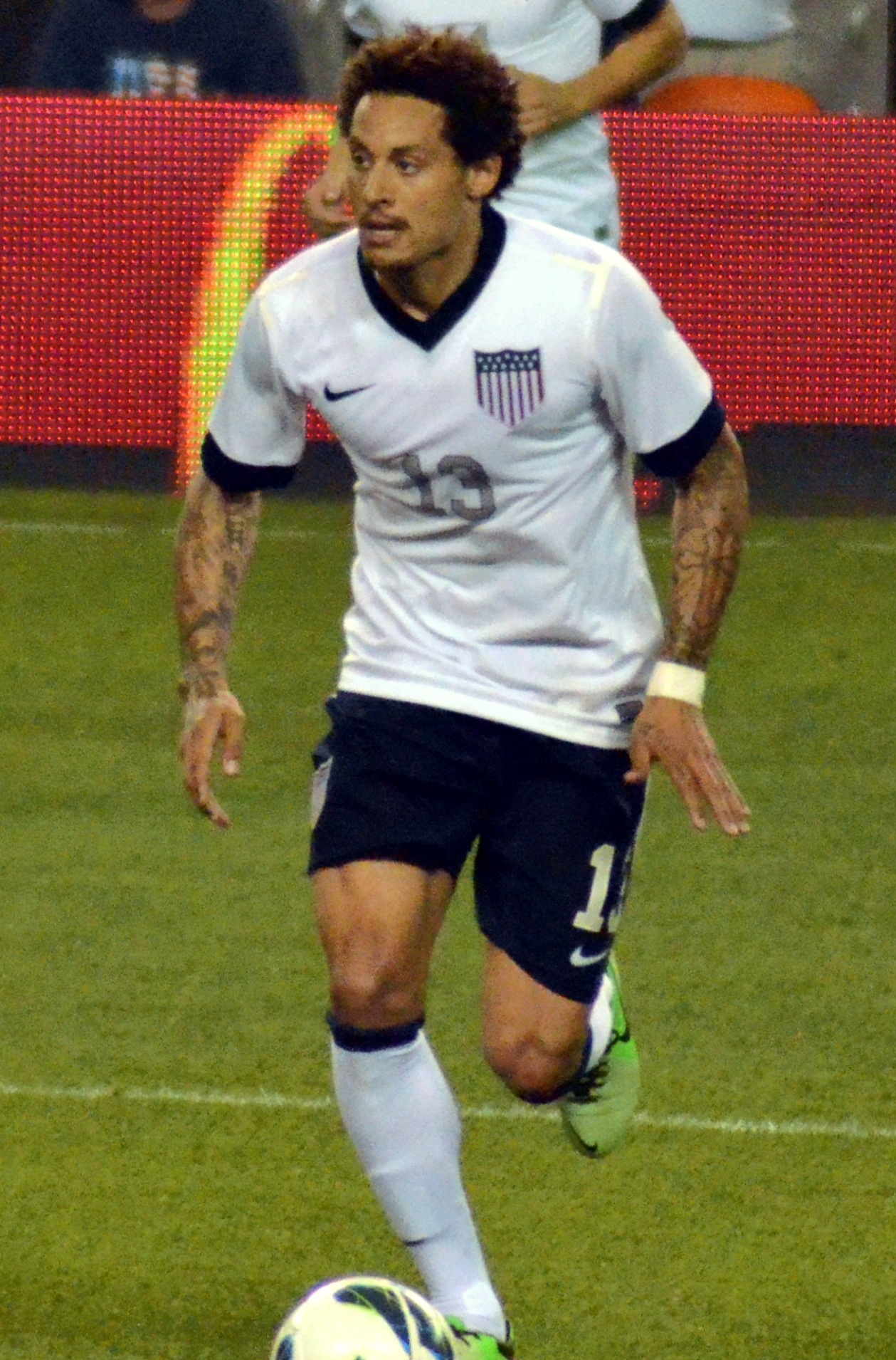
Jermaine Jones, International for Germany and the United States

=== United States ===
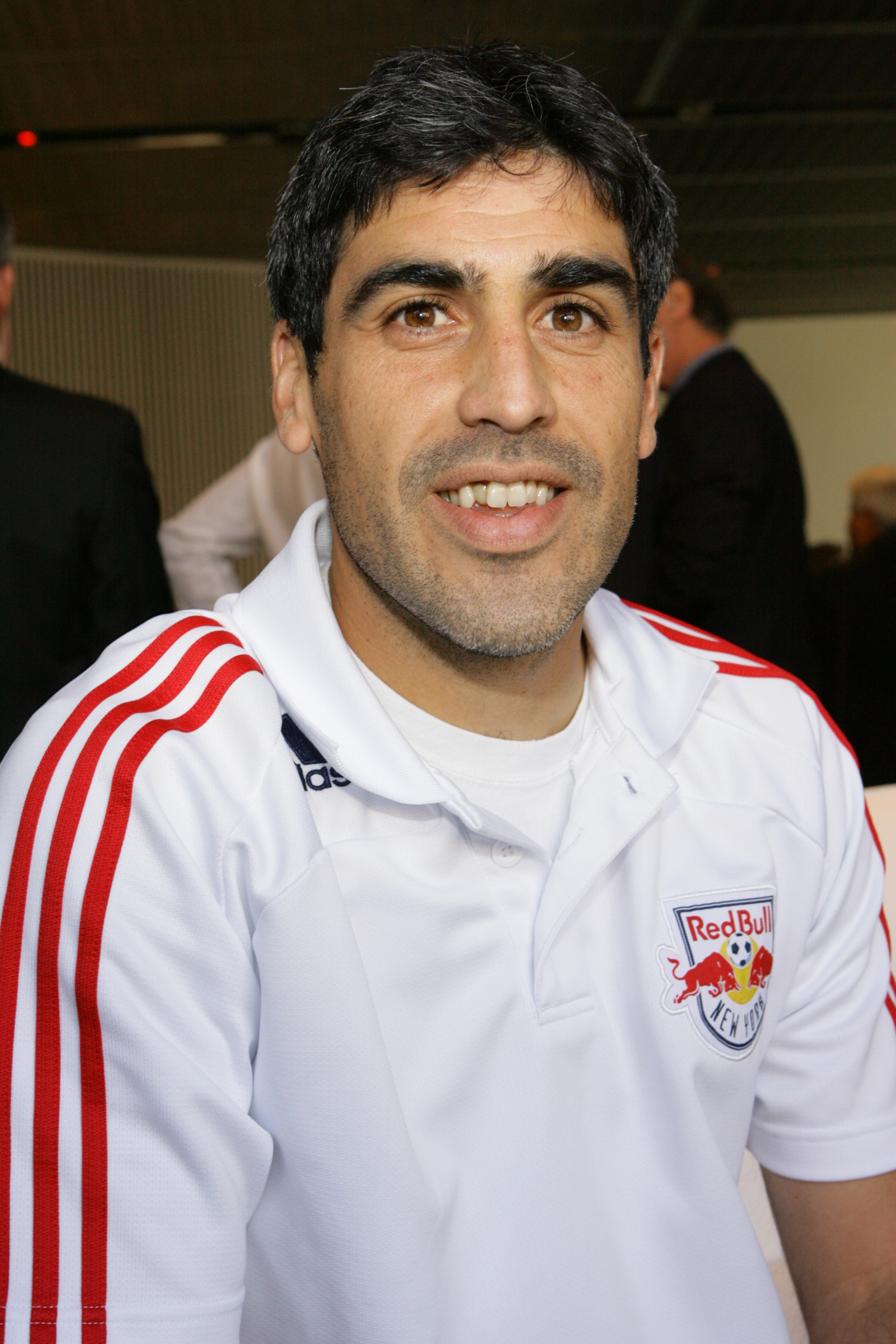
Claudio Reyna

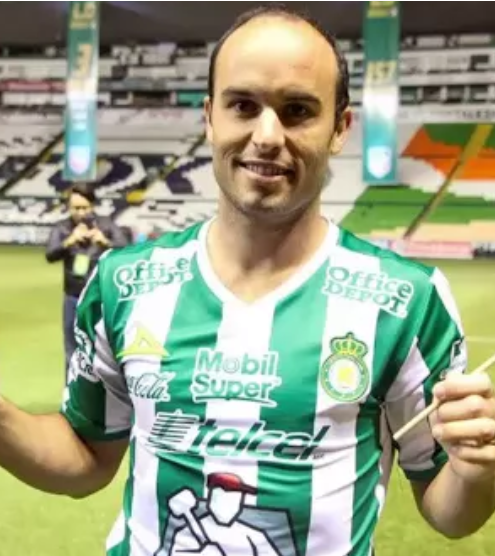
Landon Donovan

- Brenden Aaronson – Union Berlin – 2023–24
- Paxten Aaronson – Eintracht Frankfurt – 2022–24
- Tyler Adams – RB Leipzig – 2018–22
- **Mathis Albert** – **Borussia Dortmund** – 2025–
- Bryan Arguez – Hertha BSC – 2007–08
- **Noahkai Banks** – **FC Augsburg** – 2024–
- DaMarcus Beasley – Hannover 96 – 2010–11
- George Bello – Arminia Bielefeld – 2021–22
- Gregg Berhalter – Energie Cottbus – 2002–03
- Terrence Boyd – Darmstadt 98 – 2016–17
- Michael Bradley – Borussia M'gladbach – 2008–11
- John Brooks – Hertha BSC, VfL Wolfsburg, TSG Hoffenheim – 2013–24
- John van Buskirk – KFC Uerdingen – 1995–96
- Paul Caligiuri – FC St. Pauli – 1995–96
- **Cole Campbell** – Borussia Dortmund, **SV Elversberg** – 2024–
- Russell Canouse – TSG Hoffenheim – 2015–16
- Conor Casey – Borussia Dortmund, Hannover 96, Mainz 05 – 2002–03, 2004–07
- **Santiago Castañeda** – **SC Paderborn** – 2026–
- **Timothy Chandler** – 1. FC Nürnberg, **Eintracht Frankfurt** – 2010–
- Justin Che – TSG Hoffenheim – 2021–23
- Steve Cherundolo – Hannover 96 – 2002–14
- Ricardo Clark – Eintracht Frankfurt – 2009–11
- Chad Deering – Schalke 04, VfL Wolfsburg – 1993–94, 1997–98
- Landon Donovan – Bayer Leverkusen, Bayern Munich – 2004–05, 2008–09
- Thomas Dooley – FC Homburg, 1. FC Kaiserslautern, Bayer Leverkusen, Schalke 04 – 1986–93, 1994–97
- Damion Downs – 1. FC Köln – 2023–24
- John Doyle – VfB Leipzig – 1993–94
- Benny Feilhaber – Hamburger SV – 2006–07
- Cory Gibbs – FC St. Pauli – 2001–02
- Julian Green – Hamburger SV, Greuther Fürth – 2014–15, 2021–22
- Joseph-Claude Gyau – TSG Hoffenheim, Borussia Dortmund – 2013–15
- Frankie Hejduk – Bayer Leverkusen – 1998–2001
- Kamani Hill – VfL Wolfsburg – 2006–07
- Matthew Hoppe – Schalke 04 – 2020–21
- **Joel Imasuen** – **Werder Bremen** – 2023–
- Aron Jóhannsson – Werder Bremen – 2015–19
- Fabian Johnson – VfL Wolfsburg, TSG Hoffenheim, Borussia M'gladbach – 2009–20
- Jermaine Jones – Eintracht Frankfurt, Bayer Leverkusen, Schalke 04 – 2000–01, 2003–14
- Kasey Keller – Borussia M'gladbach – 2004–07
- Jerome Kiesewetter – VfB Stuttgart – 2014–15
- Jovan Kirovski – Borussia Dortmund – 1996–98
- **Kristoffer Lund** – **1. FC Köln** – 2025–
- **Lennard Maloney** – Borussia Dortmund, 1. FC Heidenheim, **Mainz 05** – 2021–22, 2023–
- Michael Mason – Hamburger SV – 1994–97
- Andy Mate – Hamburger SV – 1964–65
- Clint Mathis – Hannover 96 – 2003–05
- Weston McKennie – Schalke 04 – 2016–20
- Alfredo Morales – Hertha BSC, FC Ingolstadt, Fortuna Düsseldorf – 2011–12, 2015–17, 2018–20
- Matt Okoh – 1860 Munich – 1996–97
- Kevin Paredes – VfL Wolfsburg – 2021–26
- Michael Parkhurst – FC Augsburg – 2012–13
- Heath Pearce – Hansa Rostock – 2007–08
- Jordan Pefok – Union Berlin, Borussia M'gladbach – 2022–25
- Ricardo Pepi – FC Augsburg – 2021–23
- Christian Pulisic – Borussia Dortmund – 2015–19
- David Regis – Karlsruher SC – 1997–98
- Claudio Reyna – Bayer Leverkusen, VfL Wolfsburg – 1995–99
- **Giovanni Reyna** – Borussia Dortmund, **Borussia M'gladbach** – 2019–
- Chris Richards – Bayern Munich, TSG Hoffenheim – 2019–22
- James Sands – FC St. Pauli – 2024–26
- Anthony Sanneh – Hertha BSC, 1. FC Nürnberg – 1998–2003
- Josh Sargent – Werder Bremen – 2018–21
- **Joe Scally** – **Borussia M'gladbach** – 2021–
- Khiry Shelton – SC Paderborn – 2019–20
- Sebastian Soto – Hannover 96 – 2018–19
- Caleb Stanko – SC Freiburg – 2017–18
- **Malik Tillman** – Bayern Munich, **Bayer Leverkusen** – 2021–22, 2025–
- Timothy Tillman – 1. FC Nürnberg, Greuther Fürth – 2018–19, 2021–22
- John Tolkin – Holstein Kiel – 2024–25
- David Wagner – Eintracht Frankfurt, Schalke 04 – 1990–91, 1995–97
- Danny Williams – SC Freiburg, TSG Hoffenheim – 2009–13
- Bobby Wood – Hamburger SV, Hannover 96 – 2016–19
- Peter Woodring – Hamburger SV – 1992–94
- Andrew Wooten – 1. FC Kaiserslautern – 2011–12
- Haji Wright – Schalke 04 – 2017–19
- Eric Wynalda – 1. FC Saarbrücken, VfL Bochum – 1992–93, 1994–95
- David Yelldell – Bayer Leverkusen – 2015–16
- Salvatore Zizzo – Hannover 96 – 2007–10
- Zack Steffen – Fortuna Düsseldorf – 2019–20

== OFC ==
=== New Caledonia ===
- Angelo Fulgini – 1. FSV Mainz 05 – 2022–23

=== New Zealand ===
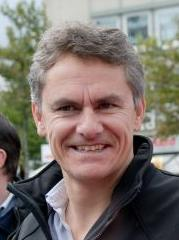
Wynton Rufer in 2009

- Wynton Rufer – Werder Bremen – 1989–95
- Sarpreet Singh – Bayern Munich – 2019–20

== See also ==
- List of Bundesliga players

== Summary ==
=== By continent ===
- Europe (UEFA)
- South America (CONMEBOL)
- Africa (CAF)
- Asia (AFC)
- North America (CONCACAF)
- Oceania (OFC)

=== By country ===
Algeria, (Azerbaijan) Azeribaijan Thailand, Japan, Republic of Ireland, Indonesia, North Macedonia, Ukraine, Iceland, Israel, Haiti, Austria, Albania, Croatia, Zambia, Zimbabwe, Morocco, (The Gambia) Gambia, Gabon, Senegal, Ivory Coast, Nigeria, Greece, Guinea-Bissau, Sierra Leone, Tunisia, Equatorial Guinea, Ghana, Algeria, Angola, Namibia, Moldova, Malta, Burkina Faso, Belarus, Kazakhstan, Luxembourg, Italy, Togo, Portugal, Kosovo, Tajikistan, Hungary, North Korea, South Korea, (Georgia (country)) Georgia, Iran, Philippines, Netherlands China Cambodia, (Suriname) Suriame, Panama, Denmark, Bulgaria, (Republic of the Congo) Congo, France, Bosnia and Herzegovina, Belgium, Czech Republic, Turkey, Norway, Montenegro, Jamaica, England, Mozambique, Serbia, Curaçao, Finland, Faroe Islands, Argentina, Armenia, Australia, Bolivia, Brazil, Canada, Chile, Colombia, Comoros, Costa Rica, Cyprus, (Democratic Republic of the Congo) DR Congo, Dominican Republic, Ecuador, Estonia, Guadeloupe, Latvia, Lithuania, Mexico, New Caledonia, New Zealand, Paraguay, Peru, Poland, Romania, Russia, Scotland, Seychelles, Slovakia, Slovenia, Spain, Sweden, Switzerland, South Africa, Trinidad and Tobago, Uganda, Uruguay, United States, Venezuela, Wales, Lebanon, Libya, (Liechtenstein) Liechenstein, Martinique

== Notes ==
Notes:

1. Born in Angola
2. Born in Argentina
3. Born in Australia
4. Born in Austria
5. Born in Azerbaijan (then part of the Soviet Union)
6. Born in Belarus (then part of the Soviet Union)
7. Born in Belgium
8. Born in Bosnia and Herzegovina
9. Born in Bosnia and Herzegovina (then part of SFR Yugoslavia)
10. Born in Bosnia and Herzegovina (then part of Kingdom of Yugoslavia)
11. Born in Brazil
12. Born in Cameroon
13. Born in Canada
14. Born in Croatia (then part of SFR Yugoslavia)
15. Born in Cape Verde
16. Born in Curaçao (constituent country of the Kingdom of the Netherlands, then part of the Netherlands Antilles)
17. Born in the Democratic Republic of Congo
18. Born in the Democratic Republic of Congo (then Zaïre)
19. Born in Denmark
20. Born in England
21. Born in France
22. Born in the French Guiana (Overseas territory of the French Republic)
23. Born in Gambia
24. Born in Germany
25. Born in Germany (then Allied-occupied Germany)
26. Born in Germany (then Nazi Germany)
27. Born in Germany (then West Germany)
28. Born in Ghana
29. Born in Greenland (autonomous country within the Kingdom of Denmark)
30. Born in Guadeloupe (Overseas department of the French Republic)
31. Born in Guinea-Bissau
32. Born in Hungary
33. Born in Indonesia
34. Born in Iraq
35. Born in Italy
36. Born in Ivory Coast
37. Born in Jamaica
38. Born in Japan
39. Born in Kosovo (then part of SFR Yugoslavia)
40. Born in Kyrgyzstan (then part of the Soviet Union)
41. Born in Latvia (then part of the Soviet Union)
42. Born in Lebanon
43. Born in Liberia
44. Born in Luxembourg
45. Born in Martinique (Overseas department of the French Republic)
46. Born in Mayotte (Overseas territory of the French Republic)
47. Born in Morocco
48. Born in Mozambique (then part of Portuguese Mozambique)
49. Born in Nazi Germany
50. Born in the Netherlands
51. Born in Nigeria
52. Born in North Macedonia (then part of SFR Yugoslavia)
53. Born in Norway
54. Born in Pakistan
55. Born in Portugal
56. Born in Réunion (Overseas department of the French Republic)
57. Born in Romania
58. Born in Russia (then part of the Soviet Union)
59. Born in Scotland
60. Born in Senegal
61. Born in Serbia (then part of SFR Yugoslavia)
62. Born in Serbia (then part of FR Yugoslavia)
63. Born in Sierra Leone
64. Born in Slovakia
65. Born in Slovakia (then part of Czechoslovakia)
66. Born in Slovenia (then part of SFR Yugoslavia)
67. Born in South Africa
68. Born in Spain
69. Born in Sudan
70. Born in Suriname
71. Born in Sweden
72. Born in Switzerland
73. Born in Tajikistan (then part of the Soviet Union)
74. Transylvanian Saxon. Born in Romania (then part of Hungary)
75. Born in the United States
76. Born in Ukraine (then part of the Soviet Union)
77. Born in Venezuela
78. Born in Zambia
79. Capped for the Albania national football team
80. Capped for the Albania national under-21 football team
81. Capped for the Albania national under-19 football team
82. Capped for the Albania national under-17 football team
83. Capped for the Austria national football team
84. Capped for the Belgium national under-21 football team
85. Capped for the Belgium national under-17 football team
86. Capped for the Belgium national under-16 football team
87. Capped for the Belgium national under-15 football team
88. Capped for the Bosnia and Herzegovina national under-17 football team
89. Capped for the Brazil national under-20 football team
90. Capped for the Brazil national under-18 football team
91. Capped for the Canada men's national under-20 soccer team
92. Capped for the Catalonia national football team
93. Capped for the Croatia national football team
94. Capped for the Croatia national under-21 football team
95. Capped for the Croatia national under-20 football team
96. Capped for the Colombia national under-20 football team
97. Capped for the Denmark national under-21 football team
98. Capped for the Denmark national under-20 football team
99. Capped for the Denmark national under-19 football team
100. Capped for the Denmark national under-18 football team
101. Capped for the Denmark national under-17 football team
102. Capped for the Denmark national under-16 football team
103. Capped for the DR Congo national football team
104. Capped for the England national under-21 football team
105. Capped for the England national under-20 football team
106. Capped for the England national under-19 football team
107. Capped for the England national under-18 football team
108. Capped for the England national under-17 football team
109. Capped for the England national under-16 football team
110. Capped for the France national football team
111. Capped for the France national football B team
112. Capped for the France national under-23 football team
113. Capped for the France national under-21 football team
114. Capped for the France national under-20 football team
115. Capped for the France national under-19 football team
116. Capped for the France national under-18 football team
117. Capped for the France national under-17 football team
118. Capped for the France national under-16 football team
119. Capped for the Galicia national football team
120. Capped for the Germany national football team
121. Capped for the Germany national football B team
122. Capped for the Germany national under-23 football team
123. Capped for the Germany national under-21 football team
124. Capped for the Germany national under-20 football team
125. Capped for the Germany national under-19 football team
126. Capped for the Germany national under-18 football team
127. Capped for the Germany national under-17 football team
128. Capped for the Germany national under-16 football team
129. Capped for the Germany national under-15 football team
130. Capped for the Iceland national under-21 football team
131. Capped for the Iceland national under-17 football team
132. Capped for the Kosovo national football team
133. Capped for the Netherlands national football team
134. Capped for the Netherlands national under-21 football team
135. Capped for the Netherlands national under-20 football team
136. Capped for the Netherlands national under-19 football team
137. Capped for the Netherlands national under-18 football team
138. Capped for the Netherlands national under-17 football team
139. Capped for the Netherlands national under-16 football team
140. Capped for the Netherlands national under-15 football team
141. Capped for the Norway national football team
142. Capped for the Norway national under-23 football team
143. Capped for the Norway national under-21 football team
144. Capped for the Norway national under-20 football team
145. Capped for the Norway national under-19 football team
146. Capped for the Norway national under-18 football team
147. Capped for the Norway national under-17 football team
148. Capped for the Norway national under-16 football team
149. Capped for the Norway national under-15 football team
150. Capped for the Padania national football team
151. Capped for the Portugal national football B team
152. Capped for the Portugal national under-21 football team
153. Capped for the Scotland national under-19 football team
154. Capped for the Senegal national under-17 football team
155. Capped for the Serbia and Montenegro national under-21 football team
156. Capped for the Serbia and Montenegro national under-18 football team
157. Capped for the Serbia national under-17 football team
158. Capped for the Spain national under-20 football team
159. Capped for the Spain national under-19 football team
160. Capped for the Spain national under-18 football team
161. Capped for the Spain national under-17 football team
162. Capped for the Spain national under-16 football team
163. Capped for the Sweden national football team
164. Capped for the Sweden national under-21 football team
165. Capped for the Sweden men's national under-19 football team
166. Capped for the Sweden men's national under-17 football team
167. Capped for the Switzerland national football team
168. Capped for the Switzerland national under-23 football team
169. Capped for the Switzerland national under-21 football team
170. Capped for the Switzerland national under-20 football team
171. Capped for the Switzerland national under-19 football team
172. Capped for the Switzerland national under-18 football team
173. Capped for the Switzerland national under-17 football team
174. Capped for the Switzerland national under-16 football team
175. Capped for the Switzerland national under-15 football team
176. Capped for the Tajikistan national football team
177. Capped for the United States national under-23 football team
178. Capped for the United States national under-20 football team
179. Capped for the United States national under-19 football team
180. Capped for the United States national under-17 football team
181. Capped for the Wales national under-21 football team
182. Capped for the Yugoslavia national under-21 football team
