= Alexandar Bonchev =

Bulgarian footballer

Alexander Bontchev
Personal information
- Full name: Alexander Bonchev Maznilkov
- Date of birth: 30 November 1965 (age 60)
- Place of birth: Bulgaria
- Positions: Winger; striker

Senior career*
Years	Team	Apps	(Gls)
-1991/92	FC Lokomotiv 1929 Sofia		
1991/92-1993	MSV Duisburg	2	(0)
1992-1993	SV Darmstadt 98→(loan)	17	(1)
1993/1994	PFC Levski Sofia	4	(0)
1994/1995	FC Carl Zeiss Jena	4	(0)
1995/1996	PFC Slavia Sofia		
- * Club domestic league appearances and goals

Alexandar Bonchev (Bulgarian: Александър Бончев; born 30 November 1965 in Bulgaria) is a Bulgarian retired footballer.
