= Totenkopf (Sauerland) =

Mountain in Germany

- Location within North Rhine-Westphalia

Highest point
- Elevation: 502.6 m above sea level (NHN) (1,649 ft)
- Coordinates: 51°27′16″N 8°47′05″E

Geography
- Location: Near Bleiwäsche; Hochsauerlandkreis, North Rhine-Westphalia (Germany)
- Parent range: Diemel Uplands

The Totenkopf is a hill 502.6 m above sea level (NHN), on the Brilon Heights in the counties of Hochsauerlandkreis and Paderborn, in the German state of North Rhine-Westphalia.

== Location ==
The Totenkopf, most of which is in the Sauerland and Diemel Uplands, is around 4.5 kilometres as the crow flies west of Marsberg on the Brilon Heights which surround the Brilon Plateau and, in the north, gradually transition via the Alme Uplands into the Sintfeld. It is located on the boundary between the Obermarsberg Forest in the east and the Madfeld Forest in the west.

The northern boundary of the Diemelsee Nature Park runs over the densely wooded summit of the Totenkopf. On its northern hillside, and thus on the side on which Bleiwäsche lies a few kilometres away, is the highest point (498 m) in the region of Ostwestfalen-Lippe and the county of Paderborn.

A number of streams rise on the Totenkopf and its spurs: the Große Aa, Kleine Aa, Dütlingsbach and Momeke. Just under 650 metres as the crow flies to the northeast of the summit is the Totenkopfstein monument. The so-called Totenkopfstein (i.e. Skull-Stone) was a boundary marker showing a skull and bones.

The highest hills in the vicinity of the Totenkopf, which are actually its spurs, are the Klettenberg (484.0 m; to the northeast), the Brülingskopf (437.0 m; to the southeast), the Brautlicht (498.7 m; to the southwest) and the Liebfrauenberg (ca. 490 m; to the southwest).

== Watersheds ==
The Rhine-Weser watershed runs over the Totenkopf. So while the waters of the Großen Aa and Kleine Aa, which are impounded a few kilometers north of the hill by the Aabach Dam to form the Aabach Reservoir, drain via the Aabach, Afte, Alme and Lippe in a predominantly northwesterly direction into the Rhine, the shorter streams that rise south of the Totenkopf drain via the Hoppecke and Diemel, or from the Momeke and Dütlingsbach straight into the Diemel, in a mainly northeasterly direction into the Weser.
