= Dreiskopf =

Mountain in Germany

Coordinates: 51°19′32″N 8°36′31″E

Highest point
- Elevation: 781 m (2,562 ft)

Geography
- Location: Landkreis Waldeck-Frankenberg, Hesse, Germany

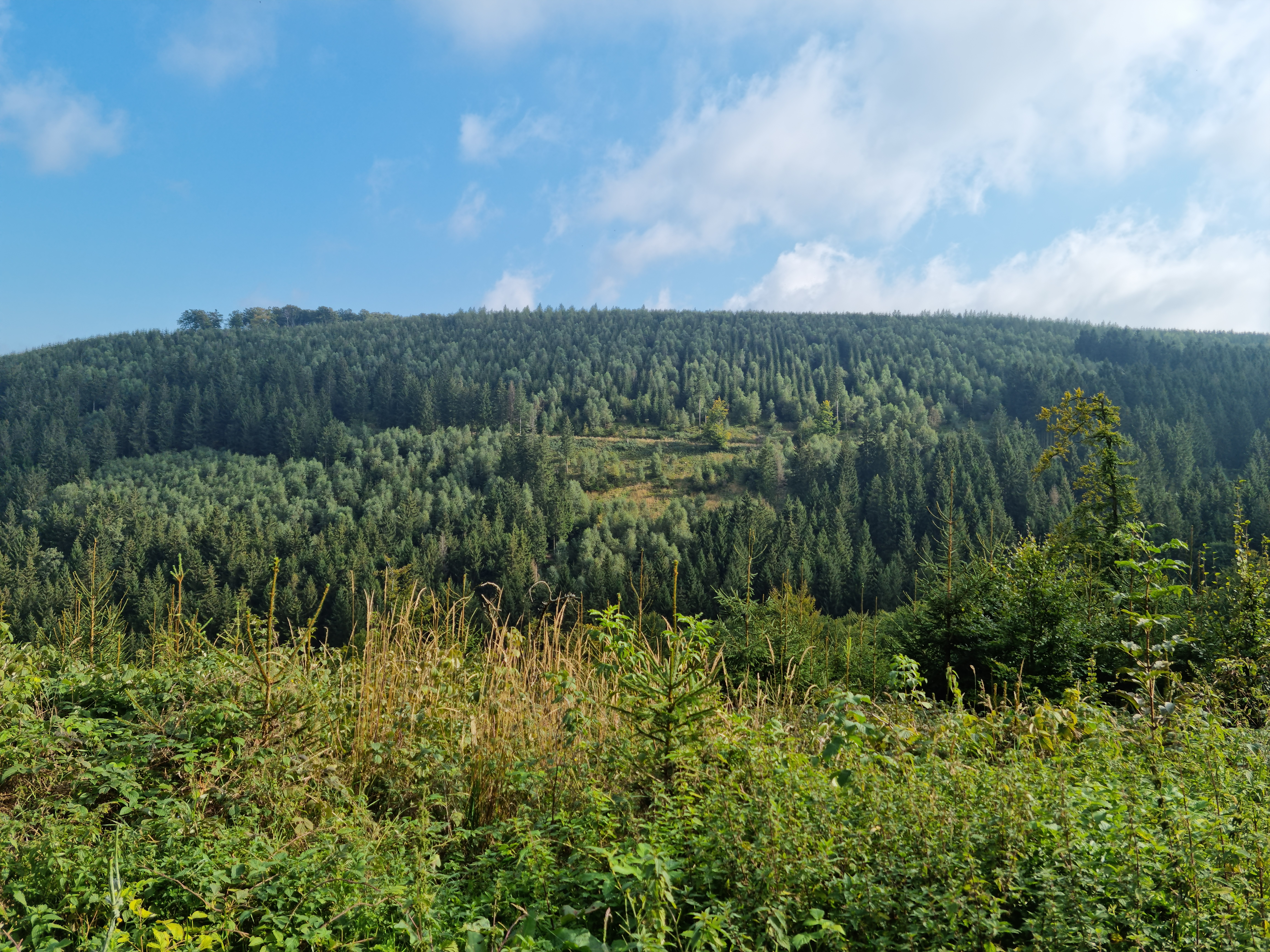
View from the eastern slope of the Fohrenkopf towards the Dreiskopf

Dreiskopf (also called Treiskopf ) is a mountain near Schwalefeld, in the Waldeck-Frankenberg district, in Hesse, Germany. It has an elevation of 779.8 m above sea level, and it's a part of the Rothaar Mountains.

== Geographical location ==
The Dreiskopf is located in the northeast part of the Rothaar Mountains on the border between Hochsauerland in the Westphalian Hochsauerlandkreis and Upland in the north Hessian district of Waldeck-Frankenberg. The mountain is located inside the Diemelsee nature park, and it's the highest point of the northern end of the mountain range, while Hohe Eimberg is the highest point on the southern end. Its summit lies on the state border, 3.5 km north of Willingen, 2.4 km north-northwest of Schwalefeld and 3 km southeast of Brilon.

The Dreiskopf, located in the Brilon Forest, is traversed by the Hoppecke in the west, which flows in a south-north direction, and by the Itter in the east, which runs in the same direction. Both rivers are tributaries of the Diemel. Both short source streams, the Jückenhohl and the Butterdelle, which are tributary to the Bremecke, arise to the northwest and northeast of the summit respectively.

On the Westphalian side of the Dreiskopf are parts of the Hoppecke-Diemel-Bergland nature reserve (CDDA no. 555554573; designated 2001; 77.9064 km² in size).

== Natural region ==
The Dreiskopf belongs in the natural region called Süder Uplands, of the Rhenish Massif in the German states of North Rhine-Westphalia and northwestern Hesse. The region flows to the northwest into the Habuch (333.83) natural area.

== Recorded height ==
The height of the three-headed summit was recorded on the official Brilon topographical map until the year 1900 as 781m, which was changed to 781.0 m in 1925 - as was the case for many mountains, the height of which was modified simply by adding a ".0" without further measurements. This value was also recorded in official map services until at least 2013. The more up-to-date and more accurate current German basemap from 2011 indicates 779.8m.
