= Kleine Aa (Aabach) =

River in Germany

Location
- Country: Germany
- State: North Rhine-Westphalia

Physical characteristics
- Mouth
  - location: Aabach
  - coordinates: 51.4902°N 8.7497°E
- Length: 5.5 km (3.4 mi)

Basin features
- Progression: Aabach→ Afte→ Alme→ Lippe→ Rhine→ North Sea

Kleine Aa (or the Little Aabach) is a river of North Rhine-Westphalia, Germany, a tributary of the Aabach. Thus it is part of the Rhine River Basin.

The Kleine Aa rises in East Westphalia 7 km north of the border to Hesse, between Bad Wunnenberg to the north-northwest and Marsberg in the east on the border between Brilon Plateau to the west and Sintfeld to the north. Its source is located 4.5 km west of Marsberg and about 5.4 km north-east of Brilon-Madfeld. Its water comes from a small wetland, located approximately 650 m northeast of the Totenkopf (502.6 m above sea level. NHN) on average 465 meters above sea level.

A few hundred meters northeast of the source of the Kleine Aa is the source of the Karpke ( "Cold Siepen"), not far south are the northern boundary of the nature park Diemelsee and the headwaters of Dütlingsbach. The sister stream of the Kleine Aa, the Große Aa, rises about 1.5 km south-west of its source.

The Kleine Aa flows generally north through a forested region between Obermarsberg, Madfeld and Fürstenberg, accompanied by forest roads and hiking trails. It feeds seven ponds and passes a former glassworks.

Finally, the Kleine Aa flows approximately 3 km south of Fürstenberg on 345.7 m elevation into the southeastern branch of the Aabachstausee, which is traversed by the Aabach. Since establishment of this small reservoir the last almost 800 m flow path of the stream to its former confluence with the Aabach are flooded by waters of the dam. Total Kleine Aa is therefore about 6.3 km long.

== See also ==
- List of rivers of North Rhine-Westphalia
