= Brilon Plateau =

Plateau in Germany

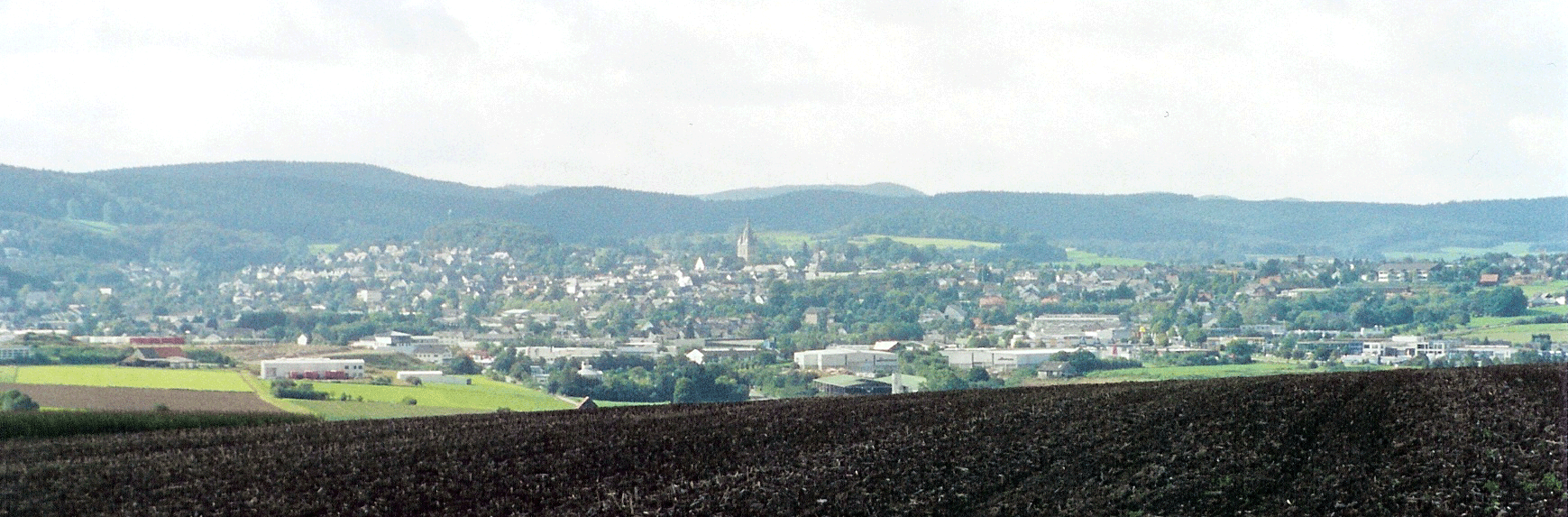
View looking southwest over the Brilon Plateau towards Brilon from between Wülfte and Thülen)

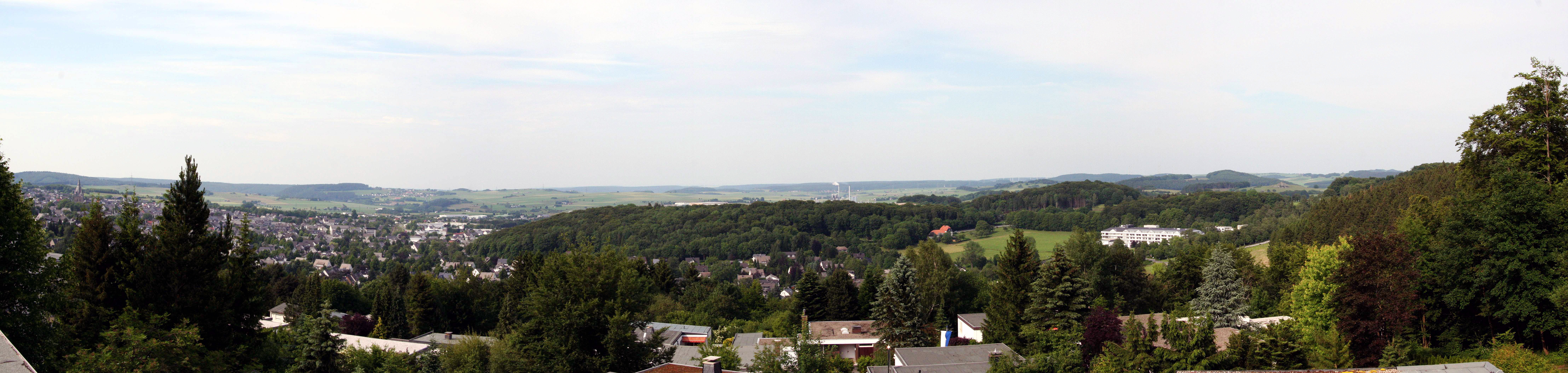
View from the Itzelstein on the edge of Brilon looking north across the Brilon Plateau

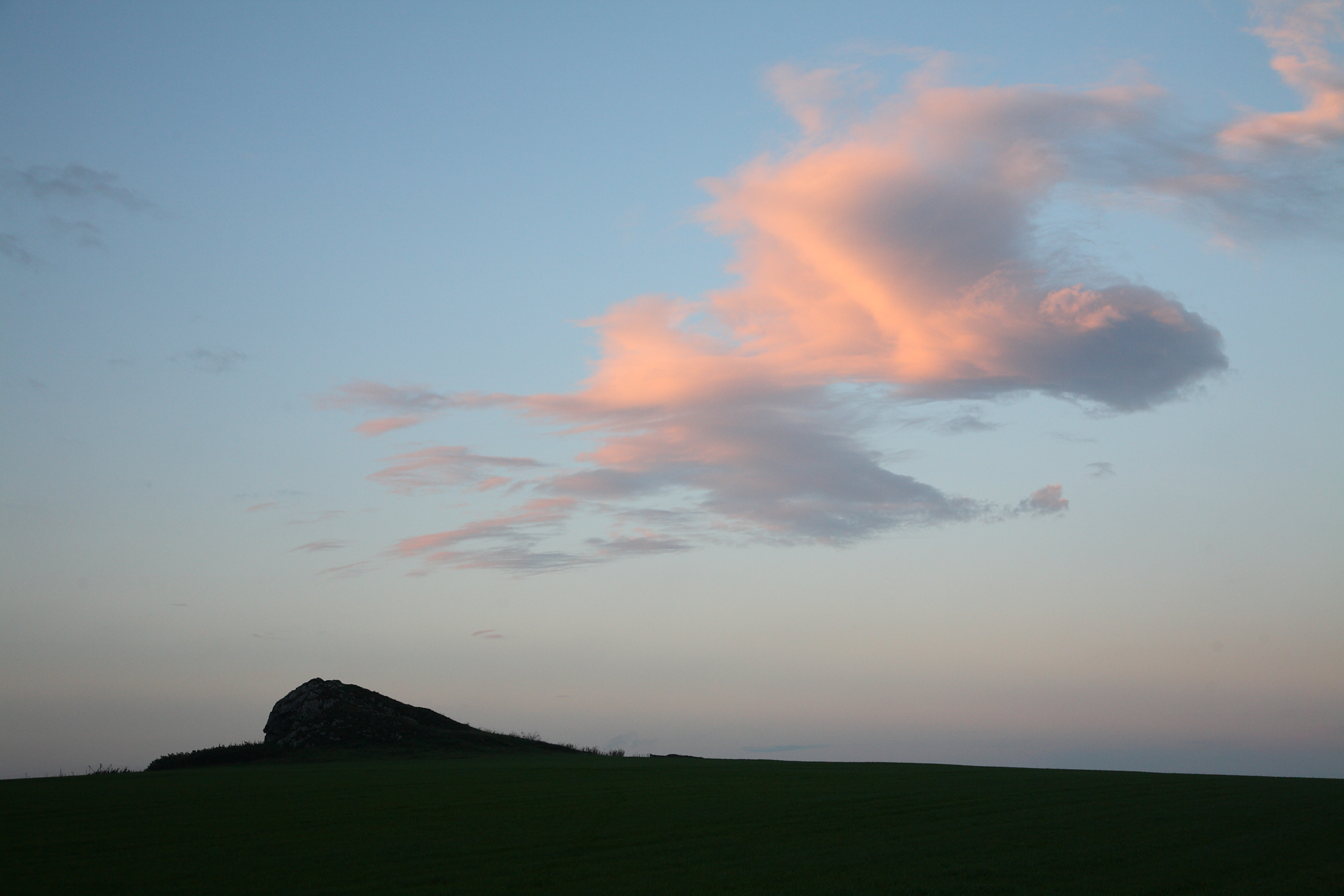
Unnamed high point (51°25′4.9″N 8°41′13.3″E; 545.1 m) in Am Battenberg Nature Reserve

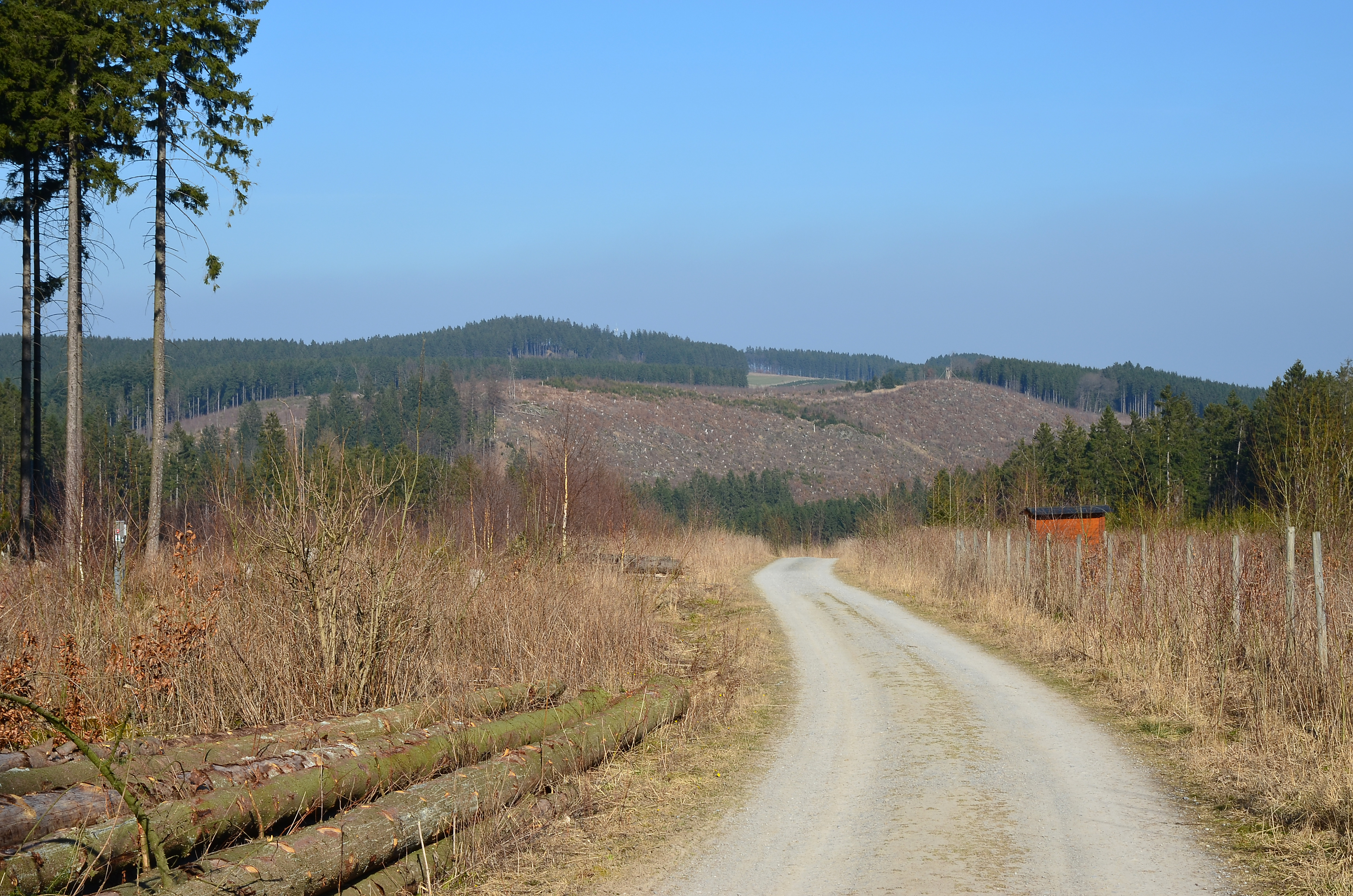
Brilon Plateau: path north of the Borberg (2014), 7 years after Kyrill

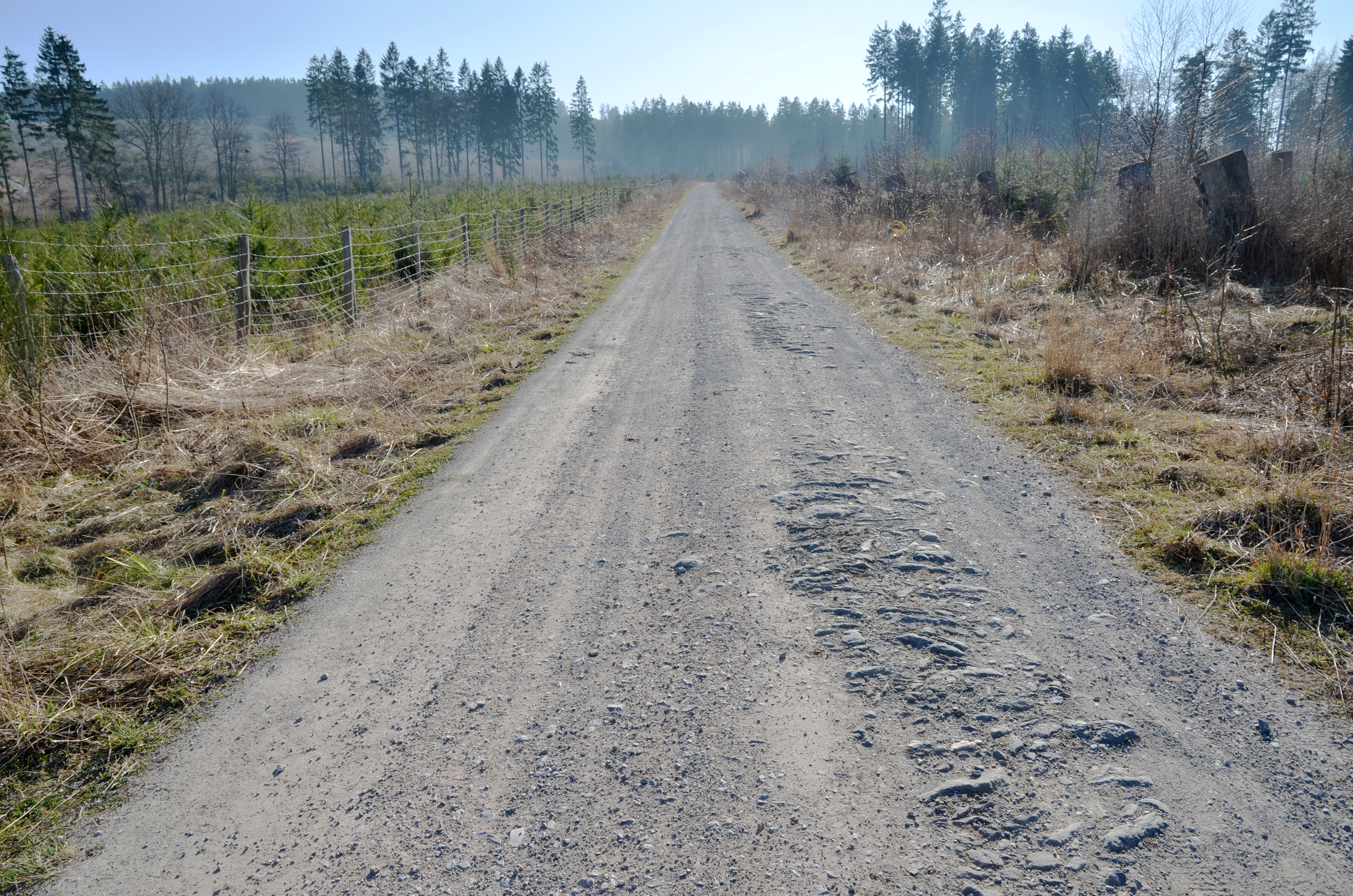
Brilon Plateau: path between the Borberg and the Hiebammen Hut (2014), 7 years after Kyrill

The Brilon Plateau (German: Briloner Hochfläche) is a highland area in the county of Hochsauerlandkreis in the German state of North Rhine-Westphalia. It is surrounded by the Brilon Heights (Briloner Höhen), whose mountains reach a height of 670.2 m above sea level (NHN).

== Geography ==
=== Location ===
The countryside of the Brilon Plateau and Brilon Heights includes the town of Brilon itself and several of its municipalities. Administratively it belongs largely to Hochsauerlandkreis, in the northeast, near Bleiwäsche, it is part of the county of Paderborn. It is roughly elliptical in shape; its longitudinal axis running from east-northeast to west-southwest.

To the north and northeast it transitions via the Alme Uplands into the Sintfeld. In the east and southeast it descends into the very deeply incised valley of the Hoppecke. In the south it is adjoined by the Sauerland and Upland (landscapes in the Rothaar Mountains); in the west by the Warstein Forest (the eastern part of the Arnsberg Forest Nature Park) and in the northwest by the narrow Haarstrang. In the north the terrain descends (on the far side of Sintfeld and Haarstrang) more or less gently into the Westphalian Bight towards the River Lippe. The plateau forms an island of farmland in the middle of forested mountains and hills.

=== Mountains and hills ===
The mountains and hills of the Brilon Heights include the following (sorted by height in metres (m) above sea level (NHN):

- Borberg (670.2 m) – southwest of Brilon
- Bilstein (620.1 m) – northwest of Hoppecke
- Eisenberg (606.2 m) – südwest of Brilon
- Poppenberg (605.0 m) – south of Brilon
- Weiße Frau (562.5 m) – east of Rösenbeck
- Heimberg (536.4 m) – east of Brilon
- Totenkopf (502.6 m) – west of Marsberg
- Schaaken (500 m) – east-northeast of Brilon
- Schälhorn (499.1 m) – east of Scharfenberg
- Bulstern (482.3 m) – west of Wülfte
- Schweinskopf (481.4 m) – east-southeast of Bleiwäsche
- Schellberg (472 m)

== Literature ==
- Gerd Petermeyer (1982), Zur Morphogenese der Brilon Plateau und des Sintfeldes (Dissertation) (in German), Düsseldorf
- Wolfgang Feige (1970), Die Briloner Hochfläche: Landschaftsführer des Westfälischen Heimatbundes 07 [The Brilon plateau: landscape guide of the Westfälische Heimatbund 07] (in German), Münster: Aschendorff Verlag, ISBN 3-402-06343-3
