= Bremecke =

Bremecke may refer to following rivers of North Rhine-Westphalia, Germany:

- Bremecke (Hoppecke), tributary of the Hoppecke
- Bremecke (Möhne), tributary of the Möhne
