= Borchen =

- Municipality
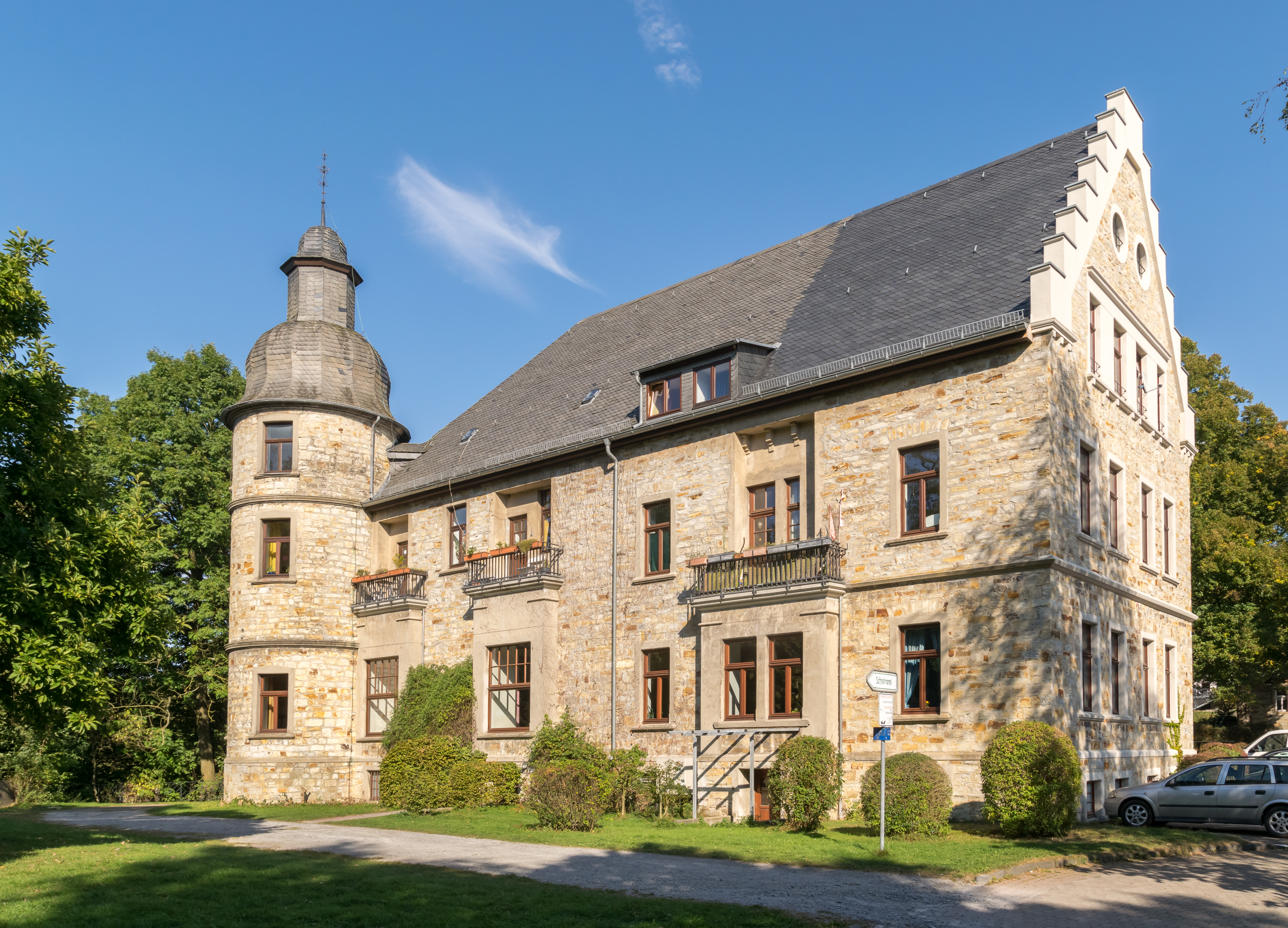
- Schloss Hamborn in Borchen

- Flag Coat of arms

- Location of Borchen within Paderborn district
- Interactive map of Borchen
- Location within Germany Location within North Rhine-Westphalia
- Coordinates: 51°40′00″N 08°44′00″E
- Country: Germany
- State: North Rhine-Westphalia
- Admin. region: Detmold
- District: Paderborn
- Founded: 1969
- Subdivisions: 5

Government
  - Mayor (2020–25): Uwe Gockel (Ind.)

Area
  - Total: 77.28 km^{2} (29.84 sq mi)
- Elevation: 150 m (490 ft)

Population (2025-12-31)
  - Total: 13,682
  - Density: 177.0/km^{2} (458.5/sq mi)
- Time zone: UTC+01:00 (CET)
  - Summer (DST): UTC+02:00 (CEST)
- Postal codes: 33176–33178
- Dialling codes: 05251, 05292, 05293
- Vehicle registration: PB
- Website: www.borchen.de

Borchen (German pronunciation: [ˈbɔʁçn̩]) is a municipality in the district of Paderborn, in North Rhine-Westphalia, Germany.

== Geography ==
=== Location ===
Borchen is situated in the Paderborn tableland, approximately 5 km south of Paderborn. The municipality also contains a small part of the eastern Hellweg area. At the north-western border of Borchen the Altenau flows into the Alme River.

=== Neighbouring municipalities ===
Starting in the north, rotating clockwise, Paderborn, Lichtenau, Bad Wünnenberg and Salzkotten are neighbouring municipalities of Borchen.

=== Division of the municipality ===
According to § 4 of Borchen's ordinance the municipality is divided into the following urban areas:

- Alfen
- Dörenhagen (including Eggeringhausen and Busch)
- Etteln
- Kirchborchen (including Schloß Hamborn)
- Nordborchen

== History ==
Borchen in its current form has only existed since 1969. Its predecessors were governed by the Archdiocese of Paderborn.

In the 14th century the Bishopric of Paderborn was formed, which in turn became part of the Lower Rhenish-Westphalian Circle from the 16th century onward. From 1802 until 1807 the Bishopric was occupied by the Kingdom of Prussia, whereafter it fell to the Kingdom of Westphalia. In 1813 this kingdom fell apart, and in 1815 the Prussian Kingdom reoccupied the area. In this period Prussia instituted new administrative divisions which, in a modified form, can still be found today.

Thus the area became a member of the newly founded administrative district of Minden in the Province of Westphalia. In 1816, in the process of forming the new Districts of Germany, Alfen, Nordborchen, Kirchborchen and Dörenhagen were integrated into the district of Paderborn, whereas Etteln became a member of the district of Büren.

In 1969, the municipalities Alfen, Nordborchen and Kirchborchen merged, forming the municipality of Borchen. Finally, on January 1, 1975, Etteln and Dörenhangen joined Borchen.

== Population ==
Historical population

| Year | Pop. | ±% p.a. |
|---|---|---|
| 1965 | 7,264 | — |
| 1970 | 8,083 | +2.16% |
| 1975 | 8,930 | +2.01% |
| 1980 | 10,013 | +2.32% |
| 1985 | 10,261 | +0.49% |
| 1990 | 11,071 | +1.53% |
| 1995 | 12,338 | +2.19% |

| Year | Pop. | ±% p.a. |
|---|---|---|
| 2000 | 12,976 | +1.01% |
| 2005 | 13,405 | +0.65% |
| 2010 | 13,488 | +0.12% |
| 2015 | 13,447 | −0.06% |
| 2020 | 13,475 | +0.04% |
| 2025 | 13,682 | +0.31% |

Source: Landesdatabank Nordrhein-Westfalen

== Twin towns ==
- Schwarzenberg, Saxony (since 2007)
