= Schmala =

River in Germany

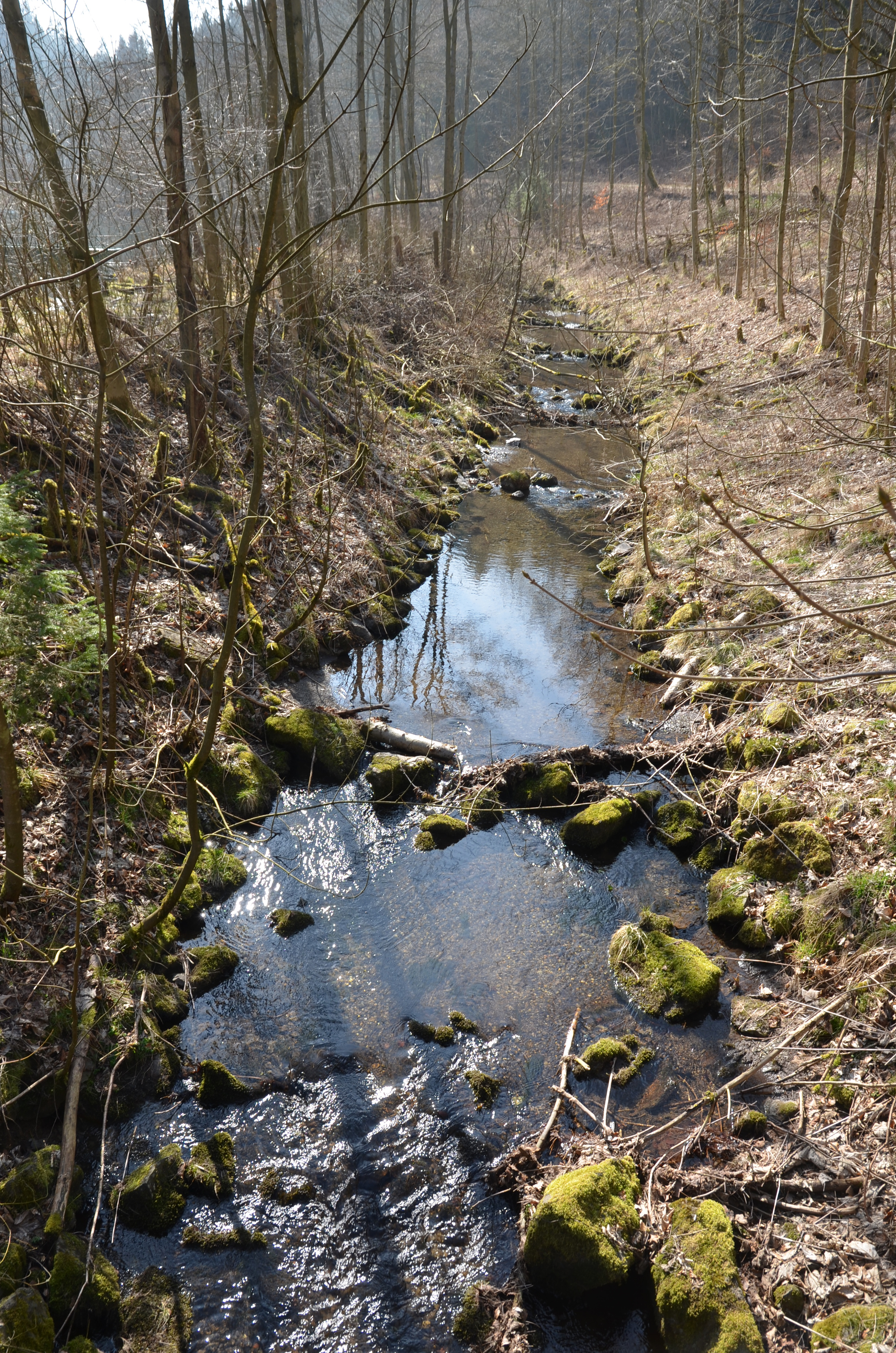

Location
- Country: Germany
- States: North Rhine-Westphalia

Physical characteristics
- Mouth
  - location: Hoppecke
  - coordinates: 51.3340°N 8.5816°E

Basin features
- Progression: Hoppecke→ Diemel→ Weser→ North Sea

Schmala (also: Schellhornbach) is a small river of North Rhine-Westphalia, Germany. It is 6.7 km (4.2 mi) long and flows as a left tributary into the Hoppecke near Brilon.

== See also ==
- List of rivers of North Rhine-Westphalia
