= Etteln =

Coordinates: 51°37′40″N 8°45′45″E

Etteln is a village in the municipality of Borchen, district of Paderborn in the German State of North Rhine-Westphalia. Etteln is situated near Atteln at the river Altenau.

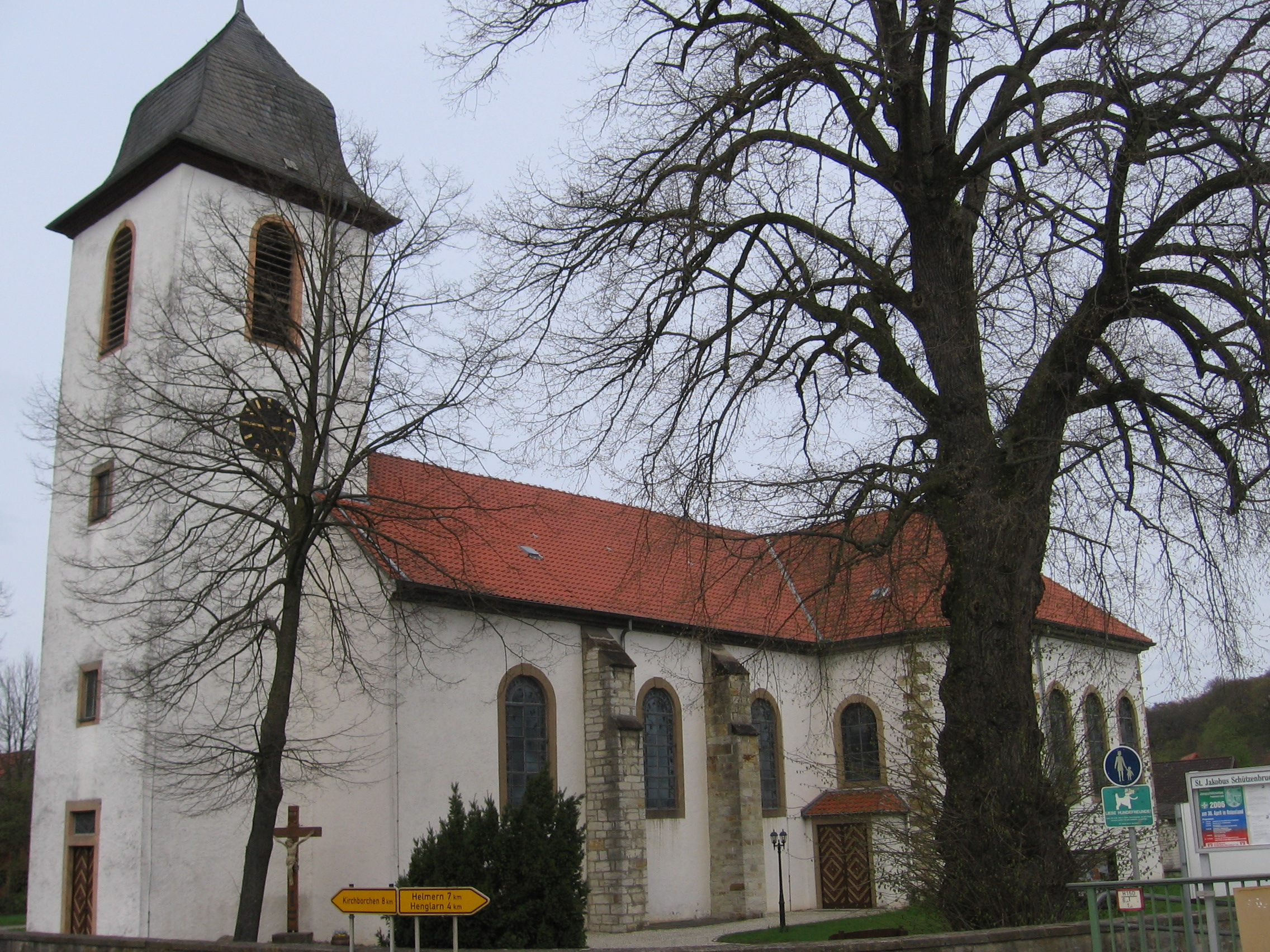
Church St. Simon und Judas Thaddäus.

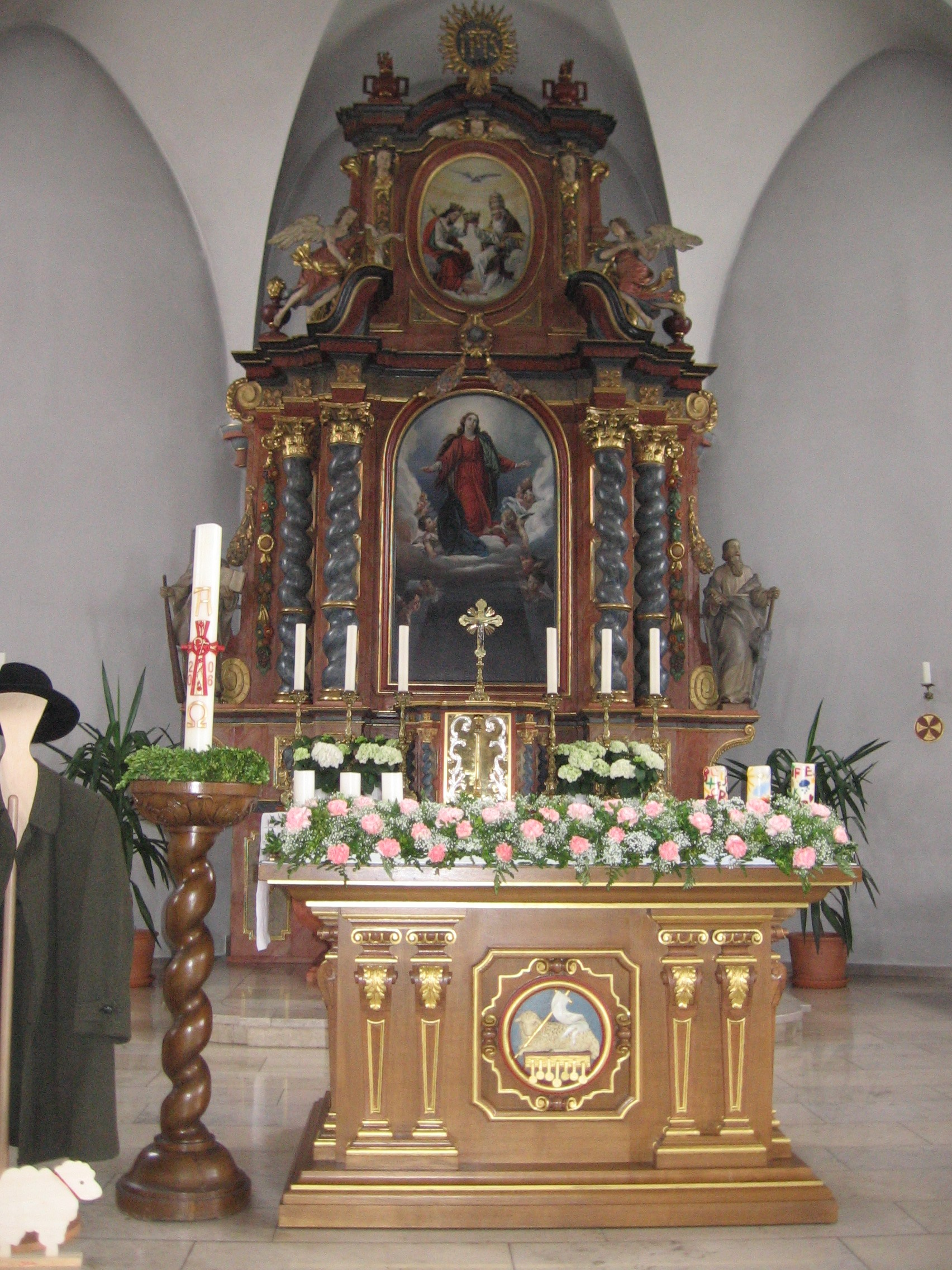
Church

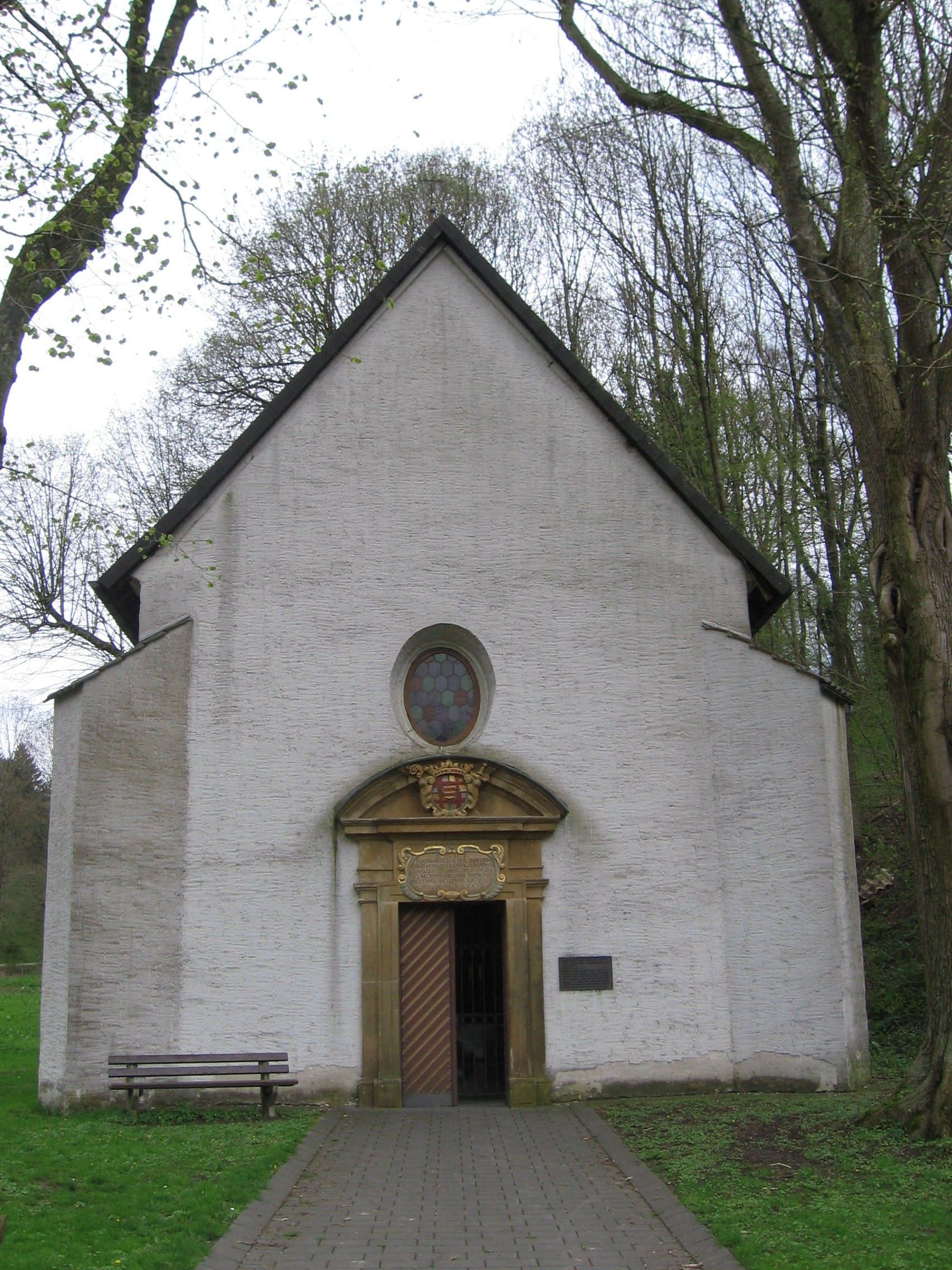
Chapel

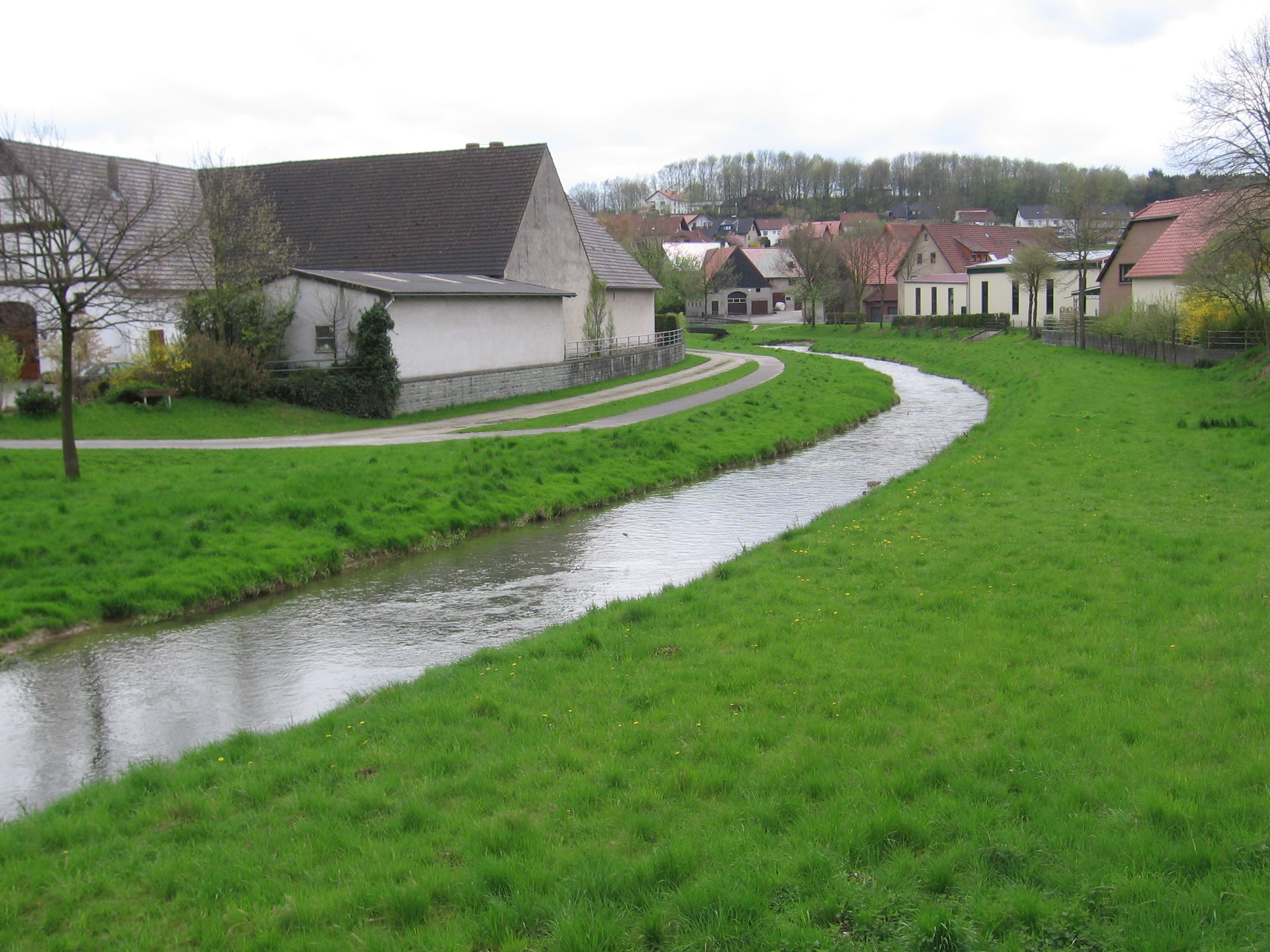
The river Altenau Enten

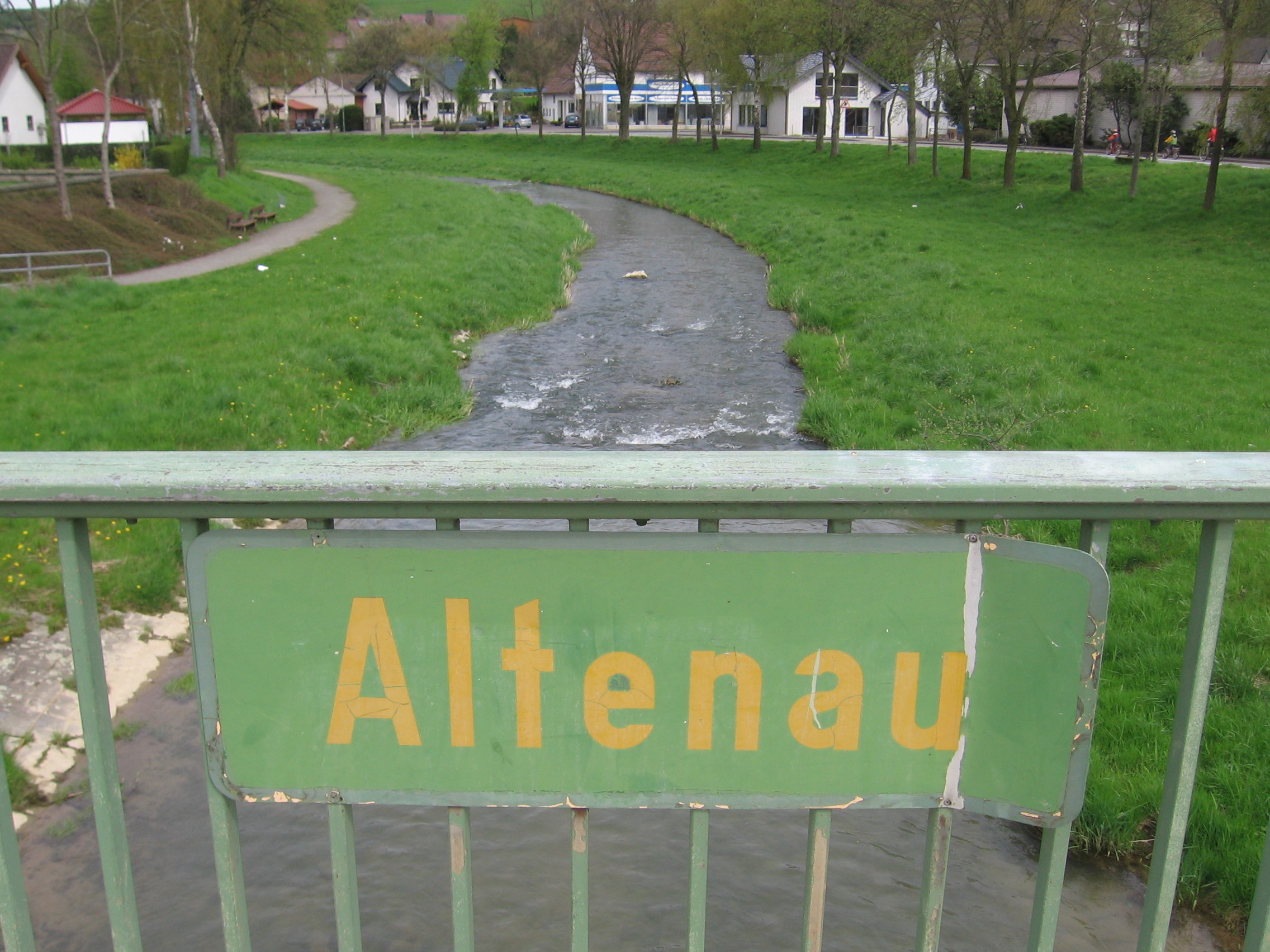
