= Nette (Alme) =

River in Germany

Location
- Country: Germany
- State: North Rhine-Westphalia

Physical characteristics
- Mouth
  - location: Alme
  - coordinates: 51.4832°N 8.6086°E
- Length: 10.3 km (6.4 mi)

Basin features
- Progression: Alme→ Lippe→ Rhine→ North Sea

The Nette (German pronunciation: [ˈnɛtə]) is a 10,36 km long river of North Rhine-Westphalia, Germany. It is a right tributary of the river Alme near Harth. During its course it experiences an elevation change of 141 m.

== See also ==
- List of rivers of North Rhine-Westphalia
