= Aabach =

Aabach may refer to:

== Germany ==
- Aabach (Afte), a tributary of the Afte, North Rhine-Westphalia
- Aabach (Hessel), a small river in the Ems river system, North Rhine-Westphalia
- Kleine Aa (Aabach) (also the little Aabach), a tributary of the Aabach (Afte), North Rhine-Westphalia

== Switzerland ==
- Aabach (Aare) (AG), a creek, which flows into the Aare
- Aabach (Greifensee), or Usterner Aa, a river in canton of Zurich
- Aabach (Seetal), a river in the cantons of Lucerne and Aargau, runs through Lake Hallwyl and flows into the Aare
- Aabach (Obersee), a tributary of the Obersee

== See also ==
- AA (disambiguation)
