= Atteln =

- Stadtteil of Lichtenau
- Location of Atteln within Lichtenau
- Interactive map of Atteln
- Location within Germany Location within North Rhine-Westphalia
- Coordinates: 51°36′00″N 08°48′00″E
- Country: Germany
- State: North Rhine-Westphalia
- District: Paderborn
- Town: Lichtenau

Area
  - Total: 15.44 km^{2} (5.96 sq mi)
- Elevation: 196 m (643 ft)

Population (2020-12-31)
  - Total: 1,482
  - Density: 95.98/km^{2} (248.6/sq mi)
- Time zone: UTC+01:00 (CET)
  - Summer (DST): UTC+02:00 (CEST)
- Postal codes: 33165
- Dialling codes: 05292

Atteln is a village in the district of Paderborn, in North Rhine-Westphalia, Germany. Formerly an independent municipality, it is part of the town Lichtenau since 1975.

== Geography ==
=== Location ===
Atteln is situated in the Paderborn tableland, approximately 20 km south of Paderborn. Atteln is the central town in the Altenau valley.

=== Neighbouring settlements ===
Starting in the north, rotating clockwise, Etteln, Dörenhagen, Ebbinghausen, Husen, Dalheim, Elisenhof, Helmern and Henglarn are neighbouring villages of Atteln.

== History ==
Germanic tribes were living in the area of Atteln already 5000 years ago, and their traces can still be seen today. Seven cist graves, two of them in Atteln, have been discovered in the Altenau valley. The largest cist grave has been excavated in Atteln in 1978. Atteln is the oldest rural parish in the diocese of Paderborn. A priest Meinhard of Atteln in mentioned in 897. The town probably got its name from the family (of) Atteln, a noble family that arrived in the Altenau valley in 804. One Anselm of Atteln is recorded in a 13th-century document. Atteln gained importance during medieval times, when a court was established in the village. Atteln's baroque style parish church St Achatius was built in 1712.
