= Aabech =

Disambiguation page

Aabech is a Danish surname. Notable people with the surname include:

- Hans Aabech (1948–2018), Danish footballer
- Kim Aabech (born 1983), Danish footballer, son of Hans

== See also ==
- Aabach (disambiguation)
