= Büren, Westphalia =

Büren
- Town
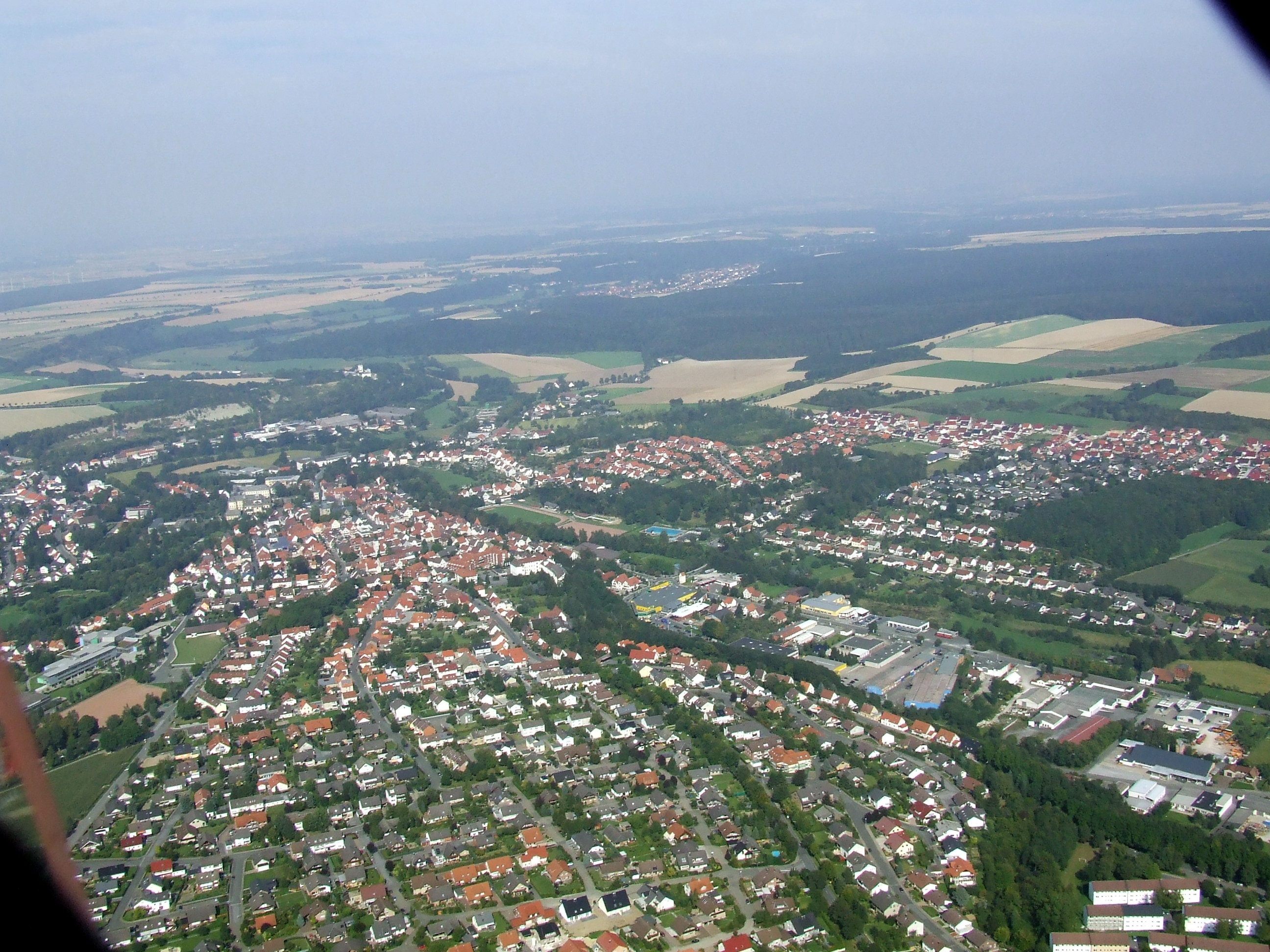
- Aerial view from the south of Büren

- Coat of arms

- Location of Büren in the district of Paderborn
- Interactive map of Büren
- Location within Germany Location within North Rhine-Westphalia
- Coordinates: 51°33′N 8°34′E
- Country: Germany
- State: North Rhine-Westphalia
- Admin. region: Detmold
- District: Paderborn
- Subdivisions: 12

Government
  - Mayor (2020–25): Burkhard Schwuchow (CDU)

Area
  - Total: 170.99 km^{2} (66.02 sq mi)
- Elevation: 190–360 m (620–1,180 ft)

Population (2025-12-31)
  - Total: 20,930
  - Density: 122.4/km^{2} (317.0/sq mi)
- Time zone: UTC+01:00 (CET)
  - Summer (DST): UTC+02:00 (CEST)
- Postal codes: 33142
- Dialling codes: 2951; 2955 (Wewelsburg); 2958 (Harth)
- Vehicle registration: PB, BÜR
- Website: www.bueren.de

Büren (German pronunciation: [ˈbyːʁən]) is a town in the district of Paderborn, in North Rhine-Westphalia, Germany.

== Geography ==
Büren is situated at the confluence of the rivers Alme and Afte, approx. 20 km south-west of Paderborn and approx. 30 km south-east of Lippstadt.

=== Neighbouring municipalities ===
- Brilon
- Geseke
- Rüthen
- Salzkotten
- Bad Wünnenberg

=== Division of the town ===
After the local government reforms of 1975 Büren consists of the following districts:

- Büren
- Ahden
- Barkhausen
- Brenken
- Eickhoff
- Harth
- Hegensdorf
- Keddinghausen
- Ringelstein
- Siddinghausen
- Steinhausen
- Weiberg
- Weine
- Wewelsburg

=== Transportation ===
Büren was connected with Paderborn and Brilon by the Alme Valley Railway, but passenger services were ended in 1981.

== Population ==
Historical population

Year	Pop.	±% p.a.
1965	16,538	—
1970	17,163	+0.74%
1975	17,353	+0.22%
1980	17,534	+0.21%
1985	17,923	+0.44%
1990	18,748	+0.90%
1995	21,619	+2.89%

Year	Pop.	±% p.a.
2000	22,108	+0.45%
2005	22,152	+0.04%
2010	21,500	−0.60%
2015	21,772	+0.25%
2020	21,452	−0.30%
2025	20,930	−0.49%

Source: Landesdatabank Nordrhein-Westfalen

== Twin towns – sister cities ==
Büren is twinned with:

- Kortemark, Belgium (1981)
- Charenton-le-Pont, France (1989)
- Mittersill, Austria (1995)
- Ignalina, Lithuania (2003)

== Culture and notable places ==
The village of Wewelsburg is the home of the Wewelsburg Renaissance castle, which was a focus of SS mythology during the Nazism era. The castle now hosts the museum of the district of Paderborn with the permanent exhibition "Wewelsburg 1933–1945. Place of cult and terror of the SS".

== Notable people ==
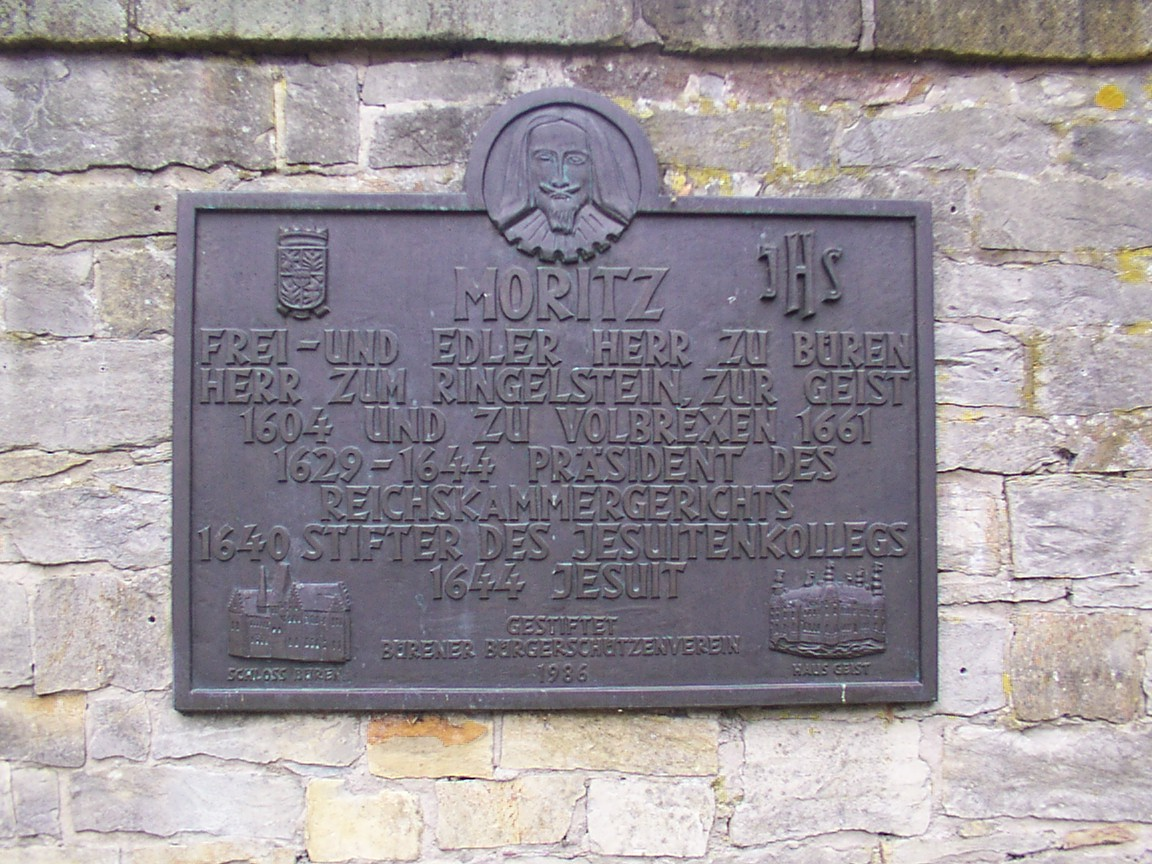
Memorial plate Moritz von Büren in Büren

- Adelaide II of Büren (died 1220), abbess
- Moritz von Büren (1604–1661), founder of the Jesuit college
- Daniel Farke (born 1976), football player and manager
- Michael Henke (born 1957), football player and manager
