= Lichtenau, Westphalia =

Lichtenau
- Town
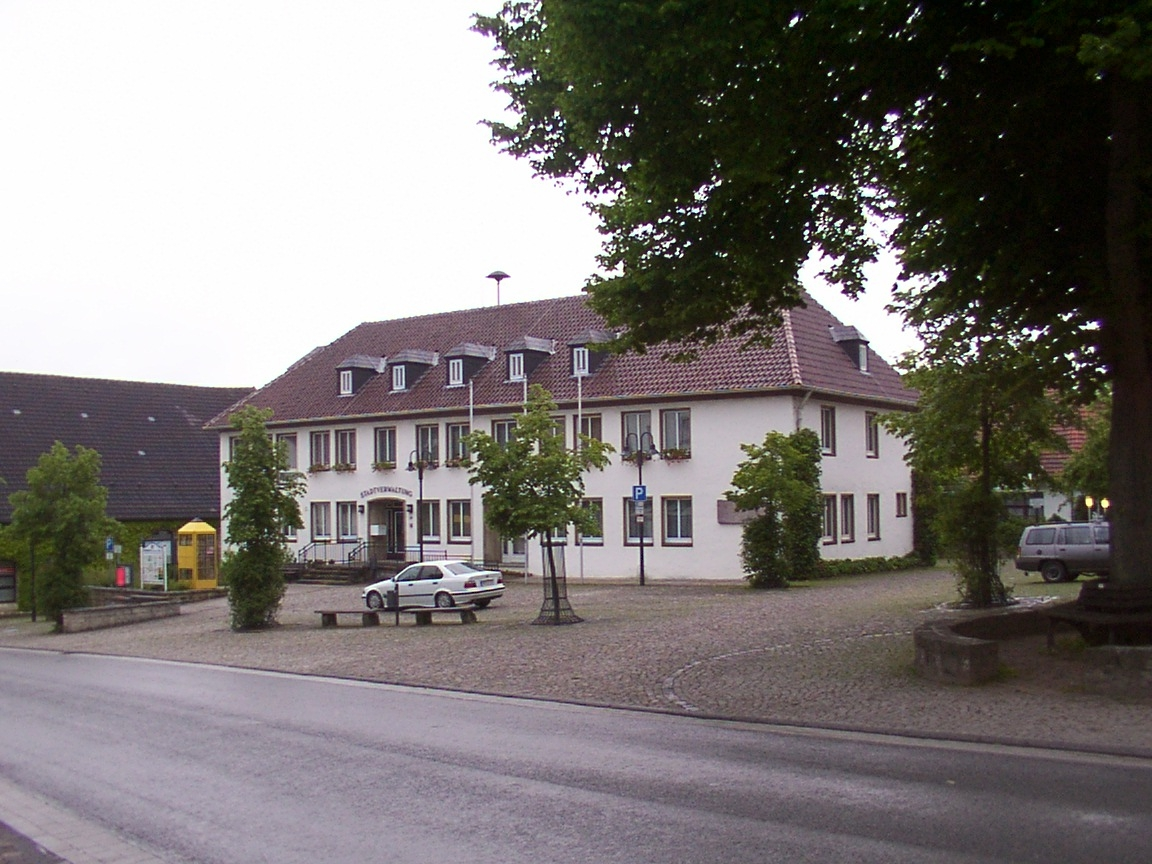
- Town hall in Lichtenau

- Coat of arms

- Location of Lichtenau within Paderborn district
- Interactive map of Lichtenau
- Location within Germany Location within North Rhine-Westphalia
- Coordinates: 51°36′00″N 08°53′00″E
- Country: Germany
- State: North Rhine-Westphalia
- Admin. region: Detmold
- District: Paderborn
- Subdivisions: 15

Government
  - Mayor (2020–25): Ute Maria Dülfer (SPD)

Area
  - Total: 192.57 km^{2} (74.35 sq mi)
- Elevation: 179–407 m (587–1,335 ft)

Population (2025-12-31)
  - Total: 11,010
  - Density: 57.17/km^{2} (148.1/sq mi)
- Time zone: UTC+01:00 (CET)
  - Summer (DST): UTC+02:00 (CEST)
- Postal codes: 33162–33165
- Dialling codes: 05295; 05292 Atteln; 05647 Kleinenberg; 05259 Herbram-Wald; 02994 Blankenrode
- Vehicle registration: PB
- Website: www.lichtenau.de

Lichtenau (German pronunciation: [ˈlɪçtənaʊ]) is a municipality in the district of Paderborn, in North Rhine-Westphalia, Germany.

== Geography ==
Lichtenau is situated on the western slope of the Eggegebirge, approx. 15 km south-east of Paderborn.

=== Division of the town ===
After the local government reforms of 1975 Lichtenau consists of the following 15 districts:

- Lichtenau District
- Asseln
- Atteln
- Blankenrode
- Dalheim
- Ebbinghausen
- Grundsteinheim
- Hakenberg
- Henglarn
- Herbram
- Holtheim
- Husen
- Iggenhausen
- Kleinenberg

== Population ==
Historical population

Year	Pop.	±% p.a.
1965	8,073	—
1970	8,523	+1.09%
1975	8,408	−0.27%
1980	8,592	+0.43%
1985	9,131	+1.22%
1990	9,791	+1.41%
1995	10,461	+1.33%

Year	Pop.	±% p.a.
2000	11,009	+1.03%
2005	11,237	+0.41%
2010	10,925	−0.56%
2015	10,589	−0.62%
2020	10,551	−0.07%
2025	11,010	+0.86%

Source: Landesdatabank Nordrhein-Westfalen

== Twin Towns ==
Lichtenau is partnered with the following towns:

- Mayet (France—since September 29, 1985)
- Rangsdorf (Brandenburg, Germany—since February 27, 1993
- Pieniężno (Poland) -- since October 14, 1996
