= Bleiwäsche =

Village in North Rhine-Westphalia, Germany

Coordinates: 51°28′11″N 8°42′25″E

Bleiwäsche is the southernmost village in the Kreis Paderborn in North Rhine-Westphalia and belongs to the town of Bad Wünnenberg. At the same time, with an elevation of 447 m above NHN, it is the highest village in the Regierungsbezirk Detmold.
