= Ostwestfalen-Lippe =

Region in Germany

Coordinates: 51°56′N 8°53′E

Ostwestfalen-Lippe marked in red within Germany

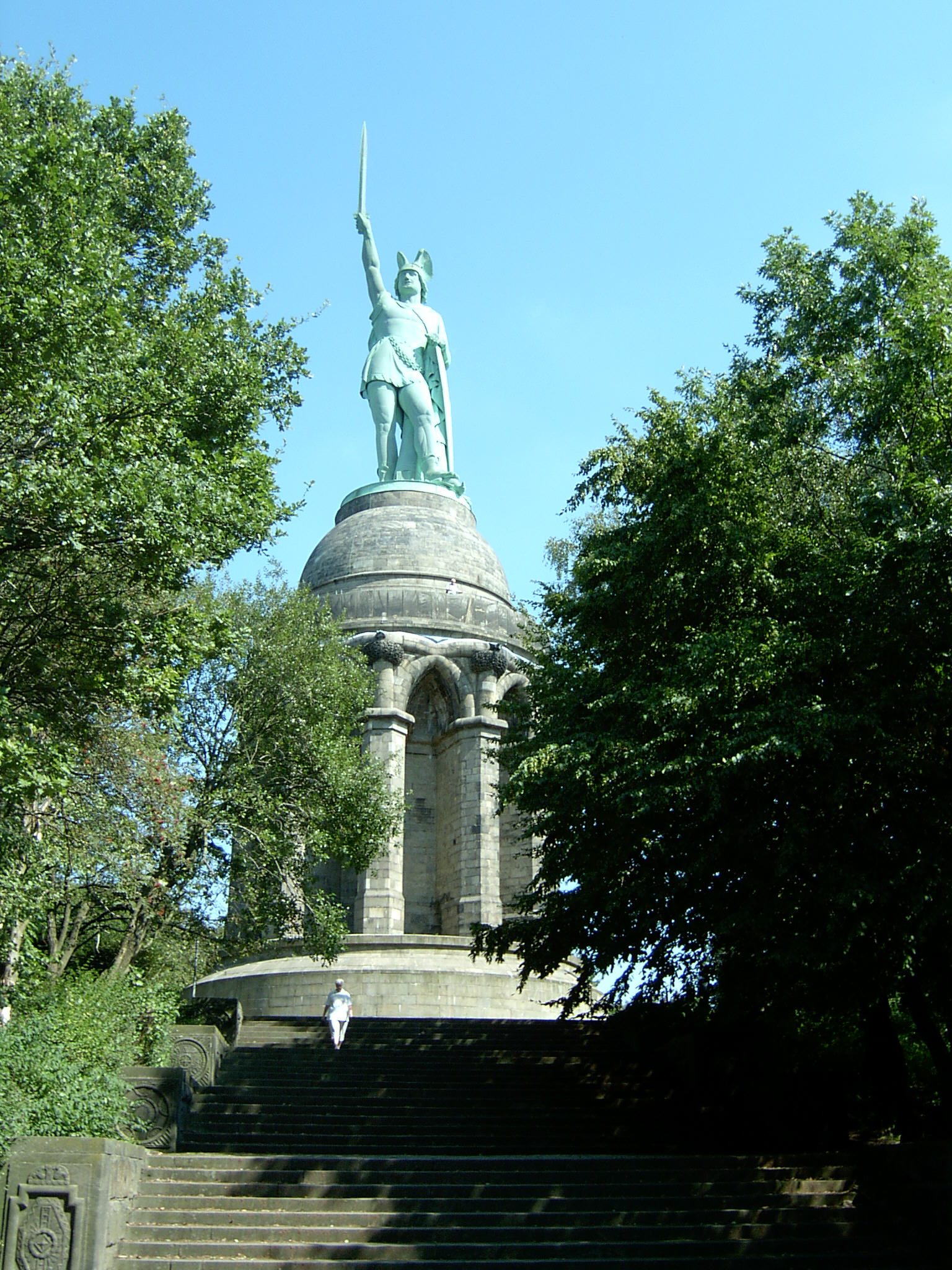
The Hermannsdenkmal near Detmold

Ostwestfalen-Lippe ([ˌɔstvɛstfaːlənˈlɪpə], literally East(ern) Westphalia-Lippe, abbreviation OWL) is the eastern region of the German state of North Rhine-Westphalia, congruent with the administrative region of Detmold and containing the eastern part of Westphalia, joined with the Lippe region. The region has a population of about two million inhabitants. The region includes the cities of Bielefeld, Paderborn and Gütersloh, and the major towns of Minden, Detmold and Herford. The highest hill of Ostwestfalen-Lippe is the Totenkopf (498 m).

The Teutoburg Forest and the Egge Hills stretch across the region and form the frontier to the Westphalian Lowland. Ostwestfalen-Lippe is one of the supposed regions of the Battle of the Teutoburg Forest in the year 9 AD, where an alliance of Germanic tribes defeated a Roman army. In 1875, a statue was unveiled of the commander Arminius, who led the Germans to victory at the battle. This statue, the Hermannsdenkmal, is one of the best-known sights and landmarks in Ostwestfalen-Lippe.

Some major globally operating companies are headquartered in the region, for example Bertelsmann, Miele, Dr. Oetker, Melitta, Gerry Weber, DMG Mori Aktiengesellschaft, Hörmann, Schüco, Wincor Nixdorf, Phoenix Contact, HEGLA and Claas. In 2012 OWL became Germans BMBF Leading Edge Technology Cluster for intelligent Technical Systems (it's OWL), which is currently the largest public funded project in the context of the government initiative "Industry 4.0". Universities are located in Bielefeld, Paderborn and Lemgo. The Fraunhofer Society is engaged in OWL in Lemgo and Paderborn.
