= Hoher Eimberg =

Mountain in Germany

Highest point
- Elevation: 806.1 m (2,645 ft)
- Coordinates: 51°18′43″N 8°36′03″E

Geography
- Location: Landkreis Waldeck-Frankenberg, Hesse, Germany

Hoher Eimberg is a mountain of Landkreis Waldeck-Frankenberg, Hesse, Germany.
