= Bremecke (Hoppecke) =

River in North Rhine-Westphalia, Germany

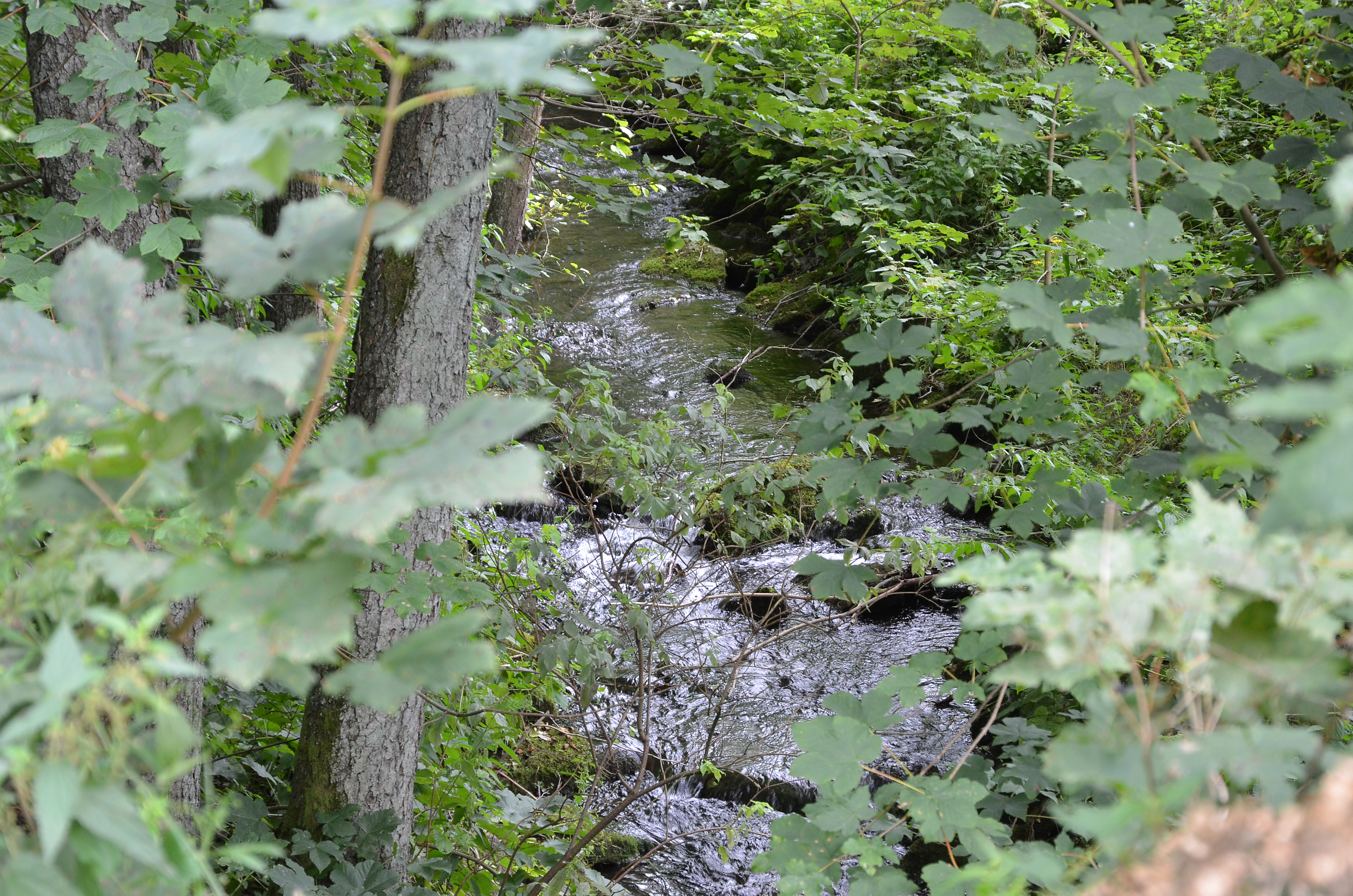

Location
- Country: Germany
- State: North Rhine-Westphalia

Physical characteristics
- Mouth
  - location: Hoppecke
  - coordinates: 51.3720°N 8.6238°E

Basin features
- Progression: Hoppecke→ Diemel→ Weser→ North Sea

Bremecke is a river of North Rhine-Westphalia, Germany. It is a right tributary of the Hoppecke.

== See also ==
- List of rivers of North Rhine-Westphalia
