= Husen =

Husen is a given name and a surname. Notable people with the name include:

== Given name ==
- Husen Wangsaatmadja (1926–1988), Indonesian military officer and politician

== Surname ==
- Katja Husen (1976–2022), German biologist and politician
- Mohamed Husen (born Mahjub bin Adam Mohamed; 1904–1944), Afro-German soldier
- Najir Husen, known as Najir Husen, (born 1990), Nepalese film actor
- Torsten Husén (1916–2009), Swedish educator and scholar
