= Bremecke (Möhne) =

River in Germany

Location
- Country: Germany
- State: North Rhine-Westphalia

Physical characteristics
- Mouth
  - location: Möhne
  - coordinates: 51°28′34″N 8°10′38″E

Basin features
- Progression: Möhne→ Ruhr→ Rhine→ North Sea

Bremecke is a river of North Rhine-Westphalia, Germany. It is 2.4 km long and a left tributary of the Möhne.

== See also ==
- List of rivers of North Rhine-Westphalia
