= Afte =

River in North Rhine-Westphalia, Germany

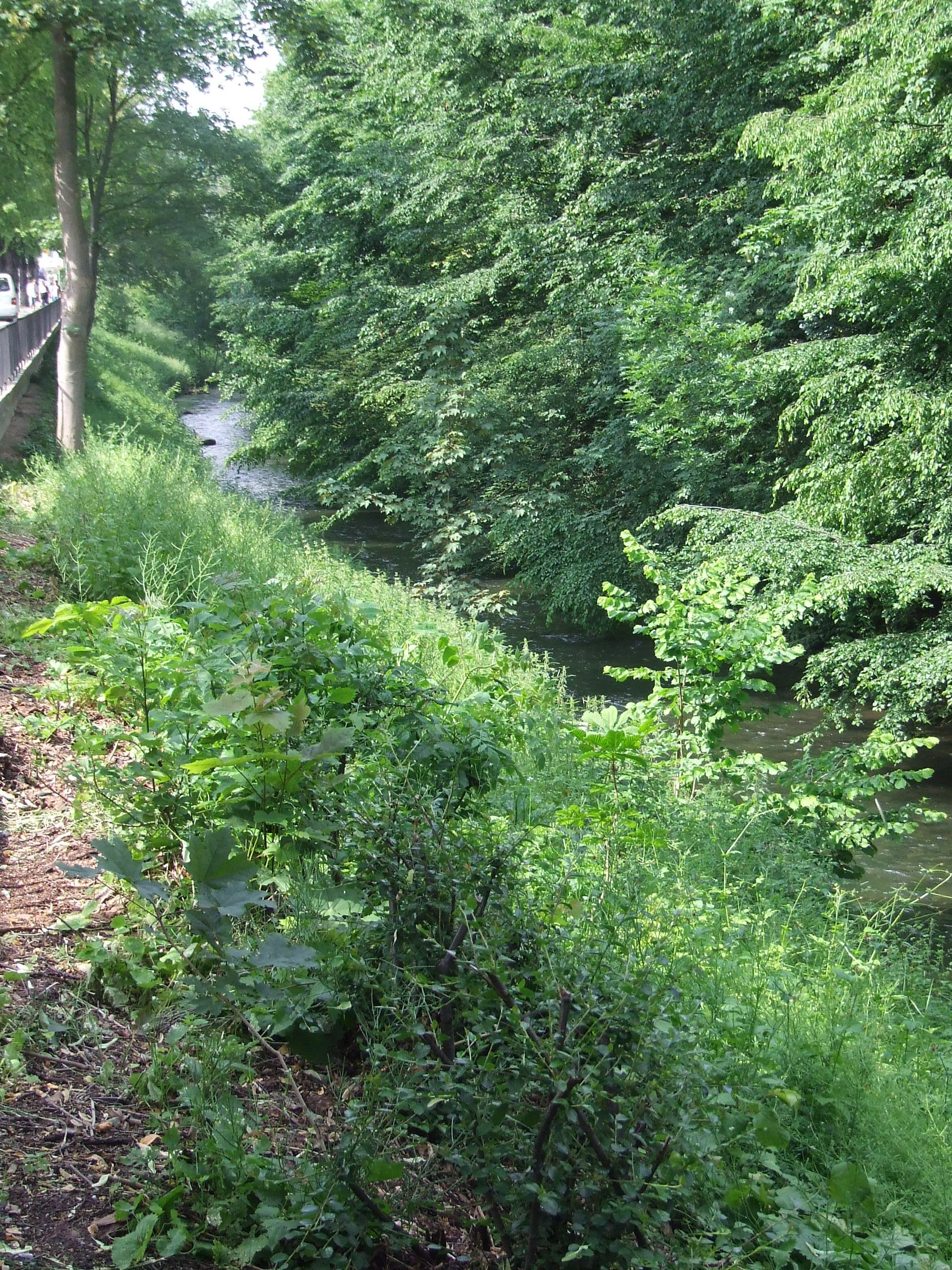

Location
- Country: Germany
- Location: North Rhine-Westphalia

Physical characteristics
- Mouth
  - location: Alme
  - coordinates: 51.5577°N 8.5577°E
- Length: 24.4 km (15.2 mi)
- Basin size: 172 km^{2} (66 sq mi)

Basin features
- Progression: Alme→ Lippe→ Rhine→ North Sea

Afte (German pronunciation: [ˈaftə]) is a river of North Rhine-Westphalia, Germany. It is a tributary of the river Alme, into which it flows in Büren.

== See also ==
- List of rivers of North Rhine-Westphalia
