= Brilon =

- Town
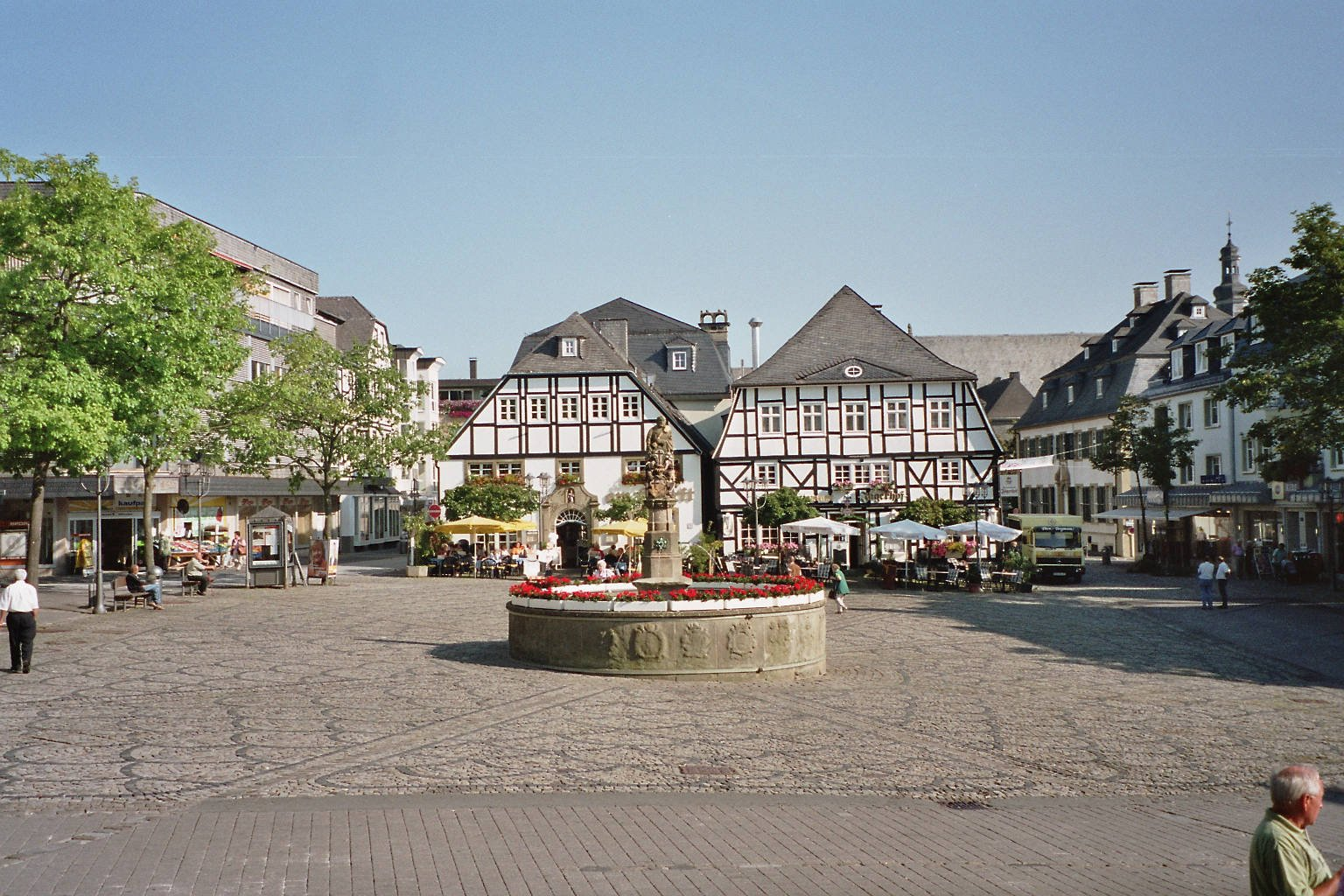
- Marketplace in Brilon

- Coat of arms

- Location of Brilon within Hochsauerlandkreis district
- Interactive map of Brilon
- Location within Germany Location within North Rhine-Westphalia
- Coordinates: 51°23′44″N 08°34′4″E
- Country: Germany
- State: North Rhine-Westphalia
- Admin. region: Arnsberg
- District: Hochsauerlandkreis
- Subdivisions: 17

Government
  - Mayor (2020–25): Christoph Bartsch (SPD)

Area
  - Total: 229.16 km^{2} (88.48 sq mi)
- Elevation: 450 m (1,480 ft)

Population (2025-12-31)
  - Total: 25,236
  - Density: 110.12/km^{2} (285.22/sq mi)
- Time zone: UTC+01:00 (CET)
  - Summer (DST): UTC+02:00 (CEST)
- Postal codes: 59914-59929
- Dialling codes: 02961 (Brilon) 02963 (Messinghausen) 02964 (Alme) 02991 (Marsberg-Bredelar)
- Vehicle registration: HSK
- Website: www.brilon.de

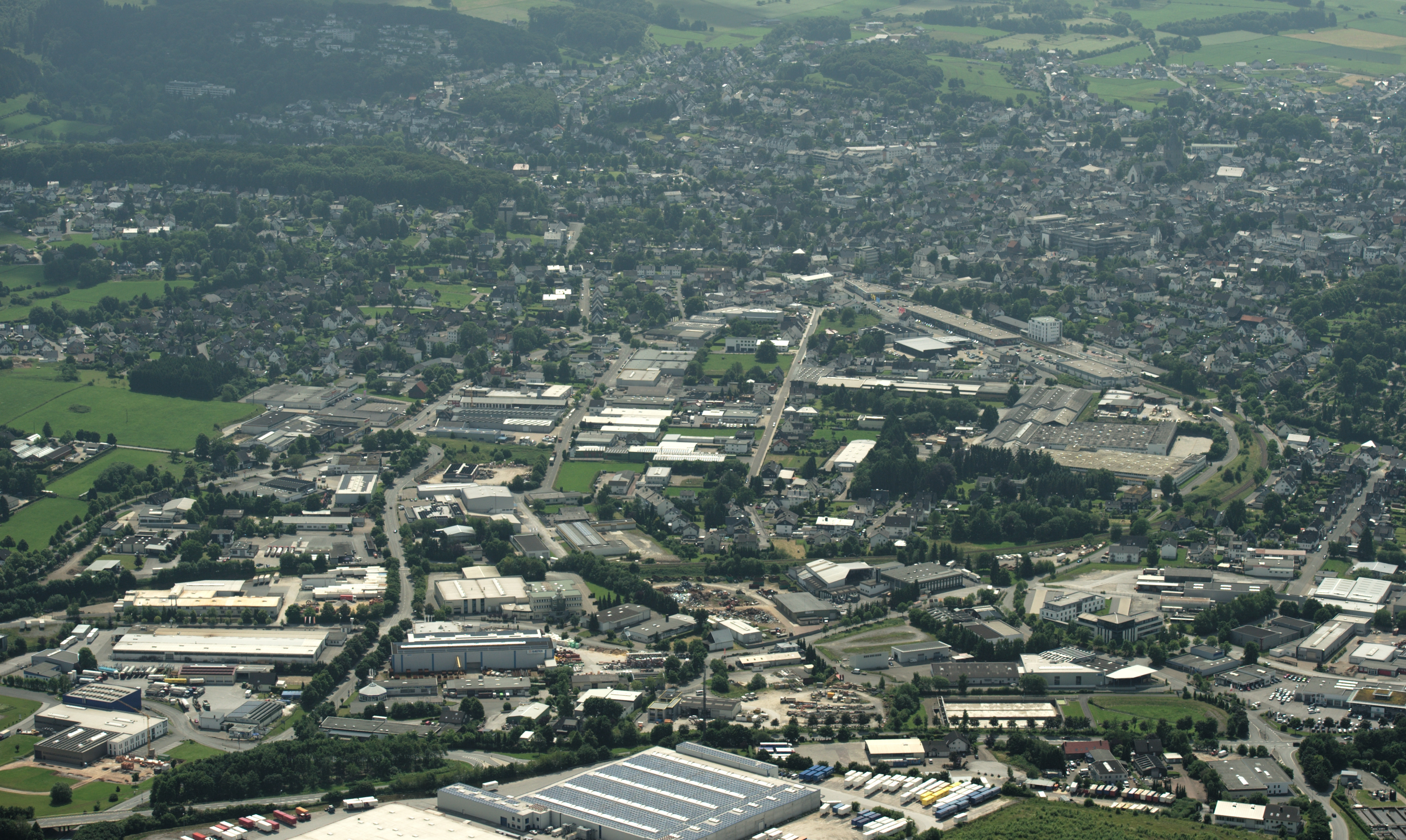
Brilon

Brilon (German pronunciation: [ˈbʁiːlɔn]; Westphalian: Brailen) is a town in North Rhine-Westphalia, Germany, which belongs to the Hochsauerlandkreis.

== Geography ==
Brilon is on the Brilon Heights, at an altitude of about 450m, and the upper reaches of the river Möhne. The town lies between the Arnsberg Forest nature reserve to the west and the Lake Diemel nature reserve and the Hoppecke to the south-east.

=== Neighboring municipalities ===
- Bad Wünnenberg
- Büren
- Diemelsee
- Marsberg
- Olsberg
- Rüthen
- Willingen

=== Division of the town ===
After the local government reforms of 1975 Brilon consists of 17 districts:

- Alme (1.273 inhabitants)
- Altenbüren (1.453 inhabitants)
- Bontkirchen (553 inhabitants)
- Brilon Town (14.513 inhabitants)
- Brilon-Wald (595 inhabitants)
- Esshoff (80 inhabitants)
- Gudenhagen/Petersborn (1.273 inhabitants)
- Hoppecke (1.330 inhabitants)
- Madfeld (1.395 inhabitants)
- Messinghausen (898 inhabitants)
- Nehden (503 inhabitants)
- Radlinghausen (129 inhabitants)
- Rixen (143 inhabitants)
- Rösenbeck (858 inhabitants)
- Scharfenberg (1.533 inhabitants)
- Thülen (1.088 inhabitants)
- Wülfte (421 inhabitants)

(Source of population figures: www.briloner-wirtschaft.de / As at: 31 December 2004)

== History ==
The first documentary reference occurs in a deed of the Emperor Otto II dated 973, confirming to the Cathedral of Magdeburg all those possessions in Westphalia given to it by his father, including the Villa Brilon. This reference must of course apply to a considerably older settlement than the present town, presumably what is now Altenbrilon. The Brilon estate passed later by exchange to the Archbishops of Paderborn, who endowed their steward ("Vogt") with it.

In about 1220 Engelbert I of Cologne, Archbishop of Cologne, acquired the Brilon lands of the brothers Hermann and Gernand of Brilon. The Archbishop laid out a fortified town and gave it municipal rights. Bloody conflicts followed between the Archbishops of Cologne and the Bishops of Paderborn over the rights of possession of the place. These ended when the Bishop of Paderborn, after being taken prisoner, waived his rights to Brilon (1256).

Thereafter Brilon developed under the rulership of the Prince-Bishops of Cologne into a thriving town of c 3,000 inhabitants with an active trading and mining life and far-reaching business connections. As a trading town Brilon was also a member of the Hansa. In 1350 Brilon had between 500 and 600 houses. At this time Brilon held the position of the second city of Westphalia behind Soest. After the secession of Soest in 1444 Brilon was elevated to being the capital of Westphalia.

In 1655, after three years of negotiations between the town magistrate and the Minorites resident in Brilon, the Gymnasium Petrinum was founded as a monastery school. It is thus one of the oldest Gymnasien ("grammar schools") in Westphalia.

But already in the 15th century conflicts and military actions were leading to an economic decline; and the wars of the 17th and 18th centuries brought unspeakable misery to this once flourishing little town.

During the Napoleonic period Brilon passed to Hesse-Darmstadt, in 1802. After the Congress of Vienna of 1816 it was transferred to Prussia, which made it the center of the Prussian Kreis or district. In this way, as the seat of government offices and schools, Brilon regained significance. The construction of traffic connections and various municipal measures brought about a strong development of crafts and trade.

In World War II the town was initially spared from Allied air raids. But on 10 January 1944 there came an attack by American bombers which destroyed whole streets, particularly Hoppecker Straße and Derkere Mauer. A bomb broke through the roof of the Provost's Church but did not explode. In this bombing raid 37 people were killed, including 13 children.

After the war Brilon became part of the newly created state of North Rhine-Westphalia. In the course of the local government reorganization of 1975 the following communities were added to the town: formerly administered by the Amt Thülen: Alme, Bontkirchen, Hoppecke, Madfeld, Messinghausen, Nehden (belonging to Thülen parish), Radlinghausen, Rixen, Rösenbeck, Scharfenberg, Thülen and Wülfte; and formerly belonging to the Amt Bigge: Altenbüren and Esshoff.

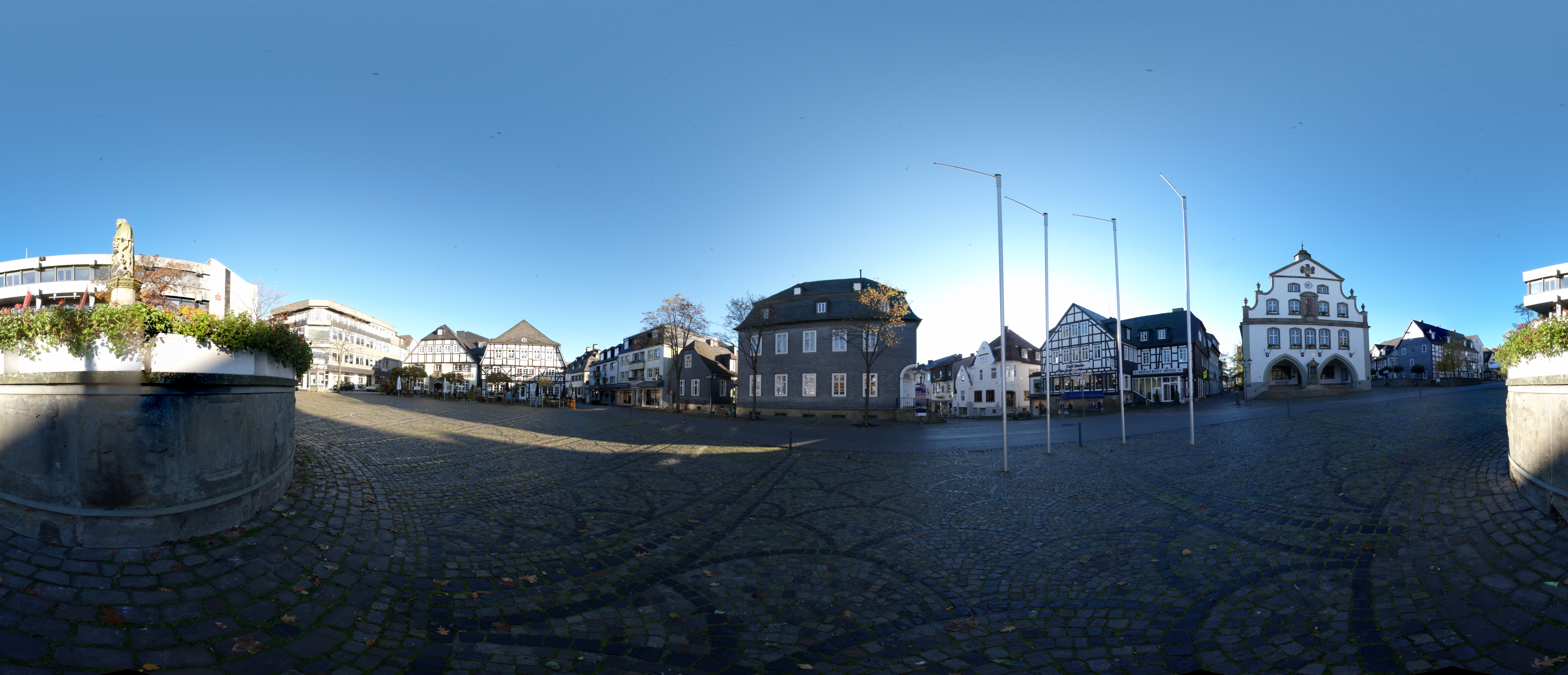
Brilon City

=== Population growth ===
The following numbers only show the population of the town of Brilon, not of the municipality.

- 2,592 inhabitants (1784), including 63 Jews 1)
- 3,584 inhabitants (1844), including 111 Evangelicals, 84 Jews
- 4,471 inhabitants (1890), including 231 Evangelicals, 95 Jews
- 5,849 inhabitants (1925)
- 6,480 inhabitants (1933)
- 6,959 inhabitants (1939)
- 14,305 inhabitants (1966)

1) Source: Vergangene Zeiten (Past times), volume 1 incl. the dependent communities (Filialgemeinden) Wülfte and Rixen

Historical population

Year	Pop.	±% p.a.
1965	23,060	—
1970	24,047	+0.84%
1975	24,589	+0.45%
1980	24,525	−0.05%
1985	24,484	−0.03%
1990	25,303	+0.66%
1995	27,258	+1.50%

Year	Pop.	±% p.a.
2000	27,347	+0.07%
2005	27,112	−0.17%
2010	26,335	−0.58%
2015	26,232	−0.08%
2020	25,336	−0.69%
2025	25,236	−0.08%

Source: Landesdatabank Nordrhein-Westfalen

=== Arms ===
The arms of Brilon are: Party per fess, in chief, argent, a cross sable, and in base, sable, a key in bend argent, wards to the dexter. They were granted on 28 January 1911, but in this form first appear in a seal of 1548. The cross in the upper part is from the arms of the Electorate of Cologne. The key, a motif which appears already in medieval seals, is one of the keys of Saint Peter, patron saint of Cologne.

== Twin towns – sister cities ==
Brilon is twinned with:

- Buckow, Germany
- Herbolzheim, Germany
- Hesdin, France
- Heusden-Zolder, Belgium
- Thurso, Scotland, United Kingdom

== Culture and sights ==
=== Museums ===
- Brilon Town Museum

=== Buildings ===
Brilon

- Derker Gate
- Evangelical Town Church (built in 1856 to plans by Schinkel)
- Geschichtsbrunnen (History Fountain)
- Church of St Nicholas
- Provost's Church of St Peter and St Andrew
- Town Hall and Market Place with the "Kump"
- Schultenhaus (House of the Mayor)
- Sauvigny House
- District Courthouse. Late Classical stuccoed building of 1877
- Residential buildings: Schulgasse 14, a two-storied rough stone building of 1431, 1659 and 1720 with half-timbered extensions; Steinweg 26, a half-timbered building of 1767 with older masonry

=== Parks ===
- Arnsberg Forest Nature Reserve
- Lake Diemel Nature Reserve
- Brilon Park

=== Regular events ===
- Schützenfest, last weekend in June
- Schnadegang or Schnadezug (marking the town boundaries) every second year on the Monday after the Schutzenfest
- Brilon Open Air Festival (street theatre and live music) in July or August
- Old Town Festival, at the end of August
- Kirmes, last weekend in September

== Economy and infrastructure ==
=== Communications ===
From Brilon heading westwards, approx 30 minutes away on the Bundesstraße B 7 is the motorway A 46 at Bestwig, in the direction of the Ruhrgebiet. Heading eastwards, the motorwayA 44 at Marsberg, in the direction of Kassel is about 40 minutes away. On the Bundesstraße B 480 it is possible to reach the highway A 33 at Wünnenberg in about 30 minutes, in the direction of Paderborn/Bielefeld.

Brilon Stadt station is near the town center. Brilon Wald station is about 10 km from the town center. From here local trains leave every hour for Warburg, Hagen and Korbach via Willingen.

From the air Brilon is accessible through the airport at Paderborn-Lippstadt. Sports-airplanes can land at Brilon Airport in the Thülener Bruch.

=== Media ===
The regional daily newspaper is the Westfalenpost, with a local edition for Brilon and the Hochsauerland district. Furthermore, there is the free weekly paper Sauerlandkurier with information from the whole of the Sauerland. Also weekly is the Briloner Anzeiger, a newspaper for Brilon, Olsberg, and Willingen.

=== Public organizations ===
- Brilon District Court
- Brilon Finance Office
- District administration for the Hochsauerland District, Brilon Office
- Hospital "Maria Hilf"

== Notable people ==
=== Honorary citizens ===
- Eduard Pape (1816–1888), lawyer, contributor to the Bürgerliche Gesetzbuch in 1887

=== Natives of the town ===
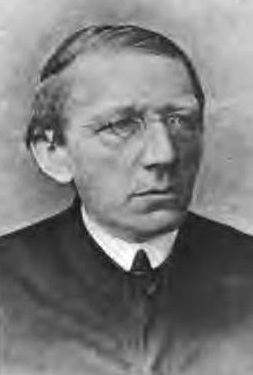
Franz Heinrich Reusch

- Johann Georg Weishaupt (1716–1753), professor of law at the University of Ingolstadt
- Johann Suibert Seibertz (1788–1871), historian and judge
- Franz Heinrich Reusch (1823–1900), Old Catholic theologian and church historian
- Paul Kleinschnittger (1909–1989), automotive engineer and producer of the Kleinschnittger cars
- Fritz Dorls (1910–1995), politician, Member of Bundestag, founder and President of the banned extreme-Right-wing party, the SRP
- Edgar Selge (born 1948), actor and writer
- Friedrich Merz (born 1955), Chancellor of Germany
- Birgit Schrowange (born 1958), TV presenter

== Other ==
In Brilon is the start of the 184 km long newly opened ramblers' trail across the Rothaar Mountains, the Rothaarsteig.

Brillion, Wisconsin is named after Brilon.

== Literature ==
- (in German) Provost's Office, Brilon(ed): Propsteikirche Brilon. 3rd. edition, Brilon 1988
- (in German) Thomas Spohn: Brilon (Westfälische Kunststätten, Heft 84). Münster 1997
- (in German) Vergangene Zeiten - Geschichte aus Brilon Band 1 (ISBN 3-86133-341-4)
