= Alme (river) =

River in Germany

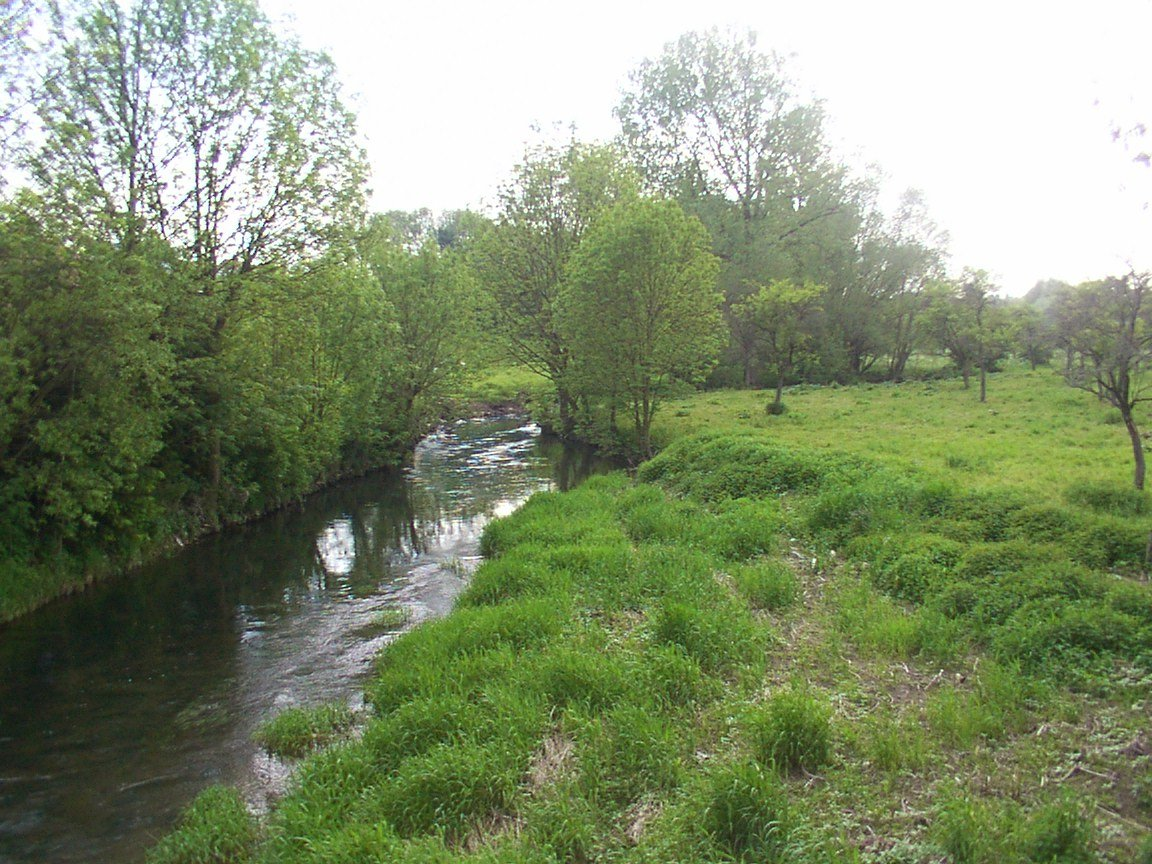

Location
- Country: Germany

Physical characteristics
- Source
  - location: Sauerland
  - elevation: ±340 m (1,120 ft)
- Mouth
  - location: Lippe
  - coordinates: 51°44′55″N 8°42′25″E
- Length: 59.4 km (36.9 mi)
- Basin size: 763 km^{2} (295 sq mi)

Basin features
- Progression: Lippe→ Rhine→ North Sea

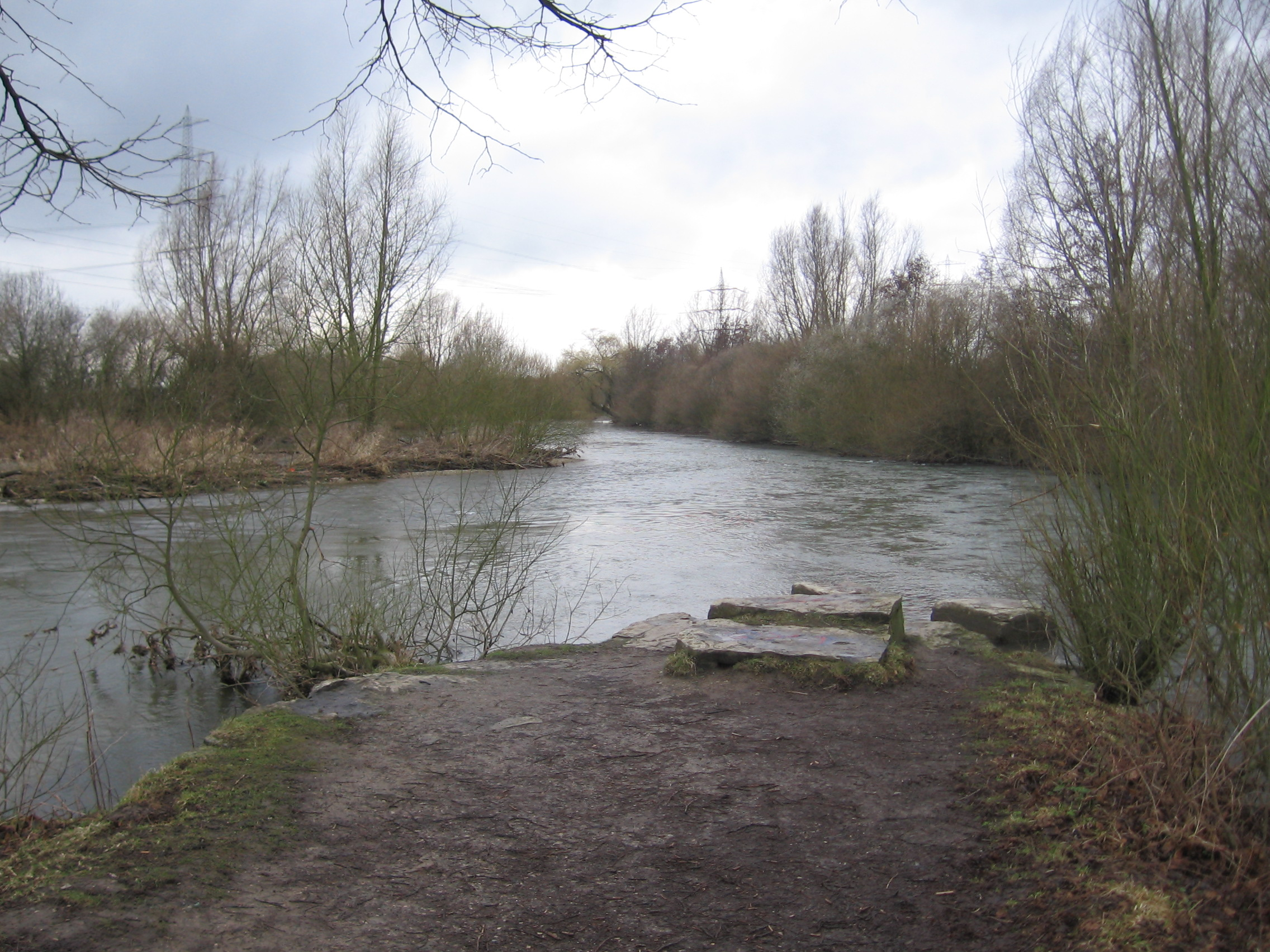
Mouth of the Alme.

The Alme (German pronunciation: [ˈalmə]) is a 59-kilometre (37 mi) long river in North Rhine-Westphalia, Germany. It is a left tributary of the Lippe, into which it flows near Paderborn. The Alme defines the Alme Valley and flows through the towns Büren, Borchen and Paderborn.

== Tributaries ==
- Nette
- Gosse (river)
- Afte
- Altenau

== History ==
=== Flood of 1965 ===
In July 1965 a devastating flood occurred, which became part of regional history as a once-in-a-hundred-years flooding and is remembered by locals as the "Heinrichsflut" (Henry's Day Flood). After heavy rainfalls from July 15 through to 17 (more than 135 L/m^{2}), basements were flooded. In the village of Wewelsburg a bridge collapsed, an Army sapper unit had to be brought in for disaster relief. Streets turned into river beds, railway and bus traffic had to be stopped, 16 people died. As a consequence of the flood, which also took in the tributaries of the Alme and the Lippe river itself, the "Wasserverband Obere Lippe" (board for basin management of the upper Lippe river) was founded, one of whose aims is to prevent or mitigate any damage that may be caused by further floods mainly by way of building detention basins.

=== Flood of 2007 ===
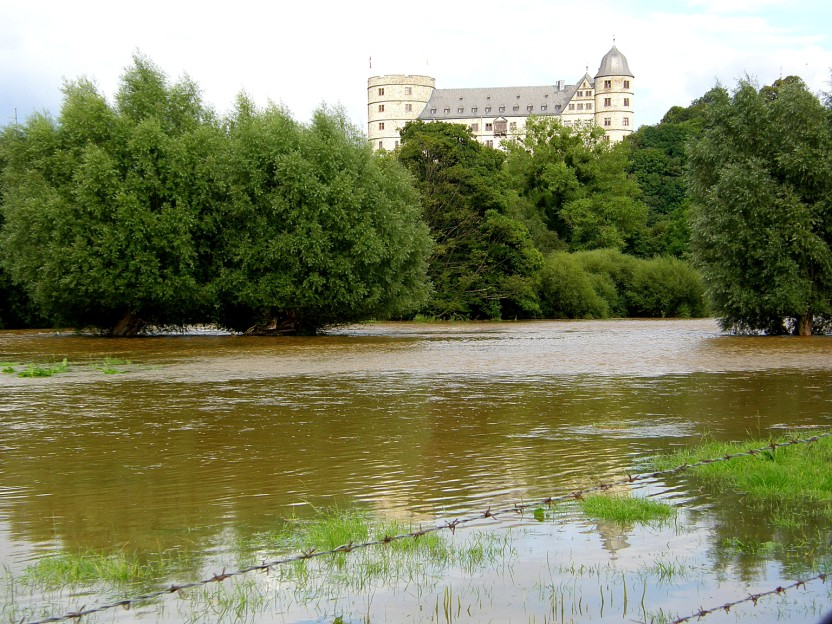
Flood of the Alme on August 22nd 2007 near Wewelsburg

On August 22, 2007, the Alme river burst its banks around the town of Büren, after heavy rainfalls of some 70 L/m^{2} in the course of one night. In the village of Weine the flood level exceeded that of 1965. Even though the flood was less sweeping in effect than the "Heinrichsflut", schools in Büren had to finish early and send the pupils home, some streets became impassable. 220 local firefighters supported by emergency response units of THW, DLRG and DRK were deployed to clear out flooded basements or to protect houses in low grounds by stacked sandbags.
