= Paderborn (district) =

Coordinates: 51°42′36″N 8°44′24″E

- District
- Flag Coat of arms
- Country: Germany
- State: North Rhine-Westphalia
- Adm. region: Detmold
- Founded: 1975
- Capital: Paderborn

Government
  - District admin.: Christoph Rüther (CDU)

Area
  - Total: 1,245.27 km^{2} (480.80 sq mi)

Population (31 December 2024)
  - Total: 315,912
  - Density: 253.690/km^{2} (657.053/sq mi)
- Time zone: UTC+01:00 (CET)
  - Summer (DST): UTC+02:00 (CEST)
- Vehicle registration: BÜR, PB
- Website: kreis-paderborn.de

Paderborn (German pronunciation: [paːdɐˈbɔʁn]) is a Kreis (district) in the east of North Rhine-Westphalia, Germany. Neighboring districts are Gütersloh, Lippe, Höxter, Hochsauerland, and Soest.

== History ==
Paderborn was part of the Bishopric of Paderborn until it was included into Prussia in 1802. After the Napoleonic Wars when Prussia created the province Westphalia it also created five districts roughly covering the area of the previous state - Brakel, Büren, Höxter, Paderborn and Warburg. In 1975 Paderborn and Büren districts were merged to the current Paderborn district. At the same time the towns and municipalities in the district were merged to form today's ten towns and municipalities. It is a rural district with urban municipalities.

== Geography ==
The Paderborn district is located at the western slope of the Teutoburg Forest, west of the Eggegebirge. The highest elevation is on the side of the Totenkopf (498 m) at the district border near Bleiwäsche (Bad Wünnenberg), the lowest near Delbrück at 77 m. The main river in the district is the Lippe, which has its source in Bad Lippspringe.

== Coat of arms ==
The red cross in chief of the coat of arms symbolizes the clerical state Paderborn, the historic precursor of today's district. The wave line below stands for the rivers in the district, especially the Lippe River. The symbol in the field derives from the Lords of Büren.

== Towns and municipalities ==
Clickable map of towns and municipalities in the district

Towns
Municipalities
1. Bad Lippspringe
2. Bad Wünnenberg
3. Büren
4. Delbrück
5. Lichtenau
6. Paderborn
7. Salzkotten
1. Altenbeken
2. Borchen
3. Hövelhof
