= Bad Wünnenberg =

Town in North Rhine-Westphalia, Germany

- Town
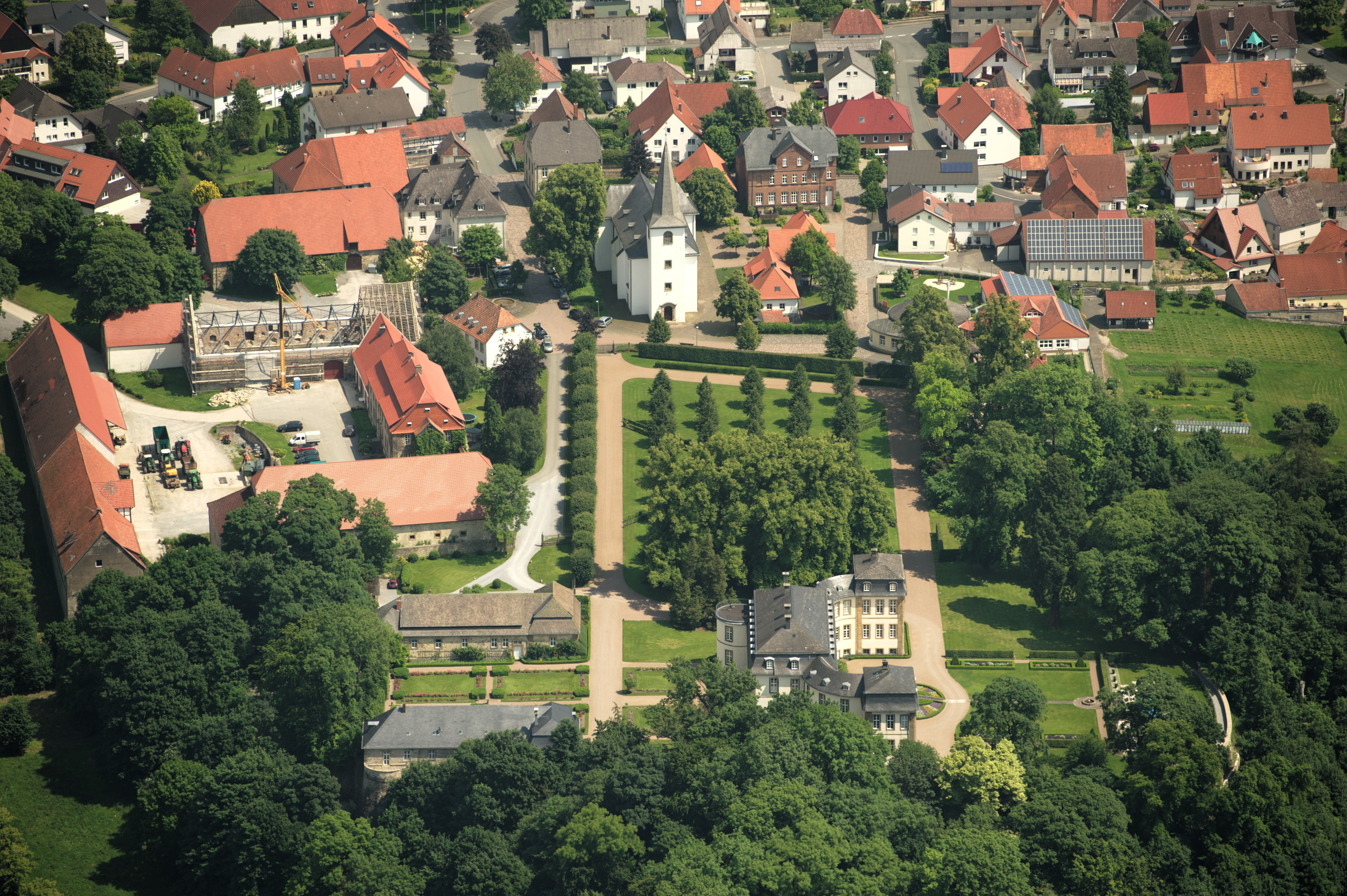

- Coat of arms

- Location of Bad Wünnenberg within Paderborn district
- Interactive map of Bad Wünnenberg
- Location within Germany Location within North Rhine-Westphalia
- Coordinates: 51°31′N 8°42′E
- Country: Germany
- State: North Rhine-Westphalia
- Admin. region: Detmold
- District: Paderborn
- Subdivisions: 7

Government
  - Mayor (2025–30): Ursula Berhorst-Schäfers (SPD)

Area
  - Total: 161.3 km^{2} (62.3 sq mi)
- Elevation: 334 m (1,096 ft)

Population (2025-12-31)
  - Total: 12,414
  - Density: 76.96/km^{2} (199.3/sq mi)
- Time zone: UTC+01:00 (CET)
  - Summer (DST): UTC+02:00 (CEST)
- Postal codes: 33179–33181
- Dialling codes: 02953, 02957 Haaren
- Vehicle registration: PB
- Website: www.wuennenberg.de

Bad Wünnenberg (German pronunciation: [baːt ˈvʏnənbɛʁk]) is a town in the district of Paderborn, in North Rhine-Westphalia, Germany. It is situated on the river Aabach, approximately 20 km south of Paderborn.

== Population ==
Historical population

Year	Pop.	±% p.a.
1965	8,058	—
1970	8,591	+1.29%
1975	9,088	+1.13%
1980	9,601	+1.10%
1985	9,833	+0.48%
1990	10,226	+0.79%
1995	11,670	+2.68%

Year	Pop.	±% p.a.
2000	12,165	+0.83%
2005	12,477	+0.51%
2010	12,256	−0.36%
2015	12,302	+0.07%
2020	12,206	−0.16%
2025	12,414	+0.34%

Source: Landesdatabank Nordrhein-Westfalen

== Politics ==
The current mayor of Bad Wünnenberg is Ursula Berhorst-Schäfers of the SPD, who has been serving since 2025. She won the 2025 election against her predecessor Christian Carl (CDU) with 54% of the vote.

=== City council ===
After the 2025 local elections, the Bad Wünnenberg city council is composed as follows:

Party	Votes	%	+/-	Seats	+/-
Christian Democratic Union (CDU)	3,406	52.3	▼3.7	17	▼1
Social Democratic Party (SPD)	2,103	32.3	▲8.5	10	▲3
Alliance 90/The Greens (Grüne)	574	8.8	▼3.3	3	▼1
Free Democratic Party (FDP)	436	6.7	▼1.5	2	▼1
Valid votes	6,519	96.8			
Invalid votes	218	3.2			
Total	6,737	100.0		32	±0
Electorate/voter turnout	10,207	66.0			
Source: City of Bad Wünnenberg
