= Hoppecke =

River in Germany

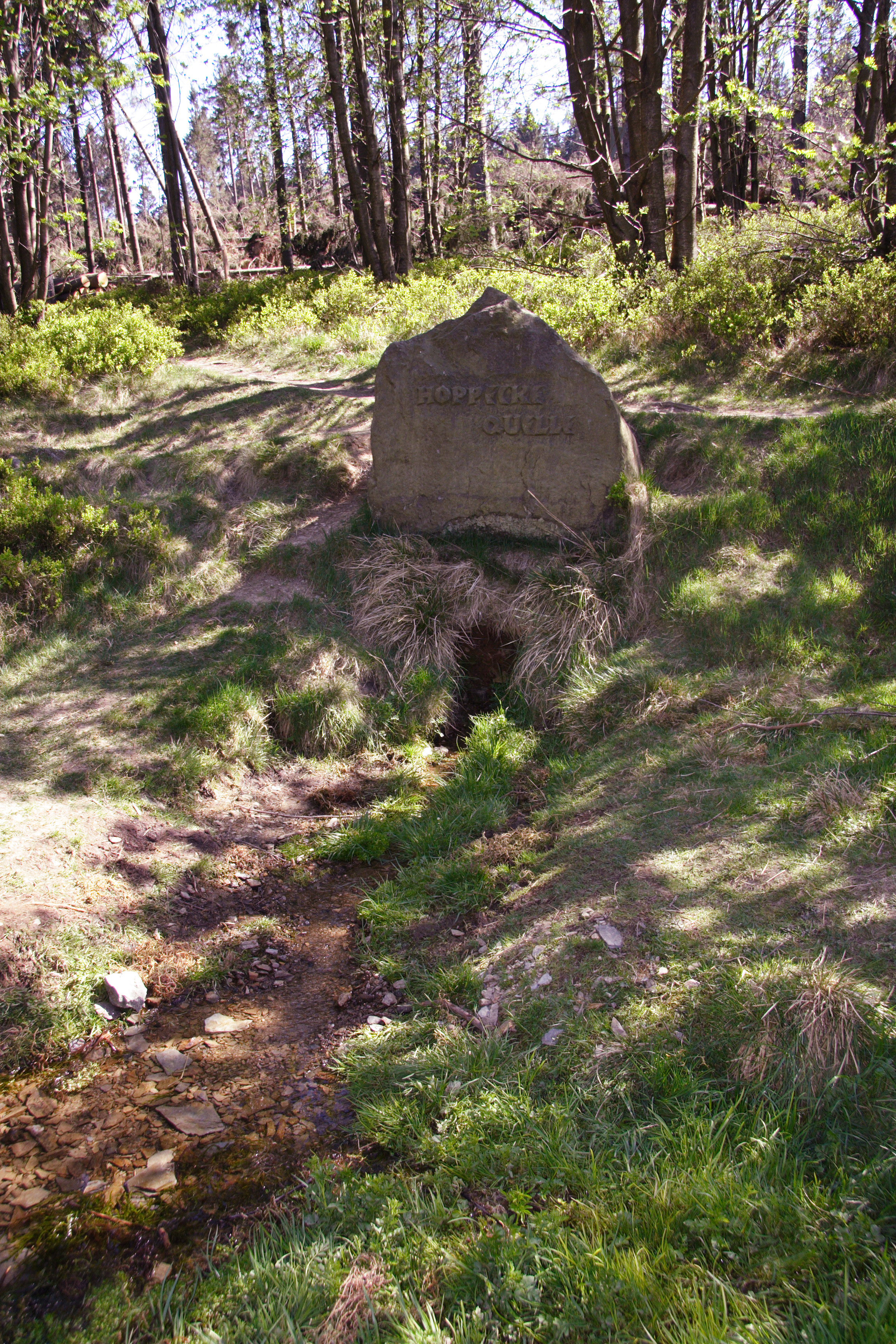

Location
- Country: Germany
- States: North Rhine-Westphalia and Hesse

Physical characteristics
- Mouth
  - location: Diemel
  - coordinates: 51.4306°N 8.8154°E
- Length: 34.7 km (21.6 mi)
- Basin size: 92 km^{2} (36 sq mi)

Basin features
- Progression: Diemel→ Weser→ North Sea

The Hoppecke is a river in North Rhine-Westphalia and Hesse, Germany, and a tributary of the Diemel. The Hoppecke joins the Diemel on the left bank near Marsberg.

== See also ==
- List of rivers of Hesse
