= AA =

AA, Aa, Double A, or Double-A may refer to:

== Arts, entertainment and media ==
- America's Army, a 2002 computer game published by the U.S. Army
- Ancient Anguish, a computer game in existence since 1992
- Aa!, a J-Pop musical group
- AA (band), South Korean boy band
- Aa (album), 2016, by Baauer
- "AA" (song), a 2021 single by Walker Hayes
- Ace Attorney, a series of video games developed by Capcom
- AA Films, an Indian film distribution company
- All American (TV series), a 2018 American sports drama series
- AA Book (disambiguation)
- "The Savages" (Doctor Who), a 1966 Doctor Who serial (production code "AA")
- Academy Award, in the film industry

== Brands, organizations and enterprises ==
=== Airlines ===
- Aerolíneas Argentinas, an Argentine airline
- AirAsia
- Air Austral airline, former logo
- American Airlines, IATA code
- Ascend Airways

=== Other organizations ===
- Alcoholics Anonymous, support organization
- A. A. Arms, a defunct firearms manufacturer
- Alcoa, a US aluminum producer, stock symbol
- Anadolu Agency, press agency, Turkey
- Arakan Army, Rakhine State, Myanmar, a rebel group
- Audio-Animatronics, used at Disney Parks
- Academia de Artes, Mexico
- Former US Amalgamated Association of Iron and Steel Workers
- Architectural Association School of Architecture, London, UK
- Astrological Association of Great Britain, London, UK
- Auswärtiges Amt, the Foreign Office of Germany
- Danish Association of Architects (Akademisk Arkitektforening)
- The AA, UK motoring organization
- AA Ireland, an Irish automotive services company
- AA Motoring Trust, merged into IAM Motoring Trust

== Education ==
- Albuquerque Academy, independent school in Albuquerque, New Mexico
- Appreciative advising, a method to enhance interactions between students and advisors
- Associate of Arts, an academic degree

== Philosophy and religion ==
- Aa Church, a church in Aakirkeby on the island of Bornholm
- A∴A∴, a spiritual organization created in 1907 by Aleister Crowley
- Abhisamayalankara, or Abhisamaya-alaṅkāra, a Mahayana Buddhist text
- Augustinians of the Assumption, a congregation of Catholic religious (priests and brothers)
- Statue of A'a from Rurutu, a wooden fertility-god sculpture from the Pacific island of Rurutu
- "A is A", an expression of the law of identity: each thing is identical with itself
- Iah, an ancient moon deity
- AA or A.A. (After Adam), year notation in the Mandean calendar

== Language ==
- aa, Latin-script digraph used in the orthographies of Dutch, Finnish, and other languages
- aa, representation of letter Å in several Scandinavian languages
- aa, a romanization of Arabic letter alif ⟨ا⟩
- Ꜳ, an orthographic ligature
- Afar language (ISO 639-1 language code aa)
- Africa Alphabet, alphabet used for African languages
- Aa (Bengali), a Bengali letter

== Measurements ==
- AA, a bra size
- AA, a width in shoe sizes
- AA battery size
- Attoampere (aA), 10^{−18} Ampere, a unit of electric current

== People ==
- Aa (surname), Scandinavian surname, including a list of people with this name
- Van der Aa (surname), Dutch surname, including a list of people with this name
- Aa (architect), in Ancient Egypt
- Anthony Armstrong (writer) (1897–1972), Anglo-Canadian writer who used the pseudonym A.A. when writing for Punch
- Allu Arjun (born 1982), Indian actor, often abbreviated as AA in film titles

== Places ==
- Aa, Estonia, a village and beach in Estonia
- Aa, Indonesia, a populated place in the South Sulawesi province of Indonesia
- Albania, LOC MARC code
- Ann Arbor, Michigan, US
- Anne Arundel County, Maryland, US
- Antarctica, WMO country code
- Aruba, FIPS country code

== Rivers ==
=== Germany ===
- Aabach (Afte), formerly Große Aa, North Rhine-Westphalia
- Aa (Möhne), North Rhine-Westphalia
- Aa (Nethe), North Rhine-Westphalia
- Aa (Werre), North Rhine-Westphalia
- Bocholter Aa, North Rhine-Westphalia
- Dreierwalder Aa, North Rhine-Westphalia
- Kleine Aa (Aabach), a tributary of the Aabach in North Rhine-Westphalia
- Große Aa, a tributary of the Ems in Lower Saxony
- Große Aa (Aabach), a tributary of the Aabach in North Rhine-Westphalia
- Münstersche Aa, North Rhine-Westphalia
- Schaler Aa, Lower Saxony and North Rhine-Westphalia
- Speller Aa, Lower Saxony and North Rhine-Westphalia
- Steinfurter Aa, North Rhine-Westphalia

=== Netherlands ===
- Aa (Meuse), North Brabant
- Aa of Weerijs, North Brabant
- Drentsche Aa, Drenthe and Groningen
- Ruiten Aa, a river in Westerwolde, Groningen

=== Switzerland ===
- Aabach (Aare), a tributary of the Aare, in Aargau canton
- Aabach (Greifensee) or Ustermer Aa, in canton of Zürich
- Aabach (Obersee), a tributary of Obersee (Zürichsee), in canton of St. Gallen
- Aabach (Seetal), in the cantons of Lucerne and Aargau
- Chli Aa (Sempachersee), a tributary of Lake Sempach in the canton of Lucerne
- Engelberger Aa, in the cantons of Obwalden and Nidwalden
- Gross Aa (Sempachersee), a tributary of Lake Sempach in the canton of Lucerne
- Mönchaltorfer Aa, a tributary of Greifensee in canton of Zürich
- Sarner Aa (river), Obwalden, tributary of Lake Lucerne

=== Elsewhere ===
- Aa (Nete), in the province of Antwerp, Belgium; a tributary of the Nete
- Aa (France)
- Gauja, Latvia, formerly known as Livländische Aa
- Lielupe, Latvia, formerly known as Kurländische Aa

== Science, technology, and mathematics ==
=== Biology ===
- Aa (plant), a genus of orchid
- Aa (gastropod), a subgenus of snail

=== Chemistry ===
- Arachidonic acid, a polyunsaturated fatty acid
- Azidoazide azide

=== Computing ===
- AA, Audible.com file format
- AA tree in computer science
- Adobe Animate, an animation software
- Advanced Architecture, later Amiga Advanced Graphics Architecture
- Atlas Autocode, a computer programming language
- Authoritative Answer bit, in DNS, a flag for a query answer
- ASCII Art, in internet slang
- Shift JIS art, in Japanese internet slang

=== Mathematics ===
- AA postulate of Euclidean geometry
- Abstract algebra, a branch of mathematics

=== Medicine ===
- AA amyloidosis
- Alopecia areata, a condition in which hair is lost from areas of the body
- Anesthesiologist assistant; see certified anesthesiologist assistant
- Aplastic anemia, a disease

=== Other uses in science and technology ===
- Anti-aircraft, in military use
- Attoampere (aA), 10^{−18} Ampere, a unit of electric current

== Sports ==
=== Baseball ===
- Double-A (baseball) or Class AA, a Minor League Baseball classification level
- American Association (1882–1891), US baseball league
- American Association (1902–1997), US baseball league
- American Association of Professional Baseball, North American baseball league

=== Other sports ===
- Athletics Australia
- All-America, American amateur athletic award
- All-Australian team, all-star team of Australian rules footballers
- Amateur Athletic Union, US, since 1884

== Transportation ==
- AA Highway, Kentucky, US
- Former Ann Arbor Railroad (1895–1976), Ohio and Michigan
- Ann Arbor Railroad (1988), Ohio and Michigan
- Former K line, New York City Subway, formerly "AA"
- NZR A^{A} class, a New Zealand locomotive class
- Magelang, Purworejo, Kebumen, Temanggung and Wonosobo (vehicle registration prefix AA)

== Other uses ==
- ʻAʻā or aa, a form of lava
- A term for "river" in German hydronymy; see Aach (toponymy)
- Anna's Archive, a search engine for shadow libraries
- Asian Aerospace, an air show in Asia
- European Union Association Agreement
- US armed forces in the Americas (postal abbreviation AA)

== See also ==
- AAA (disambiguation)
- Grosse Aa (disambiguation)
- Kleine Aa (disambiguation)
- A Aa, a film
- Automobile Association (disambiguation)
