= Vorthgraben =

River in Germany

Location
- Country: Germany
- State: North Rhine-Westphalia

Physical characteristics
- Mouth
  - location: Speller Aa
  - coordinates: 52.3137°N 7.8167°E

Basin features
- Progression: Speller Aa→ Große Aa→ Ems→ North Sea

Vorthgraben is a small river of North Rhine-Westphalia, Germany. It flows into the Speller Aa near Mettingen.

== See also ==
- List of rivers of North Rhine-Westphalia
