= Große Aa (disambiguation) =

The Große Aa is a tributary of the Ems in Lower Saxony, Germany.

Große Aa may also refer to:

- Gross Aa (Sempachersee), a tributary of Lake Sempach in the canton of Lucerne, Switzerland
- Große Aa (Aabach), a tributary of the Aabach in North Rhine-Westphalia, Germany
- Große Aa, an alternative name for the middle course of the Aabach (Afte), a tributary of the Afte in North Rhine-Westphalia, Germany

== See also ==
- AA (disambiguation)
