= Fishing industry in Switzerland =

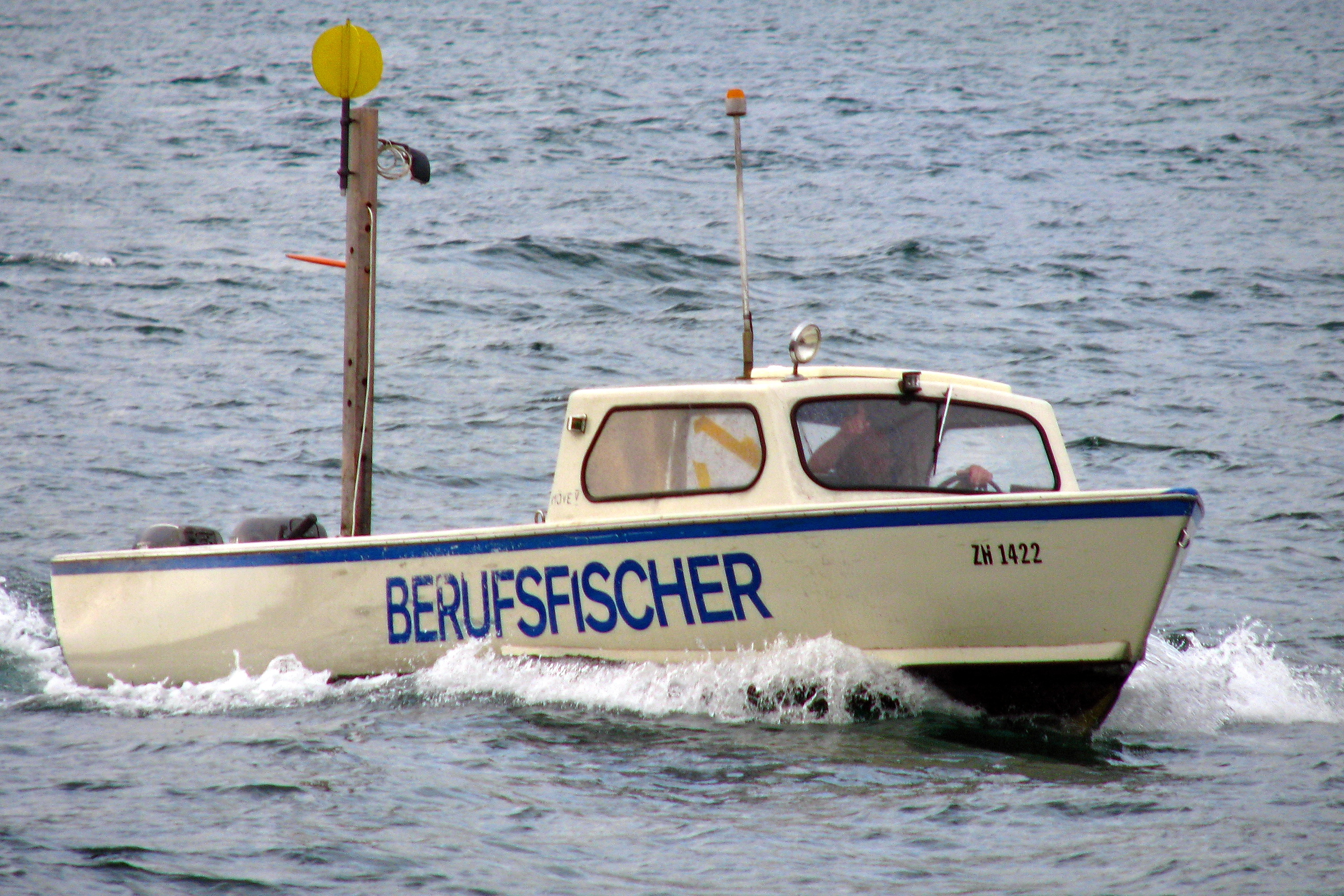
A professional fishing boat on Lake Zurich

Landlocked Switzerland supports a small commercial fishing industry in its many large lakes. About 200 fishermen nationally ply them in small boats, supplemented by fish farmers who largely raise trout and some carp. The former catch primarily perch and whitefish, with pike, lake trout and Arctic char making up significant portions of the country's 12,000-tonne (13,000-short-ton; 12,000-long-ton) annual catch. Angling is also popular, while fish processing is marginal, largely limited to making fish oil for the country's drug industry.

While some of the Swiss catch is exported, mostly to neighboring countries, the country runs a large trade deficit in fish and fish products, with imports serving most of the market, largely in the food sector, as tastes have shifted towards seafood. Within Switzerland, the French-speaking population consumes 60 percent of the fish, three times its share of the population.

Switzerland's largest lake, Lake Geneva, shared with France, is also its most productive fishery, providing a fifth of the total catch, including almost half its perch. Lake Zurich, fifth largest by area, is the second most productive Swiss fishery, with the largest share of the country's whitefish catch. Lake Neuchâtel produces the largest portion of lake trout, and small Lake Sempach is fourth in whitefish. The smallest Swiss lake that supports a commercial fishery is Lake Hallwil.

Fish have been an important part of the Swiss diet since at least the Middle Ages; by the late 17th century catches in Lake Geneva were being strictly regulated. Today the cantons are the primary fishing regulators, with federal law setting the guiding principles; the large lakes that Switzerland shares with its neighboring countries are managed by international commissions. The total number of fishermen has declined in the late 20th and early 21st centuries along with catches, a phenomenon the fishermen attribute to the country's success in reducing pollution in its lakes, to the point that aquaculture now accounts for the majority of the industry's output.

== History ==
=== Prehistory–Roman era: Archaeological evidence ===
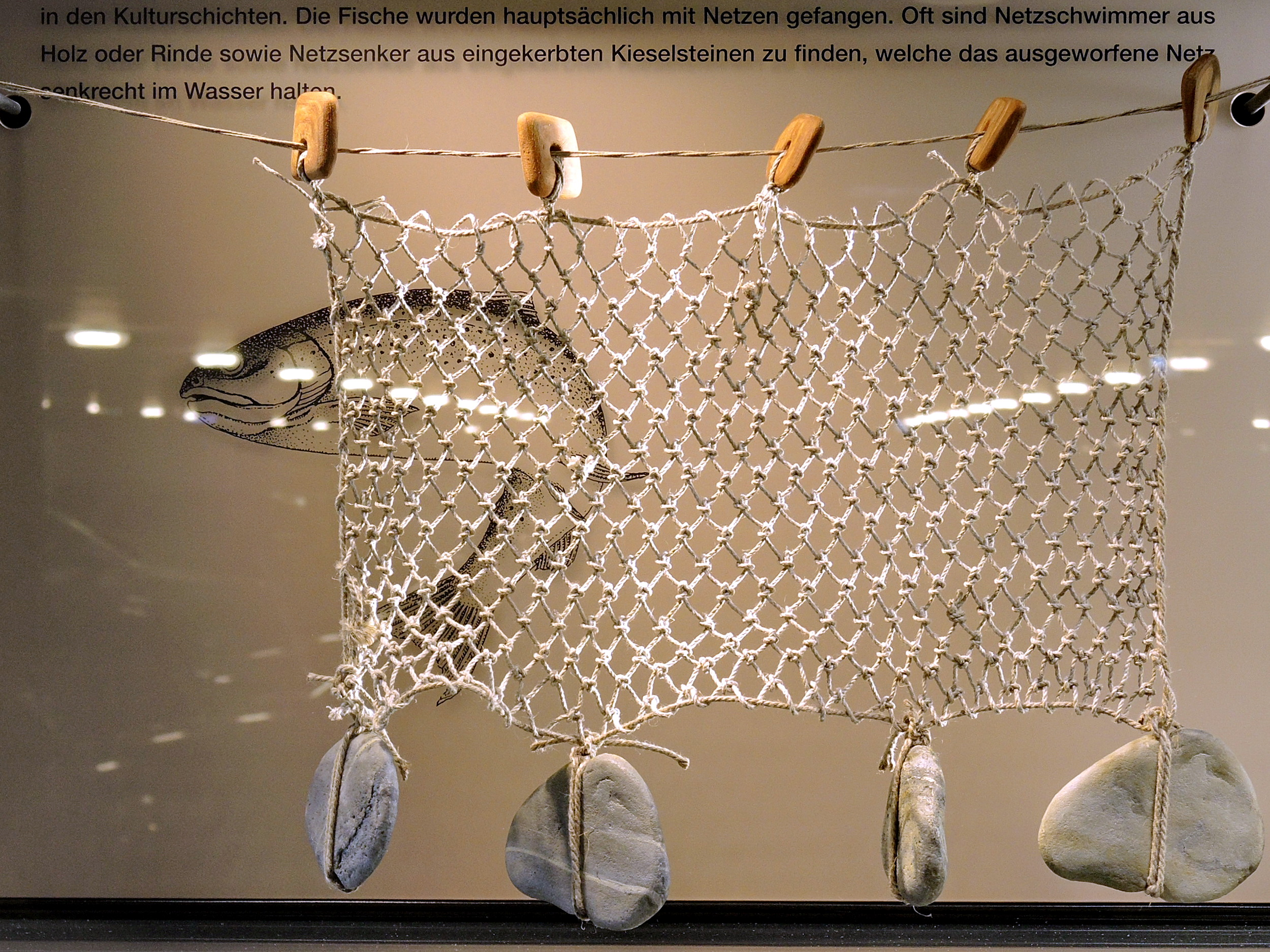
Neolithic Horgen culture fishing net excavated in Zürich

Paleolithic archaeological sites in Switzerland have yielded extensive evidence of fishing in the lakes. Those associated with Cortaillod culture have well-documented fishing nets and traps, along with other tools such as harpoons and skewers. Fishermen of that era, it is believed, primarily used the seine fishing, stretching nets between a boat and a stake planted in the lake bottom in shallow waters and between two boats in deep water, sometimes supplemented by gill nets or longlines. (Note: "Die effizienteste Methode war die Zuggarnfischerei: Der Fischer umschloss auf dem See Bezirk («Zug») für Bezirk mit einem Garn, zog dieses mit einem Sack versehene Netz kreisförmig zusammen und hob den Fang aus dem Wasser. Auf der Weite des Sees arbeiteten er und sein Gehilfe mit zwei Booten, in Ufernähe mit einem Boot und einem in den Seegrund gerammten Pfahl, an dem sie das Garn befestigten. Weiter benutzte der Fischer Stellnetze, die er in einer Linie auslegte, eine gewisse Zeit im Wasser beliess und dann einzog.")

Evidence from the Roman era supports the existence of a trade in fish products. Sealed amphorae found at Aventicum contained garum, a popular condiment of the times made from spices and marine fish, and allec, a paste used as a precursor. By the Middle Ages, the Swiss had also begun importing herring, dried sole and other stockfish caught in the Baltic Sea from those cities in what is now Germany. (Note: "In Aventicum wurden zum Beispiel römerzeitliche Transportgefässe für Allec und Garum, Fischsaucen zum Würzen, gefunden. Im Mittelalter wurden aus dem Nordseeraum gepökelte Heringe in Fässern, Plattisle (konservierte Seezunge) sowie getrocknete Fische (Stockfisch) importiert.")

=== Middle Ages: Feudal regulation ===
Coat of arms of Nyon

Fish were commercially important at least around Lake Geneva by the middle of the 12th century. A declaration of tribute made to the Priory of St. Jean de Genéve in 1150 includes wine, cheese, and several large fish. The species named include trout, pike and omble chevalier, known in English as the Arctic char. It is the earliest mention of the latter species' presence in Lake Geneva.

There was enough fishing on Lake Geneva in the early Middle Ages to require regulation. In 1312 France's King Philip IV decreed that all nets used to take fish on the lake had to have a minimum mesh size of 25.5 mm (1 inch), the width of a silver tornesel coin. There was also a size minimum for caught fish. (Note: "Les premières mesure de protection des poissons connues de Forel (1904) datent de 1312, lorsque Phillipe-le-Bel ordonna l'usage d'engins de pêche dont les mailles mesuraient 25,5 mm (la taille d'un «gros tournois d'argent») et l'obligation de prendre less poissons ayant atteint certaines dimensions minimales.") The fish on Nyon's coat of arms dates to this time as well; the blue and red background represents its passage from the cold lake water to the hot kitchen. Regulation of fishing on Lake Constance similarly dates to the mid-14th century.

Commercial capture and consumption of fish from other lakes and rivers in what is now Switzerland also dates to medieval times. Records dating from the 15th century record an annual take from Lake Sempach averaging around 180,000 whitefish. (Note: "Zahlen über Fangerträge sind vom Sempachersee vom 15. Jahrhundert an überliefert (durchschnittlich 180'000 Felchen pro Jahr).") Archaeological digs in the northern and eastern regions of the country have found evidence of consumption, and long distance trade with other inland-fishery regions of Central Europe, that corroborates the documentary record of the period. Larger fish were caught by professional fishermen and eaten by nobility, landed gentry and the higher-ranking clergy, while smaller fish were caught and consumed across the social spectrum, primarily by those who ate them.

Under Roman law, fishing rights in rivers and lakes were royal property; most sovereigns delegated those rights to monasteries or local vassals, who in turn allocated them to local fishermen as they saw fit. The open water in the middle of the lakes was common fishing ground; the shallows near the shore were reserved for the local landowner. By the late medieval period, cities had also gained control over fishing rights in waters beyond their immediate vicinity in order to keep them clear for navigation. (Note: "Die Fischerei war ein Regal; die Nutzung schiffbarer Flüsse und grosser Seen gehörte nach römischem Recht dem König. Im Mittelalter sind noch wenige Fischrechte als Reichslehen fassbar, die meisten waren an Klöster oder weltliche Herren und von diesen an die effektiven Nutzer verliehen. Im Spätmittelalter sicherten sich die Städte durch Vertrag oder stillschweigende Unterwerfung unter ihren Bann Einfluss auf Gewässer, die über das eigentliche Stadtgebiet hinausgingen. Die Obrigkeit drängte bei den Wasserstrassen stets darauf, sie für die Schifffahrt offenzuhalten.")

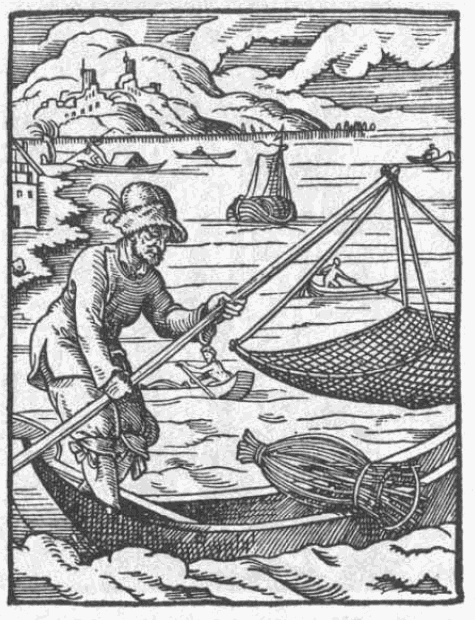
A Swiss fisherman with net and trap, as depicted by Jost Amman in a 16th-century woodcut

By the early 14th century, fishermen were part of the guilds of various professions—boatmen, mostly, but also bakers, butchers, coopers and weavers—in different cities. (Note: "Die Fischer waren in Zürich (1336), Bern (1342), Basel (1354) und Neuenburg (1482) mit den Schiffleuten zu einer Zunft zusammengefasst, in Luzern mit den Metzgern, in Chur mit den Bäckern, in Biel mit den Webern und Küfern.") In collaboration with the authorities, they negotiated detailed fishing regulations, covering when certain fish could be caught, minimum sizes, maximum quantities, and what equipment could be used to catch them, all with the goal of preventing overfishing. (Note: "Die Obrigkeit erliess in Absprache mit den Fischern bestimmte Vorschriften: Fangbeschränkungen, Schonzeiten oder Mindestmasse, minimale Maschenweiten sowie weitere Einschränkungen und Verbote bezüglich der eingesetzten Geräte.")

In 1690, fears of overfishing again led to new regulations on Lake Geneva. Authorities on all jurisdictions in the lakes basin limited the use of fyke nets to the days between March 15 and June 15 annually, to allow certain species to replenish themselves. A minimum size for net mesh was also imposed. (Note: "En 1690, des mesures commune furent même édictées dan tous les pays riverains du Léman, dont l'interdiction de pêcher au moyen de verveux ... du 15 mars au 15 juin afin de permettre aux populations de poissons, qui tendaient à se raréfier, d'augmenter leurs effectifs.")

Once fishermen had accumulated a catch worth taking to market, the rules required they first sell them in the city they worked from, in order to ensure a steady and affordable supply of fish for public consumption. An inspector saw to the freshness of fish and that no species were offered for sale that had been taken out of season; fishermen were also required to report any others they saw violating those rules. They were not permitted to sell to a reseller, but they could hire someone to handle the task of selling the fish. Women were excluded from the trade—by law in Bern, Biel and Lausanne, by custom elsewhere. (Note: "Um die Bevölkerung mit genügend und preiswertem Fisch zu versorgen, bestand Marktpflicht: Die Fischer mussten ihren Fang auf dem lokalen Markt anbieten, bevor sie ihn – wenn überhaupt – in andere Städte ausführten. Zwischenhandel war verboten, doch durfte jeder Fischer mit einem Vertragspartner, dem Gemeinder, zusammenarbeiten, der in der Stadt den Verkauf des Fangs übernahm. Die Marktaufsicht, die Einhaltung des Frischegebots und des Handelsverbots mit geschonten Fischen oblag dem Fischbeschauer; zusätzlich waren alle Fischer zur Denunzierung verpflichtet (Leidepflicht). Frauen waren (ausdrücklich z.B. in Bern, Biel oder Lausanne) vom Fischhandel ausgeschlossen.")

=== 19th century: Federal and cantonal regulation ===
Fishing regulations were enforced by the clergy and nobility through their exclusive control of fishing rights, a system that had spread to other Swiss lakes from Lake Geneva until 1798, when their rights were abrogated as "feudal" in the wake of the French Revolution, leaving fisheries unregulated. Several years of overfishing followed, leading to fishermen agreeing to limits again in 1803 after the Act of Mediation. The 17 cantons in which Switzerland's commercially fished lakes lie used powers delegated to them under the 1815 Federal Treaty to begin regulating fishing. As Switzerland began organizing itself into a modern federal state in the middle of the 19th century, the cantons further reasserted control over the lakes. (Note: "Unter dem Einfluss der Französischen Revolution wurden 1798 die bestehenden Fischenzen zu Feudalrechten erklärt und deshalb aufgehoben. Die Folgen davon waren trotz einschränkender Bestimmungen, die das Direktorium 1798 und 1802 erlassen hatte, eine starke Übernutzung der Fischgewässer. Bereits 1803 wurde aus volkswirtschaftlichen Gründen das Prinzip der freien Fischerei wieder aufgegeben ... mit der Mediationsakte und dem Bundesvertrag von 1815 kehrte die alte Vielfalt kantonaler Vorschriften zurück.")

The canton of Zürich was one of the first to go beyond the use of regulations to keep fisheries sustainable when it established Switzerland's first fish hatchery at Meilen in 1854. It used a new French technique to artificially inseminate fish eggs. After being hatched in closed facilities, the fry were released into rivers, streams and lakes so that they could be caught. By 1880 there were 24 more hatcheries in the country. (Note: "Ursprünglich erneuerten sich die Fischbestände durch die natürliche Fortpflanzung der Fische im freien Gewässer. In der ersten Hälfte des 19. Jahrhunderts wurde in Frankreich eine Methode der künstlichen Besamung von Fischeiern entwickelt. Diese wurden in geschlossenen Anlagen erbrütet und die Fischchen nach dem Schlüpfen in geeignete Gewässer ausgesetzt. Damit war der Weg offen für eine gezielte Bewirtschaftung der Fliessgewässer und Seen (Prinzip Säen und Ernten). Die erste schweizerische Brutanstalt wurde 1854 vom Kanton Zürich in Meilen erbaut. 1880 bestanden in der Schweiz schon 25 solcher Anlagen.")

After nearly a quarter-century of negotiations, the cantons of Vaud, Fribourg and Neuchâtel reached an agreement on managing Lake Neuchâtel in 1869; it came into force two years later. All three surrendered control over their portion of the lake in order to establish a consistent regime on its entirety. It has been updated ten times since then. (Note: "Depuis le 1er juillet 1871, la pêche dans le lac de Neuchâtel est régie par des Concordats intercantonaux. Cette date marque en effet l'entrée en vigueur du premier traité conclu entre les cantons de Neuchâtel, Vaud et Fribourg ... Un premier contact avait été pris entre les autorités fribourgeoises et vaudoises en 1843 déjà pour étudier un tel projet qui, en 1869, suscitait encore de vives oppositions ... Si l'on voulait soumettre les pêcheurs à une législation commune, il fallait que les cantons acceptent de perdre la souveraineté qu'ils exerçaient sur leurs eaux territoriales respectives ... Quelque cent ans plus tard, les pêcheurs sont toujours soumis à un Concordat intercantonal; c'est le dixième depuis 1869")

In 1875 the federal government eventually passed the first Federal Fisheries Law, (FFL) which establishes broad principles of fisheries management. It delegated as much fisheries regulation as possible to the cantons, who usually assigned their police or revenue departments with enforcement and only appointing special fisheries agents during spawning season. Those cantons whose lakes were shared with neighboring countries with working with those countries to jointly regulate the lake fisheries. By the early 1880s Switzerland had reached agreements with France, Italy, Baden and Alsace-Lorraine (the latter two now part of Germany and France respectively).

By this time fishing professionally, previously done on the side by farmers, vintners and other tradesmen, had evolved into a full-time job for more of those who took to the lakes. To protect their interests, primarily the maintenance of a healthy and sustainable fishery, some of these fishermen joined with scientists and sympathetic politicians to form the Swiss Fisheries Association (SFA). Its goals were twofold: to promote measures to protect the fisheries, especially as industrialization spread and hydroelectric plants were built to power new factories and facilities, and to promote research into the fisheries. (Note: "Alarmiert durch den mit der Industrialisierung (Bau von Wasserkraftwerken, Gewässerverschmutzung) zusammenhängenden Rückgang der Fischbestände, gründeten namhafte Persönlichkeiten aus Wissenschaft, Politik und Anglerkreisen 1883 den Schweizerischen Fischerei-Verband (SFV). Dieser machte es sich zur Aufgabe, die Interessen der Fischerei in den Bereichen Wasserbau, Wasserwirtschaft und Gewässerschutz zu vertreten sowie fischereiwirtschaftliche Massnahmen zur Hebung der Bestände und die fischereiwissenschaftliche Forschung zu fördern.")

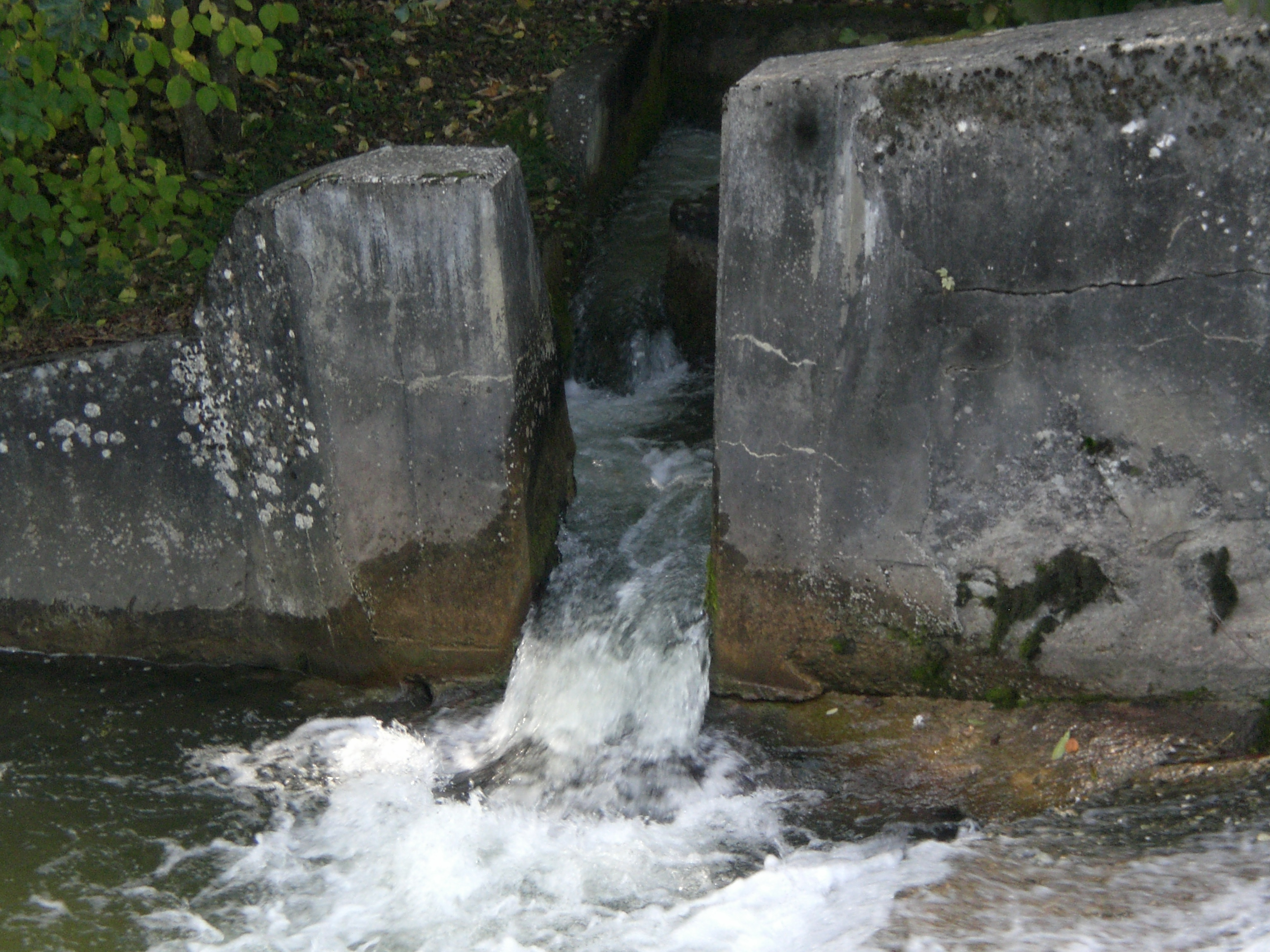
A fish ladder on the Promenthouse, a tributary of Lake Geneva

Efforts to conserve and protect species began shortly afterwards as well. Fish ladders were built in streams at several locations to facilitate a return to spawning grounds. A report was also prepared on water pollution in the Basel industrial district and its effect on the local fish population. By 1880 the value of the annual catch was estimated at SFr 2.5–3 million. The first of three revisions to the Federal Fisheries Law was made in 1888, taking account of water pollution and setting a framework for cantonal law. (Note: "1880 wurde der Wert der gefangenen Fische auf 2,5 bis 3 Mio. Franken geschätzt. ... 1875 wurde, gestützt auf Artikel 25 der Bundesverfassung von 1874, ein erstes, noch sehr rudimentäres Bundesgesetz über die Fischerei erlassen. Dieses wurde 1888 durch ein zweites ersetzt, das bereits erste Bestimmungen über die Verunreinigung von Gewässern enthielt. Als Rahmengesetz stand es im Einklang mit den genehmigungspflichtigen kantonalen und interkantonalen Gesetzen. Das dritte Bundesgesetz aus dem Jahr 1973 legte grosses Gewicht auf die Nachhaltigkeit des Ertrags und die Förderung der sogenannt wertvollen Fischarten, während das vierte von 1991 die Erhaltung und Wiederherstellung der natürlichen Artenvielfalt der einheimischen Fische, Krebse und Fischnährtiere unabhängig von deren wirtschaftlichen Stellenwert in den Vordergrund rückte") In 1893, the German states of Baden, Württemberg (now merged) and Bavaria signed the Bregenz Agreement with Switzerland and Austria, the first regulatory framework covering the entire lake.

In 1887 the rainbow trout was introduced to Lake Geneva and other Swiss waters from its native North America at a time when the true féra, long one of the most popular and abundant fish in Lake Geneva, was being fished to extinction. (Note: Today it has been substituted with the close relative the palée, successfully reintroduced to Lake Geneva from Lake Neuchâtel.) It has remained popular with diners but not with fishermen since it tends to eat the eggs of native species. Another North American transplant, catfish, was introduced at the end of the century by a Geneva city councilor who had found it delicious on a trip to Canada. It has thrived despite being another species fishermen resent because it eats primarily the eggs and fry of other species. The experience led later to laws regulating the introduction of nonnative fish species.

=== 20th century: Environmental challenges ===
In the 20th century the amount of full-time professional fishermen continued to grow. Political pressure from those fishermen on Lake Geneva, particularly from Vaud, led the federal government to withdraw in 1911 from the 1880 agreement with France, seven years after it had been renewed and updated, on the grounds that French fishermen on the lake were not respecting its terms. (Note: 1880 bis 1911: Ein erstes internationales Abkommen über eine gemeinsame Fischereibewirtschaftung zwischen Savoyen und den Schweizer Kantonen kommt zur Anwendung. Dieses Abkommen wird von der Schweiz auf Drängen der Waadtländer Berufsfischer aufgekündigt. Damit regelt jedes Land die Fischerei für sich allein.) Two years later Vaud joined with the neighboring cantons of Geneva and Valais to regulate fishing in the Swiss portion of the lake, under the same general terms as the 1904 agreement with France. (Note: "Dès 1913, les cantons de Genève, Vaud et Valais conclurent un concordat intercantonal, qui reprenait pour l'essentiel les dispositions de l'accord international de 1904")

France and Switzerland tried unsuccessfully to negotiate a new agreement in 1924 (Note: "Une tentative de conclure un nouvel accord franco-suisse en 1924 n'ayant pas aboutit ..."), the same year professional fishermen formed the Swiss Professional Fishermen's Association. Fears that this growth could lead to overfishing were met with restrictions on newer, stronger nets used for bottom fishing and, in the middle of the century, a cap on the number of licenses issued by the cantons, in favor of full-time fishermen with the best training and equipment. (Note: "... den 1924 ins Leben gerufenen Schweizerischen Berufsfischerverband auf ... In gewissen Seen wurde im Lauf des 20. Jahrhunderts die unselektive Garnfischerei untersagt, weil infolge des Einsatzes neuer Kunststoffnetze die Gefahr der Überfischung drohte. In der zweiten Hälfte des 20. Jahrhunderts vollzog sich bei den Netzfischern ein staatlich gelenkter Schrumpfungs- und Umwandlungsprozess. Einerseits reduzierten die Kantone die Zahl der Netzpatente (1948 zählte man 1132, 2008 nur noch 323 Netzfischer)")

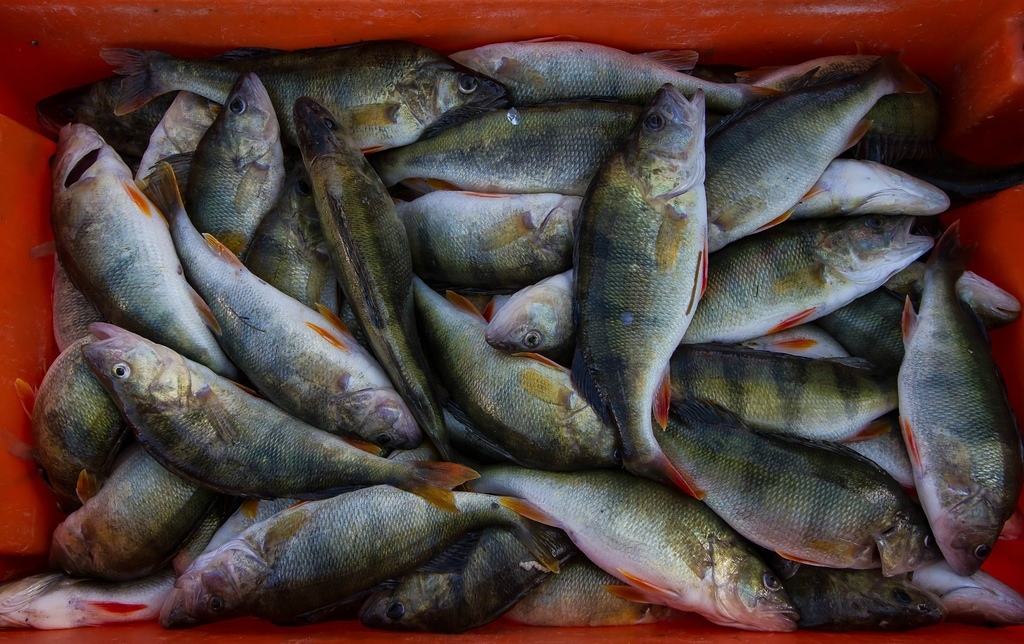
Perch became more popular in the 1950s

The introduction of artificial fiber nets in the 1950s allowed perch to emerge as a popular species. While it had always been taken and eaten, a fisherman who put some of the perch in his catch through an industrial potato peeler found that it neatly removed the fish's scales and skin, leaving behind two boneless filets ready for preparation and cooking; local restaurants came up with their own recipes, and by the end of the century demand for perch filets had grown to the point where most had to be imported.

Water pollution grew into a large enough problem to adversely affect the Swiss fishing industry by the middle of the 20th century. Annual fish catches began declining from record levels, forcing some longtime fishermen to leave the industry. Phosphates, from detergent, fertilizer, and other sources, draining into the lakes and slowly causing eutrophication were identified as the primary cause, and beginning in the 1970s environmental regulations were promulgated and enforced. The third revision of the FFL, in 1973, emphasized sustainability of yields and the protection of particularly valuable species. (Note: "Das dritte Bundesgesetz aus dem Jahr 1973 legte grosses Gewicht auf die Nachhaltigkeit des Ertrags und die Förderung der sogenannt wertvollen Fischarten ...")

In 1980, France and Switzerland returned to the negotiating table and reached a new agreement for jointly managing and protecting Lake Geneva. Starting in 1986, the two countries committed themselves to a series of five-year plans. This led to the establishment of the Commission internationale pour la protection des eaux du Léman (CIPEL), the current joint commission, and policies that allow fishermen from either country to fish anywhere on the lake. (Note: "1980: Ein neues Abkommen zwischen der Schweiz und Frankreich wird unterzeichnet. Es tritt 1982 in Kraft, nachdem es vom französischen Parlament ratifiziert worden ist. Die Hobbyfischer haben das Recht auf dem ganzen See zu fischen, die Berufsfischer dagegen müssen sich an die Landesgrenzen halten. Seit 1986: In Anlehnung an das Abkommen von 1980 wird die Fischerei in gemeinsamer Absprache geregelt (durch 5-Jahrespläne). 1998: Die internationale Kommission genehmigt das erste gemeinsame französisch-schweizerische Reglement, welches die Ausübung der Fischerei im Detail festlegt. Dieses Reglement soll im Jahre 2001 in Kraft treten, ebenso wie eine Änderung des internationalen Abkommens, welche den Berufsfischern unabhängig von ihrer Nationalität das Fischen in einer gemeinsamen Zone erlaubt.)

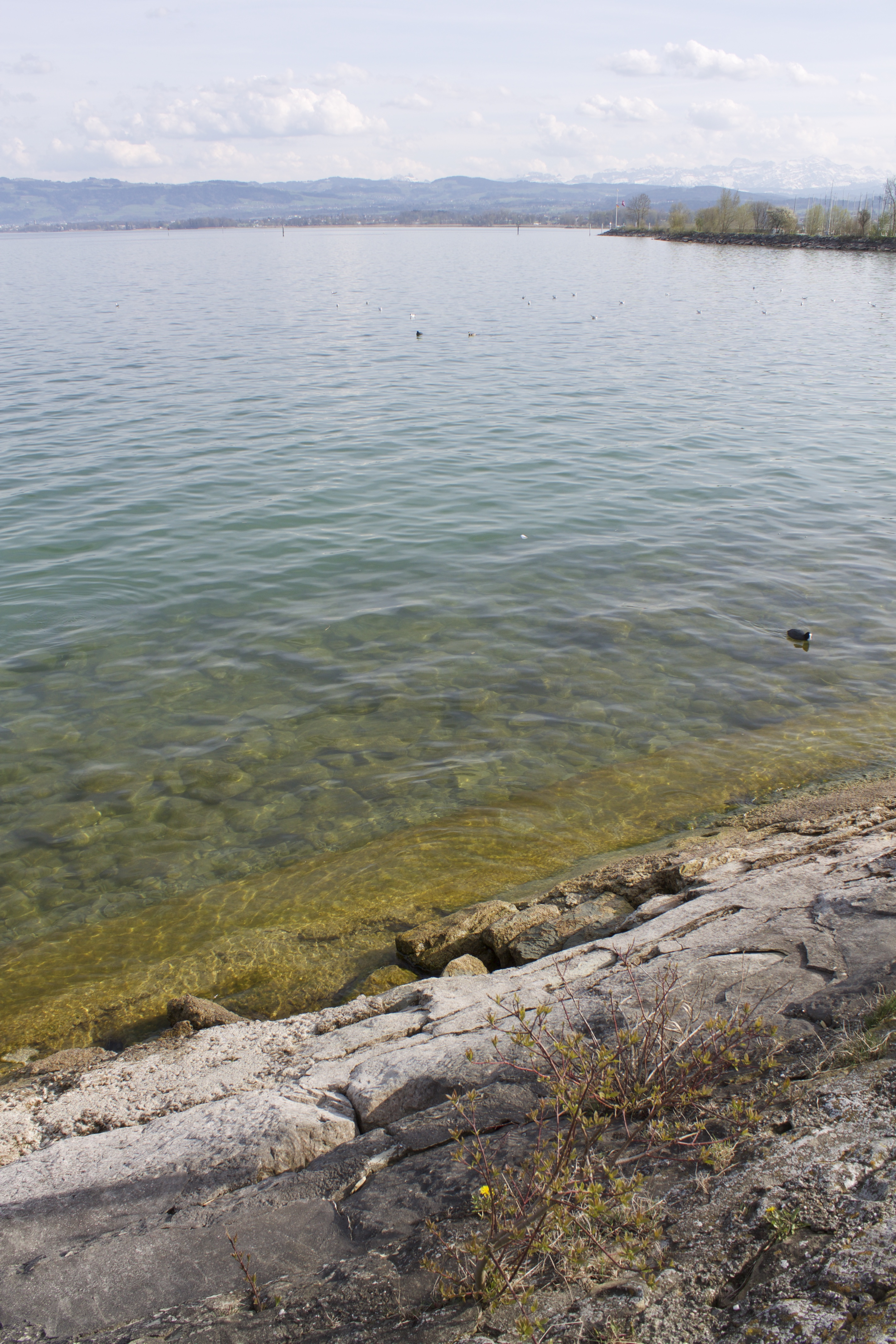
The reclarified waters of Lake Constance, in 2015, at Romanshorn

Beginning in 1985, phosphate levels in the lakes began declining. (Note: By 2013 Lake Constance's waters had a phosphate level of 7 mg/L, down considerably from the 86 mg/L recorded almost 40 years earlier. Phosphates in Lake Geneva similarly fell from 90 mg/L in 1976 to 20 mg/L in 2015.) At first this had a beneficial effect on fishing. Throughout the decade professional fishermen collectively recorded some of their highest average catches, around 3,000 t (3,000 long tons; 3,300 short tons) a year on lakes larger than 10 km^{2} (3.9 sq mi) in surface area. (Note: "Von 1980 bis 1989 erreichte der Ertrag in den Seen, die grösser als 10 km2 waren, im Mittel rund 3000 t für die Berufsfischer")

In 1991 the FFL was revised again. This update, the most recent as of 2021, added provisions for the biodiversity of the lakes and extended prioritized protections to all species native to them, not just those most economically valuable. (Note: "... während das vierte [Bundesgesetz] von 1991 die Erhaltung und Wiederherstellung der natürlichen Artenvielfalt der einheimischen Fische, Krebse und Fischnährtiere unabhängig von deren wirtschaftlichen Stellenwert in den Vordergrund rückte.) In 1992 the average annual commercial catch peaked at 3,400 t (3,300 long tons; 3,700 short tons) per lake.

Later in the decade, the paucity of phosphates promoted reoligotrophication of the lakes. Algal blooms began declining, and lake waters became clearer and colder. Catches began to decline, even as 50 million stocked fish were released into the lakes in 1996, (Note: "1996 wurden insgesamt 25 Mio. Brütlinge und 25 Mio. mehrmonatige Fischchen ausgesetzt.") because the algae had served to nourish the phytoplankton which fed the smaller species eaten in turn by perch, whitefish and other species favored by Swiss diners.

=== 21st century: Decline in fishermen and other challenges ===
By 2001 the total catch had fallen to around 1,700 t (1,700 long tons; 1,900 short tons), half of what it had been less than a decade before. Fishermen were on average making two-thirds of what they had been during the 1980s. In addition to the low phosphate counts in the water, they and their organizations also faulted the cantons for not meeting their legal obligations, and the effects of increased use of hydroelectric power, since it interfered with fish's ability to spawn in some streams. A mid-2000s "living water" initiative sponsored by the SFA was meant to counter that by, among other things, amending the federal constitution to allow fishing and environmental groups an increased right of appeal on government decisions in those areas; it was not supported by other groups with similar interests.

Another government environmental effort has given Swiss fishermen cause for concern. Following Japan's Fukushima nuclear accident in 2011, renewed anti-nuclear protests swept across the country, and the government soon responded by announcing that while it would continue using the five reactors it then had online, it would not replace them as they reached the end of their usability, with the goal of phasing out nuclear power completely by 2034. Voters endorsed this plan in a 2017 referendum.

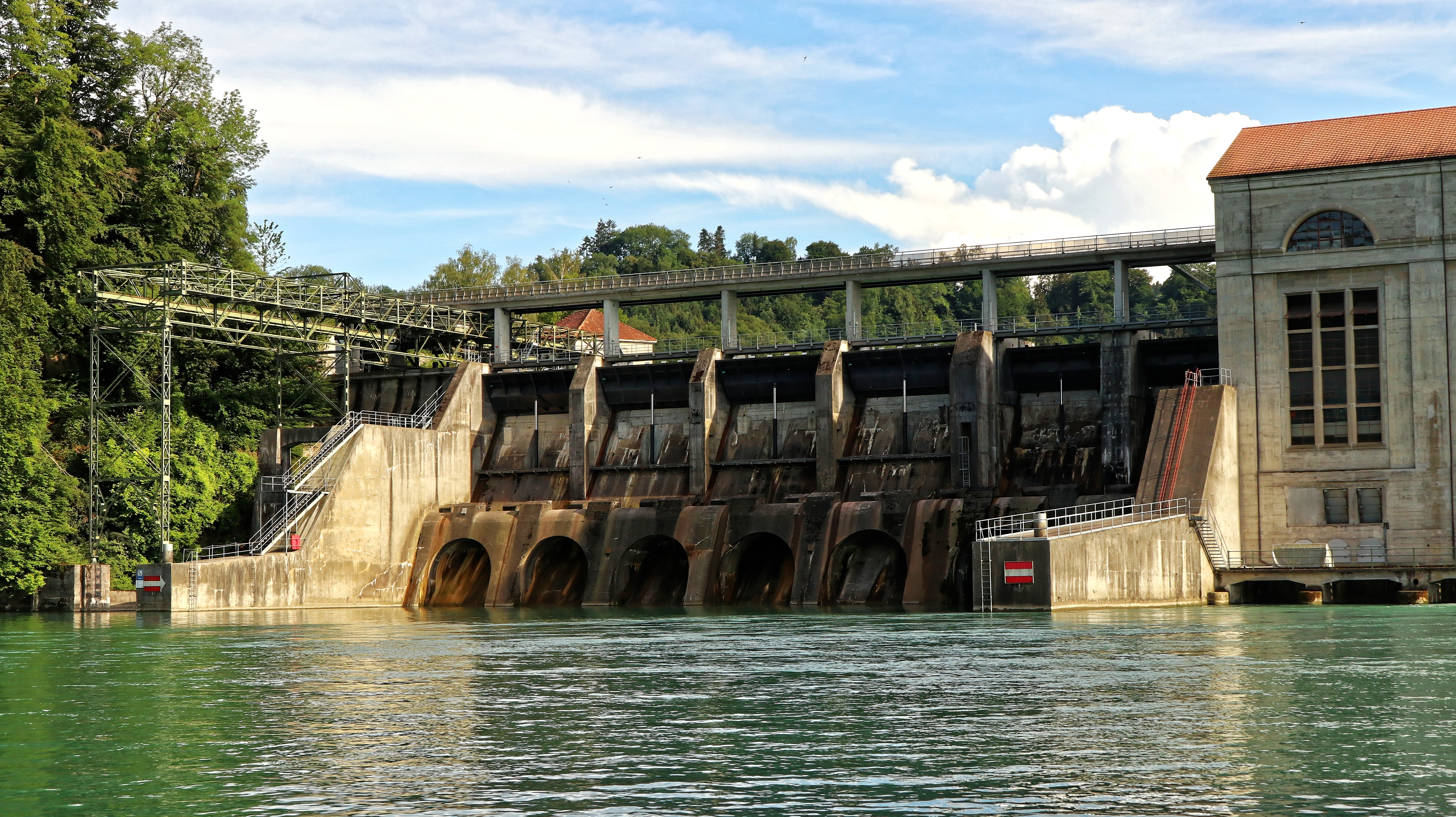
The Mühleberg hydroelectric plant on the Aare in Bern

To replace the reactors, which in the 2000s accounted for slightly more than a third of Switzerland's generating capacity, while addressing climate change, the government intends to rely more on renewable energy, particularly hydroelectric. As part of the nuclear phase-out, capacity for that energy is to be increased 6 percent by 2035. The law requires those plants to reduce their negative environmental impact by 2030, but fishermen still fear their effects, noting that the hydro plants, already on most of the country's waterways, serve as obstacles or outright barriers to fish swimming to upstream spawning grounds. In the canton of Bern, for instance, dams prevent fish from traveling to the upper reaches of the Aare.

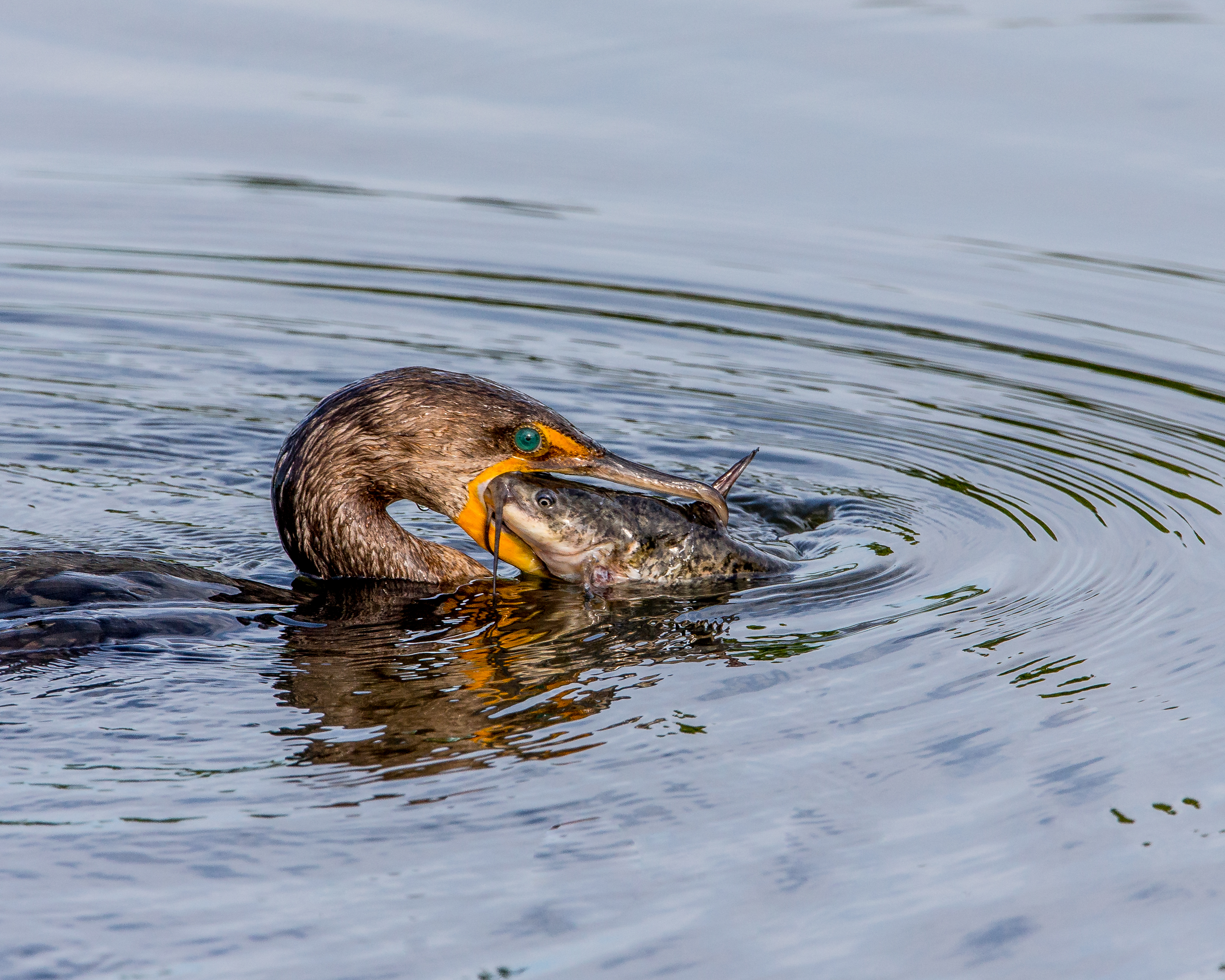
A cormorant eating a fish

With the cleaner waters, cormorants, not seen since the Middle Ages, began returning to Swiss lakes in the 2000s. By 2015, a thousand nesting couples had been counted, mostly in lakeside sanctuaries, with five to six times that number joining them for the winter months. Since each adult bird consumes on average 500 g (1.1 lb) of fish a day, fishermen see them as unwelcome competitors. The cormorants also damage nets and traps beyond the point of repair in order to take their fish, which further hinders fishing. As the birds are strictly protected, fishermen on Lake Neuchâtel have staged protests on the water, suggesting that without action to allow them to protect their catch they might take measures of their own. In 2008 it was estimated that cormorant predation cost fishermen on the lake CHF 210,000 a year; (Note: Research by Lithuanian scientists in the Curonian Lagoon suggests that cormorants do not compete with commercial fishermen as much as they are believed to, due to the limited range of fish preferred by the cormorants and other bird species that prey on them. Italian researchers also found that cormorants on Lake Como and smaller lakes nearby concentrated on species not in great commercial demand.) the authorities closed off access to part of the shoreline and removed the nests left by the bird couples from previous seasons on the lake islands popular with them.

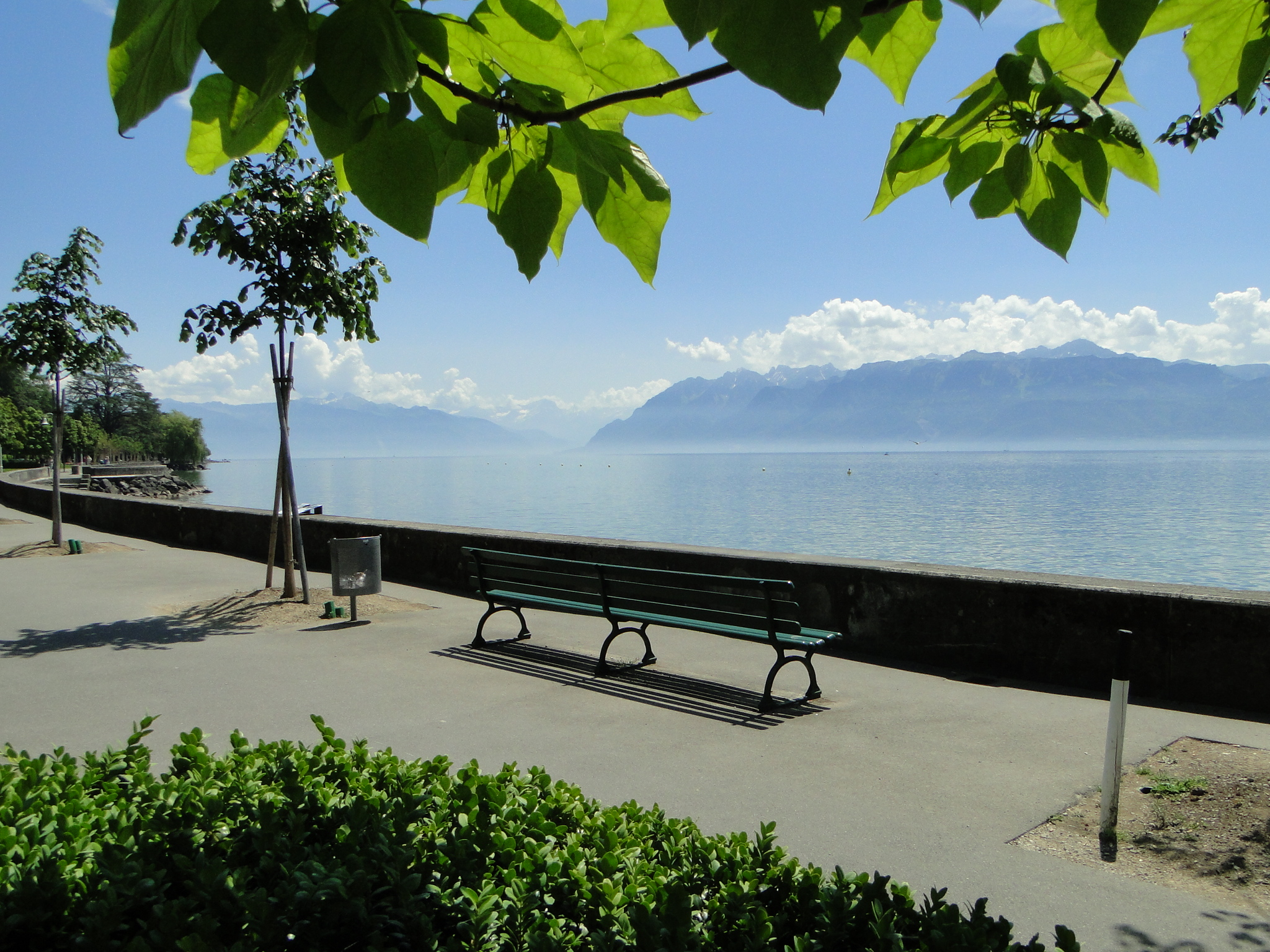
Developed shoreline of Lake Geneva in Lausanne

Fishermen on Lake Geneva point out that there, at least, the birds are not entirely to blame for declining catches. According to CIPEL, only three percent of the lake's shoreline is in its original natural state of coastal marsh, where fish can breed with less fear of bird attacks. More than 60 percent of the lake's 200 km (120 mi) of shoreline has become completely artificial, in the form of retaining walls or riprap. Swiss law currently requires the cantons to take actions to restore all watercourses and waterbodies to as close to their natural state as possible by the end of the century; the federal government has set aside CHF 40 million in its budget each year to help them reach this goal.

As catches have declined in the first two decades of the 21st century, so too have the fishermen themselves making them. By 2015 there were 284 professional fishermen left in Switzerland, a third as many as there were in 1970, with only 181 of them doing it full-time; in 2009 one of the six fishermen still plying the waters of Lake Thun recalled that earlier in his 30-year career there had been 40 of them. Some of this decline is due to government policy of letting licenses expire once the fishermen who hold them retire, instead of granting them to another entrant, in order to prevent overfishing. (Note: "Einerseits reduzierten die Kantone die Zahl der Netzpatente (1948 zählte man 1132, 2008 nur noch 323 Netzfischer) ... Die verbesserte technische Ausrüstung der Fischer, namentlich der Übergang von gezwirnten Baumwollnetzen zu immer feineren und fängigeren monofilen Kunststoffnetzen, liess eine neuerliche Überfischung befürchten. Durch eine weitere Senkung der Patentzahl wurde dies verhindert.") But fishermen say that the profession has gotten so unprofitable due to the pressure on the fish populations that many younger fishermen have to work other jobs to maintain an income. In 2018, the average age of the eight fishermen in the canton of St. Gallen who fished Lake Constance was 60.

== Fisheries ==
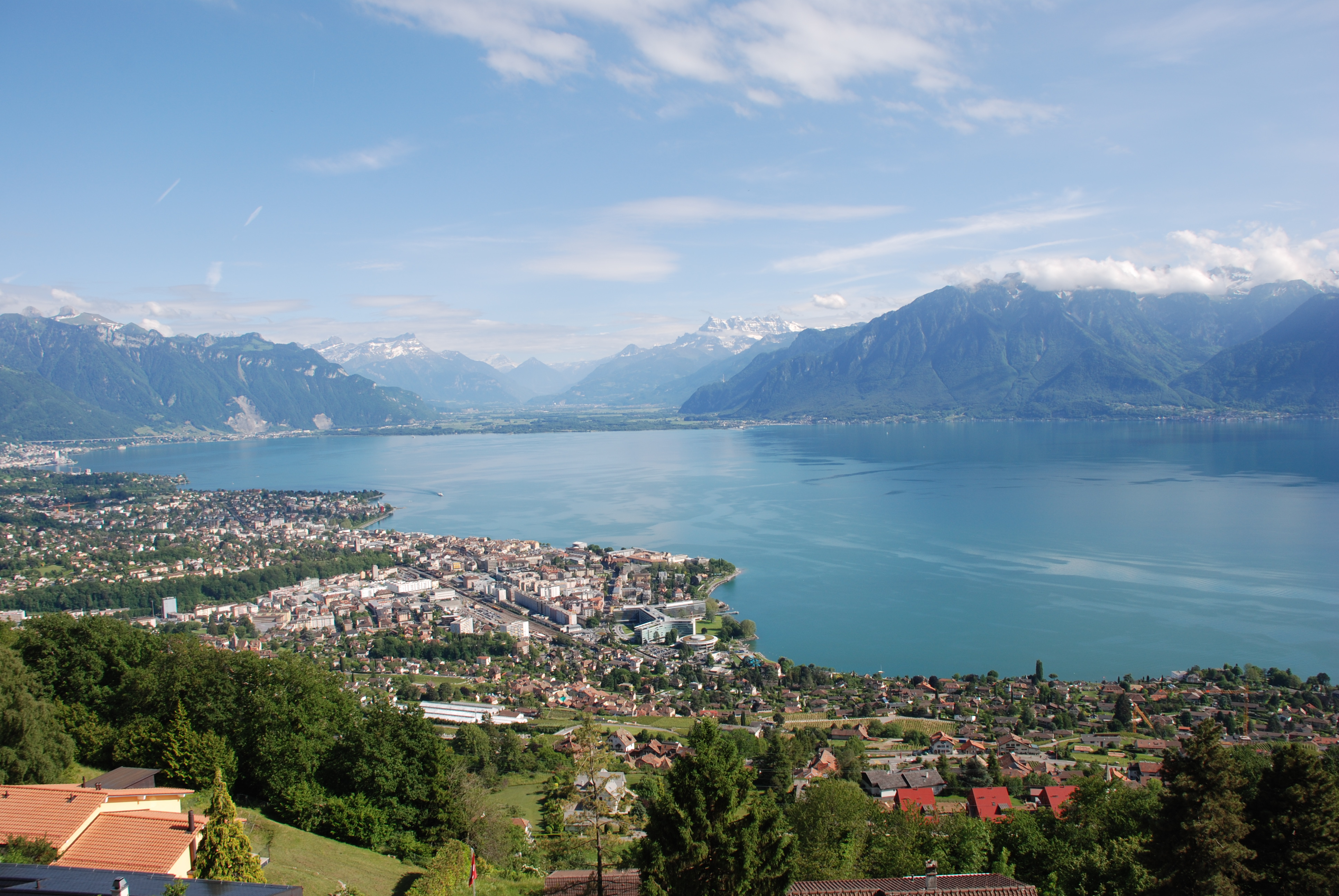
Lake Geneva

Switzerland has 1,342 square kilometres (518 sq mi) of lake surface area, 1,232.3 square kilometres (475.8 sq mi), or 91 percent of the total, of which is used for commercial fishing. This includes 16 of the country's 17 largest lakes, all those more than 10 square kilometres (3.9 sq mi) in area except the Sihlsee reservoir in the canton of Schwyz. Lake Geneva is the largest, and 10.2-square-kilometre (3.9 sq mi) Lake Hallwil in the cantons of Aargau and Lucerne the smallest to support a commercial fishery. (Note: The area given by the FSO for lakes shared with neighboring countries is for the Swiss portion only.)

Lake Geneva is also the country's largest fishery, producing almost 300 tonnes (300 long tons; 330 short tons) in 2018, about a quarter of the total national catch of 1,171.6 tonnes (1,291.5 short tons; 1,153.1 long tons) that year, the most recent as of 2021 for which reliable statistics are available. (Note: Early figures for 2019 and 2020 show that number dropping to 1,100 tonnes (1,200 short tons; 1,100 long tons) and 1,050 tonnes (1,160 short tons; 1,030 long tons) respectively.) Lake Zurich comes in second at 200 tonnes (200 long tons; 220 short tons), and Lake Neuchâtel third with 162 tonnes (159 long tons; 179 short tons). Six lakes—Geneva, Constance, Neuchâtel, Zurich, Lucerne and Biel—account for 932 tonnes (1,027 short tons; 917 long tons), or almost 80 percent of the total. Measured by productivity, small Lake Sempach is first, with its fishermen taking in 5.56 kg of fish (predominantly whitefish) per hectare (ha) of surface area, with Lake Zurich second at 2.28 kg/ha. Lake Constance is the least productive, with 76 g/ha coming from its waters.

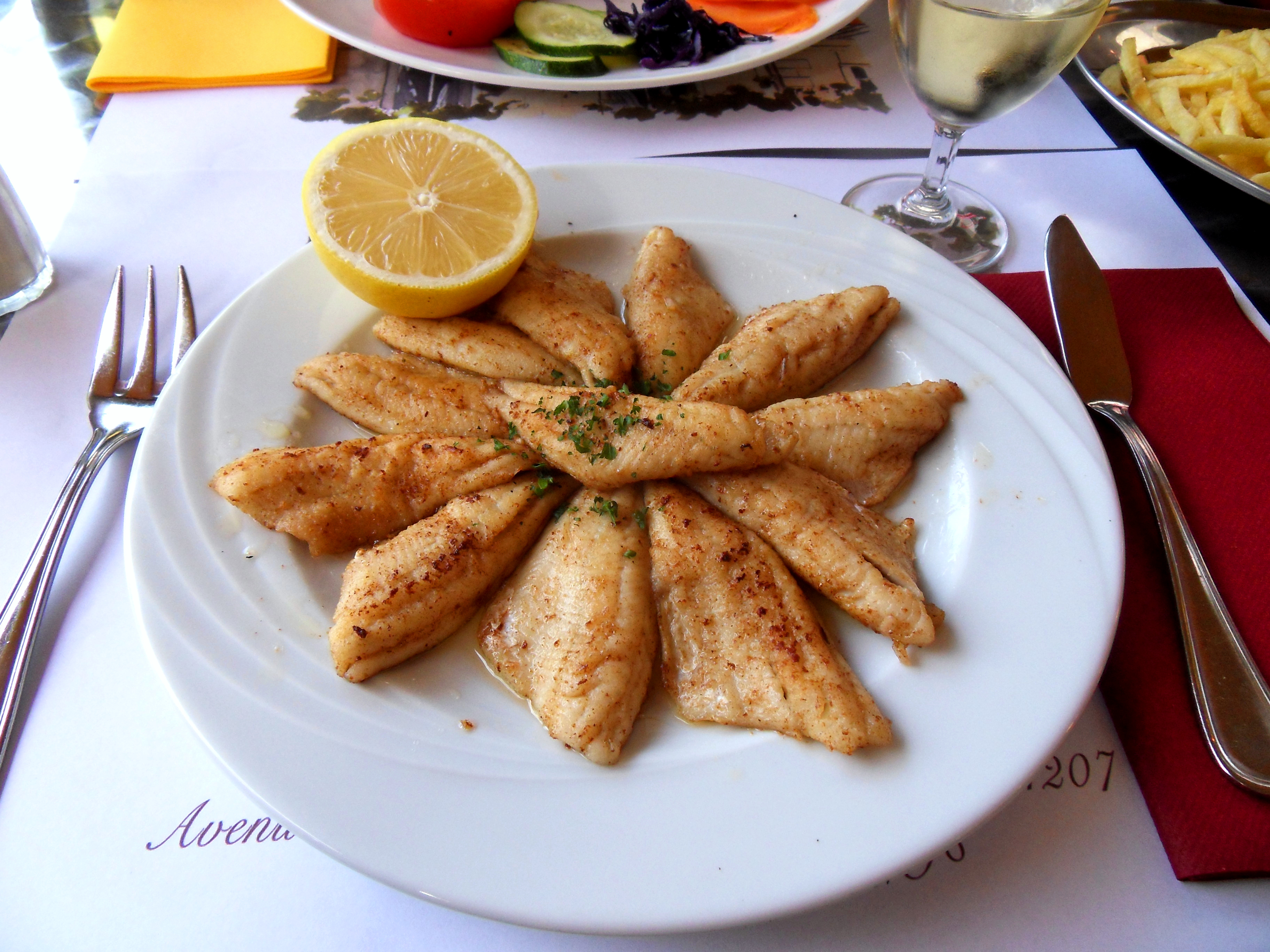
Indigenous fishes, such as perch, are often served in lakeshore restaurants

Half of the catch (584 tonnes (644 short tons; 575 long tons)) is whitefish. The greatest share of that species, at 107 tonnes (118 short tons; 105 long tons), comes from Lake Zurich, with Neuchâtel and Geneva second and third respectively at 96 tonnes (106 short tons; 94 long tons) and 89 tonnes (98 short tons; 88 long tons). The 314 tonnes (346 short tons; 309 long tons) of perch makes it the second most commonly caught species, accounting for nearly 27 percent of the total. Almost half of the perch, 151 tonnes (166 short tons; 149 long tons), is taken from Lake Geneva, with the 41 tonnes (45 short tons; 40 long tons) from Lake Neuchâtel making it a distant second.

Roach are the third most commonly caught fish in Swiss lakes, at 99 tonnes (109 short tons; 97 long tons), over a third of them taken from Lake Zurich. The 66 tonnes (73 short tons; 65 long tons) of pike, 20 tonnes (22 short tons; 20 long tons) of which come from Lake Geneva, make it fourth. Some less common species are concentrated in particular lakes, like bream in Lake Zurich and agone in Lake Maggiore. Since Swiss consumers generally dislike roach and bream, those species are considered bycatch.

Shellfishes, such as crayfish, are also found in the Swiss lakes. Their consumption is, however, very rare.

=== Fishermen and fleet ===
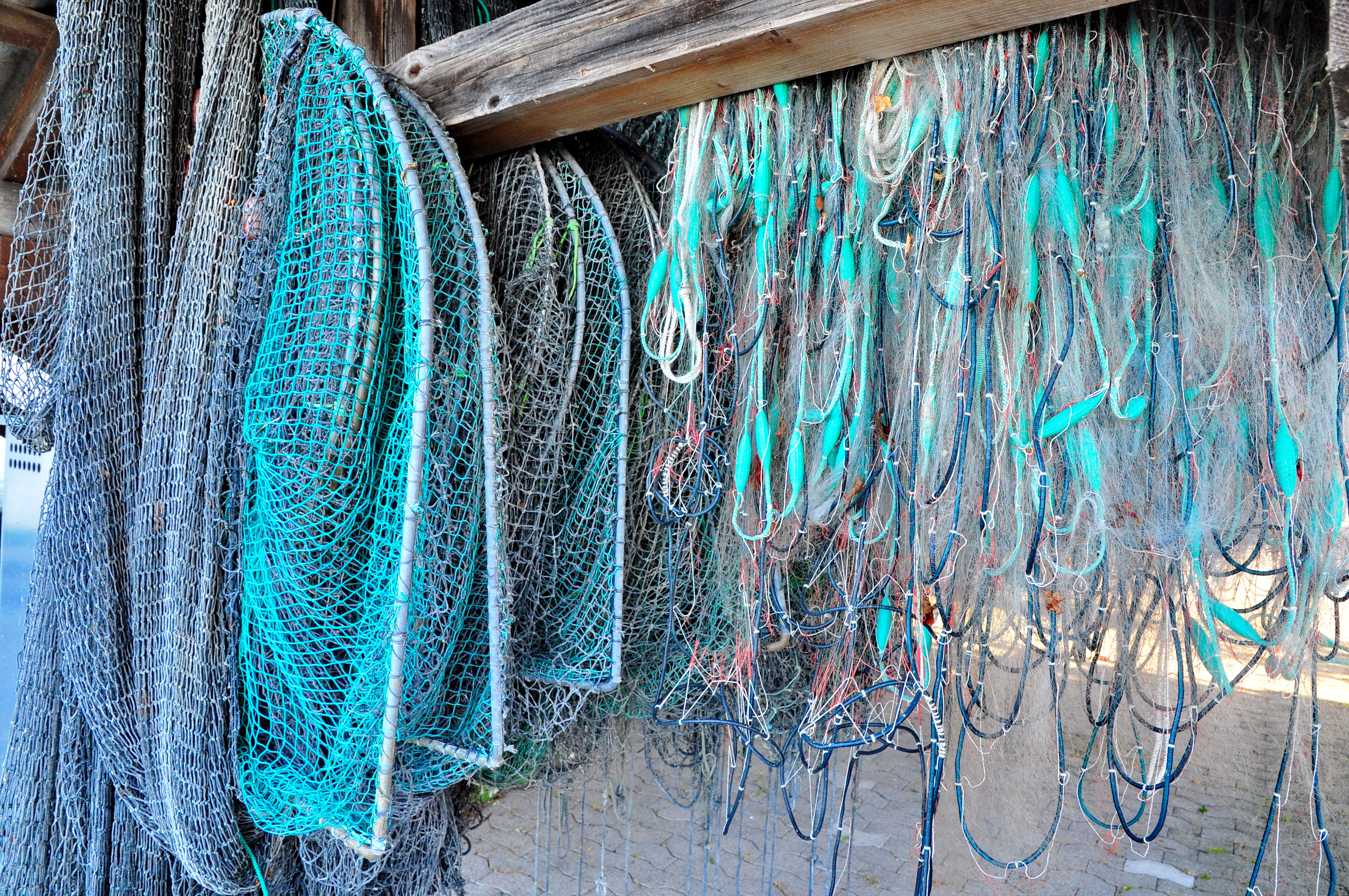
Fishing nets hanging in Hurden

In 2016, Switzerland's Federal Office for the Environment reported that the country had that year issued 270 licenses to 263 fishermen. Of those, 163, or 62 percent, were Category 1 licenses issued to those who derived no less than 90 percent of their income from fishing. Category 2 licenses, issued to those for whom fishing accounted for 30–90 percent of their income, went to 58, or 22 percent. In the lowest level, Category 3, for fishermen making less than 30 percent, were 49, or 19 percent. (Note: "En 2016, 270 permis de pêche professionnelle ont été octroyés à 262 personnes (dont huit étaient titulaires de deux permis), réparties en trois catégories selon leur taux d'occupation: 163 personnes exerçaient la pêche à titre d'activité professionnelle unique (Catégorie 1: au minimum 90% de moyens d'existence ou du temps de travail), 58 à titre d'activité professionnelle principale (Cat.2: 30% jusqu'à 90% de moyens d'existence ou du temps de travail) et 49 à titre d'activité professionnelle annexe (Cat.3: moins de 30% de moyens d'existence ou du temps de travail).")

A majority of fishermen in 2016 were between the ages of 45 and 75, accounting for over 150. The smallest age bracket were a few under 26; there were also about 10 over the age of 86. Younger fishermen were more likely to hold Category 1 licenses, while conversely the older fishermen held fewer. Women held 18 licenses, roughly 7 percent of the total.

Swiss fishermen ply the lakes in small, open boats with outboard motors and space for nets, traps and coolers in the back. They rarely have more than one other person working in the boat. No purpose-built fishing vessels such as trawlers like those used by marine fishermen in other countries are in use.

== Angling ==
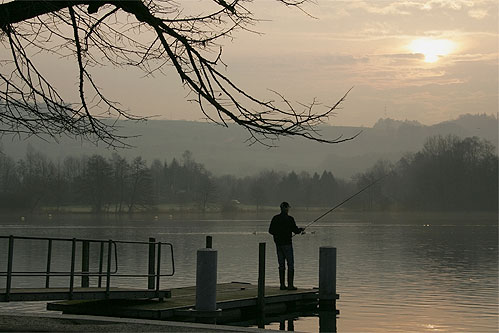
Angler on Lake Sempach on an early spring morning

Fishing for personal consumption, with a rod from the shore rather than a net from a boat, was provided for under medieval law. Until the mid-19th century most anglers fished for food and some additional income; only with industrialization did angling become primarily a recreational activity, first in the rivers, then the lakes. A century later there were 80,000 licensed or otherwise known sport fishermen; by 2008 the number had reached 100,000 (Note: "Das Freiangelrecht umfasste das Recht jeden Bürgers, vom Ufer aus mit der Angel oder einem Schiebenetz für den Eigengebrauch zu fischen ... Im 19. Jahrhundert wurde die Angelfischerei vorwiegend von einfachen Leuten betrieben, die möglichst viele Fische fangen wollten, um damit Nebeneinnahmen zu erzielen. Erst mit der Industrialisierung wurde die Angelfischerei nach und nach zur Freizeitbeschäftigung ohne Gewinnstreben, die als Ausgleich etwa zur eintönigen Fabrikarbeit betrieben wurde. Die Zahl der Angelfischer nahm zuerst in den Flüssen, dann auch in den Seen stark zu. 1948 zählte man bereits 80'000 Angler, 2008 gemäss Bundesamt für Umwelt rund 100'000 (Patentinhaber, Pächter oder Mitglieder von Pachtvereinen, Freiangler).)

Today recreational fishing under cantonal license is popular in Switzerland, both with the Swiss themselves and visitors from abroad, many attracted to the challenges and rewards of fly fishing in the mountain streams. It is estimated as of 2008 that 275,000 people total fish the country's streams and lakes recreationally every year, generating CHF 46.6 million in annual revenue on tackle.

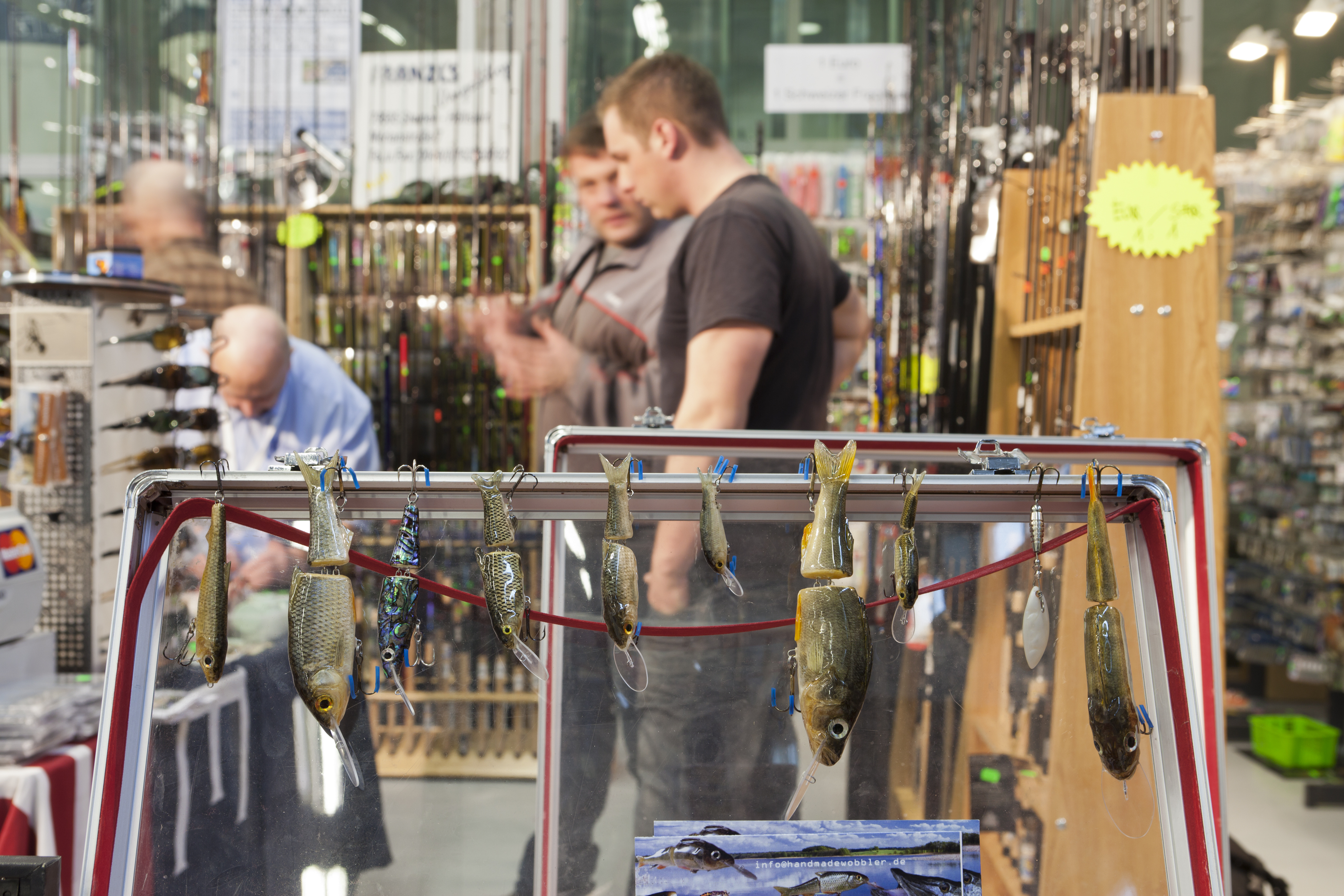
Fishing lures for sale at 2012 Swiss outdoor-sports show

Swiss government statistics for 2018 show that anglers took 458 tonnes (505 short tons; 451 long tons) of fish that year, 253 tonnes (279 short tons; 249 long tons) of that from the country's lakes. Unlike the country's professional fishermen that year, perch, at 92 tonnes (101 short tons; 91 long tons), made up the greatest share, with pike the next most common at 66 tonnes (73 short tons; 65 long tons) taken by anglers, approximately equivalent to the professional fisherman's catch. The 44 tonnes (49 short tons; 43 long tons) put them in third. Anglers take three times as many lake trout.

As with professional fishing, lakes Geneva and Zurich rank first and second in accounting for the greatest shares of the recreational catch, with 54 and 49 tonnes (60 and 54 short tons; 53 and 48 long tons) respectively. But it is Lake Biel, rather than Constance, that takes third place, at 26 tonnes (29 short tons; 26 long tons) to the larger lake's 21 tonnes (23 short tons; 21 long tons). Anglers' take from Lake Brienz slightly exceeds the commercial catch.

Anglers have sometimes come into conflict with the country's professional fishermen. In 2016 the former complained that regulations on their activities on Lake Constance scheduled to come into effect at the beginning of the following year were not only unduly burdensome to them but detrimental to the lake's already stressed fishery. They included a limit of 12 whitefish and 30 perch per angler per day, and an absolute ban on returning any undersized fish to the lake, which they considered unfair given that their license fees went to subsidizing commercial fishing on the lake (they themselves are, unlike anglers in some other European countries, not allowed to sell any of their catch), and that when the lake is closed to anglers during December the professional fishermen take most of its whitefish to meet holiday demand for caviar. Anglers were also opposed to proposals by the professional fishermen to release more phosphates into the lake to increase fish stocks. (Note: "Den Sportfischern geht es vor allem um die neuen Beschlüsse, die am 1. Januar in Kraft treten. Jeder Sportfischer darf dann nur noch 12 Felchen und 30 Egli pro Tag fangen. Ausserdem darf er kleine Fische nicht mehr zurück in den See setzen. «So müssen wir mit dem Fischen aufhören», sagt Sanfilippo. Das sei unfair, da die Berufsfischer keine Kontingente hätten. «Auch wir zahlen Patente und finanzieren so zum grössten Teil die Fischerei mit.» ... e Nahrung ist ein weiterer grosser Streitpunkt zwischen Berufsfischern und Sportfischern. Die Berufsfischer wollen den Phosphatgehalt im Bodensee erhöhen. «Es gibt klare Hinweise darauf, dass ein Zusammenhang zwischen der Phosphatmenge und der Fisch-Biomasse im See besteht», sagt Kistler. Falle der Phosphatwert unter zehn Mikrogramm pro Liter, gehe der Fischbestand in vielen Seen zurück. Heute liege der Wert im Bodensee etwa bei sechs Mikrogramm pro Liter. «Eine aktive Beeinflussung des Phosphatgehalts, so wie sich dies die Berufsfischer wünschen, ist jedoch mit vielen Unsicherheiten und Risiken verbunden, über deren Auswirkungen die Fachleute ganz unterschiedliche Ansichten vertreten», führt Kistler aus.)

A spokesman for the Swiss Professional Fisheries Association responded that the 12 whitefish constituted 3 kilograms (6.6 lb) of fish and said that recreational fishermen should be focused on enjoying themselves and nature, not how many fish they catch. He defended the need to increase the lake's phosphate counts, noting that in the wake of heavy flooding of the Upper Rhine the year before professional fishermen on Constance had seen an increase in their catch, the fishes' stomachs filled with phytoplankton. A spokesman for the anglers responded that that was due to an increase in mosquito larvae in the lake's shallows after the flood. Both groups expressed an interest in working together to resolve these differences. (Note: "«Zwölf Felchen sind drei Kilo Fisch. Hobbyfischer dürfen diese nicht verkaufen. Was wollen sie also damit? Für Hobbyfischer sollte die Freude an der Natur und am Sport im Vordergrund stehen und nicht die Menge an gefangenem Fisch», sagt Leuch ... Die Argumentation der Berufsfischer mit den fetteren Fischen nach einem Hochwasser stimme nicht. Die Fische seien beim Hochwasser nicht von Phosphat genährt worden, sondern von Mückenlarven, welche sie in der überschwemmten Ufergegend gefunden hätten.")

=== Catch and release restrictions ===
In 2008, as part of a larger animal welfare bill, the Swiss Federal Assembly limited catch and release fishing; the law took effect the following year. It is often represented as an outright ban; in fact, anglers are allowed to release fish they catch as long as they:

- do not go fishing with the express intention of releasing any fish they catch,
- are reasonably certain that the fish will survive,
- handle the fish respectfully,
- take personal responsibility for the consequences of releasing the fish,
- release the fish as soon as possible after catching it, and
- do so for what they believe to be good environmental reasons.

Fish may not be released at all if they are of a species not native to Swiss waters, such as rainbow trout, or are within legal size for their species and are in a habitat where cantonal regulations declare their natural reproduction to be impossible and are therefore stocked (such as most of the country's mountain lakes). (Note: A Swiss fishing guide has posted on his blog an English-language summary of the provisions of this regulation based on the German version of the document.) No fishable waters anywhere in the country may be posted as "no kill" or "catch and release". (Note: "En Suisse, il n'existe aucun lieu de pêche avec remise obligatoire à l'eau de posissons capturés")

Fish not released and thus taken as food must be killed immediately by a blow to the head or neck, after which its gills must be cut or the fish eviscerated, if they are 22 centimetres (8.7 in) or more long. Cantons may provide for additional methods if they are humane. Anglers whose license terms are a month or more in length are required to take a two-day class in angling knowledge, including these methods of killing fish. The law also bans the use of barbed hooks and live bait except for limited circumstances.

The year after the regulations came into effect, anglers' total take, which had previously well exceeded 500 tonnes (550 short tons; 490 long tons) a year, dropped well below that. It would not reach previous levels until 2015, and since then has returned to 450-tonne (500-short-ton; 440-long-ton) range.

== Fish farming ==
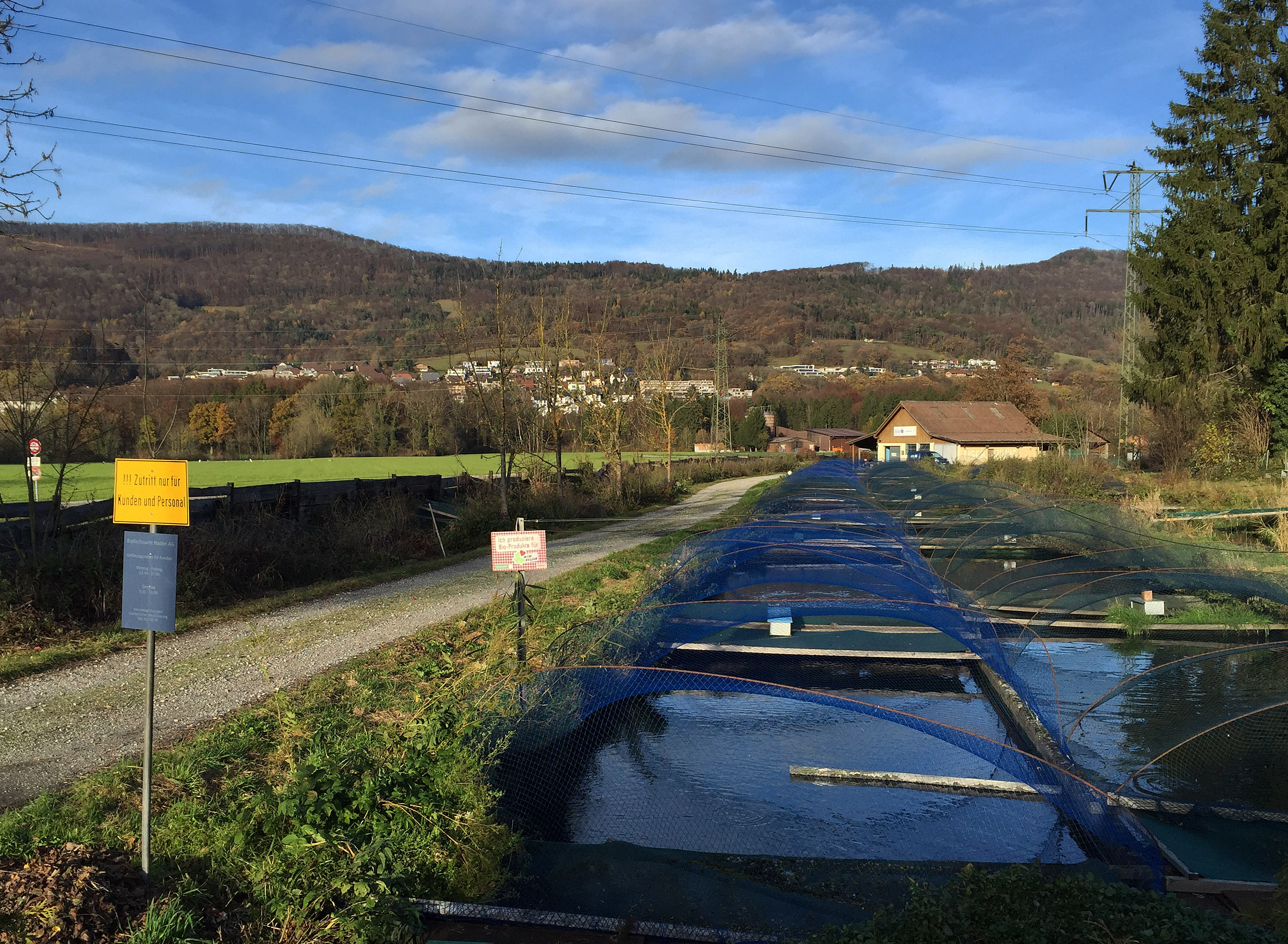
Fish farm outside Rohr, Aargau

Fish farming, or pisciculture, has been recorded in Switzerland since antiquity. Monasteries kept vivaria, small fish ponds, to ensure a regular supply for their own needs. These were expanded in the 1400s when specialists in their management emerged. The specialist combined fattened fish in ponds with feed fish, taking them out once they had reached salable size. By 1742, according to the regulations of the Abbey of Saint Gall, the system had reached three separate ponds for its carp: one for spawning, a "stretch pond" in which the fry thus spawned grew, and a settling pond where they were fattened until consumption. (Note: "Seit der Antike sind Fischweiher (Vivarien) bekannt. Vor allem in Klöstern wurden sie zur Frischhaltung der Fische gebraucht. Im 15. Jahrhundert wurden mit Hilfe spezialisierter Teichgräber, den Friesen, eine grosse Zahl Fischteiche neu angelegt, in welche Mastfische zusammen mit Futterfischen eingesetzt und bis zur marktfähigen Grösse gehalten wurden. Eine entwickeltere, dreiteilige Teichwirtschaft wird in der Fisch- und Karpfen-Ordnung der Fürstabtei St. Gallen 1742 beschrieben: Der Mutterweiher diente für das Ablaichen, im Streckweiher konnten die Jungtiere sich entwickeln und im Setzweiher wurden die Karpfen bis zum Verzehr gemästet.")

A small commercial pisciculture industry developed during the 20th century, concentrating on raising rainbow and brook trout, all for the domestic market. In 1974, a combined 300 tonnes (330 short tons; 300 long tons) of both species were produced by 30 farmers; this accounted for 23 percent of domestic consumption, with the rest taken up by farmed trout imported from Denmark, France and Italy. A few farmers, in the western portion of the country, raised carp, which despite its historical cultivation is a difficult species to farm in Switzerland due to its preference for water temperatures that cannot be easily maintained in the earthen ponds used. The 2 tonnes (2.2 short tons; 2.0 long tons) so produced in 1975 was consumed entirely domestically, often sold directly to homemakers who prepared them for their families.

Swiss pisciculture production was then growing at an annual rate of 10 percent. By the early 1980s annual production had reached around 250 tonnes (280 short tons; 250 long tons). Later in the decade it rose sharply, to more than four times that level. It remained there, in the range of 1,000–1,100 tonnes (1,100–1,200 short tons; 980–1,080 long tons) a year, as professional capture fishing's still-greater take began to decline in the 2000s. In the late 2010s pisciculture production began to increase sharply, and in 2016 for the first time Switzerland's fish farms outproduced its fishing boats.

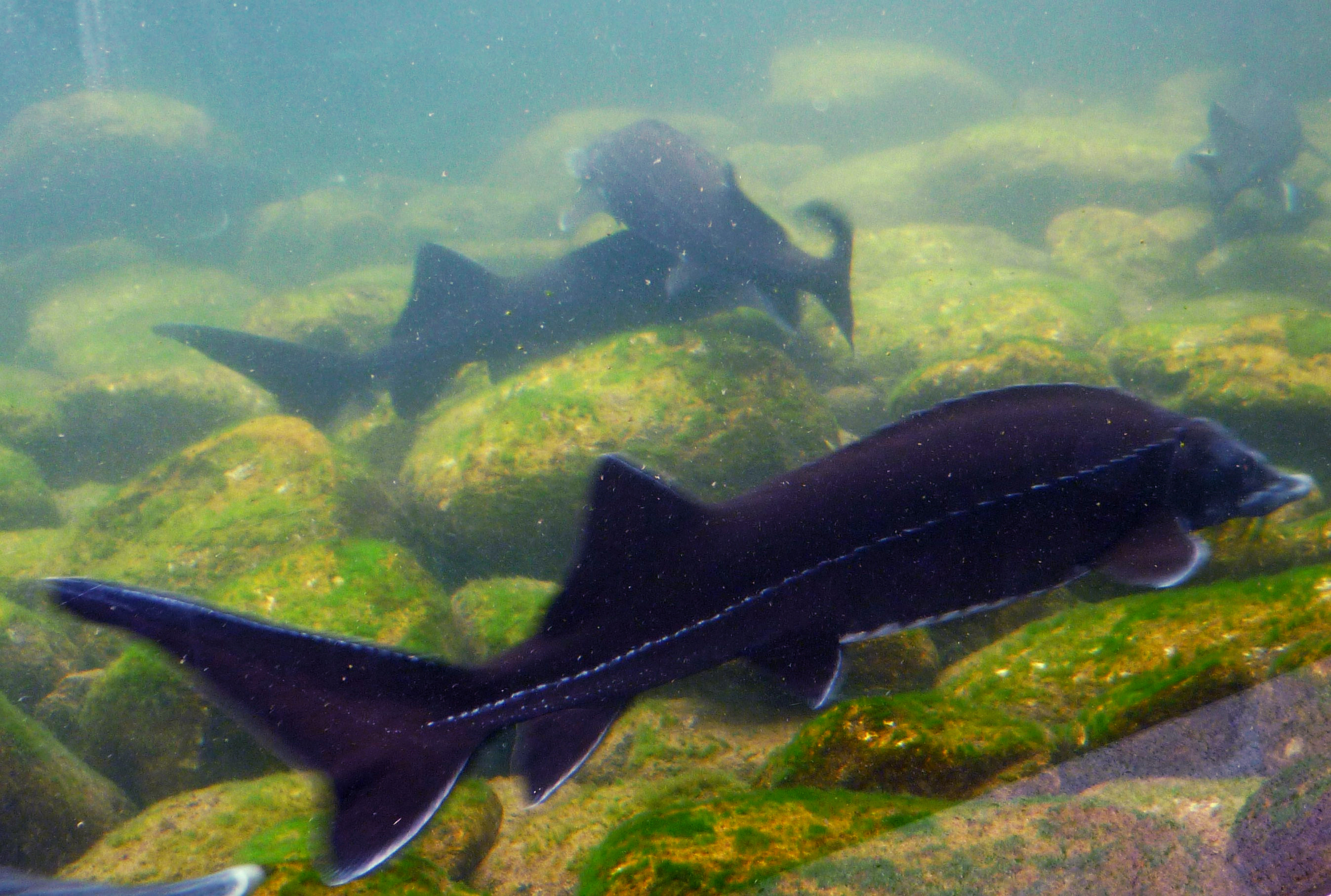
Sturgeon farm in Frutigen

In 2020 pisciculture accounted for 2,200 tonnes (2,400 short tons; 2,200 long tons) of the country's total 3,715 tonnes (4,095 short tons; 3,656 long tons), in contrast to 1,050 tonnes (1,160 short tons; 1,030 long tons) taken by the professional fishermen. Statistics breaking down the farms' output by species for 2015 show that rainbow trout accounts for 82 percent of their output. Perch, at 10 percent, and tilapia at 4 percent, are the next most farmed species, with sea trout, sturgeon and char making up the balance at that time.

Fish farming in Switzerland has long been done in private pools or ponds isolated from the country's waterways and waterbodies. In 2020 a German cooperative proposed a whitefish farm using cages in Lake Constance as a way to boost that lake's declining catches. Swiss fishermen joined their German colleagues in vehement opposition to the project, staging a 100-boat flotilla on the lake one weekend as a protest. They were concerned about not only the pollution that might occur but the possible spread of disease from farmed fish to the wild population their livelihood depends on, no matter what assurances the cooperative made about being able to prevent that. While the IGKB, the tri-national commission that regulates the lake, already prohibits caged fish farming within the lake, the fishermen want the ban to be made statutory as well.

In the 2010s a new species has been added to Switzerland's pisciculture portfolio: Atlantic salmon. Swiss Lachs installed a recirculating aquaculture system at its Swiss Alpine Fish facility in the Graubünden village of Lostallo in 2015, where it had previously raised rainbow trout, and began raising salmon the following year from Icelandic eggs, (Note: Another Swiss company, Matorka AG, raises salmon and Arctic char at land-based facilities in Iceland.) in water drawn from the nearby Moesa River. Those first fish were brought to market in 2018. The company estimates it can produce up to 600 tonnes (660 short tons; 590 long tons) a year, most of which will be sold fresh, direct to domestic consumers; it hopes to soon expand capacity and triple that output. Other Swiss fish farmers are exploring the possibility of raising species not usually associated with the country, such as shrimp.

== Fish processing ==
Since most of the Swiss catch is eaten fresh, most processing is limited to preparing fish for sale, often just freezing it when necessary. Swiss Lachs, and some other farmers, have also opened artisanal smokehouses for their products; the former estimates it gives this treatment to about 20 percent of its output. Fish oil is also produced for pharmaceutical use.

== Management and regulations ==
Guiding principles for Swiss fisheries management are set by the FFL. The cantons enact specific statutory and regulatory provisions within those principles. Cantonal laws set, for instance, the fees and terms of various fishing licenses, transactions in fishing rights, and grant the government the power to regulate fishing activities for safety and environmental reasons.

Two general principles guide fisheries management across the country. The first is to favor natural reproduction, by allowing all fish the opportunity to spawn at least once before possibly being caught. This is achieved by minimum mesh sizes in the nets used by commercial fishermen, and minimum sizes for their recreational counterparts.

The second principle is an ambitious stocking program. The federal and cantonal governments both support these efforts financially, although only in western Switzerland is it carried out by the government, usually the cantons. In the east, while the cantons administer the programs, commercial fishermen, along with some recreational anglers, do the actual stocking. Perch is abundant enough that it does not have to be stocked.

== See also ==
- Fishing industry by country
- Merchant marine of Switzerland
- Agriculture in Switzerland
