= Dreierwalder Aa =

River in Germany

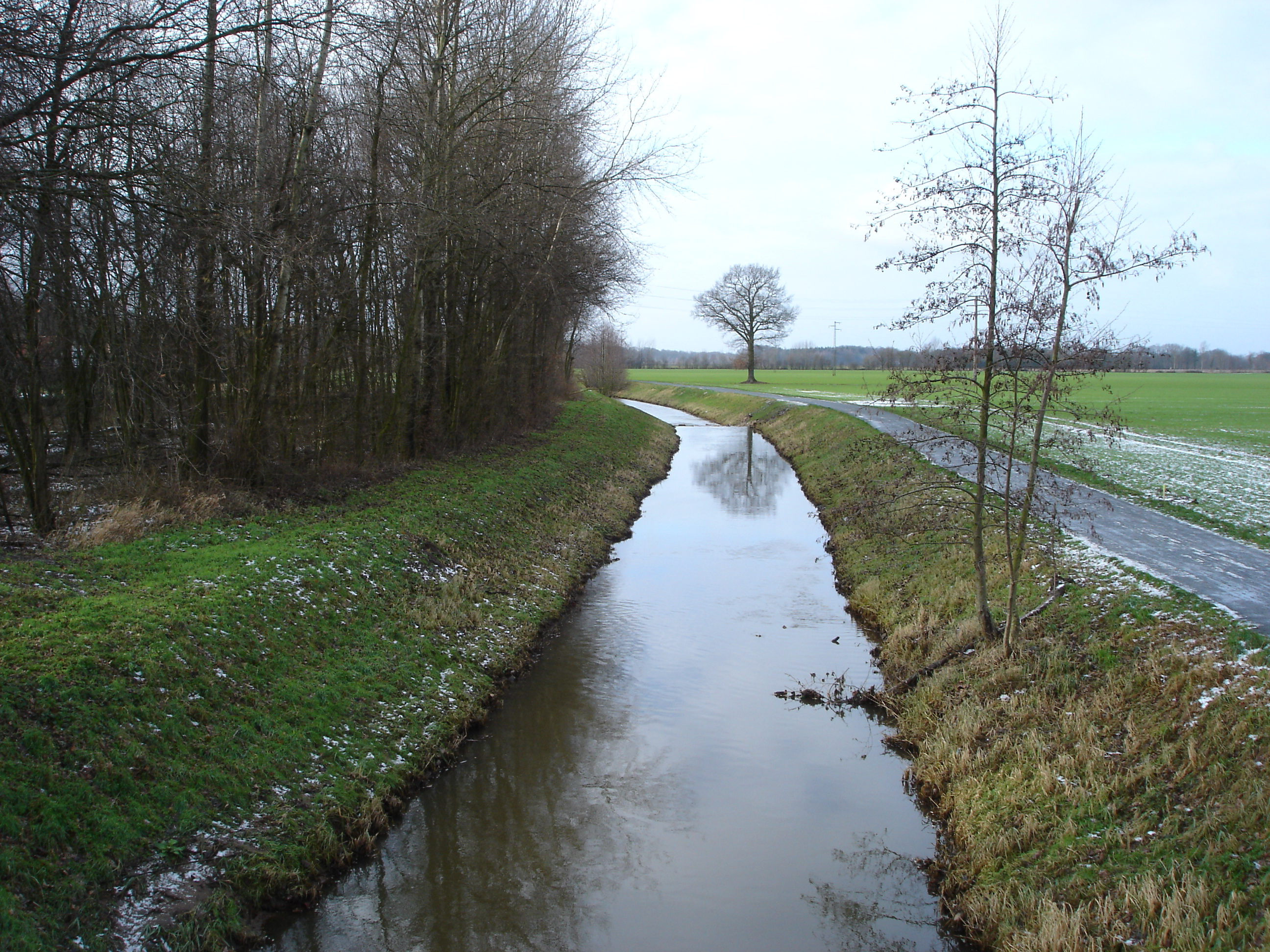

Location
- Country: Germany
- State: North Rhine-Westphalia

Physical characteristics
- Mouth
  - location: Speller Aa
  - coordinates: 52.3618°N 7.4751°E
- Length: 36.1 km (22.4 mi)
- Basin size: 139 km^{2} (54 sq mi)

Basin features
- Progression: Speller Aa→ Große Aa→ Ems→ North Sea

Dreierwalder Aa (also: Ibbenbürener Aa, Ledder Mühlenbach, Hörsteler Aa) is a river of North Rhine-Westphalia, Germany. It flows into the Speller Aa in Spelle.

== See also ==
- List of rivers of North Rhine-Westphalia
