= Kleine Aa =

Kleine Aa may refer to:

- Chli Aa (Schwyz), a river in canton of Schwyz, Switzerland
- Chli Aa (Sempachersee), a tributary of Lake Sempach in the canton of Lucerne, Switzerland
- Kleine Aa (Aabach), a tributary of the Aabach in North Rhine-Westphalia, Germany
- Kleine Aa (Someren), headwater stream of the Aa (Meuse) in the province of North Brabant, Netherlands

== See also ==
- AA (disambiguation)
