= AA Book =

AA Book may refer to:

- Projects Review, or the AA Book, of the Architectural Association School of Architecture
- The Big Book of Alcoholics Anonymous
- Books published by The Automobile Association

== See also ==
- AA (disambiguation)
