= Van der Aa (surname) =

Van der Aa is a Dutch toponymic surname meaning "from the Aa (river)", of which there are a few dozen in the Low Countries alone.

Those bearing this name include:

- Abraham Jacob van der Aa (1792–1857), Dutch author of biographical and geographical dictionaries of the Netherlands
- Christianus Carolus Henricus van der Aa (1718–1793), Dutch pastor and secretary of science society
- Christianus Robidé van der Aa (1791–1851), Dutch jurist and writer
- Cornelis van der Aa (1749–1816), Dutch historian
- Dirk van der Aa (1731–1809), Dutch painter
- Hubertus Antonius van der Aa (1935–2017), Dutch mycologist
- Jan III van Gruuthuse en van der Aa (1368–1420), Flemish-Burgundian knight
- Michel van der Aa (born 1970), Dutch composer
- Petrus van der Aa (1530–1594), Brabantine jurist
- Philips van der Aa (died after 1586), Dutch politician
- Pieter van der Aa (1659–1733), Dutch publisher
- Sandra van der Aa (born 1972), Dutch athlete

== See also ==
- Aa (surname)
