= Aa, Indonesia =

Place in South Sulawesi, Indonesia

Coordinates: 03°05′21″S 119°54′37″E

Aa is a populated place in the South Sulawesi province of Indonesia.
