= Steinfurter Aa =

River in Germany

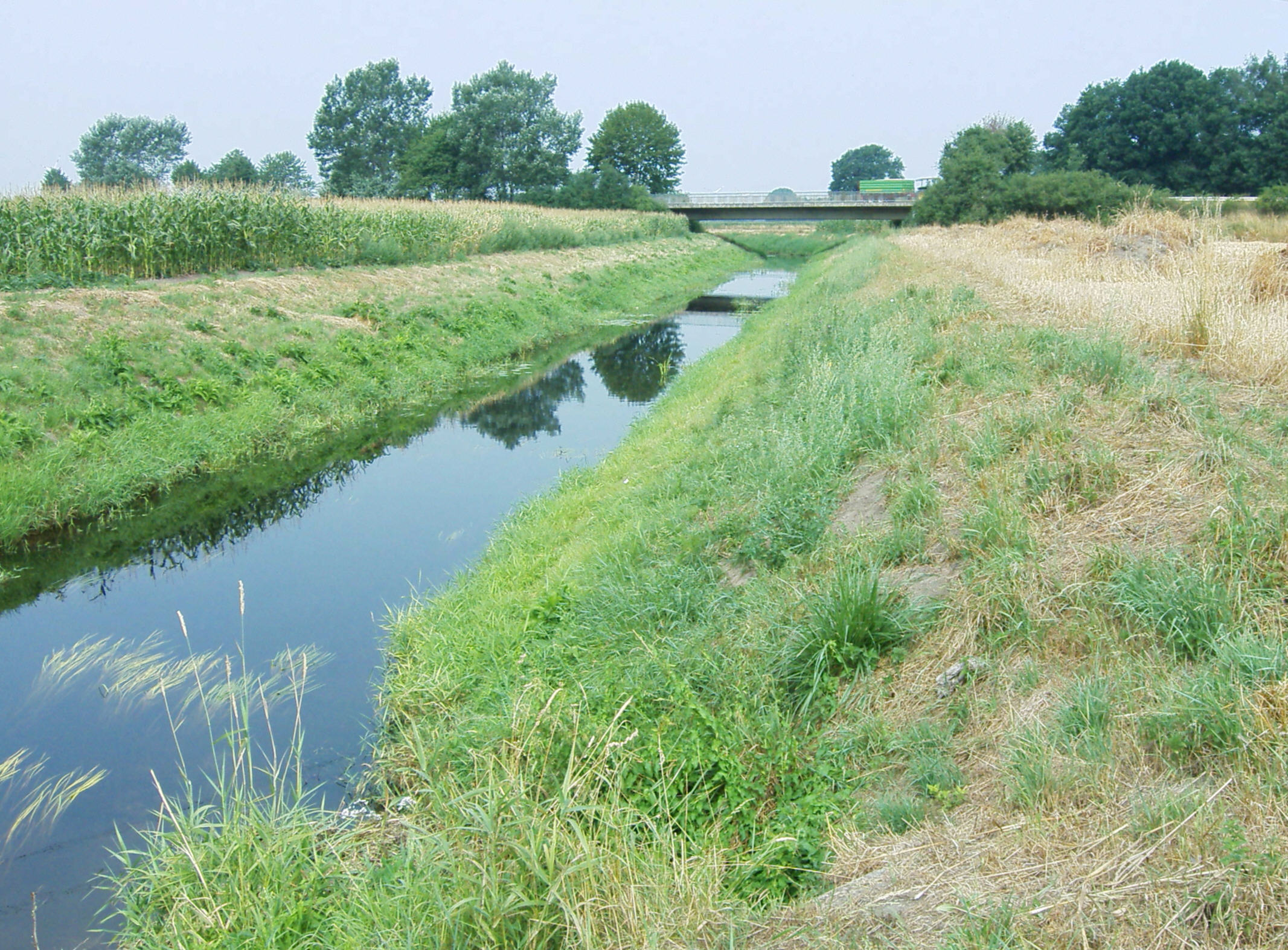

Location
- Country: Germany
- State: North Rhine-Westphalia

Physical characteristics
- Mouth
  - location: Vechte
  - coordinates: 52.2515°N 7.2958°E
- Length: 46.4 km (28.8 mi)
- Basin size: 205 km^{2} (79 sq mi)

Basin features
- Progression: Vechte→ Zwarte Water→ IJsselmeer

Steinfurter Aa is a river of North Rhine-Westphalia, Germany. It flows through Steinfurt, and joins the Vechte near Wettringen.

== See also ==
- List of rivers of North Rhine-Westphalia
