= Automobile Association =

Automobile Association may refer to:

== Organisations ==
=== Asia ===
- Automobile Association of Bangladesh in Bangladesh.

=== Europe ===
- The AA, formerly AA plc, also formerly AA Limited, and formerly The Automobile Association, in the United Kingdom
- AA Ireland in Ireland
- ADAC (Allgemeiner Deutscher Automobil Club) in Germany
- RACE (automobile association) (Real Automóvil Club de España) in Spain

=== North America ===
- Canadian Automobile Association (CAA) in Canada
- American Automobile Association (AAA) in the United States
- USAA (United Services Automobile Association) in the United States

=== Oceania ===
- Australian Automobile Association (AAA) in Australia
- New Zealand Automobile Association (AA or NZAA) in New Zealand

=== Other ===
- Automobile Association of South Africa (AA) in South Africa
- Western India Automobile Association (WIAA) in India

== Other uses ==
- Fédération Internationale de l'Automobile (FIA), governing body for motor racing
