= Schaler Aa =

River in Germany

Schaler Aa: Halverder-Schaler Aa; Halverder Aa; Weeser Aa

Location
- Country: Germany
- States: Lower Saxony; North Rhine-Westphalia

Physical characteristics
- Source
  - coordinates: 52.4803°N 7.8487°E
- Mouth
  - location: Große Aa
  - coordinates: 52.4726°N 7.5593°E
- Length: 31.0 km (19.3 mi)
- Basin size: 137 km^{2} (53 sq mi)

Basin features
- Progression: Große Aa→ Ems→ North Sea

Schaler Aa is a river of Lower Saxony and North Rhine-Westphalia, Germany. It flows into the Große Aa south of Freren.

The river springs as Weeser Aa southeast of the Ankum Heights and east of Merzen in Lower Saxony. After crossing the boundary between Lower Saxony and North Rhine-Westphalia, it changes it name into Halverder Aa and near Halverde (a district of Hopsten) into Halverder-Schaler Aa. Near Schale (a district of Hopsten), it changes its name again into Schaler Aa. Finally, it discharges into the Große Aa south of Freren.

== See also ==
- List of rivers of Lower Saxony
- List of rivers of North Rhine-Westphalia
