= Aa (surname) =

Scandinavian surname list

Aa is a Scandinavian surname. Notable people with the surname include:

- Brynjar Aa (born 1960), Norwegian dramatist
- Terje Aa (born 1961), Norwegian bridge player

== See also ==
- Van der Aa (surname)
- Anuel AA (born 1992), stage name of Puerto Rican singer/rapper Emmanuel Gazmey Santiago
