= Speller Aa =

River in Germany

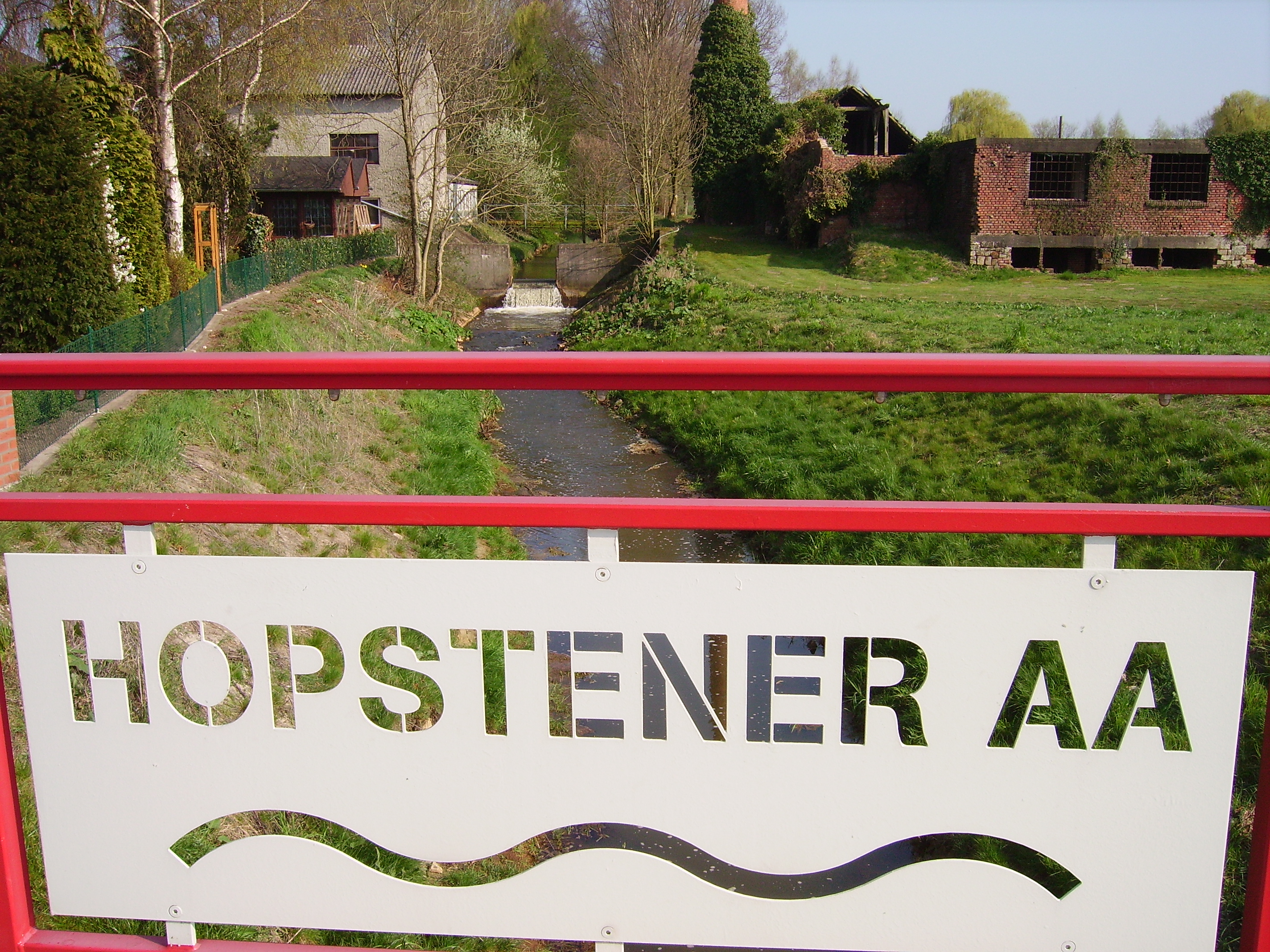

Location
- Country: Germany
- States: North Rhine-Westphalia; Lower Saxony

Physical characteristics
- Mouth
  - location: Große Aa
  - coordinates: 52.4202°N 7.3763°E
- Length: 49.2 km (30.6 mi)
- Basin size: 371 km^{2} (143 sq mi)

Basin features
- Progression: Große Aa→ Ems→ North Sea

Speller Aa is a river of North Rhine-Westphalia and Lower Saxony, Germany. It flows into the Große Aa near Lünne.

The upper reaches of the Speller Aa have other names, from the source to the mouth Stollenbach, Mettinger Aa, Recker Aa, Hopstener Aa, Speller Aa.

== See also ==
- List of rivers of Lower Saxony
