= Lake Sempach =

Lake in Switzerland

- Sempachersee
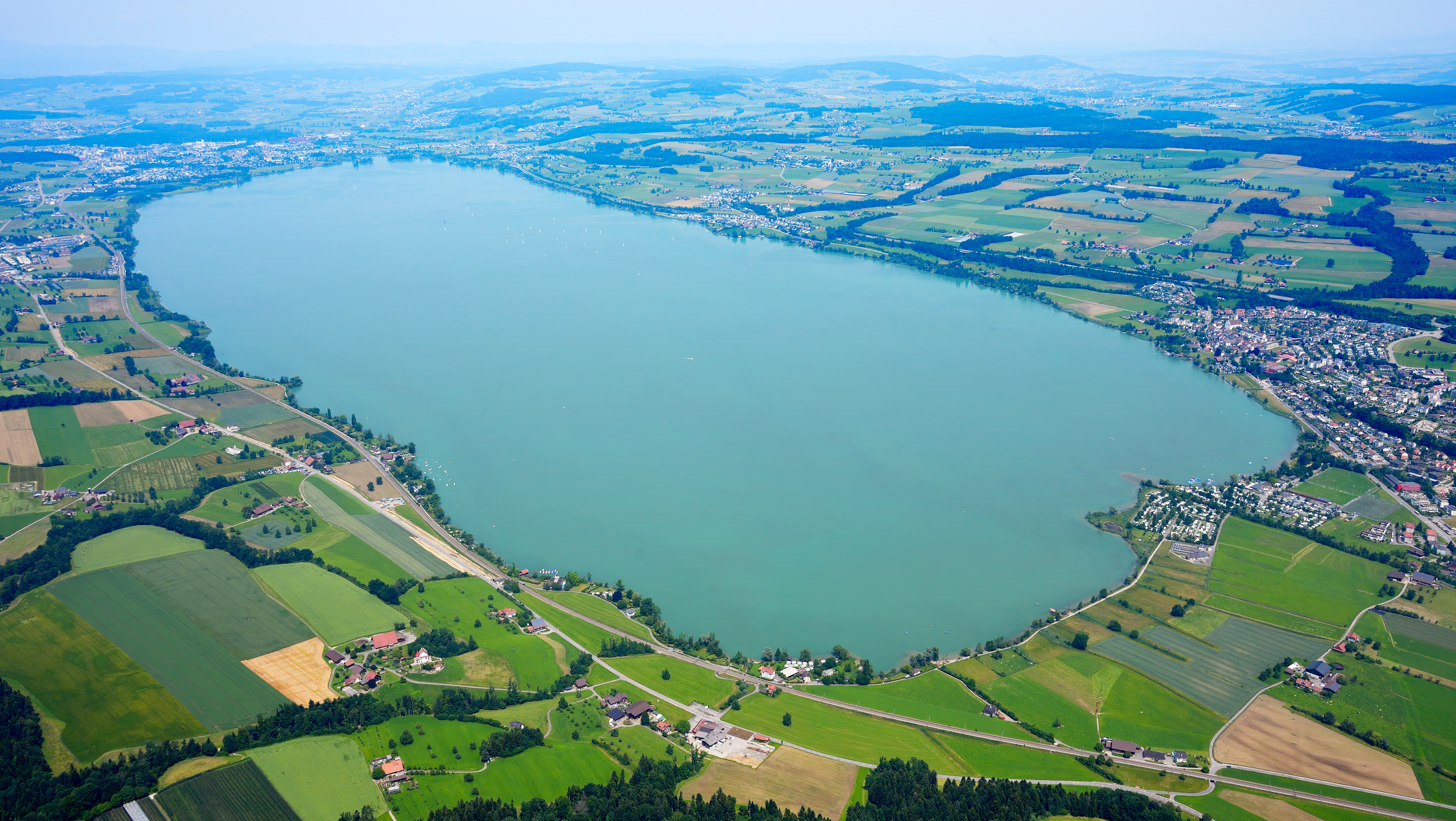

- Location within Canton of Lucerne Location within Switzerland Location within Alps
- Interactive map of Lake Sempach
- Location: Canton of Lucerne
- Coordinates: 47°8.6667′N 8°9.1′E
- Primary inflows: Gross Aa, Chli Aa (Sempachersee), Meierhofbach, Wilibach, Dorfbach (Sempachersee), Brandbach, Röllbach (Sempachersee), Lipperütibach, and some unnamed
- Primary outflows: Suhre
- Basin countries: Switzerland
- Surface area: 14.5 km^{2} (5.6 sq mi)
- Average depth: 44 m (144 ft)
- Max. depth: 87 m (285 ft)
- Water volume: 0.66 km^{3} (540,000 acre⋅ft)
- Residence time: 16.9 years
- Surface elevation: 503.77 m (1,652.8 ft)
- Islands: Gamma Insel
- Settlements: Sursee, Sempach

Lake Sempach (German: Sempachersee, Swiss Standard German pronunciation: [ˈzɛmpaxərˌzeː]) is a lake in the canton of Lucerne, Switzerland. Its area is about 14.5 km^{2} (5.6 sq mi) and its maximum depth is 87 m (285 ft).

A 50-metre-large (160 ft) island named Gamma Insel is located east of Sursee.

In the 17th century the lake counted with five ferries, that brought goods to the weekly market in Sursee.

Many inhabitants of local areas swim, boat, paddle, and fish in Lake Sempach, due to its ease of accessibility.
