= Große Aa =

River in Germany

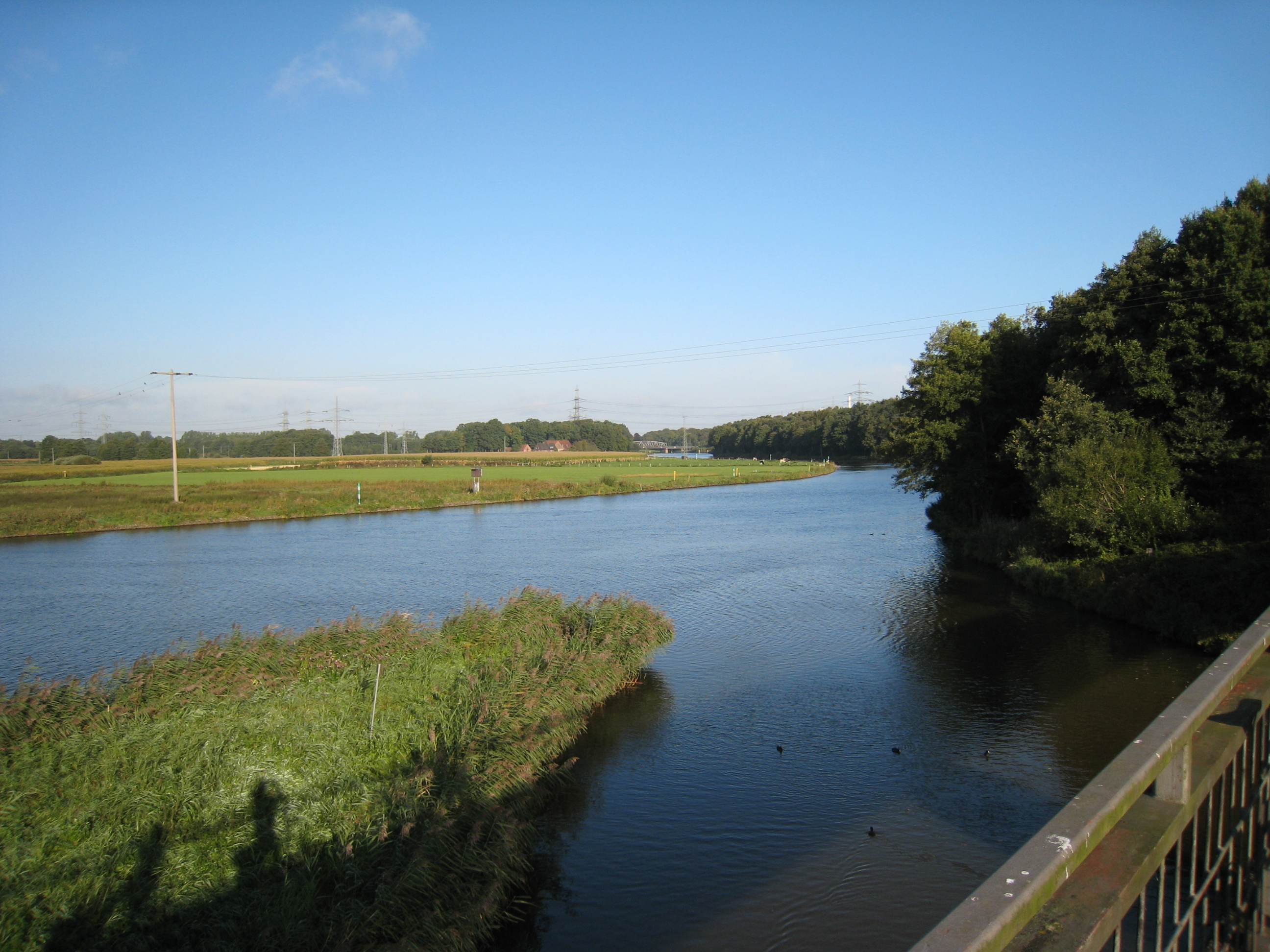
- The confluence of the Große Aa with the Ems

Location
- Country: Germany
- State: Lower Saxony
- Reference no.: DE: 34

Physical characteristics
- Source
  - location: Beginning: confluence of the Deeper Aa and Ahe east of Freren
  - coordinates: 52°28′45″N 7°34′00″E
  - elevation: 33 m above sea level (NN) (Deeper Aa 53 m above NN, Ahe 82 m above NN)
- Mouth
  - location: south of Lingen
  - coordinates: 52°27′37″N 7°19′29″E
  - elevation: 22 m above sea level (NN)
- Length: 35.0 km (21.7 mi)
- Basin size: 922 km^{2} (356 sq mi)

Basin features
- Progression: Ems→ North Sea
- Landmarks: Villages: Beesten, Lünne
- Tributaries
  - left: Schaler Aa, Bardelgraben, Moosbeeke, Giegel Aa, Linner Graben, Speller Aa
  - right: Reitbach, Schinken Canal, Südbach

The Große Aa is a 35-kilometre-long (22 mi), right, eastern tributary of the River Ems in western Lower Saxony (Germany).

It begins in the Samtgemeinde Freren, near the quarter of Overwater, at the confluence of the Deeper Aa and Ahe rivers. From there is flows through Lünne westwards to Hesselte, where it is joined by the Speller Aa. From there on it runs parallel to the Dortmund–Ems Canal and discharges into the Ems 6 km (3.7 mi) south of Lingen, a few metres north of the mouth of the canal after the Gleesen locks.

== See also ==
- List of rivers of Lower Saxony
