= Manfred von Knobelsdorff =

Manfred von Knobelsdorff, Lieutenant Colonel Waffen-SS, (born 15 June 1892 in Berlin-Spandau, died 1965) oversaw much of Wewelsburg Castle from February 12, 1935, through January 24, 1938, where he presided over several ceremonies. In 1938 Siegfried Taubert succeeded Knobelsdorff.

He is believed to have been a follower of Irminism.

His wife Ilse was the sister of Minister of Agriculture Walther Darré.

- 07.02.1934 SS-Sturmführer
- 09.11.1934 SS-Obersturmführer
- 28.05.1935 SS-Hauptsturmführer
- 29.01.1936 SS-Sturmbannführer
- 24.01.1938 SS-Obersturmbannführer
- 12.02.1935 - 24.01.1938 ”Burghauptmann von Wewelsburg” (SS-Ordensburg)

== Sources ==
- Kirsten John-Stucke:Wewelsburg
