= Kirsten John-Stucke =

German historian (born 1966)

Kirsten John-Stucke (born 1966 in Unna) is a German historian, non-fiction author, and museum director of the Wewelsburg Museum. She is the editor of numerous documentations on the history of Wewelsburg during the National Socialist era and on the history of the Niederhagen concentration camp. The focus of her work lies in commemorative culture, educational memorial work, and in the re-conception of the Wewelsburg Memorial and Museum from 1933 to 1945.

== Life and work ==
After completing her secondary education, Kirsten John attended the Westfälische Wilhelms-Universität Münster to study modern and contemporary history, German studies, and journalism. During her studies in 1990, she completed an internship at the Kreismuseum Wewelsburg and worked until 1993 as an educational assistant for the documentation 'Wewelsburg 1933 – 1945: Cult and Terror Site of the SS.' Her master's thesis focused on the Serious Bible Researchers among the prisoners of the Wewelsburg concentration camp.

After graduating, she spent two years in Bremerhaven, undertaking a scientific traineeship at the Morgenstern-Museum, the Historical Museum of the city of Bremerhaven. Since 1995, she has worked as a research assistant at the Kreismuseum Wewelsburg, where she served as the deputy director from 1999. Following the passing of the longtime museum director Wulff E. Brebeck, she assumed the position of museum director in 2011. Additionally, she conducts research and documents the history of the Niederhagen concentration camp and its various prisoner groups. In the ZDF documentary series 'Böse Bauten' (Evil Buildings), Kirsten John-Stucke explained the handling of Nazi architecture at Wewelsburg.

Kirsten John-Stucke is a board member of the Working Group of Nazi Memorials and Places of Remembrance in North Rhine-Westphalia, part of the scientific project advisory board for the NS Documentation Vogelsang, and a member of the advisory board of the Paderborn Antiquities Association.

Kirsten John-Stucke is married and has two children.

== Literature ==
=== Books ===
- Häftlinge im Konzentrationslager in Wewelsburg unter besonderer Berücksichtigung der Ernsten Bibelforscher. Master's thesis (1993)
- "Mein Vater wird gesucht …". Häftlinge des Konzentrationslagers in Wewelsburg, (2001)
- 12 Jahre – 12 Schicksale. Fallbeispiele zur NS-Opfergruppe Jehovas Zeugen in Nordrhein-Westfalen 1933–1945. (2006, together with Michael Krenzer & Johannes Wrobel)
- Die Wewelsburg 1933–1945. SS-Größenwahn und KZ-Terror. CD-Rom mit Begleitheft, (2007, together with Wulff E. Brebeck, Karl Hüser)
- Endzeitkämpfer. Ideologie und Terror der SS. (2011, jointly with Wulff E. Brebeck, Frank Huismann & Jörg Piron)
- Mythos Wewelsburg. Fakten und Legenden. (2015, jointly with Daniela Siepe)
- Die Körper der SS – Ideologie, Propaganda und Gewalt. Begleitband zur Sonderausstellung vom 19. Juni – 4. September 2016 im Burgsaal der Wewelsburg. (2016, jointly with Erik Beck, Markus Moors & Jörg Piron)
- Wir machen ein Fass auf! Bier brauen und trinken im Paderborner Land. Begleitband zur Sonderausstellung vom 1. Juni – 2. September 2018 im Burgsaal der Wewelsburg. (2018, with Erik Beck, Markus Moors, Jörg Piron)

=== Essays ===
- Zeugen Jehovas im Konzentrationslager in Wewelsburg. In: Hans Hesse (Hrsg.): "Am mutigsten waren immer wieder die Zeugen Jehovas". Verfolgung und Widerstand der Zeugen Jehovas im Nationalsozialismus, Bremen 1998, S. 63–75.
- Konzentrationslager Niederhagen/Wewelsburg. In: Jan Erik Schulte (Hrsg.): Konzentrationslager im Rheinland und in Westfalen 1933–1945. Zwischen zentraler Steuerung und regionaler Initiative. Paderborn 2005, S. 97–112.
- Wewelsburg. In: Wolfgang Benz, Barbara Distel: Der Ort des Terrors. Geschichte der nationalsozialistischen Konzentrationslager, Bd. 3 (Sachsenhausen, Buchenwald; hier zu Sachsenhausen). München 2006, S. 286–288.
- Konzentrationslager Niederhagen/Wewelsburg. In: Wolfgang Benz, Barbara Distel: Der Ort des Terrors. Geschichte der nationalsozialistischen Konzentrationslager, Bd. 7 (Niederhagen/Wewelsburg, Lublin-Majdanek, Arbeitsdorf, Herzogenbusch (Vught), Bergen-Belsen, Mittelbau-Dora). München 2008, S. 15–29.
- Die Wewelsburg: Renaissanceschloss – "SS-Schule" – Erinnerungsort – Ausflugsziel. In: Heinz-Dieter Quack, Albrecht Steinecke (Hrsg.): Dark Tourism. Faszination des Schreckens (= Paderborner Geographische Studien zu Tourismusforschung und Destinationsmanagement, Bd. 25), Paderborn 2012, S. 179–191.
- Sinti und Roma im KZ Niederhagen/Wewelsburg (Büren-Wewelsburg). In: Karola Fings, Ulrich F. Opfermann (Hrsg.): Zigeunerverfolgung im Rheinland und in Westfalen 1933–1945. Geschichte, Aufarbeitung und Erinnerung. Paderborn 2012, S. 101–107.
- Zwischen "Mystifizierung" und "Authentizität". Überlegungen zum Umgang mit der extremen Rechten an sogenannten Täterorten. In: Hans-Peter Killguss, Martin Langebach (Hrsg.): "Opa war in Ordnung!" Erinnerungspolitik der extremen Rechten Contributions and materials from the Information and Education Center against Right-wing Extremism in the NS Documentation Center of the City of Cologne, Vol. 8), Cologne 2016, pp. 144–159 (with Heiko Klare, Stefan Wunsch)
