= Siegfried Taubert =

German SS general and functionary

- Born: 11 December 1880; Brallentin, Pomerania, Kingdom of Prussia, German Empire
- Died: 13 February 1946 (aged 65); Kiel, Allied-occupied Germany
- Military career
- Allegiance: German Empire; Weimar Republic; Nazi Germany
- Branch: Imperial German Army; Reichswehr; Waffen-SS
- Service years: 1900–1919; 1931–1945
- Rank: Major; SS-Obergruppenführer
- Commands: Burghauptmann (Castle Captain), Wewelsburg
- Conflicts: World War I World War II
- Awards: Iron Cross, 1st and 2nd class War Merit Cross

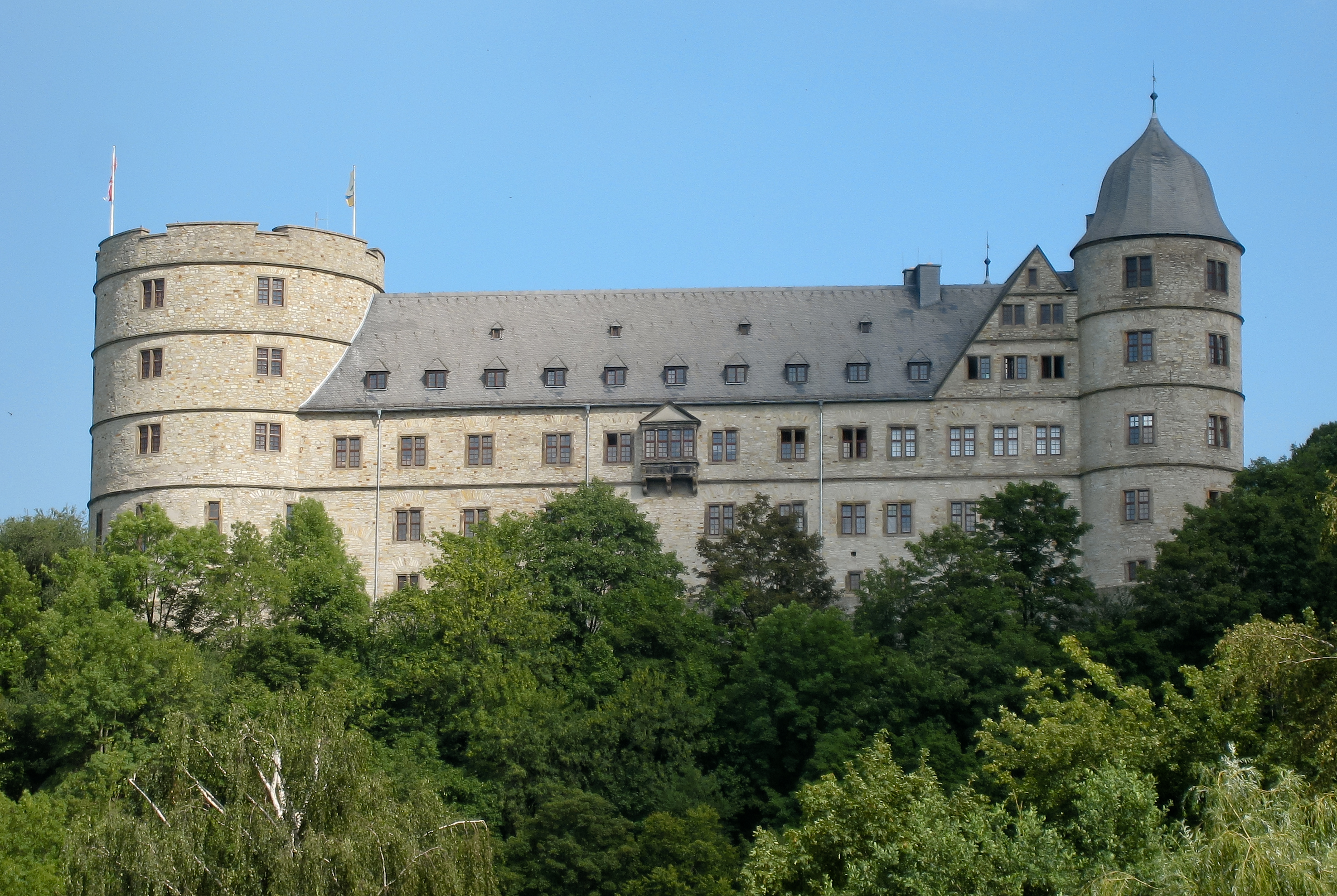
From 1938 to 1945 Taubert was the captain of the SS Wewelsburg castle

Siegfried Taubert (11 December 1880 – 13 February 1946) was a Nazi, an SS-Obergruppenführer and a General of the Waffen-SS. From 1935 to 1938, Taubert was the chief of staff in Reinhard Heydrich's Sicherheitsdienst (Security Service; SD) in SS headquarters. From 1938 to 1945, he was the Burghauptmann (Castle Captain) at Wewelsburg castle, which was Heinrich Himmler's SS headquarters and training center for high-ranking SS officers. Taubert died in Kiel in 1946.

== Early life and World War I ==
Siegfried Taubert was born on 11 December 1880 in Brallentin in Pomerania, (today, Bralęcin, Poland); his father was a Protestant pastor. After passing his university entrance test, enrolled in military school as a Fahnenjunker (cadet). He was assigned to the Infantry Regiment Duke Ferdinand von Braunschweig 57 in Wesel-Westphalia. On 5 May 1904, he married Arnoldine Johanna Juta from the Netherlands; they had three children, including Ilse, who married Ernst-Robert Grawitz a SS German physician. From 1914 to 1918, he was a career officer during World War I. In November 1919, he was discharged from the army with the rank of Major.

From 1921 to 1924, Taubert served as managing director of the Pomeranian Land League and as a leader of Der Stahlhelm, the German veterans' organization, in the Greifenhagen district. In August 1925, Taubert sold his house in Greifenhagen, moved to Berlin and worked as a sales manager in a piano factory. From early September 1929 to early October 1931, he worked as an insurance clerk at the Swiss Life Insurance and Pension Institute in Berlin, after which he became unemployed. He then became politically active in the nationalist Tannenbergbund and the Frontbann, a front organization of the paramilitary Sturmabteilung (SA).

== Nazi career and World War II ==
In 1931, Taubert join the Nazi Party (membership number 525,246) and the Schutzstaffel (SS number 23,128). Working for SS General Kurt Daluege, he was promoted to SS-Oberführer. From 1935 to 1938, Taubert was chief of staff in Reinhard Heydrich's Sicherheitsdienst (Security Service; SD) in the main SS office. On 13 September 1936, he was promoted to SS-Brigadeführer.

From 1938 to 1945, Taubert was the Burghauptmann (Castle Captain) at Wewelsburg castle, succeeding Manfred von Knobelsdorff. Wewelsburg castle was Heinrich Himmler's SS headquarters and ideological training center for high-ranking SS officers. Taubert's duties often took him away from the Wewelsburg castle. Before the war, Taubert used the Reich Labor Service for Himmler's SS Research and Education Center projects at the castle, When the war in Europe started, he then used concentration camp inmates. The inmate laborers were housed behind barbed wire in the neighboring village of Niederhage. Taubert became a lay judge at the People's Court Volksgerichtshof. He also was the adjutant captain of the castle Gottlieb Bernhardt. In October 1943, Taubert visited the Princess Sophie of Greece and Denmark at Himmler request. In 1943, he was promoted to SS-Obergruppenführer and General of the Waffen-SS.

Near the end of World War II in Europe, on 31 March 1945, Taubert fled from Wewelsburg castle to Schleswig-Holstein as the US 3rd Armored Division approached the castle. Knowing that US Army was coming, Taubert had the castle antiquities and artworks packed and moved to the nearby Boddeker estate, while others were moved and hidden in other facilities and nearby homes. Some art was hidden within the walls of the estate’s buildings. Himmler ordered Wewelsburg castle destroyed, but Taubert refused. Taubert died in Kiel in 1946.

== Ranks ==
- Fahnenjunker: 30 August 1899
- Fähnrich: 18 April 1900
- Leutnant: 18 January 1901
- Oberleutnant: 22 March 1910
- Hauptmann: 5 September 1914
- Major i.G :[1] 22 February 1919
- SS-Anwärter: 2 January 1932
- SS-Mann: 10 September 1932
- SS-Truppführer: 17 February 1933
- SS-Untersturmführer: 12 June 1933
- SS-Obersturmführer: 3 September 1933
- SS-Hauptsturmführer: 9 November 1933
- SS-Sturmbannführer: 1 January 1934
- SS-Obersturmbannführer: 20 April 1934
- SS-Standartenführer: 4 July 1934
- SS-Oberführer: 15 September 1935
- SS-Brigadeführer: 13 September 1936
- SS-Gruppenführer: 11 September 1938
- SS-Obergruppenführer and General of the Waffen-SS on 30 January 1943

== Awards ==
- Iron Cross (1914) 2nd and 1st class
- Wound Badge (1918) in black
- War Merit Cross (1939) with swords 2nd class
- Honour Sword of Reichsführer-SS
- SS skull ring
- Hanseatic Cross
- Cross for Military Merit, 3rd Class
- War Merit Cross, 1st Class
- Honour Chevron for the Old Guard
- Nazi Party Long Service Award

== See also ==
- Register of SS leaders in general's rank
- Chiemsee Cauldron
- Heinz Macher
- Nazism and occultism
- Ordensburg Vogelsang
