= Niederhagen concentration camp =

German Nazi concentration camp

Coordinates: 51°36′27.79″N 8°39′42.93″E

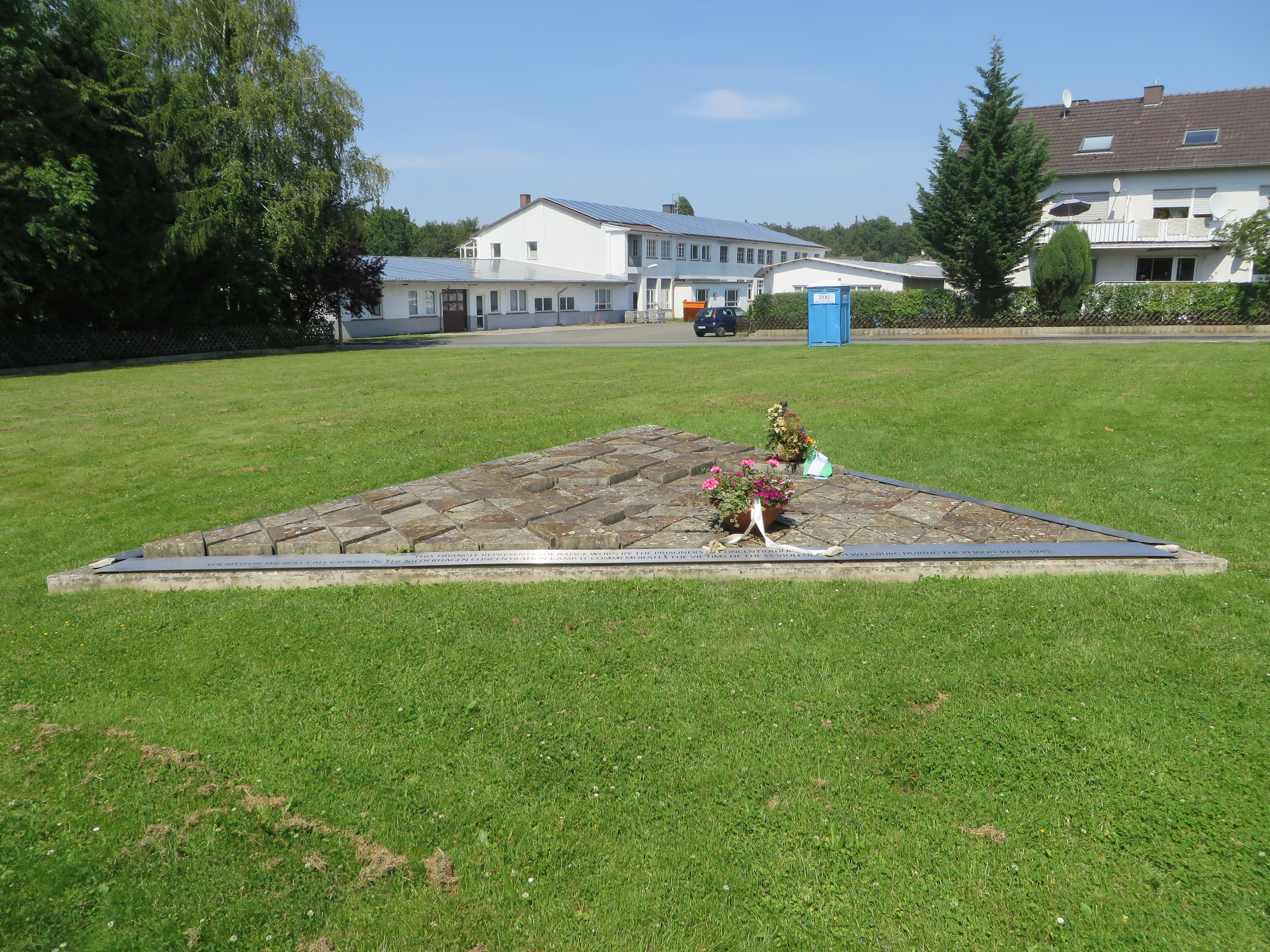
Memorial on the former site of the camp

Niederhagen was a Nazi concentration camp on the outskirts of Büren-Wewelsburg which existed from 1941 to 1943 when it was disbanded.

== Camp ==
From May 1939, a small camp, the Wewelsburg satellite camp of Sachsenhausen concentration camp, existed on the site. The inmates were used as slave laborers for the development of Wewelsburg Castle, which – according to Himmler's plans – was to be the "center of the world" after the "Final Victory". The first 100 prisoners came from the Sachsenhausen concentration camp. At first the inmates were housed in a tent at the foot of the hill on which the castle stands, later in huts on the hill opposite Wewelsburg castle(the Kuhkampsberg).

A move to a newly built camp in the Niederhagen suburb of Wewelsburg followed. In September 1941, when the camp became an independent concentration camp under the name Niederhagen concentration camp, 480 prisoners were interned there. From 1941, more and more prisoners from outside Germany were imprisoned in the camp. The approximately 3,900 prisoners included Jehovah's Witnesses, political prisoners, Sinti and Romani people, Yeniche, homosexuals, Jews, prisoners of war and forced laborers from Poland, the Soviet Union (also prisoners of war), Czechoslovakia, France, the Netherlands and Belgium. Almost a third of them did not survive their imprisonment. The deaths of 1,285 prisoners are recorded. They died of hunger, cold, disease and the consequences of ill-treatment. In 1942, a crematorium was built specifically for the camp. The Gestapo also used the camp as a place for executions. A total of 56 people from Westphalia-Lippe, including women and children, were executed there on the orders of Heinrich Himmler. In the period from 1 September 1941 to 1 May 1943, the camp was an independent concentration camp. Before, it had been a satellite camp first of the Sachsenhausen and then of the Buchenwald concentration camp. From 1943, only 50 people were imprisoned at Niederhagen. Eventually, they were liberated by the U.S. army on 2 April 1945. Today, not much is left of the camp; the former camp kitchen houses the local fire station of the volunteer fire department and some apartments, the gatehouse is now a two-family house, while a residential estate was built over the rest of the former camp.

=== Camp commanders ===
During the period as a labor camp the following SS-officers served as Lagerführer:

- Wolfgang Plaul (SS Officer)
- SS Hauptsturmführer Adolf Haas, July 1941 – September 1941
- SS Hauptsturmführer Adolf Haas served as commandant of the independent Niederhagen concentration camp from September 1941 until 1943, when the camp was disbanded and he was transferred to Bergen-Belsen.

== See also ==
- Nazi concentration camps
- List of Nazi concentration camps
- List of concentration and internment camps
- The Holocaust
- World War II

== Literature ==
- Karl Hüser, Wulff E. Brebeck: Wewelsburg 1933-1945. Das Konzentrationslager. Revision: Kirsten John-Stucke. 4th edition. Münster: Westfälisches Landesmedienzentrum 2002. (= Reihe: Dokumente der Zeitgeschichte, Heft 5).
- Andreas Pflock, Gerrit Visser (1894-1942) - Von Hengelo nach Wewelsburg - Van Hengelo naar Wewelsburg, Lebensstationen und Briefe des niederländischen Gewerkschafters aus nationalsozialistischer Gefangenschaft - Levensloop en brieven van de Nederlandse vakbondsman uit het nationaal-socialistische gevangenschap. Niederländisch-Deutsch (2005). 279 Seiten, 67 Photos, fester Einband. ISBN 3-932610-35-0
- Pierpaolo Tavino, "Niederhagen - Il Segreto Perduto". Italia, CreateSpace Independent Publishing Platform, 2015. ISBN 1515155412
