= Hermann Bartels =

German architect and member of the SS

- Born: 14 April 1900; Minden, Westphalia, German Empire
- Died: 13 January 1989 (aged 88); Essen, Westphalia, Germany
- Occupation: Architect
- SS career
- Allegiance: Nazi Germany
- Branch: Schutzstaffel
- Conflicts: World War II

Hermann Bartels (14 April 1900 – 13 January 1989) was a German architect and member of the Nazi Party and the Schutzstaffel (SS).

== Career as an architect for the Nazi Party ==
Bartels was personally close to Heinrich Himmler, who put Bartels to work on rebuilding castles, and as such the Reichsführer-SS gave Bartels the rank of SS-Standartenführer in June 1942. In this capacity it was Bartels who redesigned the Wewelsburg castle as both the SS school and host of meetings of the leadership. Bartels was attached to the Wewelsburg Office, headed by Standartenführer Siegfried Albert Taubert, from 1934 to 1937. Bartels designs made liberal use of the Black Sun occult symbol, specifically on the floor of the Marble Hall and as such helped to promote its later use by neo-Nazis and Nazi mystics. He also redesigned the official residence of Joseph Goebbels after the propaganda minister had declared himself unsatisfied with the original plans designed by Albert Speer.

Bartels also filled the role of Gaukulturwart (Districy cultural leader) in Münster demonstrating a keen interest in environmental conservation at this post.
