= Bernhard Frank =

German SS officer (1913–2011)

Obersturmbannführer (Lieutenant Colonel) Bernhard Frank (15 July 1913 – 29 June 2011) was an SS Commander of the Obersalzberg complex who arrested Hermann Göring on April 25, 1945, by order of Adolf Hitler, who had been manipulated by Reichsleiter Bormann into believing Göring was attempting to usurp the Führer's authority. Frank placed Göring under house arrest but ignored later orders to execute the Reichsmarschall.

Frank was reportedly one of the few Schutzstaffel officers inducted into the rites at Wewelsburg Castle, and after the war claimed that he had arranged the eventual surrender of Berchtesgaden (where Hitler's mountain residence, the Berghof, was located), to prevent needless damage to the Berghof. He later wrote a 144-page book entitled Hitler, Göring and the Obersalzberg. After the war, he was taken prisoner by the Americans and interned until 1948.

In December 2010, Mark Gould announced that he had spent several years befriending Frank and coaxing his story out of him, and that Frank had confessed to him a role in the Holocaust far more extensive than had previously been known. Gould recorded their conversations, and says that in one of them Frank told him that on July 28, 1941, he signed an order that led to the SS massacre of Jews in Korets, including relatives of Gould's adoptive father. Gould released an edited extract of his recordings on the internet.

According to Gould, this order was "the first order of the Reich instructing the mass murder of hundreds of thousands of Jews, later turning into the Nazi systematic extermination machine. Historian Guy Walters described this characterisation as "pure junk"; in an article downplaying Gould's findings, he denounced as "ludicrous" the idea that Frank "somehow started the Holocaust".
