= Bralęcin =

- Village
- Location within Poland
- Coordinates: 53°14′14″N 15°13′44″E
- Country: Poland
- Voivodeship: West Pomeranian
- County: Stargard
- Gmina: Dolice
- Population: 340

Bralęcin [braˈlɛnt͡ɕin] (German: Brallentin) is a village in the administrative district of Gmina Dolice, within Stargard County, West Pomeranian Voivodeship, in north-western Poland. It lies approximately 17 km (11 mi) south-east of Stargard and 48 km (30 mi) south-east of the regional capital Szczecin.

The village has a population of 340.
