= Wewelsburg (village) =

Coordinates: 51.606°N 8.652°E

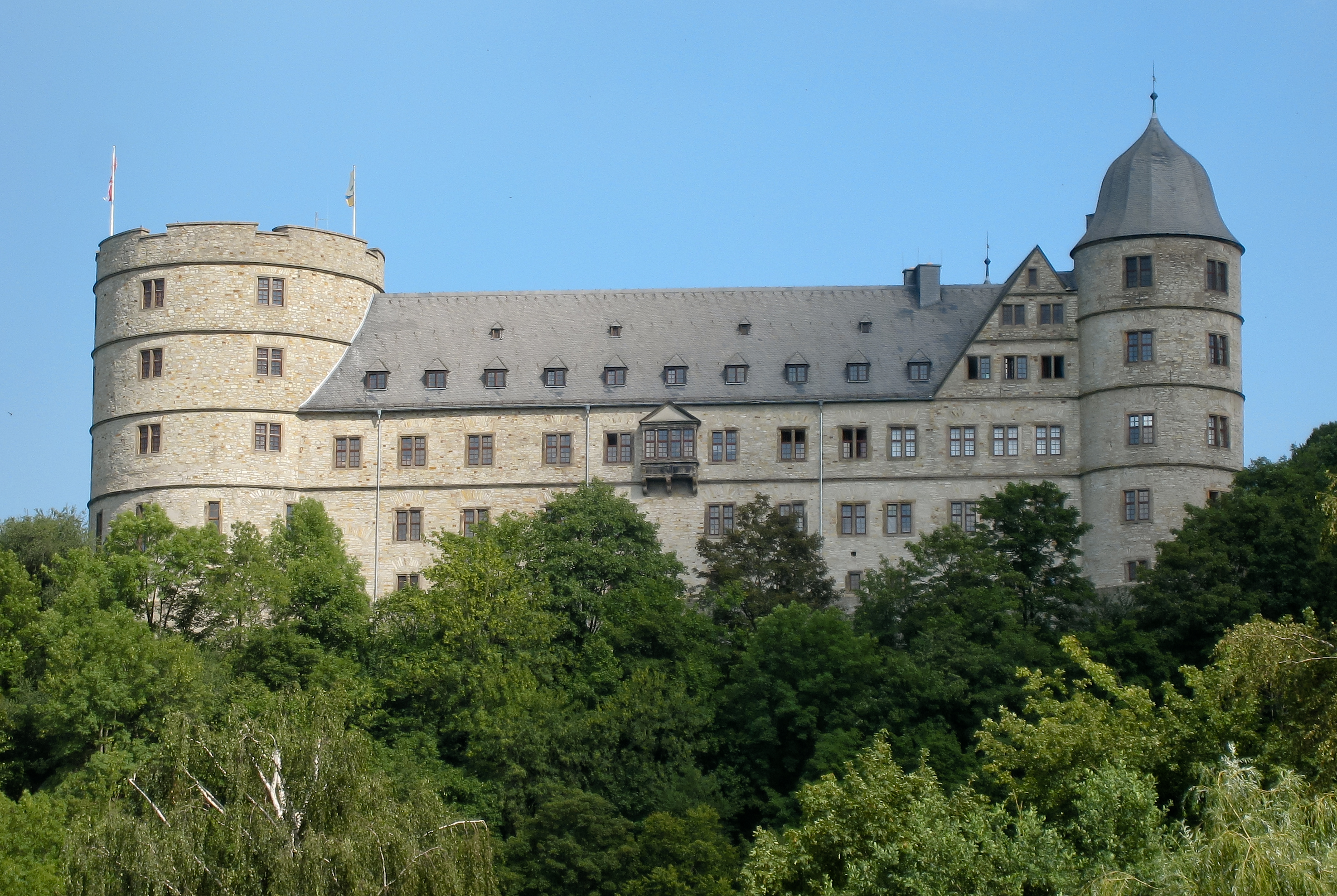
The castle of Wewelsburg, the town's landmark

The German village of Wewelsburg has been part of the town of Büren (Westphalia) in the district of Paderborn since a local-government reform in 1975. The village is above the River Alme and surrounds Wewelsburg castle on the north, east and south.
