= Wewelsburg =

Renaissance castle located in the village of Wewelsburg

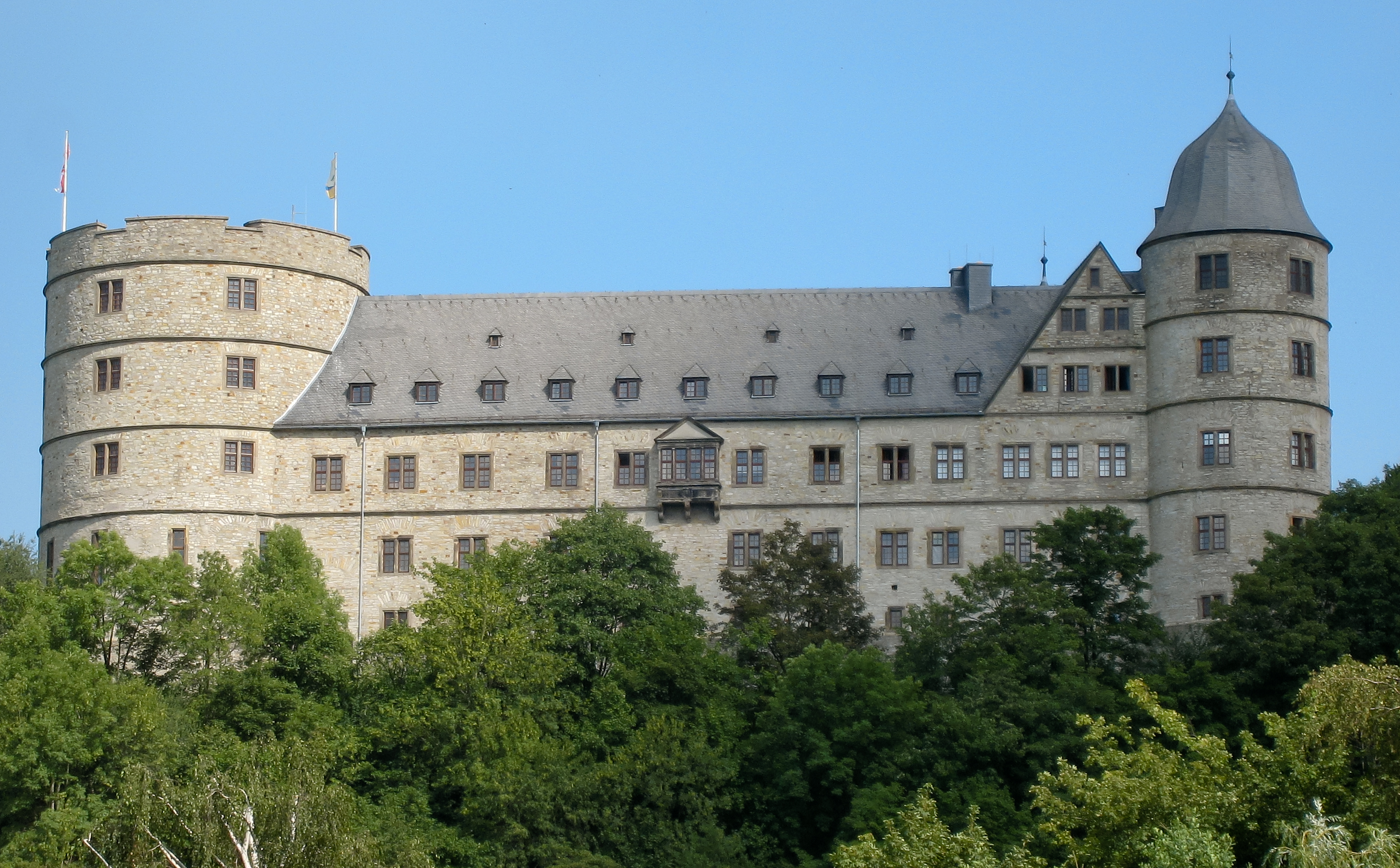
- Wewelsburg, seen from the Alme valley

- Location within North Rhine-Westphalia Location within Germany

General information
- Type: Castle
- Architectural style: Renaissance
- Location: Wewelsburg, Germany
- Coordinates: 51°36′23″N 8°39′06″E
- Current tenants: Kreismuseum Wewelsburg, Youth hostel
- Construction started: 1603
- Completed: 1609
- Renovated: 1650–1660; 19th century 1930s/1940s 1948/1949; 1973–1975
- Client: Dietrich von Fürstenberg
- Owner: District of Paderborn

Wewelsburg (German pronunciation: [ˈveːvl̩sbʊɐ̯k]) is a Renaissance castle located in the village of Wewelsburg, which is a district of the town of Büren, Westphalia, in the Landkreis of Paderborn in the northeast of North Rhine-Westphalia, Germany. The castle has a triangular layout, with three round towers connected by massive walls. After 1934 it was used by the Schutzstaffel (SS) under Heinrich Himmler and was to be expanded into a complex which would serve as the central SS cult-site.

After 1941, plans were developed to enlarge it to be the so-called "Centre of the World". In 1950 the castle reopened as a museum and youth hostel. (The youth hostel is one of the largest in Germany.) The castle today hosts the Historical Museum of the Prince Bishopric of Paderborn and the Wewelsburg 1933–1945 Memorial Museum.

== History ==
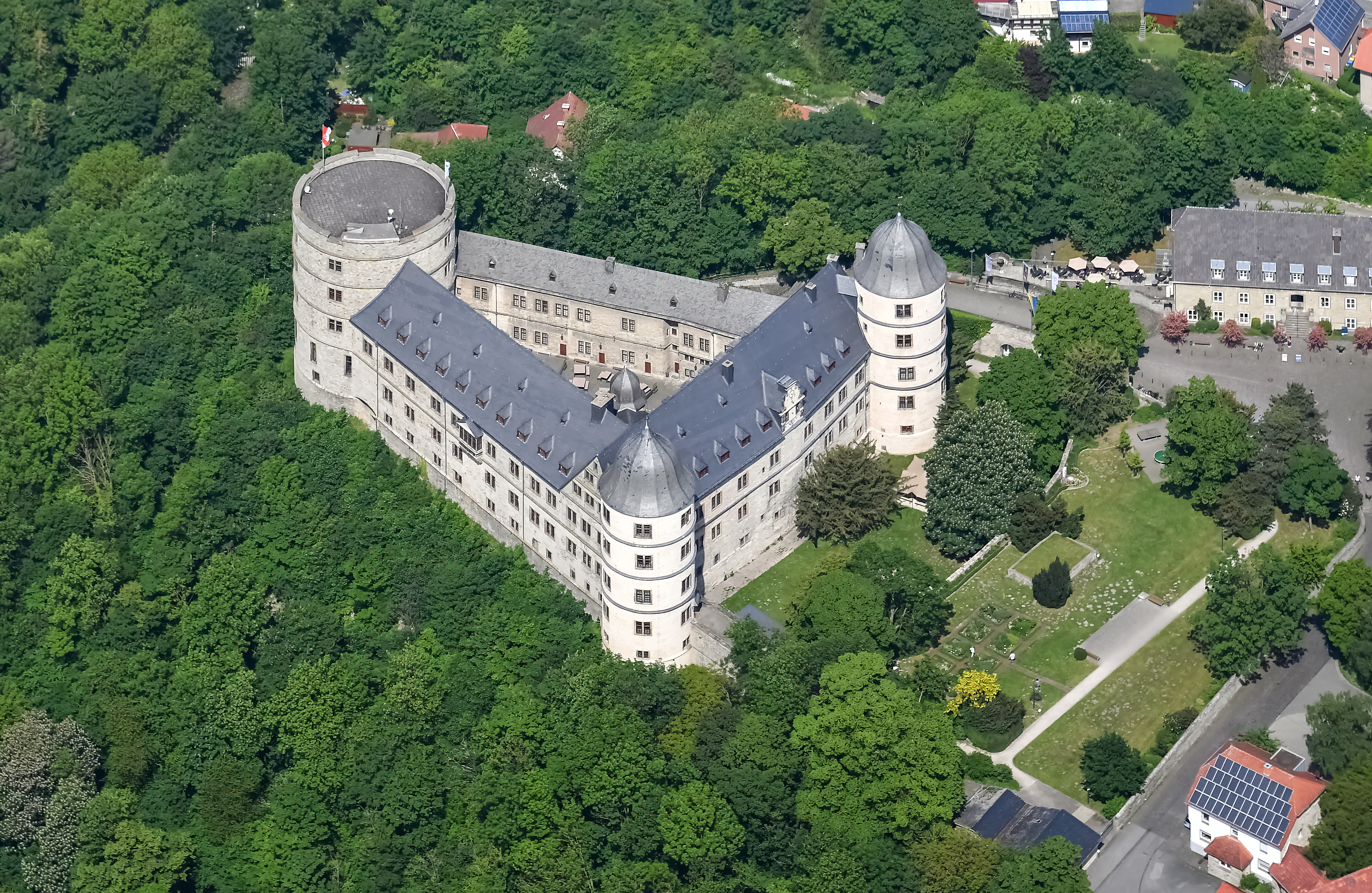
Aerial view

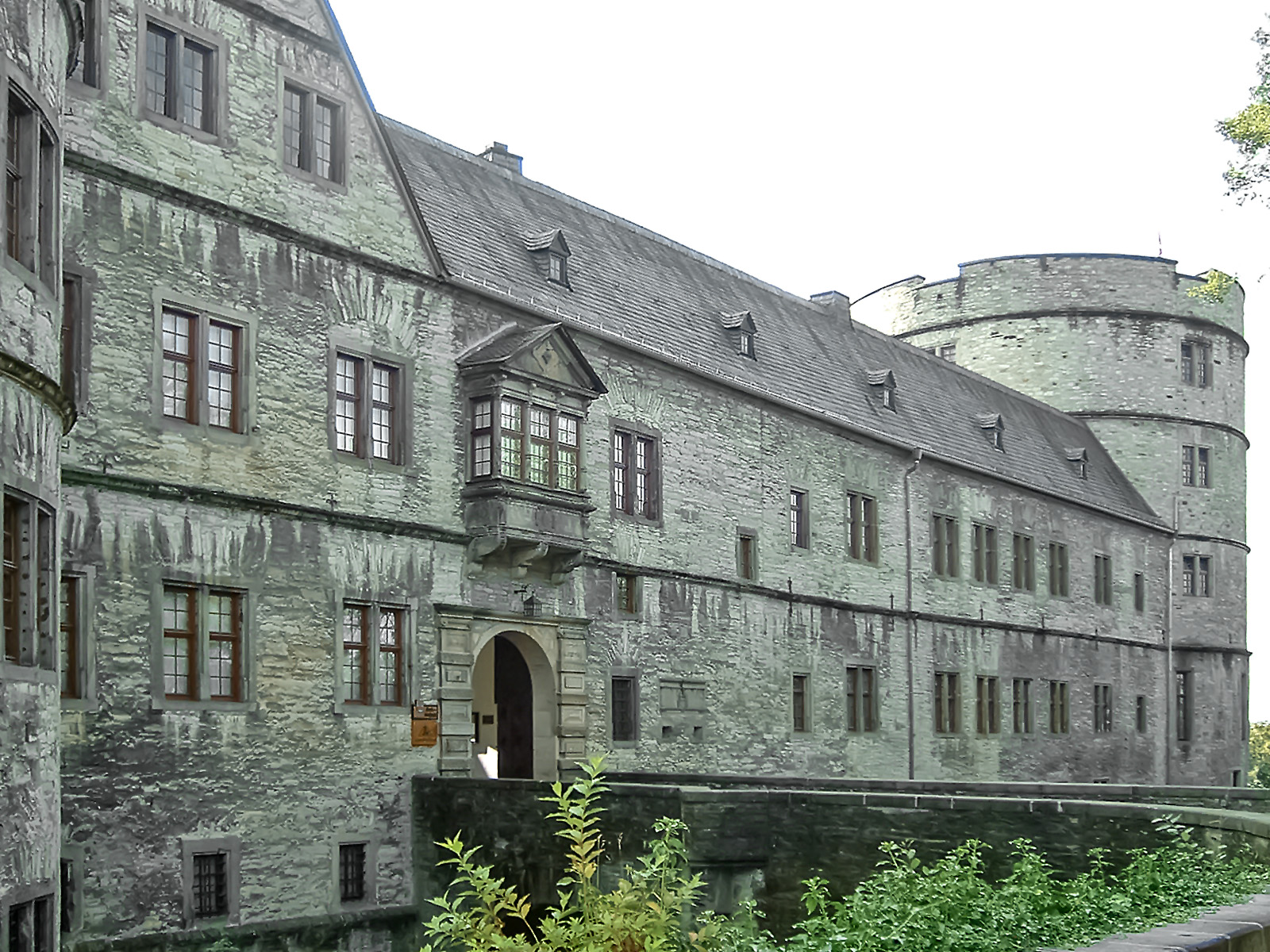
Eastern wing with access-bridge

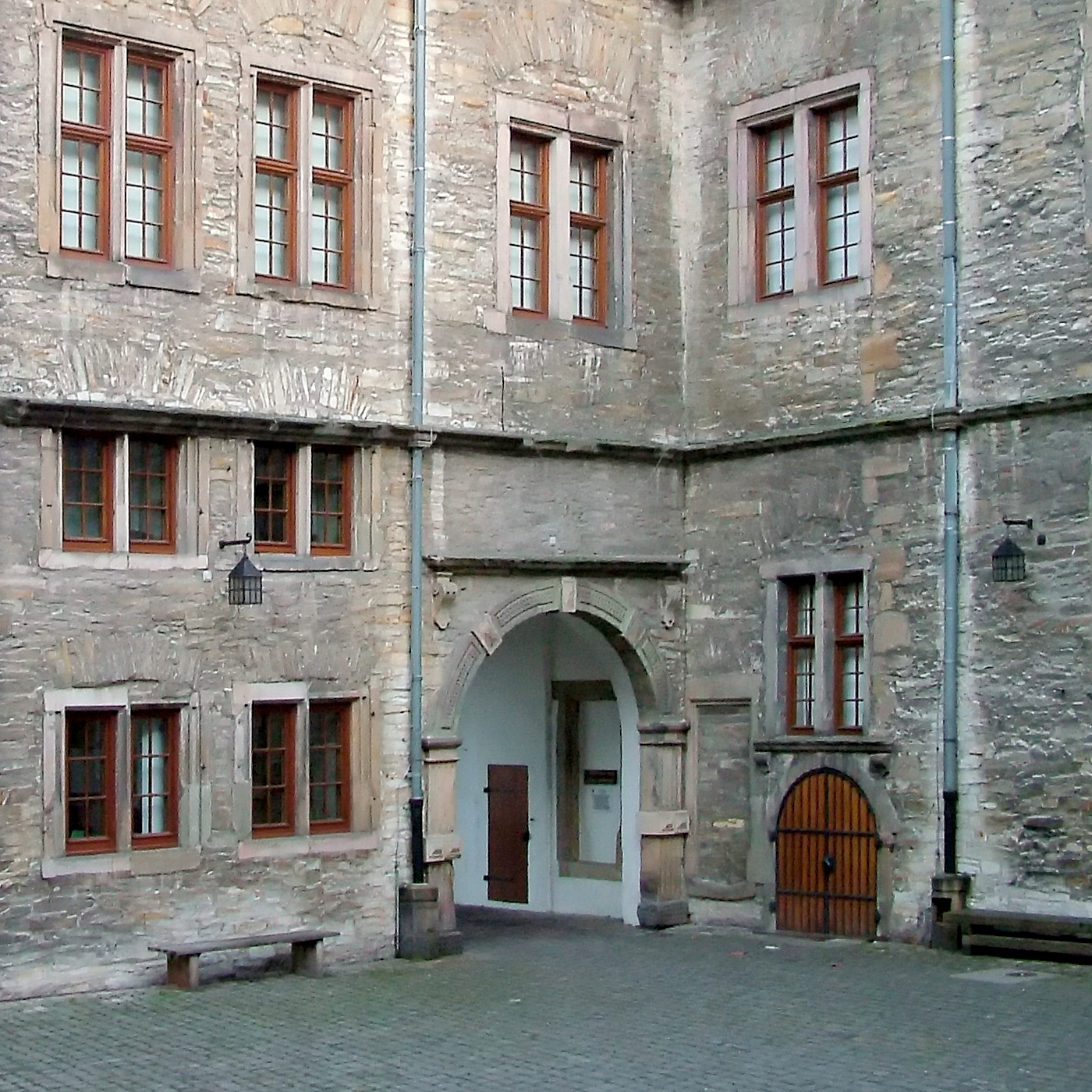
Inner courtyard

=== Earlier structures ===
Predecessor buildings existed. One of these, the Wifilisburg, was defended during the 9th and 10th centuries against the Hungarians.

Count Friedrich (Arnsberg) built another predecessor fortification. In 1123/24, after his death, peasants whom he had oppressed demolished the building. In 1301 the Count of Waldeck sold the Wewelsburg to the Prince-Bishop of Paderborn.

A document concerning this acquisition indicates that two fortresslike buildings stood on the hill, the Bürensches Haus and the Waldecksches Haus.

=== Current structure ===
==== Prince-bishops of Paderborn ====
From 1301 to 1589, the prince-bishops of Paderborn assigned the estate to various liege lords.

The masonry of both predecessor buildings was integrated in the current triangular Renaissance castle. In its current form, the Wewelsburg was built from 1603 to 1609 as secondary residence for the prince-bishops of Paderborn, at that time Dietrich von Fürstenberg. Its location is near what was then believed to be the site of the Battle of the Teutoburg Forest of 9 CE.

The Wewelsburg was taken several times during the Thirty Years' War. In 1646 it was occupied and then razed by Swedish troops, by the army commanded by General Carl Gustav Wrangel. After 1650 the mostly destroyed castle was rebuilt by Prince-Bishop Theodor Adolf von der Recke and his successor, Ferdinand von Fürstenberg. He carried out some architectural changes; the three towers of the castle were given their baroque domes.

From 1589 to 1821 the castle was the place of residence of a bursary officer (or steward). Two witch trials took place in the Wewelsburg in 1631. (There was an inquisition room in the basement next to the east tower.).

During the Seven Years' War (1756–1763) the basement rooms were probably used as a military prison.

==== Prussian state ownership ====
During the 18th and 19th centuries the castle fell progressively into ruin. In 1802, during German mediatisation, the castle came into the possession of the Prussian state. On 11 January 1815 the North Tower was gutted by a fire started by a lightning strike; only the outer walls remained. From 1832 to 1934 there was a rectory in the eastern part of the south wing of the castle.

==== District of Büren ownership ====
In 1924, the castle became the property of the district of Büren and was changed into a cultural center. By 1925 the castle had become a local museum, banqueting hall, restaurant and youth hostel.

At the end of the Twenties the North Tower again proved to be the weak point of the architecture and had to be supported by guy wires in winter 1932/33; the preservation of the castle was supported by the Association for the preservation of the Wewelsburg (Verein zur Erhaltung der Wewelsburg). After 1925 the renovation activities decreased.

== Nazi era ==
In 1932, the local head of the district authority (Landrat) ordered about seventy members of the Freiwilliger Arbeitsdienst (FAD) (voluntary labour service) to be housed at the Wewelsburg. They were unemployed and supported by the state as Notstandsarbeiter ("crisis workers"). Through the rent, the district of Büren thus hoped to recoup some of the running costs of the castle. However in early 1933 negotiations to set up a full-sized camp for 214 FAD participants failed.

Prior to the Nazi Party taking power Heinrich Himmler, as Reichsführer-SS, had decided that the SS should have a retreat at a castle "in the heartland of Hermann der Cherusker" (Armin the Cheruscian). Initially Himmler showed an interest in Burg Schwalenberg but negotiations failed in early 1933; he then visited Wewelsburg at the suggestion of a local Nazi leader, Adolf von Oeynhausen (1877–1953).

Himmler decided to buy or lease the castle on his first visit on 3 November 1933. His architect, Hermann Bartels, was able to draw on existing plans for the FAD camp for the now envisaged Reichsführerschule SS (SS Leadership School). This school was mainly intended to ensure a unified ideological training of the SS leadership and would be run by the Rasseamt of the SS.

Negotiations were difficult, however, since the Landrat of Büren was unwilling to give up control of the castle. In the first half of 1934 a 100-year lease was agreed for the symbolic annual rent of ℛℳ 1. Initial work on the school by the FAD had started in January 1934. That August, Manfred von Knobelsdorf, a brother-in-law of Walther Darré and a former professional soldier, moved in with his family as Burghauptmann. Himmler officially took over the Wewelsburg in a grand ceremony on 22 September 1934. The Völkischer Beobachter, in reporting on the event, while mentioning the Germanic and historic past of the region, emphasized the educational aspects.

In 1935 Himmler announced that the SS-castle was to be officially called SS-Schule Haus Wewelsburg (SS School, House Wewelsburg). The focus of the school was to become: "Germanische Vor- und Frühgeschichte, Volkstumskunde u. a. als Rüstzeug zur weltanschaulich-politischen Schulung" ("Germanic pre- and early history, folklore studies, etc. as a tool for ideological-political training"). Knobelsdorff envisaged a kind of Nordic academy.

There is some speculation that it was Karl Maria Wiligut who persuaded Himmler to use the castle not only as a school but also as a cult site; Wiligut allegedly was inspired by the old Westphalian legend of the Battle at the Birch Tree (Schlacht am Birkenbaum). The saga tells about a future "last battle at the birch tree", in which a "huge army from the East" is beaten decisively by the "West". During 1935 Wiligut reportedly predicted to Himmler that the Wewelsburg would be the "bastion". Himmler expected a big conflict between Asia and Europe.

=== Wewelsburg SS School ===
Knobelsdorf led the SS School, House Wewelsburg but very quickly the focus of activity shifted away from schooling the SS leadership in a broad set of ideological fields to something much narrower. In fact work concentrated more on conducting basic pseudo-scientific research in the fields of Germanic pre- and early history, medieval history, folklore and genealogy (Sippenforschung), all intended to provide the underpinnings for the racial teachings of the SS. A scientific library was established. But even the first plans by Bartels from early 1934 did not show any large-scale classrooms, only smaller cell-like rooms for individual study. Among those active at the Wewelsburg was Wilhelm Teudt.

==== Fields of activity ====
Wewelsburg Castle was also a centre for archaeological excavations in the region. Fields of activity included study of prehistory and ancient history (directed by Wilhelm Jordan, who led excavations in the region), study of medieval history and folklife (directed by Karlernst Lasch from March 1935), build-up of the "Library of the Schutzstaffel in Wewelsburg" (directed by Dr. Hans Peter des Coudres), and strengthening the National Socialist worldview in the village of Wewelsburg (directed by Walter Franzius).

This latter activity included such work as renovation of a timbered house in the center of the village of Wewelsburg – the "Ottens Hof" – between 1935 and 1937 for use as a village community center. Franzius also undertook various other architectural tasks.

==== Crew ====
The castle crew consisted of members of all SS branches, the "General SS" ("Allgemeine SS"), the police and the "Armed SS" ("Waffen-SS"). Also working at the castle were proponents of a kind of SS esotericism consisting of Germanic mysticism, an ancestor cult, worship of runes, and racial doctrines. Himmler, for example, adapted the idea of the Grail to create a heathen mystery for the SS.

==== Redesign and reconstruction ====
No proof exists that Himmler wanted a Grail castle, but redesign of the castle by the SS referred to certain characters in the legends of the Grail: for example, one of the arranged study rooms was named Gral ("Grail"), and others, König Artus ("King Arthur"), König Heinrich ("King Henry", referring to Henry the Fowler to whom Himmler claimed a connection), Heinrich der Löwe ("Henry the Lion"), Widukind, Christoph Kolumbus ("Christopher Columbus"), Arier ("Aryan"), Jahrlauf ("course of the seasons"), Runen ("runes"), Westfalen ("Westphalia"), Deutscher Orden ("Teutonic Order"), Reichsführerzimmer ("Room of the Empire's Leader(s)"; Reichsführer-SS, or "the Reich's Leader of the SS" was Himmler's title), Fridericus (probably in reference to Frederick II of Prussia), tolle Christian ("Christian the Great", probably referring to Christian the Younger of Brunswick, Bishop of Halberstadt), and Deutsche Sprache ("German language"). In addition to these study rooms, the SS created guest rooms, a dining room, an auditorium, a canteen kitchen, and a photographic laboratory with an archive.

Oak was used to panel and furnish these rooms, though (according to contemporary witnesses) only sparingly. All interior decoration was shaped by an SS sensibility in art and culture; the preferred elements of design were based on runes, swastikas, and Germanically interpreted Sinnzeichen (sense characters). Tableware, decorated with runes and Germanic symbols of salvation, was manufactured specifically for Wewelsburg Castle, and Himmler's private collection of weapons was housed in the castle.

In 1934, the eastern castle bridge was built and the castle moat lowered. The exterior plaster was removed to make the building look more castle-like. The following year, a smithy was established on the ground floor of the North Tower for manufacture of the wrought-iron interior decoration of the castle. The western and southern wings of the castle were rebuilt between 1934 and 1938; the eastern, between 1936 and 1938. The first new building, the guardhouse (Wachgebäude), was constructed next to the castle in 1937. An SS sentry post and a small circular location (Rondell) were placed next to the guardhouse, as was a no longer extant SS staff building (SS-Stabsgebäude). The North Tower was strengthened and rebuilt between 1938 and 1943.

From 1939, the castle was also furnished with miscellaneous objects of art, including prehistoric objects (chiefly arranged by the teaching and research group Das Ahnenerbe), objects of past historical eras, and works of contemporary sculptors and painters (mainly works by such artists as Karl Diebitsch, Wolfgang Willrich, and Hans Lohbeck – that is, art in line with the aesthetics of National Socialism).

==== Directors ====
The first commandant of the castle (Burghauptmann von Wewelsburg), from August 1934, was SS-Obersturmbannführer (Lieutenant Colonel) Manfred von Knobelsdorff. He was partial to Karl Maria Wiligut's religious theories. The opinion of other SS-scientists about Wiligut were absolutely negative. SS-Obersturmbannfuhrer von Knobelsdorff was succeeded by Siegfried Taubert on 30 January 1938. Because Taubert was consigned to various other tasks he was absent from the castle for longer periods.

==== Other activities ====
So-called "SS-marriage-consecrations" (SS-Eheweihen) took place at the castle.

Since 1936 Himmler (who was often at the castle) had increasingly wanted to expand the Wewelsburg to be a representative and ideological center of the SS Order. Consequently, although it had been originally intended to be an educational training center, during the 1930s increasing measures were taken to transform the castle into an isolated central meeting place for the highest-ranking SS-officers.

==== Financing ====
For financing the project, Himmler founded in 1936 the "Gesellschaft zur Förderung und Pflege deutscher Kulturdenkmäler e.V." (Association for the advancement and maintenance of German cultural relics (registered association)) and assigned the association as building developer. In contrast to the SS, the association was allowed to receive donations and loans. Until 1943, the project cost 15 million ℛ︁ℳ︁.

==== Bans on visits and publicity ====
On 6 November 1935, Himmler forbade visiting the castle without express permission. In 1939 he further forbade publishing anything about the castle.

==== Construction and modifications after 1938 ====
After the Freiwilliger Arbeitsdienst (the "FAD", "Voluntary Labour Service") ceased work on Wewelsburg, the Reichsarbeitsdienst (the "RAD", "Reich Labour Service") carried out modifications to the castle; but in 1938, the RAD was relocated to the "Westwall" (Siegfried Line). Between 1939 and 1943, prisoners from the Sachsenhausen and Niederhagen concentration camps were used as labourers to perform much of the construction work on Wewelsburg, under the design of architect Hermann Bartels. However, by a decree of 13 January 1943, all building projects which were unimportant for the war – including the Wewelsburg – had to be stopped.

In 1938, after Reichskristallnacht, 17 Jews from Salzkotten, ten kilometers (about six miles) distant, were held in the dungeon of the Wewelsburg before transportation to the Buchenwald concentration camp.

In the middle of the 1930s, Himmler had a private safe mounted in the basement of the west tower. Only the commandant of the castle knew about it. The whereabouts of its content after the Second World War is unclear.

==== Meetings of SS-Leaders ====
Swearing-in ceremonies were planned at the castle. Meetings of SS-Gruppenführer (equivalent to lieutenant-generals) at so called "spring conferences" were planned since 1939. Some talks probably took place at Wewelsburg Castle; the only documented Gruppenführers' meeting was held from 12 to 15 June 1941 – one week before the beginning of Operation Barbarossa. The highest ranking SS-officers, who planned the SS operation in the Soviet Union or who were intended to be used for the operation, were called up by Himmler. Concrete decisions were not made. The meeting's purpose was the ideological preparation of the attendant SS leaders for the campaign. Another source mentions three or four ceremonies a year of SS leaders which took place at the castle.

Towards the end of the war, Himmler ordered that Wewelsburg Castle should become the Reichshaus der SS-Gruppenführer (Reich-House of the SS-Gruppenführer).

=== Death's head rings ===
In 1938, Himmler ordered the return of all death's head rings (German: Totenkopfringe) of dead SS-men and officers. They were to be stored in a chest in the castle. This was to symbolize the ongoing membership of the deceased in the SS-Order. The whereabouts of the approximately 11,500 rings after the Second World War is unknown.

=== SS plans ===
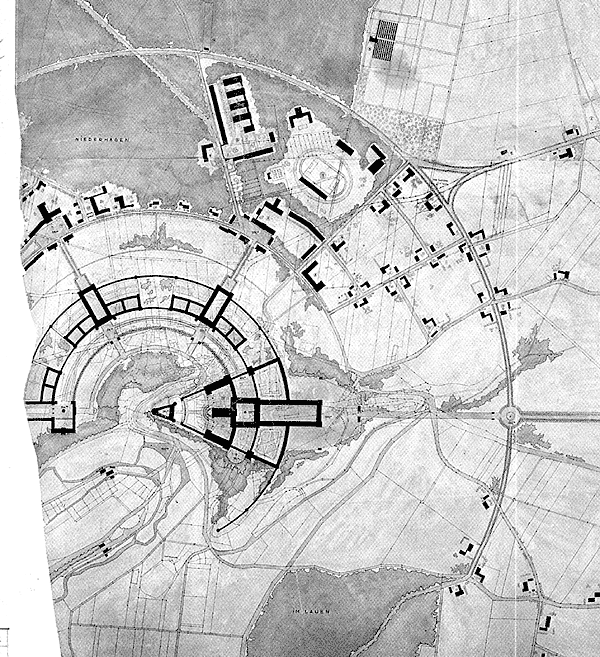
SS blueprint for the planned construction of the area around Wewelsburg. The small triangle in the center of the circle, forming the tip of the "spear", is Wewelsburg.

Himmler's plans included making it the "center of the new world" ("Zentrum der neuen Welt") following the "final victory". The monumental estate was never realized; only detailed plans and models exist. The installation of a 15 to 18-meter-high wall in the shape of a three-quarter circle with 18 towers including the actual castle area centred on the North Tower of the castle, 860 m in diameter, was planned. The real purpose of the project was never clearly defined. Inside of this castle area, buildings were planned for the exclusive purposes of the Reichsführung-SS (Reich Leadership-SS).

The main road of an SS village was also to be centred on the North Tower of the castle with a diameter of 1270 m. This road was to be connected with three radial roads and gates with the castle area. The residential area was to be placed in the northwest, the centre of the village in the north, and the SS-barracks in the west of the castle area; between the barracks and village a villa colony for higher SS-leaders; in the southwest farmsteads.

In the architectural plans from 1941, the estate had the shape of a spear pointing towards the north; the 2 km long access avenue with four tree rows road looks like a spear shaft with an access to the Rhynern – Kassel Reichsautobahn (freeway) to the south. The plan from 1944 shows the castle as the top of a triangular estate surrounded by further buildings. The plans also included a "Hall of the High Court of the SS" (Saal des Hohen Gerichtes der SS), streets, parkways, magnificent buildings, a dam with a power plant, freeway accesses and an airport.

From 1941 on, (after Hitler's successful military campaigns against Poland and France) the architects called the complex the "Center of the World". It was to be finished within twenty years. The complex was to be a center of the "species-appropriate religion" (artgemäße Religion) and a representative estate for the SS-Führerkorps (SS leader corps). If the plans had been realized, the entire village of Wewelsburg and adjacent villages would have disappeared. The population was to be resettled. The valley was to be flooded. 250 million Reichsmark were budgeted for the estate.

=== North Tower ===
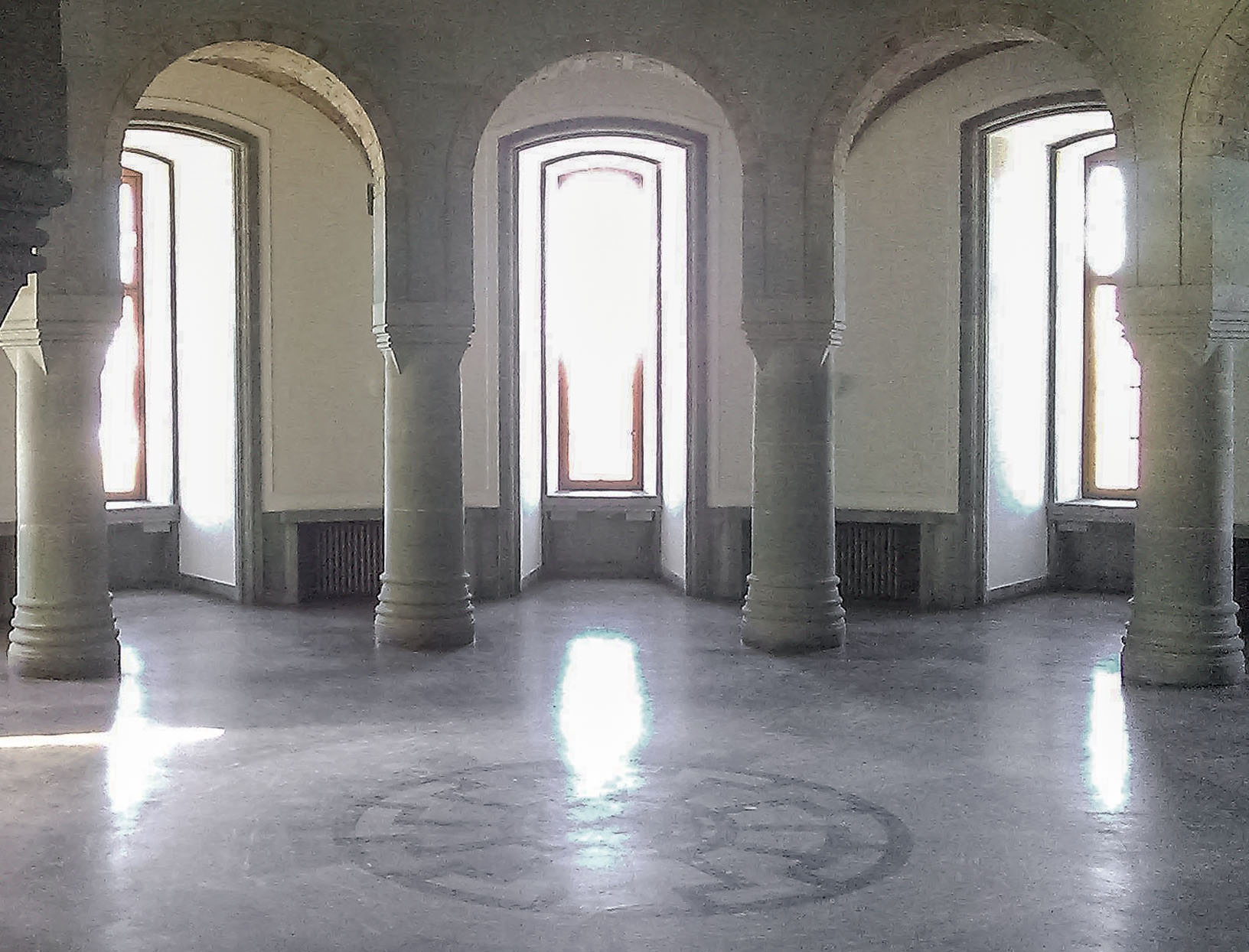
Obergruppenführersaal (SS Generals' Hall), with the so-called "Black Sun" on the hall floor

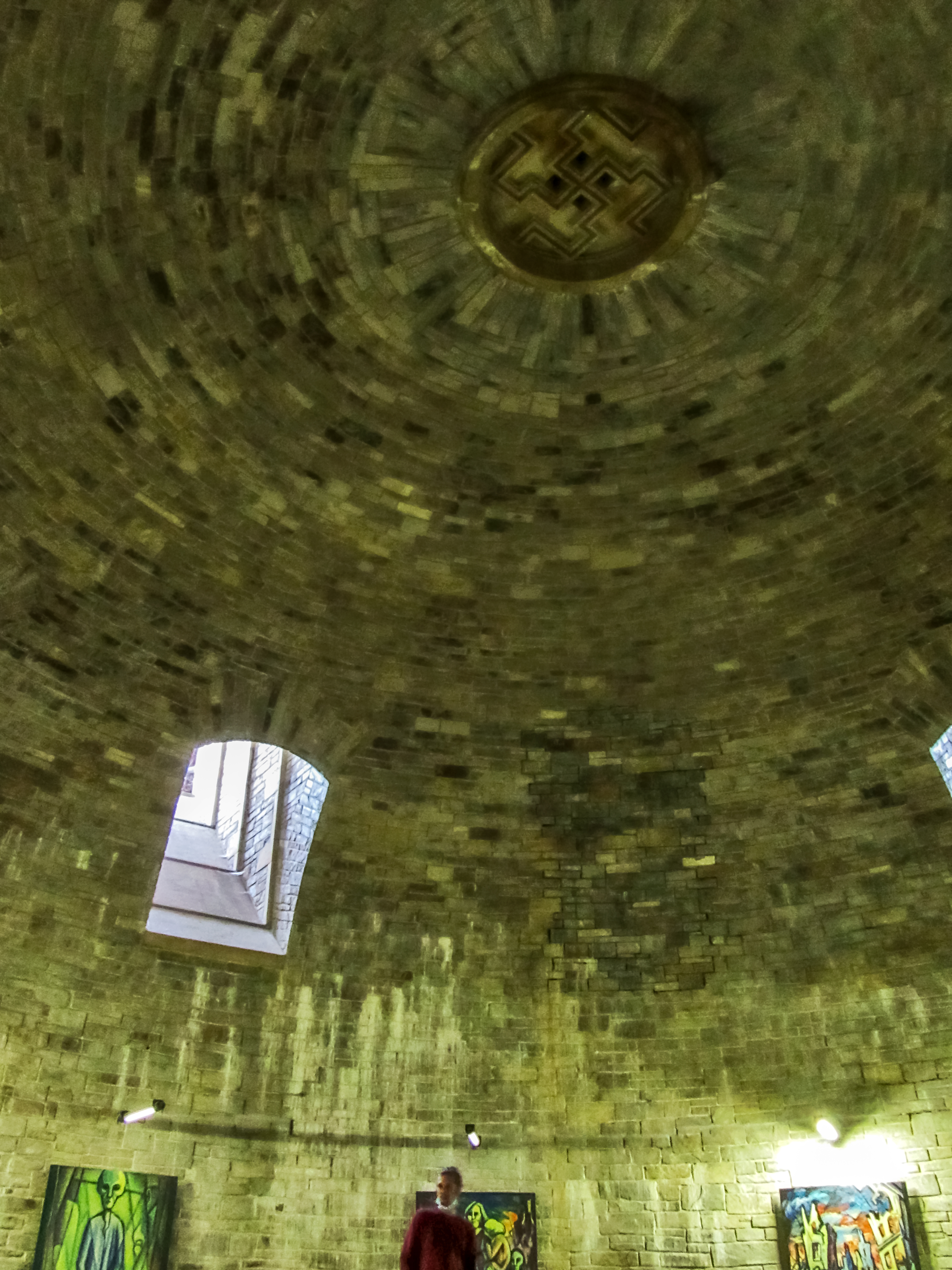
The Crypt or ritual dungeon in the north tower in Wewelsburg Castle. The Swastika symbol in the capstone of the ceiling is still present.

Inside the North Tower, two mythologic designed rooms were created (1938–1943):

The Obergruppenführersaal (SS Generals' Hall) and the Gruft (vault). Their ceilings were cast in concrete and faced with natural stone. On the upper floors a further hall was planned. The axis of this tower was to be the actual "Center of the World" (Mittelpunkt der Welt). A preparation for an eternal flame in the vault, a swastika ornament in its zenith, and the so-called "Black Sun" symbol embedded in the floor of the "Obergruppenführersaal" lie on this axis. Although both rooms appear to have a ceremonial purpose, nothing is known about if, or how, the rooms were ever used.

The upper floors were to be completed as a multi-storied hall with a big dome. It was to be a prestigious meeting hall for the entire corps of the SS-Gruppenführer. This room was only planned. In order to realize the hall the upper half of the tower was dismantled in winter 1941/42.

==== Obergruppenführersaal ====
On the ground floor the Obergruppenführersaal (literally translated: Upper-Group-Leaders-Hall, referring to the original twelve highest ranking SS-generals, called Obergruppenführer), a hall with twelve columns joined by a groined vault, twelve window- and door-niches and eight longitudinal windows was created. The room was almost finished; the rebuilding work stopped in 1943. Assumedly it was to serve as a representative hall for the SS-Obergruppenführer. In the centre of the marbled whitish/grayish floor a dark green sun wheel (Sonnenrad) is embedded. The axis of the sun wheel consisted of a circular plate of pure gold, which was to symbolize the center of the castle and thus the entire "Germanic world empire".

Since the 1990s, the ornament has been called the "Black Sun" occasionally. It is not known if the SS had a special name for the ornament nor if they attributed a special meaning to it. Possibly the sun wheel had a relation to the Germanic light- and sun-mysticism which was propagated by the SS. Today, it is used as a symbol in Neo-Nazism and in a variety of subcultures. However, the ornament has only been linked to the esoteric neo-Nazi concept of the Black Sun after 1991. The Latin inscription above the entrance "Domus mea domus orationis vocabitur" ("My house shall be called a house of prayer") reminds of the prince-episcopalian chapel which was originally located on the ground floor of the tower.

==== Vault ====
Where a primary cistern was originally located, a vault after the model of Mycenaean domed tombs was hewn into the rock, possibly to serve as some kind of commemoration of the dead. The room is unfinished. The floor was lowered 4.80 meters. The foundation of the tower was firmed with concrete, and a gas pipe leading to the centre was embedded, suggesting that an eternal flame was probably planned for the centre of this space. Twelve pedestals were placed around the perimeter, each with a wall niche above it; the purpose is unknown.

=== Blasting operation ===
When the "final victory" failed to materialize, the castle commander (or Burghauptmann), SS General Siegfried Taubert, fled on 30 March 1945 as the U.S. 3rd Armored Division closed in on the Paderborn area in the final phases of the war. Meanwhile, at his headquarters in Brenzlau, Himmler ordered adjutant SS Major Heinz Macher, with 15 of his men, to destroy the Wewelsburg. This took place on Saturday 31 March only three days before the 83rd Armored Reconnaissance Battalion, 3rd Armored Division seized the grounds after reports from a nearby Bürgermeister that "SS men had set fire to their barracks in the castle, changed into civilian clothes and fled."

Because Macher's company ran out of explosives, they placed tank mines only in the unimportant southeast tower, the guard-building and the SS-cadre-building which was completely destroyed. The castle was set on fire and – according to information of the village citizens – the castle was open to looting.

=== Members ===
- Heinrich Himmler: Aegis
- Erich Schupping: Commandant
- Siegfried Taubert: Commandant
- Karl Elstermann von Elster Stabsführer: replaced by Paul Hübner
- Walter Muller: Hauptsturmführer
- Josef Schneid: Hauptsturmführer also known as Pepi
- Walter Franzius: architect brought on board in October 1935
- Karl Lasch
- Dr Hans-Peter de Courdes: until May 1939
- Dr Bernhard Frank: SS Commander of the Obersalzberg
- Dr Heinrich Hagel (physician): Obersturmbannführer
- Wilhelm Jordan
- Elfriede Wippermann

=== Legends and interpretations ===
- According to rumours, the Death's Head Rings were to be buried in the vault. The vault, allegedly dubbed the "Himmler Crypt", was (allegedly) dedicated to Heinrich I, founder and first king of the medieval German state (see East Francia), of whom Himmler reportedly believed himself to be the reincarnation and where he hoped to be interred after his death. This assertion is unproven. In Himmler's opinion, Heinrich I protected Germany from invaders from the "East", as popularized in Richard Wagner's Lohengrin opera.
- Leading representatives of the Third Reich were fascinated by the story of the "Holy Grail". Hitler admired Richard Wagner's operas Lohengrin and Parsifal. Hitler himself never visited the castle.
- Himmler reportedly imagined the castle as a focus for the rebirth of the Knights of the Round Table and appointed twelve SS officers as his followers, who would gather at various rooms throughout the castle and perform unknown neo-Paganistic and possibly neo-Gnostic rites. The SS had twelve main departments (SS-Hauptämter) with twelve leaders. The number twelve plays a major role in the design of the North Tower: twelve pedestals in the vault, twelve pillars and niches in the "Obergruppenführersaal", and twelve spokes of the sun wheel. In the study on ancient sense characters during the Third Reich, the sun in general was interpreted as "the strongest and most visible expression of God", the number twelve as documented for "the things of the target and the completion". With reference to the number 12 in their studies on Germanic mythology a relation was drawn to "the twelve Æsir of divine kind who have (according to the Edda) twelve domiciles and twelve stallions" and to the "twelve rivers which flow from the fountain Hwergelmir in Niflheim".

Quote of former SS-General Karl Wolff referring to the Obergruppenführersaal: "This was a part of the myth which was to be introduced here. These are the twelve compartments (Note: German original sound record: "Postamente": this could refer to the twelve columns; there is also speculation about twelve heraldic emblems for the twelve leading SS Generals which were to be placed inside the hall), they were created according to mystic-confused things with which Himmler liked to play, of the Round Table of King Arthur. In fact we were twelve main department leaders (Hauptamtchefs) who represented equally next to each other their service areas because Himmler didn't have the courage to appoint a Deputy-Reichsführer-SS or a Deputy Chief of the German police."

- Allegedly the "Obergruppenführersaal" has similarities with the Mausoleum of Theodoric in Ravenna
- When one of the officers died, his ashes would be interred in the castle. There is speculation that the urns of dead SS leaders would have been placed on the pedestals in the vault. The vault is also named "consecration-hall" (Weihehalle).
- The exact meaning of the vault is unknown. Nevertheless, the room is significant for the quasi-religious aspects of National Socialism – especially the ancestral cult. A possible interpretation of the symbolic character of the eternal flame in general according to solemn beliefs which had established during the NS-era especially in SS circles: in the fire they wanted to feel the soul of ancestors. The symbol of the eternal flame stood for the aspiration of the ancestral soul from which man arises at his birth and which he reenters at his death. Consecration-sites and -events suggested the immortality of the people's soul. By sacral-architecture and spectacular mass-events the subconsciousness of the masses was influenced by pseudo-religious ideas. The two cult rooms inside the North Tower were built to deepen the own "mission".
- In 1938, Siegfried Taubert was in charge of developing the castle, when Himmler inquired about the cost of installing a planetarium. To round off the subjects taught at the Wewelsburg SS school a teacher was sought who should draw cross-connections between astronomy and history and the folklife of the ancestors so that the historical and ideological schooling was to be enhanced and deepened by the "cosmic view" (kosmische Schau).

=== Niederhagen Camp ===
Just offsite of Wewelsburg was the smallest German KZ, Niederhagen prison and labour camp. Begun on June 17, 1940, the camp was completed the following year and named after Niederhagen Forest, the name Himmler had given to the forest outside the castle several years earlier.

It began with 480 prisoners from Sachsenhausen, and grew to 1,200, consisting chiefly of Soviet POWs and captured foreign labourers shipped to Germany, although early in its life it was also a gathering point for Jehovah's Witness prisoners. Correspondingly, a large percentage of the concentration camp inmates at Niederhagen who were working on the Wewelsburg Castle were indeed Jehovah's Witnesses, perhaps the only place where they constituted the core KZ population. During the SS's December 1942 Korherr Report, it was reported to have only housed 12 Jews, all of whom had died.

Of the 3,900 prisoners held during the camp's existence, 1,285 died of typhus and 56 were formally executed. In August 1942, the Allies began deciphering death tolls transmitted from the camps; Niederhagen had reported 21 deaths for that month. The camp was dissolved in 1943 with most of the prisoners resettled in Buchenwald, though several dozen prisoners remained behind, housed directly in Wewelsburg.

SS-Hauptsturmführer Adolf Haas, who had overseen the camp from its beginning, was transferred to a command position at Bergen-Belsen, while Schutzhaftlagerführer Wolfgang Plaul was transferred to Buchenwald. SS-Untersturmführer Hermann Michl had last been recorded at the camp in 1942, and later appeared at the Riga Ghetto.

== Post-war ==
In 1948/49, the castle was restored. On 29 June 1950, the castle was reopened as a museum and youth hostel, while the Niederhagen kitchen had been renovated into a village fire station.

In 1973, a two-year project was begun to restore the North Tower. Due to a local government reform the Wewelsburg became property of the district of Paderborn in 1975.

By 1977, it had been decided to restore the entire site as a war monument. It opened on 20 March 1982 under the name Wewelsburg 1933-1945: Kult- und Terrorstätte der SS in the former SS guard house in the castle forecourt. Several Niederhagen camp survivors were present.

In 1996, the Historical Museum of the Bishopric of Paderborn (Historisches Museum des Hochstifts Paderborn) opened in the east- and south-wings. The museum documents the history of the "Hochstift Paderborn" (Bishopric of Paderborn) which was one of territories of the Holy Roman Empire.

In 2000, a memorial was built in honour of the deceased Niederhagen prisoners; four years later, the Kreismuseum Wewelsburg was granted DM 29,400 for restoring and moving the remnants of the Niederhagen camp, as well as producing an educational film on the Ukrainian and Russian prisoners who were housed there. In 2006 and 2007, it hosted the annual Internacia Seminario, a meeting of Esperanto youth.

The Youth hostel Wewelsburg, with 218 beds, is located in the west wing of the castle. The Historical Museum of the Prince Bishopric of Paderborn is located in the south and east wings.

In 2010, the museum's contemporary history department was reopened as "Wewelsburg 1933–1945 Memorial Museum". The new permanent exhibition "Ideology and terror of the SS" now presents the history of the Schutzstaffel's activities in Wewelsburg within the broader context of the SS as a whole. A news item stated that the exhibition "dubbed the world's first dedicated entirely to the dreaded Schutzstaffel, charts its growth from Hitler's elite guard to a band of a million men who committed unspeakable crimes across Europe. A discussion of tours of the castle on the Expedia web site in 2020 included this information: "...head to the former guardhouse in the forecourt for the Wewelsburg 1933-1945 Memorial Museum. Browse the free and fascinating exhibit Ideology and Terror of the SS". A fee applied to tour the castle, however.

The Kreismuseum Wewelsburg website stated that the exhibition "utilises a comprehensive media concept as well as classical image and text elements. Many qualitative, original exhibits such as Heinrich Himmler’s pocket calendar, concentration camp barrack walls and prisoners’ clothing are on display."

== See also ==
- Chiemsee Cauldron
- Heinz Macher
- Nazi architecture
- Nazism and occultism
- Ordensburg Vogelsang
