= 1990–91 Borussia Dortmund season =

80th season in existence of Borussia Dortmund

Borussia Dortmund
1990–91 season
- Manager: Horst Köppel
- Stadium: Westfalenstadion
- Bundesliga: 10nd
- DFB-Pokal: Third round
- Top goalscorer: Michael Rummenigge (8 goals)

The 1990–91 Borussia Dortmund season was the 79th season in the club's history and the 15th season since promotion from 2. Bundesliga in 1976. Borussia finished tenth in the league behind Borussia Mönchengladbach.

== Competitions ==
=== Overview ===
Competition	First match	Last match	Starting round	Final position	Record							
Competition	First match	Last match	Starting round	Final position	Pld	W	D	L	GF	GA	GD	Win %
Bundesliga	8 August 1990	15 June 1991	Matchday 1	10th	34	10	14	10	46	57	−11	29.41
UEFA Cup	18 September 1990	12 December 1990	First round	Third round	6	5	0	1	10	2	+8	83.33
Total					40	15	14	11	56	59	−3	37.50

Source: Competitions

=== Bundesliga ===
==== League table ====
Pos	Team	Pld	W	D	L	GF	GA	GD	Pts
8	Bayer Leverkusen	34	11	13	10	47	46	+1	35
9	Borussia Mönchengladbach	34	9	17	8	49	54	−5	35
10	Borussia Dortmund	34	10	14	10	46	57	−11	34
11	SG Wattenscheid 09	34	9	15	10	42	51	−9	33
12	Fortuna Düsseldorf	34	11	10	13	40	49	−9	32

Source: www.dfb.de
Rules for classification: 1) points; 2) goal difference; 3) number of goals scored.
The league expanded to 20 teams for the 1991–92 season because of the integration of the two best East German Oberliga teams due to German reunification.

==== Matches ====
8 August 1990 1	Borussia Dortmund	0–3	VfB Stuttgart	Dortmund
20:00			38' Fritz Walter; 45' Fritz Walter; 78' Fritz Walter	Stadium: Westfalenstadion; Attendance: 41,034; Referee: Manfred Harder

18 August 1990 2	Karlsruher SC	1–2	Borussia Dortmund	Karlsruhe
15:30	89' Srećko Bogdan		40' Michael Rummenigge; 44' Frank Mill	Stadium: Wildparkstadion; Attendance: 24,000; Referee: Werner Föckler

24 August 1990 3	Borussia Dortmund	0–2	1. FC Kaiserslautern	Dortmund
20:00			8' Thomas Helmer (OG); 84' Demir Hotić	Stadium: Westfalenstadion; Attendance: 35,032; Referee: Wolf-Günter Wiesel

2 September 1990 4	Fortuna Düsseldorf	0–0	Borussia Dortmund	Düsseldorf
19:00				Stadium: Rheinstadion; Attendance: 10,000; Referee: Eugen Strigel

7 September 1990 5	Borussia Dortmund	1–0	VfL Bochum	Dortmund
20:00	85' Murdo MacLeod			Stadium: Westfalenstadion; Attendance: 35,789; Referee: Hans-Joachim Osmers

15 September 1990 6	Werder Bremen	1–1	Borussia Dortmund	Bremen
15:30	39' Frank Neubarth		32' Frank Mill	Stadium: Weserstadion; Attendance: 18,660; Referee: Hans-Peter Dellwing

22 September 1990 7	Borussia Dortmund	1–1	Borussia Mönchengladbach	Dortmund
15:30	17' Michael Lusch		29' Hans-Jörg Criens	Stadium: Westfalenstadion; Attendance: 39,455; Referee: Aron Schmidhuber

29 September 1990 8	1. FC Köln	0–1	Borussia Dortmund	Cologne
15:30			35' Michael Lusch	Stadium: Müngersdorfer Stadion; Attendance: 20,000; Referee: Hans Fux

6 October 1990 9	Borussia Dortmund	1–1	Hamburger SV	Dortmund
15:30	52' Flemming Povlsen		29' Thomas Doll	Stadium: Westfalenstadion; Attendance: 39,451; Referee: Manfred Amerell

13 October 1990 10	Eintracht Frankfurt	3–1	Borussia Dortmund	Frankfurt am Main
15:30	50' Tony Yeboah; 67' Andreas Möller; 72' Heinz Gründel		84' Stefan Sterath	Stadium: Waldstadion; Attendance: 29,000; Referee: Gerhard Theobald

19 October 1990 11	SG Wattenscheid 09	1–1	Borussia Dortmund	Bochum
20:00	80' Frank Hartmann		68' Michael Zorc	Stadium: Lohrheidestadion; Attendance: 43,200; Referee: Hermann Albrecht

27 October 1990 12	Borussia Dortmund	3–1	Hertha BSC	Dortmund
15:30	70' Frank Mill; 81' Michael Zorc (P); 90' Günter Kutowski		7' Theo Gries	Stadium: Westfalenstadion; Attendance: 31,482; Referee: Hans-Jürgen Kasper

10 November 1990 13	Bayern Munich	2–3	Borussia Dortmund	Munich
15:30	70' Stefan Efferberg; 90' Olaf Thon		79' Thomas Helmer; 81' Jürgen Wegmann; 85' Flemming Povlsen	Stadium: Olympiastadion; Attendance: 29,000; Referee: Alfons Berg

16 November 1990 14	Borussia Dortmund	0–2	1. FC Nürnberg	Dortmund
20:00			67' Jörg Dittwar (P); 86' Marc Oechler	Stadium: Westfalenstadion; Attendance: 33,560; Referee: Wolfgang Mierswa

24 November 1990 15	Bayer 05 Uerdingen	1–3	Borussia Dortmund	Krefeld
15:30	83' Jan Bartram		49' Michael Rummenigge; 80' Jürgen Wegmann; 88' Flemming Povtsen	Stadium: Grotenburg-Stadion; Attendance: 10,200; Referee: Manfred Neuner

7 December 1990 16	Borussia Dortmund	1–1	Bayer Leverkusen	Dortmund
20:00	13' Jürgen Wegmann		8' Andreas Thom	Stadium: Westfalenstadion; Attendance: 28,616; Referee: Rainer Boos

15 December 1990 17	FC St. Pauli	0–2	Borussia Dortmund	Hamburg
15:30			1' Michael Lusch; 73' Jürgen Wegmann	Stadium: Stadion am Millerntor; Attendance: 16,870; Referee: Hans Fux

23 February 1991 18	VfB Stuttgart	7–0	Borussia Dortmund	Stuttgart
15:30	3' Eyjólfur Sverrisson; 4' Karl Allgöwer; 11' Eyjólfur Sverrisson; 25' Eyjólfur Sverrisson; 63' Karl Allgöwer; 89' Fritz Walter; 90' Fritz Walter			Stadium: Neckarstadion; Attendance: 22,000; Referee: Wolf-Günter Wiesel

2 March 1991 19	Borussia Dortmund	2–2	Karlsruher SC	Dortmund
15:30	44' Michael Rummenigge; 84' Michael Rummenigge		1' Arno Glesius; 14' Mehmet Scholl	Stadium: Westfalenstadion; Attendance: 28,507; Referee: Peter Mölm

9 March 1991 20	1. FC Kaiserslautern	2–2	Borussia Dortmund	Kaiserslautern
15:30	44' Reinhard Stumpf; 80' Bernhard Winkler		19' Sergei Gorlukovich; 59' Michael Rummenigge	Stadium: Fritz-Walter-Stadion; Attendance: 29,821; Referee: Hans Scheurer

16 March 1991 21	Borussia Dortmund	1–1	Fortuna Düsseldorf	Dortmund
15:30	74' Gerhard Poschner		9' Thomas Allofs	Stadium: Westfalenstadion; Attendance: 35,398; Referee: Wolf-Rüdiger Umbach

23 March 1991 22	VfL Bochum	2–2	Borussia Dortmund	Bochum
15:30	51' Peter Peschel; 90' Michael Rzehaczek		30' Michael Zorc (P); 41' Günter Breitzke	Stadium: Ruhrstadion; Attendance: 32,000; Referee: Karl-Heinz Tritschler

2 April 1991 23	Borussia Dortmund	1–1	Werder Bremen	Dortmund
20:00	15' Thomas Helmer		20' Wynton Rufer	Stadium: Westfalenstadion; Attendance: 42,096; Referee: Manfred Neuner

6 April 1991 24	Borussia Mönchengladbach	2–1	Borussia Dortmund	Mönchengladbach
15:30	59' Martin Max; 66' Michael Spies		5' Günter Breitzke	Stadium: Bökelbergstadion; Attendance: 25,000; Referee: Hermann Albrecht

13 April 1991 25	Borussia Dortmund	1–2	1. FC Köln	Dortmund
15:30	61' Michael Rummenigge (P)		20' Maurice Banach; 35' Maurice Banach	Stadium: Westfalenstadion; Attendance: 44,547; Referee: Bodo Kriegelstein

17 April 1991 26	Hamburger SV	4–0	Borussia Dortmund	Hamburg
20:00	13' Nando; 20' Jan Furtok; 62' Nando; 70' Nando			Stadium: Volksparkstadion; Attendance: 22,800; Referee: Hans-Peter Dellwing

20 April 1991 27	Borussia Dortmund	0–3	Eintracht Frankfurt	Dortmund
15:30			52' Stefan Studer; 79' Thomas Lasser; 89' Andreas Möller	Stadium: Westfalenstadion; Attendance: 34,474; Referee: Werner Föckler

4 May 1991 28	Borussia Dortmund	2–2	SG Wattenscheid 09	Dortmund
15:30	44' Martin Driller; 81' Martin Driller		25' Ali Ibrahim Pelé; 74' Jörg Bach	Stadium: Westfalenstadion; Attendance: 28,383; Referee: Bernd Heynemann

11 May 1991 29	Hertha BSC	2–2	Borussia Dortmund	Berlin
15:30	43' Sven Kretschmer; 44' Theo Gries		2' Michael Zorc; 31' Günter Breitzke	Stadium: Olympiastadion; Attendance: 7,090; Referee: Manfred Amerell

17 May 1991 30	Borussia Dortmund	2–3	Bayern Munich	Dortmund
20:00	4' Gerhard Poschner; 55' Michael Rummenigge		45' Roland Grahammer; 62' Brian Laudrup; 87' Christian Ziege	Stadium: Westfalenstadion; Attendance: 53,000; Referee: Gerhard Theobald

24 May 1991 31	1. FC Nürnberg	1–1	Borussia Dortmund	Nuremberg
20:00	38' Marc Oechler		41' Michael Zorc	Stadium: Städtisches Stadion; Attendance: 34,300; Referee: Wolf-Rüdiger Umbach

31 May 1991 32	Borussia Dortmund	1–0	Bayer 05 Uerdingen	Dortmund
20:00	85' Jürgen Wegmann			Stadium: Westfalenstadion; Attendance: 28,274; Referee: Karl-Josef Assenmacher

8 June 1991 33	Bayer Leverkusen	1–2	Borussia Dortmund	Leverkusen
15:30	43' Martin Kree (P)		73' Gerhard Poschner; 77' Michael Schulz	Stadium: Ulrich-Haberland-Stadion; Attendance: 11,000; Referee: Dieter Birlenbach

15 June 1991 34	Borussia Dortmund	5–2	FC St. Pauli	Dortmund
15:30	4' Gerhard Poschner; 39' Michael Rummenigge (P); 52' Flemming Povlsen; 60' Jürgen Wegmann; 61' Flemming Povlsen		44' André Golke; 73' Klaus Ottens (P)	Stadium: Westfalenstadion; Attendance: 30,624; Referee: Karl-Heinz Tritschler

=== UEFA Cup ===
18 September 1990 First round	Borussia Dortmund	2–0	Chemnitzer FC	Dortmund
	20' Thomas Helmer; 89' Frank Mill			Stadium: Westfalenstadion; Attendance: 30,100; Referee: Martin Navarrete

2 October 1990 First round	Chemnitzer FC	0–2	Borussia Dortmund	Chemnitz
			24' Thomas Helmer; 50' Michael Rummenigge	Stadium: Stadion an der Gellertstraße; Attendance: 11,900; Referee: Keith Hackett

24 October 1990 Second round	FC U Craiova 1948	0–3	Borussia Dortmund	Craiova
13:30			58' Michael Zorc; 68' Frank Mill; 76' Frank Mill	Stadium: FCU Football Park; Attendance: 25,000; Referee: Carlo Longhi

6 November 1990 Second round	Borussia Dortmund	1–0	FC U Craiova 1948	Dortmund
20:00	39' Michael Zorc			Stadium: Westfalenstadion; Attendance: 20,117; Referee: Dimitar Dmitrov

28 November 1990 Third round	RSC Anderlecht	1–0	Borussia Dortmund	Anderlecht
20:00	74' Marc Van Der Linden			Stadium: Constant Vanden Stock Stadium; Attendance: 25,500; Referee: José Rosa dos Santos

12 December 1990 Third round	Borussia Dortmund	2–1	RSC Anderlecht	Dortmund
20:00	49' Sergei Gorlukovich; 80' Michael Schulz		39' Alain Van Baekel	Stadium: Westfalenstadion; Attendance: 40,100; Referee: Zoran Petrović

== Statistics ==
=== Squad statistics ===
No.	Pos	Nat	Player	Total		Bundesliga		UEFA Cup	
No.	Pos	Nat	Player	Apps	Goals	Apps	Goals	Apps	Goals
	GK	(Germany) GER	Wolfgang de Beer	38	0	32	0	6	0
	GK	(Germany) GER	Stefan Klos	2	0	2	0	0	0
	GK	(Germany) GER	Rolf Meyer	0	0	0	0	0	0
	DF	(Germany) GER	Uwe Grauer	2	0	2	0	0	0
	DF	(Germany) GER	Peter Quallo	24	0	18	0	6	0
	DF	(Germany) GER	Thomas Helmer	39	4	33	2	6	2
	DF	(Russia) RUS	Sergey Gorlukovich	33	2	27	1	6	1
	DF	(Germany) GER	Michael Schulz	31	2	26	1	5	1
	DF	(Germany) GER	Günter Kutowski	29	1	25	1	4	0
	DF	(Germany) GER	Robert Nikolic	14	0	13	0	1	0
	MF	(Germany) GER	Michael Zorc	34	7	30	5	4	2
	MF	(Germany) GER	Gerhard Poschner	31	4	27	4	4	0
	MF	(Germany) GER	Thomas Franck	23	0	20	0	3	0
	MF	(Germany) GER	Mario Plechaty	1	0	1	0	0	0
	MF	(Scotland) SCO	Murdo MacLeod	9	1	7	1	2	0
	MF	(Germany) GER	Stefan Sterath	13	1	12	1	1	0
	MF	(Germany) GER	Steffen Karl	12	0	12	0	0	0
	MF	(Germany) GER	Dirk Hofmann	1	0	1	0	0	0
	MF	(Germany) GER	Michael Lusch	28	3	22	3	6	0
	MF	(Germany) GER	Günter Breitzke	24	3	22	3	2	0
	MF	(Germany) GER	Tim Gutberlet	0	0	0	0	0	0
	MF	(Germany) GER	Michael Rummenigge	37	9	31	8	6	1
	FW	(Germany) GER	Frank Mill	17	6	13	3	4	3
	FW	(Germany) GER	Martin Driller	18	2	17	2	1	0
	FW	(Denmark) DEN	Flemming Povlsen	36	5	30	5	6	0
	FW	(Germany) GER	Jürgen Wegmann	20	6	18	6	2	0
