= 1991–92 Borussia Dortmund season =

80th season in existence of Borussia Dortmund

Borussia Dortmund
1991–92 season
- Manager: Ottmar Hitzfeld
- Stadium: Westfalenstadion
- Bundesliga: 2nd
- DFB-Pokal: Third round
- Top goalscorer: League: Stéphane Chapuisat (20 goals); All: Stéphane Chapuisat (21 goals)

The 1991–92 Borussia Dortmund season was the 80th season in the club's history and the 16th season since promotion from 2. Bundesliga in 1976. Borussia finished second in the league behind VfB Stuttgart.

The club also participated in the DFB-Pokal where it reached the third round, losing 2–3 to Hannover 96.

== Competitions ==
=== Overview ===
Competition	First match	Last match	Starting round	Final position	Record							
Competition	First match	Last match	Starting round	Final position	Pld	W	D	L	GF	GA	GD	Win %
Bundesliga	3 August 1991	16 May 1992	Matchday 1	Runner-ups	38	20	12	6	66	47	+19	52.63
DFB-Pokal	17 August 1991	4 September 1991	Second round	Third round	2	1	0	1	4	3	+1	50.00
Total					40	21	12	7	70	50	+20	52.50

Source: Competitions

=== Bundesliga ===
==== League table ====
Pos	Team	Pld	W	D	L	GF	GA	GD	Pts	Qualification or relegation
1	VfB Stuttgart (C)	38	21	10	7	62	32	+30	52	Qualification to Champions League first round
2	Borussia Dortmund	38	20	12	6	66	47	+19	52	Qualification to UEFA Cup first round
3	Eintracht Frankfurt	38	18	14	6	76	41	+35	50	Qualification to UEFA Cup first round
4	1. FC Köln	38	13	18	7	58	41	+17	44	Qualification to UEFA Cup first round
5	1. FC Kaiserslautern	38	17	10	11	58	42	+16	44	Qualification to UEFA Cup first round

Source: www.dfb.de
Rules for classification: 1) points; 2) goal difference; 3) number of goals scored.
The league contracted back to 18 teams for the 1992–93 season.
(C) Champions

==== Matches ====
3 August 1991 1	Karlsruher SC	2–2	Borussia Dortmund	Karlsruhe
15:30	Hermann 3'; Scholl 77'	Report	Chapuisat 23'; Breitzke 82'	Stadium: Wildparkstadion; Attendance: 21,000; Referee: Manfred Harder

10 August 1991 2	Borussia Dortmund	2–1	Werder Bremen	Dortmund
15:30	Mill 68', 72'	Report	Allofs 79'	Stadium: Westfalenstadion; Attendance: 44,023; Referee: Hans Fux

14 August 1991 3	Hansa Rostock	5–1	Borussia Dortmund	Rostock
20:00	Böger 27'; Sedláček 45', 68'; Spies 47' (pen.), 82' (pen.)	Report	Chapuisat 66'	Stadium: Ostseestadion; Attendance: 25,000; Referee: Wolfgang Mierswa

20 August 1991 4	Borussia Dortmund	3–1	Fortuna Düsseldorf	Dortmund
20:00	Mill 3'; Reinhardt 36'; Povlsen 90'	Report	Andersen 80'	Stadium: Westfalenstadion; Attendance: 36,326; Referee: Hans-Peter Dellwing

24 August 1991 5	Schalke 04	5–2	Borussia Dortmund	Gelsenkirchen
15:30	Anderbrügge 2'; Güttler 63' (pen.); Luginger 72'; Schlipper 89'; Sendscheid 90'	Report	Schulz 36'; Chapuisat 86'	Stadium: Parkstadion; Attendance: 70,200; Referee: Manfred Neuner

28 August 1991 6	Borussia Dortmund	4–0	Dynamo Dresden	Dortmund
20:00	Chapuisat 66', 72'; Poschner 76'; Schmidt 88'	Report		Stadium: Westfalenstadion; Attendance: 35,000; Referee: Manfred Amerell

31 August 1991 7	VfL Bochum	0–0	Borussia Dortmund	Bochum
15:30		Report		Stadium: Ruhrstadion; Attendance: 31,000; Referee: Hans Scheurer

6 September 1991 8	Borussia Dortmund	3–1	1. FC Köln	Dortmund
20:00	Mill 37'; Rummenigge 69'; Povlsen 76'	Report	Banach 14'	Stadium: Westfalenstadion; Attendance: 42,611; Referee: Günther Habermann

14 September 1991 9	1. FC Kaiserslautern	4–0	Borussia Dortmund	Kaiserslautern
15:30	Degen 35', 40', 66'; Hotić 78'	Report		Stadium: Fritz-Walter-Stadion; Attendance: 33,167; Referee: Hans-Joachim Osmers

21 September 1991 10	Borussia Dortmund	2–2	Hamburger SV	Dortmund
15:30	Lusch 6'; Poschner 19'	Report	Furtok 14' (pen.), 73'	Stadium: Westfalenstadion; Attendance: 44,976; Referee: Aron Schmidhuber

28 September 1991 11	Eintracht Frankfurt	3–0	Borussia Dortmund	Frankfurt
15:30	Weber 20'; Sippel 55'; Möller 71'	Report		Stadium: Waldstadion; Attendance: 29,000; Referee: Lutz Michael Fröhlich

4 October 1991 12	Borussia Dortmund	3–2	1. FC Nürnberg	Dortmund
20:00	Chapuisat 36', 70'; Rummenigge 38' (pen.)	Report	Reinhardt 61' (o.g.); Friedmann 78'	Stadium: Westfalenstadion; Attendance: 37,197; Referee: Gerhard Theobald

12 October 1991 13	Bayern Munich	0–3	Borussia Dortmund	Munich
15:30		Report	Rummenigge 25'; Povlsen 47'; Münch 86' (o.g.)	Stadium: Olympiastadion; Attendance: 27,000; Referee: Bernd Heynemann

20 October 1991 14	Borussia Dortmund	3–1	Stuttgarter Kickers	Dortmund
18:00	Novodomsky 65' (o.g.); Povlsen 79'; Chapuisat 90'	Report	Kula 69'	Stadium: Westfalenstadion; Attendance: 42,000; Referee: Michael Malbranc

26 October 1991 15	Borussia Dortmund	0–0	VfB Stuttgart	Dortmund
15:30		Report		Stadium: Westfalenstadion; Attendance: 45,371; Referee: Alfons Berg

2 November 1991 16	Borussia Mönchengladbach	1–1	Borussia Dortmund	Mönchengladbach
15:30	Salou 63'	Report	Chapuisat 56'	Stadium: Bökelbergstadion; Attendance: 29,500; Referee: Werner Föckler

8 November 1991 17	Borussia Dortmund	1–1	SG Wattenscheid 09	Dortmund
20:00	Chapuisat 65'	Report	Greiser 90'	Stadium: Westfalenstadion; Attendance: 30,433; Referee: Michael Prengel

16 November 1991 18	Bayer Leverkusen	0–2	Borussia Dortmund	Leverkusen
15:30		Report	Rummenigge 69'; Chapuisat 79'	Stadium: Ulrich-Haberland-Stadion; Attendance: 18,000; Referee: Hans-Jürgen Weber

23 November 1991 19	Borussia Dortmund	2–1	MSV Duisburg	Dortmund
15:30	Rummenigge 37'; Tarnat 78' (o.g.)	Report	Tönnies 40'	Stadium: Westfalenstadion; Attendance: 48,912; Referee: Hans-Peter Best

29 November 1991 20	Borussia Dortmund	1–0	Karlsruher SC	Dortmund
20:00	Povlsen 42'	Report		Stadium: Westfalenstadion; Attendance: 35,020; Referee: Klaus-Dieter Stenzel

6 December 1991 21	Werder Bremen	0–1	Borussia Dortmund	Bremen
20:00		Report	Lusch 34'	Stadium: Weser-Stadion; Attendance: 17,000; Referee: Manfred Amerell

13 December 1991 22	Borussia Dortmund	4–1	Hansa Rostock	Dortmund
20:00	Wahl 3' (o.g.); Rummenigge 33', 76'; Karl 66'	Report	Dowe 73'	Stadium: Westfalenstadion; Attendance: 41,744; Referee: Hartmut Strampe

8 February 1992 23	Fortuna Düsseldorf	1–1	Borussia Dortmund	Düsseldorf
15:30	Rahn 60'	Report	Helmer 36'	Stadium: Rheinstadion; Attendance: 30,000; Referee: Karl-Josef Assenmacher

15 February 1992 24	Borussia Dortmund	2–0	Schalke 04	Dortmund
15:30	Chapuisat 29'; Reinhardt 74'	Report		Stadium: Westfalenstadion; Attendance: 52,000; Referee: Werner Föckler

22 February 1992 25	Dynamo Dresden	0–0	Borussia Dortmund	Dresden
15:30		Report		Stadium: Rudolf-Harbig-Stadion; Attendance: 18,000; Referee: Hans-Peter Dellwing

29 February 1992 26	Borussia Dortmund	1–1	VfL Bochum	Dortmund
15:30	Rummenigge 67'	Report	Wegmann 55'	Stadium: Westfalenstadion; Attendance: 44,509; Referee: Hans-Joachim Osmers

7 March 1992 27	1. FC Köln	1–2	Borussia Dortmund	Köln
15:30	Götz 57'	Report	Chapuisat 49'; Zorc 62'	Stadium: Müngersdorfer Stadion; Attendance: 46,000; Referee: Eugen Strigel

14 March 1992 28	Borussia Dortmund	3–1	1. FC Kaiserslautern	Dortmund
15:30	Chapuisat 30'; Zorc 45', 51' (pen.)	Report	Kranz 86'	Stadium: Westfalenstadion; Attendance: 52,616; Referee: Aron Schmidhuber

20 March 1992 29	Hamburger SV	1–1	Borussia Dortmund	Hamburg
20:00	Furtok 33'	Report	Chapuisat 28'	Stadium: Volksparkstadion; Attendance: 31,500; Referee: Hans Fux

28 March 1992 30	Borussia Dortmund	2–2	Eintracht Frankfurt	Dortmund
15:30	Zorc 10'; Poschner 50'	Report	Yeboah 4'; Falkenmayer 54'	Stadium: Westfalenstadion; Attendance: 52,616; Referee: Wieland Ziller

3 April 1992 31	1. FC Nürnberg	2–1	Borussia Dortmund	Nürnberg
20:00	Zárate 11' (pen.); Wück 28'	Report	Chapuisat 34'	Stadium: Frankenstadion; Attendance: 48,500; Referee: Hans-Jürgen Kasper

10 April 1992 32	Borussia Dortmund	3–0	Bayern Munich	Dortmund
20:00	Rummenigge 20'; Franck 59'; Chapuisat 82'	Report		Stadium: Westfalenstadion; Attendance: 52,616; Referee: Edgar Steinborn

16 April 1992 33	Stuttgarter Kickers	0–1	Borussia Dortmund	Stuttgart
19:30		Report	Rummenigge 51'	Stadium: Neckarstadion; Attendance: 22,000; Referee: Bernd Heynemann

25 April 1992 34	VfB Stuttgart	4–2	Borussia Dortmund	Stuttgart
15:30	Helmer 32' (o.g.); Walter 45', 71'; Gaudino 90'	Report	Povlsen 14'; Helmer 84'	Stadium: Neckarstadion; Attendance: 68,000; Referee: Manfred Harder

2 May 1992 35	Borussia Dortmund	2–2	Borussia Mönchengladbach	Dortmund
15:30	Zorc 74', 89'	Report	Pflipsen 10'; Schneider 46'	Stadium: Westfalenstadion; Attendance: 52,616; Referee: Klaus-Dieter Stenzel

5 May 1992 36	SG Wattenscheid 09	0–1	Borussia Dortmund	Bochum-Wattenscheid
20:00		Report	Chapuisat 65'	Stadium: Lohrheidestadion; Attendance: 33,000; Referee: Aron Schmidhuber

9 May 1992 37	Borussia Dortmund	3–1	Bayer Leverkusen	Dortmund
15:30	Chapuisat 38'; Reinhardt 63'; Povlsen 86'	Report	Jorginho 88'	Stadium: Westfalenstadion; Attendance: 50,120; Referee: Wolf-Günter Wiesel

16 May 1992 38	MSV Duisburg	0–1	Borussia Dortmund	Duisburg
15:30		Report	Chapuisat 9'	Stadium: Wedaustadion; Attendance: 30,175; Referee: Markus Merk

=== DFB Pokal ===
17 August 1991 Second round	Arminia Bielefeld	0–2	Borussia Dortmund	Bielefeld
15:30		Report	Rummenigge 72'; Mill 80'	Stadium: Bielefelder Alm; Attendance: 17,500; Referee: Bernd Heynemann

4 September 1991 Third round	Borussia Dortmund	2–3	Hannover 96	Dortmund
20:00	Schmidt 20'; Chapuisat 28'	Report	Grün 71'; Breitenreiter 82'; Klütz 89'	Stadium: Westfalenstadion; Attendance: 14,100; Referee: Manfred Schmidt

== Statistics ==
=== Squad statistics ===
No.	Pos	Nat	Player	Total		Bundesliga		DFB-Pokal	
No.	Pos	Nat	Player	Apps	Goals	Apps	Goals	Apps	Goals
	GK	(Germany) GER	Wolfgang de Beer	9	0	7	0	2	0
	GK	(Germany) GER	Stefan Klos	31	0	31	0	0	0
	DF	(Russia) RUS	Sergei Gorlukovich	9	0	7	0	2	0
	DF	(Germany) GER	Uwe Grauer	3	0	3	0	0	0
	DF	(Germany) GER	Thomas Helmer	30	2	29	2	1	0
	DF	(Germany) GER	Günter Kutowski	33	0	33	0	0	0
	DF	(Germany) GER	Michael Lusch	34	2	33	2	1	0
	DF	(Germany) GER	Peter Quallo	4	0	4	0	0	0
	DF	(Germany) GER	Bodo Schmidt	14	2	13	1	1	1
	DF	(Germany) GER	Michael Schulz	40	1	38	1	2	0
	MF	(Germany) GER	Günter Breitzke	14	1	12	1	2	0
	MF	(Germany) GER	Thomas Franck	27	1	27	1	0	0
	MF	(Germany) GER	Wolfgang Homberg	2	0	1	0	1	0
	MF	(Germany) GER	Steffen Karl	30	1	28	1	2	0
	MF	(Germany) GER	Gerhard Poschner	31	3	29	3	2	0
	MF	(Germany) GER	Knut Reinhardt	38	3	36	3	2	0
	MF	(Germany) GER	Dirk Hofmann	1	0	0	0	1	0
	MF	(Germany) GER	Michael Zorc	20	6	19	6	1	0
	FW	(Switzerland) SUI	Stéphane Chapuisat	39	21	37	20	2	1
	FW	(Germany) GER	Frank Mill	29	5	28	4	1	1
	FW	(Denmark) DEN	Flemming Povlsen	40	7	38	7	2	0
	FW	(Germany) GER	Michael Rummenigge	37	11	36	10	1	1
	FW	(Germany) GER	Jürgen Wegmann	1	0	1	0	0	0
