= 1992–93 Borussia Dortmund season =

1992–93 season of Borussia Dortmund

Borussia Dortmund
1992–93 season
- Head coach: Ottmar Hitzfeld
- Stadium: Westfalenstadion
- Bundesliga: 4th
- DFB-Pokal: Round of 16
- UEFA Cup: Runners-up
- Top goalscorer: Stéphane Chapuisat (15)

During the 1992–93 season, Borussia Dortmund played in the 1. Bundesliga, the highest tier of the German football league system.

== Season summary ==
Dortmund dropped to fourth in the final table, but made up for this with their European form. They reached the UEFA Cup final, their first European final since 1966, but were soundly beaten 6–1 on aggregate by Juventus.

== First team squad ==
Squad at end of season

No.	Pos.	Nation	Player
—	GK	GER	Wolfgang de Beer
—	GK	GER	Dirk Galeski
—	GK	GER	Stefan Klos
—	GK	GER	Christof Osigus
—	DF	GER	Uwe Grauer
—	DF	GER	Günter Kutowski
—	DF	GER	Stefan Reuter
—	DF	GER	Bodo Schmidt
—	DF	GER	Michael Schulz
—	DF	AUS	Ned Zelic
—	MF	GER	Thomas Franck
—	MF	GER	Steffen Karl
—	MF	GER	Tim Gutberlet

No.	Pos.	Nation	Player
—	MF	GER	Michael Lusch
—	MF	GER	Gerhard Poschner (Note: Poschner was born in Dumitra, Romania, but was raised in West Germany from the age of 5 and represented Germany at U-21 and U-23 level.)
—	MF	GER	Knut Reinhardt
—	MF	GER	Michael Rummenigge
—	MF	GER	Matthias Sammer
—	MF	GER	René Tretschok
—	MF	GER	Michael Zorc
—	FW	GER	Frank Mill
—	FW	GER	Ulf Raschke
—	FW	GER	Lothar Sippel
—	FW	GER	Jürgen Wegmann
—	FW	SUI	Stéphane Chapuisat
—	FW	DEN	Flemming Povlsen

== Competitions ==
=== Bundesliga ===
==== League table ====
Pos	Team	Pld	W	D	L	GF	GA	GD	Pts	Qualification or relegation
2	Bayern Munich	34	18	11	5	74	45	+29	47	Qualification to UEFA Cup first round
3	Eintracht Frankfurt	34	15	12	7	56	39	+17	42	Qualification to UEFA Cup first round
4	Borussia Dortmund	34	18	5	11	61	43	+18	41	Qualification to UEFA Cup first round
5	Bayer Leverkusen	34	14	12	8	64	45	+19	40	Qualification to Cup Winners' Cup first round
6	Karlsruher SC	34	14	11	9	60	54	+6	39	Qualification to UEFA Cup first round (Note: As Bayer Leverkusen qualified for the Cup Winners' Cup, their UEFA Cup place was transferred to Karlsruhe.)

Source: www.dfb.de
Rules for classification: 1) points; 2) goal difference; 3) number of goals scored.
