= 1988–89 FC Bayern Munich season =

89th season in existence of Bayern Munich

FC Bayern Munich
1988–89 season
- Manager: Jupp Heynckes
- Stadium: Olympiastadion
- Bundesliga: 1st
- UEFA Cup: Semi-finals
- DFB-Pokal: Third round
- Top goalscorer: League: Roland Wohlfarth (17); All: Roland Wohlfarth (23)
Home colours	Away colours

The 1988–89 FC Bayern Munich season was the 89th season in the club's history and 24th season since promotion from Regionalliga Süd in 1965. Bayern won its tenth Bundesliga Title. This title was the fourth title in five seasons. The club reached the third round of the DFB-Pokal and the semifinals of the UEFA Cup. Several changes were made to the roster with eight players leaving via transfer or loan, including Lothar Matthäus, Andreas Brehme and Jean-Marie Pfaff. Six new players joined the club, including Olaf Thon, Stefan Reuter, Roland Grahammer, and Johnny Ekström.

== Results ==
=== Friendlies ===
==== Fuji-Cup ====
Semifinals	1. FC Nürnberg	0–2	Bayern Munich	Augsburg

Final	Bayern Munich	3–0	Borussia Mönchengladbach	Kaiserslautern

==== Wembley International Tournament ====
13 August 1988 1	A.C. Milan	1–0	Bayern Munich	London, England
	Virdis 3'			Stadium: Wembley

14 August 1988 2	Arsenal F.C.	3–0	Bayern Munich	London
	Smith 72', 76'; Dixon 85'			Stadium: Wembley

=== Bundesliga ===
23 July 1988 1	Bayern Munich	3–0	Eintracht Frankfurt	Munich
15:30 CEST	Augentaler 75', 90'; Ekström 81'	Report		Stadium: Olympiastadion; Attendance: 26,000; Referee: Kurt Witke

30 July 1988 2	Karlsruher SC	2–2	Bayern Munich	Karlsruhe
15:30 CEST	Haforth 56'; Spies 86'	Report	Wohlfarth 11'; Thon 71'	Stadium: Wildparkstadion; Attendance: 41,000; Referee: Gerd Zimmermann

20 August 1988 4	Hamburger SV	0–1	Bayern Munich	Hamburg
15:30 CEST		Report	Wegmann 76'	Stadium: Volksparkstadion; Attendance: 35,000; Referee: Karl-Josef Assenmacher

27 August 1988 5	Bayern Munich	5–1	1. FC Kaiserslautern	Munich
15:30 CEST	Augenthaler 43'; Wohlfarth 45'; Ekström 59'; Thon 62'; Nachtweih 90+1'	Report	Kohr 83'	Stadium: Olympiastadion; Attendance: 24,000; Referee: Peter Richmann

3 September 1988 6	Bayer Leverkusen	1–1	Bayern Munich	Leverkusen
15:30 CEST	Leśniak 13'	Report	Wohlfarth 16'	Stadium: Ulrich-Haberland-Stadion; Attendance: 24,000; Referee: Wilfried Heitmann

10 September 1988 7	Bayern Munich	3–0	Borussia Mönchengladbach	Munich
15:30 CEST	Wegmann 16', 75'; Augenthaler 19'	Report		Stadium: Olympiastadion; Attendance: 31,000; Referee: Anton Matheis

13 September 1988 8	SV Werder Bremen	2–2	Bayern Munich	Bremen
20:00 CEST	Meier 15'; Burgsmüller 47'	Report	Wohlfarth 52'; Wegmann 64'	Stadium: Weserstadion; Attendance: 35,000; Referee: Wolf-Günter Wiesel

8 October 1988 10	Hannover 96	0–0	Bayern Munich	Hannover
15:30 CET		Report		Stadium: Niedersachsenstadion; Attendance: 29,700; Referee: Gerhard Theobald

12 October 1988 9	Bayern Munich	1–1	Borussia Dortmund	Munich
20:00 CET	Wegmann 32'	Report	Dickel 7'	Stadium: Olympiastadion; Attendance: 15,000; Referee: Dr. Wolf-Rüdiger Umbach

22 October 1988 11	SV Waldhof Mannheim	0–3	Bayern Munich	Ludwigshafen
15:30 CET		Report	Pflügler 42'; Wohlfarth 43'; Dorfner 76'	Stadium: Südweststadion; Attendance: 22,000; Referee: Klaus Broska

29 October 1988 12	Bayern Munich	3–0	Stuttgarter Kickers	Munich
15:30 CET	Thon 12'; Augenthaler 26'; Wohlfarth 58'	Report		Stadium: Olympiastadion; Attendance: 15,000; Referee: Manfred Harder

5 November 1988 13	FC St. Pauli	0–0	Bayern Munich	St. Pauli
15:30 CET		Report		Stadium: Wilhelm-Koch-Stadion; Attendance: 20,551; Referee: Hellmut Krug

12 November 1988 14	Bayern Munich	2–0	1. FC Köln	Munich
15:30 CET	Wegmann 50'; Pflügler 66'	Report		Stadium: Olympiastadion; Attendance: 34,000; Referee: Karl-Heinz Tritschler

15 November 1988 3	Bayern Munich	3–3	VfB Stuttgart	Munich
20:00 CET	Wohlfarth 38'; Wegmann 82'; Ekström 83'	Report	Walter 7'; Gaudino 55', 74'	Stadium: Olympiastadion; Attendance: 63,000; Referee: Hans-Joachim Osmers

19 November 1988 15	Bayer 05 Uerdingen	1–3	Bayern Munich	Krefeld
15:30 CET	Nijskens 50'	Report	Wohlfarth 60'; Ekström 82'; Thon 90'	Stadium: Grotenburg-Stadion; Attendance: 28,000; Referee: Heinz Werner

26 November 1988 16	Bayern Munich	1–0	1. FC Nürnberg	Munich
15:30 CET	Wegmann 35'	Report		Stadium: Olympiastadion; Attendance: 23,000; Referee: Joachim Kautschor

3 December 1988 17	VfL Bochum	0–0	Bayern Munich	Bochum
15:30 CET		Report		Stadium: Ruhrstadion; Attendance: 41,000; Referee: Wolfgang Mierswa

18 February 1989 18	Eintracht Frankfurt	2–2	Bayern Munich	Frankfurt
15:30 CET	Körbel 54'; Eckstein 72'	Report	Wegmann 46'; Thon 73'	Stadium: Waldstadion; Attendance: 47,350; Referee: Manfred Neuner

25 February 1989 19	Bayern Munich	3–2	Karlsruher SC	Munich
15:30 CET	Wegmann 27'; Wohlfarth 34', 75'	Report	Trapp 64'; Hermann 73'	Stadium: Olympiastadion; Attendance: 21,000; Referee: Karl-Josef Assenmacher

4 March 1989 20	VfB Stuttgart	1–2	Bayern Munich	Stuttgart
15:30 CET	Gaudino 3'	Report	Nachtweih 39'; Ekström 80'	Stadium: Neckarstadion; Attendance: 63,000; Referee: Dieter Pauly

11 March 1989 21	Bayern Munich	1–0	Hamburger SV	Munich
15:30 CET	Wegmann 58'	Report		Stadium: Olympiastadion; Attendance: 54,000; Referee: Gerhard Theobald

18 March 1989 22	1. FC Kaiserslautern	1–1	Bayern Munich	Kaiserslautern
15:30 CET	Roos 16'	Report	Nachtweih 15'	Stadium: Fritz-Walter-Stadion; Attendance: 38,500; Referee: Dr. Wolf-Rüdiger Umbach

25 March 1989 23	Bayern Munich	2–0	Bayer Leverkusen	Munich
15:30 CET	Thon 73'; Eck 78'	Report		Stadium: Olympiastadion; Attendance: 21,000; Referee: Serge Muhmenthaler

1 April 1989 24	Borussia Mönchengladbach	2–1	Bayern Munich	Mönchengladbach
15:30 CEST	Neun 45'; Hochstätter 67'	Report	Ekström 24'	Stadium: Bökelbergstadion; Attendance: 34,500; Referee: Wolf-Günter Wiesel

8 April 1989 25	Bayern Munich	0–0	SV Werder Bremen	Munich
15:30 CEST		Report		Stadium: Olympiastadion; Attendance: 51,000; Referee: Hans-Jürgen Weber

15 April 1989 26	Borussia Dortmund	1–1	Bayern Munich	Dortmund
15:30 CEST	Breitzke 46'	Report	Pflügler 53'	Stadium: Westfalenstadion; Attendance: 54,000; Referee: Heinz Werner

29 April 1989 27	Bayern Munich	4–0	Hannover 96	Munich
15:30 CEST	Wegmann 10'; Dorfner 13', 32', 34'	Report		Stadium: Olympiastadion; Attendance: 12,000; Referee: Edgar Steinborn

6 May 1989 28	Bayern Munich	1–0	SV Waldhof Mannheim	Munich
15:30 CEST	Thon 79'	Report		Stadium: Olympiastadion; Attendance: 15,000; Referee: Dieter Birlenbach

13 May 1989 29	Stuttgarter Kickers	2–0	Bayern Munich	Stuttgart
15:30 CEST	Wolf 18'; Schüler 75'	Report		Stadium: Neckarstadion; Attendance: 25,200; Referee: Peter Richmann

20 May 1989 30	Bayern Munich	2–1	FC St. Pauli	Munich
15:30 CEST	Wegmann 17'; Pflügler 47'	Report	Duve 55'	Stadium: Olympiastadion; Attendance: 25,000; Referee: Dr. Markus Merk

25 May 1989 31	1. FC Köln	1–3	Bayern Munich	Cologne
15:30 CEST	Allofs 32'	Report	Wohlfarth 25', 85', 89'	Stadium: Müngersdorfer Stadion; Attendance: 58,000; Referee: Wolf-Günter Wiesel

3 June 1989 32	Bayern Munich	5–0	Bayer 05 Uerdingen	Munich
15:30 CEST	Ekström 20'; Dorfner 25', 75'; Flick 82', 90'	Report		Stadium: Olympiastadion; Attendance: 18,000; Referee: Rainer Boos

10 June 1989 33	1. FC Nürnberg	2–1	Bayern Munich	Nuremberg
15:30 CEST	Wirsching 33'; Sané 42'	Report	Augenthaler 44'	Stadium: Städtisches Stadion; Attendance: 42,150; Referee: Dieter Pauly

17 June 1989 34	Bayern Munich	5–0	VfL Bochum	Munich
15:30 CEST	Wohlfarth 5', 14', 69', 76'; Thon 72'	Report		Stadium: Olympiastadion; Attendance: 68,000; Referee: Manfred Neuner

==== Results by round ====
Round	1	2	3	4	5	6	7	8	9	10	11	12	13	14	15	16	17	18	19	20	21	22	23	24	25	26	27	28	29	30	31	32	33	34
Ground	H	A	H	A	H	A	H	A	H	A	A	H	A	H	A	H	A	A	H	A	H	A	H	A	H	A	H	H	A	H	A	H	A	H
Result	W	D	D	W	W	D	W	D	D	D	W	W	D	W	W	W	D	D	W	W	W	D	W	L	D	D	W	W	L	W	W	W	L	W
Position	2	2	1	3	1	2	1	1	2	2	1	1	1	1	1	1	1	1	1	1	1	1	1	1	1	1	1	1	1	1	1	1	1	1

A = Away; H = Home; W = Win; D = Draw; L = Loss

==== League standings ====
Pos	Team	Pld	W	D	L	GF	GA	GD	Pts	Qualification or relegation
1	Bayern Munich (C)	34	19	12	3	67	26	+41	50	Qualification to European Cup first round
2	1. FC Köln	34	18	9	7	58	30	+28	45	Qualification to UEFA Cup first round
3	Werder Bremen	34	18	8	8	55	32	+23	44	Qualification to UEFA Cup first round
4	Hamburger SV	34	17	9	8	60	36	+24	43	Qualification to UEFA Cup first round
5	VfB Stuttgart	34	16	7	11	58	49	+9	39	Qualification to UEFA Cup first round

Source: www.dfb.de
Rules for classification: 1) points; 2) goal difference; 3) number of goals scored.
(C) Champions

=== DFB Pokal ===
6 August 1988 1st Round	Bayern Munich	11–2	Blau-Weiß 90 Berlin	Munich
	Ekström 4', 31'; Thon 21', 34', 72', 85' (pen.), 90' (pen.); Wohlfarth 49', 73'; Nachtweih 69'; Wegmann 76'	Report	Dinauer 48'; Adler 82'	Stadium: Olympiastadion; Attendance: 11,000; Referee: Striegel

24 September 1988 2nd Round	TuS Hoisdorf	0–4	Bayern Munich	Hoisdorf
		Report	Eck 22', 70'; Wohlfarth 40'; Kögl 75'	Stadium: Schul- und Sportzentrum Waldstaße; Attendance: 20,000; Referee: Wilfred Diekert

14 February 1989 3rd Round	Bayern Munich	3–4	Karlsruher SC	Munich
	Wohlfarth 11'; Wegmann 41', 59'	Report	Hermann 8', 35'; Heisig 75'; Bogdan 83'	Stadium: Olympiastadion; Attendance: 7,000; Referee: Wilfried Heitmann

=== UEFA Cup ===
==== 1st round ====
7 September 1988 1st leg	Bayern Munich (West Germany)	3–1	(Poland) Legia Warsaw	Munich, West Germany
	Wegmann 9'; Thon 23', 61'	Report	Iwanicki 55'	Stadium: Olympiastadion; Attendance: 15,000; Referee: Lajos Hartmann (Hungary)

5 October 1988 2nd leg	Legia Warsaw (Poland)	3–7 (4–10 agg.)	(West Germany) Bayern Munich	Warsaw, Poland
	Kubicki 36'; Robakiewicz 85', 88'	Report	Nachtweih 19'; Ekström 23', 44'; Augenthaler 38'; Wegmann 75', 82'; Eck 89'	Stadium: Polish Army Stadium; Attendance: 20,000; Referee: John Edward Martin (England)

==== 2nd round ====
26 October 1988 1st leg	Bayern Munich (West Germany)	3–1	(Czechoslovakia) DAC Dunajská Streda	Munich, West Germany
	Flick 21'; Wegmann 53'; Thon 76'	Report	Szaban 78'	Stadium: Olympiastadion; Attendance: 11,000; Referee: Michał Listkiewicz (Poland)

9 November 1988 2nd leg	DAC Dunajská Streda (Czechoslovakia)	0–2 (1–5 agg.)	(West Germany) Bayern Munich	Dunajská Streda, Czechoslovakia
		Report	Thon 5' (pen.), 28'	Attendance: 15,600; Referee: Thomas Oliver Donnelly (Northern Ireland)

==== 3rd round ====
23 November 1988 1st leg	Bayern Munich (West Germany)	0–2	(Italy) Internazionale Milano	Munich, West Germany
		Report	Serena 60'; Berti 71'	Stadium: Olympiastadion; Attendance: 70,000; Referee: Alexis Ponnet (Belgium)

7 December 1988 2nd leg	Internazionale Milano (Italy)	1–3 (3–3a agg.)	(West Germany) Bayern Munich	Milan, Italy
18:00 CET	Serena 45'	Report	Wohlfarth 33'; Augenthaler 37'; Wegmann 41'	Stadium: San Siro; Attendance: 75,000; Referee: Bruno Galler (Switzerland)

==== Quarter-finals ====
28 February 1989 1st leg	Heart of Midlothian F.C. (Scotland)	1–0	(West Germany) Bayern Munich	Edinburgh, Scotland
	Ferguson 56'	Report		Stadium: Tynecastle Stadium; Attendance: 26,300; Referee: Helmut Kohl (Austria)

15 March 1989 2nd leg	Bayern Munich (West Germany)	2–0 (2–1 agg.)	(Scotland) Heart of Midlothian F.C.	Munich, West Germany
18:00 CET	Augenthaler 16'; Johnsen 69'	Report		Stadium: Olympiastadion; Attendance: 25,000; Referee: Emilio Soriano Aladrén (Spain)

==== Semi-finals ====
5 April 1989 1st leg	S.S.C. Napoli (Italy)	2–0	(West Germany) Bayern Munich	Naples, Italy
	Careca 41'; Carnevale 60'	Report		Stadium: Stadio San Paolo; Attendance: 82,000; Referee: Michel Vautrot (France)

19 April 1989 2nd leg	Bayern Munich (West Germany)	2–2 (2–4 agg.)	(Italy) S.S.C. Napoli	Munich, West Germany
	Wohlfarth 65'; Reuter 81'	Report	Careca 62', 79'	Stadium: Olympiastadion; Attendance: 73,500; Referee: David F.T. Syme (Scotland)

== Team statistics ==
Competition	First match	Last match	Starting round	Final position	Record							
Competition	First match	Last match	Starting round	Final position	G	W	D	L	GF	GA	GD	Win %
Bundesliga	23 July 1988	17 June 1989	Matchday 1	Winner	34	19	12	3	67	26	+41	55.88
DFB-Pokal	6 August 1988	14 February 1989	First round	Third round	3	2	0	1	18	6	+12	66.67
UEFA Cup	7 September 1988	19 April 1989	First round	Semifinals	10	6	1	3	22	13	+9	60.00
Total					47	27	13	7	107	45	+62	57.45

== Players ==
=== Squad, appearances and goals ===
No.	Pos	Nat	Player	Total		Bundesliga		DFB-Pokal		UEFA Cup	
No.	Pos	Nat	Player	Apps	Goals	Apps	Goals	Apps	Goals	Apps	Goals
	GK	(West Germany) FRG	Raimond Aumann	47	0	34+0	0	3+0	0	10+0	0
	DF	(West Germany) FRG	Hans Pflügler	45	4	34+0	4	3+0	0	8+0	0
	DF	(West Germany) FRG	Stefan Reuter	45	1	32+0	0	3+0	0	10+0	1
	DF	(West Germany) FRG	Klaus Augenthaler (captain)	44	9	31+0	6	3+0	0	10+0	3
	DF	(West Germany) FRG	Roland Grahammer	38	0	26+2	0	2+0	0	7+1	0
	DF	(Norway) NOR	Erland Johnsen	24	1	7+6	0	1+0	0	8+2	1
	DF	(West Germany) FRG	Uli Bayerschmidt	1	0	0+0	0	0+0	0	1+0	0
	DF	(West Germany) FRG	Matthias Hamann	1	0	0+0	0	0+1	0	0+0	0
	MF	(West Germany) FRG	Olaf Thon	42	18	32+0	8	2+0	5	8+0	5
	MF	(East Germany) GDR	Norbert Nachtweih	41	5	28+1	3	3+0	1	8+1	1
	MF	(West Germany) FRG	Hansi Flick	41	3	27+3	2	3+0	0	8+0	1
	MF	(West Germany) FRG	Armin Eck	32	4	8+13	1	2+0	2	3+6	1
	MF	(West Germany) FRG	Hans Dorfner	28	6	21+1	6	0+0	0	5+1	0
	MF	(West Germany) FRG	Helmut Winklhofer	2	0	0+1	0	0+0	0	0+1	0
	FW	(West Germany) FRG	Roland Wohlfarth	46	23	33+0	17	3+0	4	10+0	2
	FW	(West Germany) FRG	Ludwig Kögl	44	1	28+4	0	2+1	1	8+1	0
	FW	(West Germany) FRG	Jürgen Wegmann	42	21	21+10	13	2+1	3	6+2	5
	FW	(Sweden) SWE	Johnny Ekström	34	11	12+11	7	1+2	2	5+3	2

=== Bookings ===
No.	Player	Bundesliga			DFB-Pokal			UEFA Cup			Total		
No.	Player	Booked	(yellow card) (red card)	Sent off (straight red)	Booked	(yellow card) (red card)	Sent off (straight red)	Booked	(yellow card) (red card)	Sent off (straight red)	Booked	(yellow card) (red card)	Sent off (straight red)
	Klaus Augenthaler	6	0	0	0	0	0	1	0	0	7	0	0
	Roland Grahammer	6	0	0	0	0	0	1	0	0	7	0	0
	Olaf Thon	3	0	0	1	0	0	3	0	0	7	0	0
	Norbert Nachtweih	5	0	0	0	0	0	1	0	0	6	0	0
	Hansi Flick	5	0	0	0	0	0	0	0	0	5	0	0
	Hans Pflügler	3	0	0	0	0	0	2	0	0	5	0	0
	Stefan Reuter	4	0	0	1	0	0	0	0	0	5	0	0
	Roland Wohlfarth	5	0	0	0	0	0	0	0	0	5	0	0
	Hans Dorfner	2	0	0	0	0	0	1	0	0	3	0	0
	Erland Johnsen	2	0	0	1	0	0	0	0	0	3	0	0
	Johnny Ekström	1	0	0	0	0	1	1	0	0	2	0	1
	Raimond Aumann	1	0	0	0	0	0	0	0	0	1	0	0
	Ludwig Kögl	1	0	0	0	0	0	0	0	0	1	0	0
Totals		44	0	0	3	0	1	10	0	0	57	0	1

== Transfers ==
=== In ===
No.	Pos.	Nat.	Name	Age	EU	Moving from	Type	Transfer window	Ends	Transfer fee	Source
	MF	(West Germany)	Olaf Thon	22	EU	Schalke 04	Transfer	Summer		€1.7 Million	
	DF	(West Germany)	Stefan Reuter	21	EU	1. FC Nürnberg	Transfer	Summer		€1.65 Million	
	DF	(West Germany)	Roland Grahammer	24	EU	1. FC Nürnberg	Transfer	Summer		€1.65 Million	
	FW	(Sweden)	Johnny Ekström	25	Non-EU	Empoli (Italy)	Transfer	Summer		€1.1 Million	
	DF	(Norway)	Erland Johnsen	21	Non-EU	Moss (Norway)	Transfer	Summer		€175,000	
	DF	(West Germany)	Matthias Hamann	20	EU	Wacker München	Transfer	Summer		€25,000	

=== Out ===
No.	Pos.	Nat.	Name	Age	EU	Moving to	Type	Transfer window	Transfer fee	Source
	MF	(West Germany)	Lothar Matthäus	27	EU	Internazionale (Italy)	Transfer	Summer	€3.6 Million	
	MF	(West Germany)	Andreas Brehme	27	EU	Internazionale (Italy)	Transfer	Summer	€1.1 Million	
	DF	(West Germany)	Uli Bayerschmidt	21	EU	1. FC Nürnberg	Transfer	Summer	€250,000	
	FW	(West Germany)	Michael Rummenigge	24	EU	Borussia Dortmund	Transfer	Summer	Undisclosed	
	GK	(Belgium)	Jean-Marie Pfaff	34	EU	Lierse (Belgium)	Transfer	Summer	Undisclosed	
	DF	(West Germany)	Norbert Eder	32	EU	Zürich (Switzerland)	Transfer	Summer	Undisclosed	
	FW	(Denmark)	Lars Lunde	24	EU	Aarau (Switzerland)	Loan	Summer		
	FW	(Wales)	Mark Hughes	24	EU	Barcelona (Spain)	End of Loan	Summer		
