= 1989 DFB-Pokal final =

- Match programme cover
- Event: 1988–89 DFB-Pokal
Borussia Dortmund	Werder Bremen
4	1
- Date: 24 June 1989
- Venue: Olympiastadion, West Berlin
- Referee: Karl-Heinz Tritschler (Freiburg)
- Attendance: 76,500

The 1989 DFB-Pokal final decided the winner of the 1988–89 DFB-Pokal, the 46th season of Germany's premier knockout football cup competition. It was played on 24 June 1989 at the Olympiastadion in West Berlin. Borussia Dortmund won the match 4–1 against Werder Bremen to claim their second cup title, qualifying for the 1989–90 European Cup Winners' Cup and the 1989 DFB-Supercup.

== Route to the final ==
The DFB-Pokal began with 64 teams in a single-elimination knockout cup competition. There were a total of five rounds leading up to the final. Teams were drawn against each other, and the winner after 90 minutes would advance. If still tied, 30 minutes of extra time was played. If the score was still level, a replay would take place at the original away team's stadium. If still level after 90 minutes, 30 minutes of extra time was played. If the score was still level, a drawing of lots would decide who would advance to the next round.

Note: In all results below, the score of the finalist is given first (H: home; A: away).

Borussia Dortmund		Round	Werder Bremen
Opponent	Result	1988–89 DFB-Pokal	Opponent	Result
Eintracht Braunschweig (H)	6–0	Round 1	Hannover 96 (H)	4–1
FC 08 Homburg (H)	2–1	Round 2	SpVgg Bayreuth (H)	6–1
Schalke 04 (A)	3–2	Round of 16	Fortuna Köln (H)	3–1 (a.e.t.)
Karlsruher SC (H)	1–0	Quarter-finals	Hamburger SV (A)	1–0 (a.e.t.)
VfB Stuttgart (H)	2–0	Semi-finals	Bayer Leverkusen (A)	2–1

== Match ==
=== Details ===
24 June 1989
18:00 CEST

Borussia Dortmund	4–1	Werder Bremen
Dickel 21', 73'; Mill 58'; Lusch 74'	Report	Riedle 15'

Olympiastadion, West Berlin
Attendance: 76,500
Referee: Karl-Heinz Tritschler (Freiburg)

Borussia Dortmund	Werder Bremen

GK	1	(West Germany) Wolfgang de Beer
SW	4	(West Germany) Thomas Kroth
CB	3	(West Germany) Günter Kutowski
CB	5	(West Germany) Thomas Helmer
CB	6	(Scotland) Murdo MacLeod
RM	2	(West Germany) Günter Breitzke	Booked	(substituted off) 73'
CM	8	(West Germany) Michael Zorc (c)
CM	7	(West Germany) Andreas Möller	Booked
LM	10	(West Germany) Michael Rummenigge
CF	9	(West Germany) Norbert Dickel		(substituted off) 77'
CF	11	(West Germany) Frank Mill
Substitutes:
DF	15	(West Germany) Bernd Storck		(substituted in) 77'
MF	12	(West Germany) Michael Lusch		(substituted in) 73'
Manager:
(West Germany) Horst Köppel

GK	1	(West Germany) Oliver Reck (c)
SW	5	(West Germany) Gunnar Sauer		(substituted off) 77'
CB	7	(West Germany) Thomas Wolter	Booked
CB	4	(Norway) Rune Bratseth
RWB	2	(West Germany) Thomas Schaaf
LWB	3	(West Germany) Jonny Otten		(substituted off) 55'
CM	6	(West Germany) Dieter Eilts
CM	8	(West Germany) Miroslav Votava
CM	11	(West Germany) Günter Hermann
CF	10	(West Germany) Frank Neubarth
CF	9	(West Germany) Karl-Heinz Riedle
Substitutes:
DF	13	(West Germany) Manfred Burgsmüller		(substituted in) 77'
FW	12	(West Germany) Frank Ordenewitz		(substituted in) 55'
Manager:
(West Germany) Otto Rehhagel

Match rules

- 90 minutes.
- 30 minutes of extra time if necessary.
- Penalty shoot-out if scores still level.
- Maximum of two substitutions.
