= 1993 UEFA Cup final =

- Event: 1992–93 UEFA Cup
| Borussia Dortmund | Juventus |
| (Germany) | (Italy) |
| 1 | 6 |
- on aggregate

First leg
| Borussia Dortmund | Juventus |
| 1 | 3 |
- Date: 5 May 1993
- Venue: Westfalenstadion, Dortmund
- Referee: Sándor Puhl (Hungary)
- Attendance: 37,900

Second leg
| Juventus | Borussia Dortmund |
| 3 | 0 |
- Date: 19 May 1993
- Venue: Stadio delle Alpi, Turin
- Referee: John Blankenstein (Netherlands)
- Attendance: 62,781

The 1993 UEFA Cup final was played on 5 May 1993 and 19 May 1993 between Juventus of Italy and Borussia Dortmund of Germany. Juventus won 3–1 and 3–0 to record a 6–1 aggregate victory, a record aggregate score for a UEFA Cup final. The fixture would be repeated in the 1997 Champions League Final, when the result would be reversed, with Dortmund running out victors the second time around. By then, three of Juventus' team (Kohler, Möller and Júlio César) had joined Dortmund.

== Route to the final ==
Both finalists had defeated French clubs in their respective semi-finals: Dortmund narrowly beat Auxerre on penalties following a 2–2 aggregate draw, while Juventus successfully saw off Paris Saint-Germain 3–1 on aggregate.

| Borussia Dortmund | | | | Round | Juventus | | | |
|---|---|---|---|---|---|---|---|---|
| Opponent | Agg. | 1st leg | 2nd leg | | Opponent | Agg. | 1st leg | 2nd leg |
| (Malta) Floriana | 8–2 | 1–0 (A) | 7–2 (H) | First round | (Cyprus) Anorthosis Famagusta | 10–1 | 6–1 (H) | 4–0 (A) |
| (Scotland) Celtic | 3–1 | 1–0 (H) | 2–1 (A) | Second round | (Greece) Panathinaikos | 1–0 | 1–0 (A) | 0–0 (H) |
| (Spain) Zaragoza | 4–3 | 3–1 (H) | 1–2 (A) | Third round | (Czechoslovakia) Sigma Olomouc | 7–1 | 2–1 (A) | 5–0 (H) |
| (Italy) Roma | 2–1 | 0–1 (A) | 2–0 (H) | Quarter-finals | (Portugal) Benfica | 4–2 | 1–2 (A) | 3–0 (H) |
| (France) Auxerre | 2–2 (p) | 2–0 (H) | 0–2 (a.e.t.) (A) | Semi-finals | (France) Paris Saint-Germain | 3–1 | 2–1 (H) | 1–0 (A) |

== Match details ==
=== First leg ===
5 May 1993

| Borussia Dortmund (Germany) | 1–3 | (Italy) Juventus |
|---|---|---|
| Rummenigge 2' | Report | D. Baggio 27'; R. Baggio 30', 74' |

Westfalenstadion, Dortmund
Attendance: 37,900
Referee: Sándor Puhl (Hungary)

| Borussia Dortmund | Juventus |

| GK | 1 | (Germany) Stefan Klos |
| DF | 2 | (Germany) Knut Reinhardt |
| DF | 3 | (Germany) Thomas Franck | | (substituted off) 46' |
| DF | 4 | (Germany) Bodo Schmidt |
| DF | 5 | (Germany) Uwe Grauer |
| DF | 6 | (Germany) Michael Lusch |
| MF | 7 | (Germany) Stefan Reuter |
| MF | 8 | (Germany) Michael Zorc (c) | | (substituted off) 70' |
| MF | 11 | (Germany) Gerhard Poschner |
| FW | 10 | (Germany) Michael Rummenigge | (yellow card) 28' |
| FW | 9 | (Switzerland) Stéphane Chapuisat |
Substitutes:
| GK | 12 | (Germany) Dirk Galeski |
| FW | 13 | (Germany) Frank Mill | | (substituted on) 46' |
| MF | 14 | (Germany) Steffen Karl | | (substituted on) 70' |
| MF | 15 | (Germany) René Tretschok |
| FW | 16 | (Germany) Lothar Sippel |
Manager:
(Germany) Ottmar Hitzfeld

| GK | 1 | (Italy) Angelo Peruzzi |
| RB | 2 | (Italy) Massimo Carrera |
| CB | 5 | (Germany) Jürgen Kohler |
| CB | 6 | (Brazil) Júlio César |
| LB | 3 | (Italy) Marco De Marchi |
| RM | 4 | (Italy) Dino Baggio |
| CM | 8 | (Italy) Giancarlo Marocchi | (yellow card) 72' |
| CM | 11 | (Germany) Andreas Möller | | (substituted off) 88' |
| LM | 7 | (Italy) Antonio Conte | (yellow card) 47' |
| RF | 9 | (Italy) Gianluca Vialli |
| LF | 10 | (Italy) Roberto Baggio (c) | | (substituted off) 76' |
Substitutes:
| GK | 12 | (Italy) Michelangelo Rampulla |
| CM | 13 | (Italy) Massimiliano Giacobbo |
| CB | 14 | (Italy) Roberto Galia | | (substituted on) 88' |
| LF | 15 | (Italy) Paolo Di Canio | | (substituted on) 76' |
| RF | 16 | (Italy) Fabrizio Ravanelli |
Manager:
(Italy) Giovanni Trapattoni

=== Second leg ===
19 May 1993

| Juventus (Italy) | 3–0 | (Germany) Borussia Dortmund |
|---|---|---|
| D. Baggio 5', 43'; Möller 65' | Report |

Stadio delle Alpi, Turin
Attendance: 62,781
Referee: John Blankenstein (Netherlands)

| Juventus | Borussia Dortmund |

| GK | 1 | (Italy) Angelo Peruzzi |
| RB | 3 | (Italy) Moreno Torricelli | | (substituted off) 67' |
| CB | 6 | (Brazil) Júlio César |
| CB | 5 | (Germany) Jürgen Kohler |
| LB | 2 | (Italy) Massimo Carrera |
| RM | 8 | (Italy) Dino Baggio |
| CM | 7 | (Italy) Roberto Galia | (yellow card) 53' |
| CM | 4 | (Italy) Marco De Marchi | (yellow card) 43' |
| LM | 11 | (Germany) Andreas Möller |
| RF | 9 | (Italy) Gianluca Vialli | | (substituted off) 81' |
| LF | 10 | (Italy) Roberto Baggio (c) |
Substitutes:
| GK | 12 | (Italy) Michelangelo Rampulla |
| CM | 13 | (Italy) Giancarlo Marocchi |
| LB | 14 | (Italy) Alessandro Dal Canto |
| LF | 15 | (Italy) Paolo Di Canio | | (substituted on) 67' |
| RF | 16 | (Italy) Fabrizio Ravanelli | | (substituted on) 81' |
Manager:
(Italy) Giovanni Trapattoni

| GK | 1 | (Germany) Stefan Klos |
| DF | 2 | (Germany) Knut Reinhardt |
| DF | 5 | (Australia) Ned Zelic | (yellow card) 60' |
| DF | 3 | (Germany) Bodo Schmidt |
| DF | 4 | (Germany) Michael Schulz |
| MF | 6 | (Germany) Gerhard Poschner |
| MF | 7 | (Germany) Stefan Reuter | | (substituted off) 67' |
| MF | 8 | (Germany) Steffen Karl |
| FW | 9 | (Germany) Lothar Sippel |
| MF | 10 | (Germany) Michael Rummenigge (c) | | (substituted off) 42' |
| FW | 11 | (Germany) Frank Mill |
Substitutes:
| GK | 12 | (Germany) Dirk Galeski |
| DF | 13 | (Germany) Uwe Grauer |
| MF | 14 | (Germany) Thomas Franck | | (substituted on) 42' |
| DF | 15 | (Germany) Michael Lusch | | (substituted on) 67' |
| FW | 16 | (Germany) Ulf Raschke |
Manager:
(Germany) Ottmar Hitzfeld

== See also ==
- 1993 UEFA Champions League final
- 1993 European Cup Winners' Cup final
- 1997 UEFA Champions League final – contested between same teams
- Borussia Dortmund in international football
- Juventus FC in international football
- 1992–93 Borussia Dortmund season
- 1992–93 Juventus FC season
