= Rummenigge =

Rummenigge is a surname. Notable people with the surname include:

- Karl-Heinz Rummenigge (born 1955), German former footballer and football executive
- Michael Rummenigge (born 1964), German former footballer, younger brother of Karl-Heinz
