= Robert Nikolic =

German footballer

Personal information
- Date of birth: 1 August 1968 (age 58)
- Place of birth: Bonn, West Germany
- Height: 1.79 m (5 ft 10 in)
- Position: Defender

Youth career
- –1984: Bonner SC
- 1984–1988: Bayer Leverkusen

Senior career*
Years	Team	Apps	(Gls)
1988–1991	Borussia Dortmund	51	(0)
1991–1993	FC St. Pauli	56	(0)
1993–1997	Rot-Weiß Oberhausen		
1997–1999	KFC Uerdingen 05	59	(0)
1999	Mainz 05	1	(0)
2000	→ Darmstadt 98 (loan)	14	(0)
2000–2005	Mainz 05	105	(0)
- * Club domestic league appearances and goals

Robert Nikolic (born 1 August 1968) is a German former professional footballer who played as a defender. He spent four seasons in the Bundesliga with Borussia Dortmund and 1. FSV Mainz 05, notably spending 13 years out of the top flight before making a return.

== Honours ==
Borussia Dortmund

- DFB-Pokal: 1988–89
