= 1986–87 Bundesliga =

24th season of the Bundesliga

Bundesliga
- Season: 1986–87
- Dates: 8 August 1986 – 17 June 1987
- Champions: Bayern Munich; 9th Bundesliga title 10th German title
- Relegated: Fortuna Düsseldorf; SpVgg Blau-Weiß 1890 Berlin
- European Cup: FC Bayern Munich
- Cup Winners' Cup: Hamburger SV
- UEFA Cup: Borussia Mönchengladbach; Borussia Dortmund; SV Werder Bremen; Bayer 04 Leverkusen
- Matches: 306
- Goals: 990 (3.24 per match)
- Average goals/game: 3.24
- Top goalscorer: Uwe Rahn (24)
- Biggest home win: Dortmund 7–0 SpVgg Blau-Weiß 1890 Berlin (26 September 1986)
- Biggest away win: Bremen 1–7 M'gladbach (21 March 1987)
- Highest scoring: 1. FC Nürnberg 7–2 SpVgg Blau-Weiß 1890 Berlin (9 goals) (15 November 1986); M'gladbach 7–2 Mannheim (9 goals) (25 April 1987)

The 1986–87 Bundesliga was the 24th season of the Bundesliga, the premier football league in West Germany. It began on 8 August 1986 and ended on 17 June 1987. FC Bayern Munich were the defending champions.

== Competition modus ==
Every team played two games against each other team, one at home and one away. Teams received two points for a win and one point for a draw. If two or more teams were tied on points, places were determined by goal difference and, if still tied, by goals scored. The team with the most points were crowned champions while the two teams with the fewest points were relegated to 2. Bundesliga. The third-to-last team had to compete in a two-legged relegation/promotion play-off against the third-placed team from 2. Bundesliga.

== Team changes to 1985–86 ==
1. FC Saarbrücken and Hannover 96 were directly relegated to the 2. Bundesliga after finishing in the last two places. They were replaced by FC Homburg and SpVgg Blau-Weiß 1890 Berlin. Relegation/promotion play-off participant Borussia Dortmund won a decisive third match, which had become necessary after the regular two-legged series ended in an aggregated tie, against SC Fortuna Köln and thus retained their Bundesliga status.

== Team overview ==
Location of teams in Bundesliga 1986–87

Club	Location	Ground	Capacity
SpVgg Blau-Weiß 1890 Berlin	West Berlin	Olympiastadion	76,000
VfL Bochum	Bochum	Ruhrstadion	40,000
SV Werder Bremen	Bremen	Weserstadion	32,000
Borussia Dortmund	Dortmund	Westfalenstadion	54,000
Fortuna Düsseldorf	Düsseldorf	Rheinstadion	59,600
Eintracht Frankfurt	Frankfurt	Waldstadion	62,000
Hamburger SV	Hamburg	Volksparkstadion	62,000
FC Homburg	Homburg	Waldstadion	24,000
1. FC Kaiserslautern	Kaiserslautern	Fritz-Walter-Stadion	42,000
1. FC Köln	Cologne	Müngersdorfer Stadion	61,000
Bayer 04 Leverkusen	Leverkusen	Ulrich-Haberland-Stadion	20,000
SV Waldhof Mannheim	Ludwigshafen	Südweststadion	75,000
Borussia Mönchengladbach	Mönchengladbach	Bökelbergstadion	34,500
FC Bayern Munich	Munich	Olympiastadion	80,000
1. FC Nürnberg	Nuremberg	Städtisches Stadion	64,238
FC Schalke 04	Gelsenkirchen	Parkstadion	70,000
VfB Stuttgart	Stuttgart	Neckarstadion	72,000
Bayer 05 Uerdingen	Krefeld	Grotenburg-Stadion	35,700

- ^1 Waldhof Mannheim played their matches in nearby Ludwigshafen because their own ground did not fulfil Bundesliga requirements.

== League table ==
Pos	Team	Pld	W	D	L	GF	GA	GD	Pts	Qualification or relegation
1	Bayern Munich (C)	34	20	13	1	67	31	+36	53	Qualification to European Cup first round
2	Hamburger SV	34	19	9	6	69	37	+32	47	Qualification to Cup Winners' Cup first round
3	Borussia Mönchengladbach	34	18	7	9	74	44	+30	43	Qualification to UEFA Cup first round (Note: As Hamburger SV qualified for the Cup Winners' Cup, their UEFA Cup spot was transferred to Leverkusen.)
4	Borussia Dortmund	34	15	10	9	70	50	+20	40	Qualification to UEFA Cup first round
5	Werder Bremen	34	17	6	11	65	54	+11	40	Qualification to UEFA Cup first round
6	Bayer Leverkusen	34	16	7	11	56	38	+18	39	Qualification to UEFA Cup first round
7	1. FC Kaiserslautern	34	15	7	12	64	51	+13	37	
8	Bayer 05 Uerdingen	34	12	11	11	51	49	+2	35	
9	1. FC Nürnberg	34	12	11	11	62	62	0	35	
10	1. FC Köln	34	13	9	12	50	53	−3	35	
11	VfL Bochum	34	9	14	11	52	44	+8	32	
12	VfB Stuttgart	34	13	6	15	55	49	+6	32	
13	Schalke 04	34	12	8	14	50	58	−8	32	
14	Waldhof Mannheim	34	10	8	16	52	71	−19	28	
15	Eintracht Frankfurt	34	8	9	17	42	53	−11	25	
16	FC 08 Homburg (O)	34	6	9	19	33	79	−46	21	Qualification to relegation play-offs
17	Fortuna Düsseldorf (R)	34	7	6	21	42	91	−49	20	Relegation to 2. Bundesliga
18	Blau-Weiß 90 Berlin (R)	34	3	12	19	36	76	−40	18	Relegation to 2. Bundesliga

Source: www.dfb.de
Rules for classification: 1) points; 2) goal difference; 3) number of goals scored.
(C) Champions; (O) Play-off winners; (R) Relegated

== Results ==
Home \ Away	BWB	BOC	SVW	BVB	F95	SGE	HSV	HOM	FCK	KOE	B04	WMA	BMG	FCB	FCN	S04	VFB	B05
Blau-Weiß 90 Berlin	—	0–0	1–4	1–1	1–2	2–2	1–3	2–2	1–4	1–1	0–1	4–1	3–2	1–1	1–4	0–0	0–2	1–1
VfL Bochum	5–1	—	1–1	0–0	2–2	2–0	1–1	0–0	3–1	3–1	2–1	6–1	1–1	1–2	0–1	1–1	0–1	2–1
Werder Bremen	2–0	0–0	—	5–0	5–2	4–1	2–1	6–0	1–0	2–1	1–0	4–2	1–7	1–1	5–3	0–0	1–0	5–1
Borussia Dortmund	7–0	3–2	2–1	—	4–1	1–0	4–3	3–0	2–0	1–1	0–0	6–0	0–2	2–2	2–2	1–0	1–2	1–1
Fortuna Düsseldorf	3–1	0–4	2–1	0–4	—	3–3	3–2	1–0	1–3	0–4	2–3	2–0	1–1	0–3	1–1	3–4	1–0	1–1
Eintracht Frankfurt	1–3	1–1	2–2	0–4	5–0	—	1–3	4–0	2–2	1–2	1–0	2–1	4–0	0–0	1–0	0–1	3–1	1–0
Hamburger SV	2–1	1–1	3–0	4–2	4–1	2–0	—	3–1	2–0	1–0	2–1	1–0	3–1	1–2	1–1	4–0	2–0	2–1
FC Homburg	2–1	3–1	0–1	2–2	3–1	1–1	1–1	—	1–1	1–3	1–2	2–1	0–2	2–2	2–0	1–1	2–1	0–2
1. FC Kaiserslautern	2–0	4–1	1–3	2–3	3–1	2–1	0–4	5–0	—	5–1	1–1	3–2	1–1	1–1	2–1	5–1	3–0	1–0
1. FC Köln	1–1	1–0	3–0	2–0	1–0	0–0	1–1	3–0	2–2	—	1–4	2–1	2–4	1–1	3–1	3–2	0–0	1–2
Bayer Leverkusen	2–2	2–1	4–1	3–2	5–0	2–0	0–1	4–2	1–0	0–1	—	0–0	0–2	0–0	2–0	4–2	4–1	1–4
Waldhof Mannheim	1–1	0–0	1–0	2–1	1–1	2–1	2–2	5–1	4–3	2–0	2–1	—	1–1	3–3	3–0	2–0	3–2	2–3
Borussia Mönchengladbach	2–1	2–1	1–2	2–2	4–1	1–1	0–3	5–0	0–1	3–1	2–1	7–2	—	0–1	4–0	3–1	4–0	2–0
Bayern Munich	2–0	3–2	3–2	2–2	3–0	2–1	3–1	3–0	3–0	3–0	0–3	3–0	3–1	—	4–0	1–0	1–0	2–2
1. FC Nürnberg	7–2	3–3	5–1	1–2	4–3	1–0	3–3	2–2	2–1	1–1	1–1	1–1	2–0	1–2	—	2–1	2–1	1–1
Schalke 04	3–0	0–0	1–0	2–1	4–2	3–1	1–1	4–0	3–2	2–4	1–2	3–1	1–2	2–2	2–4	—	2–1	2–1
VfB Stuttgart	1–1	2–4	4–0	3–0	3–0	4–1	1–1	4–0	1–1	5–1	1–0	2–1	2–4	1–3	1–1	4–0	—	2–0
Bayer Uerdingen	2–1	3–1	1–1	2–4	4–1	1–0	1–0	2–1	1–2	3–1	1–1	3–2	1–1	0–0	3–4	0–0	2–2	—

Source: DFB
Legend: Blue = home team win; Yellow = draw; Red = away team win.

== Relegation play-offs ==
FC Homburg and third-placed 2. Bundesliga team FC St. Pauli had to compete in a two-legged relegation/promotion play-off. Homburg won 4–3 on aggregate and retained their Bundesliga status.

21 June 1987

FC Homburg	3–1	FC St. Pauli
Brendel 8', 37'; Schäfer 21'	Report link (in German)	Klaus 3'

Waldstadion, Homburg (Saar)
Attendance: 10,000
Referee: Manfred Neuner (Leimen)

25 June 1987

FC St. Pauli	2–1	FC Homburg
Gronau 71'; Studer 88'	Report link (in German)	Wójcicki 86' (pen.)

Millerntor, Hamburg
Attendance: 18,500
Referee: Dieter Pauly (Rheydt)

== Top goalscorers ==
24 goals

- (Germany) Uwe Rahn (Borussia Mönchengladbach)

23 goals

- (Germany) Fritz Walter (SV Waldhof Mannheim)

22 goals

- (Germany) Rudi Völler (SV Werder Bremen)

20 goals

- (Germany) Norbert Dickel (Borussia Dortmund)

17 goals

- (Germany) Frank Hartmann (1. FC Kaiserslautern)
- (Germany) Frank Mill (Borussia Dortmund)

16 goals

- (Germany) Jürgen Klinsmann (VfB Stuttgart)
- (Germany) Harald Kohr (1. FC Kaiserslautern)

15 goals

- (Germany) Herbert Waas (Bayer 04 Leverkusen)

14 goals

- (Germany) Klaus Allofs (1. FC Köln)
- (Norway) Jørn Andersen (1. FC Nürnberg)
- (Germany) Lothar Matthäus (FC Bayern Munich)
- (Germany) Christian Schreier (Bayer 04 Leverkusen)
- (Germany) Wolfram Wuttke (1. FC Kaiserslautern)
- (Germany) Michael Zorc (Borussia Dortmund)

== Champion squad ==
FC Bayern Munich
Goalkeeper: Jean-Marie Pfaff (Belgium) (34).

Defenders: Hans Pflügler (32 / 7); Norbert Eder (32 / 1); Andreas Brehme (31 / 4); Klaus Augenthaler (captain; 25 / 4); Holger Willmer (9); Uli Bayerschmidt (1).
Midfielders: Norbert Nachtweih (East Germany) (33 / 3); Lothar Matthäus (31 / 14); Hansi Flick (19 / 1); Hans Dorfner (17 / 1); Helmut Winklhofer (17).
Forwards: Michael Rummenigge (31 / 8); Roland Wohlfarth (27 / 11); Dieter Hoeneß (26 / 7); Ludwig Kögl (21 / 2); Lars Lunde (Denmark) (21 / 2); Reinhold Mathy (11 / 2); Frank Hartmann (1).
(league appearances and goals listed in brackets)

Manager: Udo Lattek.

On the roster but have not played in a league game: Raimond Aumann; Robert Dekeyser, Alexander Kutschera.

== See also ==
- 1986–87 2. Bundesliga
- 1986–87 DFB-Pokal
