= 1988–89 Bundesliga =

26th season of the Bundesliga

Bundesliga
- Season: 1988–89
- Dates: 22 July 1988 – 17 June 1989
- Champions: Bayern Munich; 10th Bundesliga title 11th German title
- Relegated: Stuttgarter Kickers; Hannover 96
- European Cup: FC Bayern Munich
- Cup Winners' Cup: Borussia Dortmund
- UEFA Cup: 1. FC Köln; SV Werder Bremen; Hamburger SV; VfB Stuttgart
- Goals: 838
- Average goals/game: 2.74
- Top goalscorer: Thomas Allofs (17)
- Biggest home win: K'lautern 6–0 St. Kickers (3 September 1988); Dortmund 6–0 Frankfurt (26 November 1988)
- Biggest away win: St. Kickers 0–6 Bremen (16 November 1988)
- Highest scoring: Uerdingen 7–3 Hannover (10 goals) (25 May 1989)

The 1988–89 Bundesliga was the 26th season of the Bundesliga, the premier football league in West Germany. It began on 22 July 1988 and ended on 17 June 1989. SV Werder Bremen were the defending champions.

== Competition modus ==
Every team played two games against each other team, one at home and one away. Teams received two points for a win and one point for a draw. If two or more teams were tied on points, places were determined by goal difference and, if still tied, by goals scored. The team with the most points were crowned champions while the two teams with the fewest points were relegated to 2. Bundesliga. The third-to-last team had to compete in a two-legged relegation/promotion play-off against the third-placed team from 2. Bundesliga.

== Team changes to 1987–88 ==
FC Homburg and FC Schalke 04 were directly relegated to the 2. Bundesliga after finishing in the last two places. They were replaced by FC St. Pauli and Stuttgarter Kickers. Relegation/promotion play-off participant SV Waldhof Mannheim won the penalty shootout of a decisive third match, which had become necessary after the regular two-legged series ended in an aggregated tie, against SV Darmstadt 98 and thus retained their Bundesliga status.

== Team overview ==
Location of teams in Bundesliga 1988–89

| Club | Location | Ground | Capacity |
|---|---|---|---|
| VfL Bochum | Bochum | Ruhrstadion | 40,000 |
| SV Werder Bremen | Bremen | Weserstadion | 32,000 |
| Borussia Dortmund | Dortmund | Westfalenstadion | 54,000 |
| Eintracht Frankfurt | Frankfurt | Waldstadion | 62,000 |
| Hamburger SV | Hamburg | Volksparkstadion | 62,000 |
| Hannover 96 | Hanover | Niedersachsenstadion | 60,400 |
| 1. FC Kaiserslautern | Kaiserslautern | Fritz-Walter-Stadion | 42,000 |
| Karlsruher SC | Karlsruhe | Wildparkstadion | 50,000 |
| 1. FC Köln | Cologne | Müngersdorfer Stadion | 61,000 |
| Bayer 04 Leverkusen | Leverkusen | Ulrich-Haberland-Stadion | 20,000 |
| SV Waldhof Mannheim | Ludwigshafen | Südweststadion | 75,000 |
| Borussia Mönchengladbach | Mönchengladbach | Bökelbergstadion | 34,500 |
| FC Bayern Munich | Munich | Olympiastadion | 80,000 |
| 1. FC Nürnberg | Nuremberg | Städtisches Stadion | 64,238 |
| FC St. Pauli | Hamburg | Stadion am Millerntor | 18,000 |
| Stuttgarter Kickers | Stuttgart | Neckarstadion | 72,000 |
| VfB Stuttgart | Stuttgart | Neckarstadion | 72,000 |
| Bayer 05 Uerdingen | Krefeld | Grotenburg-Stadion | 35,700 |

- ^1 Waldhof Mannheim played their matches in nearby Ludwigshafen because their own ground did not fulfil Bundesliga requirements.

== League table ==
| Pos | Team | Pld | W | D | L | GF | GA | GD | Pts | Qualification or relegation |
|---|---|---|---|---|---|---|---|---|---|---|
| 1 | Bayern Munich (C) | 34 | 19 | 12 | 3 | 67 | 26 | +41 | 50 | Qualification to European Cup first round |
| 2 | 1. FC Köln | 34 | 18 | 9 | 7 | 58 | 30 | +28 | 45 | Qualification to UEFA Cup first round |
| 3 | Werder Bremen | 34 | 18 | 8 | 8 | 55 | 32 | +23 | 44 | Qualification to UEFA Cup first round |
| 4 | Hamburger SV | 34 | 17 | 9 | 8 | 60 | 36 | +24 | 43 | Qualification to UEFA Cup first round |
| 5 | VfB Stuttgart | 34 | 16 | 7 | 11 | 58 | 49 | +9 | 39 | Qualification to UEFA Cup first round |
| 6 | Borussia Mönchengladbach | 34 | 12 | 14 | 8 | 44 | 43 | +1 | 38 | |
| 7 | Borussia Dortmund | 34 | 12 | 13 | 9 | 56 | 40 | +16 | 37 | Qualification to Cup Winners' Cup first round |
| 8 | Bayer Leverkusen | 34 | 10 | 14 | 10 | 45 | 44 | +1 | 34 | |
| 9 | 1. FC Kaiserslautern | 34 | 10 | 13 | 11 | 47 | 44 | +3 | 33 | |
| 10 | FC St. Pauli | 34 | 9 | 14 | 11 | 41 | 42 | −1 | 32 | |
| 11 | Karlsruher SC | 34 | 12 | 8 | 14 | 48 | 51 | −3 | 32 | |
| 12 | Waldhof Mannheim | 34 | 10 | 11 | 13 | 43 | 52 | −9 | 31 | |
| 13 | Bayer 05 Uerdingen | 34 | 10 | 11 | 13 | 50 | 60 | −10 | 31 | |
| 14 | 1. FC Nürnberg | 34 | 8 | 10 | 16 | 36 | 54 | −18 | 26 | |
| 15 | VfL Bochum | 34 | 9 | 8 | 17 | 37 | 57 | −20 | 26 | |
| 16 | Eintracht Frankfurt (O) | 34 | 8 | 10 | 16 | 30 | 53 | −23 | 26 | Qualification to relegation play-offs |
| 17 | Stuttgarter Kickers (R) | 34 | 10 | 6 | 18 | 41 | 68 | −27 | 26 | Relegation to 2. Bundesliga |
| 18 | Hannover 96 (R) | 34 | 4 | 11 | 19 | 36 | 71 | −35 | 19 | Relegation to 2. Bundesliga |

Source: www.dfb.de
Rules for classification: 1) points; 2) goal difference; 3) number of goals scored.
(C) Champions; (O) Play-off winners; (R) Relegated

== Results ==
| Home \ Away | BOC | SVW | BVB | SGE | HSV | H96 | FCK | KSC | KOE | B04 | WMA | BMG | FCB | FCN | STP | SKI | VFB | B05 |
|---|---|---|---|---|---|---|---|---|---|---|---|---|---|---|---|---|---|---|
| VfL Bochum | — | 0–1 | 2–2 | 1–0 | 2–1 | 1–3 | 2–0 | 2–0 | 1–3 | 2–4 | 2–2 | 1–2 | 0–0 | 1–0 | 0–0 | 2–1 | 1–0 | 1–1 |
| Werder Bremen | 2–0 | — | 2–0 | 2–0 | 2–1 | 1–0 | 1–0 | 3–1 | 1–2 | 3–1 | 2–1 | 2–0 | 2–2 | 2–1 | 0–0 | 4–0 | 3–0 | 3–1 |
| Borussia Dortmund | 2–1 | 3–1 | — | 6–0 | 2–2 | 4–0 | 1–1 | 3–2 | 0–4 | 2–1 | 1–2 | 0–0 | 1–1 | 4–0 | 0–0 | 1–1 | 1–2 | 4–2 |
| Eintracht Frankfurt | 1–1 | 0–0 | 2–1 | — | 0–1 | 1–0 | 3–2 | 1–0 | 1–0 | 1–1 | 0–0 | 1–1 | 2–2 | 1–0 | 1–1 | 1–2 | 1–3 | 0–2 |
| Hamburger SV | 3–1 | 2–0 | 0–0 | 2–1 | — | 4–1 | 1–1 | 1–1 | 0–1 | 1–1 | 5–1 | 1–2 | 0–1 | 3–2 | 1–1 | 3–0 | 2–1 | 3–0 |
| Hannover 96 | 3–2 | 2–2 | 1–5 | 1–1 | 2–3 | — | 0–0 | 2–3 | 2–2 | 2–2 | 0–2 | 0–1 | 0–0 | 2–2 | 2–2 | 3–4 | 2–0 | 0–5 |
| 1. FC Kaiserslautern | 3–0 | 0–0 | 3–2 | 3–0 | 0–0 | 0–0 | — | 1–2 | 1–1 | 0–0 | 0–3 | 0–0 | 1–1 | 2–1 | 1–0 | 6–0 | 6–1 | 2–0 |
| Karlsruher SC | 1–3 | 1–0 | 0–0 | 1–3 | 2–2 | 2–0 | 4–1 | — | 0–0 | 2–3 | 2–1 | 2–2 (Note: The Karlsruher SC v Borussia Mönchengladbach match from 19 November 1988, which finished with a score of 3–1, was annulled by the DFB on 21 December 1988 and was required to be replayed due to Borussia Mönchengladbach player Christian Hochstätter being hit by a projectile, requiring him to be substituted off. On 19 January 1989, the verdict was upheld on appeal. Karlsruher SC also received a one-match stadium ban (served on 18 February 1989 against Hannover 96). The replay took place on 22 February 1989 and finished with a score of 2–2.) | 2–2 | 1–1 | 3–1 | 1–0 | 2–0 | 0–1 |
| 1. FC Köln | 1–0 | 2–0 | 2–0 | 3–2 | 1–2 | 1–0 | 2–2 | 6–1 | — | 3–0 | 1–0 | 3–1 | 1–3 | 1–1 | 4–2 | 5–1 | 3–0 | 1–1 |
| Bayer Leverkusen | 1–1 | 1–0 | 2–0 | 2–2 | 1–2 | 3–1 | 0–1 | 1–0 | 0–0 | — | 3–0 | 3–1 | 1–1 | 3–0 | 2–2 | 1–3 | 0–0 | 2–2 |
| Waldhof Mannheim | 2–2 | 1–1 | 0–3 | 1–0 | 0–0 | 1–1 | 0–4 | 2–0 | 2–1 | 1–1 | — | 4–1 | 0–3 | 2–1 | 2–1 | 2–2 | 3–4 | 3–3 |
| Borussia Mönchengladbach | 2–0 | 4–1 | 1–1 | 2–1 | 0–4 | 2–0 | 4–1 | 1–1 | 1–0 | 2–0 | 1–1 | — | 2–1 | 1–1 | 2–2 | 1–1 | 2–2 | 3–0 |
| Bayern Munich | 5–0 | 0–0 | 1–1 | 3–0 | 1–0 | 4–0 | 5–1 | 3–2 | 2–0 | 2–0 | 1–0 | 3–0 | — | 1–0 | 2–1 | 3–0 | 3–3 | 5–0 |
| 1. FC Nürnberg | 3–1 | 0–1 | 1–1 | 1–1 | 1–4 | 1–0 | 1–1 | 1–3 | 0–2 | 1–1 | 1–0 | 0–0 | 2–1 | — | 5–3 | 3–3 | 1–0 | 1–0 |
| FC St. Pauli | 1–0 | 1–3 | 1–0 | 2–0 | 1–2 | 1–1 | 1–1 | 1–0 | 0–1 | 2–0 | 2–1 | 1–1 | 0–0 | 0–1 | — | 1–0 | 2–1 | 5–1 |
| Stuttgarter Kickers | 1–2 | 0–6 | 1–2 | 0–1 | 2–0 | 0–1 | 2–0 | 1–3 | 0–0 | 1–3 | 1–3 | 3–0 | 2–0 | 1–0 | 2–2 | — | 0–2 | 3–1 |
| VfB Stuttgart | 3–1 | 3–3 | 1–3 | 2–0 | 4–2 | 2–1 | 3–1 | 2–0 | 2–0 | 0–0 | 2–0 | 2–1 | 1–2 | 4–0 | 2–1 | 4–0 | — | 2–2 |
| Bayer Uerdingen | 3–1 | 2–1 | 0–0 | 4–1 | 0–2 | 7–3 | 3–1 | 0–3 | 1–1 | 3–1 | 0–0 | 0–0 | 1–3 | 3–2 | 0–0 | 1–3 | 0–0 | — |

Source: DFB
Legend: Blue = home team win; Yellow = draw; Red = away team win.

== Relegation play-offs ==
Eintracht Frankfurt and third-placed 2. Bundesliga team 1. FC Saarbrücken had to compete in a two-legged relegation/promotion play-off. Frankfurt won 3–2 on aggregate and retained their Bundesliga status.

21 June 1989

| Eintracht Frankfurt | 2–0 | 1. FC Saarbrücken |
|---|---|---|
| Andersen 26'; Binz 60' | Report link (in German) |

Waldstadion, Frankfurt am Main
Attendance: 40,000
Referee: Wolf-Günter Wiesel (Ottbergen)

25 June 1989

| 1. FC Saarbrücken | 2–1 | Eintracht Frankfurt |
|---|---|---|
| Yeboah 10', 76' | Report link (in German) | Schulz 51' |

Ludwigspark, Saarbrücken
Attendance: 35,000
Referee: Dieter Pauly (Rheydt)

== Top goalscorers ==
17 goals

- (Germany) Thomas Allofs (1. FC Köln)
- (Germany) Roland Wohlfarth (FC Bayern Munich)

15 goals

- (Germany) Uwe Bein (Hamburger SV)

13 goals

- (Germany) Hans-Jörg Criens (Borussia Mönchengladbach)
- (Germany) Jürgen Klinsmann (VfB Stuttgart)
- (Germany) Harald Kohr (1. FC Kaiserslautern)
- (Germany) Stefan Kuntz (Bayer 05 Uerdingen)
- (Germany) Uwe Leifeld (VfL Bochum)
- (Germany) Frank Neubarth (SV Werder Bremen)
- (Germany) Karl-Heinz Riedle (SV Werder Bremen)
- (Germany) Fritz Walter (VfB Stuttgart)
- (Germany) Jürgen Wegmann (FC Bayern Munich)

== Champion squad ==
FC Bayern Munich
Goalkeeper: Raimond Aumann (34).

Defenders: Hans Pflügler (34 / 4); Klaus Augenthaler (captain; 31 / 6); Norbert Nachtweih (East Germany) (29 / 3); Roland Grahammer (28); Erland Johnsen (Norway) (13).
Midfielders: Olaf Thon (32 / 8); Ludwig Kögl (32); Stefan Reuter (32); Hansi Flick (30 / 2); Hans Dorfner (22 / 6); Armin Eck (21 / 1); Helmut Winklhofer (1).
Forwards: Roland Wohlfarth (33 / 17); Jürgen Wegmann (31 / 13); Johnny Ekström (Sweden) (23 / 7).
(league appearances and goals listed in brackets)

Manager: Jupp Heynckes.

On the roster but have not played in a league game: Sven Scheuer; Uli Bayerschmidt; Matthias Hamann.

== Attendances ==
| No. | Team | Attendance | Change | Highest |
|---|---|---|---|---|
| 1 | Borussia Dortmund | 30,572 | 3.9% | 54,000 |
| 2 | Bayern München | 30,412 | 8.5% | 68,000 |
| 3 | VfB Stuttgart | 26,876 | 2.2% | 68,900 |
| 4 | 1. FC Kaiserslautern | 21,986 | 2.2% | 38,300 |
| 5 | FC St. Pauli | 21,085 | 147.4% | 53,950 |
| 6 | 1. FC Köln | 20,941 | -6.6% | 60,000 |
| 7 | Werder Bremen | 20,591 | -7.1% | 37,204 |
| 8 | Karlsruher SC | 20,559 | -4.9% | 40,000 |
| 9 | 1. FC Nürnberg | 18,929 | -29.2% | 42,000 |
| 10 | Hamburger SV | 17,615 | 10.0% | 48,000 |
| 11 | Eintracht Frankfurt | 17,326 | -18.6% | 47,000 |
| 12 | VfL Bochum | 15,059 | -11.4% | 36,000 |
| 13 | Hannover 96 | 14,325 | -31.7% | 29,900 |
| 14 | Borussia Mönchengladbach | 13,294 | -6.7% | 34,500 |
| 15 | Waldhof Mannheim | 13,007 | -9.6% | 28,000 |
| 16 | Stuttgarter Kickers | 12,296 | 102.8% | 32,000 |
| 17 | Bayer Leverkusen | 12,253 | 28.8% | 24,000 |
| 18 | Bayer 05 Uerdingen | 11,418 | 6.6% | 28,000 |

== See also ==
- 1988–89 2. Bundesliga
- 1988–89 DFB-Pokal
