= 1989 DFB-Supercup =

- Match programme cover
Bayern Munich	Borussia Dortmund
3	4
- Date: 25 July 1989
- Venue: Fritz-Walter-Stadion, Kaiserslautern
- Referee: Hans-Peter Dellwing (Trier)
- Attendance: 16,000

The 1989 DFB-Supercup was the third DFB-Supercup, an annual football match contested by the winners of the previous season's Bundesliga and DFB-Pokal competitions.

The match was played at the Fritz-Walter-Stadion, Kaiserslautern, and contested by league champions Bayern Munich and cup winners Borussia Dortmund.

== Teams ==
Team	Qualification	Previous appearances (bold indicates winners)
Bayern Munich	1988–89 Bundesliga champions	1 (**1987**)
Borussia Dortmund	1988–89 DFB-Pokal winners	None

== Match ==
=== Details ===
25 July 1989
20:00 CET

Bayern Munich	3–4	Borussia Dortmund
McInally 21'; Grahammer 42'; Mihajlović 66'	Report	Breitzke 40', 56'; Wegmann 64'; Möller 88'

Fritz-Walter-Stadion, Kaiserslautern
Attendance: 16,000
Referee: Hans-Peter Dellwing (Trier)

**Bayern Munich**	**Borussia Dortmund**

GK	1	(West Germany) Raimond Aumann
SW	5	(West Germany) Klaus Augenthaler (c)
CB	3	(West Germany) Roland Grahammer
CB	6	(West Germany) Jürgen Kohler
RWB	2	(West Germany) Stefan Reuter
LWB	4	(West Germany) Hans Pflügler
CM	7	(West Germany) Hansi Flick	(substituted off) 46'
CM	10	(West Germany) Olaf Thon
CM	8	(West Germany) Ludwig Kögl
CF	11	(Scotland) Alan McInally
CF	9	(Socialist Federal Republic of Yugoslavia) Radmilo Mihajlović
Substitutes:
MF	13	(West Germany) Hans Dorfner	(substituted on) 46'
Manager:
(West Germany) Jupp Heynckes

GK	1	(West Germany) Wolfgang de Beer	(substituted off) 76'
SW	2	(West Germany) Thomas Kroth
CB	5	(West Germany) Thomas Helmer
CB	3	(West Germany) Michael Schulz
RWB	4	(West Germany) Günter Breitzke
LWB	11	(West Germany) Michael Rummenigge
CM	8	(West Germany) Michael Zorc (c)
CM	10	(West Germany) Andreas Möller
CM	6	(Scotland) Murdo MacLeod	(substituted off) 46'
CF	9	(West Germany) Jürgen Wegmann
CF	7	(West Germany) Martin Driller
Substitutes:
GK	12	(West Germany) Rolf Meyer	(substituted on) 76'
DF	13	(West Germany) Günter Kutowski	(substituted on) 46'
Manager:
(West Germany) Horst Köppel

== See also ==
- 1989–90 Bundesliga
- 1989–90 DFB-Pokal
- Der Klassiker
