= Martin Driller =

German footballer

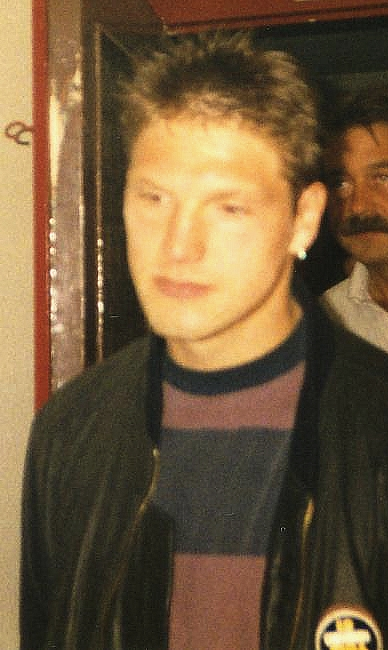
- Driller in 1992–93 season

Personal information
- Date of birth: 2 January 1970 (age 56)
- Place of birth: Paderborn, West Germany
- Height: 1.79 m (5 ft 10 in)
- Position: Forward

Youth career
- TuS Paderborn-Neuhaus

Senior career*
Years	Team	Apps	(Gls)
1989–1991	Borussia Dortmund	41	(6)
1991–1997	FC St. Pauli	49	(10)
1997–2004	1. FC Nürnberg	112	(29)
2005	SpVgg Bayreuth	18	(11)
2006	FC Ingolstadt 04		
- * Club domestic league appearances and goals

Martin Driller (born 2 January 1970) is a German former professional footballer who played as a forward.

== Honours ==
Borussia Dortmund

- DFL-Supercup: 1989
