= Stefan Sterath =

German footballer

Personal information
- Date of birth: 15 January 1967 (age 59)
- Place of birth: Neckarelz
- Height: 1.89 m (6 ft 2 in)
- Position: Midfielder

Senior career*
Years	Team	Apps	(Gls)
1987–1989	SV Sandhausen		
1989–1991	Borussia Dortmund		
1991–1992	Waldhof Mannheim		
1992–1993	Fortuna Düsseldorf		
1993–1996	SV Sandhausen		
1996–2000	SG Heidelberg-Kirchheim		
2000–2002	VfR Heilbronn		

Managerial career
- 2010–2016: SpVgg Neckarelz (assistant)
- * Club domestic league appearances and goals

Stefan Sterath (born 15 January 1967) is a German former footballer who played as a midfielder.
