= Frank Hartmann =

Frank Hartmann may refer to:

- Frank Hartmann (footballer, born August 1960), German footballer who played for Hannover 96 and FC Bayern Munich
- Frank Hartmann (footballer, born September 1960), German footballer who played for 1. FC Köln, FC Schalke 04, 1. FC Kaiserslautern and SG Wattenscheid 09
- Frank Hartmann (wrestler) (born 1949), East German wrestler who participated in the 1972 Olympics
