= Uli Bayerschmidt =

German footballer (born 1967)

Personal information
- Full name: Ulrich Bayerschmidt
- Date of birth: 3 March 1967 (age 59)
- Place of birth: Munich, West Germany
- Height: 1.83 m (6 ft 0 in)
- Position: Defender

Youth career
- 1975–1985: Bayern Munich

Senior career*
Years	Team	Apps	(Gls)
1985–1989	Bayern Munich (A)		
1986–1989	Bayern Munich	4	(1)
1989–1991	1. FC Nürnberg	41	(0)
1991–1994	Hertha BSC	83	(0)
1994–1996	Tennis Borussia Berlin	37	(2)
Total		165	(3)
- * Club domestic league appearances and goals

Uli Bayerschmidt (born 3 March 1967) is a German former professional footballer who played as a defender.

== Career ==
Born in Munich, Bayerschmidt began his career with Bayern Munich, and made his debut for the club in October 1986, as a substitute for Holger Willmer in a European Cup match against PSV Eindhoven. Bayern reached the competition's final that season, and Bayerschmidt was an unused substitute as they lost against FC Porto. They also won the Bundesliga title, with Bayerschmidt making one appearance, replacing Michael Rummenigge in a 3–2 win over Werder Bremen. He made a further three appearances the following year, and the last match of the season brought his first goal – he scored Bayern's second as they turned around a 3–0 deficit against Bayer Leverkusen to win 4–3. However, Werder Bremen had already wrapped up the title, so Bayern finished in second place.

Bayerschmidt only made one appearance for Bayern during the first half of the 1988–89 season, in a UEFA Cup match against Legia Warsaw, so he left during the winter break to sign for 1. FC Nürnberg. He made 41 appearances for Nürnberg in the next two years, but didn't feature in the first team after November 1990, and left at the end of the 1990–91 season to sign for Hertha BSC of the 2. Bundesliga. He made over 80 appearances for Hertha in the next three years, before signing for neighbours Tennis Borussia Berlin in 1994. He spent three years with TeBe, the last of which saw them win the Regionalliga Nordost title, but they were denied promotion to the 2. Bundesliga after a defeat in the playoff against VfB Oldenburg. Bayerschmidt retired from football at the end of the 1995–96 season.

== Honours ==
Bayern Munich

- Bundesliga: 1986–87
- European Cup runner-up: 1986–87
