= Nando (footballer, born 1966) =

Brazilian retired footballer

Personal information
- Full name: Fernando Pereira de Pinho Júnior
- Date of birth: 3 July 1966 (age 60)
- Place of birth: Brazil
- Position: Forward

Senior career*
Years	Team	Apps	(Gls)
-1988	Bangu Atlético Clube		
1989	Clube de Regatas do Flamengo		
1989-1992	Hamburger SV	65	(17)
1992-1995	Sport Club Internacional		
- * Club domestic league appearances and goals

Nando (born 3 July 1966 in Brazil) is a Brazilian retired footballer.
