= Helmut Hermann =

German footballer

Personal information
- Date of birth: 16 December 1966 (age 59)
- Place of birth: Karlsruhe, West Germany
- Height: 1.79 m (5 ft 10 in)
- Position: Striker

Youth career
- –1982: Karlsruher FV
- 1982–1984: Karlsruher SC

Senior career*
Years	Team	Apps	(Gls)
1984–1985	Karlsruher SC II		
1985–1993	Karlsruher SC	142	(29)
- * Club domestic league appearances and goals

Helmut Hermann (born 16 December 1966) is a retired German football player. Between 1987 and 1991, he made 129 appearances in the Bundesliga for Karlsruher SC, scoring 25 goals.

On 29 November 1991, during a match in Dortmund, he sustained his second knee injury and ended professional career but remained active in amateur football. In 2007, he returned to Karlsruher FV, and in 2015 he became a member of the club’s board of directors.

From 2000 to 2017, Hermann operated a football school in the Vorderpfalz municipality of Berg, near Karlsruhe, Germany.
