= Ulf Raschke =

German footballer

Personal information
- Date of birth: 23 July 1972 (age 54)
- Place of birth: Recklinghausen, West Germany
- Height: 1.86 m (6 ft 1 in)
- Position: Striker

Youth career
- 1. FC Recklinghausen

Senior career*
Years	Team	Apps	(Gls)
1991–1993	Borussia Dortmund II		
1991–1993	Borussia Dortmund	1	(0)
1993–1994	SC Verl		
1994–2002	Rot-Weiss Essen		
2002–2004	FC Gütersloh		
2004–2005	SC Verl		
2005–2006	SV Lippstadt 08	31	(13)
2006–2007	Delbrücker SC	25	(6)
2007–2009	RW Mastholte		
- * Club domestic league appearances and goals

Ulf Raschke (born 23 July 1972) is a German former professional footballer who played as a striker.

== Honours ==
- UEFA Cup finalist: 1992–93
