= Frank Mill =

German footballer (1958–2025)

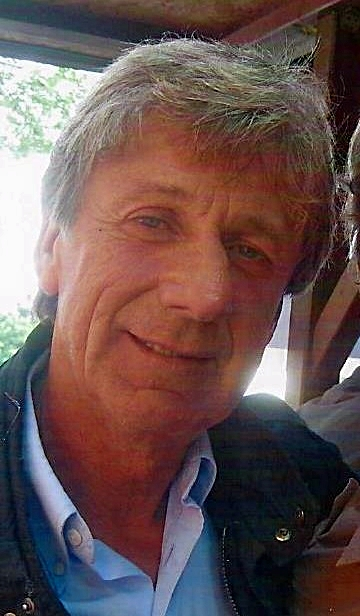
- Mill in 2013

Personal information
- Date of birth: 23 July 1958
- Place of birth: Essen, North Rhine-Westphalia, West Germany
- Date of death: 5 August 2025 (aged 67)
- Place of death: Essen, North Rhine-Westphalia, Germany
- Height: 1.76 m (5 ft 9 in)
- Position: Striker

Youth career
- 1966–1972: Eintracht Essen
- 1972–1976: Rot-Weiss Essen

Senior career*
Years	Team	Apps	(Gls)
1976–1981	Rot-Weiss Essen	120	(74)
1981–1986	Borussia Mönchengladbach	153	(71)
1986–1994	Borussia Dortmund	187	(47)
1994–1996	Fortuna Düsseldorf	55	(7)
Total		506	(201)

International career
1980	West Germany U-21	2	(0)
1983–1988	West Germany Olympic	20	(10)
1982–1990	West Germany	17	(0)
Medal record
Borussia Mönchengladbach
Runner-up	DFB-Pokal	1984
Borussia Dortmund
Winner	DFB-Pokal	1989
Winner	DFB-Supercup	1989
Runner-up	UEFA Cup	1993
West Germany
Third place	Olympics	1988
Winner	FIFA World Cup	1990
- * Club domestic league appearances and goals

Frank Mill (23 July 1958 – 5 August 2025) was a German professional footballer who was a member of the 1990 FIFA World Cup winning squad of West Germany. Further, he participated at the 1984 and at the 1988 Summer Olympics, where he won the bronze medal with the West German team.

== Club career ==
The son of a junk dealer, Mill began his career at the age of six at local side Eintracht Essen before joining the youth ranks of Essen's biggest club, Rot-Weiss Essen, in 1972. Starting job training to become a florist (his mother owned a flower shop), Mill signed his first professional contract with Rot-Weiss in 1976. Essen was a Bundesliga side in his debut season, a campaign in which his three goals (in a total of 19 appearances) couldn't prevent the team from dropping down to 2. Bundesliga North. In that division he grew to become a reliable hitman, scoring 71 goals for Rot-Weiss (at times alongside Horst Hrubesch) over the next four seasons, forty of those in just 38 appearances during 1979–80. This tally made him the top goalscorer of 2. Bundesliga Nord, making him a prime target for a transfer, and in 1981 he was to return to the Bundesliga upon being signed by Jupp Heynckes of Borussia Mönchengladbach.

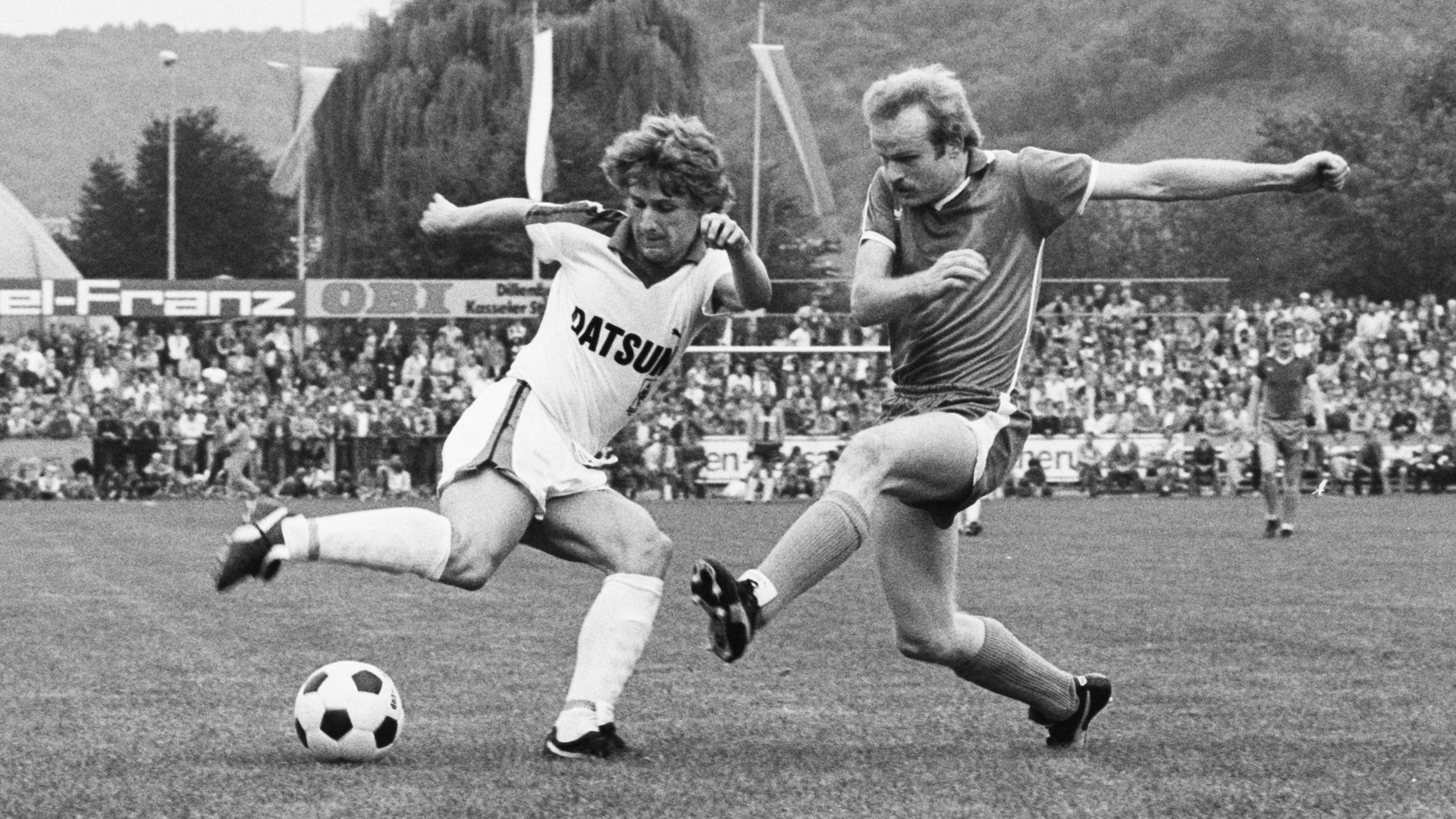
Mill (left) as Borussia Mönchengladbach player (1981)

At Mönchengladbach he kept on scoring, netting fourteen goals in his first year under contract. A back injury hampered his form during the following season, but he bounced back in the 1983–84 campaign, becoming Mönchengladbach's top scorer with 19 goals. That season ended in disappointment, as the club narrowly missed out on the Bundesliga title on goal difference to VfB Stuttgart and lost the DFB-Pokal final to Bayern Munich on penalties, despite Mill scoring in normal time of the final.

Later that summer, Mill took part in the 1984 Summer Olympics. He remained Mönchengladbach’s leading forward until he moved to Borussia Dortmund in 1986 for a fee of 1.3 million DM. The transfer was initially uncertain as Dortmund had to survive relegation play-offs before finalising the deal. Mill had an instant impact, scoring 17 goals in the 1986–87 season to lead Dortmund to a fourth-place finish and qualification for the UEFA Cup. Despite an infamous open-goal miss against Bayern Munich on the opening day, his performances and leadership quickly made him a fan favourite, and he was named club captain.

Though his goal-scoring gradually declined, Mill remained influential, helping Dortmund win the 1989 DFB-Pokal, defeating Werder Bremen in the final. As age began to affect his sharpness, his role in the team began to diminish, especially under new manager Ottmar Hitzfeld, who preferred forwards such as Stéphane Chapuisat and Flemming Povlsen. In 1991–92, Dortmund once again narrowly missed out on the Bundesliga title on goal difference to VfB Stuttgart, and later lost the UEFA Cup final to Juventus.

Mill left Dortmund in 1994 to join newly promoted Fortuna Düsseldorf in the 2. Bundesliga. He scored five goals in his first season, helping them gain promotion to the Bundesliga. His final season, 1995–96, saw him net two goals in the opening three games, but he failed to score in his remaining 26 appearances. He retired with a Bundesliga record of 123 goals in 387 appearances for Borussia Mönchengladbach, Borussia Dortmund and Fortuna Düsseldorf.

Shortly after retirement, Fortuna Düsseldorf appointed Mill to a management position, which he left by mutual consent due to lack of success.

== International career ==
Mill made his debut for West Germany on 21 March 1982 in a friendly against Brazil in Rio de Janeiro. He was selected for the squad for the 1982 FIFA World Cup but missed out due to a back injury.

Mill represented West Germany at the 1984 Summer Olympics and again at the 1988 Summer Olympics, where he won a bronze medal. He was also selected for the national team at UEFA Euro 1988, hosted in West Germany.

Despite declining form by 1990, his experience earned him a call-up from Franz Beckenbauer to the squad for the 1990 World Cup in Italy. However, with forwards such as Rudi Völler, Jürgen Klinsmann and Karlheinz Riedle ahead of him in the pecking order, Mill did not make an appearance during the tournament, as West Germany went on to win the title.

== Death ==
In May 2025, Mill was hospitalised after suffering a heart attack during a taxi ride in Milan. He died on 5 August 2025, at the age of 67.

== Honours ==
Borussia Mönchengladbach

- DFB-Pokal runner-up: 1983–84

Borussia Dortmund

- DFB-Pokal: 1988–89
- UEFA Cup runner-up: 1992–93

West Germany

- World Cup: 1990
- Olympics bronze medal: 1988
