= Peter Quallo =

German footballer

Personal information
- Date of birth: 2 October 1971 (age 55)
- Height: 1.83 m (6 ft 0 in)
- Position: Defender

Senior career*
Years	Team	Apps	(Gls)
1990–1992	Borussia Dortmund	22	(0)
1992–1993	Fortuna Düsseldorf	15	(0)
1993–1997	Arminia Bielefeld	20	(0)
1997–2002	Rot-Weiß Oberhausen	20	(0)
2002–2004	Wilhelmshaven		
2004–2005	Oldenburg		

International career
1990	Germany U21	2	(0)
- * Club domestic league appearances and goals

Peter Quallo (born 2 October 1971) is a German former professional footballer who played as a defender.
