= Tim Gutberlet =

German footballer

Personal information
- Date of birth: 23 August 1971 (age 55)
- Place of birth: West Germany
- Height: 1.81 m (5 ft 11 in)

Youth career
- –1988: TSC Eintracht Dortmund
- 1988–1990: Borussia Dortmund

Senior career*
Years	Team	Apps	(Gls)
1990–1993	Borussia Dortmund	0	(0)
1993–1994	Arminia Bielefeld	28	(8)
1994–1995	Darmstadt 98	31	(11)
1995–1996	Tennis Borussia Berlin	21	(2)
1996–1998	FC Bayern München (A)	50	(12)
1998–1999	FC St. Pauli	3	(0)
1999–2000	Darmstadt 98	29	(3)
2000–2001	FC St. Pauli		
Total		162	(36)
- * Club domestic league appearances and goals

Tim Gutberlet (born 23 August 1971) is a German former professional footballer who played as a midfielder. He made three appearances in the 2. Bundesliga for FC St. Pauli during his playing career.
