= Thomas Helmer =

German footballer

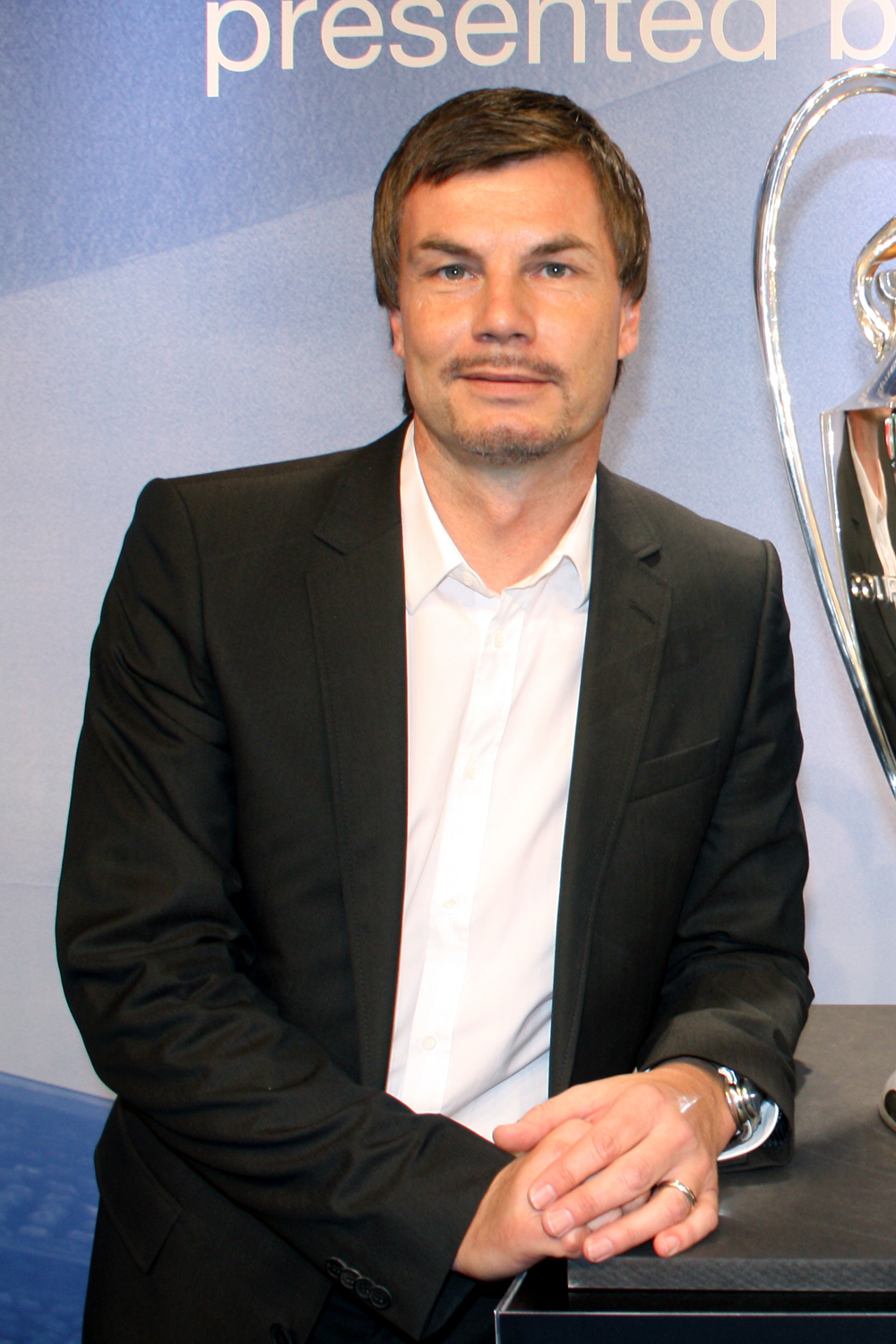
- Helmer in 2010

Personal information
- Date of birth: 21 April 1965 (age 61)
- Place of birth: Herford, West Germany
- Height: 1.85 m (6 ft 1 in)
- Positions: Centre-back; sweeper

Youth career
- –1984: SC Bad Salzuflen

Senior career*
Years	Team	Apps	(Gls)
1984–1986	Arminia Bielefeld	39	(5)
1986–1992	Borussia Dortmund	190	(16)
1992–1999	Bayern Munich	191	(24)
1999–2000	Sunderland	2	(0)
1999	→ Hertha BSC (loan)	5	(1)
Total		427	(46)

International career
1990–1998	Germany	68	(5)
Medal record
Men's football
Representing Germany
UEFA European Championship
Winner	1996 England
Runner-up	1992 Sweden
- * Club domestic league appearances and goals

Thomas Helmer (born 21 April 1965) is a German former professional footballer. His preferred playing position was sweeper, but he was primarily deployed as a centre-back.

Helmer spent most of his club career with Borussia Dortmund and Bayern Munich – appearing in nearly 400 Bundesliga games in 15 seasons – and won the European Championship in 1996.

== Club career ==
Born in Herford, West Germany, Helmer began his professional career with Arminia Bielefeld, playing four games late in 1984–85, in a season that ended in relegation. In the following season, he netted five goals in 35 second division matches, prompting interest from Borussia Dortmund, which signed him in 1986. A key element from the start, Helmer also scored 16 goals during his six-season stint.

In 1992, he joined Bayern Munich in controversial circumstances. Dortmund did not wish to sell Helmer, one of its best players, to a rival Bundesliga team, and sent him to France's Lyon instead. However, only three months later, Lyon sold Helmer to Bayern Munich for 7.5 million marks, at the time a record transfer fee paid by the Bavarian club. The resulting furore became so heated that the Germany national side coach Berti Vogts threatened to drop Helmer from the UEFA Euro 92 squad because of the distraction the affair was causing.

Helmer was also an integral part (scoring seven goals in his debut season) and, eventually, captain of an ascendant Bayern Munich team of the late-1990s, winning three league titles, one cup and three League cups), adding the 1995–96 UEFA Cup, where he scored once (against Bordeaux in the final's first leg) in 12 games. Defensively, the team would also include, during Helmer's stay, internationals Olaf Thon, Lothar Matthäus and Markus Babbel.

Upon leaving Bayern in 1999, Helmer opted to move to the Premier League. He was offered a contract by Liverpool, but chose instead to join newly promoted Sunderland on a free transfer. Sunderland manager Peter Reid hardly used him, however, making just two league appearances against Leeds United and Arsenal and he returned to Germany on loan with Hertha BSC. Although he had appeared in the UEFA Champions League for Hertha, upon his return to Sunderland, Reid judged that "his legs had gone", and the club bought-out his contract, with the player retiring immediately afterwards.

== International career ==
Helmer made his full international debut for Germany on 10 October 1990, a 3–1 win in a friendly match with Sweden in Stockholm. He enjoyed great success in the UEFA European Football Championships, starting in consecutive finals. In 1992, Germany lost surprisingly to Denmark, which had been called at the last hour, but four years later went one better, defeating the Czech Republic in extra-time at Wembley.

Helmer also appeared in two FIFA World Cups, bowing out of international football in the second round clash of the 1998 edition against Mexico, when he was replaced before half-time by Christian Ziege. He was known for tripping Josip Weber during the 1994 world cup in the penalty area but Kurt Röthlisberger, the referee, did not make a call.

== Post-retirement ==
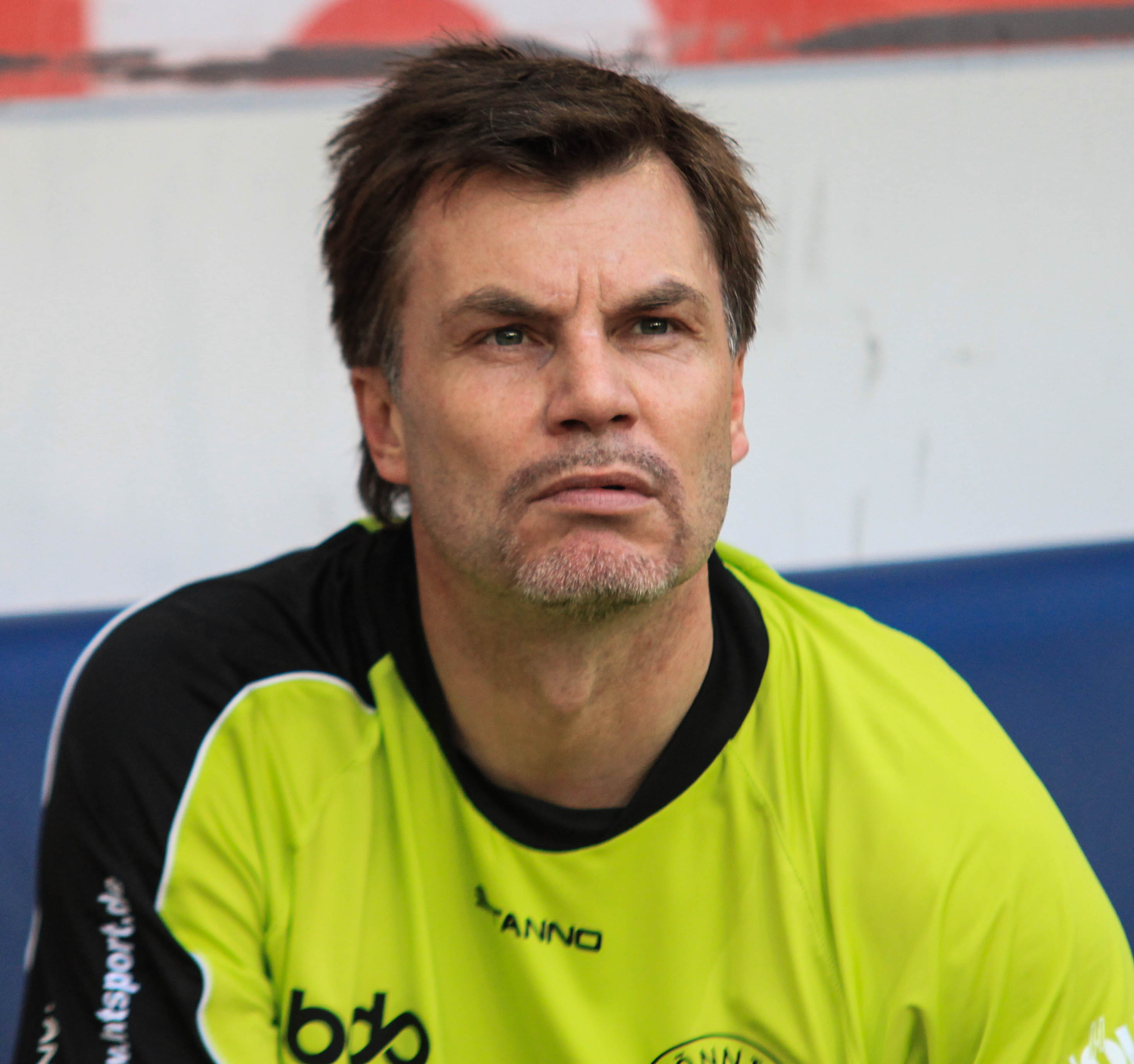
Helmer during a charity match in 2012

After retiring, Helmer worked as a sports journalist and television presenter with DSF. Additionally, he served as Germany's ambassador to children's charity "FIFA for SOS Children's Villages", first undertaking it in 1997.

Helmer was a member of the Supervisory board of Arminia Bielefeld from 19 July 2011 to 15 December 2015.

== Career statistics ==
Scores and results table. Germany's goal tally first.

#	Date	Venue	Opponent	Score	Result	Competition
1.	21 June 1995	Letzigrund, Zürich	Italy	1–0	2–0	Friendly
2.	8 October 1995	Ulrich-Haberland-Stadion, Leverkusen	Moldova	2–0	6–1	Euro 1996 qualifier
3.	11 October 1997	AWD-Arena, Hanover	Albania	1–1	4–3	1998 World Cup qualifier
4.	22 February 1998	King Fahd International Stadium, Riyadh	Saudi Arabia	2–0	3–0	Friendly
5.	5 June 1998	Carl-Benz-Stadion, Mannheim	Luxembourg	3–0	7–0	Friendly

== Honours ==
Borussia Dortmund

- DFB-Pokal: 1988–89
- DFB-Supercup: 1989

Bayern Munich

- Bundesliga: 1993–94, 1996–97, 1998–99
- DFB-Pokal: 1997–98; runner-up 1998–99
- DFB-Ligapokal: 1997, 1998
- UEFA Cup: 1995–96
- UEFA Champions League: runner-up 1998–99

Germany

- UEFA European Championship: 1996; runner-up 1992
- US Cup: 1993
