= Gerhard Poschner =

German footballer (born 1969)

Personal information
- Full name: Gerhard Hans Poschner
- Date of birth: 23 September 1969 (age 57)
- Place of birth: Dumitra, Romania
- Height: 1.82 m (6 ft 0 in)
- Position: Defensive midfielder

Youth career
- 1974–1984: SpVgg Bissingen
- 1984–1987: VfB Stuttgart

Senior career*
Years	Team	Apps	(Gls)
1987–1990	VfB Stuttgart	46	(0)
1990–1994	Borussia Dortmund	110	(14)
1994–1998	VfB Stuttgart	130	(8)
1999	Venezia	1	(0)
1999–2001	Rayo Vallecano	56	(1)
2001	Rapid Vienna	6	(0)
2002–2003	Poli Ejido	52	(6)
2004	1860 Munich	4	(0)
Total		405	(29)

International career
1989–1990	Germany U21	18	(4)
1990–1992	Germany U23	3	(1)
- * Club domestic league appearances and goals

Gerhard Hans Poschner (born 23 September 1969) is a German former professional footballer who played as a defensive midfielder.

He appeared in 286 games in the Bundesliga over 12 seasons, scoring 22 goals for VfB Stuttgart and Borussia Dortmund. He also played in Italy, Spain and Austria.

== Club career ==
Poschner was born in Dumitra, Romania. At the age of five, his family fled the country to escape the communist regime and moved abroad to Bietigheim-Bissingen, West Germany. He began his professional career in 1987–88 with VfB Stuttgart, where he played three seasons with little impact in the first team (an average of 15 Bundesliga appearances).

Poschner emerged as a top-flight player with Borussia Dortmund, scoring 14 league goals from 1990 to 1994 and losing, for the second time, the UEFA Cup. He returned to Stuttgart for four and a half additional campaigns, helping the side win the 1997 edition of the DFB-Pokal and moving to S.S.C. Venezia from Italy in January 1999; additionally, whilst with the former club, in the 1998 UEFA Cup Winners' Cup Final against Chelsea, he was sent off for dissent late on to put both teams down to ten men, with Dan Petrescu having been ejected beforehand in a 0–1 loss in Stockholm.

Subsequently, Poschner played with Rayo Vallecano, SK Rapid Wien, Polideportivo Ejido and TSV 1860 München, before retiring at the age of almost 35. In 1999–2000 he helped Madrid's Rayo to a best-ever classification in La Liga (ninth), and they were eventually awarded a place in European competition via the Fair Play award, eventually reaching the quarter-finals with the midfielder being an important element.

Poschner was named Real Zaragoza's general manager in August 2009. He left the post at the end of the season, and went to work in the same capacity with 1860 Munich.

== Honours ==
VfB Stuttgart

- DFB-Pokal: 1996–97
- UEFA Cup runner-up: 1988–89
- UEFA Cup Winners' Cup runner-up: 1997–98
- DFB-Ligapokal runner-up: 1997

Borussia Dortmund

- UEFA Cup runner-up: 1992–93
