= Bodo Schmidt =

German footballer and coach

Personal information
- Date of birth: September 3, 1967 (age 59)
- Place of birth: Niebüll, West Germany
- Height: 1.87 m (6 ft 2 in)
- Position: Defender

Team information
- Current team: SV Frisia 03 (Manager)

Youth career
- –1985: Rot-Weiß Niebüll
- 1985–1986: TSB Flensburg
- 1986–1987: Rot-Weiß Niebüll

Senior career*
Years	Team	Apps	(Gls)
1987–1989	Bayern Munich (A)		
1989–1991	SpVgg Unterhaching		
1991–1996	Borussia Dortmund	116	(2)
1996–1998	1. FC Köln	64	(1)
1998	SCB Preußen Köln		
1998–2002	1. FC Magdeburg	104	(10)
2002–2005	SpVgg Flensburg 08		

Managerial career
- 2005–2007: SpVgg Flensburg 08
- 2007–: SV Frisia 03
- * Club domestic league appearances and goals

Bodo Schmidt (born September 3, 1967 in Niebüll) is a German football coach and a former player who manages SV Frisia 03 Risum-Lindholm.

== Honours ==
- UEFA Cup finalist: 1993
- Bundesliga: 1995, 1996; runner-up 1992
- DFL-Supercup: 1995
