= Jürgen Wegmann =

German footballer

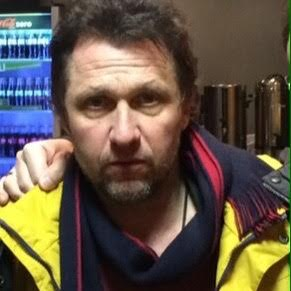
- Jürgen Wegmann in 2015

Personal information
- Date of birth: 31 March 1964 (age 62)
- Place of birth: Essen, West Germany
- Height: 1.72 m (5 ft 8 in)
- Position: Striker

Senior career*
Years	Team	Apps	(Gls)
1981–1983	Rot-Weiss Essen	65	(32)
1984–1986	Borussia Dortmund	70	(25)
1986–1987	Schalke 04	28	(10)
1987–1989	Bayern Munich	58	(26)
1989–1992	Borussia Dortmund	47	(8)
1993	MSV Duisburg	7	(2)
1993–1994	Rot-Weiss Essen	5	(0)
Total		280	(103)

International career
1984–1985	West Germany U-21	4	(0)
- * Club domestic league appearances and goals

Jürgen 'Kobra' Wegmann (born 31 March 1964) is a German former professional football who played as a striker.

== Honours ==
=== Club ===
Bayern Munich

- DFL-Supercup: 1987
- Bundesliga: 1988–89

Borussia Dortmund

- DFL-Supercup: 1989
- UEFA Cup: runner-up 1992–93

Rot-Weiss Essen

- DFB-Pokal finalist: 1994

=== Individual ===
- Goal of the Year (Germany): 1988
