= Günter Breitzke =

German footballer

Personal information
- Date of birth: 29 June 1967 (age 59)
- Height: 1.83 m (6 ft 0 in)
- Position: Midfielder

Senior career*
| Years | Team | Apps | (Gls) |
| 1988–1992 | Borussia Dortmund | | |
| 1992–1993 | Fortuna Düsseldorf | | |
| 1993–1994 | Wuppertal | | |
| 1994–1995 | Homburg | | |
| 1995–1997 | Wuppertal | | |
| 1997–1998 | Alemannia Aachen | | |
| 1998–1999 | Sportfreunde Eisbachtal | | |
- * Club domestic league appearances and goals

Günter Breitzke (born 29 June 1967) is a retired German football midfielder.

== Honours ==
Borussia Dortmund

- DFL-Supercup: 1989
