= Uwe Grauer =

German footballer

Personal information
- Date of birth: 1 January 1970 (age 56)
- Place of birth: Dortmund, West Germany
- Height: 1.88 m (6 ft 2 in)
- Position: Defender

Team information
- Current team: 1. FC Köln II (assistant)

Youth career
- BW Büderich
- Hammer SpVg

Senior career*
Years	Team	Apps	(Gls)
1990–1994	Borussia Dortmund	20	(1)
1994–1999	Bayer Uerdingen/KFC Uerdingen	115	(4)
1999–2001	SSV Ulm	36	(0)
2001–2004	SG Wattenscheid 09	89	(3)
2004–2005	Schalke 04 II		
2005–2007	SV Westfalia Rhynern		

Managerial career
- 2007–2008: SV Westfalia Rhynern
- 2008–2009: Schalke 04 U12
- 2009–2014: Schalke 04 U19 (assistant)
- 2014–2015: Schalke 04 U17
- 2015–: 1. FC Köln II (assistant)
- * Club domestic league appearances and goals

Uwe Grauer (born 1 January 1970 in Dortmund) is a German football coach and a former player. He is currently working as assistant manager for 1. FC Köln II.

== Honours ==
Borussia Dortmund

- UEFA Cup finalist: 1992–93
