= Michael Lusch =

German footballer and coach

Personal information
- Date of birth: 16 June 1964 (age 62)
- Place of birth: Hamm, West Germany
- Height: 1.73 m (5 ft 8 in)
- Positions: Midfielder; striker

Youth career
- Germania Hamm

Senior career*
Years	Team	Apps	(Gls)
1982–1993	Borussia Dortmund	203	(10)
1993–1995	1. FC Kaiserslautern	44	(0)
1995–1996	KFC Uerdingen 05	20	(0)
1996–1998	Schwarz-Weiß Essen		
1998–2000	Rot-Weiss Essen		

International career
1984	Germany U-21	1	(0)

Managerial career
- 2003–2004: Rot-Weiss Essen (assistant)
- 2004–2005: Rot-Weiss Essen (scout)
- 2005–2006: Rot-Weiß Oberhausen (assistant)
- * Club domestic league appearances and goals

Michael Lusch (born 16 June 1964) is a German football coach and a retired player.

== Honours ==
Borussia Dortmund

- UEFA Cup finalist: 1992–93
- DFB-Pokal: 1988–89
