= Michael Rummenigge =

German footballer (born 1964)

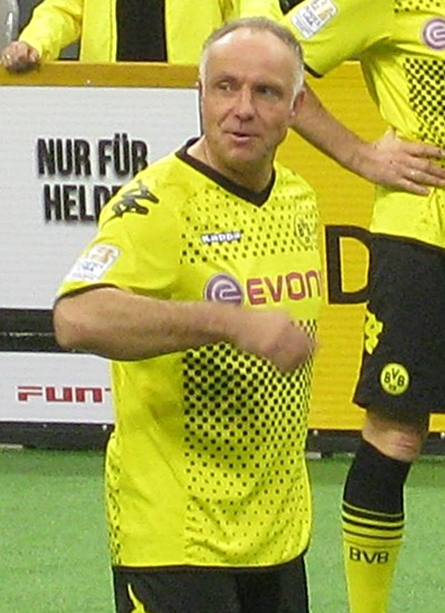
- Rummenigge playing for a Borussia Dortmund veterans team in 2011

Personal information
- Date of birth: 3 February 1964 (age 62)
- Place of birth: Lippstadt, West Germany
- Height: 1.74 m (5 ft 9 in)
- Positions: Midfielder; striker

Youth career
- 1970–1981: Borussia Lippstadt
- 1981–1982: Bayern Munich

Senior career*
Years	Team	Apps	(Gls)
1982–1988	Bayern Munich	152	(44)
1988–1993	Borussia Dortmund	157	(36)
1993–1995	Urawa Reds	42	(13)
Total		351	(93)

International career
1980–1982	West Germany U-18	9	(1)
1983–1985	West Germany U-21	10	(4)
1983–1986	West Germany	2	(0)
Medal record
Bayern Munich
Winner	DFB-Pokal	1984
Winner	Bundesliga	1985
Runner-up	DFB-Pokal	1985
Winner	Bundesliga	1986
Winner	DFB-Pokal	1986
Winner	Bundesliga	1987
Runner-up	European Cup	1987
Winner	DFB-Supercup	1987
Borussia Dortmund
Winner	DFB-Pokal	1989
Winner	DFB-Supercup	1989
Runner-up	UEFA Cup	1993
- * Club domestic league appearances and goals

Michael Rummenigge (born 3 February 1964) is a German former professional footballer who played as a forward.

== Career ==
Rummenigge was born in Lippstadt, North Rhine-Westphalia. At the beginning of his career, he did not have it easy as a player with the Bayern Munich star team. He was often compared to his older brother, Karl-Heinz Rummenigge, captain of FC Bayern Munich and the Germany national team. Rummenigge joined Bayern Munich in 1981 as a member of the German junior national team at the age of 17, coming from Borussia Lippstadt. His brother, Karl-Heinz, was already an international top star player. Rummenigge became a professional player in Munich in 1982 and a starter in his second season in 1983. He played for Bayern Munich till 1988. By that time his team had won the German championship three times and the DFB-Pokal two times (in 1984 and 1986).

During his career, Rummenigge was capped twice for the Germany national team and represented Germany on two occasions in 1983 and 1986.

In 1988, he changed team affiliation to Borussia Dortmund. In spite of not being very popular with Borussia's supporters in the beginning, he won the DFB-Pokal with Dortmund by the end of his first season – the first title for Borussia Dortmund since the 1960s. Borussia Dortmund defeated Werder Bremen 4–1 in Berlin.

In 1991–92, after the arrival of the new BVB coach, Ottmar Hitzfeld, he was appointed captain of the team. In the same year, Borussia Dortmund became the runner-up in the German championship. In 1993, he played in the UEFA Cup final for Borussia Dortmund against Juventus. Dortmund lost 6–1 on aggregate with Rummenigge scoring their only goal.

Rummenigge finished his career in the black and yellow football shirt of Dortmund in 1993. After having played 309 times in the Bundesliga and having scored 80 goals, he moved on to Japan where a professional football league had just been launched. He played for Urawa Red Diamonds, Japan till 1995. At the beginning of 1996 he had to give up his career because of a severe toe injury.

== Business ==
Rummenigge is a trained banker and runs a successful sports marketing agency in Dortmund (Sports & Business) as well as commercial football camps (Fußballschule Michael Rummenigge). In addition he is a partner/shareholder of the Sportnex GmbH in Munich.

He is also a partner of "Germany's best indoor soccer courts" in Münster and launched (together with a different partner) another new business, "Trendsport Rummenigge", which distributes mobile soccer courts, cages and playing fields.

Rummenigge works as patron for the initiative "NO DRUGS" – an initiative against drug abuse and also for the association Childrensmile e. V. which supports severely ill and disadvantaged children.

In June 2007, he passed his exam to be a professional football coach with distinction (UEFA Pro licence) at the German sport university in Cologne.

== Personal life ==
Rummenigge is married to Carolin and has three sons.

== Career statistics ==
=== Club ===
Club	Season	League			Cup		League Cup		Total	
Club	Season	Division	Apps	Goals	Apps	Goals	Apps	Goals	Apps	Goals
Bayern Munich	1982–83	Bundesliga	1	0					1	0
Bayern Munich	1983–84	Bundesliga	33	11					33	11
Bayern Munich	1984–85	Bundesliga	24	5					24	5
Bayern Munich	1985–86	Bundesliga	31	10					31	10
Bayern Munich	1986–87	Bundesliga	31	8					31	8
Bayern Munich	1987–88	Bundesliga	32	10					32	10
Bayern Munich	Total		152	44					152	44
Borussia Dortmund	1988–89	Bundesliga	32	4					32	4
Borussia Dortmund	1989–90	Bundesliga	29	9					29	9
Borussia Dortmund	1990–91	Bundesliga	31	8					31	8
Borussia Dortmund	1991–92	Bundesliga	36	10					36	10
Borussia Dortmund	1992–93	Bundesliga	26	4					26	4
Borussia Dortmund	1993–94	Bundesliga	3	1					3	1
Borussia Dortmund	Total		157	36					157	36
Urawa Reds	1993	J1 League	6	1	2	0	3	3	11	4
Urawa Reds	1994	J1 League	27	11	0	0	2	1	29	12
Urawa Reds	1995	J1 League	9	1	0	0	-		9	1
Urawa Reds	Total		42	13	2	0	5	4	49	17
Career total			351	93	2	0	5	4	358	97

=== International ===
Germany national team
Year	Apps	Goals
1983	1	0
1984	0	0
1985	0	0
1986	1	0
Total	2	0

== Honours ==
Bayern Munich

- Bundesliga: 1984–85, 1985–86, 1986–87
- DFB-Pokal: 1983–84, 1985–86
- DFL-Supercup: 1987
- European Cup: runner-up 1986–87

Borussia Dortmund

- DFB-Pokal: 1988–89
- DFL-Supercup: 1989
- UEFA Cup: runner-up 1992–93
