= 1988–89 DFB-Pokal =

Tournament details
- Country: West Germany
- Teams: 64

Final positions
- Champions: Borussia Dortmund
- Runners-up: Werder Bremen

Tournament statistics
- Matches played: 72
- Top goal scorer(s): Christian Schreier (7 goals)

The 1988–89 DFB-Pokal was the 46th season of the annual German football cup competition. It began on 6 August 1988 and ended on 24 June 1989. 64 teams competed in the tournament of six rounds. In the final Borussia Dortmund defeated Werder Bremen 4–1.

== Matches ==
=== First round ===
6 August 1988
1. FC Kaiserslautern	2 – 1	FC St. Pauli
SV Werder Bremen	4 – 1	Hannover 96
Karlsruher SC	2 – 1	Stuttgarter Kickers
Borussia Dortmund	6 – 0	Eintracht Braunschweig
1. FC Köln	6 – 1	SV Darmstadt 98
FC Bayern Munich	11 – 2	Blau-Weiß 90 Berlin
FC Schalke 04	1 – 1	Borussia Mönchengladbach	(AET)
SV Meppen	1 – 2	Bayer 05 Uerdingen
SSV Ulm 1846	1 – 4	1. FC Nürnberg
VfL Wolfsburg	1 – 1	Eintracht Frankfurt	(AET)
SGK Heidelberg	1 – 3	SV Waldhof Mannheim
Arminia Bielefeld	0 – 0	VfL Bochum	(AET)
SV Ottfingen	0 – 5	VfB Stuttgart
BSC Erlangen	0 – 5	Bayer 04 Leverkusen
MSV Duisburg	3 – 5	Hamburger SV	(AET)
SG Wattenscheid 09	1 – 1	VfL Osnabrück	(AET)
SC Fortuna Köln	1 – 0	Fortuna Düsseldorf
TSV Verden	1 – 2	Rot-Weiß Essen
FC Augsburg	1 – 4	Alemannia Aachen
FC Germania Dörnigheim	0 – 5	SpVgg Bayreuth
SG Düren 99	1 – 3	Kickers Offenbach
TBV Lemgo	0 – 4	FC 08 Homburg
FSV Salmrohr	2 – 0	SC Freiburg
STV Horst-Emscher	0 – 0	SG Union Solingen	(AET)
VfR Wormatia Worms	1 – 3	1. FC Saarbrücken
VfL Kirchheim unter Teck	1 – 2	SV Wehen
TuS Hoisdorf 1958	3 – 0	Rot-Weiß Oberhausen
SSV Reutlingen	2 – 1	SF Hamborn 07
BFC Türkiyemspor 1978	0 – 2	FC Emmendingen
Meiendorfer SV 1949	0 – 1	TSV Ostholz-Tenever
BVL 08 Remscheid	2 – 3	SpVgg Landshut
FC Bitburg	1 – 2	SV Saar 05 Saarbrücken

==== Replays ====
17 August 1988
Borussia Mönchengladbach	1 – 2	FC Schalke 04
VfL Osnabrück	2 – 1	SG Wattenscheid 09
SG Union Solingen	5 – 1	STV Horst-Emscher
25 September 1988
Eintracht Frankfurt	6 – 1	VfL Wolfsburg
VfL Bochum	4 – 1	Arminia Bielefeld	(AET)

=== Second round ===
24 September 1988
VfL Osnabrück	0 – 1	Hamburger SV
SV Werder Bremen	6 – 1	SpVgg Bayreuth
TuS Hoisdorf	0 – 4	FC Bayern Munich
SG Union Solingen	2 – 2	SC Fortuna Köln	(AET)
SSV Reutlingen	1 – 1	Rot-Weiß Essen	(AET)
SpVgg Landshut	1 – 2	Alemannia Aachen
FSV Salmrohr	0 – 1	1. FC Saarbrücken	(AET)
SV Emmendingen	1 – 3	SV Wehen
12 October 1988
Bayer 05 Uerdingen	5 – 4	Eintracht Frankfurt	(AET)
30 October 1988
TSV Osterholz-Tenever	0 – 6	Bayer 04 Leverkusen
1 November 1988
1. FC Köln	1 – 2	SV Waldhof Mannheim
1. FC Nürnberg	1 – 1	Karlsruher SC	(AET)
Borussia Dortmund	2 – 1	FC 08 Homburg
Saar 05 Saarbrücken	3 – 3	FC Schalke 04	(AET)
2 November 1988
1. FC Kaiserslautern	5 – 0	Kickers Offenbach
29 November 1988
VfB Stuttgart	3 – 2	VfL Bochum	(AET)

==== Replays ====
12 October 1988
Rot-Weiß Essen	3 – 1	SSV Reutlingen
16 October 1988
SC Fortuna Köln	5 – 2	SG Union Solingen
29 November 1988
Karlsruher SC	1 – 0	1. FC Nürnberg
FC Schalke 04	7 – 1	Saar 05 Saarbrücken

=== Round of 16 ===
16 November 1988
Hamburger SV	3 – 1	Rot-Weiß Essen
10 December 1988
FC Schalke 04	2 – 3	Borussia Dortmund
Bayer 04 Leverkusen	5 – 2	SV Waldhof Mannheim
SV Wehen	2 – 3	1. FC Kaiserslautern
FC Bayern Munich	3 – 4	Karlsruher SC
Alemannia Aachen	1 – 4	Bayer 05 Uerdingen
SV Werder Bremen	3 – 1	SC Fortuna Köln	(AET)
VfB Stuttgart	2 – 0	1. FC Saarbrücken	(AET)

=== Quarter-finals ===
29 March 1989
Borussia Dortmund	1 – 0	Karlsruher SC
Bayer 04 Leverkusen	2 – 0	Bayer 05 Uerdingen
VfB Stuttgart	4 – 0	1. FC Kaiserslautern
Hamburger SV	0 – 1	SV Werder Bremen	(AET)

=== Semi-finals ===
9 May 1989
Borussia Dortmund	2 – 0	VfB Stuttgart
Bayer 04 Leverkusen	1 – 2	SV Werder Bremen

== Final ==
24 June 1989
18:00 CEST

Borussia Dortmund	4–1	Werder Bremen
Dickel 21', 73'; Mill 58'; Lusch 74'	Report	Riedle 15'

Olympiastadion, West Berlin
Attendance: 76,500
Referee: Karl-Heinz Tritschler (Freiburg)
