= 1991–92 Karlsruher SC season =

Karlsruher SC
1991–92 season
- Manager: Winfried Schäfer
- Stadium: Wildparkstadion
- Bundesliga: 8th
- DFB-Pokal: Quarter-finals
- Top goalscorer: League: Rainer Schütterle (10); All: Rainer Schütterle (11)

The 1991–92 Karlsruher SC season was the 97th season in the club's history and the 5th consecutive season playing in the Bundesliga since promotion from 2. Bundesliga in 1987. Karlsruher SC finished eight in the league.

The club also participated in the DFB-Pokal where it reached the quarter-finals, losing against Hannover 96.

== Competitions ==
=== Overview ===
Competition	First match	Last match	Starting round	Final position	Record							
Competition	First match	Last match	Starting round	Final position	Pld	W	D	L	GF	GA	GD	Win %
Bundesliga	3 August 1991	16 May 1992	Matchday 1	8th	38	16	9	13	48	50	−2	42.11
DFB-Pokal	18 August 1991	30 October 1991	Second round	Quarter-finals	4	3	0	1	4	1	+3	75.00
Total					42	19	9	14	52	51	+1	45.24

Source: Competitions

=== Bundesliga ===
3 August 1991 1	Karlsruher SC	2–2	Borussia Dortmund	Karlsruhe
15:30	Hermann 3'; Scholl 77'	Report	Chapuisat 23'; Breitzke 82'	Stadium: Wildparkstadion; Attendance: 21,000; Referee: Manfred Harder

10 August 1991 2	VfB Stuttgart	1–0	Karlsruher SC	Stuttgart
15:30	Walter 58'	Report		Stadium: Neckarstadion; Attendance: 30,000; Referee: Günther Habermann

13 August 1991 3	Karlsruher SC	2–0	Borussia Mönchengladbach	Karlsruhe
20:00	Schmidt 12'; Rolff 35'	Report		Stadium: Wildparkstadion; Attendance: 27,000; Referee: Gerhard Theobald

21 August 1991 4	SG Wattenscheid 09	1–1	Karlsruher SC	Bochum-Wattenscheid
18:30	Schupp 47' (pen.)	Report	Schütterle 31'	Stadium: Lohrheidestadion; Attendance: 4,000; Referee: Lutz Michael Fröhlich

24 August 1991 5	Karlsruher SC	0–0	Bayer Leverkusen	Karlsruhe
15:30		Report		Stadium: Wildparkstadion; Attendance: 16,000; Referee: Hans-Peter Dellwing

27 August 1991 6	MSV Duisburg	6–2	Karlsruher SC	Duisburg
19:30	Tönnies 11', 12', 16', 37', 68'; Lienen 29'	Report	Gielchen 30' (o.g.); Schütterle 65'	Stadium: Wedaustadion; Attendance: 15,000; Referee: Hartmut Strampe

31 August 1991 7	Stuttgarter Kickers	1–1	Karlsruher SC	Stuttgart
15:30	Moutas 39'	Report	Schütterle 21'	Stadium: Neckarstadion; Attendance: 13,000; Referee: Michael Prengel

7 September 1991 8	Karlsruher SC	2–1	Werder Bremen	Karlsruhe
15:30	Schmidt 45'; Schütterle 57'	Report	Rufer 45'	Stadium: Wildparkstadion; Attendance: 15,000; Referee: Jürgen Aust

13 September 1991 9	Hansa Rostock	1–2	Karlsruher SC	Rostock
20:00	Schlünz 85'	Report	Rolff 49'; Wittwer 89'	Stadium: Ostseestadion; Attendance: 10,000; Referee: Hellmut Krug

20 September 1991 10	Karlsruher SC	1–5	Fortuna Düsseldorf	Karlsruhe
20:00	Shmarov 14'	Report	Allofs 17', 38'; Demandt 63'; Schreier 82'; Hey 83'	Stadium: Wildparkstadion; Attendance: 18,000; Referee: Hans-Jürgen Kasper

28 September 1991 11	Schalke 04	3–1	Karlsruher SC	Gelsenkirchen
15:30	Schlipper 49'; Luginger 68'; Borodyuk 82'	Report	Hermann 34'	Stadium: Parkstadion; Attendance: 31,300; Referee: Alfons Berg

4 October 1991 12	Karlsruher SC	1–0	Dynamo Dresden	Karlsruhe
20:00	Schütterle 57'	Report		Stadium: Wildparkstadion; Attendance: 14,000; Referee: Wolfgang Mierswa

11 October 1991 13	VfL Bochum	1–3	Karlsruher SC	Bochum
20:00	Milde 73'	Report	Reichert 35'; Schütterle 45', 89'	Stadium: Ruhrstadion; Attendance: 11,100; Referee: Karl-Josef Assenmacher

19 October 1991 14	Karlsruher SC	0–1	1. FC Köln	Karlsruhe
15:30		Report	Littbarski 85'	Stadium: Wildparkstadion; Attendance: 17,000; Referee: Edgar Steinborn

26 October 1991 15	1. FC Kaiserslautern	3–0	Karlsruher SC	Kaiserslautern
15:30	Funkel 33' (pen.); Witeczek 45'; Hotić 63'	Report		Stadium: Fritz-Walter-Stadion; Attendance: 36,149; Referee: Hans-Jürgen Weber

2 November 1991 16	Karlsruher SC	4–1	Hamburger SV	Karlsruhe
15:30	Schütterle 2', 4'; Rolff 85'; Scholl 87'	Report	Eck 58'	Stadium: Wildparkstadion; Attendance: 11,000; Referee: Wieland Ziller

9 November 1991 17	Eintracht Frankfurt	1–1	Karlsruher SC	Frankfurt
15:30	Yeboah 84'	Report	Reich 52'	Stadium: Waldstadion; Attendance: 17,000; Referee: Jürgen Aust

16 November 1991 18	Karlsruher SC	1–0	1. FC Nürnberg	Karlsruhe
15:30	Carl 65'	Report		Stadium: Wildparkstadion; Attendance: 17,000; Referee: Hellmut Krug

23 November 1991 19	Bayern Munich	1–0	Karlsruher SC	Munich
15:30	Effenberg 8'	Report		Stadium: Olympiastadion; Attendance: 20,000; Referee: Eugen Strigel

29 November 1991 20	Borussia Dortmund	1–0	Karlsruher SC	Dortmund
20:00	Povlsen 42'	Report		Stadium: Westfalenstadion; Attendance: 35,020; Referee: Klaus-Dieter Stenzel

7 December 1991 21	Karlsruher SC	0–0	VfB Stuttgart	Karlsruhe
20:00		Report		Stadium: Wildparkstadion; Attendance: 18,000; Referee: Manfred Führer

13 December 1991 22	Borussia Mönchengladbach	1–0	Karlsruher SC	Mönchengladbach
20:00	Dahlin 7'	Report		Stadium: Bökelbergstadion; Attendance: 11,981; Referee: Michael Malbranc

7 February 1992 23	Karlsruher SC	1–2	SG Wattenscheid 09	Karlsruhe
20:00	Glesius 78'	Report	Buckmaier 17'; Tschiskale 66'	Stadium: Wildparkstadion; Attendance: 11,000; Referee: Wolf-Günter Wiesel

15 February 1992 24	Bayer Leverkusen	2–0	Karlsruher SC	Leverkusen
15:30	Kirsten 71', 76'	Report		Stadium: Ulrich-Haberland-Stadion; Attendance: 8,300; Referee: Lutz Michael Fröhlich

21 February 1992 25	Karlsruher SC	2–2	MSV Duisburg	Karlsruhe
20:00	Shmarov 42'; Rolff 87'	Report	Struckmann 72'; Bremser 87'	Stadium: Wildparkstadion; Attendance: 9,000; Referee: Markus Merk

29 February 1992 26	Karlsruher SC	3–1	Stuttgarter Kickers	Karlsruhe
15:30	Metz 7' (pen.); Schütterle 26'; Carl 39'	Report	Keim 69'	Stadium: Wildparkstadion; Attendance: 13,000; Referee: Hans-Jürgen Weber

7 March 1992 27	Werder Bremen	0–0	Karlsruher SC	Bremen
15:30		Report		Stadium: Weser-Stadion; Attendance: 12,100; Referee: Wieland Ziller

15 March 1992 28	Karlsruher SC	2–1	Hansa Rostock	Karlsruhe
15:30	Shmarov 32'; Scholl 53'	Report	Spies 17'	Stadium: Wildparkstadion; Attendance: 10,000; Referee: Michael Prengel

21 March 1992 29	Fortuna Düsseldorf	2–3	Karlsruher SC	Düsseldorf
15:30	Rahn 19'; Allofs 72'	Report	Shmarov 16', 83'; Reich 54'	Stadium: Rheinstadion; Attendance: 7,500; Referee: Bernd Heynemann

28 March 1992 30	Karlsruher SC	1–0	Schalke 04	Karlsruhe
15:30	Carl 1'	Report		Stadium: Wildparkstadion; Attendance: 21,000; Referee: Hermann Albrecht

3 April 1992 31	Dynamo Dresden	2–0	Karlsruher SC	Dresden
20:00	Melzig 78'; Zander 90'	Report		Stadium: Rudolf-Harbig-Stadion; Attendance: 12,000; Referee: Hellmut Krug

11 April 1992 32	Karlsruher SC	1–1	VfL Bochum	Karlsruhe
15:30	Carl 12'	Report	Wegmann 23'	Stadium: Wildparkstadion; Attendance: 13,500; Referee: Aron Schmidhuber

18 April 1992 33	1. FC Köln	2–3	Karlsruher SC	Köln
15:30	Giske 47', 55'	Report	Rolff 26'; Krieg 36'; Reich 64'	Stadium: Müngersdorfer Stadion; Attendance: 13,000; Referee: Wolf-Günter Wiesel

25 April 1992 34	Karlsruher SC	2–1	1. FC Kaiserslautern	Karlsruhe
15:30	Funkel 34' (o.g.); Metz 90'	Report	Scherr 73'	Stadium: Wildparkstadion; Attendance: 23,000; Referee: Lothar Löwer

2 May 1992 35	Hamburger SV	0–1	Karlsruher SC	Hamburg
15:30		Report	Fritz 12'	Stadium: Volksparkstadion; Attendance: 17,750; Referee: Günther Habermann

5 May 1992 36	Karlsruher SC	0–2	Eintracht Frankfurt	Karlsruhe
20:00		Report	Yeboah 16'; Gründel 66'	Stadium: Wildparkstadion; Attendance: 28,000; Referee: Hans-Joachim Osmers

9 May 1992 37	1. FC Nürnberg	1–2	Karlsruher SC	Nuremberg
15:30	Wück 60'	Report	Scholl 75'; Krieg 86'	Stadium: Frankenstadion; Attendance: 36,000; Referee: Gerhard Theobald

16 May 1992 36	Karlsruher SC	3–0	Bayern Munich	Karlsruhe
15:30	Shmarov 57'; Reich 69'; Krieg 75'	Report		Stadium: Wildparkstadion; Attendance: 24,000; Referee: Michael Prengel

=== DFB Pokal ===
18 August 1991 Second round	Rot-Weiss Essen	0–2	Karlsruher SC	Essen
15:00		Report	Reichert 73'; Scholl 80'	Stadium: Georg-Melches-Stadion; Attendance: 5,600; Referee: Georg Dardenne

3 September 1991 Third round	Eintracht Frankfurt	0–1	Karlsruher SC	Frankfurt
20:30		Report	Harforth 79'	Stadium: Waldstadion; Attendance: 10,600; Referee: Manfred Führer

24 September 1991 Round of 16	Hamburger SV II	0–1	Karlsruher SC	Norderstedt
16:30		Report	Schütterle 31' (pen.)	Stadium: Edmund-Plambeck-Stadion; Attendance: 2,600; Referee: Peter Richmann

30 October 1991 Quarter-finals	Hannover 96	1–0	Karlsruher SC	Hanover
20:00	Kuhlmey 1'	Report		Stadium: Niedersachsenstadion; Attendance: 28,000; Referee: Lothar Löwer

== Statistics ==
=== Squad statistics ===
No.	Pos	Nat	Player	Total		Bundesliga		DFB-Pokal	
No.	Pos	Nat	Player	Apps	Goals	Apps	Goals	Apps	Goals
	GK	(Germany) GER	Alexander Famulla	3	0	1	0	2	0
	GK	(Germany) GER	Oliver Kahn	39	0	37	0	2	0
	DF	(Germany) GER	Ralph Bany	4	0	3	0	1	0
	DF	(Socialist Federal Republic of Yugoslavia) YUG	Srećko Bogdan	38	0	34	0	4	0
	DF	(Germany) GER	Gunther Metz	42	2	38	2	4	0
	DF	(Germany) GER	Jens Nowotny	4	0	4	0	0	0
	DF	(Germany) GER	Marc Rapp	6	0	6	0	0	0
	DF	(Germany) GER	Burkhard Reich	33	4	31	4	2	0
	DF	(Germany) GER	Dirk Schuster	34	0	30	0	4	0
	DF	(Germany) GER	Oliver Westerbeek	12	0	10	0	2	0
	DF	(Germany) GER	Michael Wittwer	15	1	13	1	2	0
	MF	(Germany) GER	Matthias Fritz	11	1	11	1	0	0
	MF	(Germany) GER	Michael Harforth	29	1	25	0	4	1
	MF	(Germany) GER	Wolfgang Rolff	40	5	37	5	3	0
	MF	(Germany) GER	Lars Schmidt	40	2	36	2	4	0
	MF	(Germany) GER	Mehmet Scholl	30	5	28	4	2	1
	MF	(Germany) GER	Rainer Schütterle	35	11	31	10	4	1
	FW	(Germany) GER	Eberhard Carl	35	4	32	4	3	0
	FW	(Germany) GER	Arno Glesius	2	1	2	1	0	0
	FW	(Germany) GER	Helmut Hermann	17	2	14	2	3	0
	FW	(Germany) GER	Rainer Krieg	7	3	7	3	0	0
	FW	(Germany) GER	Stefan Mees	5	0	5	0	0	0
	FW	(Germany) GER	Peter Reichert	12	2	10	1	2	1
	FW	(Russia) RUS	Valeri Shmarov	34	6	31	6	3	0
