= 1993–94 Karlsruher SC season =

Karlsruher SC
1993–94 season
- Manager: Winfried Schäfer
- Stadium: Wildparkstadion
- Bundesliga: 6th
- DFB-Pokal: Third round
- UEFA Cup: Semi-finals
- Top goalscorer: League: Three players (Note: Manfred Bender, Sergei Kiriakov, and Edgar Schmitt) (9); All: Edgar Schmitt (17)

During the 1993–94 season, Karlsruher SC played in the Bundesliga, the highest tier of the German football league system.

== Season summary ==
Karlsruher SC repeated last season's sixth-place finish, and reached the semi-finals of the UEFA Cup before elimination by Casino Salzburg on away goals.

== Players ==
=== First team squad ===
Squad at end of season

No.	Pos.	Nation	Player
—	GK	GER	Oliver Kahn
—	GK	GER	Oliver Schneider
—	GK	GER	Thomas Walter
—	DF	GER	Heiko Bonan
—	DF	GER	Martin Jung
—	DF	GER	Dirk Klinge
—	DF	GER	Gunther Metz
—	DF	GER	Peter Neustädter (Note: Neustädter was born in Kara-Balta, Kirghiz SSR, Soviet Union (now Kyrgyzstan), but also qualified to represent Germany, Ukraine, and Kazakhstan internationally, holds German citizenship, and made his international debut for Kazakhstan in 1996.)
—	DF	GER	Jens Nowotny
—	DF	GER	Burkhard Reich
—	DF	GER	Lars Schmidt
—	DF	GER	Dirk Schuster
—	DF	GER	Michael Wittwer
—	DF	YUG	Pero Škorić

No.	Pos.	Nation	Player
—	DF	CRO	Slaven Bilić
—	MF	GER	Markus Bähr
—	MF	GER	Manfred Bender
—	MF	GER	Matthias Fritz
—	MF	GER	Wolfgang Rolff
—	MF	GER	Javier Sanchez
—	MF	GER	Rainer Schütterle
—	MF	DEN	Christian Flindt Bjerg (Note: Bjerg was born in Innsbruck, Austria, but also holds Danish citizenship.)
—	MF	RUS	Sergei Kiriakov
—	FW	GER	Eberhard Carl
—	FW	GER	Rainer Krieg
—	FW	GER	Karl-Heinz Lutz
—	FW	GER	Edgar Schmitt
—	FW	RUS	Valeri Shmarov

== Transfers ==
=== In ===
- (Germany) Edgar Schmitt - (Germany) Eintracht Frankfurt
- (Croatia) Slaven Bilić - (Croatia) Hajduk Split
- (Germany) Heiko Bonan - (Germany) VfL Bochum
- (Federal Republic of Yugoslavia) Pero Škorić - (Germany) SC 08 Bamberg
