= 1991–92 FC Schalke 04 season =

FC Schalke 04
1991–92 season
- Manager: Aleksandar Ristić (to 25 April); Klaus Fischer (from 2 May)
- Stadium: Parkstadion
- Bundesliga: 11th
- DFB-Pokal: Second round
- Top goalscorer: League: Ingo Anderbrügge; Peter Sendscheid (7); All: Ingo Anderbrügge; Peter Sendscheid (7)

The 1991–92 FC Schalke 04 season was the 68th season in the club's history and the first season playing in the Bundesliga since promotion from 2. Bundesliga in 1991. Schalke finished eleventh in the league.

The club also participated in the DFB-Pokal where it was eliminated in the second round by Rot-Weiß Erfurt.

== Competitions ==
=== Overview ===
Competition	First match	Last match	Starting round	Final position	Record							
Competition	First match	Last match	Starting round	Final position	Pld	W	D	L	GF	GA	GD	Win %
Bundesliga	3 August 1991	16 May 1992	Matchday 1	11th	38	11	12	15	45	45	+0	28.95
DFB-Pokal	17 August 1991	17 August 1991	Second round	Second round	1	0	0	1	1	2	−1	0.00
Total					39	11	12	16	46	47	−1	28.21

Source: Competitions

=== Bundesliga ===
==== League table ====
Pos	Team	Pld	W	D	L	GF	GA	GD	Pts	Qualification or relegation
9	Werder Bremen	38	11	16	11	44	45	−1	38	Qualification to Cup Winners' Cup first round
10	Bayern Munich	38	13	10	15	59	61	−2	36	
11	Schalke 04	38	11	12	15	45	45	0	34	
12	Hamburger SV	38	9	16	13	32	43	−11	34	
13	Borussia Mönchengladbach	38	10	14	14	37	49	−12	34	

Source: www.dfb.de
Rules for classification: 1) points; 2) goal difference; 3) number of goals scored.
The league contracted back to 18 teams for the 1992–93 season.

==== Matches ====
3 August 1991 1	Schalke 04	0–0	Hamburger SV	Gelsenkirchen
15:30		Report		Stadium: Parkstadion; Attendance: 54,200; Referee: Gerhard Theobald

10 August 1991 2	Eintracht Frankfurt	5–0	Schalke 04	Frankfurt
15:30	Kruse 13', 80'; Sippel 53'; Möller 56', 77'	Report		Stadium: Waldstadion; Attendance: 44,000; Referee: Hans-Joachim Osmers

14 August 1991 3	Schalke 04	1–0	1. FC Nürnberg	Gelsenkirchen
20:00	Freund 8'	Report		Stadium: Parkstadion; Attendance: 41,200; Referee: Werner Föckler

20 August 1991 4	Bayern Munich	3–2	Schalke 04	Munich
20:00	Bender 30'; Effenberg 38' (pen.); Labbadia 54'	Report	Sendscheid 52'; Güttler 62' (pen.)	Stadium: Olympiastadion; Attendance: 43,000; Referee: Michael Malbranc

24 August 1991 5	Schalke 04	5–2	Borussia Dortmund	Gelsenkirchen
15:30	Anderbrügge 2'; Güttler 63' (pen.); Luginger 72'; Schlipper 89'; Sendscheid 90'	Report	Schulz 36'; Chapuisat 86'	Stadium: Parkstadion; Attendance: 70,200; Referee: Manfred Neuner

27 August 1991 6	VfB Stuttgart	1–0	Schalke 04	Stuttgart
20:00	Sammer 44'	Report		Stadium: Neckarstadion; Attendance: 45,000; Referee: Lutz Michael Fröhlich

30 August 1991 7	Schalke 04	3–1	Borussia Mönchengladbach	Gelsenkirchen
20:00	Flad 19'; Anderbrügge 44'; Klinkert 74' (o.g.)	Report	Klinkert 59'	Stadium: Parkstadion; Attendance: 55,600; Referee: Klaus-Dieter Stenzel

7 September 1991 8	SG Wattenscheid 09	1–2	Schalke 04	Bochum-Wattenscheid
15:30	Tschiskale 28'	Report	Flad 45'; Sendscheid 72'	Stadium: Lohrheidestadion; Attendance: 30,000; Referee: Manfred Harder

14 September 1991 9	Schalke 04	2–2	Bayer Leverkusen	Gelsenkirchen
15:30	Weichert 13'; Spies 71'	Report	Kree 45', 61' (pen.)	Stadium: Parkstadion; Attendance: 43,000; Referee: Hermann Albrecht

22 September 1991 10	MSV Duisburg	2–0	Schalke 04	Duisburg
18:00	Lyutyi 19'; Tönnies 50'	Report		Stadium: Wedaustadion; Attendance: 30,135; Referee: Hans-Peter Dellwing

28 September 1991 11	Schalke 04	3–1	Karlsruher SC	Gelsenkirchen
15:30	Schlipper 49'; Luginger 68'; Borodyuk 82'	Report	Hermann 34'	Stadium: Parkstadion; Attendance: 31,300; Referee: Alfons Berg

5 October 1991 12	Werder Bremen	2–1	Schalke 04	Bremen
15:30	Neubarth 36'; Legat 50'	Report	Borodyuk 68'	Stadium: Weser-Stadion; Attendance: 25,350; Referee: Günther Habermann

12 October 1991 13	Schalke 04	5–0	Hansa Rostock	Gelsenkirchen
15:30	Christensen 1'; Güttler 11'; Borodyuk 63'; Leifeld 83', 86'	Report		Stadium: Parkstadion; Attendance: 52,100; Referee: Rainer Boos

19 October 1991 14	Fortuna Düsseldorf	1–1	Schalke 04	Düsseldorf
15:30	Allofs 36'	Report	Sendscheid 13'	Stadium: Rheinstadion; Attendance: 40,000; Referee: Manfred Amerell

26 October 1991 15	Stuttgarter Kickers	1–1	Schalke 04	Stuttgart
15:30	Vollmer 67'	Report	Anderbrügge 8'	Stadium: Neckarstadion; Attendance: 12,000; Referee: Karl-Heinz Gläser

2 November 1991 16	Schalke 04	1–1	Dynamo Dresden	Gelsenkirchen
15:30	Christensen 66'	Report	Rösler 5'	Stadium: Parkstadion; Attendance: 43,700; Referee: Hans Fux

9 November 1991 17	VfL Bochum	1–0	Schalke 04	Bochum
15:30	Wegmann 89'	Report		Stadium: Ruhrstadion; Attendance: 41,000; Referee: Eugen Strigel

16 November 1991 18	Schalke 04	3–0	1. FC Köln	Gelsenkirchen
15:30	Anderbrügge 17' (pen.); Borodyuk 72'; Sendscheid 80'	Report		Stadium: Parkstadion; Attendance: 61,400; Referee: Markus Merk

23 November 1991 19	1. FC Kaiserslautern	1–1	Schalke 04	Kaiserslautern
15:30	Kuntz 20'	Report	Müller 45'	Stadium: Fritz-Walter-Stadion; Attendance: 38,500; Referee: Hans-Jürgen Kasper

30 November 1991 20	Hamburger SV	2–1	Schalke 04	Hamburg
15:30	Furtok 64', 70'	Report	Christensen 90'	Stadium: Volksparkstadion; Attendance: 23,197; Referee: Hans Scheuerer

5 December 1991 21	Schalke 04	1–1	Eintracht Frankfurt	Gelsenkirchen
20:00	Anderbrügge 89' (pen.)	Report	Andersen 25'	Stadium: Parkstadion; Attendance: 45,100; Referee: Wolf-Günter Wiesel

14 December 1991 22	1. FC Nürnberg	0–1	Schalke 04	Nürnberg
15:30		Report	Christensen 46'	Stadium: Frankenstadion; Attendance: 47,000; Referee: Lutz Michael Fröhlich

8 February 1992 23	Schalke 04	1–1	Bayern Munich	Gelsenkirchen
15:30	Mihajlović 87'	Report	Wohlfarth 53'	Stadium: Parkstadion; Attendance: 70,000; Referee: Hans-Peter Dellwing

15 February 1992 24	Borussia Dortmund	2–0	Schalke 04	Dortmund
15:30	Chapuisat 29'; Reinhardt 74'	Report		Stadium: Westfalenstadion; Attendance: 52,000; Referee: Werner Föckler

22 February 1992 25	Schalke 04	0–1	VfB Stuttgart	Gelsenkirchen
15:30		Report	Sammer 72'	Stadium: Parkstadion; Attendance: 40,300; Referee: Hans-Jürgen Kasper

29 February 1992 26	Borussia Mönchengladbach	1–1	Schalke 04	Mönchengladbach
15:30	Criens 73'	Report	Müller 90'	Stadium: Bökelbergstadion; Attendance: 34,000; Referee: Hans-Peter Best

6 March 1992 27	Schalke 04	1–1	SG Wattenscheid 09	Gelsenkirchen
20:00	Anderbrügge 18' (pen.)	Report	Schupp 75'	Stadium: Parkstadion; Attendance: 41,000; Referee: Hans Scheuerer

14 March 1992 28	Bayer Leverkusen	2–1	Schalke 04	Leverkusen
15:30	Kirsten 30'; Jorginho 35'	Report	Christensen 12'	Stadium: Ulrich-Haberland-Stadion; Attendance: 22,000; Referee: Rainer Boos

21 March 1992 29	Schalke 04	3–0	MSV Duisburg	Gelsenkirchen
15:30	Borodyuk 15'; Sendscheid 31'; Mihajlović 62'	Report		Stadium: Parkstadion; Attendance: 43,200; Referee: Manfred Neuner

28 March 1992 30	Karlsruher SC	1–0	Schalke 04	Karlsruhe
15:30	Carl 1'	Report		Stadium: Wildparkstadion; Attendance: 21,000; Referee: Hermann Albrecht

4 April 1992 31	Schalke 04	0–0	Werder Bremen	Gelsenkirchen
15:30		Report		Stadium: Parkstadion; Attendance: 40,100; Referee: Manfred Amerell

10 April 1992 32	Hansa Rostock	2–0	Schalke 04	Rostock
20:00	Bodden 13'; Weichert 61'	Report		Stadium: Ostseestadion; Attendance: 13,000; Referee: Gerhard Theobald

18 April 1992 33	Schalke 04	0–0	Fortuna Düsseldorf	Gelsenkirchen
15:30		Report		Stadium: Parkstadion; Attendance: 31,900; Referee: Eugen Strigel

25 April 1992 34	Schalke 04	1–2	Stuttgarter Kickers	Gelsenkirchen
15:30	Sendscheid 87'	Report	Moutas 15' (40)	Stadium: Parkstadion; Attendance: 24,860; Referee: Günther Habermann

2 May 1992 35	Dynamo Dresden	2–1	Schalke 04	Dresden
15:30	Zander 39'; Kmetsch 84'	Report	Güttler 73'	Stadium: Rudolf-Harbig-Stadion; Attendance: 26,000; Referee: Bernd Heynemann

5 May 1992 36	Schalke 04	2–1	VfL Bochum	Gelsenkirchen
20:00	Anderbrügge 13' (pen.); Christensen 19'	Report	Wegmann 84'	Stadium: Parkstadion; Attendance: 51,200; Referee: Karl-Josef Assenmacher

9 May 1992 37	1. FC Köln	3–0	Schalke 04	Köln
15:30	Flick 45'; Andersen 70'; H. Fuchs 90'	Report		Stadium: Müngersdorfer Stadion; Attendance: 47,000; Referee: Hans Fux

16 May 1992 38	Schalke 04	2–0	1. FC Kaiserslautern	Gelsenkirchen
15:30	Flad 22'; Mihajlović 74'	Report		Stadium: Parkstadion; Attendance: 61,200; Referee: Hartmut Strampe

=== DFB Pokal ===
17 August 1991 Second round	Rot-Weiß Erfurt	2–1	Schalke 04	Erfurt
15:30	Abel 4'; Böttcher 78'	Report	Borodyuk 73'	Stadium: Steigerwaldstadion; Attendance: 14,000; Referee: Manfred Amerell

== Statistics ==
=== Squad statistics ===
No.	Pos	Nat	Player	Total		Bundesliga		DFB-Pokal	
No.	Pos	Nat	Player	Apps	Goals	Apps	Goals	Apps	Goals
	GK	(Germany) GER	Jens Lehmann	38	0	37	0	1	0
	GK	(Germany) GER	Jürgen Welp	1	0	1	0	0	0
	DF	(Germany) GER	Yves Eigenrauch	19	0	19	0	0	0
	DF	(Germany) GER	Jürgen Gredig	5	0	5	0	0	0
	DF	(Germany) GER	Günter Güttler	38	4	37	4	1	0
	DF	(Germany) GER	Hendrik Herzog	25	0	25	0	0	0
	DF	(Germany) GER	Richard Mademann	24	0	23	0	1	0
	DF	(Germany) GER	Michael Prus	20	0	19	0	1	0
	DF	(Germany) GER	Dietmar Schacht	6	0	5	0	1	0
	DF	(Germany) GER	Markus Schwiderowski	4	0	4	0	0	0
	MF	(Germany) GER	Ingo Anderbrügge	35	7	35	7	0	0
	MF	(Russia) RUS	Aleksandr Borodyuk	31	6	30	5	1	1
	MF	(Germany) GER	Henning Bürger	6	0	5	0	1	0
	MF	(Germany) GER	Egon Flad	28	3	27	3	1	0
	MF	(Germany) GER	Steffen Freund	34	1	33	1	1	0
	MF	(Germany) GER	Andreas Gaber	3	0	3	0	0	0
	MF	(Germany) GER	Michael Kroninger	5	0	5	0	0	0
	MF	(Germany) GER	Jürgen Luginger	39	2	38	2	1	0
	MF	(Germany) GER	Andreas Müller	12	2	12	2	0	0
	MF	(Germany) GER	Mark Schierenberg	2	0	2	0	0	0
	MF	(Germany) GER	Günter Schlipper	28	2	27	2	1	0
	FW	(Germany) GER	Rainer Borgmeier	1	0	1	0	0	0
	FW	(Denmark) DEN	Bent Christensen	27	6	26	6	1	0
	FW	(Germany) GER	Uwe Leifeld	20	2	20	2	0	0
	FW	(Socialist Federal Republic of Yugoslavia) YUG	Radmilo Mihajlović	16	3	16	3	0	0
	FW	(Germany) GER	Peter Sendscheid	36	7	35	7	1	0
