= Bany =

Bany may refer to:

== People ==
- Banyingela Kasonga, also known as Bany
- Briana Bany, also known as Briana Banks (born 1979), German-American pornographic actress and model
- Ralph Bany (born 1964), German football player
- William Nyuon Bany (died 1996), Southern Sudanese politician

== Places ==
- Bougoutoub-Bany, Senegal
