= Jens Lehmann =

German footballer (born 1969)

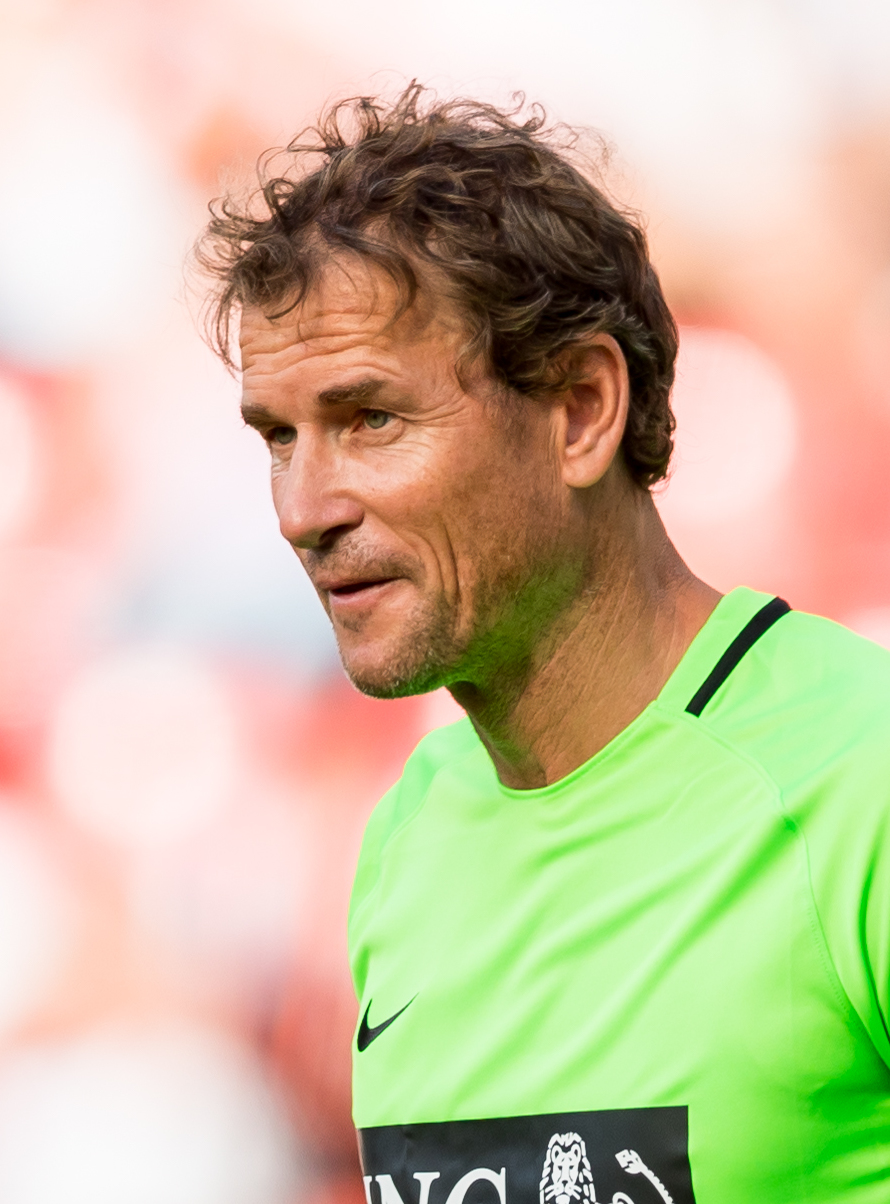
- Lehmann in a charity match in 2019

Personal information
- Full name: Jens Gerhard Lehmann
- Date of birth: 10 November 1969 (age 57)
- Place of birth: Essen, West Germany
- Height: 1.93 m (6 ft 4 in)
- Position: Goalkeeper

Senior career*
| Years | Team | Apps | (Gls) |
| 1987–1998 | Schalke 04 | 274 | (2) |
| 1998–1999 | AC Milan | 5 | (0) |
| 1999–2003 | Borussia Dortmund | 129 | (0) |
| 2003–2008 | Arsenal | 147 | (0) |
| 2008–2010 | VfB Stuttgart | 65 | (0) |
| 2011 | Arsenal | 1 | (0) |
| Total | | 621 | (2) |

International career
| 1989–1990 | West Germany U21 | 6 | (0) |
| 1998–2008 | Germany | 61 | (0) |
Medal record
Men's football
Representing Germany
FIFA World Cup
| Runner-up | 2002 |
| Third place | 2006 |
UEFA European Championship
| Runner-up | 2008 |
FIFA Confederations Cup
| Third place | 2005 |
- * Club domestic league appearances and goals

Jens Gerhard Lehmann (pronounced [ˈjɛns ˈleːman]; born 10 November 1969) is a German professional football coach and former player who played as a goalkeeper. He was a member of Arsenal's "Invincibles", playing every match of their unbeaten title-winning season. He holds the UEFA Champions League record for the most consecutive clean sheets, not conceding a single goal in eight consecutive full matches while he played for Arsenal. He also has the highest number of continuous minutes without conceding goals. In total, this lasted 853 minutes. He is regarded as one of the best goalkeepers of his generation.

Lehmann was voted UEFA Club Goalkeeper of the Year for the 1996–97 and 2005–06 seasons, and was selected for three World Cup squads.

== Club career ==
=== Schalke 04 ===
Lehmann started his career in the 1988–89 season with Schalke 04, playing for them for nearly a decade. His first years were rocky, notably a game against Bayer Leverkusen in 1993 in which he conceded three goals and was substituted after 45 minutes, causing him to flee the stadium alone by tram rather than taking the team bus, but Lehmann gradually established himself as a strong keeper lauded for his ability to intercept crosses.

He scored his first league goal on 12 March 1995 in a 6–2 victory over 1860 Munich in the 84th minute, scoring Schalke's sixth goal from the penalty spot. His second goal was a last-minute equaliser scored against bitter rivals, Borussia Dortmund, in the Revierderby on 19 December 1997.

Lehmann became Schalke's team hero in their 1997 UEFA Cup Final victory over Inter Milan, after playing a strong season and saving an Iván Zamorano penalty in a penalty shootout.

=== AC Milan ===
Lehmann left Schalke for AC Milan in 1998, but his performances were below par. In one game Gabriel Batistuta scored a hat-trick against him, including a goal from a free kick in the box which Lehmann had conceded by handling a back pass. In another game he was substituted after giving away a penalty. After just five matches, Lehmann was dropped. Believing he wouldn't get another chance at Milan, he left during the winter.

=== Borussia Dortmund ===
In early 1999, Lehmann returned to Germany to play for Borussia Dortmund replacing long-time goalkeeper Stefan Klos. Lehmann had a difficult start there after several poor performances. Rumors arose that Lehmann might leave, with supporters viewing him critically.

But the tide eventually turned and Lehmann's form improved, becoming a reliable figure in the team. He played a significant part in the club's return to the upper echelons of German and European football. Borussia Dortmund began the 2001–02 season strongly and eventually won the Bundesliga in 2001–02. That same year, Borussia Dortmund reached the UEFA-Cup final, though the team lost to Dutch club Feyenoord Rotterdam.

Around this time, Lehmann developed a reputation for his poor disciplinary record. In a match against SC Freiburg, Lehmann kicked opposing attacker Soumaila Coulibaly after they collided in the penalty area. Lehmann was suspended afterwards. He currently holds the record for most red cards for any Borussia Dortmund player, and the record for most red cards for a goalkeeper in the German Bundesliga.

Lehmann's form slipped in the 2002–03 season, along with Borussia Dortmund's. His time at Dortmund was winding down, and after the season concluded, he left Dortmund. He was replaced by Roman Weidenfeller and Guillaume Warmuz, who had just left Arsenal.

=== Arsenal ===
==== 2003–04 season ====
Lehmann joined Arsenal on 25 July 2003 replacing the recently departed David Seaman. Arsenal's 2003–04 season was historic. The Gunners finished the 2003–04 FA Premier League season unbeaten, becoming the first English club to accomplish the feat in the modern era and only the second to ever have an unbeaten season in English football's top tier, the only other team to accomplish this feat being Preston North End in the 1888–89 season. Lehmann played every match in Arsenal's unbeaten season, though his swashbuckling playing style did lead to occasional mistakes. For example, in the title-winning match at local rivals Tottenham Hotspur, Lehmann pushed Tottenham striker Robbie Keane as the pair waited for a Tottenham corner. He also committed an error that led to the equalising goal in Arsenal's Champions League defeat at home to Chelsea the same season. Despite these mistakes, Lehmann's addition to the Arsenal team had a major effect on Arsenal's ability to finish unbeaten. And Arsenal continued unbeaten until 24 October 2004. At the end of his first season at Arsenal, he had already played 54 times earning himself a Premier League winners medal.

==== 2004–05 season ====
By the middle of the 2004–05 season, Lehmann's inconsistent form lead to Spaniard Manuel Almunia starting in several matches instead. However, Almunia made a series of mistakes during several games, thus allowing Lehmann to regain his position. At the end of that season, as speculation again began to mount that he would be replaced over the summer, Lehmann cemented his position in the Arsenal goal with a man-of-the-match performance against Manchester United in the 2005 FA Cup Final. He made several important saves and demonstrated great positional sense to keep the score 0–0 after extra time, and then crucially saved Paul Scholes' shot in the penalty shootout, which Arsenal won 5–4.

==== 2005–06 season ====
Lehmann had an outstanding 2005–06 season with Arsenal, making his 100th Premier League appearance for the club in their game against West Bromwich Albion on 15 April 2006. He was a key factor in his side's first-ever accession to the Champions League final; during their run Arsenal broke the record for the most consecutive clean sheets in the Champions League with ten, breaking the record of seven that Milan had set just one year before. That run formed the bulk of an 853-minute spell without conceding a goal, overtaking the CL record for an individual goalkeeper set by Edwin van der Sar.

Bayern Munich's Hasan Salihamidžić had been the last to net against Lehmann, in the 64th minute of a last 16 first leg match on 22 February 2005; Lehmann kept a clean sheet in the second leg, and then a further seven during Arsenal's run in 2005–06 (Almunia played in the other five matches in the group stages). The final clean sheet was earned in the semi-finals against Villarreal, after Lehmann saved an 89th minute Juan Román Riquelme penalty. In the final against Barcelona, with the score still goalless, Lehmann was sent off in the 18th minute for a professional foul after bringing down Samuel Eto'o, making him the first player and – so far – only goalkeeper to ever be sent off in a Champions League/European Cup final. Arsenal would go on to lose 2–1 despite having the lead at half-time, but that did not stop him from being named the Champions League Goalkeeper of the Year for the 2005–06 season after going 853 minutes without conceding a goal.

==== 2006–07 season ====
His remarkable run was finally ended on 13 September 2006 by Hamburger SV's Boubacar Sanogo, who scored a consolation goal in the 89th minute of Arsenal's first group stage match of the 2006–07 Champions League season.

Lehmann's contract at Arsenal was due to expire in summer 2007 and during the 2006–07 season there was much speculation he would leave the club on a Bosman transfer. However, it was reported on 26 April 2007 that he had signed a year's extension on his contract, tying him to the club until 2008.

==== 2007–08 season ====
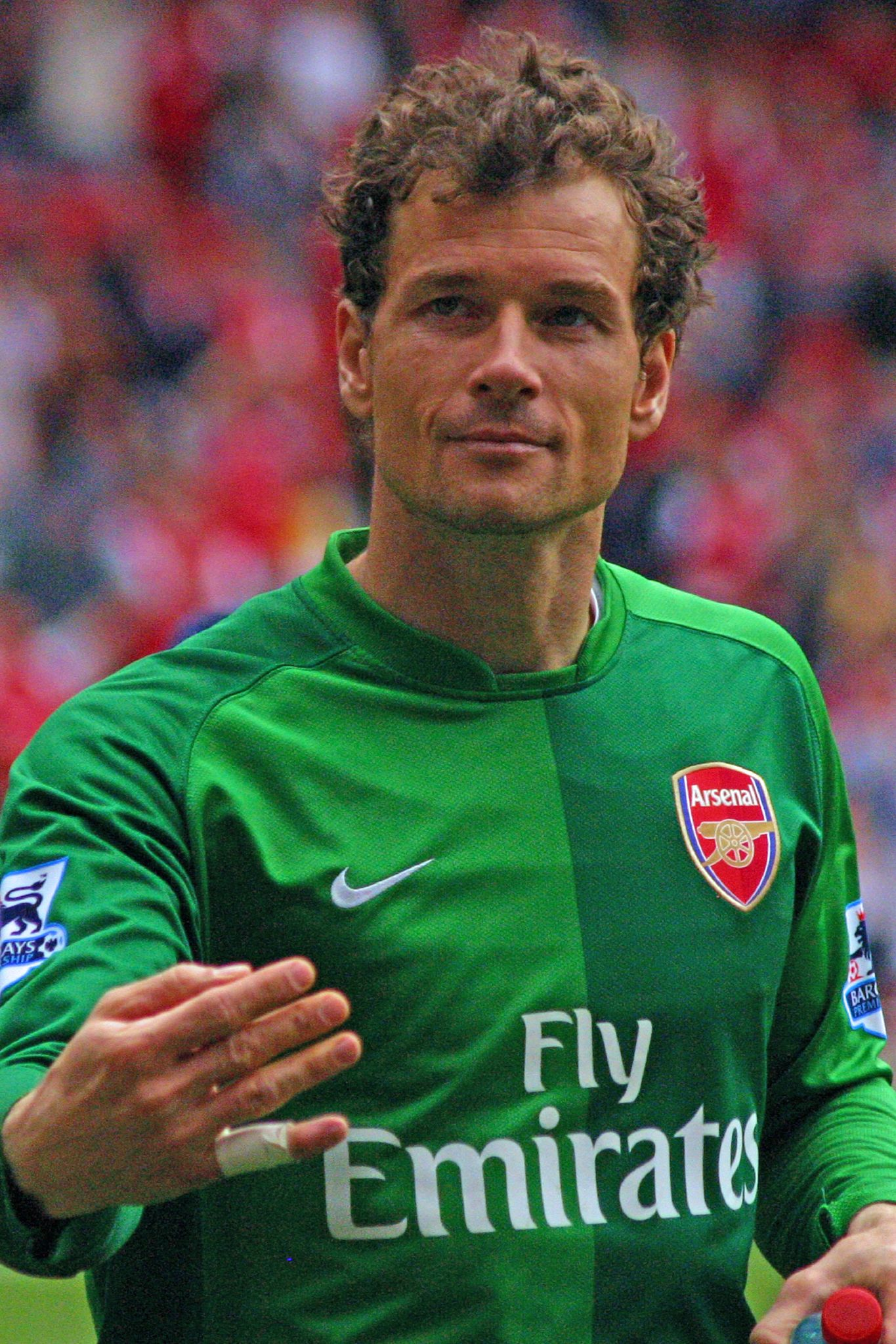
Lehmann playing for Arsenal in 2007

In the first league game of the 2007–08 season, Lehmann made a serious error after just 52 seconds, allowing David Healy to score for Fulham. However, Lehmann's blushes were spared late in the game as Arsenal won 2–1. In his second league match against Blackburn Rovers he fumbled a David Dunn shot to allow Blackburn to equalise, in a game that finished 1–1. On 24 August, the BBC reported that he returned to Germany to treat an Achilles tendon injury which he picked up during international duty against England, meaning Manuel Almunia took his place for Arsenal's third match.

Lehmann subsequently had to wait nearly four months to make another competitive appearance for Arsenal, which came in their final Champions League group match against Steaua Bucharest. Nearly one month later, he played only his fifth competitive game of the season for Arsenal, against Burnley in the third round of the FA Cup; meanwhile third-choice goalkeeper Łukasz Fabiański was selected for the League Cup games. Lehmann expressed frustration at being number two to Manuel Almunia fearing it could cost him the number one jersey in the Germany national team for Euro 2008. However, Arsenal manager Arsène Wenger described Lehmann's attitude as "super-professional".

On 26 January 2008, Lehmann appeared in Arsenal's second FA Cup game of the season, keeping his second successive clean sheet as Arsenal beat Newcastle United 3–0. Manager Arsène Wenger later promised Lehmann that, if he stayed at Arsenal, he would play every game in the FA Cup. On 29 January, Lehmann suggested that he will stick with Arsenal until his contract expires at the end of the season. Lehmann gave his reasons as his relationship with the fans, players, family situations and his chance to still be able to win things at the club; believing he "wouldn't have had this chance somewhere else." On 2 February, following an injury to Almunia, Lehmann returned in goal for Arsenal in the Premiership for an away fixture against Manchester City, more than five months after his last league appearance; Arsenal won the match 3–1. Due to Almunia catching flu straight after the injury, Lehmann kept his place in goal for the following three matches in February, including the first leg of the UEFA Champions League round of 16 against Milan, but also the 4–0 loss to arch rivals Manchester United in the FA Cup.

After another injury to Almunia in early April 2008, Lehmann was back in goal for the away game against Manchester United on 13 April 2008. Arsenal lost that game 2–1, virtually ending their Premier League title hopes for the season, their third consecutive season without a major trophy. There was speculation that would be his last game for Arsenal, but on 19 April, Lehmann played in the home game against Reading, which Arsenal won 2–0. The following week, Łukasz Fabiański was given his Premier League debut against Derby County and Almunia returned to the bench for the game. However, Lehmann made another appearance and was brought on for Fabiański in the last 20 minutes of the game against Everton on 4 May, Arsenal's final home game of the season. He was given a standing ovation after the match as he bowed and clapped to the fans. Later that day, Wenger confirmed that it was Lehmann's farewell appearance.

=== VfB Stuttgart ===
In early June 2008, it was announced that Lehmann had signed a one-year contract for VfB Stuttgart. He joined the team's pre-season training on 24 July 2008, and made his debut for the club on 30 July 2008 in a friendly match against former team Arsenal. His competitive debut for the club came on 10 August 2008 in the first round of the DFB-Pokal, a 5–0 away victory over FC Hansa Lüneburg, and his Bundesliga debut one week later in Stuttgart's 3–1 away victory at Borussia Mönchengladbach.

On 3 April 2009, Lehmann extended his contract at VfB Stuttgart until the summer of 2010 and in August 2009, he announced that he would retire on 30 June 2010.

=== Return to Arsenal ===
On 14 March 2011, German tabloid Bild reported that Lehmann was in talks to come out of retirement, due to an injury crisis at Arsenal leaving them with only one fit senior keeper, Manuel Almunia. Lehmann was also scheduled to spend six weeks working on his coaching badges at his old club. Due to the injury of Arsenal goalkeepers Wojciech Szczęsny, Łukasz Fabiański and Vito Mannone, on 17 March 2011 Lehmann signed for Arsenal on a rolling contract until the end of the season. Lehmann was named as a substitute in Arsenal's match against West Bromwich Albion on 19 March 2011. Despite newspaper reports that he might replace Almunia, due to the Spaniard's poor performances, Lehmann made his first appearance in Arsenal's reserves on 29 March 2011 against Wigan, when Arsenal lost 2–1.

On 10 April 2011, Lehmann started for the first team in an away game against Blackpool. He was forced to start the game when Almunia was injured in the warm up. Winning 3–1, it was his 200th appearance for Arsenal. Lehmann became the oldest player to play for Arsenal in the Premier League but not the oldest to play for the Gunners in all competitions, a record held by Jock Rutherford. Lehmann's contract with Arsenal expired at the end of the season, and then he decided to retire once again.

On 8 September 2018, a match was organised between Arsenal legends and Real Madrid legends in which Lehmann appeared after David Seaman picked up injury during training. He eventually made two saves in the second half and then saved a shot from Alfonso in the subsequent penalty shoot out. Arsenal legends won 5–3 on penalties, with Lehmann scoring the last penalty for Arsenal.

== International career ==
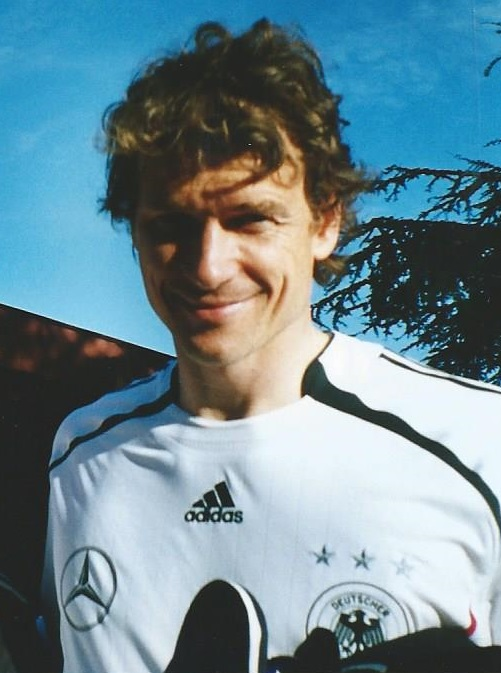
Lehmann with the Germany national team in 2006

Lehmann made his debut for the Germany national team against Oman in February 1998 and earned 61 caps for his country, 32 of which were friendlies.

He had a well-publicised rivalry with former Bayern Munich goalkeeper Oliver Kahn, whose presence long prevented Lehmann from becoming the number one goalkeeper of the national team. Lehmann was in the squad which finished as runners-up in the 2002 World Cup, but he didn't play any matches in the competition, as Kahn was still Germany's first choice goalkeeper.

On 7 April 2006, however, Germany national coach Jürgen Klinsmann announced that Lehmann would be Germany's first-choice goalkeeper for the upcoming World Cup. Lehmann conceded two goals in Germany's opening match of the World Cup, both scored by Costa Rica's Paulo Wanchope although Germany won the match 4–2. Lehmann played strongly in the next three games, conceding no goals and allowing Germany to sweep their group undefeated and beat Sweden convincingly in the Round of 16.

The highlight of Lehmann's international career came in the quarterfinal match (30 June 2006, Olympiastadion, Berlin) against Argentina. The game remained tied 1–1 after 90 minutes and extra time. The game came down to penalty kicks and Lehmann carried his team through, picking the right direction for all spot kicks, making saves from Argentinians Roberto Ayala and Esteban Cambiasso and almost saving a third. Meanwhile, the Germans made all four of the necessary spot kicks to win the penalty shoot-out 4–2. Lehmann's prowess in the shootout was aided by notes given to him before the kicks – an idea from Germany's chief scout, Swiss-born Urs Siegenthaler. Germany's goalkeeping manager, Andreas Köpke, gave Lehmann a sheet of paper with the penalty tendencies of seven of the Argentinians, with Lehmann keeping the paper in his right sock. Only two of the seven players on the note (Ayala and Maxi Rodríguez) ended up taking penalties, but Köpke had predicted both correctly and Lehmann saved Ayala's kick. Before the last shot from Cambiasso, Lehmann looked at the paper for a long time even though Cambiasso's name was not even on it. Lehmann then saved the penalty, ending the game. The story about the paper features in the film Deutschland. Ein Sommermärchen. Lehmann was considered a hero by the German public after these saves, and he received praise even from long-time rival and backup keeper Oliver Kahn.

Germany's opponent in the semifinals was Italy. The Italians had the better chances to score but Lehmann made several spectacular saves, including one in extra time where he dived out of goal to intercept an Italian player who had broken loose from the defence, punching the ball clear with his fist and temporarily knocking out the Italian in the process. He allowed two goals within a minute of each other with only a few seconds remaining in extra time, which put Italy into the World Cup final. The retiring Oliver Kahn was given the honour of starting in the third place play-off match, an offer made by Lehmann himself. Kahn was made captain for that game due to the injury to Michael Ballack. Germany defeated Portugal 3–1 for the third place (bronze) medals.

In August 2006, Lehmann revealed that during the World Cup he was suffering with a foot injury that he claims was a result of wearing different boots. The German Football Association ordered their players to wear only those manufactured by principal sponsor Adidas as opposed to Lehmann's sponsor Nike. This has now been overturned thanks to Lehmann and several other players protesting about the decision and the players are now free to wear boots made by other companies. The same month, Lehmann suggested that he may retire from league and international football after playing for Germany in Euro 2008. However, he subsequently stated in January 2007 that he had not made any decision on retirement.

Lehmann set a national team record of not conceding a goal for 681 minutes in a friendly against Switzerland on 26 March 2008. In Euro 2008, he was one of only two players born in the 1960s, with the other being Austria's Ivica Vastić. Lehmann started every match as Germany reached the final. They lost 1–0 to Spain; a lack of communication between Lehmann and Philipp Lahm allowed Spain's Fernando Torres to net the only goal in the match.

On 8 August 2008, Lehmann announced his retirement from international football. He made his decision following a two-hour talk with the Germany national team's coach Joachim Löw and goalkeeping coach Andreas Köpke, stating that he was not able to give them any guarantee that he will continue to play football following the end of his one-year contract with VfB Stuttgart in June 2009. He has since retired and subsequently worked towards his full FIFA coaching license at Arsenal.

== Style of play ==
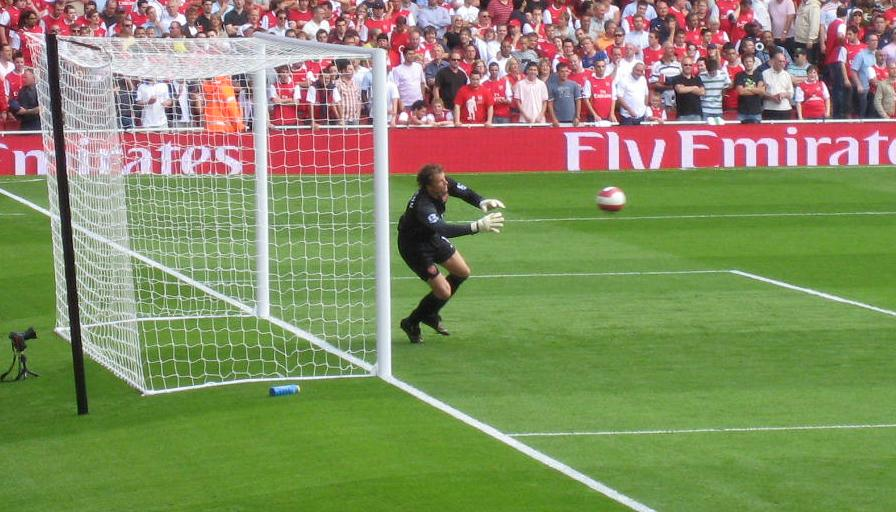
Lehmann diving to save a shot

Lehmann played at the highest international and domestic levels, as well as being one of the best goalkeepers in the history of the Premier League, and one of Arsenal's and Germany's goalkeepers, Lehmann was an experienced keeper, who was known for his agility, reflexes, strength, and acrobatic shot-stopping abilities; however, he was also known for his efficiency rather than spectacular playing style. His playing style has incorporate active distribution with wither foot, as well as his handling, physical presence, positioning, reading of the game, and his ability to come off his line and collect or punch crosses, which allowed him to command his area effectively. He was also known for his eccentric personality, and for being extremely outspoken. Moreover, media and analysts noted his communication, tactical sense, and leadership, and was also known for his ability to handle pressure and communicate with his back–line. One of the best goalkeepers of his generation, Manuel Neuer has cited Lehmann's style as an influence. As with any player, he was also known to be inconsistent at times.

== Post-playing career ==
In May 2020, Tennor Holding BV named Lehmann, among others, as its representative on the supervisory board of Hertha BSC. One year later, he was sacked after sending pundit and former footballer Dennis Aogo a WhatsApp message calling him a "quota black guy", in relation to Aogo's work as an expert at Sky. Lehmann had previously apologized via a Twitter post. In November 2024, it was announced that he's set to manage one of the 12 teams in the upcoming Baller League UK, a six-a-side football league.

== Coaching career ==
=== Arsenal ===
Ahead of the 2017–18 season, it was confirmed that Lehmann would return to Arsenal once again as assistant coach. On 19 June 2018, Arsenal confirmed that Lehmann had left the club as part of new head coach Unai Emery's coaching staff changes.

=== Augsburg ===
On 29 January 2019, he was appointed assistant coach of FC Augsburg alongside Manuel Baum, as the team were only 15th in the Bundesliga.

== Personal life ==
Lehmann and his elder brother grew up in Essen. After graduating from secondary school with A-levels (Abitur) in 1988, he studied economics at the University of Münster between 1992 and 1998 while continuing his football career.

In 1999, he married Conny, a middle school teacher. Lehmann later adopted Lasse, Conny’s son from her previous marriage to footballer Knut Reinhardt. The pair also have two children.

In September 2024, Lehmann was fined €135,000 by a court in Starnberg for damaging his neighbour's garage with a chainsaw.

=== Charity ===
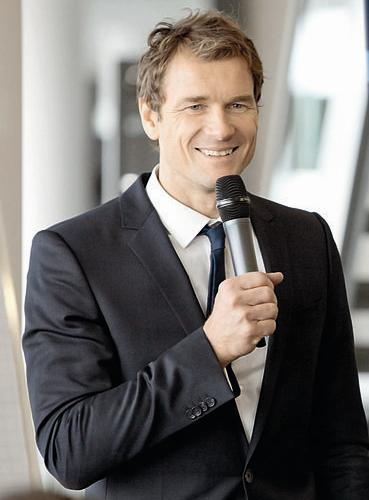
Lehmann in 2012

He is board member of the youth football foundation Stiftung Jugendfußball, founded 2000 upon the initiative of Jürgen Klinsmann. Lehmann also acts as ambassador of the foundation Power-Child Campus South Africa that supports children affected by HIV and well as foundations of Bert Trautmann, Christoph Metzelder and former Arsenal goalkeeper Bob Wilson.

He participated in the Soccer Aid football match on 6 June 2010 for the Rest of the World team in aid of UNICEF.

=== Acting appearances ===
Lehmann made his film acting debut with the German/South African production Themba. He plays Big John Jacobs, a football coach and talent scout, who discovers Themba, a young and ambitious youth, who is faced with poverty, AIDS and violence, but eventually makes his way on to the South African national team. The movie is based on a novel by Lutz van Dijk and premiered at the Berlinale 2010.

== Career statistics ==
=== Club ===
Appearances and goals by club, season and competition
| Club | Season | League | | | National cup (Note: Includes DFB-Pokal, Coppa Italia, FA Cup) | | League cup (Note: Includes DFB-Ligapokal, Football League Cup) | | Europe | | Other | | Total | |
| Club | Season | Division | Apps | Goals | Apps | Goals | Apps | Goals | Apps | Goals | Apps | Goals | Apps | Goals |
|---|---|---|---|---|---|---|---|---|---|---|---|---|---|---|
| Schalke 04 | 1988–89 | 2. Bundesliga | 13 | 0 | 3 | 0 | — | | — | | — | | 16 | 0 |
| Schalke 04 | 1989–90 | 2. Bundesliga | 27 | 0 | 0 | 0 | — | | — | | — | | 27 | 0 |
| Schalke 04 | 1990–91 | 2. Bundesliga | 34 | 0 | 1 | 0 | — | | — | | — | | 35 | 0 |
| Schalke 04 | 1991–92 | Bundesliga | 37 | 0 | 1 | 0 | — | | — | | — | | 38 | 0 |
| Schalke 04 | 1992–93 | Bundesliga | 8 | 0 | 2 | 0 | — | | — | | — | | 10 | 0 |
| Schalke 04 | 1993–94 | Bundesliga | 21 | 0 | 1 | 0 | — | | — | | — | | 22 | 0 |
| Schalke 04 | 1994–95 | Bundesliga | 34 | 1 | 4 | 0 | — | | — | | — | | 38 | 1 |
| Schalke 04 | 1995–96 | Bundesliga | 32 | 0 | 3 | 0 | — | | — | | — | | 35 | 0 |
| Schalke 04 | 1996–97 | Bundesliga | 34 | 0 | 2 | 0 | — | | 12 (Note: Appearances in UEFA Cup) | 0 | — | | 48 | 0 |
| Schalke 04 | 1997–98 | Bundesliga | 34 | 1 | 2 | 0 | — | | 7 | 0 | — | | 43 | 1 |
| Schalke 04 | Total | | 274 | 2 | 19 | 0 | — | | 19 | 0 | — | | 312 | 2 |
| AC Milan | 1998–99 | Serie A | 5 | 0 | 1 | 0 | — | | — | | — | | 6 | 0 |
| Borussia Dortmund | 1998–99 | Bundesliga | 13 | 0 | 0 | 0 | — | | — | | — | | 13 | 0 |
| Borussia Dortmund | 1999–2000 | Bundesliga | 31 | 0 | 0 | 0 | 2 | 0 | 12 (Note: Eight appearances in UEFA Champions League, four appearances in UEFA Cup) | 0 | — | | 45 | 0 |
| Borussia Dortmund | 2000–01 | Bundesliga | 31 | 0 | 3 | 0 | — | | — | | — | | 34 | 0 |
| Borussia Dortmund | 2001–02 | Bundesliga | 30 | 0 | 0 | 0 | 2 | 0 | 17 (Note: Eight appearances in UEFA Champions League, nine appearances in UEFA Cup) | 0 | — | | 49 | 0 |
| Borussia Dortmund | 2002–03 | Bundesliga | 24 | 0 | 0 | 0 | 0 | 0 | 12 (Note: Appearances in UEFA Champions League) | 0 | — | | 36 | 0 |
| Borussia Dortmund | 2003–04 | Bundesliga | — | | — | | 2 | 0 | — | | — | | 2 | 0 |
| Borussia Dortmund | Total | | 129 | 0 | 3 | 0 | 6 | 0 | 41 | 0 | — | | 179 | 0 |
| Arsenal | 2003–04 | Premier League | 38 | 0 | 5 | 0 | 0 | 0 | 10 | 0 | 1 (Note: Appearance in FA Community Shield) | 0 | 54 | 0 |
| Arsenal | 2004–05 | Premier League | 28 | 0 | 5 | 0 | 0 | 0 | 7 | 0 | 1 | 0 | 41 | 0 |
| Arsenal | 2005–06 | Premier League | 38 | 0 | 0 | 0 | 0 | 0 | 8 | 0 | 1 | 0 | 47 | 0 |
| Arsenal | 2006–07 | Premier League | 36 | 0 | 0 | 0 | 0 | 0 | 8 | 0 | — | | 44 | 0 |
| Arsenal | 2007–08 | Premier League | 7 | 0 | 3 | 0 | 0 | 0 | 3 | 0 | — | | 13 | 0 |
| Arsenal | Total | | 147 | 0 | 13 | 0 | 0 | 0 | 36 | 0 | 3 | 0 | 199 | 0 |
| VfB Stuttgart | 2008–09 | Bundesliga | 34 | 0 | 3 | 0 | — | | 10 | 0 | — | | 47 | 0 |
| VfB Stuttgart | 2009–10 | Bundesliga | 31 | 0 | 2 | 0 | — | | 10 | 0 | — | | 43 | 0 |
| VfB Stuttgart | Total | | 65 | 0 | 5 | 0 | — | | 20 | 0 | — | | 90 | 0 |
| Arsenal | 2010–11 | Premier League | 1 | 0 | 0 | 0 | 0 | 0 | 0 | 0 | — | | 1 | 0 |
| Career total | | | 621 | 2 | 41 | 0 | 6 | 0 | 116 | 0 | 3 | 0 | 787 | 2 |

=== International ===
Appearances and goals by national team and year
| National team | Year | Apps | Goals |
|---|---|---|---|
| Germany | 1998 | 2 | 0 |
| Germany | 1999 | 8 | 0 |
| Germany | 2000 | 2 | 0 |
| Germany | 2001 | 1 | 0 |
| Germany | 2002 | 3 | 0 |
| Germany | 2003 | 0 | 0 |
| Germany | 2004 | 5 | 0 |
| Germany | 2005 | 7 | 0 |
| Germany | 2006 | 14 | 0 |
| Germany | 2007 | 9 | 0 |
| Germany | 2008 | 10 | 0 |
| Total | | 61 | 0 |

== Honours ==
Schalke 04

- UEFA Cup: 1996–97
- 2. Bundesliga: 1990–91

AC Milan

- Serie A: 1998–99

Borussia Dortmund

- Bundesliga: 2001–02
- UEFA Cup runner-up: 2001–02

Arsenal

- Premier League: 2003–04
- FA Cup: 2004–05
- FA Community Shield: 2004
- UEFA Champions League runner-up: 2005–06

Germany

- FIFA World Cup runner-up: 2002; third place: 2006
- UEFA European Championship runner-up: 2008
- FIFA Confederations Cup third place: 2005

Individual

- kicker Bundesliga Team of the Season: 1995–96
- UEFA Goalkeeper of the Year: 1997, 2006
- UEFA Club Football Awards Best Goalkeeper: 2005–06
- Arsenal Player of the Season: 2005−06
- FIFA World Cup All-Star Team: 2006
- Most clean sheets in the Premier League: 2003–04

Orders

- Silbernes Lorbeerblatt: 2002, 2006
