= SpVg Aurich =

- Full name: Sportvereinigung Aurich von 1911 e.V.
- Founded: 1911
- League: Bezirksliga Weser-Ems 1 (VII)
- 2015–16: 3rd
Home colours	Away colours

SpVg Aurich is a German football club from the city of Aurich, Lower Saxony.

== History ==
The club was founded on 14 July 1911 as the descendant of the city's first football club, Fußballvereinigung Aurich, established in 1909. In 1938, the club was merged with Mannerturnverein 1862 Aurich to create Turn- und Sport Aurich von 1862. The union lasted until 13 May 1951 when the two clubs went their separate ways.

Playing as TuS Aurich the club was part of the Gauliga Oldenburg-Friesland (I) in 1943–44 where they finished their campaign in fifth place. The club played just three matches in the war-shortened 1944–45 season.

After the breakup of TuS in 1951, SpVg advanced to the Oberliga Niedersachsen/Bremen in 1994 where earned a series of lower table finishes over the course of three seasons. The club was relegated after a 14th-place result in 1996–97. By the early to middle 2000s SpVg played in Landesliga (V) and the Bezirksliga (VI) until a 2007 championship there put it back in the Landesliga, which became sixth tier the next year. By 2012 it reached the Kreisliga Aurich/Wittmund (VIII) after two consecutive relegation places two seasons before, but went back to the Bezirksliga Wesewr Ems by winning its district championship.
