= Oliver Kahn =

German footballer (born 1969)

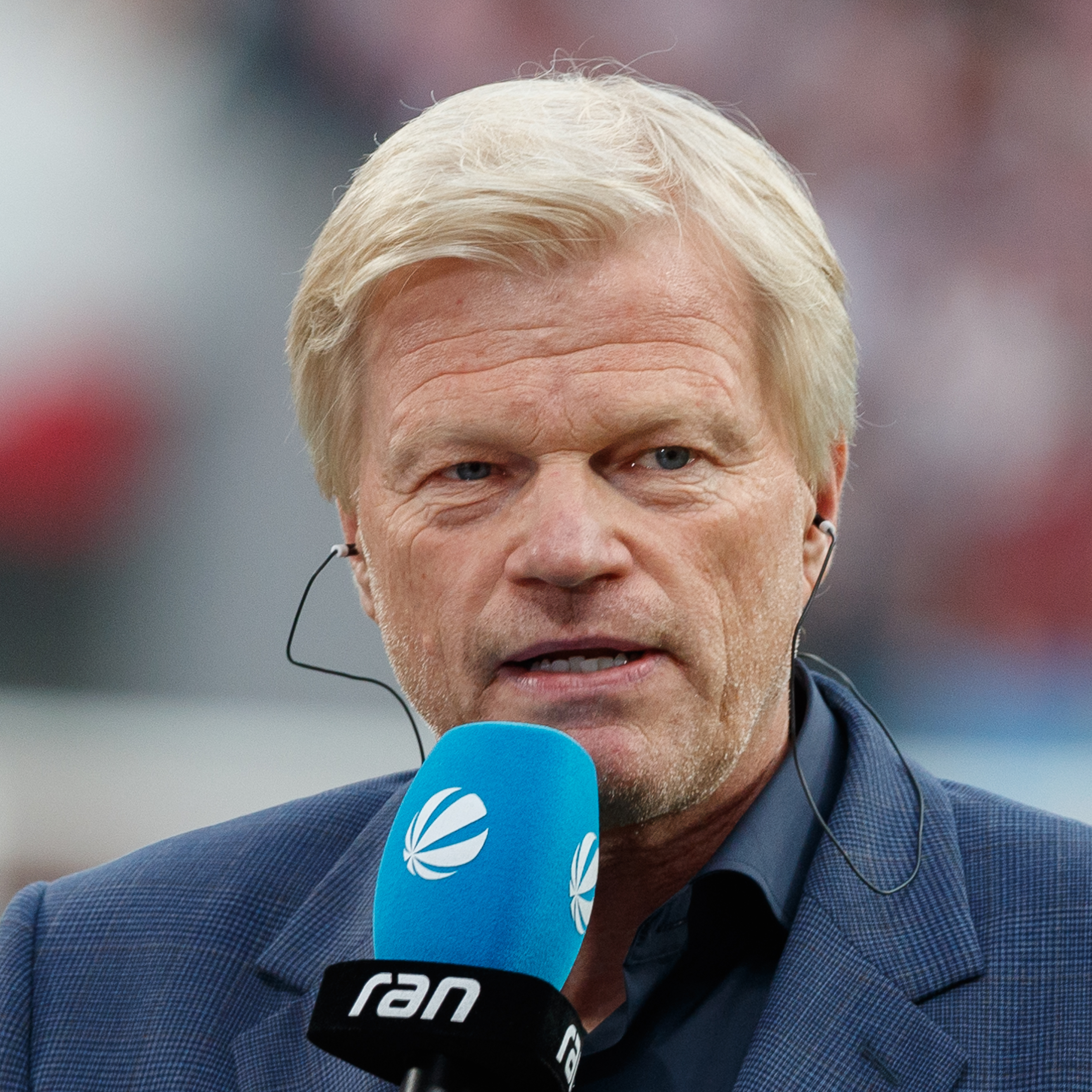
- Kahn in 2022

Personal information
- Full name: Oliver Rolf Kahn
- Date of birth: 15 June 1969 (age 57)
- Place of birth: Karlsruhe, West Germany
- Height: 1.88 m (6 ft 2 in)
- Position: Goalkeeper

Youth career
- 1975–1987: Karlsruher SC

Senior career*
Years	Team	Apps	(Gls)
1987–1990	Karlsruher SC II	73	(0)
1987–1994	Karlsruher SC	128	(0)
1994–2008	Bayern Munich	429	(0)
Total		630	(0)

International career
1995–2006	Germany	86	(0)
Medal record
Men's football
Representing Germany
UEFA European Championship
Winner	1996 England
FIFA World Cup
Runner-up	2002 Korea/Japan
Third place	2006 Germany
FIFA Confederations Cup
Third place	2005 Germany
- * Club domestic league appearances and goals

Oliver Rolf Kahn (German: [ˈɔlivɐ ˈkaːn]; born 15 June 1969) is a German football executive and former professional player who played as a goalkeeper. He started his career in the Karlsruher SC Junior team in 1975. Twelve years later, in 1987, Kahn made his debut match in the professional squad. In 1994, he was transferred to Bayern Munich for the fee of DM 4.6 million, where he played until the end of his career in 2008. His commanding presence in goal and aggressive style earned him nicknames such as Der Titan ([deːɐ̯ tiˈtaːn], "The Titan") from the press and Vul-kahn ("volcano") from fans.

Kahn is one of the most successful German players in recent history, having won eight Bundesliga titles, six DFB-Pokals, the UEFA Cup in 1996, the UEFA Champions League and the Intercontinental Cup, both achieved in 2001. Regarded as one of the greatest goalkeepers of all time, his individual contributions have earned him a record four consecutive UEFA Best European Goalkeeper awards, as well as three IFFHS World's Best Goalkeeper awards, and two German Footballer of the Year trophies. At the 2002 FIFA World Cup, Kahn became the only goalkeeper in the tournament's history to win the Golden Ball. Kahn placed fifth in both the IFFHS Best Goalkeeper of the 21st Century and Best Goalkeeper of the Past 25 Years elections.

From 1994 to 2006, Kahn was in the Germany national team, in which he played as a starter after the retirement of Andreas Köpke, he was an unused member of the squad that won the 1996 UEFA European Championship. In the 2002 FIFA World Cup, although Germany were not among the tournament favourites, Kahn's prowess, despite being injured, in goal was key to reaching the final, where Germany lost 0–2 to Brazil. Kahn made a mistake on Brazil's first goal; nonetheless, he received the Golden Ball as player of the tournament.

From July 2021 to May 2023, he was the CEO of Bayern Munich.

== Club career ==
=== Karlsruher SC ===
At the age of six, Kahn joined Karlsruher SC, where his father Rolf had played from 1962 to 1965. He started as a field player before becoming goalkeeper. Kahn was included in the team's professional squad in the 1987–88 season of the first Bundesliga division, at first being the reserve goalkeeper behind Alexander Famulla. On 27 November 1987, Kahn made his league debut in a 4–0 away defeat to 1. FC Köln. However, not until 1990 did manager Winfried Schäfer decide to start him over Famulla. In the following years, Kahn established himself as the team's starting goalkeeper. He was considered a key player and a motivator in the Karlsruher SC squad which reached the semi-finals in the 1993–94 UEFA Cup. During the round of sixteen the team accomplished a 7–0 rout of Valencia at its home field after losing the first match 1–3 at the Mestalla Stadium. The game was nicknamed the "Miracle at Wildparkstadion" by the German media. The team was defeated by SV Austria Salzburg in the semi-final.

=== Bayern Munich ===
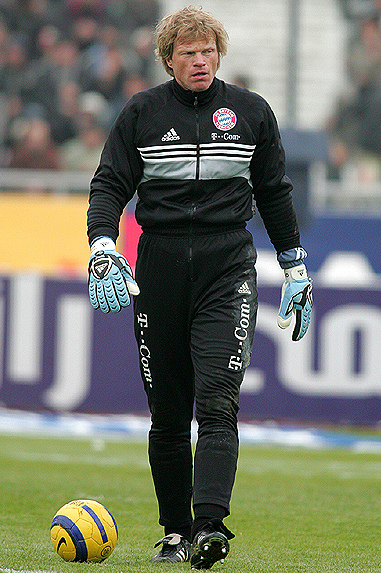
Kahn in 2006

Kahn's performance for Karlsruher SC prompted Bayern Munich to express interest in acquiring him. The team signed him as a replacement for Raimond Aumann at the beginning of the 1994–95 season, for the at that time record fee of DM4.6 million (€2.385 million) for his position, and was established as Bayern's starting goalkeeper. Although suffering a rupture of his cruciate ligament, which kept him off the field for almost six months, Kahn made his debut match for the Germany national team two months after his return. Bayern defeated Bordeaux 3–1 in the 1996 UEFA Cup Final. In the 1996–97 Bundesliga season, Kahn achieved his first German championship with Bayern Munich, the German League Cup, and was named German Goalkeeper of the Year for the second time in his career (the first in 1994).

In 1999, Bayern Munich reached the 1999 Champions League Final, facing Manchester United at Camp Nou. Although Bayern Munich player Mario Basler scored an early goal in the sixth minute of the game, two goals by Teddy Sheringham and Ole Gunnar Solskjær in injury time led to United's victory. The same year, he was named World Goalkeeper of the Year by the International Federation of Football History and Statistics.

Kahn was sent off in an incident against Hansa Rostock on 3 March 2001. With his Bayern Munich team losing 2–3 in the final minutes, he sneaked into the area during a corner kick, jumped up, and punched the ball into the opponent's net. He immediately received a red card, which dismissed him from the game. Later, he joked, "I thought the goalkeeper was allowed to use his hands in the box." Kahn played an important role in the team that won the 2000–01 UEFA Champions League. In the final against Valencia, Kahn won man of the match after saving three penalties in the penalty shoot-out. He also received the UEFA Fair Play Award for this match, after he walked up to a disappointed Santiago Cañizares, the opposition goalkeeper, after the penalty shoot-out and attempted to comfort him. The same year, Bayern Munich won the Intercontinental Cup at Tokyo's National Stadium against the Argentine team Boca Juniors.

By Kahn's account, injuries, personal problems and a lack of motivation were responsible for his game going into a rapid decline during the 2002–03 season. This culminated with Kahn allowing a seemingly soft shot by Roberto Carlos into the net against Real Madrid in the first knockout-round of the 2003–04 Champions League season, contributing to the elimination of his team from the competition. Bayern Munich won the next Bundesliga season with Kahn.

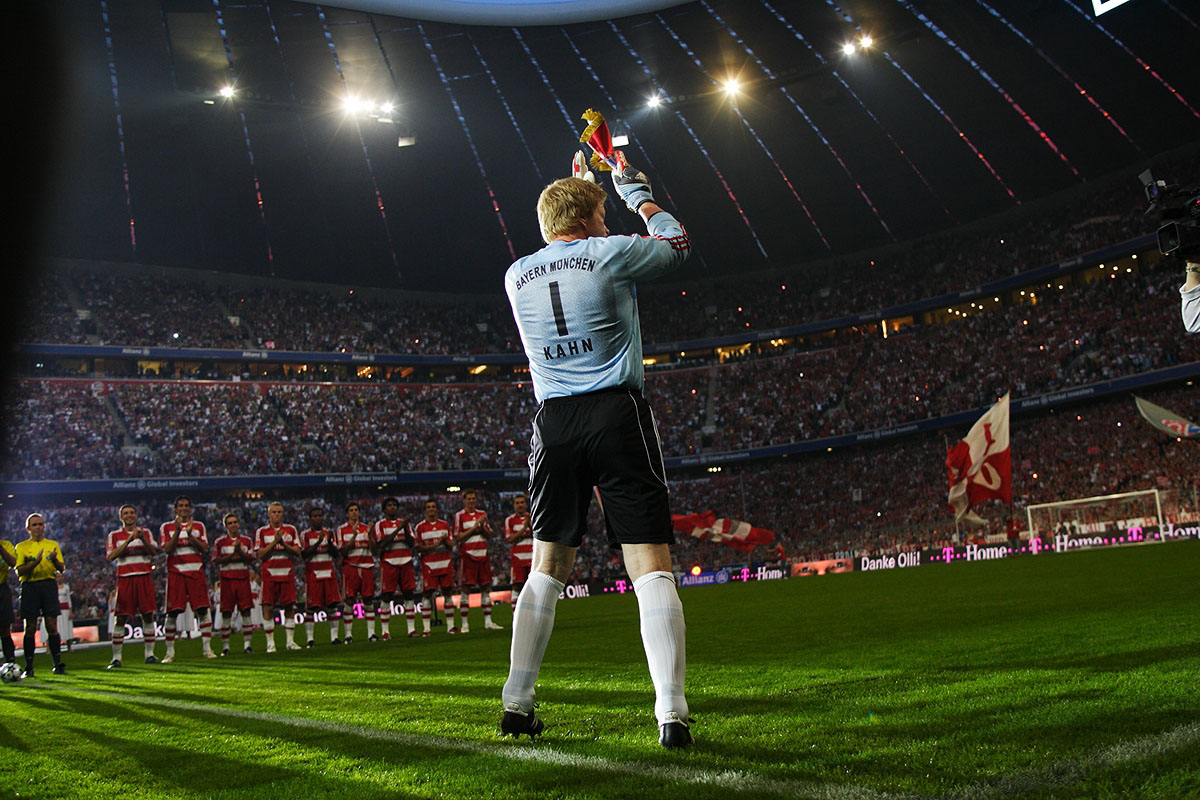
Kahn at his Bayern testimonial match in September 2008 for his 14 years of service to the club

Prior to a 2006 match against Arminia Bielefeld in Munich, Michael Rensing peppered Kahn with practice shots. One shot hit Kahn squarely in the eye, causing enough swelling and discoloration to keep him from playing. With Rensing in goal, Bayern Munich won the match 2–0.

Kahn announced his intention to honour his contract and play through the 2007–08 season. As of 2023, he has the second-most all-time clean sheets in the history of the Bundesliga with 204, only behind Manuel Neuer. On 2 September 2007, aged 38, he played his 535th Bundesliga match, becoming the league's all-time leader among goalkeepers in matches played. Kahn made his final European appearance for Bayern in a 4–0 defeat to Zenit Saint Petersburg in the UEFA Cup semi-final on 1 May 2008. His last Bundesliga game was the 4–1 victory against Hertha Berlin on 17 May. It was his 557th appearance in the German top-flight.

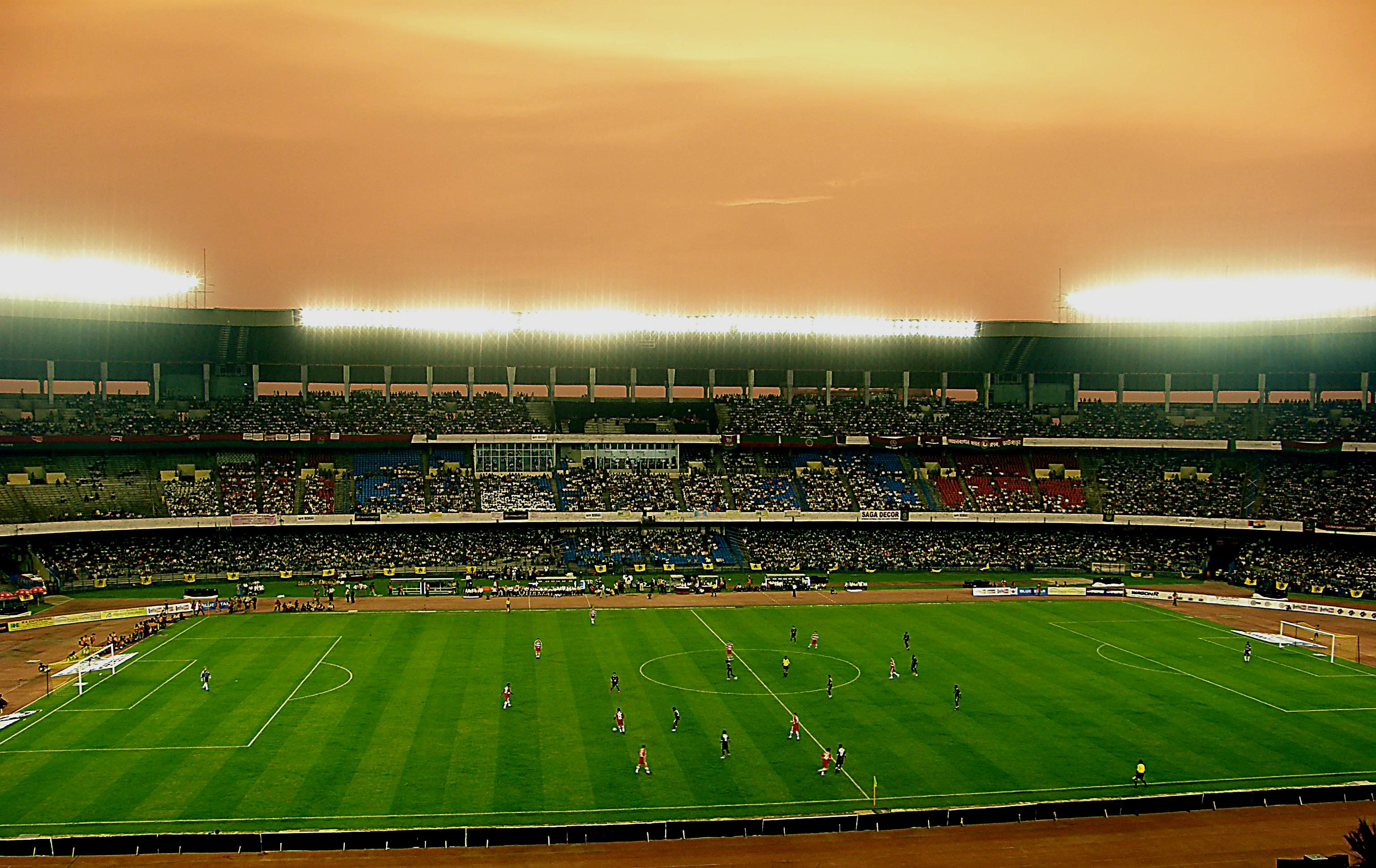
Kahn's farewell match between Bayern Munich and Mohun Bagan at the Salt Lake Stadium in Kolkata, 27 May 2008

After a 20-year career, of which he played 14 with Bayern, he had his professional farewell in a testimonial match versus the select Germany XI on 2 September 2008, which ended 1–1. His last appearance for Bayern Munich was on 27 May 2008 at the Salt Lake Stadium (Yuba Bharati Krirangan), Kolkata, in a friendly against Mohun Bagan of India during Bayern's Asian tour of 2008. Around 120,000 people turned up for the match. The match ended 0–3 in favour of Bayern and Michael Rensing substituted him in the 55th minute.

== International career ==
Kahn was initially called for the Germany national team as a late back-up for the 1994 FIFA World Cup, as third keeper behind veteran starter Bodo Illgner and Andreas Köpke; however he made his first international appearance on 23 June 1995 in a 2–1 victory against Switzerland, two months after recovering from his cruciate ligament injury. Along with Oliver Reck, Kahn was a reserve keeper of the squad, which won the 1996 UEFA European Championship in England, as the back-up to the now starting keeper Köpke.

Oliver Kahn was recently asked if there was anyone who could tell him what to do. 'Who can?' he mused. 'The only thing which engages me is what I can do to be successful.' In other words, nobody can tell Bayern Munich's goalkeeper Oliver Kahn what to do. He is, and always has been, alone with his obsession to become the master of his chosen art.

— Amy Lawrence of The Guardian on Kahn's mentality, 30 June 2002.

Kahn spent the 1998 FIFA World Cup in France on the bench, and it was not until Köpke announced his retirement at the end of the tournament that Kahn became the starting goalkeeper. Two years after UEFA Euro 2000, in which defending champions Germany made an embarrassing exit in the group stage, Kahn received the squad's captaincy, succeeding the striker Oliver Bierhoff.

Kahn experienced one of his worst performances in his international career against England in Munich in 2001. Germany were favoured to win as they had beaten England 1–0 in 2000 at the Wembley Stadium. However, they were routed 5–1, including a hat-trick by Michael Owen. Despite the defeat, Germany qualified for the World Cup after winning a playoff against Ukraine, and Kahn remained as Germany's number one for the upcoming Cup. Kahn was named the best goalkeeper in the world by IFFHS for the second time in his career.

Despite Germany's comparatively low expectations when for the 2002 FIFA World Cup, the team advanced to the final; Kahn conceded only three goals in the course of the competition, two of which were in the final. Playing the final match with torn ligaments in his right ring finger, Kahn conceded the first goal by fumbling a rebounded shot from Rivaldo to the feet of striker Ronaldo in the 67th minute. Once the game was over with Brazil as the new champion, he stood alone and disappointed in his goal; nevertheless he refused to blame his injury for his mistake. The FIFA Technical Study Group awarded him with the Lev Yashin Award for the best goalkeeper of the tournament, while also edging out tournament top scorer Ronaldo to receive the Golden Ball for the best individual performance. Kahn is the only goalkeeper in World Cup history to win the Golden Ball, and also became the first German goalkeeper to keep five clean sheets in a World Cup tournament.

"There is no consolation [...] it was the only mistake I made in seven games and it was brutally punished".

— Oliver Kahn's statements after the final of the 2002 World Cup.

Kahn maintained his number one spot for UEFA Euro 2004, but Germany were once again eliminated in the group stage. Oliver Kahn gave up his captaincy to Michael Ballack after the tournament.

Germany's new manager Jürgen Klinsmann, who replaced Rudi Völler, adopted the strategy of rotating the number one spot between Kahn and his longtime competitor, Jens Lehmann of Arsenal, to stimulate competition between the two. On 7 April 2006, after two years of dispute for the position Klinsmann announced Lehmann was his first-choice goalkeeper for the 2006 World Cup. Kahn decided to stay on as a backup for the competition; despite their acrimonious pre-tournament battle for Germany's starting role, Kahn openly accepted Klinsmann's decision. Kahn and Lehmann embraced and shook hands as the former offered words of encouragement before the quarter-final penalty shoot-out against Argentina. In the postgame conference, Kahn publicly praised Lehmann for his two decisive penalty saves.

After Germany was eliminated in the semi-finals by eventual champions Italy, Kahn was given the start for the third place play-off held on 8 July 2006, which Germany won 3–1 against Portugal. In what was his last international appearance for Germany, he also received the captaincy of the team in the absence of the injured Michael Ballack. Although overshadowed by Bastian Schweinsteiger's game-winning performance in the match, Kahn played to a high standard, pulling off several saves. Kahn deflected a shot by Portuguese forward Pauleta after he beat the German defence, and later saved Deco's shot made from just inside the penalty area. Following the match, Oliver Kahn announced his retirement from the Germany national team. Throughout his international career he earned 86 caps for Germany, including 49 as team captain. He never won a World Cup, but finished as runner-up in 2002 and third in 2006.

== Media ==
Due to his performances during the 2002 FIFA World Cup in Japan and South Korea, Kahn gained popularity in Asia. He was depicted in several television commercials, including one for the Shinkin bank. In 2008, his wax figure in the Berlin branch of the Madame Tussaud museum was inaugurated. Kahn is the subject of the song Olli Kahn by the German pop group Die Prinzen.

In 2015, the arcade game company Konami announced that Kahn would feature in their football video game Pro Evolution Soccer 2016 as one of the new myClub Legends.

=== Television career ===
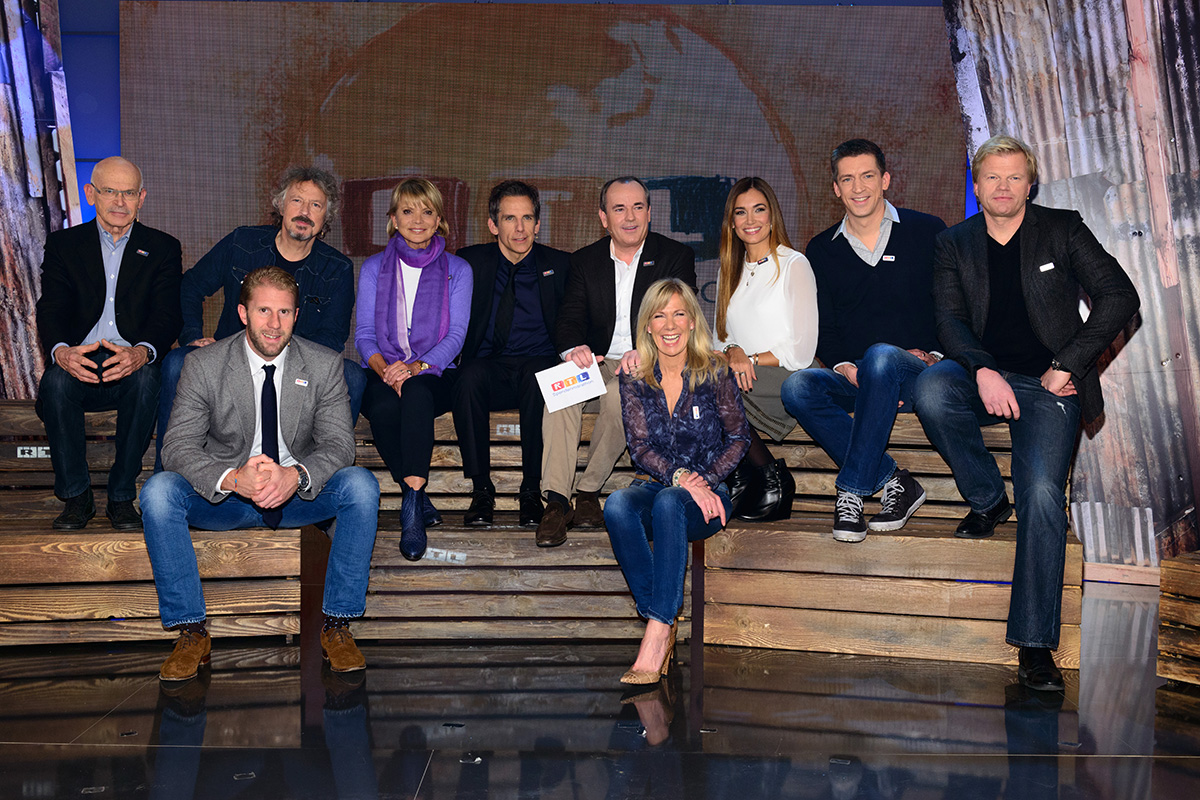
Kahn (far right) on RTL's Spendenmarathon in 2014

After the 2008 UEFA European Football Championship, he joined the ZDF sports team as an analyst for the Germany national team's games. In 2009, he was part of the jury of a China Central Television reality show, which aimed to find China's best young goalkeeper. As of 2011, he started negotiations with television channel Sat.1 to introduce the same format to German television under the name Never give up – The Kahn Principle, in which the winner would receive a contract to play for a Bundesliga club.

== Bayern Munich management ==
On 30 August 2019, it was revealed that Kahn would join the executive board of FC Bayern Munich on 1 January 2020. On 1 June 2021, it was announced that Kahn would take over the CEO position at Bayern Munich starting 1 July 2021, succeeding retiring Karl-Heinz Rummenigge.

On 27 May 2023, the day that the club secured the 2022–23 championship title, Bayern fired Kahn along with sporting director Hasan Salihamidzic, with Jan-Christian Dreesen taking over as CEO. The firings, which were rushed without waiting for the customary post-season meeting of the club's advisory board that would "review the season," were reportedly due to this having been Bayern's "least convincing Bundesliga title in eleven years."

== Personal life ==
Kahn was born in Karlsruhe. He is partly of Latvian descent; his father Rolf was born in Liepāja in 1943, where he remains well-known, to a Latvian mother, Ērika Alksne, and a Baltic German father, also named Rolf. Rolf briefly played professionally for Karlsruher SC, as did his son Axel, Oliver Kahn's older brother.

In 2009, he was offered the position of manager for the FC Schalke 04, which he turned down. Two years thereafter, in April 2011, a German court fined Kahn €125,000 ($182,223) for tax evasion after failing to declare more than €6,000 of luxury clothing he bought on a trip to Dubai.

He supports the Munich street-football league Bunt kickt gut, which is considered a pioneer project of organised street-football and a Germany and Europe-wide model of intercultural understanding, education values and prevention; the Sepp-Herberger foundation, which promotes football in schools, clubs, and prisons; and the Justin Rockola Association, whose goal is the protection of young people against violence, alcohol and drugs.

He received his coaching licence in 2010. After having studied business at the Privatuniversität Schloss Seeburg Kahn obtained a Master of Business Administration degree in 2012. His thesis topic was "Strategic management in Germany's professional football".

Kahn developed a strong interest in golf during his football career and continued playing it after retirement. He credited Sepp Maier with introducing him to the sport and called Tiger Woods one of the world's greatest athletes.

=== Relationships ===
In 1999, Kahn married Simone, with whom he has two children: Katharina-Maria (born 28 December 1998) and David (born 7 March 2003). The couple separated in 2003 and Kahn thereafter had a highly publicised relationship with Verena Kerth from 2003 to 2008. Kahn and Simone briefly reconciled in 2009, before divorcing the same year.

On 8 July 2011, Kahn married his girlfriend Svenja in Munich. The couple have a son, born in 2011.

== Style of play ==
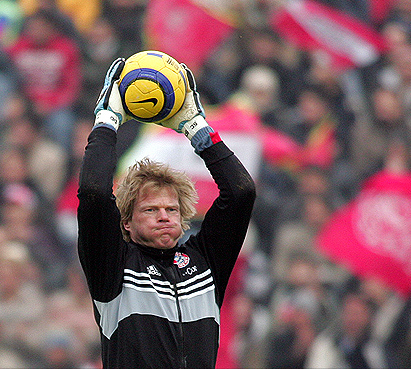
Kahn training with Bayern in 2006

Regarded as one of the greatest and most successful goalkeepers of all time, in addition to his goalkeeping technique, agility, reflexes, distribution, command of his area, and shot-stopping abilities, Kahn is widely admired for the stamina, mental strength, and composure he showed to overcome the stresses and pressures of his career. His profile on the Bayern Munich website lists his attributes as "impatient, disciplined, ambitious".

Kahn was known for his eccentricity and charismatic leadership from the back, which often saw him call out his defenders whenever they made errors. Due to the formidable presence, commanding influence, and aggressive playing style that he showed in goal during his professional career, Kahn's epithet is "The Titan"; he was also frequently nicknamed "King Kahn" throughout his career.

== Career statistics ==
=== Club ===
Appearances and goals by club, season and competition
Club	Season	League			DFB-Pokal		DFL-Ligapokal		Europe		Other		Total	
Club	Season	Division	Apps	Goals	Apps	Goals	Apps	Goals	Apps	Goals	Apps	Goals	Apps	Goals
Karlsruher SC	1987–88	Bundesliga	2	0	0	0	—		—		—		2	0
Karlsruher SC	1988–89	Bundesliga	2	0	0	0	—		—		—		2	0
Karlsruher SC	1989–90	Bundesliga	0	0	0	0	—		—		—		0	0
Karlsruher SC	1990–91	Bundesliga	22	0	0	0	—		—		—		22	0
Karlsruher SC	1991–92	Bundesliga	37	0	2	0	—		—		—		39	0
Karlsruher SC	1992–93	Bundesliga	34	0	5	0	—		—		—		39	0
Karlsruher SC	1993–94	Bundesliga	31	0	3	0	—		10 (Note: Appearances in UEFA Cup)	0	—		44	0
Karlsruher SC	Total		128	0	10	0	—		10	0	—		148	0
Bayern Munich	1994–95	Bundesliga	23	0	1	0	—		5 (Note: Appearances in UEFA Champions League)	0	1 (Note: Appearance in DFB-Supercup)	0	30	0
Bayern Munich	1995–96	Bundesliga	32	0	2	0	—		12	0	—		46	0
Bayern Munich	1996–97	Bundesliga	32	0	4	0	—		2	0	—		38	0
Bayern Munich	1997–98	Bundesliga	34	0	6	0	2	0	8	0	—		50	0
Bayern Munich	1998–99	Bundesliga	30	0	6	0	2	0	13	0	—		51	0
Bayern Munich	1999–2000	Bundesliga	27	0	5	0	0	0	13	0	—		45	0
Bayern Munich	2000–01	Bundesliga	32	0	2	0	2	0	16	0	—		52	0
Bayern Munich	2001–02	Bundesliga	32	0	4	0	1	0	12	0	2 (Note: One appearance in UEFA Super Cup, one appearance in Intercontinental Cup)	0	51	0
Bayern Munich	2002–03	Bundesliga	33	0	6	0	0	0	6	0	—		45	0
Bayern Munich	2003–04	Bundesliga	33	0	4	0	1	0	8	0	—		46	0
Bayern Munich	2004–05	Bundesliga	32	0	5	0	2	0	10	0	—		49	0
Bayern Munich	2005–06	Bundesliga	31	0	6	0	0	0	7	0	—		44	0
Bayern Munich	2006–07	Bundesliga	32	0	1	0	1	0	9	0	—		43	0
Bayern Munich	2007–08	Bundesliga	26	0	5	0	2	0	9	0	—		42	0
Bayern Munich	Total		429	0	57	0	13	0	130	0	3	0	632	0
Career total			557	0	67	0	13	0	140	0	3	0	780	0

=== International ===
Appearances and goals by national team and year
National team	Year	Apps	Goals
Germany	1995	2	0
Germany	1996	3	0
Germany	1997	3	0
Germany	1998	7	0
Germany	1999	6	0
Germany	2000	10	0
Germany	2001	10	0
Germany	2002	15	0
Germany	2003	9	0
Germany	2004	11	0
Germany	2005	7	0
Germany	2006	3	0
Total		86	0

== Honours ==
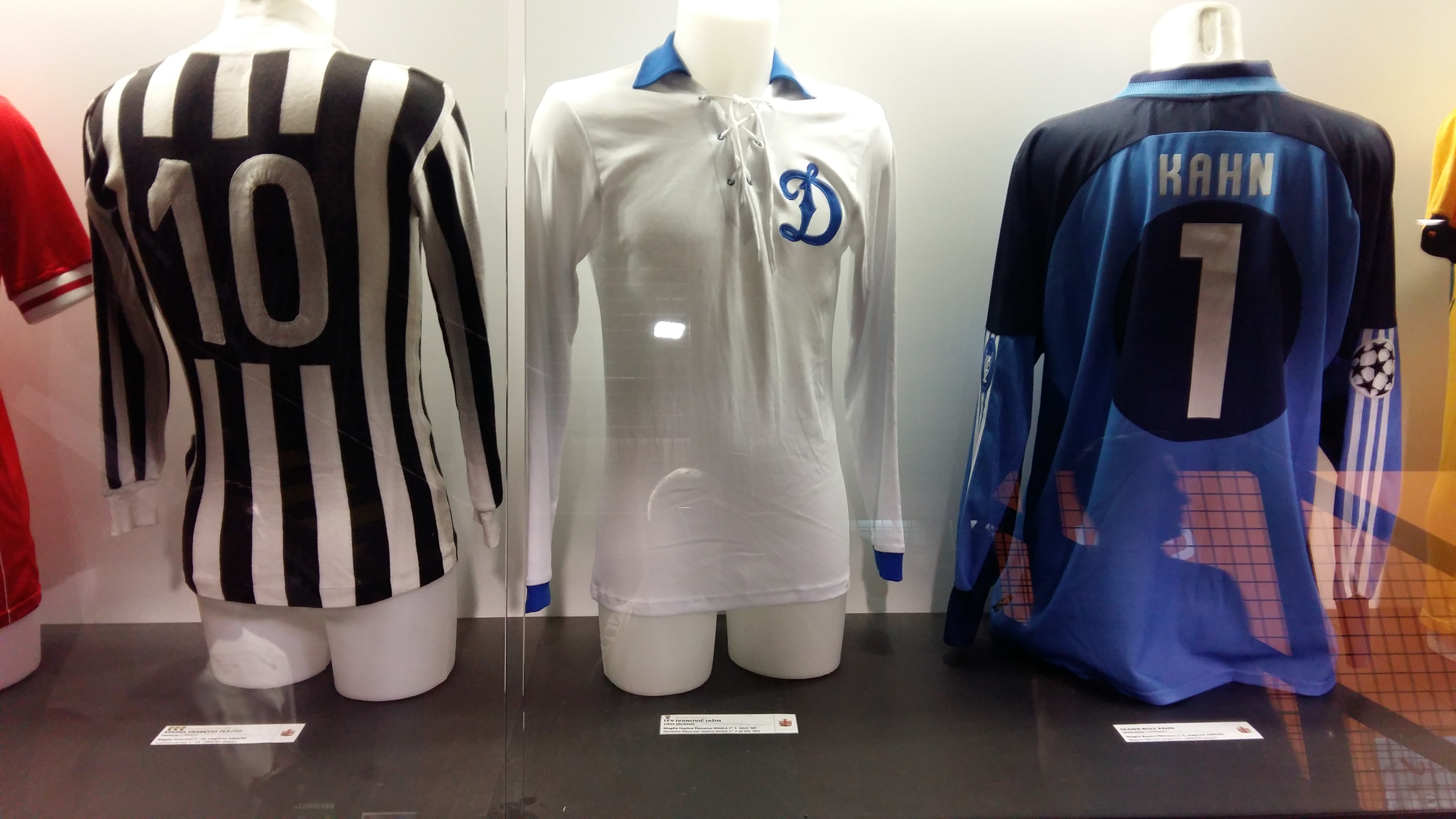
Kahn's Bayern Munich jersey next to Lev Yashin's Dynamo Moscow and Michel Platini's Juventus jerseys in the San Siro museum

Karlsruher SC II

- Oberliga Baden-Württemberg: 1989–90
- Verbandsliga Nordbaden: 1988–89

Bayern Munich

- Bundesliga: 1996–97, 1998–99, 1999–2000, 2000–01, 2002–03, 2004–05, 2005–06, 2007–08
- DFB-Pokal: 1997–98, 1999–2000, 2002–03, 2004–05, 2005–06, 2007–08
- DFB-Ligapokal: 1997, 1998, 2000, 2004, 2007
- UEFA Champions League: 2000–01, runner-up: 1998–99
- UEFA Cup: 1995–96
- Intercontinental Cup: 2001

Germany

- UEFA European Championship: 1996
- FIFA World Cup: runner-up: 2002; third place: 2006
- FIFA Confederations Cup: third place: 2005

Individual

- Best Bundesliga Keeper: 1994, 1997, 1998, 1999, 2000, 2001, 2002
- kicker Bundesliga Team of the Season: 1996–97, 2001–02
- IFFHS World's Best Goalkeeper: 1999, 2001, 2002
- Best European Goalkeeper: 1999, 2000, 2001, 2002
- UEFA Club Goalkeeper of the Year: 1999, 2000, 2001, 2002
- ESM Team of the Year: 1999–2000, 2000–01
- UEFA Champions League Final Man of the Match: 2001
- German Footballer of the Year: 2000, 2001
- Ballon d'Or third place: 2001, 2002
- UEFA Fair-Play Award: 2001
- FIFA World Cup Golden Ball: 2002
- FIFA World Cup Yashin Award: 2002
- FIFA World Cup All-Star Team: 2002
- FIFA World Player of the Year silver award: 2002
- FIFA 100
- Golden Foot: 2017, as football legend

Orders

- Silbernes Lorbeerblatt: 2002, 2006

== See also ==
- List of footballers with 100 or more UEFA Champions League appearances

Sporting positions
Preceded by Oliver Bierhoff	Germany captain 2001–2004	Succeeded by Michael Ballack
Preceded by Stefan Effenberg	Bayern Munich captain 2002–2008	Succeeded by Mark van Bommel
