= Pero Škorić =

Serbian footballer

Petar "Pero" Škorić
Personal information
- Full name: Petar Škorić
- Date of birth: 18 June 1969 (age 57)
- Place of birth: Novi Sad, SFR Yugoslavia
- Height: 1.85 m (6 ft 1 in)
- Position: Defender

Youth career
- FK Vojvodina

Senior career*
Years	Team	Apps	(Gls)
1985–1988	Vojvodina	4	(0)
1988–1989	Spartak Subotica	15	(0)
1989–1991	Vojvodina	26	
1992–1993	SC 08 Bamberg	27	(4)
1993–1994	Karlsruher SC		
1994–1995	SpVgg Bayreuth	41	(5)
1996-1997	SCW Weismain	60	(7)
1997–1998	SV Darmstadt 98	49	(0)
1998–2002	1. FC Schweinfurt 05	120	(2)
2002–2003	TSV Gerbrunn	23	(0)
2004	1. FC Schweinfurt 05	15	(0)
2005	1. FC Haßfurt	0	(0)
2005–2007	1. FC Schweinfurt 05	1	(0)
2007–2008	1. FC Schweinfurt 05 II		
2008–20??	VfL Euerbach		

International career
1987	Yugoslavia U-20		
Medal record
Representing Yugoslavia
Gold medal – first place	FIFA U-20 World Cup	1987
- * Club domestic league appearances and goals

Petar "Pero" Škorić (Serbian Cyrillic: Петар "Перо" Шкорић; born 18 June 1969) is a Serbian retired footballer. He was a member of the Yugoslavia under-20 team that won the 1987 FIFA World Youth Championship.
