= Ralph Bany =

German footballer

Personal information
- Date of birth: 1 September 1964 (age 62)
- Place of birth: West Germany
- Height: 1.85 m (6 ft 1 in)
- Position: Defender

Youth career
- Stuttgarter Kickers

Senior career*
Years	Team	Apps	(Gls)
- SV Rot
1986–1988	VfL Kirchheim/Teck	62	(1)
1988–1989	1. FC Pforzheim	30	(2)
1989–1993	Karlsruher SC	56	(0)
1993–1994	TSF Ditzingen	20	(0)
1994–1996	VfL Kirchheim/Teck		
1996–1999	Bahlinger SC	66	(3)
2000–2002	ASV Durlach		
- * Club domestic league appearances and goals

Ralph Bany (born 1 September 1964) is a former German footballer.

Bany came to German Oberliga club 1. FC Pforzheim after playing for the clubs SV Rot and VfL Kirchheim/Teck. In 1989, he changed for a transfer fee of 50,000 German Mark together with his Pforzheim colleague Eberhard Carl to the Bundesliga club Karlsruher SC. In his first term he already played 26 times. He lost his defense position within the second half of the season 1990–91 which led to only five assignments in two terms altogether. In 1993, he left the Karlsruher SC and changed to the Oberliga club TSF Ditzingen. He continued his career in the German Football Oberliga Baden-Württemberg at Kirchheim/Teck and Bahlinger SC as well as in the German Verbandsliga Baden at ASV Durlach.
