= Bougoutoub-Bany =

Coordinates: 12.9015°N 16.0938°W

- Interactive map of Bougoutoub-Bany
- Country: Senegal
- Time zone: UTC+0 (GMT)

Bougoutoub-Bany is a settlement in Senegal.
