= VfL Herrenberg =

German football club

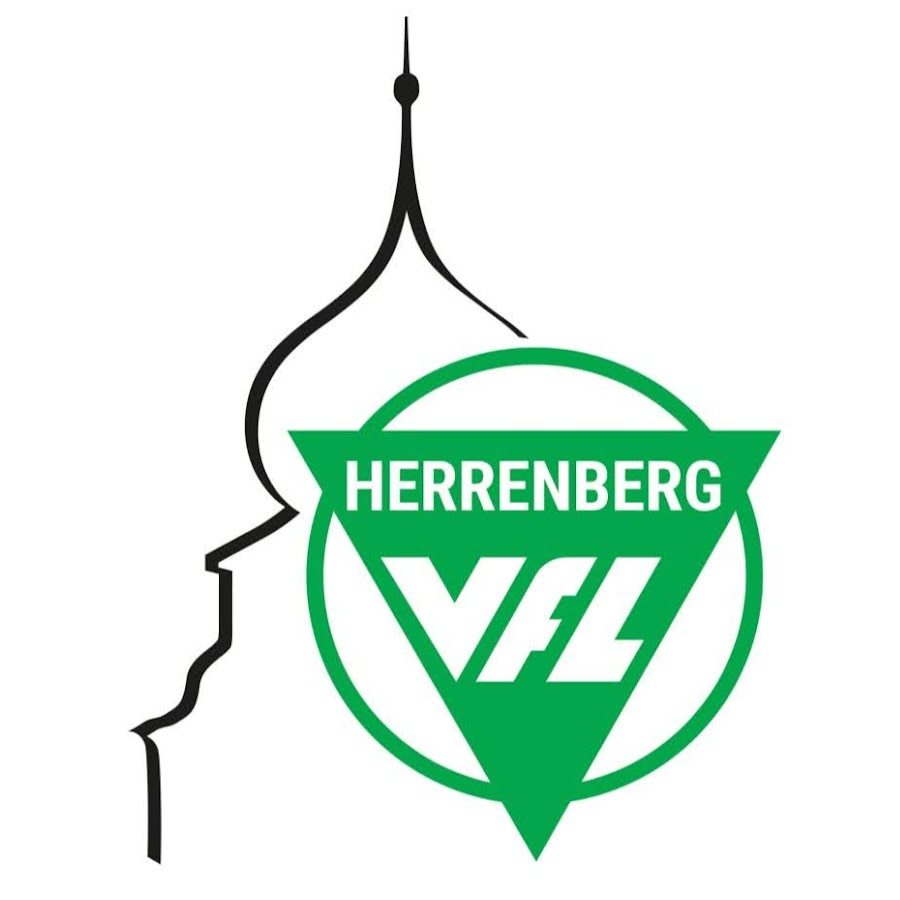
- Full name: VfL Herrenberg e.V.
- Founded: 1919
- Ground: Volksbankstadion
- Capacity: 4,000
- 1st Chairman: Werner Rilka
- Head coaches: Daniel Wahnsiedler (men); Julian Weidinger (men); Steven Riechers (women)
- League: Bezirksliga Württemberg (VIII)
- 2022–23: 4th (men's)
- Website: https://www.vfl-herrenberg.de/home/
Home colours

The VfL Herrenberg is a German association football club from the town of Herrenberg, Baden-Württemberg.

== History ==
The VfL Herrenberg was formed on 30 July 1848 as a gymnastics club. The football division of the club was established in 1919.

Their women's team gained promotion to the Regionalliga Süd in 2022. Despite winning on the final day of the season, Herrenberg were relegated in 2022–23. After a third place in 2024, Herrenberg beat 1. FC Heidenheim to the Oberliga Württemberg title by one point during the 2024–25 season.

== Squads ==
=== Women's team ===
As of 2 August 2025

Note: Flags indicate national team as defined under FIFA eligibility rules; some limited exceptions apply. Players may hold more than one non-FIFA nationality.

No.	Pos.	Nation	Player
—	GK	(Germany) GER	Judith Müßigmann
2	DF	(Germany) GER	Angelika Mlacak
4	DF	(Germany) GER	Romy Schächinger
5	DF	(Germany) GER	Pia Schmidt
6	DF	(Germany) GER	Florentine Buck
7	MF	(Germany) GER	Luise Fritz
8	DF	(Germany) GER	Marie Gleixner
9	DF	(Germany) GER	Marlies Della Latta
10	MF	(Germany) GER	Selina Walter
12	MF	(Germany) GER	Jana Lennartz
15	DF	(Germany) GER	Lea Furac
16	MF	(Germany) GER	Moesha Owens
17	DF	(Germany) GER	Christina Riechers

No.	Pos.	Nation	Player
19	FW	(Germany) GER	Maike Hillert
20	FW	(Germany) GER	Franka Ziegler
23	FW	(Germany) GER	Annika Schmidt
27	MF	(Germany) GER	Tabea Czech
32	MF	(Germany) GER	Sina Rahm
99	GK	(Germany) GER	Ann-Cathrin Maurer
—	DF	(Germany) GER	Katharina Baumann
—	DF	(Germany) GER	Nelly Buchholz
—	MF	(Germany) GER	Lucy Claar
—	MF	(Germany) GER	Jenniffer Marquart
—	MF	(Germany) GER	Maja Delišimunović
—	MF	(Germany) GER	Lisa Marie Sock
—	FW	(Germany) GER	Melanie Wirth

=== Men's team ===
As of 21 May 2024

Note: Flags indicate national team as defined under FIFA eligibility rules; some limited exceptions apply. Players may hold more than one non-FIFA nationality.

No.	Pos.	Nation	Player
2	DF	(Germany) GER	Faramosh Zakrea
4	DF	(Germany) GER	Mark Betsch
5	DF	(Germany) GER	Julian Gack
6	MF	(Germany) GER	Mika Kennke
7	MF	(Germany) GER	Tom Egeler
8	MF	(Germany) GER	Tobias Lutz (Captain)
9	MF	(Germany) GER	Steven Franguere
11	FW	(Germany) GER	Lukas Rähle
16	MF	(Germany) GER	Fynn Straub
17	FW	(Germany) GER	Marvin Kennke
18	DF	(Germany) GER	Julian Akaltun
19	DF	(Germany) GER	Daniel Atis

No.	Pos.	Nation	Player
20	DF	(Germany) GER	Mika Kirn
21	DF	(Germany) GER	Joshua Stegitz
22	FW	(Germany) GER	Alp Aktepe
23	FW	(Germany) GER	Deniz Bas
28	GK	(Germany) GER	Daniel Ulmer
30	GK	(Germany) GER	Marcel Welte
31	DF	(Germany) GER	Tim Mahmoud
33	DF	(Germany) GER	Kevin Thoms
35	MF	(Germany) GER	Emir Akkaya
38	FW	(Germany) GER	Solomon Chigozie Ezenne
47	FW	(Germany) GER	Cedric Fais
99	GK	(Germany) GER	Andreas Gusenbauer

== Honours ==
The club's honours:

=== Men's ===
==== League ====
- Landesliga 3 Württemberg (VII)
  - Champions: 1988
- Bezirksliga Böblingen-Calw (VIII)
  - Champions: 1987, 2009, 2011

=== Women's ===
==== League ====
- Oberliga Baden-Württemberg (IV)
  - Champions: 2022, 2025
- Verbandsliga Württemberg (V)
  - Champions: 2019
- Regionenliga Württemberg (VII)
  - Champions: 2009, 2011, 2017
- Bezirksliga Böblingen-Calw (VIII)
  - Champions: 2016

== Recent seasons ==
The recent season-by-season performance of the club:

=== Men's ===
Season	Division	Tier	Position
2008–09	Bezirksliga Böblingen-Calw	VIII	1st ↑
2009–10	Landesliga 3 Württemberg	VII	14th ↓
2010–11	Bezirksliga Böblingen-Calw	VIII	1st ↑
2011–12	Landesliga 3 Württemberg	VII	14th ↓
2012–13	Bezirksliga Böblingen-Calw	VIII	4th
2013–14	Bezirksliga Böblingen-Calw	VIII	6th
2014–15	Bezirksliga Böblingen-Calw	VIII	6th
2015–16	Bezirksliga Böblingen-Calw	VIII	7th
2016–17	Bezirksliga Böblingen-Calw	VIII	9th
2017–18	Bezirksliga Böblingen-Calw	VIII	2nd
2018–19	Bezirksliga Böblingen-Calw	VIII	3rd
2019–20	Bezirksliga Böblingen-Calw	VIII	8th*
2020–21	Bezirksliga Böblingen-Calw	VIII	15th*
2021–22	Bezirksliga Böblingen-Calw	VIII	10th
2022–23	Bezirksliga Böblingen-Calw	VIII	4th

*Season abandoned due to the COVID-19 pandemic.

↑ Promoted	↓ Relegated

=== Women's ===
Season	Division	Tier	Position
2008–09	Regionenliga Württemberg 3	VII	1st ↑
2009–10	Landesliga Württemberg 1	VI	10th ↓
2010–11	Regionenliga Württemberg 4	VII	1st ↑
2011–12	Landesliga Württemberg 1	VI	11th ↓
2012–13	Regionenliga Württemberg 3	VII	11th ↓
2013–14	Bezirksliga Böblingen-Calw	VIII	4th
2014–15	Bezirksliga Böblingen-Calw	VIII	3rd
2015–16	Bezirksliga Böblingen-Calw	VIII	1st ↑
2016–17	Regionenliga Württemberg 4	VII	1st ↑
2017–18	Landesliga Württemberg 2	VI	2nd ↑
2018–19	Verbandsliga Württemberg	V	1st ↑
2019–20	Oberliga Baden-Württemberg	IV	8th*
2020–21	Oberliga Baden-Württemberg	IV	11th*
2021–22	Oberliga Baden-Württemberg	IV	1st ↑
2022–23	Regionalliga Süd	III	11th ↓
2023–24	Oberliga Baden-Württemberg	IV	3rd
2024–25	Oberliga Baden-Württemberg	IV	1st ↑

*Season abandoned due to the COVID-19 pandemic.

↑ Promoted	↓ Relegated
