= Peter Sendscheid =

German footballer (born 1965)

Personal information
- Date of birth: 28 September 1965 (age 61)
- Place of birth: Herzogenrath, West Germany
- Height: 1.76 m (5 ft 9 in)
- Position: Striker

Youth career
- 1984–1985: Rhenania Richterich

Senior career*
Years	Team	Apps	(Gls)
1985–1989	Alemannia Aachen	64	(17)
1990–1994	Schalke 04	149	(46)
- * Club domestic league appearances and goals

Peter Sendscheid (born 28 September 1965) is a retired German footballer. He played as a striker for Alemannia Aachen and Schalke 04 in the Bundesliga and 2. Bundesliga.

== Career statistics ==
Club	Season	League			Cup		Total	
Club	Season	League	Apps	Goals	Apps	Goals	Apps	Goals
Alemannia Aachen	1986–87	2. Bundesliga	11	1	1	0	12	1
Alemannia Aachen	1987–88	2. Bundesliga	17	3	0	0	17	3
Alemannia Aachen	1988–89	2. Bundesliga	36	13	3	2	39	15
Alemannia Aachen	Total		64	17	4	2	68	19
Schalke 04	1989–90	2. Bundesliga	38	18	1	0	39	18
Schalke 04	1990–91	2. Bundesliga	31	10	1	0	32	10
Schalke 04	1991–92	Bundesliga	35	7	1	0	36	7
Schalke 04	1992–93	Bundesliga	23	6	1	0	24	6
Schalke 04	1993–94	Bundesliga	19	5	0	0	19	5
Schalke 04	1994–95	Bundesliga	3	0	2	0	5	0
Schalke 04	Total		149	46	6	0	155	46
Career total			213	63	10	2	223	65
