= 1988–89 2. Bundesliga =

15th season of the second-tier football league in Germany

2. Bundesliga
- Season: 1988–89
- Champions: Fortuna Düsseldorf
- Promoted: Fortuna Düsseldorf; FC Homburg
- Relegated: Kickers Offenbach; Viktoria Aschaffenburg; 1. FSV Mainz 05; Union Solingen
- Matches: 380
- Top goalscorer: Sven Demandt (35 goals)
- Average attendance: 6,065

The 1988–89 2. Bundesliga season was the fifteenth season of the 2. Bundesliga, the second tier of the German football league system.

Fortuna Düsseldorf and FC Homburg were promoted to the Bundesliga while Kickers Offenbach, Viktoria Aschaffenburg, 1. FSV Mainz 05 and Union Solingen were relegated to the Oberliga.

== League table ==
For the 1988–89 season Eintracht Braunschweig, Hertha BSC, Viktoria Aschaffenburg and 1. FSV Mainz 05 were newly promoted to the 2. Bundesliga from the Oberliga while FC Schalke 04 and FC Homburg had been relegated to the league from the Bundesliga.

Locations of the participating teams of the 1988–89 season

| Pos | Team | Pld | W | D | L | GF | GA | GD | Pts | Promotion, qualification or relegation |
|---|---|---|---|---|---|---|---|---|---|---|
| 1 | Fortuna Düsseldorf (C, P) | 38 | 19 | 11 | 8 | 85 | 52 | +33 | 49 | Promotion to Bundesliga |
| 2 | FC Homburg (P) | 38 | 18 | 11 | 9 | 55 | 36 | +19 | 47 | Promotion to Bundesliga |
| 3 | 1. FC Saarbrücken | 38 | 17 | 12 | 9 | 53 | 43 | +10 | 46 | Qualification to promotion play-offs |
| 4 | Fortuna Köln | 38 | 20 | 5 | 13 | 80 | 57 | +23 | 45 | |
| 5 | SC Freiburg | 38 | 17 | 8 | 13 | 66 | 52 | +14 | 42 | |
| 6 | SG Wattenscheid 09 | 38 | 17 | 8 | 13 | 68 | 58 | +10 | 42 | |
| 7 | Alemannia Aachen | 38 | 17 | 7 | 14 | 58 | 55 | +3 | 41 | |
| 8 | Blau-Weiß 90 Berlin | 38 | 15 | 11 | 12 | 56 | 54 | +2 | 41 | |
| 9 | Eintracht Braunschweig | 38 | 12 | 14 | 12 | 43 | 43 | 0 | 38 | |
| 10 | SV Meppen | 38 | 12 | 13 | 13 | 55 | 54 | +1 | 37 | |
| 11 | Darmstadt 98 | 38 | 16 | 5 | 17 | 56 | 57 | −1 | 37 | |
| 12 | Schalke 04 | 38 | 13 | 10 | 15 | 58 | 51 | +7 | 36 | |
| 13 | Hertha BSC | 38 | 11 | 14 | 13 | 45 | 44 | +1 | 36 | |
| 14 | VfL Osnabrück | 38 | 13 | 10 | 15 | 58 | 66 | −8 | 36 | |
| 15 | Kickers Offenbach (Note: Kickers Offenbach had their license revoked and were therefore relegated.) (R) | 38 | 14 | 7 | 17 | 51 | 53 | −2 | 35 | Relegation to Oberliga |
| 16 | Rot-Weiss Essen | 38 | 13 | 9 | 16 | 54 | 60 | −6 | 35 | |
| 17 | SpVgg Bayreuth | 38 | 12 | 10 | 16 | 52 | 60 | −8 | 34 | |
| 18 | Viktoria Aschaffenburg (R) | 38 | 12 | 10 | 16 | 47 | 60 | −13 | 34 | Relegation to Oberliga |
| 19 | Mainz 05 (R) | 38 | 8 | 13 | 17 | 44 | 76 | −32 | 29 | Relegation to Oberliga |
| 20 | SG Union Solingen (R) | 38 | 6 | 8 | 24 | 24 | 77 | −53 | 20 | Relegation to Oberliga |

Source: Bundesliga.de
Rules for classification: 1) points; 2) goal difference; 3) number of goals scored.
(C) Champions; (P) Promoted; (R) Relegated

== Results ==
| Home \ Away | AAC | SVV | BAY | BWB | BSC | EBS | D98 | F95 | RWE | SCF | HOM | FKO | M05 | SVM | KOF | OSN | FCS | S04 | SGU | SGW |
|---|---|---|---|---|---|---|---|---|---|---|---|---|---|---|---|---|---|---|---|---|
| Alemannia Aachen | — | 0–1 | 5–3 | 3–0 | 2–0 | 0–1 | 0–1 | 2–1 | 3–1 | 1–4 | 2–2 | 3–1 | 5–2 | 3–0 | 1–2 | 2–1 | 1–1 | 2–0 | 3–0 | 0–2 |
| Viktoria Aschaffenburg | 1–2 | — | 3–0 | 1–1 | 1–0 | 3–1 | 0–0 | 2–2 | 2–1 | 2–1 | 3–0 | 1–6 | 2–1 | 1–1 | 2–1 | 1–1 | 0–1 | 2–0 | 4–0 | 2–1 |
| SpVgg Bayreuth | 0–2 | 4–1 | — | 0–1 | 1–1 | 2–1 | 4–1 | 1–2 | 1–0 | 3–2 | 1–1 | 2–0 | 4–1 | 0–0 | 1–2 | 4–1 | 2–1 | 1–1 | 1–1 | 1–1 |
| Blau-Weiß 90 Berlin | 1–2 | 2–0 | 1–2 | — | 1–1 | 3–3 | 2–1 | 2–7 | 2–0 | 1–0 | 2–0 | 2–1 | 2–3 | 2–1 | 0–0 | 1–2 | 1–1 | 1–1 | 2–0 | 1–0 |
| Hertha BSC | 1–1 | 3–1 | 3–0 | 0–2 | — | 0–2 | 1–0 | 1–1 | 4–0 | 0–0 | 2–0 | 3–0 | 0–0 | 0–0 | 1–0 | 2–1 | 1–2 | 2–1 | 1–1 | 2–3 |
| Eintracht Braunschweig | 0–1 | 1–0 | 1–1 | 1–1 | 1–1 | — | 2–1 | 0–0 | 2–1 | 1–1 | 2–1 | 0–1 | 0–0 | 1–1 | 2–2 | 1–0 | 1–1 | 1–0 | 4–0 | 3–0 |
| Darmstadt 98 | 0–1 | 2–1 | 2–1 | 2–1 | 1–1 | 1–2 | — | 2–1 | 0–2 | 2–1 | 1–2 | 2–1 | 7–0 | 2–2 | 3–0 | 1–1 | 0–0 | 2–1 | 1–0 | 2–4 |
| Fortuna Düsseldorf | 1–1 | 4–0 | 4–3 | 1–1 | 2–2 | 4–0 | 1–2 | — | 2–0 | 4–0 | 4–1 | 3–1 | 2–1 | 4–1 | 2–1 | 3–2 | 2–1 | 2–0 | 1–1 | 1–1 |
| Rot-Weiss Essen | 3–1 | 0–0 | 0–0 | 3–3 | 0–0 | 2–1 | 3–1 | 1–5 | — | 3–0 | 0–3 | 3–4 | 3–0 | 2–1 | 2–0 | 2–1 | 1–1 | 2–1 | 0–1 | 3–0 |
| SC Freiburg | 3–0 | 3–1 | 4–0 | 2–4 | 1–1 | 2–0 | 2–0 | 1–3 | 5–3 | — | 1–0 | 2–1 | 1–1 | 3–1 | 3–0 | 3–0 | 2–0 | 2–1 | 1–1 | 1–1 |
| FC Homburg | 1–1 | 3–0 | 3–0 | 2–0 | 1–0 | 2–0 | 3–0 | 3–1 | 0–0 | 1–1 | — | 2–0 | 2–0 | 1–0 | 1–0 | 1–1 | 0–1 | 2–1 | 6–2 | 3–2 |
| Fortuna Köln | 4–0 | 2–0 | 3–1 | 2–1 | 1–0 | 3–2 | 3–0 | 4–1 | 3–0 | 1–1 | 2–0 | — | 3–0 | 3–1 | 3–0 | 1–3 | 2–0 | 1–2 | 2–0 | 5–6 |
| Mainz 05 | 3–1 | 3–2 | 1–0 | 0–2 | 1–1 | 1–0 | 1–2 | 2–2 | 1–1 | 2–1 | 0–0 | 2–2 | — | 1–6 | 3–1 | 1–1 | 1–1 | 2–2 | 3–0 | 1–1 |
| SV Meppen | 2–0 | 4–1 | 1–0 | 2–2 | 1–0 | 0–0 | 1–4 | 3–1 | 2–2 | 2–3 | 2–2 | 1–1 | 4–1 | — | 4–0 | 1–3 | 0–1 | 1–3 | 1–1 | 1–0 |
| Kickers Offenbach | 3–0 | 2–2 | 1–2 | 2–1 | 4–1 | 0–0 | 3–1 | 3–0 | 1–0 | 3–2 | 0–1 | 1–1 | 3–0 | 2–3 | — | 1–1 | 4–0 | 2–1 | 2–0 | 2–0 |
| VfL Osnabrück | 2–2 | 3–1 | 1–5 | 1–1 | 4–3 | 1–1 | 2–0 | 1–5 | 1–3 | 1–4 | 0–0 | 4–2 | 2–1 | 0–0 | 1–0 | — | 3–0 | 1–0 | 6–0 | 1–3 |
| 1. FC Saarbrücken | 2–0 | 0–0 | 0–0 | 2–1 | 2–1 | 2–1 | 2–1 | 2–2 | 0–2 | 2–0 | 2–1 | 4–2 | 2–2 | 4–1 | 2–2 | 2–0 | — | 2–1 | 2–0 | 0–0 |
| Schalke 04 | 2–2 | 0–0 | 4–0 | 4–1 | 0–1 | 2–0 | 3–4 | 1–1 | 1–1 | 4–2 | 0–0 | 3–3 | 4–1 | 0–0 | 2–0 | 0–2 | 2–1 | — | 3–1 | 3–2 |
| Union Solingen | 0–2 | 2–2 | 1–1 | 0–2 | 1–2 | 0–2 | 0–3 | 1–0 | 3–2 | 0–1 | 0–2 | 0–2 | 2–0 | 0–1 | 1–0 | 3–2 | 0–4 | 1–3 | — | 0–3 |
| SG Wattenscheid | 3–1 | 2–1 | 2–0 | 1–2 | 4–2 | 2–2 | 2–1 | 1–3 | 4–2 | 1–0 | 2–2 | 1–3 | 2–1 | 0–2 | 3–1 | 5–0 | 3–2 | 0–1 | 0–0 | — |

Source: DFB
Legend: Blue = home team win; Yellow = draw; Red = away team win.

== Top scorers ==
The league's top scorers:

| Goals | Player | Team |
|---|---|---|
| 35 | (Germany) Sven Demandt | Fortuna Düsseldorf |
| 22 | (Germany) Uwe Fuchs | Fortuna Köln |
| 16 | (Germany) Ralf Haub | Viktoria Aschaffenburg |
| 15 | (Germany) Uwe Tschiskale | SG Wattenscheid 09 |
| 15 | (Germany) Jörg Wolff | SpVgg Bayreuth |
| 14 | (Germany) Ingo Anderbrügge | FC Schalke 04 |
| 14 | (Germany) Henrik Eichenauer | SV Darmstadt 98 |
| 13 | (Germany) Peter Sendscheid | Alemannia Aachen |
| 12 | (Germany) Christiaan Pförtner | Fortuna Köln |
| 12 | (Germany) Martin van der Pütten | SV Meppen |
