= Burkhard Reich =

German footballer (born 1964)

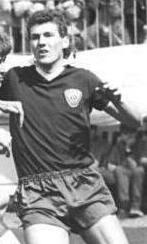
- Reich with BFC Dynamo in 1989

Personal information
- Date of birth: 1 December 1964 (age 61)
- Place of birth: Fürstenwalde, East Germany
- Height: 1.91 m (6 ft 3 in)
- Position: Central defender

Youth career
- 1974–1977: SG Dynamo Fürstenwalde
- 1977–1981: BFC Dynamo

Senior career*
Years	Team	Apps	(Gls)
1981–1986	SG Dynamo Fürstenwalde	66	(17)
1986–1989	BFC Dynamo II	10	(0)
1986–1991	BFC Dynamo / FC Berlin	102	(16)
1991–1999	Karlsruher SC	214	(15)
1999–2000	VfB Leipzig	33	(4)
Total		425	(52)

International career
1987–1990	East Germany	6	(0)
- * Club domestic league appearances and goals

Burkhard Reich (born 1 December 1964) is a German former professional footballer who played as a central defender. He is currently the athletic director for Karlsruher SC II.

Reich began to play football for SG Dynamo Fürstenwalde and joined the youth academy of BFC Dynamo at 12-years-old in 1977. He then returned to SG Dynamo Fürstenwalde when he was 17 years old. He made his professional debut for SG Dynamo Fürstenwalde in the DDR-Liga in 1981. The coach of BFC Dynamo Jürgen Bogs was so impressed by Reich after a friendly match between SG Dynamo Fürstenwalde and BFC Dynamo that he decided to bring him back to BFC Dynamo during the 1985–86 season. Reich scored his first goal in the DDR-Oberliga in the derby against 1. FC Union Berlin at the Stadion der Weltjugend on 13 September 1986. BFC Dynamo won the match 8–1.

Reich played 302 top-flight matches in (East) German football: 102 in the DDR-Oberliga and 200 in the Bundesliga.

Reich won six caps for East Germany between 1987 and 1990.

== Honours ==
- DDR-Oberliga: 1986–87, 1987–88
- FDGB-Pokal: 1987–88, 1988–89
- DFB-Pokal finalist: 1995–96
