= Lars Schmidt =

German footballer and manager

Personal information
- Date of birth: 13 September 1965 (age 61)
- Height: 1.75 m (5 ft 9 in)
- Position: Defender

Senior career*
Years	Team	Apps	(Gls)
1985–1995	Karlsruher SC	265	(5)
1995–1999	Mainz 05	99	(3)
1999–2001	Kickers Offenbach	41	(0)
Total		405	(8)

Managerial career
- 2003–2004: Kickers Offenbach
- 2005–2010: Kickers Obertshausen
- 2010–2012: TGM SV Jügesheim
- * Club domestic league appearances and goals

Lars Schmidt (born 13 September 1965) is a German former professional footballer who became a coach.
