= Rainer Schütterle =

German footballer

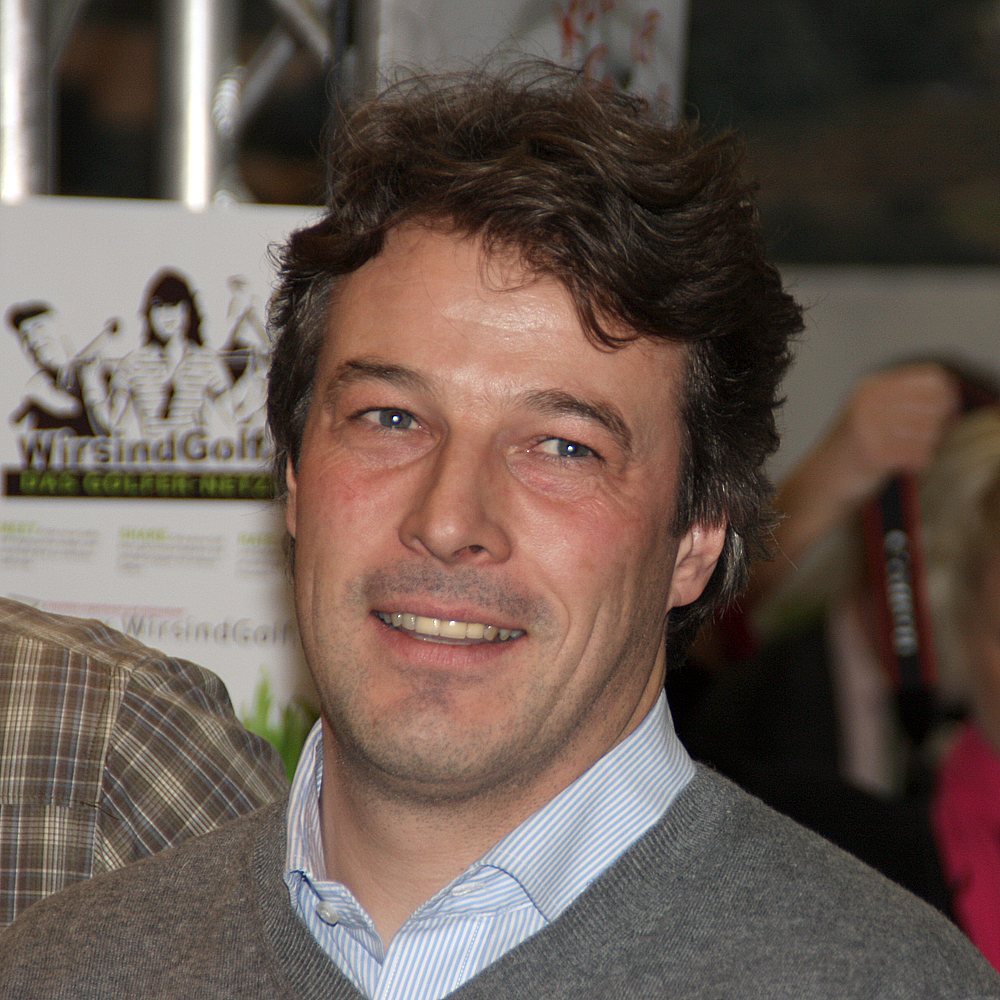
- Rainer Schütterle in 2009

Personal information
- Date of birth: March 21, 1966 (age 60)
- Place of birth: Kehl, Germany
- Height: 1.80 m (5 ft 11 in)
- Positions: Midfielder; striker

Senior career*
Years	Team	Apps	(Gls)
1985–1987	Karlsruher SC	72	(25)
1987–1989	VfB Stuttgart	57	(5)
1989–1994	Karlsruher SC	155	(35)
1994–1996	MSV Duisburg	55	(7)
1996–1997	SV Ried	32	(3)
1997–1999	Fortuna Köln	43	(6)
1999–2000	Karlsruher SC	6	(0)
Total		420	(81)

International career
1987	West Germany U-21	3	(0)
- * Club domestic league appearances and goals

Rainer Schütterle (born March 21, 1966, in Kehl) is a German former professional footballer.

== Honours ==
- UEFA Cup finalist: 1989
