= Gunther Metz =

German footballer and coach

Personal information
- Date of birth: 8 August 1967 (age 59)
- Place of birth: Alzey, West Germany
- Height: 1.74 m (5 ft 9 in)
- Position: Defender

Team information
- Current team: 1. FC Kaiserslautern; (U-19 team manager)

Youth career
- SC Hangen-Weisheim

Senior career*
Years	Team	Apps	(Gls)
1986–1987	1. FC Kaiserslautern	8	(0)
1987–1999	Karlsruher SC	286	(5)
Total		294	(5)

Managerial career
- 2003–2008: 1. FC Kaiserslautern (assistant)
- 2008–: 1. FC Kaiserslautern (U-19 team)
- * Club domestic league appearances and goals

Gunther Metz (born 8 August 1967, in Alzey) is a German football coach and a former player who is currently managing the under-19 team of 1. FC Kaiserslautern.

== Honours ==
- DFB-Pokal finalist: 1995–96
