= Günter Schlipper =

German association football player

Personal information
- Date of birth: 13 August 1962 (age 63)
- Place of birth: Oberhausen, West Germany
- Height: 1.76 m (5 ft 9 in)
- Position: Midfielder

Senior career*
Years	Team	Apps	(Gls)
1981–1983	BV Altenessen		
1983–1985	MSV Duisburg	59	(2)
1985–1986	VfB Speldorf		
1986–1988	Rot-Weiß Oberhausen	31	(5)
1988	1. FC Köln	4	(0)
1989–1993	Schalke 04	111	(15)
1993–1994	Rot-Weiß Oberhausen	10	(1)
1995–2003	Adler Osterfeld		
- * Club domestic league appearances and goals

Günter Schlipper (born 13 August 1962) is a retired German footballer who played as a midfielder. He made 37 appearances in the Bundesliga for Schalke 04 and 1. FC Köln as well as 168 matches in the 2. Bundesliga for MSV Duisburg, Rot-Weiß Oberhausen and Schalke.
