= Jürgen Luginger =

German footballer and manager

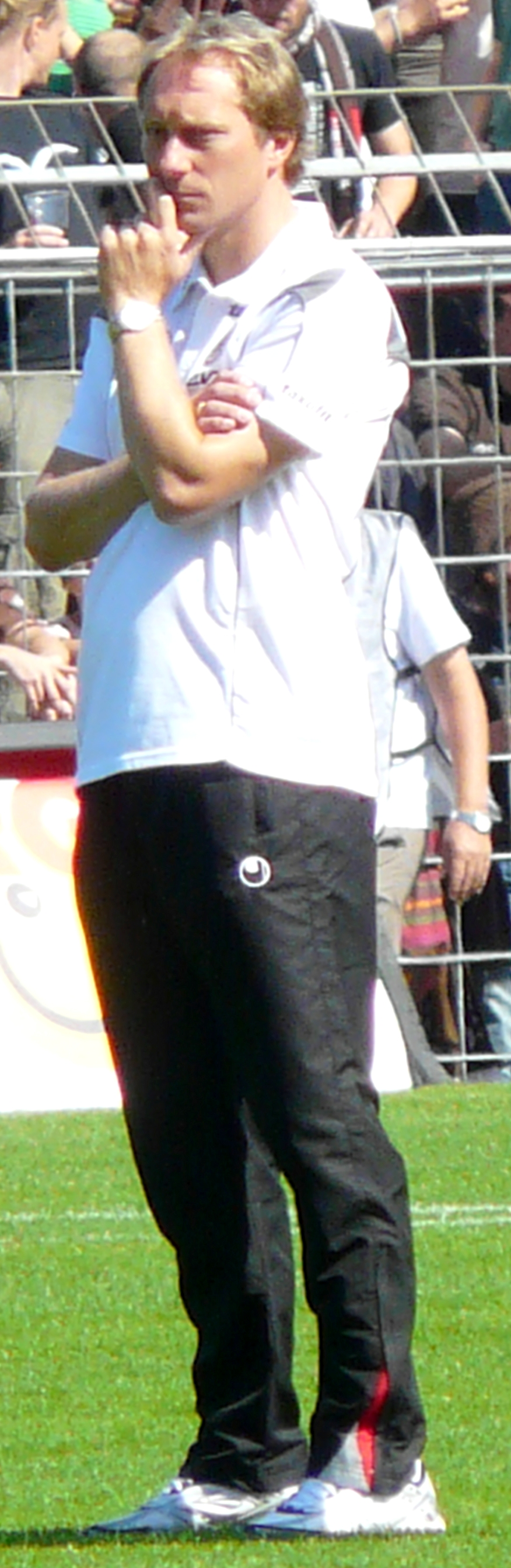
- 2008

Personal information
- Date of birth: 8 December 1967 (age 58)
- Place of birth: Ergolding, West Germany
- Height: 1.80 m (5 ft 11 in)
- Position: Defender

Youth career
- –1985: FC Ergolding
- 1985–1986: 1860 Munich

Senior career*
Years	Team	Apps	(Gls)
1986–1987	Bayer Leverkusen	1	(0)
1987–1988	Fortuna Düsseldorf	33	(0)
1988–1994	Schalke 04	191	(9)
1994–1995	Hannover 96	15	(0)
1995–1997	Waldhof Mannheim	53	(3)
1997–1998	1. FC Saarbrücken	31	(1)
1998–2005	Rot-Weiß Oberhausen	161	(5)

Managerial career
- 2006–2007: KFC Uerdingen 05
- 2008–2010: Rot-Weiß Oberhausen
- 2010–2013: 1. FC Saarbrücken
- 2014: Bayer Leverkusen II
- 2014–2017: Schalke 04 II
- 2017–2020: FC Homburg
- 2025–2026: 1. FC Saarbrücken
- * Club domestic league appearances and goals

Jürgen Luginger (born 8 December 1967) is a German former professional football player and manager.

== Coaching career ==
Luginger became head coach of Schalke 04 II prior to the 2014–15 season.

In April 2017 he became new manager of FC 08 Homburg succeeding Jens Kiefer.

He coached 1. FC Saarbrücken between November 2025 and February 2026.
