= Eberhard Carl =

German footballer (born 1965)

Personal information
- Date of birth: 13 May 1965 (age 61)
- Place of birth: Gündringen, Nagold, West Germany
- Height: 1.80 m (5 ft 11 in)
- Position: Striker

Youth career
- VfL Nagold
- Kehler FV
- SV Gündringen

Senior career*
Years	Team	Apps	(Gls)
1986–1988	SV Böblingen	61	(37)
1988–1989	1. FC Pforzheim	34	(20)
1989–1997	Karlsruher SC	177	(25)
1997–2000	Stuttgarter Kickers	68	(8)
2000–2001	1. FC Pforzheim	33	(13)
2001–2003	TSV Haiterbach		
2005–2007	VfL Herrenberg		

Managerial career
- 2002–2003: TSV Haiterbach (player-manager)
- 2004–2005: SV Böblingen
- 2005–2007: VfL Herrenberg (player-manager)
- 2010: 1. FC Calmbach
- 2010–2013: TSV-Phönix Lomersheim
- 2013–2014: 1. CfR Pforzheim (sports director)
- 2014–2015: 1. CfR Pforzheim
- * Club domestic league appearances and goals

Eberhard Carl (born 13 May 1965) is a German former football coach and a player. A striker, played in the top-tier Bundesliga for eight seasons with Karlsruher SC.

== Playing career ==
In his youth, Carl played for VfL Nagold, Kehler FV, and SV Gündringen.

In 1986, he made his first-team debut with SV Böblingen in the Verbandsliga Württemberg and then moved to 1. FC Pforzheim in the Amateuroberliga BW in 1988.

In 1989, Carl moved to Karlsruher SC in the Bundesliga, where he played for eight years making 177 appearances in the top division, while making many appearances in the European Cup as well. During the 1993–94 UEFA Cup, they advanced to the semi-finals, ultimately losing to Austria Salzburg on away goals, defeating Valencia, PSV Eindhoven, Bordeaux and Boavista in the earlier rounds. In 1996, he advanced to the finals of the DFB-Pokal Final finishing as runner-up after losing to 1. FC Kaiserslautern in the final match.

In 1997, he moved to the 2. Bundesliga club Stuttgarter Kickers where he made 68 appearances in the second tier.

In 2000, he joined 1. FC Pforzheim. He then joined TSV Haiterbach in 2001 and became a player-manager for the 2002–03 season. He then retired to become a full-time manager, but returned to becoming a player-manager with VfL Herrenberg in the Landesliga Württemberg.

== Coaching career ==
After his player career, Carl became an amateur coach with TSV Haiterbach and SV Böblingen. From 2005 to 2007, he coached VfL Herrenberg in the Landesliga in a player-manager role. Afterwards, he moved on to coach 1. FC Calmbach. In 2010, he became the coach for Phönix Lomersheim for three years, helping them get back to the Bezirksliga. In 2013, he became the sporting director at 1. CfR Pforzheim and the coach a year later. In 2017, Carl gave up his job at Pforzheim and moved to the district office, initially as a sports representative, but now he is one of eleven integration managers working with refugees.

== Honours ==
- DFB-Pokal finalist: 1995–96
