= 1995–96 Borussia Dortmund season =

1995–96 season of Borussia Dortmund

Borussia Dortmund
1995–96 season
- Manager: Ottmar Hitzfeld
- Stadium: Westfalenstadion
- Bundesliga: 1st
- DFB-Pokal: Quarter-finals
- UEFA Champions League: Quarter-finals
- DFB-Supercup: Winners
- Top goalscorer: Michael Zorc (15)
Home colours	Away colours

The 1995–96 season was the 87th season in the existence of Borussia Dortmund and the club's 20th consecutive season in the top flight of German football. In addition to the domestic league, Borussia Dortmund participated in this season's edition of the DFB-Pokal, the 1995–96 UEFA Champions League, and the 1995 DFB-Supercup.

== Season summary ==
Dortmund retained their title with a comfortable six-point lead over runners-up Bayern Munich.

== Players ==
=== First team squad ===
Squad at end of season

Note: Flags indicate national team as defined under FIFA eligibility rules; some limited exceptions apply. Players may hold more than one non-FIFA nationality.

No.	Pos.	Nation	Player
1	GK	GER	Stefan Klos
2	MF	GER	Knut Reinhardt
3	DF	GER	Bodo Schmidt
4	MF	GER	Steffen Freund
5	DF	BRA	Júlio César
6	DF	GER	Matthias Sammer
7	DF	GER	Stefan Reuter
8	MF	GER	Michael Zorc
9	FW	SUI	Stéphane Chapuisat
10	MF	GER	Andreas Möller
11	FW	GER	Heiko Herrlich
12	GK	GER	Wolfgang De Beer

No.	Pos.	Nation	Player
13	FW	GER	Karl-Heinz Riedle
14	MF	CZE	Patrik Berger
15	DF	GER	Jürgen Kohler
16	DF	GER	Martin Kree
17	DF	GER	Jörg Heinrich
18	MF	GER	Lars Ricken
20	DF	GER	Günter Kutowski
21	DF	GER	Carsten Wolters
22	FW	GHA	Ibrahim Tanko
23	MF	GER	René Tretschok
24	MF	GER	Thomas Franck
27	FW	URU	Rubén Sosa

=== Left club during season ===
Note: Flags indicate national team as defined under FIFA eligibility rules; some limited exceptions apply. Players may hold more than one non-FIFA nationality.

No.	Pos.	Nation	Player
19	DF	GER	Marco Kurz (to Schalke)
25	DF	AUS	Ned Zelic (to Queens Park Rangers)

No.	Pos.	Nation	Player
26	MF	RSA	Marc Arnold (to Hertha Berlin)

=== Borussia Dortmund II ===
Note: Flags indicate national team as defined under FIFA eligibility rules; some limited exceptions apply. Players may hold more than one non-FIFA nationality.

No. / Pos. / Nation / Player; — / GK / GER / Harald Schumacher	No. / Pos. / Nation / Player; — / FW / GHA / Mallam Yahaya

== Competitions ==
=== Bundesliga ===
==== League table ====
Pos	Team	Pld	W	D	L	GF	GA	GD	Pts	Qualification or relegation
1	Borussia Dortmund (C)	34	19	11	4	76	38	+38	68	Qualification to Champions League group stage
2	Bayern Munich	34	19	5	10	66	46	+20	62	Qualification to UEFA Cup first round
3	Schalke 04	34	14	14	6	45	36	+9	56	Qualification to UEFA Cup first round
4	Borussia Mönchengladbach	34	15	8	11	52	51	+1	53	Qualification to UEFA Cup first round
5	Hamburger SV	34	12	14	8	52	47	+5	50	Qualification to UEFA Cup first round

Source: www.dfb.de
Rules for classification: 1) points; 2) goal difference; 3) number of goals scored.
(C) Champions
