= List of Borussia Dortmund seasons =

This is a list of seasons played by Borussia Dortmund in German and European football, from 1911 (the year of the club's first competitive season) to the most recent completed season. Borussia Dortmund were founded on 19 December 1909.

The club has won the German Championship eight times, the German Cup five times and the German Supercup six times. They also won the UEFA Champions League and the Intercontinental Cup in 1997 and the UEFA Cup Winners' Cup in 1966. Borussia Dortmund was the first German club to win a UEFA competition.

This list details the club's achievements in all competitions, and the top scorers for each season.

== Seasons ==
	Promoted
	Relegated
	Competition not held
—N/a	Did not participate

Season	League									German Cup Competitions			European Competitions				International Competitions		Top goalscorer(s)	
Season	Division	Pld	W	D	L	GF	GA	Pts	Pos	DFB-Pokal	DFB-Ligapokal	Franz Beckenbauer Supercup	UEFA Champions League	UEFA Europa League	UEFA Super Cup	UEFA Cup Winners' Cup	Intercontinental Cup	FIFA Club World Cup	Player(s)	Goals
1911–12	C-Klasse								1st											
1912–13	B-Klasse								3rd											
1913–14	B-Klasse								1st											
1914–15	A-Klasse	10				22	23	9	4th											
1915–16	Only friendlies																			
1916–17	A-Klasse	10				18	11	11	3rd											
1917–18	Only friendlies																			
1918–19	A-Klasse	7				18	8	8	3rd											
1919–20	A-Klasse	18	11	3	4	49	27	25	3rd											
1920–21	A-Klasse	18	13	4	1	50	17	30	1st											
1921–22	1. Kreisliga	18	4	4	10	25	37	12	9th											
1922–23	1. Kreisliga								1st											
1923–24	1. Kreisliga	30	8	4	18	38	47	20	13th											
1924–25	1. Kreisliga	14	8	5	1	43	16	21	1st											
1925–26	2. Bezirksklasse	30	18	6	4	91	26	42	2nd											
1926–27	1. Bezirksklasse	16	5	0	11	28	59	10	9th											
1927–28	2. Bezirksklasse	16	11	1	4	59	34	23	2nd											
1928–29	2. Bezirksklasse	16	4	4	8	21	28	12	6th											
1929–30	2. Bezirksklasse	20	11	3	6	56	38	25	4th											
1930–31	1. Bezirksklasse	18	6	6	6	40	35	18	7th											
1931–32	1. Bezirksklasse	20	15	2	3	72	31	32	1st											
1932–33	1. Bezirksklasse	22	14	6	2	62	26	34	2nd											
1933–34	Bezirksklasse Westfalen	22	8	5	9	50	47	21	6th											
1934–35	Bezirksklasse Westfalen	24	14	5	5	69	33	33	2nd											
1935–36	Bezirksklasse Westfalen	24	16	4	4	70	29	36	1st	—N/a										
1936–37	Gauliga Westfalen	18	9	1	8	39	39	19	3rd	—N/a										
1937–38	Gauliga Westfalen	18	11	4	3	45	28	26	2nd	Quarter-finals										
1938–39	Gauliga Westfalen	18	7	6	5	46	40	20	3rd	First round										
1939–40	Gauliga Westfalen	18	5	1	12	35	60	11	9th	Second round										
1940–41	Gauliga Westfalen	22	10	4	8	62	50	24	4th	—N/a										
1941–42	Gauliga Westfalen	18	11	2	5	58	38	24	2nd	—N/a										
1942–43	Gauliga Westfalen	18	6	5	7	46	46	17	6th	—N/a										
1943–44	Gauliga Westfalen	18	10	4	4	46	21	24	3rd	—N/a										
1944–45 (Note: The season was abandoned due to World War II.)	Gauliga Westfalen	2	2	0	0	7	1	4	1st											
1945–46	Landesliga Westfalen	16	7	5	4	49	33	19	4th											
1946–47	Landesliga Westfalen	18	11	6	1	54	18	28	1st											
1947–48	Oberliga West	24	17	2	5	62	22	36	1st (Note: Eliminated in the German Championship semi-finals vs. FC St. Pauli.)										(Germany) August Lenz	22
1948–49	Oberliga West	24	17	4	3	79	30	38	1st (Note: Lost the German Championship final vs. VfR Mannheim.)										(Germany) Alfred Preißler	26
1949–50	Oberliga West	30	20	3	7	76	36	43	1st (Note: Eliminated in the first round of the German Championship vs. VfR Mannheim.)										(Germany) Alfred Preißler	24
1950–51	Oberliga West	30	14	11	5	52	36	39	3rd										(Germany) Josef Linneweber	18
1951–52	Oberliga West	30	13	8	9	79	53	34	4th										(Germany) Alfred Niepieklo	19
1952–53	Oberliga West	30	20	6	4	87	36	46	1st (Note: Eliminated in the group stage of the German Championship. Finished second in the group behind VfB Stuttgart.)	First round									(Germany) Alfred Preißler	21
1953–54	Oberliga West	30	14	4	12	69	58	32	5th	—N/a									(Germany) Alfred Niepieklo	15
1954–55	Oberliga West	30	12	6	12	63	57	30	5th	—N/a									(Germany) Alfred Preißler	18
1955–56	Oberliga West	30	20	5	5	78	36	45	1st (Note: Won the German Championship final vs. Karlsruher SC.)	—N/a			—N/a						(Germany) Alfred Niepieklo	34
1956–57	Oberliga West	30	17	7	6	73	33	41	1st (Note: Won the German Championship final vs. Hamburger SV.)	—N/a			First round						(Germany) Alfred Kelbassa	36
1957–58	Oberliga West	30	14	7	9	67	44	35	5th	—N/a			Quarter-finals						(Germany) Alfred Kelbassa	25
1958–59	Oberliga West	30	15	5	10	59	47	35	5th	—N/a			—N/a						(Germany) Alfred Schmidt	12
1959–60	Oberliga West	30	14	7	9	81	62	35	3rd	—N/a			—N/a						(Germany) Jürgen Schütz	36
1960–61	Oberliga West	30	15	9	6	70	46	39	2nd (Note: Lost the German Championship final vs. 1. FC Nürnberg.)	—N/a			—N/a			—N/a			(Germany) Jürgen Schütz	31
1961–62	Oberliga West	30	12	8	10	67	51	32	8th	—N/a			—N/a			—N/a	—N/a		(Germany) Jürgen Schütz	20
1962–63	Oberliga West	30	19	2	9	77	39	40	2nd (Note: Won the German Championship final vs. 1. FC Köln.)	Runners-up			—N/a			—N/a	—N/a		(Germany) Jürgen Schütz	29
1963–64	Bundesliga	30	14	5	11	73	57	33	4th	First round			Semi-finals			—N/a	—N/a		(Germany) Friedhelm Konietzka	24
1964–65	Bundesliga	30	15	6	9	67	48	36	3rd	Winners			—N/a			—N/a	—N/a		(Germany) Friedhelm Konietzka	25
1965–66	Bundesliga	34	19	9	6	70	36	47	2nd	—N/a			—N/a			Winners	—N/a		(Germany) Lothar Emmerich	45
1966–67	Bundesliga	34	15	9	10	70	41	39	3rd	First round			—N/a			Second round	—N/a		(Germany) Lothar Emmerich	30
1967–68	Bundesliga	34	12	7	15	60	59	31	14th	Semi-finals			—N/a			—N/a	—N/a		(Germany) Lothar Emmerich	19
1968–69	Bundesliga	34	11	8	15	49	54	30	16th	First round			—N/a			—N/a	—N/a		(Germany) Lothar Emmerich	12
1969–70	Bundesliga	34	14	8	12	60	67	36	5th	Round of 16			—N/a			—N/a	—N/a		(Germany) Werner Weist	19
1970–71	Bundesliga	34	10	9	15	54	60	29	13th	Round of 16			—N/a			—N/a	—N/a		(Germany) Werner Weist	10
1971–72	Bundesliga	34	6	8	20	34	83	20	17th	First round			—N/a	—N/a		—N/a	—N/a		(Germany) Jürgen Schütz	11
1972–73	Regionalliga West	34	16	9	9	77	45	41	4th	—N/a	Group stage		—N/a	—N/a		—N/a	—N/a		Two players (Note: Horst Bertl Theo Bücker)	17
1973–74	Regionalliga West	34	15	7	12	63	50	37	6th	First round			—N/a	—N/a	—N/a	—N/a	—N/a		(Germany) Burkhard Segler	20
1974–75	2. Bundesliga	38	17	12	9	65	44	46	6th	Semi-finals			—N/a	—N/a		—N/a	—N/a		(Germany) Burkhard Segler	17
1975–76	2. Bundesliga	38	22	8	8	93	37	52	2nd	Second round			—N/a	—N/a	—N/a	—N/a	—N/a		(Germany) Hans-Werner Hartl	20
1976–77	Bundesliga	34	12	10	12	73	64	34	8th	Third round			—N/a	—N/a	—N/a	—N/a	—N/a		(Germany) Erwin Kostedde	17
1977–78	Bundesliga	34	14	5	15	57	71	33	11th	Second round			—N/a	—N/a	—N/a	—N/a	—N/a		(Germany) Manfred Burgsmüller	21
1978–79	Bundesliga	34	10	11	13	54	70	31	12th	Round of 16			—N/a	—N/a	—N/a	—N/a	—N/a		(Germany) Manfred Burgsmüller	20
1979–80	Bundesliga	34	14	8	12	64	56	36	6th	Semi-finals			—N/a	—N/a	—N/a	—N/a	—N/a		(Germany) Manfred Burgsmüller	29
1980–81	Bundesliga	34	13	9	12	69	59	35	7th	Third round			—N/a	—N/a	—N/a	—N/a	—N/a		(Germany) Manfred Burgsmüller	28
1981–82	Bundesliga	34	18	5	11	59	40	41	6th	Third round			—N/a	—N/a		—N/a	—N/a		(Germany) Manfred Burgsmüller	26
1982–83	Bundesliga	34	16	7	11	78	62	39	7th	Semi-finals			—N/a	First round	—N/a	—N/a	—N/a		(Germany) Manfred Burgsmüller	20
1983–84	Bundesliga	34	11	8	15	54	65	30	13th	First round			—N/a	—N/a	—N/a	—N/a	—N/a		(Germany) Bernd Klotz	10
1984–85	Bundesliga	34	13	4	17	51	65	30	14th	Second round			—N/a	—N/a	—N/a	—N/a	—N/a		Three players (Note: Michael Zorc Wolfgang Schüler Jürgen Wegmann)	8
1985–86	Bundesliga	34	10	8	6	49	65	28	16th	Semi-finals			—N/a	—N/a		—N/a	—N/a		(Germany) Jürgen Wegmann	21
1986–87	Bundesliga	34	15	10	9	70	50	40	4th	Second round			—N/a	—N/a	—N/a	—N/a	—N/a		(Germany) Norbert Dickel	22
1987–88	Bundesliga	34	9	11	14	51	54	29	13th	Round of 16		—N/a	—N/a	Third round	—N/a	—N/a	—N/a		(Germany) Frank Mill	15
1988–89	Bundesliga	34	12	13	9	56	40	37	7th	Winners		—N/a	—N/a	—N/a	—N/a	—N/a	—N/a		(Germany) Norbert Dickel	15
1989–90	Bundesliga	34	15	11	8	51	35	41	4th	Second round		Winners	—N/a	—N/a	—N/a	Second round	—N/a		(Germany) Michael Zorc	12
1990–91	Bundesliga	34	10	14	10	46	57	34	10th	First round		—N/a	—N/a	Third round	—N/a	—N/a	—N/a		(Germany) Michael Rummenigge	9
1991–92	Bundesliga	38	20	12	6	66	47	52	2nd	Third round		—N/a	—N/a	—N/a	—N/a	—N/a	—N/a		(Switzerland) Stéphane Chapuisat	21
1992–93	Bundesliga	34	18	5	7	61	43	41	4th	Round of 16		—N/a	—N/a	Runners-up	—N/a	—N/a	—N/a		(Switzerland) Stéphane Chapuisat	20
1993–94	Bundesliga	34	15	9	10	49	45	39	4th	Second round		—N/a	—N/a	Quarter-finals	—N/a	—N/a	—N/a		(Switzerland) Stéphane Chapuisat	21
1994–95	Bundesliga	34	20	9	5	67	33	49	1st	Second round		—N/a	—N/a	Semi-finals	—N/a	—N/a	—N/a		(Germany) Andreas Möller	17
1995–96	Bundesliga	34	19	11	4	76	38	68	1st	Quarter-finals		Winners	Quarter-finals	—N/a	—N/a	—N/a	—N/a		(Germany) Michael Zorc	17
1996–97	Bundesliga	34	19	6	9	63	41	63	3rd	First round		Winners	Winners	—N/a	—N/a	—N/a	—N/a		(Switzerland) Stéphane Chapuisat	16
1997–98	Bundesliga	34	11	10	13	57	55	43	10th	Round of 16	Semi-finals		Semi-finals	—N/a	Runners-up	—N/a	Winners		(Switzerland) Stéphane Chapuisat	20
1998–99	Bundesliga	34	16	9	9	48	34	57	4th	Round of 16	—N/a		—N/a	—N/a	—N/a	—N/a	—N/a		(Switzerland) Stéphane Chapuisat	8
1999–2000	Bundesliga	34	9	13	12	41	38	40	11th	Third round	—N/a		—N/a	Fourth round	—N/a		—N/a	—N/a	(Germany) Fredi Bobic	12
2000–01	Bundesliga	34	16	10	8	62	42	58	3rd	Round of 16	—N/a		—N/a	—N/a	—N/a		—N/a		Three players (Note: Fredi Bobic Giuseppe Reina Heiko Herrlich)	10
2001–02	Bundesliga	34	21	7	6	62	33	70	1st	First round	Semi-finals		—N/a	Runners-up	—N/a		—N/a		(Brazil) Márcio Amoroso	26
2002–03	Bundesliga	34	15	13	6	51	27	58	3rd	Second round	Semi-finals		Second round	—N/a	—N/a		—N/a		(Czech Republic) Jan Koller	22
2003–04	Bundesliga	34	16	7	11	59	48	55	6th	Second round	Runners-up		—N/a	Second round	—N/a		—N/a		Two players (Note: Ewerthon Jan Koller)	19
2004–05	Bundesliga	34	15	10	9	47	44	55	7th	Round of 16	—N/a		—N/a	—N/a	—N/a		—N/a		(Czech Republic) Jan Koller	16
2005–06	Bundesliga	34	11	13	10	45	42	46	7th	First round	—N/a		—N/a	—N/a	—N/a			—N/a	(Poland) Ebi Smolarek	13
2006–07	Bundesliga	34	12	8	14	41	43	44	9th	Second round	—N/a		—N/a	—N/a	—N/a			—N/a	(Switzerland) Alexander Frei	17
2007–08	Bundesliga	34	10	10	14	50	62	40	13th	Runners-up	—N/a		—N/a	—N/a	—N/a			—N/a	(Croatia) Mladen Petrić	18
2008–09	Bundesliga	34	15	14	5	60	37	59	6th	Round of 16			—N/a	First round	—N/a			—N/a	(Switzerland) Alexander Frei	14
2009–10	Bundesliga	34	16	9	9	54	42	57	5th	Round of 16			—N/a	—N/a	—N/a			—N/a	(Paraguay) Lucas Barrios	23
2010–11	Bundesliga	34	23	6	5	67	22	75	1st	Second round		—N/a	—N/a	Group stage	—N/a			—N/a	(Paraguay) Lucas Barrios	21
2011–12	Bundesliga	34	25	6	3	80	25	81	1st	Winners		Runners-up	Group stage	—N/a	—N/a			—N/a	(Poland) Robert Lewandowski	30
2012–13	Bundesliga	34	19	9	6	81	42	66	2nd	Quarter-finals		Runners-up	Runners-up	—N/a	—N/a			—N/a	(Poland) Robert Lewandowski	36
2013–14	Bundesliga	34	22	5	7	80	38	71	2nd	Runners-up		Winners	Quarter-finals	—N/a	—N/a			—N/a	(Poland) Robert Lewandowski	28
2014–15	Bundesliga	34	13	7	14	47	42	46	7th	Runners-up		Winners	Round of 16	—N/a	—N/a			—N/a	(Gabon) Pierre-Emerick Aubameyang	25
2015–16	Bundesliga	34	24	6	4	82	34	78	2nd	Runners-up		—N/a	—N/a	Quarter-finals	—N/a			—N/a	(Gabon) Pierre-Emerick Aubameyang	39
2016–17	Bundesliga	34	18	10	6	72	40	64	3rd	Winners		Runners-up	Quarter-finals	—N/a	—N/a			—N/a	(Gabon) Pierre-Emerick Aubameyang	40
2017–18	Bundesliga	34	15	10	9	64	47	55	4th	Round of 16		Runners-up	Group stage	Round of 16	—N/a			—N/a	(Gabon) Pierre-Emerick Aubameyang	21
2018–19	Bundesliga	34	23	7	4	81	44	76	2nd	Round of 16		—N/a	Round of 16	—N/a	—N/a			—N/a	(Germany) Marco Reus	21
2019–20	Bundesliga	34	21	6	7	84	41	69	2nd	Round of 16		Winners	Round of 16	—N/a	—N/a			—N/a	(England) Jadon Sancho	20
2020–21	Bundesliga	34	20	4	10	75	46	64	3rd	Winners		Runners-up	Quarter-finals	—N/a	—N/a			—N/a	(Norway) Erling Haaland	41
2021–22	Bundesliga	34	22	3	9	85	52	69	2nd	Round of 16		Runners-up	Group stage	Knockout round play-offs	—N/a			—N/a	(Norway) Erling Haaland	29
2022–23	Bundesliga	34	22	5	7	83	44	71	2nd	Quarter-finals		—N/a	Round of 16	—N/a	—N/a			—N/a	(England) Jude Bellingham	14
2023–24	Bundesliga	34	18	9	7	68	43	63	5th	Round of 16		—N/a	Runners-up	—N/a	—N/a			—N/a	Two players (Note: Niclas Füllkrug Donyell Malen)	15
2024–25	Bundesliga	34	17	6	11	71	51	57	4th	Second round		—N/a	Quarter-finals	—N/a	—N/a			Quarter-finals	(Guinea) Serhou Guirassy	38
2025–26	Bundesliga	34	22	7	5	70	34	73	2nd	Round of 16		—N/a	Knockout phase play-offs	—N/a	—N/a				(Guinea) Serhou Guirassy	22
2026–27	Bundesliga	34	TBA	TBA	TBA	TBA	TBA	TBA	TBA	TBA		Runners-up	TBA	—N/a	—N/a				TBA	TBA
Season	Division	Pld	W	D	L	GF	GA	Pts	Pos	DFB-Pokal	DFB-Ligapokal	Franz Beckenbauer Supercup	UEFA Champions League	UEFA Europa League	UEFA Super Cup	UEFA Cup Winners' Cup	Intercontinental Cup	FIFA Club World Cup	Player(s)	Goals
Season	League									German Cup Competitions			European Competitions				International Competitions		Top goalscorer(s)	
