= 1994–95 Borussia Dortmund season =

Borussia Dortmund
1994–95 season
- Stadium: Westfalenstadion
- Bundesliga: 1st
- DFB-Pokal: Second round
- UEFA Cup: Semi-finals
- Biggest win: 1. FC Köln 1–6 Borussia Dortmund; Borussia Dortmund 5–0 VfB Stuttgart
- Biggest defeat: Eintracht Frankfurt 4–1 Borussia Dortmund; Borussia Dortmund 0–3 Bayer Leverkusen
Home Kit colours	Away Kit colours

The 1994–95 season was the 86th season in the existence of Borussia Dortmund and the club's 19th consecutive season in the top flight of German football. In addition to the domestic league, Borussia Dortmund participated in this season's edition of the DFB-Pokal and the UEFA Cup.

This season was marked by a high level of excitement until the last rounds as Dortmund remained on top until round 28, losing it to Bremen who held it until the last round when they lost to Bayern 3–1. Dortmund won the league trophy for the first time in its current version and fourth overall.

== Competitions ==
=== Overall record ===
Competition	First match	Last match	Starting round	Final position	Record							
Competition	First match	Last match	Starting round	Final position	Pld	W	D	L	GF	GA	GD	Win %
Bundesliga	20 August 1994	17 June 1995	Matchday 1	Winners	34	20	9	5	67	33	+34	58.82
DFB-Pokal	13 August 1994	20 September 1994	First round	Second round	2	1	0	1	5	6	−1	50.00
UEFA Cup	13 September 1994	18 April 1995	First round	Semi-finals	10	5	1	4	15	9	+6	50.00
Total					46	26	10	10	87	48	+39	56.52

Source: Competitions

=== Bundesliga ===
==== League table ====
Pos	Team	Pld	W	D	L	GF	GA	GD	Pts	Qualification or relegation
1	Borussia Dortmund (C)	34	20	9	5	67	33	+34	49	Qualification to Champions League group stage
2	Werder Bremen	34	20	8	6	70	39	+31	48	Qualification to UEFA Cup first round
3	SC Freiburg	34	20	6	8	66	44	+22	46	Qualification to UEFA Cup first round
4	1. FC Kaiserslautern	34	17	12	5	58	41	+17	46	Qualification to UEFA Cup first round
5	Borussia Mönchengladbach	34	17	9	8	66	41	+25	43	Qualification to Cup Winners' Cup first round

Source: www.dfb.de
Rules for classification: 1) points; 2) goal difference; 3) number of goals scored.
(C) Champions

==== Results summary ====
Overall								Home						Away					
Pld	W	D	L	GF	GA	GD	Pts	W	D	L	GF	GA	GD	W	D	L	GF	GA	GD
34	20	9	5	67	33	+34	69	13	3	1	35	13	+22	7	6	4	32	20	+12

Source: DFB

==== Results by round ====
Round	1	2	3	4	5	6	7	8	9	10	11	12	13	14	15	16	17	18	19	20	21	22	23	24	25	26	27	28	29	30	31	32	33	34
Ground	H	A	H	A	A	H	A	H	A	H	A	H	A	H	A	H	A	A	H	A	H	H	A	H	A	H	A	H	A	H	A	H	A	H
Result	W	W	W	L	D	W	W	W	D	W	W	W	W	D	D	W	W	W	W	L	D	L	D	W	D	W	L	W	L	W	D	D	W	W
Position	1	1	1	2	2	2	1	1	1	1	1	1	1	1	1	1	1	1	1	1	1	1	1	1	1	1	1	1	2	2	2	2	2	1

Source: DFB
A = Away; H = Home; W = Win; D = Draw; L = Loss

==== Matches ====
20 August 1994 1	Borussia Dortmund	4–0	1860 Munich	Dortmund
15:30 CEST (UTC+2)				Stadium: Westfalenstadion

23 August 1994 2	1. FC Köln	1–6	Borussia Dortmund	Cologne
20:00 CEST (UTC+2)				Stadium: Müngersdorfer Stadion

26 August 1994 3	Borussia Dortmund	2–1	1. FC Kaiserslautern	Dortmund
20:00 CEST (UTC+2)				Stadium: Westfalenstadion

3 September 1994 4	Eintracht Frankfurt	4–1	Borussia Dortmund	Frankfurt
15:30 CEST (UTC+2)				Stadium: Waldstadion

17 September 1994 5	Bayer Leverkusen	2–2	Borussia Dortmund	Leverkusen
15:30 CEST (UTC+2)				Stadium: Ulrich-Haberland-Stadion

24 September 1994 6	Borussia Dortmund	5–0	VfB Stuttgart	Dortmund
15:30 CEST (UTC+2)				Stadium: Westfalenstadion

1 October 1994 7	Bayer 05 Uerdingen	0–2	Borussia Dortmund	Krefeld
15:30 CET (UTC+1)				Stadium: Grotenburg-Stadion

8 October 1994 8	Borussia Dortmund	3–2	Schalke 04	Dortmund
15:30 CET (UTC+1)				Stadium: Westfalenstadion

15 October 1994 9	Karlsruher SC	0–0	Borussia Dortmund	Karlsruhe
15:30 CET (UTC+1)				Stadium: Wildparkstadion

22 October 1994 10	Borussia Dortmund	1–0	Bayern Munich	Dortmund
15:30 CET (UTC+1)				Stadium: Westfalenstadion

29 October 1994 11	Dynamo Dresden	0–1	Borussia Dortmund	Dresden
15:30 CET (UTC+1)				Stadium: Rudolf-Harbig-Stadion

6 November 1994 12	Borussia Dortmund	2–0	Werder Bremen	Dortmund
20:00 CET (UTC+1)				Stadium: Westfalenstadion

11 November 1994 13	VfL Bochum	0–2	Borussia Dortmund	Bochum
20:00 CET (UTC+1)				Stadium: Ruhrstadion

19 November 1994 14	Borussia Dortmund	1–1	SC Freiburg	Dortmund
15:30 CET (UTC+1)				Stadium: Westfalenstadion

26 November 1994 15	Borussia Mönchengladbach	3–3	Borussia Dortmund	Mönchengladbach
15:30 CET (UTC+1)				Stadium: Bökelbergstadion

2 December 1994 16	Borussia Dortmund	1–0	MSV Duisburg	Dortmund
20:00 CET (UTC+1)				Stadium: Westfalenstadion

10 December 1994 17	Hamburger SV	0–4	Borussia Dortmund	Hamburg
15:30 CET (UTC+1)				Stadium: Volksparkstadion

18 December 1994 18	1860 Munich	1–5	Borussia Dortmund	Munich
15:30 CET (UTC+1)				Stadium: Grünwalder Stadion

25 February 1995 19	Borussia Dortmund	2–1	1. FC Köln	Dortmund
15:30 CET (UTC+1)				Stadium: Westfalenstadion

4 March 1995 20	1. FC Kaiserslautern	1–0	Borussia Dortmund	Kaiserslautern
15:30 CET (UTC+1)				Stadium: Fritz-Walter-Stadion

11 March 1995 21	Borussia Dortmund	1–1	Eintracht Frankfurt	Dortmund
15:30 CET (UTC+1)				Stadium: Westfalenstadion

18 March 1995 22	Borussia Dortmund	0–3	Bayer Leverkusen	Dortmund
15:30 CET (UTC+1)				Stadium: Westfalenstadion

25 March 1995 23	VfB Stuttgart	0–0	Borussia Dortmund	Stuttgart
15:30 CET (UTC+1)				Stadium: Gottlieb-Daimler-Stadion

1 April 1995 24	Borussia Dortmund	3–1	Bayer 05 Uerdingen	Dortmund
15:30 CET (UTC+1)				Stadium: Westfalenstadion

8 April 1995 25	Schalke 04	0–0	Borussia Dortmund	Gelsenkirchen
15:30 CET (UTC+1)				Stadium: Parkstadion

13 April 1995 26	Borussia Dortmund	2–1	Karlsruher SC	Dortmund
20:00 CET (UTC+1)				Stadium: Westfalenstadion

22 April 1995 27	Bayern Munich	2–1	Borussia Dortmund	Munich
15:30 CET (UTC+1)				Stadium: Olympiastadion

29 April 1995 28	Borussia Dortmund	2–0	Dynamo Dresden	Dortmund
15:30 CET (UTC+1)				Stadium: Westfalenstadion

7 May 1995 29	Werder Bremen	3–1	Borussia Dortmund	Bremen
20:00 CET (UTC+1)	Herzog 54'; Basler 59', 87'		Möller 90' (pen.)	Stadium: Weser-Stadion; Attendance: 39,200; Referee: Markus Merk

13 May 1995 30	Borussia Dortmund	3–1	VfL Bochum	Dortmund
15:30 CET (UTC+1)	Zorc 54' (pen.); Möller 57'; Reuter 81'		Wegmann 64'	Stadium: Westfalenstadion; Attendance: 42,800; Referee: Hans-Jürgen Weber

20 May 1995 31	SC Freiburg	1–1	Borussia Dortmund	Freiburg
15:30 CET (UTC+1)	Sammer 75' (o.g.)		Zorc 48'	Stadium: Dreisamstadion; Attendance: 16,500; Referee: Wolf-Gunter Wiesel

28 May 1995 32	Borussia Dortmund	1–1	Borussia Mönchengladbach	Dortmund
20:00 CET (UTC+1)	Freund 72'		Herrlich 49'	Stadium: Westfalenstadion; Attendance: 42,800; Referee: Michael Malbranc

10 June 1995 33	MSV Duisburg	2–3	Borussia Dortmund	Duisburg
15:30 CET (UTC+1)				Stadium: Wedaustadion; Attendance: 30,128; Referee: Jürgen Aust

17 June 1995 34	Borussia Dortmund	2–0	Hamburger SV	Dortmund
15:30 CET (UTC+1)	Möller 9'; Ricken 28'			Stadium: Westfalenstadion; Attendance: 42,800; Referee: Eugen Strigel

=== UEFA Cup ===
==== First round ====
13 September 1994 First leg	Borussia Dortmund (Germany)	1–0	(Scotland) Motherwell	Dortmund, Germany
--:-- CEST (UTC+2)	Andreas Möller 58'			Stadium: Westfalenstadion; Referee: Charles Agius (Malta)

28 September 1994 Second leg	Motherwell (Scotland)	0–2 (0–3 agg.)	(Germany) Borussia Dortmund	Motherwell, Scotland
--:-- CEST (UTC+2)			Riedle 54', 64'	Stadium: Fir Park; Referee: Anders Frisk (Sweden)

==== Second round ====
18 October 1994 First leg	Slovan Bratislava (Slovakia)	2–1	(Germany) Borussia Dortmund	Bratislava, Slovakia
--:-- CEST (UTC+2)				Stadium: Tehelné pole

3 November 1994 Second leg	Borussia Dortmund (Germany)	3–0 (4–2 agg.)	(Slovakia) Slovan Bratislava	Dortmund, Germany
--:-- CET (UTC+1)				Stadium: Westfalenstadion

==== Third round ====
22 November 1994 First leg	Deportivo La Coruña (Spain)	1–0	(Germany) Borussia Dortmund	A Coruña, Spain
--:-- CET (UTC+1)				Stadium: Riazor

6 December 1994 Second leg	Borussia Dortmund (Germany)	3–1 (a.e.t.) (3–2 agg.)	(Spain) Deportivo La Coruña	Dortmund, Germany
--:-- CET (UTC+1)				Stadium: Westfalenstadion

==== Quarter-finals ====
28 February 1995 First leg	Lazio (Italy)	1–0	(Germany) Borussia Dortmund	Rome, Italy
--:-- CET (UTC+1)				Stadium: Stadio Olimpico

14 March 1995 Second leg	Borussia Dortmund (Germany)	2–0 (2–1 agg.)	(Italy) Lazio	Dortmund, Germany
--:-- CET (UTC+1)				Stadium: Westfalenstadion

==== Semi-finals ====
4 April 1995 First leg	Juventus (Italy)	2–2	(Germany) Borussia Dortmund	Milan, Italy
--:-- CEST (UTC+2)	R. Baggio 28'; Kohler 88'	Report	Reuter 8'; Möller 71'	Stadium: Stadio Giuseppe Meazza; Attendance: 78,800; Referee: Marc Batta (France)

18 April 1995 Second leg	Borussia Dortmund (Germany)	1–2 (3–4 agg.)	(Italy) Juventus	Dortmund, Germany
--:-- CEST (UTC+2)	Júlio César 10'	Report	Porrini 6'; R. Baggio 31'	Stadium: Westfalenstadion; Referee: Mario van der Ende (Netherlands)

== Statistics ==
=== Appearances and goals ===
As of 17 June 1995

No.	Pos	Nat	Player	Total		Bundesliga		DFB-Pokal		UEFA Cup	
No.	Pos	Nat	Player	Apps	Goals	Apps	Goals	Apps	Goals	Apps	Goals
Goalkeepers
1	GK	(Germany) GER	Stefan Klos	46	0	34	0	2	0	10	0
Defenders
3	DF	(Germany) GER	Bodo Schmidt	41	0	30	0	2	0	9	0
5	DF	(Brazil) BRA	Júlio César	37	3	25	1	2	1	10	1
6	MF	(Germany) GER	Matthias Sammer	36	5	28	4	1	1	7	0
16	DF	(Germany) GER	Martin Kree	32	1	16+8	1	1	0	5+2	0
19	DF	(Germany) GER	Marco Kurz	7	0	2+2	0	0+1	0	1+1	0
20	DF	(Germany) GER	Günter Kutowski	9	0	3+5	0	0	0	0+1	0
25	DF	(Australia) AUS	Ned Zelic	5	0	2+2	0	0	0	0+1	0
Midfielders
2	MF	(Germany) GER	Knut Reinhardt	37	0	25+2	0	2	0	8	0
4	MF	(Germany) GER	Steffen Freund	38	2	27+1	2	1	0	9	0
7	MF	(Germany) GER	Stefan Reuter	44	5	33	4	2	0	9	1
8	MF	(Germany) GER	Michael Zorc	44	16	33	15	2	0	9	1
10	MF	(Germany) GER	Andreas Möller	41	17	30	14	2	0	9	3
15	MF	(South Africa) RSA	Marc Arnold	10	0	2+7	0	0	0	1	0
18	MF	(Germany) GER	Lars Ricken	28	3	12+9	2	0	0	1+6	1
23	MF	(Germany) GER	René Tretschok	18	3	7+8	3	0	0	3	0
24	MF	(Germany) GER	Thomas Franck	21	1	8+7	1	1+1	0	2+2	0
26	MF	(Germany) GER	Frank Riethmann	1	0	0+1	0	0	0	0	0
28	MF	(Ghana) GHA	Mallam Yahaya	2	0	0+2	0	0	0	0	0
Forwards
9	FW	(Switzerland) SUI	Stéphane Chapuisat	29	14	20	12	2	1	7	1
13	FW	(Germany) GER	Karl-Heinz Riedle	40	13	28+1	6	1+1	1	9	6
14	FW	(Denmark) DEN	Flemming Povlsen	9	2	1+5	1	1+1	1	0+1	0
22	FW	(Ghana) GHA	Ibrahim Tanko	18	1	8+6	1	0	0	1+3	0
