= 1993–94 Borussia Dortmund season =

Borussia Dortmund
1993–94 season
- Manager: Ottmar Hitzfeld
- Stadium: Westfalenstadion
- Bundesliga: 4th
- DFB-Pokal: Second round
- UEFA Cup: Quarter-finals
- Top goalscorer: League: Stéphane Chapuisat (17 goals); All: Stéphane Chapuisat (26 goals)
- Highest home attendance: 42,800
- Average home league attendance: 42,074

In the 1993–94 season, Borussia Dortmund participated in the Bundesliga, the DFB-Pokal, and the UEFA Cup. They finished fourth in the league, lost to Carl Zeiss Jena in the second round of the DFB-Pokal and reached the quarter-finals of the UEFA Cup, losing to Inter Milan.

== Squad ==
Note: Flags indicate national team as defined under FIFA eligibility rules; some limited exceptions apply. Players may hold more than one non-FIFA nationality.

Pos.	Nation	Player
GK	GER	Stefan Klos
DF	GER	Uwe Grauer
DF	GER	Günter Kutowski
DF	GER	Stefan Reuter
DF	GER	Bodo Schmidt
DF	GER	Michael Schulz
DF	AUS	Ned Zelic
MF	GER	Thomas Franck
MF	GER	Steffen Freund
MF	GER	Steffen Karl
MF	GER	Gerhard Poschner
MF	GER	Knut Reinhardt
MF	GER	Lars Ricken
MF	ARG	Leonardo Rodríguez

Pos.	Nation	Player
MF	GER	Matthias Sammer
MF	GER	Michael Zorc
FW	SUI	Stéphane Chapuisat
FW	GER	Frank Mill
FW	DEN	Flemming Povlsen
FW	GER	Karl-Heinz Riedle
FW	GER	Michael Rummenigge
FW	GER	Lothar Sippel

== Competitions ==
=== Bundesliga ===
==== League table ====
Pos	Team	Pld	W	D	L	GF	GA	GD	Pts	Qualification or relegation
2	1. FC Kaiserslautern	34	18	7	9	64	36	+28	43	Qualification to UEFA Cup first round
3	Bayer Leverkusen	34	14	11	9	60	47	+13	39	Qualification to UEFA Cup first round
4	Borussia Dortmund	34	15	9	10	49	45	+4	39	Qualification to UEFA Cup first round
5	Eintracht Frankfurt	34	15	8	11	57	41	+16	38	Qualification to UEFA Cup first round
6	Karlsruher SC	34	14	10	10	46	43	+3	38	

Source: www.dfb.de
Rules for classification: 1) points; 2) goal difference; 3) number of goals scored.

==== Matches ====
6 August 1993 1	Borussia Dortmund	2-1	Karlsruhe	Westfalenstadion, Dortmund
20:00	Sammer 59'; Chapuisat 63'		Carl 90'	Attendance: 40,552; Referee: Hartmut Strampe

15 August 1993 2	Schalke 04	1-0	Borussia Dortmund	Parkstadion, Gelsenkirchen
18:00	Mulder 79'			Attendance: 65,000; Referee: Hans Fux

21 August 1993 3	Borussia Dortmund	3-2	Freiburg	Westfalenstadion, Dortmund
15:30	Riedle 59'; Zorc 78'; Sammer 80'		Cardoso 12' (pen.); Heidenreich 56'	Attendance: 42,800; Referee: Volkmar Fischer

28 August 1993 4	Bayer Leverkusen	2-1	Borussia Dortmund	Ulrich-Haberland-Stadion, Leverkusen
15:30	Paulo Sérgio 20'; Fischer 63'		Rummenigge 28'	Attendance: 27,400; Referee: Hans-Joachim Osmers

1 September 1993 5	Borussia Dortmund	4-0	Dynamo Dresden	Westfalenstadion, Dortmund
20:00	Chapuisat 37', 72', 90'; Riedle 89'			Attendance: 39,000; Referee: Manfred Schmidt

4 September 1993 6	VfB Stuttgart	2-2	Borussia Dortmund	Neckarstadion, Stuttgart
15:30	Walter 18' (pen.); Dunga 90'		Zelic 45'; Sippel 88'	Attendance: 33,000; Referee: Edgar Steinborn

7 September 1993 7	Borussia Dortmund	0-1	Leipzig	Westfalenstadion, Dortmund
20:00			Rische 9'	Attendance: 40,590; Referee: Hans-Peter Best

18 September 1993 8	MSV Duisburg	2-2	Borussia Dortmund	Wedaustadion, Duisburg
15:30	Schmidt 39'; Közle 47'		Chapuisat 13'; Sammer 56'	Attendance: 28,104; Referee: Alfons Berg

25 September 1993 9	Borussia Dortmund	1-1	Bayern Munich	Westfalenstadion, Dortmund
15:30	Karl 65'		Scholl 27'	Attendance: 42,800; Referee: Wieland Ziller

3 October 1993 10	Wattenscheid 09	1-2	Borussia Dortmund	Lohrheidestadion, Bochum
18:00	Lesniak 28'		Zorc 69'; Chapuisat 74'	Attendance: 28,000; Referee: Karl-Heinz Gläser

8 October 1993 11	Werder Bremen	4-0	Borussia Dortmund	Weserstadion, Bremen
20:00	Votava 52'; Hobsch 70'; Eilts 71'; Herzog 72'			Attendance: 36,060; Referee: Aron Schmidhuber

16 October 1993 12	Borussia Dortmund	2-1	Hamburger SV	Westfalenstadion, Dortmund
15:30	Zorc 49'; Stéphane Chapuisat 52'		Bäron 88'	Attendance: 42,800; Referee: Eugen Strigel

23 October 1993 13	Köln	2-0	Borussia Dortmund	Müngersdorfer Stadion, Cologne
15:30	Polster 69' (pen.), 71'			Attendance: 41,000; Referee: Hans Scheuerer

29 October 1993 14	Borussia Dortmund	3-0	Borussia Mönchengladbach	Westfalenstadion, Dortmund
20:00	Poschner 19', 57'; Riedle 75'			Attendance: 42,800; Referee: Karl-Josef Assenmacher

6 November 1993 15	Eintracht Frankfurt	2-0	Borussia Dortmund	Waldstadion, Frankfurt
15:30	Gaudino 82' (pen.); Bommer 90'			Attendance: 44,300; Referee: Michael Malbranc

12 November 1993 16	Borussia Dortmund	2-1	Kaiserslautern	Westfalenstadion, Dortmund
20:00	Zorc 17'; Schulz 87'		Kuntz 10'	Attendance: 42,800; Referee: Hans Fux

20 November 1993 17	Nürnberg	0-0	Borussia Dortmund	Frankenstadion, Nuremberg
15:30				Attendance: 44,500; Referee: Markus Merk

27 November 1993 18	Karlsruhe	3-3	Borussia Dortmund	Wildparkstadion, Karlsruhe
15:30	Kiryakov 28', 43', 45'		Poschner 3'; Chapuisat 16', 18'	Attendance: 15,000; Referee: Wolf-Günter Wiesel

3 December 1993 19	Borussia Dortmund	1-1	Schalke 04	Westfalenstadion, Dortmund
20:00	Sammer 86'		Sendscheid 55'	Attendance: 42,800; Referee: Hans-Jürgen Weber

11 December 1993 20	Freiburg	4-1	Borussia Dortmund	Dreisamstadion, Freiburg
15:30	Cardoso 39', 78'; Todt 53'; Wassmer 79'		Chapuisat 59'	Attendance: 15,000; Referee: Lutz Michael Fröhlich

12 February 1994 21	Borussia Dortmund	1-0	Bayer Leverkusen	Westfalenstadion, Dortmund
15:30	Chapuisat 38'			Attendance: 41,130; Referee: Bernd Heynemann

18 February 1994 22	Dynamo Dresden	3-0	Borussia Dortmund	Rudolf-Harbig-Stadion, Nuremberg
20:00	Kranz 31'; Fuchs 60'; Marschall 80'			Attendance: 14,800; Referee: Hans-Peter Best

5 March 1994 24	Leipzig	2-3	Borussia Dortmund	Zentralstadion, Leipzig
15:30	Heidrich 30'; Anders 81'		Chapuisat 48'; Sippel 73', 74'	Attendance: 18,000; Referee: Aron Schmidhuber

8 March 1994 23	Borussia Dortmund	1-2	Stuttgart	Westfalenstadion, Dortmund
20:00	Chapuisat 68'		Knup 50', 66'	Attendance: 41,517; Referee: Manfred Harder

11 March 1994 25	Borussia Dortmund	2-1	MSV Duisburg	Westfalenstadion, Dortmund
20:00	Ricken 44'; Schulz 63'		Közle 61'	Attendance: 42,800; Referee: Jürgen Aust

20 March 1994 26	Bayern Munich	0-0	Borussia Dortmund	Olympiastadion, Munich
18:00				Attendance: 42,000; Referee: Hartmut Strampe

26 March 1994 27	Borussia Dortmund	2-0	Wattenscheid 09	Westfalenstadion, Dortmund
15:30	Franck 34'; Zorc 80' (pen.)			Attendance: 41,491; Referee: Georg Dardenne

2 April 1994 28	Borussia Dortmund	3-2	Werder Bremen	Westfalenstadion, Dortmund
15:30	Chapuisat 56', 67', 72'		Basler 30'; Bode 81'	Attendance: 42,800; Referee: Herrmann Albrecht

5 April 1994 29	Hamburger SV	0-0	Borussia Dortmund	Volksparkstadion, Hamburg
20:00				Attendance: 33,000; Referee: Bernhard Zerr

8 April 1994 30	Borussia Dortmund	2-1	Köln	Westfalenstadion, Dortmund
20:00	Zorc 40' (pen.); Higl 41' (o.g.)		Higl 22'	Attendance: 42,800; Referee: Aron Schmidhuber

17 April 1994 31	Borussia Mönchengladbach	0-0	Borussia Dortmund	Bökelbergstadion, Mönchengladbach
18:00				Attendance: 34,000; Referee: Hans Scheuerer

23 April 1994 32	Borussia Dortmund	2-0	Eintracht Frankfurt	Westfalenstadion, Dortmund
15:30	Riedle 3'; Tskhadadze 68' (o.g.)			Attendance: 42,800; Referee: Wieland Ziller

30 April 1994 33	Kaiserslautern	2-0	Borussia Dortmund	Fritz-Walter-Stadion, Kaiserslautern
15:30	Kuntz 18' (pen.); Kuka 71'			Attendance: 40,500; Referee: Lutz Michael Fröhlich

7 May 1994 34	Borussia Dortmund	4-1	Nürnberg	Westfalenstadion, Dortmund
15:30	Poschner 13', 58'; Zorc 31'; Chapuisat 87'		Zietsch 33'	Attendance: 42,800; Referee: Hans-Peter Dellwing

=== DFB-Pokal ===
3 August 1993 First round	SV Ludweiler-Warndt	1-4	Borussia Dortmund	Hermann-Neuberger-Stadion, Völklingen
18:30	Tabellion 63'		Reinhardt 24'; Mill 30'; Reuter 33'; Rummenigge 84'	Attendance: 10,500; Referee: Thomas Leimert

24 August 1993 Second round	Borussia Dortmund	0-1	Carl Zeiss Jena	Westfalenstadion, Dortmund
20:00			Schreiber 11'	Attendance: 17,462; Referee: Jürgen Jansen

=== UEFA Cup ===
15 September 1993 First round	Borussia Dortmund (Germany)	0-0	(Russia) Spartak Vladikavkaz	Westfalenstadion, Dortmund
18:45				Attendance: 34,539; Referee: Brian Hill (England)

28 September 1993 First round	Spartak Vladikavkaz (Russia)	0-1	(Germany) Borussia Dortmund	Republican Spartak Stadium, Vladikavkaz
15:30			Chapuisat 61'	Attendance: 28,000; Referee: Ion Crăciunescu (Romania)

20 October 1993 Second round	Maribor (Slovenia)	0-0	(Germany) Borussia Dortmund	Ljudski vrt, Maribor
14:30				Attendance: 10,000; Referee: Anders Frisk (Sweden)

3 November 1993 Second round	Borussia Dortmund (Germany)	2-1	(Slovenia) Maribor	Westfalenstadion, Dortmund
17:00	Chapuisat 48', 52'		Bozgo 21'	Attendance: 25,206; Referee: Piero Ceccarini (Italy)

24 November 1993 Third round	Brøndby (Denmark)	1-1	(Germany) Borussia Dortmund	Brøndby Stadium, Brøndbyvester
18:30	Kristensen 19'		Chapuisat 61'	Attendance: 16,817; Referee: Jorge Coroado (Portugal)

8 November 1993 Third round	Borussia Dortmund (Germany)	1-0	(Denmark) Brøndby	Westfalenstadion, Dortmund
17:45	Zorc 28'			Attendance: 37,815; Referee: Jim McCluskey (Scotland)

1 March 1994 Quarter-finals	Borussia Dortmund (Germany)	1-3	(Italy) Inter Milan	Westfalenstadion, Dortmund
19:30	Schulz 83'		Jonk 33', 36'; Shalimov 90'	Attendance: 36,000; Referee: Mario van der Ende (Netherlands)

17 March 1994 Quarter-finals	Inter Milan (Italy)	1-2	(Germany) Borussia Dortmund	San Siro, Milan
20:30	Manicone 80'		Zorc 38'; Ricken 47'	Attendance: 28,989; Referee: Michel Piraux (Belgium)
