= Stefan Reuter =

German football executive and former player (born 1966)

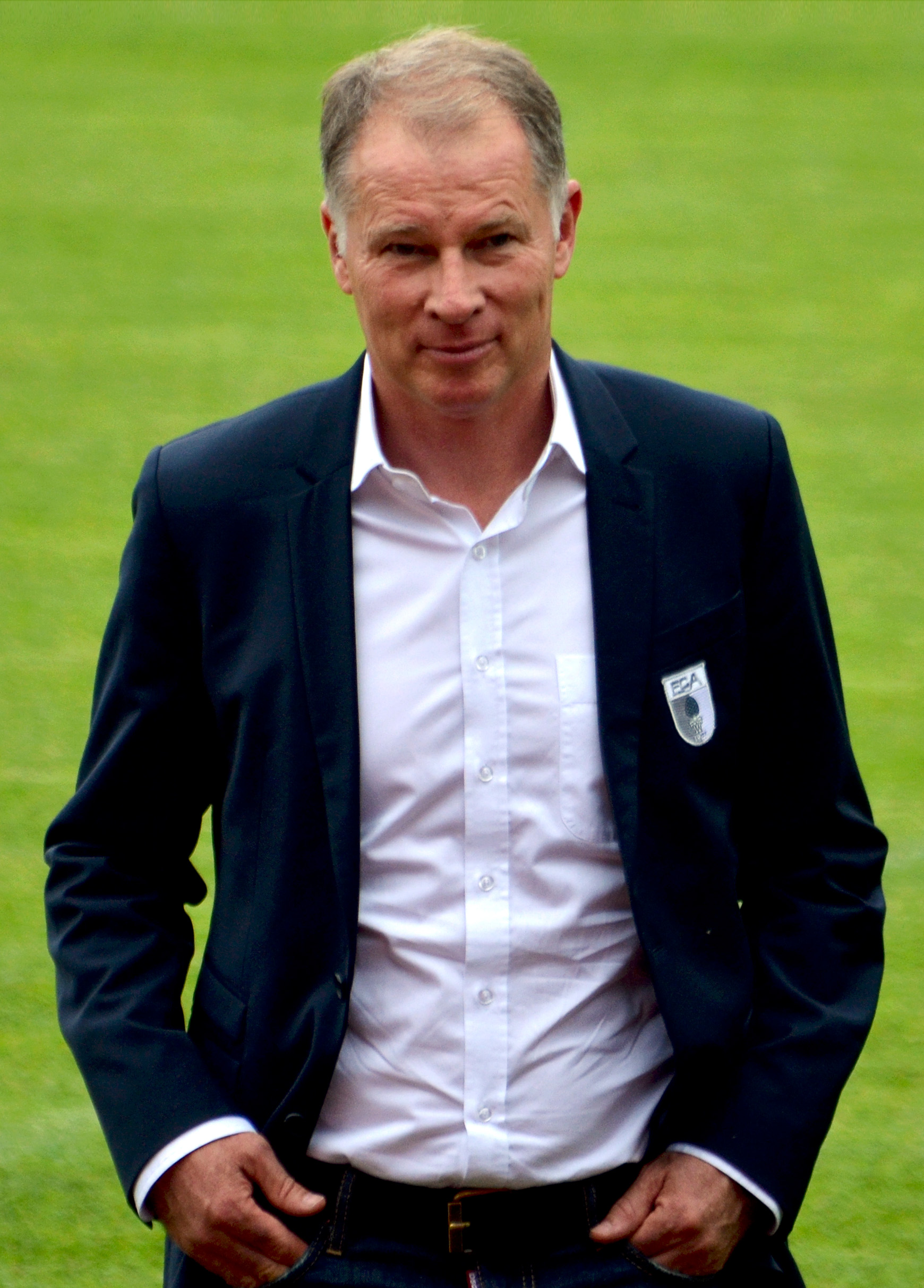
- Reuter in 2016

Personal information
- Date of birth: 16 October 1966 (age 60)
- Place of birth: Dinkelsbühl, West Germany
- Height: 1.81 m (5 ft 11 in)
- Positions: Right midfielder; right-back; defender

Team information
- Current team: FC Augsburg (general manager)

Youth career
- 1971–1982: TSV 1860 Dinkelsbühl
- 1982–1984: 1. FC Nürnberg

Senior career*
Years	Team	Apps	(Gls)
1984–1988	1. FC Nürnberg	125	(13)
1988–1991	Bayern Munich	95	(4)
1991–1992	Juventus	28	(0)
1992–2004	Borussia Dortmund	307	(11)
Total		545	(28)

International career
1985	West Germany U-18		
1987–1998	West Germany/Germany	69	(2)
Medal record
Bayern Munich
Winner	Bundesliga	1989
Runner-up	DFB-Supercup	1989
Winner	Bundesliga	1990
Winner	DFB-Supercup	1990
Borussia Dortmund
Runner-up	UEFA Cup	1993
Winner	Bundesliga	1995
Winner	DFB-Supercup	1995
Winner	Bundesliga	1996
Winner	DFB-Supercup	1996
Winner	UEFA Champions League	1997
Runner-up	UEFA Super Cup	1997
Winner	Intercontinental Cup	1997
Winner	Bundesliga	2002
Runner-up	UEFA Cup	2002
Runner-up	DFB-Ligapokal	2003
Germany
Winner	UEFA Under-16 Championship	1984
Winner	FIFA World Cup	1990
Runner-up	European Championship	1992
Winner	European Championship	1996
- * Club domestic league appearances and goals

Stefan Reuter (born 16 October 1966) is a German football executive and former player who played as a defender or midfielder. He has been the sportvorstand of Bundesliga club FC Augsburg since 2012.

During his playing career, he was included in the West Germany national team which won the 1990 FIFA World Cup and the Germany which won UEFA Euro 1996. He also won the 1996–97 UEFA Champions League with Borussia Dortmund.

== Club career ==
Born in Dinkelsbühl, Reuter started his career with local side TSV 1860 Dinkelsbühl. In 1982, he played for 1. FC Nürnberg, first in the 2. Bundesliga and, from 1985, in the Bundesliga. In exactly 100 games he scored ten goals. He was occasionally used as a right sided midfielder.

In 1988, he was transferred to Bayern Munich. He played 95 games in the Bundesliga and scored four goals for the Bavarians. He won the Bundesliga title with Bayern in 1988–89 and 1989–90.

A proposed move to Liverpool following West Germany's victorious World Cup campaign was turned down at the last minute with Reuter following many of his compatriots to Italy. From 1991 to 1992 he played for Juventus, but soon returned to Germany, joining Borussia Dortmund. With Borussia, Reuter won the Bundesliga in 1994–95, 1995–96 and 2001–02, and the UEFA Champions League in 1996–97. The team also reached the final of the UEFA Cup in both 1993 and 2002. Overall, he played 307 games for Dortmund and scored 11 goals in the Bundesliga before retiring in 2004.

== International career ==
In 1984, Reuter was part of the team that won the U-16 European Championship, held in Germany from 3 to 5 May 1984, after the team had won the group in qualifying and the quarterfinals against the Netherlands. The semi-finals in Heilbronn ended in a 5-1 win over Yugoslavia, and in the final on 5 May in Ulm he secured (as a substitute) with the team the U-16 title by beating the Soviet Union 2-0 -European Champion.

He also played for the U-18 national team (seven times in a row after his debut on 14 January 1985 in Leningrad - as part of the Granatkin memorial tournament - in a 5-1 victory over Poland), as well as for the U-21 National team, for which he made his debut on 24 September 1985 in Eskilstuna in the 1-2 defeat by Sweden and also scored two goals in the process. He also took part in the military world championships in Italy in 1987 with the Bundeswehr national team and finished second. On 18 April 1987, Reuter played for the senior national team for the first time. In the 0-0 draw against Italy in Cologne, his first of 69 appearances began with the substitution of Wolfgang Rolff in the 63rd minute. He scored his first of two international goals on 12 December 1987 in Brasília against Brazil in the 90th minute to a 1-1 draw.

He later won the 1990 World Cup, as well as the Euro 1996. At Euro 1996 he scored one of the penalties in the semi-final shootout against England, however like Andreas Möller he was suspended for the final.

In 1992, Reuter became the first player in the European Championship history to be substituted as a substitute, when during the match between Germany and Scotland, he replaced Karl-Heinz Riedle but then only seven minutes later he had to leave the field due to an injury, and was replaced by Michael Schulz.

His last game was the first round match against the USA, played in Paris on 15 June 1998, which he won 2-0. As a member of the 1990 World Cup football team, he received the Silver Laurel Leaf.

== Managerial career ==
From 1 July 2004 to 3 January 2005, Reuter worked as a management assistant at Borussia Dortmund in the area of sponsorship. Reuter served as team manager for TSV 1860 Munich from January 2006 to 2 February 2009 when he was removed from the job. After the termination without notice of his colleague Stefan Ziffzer, who was responsible for finance, Reuter was the sole managing director for three months from 13 May 2008 until Markus Kern was appointed as additional managing director on 13 August 2008. On 2 February 2009, Miroslav Stević was introduced as the new sports director at TSV 1860. A day later, Reuter rejected an offer to continue working in management with limited skills as unacceptable and was then suspended with immediate effect. His contract expired on 30 June 2009.

On 27 February 2012, he was appointed as general manager of FC Augsburg. Under Reuter's tenure, FC Augsburg qualified for the UEFA Europa League for the first time in the club's history in the 2014/15 season.

Reuter's current contract with FCA runs until 30 June 2026.

== Club statistics ==
Appearances and goals by club, season and competition
Club	Season	League			National Cup		League Cup		Continental		Other		Total	
Club	Season	Division	Apps	Goals	Apps	Goals	Apps	Goals	Apps	Goals	Apps	Goals	Apps	Goals
1. FC Nürnberg	1984–85	2. Bundesliga	25	3	1	0	—		—		—		26	3
1. FC Nürnberg	1985–86	Bundesliga	33	2	2	2	—		—		—		35	4
1. FC Nürnberg	1986–87	Bundesliga	33	6	2	1	—		—		—		35	7
1. FC Nürnberg	1987–88	Bundesliga	34	2	4	0	—		—		—		38	2
1. FC Nürnberg	Total		125	13	9	3	—		—		—		134	16
Bayern Munich	1988–99	Bundesliga	32	0	3	0	—		10	1	—		45	1
Bayern Munich	1989–90	Bundesliga	33	0	3	0	—		8	0	1 (Note: Appearances in the German Super Cup)	0	45	0
Bayern Munich	1990–91	Bundesliga	30	4	1	0	—		8	3	1	1	40	8
Bayern Munich	Total		95	4	7	0	—		26	4	2	1	130	9
Juventus	1991–92	Serie A	28	0	8	0	—		—		—		36	0
Borussia Dortmund	1992–93	Bundesliga	26	0	4	0	—		10	0	—		40	0
Borussia Dortmund	1993–94	Bundesliga	21	0	2	1	—		5	0	—		28	1
Borussia Dortmund	1994–95	Bundesliga	33	4	2	0	—		9	1	—		44	5
Borussia Dortmund	1995–96	Bundesliga	26	6	2	0	—		5	0	1	0	34	6
Borussia Dortmund	1996–97	Bundesliga	27	1	1	1	—		9	1	1	0	38	3
Borussia Dortmund	1997–98	Bundesliga	28	0	2	0	1	0	8	0	1 (Note: Appearance in the Intercontinental Cup)	0	40	0
Borussia Dortmund	1998–99	Bundesliga	25	0	0	0	—		—		—		25	0
Borussia Dortmund	1999–2000	Bundesliga	26	0	1	0	2	0	8	0	—		37	0
Borussia Dortmund	2000–01	Bundesliga	5	0	0	0	—		—		—		5	0
Borussia Dortmund	2001–02	Bundesliga	28	0	0	0	2	0	15	0	—		45	0
Borussia Dortmund	2002–03	Bundesliga	31	0	2	0	0	0	10	0	—		43	0
Borussia Dortmund	2003–04	Bundesliga	31	0	2	0	3	0	6	0	—		42	0
Borussia Dortmund	Total		307	11	18	2	8	0	85	2	3	0	421	15
Career Total			555	28	42	5	8	0	111	6	5	1	721	40

== Honours ==
Borussia Dortmund

- Bundesliga: 1994–95, 1995–96, 2001–02
- DFL-Supercup: 1995, 1996
- UEFA Champions League: 1996–97
- UEFA Cup: runner-up: 1992–93, 2001–02
- Intercontinental Cup: 1997

Bayern Munich

- Bundesliga: 1988–89, 1989–90
- DFL-Supercup: 1990

Juventus

- Serie A: runner-up: 1991–92
- Coppa Italia: runner-up: 1991–92

West Germany, Germany

- FIFA World Cup: 1990
- European Championship: 1996, runner-up 1992

Germany U16

- UEFA European Under-16 Championship: 1984

== Personal life ==
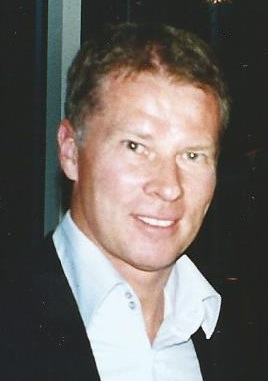
Reuter in 2005

In his youth, Reuter was also a successful track and field athlete. He won district championships in the long jump and was Bavarian champion in cross country running. He retained this basic athletic training as a player. His dynamic sprints earned him the nickname Turbo.

Reuter is a member of the board of trustees of the Stiftung Jugendfußball (youth football foundation) which was founded in 2000 by him, Jürgen Klinsmann, other German national team players and the lecturers of the special Pro Licence course. Reuter was the last active professional from the German 1990 World Cup winning squad.
