= Karl-Heinz Riedle =

German footballer (born 1965)

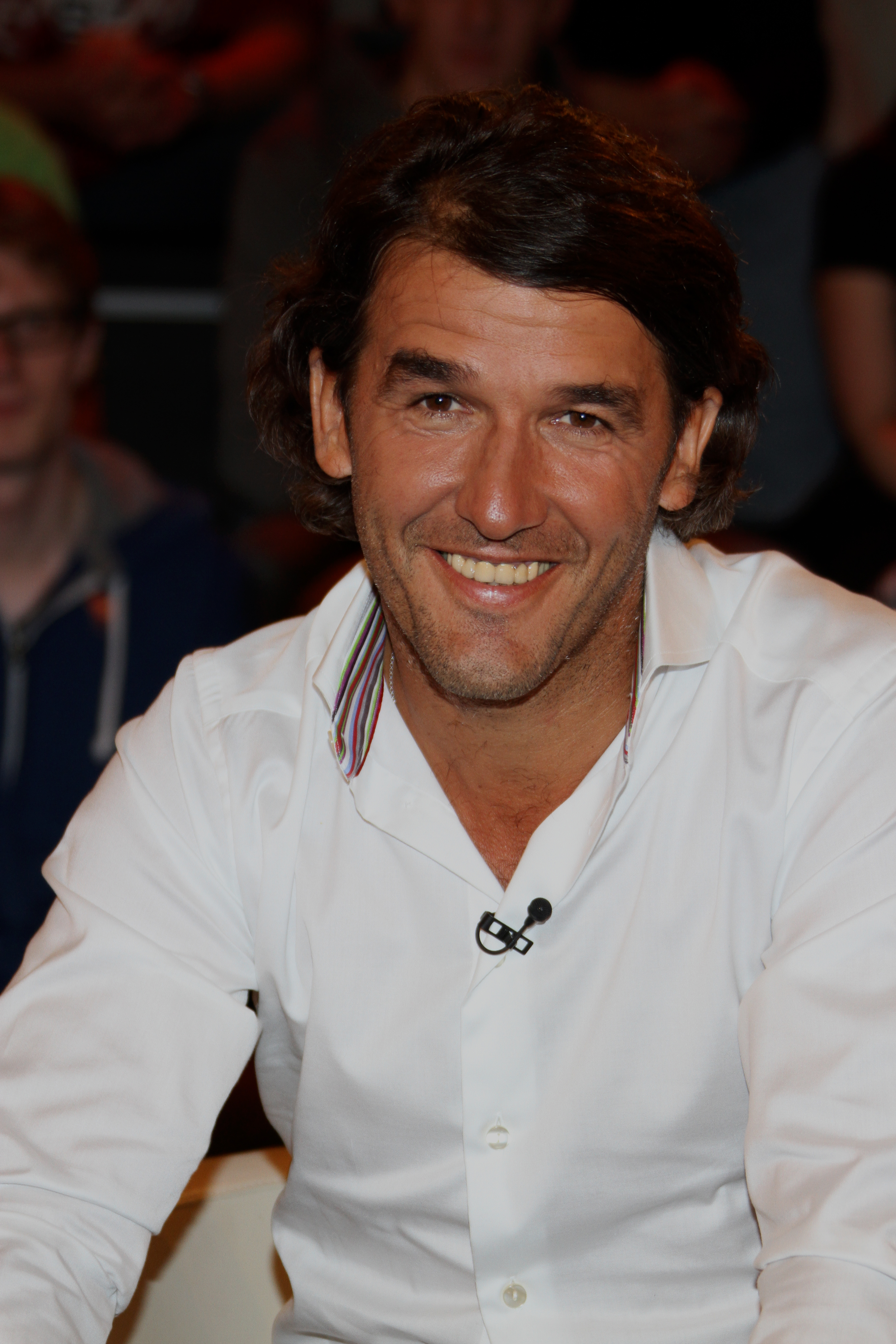
- Riedle in 2012

Personal information
- Date of birth: 16 September 1965 (age 61)
- Place of birth: Weiler im Allgäu, West Germany
- Height: 1.79 m (5 ft 10 in)
- Position: Striker

Youth career
- TSV Ellhofen
- SV Weiler

Senior career*
Years	Team	Apps	(Gls)
1983–1986	FC Augsburg	80	(31)
1986–1987	Blau-Weiß Berlin	34	(10)
1987–1990	Werder Bremen	86	(38)
1990–1993	Lazio	84	(30)
1993–1997	Borussia Dortmund	87	(24)
1997–1999	Liverpool	60	(11)
1999–2001	Fulham	34	(6)
Total		465	(150)

International career
1986–1987	West Germany U21	4	(1)
1988	West Germany Olympic	1	(0)
1988–1994	Germany	42	(16)

Managerial career
- 2000: Fulham
Medal record
Men's football
Representing Germany
FIFA World Cup
Winner	1990 Italy
UEFA European Championship
Runner-up	1992 Sweden
Olympic Games
Bronze medal – third place	1988 Seoul	Team
- * Club domestic league appearances and goals

Karl-Heinz "Kalle" Riedle (German pronunciation: [kaʁlˈhaɪnts ˈʁiːdlə]; born 16 September 1965) is a German former professional footballer who played as a striker.

Despite not being particularly tall, he was nicknamed "Air" throughout his career, due to his notable heading accuracy, jumping and timing skills in the air, as well as his ability to make runs into the box and get on the end of crosses, and made a name for himself as a traditional yet well-rounded and prolific centre forward. He appeared in 207 Bundesliga games over the course of eight seasons, scoring 62 of his 72 goals for Werder Bremen and Borussia Dortmund. He also played for Lazio in Italy and Liverpool in England.

A German international for six years, Riedle represented the country in two World Cups – winning the 1990 edition – and Euro 1992.

== Club career ==
=== Germany ===
Born in Weiler im Allgäu, Swabia, Riedle started his senior career in the Bayernliga with FC Augsburg, being club top scorer in the 1985–86 season with a total of 20 goals. His performances attracted interest from newly promoted Bundesliga side SpVgg Blau-Weiß 1890 Berlin, who signed him for a fee of 33,000 Deutsche Mark; he made his league debut for his new team on 9 August 1986, scoring in a 4–1 home loss against 1. FC Kaiserslautern.

After his team's relegation, as last, Riedle nonetheless signed with SV Werder Bremen, led by legendary Otto Rehhagel, and netted 18 times in his first season (second-best in the league behind Jürgen Klinsmann, and 24 overall) to help the club win the national title. During his three-year spell with the Hanseatic he scored 58 goals all competitions comprised, and appeared in back-to-back German Cup finals, losing both and finding the net in the 1989 edition – opening the score in a 4–1 defeat to Borussia Dortmund.

=== Lazio and return home ===
In the 1990 summer, Riedle moved to S.S. Lazio of Italy for a transfer fee of 13 million DM. During his stint with the Roman the club failed to win any silverware or reach any final, and his best output occurred in the 1991–92 campaign when he scored 13 goals in 29 games for an eventual 10th-place finish in Serie A; for two of his three years, he shared teams with countryman Thomas Doll.

Riedle returned to Germany in 1993 and joined Borussia Dortmund. He was a starter for most of his spell, often partnering Stéphane Chapuisat, but failed to reproduce his previous form, never scoring in double digits; he was however important in the conquest of the 1995 and 1996 national championships (13 goals combined) and, in the 1996–97 UEFA Champions League, netted twice against Juventus in the final for a 3–1 success.

=== England ===
In 1997, Riedle joined Liverpool in the Premier League. He was irregularly used during his stint at Anfield, especially after the phasing-in of 18-year-old Michael Owen.

In late September 1999, 34-year-old Riedle moved to Fulham where, along with his old Liverpool manager Roy Evans, he would serve as caretaker manager until the end of 1999–2000 after Paul Bracewell's dismissal. Before the end of the following season – where he eventually netted once from 14 appearances to help Fulham to top flight promotion – he announced his retirement.

== International career ==
Riedle made his debut for West Germany on 31 August 1988, playing 15 minutes against Finland and scoring in a 4–0 away win for the 1990 World Cup qualifiers. Selected by coach Franz Beckenbauer for the finals in Italy as a backup to Klinsmann and Rudi Völler, he contributed with four games as the national team won its third title, starting once due to suspension to the latter. In the semi-final against England Völler limped off injured in the first half and Riedle came on as a substitute. The match went to penalties and Riedle converted his attempt as Germany eventually prevailed. However Völler recovered to start the final and Riedle remained on the bench.

One of Riedle's most memorable matches for Germany came during the UEFA Euro 1992 semi-final against Sweden, in which he netted two goals in a 3–2 triumph, eventually being the tournament's joint-top scorer. He gained a total of 42 caps, scoring on 16 occasions.

== Personal life ==
Riedle married Gabriele and fathered three children, Alessandro, who is also a professional footballer, Dominic and Vivien-Joana. He owned a hotel and ran a football academy, in the village of Oberstaufen.

On 28 August 2014, UEFA announced Riedle as the ambassador of the upcoming Champions League final, which was later held in Berlin. He was later named as the ambassador for Borussia Dortmund in the 2024 edition of the tournament final, alongside Real Madrid legend Zinedine Zidane.

== Career statistics ==
=== Club ===
Appearances and goals by club, season and competition
Club	Season	League			National Cup		League Cup		Continental		Other		Total	
Club	Season	Division	Apps	Goals	Apps	Goals	Apps	Goals	Apps	Goals	Apps	Goals	Apps	Goals
Blau-Weiß 1890 Berlin	1986–87	Bundesliga	34	10	3	4	–		–		–		37	14
Werder Bremen	1987–88	Bundesliga	33	18	6	2	–		10	4	–		49	24
Werder Bremen	1988–89	Bundesliga	33	13	6	5	–		5	1	1 (Note: Appearance in German Supercup)	1	45	20
Werder Bremen	1989–90	Bundesliga	20	7	4	2	–		8	6	–		32	15
Werder Bremen	Total		86	38	16	9	0	0	23	11	1	1	126	59
Lazio	1990–91	Serie A	33	9	2	0	–		–		–		35	9
Lazio	1991–92	Serie A	29	13	4	0	–		–		–		33	13
Lazio	1992–93	Serie A	22	8	4	2	–		–		–		26	10
Lazio	Total		84	30	10	2	0	0	0	0	0	0	94	32
Borussia Dortmund	1993–94	Bundesliga	22	4	0	0	–		5	0	–		27	4
Borussia Dortmund	1994–95	Bundesliga	29	6	2	1	–		9	6	–		40	13
Borussia Dortmund	1995–96	Bundesliga	18	7	0	0	–		4	1	–		22	8
Borussia Dortmund	1996–97	Bundesliga	18	7	0	0	–		5	4	–		23	11
Borussia Dortmund	1997–98	Bundesliga	0	0	0	0	1	0	0	0	–		1	0
Borussia Dortmund	Total		87	24	2	1	1	0	23	11	0	0	113	36
Liverpool	1997–98	Premier League	25	6	1	0	5	0	3	1	–		34	7
Liverpool	1998–99	Premier League	34	5	1	0	1	0	4	1	–		40	6
Liverpool	1999–2000	Premier League	1	0	0	0	1	2	0	0	–		2	2
Liverpool	Total		60	11	2	0	7	2	7	2	0	0	76	15
Fulham	1999–2000	Football League First Division	21	5	1	0	0	0	–		–		22	5
Fulham	2000–01	Football League First Division	14	1	0	0	0	0	–		–		14	1
Fulham	Total		35	6	1	0	0	0	0	0	0	0	36	6
Career total			386	119	34	16	8	2	53	24	1	1	482	162

=== International ===
Appearances and goals by national team and year
National team	Year	Apps	Goals
Germany	1988	1	1
Germany	1989	3	1
Germany	1990	9	1
Germany	1991	5	3
Germany	1992	10	4
Germany	1993	8	5
Germany	1994	6	1
Total		42	16

== International goals ==
No.	Date	Venue	Opponent	Score	Result	Competition
1.	31 August 1988	Helsinki, Finland	Finland	4–0	4–0	1990 FIFA World Cup qualification
2.	26 September 1989	Rotterdam, Netherlands	Netherlands	1–0	1–1	1990 FIFA World Cup qualification
5.	16 October 1991	Nuremberg, Germany	Wales	3–0	4–1	UEFA Euro 1992 qualifying
6.	18 December 1991	Leverkusen, Germany	Luxembourg	3–0	4–0	UEFA Euro 1992 qualifying
7.	15 June 1992	Norrköping, Sweden	Scotland	1–0	2–0	UEFA Euro 1992
8.	21 June 1992	Solna, Sweden	Sweden	2–0	3–2	UEFA Euro 1992
9.	21 June 1992	Solna, Sweden	Sweden	3–1	3–2	UEFA Euro 1992
10.	13 June 1993	Chicago, United States	United States	2–1	4–3	1993 U.S. Cup
11.	13 June 1993	Chicago, United States	United States	3–1	4–3	1993 U.S. Cup
12.	13 June 1993	Chicago, United States	United States	4–1	4–3	1993 U.S. Cup
16.	27 June 1994	Dallas, United States	South Korea	2–0	3–2	1994 FIFA World Cup

== Honours ==
Werder Bremen

- Bundesliga: 1987–88
- DFB-Supercup: 1988
- DFB-Pokal runner-up: 1988–89, 1989–90

Borussia Dortmund

- Bundesliga: 1994–95, 1995–96
- DFB-Supercup: 1995, 1996
- UEFA Champions League: 1996–97

Fulham

- Football League First Division: 2000–01

Germany

- FIFA World Cup: 1990
- UEFA European Championship runner-up: 1992
- Summer Olympic Games bronze medal: 1988
- US Cup: 1993

Individual

- UEFA Cup top-scorer: 1990 (joint)
- UEFA European Championship top-scorer 1992 (joint)
