= Lars Ricken =

German footballer

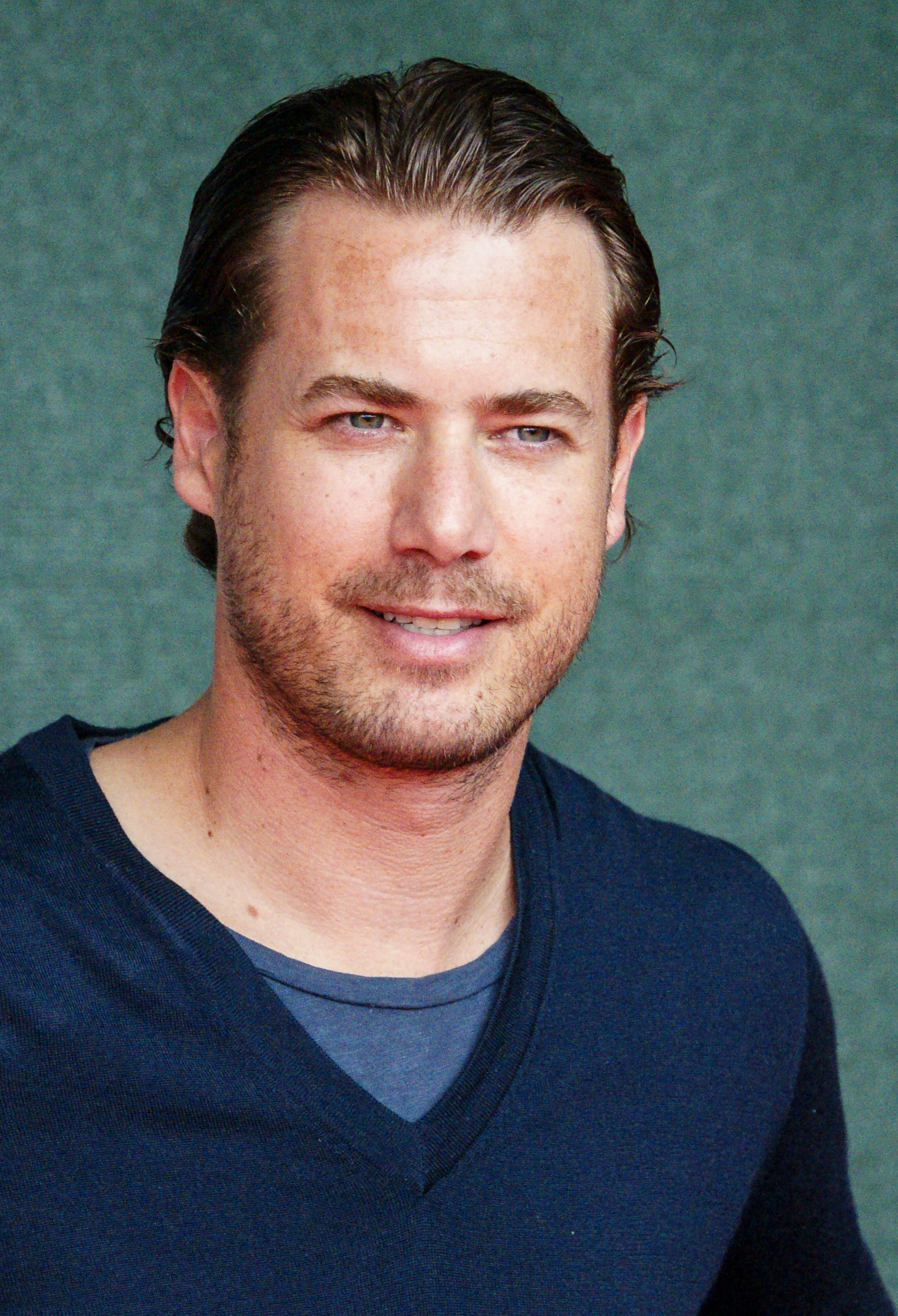
- Ricken in 2014

Personal information
- Full name: Lars Ricken
- Date of birth: 10 July 1976 (age 50)
- Place of birth: Dortmund, West Germany
- Height: 1.78 m (5 ft 10 in)
- Position: Midfielder

Team information
- Current team: Borussia Dortmund (CEO for Sport)

Youth career
- 1982–1986: TuS Eving-Lindenhorst
- 1986–1990: Eintracht Dortmund
- 1990–1993: Borussia Dortmund

Senior career*
Years	Team	Apps	(Gls)
1993–2007	Borussia Dortmund	301	(49)
2003–2009	Borussia Dortmund II	39	(8)
Total		340	(57)

International career
1995–1998	Germany U21	17	(8)
1997–2002	Germany	16	(1)
Medal record
Men's football
Representing Germany
FIFA World Cup
Runner-up	2002 Korea/Japan
- * Club domestic league appearances and goals

Lars Ricken (born 10 July 1976) is a German retired footballer and the current managing director of Borussia Dortmund. From 2008 to 2024, he was the youth coordinator at Dortmund.

Ricken represented Borussia Dortmund throughout his entire professional career, which spanned 15 years. He was the youngest player to appear for the club in an official match, a record later broken by Nuri Şahin. An attacking midfielder, he won three Bundesliga titles (1994–95, 1995–96, 2001–02) and scored in the 1996–97 Champions League final, which Dortmund won.

A German international for five years, Ricken represented the country at the 2002 World Cup and the 1999 Confederations Cup.

== Career ==
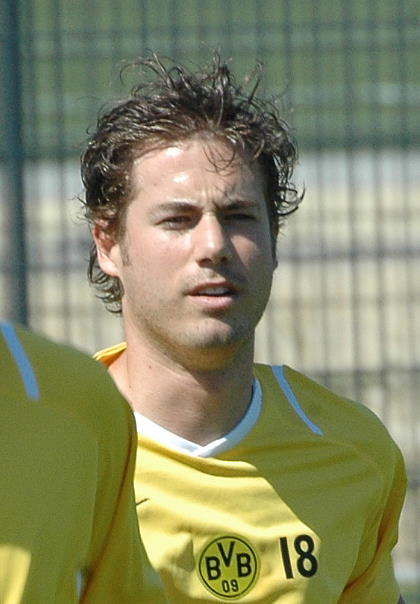
Ricken training with Borussia Dortmund in 2006

Born in Dortmund, Ricken joined local Borussia at an early age and made his Bundesliga debut on 8 March 1994 in a 1–2 home defeat against VfB Stuttgart, aged not yet 18. From the following season onward, he became a regular.

Ricken scored a memorable long-distance goal in the final of the 1996–97 UEFA Champions League edition against Juventus FC, which stood as the fastest goal in a final of the competition by a substitute, finding the net after just 16 seconds on the field. He also contributed 8 goals in 47 matches in the team’s back-to-back national titles (1994–96).

In the following years, Ricken’s success was hampered by a series of injuries. He earned his first cap for Germany on 10 September 1997, in a 1998 FIFA World Cup qualifier against Armenia, but missed that major international tournament as well as UEFA Euro 2000. Later, he restored his form, helping Dortmund claim the league title in 2002 by scoring a career-best six goals and being selected by national coach Rudi Völler for the squad at that year's World Cup; he did not play in the competition, however, as Germany finished runners-up.

Ricken’s injury woes returned after the World Cup and, as a consequence, he failed to earn recognition at either the European or international level. In early April 2007, he was demoted to the reserve team by manager Thomas Doll due to substandard performance.

In November 2007, Ricken announced his retirement from football. In an attempt to return to the sport, he briefly attended a training camp in February 2008 with the Columbus Crew of the Major League Soccer, but returned to Germany and Dortmund after a few days.

On 11 June 2008, Borussia Dortmund sport director Michael Zorc, also a former club footballer, announced that Ricken was to be hired as youth coordinator with immediate effect, while still appearing for the amateur side in the Regionalliga West. However, on 16 February 2009, he announced his retirement from professional football.

On 22 April 2024, Ricken was announced to take over the duties of CEO for Sport at Borussia Dortmund from Hans-Joachim Watzke, beginning on 1 May 2024.

== Career statistics ==
Appearances and goals by club, season and competition
Club	Season	League			Cup		League Cup		Continental		Other		Total	
Club	Season	Division	Apps	Goals	Apps	Goals	Apps	Goals	Apps	Goals	Apps	Goals	Apps	Goals
Borussia Dortmund	1993–94	Bundesliga	5	1	0	0	—		2 (Note: Appearances in the UEFA Cup.)	1	—		7	2
Borussia Dortmund	1994–95	Bundesliga	21	2	0	0	—		7	1	—		28	3
Borussia Dortmund	1995–96	Bundesliga	26	6	3	1	—		7 (Note: Appearances in the UEFA Champions League.)	2	—		36	9
Borussia Dortmund	1996–97	Bundesliga	23	2	1	0	—		9	4	1 (Note: Appearances in the German Super Cup.)	0	34	6
Borussia Dortmund	1997–98	Bundesliga	25	2	2	3	2	0	5	0	2 (Note: Appearances in the UEFA Super Cup.)	0	36	5
Borussia Dortmund	1998–99	Bundesliga	28	5	2	0	—		—		—		30	5
Borussia Dortmund	1999–2000	Bundesliga	29	4	1	0	2	0	11 (Note: Appearances in the UEFA Champions League and UEFA Cup.)	0	—		43	4
Borussia Dortmund	2000–01	Bundesliga	29	6	3	1	—		—		—		32	7
Borussia Dortmund	2001–02	Bundesliga	28	6	1	0	2	0	15	4	—		46	10
Borussia Dortmund	2002–03	Bundesliga	24	4	1	0	1	1	11	0	—		37	5
Borussia Dortmund	2003–04	Bundesliga	23	2	2	0	2	0	5	2	—		32	4
Borussia Dortmund	2004–05	Bundesliga	17	5	1	0	—		2 (Note: Appearances in the UEFA Intertoto Cup.)	0	—		20	5
Borussia Dortmund	2005–06	Bundesliga	10	4	1	0	—		—		—		11	4
Borussia Dortmund	2006–07	Bundesliga	13	0	1	0	—		—		—		14	0
Borussia Dortmund	Total		301	49	19	5	8	1	74	14	3	0	405	69
Borussia Dortmund II	2002–03	Regionalliga Nord	1	0	—		—		—		—		1	0
Borussia Dortmund II	2003–04	Regionalliga Nord	1	0	—		—		—		—		1	0
Borussia Dortmund II	2004–05	Regionalliga Nord	4	2	—		—		—		—		4	2
Borussia Dortmund II	2006–07	Regionalliga Nord	11	5	—		—		—		—		11	5
Borussia Dortmund II	2007–08	Regionalliga Nord	19	1	—		—		—		—		19	1
Borussia Dortmund II	2008–09	Regionalliga West	3	0	—		—		—		—		3	0
Borussia Dortmund II	Total		39	8	—		—		—		—		39	8
Career Total			340	57	19	5	8	1	74	14	3	0	444	77

== Honours ==
Borussia Dortmund

- Bundesliga: 1994–95, 1995–96, 2001–02
- DFB-Supercup: 1995, 1996
- UEFA Champions League: 1996–97
- Intercontinental Cup: 1997
- UEFA Cup runner-up: 2002

Germany

- FIFA World Cup runner-up: 2002

== See also ==
- List of one-club men
