= Júlio César (footballer, born 1963) =

Brazilian footballer

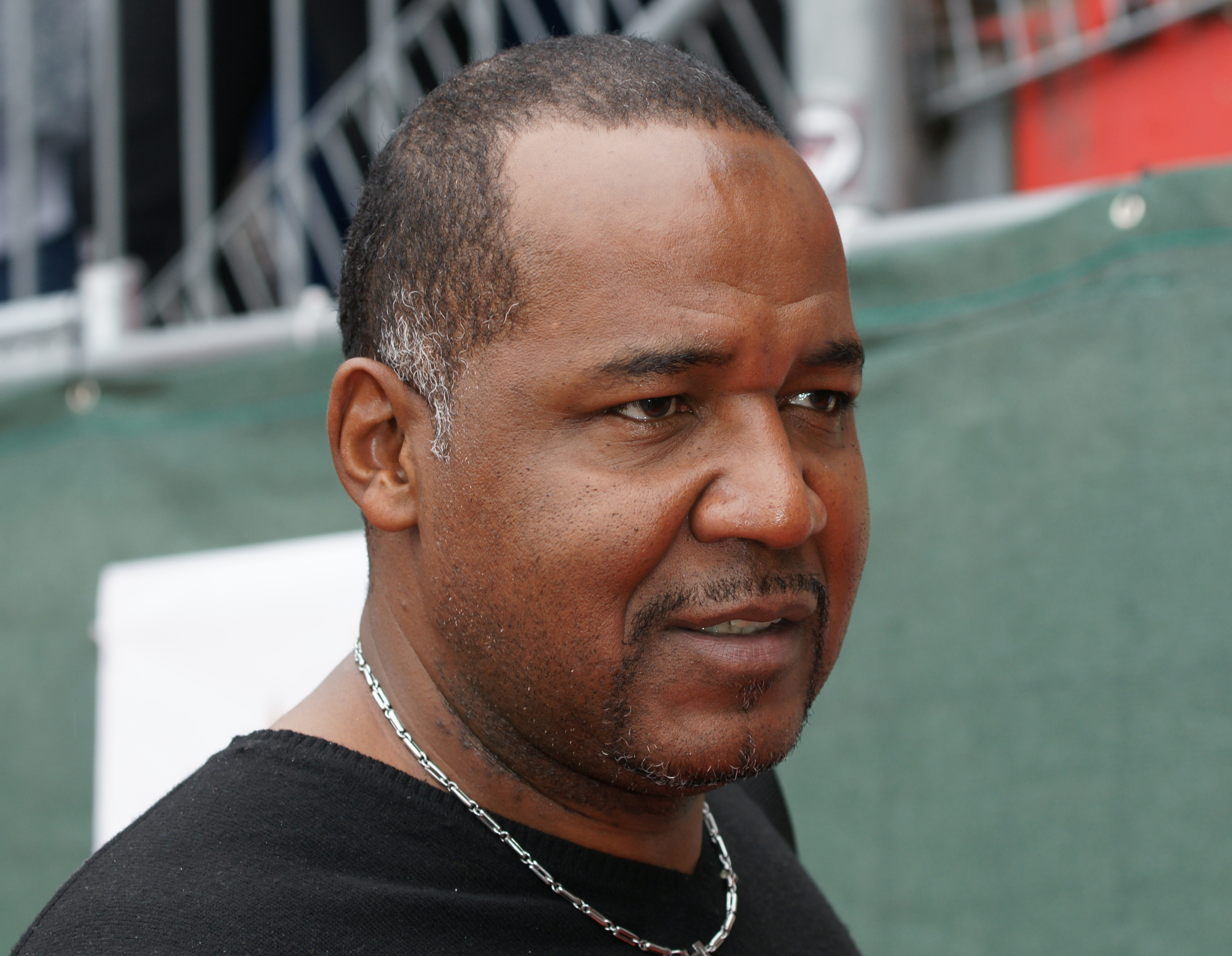
- Júlio César in 2014

Personal information
- Full name: Júlio César da Silva
- Date of birth: 8 March 1963 (age 63)
- Place of birth: Bauru, Brazil
- Height: 1.89 m (6 ft 2 in)
- Position: Centre-back

Youth career
- –1978: Noroeste Bauru

Senior career*
Years	Team	Apps	(Gls)
1979–1986	Guarani	54	(3)
1986–1987	Brest	32	(1)
1987–1990	Montpellier	93	(10)
1990–1994	Juventus	89	(3)
1994–1999	Borussia Dortmund	80	(7)
1998	→ Botafogo (loan)	16	(0)
1999	→ Panathinaikos (loan)	3	(0)
1999–2000	Werder Bremen	12	(0)
2001	Rio Branco		
Total		379	(24)

International career
1986–1993	Brazil	13	(0)
- * Club domestic league appearances and goals

Júlio César da Silva (born 8 March 1963), usually known as Júlio César, is a Brazilian former professional footballer who played as a centre-back. Throughout his career, he played with multiple teams in Brazil and Europe, and also represented the Brazil national team at the 1986 FIFA World Cup, and at the 1987 Copa América.

== Club career ==
Born in Bauru, São Paulo, Júlio César began his career in 1979 with Brazilian club Guarani. He moved to Europe in 1986, after a successful World Cup in Mexico, spending a season with French club Brest. The following season, he played for Montpellier, where he remained for three seasons, winning the Coupe de France during his final season with the team.

He moved to Italian club Juventus in 1990, in an attempt to strengthen the club's fragile defence, making his Serie A debut on 9 September 1990, in a 2–1 away win over Parma. He remained in Turin until 1994, although, despite some solid performances, his time with the club was largely unsuccessful; his only trophy with Juventus was the UEFA Cup, which he won in 1993, under Giovanni Trapattoni. In total, he made 125 appearances for Juventus, scoring six goals, two of which came in European Competitions, and three of which came during his 91 Serie A appearances.

In 1994, he was purchased by German club Borussia Dortmund, where he immediately won consecutive Bundesliga and DFL-Supercup titles, during his first two seasons with the team, as well as the UEFA Champions League and the Intercontinental Cup in 1997 (though he missed the final of the former through injury). He remained with the club until 1999, apart from loans to Brazilian club Botafogo in 1998, and Greek club Panathinaikos in 1999. Later that year, he joined Werder Bremen for the 1999–2000 Bundesliga season, before moving back to Brazil once again, to play for Rio Branco, in 2001, where he retired.

== International career ==
Júlio César played 13 official matches for the Brazil national team, from April 1986 to June 1993; he made his debut on 8 April 1986, in a 3–0 home win over East Germany. He also played for Brazil against "The Rest of the World" in 1989 and for "The Rest of the World" against Brazil in 1990.

He played for Brazil at the 1986 FIFA World Cup in Mexico and won the Best Central Defender Award, being elected to the team of the tournament. At the tournament, he missed a penalty against France in the quarter-final in Guadalajara. With the penalty-shootout tied at 3–3, after Michel Platini had shot his spot kick over the bar, Cesar stepped up for Brazil but hit the left post. Luis Fernández converted the next penalty and subsequently won the match for France. The following year, he also represented Brazil at the 1987 Copa América.

== Style of play ==
Júlio César was known for his strength, speed, and aerial ability, as well as his positioning, tackling, and reading of a game. He was a fast, versatile, and powerful defender with good passing range. He was also capable of playing as a sweeper, a position which allowed him to contribute to his teams' attacks, and make runs into the opponent's half, as well as playing in midfield; he was also an accurate set-piece and penalty kick taker, possessing a powerful shot from distance, which made him an additional offensive threat.

== Career statistics ==
=== Club ===
Appearances and goals by club, season and competition
Club	Season	League			National cup		Continental		Other		Total	
Club	Season	Division	Apps	Goals	Apps	Goals	Apps	Goals	Apps	Goals	Apps	Goals
Guarani	1980	Série A										
Guarani	1981	Série B										
Guarani	1982	Série A	17	2							17	2
Guarani	1983	Série A	11	0							11	0
Guarani	1984	Série B	8	0							8	0
Guarani	1985	Série A	18	1							18	1
Guarani	1986	Série A										
Guarani	Total		54	3							54	3
Brest	1986–87	French Division 1	32	1							32	1
Montpellier	1987–88	French Division 1	37	5							37	5
Montpellier	1988–89	French Division 1	26	1			2	0			28	1
Montpellier	1989–90	French Division 1	30	4							30	4
Montpellier	Total		93	10			2	0			95	10
Juventus	1990–91	Serie A	29	1	4	0	8	2	1 (Note: Appearance in Supercoppa Italiana)	0	42	3
Juventus	1991–92	Serie A	33	1	7	1	0	0	0	0	40	2
Juventus	1992–93	Serie A	16	1	3	0	7	0	0	0	26	1
Juventus	1993–94	Serie A	11	0	2	0	4	0	0	0	17	1
Juventus	Total		89	3	16	1	19	2	1	0	125	6
Borussia Dortmund	1994–95	Bundesliga	25	1	2	1	10	1	0	0	37	3
Borussia Dortmund	1995–96	Bundesliga	23	2	3	0	6	0	1 (Note: Appearance in DFB-Supercup)	1	33	3
Borussia Dortmund	1996–97	Bundesliga	10	3	1	0	4	0	0	0	15	3
Borussia Dortmund	1997–98	Bundesliga	17	1	0	0	7	0	2 (Note: One appearance in DFB-Ligapokal, one appearance in FIFA Club World Cup)	0	26	1
Borussia Dortmund	1998–99	Bundesliga	5	0	0	0	0	0	0	0	5	0
Borussia Dortmund	Total		80	7	6	1	27	1	3	1	116	10
Botafogo (loan)	1998	Série A	16	0							16	0
Panathinaikos (loan)	1998–99	Alpha Ethniki	3	0							3	0
Werder Bremen	1999–2000	Bundesliga	12	0	2	0	6	0	0	0	20	0
Rio Branco	2001	Série C										
Career total			379	24	24	2	54	3	4	1	461	30

=== International ===
Appearances and goals by national team and year
National team	Year	Apps	Goals
Brazil	1986	6	0
Brazil	1987	3	0
Brazil	1988	0	0
Brazil	1989	1	0
Brazil	1990	0	0
Brazil	1991	1	0
Brazil	1992	0	0
Brazil	1993	2	0
Total		13	0

== Honours ==
Montpellier

- Coupe de France: 1989–90

Juventus

- UEFA Cup : 1992–93

Borussia Dortmund

- Bundesliga; 1994–95, 1995–96
- UEFA Champions League: 1996–97
- Intercontinental Cup: 1997
- DFL-Supercup: 1995

Individual

- FIFA World Cup All-Star Team: 1986
- kicker Bundesliga-best defender: 1995
- FIFA XI: 1999
