= Alessandro Riedle =

German footballer (born 1991)

Personal information
- Date of birth: 14 August 1991 (age 35)
- Place of birth: Lindenberg im Allgäu, Germany
- Height: 1.79 m (5 ft 10 in)
- Position: Striker

Youth career
- 1998–1999: Liverpool
- 1999–2001: Fulham
- 2001–2009: Grasshoppers

Senior career*
Years	Team	Apps	(Gls)
2009	Grasshoppers	10	(3)
2009–2010	VfB Stuttgart II	15	(1)
2010–2011	Grasshoppers	8	(0)
2011–2013	AC Bellinzona	42	(3)
2013–2014	Akhisar Belediyespor	3	(0)
2014–2015	Viktoria Köln	1	(0)
2015–2020	SC Brühl		
2020–2021	FC Wangen bei Olten		

International career
2009–2010	Germany U18	2	(0)
- * Club domestic league appearances and goals

Alessandro Riedle (born 14 August 1991) is a German former professional footballer who played as a striker. He is the son of former Germany international Karl-Heinz Riedle.

== Early years ==
Riedle started playing football in 1998 with the Liverpool F.C. Academy and switched in summer 1999 to Fulham along with his father Karl-Heinz. In May 2001, after the retirement of his father he left Fulham and England to move to Swiss Grasshopper Club Zürich.

== Club career ==
Riedle started his professional career with Grasshopper Club Zürich, making his first appearance on 11 March 2009 in the Swiss Super League against Neuchâtel Xamax. On 4 June 2009, Riedle signed a two-year contract with VfB Stuttgart. On 25 August 2010, Riedle returned to Grasshoppers. On 5 August 2013, Riedle signed a two-year contract with Süper Lig side Akhisar Belediyespor. Although his time in Turkey did not go well as he was only capped as a substitute for three times.

In September 2014, Riedle joined German fourth-tier club Viktoria Köln. In February 2015, after only earning a single cap in five months, he left Köln again and returned to Switzerland, where he had spent almost a decade of his youth. He joined third-tier club SC Brühl in St. Gallen.

== International career ==
Riedle is a former member of the Germany U18 national team.

== Personal life ==
He is the son of former Germany international Karl-Heinz Riedle. He attended St Peter's Primary school in Heswall, Wirral.
