= Burkhard Segler =

German footballer

Personal information
- Full name: Burkhard Segler
- Date of birth: 5 March 1951 (age 75)
- Place of birth: Oberhausen, West Germany
- Position: Midfielder

Senior career*
Years	Team	Apps	(Gls)
1970–1972	Bayer 04 Leverkusen		
1972–1973	VfL Osnabrück	32	(24)
1973	FC Bayern Munich	0	(0)
1973–1979	Borussia Dortmund	146	(27)
1979–1982	SCB Viktoria Köln	61	(12)
1982–1983	Rot-Weiß Oberhausen	32	(12)
1983–1984	1. FC Bocholt	14	(6)
1984–1985	SuS Hüsten 09		
Total		285	(81)

International career
1977	West Germany B	1	(0)
- * Club domestic league appearances and goals

Burkhard Segler (born 5 March 1951 in Oberhausen) is a retired German footballer who made a total of 88 appearances in the Fußball-Bundesliga during his playing career.

Segler played one game for the Germany national football B team on 22 February 1977 in Orléans, France, where they lost 1–0.
