= Mallam Yahaya =

Ghanaian footballer (born 1974)

Personal information
- Date of birth: 31 December 1974 (age 51)
- Place of birth: Kumasi, Ghana
- Height: 1.82 m (6 ft 0 in)
- Positions: Midfielder; forward

Youth career
- 1985–1989: Kwabre Stars
- 1989–1991: Kaloum Stars
- 1991–1993: King Faisal Babes
- 1993–1994: Torino

Senior career*
Years	Team	Apps	(Gls)
1994–1997	Borussia Dortmund	5	(0)
1996–2000	Waldhof Mannheim	46	(9)
1997–1998	→ Stuttgarter Kickers (loan)	7	(0)
2000–2001	VfR Mannheim	46	(9)
2005–2006	FC Astoria Walldorf		
2006–2007	Ghana United		

International career
1995–2000	Ghana	12	(1)

Managerial career
- 2016–2017: New Edubiase United
- * Club domestic league appearances and goals

Mallam Yahaya (born 31 December 1974) is a Ghanaian football manager and former player who played as a midfielder or forward. He made 12 appearances for the Ghana national team scoring once.

== International career ==
Yahaya was member of the Ghana national team at the 1996 Summer Olympics in Atlanta.

== Managerial career ==
Following spells as coach of Nzema Kotoko and King Faisal Babies, Yahaya was announced as manager of New Edubiase United in November 2016. He resigned in May 2017.
