= Thomas Franck (footballer) =

German footballer

Personal information
- Full name: Thomas Franck
- Date of birth: 24 February 1971 (age 55)
- Place of birth: Heppenheim, West Germany
- Height: 1.83 m (6 ft 0 in)
- Position: Midfielder

Youth career
- Waldhof Mannheim

Senior career*
Years	Team	Apps	(Gls)
1988–1990	Waldhof Mannheim	19	(2)
1990–1996	Borussia Dortmund	104	(2)
1996–1998	1. FC Kaiserslautern	15	(2)
1999–2000	Waldhof Mannheim	1	(0)
2000–2002	Darmstadt 98	8	(0)
2002–2004	Germania Pfungstadt		
Total		147	(6)

International career
1990–1992	Germany U21	7	(1)
1990–1992	Germany Olympic	4	(1)
- * Club domestic league appearances and goals

Thomas Franck (born 24 February 1971) is a German former professional footballer who played as a midfielder.

== Football career ==
Franck was born in Heppenheim. He made his professional debuts with SV Waldhof Mannheim on 12 May 1989 at the age of 18, playing 12 minutes in a 3–4 home loss against VfB Stuttgart, with the club then in the Bundesliga (it would be his only appearance of the season, and he played in 18 matches more the following campaign, which ended in relegation).

In the 1990 summer, he moved to Borussia Dortmund, helping to the club's domestic consolidation in his first seasons, and also contributing with five matches in its 1992–93 UEFA Cup runner-up run, scoring in a 7–2 home drubbing of Floriana FC in the first round. He was, however, only a fringe player when the team won back-to-back national championships (only 20 matches combined), leaving the club in June 1996.

Franck subsequently signed for 1. FC Kaiserslautern, winning consecutive league titles, one in each of the two major levels. In the 1997–98 topflight campaign, however, he appeared in no matches, due to injuries. In the following years, he appeared with three teams in different divisions – including former side Waldhof – with no impact whatsoever (he was also sidelined for the entirety of 1998–99), finally retiring from football at the age of 33.

== Honours ==
Borussia Dortmund

- Bundesliga: 1994–95, 1995–96
- UEFA Cup: runner-up 1992–93

1. FC Kaiserslautern

- Bundesliga: 1997–98
- 2. Bundesliga: 1996–97
