= Michael Schulz =

German footballer

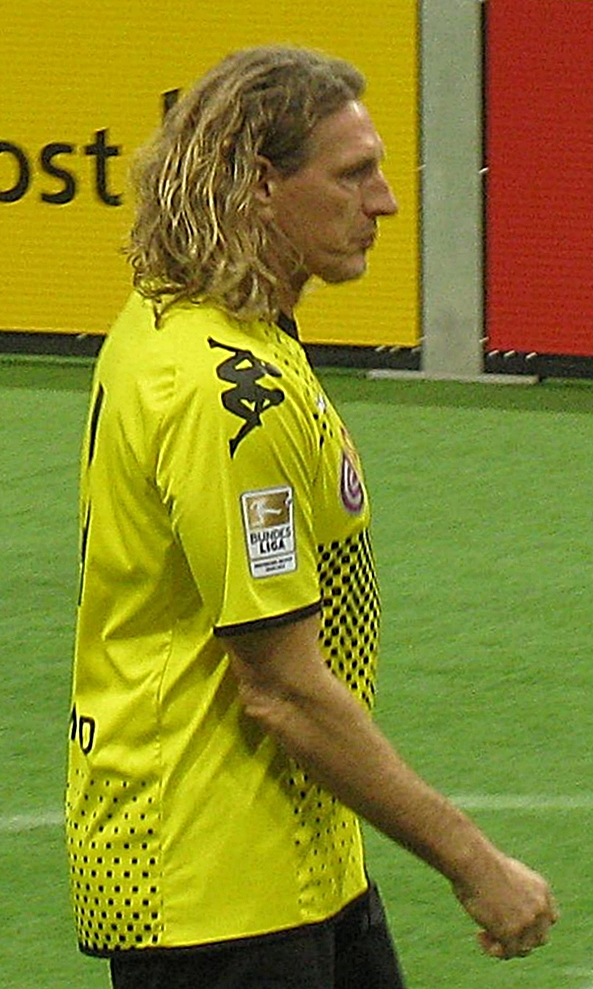
- Schulz playing for a Borussia Dortmund veterans team

Personal information
- Date of birth: 3 September 1961 (age 65)
- Place of birth: Witten, West Germany
- Height: 1.94 m (6 ft 4 in)
- Position: Centre-back

Youth career
- 1967–1972: TuS Nettlingen
- 1972–1980: TuS Sulingen
- 1980–1984: TuS Syke

Senior career*
Years	Team	Apps	(Gls)
1984–1987	VfB Oldenburg		
1987–1989	1. FC Kaiserslautern	51	(3)
1989–1994	Borussia Dortmund	133	(4)
1994–1997	Werder Bremen	59	(1)
Total		243	(8)

International career
1988	West Germany Olympic	7	(0)
1992–1993	Germany	7	(0)
Medal record
Borussia Dortmund
Winner	DFB-Supercup	1989
Runner-up	UEFA Cup	1993
Werder Bremen
Winner	DFB-Supercup	1994
Germany
Bronze medal – third place	Olympics	1988
Runner-up	European Championship	1992
- * Club domestic league appearances and goals

Michael Schulz (born 3 September 1961) is a German former professional footballer who played as a central defender. He played 243 matches in the Bundesliga for Borussia Dortmund, Werder Bremen and 1. FC Kaiserslautern and scored eight goals.

== Club career ==
Schulz was born in Witten. He had the reputation of being one of the hardest defenders in the Bundesliga. He collected 48 yellow and 2 red cards. He was a favourite at Borussia Dortmund and Werder Bremen, his fans regularly chanting "Schuuuuuuuuuulz" whenever he had the ball. Fellow Bremen player Christian Schulz and fellow Dortmund player Nico Schulz, who bear no relationship to him, were regularly celebrated like this because of him. In Panini's World Championship collector's cards edition 1994 he is described as "an anchor as header, strong in duels, feared for his wide throw-ins. The Charles Bronson type of guy overdoes toughness." Michael Schulz made nearly 250 (West) German top-flight appearances.

== International career ==
He played seven times for the Germany national team from 1992 to 1993. He also competed for West Germany at the 1988 Summer Olympics.

== Post-playing career ==
Schulz works as a player agent at the Hamburg-based sport management agency Extratime. He's additionally in the field for several German TV channels and since August 2009 also as a field reporter for Deutsche Telekom's football channel Liga total.

== "Curse" of Michael Schulz ==
Although Schulz was regarded as one of the best defenders of his generation, top titles eluded him. The special sting in his case was that each team he played for was highly successful after he was transferred away, leading to speculation he was cursed.

- 1. FC Kaiserslautern (1987–1989): in this period, FCK was a scrub team which constantly flirted with relegation. After Schulz was shipped away, FCK won the German Cup in 1990 and the German Championship in 1991.
- Borussia Dortmund (1989–1994): BVB was a midfield team when Schulz was there. But then, Schulz feuded with Matthias Sammer and was sent away, just before BVB won two German Championships in 1995 and 1996 and the UEFA Champions League in 1997.
- Werder Bremen (1994–1997): Schulz joined Bremen just after Werder had won two German Championships and the German Cup. During his period, Werder suffered a drought and won nothing, apart from the 1994 DFB-Supercup. However, in 1999, Werder won the German Cup again after Schulz had left.

In a 1997 issue of the German football magazine kicker, published when Schulz announced his retirement, he was asked in the column Mal ehrlich (Now, seriously), whether Bremen, now that Schulz was stopping, would finally win something. He answered, "This is a sure-fire tip! I'd bet on it anytime", acknowledging the existence of his jinx.

== Honours ==
Borussia Dortmund

- DFL-Supercup: 1989
- UEFA Cup finalist: 1992–93

Werder Bremen

- DFL-Supercup: 1994

West Germany Olympic

- Olympic bronze medal: 1988

Germany

- UEFA European Championship runner-up: 1992
- 1993 U.S. Cup
