= 1995 DFB-Supercup =

- Match programme cover
| Borussia Dortmund | Borussia Mönchengladbach |
| 1 | 0 |
- Date: 5 August 1995
- Venue: Rheinstadion, Düsseldorf
- Referee: Markus Merk (Kaiserslautern)
- Attendance: 40,000

The 1995 DFB-Supercup, known as the Panasonic DFB-Supercup for sponsorship purposes, was the ninth DFB-Supercup, an annual football match contested by the winners of the previous season's Bundesliga and DFB-Pokal competitions.

The match was played at the Rheinstadion, Düsseldorf, and contested by league champions Borussia Dortmund and cup winners Borussia Mönchengladbach. Dortmund won 1–0 to secure their second Supercup title.

== Teams ==
| Team | Qualification | Previous appearances (bold indicates winners) |
|---|---|---|
| Borussia Dortmund | 1994–95 Bundesliga champions | 1 (**1989**) |
| Borussia Mönchengladbach | 1994–95 DFB-Pokal winners | None |

== Match ==
=== Details ===
5 August 1995

| Borussia Dortmund | 1–0 | Borussia Mönchengladbach |
|---|---|---|
| Júlio César 71' | Report |

Rheinstadion, Düsseldorf
Attendance: 40,000
Referee: Markus Merk (Kaiserslautern)

| **Borussia Dortmund** | **Borussia Mönchengladbach** |

| GK | **1** | (Germany) Stefan Klos |
| RB | | (Germany) Stefan Reuter |
| CB | | (Germany) Jürgen Kohler | (substituted off) 72' |
| CB | | (Brazil) Júlio César |
| LB | | (Germany) Martin Kree |
| RM | | (Germany) Steffen Freund |
| CM | | (Germany) Matthias Sammer (c) |
| CM | | (Czech Republic) Patrik Berger |
| LM | | (Germany) Knut Reinhardt | (substituted off) 89' |
| CF | | (Germany) Lars Ricken | (substituted off) 87' |
| CF | | (Germany) Andreas Möller |
Substitutes:
| DF | | (Germany) Bodo Schmidt | (substituted on) 72' |
| DF | | (Germany) Marco Kurz | (substituted on) 89' |
| MF | | (Germany) René Tretschok | (substituted on) 87' |
Manager:
(Germany) Ottmar Hitzfeld

| GK | **1** | (Germany) Uwe Kamps |
| RB | | (Germany) Thomas Kastenmaier | (substituted off) 75' |
| CB | | (Germany) Michael Klinkert |
| CB | | (Sweden) Patrik Andersson |
| LB | | (Germany) Jörg Neun |
| CM | | (Germany) Christian Hochstätter |
| CM | | (Germany) Stefan Effenberg (c) |
| CM | | (Germany) Peter Wynhoff |
| RW | | (Germany) Michael Sternkopf |
| CF | | (Sweden) Martin Dahlin |
| LW | | (Netherlands) Max Huiberts | (substituted off) 75' |
Substitutes:
| MF | | (Denmark) Peter Nielsen | (substituted on) 75' |
| MF | | (Germany) Karlheinz Pflipsen | (substituted on) 75' |
Manager:
(Austria) Bernd Krauss

== See also ==
- 1995–96 Bundesliga
- 1995–96 DFB-Pokal
