= Stéphane Chapuisat =

Swiss footballer (born 1969)

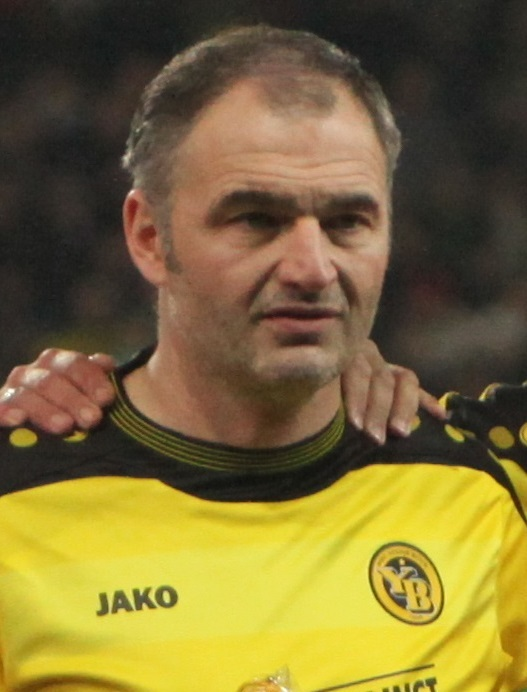
- Chapuisat in 2014

Personal information
- Date of birth: 28 June 1969 (age 57)
- Place of birth: Lausanne, Switzerland
- Height: 1.80 m (5 ft 11 in)
- Position: Striker

Youth career
- 1978–1980: Red Star Zürich
- 1980–1985: Lausanne
- 1985–1986: Malley

Senior career*
Years	Team	Apps	(Gls)
1986–1987	Malley	32	(16)
1987–1990	Lausanne	104	(36)
1991	Bayer Uerdingen	10	(4)
1991–1999	Borussia Dortmund	218	(102)
1999–2002	Grasshoppers	61	(39)
2002–2005	Young Boys	100	(53)
2005–2006	Lausanne	32	(16)
Total		547	(262)

International career
1989–2004	Switzerland	103	(21)
- * Club domestic league appearances and goals

Stéphane Chapuisat (French: [stefan ʃapɥiza]; born 28 June 1969) is a Swiss former professional footballer who played as a striker. He is currently the sporting director of BSC Young Boys.

A prolific goalscorer for both club and country (for which he appeared more than 100 times), he spent most of his career with Bundesliga club Borussia Dortmund, and is regarded as one of the best strikers the club ever had. He represented Switzerland at the 1994 World Cup and two European Championships.

== Club career ==
Born in Lausanne, Chapuisat started his professional career with hometown club FC Lausanne-Sport, moving in January 1991 to Bundesliga's Bayer Uerdingen and switching to powerhouse Borussia Dortmund in that summer.

Chapuisat scored 20 league goals in his first season, two short of Fritz Walter of the eventual champions VfB Stuttgart. He stayed with Borussia until 1999, conquering back-to-back titles – although he played sparingly in 1995–96 due to injuries – and adding the following campaign's UEFA Champions League, where he netted three in ten games during the victorious run.

Chapuisat then transferred to Grasshopper Club Zürich, playing there for three years and helped them winning the league title in 2001. In 2002, he moved to fellow Swiss Super League side BSC Young Boys, before rejoining Lausanne now in the second division, retiring at 37 with 106 goals in 228 Bundesliga matches to his credit; he was also voted Swiss Footballer of the Year four times (1992, 1993, 1994 and 2001).

In November 2003, to celebrate UEFA's Jubilee, Chapuisat was selected as the Golden Player of Switzerland by the Swiss Football Association as their most outstanding player of the past 50 years.

== International career ==
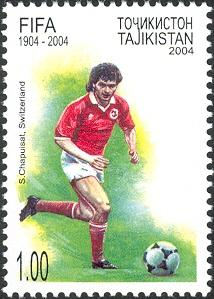
Chapuisat on a stamp as a player of Switzerland

Chapuisat scored 21 goals in 103 caps for Switzerland, and played in the 1994 FIFA World Cup, UEFA Euro 1996 and Euro 2004.

In the 1994 World Cup, appearing in four complete contests as the nation reached the round-of-16, he scored in a 4–1 win over Romania on 22 June.

== Personal life ==
Chapuisat's father, Pierre-Albert, was also a professional footballer. A defender, he too represented Lausanne and the national team, going on to have a lengthy career as a manager.

== Career statistics ==
Scores and results list Switzerland's goal tally first, score column indicates score after each Chapuisat goal.

List of international goals scored by Stéphane Chapuisat
No.	Date	Venue	Opponent	Score	Result	Competition
1	14 November 1990	Stadio Olimpico, Serravalle, San Marino	San Marino	2–0	4–0	UEFA Euro 1992 qualifying
2	11 September 1991	Wankdorf, Bern, Switzerland	Scotland	1–0	2–2	UEFA Euro 1992 qualifying
3	9 December 1991	Allmend, Lucerne, Switzerland	Sweden	1–0	3–1	Friendly
4	16 August 1992	Kadrioru, Tallinn, Estonia	Estonia	1–0	6–0	1994 FIFA World Cup qualification
5	16 August 1992	Kadrioru, Tallinn, Estonia	Estonia	5–0	6–0	1994 FIFA World Cup qualification
6	14 October 1992	Sant'Elia, Cagliari, Italy	Italy	2–0	2–2	1994 FIFA World Cup qualification
7	18 November 1992	Wankdorf, Bern, Switzerland	Malta	3–0	3–0	1994 FIFA World Cup qualification
8	31 March 1993	Wankdorf, Bern, Switzerland	Portugal	1–0	1–1	1994 FIFA World Cup qualification
9	17 November 1993	Hardturm, Zürich, Switzerland	Estonia	4–0	4–0	1994 FIFA World Cup qualification
10	20 April 1994	Hardturm, Zürich, Switzerland	Czech Republic	1–0	3–0	Friendly
11	20 April 1994	Hardturm, Zürich, Switzerland	Czech Republic	3–0	3–0	Friendly
12	22 June 1994	Pontiac Silverdome, Pontiac, United States	Romania	2–1	4–1	1994 FIFA World Cup
13	20 August 1997	Nepstadion, Budapest, Hungary	Hungary	1–1	1–1	1998 FIFA World Cup qualification
14	11 October 1997	Hardturm, Zürich, Switzerland	Azerbaijan	4–0	5–0	1998 FIFA World Cup qualification
15	14 October 1998	Hardturm, Zürich, Switzerland	Denmark	1–0	1–1	UEFA Euro 2000 qualifying
16	31 March 1999	Letzigrund, Zürich, Switzerland	Wales	1–0	2–0	UEFA Euro 2000 qualifying
17	31 March 1999	Letzigrund, Zürich, Switzerland	Wales	2–0	2–0	UEFA Euro 2000 qualifying
18	29 March 2000	Cornaredo, Lugano, Switzerland	Norway	1–1	2–2	Friendly
19	24 March 2001	Stadion FK Partizan, Belgrade, Yugoslavia	FR Yugoslavia	1–1	1–1	2002 FIFA World Cup qualification
20	28 March 2001	Hardturm, Zürich, Switzerland	Luxembourg	4–0	5–0	2002 FIFA World Cup qualification
21	8 September 2002	St. Jakob, Basel, Switzerland	Georgia	4–1	4–1	UEFA Euro 2004 qualifying

== Honours ==
Borussia Dortmund

- Bundesliga: 1994–95, 1995–96
- DFB-Supercup: 1995, 1996
- UEFA Champions League: 1996–97
- Intercontinental Cup: 1997

Grasshoppers

- Swiss Super League: 2000–01

Individual

- Ballon d'Or: 1991 (13th), 1992 (9th), 1993 (9th)
- kicker Bundesliga Team of the Season: 1991–92
- Swiss Super League top scorer: 2000–01, 2003–04
- UEFA Jubilee Awards – Greatest Swiss Footballer of the last 50 Years: 2003

== See also ==
- List of men's footballers with 100 or more international caps
