= Michael Zorc =

German football player and executive

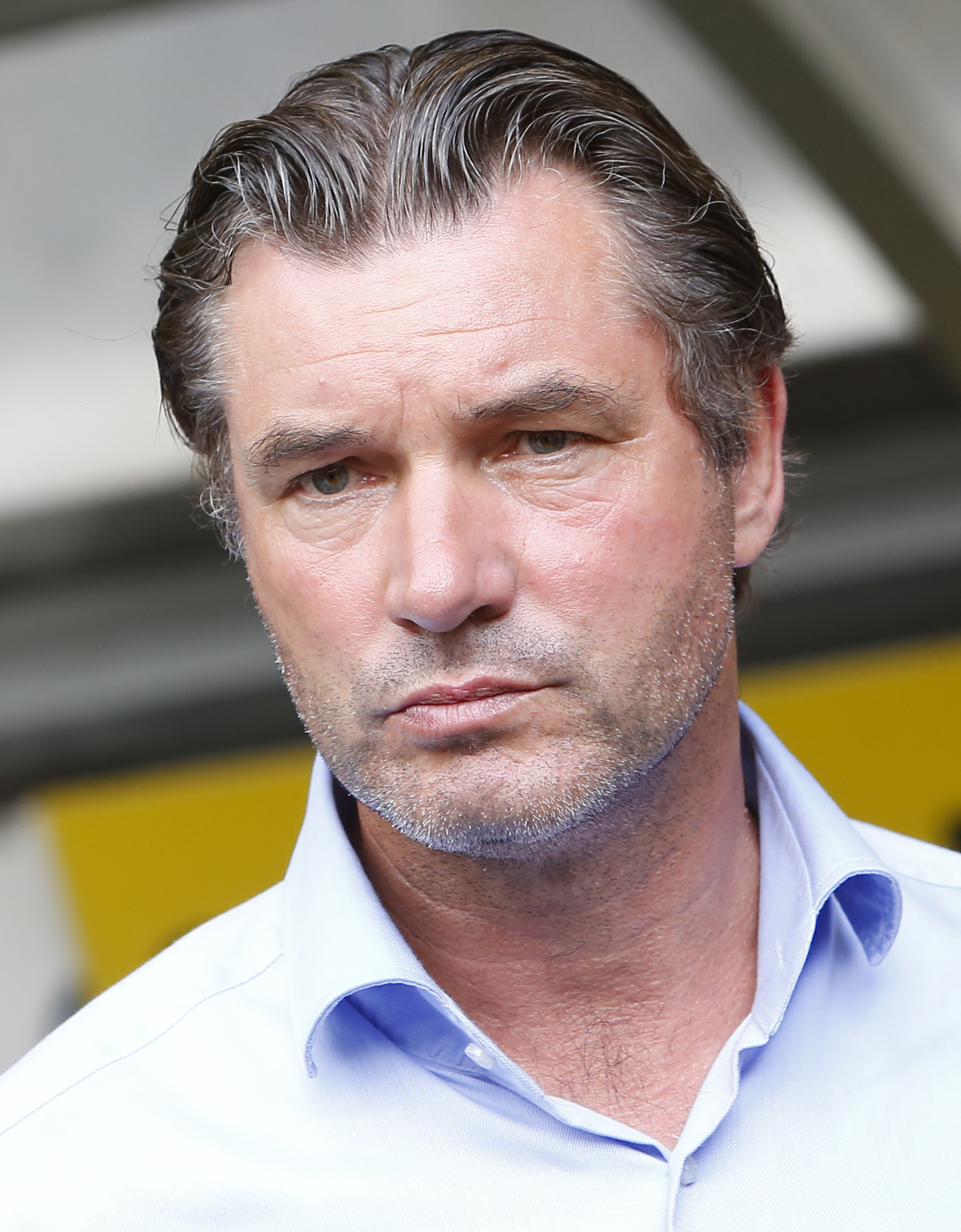
- Zorc in 2014

Personal information
- Full name: Michael Zorc
- Date of birth: 25 August 1962 (age 64)
- Place of birth: Dortmund, West Germany
- Height: 1.83 m (6 ft 0 in)
- Position: Midfielder

Youth career
- 1969–1978: TuS Eving-Lindenhorst
- 1978–1981: Borussia Dortmund

Senior career*
Years	Team	Apps	(Gls)
1981–1998	Borussia Dortmund	463	(131)

International career
1982–1983	West Germany U21	2	(0)
1986	West Germany B	1	(0)
1987–1988	West Germany Olympic	5	(0)
1992–1993	Germany	7	(0)
Medal record
Representing West Germany
Men's football
FIFA World Youth Championship
Winner	1981 Australia
- * Club domestic league appearances and goals

Michael Zorc (born 25 August 1962) is a German former professional footballer who played as a midfielder. He spent his entire career with Borussia Dortmund, appearing in 572 competitive matches in 17 seasons and scoring 159 goals. After retiring, he was the club's sporting director from 2005 to 2022.

== Club career ==
Born in Dortmund and nicknamed "Susi" because of his long hair, Zorc played 463 Bundesliga games for Borussia Dortmund (a club record) between 1981 and 1998, also serving as the team's captain for many years. He also ranked, at one time, their second all-time top goalscorer, thanks in part to his penalty-taking ability. He made his professional debut on 24 October 1981 in a 2–0 away loss against SV Werder Bremen, becoming first choice from his second season onwards.

The tail-end of Zorc's career saw also his greatest successes, as Dortmund were twice crowned national champions as well as winning the 1996–97 UEFA Champions League and the Intercontinental Cup. He scored in double digits in seven seasons, including 15 apiece from 1994 to 1996.

== International career ==
Zorc earned seven caps for Germany. His debut came on 16 December 1992 aged already 30, during a 3–1 friendly defeat to Brazil.

== Executive career ==
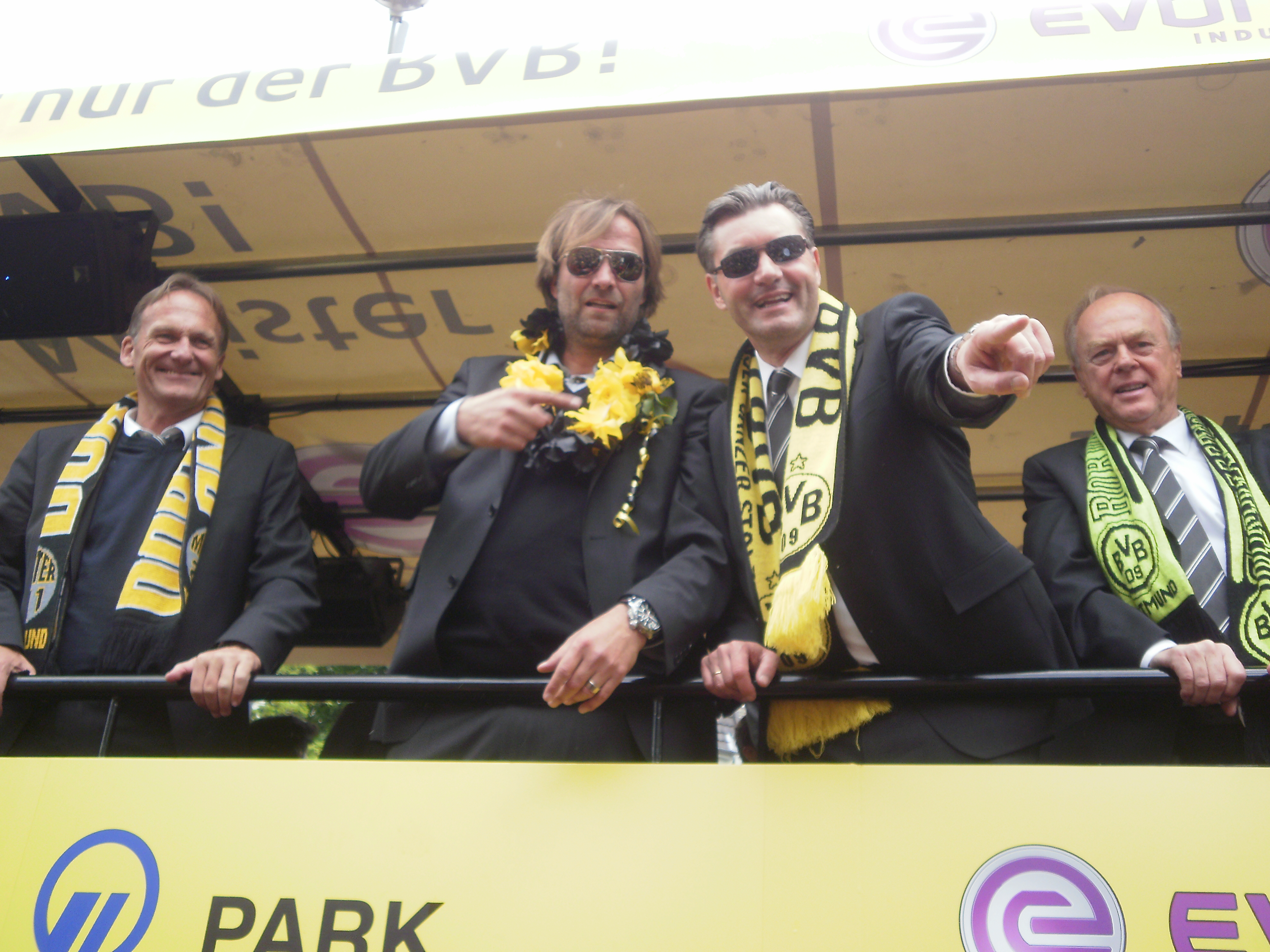
Zorc (third from left) celebrating Dortmund's win of the 2010–11 Bundesliga alongside Hans-Joachim Watzke (first from left) and Jürgen Klopp (second from left)

Zorc retired from football at age 36, and was given a farewell with fireworks in his home stadium, after which he became Borussia Dortmund's sporting director. He was in charge when the team won the national championship in 2002, 2011 and 2012, playing a key part in pulling the club out of financial ruin alongside Hans-Joachim Watzke.

In June 2022, Zorc stepped down. He was replaced in the role by Sebastian Kehl.

== Personal life ==
Zorc's father Dieter played in the top division for VfL Bochum and was an amateur international for Germany.

== Honours ==
Borussia Dortmund

- Bundesliga: 1994–95, 1995–96
- DFL-Supercup: 1989, 1996
- DFB-Pokal: 1988–89
- UEFA Champions League: 1996–97
- Intercontinental Cup: 1997
- UEFA Cup runner-up: 1992–93
- UEFA Super Cup runner-up: 1997

West Germany Youth

- FIFA U-20 World Cup: 1981
- UEFA European Under-18 Championship: 1981

== See also ==
- List of one-club men
