= 1994–95 Bundesliga =

32nd season of the Bundesliga

Bundesliga
- Season: 1994–95
- Dates: 19 August 1994 – 17 June 1995
- Champions: Borussia Dortmund; 1st Bundesliga title 4th German title
- Relegated: Bochum; Duisburg; Dynamo Dresden
- Champions League: Borussia Dortmund
- Cup Winners' Cup: Borussia Mönchengladbach
- UEFA Cup: Werder Bremen; Freiburg; Kaiserslautern; Bayern Munich
- Intertoto Cup: Bayer Leverkusen; Karlsruhe; Frankfurt; Köln
- Goals: 902
- Average goals/game: 2.95
- Top goalscorer: Mario Basler, Heiko Herrlich (20)
- Biggest home win: M'gladbach 7–1 Bochum (24 September 1994)
- Biggest away win: Köln 1–6 Dortmund (23 August 1994); Duisburg 0–5 Hamburg (30 October 1994)
- Highest scoring: M'gladbach 7–1 Bochum (8 goals) (24 September 1994); Schalke 6–2 1860 (8 goals) (20 May 1995); Karlsruhe 5–3 Dresden (8 goals) (27 May 1995)

The 1994–95 Bundesliga was the 32nd season of the Bundesliga, Germany's premier football league. It began on 19 August 1994 and ended on 17 June 1995. FC Bayern Munich were the defending champions.

This was the final season in which two points were awarded for a win; going forward this changed to three points.

== Competition format ==
Every team played two games against each other team, one at home and one away. Teams received two points for a win and one point for a draw. If two or more teams were tied on points, places were determined by goal difference and, if still tied, by goals scored. The team with the most points were crowned champions while the three teams with the fewest points were relegated to 2. Bundesliga.

== Team changes to 1993–94 ==
1. FC Nürnberg, SG Wattenscheid 09 and VfB Leipzig were relegated to the 2. Bundesliga after finishing in the last three places. They were replaced by VfL Bochum, Bayer 05 Uerdingen and TSV 1860 Munich.

== Team overview ==
Location of teams in Bundesliga 1994–95

| Club | Location | Ground | Capacity |
|---|---|---|---|
| VfL Bochum | Bochum | Ruhrstadion | 38,000 |
| SV Werder Bremen | Bremen | Weserstadion | 32,000 |
| Borussia Dortmund | Dortmund | Westfalenstadion | 42,800 |
| Dynamo Dresden | Dresden | Rudolf-Harbig-Stadion | 30,000 |
| MSV Duisburg | Duisburg | Wedaustadion | 31,500 |
| Eintracht Frankfurt | Frankfurt | Waldstadion | 62,000 |
| SC Freiburg | Freiburg im Breisgau | Dreisamstadion | 18,000 |
| Hamburger SV | Hamburg | Volksparkstadion | 62,000 |
| 1. FC Kaiserslautern | Kaiserslautern | Fritz-Walter-Stadion | 38,500 |
| Karlsruher SC | Karlsruhe | Wildparkstadion | 40,000 |
| 1. FC Köln | Cologne | Müngersdorfer Stadion | 55,000 |
| Bayer 04 Leverkusen | Leverkusen | Ulrich-Haberland-Stadion | 27,800 |
| Borussia Mönchengladbach | Mönchengladbach | Bökelbergstadion | 34,500 |
| TSV 1860 Munich | Munich | Stadion an der Grünwalder Straße | 28,500 |
| FC Bayern Munich | Munich | Olympiastadion | 63,000 |
| FC Schalke 04 | Gelsenkirchen | Parkstadion | 70,000 |
| VfB Stuttgart | Stuttgart | Neckarstadion | 53,700 |
| Bayer 05 Uerdingen | Krefeld | Grotenburg-Stadion | 34,500 |

- ^1 1860 Munich played four high risk home matches at Olympiastadion.

== League table ==
| Pos | Team | Pld | W | D | L | GF | GA | GD | Pts | Qualification or relegation |
|---|---|---|---|---|---|---|---|---|---|---|
| 1 | Borussia Dortmund (C) | 34 | 20 | 9 | 5 | 67 | 33 | +34 | 49 | Qualification to Champions League group stage |
| 2 | Werder Bremen | 34 | 20 | 8 | 6 | 70 | 39 | +31 | 48 | Qualification to UEFA Cup first round |
| 3 | SC Freiburg | 34 | 20 | 6 | 8 | 66 | 44 | +22 | 46 | Qualification to UEFA Cup first round |
| 4 | 1. FC Kaiserslautern | 34 | 17 | 12 | 5 | 58 | 41 | +17 | 46 | Qualification to UEFA Cup first round |
| 5 | Borussia Mönchengladbach | 34 | 17 | 9 | 8 | 66 | 41 | +25 | 43 | Qualification to Cup Winners' Cup first round |
| 6 | Bayern Munich | 34 | 15 | 13 | 6 | 55 | 41 | +14 | 43 | Qualification to UEFA Cup first round (Note: As Mönchengladbach qualified for the Cup Winners' Cup, their UEFA Cup place was transferred to Bayern Munich.) |
| 7 | Bayer Leverkusen | 34 | 13 | 10 | 11 | 62 | 51 | +11 | 36 | Qualification to Intertoto Cup group stage |
| 8 | Karlsruher SC | 34 | 11 | 14 | 9 | 51 | 47 | +4 | 36 | Qualification to Intertoto Cup group stage |
| 9 | Eintracht Frankfurt | 34 | 12 | 9 | 13 | 41 | 49 | −8 | 33 | Qualification to Intertoto Cup group stage |
| 10 | 1. FC Köln | 34 | 11 | 10 | 13 | 54 | 54 | 0 | 32 | Qualification to Intertoto Cup group stage |
| 11 | Schalke 04 | 34 | 10 | 11 | 13 | 48 | 54 | −6 | 31 | |
| 12 | VfB Stuttgart | 34 | 10 | 10 | 14 | 52 | 66 | −14 | 30 | |
| 13 | Hamburger SV | 34 | 10 | 9 | 15 | 43 | 50 | −7 | 29 | |
| 14 | 1860 Munich | 34 | 8 | 11 | 15 | 41 | 57 | −16 | 27 | |
| 15 | Bayer 05 Uerdingen | 34 | 7 | 11 | 16 | 37 | 52 | −15 | 25 | |
| 16 | VfL Bochum (R) | 34 | 9 | 4 | 21 | 43 | 67 | −24 | 22 | Relegation to 2. Bundesliga |
| 17 | MSV Duisburg (R) | 34 | 6 | 8 | 20 | 31 | 64 | −33 | 20 | Relegation to 2. Bundesliga |
| 18 | Dynamo Dresden (R) | 34 | 4 | 8 | 22 | 33 | 68 | −35 | 16 | Relegation to Regionalliga (Note: Dynamo Dresden were denied a professional license by the DFB and thus relegated to the Regionalliga.) |

Source: www.dfb.de
Rules for classification: 1) points; 2) goal difference; 3) number of goals scored.
(C) Champions; (R) Relegated

== Results ==
| Home \ Away | BOC | SVW | BVB | SGD | DUI | SGE | SCF | HSV | FCK | KSC | KOE | B04 | BMG | M60 | FCB | S04 | VFB | B05 |
|---|---|---|---|---|---|---|---|---|---|---|---|---|---|---|---|---|---|---|
| VfL Bochum | — | 1–3 | 0–2 | 2–0 | 1–0 | 0–1 | 1–3 | 0–0 | 0–2 | 0–1 | 1–0 | 1–3 | 0–2 | 2–2 | 1–2 | 5–1 | 4–0 | 2–1 |
| Werder Bremen | 3–0 | — | 3–1 | 1–0 | 5–1 | 2–0 | 5–1 | 1–4 | 2–2 | 2–1 | 2–2 | 3–2 | 1–0 | 2–0 | 0–0 | 2–1 | 4–0 | 6–1 |
| Borussia Dortmund | 3–1 | 2–0 | — | 2–0 | 1–0 | 1–1 | 1–1 | 2–0 | 2–1 | 2–1 | 2–1 | 0–3 | 1–1 | 4–0 | 1–0 | 3–2 | 5–0 | 3–1 |
| Dynamo Dresden | 0–2 | 1–1 | 0–1 | — | 4–2 | 1–2 | 1–3 | 1–1 | 1–0 | 1–1 | 1–3 | 1–1 | 0–3 | 1–1 | 0–1 | 2–1 | 1–1 | 1–2 |
| MSV Duisburg | 3–1 | 0–2 | 2–3 | 1–1 | — | 1–0 | 1–2 | 0–5 | 3–2 | 0–0 | 1–3 | 0–2 | 0–2 | 1–1 | 0–3 | 2–2 | 2–0 | 2–0 |
| Eintracht Frankfurt | 2–1 | 0–0 | 4–1 | 2–0 | 4–1 | — | 1–2 | 2–0 | 1–3 | 1–0 | 0–0 | 2–0 | 2–1 | 3–1 | 2–0 (Note: The Eintracht Frankfurt v Bayern Munich match from 15 April 1995, which finished with a score of 2–5, was later awarded on 2 May 1995 to Eintracht Frankfurt with a score of 2–0 due to Bayern Munich having more than the three allowed amateur players on the pitch.) | 0–3 | 2–2 | 0–3 |
| SC Freiburg | 1–2 | 1–3 | 1–1 | 3–1 | 3–0 | 2–0 | — | 3–0 | 4–1 | 2–1 | 4–2 | 1–1 | 1–1 | 1–1 | 5–1 | 3–0 | 2–0 | 1–0 |
| Hamburger SV | 3–1 | 0–0 | 0–4 | 2–1 | 3–0 | 3–1 | 1–2 | — | 0–0 | 3–1 | 0–4 | 1–2 | 1–2 | 3–0 | 1–1 | 3–0 | 0–2 | 0–0 |
| 1. FC Kaiserslautern | 3–1 | 1–1 | 1–0 | 3–1 | 1–0 | 1–1 | 3–2 | 4–1 | — | 0–0 | 3–1 | 1–0 | 2–2 | 1–1 | 1–1 | 3–1 | 3–2 | 1–1 |
| Karlsruher SC | 2–2 | 3–1 | 0–0 | 5–3 | 4–1 | 1–1 | 2–0 | 2–0 | 3–3 | — | 0–0 | 2–4 | 2–4 | 3–1 | 2–2 | 2–2 | 3–1 | 2–1 |
| 1. FC Köln | 2–1 | 1–1 | 1–6 | 1–2 | 0–3 | 3–0 | 2–0 | 1–1 | 0–1 | 3–4 | — | 3–3 | 1–3 | 2–1 | 3–1 | 5–1 | 1–0 | 2–0 |
| Bayer Leverkusen | 1–3 | 1–2 | 2–2 | 2–2 | 2–0 | 4–0 | 2–4 | 3–1 | 0–1 | 0–0 | 3–1 | — | 3–1 | 0–2 | 2–0 | 2–2 | 3–1 | 1–1 |
| Borussia Mönchengladbach | 7–1 | 2–0 | 3–3 | 2–0 | 1–0 | 2–0 | 1–2 | 2–1 | 4–0 | 2–2 | 0–0 | 3–3 | — | 2–0 | 2–2 | 0–1 | 3–1 | 1–0 |
| 1860 Munich | 4–0 | 1–2 | 1–5 | 3–1 | 1–1 | 2–1 | 4–0 | 1–1 | 1–3 | 1–0 | 2–1 | 1–1 | 2–0 | — | 1–3 | 0–1 | 0–2 | 1–1 |
| Bayern Munich | 3–1 | 3–1 | 2–1 | 2–1 | 1–1 | 3–3 | 2–2 | 1–1 | 1–1 | 0–1 | 2–2 | 2–1 | 3–0 | 1–0 | — | 2–0 | 2–2 | 2–1 |
| Schalke 04 | 3–2 | 4–2 | 0–0 | 4–0 | 0–0 | 0–0 | 1–2 | 0–1 | 0–1 | 0–0 | 3–1 | 3–2 | 1–1 | 6–2 | 0–3 | — | 1–1 | 2–0 |
| VfB Stuttgart | 2–2 | 1–4 | 0–0 | 4–2 | 3–1 | 4–1 | 1–0 | 2–1 | 2–2 | 4–0 | 2–2 | 4–2 | 2–4 | 1–1 | 0–2 | 1–1 | — | 3–1 |
| Bayer Uerdingen | 2–1 | 1–3 | 0–2 | 3–1 | 1–1 | 1–1 | 0–2 | 4–1 | 1–3 | 0–0 | 0–0 | 0–1 | 3–2 | 1–1 | 1–1 | 1–1 | 4–1 | — |

Source: DFB
Legend: Blue = home team win; Yellow = draw; Red = away team win.

== Top goalscorers ==
20 goals

- (Germany) Mario Basler (Werder Bremen)
- (Germany) Heiko Herrlich (Borussia Mönchengladbach)

17 goals

- (Austria) Toni Polster (1. FC Köln)

16 goals

- (Argentina) Rodolfo Esteban Cardoso (SC Freiburg)
- (Czech Republic) Pavel Kuka (1. FC Kaiserslautern)
- (Germany) Rudi Völler (Bayer Leverkusen)

15 goals

- (Germany) Ulf Kirsten (Bayer Leverkusen)
- (Germany) Michael Zorc (Borussia Dortmund)

14 goals

- (Germany) Marco Bode (Werder Bremen)
- (Germany) Stefan Kuntz (1. FC Kaiserslautern)
- (Germany) Bruno Labbadia (1. FC Köln)
- (Germany) Andreas Möller (Borussia Dortmund)

== Attendances ==
| No. | Team | Attendance | Change | Highest |
|---|---|---|---|---|
| 1 | Bayern München | 54,176 | 12.2% | 63,000 |
| 2 | Borussia Dortmund | 42,784 | 1.7% | 42,800 |
| 3 | Schalke 04 | 39,883 | 12.3% | 70,925 |
| 4 | 1. FC Kaiserslautern | 37,180 | 8.2% | 38,500 |
| 5 | Werder Bremen | 32,209 | 32.0% | 40,633 |
| 6 | 1. FC Köln | 31,765 | 2.3% | 55,000 |
| 7 | VfB Stuttgart | 31,692 | 11.7% | 53,700 |
| 8 | Borussia Mönchengladbach | 31,404 | 16.5% | 34,500 |
| 9 | TSV 1860 | 30,591 | 56.5% | 64,000 |
| 10 | Hamburger SV | 30,445 | -2.9% | 60,200 |
| 11 | Eintracht Frankfurt | 29,912 | -5.3% | 58,000 |
| 12 | Karlsruher SC | 28,862 | 31.1% | 33,758 |
| 13 | VfL Bochum | 24,585 | 42.7% | 38,000 |
| 14 | Bayer Leverkusen | 21,934 | 14.8% | 27,800 |
| 15 | MSV Duisburg | 21,103 | -9.4% | 30,128 |
| 16 | SC Freiburg | 17,500 | 16.7% | 18,000 |
| 17 | Bayer 05 Uerdingen | 17,351 | 247.6% | 34,500 |
| 18 | Dynamo Dresden | 16,688 | 4.4% | 29,253 |

== See also ==
- 1994–95 2. Bundesliga
- 1994–95 DFB-Pokal
