= 1997–98 Borussia Dortmund season =

1997–98 season of Borussia Dortmund

Borussia Dortmund
1997–98 season
- Manager: Nevio Scala
- Bundesliga: 10th
- DFB-Pokal: Round of 16
- DFB-Ligapokal: Semi-finals
- UEFA Super Cup: Runners-up
- UEFA Champions League: Semi-finals
- Intercontinental Cup: Winners
- Top goalscorer: Stéphane Chapuisat (14)
Home colours	Away colours

During the 1997–98 German football season, Borussia Dortmund competed in the German Bundesliga, finishing 10th.

== Season summary ==
Manager Ottmar Hitzfeld was promoted to sporting director, and Nevio Scala was appointed as his replacement. Under Scala, Dortmund made a strong showing in the Champions League: although they failed to defend the title, there was no shame in their semi-final defeat to eventual winners Real Madrid. Of more concern was their league form, coming 10th (their lowest finish since 1991). This prompted his departure; replacing him was his assistant Michael Skibbe, making him (until 2016) the youngest Bundesliga head coach of all time.

== First-team squad ==
Squad at end of season

Note: Flags indicate national team as defined under FIFA eligibility rules; some limited exceptions apply. Players may hold more than one non-FIFA nationality.

No.	Pos.	Nation	Player
1	GK	GER	Stefan Klos
2	MF	GER	Knut Reinhardt
3	DF	GER	René Schneider
4	MF	GER	Steffen Freund
5	DF	BRA	Júlio César
6	MF	GER	Matthias Sammer
7	DF	GER	Stefan Reuter
8	MF	GER	Michael Zorc
9	FW	SUI	Stéphane Chapuisat
10	MF	GER	Andreas Möller
11	FW	GER	Heiko Herrlich
12	GK	GER	Wolfgang de Beer
13	FW	GHA	Bashiru Gambo
15	DF	GER	Jürgen Kohler
16	DF	GER	Martin Kree

No.	Pos.	Nation	Player
17	MF	GER	Jörg Heinrich
18	MF	GER	Lars Ricken
21	FW	GER	Christian Timm
22	FW	GHA	Ibrahim Tanko
23	DF	GER	Jörg Sauerland
24	FW	NED	Harry Decheiver
26	MF	GER	Frank Riethmann
27	DF	AUT	Wolfgang Feiersinger
28	DF	GER	Benjamin Knoche
29	MF	RUS	Vladimir But
30	FW	USA	Jovan Kirovski
31	DF	NOR	Steinar Pedersen
32	DF	GER	Manfred Binz
33	DF	GER	Deniz Sahin
34	DF	GER	Björn Mehnert

=== Left club during season ===
Note: Flags indicate national team as defined under FIFA eligibility rules; some limited exceptions apply. Players may hold more than one non-FIFA nationality.

No.	Pos.	Nation	Player
14	MF	SCO	Paul Lambert (to Celtic)
19	MF	POR	Paulo Sousa (to Internazionale)

No.	Pos.	Nation	Player
20	FW	SCO	Scott Booth (to Utrecht)

== Competitions ==
=== DFB-Ligapokal ===
==== Preliminary round ====
20 July 1997	Borussia Dortmund	1–0	VfL Bochum	Stadion Oberwerth, Koblenz
20:30	Chapuisat 62' (pen.)	Report		Attendance: 13,000; Referee: Hans-Peter Best

==== Semi-finals ====
23 July 1997	Bayern Munich	2–0	Borussia Dortmund	Rosenaustadion, Augsburg
19:00	Giovane Élber 29'; Babbel 75'	Report		Attendance: 25,000; Referee: Lutz Wagner

=== Bundesliga ===
==== League table ====
Pos	Team	Pld	W	D	L	GF	GA	GD	Pts	Qualification or relegation
8	MSV Duisburg	34	11	11	12	43	44	−1	44	Qualification to Cup Winners' Cup first round (Note: As domestic cup winners Bayern Munich had qualified for UEFA Champions League, their place in the Cup Winners' Cup was transferred to finalists Duisburg.)
9	Hamburger SV	34	11	11	12	38	46	−8	44	
10	Borussia Dortmund	34	11	10	13	57	55	+2	43	
11	Hertha BSC	34	12	7	15	41	53	−12	43	
12	VfL Bochum	34	11	8	15	41	49	−8	41	

Source: www.dfb.de
Rules for classification: 1) points; 2) goal difference; 3) number of goals scored.

=== UEFA Super Cup ===
8 January 1998	Barcelona (Spain)	2–0	(Germany) Borussia Dortmund	Camp Nou, Barcelona
21:00 CET	Luis Enrique 8'; Rivaldo 61' (pen.)	Report		Attendance: 50,000; Referee: David Elleray (England)

11 March 1998	Borussia Dortmund (Germany)	1–1 (1–3 agg.)	(Spain) Barcelona	Westfalenstadion, Dortmund
20:00 CET	Heinrich 64'	Report	Giovanni 8'	Attendance: 32,500; Referee: Piero Ceccarini (Italy)

=== Intercontinental Cup ===
==== Final ====
2 December 1997	Borussia Dortmund (Germany)	2–0	(Brazil) Cruzeiro	National Stadium, Tokyo
19:10 JST	Zorc 34'; Herrlich 85'	Report		Attendance: 46,953; Referee: José García-Aranda (Spain)

=== Champions League ===
==== Group stage ====
Pos	Team	Pld	W	D	L	GF	GA	GD	Pts	Qualification
1	(Germany) Borussia Dortmund	6	5	0	1	14	3	+11	15	Advance to knockout stage
2	(Italy) Parma	6	2	3	1	6	5	+1	9	
3	(Czech Republic) Sparta Prague	6	1	2	3	6	11	−5	5	
4	(Turkey) Galatasaray	6	1	1	4	4	11	−7	4	

Source: UEFA

17 September 1997	Galatasaray (Turkey)	0–1	(Germany) Borussia Dortmund	Ali Sami Yen Stadium, Istanbul
20:45		Report	Chapuisat 74'	Attendance: 23,000; Referee: José García-Aranda (Spain)

1 October 1997	Borussia Dortmund (Germany)	4–1	(Czech Republic) Sparta Prague	Westfalenstadion, Dortmund
20:45	Herrlich 20'; Chapuisat 59', 75'; Heinrich 69'	Report	Siegl 76'	Attendance: 42,000; Referee: Vítor Melo Pereira (Portugal)

22 October 1997	Parma (Italy)	1–0	(Germany) Borussia Dortmund	Stadio Ennio Tardini, Parma
20:45	Crespo 62'	Report		Attendance: 13,449; Referee: Gilles Veissière (France)

5 November 1997	Borussia Dortmund (Germany)	2–0	(Italy) Parma	Westfalenstadion, Dortmund
20:45	Möller 50', 75'	Report		Attendance: 40,000; Referee: Kim Milton Nielsen (Denmark)

27 November 1997	Borussia Dortmund (Germany)	4–1	(Turkey) Galatasaray	Westfalenstadion, Dortmund
20:45	But 22'; Herrlich 34'; Zorc 48', 86'	Report	Penbe 87'	Attendance: 45,000; Referee: Rune Pedersen (Norway)

10 December 1997	Sparta Prague (Czech Republic)	0–3	(Germany) Borussia Dortmund	Letná Stadium, Prague
20:45		Report	Möller 29'; Kirovski 47'; Booth 71'	Attendance: 10,925; Referee: Hugh Dallas (Scotland)

==== Quarter-finals ====
4 March 1998	Bayern Munich (Germany)	0–0	(Germany) Borussia Dortmund	Olympiastadion, Munich
20:45		Report		Attendance: 60,000; Referee: Pierluigi Collina (Italy)

18 March 1998	Borussia Dortmund (Germany)	1–0 (a.e.t.) (1–0 agg.)	(Germany) Bayern Munich	Westfalenstadion, Dortmund
20:45	Chapuisat 109'	Report		Attendance: 48,500; Referee: László Vagner (Hungary)

==== Semi-finals ====
1 April 1998	Real Madrid (Spain)	2–0	(Germany) Borussia Dortmund	Santiago Bernabéu Stadium, Madrid
22:00	Morientes 24'; Karembeu 67'	Report		Attendance: 85,000; Referee: Mario van der Ende (Netherlands)

15 April 1998	Borussia Dortmund (Germany)	0–0 (0–2 agg.)	(Spain) Real Madrid	Westfalenstadion, Dortmund
20:45		Report		Attendance: 48,500; Referee: Paul Durkin (England)
