= 1998–99 Borussia Dortmund season =

1998–99 season of Borussia Dortmund

Borussia Dortmund
1998–99 season
- Manager: Michael Skibbe
- Bundesliga: 4th
- DFB-Pokal: Round of 16
- Top goalscorer: League: Stéphane Chapuisat (8 goals); All: Stéphane Chapuisat (8 goals)
Home colours	Away colours

Dortmund's form improved during the 1998–99 season and they climbed to 4th, qualifying again for the Champions League.

== Players ==
=== First-team squad ===
Squad at end of season

Note: Flags indicate national team as defined under FIFA eligibility rules; some limited exceptions apply. Players may hold more than one non-FIFA nationality.

No.	Pos.	Nation	Player
1	GK	GER	Jens Lehmann
3	DF	GER	René Schneider
4	MF	FR Yugoslavia	Miroslav Stević
5	DF	GER	Jürgen Kohler
7	DF	GER	Stefan Reuter
8	MF	GER	Christian Nerlinger
9	FW	SUI	Stéphane Chapuisat
10	MF	GER	Andreas Möller
11	FW	GER	Heiko Herrlich
12	GK	GER	Wolfgang de Beer
13	FW	GHA	Bashiru Gambo
14	FW	BIH	Sergej Barbarez
15	DF	NED	Alfred Nijhuis
16	DF	GER	Martin Kree

No.	Pos.	Nation	Player
17	DF	BRA	Dedé
18	MF	GER	Lars Ricken
19	DF	GER	Thomas Hengen
20	MF	GER	Thomas Häßler
21	FW	GER	Christian Timm
22	FW	GHA	Ibrahim Tanko
24	FW	NED	Harry Decheiver
26	MF	GER	Frank Riethmann
27	DF	AUT	Wolfgang Feiersinger
29	MF	RUS	Vladimir But
30	FW	TOG	Bachirou Salou
32	DF	GER	Manfred Binz
33	DF	GER	Karsten Baumann

=== Left club during season ===
Note: Flags indicate national team as defined under FIFA eligibility rules; some limited exceptions apply. Players may hold more than one non-FIFA nationality.

No.	Pos.	Nation	Player
1	GK	GER	Stefan Klos (to Rangers)
2	MF	GER	Knut Reinhardt (to 1. FC Nürnberg)
4	MF	GER	Steffen Freund (to Tottenham Hotspur)

No.	Pos.	Nation	Player
6	MF	GER	Matthias Sammer (retired)
31	DF	NOR	Steinar Pedersen (to Lillestrøm)

== Competitions ==
=== Bundesliga ===
==== League table ====
Pos	Team	Pld	W	D	L	GF	GA	GD	Pts	Qualification or relegation
2	Bayer Leverkusen	34	17	12	5	61	30	+31	63	Qualification to Champions League group stage
3	Hertha BSC	34	18	8	8	59	32	+27	62	Qualification to Champions League third qualifying round
4	Borussia Dortmund	34	16	9	9	48	34	+14	57	Qualification to Champions League third qualifying round
5	1. FC Kaiserslautern	34	17	6	11	51	47	+4	57	Qualification to UEFA Cup first round
6	VfL Wolfsburg	34	15	10	9	54	49	+5	55	Qualification to UEFA Cup first round

Source: www.dfb.de
Rules for classification: 1) points; 2) goal difference; 3) number of goals scored.
