= 1997 UEFA Super Cup =

Barcelona	Borussia Dortmund
(Spain)	(Germany)
3	1
- on aggregate

First leg
Barcelona	Borussia Dortmund
2	0
- Date: 8 January 1998
- Venue: Camp Nou, Barcelona
- Referee: David Elleray (England)
- Attendance: 50,000

Second leg
Borussia Dortmund	Barcelona
1	1
- Date: 11 March 1998
- Venue: Westfalenstadion, Dortmund
- Referee: Piero Ceccarini (Italy)
- Attendance: 32,500

The 1997 UEFA Super Cup was a two-legged football match played on 8 January 1998 and 11 March 1998 between Borussia Dortmund of Germany, winner of the 1996–97 UEFA Champions League, and Barcelona of Spain, winner of the 1996–97 UEFA Cup Winners' Cup. Barcelona won the match 3–1 on aggregate, beating Borussia Dortmund 2–0 at Camp Nou in the first leg and drawing the second leg 1–1 in Westfalenstadion, Dortmund.

This was the last Super Cup played over two legs. Since 1998, it has been played as a single match at a neutral venue.

== Match details ==
=== First leg ===
8 January 1998
21:00 CET

Barcelona (Spain)	2–0	(Germany) Borussia Dortmund
Luis Enrique 8'; Rivaldo 61' (pen.)	Report

Camp Nou, Barcelona
Attendance: 50,000
Referee: David Elleray (England)

Barcelona	Borussia Dortmund

GK	13	(Netherlands) Ruud Hesp
RB	2	(Spain) Albert Ferrer
CB	26	(Netherlands) Winston Bogarde
CB	22	(Netherlands) Michael Reiziger	(substituted off) 70'
LB	12	(Spain) Sergi
DM	17	(Spain) Albert Celades
CM	23	(Spain) Iván de la Peña
AM	11	(Brazil) Rivaldo	(substituted off) 86'
RW	7	(Portugal) Luís Figo (c)	(substituted off) 86'
LW	21	(Spain) Luis Enrique
CF	9	(Brazil) Sonny Anderson
Substitutes:
GK	25	(Spain) Carles Busquets
DF	3	(Spain) Abelardo	(substituted on) 70'
DF	5	(Portugal) Fernando Couto
MF	10	(Brazil) Giovanni	(substituted on) 86'
MF	16	(Federal Republic of Yugoslavia) Dragan Ćirić
FW	8	(Bulgaria) Hristo Stoichkov	(substituted on) 86'
FW	19	(Spain) Juan Antonio Pizzi
Manager:
(Netherlands) Louis van Gaal

GK	1	(Germany) Stefan Klos
SW	26	(Germany) Manfred Binz
CB	16	(Germany) Martin Kree
CB	3	(Germany) René Schneider	(substituted off) 46'
RWB	18	(Germany) Lars Ricken (c)
LWB	17	(Germany) Jörg Heinrich
CM	4	(Germany) Steffen Freund
CM	24	(Russia) Vladimir But	(substituted off) 77'
AM	22	(United States) Jovan Kirovski
CF	27	(Netherlands) Harry Decheiver
CF	13	(Ghana) Ibrahim Tanko	(substituted off) 58'
Substitutes:
GK	12	(Germany) Wolfgang de Beer
DF	2	(Germany) Knut Reinhardt	(substituted on) 46'
DF	20	(Austria) Wolfgang Feiersinger
MF	8	(Germany) Michael Zorc	(substituted on) 77'
MF	21	(Germany) Frank Riethmann
FW	9	(Switzerland) Stéphane Chapuisat	(substituted on) 58'
FW	23	(Scotland) Scott Booth
Manager:
(Italy) Nevio Scala

Assistant referees:
Philip Sharp (England)
Mark Warren (England)
Fourth official:
Peter Jones (England)

Match rules

- 90 minutes.
- Seven named substitutes.
- Maximum of three substitutions.

=== Second leg ===
11 March 1998
20:00 CET

Borussia Dortmund (Germany)	1–1	(Spain) Barcelona
Heinrich 64'	Report	Giovanni 8'

Westfalenstadion, Dortmund
Attendance: 32,500
Referee: Piero Ceccarini (Italy)

Borussia Dortmund	Barcelona

GK	1	(Germany) Stefan Klos
SW	26	(Germany) Manfred Binz
CB	3	(Germany) René Schneider
CB	15	(Germany) Jürgen Kohler (c)	(substituted off) 73'
RWB	17	(Germany) Jörg Heinrich
LWB	16	(Germany) Martin Kree
CM	18	(Germany) Lars Ricken
CM	4	(Germany) Steffen Freund	(substituted off) 20'
CM	8	(Germany) Michael Zorc
CF	27	(Netherlands) Harry Decheiver
CF	9	(Switzerland) Stéphane Chapuisat	(substituted off) 46'
Substitutes:
GK	12	(Germany) Wolfgang de Beer
DF	2	(Germany) Knut Reinhardt
MF	10	(Germany) Andreas Möller
MF	25	(Germany) Björn Mehnert	(substituted on) 20'
FW	22	(United States) Jovan Kirovski	(substituted on) 73'
FW	28	(Germany) Christian Timm
FW	36	(Ghana) Bashiru Gambo	(substituted on) 46'
Manager:
(Italy) Nevio Scala

GK	13	(Netherlands) Ruud Hesp
RB	2	(Spain) Albert Ferrer
CB	26	(Netherlands) Winston Bogarde
CB	20	(Spain) Miguel Ángel Nadal
LB	12	(Spain) Sergi
CM	17	(Spain) Albert Celades	(substituted off) 79'
CM	21	(Spain) Luis Enrique	(substituted off) 89'
AM	10	(Brazil) Giovanni
RW	7	(Portugal) Luís Figo (c)
LW	11	(Brazil) Rivaldo
CF	9	(Brazil) Sonny Anderson	(substituted off) 71'
Substitutes:
GK	25	(Spain) Carles Busquets
DF	5	(Portugal) Fernando Couto
DF	22	(Netherlands) Michael Reiziger
MF	6	(Spain) Óscar	(substituted on) 71'
MF	16	(Federal Republic of Yugoslavia) Dragan Ćirić	(substituted on) 89'
MF	18	(Spain) Guillermo Amor	(substituted on) 79'
MF	24	(Spain) Roger
Manager:
(Netherlands) Louis van Gaal

Assistant referees:
Sergio Zuccolini (Italy)
Luigi Medeot (Italy)
Fourth official:
Alfredo Trentalange (Italy)

Match rules

- 90 minutes.
- 30 minutes of golden goal extra time if necessary.
- Penalty shoot-out if scores still level.
- Seven named substitutes.
- Maximum of three substitutions.

== See also ==
- 1997–98 UEFA Champions League
- 1997–98 UEFA Cup Winners' Cup
- 1997–98 Borussia Dortmund season
- 1997–98 FC Barcelona season
- Borussia Dortmund in international football
- FC Barcelona in international football
