= Sauerland (surname) =

Sauerland is a German surname. Notable people with the surname include:

- David Sauerland (born 1997), German footballer
- Jörg Sauerland (born 1976), German footballer
- Wilfried Sauerland (born 1940), German boxing promoter and manager
