= Borussia Dortmund in international football =

German club in international football

Borussia Dortmund in European football
- Club: Borussia Dortmund
- Seasons played: 39
- First entry: 1956–57 European Cup
- Latest entry: 2026–27 UEFA Champions League

Titles
- Champions League: 1: 1997
- Cup Winners' Cup: 1: 1966
- Intercontinental Cup: 1: 1997

Ballspielverein Borussia 09 e.V. Dortmund, commonly known as Borussia Dortmund, BVB, or simply Dortmund, is a German sports club based in Dortmund, North Rhine-Westphalia (Borussia is the Latin equivalent of Prussia).

Borussia Dortmund was founded in 1909 by eighteen football players from Dortmund. Borussia Dortmund have won eight German championships, five DFB-Pokals, six DFL-Supercups, one UEFA Champions League, one UEFA Cup Winners' Cup, and one Intercontinental Cup. Their Cup Winners' Cup win in 1966 made them the first German club to win a European title.

This is the list of all Borussia Dortmund's European and international matches.

== Overall record ==
As of 20 October 2026

=== By competition ===
Competition	Pld	W	D	L	GF	GA	GD	Win %
European Cup / Champions League	210	102	40	68	362	269	+93	48.57
UEFA Cup / UEFA Europa League	92	48	17	27	148	97	+51	52.17
UEFA Super Cup	2	0	1	1	1	3	−2	0.00
UEFA Cup Winners' Cup	15	9	3	3	32	15	+17	60.00
UEFA Intertoto Cup	4	1	2	1	3	3	+0	25.00
Intercontinental Cup	1	1	0	0	2	0	+2	100.00
FIFA Club World Cup	5	3	1	1	9	7	+2	60.00
Total	329	164	64	101	557	394	+163	49.85

=== By country ===
Country	Pld	W	D	L	GF	GA	GD	Win %
Austria	7	5	1	1	11	3	+8	71.43
Azerbaijan	5	5	0	0	14	2	+12	100.00
Belgium	15	9	2	4	24	13	+11	60.00
Bosnia and Herzegovina	2	1	0	1	3	2	+1	50.00
Brazil	2	1	1	0	2	0	+2	50.00
Bulgaria	2	1	0	1	5	4	+1	50.00
Croatia	1	1	0	0	3	0	+3	100.00
Cyprus	2	0	2	0	2	2	+0	0.00
Czech Republic	12	8	3	1	23	6	+17	66.67
Denmark	7	5	2	0	12	4	+8	71.43
England	37	14	6	17	40	48	−8	37.84
France	28	12	7	9	35	34	+1	42.86
Germany	5	3	1	1	6	2	+4	60.00
Greece	4	1	1	2	3	5	−2	25.00
Italy	44	14	8	22	57	72	−15	31.82
Luxembourg	3	2	0	1	12	5	+7	66.67
Malta	4	4	0	0	21	3	+18	100.00
Mexico	1	1	0	0	2	1	+1	100.00
Netherlands	13	4	4	5	17	20	−3	30.77
Norway	8	4	2	2	22	16	+6	50.00
Poland	4	3	1	0	18	7	+11	75.00
Portugal	16	10	1	5	27	12	+15	62.50
Romania	9	7	1	1	19	9	+10	77.78
Russia	10	7	1	2	17	8	+9	70.00
Scotland	17	7	5	5	27	20	+7	41.18
Slovakia	2	1	0	1	4	2	+2	50.00
Slovenia	2	1	1	0	2	1	+1	50.00
South Africa	1	1	0	0	4	3	+1	100.00
South Korea	1	1	0	0	1	0	+1	100.00
Spain	47	16	12	19	79	79	+0	34.04
Turkey	10	8	1	1	23	6	+17	80.00
Ukraine	9	7	2	0	23	9	+14	77.78

== Results ==
Season	Competition	Round	Opponent	Home	Away	Aggregate	Reference
1956–57	European Cup	Preliminary round	Spora Luxembourg	4–3	1–2	12–5 (7–0 p/o)	
1956–57	European Cup	First round	(England) Manchester United	0–0	2–3	2–3	
1957–58	European Cup	First round	(Romania) Steaua București	4–2	1–3	8–6 (3–1 p/o)	
1957–58	European Cup	Quarter-finals	(Italy) Milan	1–1	1–4	2–5	
1963–64	European Cup	Preliminary round	(Norway) Lyn	3–1	4–2	7–3	
1963–64	European Cup	First round	(Portugal) Benfica	5–0	1–2	6–2	
1963–64	European Cup	Quarter-finals	(Czechoslovakia) Dukla Prague	1–3	4–0	5–3	
1963–64	European Cup	Semi-finals	(Italy) Internazionale	2–2	0–2	2–4	
1965–66	Cup Winners' Cup	First round	(Malta) Floriana	8–0	5–1	13–1	
1965–66	Cup Winners' Cup	Second round	(Bulgaria) CSKA Sofia	3–0	2–4	5–4	
1965–66	Cup Winners' Cup	Quarter-finals	(Spain) Atlético Madrid	1–0	1–1	2–1	
1965–66	Cup Winners' Cup	Semi-finals	(England) West Ham United	3–1	2–1	5–2	
1965–66	Cup Winners' Cup	Final	(England) Liverpool	2–1 (a.e.t.)			
1966–67	Cup Winners' Cup	Second round	(Scotland) Rangers	0–0	1–2	1–2	
1982–83	UEFA Cup	First round	(Scotland) Rangers	0–0	0–2	0–2	
1987–88	UEFA Cup	First round	(Scotland) Celtic	2–0	1–2	3–2	
1987–88	UEFA Cup	Second round	(Socialist Federal Republic of Yugoslavia) Velež Mostar	2–0	1–2	3–2	
1987–88	UEFA Cup	Third round	(Belgium) Club Brugge	3–0	0–5	3–5	
1989–90	Cup Winners' Cup	First round	(Turkey) Beşiktaş	2–1	1–0	3–1	
1989–90	Cup Winners' Cup	Second round	(Italy) Sampdoria	1–1	0–2	1–3	
1990–91	UEFA Cup	First round	(East Germany) Chemnitzer FC	2–0	2–0	4–0	
1990–91	UEFA Cup	Second round	(Romania) Universitatea Craiova	1–0	3–0	4–0	
1990–91	UEFA Cup	Third round	(Belgium) Anderlecht	2–1	0–1	2–2 (a)	
1992–93	UEFA Cup	First round	(Malta) Floriana	7–2	1–0	8–2	
1992–93	UEFA Cup	Second round	(Scotland) Celtic	1–0	2–1	3–1	
1992–93	UEFA Cup	Third round	(Spain) Zaragoza	3–1	1–2	4–3	
1992–93	UEFA Cup	Quarter-finals	(Italy) Roma	2–0	0–1	2–1	
1992–93	UEFA Cup	Semi-finals	(France) Auxerre	2–0	0–2 (a.e.t.)	2–2 (6–5 p)	
1992–93	UEFA Cup	Final	(Italy) Juventus	1–3	0–3	1–6	
1993–94	UEFA Cup	First round	(Russia) Spartak Vladikavkaz	0–0	1–0	1–0	
1993–94	UEFA Cup	Second round	(Slovenia) Maribor	2–1	0–0	2–1	
1993–94	UEFA Cup	Third round	(Denmark) Brøndby	1–0	1–1	2–1	
1993–94	UEFA Cup	Quarter-finals	(Italy) Internazionale	1–3	2–1	3–4	
1994–95	UEFA Cup	First round	(Scotland) Motherwell	1–0	2–0	3–0	
1994–95	UEFA Cup	Second round	(Slovakia) Slovan Bratislava	3–0	1–2	4–2	
1994–95	UEFA Cup	Third round	(Spain) Deportivo La Coruña	3–1 (a.e.t.)	1–0	3–2	
1994–95	UEFA Cup	Quarter-finals	(Italy) Lazio	2–0	0–1	2–1	
1994–95	UEFA Cup	Semi-finals	(Italy) Juventus	1–2	2–2	3–4	
1995–96	UEFA Champions League	Group C	(Italy) Juventus	1–3	2–1	2nd	
1995–96	UEFA Champions League	Group C	(Romania) Steaua București	1–0	0–0	2nd	
1995–96	UEFA Champions League	Group C	(Scotland) Rangers	2–2	2–2	2nd	
1995–96	UEFA Champions League	Quarter-finals	(Netherlands) Ajax	0–2	0–1	0–3	
1996–97	UEFA Champions League	Group B	(Poland) Widzew Łódź	2–1	2–2	2nd	
1996–97	UEFA Champions League	Group B	(Spain) Atlético Madrid	1–2	1–0	2nd	
1996–97	UEFA Champions League	Group B	(Romania) Steaua București	5–3	3–0	2nd	
1996–97	UEFA Champions League	Quarter-finals	(France) Auxerre	3–1	1–0	4–1	
1996–97	UEFA Champions League	Semi-finals	(England) Manchester United	1–0	1–0	2–0	
1996–97	UEFA Champions League	Final	(Italy) Juventus	3–1			
1997–98	Intercontinental Cup	Final	(Brazil) Cruzeiro	2–0			
1997–98	UEFA Super Cup	Final	(Spain) Barcelona	1–1	0–2	1–3	
1997–98	UEFA Champions League	Group A	(Turkey) Galatasaray	4–1	1–0	1st	
1997–98	UEFA Champions League	Group A	(Czech Republic) Sparta Prague	4–1	3–0	1st	
1997–98	UEFA Champions League	Group A	(Italy) Parma	2–0	0–1	1st	
1997–98	UEFA Champions League	Quarter-finals	(Germany) Bayern Munich	1–0 (a.e.t.)	0–0	1–0	
1997–98	UEFA Champions League	Semi-finals	(Spain) Real Madrid	0–0	0–2	0–2	
1999–2000	UEFA Champions League	Third qualifying round	(Czech Republic) Teplice	1–0	1–0	2–0	
1999–2000	UEFA Champions League	Group C	(Netherlands) Feyenoord	1–1	1–1	3rd	
1999–2000	UEFA Champions League	Group C	(Portugal) Boavista	3–1	0–1	3rd	
1999–2000	UEFA Champions League	Group C	(Norway) Rosenborg	0–3	2–2	3rd	
1999–2000	UEFA Cup	Third round	(Scotland) Rangers	2–0 (a.e.t.)	0–2	2–2 (3–1 p)	
1999–2000	UEFA Cup	Fourth round	(Turkey) Galatasaray	0–2	0–0	0–2	
2001–02	UEFA Champions League	Third qualifying round	(Ukraine) Shakhtar Donetsk	3–1	2–0	5–1	
2001–02	UEFA Champions League	Group B	(Ukraine) Dynamo Kyiv	1–0	2–2	3rd	
2001–02	UEFA Champions League	Group B	(Portugal) Boavista	2–1	1–2	3rd	
2001–02	UEFA Champions League	Group B	(England) Liverpool	0–0	0–2	3rd	
2001–02	UEFA Cup	Third round	(Denmark) Copenhagen	1–0	1–0	2–0	
2001–02	UEFA Cup	Fourth round	(France) Lille	0–0	1–1	1–1 (a)	
2001–02	UEFA Cup	Quarter-finals	(Czech Republic) Slovan Liberec	4–0	0–0	4–0	
2001–02	UEFA Cup	Semi-finals	(Italy) Milan	4–0	1–3	5–3	
2001–02	UEFA Cup	Final	(Netherlands) Feyenoord	2–3			
2002–03	UEFA Champions League	Group A	(England) Arsenal	2–1	0–2	2nd	
2002–03	UEFA Champions League	Group A	(France) Auxerre	2–1	0–1	2nd	
2002–03	UEFA Champions League	Group A	(Netherlands) PSV Eindhoven	1–1	3–1	2nd	
2002–03	UEFA Champions League	Group C	(Russia) Lokomotiv Moscow	3–0	2–1	3rd	
2002–03	UEFA Champions League	Group C	(Italy) Milan	0–1	1–0	3rd	
2002–03	UEFA Champions League	Group C	(Spain) Real Madrid	1–1	1–2	3rd	
2003–04	UEFA Champions League	Third qualifying round	(Belgium) Club Brugge	2–1 (a.e.t.)	1–2	3–3 (2–4 p)	
2003–04	UEFA Cup	First round	Austria Wien	1–0	2–1	3–1	
2003–04	UEFA Cup	Second round	(France) Sochaux	2–2	0–4	2–6	
2004–05	UEFA Intertoto Cup	Third round	(Belgium) Genk	1–2	1–0	2–2 (a)	
2005–06	UEFA Intertoto Cup	Third round	(Czech Republic) Sigma Olomouc	1–1	0–0	1–1 (a)	
2008–09	UEFA Cup	First round	(Italy) Udinese	0–2	2–0 (a.e.t.)	2–2 (3–4 p)	
2010–11	UEFA Europa League	Play-off round	(Azerbaijan) Qarabağ	4–0	1–0	5–0	
2010–11	UEFA Europa League	Group J	(Ukraine) Karpaty Lviv	3–0	4–3	3rd	
2010–11	UEFA Europa League	Group J	(Spain) Sevilla	0–1	2–2	3rd	
2010–11	UEFA Europa League	Group J	(France) Paris Saint-Germain	1–1	0–0	3rd	
2011–12	UEFA Champions League	Group F	(England) Arsenal	1–1	1–2	4th	
2011–12	UEFA Champions League	Group F	(France) Marseille	2–3	0–3	4th	
2011–12	UEFA Champions League	Group F	(Greece) Olympiacos	1–0	1–3	4th	
2012–13	UEFA Champions League	Group D	(Netherlands) Ajax	1–0	4–1	1st	
2012–13	UEFA Champions League	Group D	(England) Manchester City	1–0	1–1	1st	
2012–13	UEFA Champions League	Group D	(Spain) Real Madrid	2–1	2–2	1st	
2012–13	UEFA Champions League	Round of 16	(Ukraine) Shakhtar Donetsk	3–0	2–2	5–2	
2012–13	UEFA Champions League	Quarter-finals	(Spain) Málaga	3–2	0–0	3–2	
2012–13	UEFA Champions League	Semi-finals	(Spain) Real Madrid	4–1	0–2	4–3	
2012–13	UEFA Champions League	Final	(Germany) Bayern Munich	1–2			
2013–14	UEFA Champions League	Group F	(Italy) Napoli	3–1	1–2	1st	
2013–14	UEFA Champions League	Group F	(France) Marseille	3–0	2–1	1st	
2013–14	UEFA Champions League	Group F	(England) Arsenal	0–1	2–1	1st	
2013–14	UEFA Champions League	Round of 16	(Russia) Zenit Saint Petersburg	1–2	4–2	5–4	
2013–14	UEFA Champions League	Quarter-finals	(Spain) Real Madrid	2–0	0–3	2–3	
2014–15	UEFA Champions League	Group D	(England) Arsenal	2–0	0–2	1st	
2014–15	UEFA Champions League	Group D	(Belgium) Anderlecht	1–1	3–0	1st	
2014–15	UEFA Champions League	Group D	(Turkey) Galatasaray	4–1	4–0	1st	
2014–15	UEFA Champions League	Round of 16	(Italy) Juventus	0–3	1–2	1–5	
2015–16	UEFA Europa League	Third qualifying round	(Austria) Wolfsberger AC	5–0	1–0	6–0	
2015–16	UEFA Europa League	Play-off round	(Norway) Odds	7–2	4–3	11–5	
2015–16	UEFA Europa League	Group C	(Russia) Krasnodar	2–1	0–1	2nd	
2015–16	UEFA Europa League	Group C	(Greece) PAOK	0–1	1–1	2nd	
2015–16	UEFA Europa League	Group C	(Azerbaijan) Gabala	4–0	3–1	2nd	
2015–16	UEFA Europa League	Round of 32	(Portugal) Porto	2–0	1–0	3–0	
2015–16	UEFA Europa League	Round of 16	(England) Tottenham Hotspur	3–0	2–1	5–1	
2015–16	UEFA Europa League	Quarter-finals	(England) Liverpool	1–1	3–4	4–5	
2016–17	UEFA Champions League	Group F	(Poland) Legia Warsaw	8–4	6–0	1st	
2016–17	UEFA Champions League	Group F	(Spain) Real Madrid	2–2	2–2	1st	
2016–17	UEFA Champions League	Group F	(Portugal) Sporting CP	1–0	2–1	1st	
2016–17	UEFA Champions League	Round of 16	(Portugal) Benfica	4–0	0–1	4–1	
2016–17	UEFA Champions League	Quarter-finals	(France) Monaco	2–3	1–3	3–6	
2017–18	UEFA Champions League	Group H	(England) Tottenham Hotspur	1–2	1–3	3rd	
2017–18	UEFA Champions League	Group H	(Spain) Real Madrid	1–3	2–3	3rd	
2017–18	UEFA Champions League	Group H	(Cyprus) APOEL	1–1	1–1	3rd	
2017–18	UEFA Europa League	Round of 32	(Italy) Atalanta	3–2	1–1	4–3	
2017–18	UEFA Europa League	Round of 16	(Austria) Red Bull Salzburg	1–2	0–0	1–2	
2018–19	UEFA Champions League	Group A	(Belgium) Club Brugge	0–0	1–0	1st	
2018–19	UEFA Champions League	Group A	(France) Monaco	3–0	2–0	1st	
2018–19	UEFA Champions League	Group A	(Spain) Atlético Madrid	4–0	0–2	1st	
2018–19	UEFA Champions League	Round of 16	(England) Tottenham Hotspur	0–1	0–3	0–4	
2019–20	UEFA Champions League	Group F	(Spain) Barcelona	0–0	1–3	2nd	
2019–20	UEFA Champions League	Group F	(Czech Republic) Slavia Prague	2–1	2–0	2nd	
2019–20	UEFA Champions League	Group F	(Italy) Internazionale	3–2	0–2	2nd	
2019–20	UEFA Champions League	Round of 16	(France) Paris Saint-Germain	2–1	0–2	2–3	
2020–21	UEFA Champions League	Group F	(Italy) Lazio	1–1	1–3	1st	
2020–21	UEFA Champions League	Group F	(Belgium) Club Brugge	3–0	3–0	1st	
2020–21	UEFA Champions League	Group F	(Russia) Zenit Saint Petersburg	2–0	2–1	1st	
2020–21	UEFA Champions League	Round of 16	(Spain) Sevilla	2–2	3–2	5–4	
2020–21	UEFA Champions League	Quarter-finals	(England) Manchester City	1–2	1–2	2–4	
2021–22	UEFA Champions League	Group C	(Turkey) Beşiktaş	5–0	2–1	3rd	
2021–22	UEFA Champions League	Group C	(Portugal) Sporting CP	1–0	1–3	3rd	
2021–22	UEFA Champions League	Group C	(Netherlands) Ajax	1–3	0–4	3rd	
2021–22	UEFA Europa League	Knockout round play-offs	(Scotland) Rangers	2–4	2–2	4–6	
2022–23	UEFA Champions League	Group G	(Denmark) Copenhagen	3–0	1–1	2nd	
2022–23	UEFA Champions League	Group G	(England) Manchester City	0–0	1–2	2nd	
2022–23	UEFA Champions League	Group G	(Spain) Sevilla	1–1	4–1	2nd	
2022–23	UEFA Champions League	Round of 16	(England) Chelsea	1–0	0–2	1–2	
2023–24	UEFA Champions League	Group F	(France) Paris Saint-Germain	1–1	0–2	1st	
2023–24	UEFA Champions League	Group F	(Italy) Milan	0–0	3–1	1st	
2023–24	UEFA Champions League	Group F	(England) Newcastle United	2–0	1–0	1st	
2023–24	UEFA Champions League	Round of 16	(Netherlands) PSV Eindhoven	2–0	1–1	3–1	
2023–24	UEFA Champions League	Quarter-finals	(Spain) Atlético Madrid	4–2	1–2	5–4	
2023–24	UEFA Champions League	Semi-finals	(France) Paris Saint-Germain	1–0	1–0	2–0	
2023–24	UEFA Champions League	Final	(Spain) Real Madrid	0–2			
2024–25	UEFA Champions League	League phase	(Belgium) Club Brugge	—N/a	3–0	10th	
2024–25	UEFA Champions League	League phase	(Scotland) Celtic	7–1	—N/a	10th	
2024–25	UEFA Champions League	League phase	(Spain) Real Madrid	—N/a	2–5	10th	
2024–25	UEFA Champions League	League phase	(Austria) Sturm Graz	1–0	—N/a	10th	
2024–25	UEFA Champions League	League phase	(Croatia) Dinamo Zagreb	—N/a	3–0	10th	
2024–25	UEFA Champions League	League phase	(Spain) Barcelona	2–3	—N/a	10th	
2024–25	UEFA Champions League	League phase	(Italy) Bologna	—N/a	1–2	10th	
2024–25	UEFA Champions League	League phase	(Ukraine) Shakhtar Donetsk	3–1	—N/a	10th	
2024–25	UEFA Champions League	Knockout phase play-offs	(Portugal) Sporting CP	0–0	3–0	3–0	
2024–25	UEFA Champions League	Round of 16	(France) Lille	1–1	2–1	3–2	
2024–25	UEFA Champions League	Quarter-finals	(Spain) Barcelona	3–1	0–4	3–5	
2024–25	FIFA Club World Cup	Group F	(Brazil) Fluminense	0–0		1st	
2024–25	FIFA Club World Cup	Group F	(South Africa) Mamelodi Sundowns	4–3		1st	
2024–25	FIFA Club World Cup	Group F	(South Korea) Ulsan HD	1–0		1st	
2024–25	FIFA Club World Cup	Round of 16	(Mexico) Monterrey	2–1			
2024–25	FIFA Club World Cup	Quarter-finals	(Spain) Real Madrid	2–3			
2025–26	UEFA Champions League	League phase	(Italy) Juventus	—N/a	4–4	17th	
2025–26	UEFA Champions League	League phase	(Spain) Athletic Bilbao	4–1	—N/a	17th	
2025–26	UEFA Champions League	League phase	(Denmark) Copenhagen	—N/a	4–2	17th	
2025–26	UEFA Champions League	League phase	(England) Manchester City	—N/a	1–4	17th	
2025–26	UEFA Champions League	League phase	(Spain) Villarreal	4–0	—N/a	17th	
2025–26	UEFA Champions League	League phase	(Norway) Bodø/Glimt	2–2	—N/a	17th	
2025–26	UEFA Champions League	League phase	(England) Tottenham Hotspur	—N/a	0–2	17th	
2025–26	UEFA Champions League	League phase	(Italy) Internazionale	0–2	—N/a	17th	
2025–26	UEFA Champions League	Knockout phase play-offs	(Italy) Atalanta	2–0	1–4	3–4	
2026–27	UEFA Champions League	League phase	(Spain) Villarreal	3–2	—N/a		
2026–27	UEFA Champions League	League phase	(Norway) Bodø/Glimt	—N/a	0–1		
2026–27	UEFA Champions League	League phase	(Azerbaijan) Sabah	—N/a	2–1		
2026–27	UEFA Champions League	League phase	(Spain) Real Betis		—N/a		
2026–27	UEFA Champions League	League phase	(England) Arsenal	—N/a			
2026–27	UEFA Champions League	League phase	(Italy) Internazionale		—N/a		
2026–27	UEFA Champions League	League phase	(England) Aston Villa	—N/a			
2026–27	UEFA Champions League	League phase	(Greece) AEK Athens		—N/a		

Source: UEFA.com, Last updated on 20 October 2026.
Pld = Matches played; W = Matches won; D = Matches drawn; L = Matches lost; GF = Goals for; GA = Goals against; GD = Goal difference.
