= Björn Mehnert =

German footballer and manager

Personal information
- Date of birth: 24 August 1976 (age 50)
- Place of birth: Dortmund, West Germany
- Height: 1.84 m (6 ft 0 in)
- Positions: Defender; midfielder

Team information
- Current team: Bonner SC (Head coach)

Senior career*
Years	Team	Apps	(Gls)
1995–1998	Borussia Dortmund II		
1997–1998	Borussia Dortmund	3	(0)
1998–1999	LR Ahlen	11	(0)
1999–2002	Borussia Dortmund II	119	(9)
2002–2007	Wuppertaler SV	124	(8)
2007	Preußen Münster	16	(0)
2007–2009	Wuppertaler SV II		
2009–2010	Westfalia Rhynern		
2010–2011	SV Hohenlimburg		

Managerial career
- 2008–2009: Wuppertaler SV II (player-assistant)
- 2009–2010: Westfalia Rhynern (player-assistant)
- 2010–2011: SV Hohenlimburg (player-coach)
- 2012–2017: Westfalia Rhynern
- 2017–2020: SC Wiedenbrück
- 2020: Rot Weiss Ahlen
- 2020–2022: Wuppertaler SV
- 2024: 1. FC Bocholt
- 2025–: Bonner SC
- * Club domestic league appearances and goals

Björn Mehnert (born 24 August 1976) is a German football manager and a former player who played as a defender or midfielder.

== Career ==
Mehnert began his career with his hometown club, Borussia Dortmund, and progressed through the reserve team, being promoted to the first-team squad of the then-European champions in 1997. He made his debut in the second leg of the UEFA Super Cup against Barcelona, replacing Steffen Freund as a 20th-minute substitute, and made three appearances in the Bundesliga, and one in the Champions League, against Sparta Prague.

Mehnert left Dortmund at the end of the 1997–98 season, joining ambitious Regionalliga side LR Ahlen, but returned six months later for another couple of seasons in Dortmund's reserve team. In 2002, he signed for Wuppertaler SV, where he spent four and a half seasons, leaving in January 2007 to join Preußen Münster. Six months later he returned to Wuppertal to play for the reserve team, before joining amateur side Westfalia Rhynern. In 2010, he was appointed as player-manager of SV Hohenlimburg, before returning to manage Rhynern a year later, having retired. He also works for VfL Osnabrück, in the capacity of sports marketing and video analysis.
