= Vitali But =

Russian footballer and official

Personal information
- Full name: Vitali Vladimirovich But
- Date of birth: 16 November 1972 (age 53)
- Place of birth: Novorossiysk, Soviet Union
- Height: 1.87 m (6 ft 2 in)
- Position: Midfielder

Youth career
- EShVSM Moscow

Senior career*
Years	Team	Apps	(Gls)
1989	Tsement Novorossiysk	3	(1)
1989–1992	Dynamo Moscow	12	(1)
1993	Lokomotiv Moscow	4	(0)
1993–1995	Chernomorets Novorossiysk	78	(18)
1996–1998	Arsenal Tula	62	(5)

International career
1991	USSR U-20	1	(0)
1992	USSR U-21	4	(0)
1992–1993	Russia U-21	2	(0)

Managerial career
- 2009–2010: Chernomorets Novorossiysk (general director)
- 2018–2022: Chernomorets Novorossiysk (general director)
- * Club domestic league appearances and goals

Vitali Vladimirovich But (Russian: Виталий Владимирович Бут; born 16 November 1972) is a Russian football official and a former player who played as a midfielder.

== Playing career ==
During his professional career, which ended at the age of just 27, But played for Tsement Novorossiysk, Dynamo Moscow, Lokomotiv Moscow, Chernomorets Novorossiysk and Arsenal Tula. He represented the Soviet Union at the 1991 FIFA World Youth Championship in Portugal.

In May 2009, But re-joined former team Chernomorets, as its general director. His younger brother, Vladimir, was also a footballer — and a midfielder. He too represented Chernomorets Novorossiysk, but spent the better part of his professional career in Germany, namely with Borussia Dortmund.

== Traffic incident ==
On 5 October 2019, it was reported that he was being investigated on two charges - leaving the place of an incident and driving under influence after running over a child with his Range Rover a day before and driving away.
