= Vladimir But =

Russian former footballer

Personal information
- Full name: Vladimir Vladimirovich But
- Date of birth: 7 September 1977 (age 49)
- Place of birth: Novorossiysk, Soviet Union
- Height: 1.84 m (6 ft 0 in)
- Position: Midfielder

Team information
- Current team: Chernomorets Novorossiysk (director of sports)

Senior career*
Years	Team	Apps	(Gls)
1992–1994	Chernomorets Novorossiysk	41	(5)
1994–2000	Borussia Dortmund	76	(8)
2000	Borussia Dortmund II	1	(0)
2000–2004	SC Freiburg	67	(7)
2004–2005	Hannover 96	4	(0)
2005	Shinnik	7	(0)
2008	Chernomorets Novorossiysk	37	(4)
2009–2010	OFI	3	(0)
Total		236	(24)

International career
1994	Russia U-17	5	(2)
1997–1999	Russia U-21	12	(2)
1999–2000	Russia	2	(0)

Managerial career
- 2017–: Chernomorets Novorossiysk (director of sports)
- * Club domestic league appearances and goals

Vladimir Vladimirovich But (Russian: Владимир Владимирович Бут; born 7 September 1977) is a Russian former professional footballer who played as a midfielder. He works as director of sports for Chernomorets Novorossiysk.

== Career ==
In 1994, But signed with Borussia Dortmund at 17 years old.

On 21 August 1996, he finally made his first team debut, appearing in ten minutes of a 4–0 home league win against Fortuna Düsseldorf. But finished his first season with eleven appearances and one goal, and added two games (three minutes total) in the club's victorious UEFA Champions League campaign, becoming the second Russian player to win the competition after Igor Dobrovolski.

In late October 2000, But left Borussia after falling out with coach Matthias Sammer and joined SC Freiburg, where he stayed for the next three seasons, appearing regularly (but also being relegated at the end of the 2001–02 campaign). In January 2004, he stayed in the country as he signed with Hannover 96, but only made four league appearances in one and a half years.

But returned to his country in July 2005, and signed for Shinnik. After two years out of the game due to recurrent injuries, the 30-year-old re-joined hometown side Chernomorets, in the second division.

In June 2009, But signed with Greece's OFI as a free agent, but retired from football after one unassuming season. He collected two caps for Russia whilst at Borussia.

== Personal life ==
But's older brother, Vitali, was also a footballer – and a midfielder. He too represented Chernomorets Novorossiysk, later acting as its general manager.

== Career statistics ==
Appearances and goals by club, season and competition
Club	Season	League			National cup		League cup		Continental		Other		Total	
Club	Season	Division	Apps	Goals	Apps	Goals	Apps	Goals	Apps	Goals	Apps	Goals	Apps	Goals
Chernomorets Novorossiysk	1992	Russian First Division	4	0										
Chernomorets Novorossiysk	1993	Russian First Division	15	3										
Chernomorets Novorossiysk	1994	Russian First Division	22	2										
Chernomorets Novorossiysk	Total		41	5										
Borussia Dortmund	1995–96	Bundesliga	0	0	0	0	–		0	0	–			
Borussia Dortmund	1996–97	Bundesliga	11	1	1	0	–		2	0	1 (Note: Appearance in DFL-Supercup)	0	15	1
Borussia Dortmund	1997–98	Bundesliga	23	3	2	1	0	0	9	1	1 (Note: Appearance in UEFA Super Cup)	0	35	5
Borussia Dortmund	1998–99	Bundesliga	23	3	3	0	–		–		–		26	3
Borussia Dortmund	1999–2000	Bundesliga	19	1	0	0	2	0	3	0	–		24	1
Borussia Dortmund	Total		76	8	6	1	2	0	14	1	2	0	100	10
Borussia Dortmund II	2000–01	Regionalliga Nord	1	0	–		–		–		–		1	0
SC Freiburg	2000–01	Bundesliga	24	4	3	0	–		–		–		27	4
SC Freiburg	2001–02	Bundesliga	28	3	2	0	1	0	6	1	–		37	4
SC Freiburg	2002–03	2. Bundesliga	15	0	1	0	–		–		–		16	0
SC Freiburg	Total		67	7	6	0	1	0	6	1	0	0	80	8
Hannover 96	2003–04	Bundesliga	3	0	0	0	–		–		–		3	0
Hannover 96	2004–05	Bundesliga	1	0	0	0	–		–		–		1	0
Hannover 96	Total		4	0	0	0	0	0	0	0	0	0	4	0
Shinnik	2005	Russian Premier League	7	0										
Chernomorets	2008	Russian First Division	37	4										
OFI	2009–10	Greek Football League	3	0										
Career total			236	24	12	1	3	0	20	2	2	0	273	27

== Honours ==
Chernomorets Novorossiysk

- Russian National Football League: 1994

Borussia Dortmund

- Bundesliga: 1995–96
- DFB-Supercup: 1996
- UEFA Champions League: 1996–97
- Intercontinental Cup: 1997

SC Freiburg

- 2. Bundesliga: 2002–03
