= Knut Reinhardt =

German former professional footballer (born 1968)

Personal information
- Date of birth: 27 April 1968 (age 58)
- Place of birth: Hilden, West Germany
- Height: 1.81 m (5 ft 11 in)
- Position: Midfielder

Youth career
- SSV Lützenkirchen-Quettingen
- 1975–1977: Tus Quettingen
- 1977–1986: Bayer Leverkusen

Senior career*
| Years | Team | Apps | (Gls) |
| 1986–1991 | Bayer Leverkusen | 118 | (5) |
| 1991–1999 | Borussia Dortmund | 170 | (5) |
| 1999–2000 | 1. FC Nürnberg | 14 | (0) |
| Total | | 302 | (10) |

International career
| 1987 | West Germany U20 | 5 | (2) |
| 1988–1990 | West Germany U21 | 12 | (2) |
| 1988–1992 | Germany | 7 | (0) |

Managerial career
- 2004–2006: TuS Niederense
Medal record
Representing West Germany
Men's football
FIFA World Youth Championship
| Runner-up | 1987 Chile |
- * Club domestic league appearances and goals

Knut Reinhardt (born 27 April 1968) is a German former professional footballer who played as a midfielder.

== Club career ==
Born in Hilden, North Rhine-Westphalia, Reinhardt played 14 consecutive seasons in the Bundesliga, starting in 1985–86 with Bayer 04 Leverkusen. He made his debut in the competition on 19 April 1986 by playing 17 minutes in a 0–0 away draw against FC Bayern Munich, and scored his first goal on 13 June of the following year in a 1–1 draw at Bayer 05 Uerdingen where he was also sent off.

Reinhardt appeared in 32 official games in the 1987–88 campaign, including eight in the team's victorious run in the UEFA Cup. In the 1991 summer he moved to Borussia Dortmund, where he remained for the next eight years.

Reinhardt contributed with 47 matches to Borussia's back-to-back national championship conquests of 1995 and 1996. He left in January 1999 to 1. FC Nürnberg, featuring sparingly for his new club as it eventually suffered relegation as third from bottom and retiring altogether at the end of the following season.

== International career ==
Reinhardt won seven caps for Germany, during four years. He made his debut on 21 September 1988 in a friendly with the Soviet Union, coming on as a 46th-minute substitute for Hans Pflügler in the 1–0 win in Düsseldorf.

== Personal life ==
Reinhardt and his wife, Conny, fathered a boy named Lasse. After the divorce the son was adopted by her new husband, fellow footballer Jens Lehmann.

After his football career, Reinhardt started working as an elementary school teacher.

== Honours ==
Bayer Leverkusen

- UEFA Cup: 1987–88

Borussia Dortmund

- Bundesliga: 1994–95, 1995–96
- UEFA Champions League: 1996–97
- Intercontinental Cup: 1997
- UEFA Cup: runner-up 1992–93
- UEFA Super Cup: runner-up 1997
- DFL-Supercup: 1995

West Germany U20

- FIFA U-20 World Cup: runner-up 1987
