= Stefan Klos =

German footballer

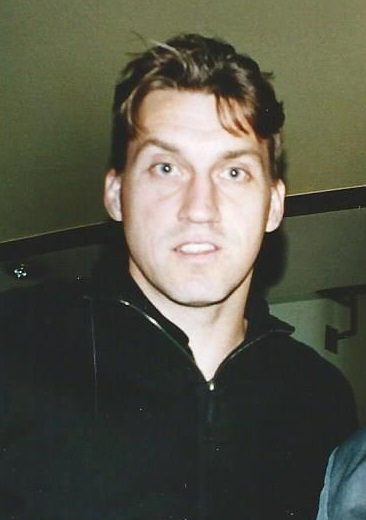
- Klos in 2005

Personal information
- Full name: Stefan Klos
- Date of birth: 16 August 1971 (age 55)
- Place of birth: Dortmund, West Germany
- Height: 1.82 m (6 ft 0 in)
- Position: Goalkeeper

Youth career
- TuS Eving-Lindenhorst
- Eintracht Dortmund

Senior career*
Years	Team	Apps	(Gls)
1990–1998	Borussia Dortmund	254	(0)
1998–2007	Rangers	208	(0)
Total		462	(0)

International career
1991–1993	Germany U21	17	(0)
1992	Germany U23	2	(0)
- * Club domestic league appearances and goals

Stefan Klos (born 16 August 1971) is a German former professional footballer who played as a goalkeeper.

His seventeen-year career was spent with Borussia Dortmund and Rangers. He won 16 major trophies in total, including four Scottish Premier League titles and the 1997 Champions League.

== Club career ==
=== Borussia Dortmund ===
Born in Dortmund, Klos arrived at Borussia Dortmund in the summer of 1990, from neighbouring TSC Eintracht Dortmund. He made his Bundesliga debut on 4 May 1991 at only 19, in a 2–2 home draw against SG Wattenscheid 09.

Klos became first choice in 1991–92, relegating Wolfgang de Beer to the bench. He totalled 31 games for the campaign as his team finished runners-up, going on to win back-to-back national championships during his spell.

As well as playing every match in 1996–97 for the third-placed side, Klos added 11 in that season's UEFA Champions League as they won the tournament for the first time. He left the club with 339 competitive appearances, and 114 clean sheets.

=== Rangers ===
On 24 December 1998, Klos signed with Scottish club Rangers on a contract that made him one of the highest-earning players in Europe. He replaced Lionel Charbonnier as starter and was nicknamed 'Der Goalie', a play on Andy Goram's nickname 'The Goalie'. He won his first Scottish Premier League title that season.

Rangers won the treble in 2002–03, with Klos again the starter. He did not concede a single goal in the league between 25 August and 28 September 2002.

Klos was appointed team captain in July 2004. Six months later, he picked up a knee ligament injury in training, missing the remainder of the season and being replaced by Ronald Waterreus; the Dutchman retained his place after he regained full fitness.

Klos looked set to challenge new signing Lionel Letizi after Paul Le Guen's arrival at the start of 2006–07, but he suffered a biking injury which gave long-term third choice Allan McGregor the chance to play. On 22 February 2007, he made his first appearance of the season for the first team against Hapoel Tel Aviv FC in the round of 32 of the UEFA Cup, after McGregor was sent off in a 4–0 home win.

Klos left Ibrox Stadium at the end of the campaign after eight and a half years, having played 298 matches in all competitions. He retired at the age of 36, and subsequently settled in Switzerland.

In 2009, Klos was inducted into the club's Hall of Fame.

== Honours ==
Borussia Dortmund

- Bundesliga: 1994–95, 1995–96
- UEFA Champions League: 1996–97
- Intercontinental Cup: 1997
- DFL-Supercup: 1995, 1996
- UEFA Cup runner-up: 1992–93

Rangers

- Scottish Premier League: 1998–99, 1999–00, 2002–03, 2004–05
- Scottish Cup: 1998–99, 1999–2000, 2001–02, 2002–03
- Scottish League Cup: 2001–02, 2002–03
