= Andreas Möller =

German footballer (born 1967)

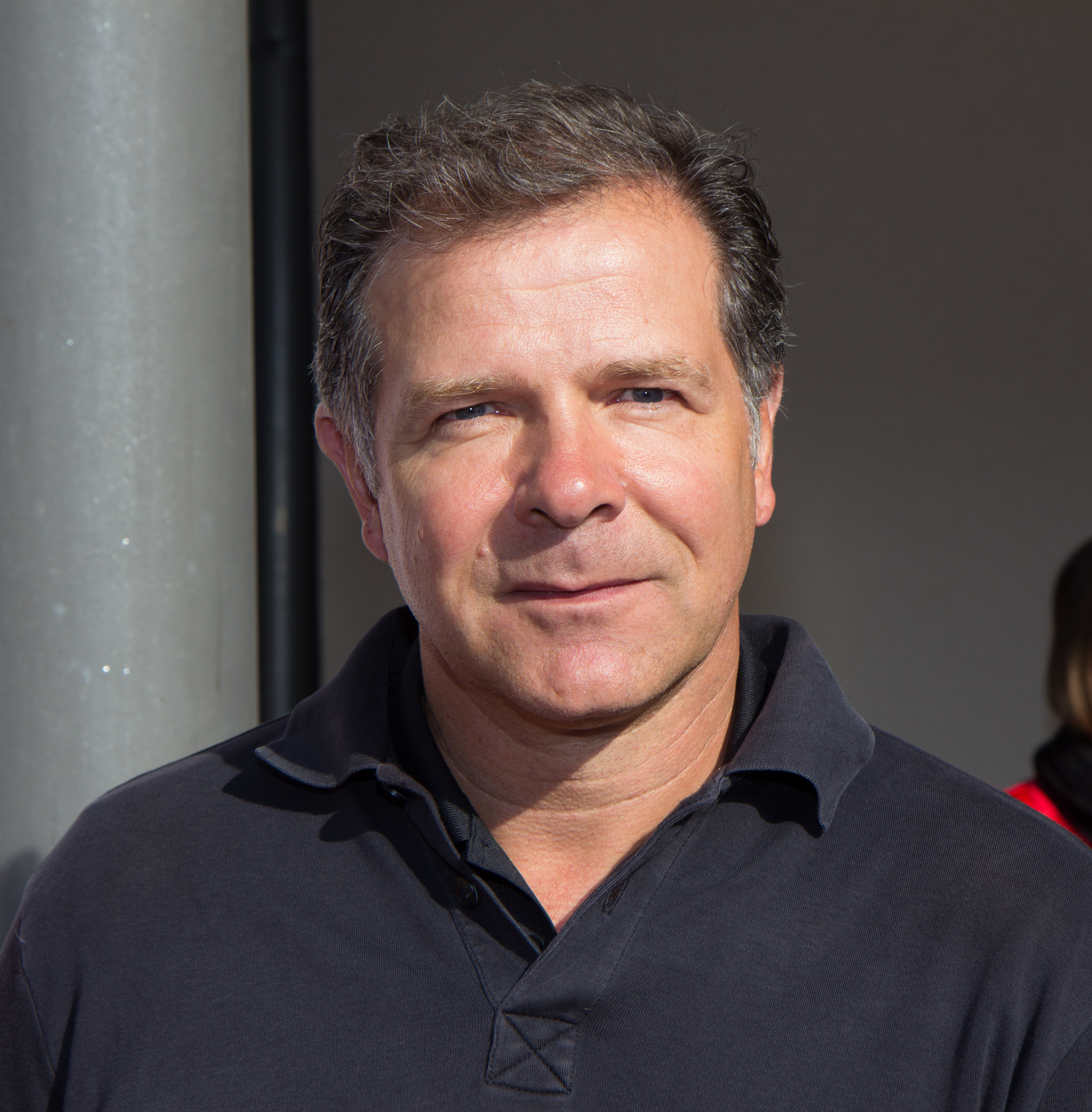
- Möller in 2018

Personal information
- Date of birth: 2 September 1967 (age 59)
- Place of birth: Frankfurt, West Germany
- Height: 1.80 m (5 ft 11 in)
- Position: Attacking midfielder

Team information
- Current team: Eintracht Frankfurt (head of youth)

Youth career
- 1973–1981: BSC Schwarz-Weiß 1919 Frankfurt
- 1981–1985: Eintracht Frankfurt

Senior career*
Years	Team	Apps	(Gls)
1985–1987	Eintracht Frankfurt	35	(5)
1988–1990	Borussia Dortmund	75	(24)
1990–1992	Eintracht Frankfurt	69	(28)
1992–1994	Juventus	56	(19)
1994–2000	Borussia Dortmund	153	(47)
2000–2003	Schalke 04	86	(6)
2003–2004	Eintracht Frankfurt	11	(0)
Total		485	(129)

International career
1988–1990	West Germany U-21	4	(2)
1988–1999	Germany	85	(29)

Managerial career
- 2007–2008: Viktoria Aschaffenburg
- 2015–2017: Hungary (assistant)
Medal record
Men's football
Representing Germany
FIFA World Cup
Winner	1990 Italy
UEFA European Championship
Winner	1996 England
Runner-up	1992 Sweden
- * Club domestic league appearances and goals

Andreas Möller (born 2 September 1967) is a German former professional footballer who played as an attacking midfielder. He also worked as the head of the youth department at Eintracht Frankfurt for three years, between 2019 and 2022.

From 1985 to 2004 Möller played in 429 Bundesliga games for Eintracht Frankfurt, Borussia Dortmund and FC Schalke 04. During his time in the Bundesliga, he became the first player in league history to reach the landmark of 100 goals and 100 assists each (since matched by Thomas Müller and Marco Reus). Möller also played several seasons in Serie A for Juventus FC. He was a member of the Germany teams that won the 1990 FIFA World Cup and UEFA Euro 1996, and at club level is a Champions League winner, UEFA Cup winner, DFB Cup winner, and multiple German champion.

== Early life ==
Möller was born the son of a warehouse worker and a bank clerk in the St. Marien Hospital in Nordend, Frankfurt. He grew up in the district of Sossenheim as an only child in modest circumstances.

Möller's first club was BSC Schwarz-Weiß 1919 Frankfurt, where his father worked as a youth football coach. His coach there was Klaus Gerster, who became his closest friend and later served as an advisor and negotiator throughout his career.

== Club career ==
At club level, Möller played for Eintracht Frankfurt (1985–87, 1990–92, 2003–04), Borussia Dortmund (1988–90, 1994–2000), Juventus (1992–94), and Schalke 04 (2000–03).

=== Eintracht Frankfurt ===
Möller began his career at BSC Schwarz-Weiß 1919 Frankfurt and moved to Eintracht Frankfurt in 1981. In 1985 the midfielder won the German A-Youth Championship and in the same year he joined the first-team squad, venturing into professional football. He played his first game in Germany's highest football class on the last day of the 1985–86 season in the 0-1 defeat on 26 April 1986 against Hamburger SV. In the following season he came up with 22 missions. He played more and more into the team structure and on Matchday 5 against 1. FC Kaiserslautern he scored his first professional goal in league play when he converted a penalty kick to make it 1-2; it was his only goal of the season. In the 1987–88 season, the youngster, who was good at dribbling, developed into a top performer. In his first game of the season on matchday 5 against Bayer 04 Leverkusen, Möller scored twice.

=== Borussia Dortmund ===
On 17 February 1988, Möller made his debut for Borussia Dortmund, scoring the opening goal against VfL Bochum in the 42nd minute at home; however, the game ended in a 2–1 defeat for the Black and Yellows, despite BVB leading 1–0 up until the 88th minute. On the 26th day of the 1987–88 season, against his future employer, FC Schalke 04, Möller received his first and only red card, but only had to sit out one game. In the 1988–89 DFB Cup season, Möller advanced to the final with his team. There he met SV Werder Bremen. After a clear 4–1 win against the North Germans, his won his first national title during his first spell with the club. He also won the DFL-Supercup with Dortmund in the beginning of the 1989–90 season, where he scored the title-deciding goal in the 88th minute of the final match against Bayern Munich.

=== Second spell at Eintracht Frankfurt and move to Juventus ===
Möller was a top performer at Borussia but returned to Frankfurt in the summer of 1990. In the first year after his return, he scored 16 goals in the Bundesliga, setting a personal record that he would not surpass until the end of his career. In the 1991–92 season he missed out on winning the title with Frankfurt on the final day. The season was overshadowed by disputes within the team. Möller was a frequent target of keeper Uli Stein, on the one hand because of his inconsistency, on the other hand because of the many special contractual conditions.

Möller also wanted to play for Eintracht Frankfurt in the 1992–93 season. However, he had promised the Serie A club Juventus an option right for DM 1.3 million, which the club redeemed in March 1992. The Turin side had resold this option right to Atalanta B.C., whom Möller would have had to join if Juventus FC had not exercised the option themselves. FIFA had to provide clarification: Möller was bound by the option and had to move to Italy on 1 July 1992, for which he had to buy himself out of his contract with Eintracht Frankfurt for DM 5 million.

After moving to Italian side Juventus, he won the UEFA Cup in 1993, beating out his former club, Borussia Dortmund, 6–1 on aggregate, with Möller scoring one of the goals and providing three assists across both legs of the final.

=== Borussia Dortmund (second spell) ===
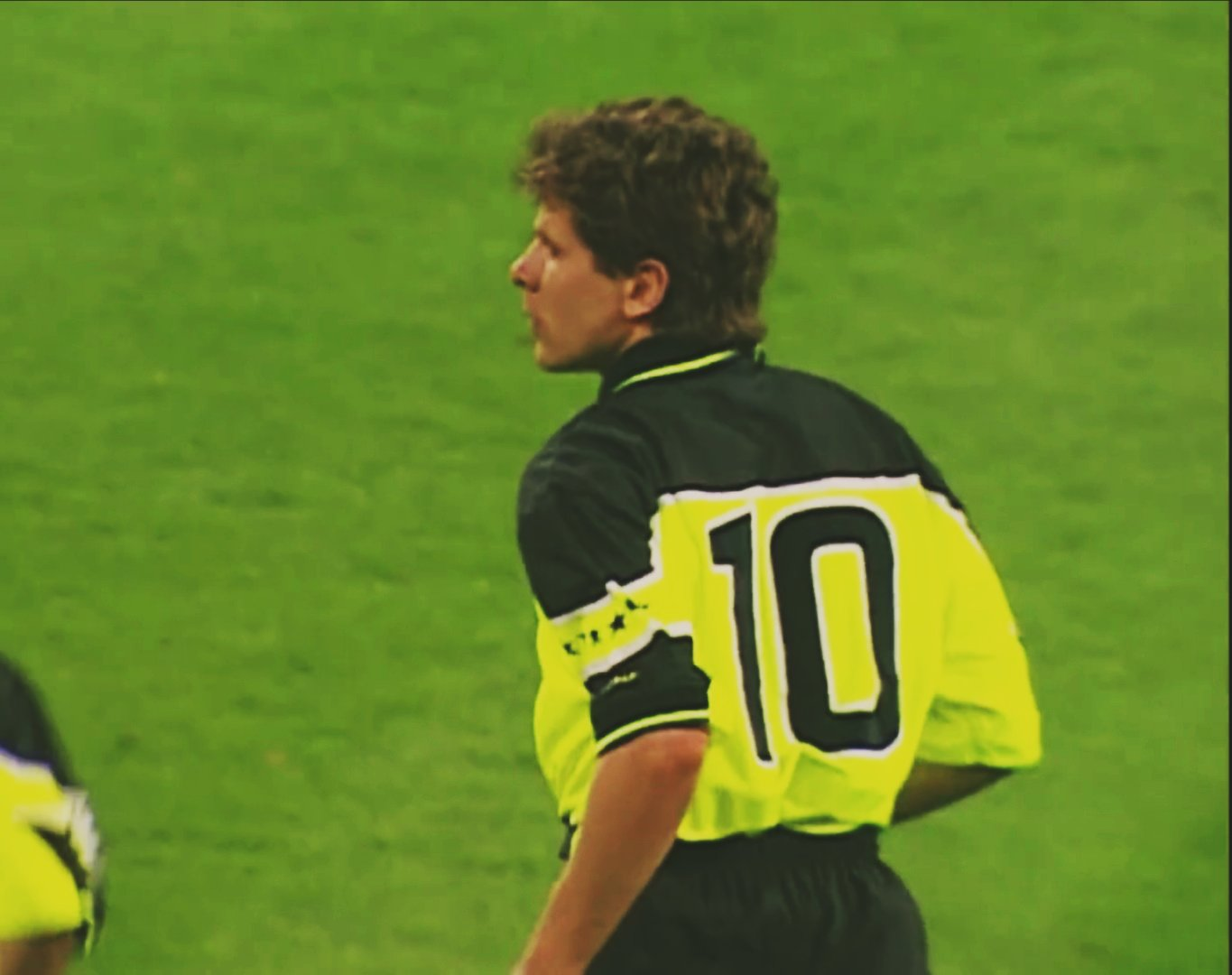
Möller with Borussia Dortmund in 1997

Despite performing well at Juventus, Möller decided to return to Germany in the summer of 1994 and signed for Borussia Dortmund for the second time. Upon his return to Dortmund, he won several domestic titles with the club, including consecutive Bundesliga titles in 1995 and 1996. He stayed with the club for a total of six years, scored goals regularly and had the corresponding deployment times. Especially in the championship years 1995 and 1996, Möller showed his class as a playmaker, creator, and scorer. He was considered one of the most prolific midfielders at the time.

His greatest success at club level came in the 1996–97 Champions League: in the final at Munich's Olympic Stadium on 28 May 1997, and saw him once again beating a former team, Turin side Juventus on this occasion, with a 3–1 victory, providing two assists during the match, while his corner also led to the opening goal. He followed up the victory with the Intercontinental Cup later that year, after which he was named Man of the Match.

During this time, however, there was also controversy and debate surrounding Möller, after he feigned a foul inside the opposing box in a game against Karlsruher SC on 13 April 1995, when BVB had been trailing 0–1. The then wrongly awarded penalty led to the equalising goal (1–1), with the final score ending in an eventual 2–1 win for Dortmund. Möller tried to justify his Schwalbe (a word used for a dive in German football jargon, literally meaning "swallow" in Germany) and attacked the KSC coach at the time, Winfried Schäfer. Möller was sentenced to a two-game ban and a fine of DM 10,000 by the DFB sports court. He was the first player to be banned by the DFB because of a dive. National coach Berti Vogts had to temporarily take him out of the national team due to his ban in the league.

In his last year with the Black and Yellows, Möller only made 18 league appearances, being substituted on or off seven times. Reasons for this were the strong competition from players like Lars Ricken, Christian Nerlinger, Miroslav Stević and Vladimir But as well as minor injuries.

=== Schalke 04 ===
In the summer of 2000, in order to risk a fresh start, Möller decided to sign with arch-rivals Schalke 04 in Dortmund, especially since he received a well-paid offer from Rudi Assauer. Despite criticism, he immediately became a regular there and formed the backbone of Schalke's midfield in his first year with Jörg Böhme, Radoslav Látal and Jiří Němec. Schalke finished second in the Bundesliga at the end of the 2000–01 season, just 1 point behind the Champions Bayern Munich and won the DFB-Pokal. Following season, Schalke successfully defended the DFB-Pokal title after defeating Bayer Leverkusen at the final where Möller scored his team's 3rd goal in a 4–2 victory. After two good years with the Gelsenkirchen side, Möller became more of a supplementary player in the 2002–03 season. Although he made 22 appearances under coaches Frank Neubarth and later Marc Wilmots, he was substituted on or off nine times.

=== Late career and third spell with Eintracht Frankfurt ===
For the 2003–04 season, Möller went back to Hessen to his home club Eintracht Frankfurt, which had just been promoted to the Bundesliga. Celebrated by the fans before the season as a great returnee and a guarantee of success, disillusionment quickly spread. Möller only played eleven league games and only played 90 minutes twice. He also did not manage to help the club avoid relegation. Möller played his last professional game on 28 February 2004, when he came on as a substitute in the 89th minute of the 3-1 win against Borussia Mönchengladbach. Three days later he announced his retirement from professional football, bringing his career to an end.

== International career ==
With the Germany national team, Möller was capped 85 times between 1988 and 1999, scoring 29 goals. He took part at five major international tournaments, winning the 1990 World Cup and Euro 96. He also played for his country at Euro 92, where his team reached the final, only to lose 2–0 to Denmark (although Möller did not feature during the match), as well as the 1994 and 1998 World Cups, in which Germany suffered quarter-final eliminations; in the former edition of the tournament, Germany were eliminated following a surprising 2–1 defeat to Bulgaria, while in the latter edition, Germany lost 3–0 to Croatia. Möller did not play in the 1–0 victory over Argentina in the 1990 World Cup Final and was also suspended for Germany's 2–1 golden goal victory over the Czech Republic in the final of Euro 96 after he was booked in the semi-final against hosts England; in the resulting penalty shoot-out of the latter match, following a 1–1 draw after extra-time, Möller scored the winning penalty, which he celebrated by mimicking the bravado of the pose struck earlier in the shoot-out when Paul Gascoigne had converted his penalty.

== Style of play ==
Described by Stephan Uersfeld of ESPN FC as "one of the greatest midfielders of his generation", Möller was a talented, versatile, and complete advanced playmaker, who was known for his unique sprinting speed - his nickname was "Turbo Möller" (running the 100 metres in 11.2 seconds)- combined with range of passing, creativity, vision, intelligence, and technical ability, as well as his agility, reactions, and his speed of thought and execution, which enabled him to play first–time passes; he also had the ability to carry the ball or run forward at defences while in possession. In addition to his creative capabilities and ability to provide assists to teammates, he was also known for his goalscoring, courtesy of his powerful and accurate striking ability with either foot, as well as his heading ability, which allowed him to excel in the air; his offensive qualities also allowed him to be deployed in more advanced roles, as a supporting striker or even as a winger on occasion, in addition to his usual central position as an attacking midfielder behind the strikers. He was also a free kick specialist.

== After retirement ==
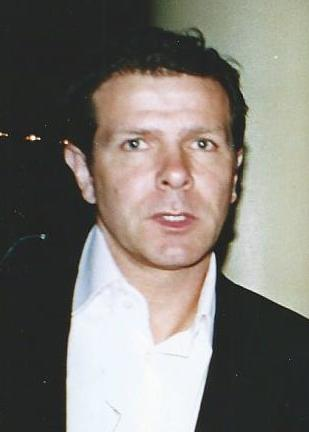
Möller in 2005

After his active career, Möller, together with other former professionals such as Dieter Eilts, obtained a football teacher's license at the German Sport University Cologne. On 20 December 2006 he joined Viktoria Aschaffenburg in the area of sports organization and sponsoring. In June 2007, Möller started his career as football manager at Viktoria Aschaffenburg, playing in the Oberliga Hessen. From 2008 to 2011, he was athletic director for Kickers Offenbach.

On 20 October 2015, Möller was given a job for the Hungary national team. Here he worked as an assistant for Bernd Storck. They played together for Borussia Dortmund when Dortmund won the West German Cup in the 1988–89 season.

On 5 October 2019, Möller returned to Eintracht Frankfurt and was hired as head of the youth department. In order to have more time for his family, he declared in February 2022 that he would not extend his contract beyond the end of the season and would leave the academy after two and a half years. A short time later it was announced that Möller would be leaving on 31 March and that Alexander Richter would take over as his successor on April 1.

== Personal life ==
On 28 April 1992 Möller married a school friend, with whom he has three daughters (born in 1993, 1995, and 2000 respectively). Since the beginning of 2001 he has been in a relationship with another woman, whom he married on 18 August 2007 after his first marriage ended in divorce in 2003.

== Outside of football ==
Möller is a member of the board of trustees of the youth football foundation, which was founded in 2000 by Jürgen Klinsmann, other successful national players and the lecturers of the special football teacher training course.

During the 2006 FIFA World Cup he commented on the games of the German national team for the guests of the club ship AIDA. Möller is credited with a classic of football quotes. When asked in an interview in 1992 where he would play in the future, he is said to have answered: "Milan or Madrid, as long as it's in Italy." In various interviews, Möller stated that he could not remember having made this statement. The sentence was first documented in 1998 in a collage of satirical quotations from Essen's punk rock fanzine Moloko Plus and was made known in Klaus Bittermann's book Vom Feeling her ein gutes Gefühl (1999).

Möller was voted into the BVB Centenary Eleven by the readers of the WAZ media group.

At irregular intervals he worked for television as a co-commentator on football games.

== Media ==
Möller features in EA Sports' FIFA video game series; he was on the cover of the German edition of FIFA 98.

== Career statistics ==
=== Club ===
Appearances and goals by club, season and competition
Club	Season	League			National Cup		League Cup		Continental		Other^{1}		Total	
Club	Season	Division	Apps	Goals	Apps	Goals	Apps	Goals	Apps	Goals	Apps	Goals	Apps	Goals
Eintracht Frankfurt	1985–86	Bundesliga	1	0	–		–		–		–		1	0
Eintracht Frankfurt	1986–87	Bundesliga	22	1	3	2	–		–		–		25	3
Eintracht Frankfurt	1987–88	Bundesliga	12	4	2	1	–		–		–		14	5
Eintracht Frankfurt	Total		35	5	5	3	–		–		–		40	8
Borussia Dortmund	1987–88	Bundesliga	14	3	2	0	–		–		–		16	3
Borussia Dortmund	1988–89	Bundesliga	29	11	5	2	–		–		–		34	13
Borussia Dortmund	1989–90	Bundesliga	32	10	2	0	–		4	0	1	1	39	11
Borussia Dortmund	Total		75	24	9	2	–		4	0	1	1	89	27
Eintracht Frankfurt	1990–91	Bundesliga	32	16	7	2	–		2	1	–		41	19
Eintracht Frankfurt	1991–92	Bundesliga	37	12	2	0	–		4	2	–		43	14
Eintracht Frankfurt	Total		69	28	9	2	–		6	3	–		84	33
Juventus	1992–93	Serie A	26	10	4	4	–		10	4	–		40	18
Juventus	1993–94	Serie A	30	9	1	0	–		7	3	–		38	12
Juventus	Total		56	19	5	4	–		17	7	–		78	30
Borussia Dortmund	1994–95	Bundesliga	30	14	2	0	–		9	3	–		41	17
Borussia Dortmund	1995–96	Bundesliga	23	8	4	1	–		6	2	1	0	34	11
Borussia Dortmund	1996–97	Bundesliga	26	5	1	0	–		9	1	1	0	37	6
Borussia Dortmund	1997–98	Bundesliga	26	10	3	3	2	0	8	3	1	0	40	16
Borussia Dortmund	1998–99	Bundesliga	30	7	2	0	–		–		–		32	7
Borussia Dortmund	1999–00	Bundesliga	18	3	1	0	2	0	7	1	–		28	4
Borussia Dortmund	Total		153	47	13	4	4	0	39	10	3	0	212	61
Schalke 04	2000–01	Bundesliga	32	1	6	1	–		–		–		38	2
Schalke 04	2001–02	Bundesliga	32	4	6	3	2	0	5	1	–		45	8
Schalke 04	2002–03	Bundesliga	22	1	2	0	2	0	3	0	–		29	1
Schalke 04	Total		86	6	14	4	4	0	8	1	–		112	11
Eintracht Frankfurt	2003–04	Bundesliga	11	0	1	0	–		–		–		12	0
Career total			485	129	56	19	8	0	74	21	4	1	627	170

- ^{1} Including appearances in 1989 DFB-Supercup, 1995 DFB-Supercup, 1996 DFB-Supercup and 1997 Intercontinental Cup.

=== International ===
Appearances and goals by national team and year
National team	Year	Apps	Goals
Germany	1988	1	0
Germany	1989	6	2
Germany	1990	7	1
Germany	1991	5	1
Germany	1992	7	1
Germany	1993	10	7
Germany	1994	12	2
Germany	1995	9	5
Germany	1996	12	6
Germany	1997	4	0
Germany	1998	10	4
Germany	1999	2	0
Total		85	29

Scores and results list Germany's goal tally first, score column indicates score after each Möller goal.

List of international goals scored by Andreas Möller
No.	Date	Venue	Opponent	Score	Result	Competition	Ref.
1	4 October 1989	Westfalenstadion, Dortmund, Germany	Finland	1–0	6–1	1990 FIFA World Cup qualification	
2	4 October 1989	Westfalenstadion, Dortmund, Germany	Finland	5–1	6–1	1990 FIFA World Cup qualification	
3	28 February 1990	Stade de la Mosson, Montpellier, France	France	1–0	1–2	Friendly	
4	16 October 1991	Frankenstadion, Nuremberg, Germany	Wales	1–0	4–1	UEFA Euro 1992 qualifying	
5	20 December 1992	Estadio Centenario, Montevideo, Uruguay	Uruguay	2–0	4–1	Friendly	
6	14 April 1993	Ruhrstadion, Bochum, Germany	Ghana	6–1	6–1	Friendly	
7	10 June 1993	RFK Stadium, Washington, D.C., United States	Brazil	2–3	3–3	Friendly	
8	22 September 1993	El Menzah Stadium, Tunis, Tunisia	Tunisia	1–0	1–1	Friendly	
9	13 October 1993	Wildparkstadion, Karlsruhe, Germany	Uruguay	2–0	5–0	Friendly	
10	17 November 1993	Müngersdorfer Stadion, Cologne, Germany	Brazil	2–1	2–1	Friendly	
11	15 December 1993	Miami Orange Bowl, Miami, United States	Argentina	1–1	1–2	Friendly	
12	18 December 1993	Stanford Stadium, Stanford, United States	United States	1–0	3–0	Friendly	
13	2 June 1994	Ernst-Happel-Stadion, Vienna, Austria	Austria	2–0	5–1	Friendly	
14	2 June 1994	Ernst-Happel-Stadion, Vienna, Austria	Austria	4–0	5–1	Friendly	
15	23 June 1995	Wankdorf Stadium, Bern, Switzerland	Switzerland	2–1	2–1	Friendly	
16	23 August 1995	King Baudouin Stadium, Brussels, Belgium	Belgium	1–0	2–1	Friendly	
17	6 September 1995	Frankenstadion, Nuremberg, Germany	Georgia	1–1	4–1	UEFA Euro 1996 qualifying	
18	8 October 1995	Ulrich-Haberland-Stadion, Leverkusen, Germany	Moldova	4–0	6–1	UEFA Euro 1996 qualifying	
19	8 October 1995	Ulrich-Haberland-Stadion, Leverkusen, Germany	Moldova	5–0	6–1	UEFA Euro 1996 qualifying	
20	21 February 1996	Estádio das Antas, Porto, Portugal	Portugal	1–0	2–1	Friendly	
21	21 February 1996	Estádio das Antas, Porto, Portugal	Portugal	2–1	2–1	Friendly	
22	4 June 1996	Carl-Benz-Stadion, Mannheim, Germany	Liechtenstein	1–0	9–1	Friendly	
23	4 June 1996	Carl-Benz-Stadion, Mannheim, Germany	Liechtenstein	7–0	9–1	Friendly	
24	9 June 1996	Old Trafford, Manchester, England	Czech Republic	2–0	2–0	UEFA Euro 1996	
25	9 November 1996	Frankenstadion, Nuremberg, Germany	Northern Ireland	1–1	1–1	1998 FIFA World Cup qualification	
26	22 February 1998	King Fahd International Stadium, Riyadh, Saudi Arabia	Saudi Arabia	1–0	3–0	Friendly	
27	22 April 1998	Müngersdorfer Stadion, Cologne, Germany	Nigeria	1–0	1–0	Friendly	
28	30 May 1998	Waldstadion, Frankfurt, Germany	Colombia	3–0	3–1	Friendly	
29	15 June 1998	Parc des Princes, Paris, France	United States	1–0	2–0	1998 FIFA World Cup	

== Honours ==
Eintracht Frankfurt

- German A youth champion: 1985

Borussia Dortmund

- Bundesliga: 1994–95, 1995–96
- DFB-Pokal: 1988–89
- DFB-Supercup: 1989, 1995, 1996
- UEFA Champions League: 1996–97
- Intercontinental Cup: 1997

Juventus

- UEFA Cup: 1992–93

Schalke 04

- DFB-Pokal: 2000–01, 2001–02

Germany

- FIFA World Cup: 1990
- UEFA European Championship: 1996; runner-up: 1992
- U.S. Cup: 1993

Individual

- kicker Bundesliga Team of the Season: 1988–89, 1989–90, 1990–91, 1991–92, 1995–96, 2000–01
- Bundesliga top assist provider: 1989–90, 1995–96
- kicker Bundesliga-best offensive midfielder: 1990, 1991
- Intercontinental Cup MVP of the Match Award: 1997
