= David Sauerland =

German footballer

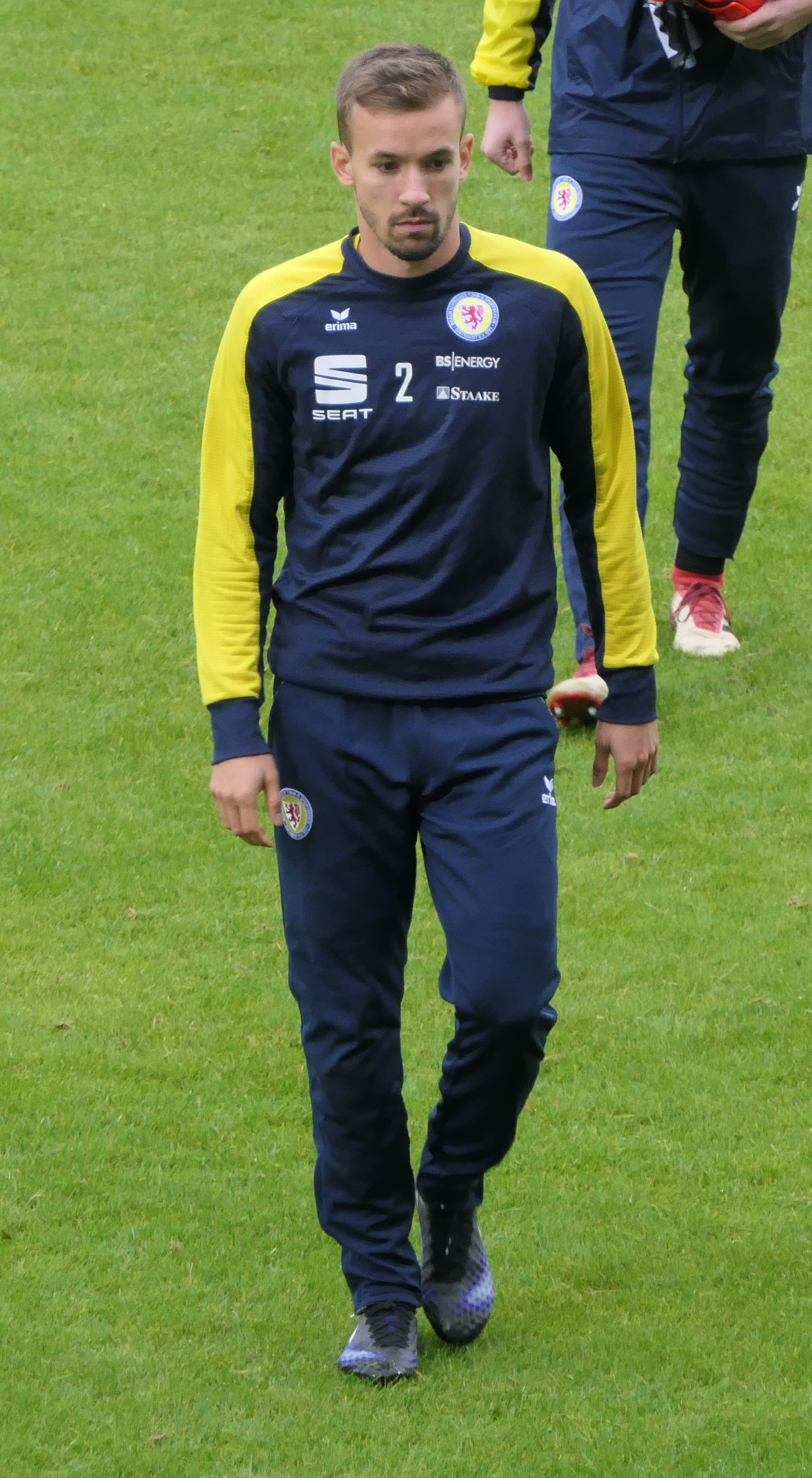
- Sauerland with Eintracht Braunschweig in September 2018

Personal information
- Date of birth: 28 June 1997 (age 29)
- Place of birth: Münster, Germany
- Height: 1.80 m (5 ft 11 in)
- Position: Right back

Team information
- Current team: Preußen Münster II
- Number: 12

Youth career
- –2011: 1. FC Gievenbeck
- 2011–2013: Preußen Münster
- 2013–2016: Borussia Dortmund

Senior career*
Years	Team	Apps	(Gls)
2015–2018	Borussia Dortmund II	61	(0)
2018–2019	Eintracht Braunschweig	15	(0)
2019–2022	Rot-Weiss Essen	25	(0)
2022–2023	Alemannia Aachen	12	(1)
2023–	Preußen Münster II	6	(0)

International career
2013	Germany U16	2	(0)
2013–2014	Germany U17	5	(0)
2014–2015	Germany U18	5	(1)
2016	Germany U20	4	(0)
- * Club domestic league appearances and goals as of 23 May 2024

David Sauerland (born 28 June 1997) is a German professional footballer who plays as a defender for Preußen Münster II in Oberliga Westfalen.
