= Jörg Sauerland =

German footballer

Personal information
- Date of birth: 24 December 1976 (age 49)
- Place of birth: Dortmund, West Germany
- Height: 1.84 m (6 ft 0 in)
- Position: Left-back

Senior career*
Years	Team	Apps	(Gls)
1995–2001	Borussia Dortmund (A)		
1997–1998	Borussia Dortmund	2	(0)
2001–2004	KFC Uerdingen	68	(4)
2004	Kickers Emden	7	(1)
2004–2006	SSV Hagen		
2006–2007	ASC 09 Dortmund		
- * Club domestic league appearances and goals

Jörg Sauerland (born 24 December 1976) is a German former professional footballer who played as a left-back.

== Honours ==
- Intercontinental Cup: 1997
