= Martin Kree =

German former footballer (born 1965)

Personal information
- Full name: Martin Kree
- Date of birth: 27 January 1965 (age 61)
- Place of birth: Wickede, West Germany
- Height: 1.84 m (6 ft 0 in)
- Position: Defender

Youth career
- –1980: TuS Wickede
- 1980–1983: VfL Bochum

Senior career*
Years	Team	Apps	(Gls)
1983–1984	VfL Bochum II		
1983–1989	VfL Bochum	164	(28)
1989–1994	Bayer Leverkusen	156	(22)
1994–1998	Borussia Dortmund	81	(1)

International career
1984–1985	West Germany U-21	5	(0)
1986	West Germany B	1	(0)
Medal record
VfL Bochum
Runner-up	DFB-Pokal	1987–88
Bayer 04 Leverkusen
Winner	DFB-Pokal	1992–93
Borussia Dortmund
Winner	Bundesliga	1994–95
Winner	Bundesliga	1995–96
Winner	UEFA Champions League	1996–97
Winner	Intercontinental Cup	1997
- * Club domestic league appearances and goals

Martin Kree (born 27 January 1965) is a German former footballer, who played mostly as a central defender.

During a 15-year professional career, Kree played 401 Bundesliga games for VfL Bochum, Bayer 04 Leverkusen and Borussia Dortmund.

== Career ==
Born in Wickede, North Rhine-Westphalia, Kree made his first division debuts with VfL Bochum in 1983–84 – seven matches, one goal – netting an impressive 12 goals in his sixth season (only three penalty kicks), while only missing six matches in his last four seasons combined.

After a further five seasons with Bayer 04 Leverkusen, playing in all 38 league matches with nine goals in the first campaign with teams from the re-unified Germany, Kree moved to Borussia Dortmund, where he won back-to-back league championships, the 1997 Champions League and the Intercontinental Cup, also in that year. During the club's Champions League victorious campaign, he played in eight matches (six complete, including the final).

Kree retired from football in 1998, aged 33.

== Career statistics ==
Appearances and goals by club, season and competition
Club	Season	League			DFB-Pokal		Europe		Total	
Club	Season	Division	Apps	Goals	Apps	Goals	Apps	Goals	Apps	Goals
VfL Bochum II	1983–84	Oberliga			–		–			
VfL Bochum	1983–84	Bundesliga	7	1	1	0	–		8	1
VfL Bochum	1984–85	Bundesliga	27	2	3	0	–		30	2
VfL Bochum	1985–86	Bundesliga	33	2	5	0	–		38	2
VfL Bochum	1986–87	Bundesliga	32	4	1	0	–		33	4
VfL Bochum	1987–88	Bundesliga	32	7	4	1	–		36	8
VfL Bochum	1988–89	Bundesliga	33	12	3	0	–		36	12
VfL Bochum	Total		164	28	17	1	0	0	181	29
Bayer Leverkusen	1989–90	Bundesliga	34	7	2	0	–		36	7
Bayer Leverkusen	1990–91	Bundesliga	32	2	2	1	6	0	40	3
Bayer Leverkusen	1991–92	Bundesliga	38	9	5	0	–		43	9
Bayer Leverkusen	1992–93	Bundesliga	34	4	7	2	–		41	6
Bayer Leverkusen	1993–94	Bundesliga	18	0	3	1	4	0	25	1
Bayer Leverkusen	Total	Bundesliga	156	22	19	4	10	0	185	26
Borussia Dortmund	1994–95	Bundesliga	24	1	1	0	7	0	32	1
Borussia Dortmund	1995–96	Bundesliga	23	0	3	0	5	1	31	1
Borussia Dortmund	1996–97	Bundesliga	21	0	0	0	8	0	29	0
Borussia Dortmund	1997–98	Bundesliga	13	0	2	1	4	0	19	1
Borussia Dortmund	Total		81	1	6	1	24	1	111	3
Career total			401	51	42	6	34	1	477	58
