= Harry Decheiver =

Dutch footballer

Personal information
- Date of birth: 8 March 1970 (age 56)
- Place of birth: Deventer, Netherlands
- Height: 1.86 m (6 ft 1 in)
- Position: Forward

Senior career*
| Years | Team | Apps | (Gls) |
| 1986–1990 | Go Ahead Eagles | 92 | (25) |
| 1990–1991 | Heerenveen | 30 | (4) |
| 1991–1995 | RKC | 63 | (33) |
| 1995–1996 | Go Ahead Eagles | 27 | (15) |
| 1996–1997 | SC Freiburg | 41 | (17) |
| 1997 | Utrecht | 12 | (8) |
| 1997–1999 | Borussia Dortmund | 8 | (3) |
| Total | | 283 | (105) |
Medal record
Borussia Dortmund
| Winner | Intercontinental Cup | 1997 |
| Runner-up | UEFA Super Cup | 1997 |
- * Club domestic league appearances and goals

Harry Decheiver (born 8 March 1970) is a Dutch retired footballer who played as a striker in the Netherlands and Germany.

After having played four seasons for Go Ahead Eagles (1986–1990) he served SC Heerenveen (1990–1991), RKC (1991–1994), Go Ahead Eagles (1995), SC Freiburg (1995–1997), FC Utrecht (1997) and, finally, Borussia Dortmund (1997–1999). He retired early due to injury. He later worked in various positions at Go Ahead Eagles.

== Club career ==
=== SC Freiburg ===
Decheiver joined Bundesliga side SC Freiburg from Go Ahead Eagles in winter 1995 for a reported transfer fee of DM 700,000, signing a contract until 1997. Upon his arrival, the club ranked last in the Bundesliga table but finished the season in 11th spot with Decheiver contributing 11 goals. Two of these goals came in March 1996 as Freiburg managed a rare win against Bayern Munich. In March 1997, Decheiver agreed to the termination of his contract parting in anger with the club. He had been criticised for his lack of defensive work while his teammates had accused him of "arrogant und provocative" behaviour and spoken out in favour of his rivals Uwe Wassmer and Uwe Spies. Freiburg was relegated from the Bundesliga at the end of 1996–97 season. During his time at Freiburg, he was nicknamed "Knipser" and scored a total of 21 goals in 49 appearances for the club across all competitions.

=== Utrecht ===
In April 1997, Decheiver surprisingly returned to the Netherlands joining FC Utrecht. He rejected offers from 1. FC Köln, VfB Stuttgart, and SBV Vitesse. He signed a four-year contract and formed a formidable partnership with Michael Mols.

=== Borussia Dortmund ===
In November 1997, Decheiver signed a three-and-a-half-year contract with Borussia Dortmund. The transfer fee paid to Utrecht was reported as DM2.7 million. Wieht Dortmund, Decheiver won the 1997 Intercontinental Cup.

== Honours ==
Borussia Dortmund

- Intercontinental Cup: 1997
