= 1997 Intercontinental Cup =

- Match programme cover
Borussia Dortmund	Cruzeiro
(Germany)	(Brazil)
2	0
- Date: 2 December 1997
- Venue: National Stadium, Tokyo
- Man of the Match: Andreas Möller (Borussia Dortmund)
- Referee: José María García-Aranda (Spain)
- Attendance: 46,953

The 1997 Intercontinental Cup was an association football match played on 2 December 1997 between Borussia Dortmund, winners of the 1996–97 UEFA Champions League, and Cruzeiro, winners of the 1997 Copa Libertadores. The match was played at the neutral venue of the National Stadium in Tokyo in front of 46,953 fans. Andreas Möller was named as man of the match.

== Teams ==
Team	Qualification	Previous participation (bold indicates winners)
(Germany) Borussia Dortmund	1996–97 UEFA Champions League winners	None
(Brazil) Cruzeiro	1997 Copa Libertadores winners	1976

== Venue ==
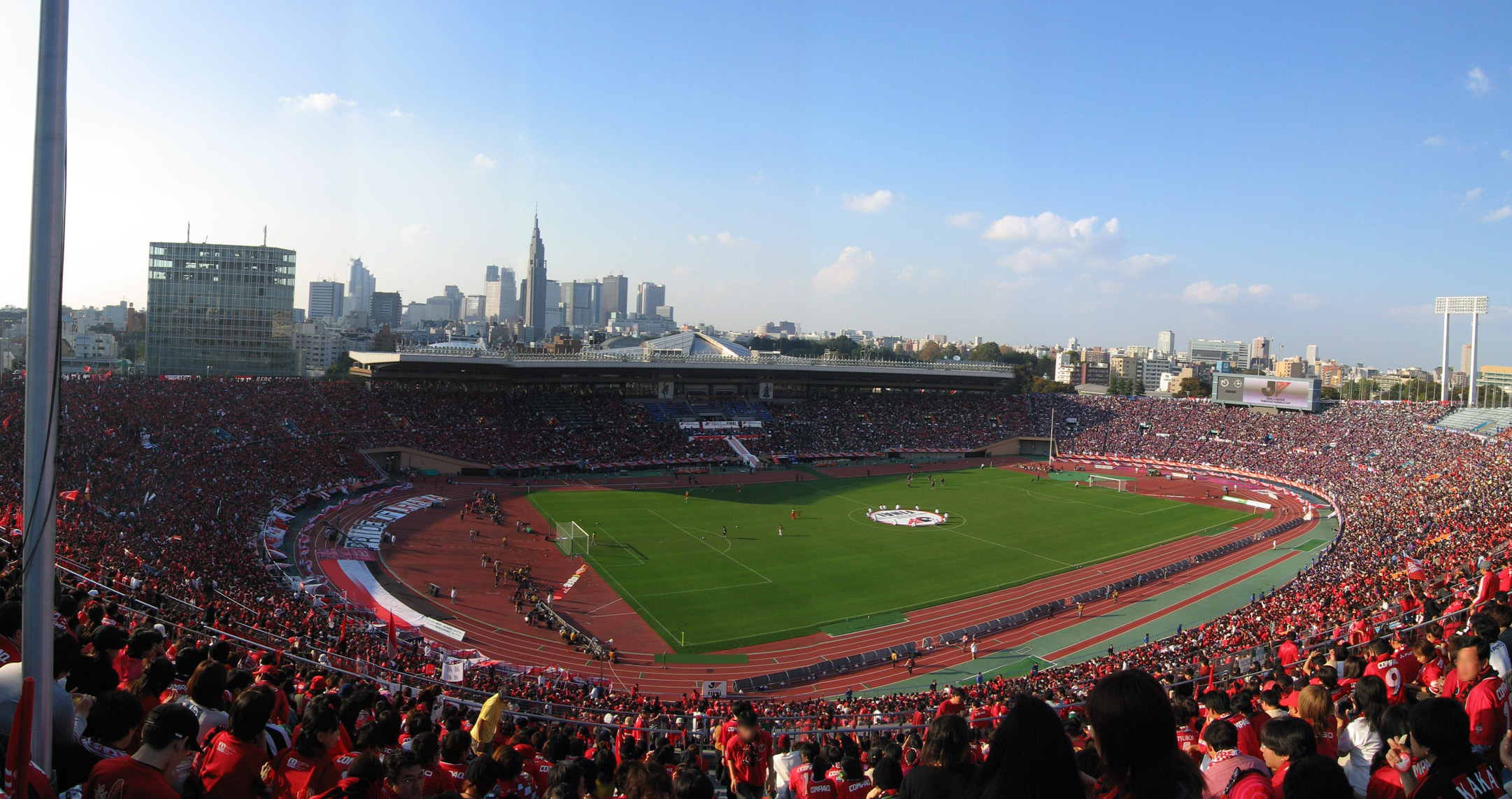
The National Stadium in Tokyo hosted the match

== Match details ==
2 December 1997
19:10 JST

Borussia Dortmund (Germany)	2–0	(Brazil) Cruzeiro
Zorc 34'; Herrlich 85'	Report

National Stadium, Tokyo
Attendance: 46,953
Referee: José María García-Aranda (Spain)

**Borussia Dortmund**	**Cruzeiro**

GK	1	(Germany) Stefan Klos
RB	7	(Germany) Stefan Reuter (c)	(yellow card) 54'
CB	27	(Austria) Wolfgang Feiersinger
CB	5	(Brazil) Júlio César
LB	17	(Germany) Jörg Heinrich
DM	4	(Germany) Steffen Freund
CM	19	(Portugal) Paulo Sousa
CM	8	(Germany) Michael Zorc		(substituted off) 80'
AM	10	(Germany) Andreas Möller	(yellow card) 18'
CF	9	(Switzerland) Stéphane Chapuisat		(substituted off) 75'
CF	11	(Germany) Heiko Herrlich	(yellow card) 83'
Substitutes:
GK	12	(Germany) Wolfgang de Beer
DF	16	(Germany) Martin Kree
DF	23	(Germany) Jörg Sauerland
MF	2	(Germany) Knut Reinhardt
FW	20	(Scotland) Scott Booth
FW	24	(Netherlands) Harry Decheiver		(substituted on) 75'
FW	30	(United States) Jovan Kirovski		(substituted on) 80'
Manager:
(Italy) Nevio Scala

GK	1	(Brazil) Dida
RB	2	(Brazil) Vítor	(yellow card) 15' (red card) 66'
CB	13	(Brazil) João Carlos
CB	4	(Brazil) Gonçalves
LB	6	(Brazil) Elivélton
DM	5	(Brazil) Fabinho
DM	8	(Brazil) Ricardinho
AM	9	(Brazil) Cleisson (c)
AM	10	(Peru) Roberto Palacios		(substituted off) 64'
CF	7	(Brazil) Bebeto
CF	11	(Brazil) Donizete
Substitutes:
GK	12	(Brazil) Jean
DF	14	(Brazil) Nonato
DF	16	(Brazil) Alberto
DF	23	(Brazil) Gélson Baresi
MF	18	(Brazil) Marcelo Ramos		(substituted on) 64'
MF	19	(Brazil) Donizete Amorim
FW	17	(Brazil) Geovanni
Manager:
(Brazil) Nelsinho Baptista

Man of the Match:
Andreas Möller (Borussia Dortmund)

Assistant referees:
Jeon Young-Hyun (South Korea)
Yoshikazu Hiroshima (Japan)
Fourth official:
Masayoshi Okada (Japan)

**Match rules**

- 90 minutes.
- 30 minutes of golden goal extra time if necessary.
- Penalty shoot-out if scores still level.
- Seven named substitutes.
- Maximum of three substitutes.

Match Ball

- The Ball of the match was the Adidas Questra, originally designed to be the official match ball of the 1994 FIFA World Cup in the United States.

== See also ==
- 1997 UEFA Champions League final
- 1997 Copa Libertadores finals
- Borussia Dortmund in international football
