= Bashiru Gambo =

Ghanaian footballer

Personal information
- Date of birth: 24 September 1978 (age 48)
- Place of birth: Kumasi, Ghana
- Height: 1.74 m (5 ft 9 in)
- Position: Forward

Youth career
- –1992: King Faisal Babes

Senior career*
Years	Team	Apps	(Gls)
1992–2002	Borussia Dortmund II	108	(22)
1997–2000	→ Borussia Dortmund	8	(0)
2002–2003	SSV Reutlingen	33	(3)
2003–2004	Karlsruher SC	5	(0)
2004–2005	Wydad Casablanca		
2005–2009	Stuttgarter Kickers	123	(23)
2009–2010	Erzgebirge Auge	12	(0)
2011	Jahn Regensburg	10	(0)
2011–2012	VfR Mannheim	22	(1)
Total		321	(47)

International career
1995	Ghana U-17	5	(1)
1997	Ghana U-20	7	(1)
2000–2003	Ghana	4	(0)
- * Club domestic league appearances and goals

Bashiru Gambo (born 24 September 1978) is a Ghanaian footballer who played as a forward for Black Stars. He currently resides in the United States.
