= Christian Timm =

German former professional football (born 1979)

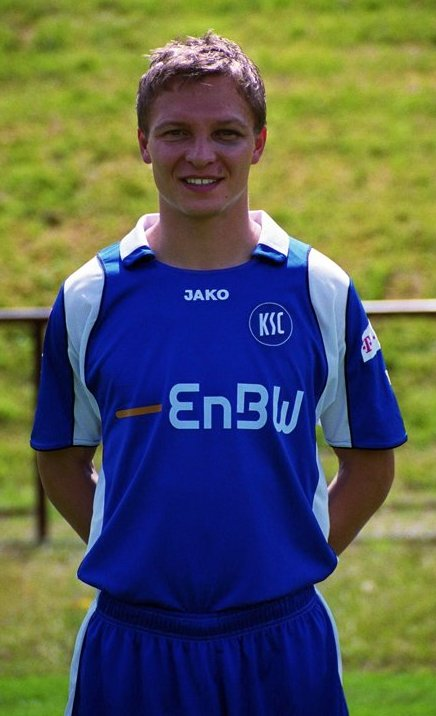
- Timm in 2007

Personal information
- Full name: Christian Timm
- Date of birth: 27 February 1979 (age 47)
- Place of birth: Herten, West Germany
- Height: 1.80 m (5 ft 11 in)
- Position: Striker

Youth career
- 1984–1986: SV Westerholt
- 1986–1992: SG Herten-Langenbochum
- 1992–1996: Borussia Dortmund

Senior career*
| Years | Team | Apps | (Gls) |
| 1996–1999 | Borussia Dortmund II | 50 | (25) |
| 1996–1999 | Borussia Dortmund | 15 | (0) |
| 1999–2002 | 1. FC Köln | 68 | (15) |
| 2002–2004 | 1. FC Kaiserslautern | 26 | (2) |
| 2005–2007 | Greuther Fürth | 81 | (21) |
| 2007–2012 | Karlsruher SC | 76 | (6) |
| 2011–2012 | Karlsruher SC II | 3 | (0) |
| Total | | 319 | (69) |

International career
| 1999–2001 | Germany U-21 | 10 | (4) |
| 2003 | Germany Team 2006 | 1 | (0) |
- * Club domestic league appearances and goals

Christian Timm (born 27 February 1979) is a German former professional football who played as a striker.

== Career ==
Starting his career at Dortmund in 1996 he managed just 15 appearances for the club and eventually moved to 2. Bundesliga club 1. FC Köln where he went on to make 65 appearances in his three years at the club scoring 15 goals and helping the club gain promotion into the Bundesliga. He was tipped for national team selection but a series of injuries meant he was regularly out of action. In 2002, he moved to 1. FC Kaiserslautern and then on to SpVgg Greuther Fürth two years later where he made over 81 appearances for the club and netted 21 goals.

His good performances attracted several Bundesliga clubs and Timm decided to move to Karlsruher SC in July 2007, where he signed a three-year contract. On 27 June 2009, his contract was extended until 30 June 2012. In July 2011, the club told Timm that he would not be part of the squad any longer, yet all subsequent attempts to reach mutual consent on an earlier termination of his contract failed. Timm made use of his right to participate in the training sessions but he had not been given a shirt number for the 2011–12 season. He was restored to the squad but was released by KSC at the end of the season
