= René Schneider (German footballer) =

German footballer

Personal information
- Date of birth: 1 February 1973 (age 53)
- Place of birth: Schwerin, East Germany
- Height: 1.87 m (6 ft 2 in)
- Position: Defender

Youth career
- Motor Schwerin
- ISG Schwerin
- 1. FC Magdeburg

Senior career*
Years	Team	Apps	(Gls)
1989–1993	1. FC Magdeburg	58	(4)
1993–1994	BSV Brandenburg	23	(5)
1994–1996	Hansa Rostock	62	(12)
1996–1999	Borussia Dortmund	11	(3)
1999–2001	Hansa Rostock	11	(1)
2001–2002	Hamburger SV	0	(0)
2002–2004	VfL Osnabrück	3	(0)
2004–2007	SV Warnemünde		

International career
1995–1996	Germany U-21	8	(1)
1995–1996	Germany	1	(0)
Medal record
Men's football
Representing Germany
UEFA European Championship
Winner	1996 England
- * Club domestic league appearances and goals

René Schneider (born 1 February 1973) is a German former professional footballer who played as a defender.

== Club career ==
Schneider played mostly for Hansa Rostock. During his time at Borussia Dortmund he gained a Champions League medal in 1997, making one appearance en route to the final. This came against Auxerre in the quarterfinal first leg, a game in which he also scored. He was, however, left off of the squad for the final altogether.

== International career ==
At international level, Schneider played one match for Germany national team in 1995 against South Africa and was an unused squad member of the team that won the 1996 UEFA European Championship.
