= Wolfgang de Beer =

German footballer (1964–2024)

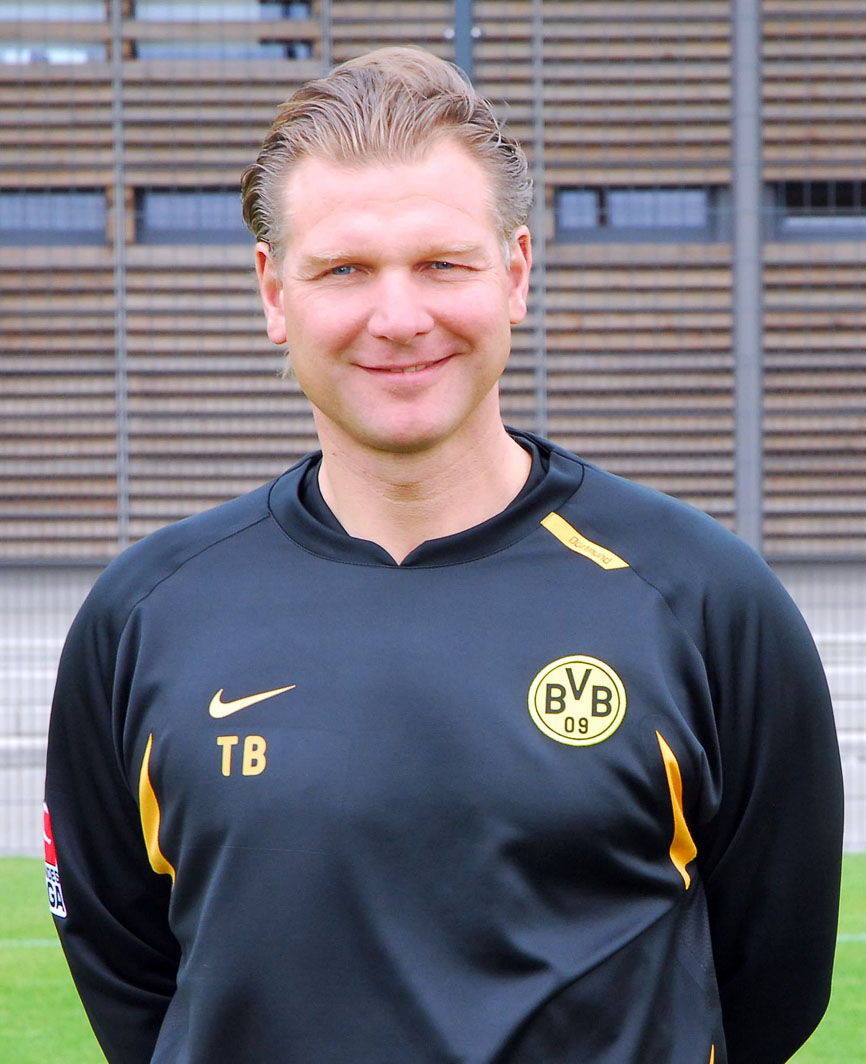
- De Beer in 2007

Personal information
- Date of birth: 2 January 1964
- Place of birth: Dinslaken, North Rhine-Westphalia, West Germany
- Date of death: 30 December 2024 (aged 60)
- Height: 1.81 m (5 ft 11 in)
- Position: Goalkeeper

Youth career
- TV Jahn Hiesfeld

Senior career*
Years	Team	Apps	(Gls)
1981–1986	MSV Duisburg	62	(0)
1986–2001	Borussia Dortmund	181	(0)

International career
1984	West Germany U21	1	(0)

Managerial career
- 2001–2018: Borussia Dortmund (goalkeeper coach)
- 2018–2024: Borussia Dortmund (fan relations manager)
- * Club domestic league appearances and goals

Wolfgang "Teddy" de Beer (2 January 1964 – 30 December 2024) was a German professional footballer who played as a goalkeeper for MSV Duisburg and Borussia Dortmund.

== Career ==
De Beer started his career with TV Jahn Hiesfeld, before joining MSV Duisburg, making his Bundesliga debut for them on 22 May 1982.

He worked as a goalkeeping coach at his former club Borussia Dortmund up until his retirement in 2018.

== Death ==
De Beer died on 30 December 2024, at the age of 60.

== Honours ==
Borussia Dortmund

- DFB-Pokal: 1988–89
- DFB-Supercup: 1989
- Bundesliga: 1994–95, 1995–96
- UEFA Champions League: 1996–97
- Intercontinental Cup: 1997
