= Frank Riethmann =

German footballer

Personal information
- Date of birth: 9 December 1975 (age 50)
- Place of birth: Germany
- Height: 1.87 m (6 ft 2 in)
- Position: Midfielder

Senior career*
Years	Team	Apps	(Gls)
1994–2001	Borussia Dortmund II		
1994–1998	Borussia Dortmund	5	(0)

International career
- Germany U20
- * Club domestic league appearances and goals

Frank Riethmann (born 9 December 1975) is a German former professional footballer who played as a midfielder. He represented the Germany U20 national team at the 1995 FIFA World Youth Championship.
