= Steffen Freund =

German footballer (born 1970)

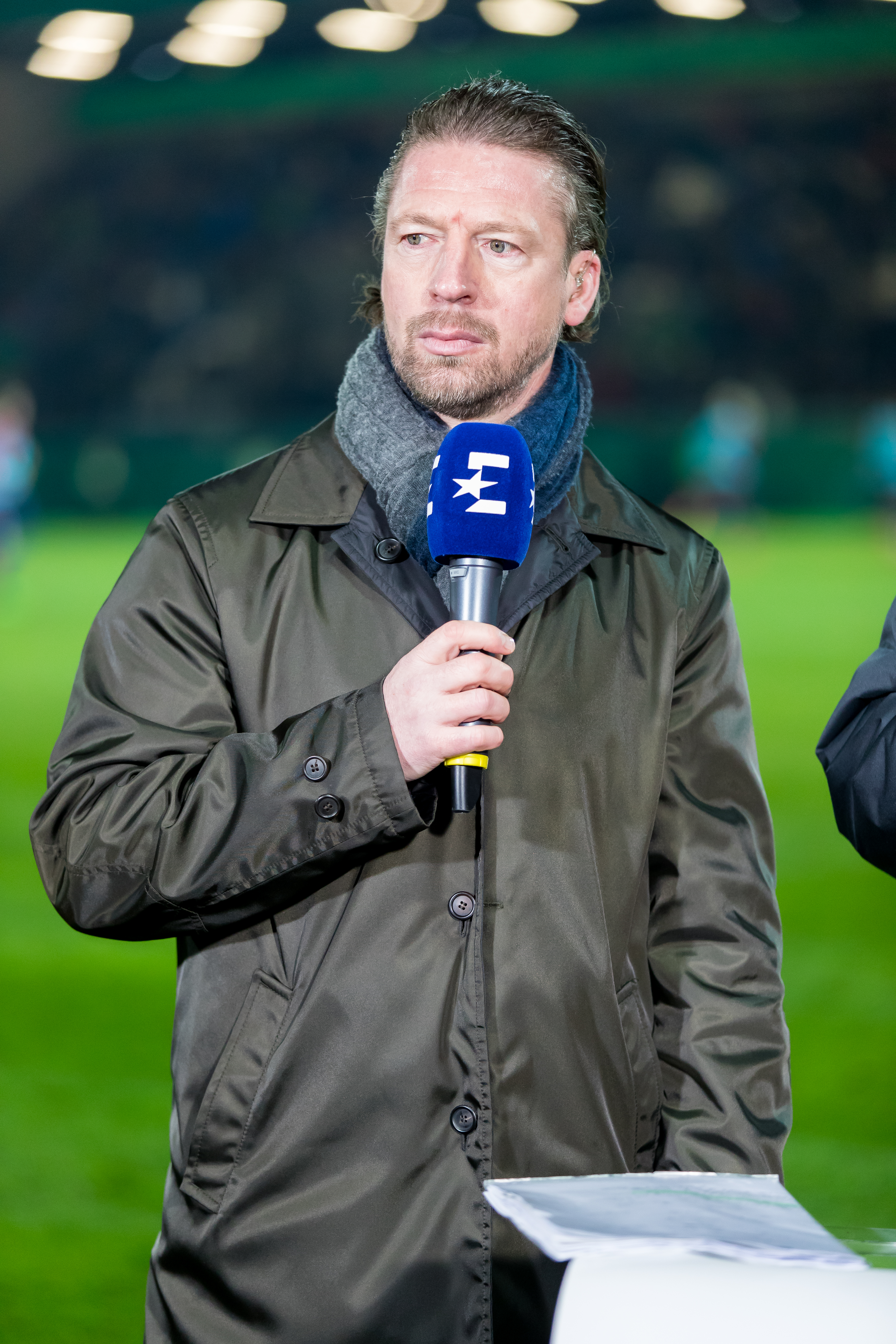
- Freund in 2017

Personal information
- Date of birth: 19 January 1970 (age 56)
- Place of birth: Brandenburg, East Germany
- Height: 1.80 m (5 ft 11 in)
- Position: Defensive midfielder

Youth career
- 1976–1984: BSG Motor Süd Brandenburg
- 1984–1989: BSG Stahl Brandenburg

Senior career*
Years	Team	Apps	(Gls)
1989–1991	BSG Stahl Brandenburg	57	(0)
1991–1993	Schalke 04	53	(3)
1993–1998	Borussia Dortmund	117	(6)
1998–2003	Tottenham Hotspur	102	(0)
2003–2004	1. FC Kaiserslautern	9	(0)
2004	→ Leicester City (loan)	14	(0)
Total		352	(9)

International career
1989	East Germany U21	1	(0)
1989–1990	East Germany Olympic	7	(1)
1992	Germany Olympic	2	(0)
1995–1998	Germany	21	(0)

Managerial career
- 2009–2012: Germany U16
- 2010–2011: Germany U17
- 2012–2014: Tottenham Hotspur (assistant)
Medal record
Men's football
Representing Germany (as player)
UEFA European Championship
Winner	1996
Representing Germany (as manager)
FIFA U-17 World Cup
Bronze medal – third place	2011
- * Club domestic league appearances and goals

Steffen Freund (born 19 January 1970) is a German former professional footballer who played as a defensive midfielder in both the German and English top flights. He was capped 21 times for his country and played a significant part in Germany's UEFA Euro 1996 winning campaign.

== Club career ==
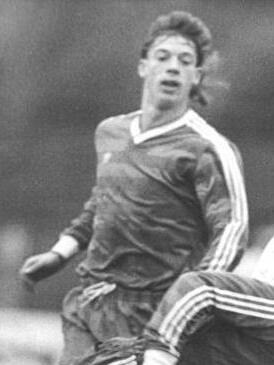
Freund with BSG Stahl Brandenburg in 1990

Freund started his career at Stahl Brandenburg, coming through their youth system. He has said that the Stasi made an unsuccessful attempt to recruit him as an informer during his time at the club. In 1991, he was transferred to FC Schalke 04 and he established himself as an important midfield player. Schalke were forced to sell Freund due to financial reasons in 1993 to Borussia Dortmund where he stayed until 1998. During his time at Dortmund, he won the league twice in 1995 and 1996 and gained a Champions League medal in 1997, but was left out of the squad for the final altogether.

In December 1998, Freund transferred to English Premiership club Tottenham Hotspur. During his time with the London club, he won the League Cup in 1999, starting in the centre of midfield in Spurs's 1–0 win over Leicester City. He stayed at the club until 2003, and despite never scoring a goal in 131 appearances across all competitions, he became a firm fans favourite at the club for his heart, work ethic and commitment. On 4 December 2009, Freund was inducted into the Tottenham Hotspur hall of fame alongside Darren Anderton.

At the tail end of his career he went on to have short spells at 1. FC Kaiserslautern and Leicester City.

== International career ==
Between 1995 and 1998, he won 21 caps for the Germany national team. He won UEFA Euro 1996 with Germany, where he missed out on a place in the final because of an injury in their semi-final win over England. He also appeared at the 1998 FIFA World Cup, where Germany fell at the quarter-final stage to Croatia; Freund was an unused substitute in the match.

== Coaching career ==
On 1 September 2007, Freund was appointed assistant head-coach of the German U-20 team.

On 5 December 2007, he was named as a new assistant to Nigeria coach Berti Vogts for the time of the African Nations Cup. He then resumed his work as assistant to German U20-manager Frank Engel. In May 2009 he finished his coaching badges and on 17 July 2009 he was appointed manager of the German U-16 team signing a two-year contract. A year later he began managing the German U-17 team leading them to a runners up medal at the 2011 UEFA European U-17 Football Championship and a third place at the World Cup in Mexico. He then started working with the new generation of U-16 players. On 11 July 2012, Freund was appointed assistant head coach of Tottenham Hotspur. On 5 August 2014 he was appointed International Technical Coordinator.

On 21 April 2017, while on Sky Sports, Freund stated that he was not interested in getting back into coaching. He instead was enjoying the freedom from pressure which he was experiencing as a pundit.

== Television career ==
In 2006, he appeared alongside Boris Becker in a special England v. Germany edition of the popular panel show They Think It's All Over. At the start of the 2011–12 season, Freund began working as a pundit for Eurosport's coverage of the German Bundesliga and Sky Deutschland. He is also a co-commentator for the English world feed of the Bundesliga.

== Personal life ==
Freund is married and has one son and two daughters. His son, Niklas, was as a football goalkeeper for SV Empor Berlin FC, having previously played for VCD Athletic and Redbridge, before switched over in May 2018 to American football as wide receiver for the Berlin Bears, Berlin Adler Academy and currently at Berlin Rebels in the German Football League.

== Honours ==
Borussia Dortmund

- Bundesliga: 1994–95, 1995–96
- DFB-Supercup: 1995
- UEFA Champions League: 1996–97
- Intercontinental Cup: 1997

Tottenham Hotspur

- Football League Cup: 1998–99

Germany

- European Championship: 1996

Individual

- Tottenham Hotspur Hall of Fame: December 2009 Inductee
