= 1995–96 Bundesliga =

33rd season of the Bundesliga

Bundesliga
- Season: 1995–96
- Dates: 11 August 1995 – 18 May 1996
- Champions: Borussia Dortmund; 2nd Bundesliga title 5th German title
- Relegated: Kaiserslautern; Eintracht Frankfurt; KFC Uerdingen 05
- Champions League: Borussia Dortmund
- Cup Winners' Cup: Kaiserslautern
- UEFA Cup: Bayern Munich; Schalke 04; Borussia Mönchengladbach; Hamburg
- Intertoto Cup: Karlsruhe; 1860 Munich; Werder Bremen; Stuttgart
- Goals: 815
- Average goals/game: 2.66
- Top goalscorer: Fredi Bobic (17)
- Biggest home win: Dortmund 6–0 Frankfurt (23 March 1996)
- Biggest away win: Uerdingen 1–6 Bayern (25 February 1996); Stuttgart 0–5 Dortmund (16 March 1996)
- Highest scoring: Dortmund 6–3 Stuttgart (9 goals) (16 September 1995)

The 1995–96 Bundesliga was the 33rd season of the Bundesliga, Germany's premier football league. It began on 11 August 1995 and ended on 18 May 1996. Borussia Dortmund were the defending champions.

== Competition format ==
Every team played two games against each other team, one at home and one away. This was the first season where teams received three points for a win (instead of two), and one point for a draw. If two or more teams were tied on points, places were determined by goal difference and, if still tied, by goals scored. The team with the most points were crowned champions while the three teams with the fewest points were relegated to 2. Bundesliga.

== Team changes to 1994–95 ==
VfL Bochum and MSV Duisburg were relegated to the 2. Bundesliga after finishing in 16th and 17th place respectively. Dynamo Dresden, who ended the season in last place, were denied a professional license by the DFB and thus relegated to the third-tier Regionalliga. All demoted teams were replaced by 2. Bundesliga sides FC Hansa Rostock, FC St. Pauli and Fortuna Düsseldorf.

Bayer 05 Uerdingen were renamed KFC Uerdingen 05 due to the retreat of main sponsor Bayer.

== Team overview ==
Location of teams in Bundesliga 1995–96

Club	Location	Ground	Capacity
SV Werder Bremen	Bremen	Weserstadion	30,000
Borussia Dortmund	Dortmund	Westfalenstadion	42,800
Fortuna Düsseldorf	Düsseldorf	Rheinstadion	55,850
Eintracht Frankfurt	Frankfurt	Waldstadion	62,000
SC Freiburg	Freiburg	Dreisamstadion	22,500
Hamburger SV	Hamburg	Volksparkstadion	62,000
1. FC Kaiserslautern	Kaiserslautern	Fritz-Walter-Stadion	38,500
Karlsruher SC	Karlsruhe	Wildparkstadion	40,000
1. FC Köln	Cologne	Müngersdorfer Stadion	55,000
Bayer 04 Leverkusen	Leverkusen	Ulrich-Haberland-Stadion	26,800
Borussia Mönchengladbach	Mönchengladbach	Bökelbergstadion	34,500
TSV 1860 Munich	Munich	Olympiastadion	63,000
FC Bayern Munich	Munich	Olympiastadion	63,000
FC Hansa Rostock	Rostock	Ostseestadion	25,850
FC Schalke 04	Gelsenkirchen	Parkstadion	70,000
FC St. Pauli	Hamburg	Stadion am Millerntor	20,550
VfB Stuttgart	Stuttgart	Gottlieb-Daimler-Stadion	53,700
Bayer 05 Uerdingen	Krefeld	Grotenburg-Stadion	34,500

== League table ==
Pos	Team	Pld	W	D	L	GF	GA	GD	Pts	Qualification or relegation
1	Borussia Dortmund (C)	34	19	11	4	76	38	+38	68	Qualification to Champions League group stage
2	Bayern Munich	34	19	5	10	66	46	+20	62	Qualification to UEFA Cup first round
3	Schalke 04	34	14	14	6	45	36	+9	56	Qualification to UEFA Cup first round
4	Borussia Mönchengladbach	34	15	8	11	52	51	+1	53	Qualification to UEFA Cup first round
5	Hamburger SV	34	12	14	8	52	47	+5	50	Qualification to UEFA Cup first round
6	Hansa Rostock	34	13	10	11	47	43	+4	49	
7	Karlsruher SC	34	12	12	10	53	47	+6	48	Qualification to Intertoto Cup group stage (Note: As Hansa Rostock did not apply for the UEFA Intertoto Cup, their place was transferred to Stuttgart.)
8	1860 Munich	34	11	12	11	52	46	+6	45	Qualification to Intertoto Cup group stage
9	Werder Bremen	34	10	14	10	39	42	−3	44	Qualification to Intertoto Cup group stage
10	VfB Stuttgart	34	10	13	11	59	62	−3	43	Qualification to Intertoto Cup group stage
11	SC Freiburg	34	11	9	14	30	41	−11	42	
12	1. FC Köln	34	9	13	12	33	35	−2	40	
13	Fortuna Düsseldorf	34	8	16	10	40	47	−7	40	
14	Bayer Leverkusen	34	8	14	12	37	38	−1	38	
15	FC St. Pauli	34	9	11	14	43	51	−8	38	
16	1. FC Kaiserslautern (Note: After being demoted by league place, Kaiserslautern won the DFB-Pokal 1995–96 and thus qualified for the Cup Winners' Cup.) (R)	34	6	18	10	31	37	−6	36	Cup Winners' Cup and relegation to 2. Bundesliga
17	Eintracht Frankfurt (R)	34	7	11	16	43	68	−25	32	Relegation to 2. Bundesliga
18	KFC Uerdingen (R)	34	5	11	18	33	56	−23	26	Relegation to 2. Bundesliga

Source: www.dfb.de
Rules for classification: 1) points; 2) goal difference; 3) number of goals scored.
(C) Champions; (R) Relegated

== Results ==
Home \ Away	SVW	BVB	F95	SGE	SCF	HSV	FCK	KSC	KOE	B04	BMG	M60	FCB	ROS	S04	STP	VFB	KFC
Werder Bremen	—	2–2	1–1	1–1	0–2	2–1	1–1	1–0	0–1	2–1	2–0	2–0	3–2	0–2	1–2	1–1	2–2	1–0
Borussia Dortmund	1–1	—	3–0	6–0	3–2	1–1	1–1	4–1	3–0	2–0	2–1	3–1	3–1	1–2	0–0	1–0	6–3	5–0
Fortuna Düsseldorf	1–1	1–2	—	2–2	0–0	2–2	2–1	2–0	1–1	1–1	3–2	1–1	0–2	2–2	2–0	2–0	1–2	1–0
Eintracht Frankfurt	1–0	3–4	3–0	—	0–1	1–4	3–1	2–2	1–0	1–1	0–2	4–2	4–1	1–3	0–3	2–2	2–2	1–0
SC Freiburg	0–1	0–1	1–1	2–0	—	0–3	0–0	0–3	2–0	2–1	0–0	1–0	3–1	2–1	1–2	0–2	2–1	1–1
Hamburger SV	3–3	2–2	4–1	5–1	0–0	—	1–0	0–0	0–0	2–2	2–1	2–2	2–1	1–1	1–1	1–0	3–0	0–0
1. FC Kaiserslautern	0–0	1–1	2–0	1–1	1–2	1–2	—	2–2	1–1	1–0	1–3	0–0	2–3	2–0	0–0	0–0	1–1	3–0
Karlsruher SC	1–1	5–0	3–1	1–1	1–1	3–1	0–0	—	1–0	1–4	4–0	1–1	2–6	0–2	0–1	2–2	1–2	2–0
1. FC Köln	1–2	0–0	0–0	3–0	1–1	3–2	0–1	0–1	—	2–2	0–2	2–0	0–0	3–0	0–1	1–0	2–2	0–0
Bayer Leverkusen	2–2	1–1	0–0	2–0	0–1	0–1	1–1	1–2	1–2	—	0–0	2–1	1–2	2–0	0–0	1–1	0–0	2–1
Borussia Mönchengladbach	1–0	2–2	1–1	4–1	1–0	1–2	1–1	1–2	2–1	0–0	—	0–2	3–1	3–2	4–1	2–4	1–1	2–1
1860 Munich	1–1	2–2	2–1	3–1	3–0	5–0	1–1	1–1	2–1	0–1	4–0	—	0–2	1–1	1–1	2–0	1–1	2–1
Bayern Munich	2–0	1–0	2–2	1–1	2–0	3–2	2–0	1–4	3–2	1–0	1–2	4–2	—	0–1	4–0	1–1	5–3	2–0
Hansa Rostock	2–1	3–2	0–0	1–1	1–0	2–0	3–0	1–1	0–1	1–2	2–3	0–3	0–0	—	1–2	2–0	3–3	1–0
Schalke 04	2–1	1–2	1–1	2–0	3–0	3–0	1–1	2–1	0–0	1–1	3–3	1–1	2–1	1–3	—	2–0	2–0	1–1
FC St. Pauli	1–2	0–3	2–1	2–1	1–1	1–1	1–2	1–1	3–3	2–1	0–2	4–2	0–1	3–2	2–0	—	1–3	0–2
VfB Stuttgart	1–1	0–5	2–3	3–2	3–1	3–0	2–0	3–1	0–1	1–4	5–0	2–3	0–1	1–1	2–2	1–1	—	0–0
KFC Uerdingen	3–0	0–2	1–3	1–1	3–1	1–1	1–1	2–3	1–1	3–0	0–2	2–0	1–6	1–1	1–1	2–5	3–4	—

Source: DFB
Legend: Blue = home team win; Yellow = draw; Red = away team win.

== Top goalscorers ==
17 goals

- (Germany) Fredi Bobic (VfB Stuttgart)

16 goals

- (Germany) Sean Dundee (Karlsruher SC)
- (Brazil) Giovane Élber (VfB Stuttgart)
- (Germany) Jürgen Klinsmann (FC Bayern Munich)

15 goals

- (Sweden) Martin Dahlin (Borussia Mönchengladbach)
- (Germany) Michael Zorc (Borussia Dortmund)

14 goals

- (Germany) Olaf Bodden (TSV 1860 Munich)
- (Germany) Harald Spörl (Hamburger SV)

11 goals

- (Germany) Mario Basler (SV Werder Bremen)
- (Germany) Stefan Beinlich (FC Hansa Rostock)
- (Netherlands) Harry Decheiver (SC Freiburg)
- (Germany) Martin Max (FC Schalke 04)
- (Netherlands) Erik Meijer (KFC Uerdingen 05)
- (Austria) Toni Polster (1. FC Köln)

== Attendances ==
No.	Team	Attendance	Change	Highest
1	Bayern München	59,471	9.8%	69,000
2	Borussia Dortmund	43,994	2.8%	48,800
3	Schalke 04	38,310	-3.9%	70,960
4	1. FC Kaiserslautern	36,400	-2.1%	38,500
5	TSV 1860	35,512	16.1%	70,800
6	1. FC Köln	32,882	3.5%	54,000
7	Borussia Mönchengladbach	31,232	-0.5%	34,500
8	VfB Stuttgart	31,189	-1.6%	53,218
9	Eintracht Frankfurt	29,776	-0.5%	57,300
10	Hamburger SV	27,959	-8.2%	57,000
11	Werder Bremen	27,870	-13.5%	30,000
12	Hansa Rostock	26,836	179.7%	58,492
13	Karlsruher SC	26,806	-7.1%	33,800
14	Fortuna 95	25,079	159.7%	55,850
15	SC Freiburg	22,500	28.6%	22,500
16	Bayer Leverkusen	22,041	0.5%	26,500
17	FC St. Pauli	21,988	27.8%	51,432
18	KFC Uerdingen	14,536	-16.2%	34,500
