= 1992–93 FC Bayern Munich season =

93rd season in existence of Bayern Munich

Bayern Munich
1992–93 season
- Manager: Erich Ribbeck
- Stadium: Olympiastadion
- Bundesliga: 2nd
- DFB-Pokal: Second round
- Top goalscorer: League: Bruno Labbadia (11); All: Bruno Labbadia (14)
Home colours	Away colours

The 1992–93 FC Bayern Munich season was the 93rd season in the club's history and 28th season since promotion from Regionalliga Süd in 1965. Bayern finished its Bundesliga campaign in second place behind SV Werder Bremen by one point. The club held first place until matchday 33 when the club fell to second. In the DFB-Pokal, Bayern made it to the second round when the club was eliminated by Borussia Dortmund. The team was managed by Erich Ribbeck. Due to the previous season finish of tenth place in the Bundesliga, the club did not compete in any UEFA sanctioned competitions.

== Results ==
=== Friendlies ===
==== Trofeo Dino Viola ====
31 July 1992 1	A.S. Roma	1–0	Bayern Munich	Rome
	Carnevale 88'			Stadium: Stadio Olimpico

2 August 1992 2	ACF Fiorentina	4–1	Bayern Munich	Rome
	Effenberg 3', 50'; Laudrup 12'; Mazinho 85'		Labbadia 59'	Stadium: Stadio Olimpico

28 September 1992 Friendly	Sevilla	3–1	Bayern Munich	Sevilla, Spain
				Stadium: Estadio Ramón Sánchez Pizjuán

5 February 1993 Winter break	Basel	1–5	Bayern Munich	Maspalomas, Gran Canaria, Canary Islands
21:00	Uccella 78' (1:4)	Summary	9' (0:1) Wohlfarth; 20' (0:2) Wohlfarth; 45' (0:3) Wohlfarth; 70' (0:4) Wohlfarth; 82' (1:5) Labbadia	Attendance: 2,000; Referee: (Spain) Garcia, (Gran Canaria)

=== Bundesliga ===
==== League results ====
Match	Date	Ground	Opponent	Score^{1}	Pos.	Pts.	GD	Report
1	15 August	A	FC Bayer 05 Uerdingen	3 – 0	1	2	3	Report / Report link; Kick off / 15:30 CEST; Attendance / 26,000; Referee / Norbert Haupt; FC Bayer 05 Uerdingen / Bayern Munich; Peschke (red card) 77'; Klein (yellow card) / Thon 21'; Schupp 83'; Helmer 86'; Jorginho (yellow card); Kreuzer (yellow card)
2	22 August	H	1. FC Kaiserslautern	1 – 0	1	4	4	Report / Report link; Kick off / 15:30 CEST; Attendance / 64,000; Referee / Wieland Ziller; Bayern Munich / 1. FC Kaiserslautern; Labbadia 20'; Grahammer (yellow card); Scholl (yellow card); Ziege (yellow card)
4	29 August	H	Dynamo Dresden	3 – 1	1	6	6	Report / Report link; Kick off / 15:30 CEST; Attendance / 30,000; Referee / Kurt Witke; Bayern Munich / Dynamo Dresden; Jorginho 49'; Labbadia 76', 78'; Oliveira (yellow card) / Gütschow 88' (pen.); Wagenhaus (yellow card)
5	2 September	A	1. FC Köln	3 – 1	1	8	8	Report / Report link; Kick off / 20:00 CEST; Attendance / 37,000; Referee / Hartmut Strampe; 1. FC Köln / Bayern Munich; Ordenewitz 68'; Baumann (yellow card) / Kreuzer 32' (yellow card); Wouters 44'; Ziege 78'; Helmer (yellow card)
6	5 September	H	Hamburger SV	4 – 0	1	10	12	Report / Report link; Kick off / 15:30 CEST; Attendance / 30,000; Referee / Gerhard Theobald; Bayern Munich / Hamburger SV; Ziege 51'; Wohlfarth 54'; Helmer 59'; Mazinho 64' / Weichert (yellow card)
7	19 September	H	SG Wattenscheid 09	1 – 1	1	11	12	Report / Report link; Kick off / 15:30 CEST; Attendance / 51,000; Referee / Michael Malbranc; Bayern Munich / SG Wattenscheid 09; Thon 38' (pen.); Scholl (yellow card) 63' (red card); Kreuzer (yellow card); Schupp (yellow card); Matthäus (yellow card) / Sané 90'; Bach (yellow card); Prinzen (yellow card); Tschiskale (yellow card)
8	25 September	A	Borussia Dortmund	2 – 1	1	13	13	Report / Report link; Kick off / 20:00 CEST; Attendance / 41,800; Referee / Bernd Heynemann; Borussia Dortmund / Bayern Munich; Rummenigge 85'; Zelic (yellow card) / Helmer 31'; Kreuzer 61' (yellow card); Matthäus (yellow card)
9	3 October	H	Borussia Mönchengladbach	2 – 2	1	14	13	Report / Report link; Kick off / 15:30 CET; Attendance / 64,000; Referee / Karl-Heinz Gläser; Bayern Munich / Borussia Mönchengladbach; Thon 52' (pen.); Helmer 88'; Scholl (yellow card) / Criens 26' (yellow card); Mølby (yellow card) 45' (red card); Max 90'; Schneider (yellow card)
10	17 October	A	1. FC Saarbrücken	1 – 1	1	15	13	Report / Report link; Kick off / 15:30 CET; Attendance / 36,000; Referee / Hellmut Krug; 1. FC Saarbrücken / Bayern Munich; Kristl 27'; Kostner (yellow card); Eichmann (yellow card) / Kreuzer 51'; Wouters (yellow card)
11	24 October	H	Werder Bremen	1 – 3	1	15	11	Report / Report link; Kick off / 15:30 CET; Attendance / 33,000; Referee / Hans-Peter Dellwing; Bayern Munich / Werder Bremen; Thon 84' (pen.); Jorginho (yellow card); Matthäus (yellow card); Scholl (yellow card) / Rufer 43' (pen.), 65'; Herzog 69'; Wolter (yellow card)
3	27 October	A	Eintracht Frankfurt	1 – 1	1	16	11	Report / Report link; Kick off / 20:00 CET; Attendance / 59,000; Referee / Günther Habermann; Eintracht Frankfurt / Bayern Munich; Bommer 45'; Weber (yellow card) / Kreuzer 50' (yellow card); Wouters (yellow card)
12	31 October	A	VfB Stuttgart	3 – 2	1	18	12	Report / Report link; Kick off / 15:30 CET; Attendance / 55,000; Referee / Karl-Josef Assenmacher; VfB Stuttgart / Bayern Munich; Walter 52' (pen.); Golke 87'; Strunz (yellow card); Eyjólfur (yellow card) / Labbadia 53'; Cerny 61'; Ziege 69'; Kreuzer (yellow card); Thon (yellow card)
13	14 November	H	1. FC Nürnberg	1 – 0	1	20	13	Report / Report link; Kick off / 15:30 CET; Attendance / 64,000; Referee / Hans-Jürgen Weber; Bayern Munich / 1. FC Nürnberg; Helmer 87'; Wouters (yellow card); Thon (yellow card) / Zietsch (yellow card) 77' (red card); Friedmann (yellow card); Fengler (yellow card)
14	21 November	A	Bayer Leverkusen	4 – 2	1	22	15	Report / Report link; Kick off / 15:30 CET; Attendance / 26,900; Referee / Dr. Markus Merk; Bayer Leverkusen / Bayern Munich; Scholz 11'; Thom 87'; Lupescu (yellow card) / Ziege 58'; Matthäus 69'; Wouters 75'; Labbadia 90'; Mazinho (yellow card)
15	28 November	H	Karlsruher SC	3 – 3	1	23	15	Report / Report link; Kick off / 15:30 CET; Attendance / 37,000; Referee / Hartmut Strampe; Bayern Munich / Karlsruher SC; Mazinho 13' (yellow card); Kahn 21' (o.g.); Matthäus 72'; Wouters (yellow card) / Shmarov 32'; Kreuzer 41' (o.g.); Schütterle 84'; Kiriakov (yellow card); Schuster (yellow card)
16	5 December	A	VfL Bochum	2 – 2	1	24	15	Report / Report link; Kick off / 15:30 CET; Attendance / 38,000; Referee / Jürgen F. Wippermann; VfL Bochum / Bayern Munich; Wegmann 1', 71'; Herrmann (yellow card); Milde (yellow card) / Labbadia 47'; Matthäus 89'; Kreuzer (yellow card); Thon (yellow card)
17	12 December	H	Schalke 04	1 – 1	1	25	15	Report / Report link; Kick off / 15:30 CET; Attendance / 37,000; Referee / Günther Habermann; Bayern Munich / Schalke 04; Linke 62' (o.g.) / Freund 53' (yellow card); Gehrke (yellow card)
18	20 February	H	FC Bayer 05 Uerdingen	2 – 0	1	27	17	Report / Report link; Kick off / 15:30 CET; Attendance / 13,000; Referee / Gerhard Theobald; Bayern Munich / FC Bayer 05 Uerdingen; Labbadia 26', 67' / Posch (yellow card)
19	27 February	A	1. FC Kaiserslautern	3 – 1	1	29	19	Report / Report link; Kick off / 15:30 CET; Attendance / 38,000; Referee / Manfred Harder; 1. FC Kaiserslautern / Bayern Munich; Kuntz 72'; Goldbæk (yellow card) / Wohlfarth 9' (yellow card) 78' (red card); Schupp 54'; Jorginho 85'; Thon (yellow card); Matthäus (yellow card)
20	6 March	H	Eintracht Frankfurt	1 – 0	1	31	20	Report / Report link; Kick off / 15:30 CET; Attendance / 63,000; Referee / Eugen Strigel; Bayern Munich / Eintracht Frankfurt; Matthäus 27' (yellow card); Scholl (yellow card) / Tskhadadze (yellow card)
21	13 March	A	Dynamo Dresden	0 – 0	1	32	20	Report / Report link; Kick off / 15:30 CET; Attendance / 29,000; Referee / Karl-Josef Assenmacher; Dynamo Dresden / Bayern Munich; Wagenhaus (red card) 26' / Jorginho (yellow card)
22	20 March	H	1. FC Köln	3 – 0	1	34	23	Report / Report link; Kick off / 15:30 CET; Attendance / 38,000; Referee / Peter Mölm; Bayern Munich / 1. FC Köln; Ziege 13'; Wohlfarth 81'; Schupp 83' (yellow card) / Keuler (yellow card); Trulsen (yellow card); Steinmann (yellow card)
23	28 March	A	Hamburger SV	1 – 3	1	34	21	Report / Report link; Kick off / 18:00 CEST; Attendance / 60,500; Referee / Bernd Heynemann; Hamburger SV / Bayern Munich; von Heesen 23'; Furtok 70'; Eck 80' / Jorginho 86'; Kreuzer (yellow card); Wouters (yellow card); Helmer (yellow card)
24	2 April	A	SG Wattenscheid 09	0 – 2	1	34	19	Report / Report link; Kick off / 19:30 CEST; Attendance / 25,000; Referee / Hans Fux; SG Wattenscheid 09 / Bayern Munich; Ibrahim 72'; Leśniak 79' (yellow card) / Schupp (yellow card); Thon (yellow card)
25	10 April	H	Borussia Dortmund	2 – 0	1	36	21	Report / Report link; Kick off / 15:30 CEST; Attendance / 64,000; Referee / Dr. Markus Merk; Bayern Munich / Borussia Dortmund; Wouters 50'; Thon 81' (pen.) / Poschner (yellow card)
26	17 April	A	Borussia Mönchengladbach	2 – 2	1	37	21	Report / Report link; Kick off / 15:30 CEST; Attendance / 34,500; Referee / Hartmut Strampe; Borussia Mönchengladbach / Bayern Munich; Dahlin 46', 71'; Hochstätter (yellow card); Eichin (yellow card) / Ziege 12'; Scholl 25'; Schupp (yellow card); Labbadia (yellow card)
27	23 April	H	1. FC Saarbrücken	6 – 0	1	39	27	Report / Report link; Kick off / 20:00 CEST; Attendance / 24,000; Referee / Lothar Löwer; Bayern Munich / 1. FC Saarbrücken; Labbadia 16', 67'; Scholl 25', 29', 58'; Kreuzer 44' (yellow card); Mazinho (yellow card) / Eichmann (yellow card); Kostner (yellow card)
28	26 April	A	Werder Bremen	1 – 4	1	39	24	Report / Report link; Kick off / 15:30 CEST; Attendance / 40,800; Referee / Jürgen Aust; Werder Bremen / Bayern Munich; Rufer 45' (pen.), 52' (pen.); Herzog 68'; Hobsch 79'; Neubarth (yellow card) / Ziege 29'; Helmer (yellow card); Scholl (yellow card); Schupp (yellow card); Gospodarek (yellow card); Matthäus (yellow card)
29	30 April	H	VfB Stuttgart	5 – 3	1	41	26	Report / Report link; Kick off / 20:00 CEST; Attendance / 56,000; Referee / Hellmut Krug; Bayern Munich / VfB Stuttgart; Helmer 3'; Schupp 24'; Matthäus 52', 56' (yellow card); Wohlfarth 61' Thon (yellow card) / Eyjólfur 7' (yellow card); Gaudino 37'; Strunz 63' (yellow card); Buchwald (yellow card)
30	8 May	A	1. FC Nürnberg	0 – 0	1	42	26	Report / Report link; Kick off / 15:30 CEST; Attendance / 50,114; Referee / Karl-Heinz Gläser; 1. FC Nürnberg / Bayern Munich; / Matthäus (yellow card); Kreuzer (yellow card)
31	15 May	H	Bayer Leverkusen	4 – 1	1	44	29	Report / Report link; Kick off / 15:30 CEST; Attendance / 51,000; Referee / Edgar Steinborn; Bayern Munich / Bayer Leverkusen; Helmer 23'; Labbadia 40'; Schupp 65'; Scholl 83'; Wouters (yellow card) / Kirsten 47' von Ahlen (yellow card)
32	23 May	A	Karlsruher SC	2 – 4	1	44	27	Report / Report link; Kick off / 20:15 CEST; Attendance / 40,000; Referee / Manfred Harder; Karlsruher SC / Bayern Munich; Carl 24', 34'; Rolff 45'; Schütterle 49' (yellow card); Klinge (yellow card); Wittwer (yellow card) / Mazinho 65'; Ziege 90'; Scholl (yellow card)
33	29 May	H	VfL Bochum	3 – 1	2	46	29	Report / Report link; Kick off / 15:30 CEST; Attendance / 64,000; Referee / Alfons Berg; Bayern Munich / VfL Bochum; Scholl 29'; Ziege 32'; Matthäus 43'; Thon (yellow card); Kreuzer (yellow card) / Wosz 74'; Aden (yellow card); Kempe (yellow card)
34	5 June	A	Schalke 04	3 – 3	2	47	29	Report / Report link; Kick off / 15:30 CEST; Attendance / 70,000; Referee / Lutz Michael Fröhlich; Schalke 04 / Bayern Munich; Anderbrügge 5'; Borodyuk 35', 85'; Müller (yellow card); Güttler (yellow card); Gehrke (yellow card); Mademann (yellow card) / Scholl 25'; Matthäus 74'; Wouters 76'; Kreuzer (yellow card) 82' (red card); Labbadia (yellow card)

^{1}Bayern Munich goals come first.
Ground's country's flag and opponent's country's flag shown when from a different country of Bayern Munich.
Pos. = Position in league, Pts. = Points, GD = Goal difference, Ground: H = Home, A = Away, N = Neutral, HR = Home replacement, AR = Away replacement.

==== League standings ====
Pos	Team	Pld	W	D	L	GF	GA	GD	Pts	Qualification or relegation
1	Werder Bremen (C)	34	19	10	5	63	30	+33	48	Qualification to Champions League first round
2	Bayern Munich	34	18	11	5	74	45	+29	47	Qualification to UEFA Cup first round
3	Eintracht Frankfurt	34	15	12	7	56	39	+17	42	Qualification to UEFA Cup first round
4	Borussia Dortmund	34	18	5	11	61	43	+18	41	Qualification to UEFA Cup first round
5	Bayer Leverkusen	34	14	12	8	64	45	+19	40	Qualification to Cup Winners' Cup first round

Source: www.dfb.de
Rules for classification: 1) points; 2) goal difference; 3) number of goals scored.
(C) Champions

=== DFB Pokal ===
25 August 1st Round	Borussia Neunkirchen	0–6	Bayern Munich	Neunkirchen
			Thon 18' (pen.); Labbadia 24', 90'; Schupp 75'; Ziege 77', 81'	Stadium: Ellenfeldstadion; Attendance: 17,000; Referee: Michael Prengel

12 September 2nd Round	Borussia Dortmund	2–2 (a.e.t.) (5–4 p)	Bayern Munich	Dortmund
	Reinhardt 8'; Chapuisat 84'		Labbadia 16'; Mazinho 58'	Stadium: Westfalenstadion; Attendance: 37,400; Referee: Hans-Joachim Osmers
	Penalties
	Reuter (penalty scored); Poschner (penalty scored); Reinhardt (penalty scored); Chapuisat (penalty scored); Zorc (penalty scored)		Schwabl (penalty scored); Wouters (penalty scored); Kreuzer (penalty scored); Mazinho (penalty missed); Schupp (penalty scored)

== Team statistics ==
Competition	First match	Last match	Starting round	Final position	Record							
Competition	First match	Last match	Starting round	Final position	G	W	D	L	GF	GA	GD	Win %
Bundesliga	15 August 1992	5 June 1993	Matchday 1	2nd	34	18	11	5	74	45	+29	52.94
DFB-Pokal	25 August 1992	12 September 1992	First round	Second round	2	1	1	0	8	2	+6	50.00
Total					36	19	12	5	80	47	+33	52.78

== Players ==
=== Squad, appearances and goals ===
No.	Pos	Nat	Player	Total		Bundesliga		DFB-Pokal	
No.	Pos	Nat	Player	Apps	Goals	Apps	Goals	Apps	Goals
	GK	(Germany) GER	Raimond Aumann (captain)	34	0	32+0	0	2+0	0
	GK	(Germany) GER	Uwe Gospodarek	2	0	2+0	0	0+0	0
	DF	(Germany) GER	Roland Grahammer	3	0	0+2	0	1+0	0
	DF	(Germany) GER	Thomas Helmer	36	7	34+0	7	2+0	0
	DF	(Brazil) BRA	Jorginho	34	3	33+0	3	1+0	0
	DF	(Germany) GER	Oliver Kreuzer	32	5	30+0	5	2+0	0
	DF	(Germany) GER	Markus Münch	11	0	5+6	0	0+0	0
	DF	(Germany) GER	Alois Reinhardt	5	0	2+3	0	0+0	0
	MF	(Austria) AUT	Harald Cerny	13	1	6+7	1	0+0	0
	MF	(Germany) GER	Lothar Matthäus	28	8	28+0	8	0+0	0
	MF	(Germany) GER	Mehmet Scholl	33	7	21+10	7	2+0	0
	MF	(Germany) GER	Markus Schupp	34	6	31+1	5	2+0	1
	MF	(Germany) GER	Michael Sternkopf	12	0	1+11	0	0+0	0
	MF	(Germany) GER	Olaf Thon	34	6	32+0	5	2+0	1
	MF	(Netherlands) NED	Jan Wouters	35	4	33+0	4	2+0	0
	MF	(Germany) GER	Christian Ziege	30	11	27+1	9	2+0	2
	FW	(Germany) GER	Bruno Labbadia	34	14	32+0	11	2+0	3
	FW	(Germany) GER	Roland Wohlfarth	22	4	13+8	4	0+1	0
	FW	(Brazil) BRA	Mazinho	18	4	12+5	3	1+0	1
Players sold or loaned out after the start of the season:
	MF	(Germany) GER	Manfred Schwabl	5	0	0+3	0	0+2	0

=== Bookings ===
No.	Player	Bundesliga			DFB-Pokal			Total		
No.	Player	Booked	(yellow card) (red card)	Sent off (straight red)	Booked	(yellow card) (red card)	Sent off (straight red)	Booked	(yellow card) (red card)	Sent off (straight red)
	Oliver Kreuzer	11	1	0	0	0	0	11	1	0
	Lothar Matthäus	8	0	0	0	0	0	8	0	0
	Olaf Thon	7	0	0	0	1	0	7	1	0
	Markus Schupp	5	0	0	2	0	0	7	0	0
	Jan Wouters	6	0	0	1	0	0	7	0	0
	Mehmet Scholl	6	1	0	0	0	0	6	1	0
	Mazinho	4	0	0	1	0	0	5	0	0
	Thomas Helmer	3	0	0	0	0	0	3	0	0
	Jorginho	3	0	0	0	0	0	3	0	0
	Bruno Labbadia	2	0	0	0	0	0	2	0	0
	Uwe Gospodarek	1	0	0	0	0	0	1	0	0
	Roland Grahammer	1	0	0	0	0	0	1	0	0
	Manfred Schwabl	1	0	0	0	0	0	1	0	0
	Christian Ziege	1	0	0	0	0	0	1	0	0
	Roland Wohlfarth	0	1	0	0	0	0	0	1	0
Totals		59	3	0	4	1	0	63	4	0

== Transfers ==
=== In ===
No.	Pos.	Nat.	Name	Age	EU	Moving from	Type	Transfer window	Ends	Transfer fee	Source
	DF	(Germany)	Thomas Helmer	27	EU	Borussia Dortmund	Transfer	Summer		€3.75 Million	
	DF	(Brazil)	Jorginho	27	Non-EU	Bayer Leverkusen	Transfer	Summer		€2.8 Million	
	MF	(Germany)	Mehmet Scholl	21	EU	Karlsruher SC	Transfer	Summer		€2.5 Million	
	MF	(Germany)	Lothar Matthäus	31	EU	Internazionale (Italy)	Transfer	Summer		€2 Million	
	MF	(Germany)	Markus Schupp	26	EU	SG Wattenscheid 09	Transfer	Summer		Free	
	DF	(Germany)	Dieter Frey	19	EU	FC Augsburg	Transfer	Summer		Undisclosed	
	MF	(Austria)	Harald Cerny	18	Non-EU	Youth system	Promotion	Summer		N/A	

=== Out ===
No.	Pos.	Nat.	Name	Age	EU	Moving to	Type	Transfer window	Transfer fee	Source
	MF	(Germany)	Manfred Schwabl	26	EU	1. FC Nürnberg	Loan	Winter		
	FW	(Denmark)	Brian Laudrup	23	EU	Fiorentina (Italy)	Transfer	Summer	€5 Million	
	MF	(Germany)	Stefan Effenberg	23	EU	Fiorentina (Italy)	Transfer	Summer	€3.75 Million	
	MF	(Germany)	Manfred Bender	26	EU	Karlsruher SC	Transfer	Summer	€700,000	
	DF	(Germany)	Markus Babbel	19	EU	Hamburger SV	Loan	Summer		
	MF	(Germany)	Thomas Strunz	24	EU	VfB Stuttgart	Transfer	Summer	Free	
	DF	(Germany)	Kurt Kremm	28	EU		Transfer			
	GK	(Germany)	Gerald Hillringhaus	30	EU	Schalke 04	Transfer	Summer	Undisclosed	
	GK	(Germany)	Harald Schumacher	38	EU		End of career			
