= 1991–92 FC Bayern Munich season =

92nd season in existence of Bayern Munich

Bayern Munich
1991–92 season
- Manager: Jupp Heynckes (to 8 October); Søren Lerby (from 9 October to 11 March); Erich Ribbeck (from 12 March)
- Stadium: Olympiastadion
- Bundesliga: 10th
- UEFA Cup: Second round
- DFB-Pokal: Second round
- Top goalscorer: League: Roland Wohlfarth (17); All: Roland Wohlfarth (17)
Home colours	Away colours

The 1991–92 FC Bayern Munich season was the 92nd season in the club's history and 27th season since promotion from Regionalliga Süd in 1965. Bayern finished in tenth place in the Bundesliga having sixteen fewer points than champion VfB Stuttgart. This finish was the lowest since Bayern finished twelfth in 1977–78. The Bundesliga season consisted of 38 games instead of the usual 34 due to German reunification. For a second consecutive season, the DFB-Pokal campaign was ended after one match. The UEFA Cup campaign lasted two rounds when Bayern was eliminated by Boldklubben 1903. Three managers were in charge of the club this season. Jupp Heynckes was manager until 8 October), Søren Lerby led the team from 9 October to 11 March, and Erich Ribbeck finished the season.

== Results ==
=== Friendlies ===
==== Fuji-Cup ====
22 July Semifinals	Borussia Dortmund	2–0	Bayern Munich	Bayreuth

25 July Third Place	Bayern Munich	2–2 (5–3 p)	1. FC Kaiserslautern	Bayreuth

=== Bundesliga ===
==== League results ====
Match	Date	Ground	Opponent	Score^{1}	Pos.	Pts.	GD	Report
1	3 August	A	Werder Bremen	1 – 1	11	1	0	Report / Report link; Kick off / 15:30 CEST; Attendance / 33,00; Referee / Hans-Jürgen Weber; Werder Bremen / Bayern Munich; Rufer 77'; Schaaf (yellow card) / Laudrup 25'; Wohlfarth (yellow card); Pflügler (yellow card)
2	10 August	H	Hansa Rostock	1 – 2	14	1	-1	Report / Report link; Kick off / 15:30 CEST; Attendance / 43,000; Referee / Lothar Löwer; Bayern Munich / Hansa Rostock; Wohlfarth 3'; Strunz (yellow card) / Sedlacek 63'; Wahl 68'; Böger (yellow card)
3	14 August	A	Fortuna Düsseldorf	1 – 0	9	3	0	Report / Report link; Kick off / 20:00 CEST; Attendance / 33,000; Referee / Hans-Joachim Osmers; Fortuna Düsseldorf / Bayern Munich; Hutwelker (yellow card) / Mazinho 89'; Grahammer (yellow card); Strunz (yellow card)
4	20 August	H	Schalke 04	3 – 2	7	5	1	Report / Report link; Kick off / 20:00 CEST; Attendance / 43,000; Referee / Michael Malbranc; Bayern Munich / Schalke 04; Bender 30'; Effenberg 38' (pen.) (yellow card) 81' (red card); Labbadia 54'; Schwabl (yellow card); Kreuzer (yellow card) / Sendscheid 52'; Güttler 62' (pen.) (yellow card); Lugninger (yellow card)
5	23 August	A	Dynamo Dresden	2 – 0	4	7	3	Report / Report link; Kick off / 20:00 CEST; Attendance / 30,000; Referee / Manfred Führer; Dynamo Dresden / Bayern Munich; Zander (yellow card); Lieberam (yellow card) / Labbadia 45'; Wohlfarth 62'; Bender (yellow card); Grahammer (yellow card); Ziege (yellow card)
6	28 August	H	VfL Bochum	0 – 2	6	7	1	Report / Report link; Kick off / 20:00 CEST; Attendance / 20,000; Referee / Günther Habermann; Bayern Munich / VfL Bochum; Kreuzer (red card) 17' / Bonan 59'; Benatelli 81'; Eitzert (yellow card); Helmig (yellow card)
7	31 August	A	1. FC Köln	1 – 1	8	8	1	Report / Report link; Kick off / 15:30 CEST; Attendance / 43,000; Referee / Hans-Peter Dellwing; 1. FC Köln / Bayern Munich; Banach 64'; Flick (yellow card); Ordenewitz (yellow card); Illgner (yellow card) / Effenberg 14'; Labbadia (yellow card)
8	7 September	H	1. FC Kaiserslautern	1 – 0	5	10	2	Report / Report link; Kick off / 15:30 CEST; Attendance / 47,000; Referee / Hellmut Krug; Bayern Munich / 1. FC Kaiserslautern; Effenberg 16' (pen.) (yellow card); Schwabl (yellow card); Bernardo (yellow card); Grahammer (yellow card) / Funkel (red card) 43'; Schäfer (yellow card); Roos (yellow card)
9	14 September	A	Hamburger SV	0 – 1	7	10	1	Report / Report link; Kick off / 15:30 CEST; Attendance / 52,400; Referee / Alfons Berg; Hamburger SV / Bayern Munich; Eck 45' / Ziege (yellow card)
10	21 September	H	Eintracht Frankfurt	3 – 3	8	11	1	Report / Report link; Kick off / 15:30 CEST; Attendance / 64,000; Referee / Gerhard Theobald; Bayern Munich / Eintracht Frankfurt; Labbadia 35', 55' (yellow card); Bender 47'; Grahammer (yellow card) / Andersen 36', 82'; Yeboah 54'; Weber (yellow card); Falkenmayer (yellow card)
11	27 September	A	1. FC Nürnberg	1 – 1	8	12	1	Report / Report link; Kick off / 20:00 CEST; Attendance / 52,500; Referee / Manfred Neuner; 1. FC Nürnberg / Bayern Munich; Wück 80'; Wolf (yellow card) / Wohlfarth 72'; Kreuzer (yellow card)
12	5 October	H	Stuttgarter Kickers	1 – 4	12	12	-2	Report / Report link; Kick off / 15:30 CET; Attendance / 35,000; Referee / Jürgen Aust; Bayern Munich / Stuttgarter Kickers; Wohlfarth 73'; Ziege (yellow card); Pflügler (yellow card) / Kula 8'; Marin 24'; Keim 64'; Moutas 89'
13	12 October	H	Borussia Dortmund	0 – 3	13	12	-5	Report / Report link; Kick off / 15:30 CET; Attendance / 27,000; Referee / Bernd Heynemann; Bayern Munich / Borussia Dortmund; Berthold (yellow card) / Rummenigge 25' (yellow card); Povlsen 47'; Münch 86' (o.g.); Karl (yellow card); Franck (yellow card); Kutowski (yellow card)
14	19 October	A	VfB Stuttgart	2 – 3	14	12	-6	Report / Report link; Kick off / 15:30 CET; Attendance / 62,300; Referee / Michael Prengel; VfB Stuttgart / Bayern Munich; Gaudino 4'; Walter 8'; Dubajic 72'; Kramny (yellow card); Frontzeck (yellow card) / Berthold 23' (yellow card); Effenberg 78' (pen.) (yellow card); Labbadia (yellow card); Thon (yellow card); Münch (yellow card)
15	26 October	H	Borussia Mönchengladbach	3 – 0	13	14	-3	Report / Report link; Kick off / 15:30 CET; Attendance / 36,000; Referee / Dr. Markus Merk; Bayern Munich / Borussia Mönchengladbach; Mazinho 34', 80'; Effenberg 56'; Kastenmaier (yellow card) / Eichin (yellow card)
16	1 November	A	SG Wattenscheid 09	0 – 0	14	15	-3	Report / Report link; Kick off / 20:00 CET; Attendance / 40,000; Referee / Hartmut Strampe; SG Wattenscheid 09 / Bayern Munich; Sané (yellow card) / Labbadia (yellow card); Schwabl (yellow card)
17	9 November	H	Bayer Leverkusen	2 – 2	13	16	-3	Report / Report link; Kick off / 15:30 CET; Attendance / 16,000; Referee / Rainer Boos; Bayern Munich / Bayer Leverkusen; Labbadia 32', 38'; Kreuzer (yellow card); Babbel (yellow card) / Happe 62' (yellow card); Kree 70'; Herrlich (yellow card); Nehl (yellow card)
18	15 November	A	MSV Duisburg	1 – 1	13	17	-3	Report / Report link; Kick off / 19:30 CET; Attendance / 30,100; Referee / Hans-Jürgen Kasper; MSV Duisburg / Bayern Munich; Nijhuis 30' / Wohlfarth 84'; Thon (yellow card); Effenberg (yellow card)
19	23 November	H	Karlsruher SC	1 – 0	10	19	-2	Report / Report link; Kick off / 15:30 CET; Attendance / 20,000; Referee / Eugen Strigel; Bayern Munich / Karlsruher SC; Effenberg 8'; Reinhardt (yellow card); Kreuzer (yellow card) / Scholl (yellow card); Carl (yellow card)
20	30 November	H	Werder Bremen	3 – 4	12	19	-3	Report / Report link; Kick off / 15:30 CET; Attendance / 18,000; Referee / Edgar Steinborn; Bayern Munich / Werder Bremen; Mazinho 53', 89'; Reck 67' (o.g.); Effenberg (yellow card); Kreuzer (yellow card) / Rufer 7'; Bode 30'; Kohn 52' (yellow card); Borowka 85'
21	7 December	A	Hansa Rostock	1 – 2	14	19	-4	Report / Report link; Kick off / 15:30 CET; Attendance / 20,000; Referee / Günther Habermann; Hansa Rostock / Bayern Munich; Spies 72', 77' / Reinhardt 63'; Wouters (yellow card)
22	14 December	H	Fortuna Düsseldorf	3 – 1	11	21	-2	Report / Report link; Kick off / 15:30 CET; Attendance / 11,000; Referee / Manfred Harder; Bayern Munich / Fortuna Düsseldorf; Mazinho 74'; Wouters 75'; Wohlfarth 84' (pen.) / Spanring 32'
23	8 February	A	Schalke 04	1 – 1	11	22	-2	Report / Report link; Kick off / 15:30 CET; Attendance / 70,000; Referee / Hans-Peter Dellwing; Schalke 04 / Bayern Munich; Mihajlović 87' / Kreuzer (red card) 39'; Wohlfarth 53' (yellow card); Mazinho (yellow card); Strunz (yellow card); Aumann (yellow card)
24	15 February	H	Dynamo Dresden	1 – 2	11	22	-3	Report / Report link; Kick off / 15:30 CET; Attendance / 16,000; Referee / Wolf-Günter Wiesel; Bayern Munich / Dynamo Dresden; Wohlfarth 62'; Berthold (yellow card) / Scholz 40'; Zander 83'
25	20 February	A	VfL Bochum	5 – 0	10	24	2	Report / Report link; Kick off / 19:15 CET; Attendance / 17,500; Referee / Gerhard Theobald; VfL Bochum / Bayern Munich; / Wohlfarth 8', 33', 50'; Ziege 18', 55'; Grahammer (yellow card); Kreuzer (yellow card)
26	29 February	H	1. FC Köln	0 – 0	10	25	2	Report / Report link; Kick off / 15:30 CET; Attendance / 32,000; Referee / Alfons Berg; Bayern Munich / 1. FC Köln; Aumann (red card) 68'; Kreuzer (yellow card)
27	7 March	A	1. FC Kaiserslautern	0 – 4	11	25	-2	Report / Report link; Kick off / 15:30 CET; Attendance / 38,500; Referee / Karl-Heinz Gläser; 1. FC Kaiserslautern / Bayern Munich; Witeczek 10'; Hotić 68'; Lelle 70'; Kadlec 83'; Dooley (yellow card) / Grahammer (red card) 40'; Effenberg (yellow card); Thon (yellow card); Wouters (yellow card)
28	14 March	H	Hamburger SV	2 – 0	9	27	0	Report / Report link; Kick off / 15:30 CET; Attendance / 20,000; Referee / Werner Föckler; Bayern Munich / Hamburger SV; Wohlfarth 88'; Thon 90'; Sternkopf (yellow card); Wouters (yellow card); Kreuzer (yellow card); Strunz (yellow card) / Eck (yellow card)
29	21 March	A	Eintracht Frankfurt	2 – 3	11	27	-1	Report / Report link; Kick off / 15:30 CET; Attendance / 60,500; Referee / Hellmut Krug; Eintracht Frankfurt / Bayern Munich; Yeboah 25'; Möller 49'; Roth 64'; Weber (yellow card); Falkenmayer (yellow card) / Labbadia 37'; Thon 69'; Berthold (yellow card) 63' (red card); Effenberg (yellow card)
30	28 March	H	1. FC Nürnberg	1 – 3	13	27	-3	Report / Report link; Kick off / 15:30 CET; Attendance / 55,000; Referee / Karl-Josef Assenmacher; Bayern Munich / 1. FC Nürnberg; Mazinho 2'; Labbadia (yellow card); Wouters (yellow card) / Wück 18'; Zárate 42' (pen.), 88'; Wagner (yellow card); Golke (yellow card)
31	4 April	A	Stuttgarter Kickers	4 – 2	11	29	-1	Report / Report link; Kick off / 15:30 CET; Attendance / 24,500; Referee / Hans-Joachim Osmers; Stuttgarter Kickers / Bayern Munich; Moutas 89'; Kula 53'; Novodomsky (yellow card) / Wohlfarth 21'; Mazinho 38'; Labbadia 55'; Sternkopf 80'; Pflügler (yellow card); Thon (yellow card)
32	10 April	A	Borussia Dortmund	0 – 3	12	29	-4	Report / Report link; Kick off / 20:00 CET; Attendance / 52,616; Referee / Edgar Steinborn; Borussia Dortmund / Bayern Munich; Rummenigge 20'; Franck 59'; Chapuisat 82' / Effenberg (yellow card); Wohlfarth (yellow card); Sternkopf (yellow card); Berthold (yellow card)
33	18 April	H	VfB Stuttgart	1 – 0	10	31	-3	Report / Report link; Kick off / 15:30 CET; Attendance / 65,000; Referee / Manfred Führer; Bayern Munich / VfB Stuttgart; Effenberg 44'; Thon (yellow card); Strunz (yellow card) / Schäfer (red card) 85'; Eyjólfur (yellow card); Sammer (yellow card); Frontzeck (yellow card); Immel (yellow card)
34	25 April	A	Borussia Mönchengladbach	1 – 1	10	32	-3	Report / Report link; Kick off / 15:30 CET; Attendance / 34,000; Referee / Wolfgang Mierswa; Borussia Mönchengladbach / Bayern Munich; Criens 60' (pen.); Schulz (yellow card); Fach (yellow card); Huschbeck (yellow card); Kastenmaier (yellow card) / Laudrup 56' (yellow card); Effenberg (yellow card); Kreuzer (yellow card); Münch (yellow card); Schwabl (yellow card)
35	1 May	H	SG Wattenscheid 09	5 – 2	10	34	0	Report / Report link; Kick off / 15:30 CET; Attendance / 27,000; Referee / Manfred Neuner; Bayern Munich / SG Wattenscheid 09; Wohlfarth 8'; Effenberg 29', 49' (pen.) (yellow card); Labbadia 36', 51' / Fink 17' (yellow card); Bach 89'; Neuhaus (yellow card); Eilenberger (yellow card)
36	5 May	A	Bayer Leverkusen	1 – 2	10	34	-1	Report / Report link; Kick off / 20:00 CET; Attendance / 19,000; Referee / Wieland Ziller; Bayer Leverkusen / Bayern Munich; von Ahlen 7'; Feinbier 59' / Wohlfarth 79'; Sternkopf (yellow card); Labbadia (yellow card)
37	9 May	H	MSV Duisburg	4 – 2	10	36	1	Report / Report link; Kick off / 15:30 CET; Attendance / 23,000; Referee / Lutz Michael Fröhlich; Bayern Munich / MSV Duisburg; Kreuzer 19'; Wohlfarth 50', 75'; Effenberg 65' (yellow card) / Struckmann 16', 29'; Woelk (yellow card) 86' (red card); Lienen (yellow card)
38	16 May	A	Karlsruher SC	0 – 3	10	36	-2	Report / Report link; Kick off / 15:30 CET; Attendance / 24,000; Referee / Michael Prengel; Karlsruher SC / Bayern Munich; Shmarov 57'; Reich 69'; Krieg 75'; Rolff (yellow card) / Thon (yellow card)

^{1}Bayern Munich goals come first.
Ground's country's flag and opponent's country's flag shown when from a different country of Bayern Munich.
Pos. = Position in league, Pts. = Points, GD = Goal difference, Ground: H = Home, A = Away, N = Neutral, HR = Home replacement, AR = Away replacement.

==== League table ====
Pos	Team	Pld	W	D	L	GF	GA	GD	Pts	Qualification or relegation
8	Karlsruher SC	38	16	9	13	48	50	−2	41	
9	Werder Bremen	38	11	16	11	44	45	−1	38	Qualification to Cup Winners' Cup first round
10	Bayern Munich	38	13	10	15	59	61	−2	36	
11	Schalke 04	38	11	12	15	45	45	0	34	
12	Hamburger SV	38	9	16	13	32	43	−11	34	

Source: www.dfb.de
Rules for classification: 1) points; 2) goal difference; 3) number of goals scored.
The league contracted back to 18 teams for the 1992–93 season.

=== DFB Pokal ===
17 August 2nd Round	Bayern Munich	2–4 (a.e.t.)	FC 08 Homburg	Munich
	Mazinho 27', 78'		Cardoso 64'; Baranowski 77'; Kimmel 95'; Gries 99'	Stadium: Olympiastadion; Attendance: 9,000; Referee: Karl-Heinz Gläser

=== UEFA Cup ===
==== 1st round ====
18 September 1st leg	Cork City F.C. (Republic of Ireland)	1–1	(Germany) Bayern Munich	Cork, Ireland
	Barry 26'		Effenberg 43'	Stadium: Musgrave Park; Attendance: 4,000; Referee: Rémi Harrel (France)

2 October 2nd leg	Bayern Munich (Germany)	2–0 (3–1 agg.)	(Republic of Ireland) Cork City F.C.	Munich, Germany
	Labbadia 71'; Ziege 89' (pen.)			Stadium: Olympiastadion; Attendance: 13,500; Referee: Stavros Zakestidis (Greece)

==== 2nd round ====
23 October 1st leg	Boldklubben 1903 (Denmark)	6–2	(Germany) Bayern Munich	Copenhagen, Denmark
20:00 CET	Manniche 37', 64'; Nielsen 57' (pen.); Wegner 61'; Klaus 77'; Uldbjerg 88'		Mazinho 32'; Münch 90'	Stadium: Gentofte Stadion; Attendance: 14,000; Referee: James McCluskey (Scotland)

6 November 2nd leg	Bayern Munich (Germany)	1–0 (3–6 agg.)	(Denmark) Boldklubben 1903	Munich, Germany
	Mazinho 89' (pen.)			Stadium: Olympiastadion; Attendance: 21,000; Referee: Joaquín Urío Velázquez (Spain)

== Team statistics ==
Competition	First match	Last match	Starting round	Final position	Record							
Competition	First match	Last match	Starting round	Final position	G	W	D	L	GF	GA	GD	Win %
Bundesliga	3 August 1991	16 May 1992	Matchday 1	10th	38	13	10	15	59	62	−3	34.21
DFB-Pokal	17 August 1991	17 August 1991	Second round	Second round	1	0	0	1	2	4	−2	0.00
UEFA Cup	18 September 1991	5 November 1991	First round	Second round	4	2	1	1	6	7	−1	50.00
Total					43	15	11	17	67	73	−6	34.88

== Players ==
=== Squad, appearances and goals ===
No.	Pos	Nat	Player	Total		Bundesliga		DFB-Pokal		UEFA Cup	
No.	Pos	Nat	Player	Apps	Goals	Apps	Goals	Apps	Goals	Apps	Goals
	GK	(Germany) GER	Gerald Hillringhaus	22	0	16+1	0	1+0	0	4+0	0
	GK	(Germany) GER	Raimond Aumann (captain)	13	0	13+0	0	0+0	0	0+0	0
	GK	(Germany) GER	Harald Schumacher	8	0	8+0	0	0+0	0	0+0	0
	GK	(Germany) GER	Uwe Gospodarek	1	0	1+0	0	0+0	0	0+0	0
	DF	(Germany) GER	Oliver Kreuzer	41	1	35+1	1	1+0	0	3+1	0
	DF	(Germany) GER	Thomas Berthold	35	1	30+0	1	1+0	0	4+0	0
	DF	(Germany) GER	Roland Grahammer	24	0	16+4	0	1+0	0	3+0	0
	DF	(Germany) GER	Hans Pflügler	17	0	11+3	0	1+0	0	1+1	0
	DF	(Germany) GER	Markus Münch	16	1	13+2	0	0+0	0	1+0	1
	DF	(Germany) GER	Markus Babbel	14	0	8+4	0	1+0	0	1+0	0
	DF	(Germany) GER	Alois Reinhardt	7	1	5+2	1	0+0	0	0+0	0
	DF	(Germany) GER	Kurt Kremm	2	0	0+2	0	0+0	0	0+0	0
	DF	(Germany) GER	Max Eberl	1	0	1+0	0	0+0	0	0+0	0
	MF	(Germany) GER	Stefan Effenberg	38	11	33+0	10	1+0	0	4+0	1
	MF	(Germany) GER	Manfred Schwabl	32	0	26+3	0	0+0	0	2+1	0
	MF	(Germany) GER	Christian Ziege	29	3	25+1	2	0+0	0	3+0	1
	MF	(Germany) GER	Manfred Bender	29	2	20+4	2	1+0	0	4+0	0
	MF	(Germany) GER	Michael Sternkopf	29	1	21+5	1	0+0	0	3+0	0
	MF	(Germany) GER	Olaf Thon	26	2	23+1	2	0+0	0	2+0	0
	MF	(Netherlands) NED	Jan Wouters	17	1	17+0	1	0+0	0	0+0	0
	MF	(Germany) GER	Thomas Strunz	15	0	12+1	0	1+0	0	1+0	0
	FW	(Germany) GER	Bruno Labbadia	35	11	23+7	10	1+0	0	2+2	1
	FW	(Germany) GER	Roland Wohlfarth	33	17	23+6	17	0+1	0	1+2	0
	FW	(Brazil) BRA	Mazinho	33	12	20+8	8	1+0	2	4+0	2
	FW	(Denmark) DEN	Brian Laudrup	21	2	16+4	2	0+1	0	0+0	0
	FW	(Scotland) SCO	Alan McInally	2	0	0+2	0	0+0	0	0+0	0
	FW	(Germany) GER	Thorsten Ott	1	0	0+1	0	0+0	0	0+0	0
Players sold or loaned out after the start of the season:
	MF	(Brazil) BRA	Bernardo	5	0	2+2	0	0+0	0	1+0	0

=== Bookings ===
No.	Player	Bundesliga			DFB-Pokal			UEFA Cup			Total		
No.	Player	Booked	(yellow card) (red card)	Sent off (straight red)	Booked	(yellow card) (red card)	Sent off (straight red)	Booked	(yellow card) (red card)	Sent off (straight red)	Booked	(yellow card) (red card)	Sent off (straight red)
	Stefan Effenberg	10	1	0	1	0	0	1	0	0	12	0	0
	Oliver Kreuzer	10	0	2	0	0	0	0	0	0	10	0	2
	Roland Grahammer	5	0	1	0	0	0	1	0	0	6	0	1
	Bruno Labbadia	6	0	0	0	0	0	0	0	0	6	0	0
	Olaf Thon	6	0	0	0	0	0	0	0	0	6	0	0
	Thomas Berthold	4	1	0	0	0	0	0	0	0	4	1	0
	Manfred Schwabl	4	0	0	0	0	0	0	0	0	4	0	0
	Michael Sternkopf	3	0	0	0	0	0	1	0	0	4	0	0
	Thomas Strunz	4	0	0	0	0	0	0	0	0	4	0	0
	Jan Wouters	4	0	0	0	0	0	0	0	0	4	0	0
	Hans Pflügler	3	0	0	0	0	0	0	0	0	3	0	0
	Roland Wohlfarth	3	0	0	0	0	0	0	0	0	3	0	0
	Christian Ziege	3	0	0	0	0	0	0	0	0	3	0	0
	Markus Münch	2	0	0	0	0	0	0	0	0	2	0	0
	Raimond Aumann	1	0	1	0	0	0	0	0	0	1	0	1
	Markus Babbel	1	0	0	0	0	0	0	0	0	1	0	0
	Manfred Bender	1	0	0	0	0	0	0	0	0	1	0	0
	Bernardo	1	0	0	0	0	0	0	0	0	1	0	0
	Brian Laudrup	1	0	0	0	0	0	0	0	0	1	0	0
	Mazinho	1	0	0	0	0	0	0	0	0	1	0	0
	Alois Reinhardt	1	0	0	0	0	0	0	0	0	1	0	0
Totals		74	2	4	1	0	0	3	0	0	78	2	4

== Transfers ==
=== In ===
No.	Pos.	Nat.	Name	Age	EU	Moving from	Type	Transfer window	Ends	Transfer fee	Source
	MF	(Netherlands)	Jan Wouters	31	EU	Ajax (Netherlands)	Transfer	Winter		€1 Million	
	DF	(Germany)	Alois Reinhardt	29	EU	Bayer Leverkusen	Transfer	Summer		Undisclosed	
	DF	(Germany)	Oliver Kreuzer	25	EU	Karlsruher SC	Transfer	Summer		€2.35 Million	
	FW	(Brazil)	Mazinho	25	Non-EU	Bragantino (Brazil)	Transfer	Summer		€1.8 Million	
	DF	(Germany)	Thomas Berthold	26	EU	Roma (Italy)	Transfer	Summer		€1.4 Million	
	MF	(Brazil)	Bernardo	26	Non-EU	São Paulo (Brazil)	Transfer	Summer		€900,000	
	FW	(Germany)	Bruno Labbadia	25	EU	1. FC Kaiserslautern	Transfer	Summer		€800,000	
	GK	(Germany)	Harald Schumacher	37	EU	Fenerbahçe (Turkey)	Transfer	Summer		Free	
	DF	(Germany)	Kurt Kremm	27	EU		Transfer				
	GK	(Germany)	Uwe Gospodarek	18	EU	Youth system	Promotion	Summer		N/A	
	DF	(Germany)	Markus Babbel	17	EU	Youth system	Promotion	Summer		N/A	
	DF	(Germany)	Max Eberl	17	EU	Youth system	Promotion	Summer		N/A	

=== Out ===
No.	Pos.	Nat.	Name	Age	EU	Moving to	Type	Transfer window	Transfer fee	Source
	MF	(Brazil)	Bernardo	25	Non-EU	Internacional (SM) (Brazil)	Transfer	Winter	Undisclosed	
	DF	(Germany)	Jürgen Kohler	26	EU	Juventus (Italy)	Transfer	Summer	€7.5 Million	
	DF	(Germany)	Stefan Reuter	24	EU	Juventus (Italy)	Transfer	Summer	€2.9 Million	
	DF	(Germany)	Rainer Aigner	23	EU	Fortuna Düsseldorf	Transfer	Summer	€100,000	
	MF	(Denmark)	Allan Nielsen	20	EU	Sion (Switzerland)	Transfer	Summer	€75,000	
	DF	(Germany)	Klaus Augenthaler	33	EU		End of career			
