= 1993–94 FC Bayern Munich season =

94th season in existence of Bayern Munich

FC Bayern Munich
1993–94 season
- Manager: Erich Ribbeck (to 27 December); Franz Beckenbauer
- Bundesliga: 1st
- UEFA Cup: 2nd Round
- DFB-Pokal: Round of 16
- Top goalscorer: League: Mehmet Scholl (11); Adolfo Valencia; All: Mehmet Scholl (13); Adolfo Valencia
Home colours	Away colours

The 1993–94 FC Bayern Munich season was the 94th season in the club's history. Bayern Munich won its 12th Bundesliga title.

== Players ==
=== Squad, appearances and goals ===
No.	Pos	Nat	Player	Total		Bundesliga		UEFA Cup		DFB-Pokal	
No.	Pos	Nat	Player	Apps	Goals	Apps	Goals	Apps	Goals	Apps	Goals
1	GK	(Germany) GER	Raimond Aumann (captain)	40	0	32	0	4	0	4	0
12	GK	(Germany) GER	Uwe Gospodarek	2	0	2	0	0	0	0	0
4	DF	(Germany) GER	Oliver Kreuzer	39	2	31	0	4	0	4	2
17	DF	(Germany) GER	Christian Ziege	38	7	30	3	4	3	4	1
5	DF	(Germany) GER	Thomas Helmer	33	2	28	2	3	0	2	0
2	DF	(Brazil) BRA	Jorginho	29	2	24	2	3	0	2	0
17	DF	(Germany) GER	Olaf Thon	17	1	15	1	0	0	2	0
22	DF	(Germany) GER	Dieter Frey	12	1	12	1	0	0	0	0
3	DF	(Germany) GER	Markus Münch	12	0	10	0	1	0	1	0
19	DF	(Germany) GER	Alois Reinhardt	1	0	0	0	0	0	1	0
6	MF	(Germany) GER	Christian Nerlinger	40	12	32	9	4	2	4	1
10	MF	(Germany) GER	Lothar Matthäus	40	10	33	8	4	1	3	1
18	MF	(Germany) GER	Markus Schupp	39	4	32	4	3	0	4	0
11	MF	(Germany) GER	Marcel Witeczek	34	3	27	3	4	0	3	0
7	MF	(Germany) GER	Mehmet Scholl	33	13	27	11	4	1	2	1
14	MF	(Germany) GER	Michael Sternkopf	29	2	21	2	4	0	4	0
8	MF	(Netherlands) NED	Jan Wouters	24	2	16	1	4	0	4	1
16	MF	(Germany) GER	Dietmar Hamann	5	1	5	1	0	0	0	0
13	MF	(Austria) AUT	Harald Cerny	4	0	3	0	1	0	0	0
15	FW	(Colombia) COL	Adolfo Valencia	31	13	25	11	3	1	3	1
9	FW	(Germany) GER	Bruno Labbadia	23	10	20	7	1	0	2	3
21	FW	(Germany) GER	Alexander Zickler	10	1	7	1	1	0	2	0
20	FW	(Brazil) BRA	Mazinho Oliveira	1	0	1	0	0	0	0	0
23	FW	(Germany) GER	Oliver Stegmayer	1	0	0	0	0	0	1	0

=== Goals ===
Pos.	Player	BL	UC	Cup	Overall
1	(Germany) Mehmet Scholl	11	1	1	13
1	(Colombia) Adolfo Valencia	11	1	1	13
3	(Germany) Christian Nerlinger	9	2	1	12
4	(Germany) Lothar Matthäus	8	1	1	10
4	(Germany) Bruno Labbadia	7	0	3	10

=== Bookings ===
N	Pos.	Nat.	Name	Yellow card	Second yellow card	Red card	Notes
	DF	(Germany)	Oliver Kreuzer	12			
	DF	(Brazil)	Jorginho	7	1		
	DF	(Germany)	Dieter Frey	5			
	DF	(Germany)	Olaf Thon	4			
	DF	(Germany)	Christian Ziege	4			
	DF	(Germany)	Thomas Helmer	3	1		
	DF	(Germany)	Markus Münch	1			
	MF	(Germany)	Markus Schupp	10			
	MF	(Germany)	Lothar Matthäus	9			
	MF	(Germany)	Christian Nerlinger	6			
	MF	(Germany)	Mehmet Scholl	5			
	MF	(Netherlands)	Jan Wouters	4	1		
	MF	(Germany)	Michael Sternkopf	1	1		
	MF	(Germany)	Marcel Witeczek	1			
	FW	(Colombia)	Adolfo Valencia	3			
	FW	(Germany)	Bruno Labbadia	1			

Source: Kicker
Only competitive matches
(yellow card) = Number of bookings; (second yellow card) = Number of sending offs after a second yellow card; (red card) = Number of sending offs by a direct red card.

== Transfers ==
=== In ===
First Team

No.	Pos.	Nat.	Name	Age	EU	Moving from	Type	Transfer window	Ends	Transfer fee	Source
	DF	(West Germany)	Marco Grimm	21	EU	VfB Gaggenau	Transfer	Summer		Free	
	DF	(Ghana)	Samuel Kuffour	16	Non-EU	Torino (Italy)	Transfer	Summer		€250,000	
	MF	(West Germany) (Poland)	Marcel Witeczek	24	EU	1. FC Kaiserslautern	Transfer	Summer		€2,500,000	
	FW	(Colombia)	Adolfo Valencia	25	Non-EU	Santa Fe (Colombia)	Transfer	Summer		Undisclosed	
	FW	(Germany) (East Germany)	Alexander Zickler	19	EU	Dynamo Dresden	Transfer	Summer		€1,150,000	

Total spending: ▼€3.9m

=== Out ===
First Team

No.	Pos.	Nat.	Name	Age	EU	Moving to	Type	Transfer window	Transfer fee	Source
	DF	(Germany)	Thomas Berthold	28	EU	VfB Stuttgart	Transfer	Summer	€325,000	
	DF	(West Germany)	Alois Reinhardt	31	EU		End of career	Summer	N/A	
	DF	(Germany)	Max Eberl	19	EU	VfL Bochum	Transfer	Winter	€250,000	
	MF	(West Germany)	Manfred Schwabl	27	EU	1. FC Nürnberg	Transfer	Summer	€1,000,000	
	MF	(Austria)	Harald Cerny	19	EU	Admira Wacker Mödling (Austria)	Transfer	Winter	Undisclosed	
	MF	(Netherlands)	Jan Wouters	32	EU	PSV (Netherlands)	Transfer	Winter	Undisclosed	
	MF	(Netherlands Antilles) (Netherlands)	Raymond Victoria	20	EU	De Graafschap (Netherlands)	Transfer	Summer	Undisclosed	
	FW	(Scotland)	Alan McInally	30	EU	Kilmarnock (Scotland)	Transfer	Summer	Free	
	FW	(West Germany)	Roland Wohlfarth	30	EU	Saint-Étienne (France)	Transfer	Summer	€1,250,000	
	FW	(Brazil)	Mazinho Oliveira	27	Non-EU	Internacional (Brazil)	Loan	Winter	Undisclosed	

Total income: ▲€2.825m

=== Totals ===
Period	Spending	Income	Loss/Gain
Summer	▼€3.9m	▲€2.45m	▼€1.45m
Winter	▼€0	▲€250k	▲€250k
Totals	▼€3.9m	▲€2.7m	▼€1.2m

== Results ==
=== Friendlies ===
==== Fuji-Cup ====
19 July Semifinals	Bayern Munich	2–1	SV Werder Bremen	Marburg
	Wohlfarth 16', 24'		Neubarth 74'

21 July Final	Borussia Dortmund	3–2	Bayern Munich	Koblenz
	Riedle 11'; Freund 33'; Karl 84'		Scholl 6'; Zickler 27'

=== Bundesliga ===
7 August 1993 1	Bayern Munich	3–1	Freiburg	Munich
15:30 CEST	Schupp 8'; Valencia 14', 24'	Report	Freund 37'	Stadium: Olympiastadion; Attendance: 58,000; Referee: Karl-Josef Assenmacher

14 August 1993 2	Bayer Leverkusen	2–1	Bayern Munich	Leverkusen
15:30 CEST	Kirsten 2'; Paulo Sérgio 71'	Report	Thon 26' (pen.)	Stadium: Ulrich-Haberland-Stadion; Attendance: 27,400; Referee: Hartmut Strampe (Handorf)

22 August 1993 3	Bayern Munich	5–0	Dynamo Dresden	Munich
18:00 CEST	Schupp 32'; Nerlinger 45'; Scholl 47', 57'; Ziege 50'	Report		Stadium: Olympiastadion; Attendance: 28,000; Referee: Alfons Berg (Konz)

29 August 1993 4	VfB Stuttgart	2–2	Bayern Munich	Stuttgart
18:00 CEST	Frontzeck 13'; Walter 47'	Report	Valencia 11'; Witeczek 15'	Stadium: Gottlieb-Daimler-Stadion; Attendance: 53,700; Referee: Hans Fux (Stutensee)

1 September 1993 5	Bayern Munich	3–0	VfB Leipzig	Munich
20:00 CEST	Nerlinger 13'; Matthäus 55'; Schupp 88'	Report		Stadium: Olympiastadion; Attendance: 30,000; Referee: Jürgen Aust (Cologne)

4 September 1993 6	MSV Duisburg	2–2	Bayern Munich	Duisburg
15:30 CEST	Közle 3'; Reinmayr 57'	Report	Wouters 20'; Scholl 90'	Stadium: Wedaustadion; Attendance: 31,500; Referee: Karl-Josef Assenmacher

9 September 1993 7	Werder Bremen	1–0	Bayern Munich	Bremen
20:15 CEST	Hobsch 52'	Report		Stadium: Weserstadion; Attendance: 40,800; Referee: Markus Merk (Kaiserslautern)

18 September 1993 8	Bayern Munich	3–3	Wattenscheid	Munich
15:30 CEST	Witeczek 16'; Nerlinger 56'; Scholl 78'	Report	Leśniak 20', 55', 90'	Stadium: Olympiastadion; Attendance: 36,000; Referee: Hans-Jürgen Kasper

25 September 1993 9	Borussia Dortmund	1–1	Bayern Munich	Dortmund
15:30 CEST	Karl 65'	Report	Scholl 27'	Stadium: Westfalenstadion; Attendance: 42,800; Referee: Wieland Ziller

2 October 1993 10	Bayern Munich	4–0	Hamburg	Munich
15:30 CET	Helmer 40'; Schupp 63'; Valencia 74'; Scholl 80'	Report		Stadium: Olympiastadion; Attendance: 63,000; Referee: Hans-Jurgen Weber (Essen)

9 October 1993 11	Köln	0–4	Bayern Munich	Cologne
15:30 CET		Report	Scholl 14'; Jorginho 62'; Helmer 75'; Zickler 77'	Stadium: Müngersdorfer Stadion; Attendance: 54,100; Referee: Hans-Joachim Osmers

16 October 1993 12	Bayern Munich	3–1	Borussia Mönchengladbach	Munich
15:30 CET	Matthäus 3' (pen.); Schneider 40' (o.g.); Nerlinger 45'	Report	Pflipsen 51'	Stadium: Olympiastadion; Attendance: 55,000; Referee: Karl-Heinz Gläser

23 October 1993 13	Eintracht Frankfurt	2–2	Bayern Munich	Frankfurt
15:30 CET	Furtok 31'; Okocha 63'	Report	Nerlinger 35'; Matthäus 44'	Stadium: Waldstadion; Attendance: 60,360; Referee: Günther Habermann

30 October 1993 14	Bayern Munich	4–0	Kaiserslautern	Munich
15:30 CET	Ziege 16'; Valencia 29', 59'; Matthäus 68' (pen.)	Report		Stadium: Olympiastadion; Attendance: 58,000; Referee: Bernd Heynemann (Magdeburg)

6 November 1993 15	Nürnberg	2–0	Bayern Munich	Nuremberg
15:30 CET	Golke 23'; Criens 51'	Report		Stadium: Frankenstadion; Attendance: 50,200; Referee: Jürgen Aust (Cologne)

13 November 1993 16	Bayern Munich	1–0	Karlsruher SC	Munich
15:30 CET	Sternkopf 50'	Report		Stadium: Olympiastadion; Attendance: 40,000; Referee: Manfred Führer

20 November 1993 17	Schalke	1–1	Bayern Munich	Gelsenkirchen
15:30 CET	Mulder 87'	Report	Nerlinger 73'	Stadium: Parkstadion; Attendance: 57,200; Referee: Hartmut Strampe (Handorf)

27 November 1993 18	Freiburg	3–1	Bayern Munich	Freiburg
15:30 CET	Wassmer 5', 64', 83'	Report	Labbadia 86'	Stadium: Dreisamstadion; Attendance: 15,000; Referee: Volkmar Fischer

4 December 1993 19	Bayern Munich	1–1	Bayer Leverkusen	Munich
15:30 CET	Labbadia 58'	Report	Rydlewicz 53'	Stadium: Olympiastadion; Attendance: 33,000; Referee: Wieland Ziller

10 December 1993 20	Dynamo Dresden	1–1	Bayern Munich	Dresden
20:00 CET	Marschall 21'	Report	Labbadia 85'	Stadium: Rudolf-Harbig-Stadion; Attendance: 24,000; Referee: Karl-Josef Assenmacher

13 February 1994 21	Bayern Munich	1–3	VfB Stuttgart	Munich
20:00 CET	Matthäus 22' (pen.)	Report	Buchwald 4'; Walter 50'; Buck 84'	Stadium: Olympiastadion; Attendance: 34,000; Referee: Wolf-Günter Wiesel

19 February 1994 22	VfB Leipzig	1–3	Bayern Munich	Leipzig
15:30 CET	Anders 53'	Report	Scholl 2'; Nerlinger 3'; Ziege 31'	Stadium: Zentralstadion; Attendance: 37,000; Referee: Hellmut Krug (Gelsenkirchen)

26 February 1994 23	Bayern Munich	4–0	MSV Duisburg	Munich
15:30 CET	Nerlinger 4'; Labbadia 35', 37'; Valencia 44'	Report		Stadium: Olympiastadion; Attendance: 38,000; Referee: Manfred Harder

5 March 1994 24	Bayern Munich	2–0	Werder Bremen	Munich
15:30 CET	Nerlinger 47'; Valencia 66'	Report		Stadium: Olympiastadion; Attendance: 63,000; Referee: Georg Dardenne

12 March 1994 25	Wattenscheid	1–3	Bayern Munich	Wattenscheid
15:30 CET	Bach 88'	Report	Valencia 51'; Matthäus 65'; Frey 69'	Stadium: Ruhrstadion; Attendance: 32,000; Referee: Lutz Michael Frölich

20 March 1994 26	Bayern Munich	0–0	Borussia Dortmund	Munich
18:00 CET		Report		Stadium: Olympiastadion; Attendance: 42,000; Referee: Hartmut Strampe

27 March 1994 27	Hamburg	1–2	Bayern Munich	Hamburg
20:00 CEST	Albertz 54'	Report	Valencia 75'; Sternkopf 77'	Stadium: Volksparkstadion; Attendance: 60,000; Referee: Edgar Steinborn

2 April 1994 28	Bayern Munich	1–0	Köln	Munich
15:30 CEST	Valencia 66'	Report		Stadium: Olympiastadion; Attendance: 52,000; Referee: Manfred Schmidt

5 April 1994 29	Borussia Mönchengladbach	2–0	Bayern Munich	Mönchengladbach
20:00 CEST	Herrlich 88', 90'	Report		Stadium: Bökelbergstadion; Attendance: 34,000; Referee: Bernd Heynemann (Magdeburg)

9 April 1994 30	Bayern Munich	2–1	Eintracht Frankfurt	Munich
15:30 CEST	Scholl 39'; Matthäus 54' (pen.)	Report	Yeboah 45'	Stadium: Olympiastadion; Attendance: 63,000; Referee: Jürgen Aust (Cologne)

14 April 1994 31	Kaiserslautern	4–0	Bayern Munich	Kaiserslautern
15:30 CEST	Wagner 58'; Kuka 65', 89'; Sforza 85'	Report		Stadium: Fritz-Walter-Stadion; Attendance: 40,000; Referee: Manfred Harder

3 May 1994 32	Bayern Munich	5–0	Nürnberg	Munich
20:15 CEST	Scholl 47', 58'; Labbadia 79', 88'; Hamann 83'	Report		Stadium: Olympiastadion; Attendance: 63,000; Referee: Bernd Heynemann (Magdeburg)

30 April 1994 33	Karlsruher SC	1–1	Bayern Munich	Karlsruhe
15:30 CEST	Rolff 34'	Report	Witeczek 8'	Stadium: Wildparkstadion; Attendance: 33,700; Referee: Hellmut Krug (Gelsenkirchen)

7 May 1994 34	Bayern Munich	2–0	Schalke	Munich
15:30 CEST	Matthäus 49'; Jorginho 60'	Report		Stadium: Olympiastadion; Attendance: 63,000; Referee: Lutz Michael Frölich

==== Results by round ====
Round	1	2	3	4	5	6	7	8	9	10	11	12	13	14	15	16	17	18	19	20	21	22	23	24	25	26	27	28	29	30	31	32	33	34
Ground	H	A	H	A	H	A	H	H	A	H	A	H	A	H	A	H	A	A	H	A	H	A	H	H	A	H	A	H	A	H	A	H	A	H
Result	W	L	W	D	W	D	L	D	D	W	W	W	D	W	L	W	D	L	D	D	L	W	W	W	W	D	W	W	L	W	L	W	D	W
Position	5	8	4	5	3	5	6	7	7	6	4	3	3	2	2	2	2	4	3	3	5	2	1	1	1	1	1	1	1	1	1	1	1	1

Source: Kicker
A = Away; H = Home; W = Win; D = Draw; L = Loss

=== DFB Pokal ===
2 August 1993 1st round	Werder Bremen II	1–5	Bayern Munich	Bremen
20:15 CEST	Simonsen 59'	Report	Labbadia 33', 63', 64'; Valencia 62'; Matthäus 81'	Stadium: Weserstadion, Platz 11; Attendance: 8,500; Referee: Norbert Haupt (Berlin)

25 August 1993 2nd round	Carl Zeiss Jena II	0–2	Bayern Munich	Jena
20:00 CEST		Report	Wouters 6'; Nerlinger 61'	Stadium: Ernst-Abbe-Sportfeld; Attendance: 7,800; Referee: Frank Kiefer (Baunatal)

12 September 1993 3rd round	Schalke	2–3 (a.e.t.)	Bayern Munich	Gelsenkirchen
20:15 CEST	Eckstein 27'; Mulder 113'	Report	Kreuzer 87', 114'; Ziege 120'	Stadium: Parkstadion; Attendance: 38,700; Referee: Guenther Habermann (Weißensee)

9 November 1993 Round of 16	Dynamo Dresden	2–1	Bayern Munich	Dresden
20:00 CET	Penksa 21'; Marschall 89'	Report	Scholl 78'	Stadium: Rudolf-Harbig-Stadion; Attendance: 23,700; Referee: Alfons Berg (Konz)

=== UEFA Cup ===
15 September 1993 1st Round; 1st leg	Twente	3–4	Bayern Munich	Enschede, Netherlands
	Boerebach 65'; Polley 72'; Vurens 77'	Report	Nerlinger 11'; Ziege 28', 90'; Scholl 67'	Stadium: Diekman Stadion; Attendance: 15,000; Referee: Coroado (Portugal)

29 September 1993 1st round 2nd leg	Bayern Munich	3–0 (7–3 agg.)	Twente	Munich, Germany
	Matthäus 19'; Karneeek 45' (o.g.); Ziege 62'	Report		Stadium: Olympiastadion; Attendance: 24,000; Referee: Alfredo Trentalange (Italy)

20 October 1993 2nd round 1st leg	Bayern Munich	1-2	Norwich City	Munich, Germany
	Nerlinger 41'	Report	Goss 13'; Bowen 29'	Stadium: Olympiastadion; Attendance: 28,500; Referee: Leif Sundell (Sweden)

3 November 1993 2nd round 2nd leg	Norwich City	1-1 (3–2 agg.)	Bayern Munich	Norwich, England
	Goss 51'	Report	Valencia 5'	Stadium: Carrow Road; Attendance: 20,600; Referee: van den Wijngaert (Belgium)

== Sources ==
- Soccerbase.com
- kicker
