= List of clubs in the Bundesliga =

This is a list of clubs in the Bundesliga. It records all 59 clubs who have played in the 64 seasons of the Bundesliga since its introduction in 1963. The placings section is split into two periods, before and after German reunification, which took place during the league's 1990–91 season, in October 1990. For the following season, clubs from former East Germany joined the league.

== List of clubs ==
The list of clubs of the Bundesliga from its inception to the present season, sorted by the number of seasons a club played in the league.

As of 2026–27 season (64 seasons total).

Club	Sea- sons	Cons. seas.	First season	Last season	Best result	Titles	Seasons of best result	Curr. level
Bayern Munich	62	62	1965–66	Present	1st	34	34 seasons (Note: Seasons Bayern Munich finished 1st: 1968–69, 1971–72, 1972–73, 1973–74, 1979–80, 1980–81, 1984–85, 1985–86, 1986–87, 1988–89, 1989–90, 1993–94, 1996–97, 1998–99, 1999–2000, 2000–01, 2002–03, 2004–05, 2005–06, 2007–08, 2009–10, 2012–13, 2013–14, 2014–15, 2015–16, 2016–17, 2017–18, 2018–19, 2019–20, 2020–21, 2021–22, 2022–23, 2024–25, 2025–26)	I
Werder Bremen	62	5	1963–64	Present	1st	4	1964–65, 1987–88, 1992–93, 2003–04	I
Borussia Dortmund	60	51	1963–64	Present	1st	5	1994–95, 1995–96, 2001–02, 2010–11, 2011–12	I
VfB Stuttgart	60	7	1963–64	Present	1st	3	1983–84, 1991–92, 2006–07	I
Borussia Mönchengladbach	59	19	1965–66	Present	1st	5	1969–70, 1970–71, 1974–75, 1975–76, 1976–77	I
Eintracht Frankfurt	58	15	1963–64	Present	3rd	—	1963–64, 1974–75, 1989–90, 1991–92, 1992–93	I
Hamburger SV	57	2	1963–64	Present	1st	3	1978–79, 1981–82, 1982–83	I
Schalke 04	55	1	1963–64	Present	2nd	—	7 seasons (Note: Seasons Schalke 04 finished 2nd: 1971–72, 1976–77, 2000–01, 2004–05, 2006–07, 2009–10, 2017–18)	I
1. FC Köln	54	2	1963–64	Present	1st	2	1963–64, 1977–78	I
Bayer Leverkusen	48	48	1979–80	Present	1st	1	2023–24	I
1. FC Kaiserslautern	44	–	1963–64	2011–12	1st	2	1990–91, 1997–98	II
Hertha BSC	40	–	1963–64	2022–23	2nd	—	1974–75	II
VfL Bochum	38	–	1971–72	2024–25	5th	—	1996–97, 2003–04	II
1. FC Nürnberg	33	–	1963–64	2018–19	1st	1	1967–68	II
Hannover 96	30	–	1964–65	2018–19	4th	—	2010–11	II
VfL Wolfsburg	29	–	1997–98	2025–26	1st	1	2008–09	II
MSV Duisburg	28	–	1963–64	2007–08	2nd	—	1963–64	III
SC Freiburg	27	11	1993–94	Present	3rd	—	1994–95	I
Fortuna Düsseldorf	25	–	1966–67	2019–20	3rd	—	1972–73, 1973–74	III
Karlsruher SC	24	–	1963–64	2008–09	6th	—	1992–93, 1993–94, 1996–97	II
Mainz 05	21	18	2004–05	Present	5th	—	2010–11	I
Eintracht Braunschweig	21	–	1963–64	2013–14	1st	1	1966–67	II
1860 Munich	20	–	1963–64	2003–04	1st	1	1965–66	IV
TSG Hoffenheim	19	19	2008–09	Present	3rd	—	2017–18	I
Arminia Bielefeld	19	–	1970–71	2021–22	8th	—	1982–83, 1983–84	II
FC Augsburg	16	16	2011–12	Present	5th	—	2014–15	I
KFC Uerdingen	14	–	1975–76	1995–96	3rd	—	1985–86	V
Hansa Rostock	12	–	1991–92	2007–08	6th	—	1995–96, 1997–98	III
RB Leipzig	11	11	2016–17	Present	2nd	—	2016–17, 2020–21	I
FC St. Pauli	10	–	1977–78	2025–26	10th	—	1988–89	II
Union Berlin	8	8	2019–20	Present	4th	—	2022–23	I
Waldhof Mannheim	7	–	1983–84	1989–90	6th	—	1984–85	III
Kickers Offenbach	7	–	1968–69	1983–84	7th	—	1972–73	IV
Rot-Weiss Essen	7	–	1966–67	1976–77	8th	—	1975–76	III
Energie Cottbus	6	–	2000–01	2008–09	13th	—	2001–02, 2006–07	II
Darmstadt 98	5	–	1978–79	2023–24	14th	—	2015–16	II
1. FC Saarbrücken	5	–	1963–64	1992–93	14th	—	1976–77	III
Alemannia Aachen	4	–	1967–68	2006–07	2nd	—	1968–69	III
Dynamo Dresden	4	–	1991–92	1994–95	13th	—	1993–94	II
Wattenscheid 09	4	–	1990–91	1993–94	11th	—	1990–91	IV
Rot-Weiß Oberhausen	4	–	1969–70	1972–73	14th	—	1969–70	IV
SC Paderborn	3	1	2014–15	Present	18th	—	2014–15, 2019–20	I
1. FC Heidenheim	3	–	2023–24	2025–26	8th	—	2023–24	II
FC 08 Homburg	3	–	1986–87	1989–90	16th	—	1986–87	IV
Wuppertaler SV	3	–	1972–73	1974–75	4th	—	1972–73	V
Borussia Neunkirchen	3	–	1964–65	1967–68	10th	—	1964–65	VII
Greuther Fürth	2	–	2012–13	2021–22	18th	—	2012–13, 2021–22	II
FC Ingolstadt	2	–	2015–16	2016–17	11th	—	2015–16	III
SpVgg Unterhaching	2	–	1999–2000	2000–01	10th	—	1999–2000	IV
Stuttgarter Kickers	2	–	1988–89	1991–92	17th	—	1988–89, 1991–92	IV
Tennis Borussia Berlin	2	–	1974–75	1976–77	17th	—	1974–75, 1976–77	V
SV Elversberg	1	1	2026–27	Present	—	—	—	I
Holstein Kiel	1	—	2024–25	2024–25	17th	—	2024–25	II
SSV Ulm	1	–	1999–2000	1999–2000	16th	—	1999–2000	IV
VfB Leipzig (Note: Club became defunct, but was re-founded as Lokomotive Leipzig.)	1	–	1993–94	1993–94	18th	—	1993–94	IV
Blau-Weiß 1890 Berlin (Note: Club became defunct, but was re-founded as SpVg Blau-Weiß 90 Berlin.)	1	–	1986–87	1986–87	18th	—	1986–87	VI
Fortuna Köln	1	–	1973–74	1973–74	17th	—	1973–74	III
Tasmania Berlin (Note: Club became defunct, but was re-founded as SV Tasmania Berlin.)	1	–	1965–66	1965–66	18th	—	1965–66	IV
Preußen Münster	1	–	1963–64	1963–64	15th	—	1963–64	III

=== Key ===
Club	Name of club
Seasons	Number of seasons in league
Cons. seas.	Number of consecutive seasons in league
First season	First season in league
Last season	Last season in league
Best result	Best result in league
Titles	Number of league titles won
Seasons of best result	Seasons best result occurred in
Curr. level	Current level (2026–27) in German league system

== Placings ==
=== Placings from 1963 to 1991 ===
The placings in the Bundesliga from its inception to the last season before German reunification:

Club	64	65	66	67	68	69	70	71	72	73	74	75	76	77	78	79	80	81	82	83	84	85	86	87	88	89	90	91
1. FC Kaiserslautern	12	13	15	5	16	15	10	8	7	9	6	13	7	13	8	3	3	4	4	6	12	11	11	7	14	9	12	1
Bayern Munich			3	6	5	1	2	2	1	1	1	10	3	7	12	4	1	1	3	4	4	1	1	1	2	1	1	2
Werder Bremen	10	1	4	16	2	9	11	10	11	11	11	15	13	11	15	11	17		5	2	5	2	2	5	1	3	7	3
Eintracht Frankfurt	3	8	7	4	6	8	8	15	5	8	4	3	9	4	7	5	9	5	8	10	16	12	15	15	9	16	3	4
Hamburger SV	6	11	9	14	13	6	6	5	10	14	12	4	2	6	10	1	2	2	1	1	2	5	7	2	6	4	11	5
VfB Stuttgart	5	12	11	12	8	5	7	12	8	6	9	16			4	2	3	3	9	3	1	10	5	12	4	5	6	6
1. FC Köln	1	2	5	7	4	13	4	11	4	2	5	5	4	5	1	6	5	8	2	5	6	3	13	10	3	2	2	7
Bayer Leverkusen																	12	11	16	11	7	13	6	6	8	8	5	8
Borussia Mönchengladbach			13	8	3	3	1	1	3	5	2	1	1	1	2	10	7	6	7	12	3	4	4	3	7	6	15	9
Borussia Dortmund	4	3	2	3	14	16	5	13	17					8	11	12	6	7	6	7	13	14	16	4	13	7	4	10
SG Wattenscheid																												11
Fortuna Düsseldorf				17					13	3	3	6	12	12	5	7	11	13	15	9	14	15	14	17			9	12
Karlsruher SC	13	15	16	13	18								15	16				10	14	17		17			15	11	10	13
VfL Bochum									9	12	14	11	14	15	14	8	10	9	10	13	15	9	9	11	12	15	16	14
1. FC Nürnberg	9	6	6	10	1	17										17		14	13	14	18		12	9	5	14	8	15
FC St. Pauli															18											10	13	16
KFC Uerdingen													18				15	18			10	7	3	8	11	13	14	17
Hertha BSC	14	14				14	3	3	6	13	8	2	11	10	3	14	16			18								18
Waldhof Mannheim																					11	6	8	14	16	12	17	
FC 08 Homburg																								16	17		18	
Stuttgarter Kickers																										17		
Hannover 96		5	12	9	10	11	13	9	16	16	18		16										18		10	18		
Schalke 04	8	16	14	15	15	7	9	6	2	15	7	7	6	2	9	15	8	17		16		8	10	13	18			
Blau-Weiß 1890 Berlin																								18				
1. FC Saarbrücken	16													14	17								17					
Arminia Bielefeld								14	18							16		15	12	8	8	16						
Eintracht Braunschweig	11	9	10	1	9	4	16	4	12	17		9	5	3	13	9	18		11	15	9	18						
Kickers Offenbach						18		17		7	10	8	17								17							
Darmstadt 98																18			17									
MSV Duisburg	2	7	8	11	7	12	15	7	14	10	15	14	10	9	6	13	14	12	18									
1860 Munich	7	4	1	2	12	10	17								16		13	16										
Tennis Borussia Berlin												17		17														
Rot-Weiss Essen				18			12	18			13	12	8	18														
Wuppertaler SV										4	16	18																
Fortuna Köln											17																	
Rot-Weiß Oberhausen							14	16	15	18																		
Alemannia Aachen					11	2	18																					
Borussia Neunkirchen		10	17		17																							
Tasmania Berlin			18																									
Preußen Münster	15																											

=== Placings from 1991 to the present season ===
The placings in the Bundesliga from German reunificaton to the present season:

Club	92	93	94	95	96	97	98	99	00	01	02	03	04	05	06	07	08	09	10	11	12	13	14	15	16	17	18	19	20	21	22	23	24	25	26
Bayern Munich	10	2	1	6	2	1	2	1	1	1	3	1	2	1	1	4	1	2	1	3	2	1	1	1	1	1	1	1	1	1	1	1	3	1	1
Borussia Dortmund	2	4	4	1	1	3	10	4	11	3	1	3	6	7	7	9	13	6	5	1	1	2	2	7	2	3	4	2	2	3	2	2	5	4	2
RB Leipzig																										2	6	3	3	2	4	3	4	7	3
VfB Stuttgart	1	7	7	12	10	4	4	11	8	15	8	2	4	5	9	1	6	3	6	12	6	12	15	14	17		7	16		9	15	16	2	9	4
TSG Hoffenheim																		7	11	11	11	16	9	8	15	4	3	9	6	11	9	12	7	15	5
Bayer Leverkusen	6	5	3	7	14	2	3	2	2	4	2	15	3	6	5	5	7	9	4	2	5	3	4	4	3	12	5	4	5	6	3	6	1	2	6
SC Freiburg			15	3	11	17		12	12	6	16		13	18					14	9	12	5	14	17		7	15	13	8	10	6	5	10	5	7
Eintracht Frankfurt	3	3	5	9	17			15	14	17			16		14	14	9	13	10	17		6	13	9	16	11	8	7	9	5	11	7	6	3	8
FC Augsburg																					14	15	8	5	12	13	12	15	15	13	14	15	11	12	9
Mainz 05														11	11	16			9	5	13	13	7	11	6	15	14	12	13	12	8	9	13	6	10
Union Berlin																													11	7	5	4	15	13	11
Borussia Mönchengladbach	13	9	10	5	4	11	15	18			12	12	11	15	10	18		15	12	16	4	8	6	3	4	9	9	5	4	8	10	10	14	10	12
Hamburger SV	12	11	12	13	5	13	9	7	3	13	11	4	8	8	3	7	4	5	7	8	15	7	16	16	10	14	17								13
1. FC Köln	4	12	11	10	12	10	17			10	17		18		17			12	13	10	17			12	9	5	18		14	16	7	11	17		14
Werder Bremen	9	1	8	2	9	8	7	13	9	7	6	6	1	3	2	3	2	10	3	13	9	14	12	10	13	8	11	8	16	17		13	9	8	15
VfL Wolfsburg							14	6	7	9	10	8	10	9	15	15	5	1	8	15	8	11	5	2	8	16	16	6	7	4	12	8	12	11	16
1. FC Heidenheim																																	8	16	17
FC St. Pauli					15	18					18									18														14	18
Holstein Kiel																																		17	
VfL Bochum	15	16		16		5	12	17		18		9	5	16		8	12	14	17												13	14	16	18	
Darmstadt 98																									14	18							18		
Schalke 04	11	10	14	11	3	12	5	10	13	2	5	7	7	2	4	2	3	8	2	14	3	4	3	6	5	10	2	14	12	18		17			
Hertha BSC							11	3	6	5	4	5	12	4	6	10	10	4	18		16		11	15	7	6	10	11	10	14	16	18			
Arminia Bielefeld						14	18		17			16		13	13	12	15	18												15	17				
Greuther Fürth																						18									18				
Fortuna Düsseldorf	20				13	16																17						10	17						
SC Paderborn																								18					18						
Hannover 96												11	14	10	12	11	8	11	15	4	7	9	10	13	18		13	17							
1. FC Nürnberg	7	14	16					16			15	17		14	8	6	16		16	6	10	10	17					18							
FC Ingolstadt																									11	17									
Eintracht Braunschweig																							18												
1. FC Kaiserslautern	5	8	2	4	16		1	5	5	8	7	14	15	12	16					7	18														
Energie Cottbus										14	13	18				13	14	16																	
Karlsruher SC	8	6	6	8	7	6	16										11	17																	
Hansa Rostock	18				6	15	6	14	15	12	14	13	9	17			17																		
MSV Duisburg	19		9	17		9	8	8	18						18		18																		
Alemannia Aachen																17																			
1860 Munich				14	8	7	13	9	4	11	9	10	17																						
SpVgg Unterhaching									10	16																									
SSV Ulm									16																										
KFC Uerdingen		17		15	18																														
Dynamo Dresden	14	15	13	18																															
SG Wattenscheid	16	13	17																																
VfB Leipzig			18																																
1. FC Saarbrücken		18																																	
Stuttgarter Kickers	17																																		

=== Key for placings ===
German Champions	German Cup winner	German Champions and Cup winner	Relegated	Relegated and Cup winner

- The two digit year is the year in which the season finishes.
