= Thorsten Ott =

German footballer

Personal information
- Date of birth: 18 June 1973 (age 53)
- Place of birth: Germany
- Positions: Midfielder; forward

Youth career
- –1991: Kickers Offenbach

Senior career*
Years	Team	Apps	(Gls)
1991–1994	Bayern Munich (A)		
1991–1992	→ Bayern Munich	1	(0)
–1996	SV Selingenstadt		
1996–1998	SV Wehen		
1998–2003	SG 1945 Dietzenbach		
- * Club domestic league appearances and goals

Thorsten Ott (born 18 June 1973) is a German former footballer. After playing as a youth with Kickers Offenbach, he joined Bayern Munich as an 18-year-old, and was thrown into the first team in August 1991, replacing Michael Sternkopf in a 2–0 home defeat against VfL Bochum. This was to be his only appearance for Bayern, though, and after two years in the reserve team, he left the club, moving into amateur football.
