= Bruno Labbadia =

German football player and manager (born 1966)

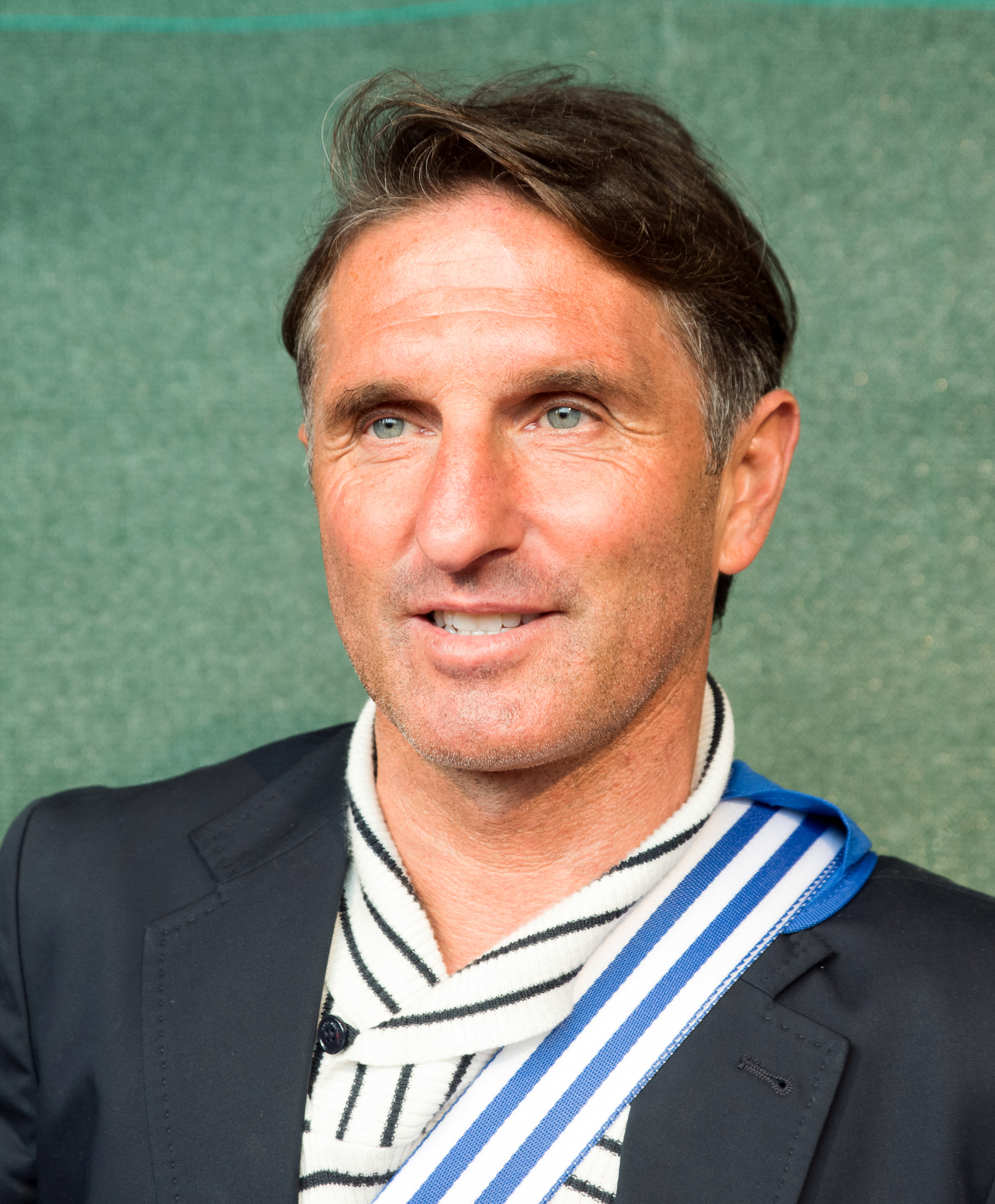
- Labbadia in 2016

Personal information
- Date of birth: 8 February 1966 (age 60)
- Place of birth: Darmstadt, West Germany
- Height: 1.78 m (5 ft 10 in)
- Position: Striker

Youth career
- 1972–1976: FSV Schneppenhausen
- 1977–1983: SV Weiterstadt
- 1983–1984: Darmstadt 98

Senior career*
Years	Team	Apps	(Gls)
1984–1987	Darmstadt 98	105	(44)
1987–1988	Hamburger SV	41	(11)
1988–1991	1. FC Kaiserslautern	67	(20)
1991–1994	Bayern Munich	82	(28)
1994–1995	1. FC Köln	41	(15)
1995–1998	Werder Bremen	63	(18)
1998–2001	Arminia Bielefeld	98	(50)
2001–2003	Karlsruher SC	60	(18)
Total		557	(204)

International career
1987	West Germany U-21	6	(3)
1992–1995	Germany	2	(0)

Managerial career
- 2003–2006: Darmstadt 98
- 2007–2008: Greuther Fürth
- 2008–2009: Bayer Leverkusen
- 2009–2010: Hamburger SV
- 2010–2013: VfB Stuttgart
- 2015–2016: Hamburger SV
- 2018–2019: VfL Wolfsburg
- 2020–2021: Hertha BSC
- 2022–2023: VfB Stuttgart
- * Club domestic league appearances and goals

Bruno Labbadia (pronounced [labbaˈdiːa]; born 8 February 1966) is a German football manager and former professional player who played as a striker. During his playing career, he achieved notable success, winning the DFB-Pokal in the 1989–90 season with 1. FC Kaiserslautern and the Bundesliga title in 1993–94 with FC Bayern Munich. Labbadia also earned two caps for the German national team, representing his country at the international level.

As a manager, Labbadia has coached several Bundesliga clubs, most recently VfB Stuttgart. He was considered for the role of head coach of the Nigeria national football team, but ultimately declined the position. Labbadia is well-regarded for his ability to stabilize teams facing relegation challenges, making him a prominent figure in German football management.

== Early life ==
Labbadia was born in Darmstadt, West Germany, to Italian parents. His family roots trace back to Lenola, a town in the Lazio region of Italy. Labbadia's parents moved to Germany as Gastarbeiter (guest workers) and settled in Schneppenhausen, near Darmstadt in the state of Hesse. He grew up in a football-loving household alongside his eight siblings. Initially, the family lived on a rented farm before relocating to Weiterstadt when Labbadia was ten years old.

== Playing career ==
Labbadia made his debut for his hometown 2. Bundesliga side Darmstadt 98 in 1984–85, scoring 9 goals in 33 games. Labbadia recorded 103 goals in 328 Bundesliga games across his career, including 50 goals for Arminia Bielefeld and 44 goals for his hometown club Darmstadt 98, as well as scoring 101 goals in 229 Bundesliga 2 games. He netted a total of 229 goals across all competitions in his career. having played for some of Germany's top Bundesliga clubs. He had two caps for the Germany national football team. His most successful season was probably the 1998–99 season, where he scored 29 goals for Arminia Bielefeld. Other notable seasons include 1986–87, where he scored 21 goals for Darmstadt 98, as well as 15 goal campaigns in 1987–88 and 1994–95 with top-flight clubs Hamburger SV and 1. FC Köln.

In the 1989–90 season, he scored twice in the final as his club 1. FC Kaiserslautern beat Werder Bremen 3–2 in the final of the DFB-Pokal.

He also had 14 goals in his 1992–93 campaign with Bayern Munich and had 10 goals the next season where he was limited to only 23 appearances. His final season was in 2002–03 with 2. Bundesliga side Karlsruher SC, where he netted 13 goals in 28 appearances.

== Managerial career ==
=== Early career ===
Labbadia was hired as the manager of Darmstadt 98 on 8 May 2003. His first match was a 2–1 win against TSG Wörsdorf. In his first season, Darmstadt won promotion to the Regionalliga. Darmstadt started the 2004–05 season with a 2–1 loss to Mainz 05 II. Darmstadt finished the 2004–05 season in fifth place. Darmstadt started the 2005–06 season with a 2–1 win against VfR Aalen. Darmstadt finished the season in fifth place. Labbadia left on 30 June 2006. His final match was a 6–0 against SpVgg Bayreuth.

Labbadia was hired as Greuther Fürth's manager on 19 March 2007. Labbadia officially took over on 1 July 2007 when pre-season officially started. His first match was a 3–1 win against Darmstadt in the German Cup. Greuther Fürth finished the season in sixth place. He left the club on 26 May 2008 when he officially joined Bayer Leverkusen. Labbadia finished with a record of 15 wins, 10 draws, and 11 losses.

=== Bayer Leverkusen ===
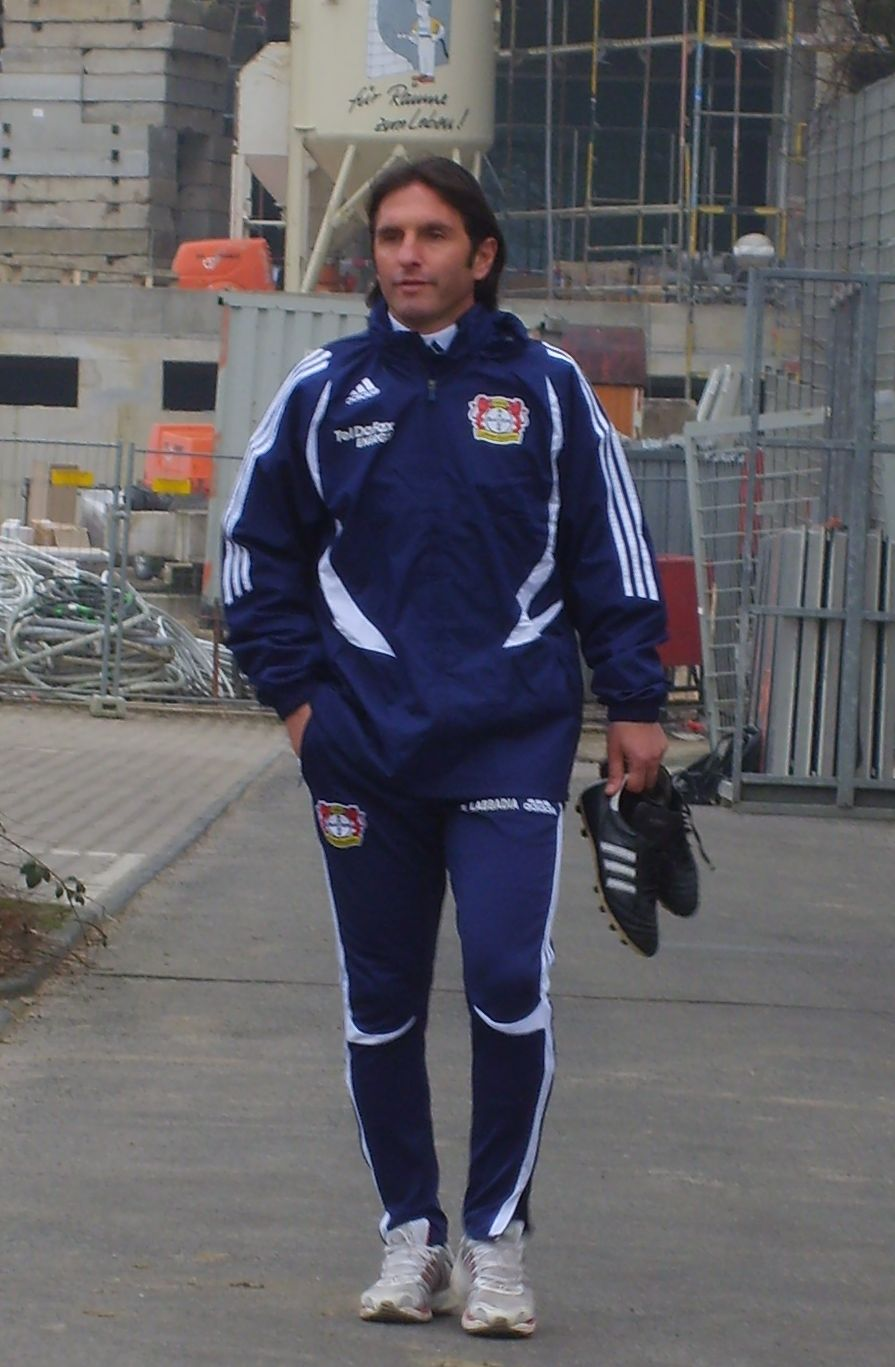
Labbadia with Leverkusen in 2009

Labbadia was hired by Bayer Leverkusen on 26 May 2008. His first match was a 3–2 win against Rot-Weiß Oberhausen in the German Cup. Bayer leverkusen finished the season in ninth place. After the season, Labaddia left Bayer Leverkusen and joined Hamburger SV. His final match was a 0–1 loss to Werder Bremen in the 2009 German Cup Final. Labbadia finished with a record of 19 wins, seven draws, and 14 losses.

=== Hamburger SV ===
Labaddia took over as Hamburg manager on 5 June 2009. His first match was a 4–0 win against Randers FC in the third qualifying round of the Europa League. Labbadia was dismissed on 26 April 2010, just three days before the Europa League semi-final second-leg tie against Fulham. His final match was a 5–1 loss to 1899 Hoffenheim. Hamburg were in seventh place in the 2009–10 Bundesliga table when they dismissed Labbadia. Labbadia finished with a record of 22 wins, 16 draws, and 13 losses.

=== VfB Stuttgart ===
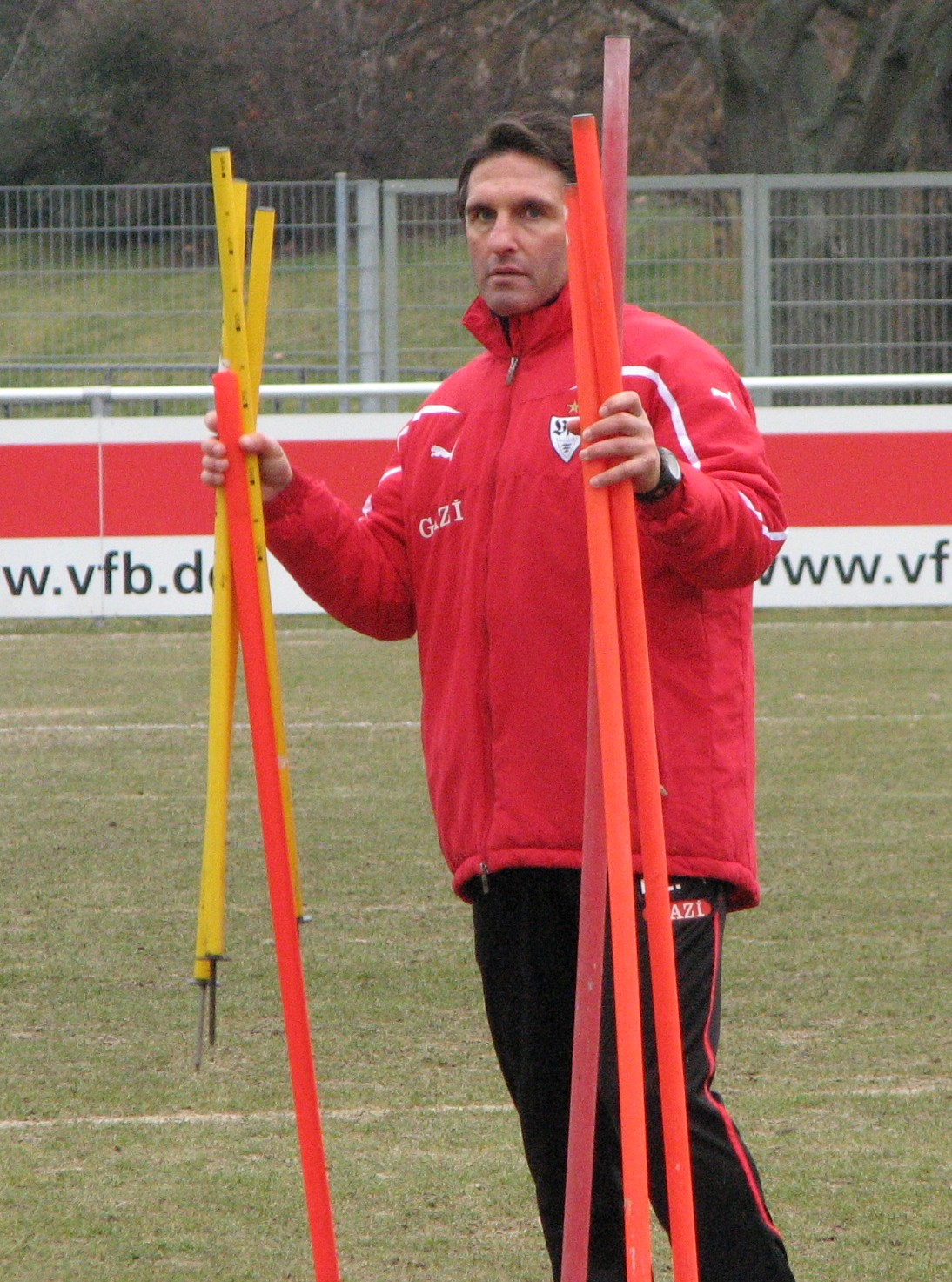
Labbadia managing VfB Stuttgart

On 12 December 2010 Labbadia became the new manager of VfB Stuttgart. His first match was a 5–1 win against Odense in the Europa League. In his first season with the club, he managed to save the club that was staring relegation in the face after the disastrous reigns of his two predecessors, Christian Gross and Jens Keller, ended in the last quarter of 2010. VfB Stuttgart finished in 12th place in the 2010–11 Bundesliga, and would then qualify for the 2012–13 UEFA Europa League by virtue of its sixth position in the 2011–12 Bundesliga.

Stuttgart started the 2012–13 season with a 5–0 win against SV Falkensee-Finkenkrug. On 30 January 2013, Labbadia signed a contract extension with Stuttgart, keeping him at the club until the summer of 2015. VfB Stuttgart lost the 2012–13 DFB-Pokal final to FC Bayern Munich, but qualified for the 2013–14 UEFA Europa League by virtue of the fact that Bayern Munich had also won the 2012–13 Bundesliga title.

In the morning of 26 August 2013, Labbadia was relieved of his duties with immediate effect. His club had lost the opening three Bundesliga matches and was in second last position in the Bundesliga table of the 2013–14 season. Prior to his sacking, Stuttgart had lost the first leg of the playoff round of the Europa League. During the press conference held in the afternoon on the same day, club president Bernd Wahler said, "Bruno Labbadia has done good work at VfB over the past three years but we want to provide fresh impetus with this change." Labbadia finished with a record of 50 wins, 24 draws, and 45 losses.

=== Return to Hamburg ===
Labaddia returned to Hamburger SV for a second spell on 15 April 2015. Labbadia won his first match on 25 April 2015 against FC Augsburg. This was Hamburg's first win since February 2015. Hamburg finished the 2014–15 season in the relegation playoff spot. In the first leg of the relegation playoff, on 28 May 2015, Hamburg and Karlsruher SC finished in a 1–1 draw. In the second leg, on 1 June 2015, Hamburg won 2–1 in extra time. Labbadia managed to keep Hamburg in the Bundesliga with a 10th-placed finish in the 2015–16 Bundesliga. However, Hamburg were knocked out of the German Cup in the first round during the 2015–16 season. Labbadia and his two assistants were sacked on 25 September 2016 after Hamburg had dropped into 16th position following their 0–1 Bundesliga defeat to Bayern Munich on the previous day, which was their fourth Bundesliga defeat in a row, having started the 2016–17 Bundesliga campaign with a draw at home to FC Ingolstadt.

=== VfL Wolfsburg ===
On 20 February 2018, Labbadia was hired by VfL Wolfsburg, replacing Martin Schmidt, who had stepped down the day before. His first match was a 1–1 draw against 1. FSV Mainz 05 on 23 February 2018. Wolfsburg finished the 2017–18 season in 16th place, which qualified Wolfsburg for the relegation playoff against Holstein Kiel. Labbadia left Wolfsburg after the 2018–19 season, which the team finished in sixth place, qualifying for the 2019–20 UEFA Europa League.

=== Hertha BSC ===
Labbadia was appointed as the new manager of Hertha BSC on 9 April 2020. He coached the last nine matches in the 2019–20 season, finishing with a record of four wins, one draw, and four losses. Hertha BSC finished in 10th place. He was sacked on 24 January 2021.

=== Return to Stuttgart ===
Labbadia returned to Stuttgart in December 2022. In April 2023, he was sacked after the team dropped to the last place.

== Personal life ==
Labbadia holds dual German and Italian citizenship, reflecting his Italian heritage. Outside of football, he is known for his involvement in charitable activities and his commitment to mentoring young players. Labbadia is fluent in both German and Italian and maintains close ties to his family roots. Labbadia communicated in Italian with his parents, while he spoke German with his siblings. He acquired his secondary school leaving certificate and trained as an insurance salesman. When he was 18 years old, he gave up Italian citizenship and became a German citizen, since in Germany only two foreigners were eligible to play in one team at the time, and so he gave place to a non-German in the squad of SV Darmstadt 98. He was also associated with the German U21 national team.

== Career statistics ==
=== Club ===
Appearances and goals by club, season and competition
Club	Season	League			Cup		Continental		Total	
Club	Season	Division	Apps	Goals	Apps	Goals	Apps	Goals	Apps	Goals
Darmstadt 98	1984–85	2. Bundesliga	32	9	1	0	—		33	9
Darmstadt 98	1985–86	2. Bundesliga	38	17	1	1	—		39	18
Darmstadt 98	1986–87	2. Bundesliga	35	18	4	3	—		39	21
Darmstadt 98	Total		105	44	6	4	0	0	111	48
Hamburger SV	1987–88	Bundesliga	31	11	2	1	4	3	37	15
Hamburger SV	1988–89	Bundesliga	10	0	3	1	—		13	1
Hamburger SV	Total		41	11	5	2	4	3	50	16
1. FC Kaiserslautern	1988–89	Bundesliga	17	5	1	0	—		18	5
1. FC Kaiserslautern	1989–90	Bundesliga	28	6	6	3	—		34	9
1. FC Kaiserslautern	1990–91	Bundesliga	22	9	1	0	0	0	23	9
1. FC Kaiserslautern	Total		67	20	8	3	0	0	75	23
Bayern Munich	1991–92	Bundesliga	30	10	1	0	4	1	35	11
Bayern Munich	1992–93	Bundesliga	32	11	2	3	—		34	14
Bayern Munich	1993–94	Bundesliga	20	7	2	3	1	0	23	10
Bayern Munich	Total		82	28	5	6	5	1	92	35
1. FC Köln	1994–95	Bundesliga	33	14	5	1	—		38	15
1. FC Köln	1995–96	Bundesliga	8	1	1	0	—		9	1
1. FC Köln	Total		41	15	6	1	0	0	47	16
Werder Bremen	1995–96	Bundesliga	13	4	0	0	0	0	13	4
Werder Bremen	1996–97	Bundesliga	23	8	2	1	—		25	9
Werder Bremen	1997–98	Bundesliga	27	6	1	1	—		28	7
Werder Bremen	Total		63	18	3	2	0	0	66	20
Arminia Bielefeld	1998–99	2. Bundesliga	33	28	3	1	—		36	29
Arminia Bielefeld	1999–2000	Bundesliga	34	11	3	0	—		37	11
Arminia Bielefeld	2000–01	2. Bundesliga	31	11	2	1	—		33	12
Arminia Bielefeld	Total		98	50	8	2	0	0	106	52
Karlsruher SC	2001–02	2. Bundesliga	33	6	1	0	—		34	6
Karlsruher SC	2002–03	2. Bundesliga	27	12	1	1	—		28	13
Karlsruher SC	Total		60	18	2	1	0	0	62	19
Career total			557	204	43	21	9	4	609	229

=== Managerial record ===
As of matches played on 1 April 2023

Managerial record by team and tenure
Team	From	To	Record					Ref
Team	From	To	G	W	D	L	Win %	Ref
Darmstadt 98	1 July 2003	30 June 2006	102	60	16	26	58.82	
Greuther Fürth	1 July 2007	26 May 2008	36	15	10	11	41.67	
Bayer Leverkusen	26 May 2008	5 June 2009	40	19	7	14	47.50	
Hamburger SV	5 June 2009	26 April 2010	51	22	16	13	43.14	
VfB Stuttgart	13 December 2010	26 August 2013	119	50	24	45	42.02	
Hamburger SV	15 April 2015	25 September 2016	49	16	11	22	32.65	
VfL Wolfsburg	20 February 2018	30 June 2019	50	22	10	18	44.00	
Hertha BSC	9 April 2020	24 January 2021	28	8	6	14	28.57	
VfB Stuttgart	5 December 2022	3 April 2023	12	2	3	7	16.67	
Total			487	214	103	170	43.94	—

== Honours ==
=== As a Player ===
FC Kaiserslautern

DFB-Pokal: 1989–90

Bayern Munich

Bundesliga: 1993–94
