= Bernd Eichmann =

German footballer

Personal information
- Date of birth: 12 February 1966
- Height: 1.86 m (6 ft 1 in)
- Position: Defender

Senior career*
Years	Team	Apps	(Gls)
1985–1989	SV Saar 05 Saarbrücken		
1989–1995	1. FC Saarbrücken		
1995–1999	FC Homburg		
1999–2002	SV 07 Elversberg		
- SC Halberg Brebach

Managerial career
- 2002–2003: SV 07 Elversberg
- 2003–2012: SC Halberg Brebach
- 2012–2014: 1. FC Saarbrücken II
- 2013: 1. FC Saarbrücken (caretaker)
- 2015–: TuS Herrensohr
- * Club domestic league appearances and goals

Bernd Eichmann (born 12 February 1966) is a German former football player and manager who played as a defender.
