= Holger Gehrke =

German football player and manager (born 1960)

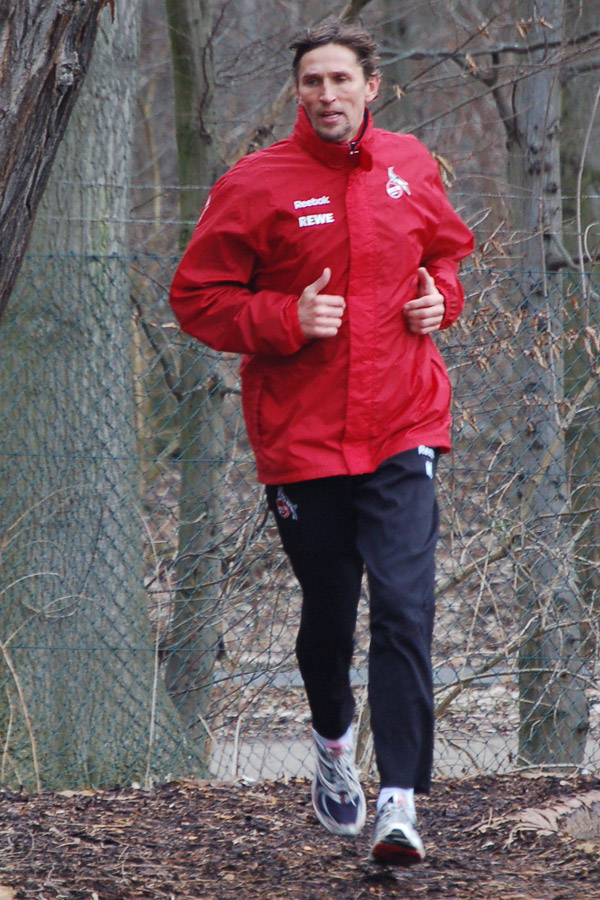
- Gehrke with 1. FC Köln in 2009

Personal information
- Full name: Holger Andreas Gehrke
- Date of birth: 22 August 1960 (age 66)
- Place of birth: East Berlin, East Germany
- Height: 1.96 m (6 ft 5 in)
- Position: Goalkeeper

Senior career*
Years	Team	Apps	(Gls)
1982–1983	1. FC Saarbrücken		
1983–1991	SpVgg Blau-Weiß 1890 Berlin	131	(0)
1992–1994	FC Schalke 04	40	(0)
1994	Tennis Borussia Berlin	8	(0)
1994–1998	MSV Duisburg	60	(0)
1998–1999	Karlsruher SC	3	(0)
Total		242	(0)

Managerial career
- 2006: 1. FC Köln
- * Club domestic league appearances and goals

Holger Andreas Gehrke (born 22 August 1960 in East Berlin) is a former professional German football player and manager.

Gehrke made 86 appearances in the Bundesliga for SpVgg Blau-Weiß 1890 Berlin, FC Schalke 04 and MSV Duisburg during his playing career.

In July 2012, Gehrke returned to Schalke, taking over as the club's new goalkeeping coach under Huub Stevens.
