= Matthias Baranowski =

German footballer

Personal information
- Date of birth: 8 February 1967 (age 59)
- Place of birth: West Germany
- Height: 1.84 m (6 ft 0 in)
- Position: Forward

Senior career*
Years	Team	Apps	(Gls)
1986–1987	Rot-Weiß Oberhausen	34	(11)
1987–1988	1. FC Köln	11	(3)
1988–1990	FC 08 Homburg	37	(7)
1990–1991	1. FC Schweinfurt 05	22	(5)
1991–1992	FC 08 Homburg	31	(5)
Total		135	(31)

International career
1987	West Germany U-21	1	(0)
- * Club domestic league appearances and goals

Matthias Baranowski (born 8 February 1967) is a former German footballer.

In 1987 Christoph Daum purchased Baranowski for 1. FC Köln, however, Baranowski failed to adapt to top-level Bundesliga football, having previously been on the books at Rot-Weiß Oberhausen.

His next teams have been then FC 08 Homburg, 1. FC Schweinfurt 05 and again FC 08 Homburg. His career ended playing for VfK Weddinghofen.
