= Max Eberl =

German football executive and former player

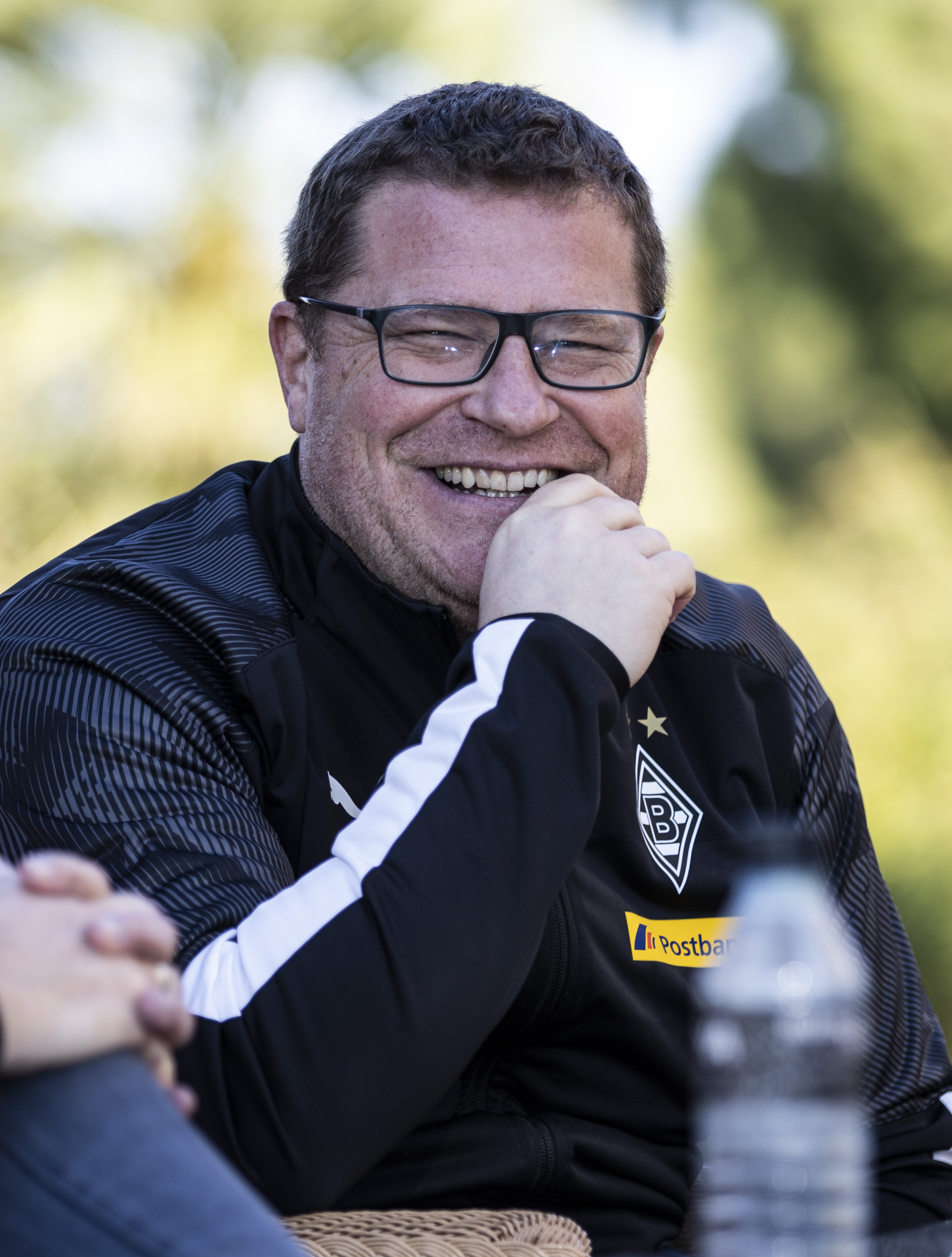
- Eberl in 2020

Personal information
- Full name: Maximilian Michael Eberl
- Date of birth: 21 September 1973 (age 53)
- Place of birth: Bogen, West Germany
- Height: 1.74 m (5 ft 9 in)
- Position: Right-back

Youth career
- 1979–1991: Bayern Munich

Senior career*
Years	Team	Apps	(Gls)
1991–1994	Bayern Munich (A)	48	(0)
1991–1994	Bayern Munich	1	(0)
1994–1997	VfL Bochum	42	(0)
1997–1999	Greuther Fürth	35	(0)
1999–2005	Borussia Mönchengladbach	137	(0)
Total		263	(0)

International career
1989–1990	Germany U-16	9	(0)
1990–1991	Germany U-17	2	(1)
1991–1992	Germany U-18	9	(0)
1992–1993	Germany U-20	8	(0)
1993–1995	Germany U-21	12	(0)

Managerial career
- 2005–2008: Borussia Mönchengladbach (academy manager)
- 2008–2022: Borussia Mönchengladbach (director of sport)
- 2022–2023: RB Leipzig (director of sport)
- 2024–: Bayern Munich (director of sport)
- * Club domestic league appearances and goals

Maximilian Michael Eberl (German pronunciation: [ˈmaks ˈeːbɐl]; born 21 September 1973) is a German professional football executive and former player who works as Bayern Munich's director of sport. He previously was the longtime director of sport of Borussia Mönchengladbach.

== Playing career ==
Born in Bogen, Eberl's career as a professional footballer began in 1991 as a defender with Bayern Munich. A highly rated youngster, he represented Germany at the 1993 FIFA World Youth Championship in Australia. During the tournament he started the group games against Ghana and Portugal.

After making only one Bundesliga appearance in two years at Munich, Eberl dropped down a division to the 2. Bundesliga to play for VfL Bochum. Eberl spent four seasons at Bochum, split evenly between the top two divisions, before moving to Greuther Fürth. He spent only 18 months playing for Greuther Fürth before moving to Borussia Mönchengladbach halfway through the 1998–99 season. Eberl saw out the rest of his career with Mönchengladbach, retiring in 2005. In a career lasting over 200 games in the first and second Bundesliga, Eberl did not score a single goal.

== Executive career ==
=== Borussia Mönchengladbach ===
At the beginning of 2005, Eberl worked as youth coordinator at Borussia Mönchengladbach; he was still officially part of the squad for the 2004/05 season.

After head coach Jos Luhukay was dismissed on 5 October 2008, Eberl and Steffen Korell took over responsibility for finding a new coach; sports director Christian Ziege coached the professional team as interim coach.

When Borussia and Eberl's former head coach Hans Meyer took over as head coach on 19 October 2008, Eberl took over the position of sports director from Christian Ziege, who became co-coach under Meyer. On 24 June 2010, he was promoted to the management board of Borussia Mönchengladbach GmbH as managing director of sports.

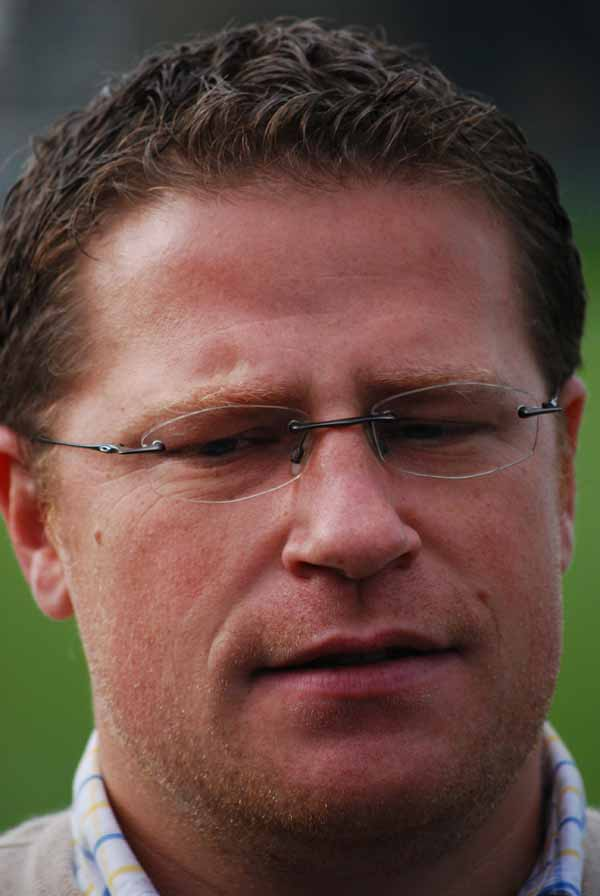
Eberl in 2008

Following the resignation of Hans Meyer, Eberl hired Michael Frontzeck for the 2009/10 season, whom he retained for a long time despite relegation worries in 2011. After two consecutive defeats against direct rivals (2–3 against VfB Stuttgart on matchday 21 and 1–3 at St. Pauli on matchday 22), Frontzeck was dismissed. One day later, Lucien Favre was appointed as the new coach. This initiated a race to catch up, which ended with 36 points and saw them reach the relegation spot. Borussia Mönchengladbach came out on top in the deciding matches against VfL Bochum.

This was followed by a very successful era for Borussia under coach Lucien Favre, in which they qualified for the Europa League twice and for the group stage of the Champions League for the first time in 2015. Nevertheless, Favre resigned on 20 September 2015 after six consecutive defeats in competitive matches at the start of the season, against the wishes of Eberl and the rest of the club management.

Eberl promoted André Schubert, the coach of the U-23s, to interim coach, who ended the season very successfully by qualifying for the Champions League once again. Despite this success and his permanent appointment as head coach in the winter, Schubert did not get off to a good start in the following season and Eberl dismissed him shortly before Christmas 2016.

Dieter Hecking was appointed as his successor and finished the season in ninth place. Borussia remained in this position after the following season. The 18/19 season was then more successful and ultimately ended in fifth place, qualifying for the Europa League. Although this success was on the cards, Eberl informed Hecking and the public at the beginning of April 2019 that the collaboration would not continue beyond the end of the season. Hecking was replaced by Marco Rose the following year.

The approach of replacing a successful coach with another who was expected to deliver even more was the subject of controversial public debate. Ultimately, Eberl was right in his decision, as Marco Rose finished his debut season in fourth place and thus qualified for the Champions League once again.

The period under Max Eberl is regarded as Borussia's most successful phase since the titles of the 1970s. Since Favre's appointment in particular, the club has finished every season in a single-digit position in the table, something only Bayern Munich and Borussia Dortmund had achieved in this period. They also reached the Europa League and the Champions League three times each in those nine years.

Eberl's tenure saw many notable transfers with Dante, Marco Reus, Granit Xhaka, Christoph Kramer, Max Kruse, Lars Stindl, Matthias Ginter and several others, as well as a number of successful players from the club's own youth ranks such as Tony Jantschke, Marc-André ter Stegen, Patrick Herrmann and Julian Korb.

Eberl's contract was extended in December 2020 until 30 June 2026. At the end of January 2022, he stepped down as managing director of sport due to "exhaustion". He was subsequently released before a contract termination was agreed in September 2022.

=== RB Leipzig ===
Eberl then became director of sport at RB Leipzig in December 2022. On 29 September 2023, RB Leipzig announced his immediate termination due to a perceived lack of commitment to the club.

=== Bayern Munich ===
In January 2024, it was reported that Eberl would sign a contract with Bayern Munich as director of sport. A month later, he officially signed a contract with Bayern Munich until June 2027 and commenced work on 1 March 2024.
