= Thomas Eichin =

German footballer

Personal information
- Date of birth: 9 October 1966 (age 60)
- Place of birth: Freiburg, West Germany
- Height: 1.77 m (5 ft 10 in)
- Position: Defender

Youth career
- Eintracht Freiburg

Senior career*
| Years | Team | Apps | (Gls) |
| –1985 | Freiburger FC | | |
| 1985–1994 | Borussia Mönchengladbach | 167 | (0) |
| 1995 | → 1. FC Nürnberg (loan) | 10 | (1) |
| 1995–1999 | Borussia Mönchengladbach | 13 | (0) |
- * Club domestic league appearances and goals

Thomas Eichin (born 9 October 1966) is a retired German football player. He was the general manager of the German DEL ice hockey club Kölner Haie. On 15 February 2013, he took over the job as general manager of Werder Bremen. After being laid off in May 2016, he took over the job as the sports director of 1860 Munich.

== Honours ==
- DFB-Pokal finalist: 1991–92
