= Steffen Karl =

German footballer

- Karl with Hallescher FC in 1988

Personal information
- Date of birth: 3 February 1970 (age 56)
- Place of birth: Hohenmölsen, East Germany
- Height: 1.82 m (6 ft 0 in)
- Position: Defensive midfielder

Youth career
- Medizin Halle-Nietleben
- Empor Halle
- 1982–1987: Chemie Halle

Senior career*
Years	Team	Apps	(Gls)
1987–1989	Chemie Halle	31	(2)
1989–1990	Stahl Hettstedt		
1990–1994	Borussia Dortmund	72	(2)
1994	→ Manchester City (loan)	6	(1)
1994–1995	Sion	24	(5)
1995–1998	Hertha BSC	90	(2)
1998–2000	FC St. Pauli	31	(0)
2000–2001	Vålerenga	10	(2)
2001–2003	Lokomotiv Sofia	16	(1)
2003–2005	Chemnitzer FC	51	(2)

International career
1991	Germany U21	1	(0)
- * Club domestic league appearances and goals

Steffen Karl (born 3 February 1970) is a German former professional footballer who played as a defensive midfielder.

== Football career ==
Born in Hohenmölsen, Saxony-Anhalt, Karl started his professional career in East Germany, representing Chemie Halle and modest BSG Stahl Hettstedt. In January 1990, he moved to the Bundesliga with Borussia Dortmund, making his competition debut on 30 March, playing eight minutes in a 2–0 home win against SV Waldhof Mannheim.

Almost always a backup at Borussia during his four half-year spell (his best output consisted in 28 games in the 1991–92 season), Karl left the club in the 1994 summer, before the club's back-to-back league conquests; following a run-in with coach Ottmar Hitzfeld, before this definitive release, he also played five months with Manchester City, on loan.

Karl played one year in Switzerland with FC Sion before returning to his country and representing Hertha BSC and FC St. Pauli in the 2. Bundesliga. In his second season at the former, he played 30 matches en route to promotion but never played again in his country's top division. In the following three years, he moved abroad again, playing for Vålerenga Fotball (one year) and PFC Lokomotiv Sofia (two). He became the first German to appear in the A PFG.

In 2003, 33-year-old Karl returned to Germany, playing with former East German sides. Two years later, while at Chemnitzer FC – he also represented VfB Fortuna Chemnitz until his final retirement in 2008 – he became the first player to be arrested in connection with Germany's match-fixing scandal, being suspected of helping manipulate the results of a May 2004 match between Chemnitz and SC Paderborn 07. He was given a nine-month suspended prison sentence for his role in the affair, and banned for eight months by the German Football Association.
