= Erich Ribbeck =

German football player and coach

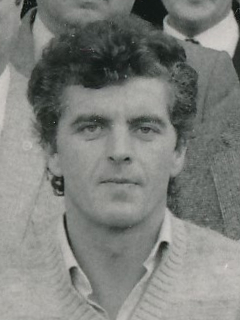
- Ribbeck around 1980

Personal information
- Date of birth: 13 June 1937 (age 89)
- Place of birth: Wuppertal, Nazi Germany
- Height: 1.84 m (6 ft 0 in)
- Position: Defender

Youth career
- SSV 1904 Wuppertal

Senior career*
Years	Team	Apps	(Gls)
1959–1962	SSV 1904 Wuppertal		
1962–1965	Viktoria Köln		

Managerial career
- 1967–1968: Rot-Weiss Essen
- 1968–1973: Eintracht Frankfurt
- 1973–1978: 1. FC Kaiserslautern
- 1984–1985: Borussia Dortmund
- 1985–1988: Bayer Leverkusen
- 1992–1993: Bayern Munich
- 1995–1996: Bayer Leverkusen
- 1998–2000: Germany
- * Club domestic league appearances and goals

Erich Ribbeck (born 13 June 1937) is a German former professional football player and manager, best known for coaching in the Bundesliga. In 1988, he won the UEFA Cup as manager of Bayer Leverkusen, the first title in the club's history.

== Playing career ==
As a player, Ribbeck had a career spanning most of the 1950s into the early 1960s with SSV 1904 Wuppertal, which has since merged with TSG Vohwinkel to form Wuppertaler SV. He later spent the rest of his career playing for Viktoria Köln. The highest level Ribbeck played was the Oberliga, part of the first tier of Germany which was then split into five regional divisions.

Ribbeck nearly joined Bayer 04 Leverkusen and Bundesliga side Hertha BSC in 1965, but both deals fell through. He then retired from playing and joined Borussia Mönchengladbach as assistant to Hennes Weisweiler.

== Managerial career ==
=== Club ===
Ribbeck's first coaching position he held at the age of 30 in 1967–68, when he took Rot-Weiss Essen to the second place in the western division of Germany's Level 2 league and thus to the promotion tournament, where the club ended up losing out against Hertha Berlin.

The next ten years he shared evenly with engagements with Eintracht Frankfurt and 1. FC Kaiserslautern. In the Bundesliga these clubs remained on mediocre levels during his tenure. With Kaiserslautern he reached the German Cup final of 1976, losing 0–2 to Hamburger SV.

After working as assistant to Jupp Derwall with the Germany national football team, Ribbeck was appointed Bayer Leverkusen coach in 1985. The club qualified for European competition for the first time in their history in his first season. In 1988, Leverkusen and Ribbeck won their first ever major trophy, lifting the UEFA Cup. Leverkusen beat Austria Wien, Toulouse, Feyenoord, Barcelona and Werder Bremen to reach the two-legged final against RCD Espanyol. Despite losing 3-0 away, Leverkusen won the second leg at home 3-0 with three second-half goals and won the eventual penalty shoot-out.

Ribbeck joined FC Bayern Munich in March 1992, replacing Søren Lerby, as the team unexpectedly found themselves fighting relegation. Ribbeck guided Bayern to 10th place, which was still their worst league finish since 1978. The following season, Ribbeck's Bayern challenged for the title; going into the final day, they were level on points with Werder Bremen but behind by a single goal. Bayern drew 3-3 with Schalke and finished 2nd.

Ribbeck was fired from Bayern in late 1993 after criticism from players and Uli Hoeneß, despite being just one point off the top of the Bundesliga. Franz Beckenbauer would replace Ribbeck and ultimately won the league.

Ribbeck returned to Leverkusen in 1995 but lasted just a year.

=== International ===
Ribbeck was originally considered as a candidate for the national team manager role after the resignation of Helmut Schön in 1978. Instead, Jupp Derwall was selected and it was not until 20 years later on 9 September 1998 that Ribbeck emerged from retirement to take over the Germany national team when other candidates had declined. At 61, he was the oldest appointee to the job.

Ribbeck's two-year tenure marked the worst period in the modern history of Germany's national side. Ribbeck resigned on 21 June 2000 after a string of disappointing results culminating in a group stage exit from Euro 2000. During that tournament, Ribbeck had rejected calls from Oliver Bierhoff, Oliver Kahn, Jens Nowotny and Mehmet Scholl to drop aging sweeper Lothar Matthäus. Ribbeck had insisted that Matthäus would earn his 150th cap, while threatening any rebellious national team members with a fine or exclusion from the squad.

His results as Germany's coach were ten wins, six draws and eight losses, the worst managerial performance of all time for a coach of the Germany national team. He was the first coach since Otto Nerz over 60 years earlier that failed to bring a major tournament win for Germany.

== Personal life ==
Ribbeck shares his residence between Pulheim and Tenerife, Spain.

== Managerial statistics ==
As of 22 January 2014

Team	From	To	Record					
Team	From	To	G	W	D	L	Win %	Ref.
Rot-Weiss Essen	1 July 1967	30 June 1968	42	25	11	6	59.52	
Eintracht Frankfurt	1 July 1968	30 June 1973	203	83	41	79	40.89	
1. FC Kaiserslautern	1 July 1973	30 June 1978	192	85	32	75	44.27	
Borussia Dortmund	28 October 1984	30 June 1985	25	10	4	11	40.00	
Bayer Leverkusen	1 July 1985	30 June 1988	125	53	36	36	42.40	
Bayern Munich	12 March 1992	27 December 1993	75	37	22	16	49.33	
Bayer Leverkusen	10 April 1995	28 April 1996	48	17	18	13	35.42	
Germany	9 September 1998	21 June 2000	24	10	6	8	41.67	
Total			734	320	170	244	43.60	—

== Honours ==
=== Manager ===
Bayer Leverkusen

- UEFA Cup: 1987–88

== See also ==
- List of UEFA Cup and Europa League winning managers
