= Manfred Schwabl =

German footballer

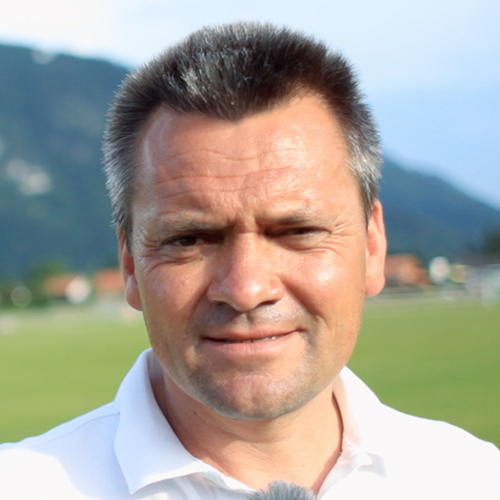
- Schwabl in 2013

Personal information
- Date of birth: 18 April 1966 (age 60)
- Place of birth: Holzkirchen, Germany
- Height: 1.70 m (5 ft 7 in)
- Position: Midfielder

Youth career
- –1977: FC Holzkirchen
- 1977–1985: Bayern Munich

Senior career*
Years	Team	Apps	(Gls)
1984–1986	Bayern Munich (A)		
1985–1986	Bayern Munich	7	(0)
1986–1989	1. FC Nürnberg	88	(8)
1989–1993	Bayern Munich	80	(4)
1993–1994	1. FC Nürnberg	45	(1)
1994	Swarovski Tirol	7	(0)
1994–1997	1860 Munich	83	(1)
Total		310	(14)

International career
1985–1987	West Germany U-21	13	(1)
1987–1988	West Germany	4	(0)
- * Club domestic league appearances and goals

Manfred Schwabl (born 18 April 1966) is a German former professional footballer who played as a midfielder. He made four appearances for West Germany.

== Club career ==
Schwabl, commonly nicknamed "Manni", was born in Holzkirchen. He appeared in more than 300 (West) German top-flight matches.

== International career ==
Schwabl won four caps for West Germany in the late 1980s.

== Honours ==
- Bundesliga: 1986, 1990
- DFB-Pokal: 1986; finalist 1985
