= Alois Reinhardt =

German footballer (born 1961)

Personal information
- Date of birth: 18 November 1961 (age 64)
- Place of birth: Höchstadt, West Germany
- Height: 1.79 m (5 ft 10 in)
- Position: Defender

Youth career
- 1968–1978: TSV Höchstadt
- 1978–1979: 1. FC Nürnberg

Senior career*
Years	Team	Apps	(Gls)
1979–1984	1. FC Nürnberg	102	(7)
1984–1991	Bayer Leverkusen	156	(1)
1992–1993	Bayern Munich	10	(1)
Total		268	(9)

International career
1982–1989	West Germany U21	14	(0)
1987–1988	West Germany Olympic	6	(0)
1989–1990	West Germany	4	(0)

Managerial career
- SpVgg Jahn Forchheim
- 2003–2005: 1. FC Nürnberg II
- 2006: 1. FC Kaiserslautern II
- 2007–2008: 1. FC Nürnberg (youth team)
- * Club domestic league appearances and goals

Alois Reinhardt (born 18 November 1961) is a German football coach and a former player who played as a defender.

== Club career ==
Reinhardt was born in Höchstadt. He played more than 250 matches in the (West) German top-flight.

== International career ==
Reinhardt won four caps for the West Germany national team in 1989 and 1990.

== Personal life ==
His son Dominik Reinhardt is also a professional footballer.

== Honours ==
- UEFA Cup: 1987–88
- DFB-Pokal: runner-up 1981–82
- Bundesliga runner-up: 1992–93
