= Jörg Bach =

German footballer

Personal information
- Date of birth: 20 November 1965 (age 60)
- Place of birth: Koblenz, West Germany
- Height: 1.91 m (6 ft 3 in)
- Position: Centre-back

Youth career
- BSV Weißenthurm
- SV Wirges

Senior career*
Years	Team	Apps	(Gls)
1985–1994	SG Wattenscheid 09	163	(15)
1994–1995	Hamburger SV	28	(0)
1995–1999	Fortuna Düsseldorf	89	(5)
1999–2000	Eintracht Trier	4	(0)
Total		284	(20)

Managerial career
- 2000–2002: TuS Montabaur
- 2002–2008: TSV Emmelshausen
- 2008–2011: SG Zell Bullay/Alf
- 2012–2014: SV Binnigen
- 2015: SpVgg EGC Wirges
- 2015–2016: SG Vordereifel
- * Club domestic league appearances and goals

Jörg Bach (born 20 November 1965) is a German former professional footballer who played as a centre-back and a former manager.
