= Oliver Kreuzer =

German footballer (born 1965)

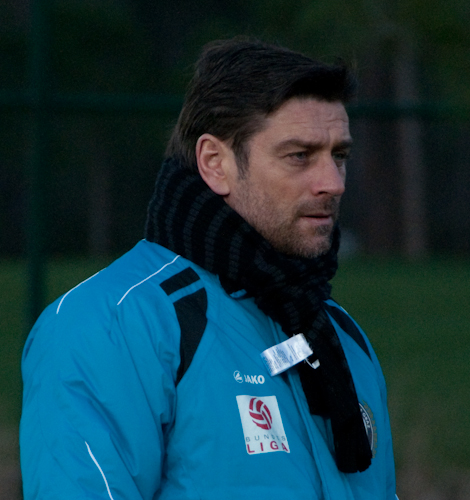
- Kreuzer with Sturm Graz in 2010.

Personal information
- Date of birth: 13 November 1965 (age 60)
- Place of birth: Mannheim, West Germany
- Height: 1.80 m (5 ft 11 in)
- Position: Central defender

Youth career
- –1985: SpVgg Ketsch

Senior career*
Years	Team	Apps	(Gls)
1985–1991	Karlsruher SC	182	(8)
1991–1997	Bayern Munich	150	(8)
1997–2002	FC Basel	136	(21)
Total		468	(37)

International career
1982	West Germany U16	2	(0)
1982–1984	West Germany U18	4	(1)
1986–1989	West Germany U21	7	(0)
1988	West Germany Olympic	1	(0)
Medal record
Bayern Munich
Winner	Bundesliga	1994
Runner-up	DFB-Supercup	1994
Winner	UEFA Cup	1996
Winner	Bundesliga	1997
FC Basel
Winner	Swiss Super League	2002
Winner	Schweizer Cup	2002
- * Club domestic league appearances and goals

Oliver Kreuzer (born 13 November 1965) is a German former professional footballer who played as a centre-back for Karlsruher SC, Bayern Munich and FC Basel.

== Football career ==
Kreuzer started his career in 1985 with Karlsruher SC. He went on to make over 150 appearances for the club became something of a cult hero. In 1991, he signed for Bundesliga club FC Bayern Munich where he won the League Title in 1994 and 1997 and the UEFA Cup in 1996. He played six years in Munich,

Kreuzer joined Basel's first team for their 1997–98 season under head coach Jörg Berger. After playing in five test games Kreuzer played his domestic league debut for his new club in the away game in the Olympique de la Pontaise on 9 July 1997 as Basel were defeated 0–3 by Lausanne-Sport. He scored his first goal for his club on 19 October in the home game in the St. Jakob Stadium against Zürich as the two teams drew 3–3.

At the end of the FC Basel 2001–02 season, Kreuzer retired from his active football career at the age of 36. Basel won the domestic double, League champions and Swiss Cup winners, in this season. Between the years 1997 and 2002 Kreuzer played a total of 212 games for Basel scoring a total of 32 goals. 136 of these games were in the Nationalliga A, 9 in the Swiss Cup, 17 were in UEFA competitions (UEFA Cup and UIC) and 50 were friendly games. He scored 21 goals in the domestic league, 1 in the Cup, 3 in the European competitions and the other seven were scored during the test games.

== Honours ==
Bayern Munich

- Bundesliga: 1993–94, 1996–97
- UEFA Cup: 1995–96

Basel

- Nationalliga A: 2001–02
- Swiss Cup: 2001–02

== Sources ==
- Die ersten 125 Jahre / 2018. Publisher: Josef Zindel im Friedrich Reinhardt Verlag, Basel. ISBN 978-3-7245-2305-5
- Switzerland 2001–02 at RSSSF
