= Markus Münch (footballer) =

German footballer

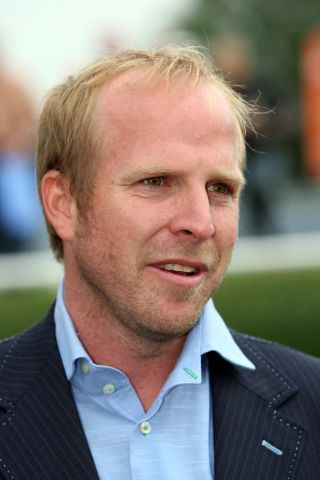
- Münch in 2023

Personal information
- Full name: Markus Armin Münch
- Date of birth: 7 September 1972 (age 54)
- Place of birth: Nußloch, West Germany
- Height: 1.71 m (5 ft 7 in)
- Positions: Left-back; left midfielder

Youth career
- SV Sandhausen
- –1990: Bayern Munich

Senior career*
Years	Team	Apps	(Gls)
1990–1994	Bayern Munich	38	(0)
1994–1996	Bayer Leverkusen	57	(3)
1996–1998	Bayern Munich	11	(0)
1998	1. FC Köln	13	(2)
1998–1999	Genoa	32	(2)
1999–2001	Beşiktaş	60	(6)
2001–2003	Borussia Mönchengladbach	45	(7)
2003–2005	Panathinaikos	44	(3)
Total		300	(23)

International career
1987–1988	Germany U-15	4	(0)
1988–1989	Germany U-16	8	(0)
1989–1990	Germany U-17	5	(0)
1990–1991	Germany U-18	2	(0)
1991–1993	Germany U-21	14	(2)
- * Club domestic league appearances and goals

Markus Münch (born 7 September 1972) is a German former footballer who played as a left-back or left midfielder. His professional career was mainly associated with Bayern Munich, Bayer Leverkusen, Borussia Mönchengladbach, Besiktas Istanbul and Panathinaikos. He is currently a racehorse trainer, owner and breeder based in Chantilly, France.

== Career ==
Born in Nußloch, West Germany, Münch played as a youth for SV Sandhausen, before joining Bayern Munich as a 17-year-old in 1990. He made his debut for the club in March 1991, as a substitute for Christian Ziege in a European Cup match against FC Porto, and added two Bundesliga appearances under Jupp Heynckes before the end of the season as Bayern finished in second place.

Münch began to establish himself in the first team the following season – his first appearance came in October, after replacing Hans Pflügler in a 3–0 defeat against Borussia Dortmund. Eleven days later he scored his first goal, the second in the 90th minute in a 6–2 UEFA Cup loss against Danish B 1903. He played regularly during the second half of the season, finishing on fifteen league appearances in what was a disappointing season for Bayern – they finished in 10th place.

Over the next two seasons Münch made a similar number of appearances, helping Bayern to a Bundesliga title in 1993–94, before leaving at the end of the season in search of first-team football, signing for Bayer Leverkusen.

Münch was a regular first-team player for Leverkusen in the next two years, making over 60 appearances helping them reach the UEFA Cup semi-final in 1994–95, but the following year they were involved in a relegation battle, and were only saved through a legendary goal by Münch on the last day of the season, despite playing with a groin injury and already having planned a surgery weeks before. His 81st-minute equaliser in a 1–1 draw with 1. FC Kaiserslautern condemned Lautern to the drop instead. To this day, this goal is widely been acknowledged as one of the morst important goals in Bundesliga history.

In July 1996, Münch returned to Bayern Munich but the second spell at Bayern turned out to be similar to his first – he made eleven league appearances in 1996–97, winning a second Bundesliga title, but did not play at the beginning of the first half of the 1997–98 season, and left Bayern for a second time in January 1998, signing for relegation-threatened 1. FC Köln.

He made 13 appearances for Köln, scoring twice, but they were unable to avoid the drop, finishing 17th, and he left the club, signing for Genoa of Italy's Serie B. Genoa finished in 12th place in the 1998–99 season, and in summer 1999 Münch was on the move again, moving to Turkish club Beşiktaş, who were coached by former West Germany international Hans-Peter Briegel.

Münch spent two very successful years with Beşiktaş, scoring 6 goals and 22 assists while winning the Atatürk-Cup and finishing second and then fourth in the league, before returning to Germany to sign for Borussia Mönchengladbach, who had just been promoted back to the Bundesliga. He helped Gladbach establish themselves back at this level, finishing 12th in both of the next two seasons, before moving abroad again in 2003, to sign for Panathinaikos in Greece.

Münch's first season with Panathinaikos was hugely successful – they won the League and Cup, played in the group stage of the UEFA Cup and qualified for the UEFA Champions League. Münch was voted as the League's best foreign player. He retired from football at the end of the following season, after a second place league finish.

== Racehorse trainer ==
Münch became interested in horse racing when taking a half-share in the horse Basimah while still under contract with Borussia Mönchengladbach. After his retirement as a professional football player he decided to pursue a career in thoroughbred horseracing as a trainer, owner and breeder in 2010. He currently trains around 30 racehorses at Chantilly, France and was previously based in Mannheim and Frankfurt, Germany where he had some successful years early in his career, despite only starting with a small amount of horses, including the filly Intarsia, who won Münch's first „Listed race“ in 2010.

In 2016, following his move from Frankfurt to Chantilly, he had huge success training the self-bred three-year-old filly Spectre to win the Group Three Prix Imprudence at Maisons-Laffitte. She was ridden by French jockey Pierre-Charles Boudot, who was Spectre's rider for most races. This was Münch's first Group Race win in his trainer career. Spectre went on to make her Group One debut in the Poule D‘Essai des Pouliches at Deauville where she finished fifth only being beaten by 1 1/2 lengths to La Cressonniere. Spectre's three-year-old campaign was highly successful, as she finished third in the Prix Jean Prat and fourth in the Prix Jacques Le Marois, where she was only beaten by a nose to the high class filly Ervedya at third place but with Esoterique, Lightning Spear and Galileo Gold among the beaten horses. Spectre's best career performance came in early September, where she finished as a runner-up to Vadamos in the Group One Prix Du Moulin, while beating some high-class colts such as Zelzal and Zarak.

In early November, Spectre and Münch travelled to the Breeders Cup World Championships in Santa Anita, California to perform in the Breeders Cup Mile where she raced against the world's best racehorses over the distance of a mile or 8 furlongs. She was retired to stud after an impressive fourth place to Ribchester in the Group 1 Queen Anne Stakes at Royal Ascot in 2017.

Münch's successful stakes performers include: Intarsia (2010), Spectre (2016,2017) Reshabar (2021,2022) and Odemar (2026).

During the early years of his career in horse racing, Münch was also associated with the german Preis der Diana winner Feodora (2014) and the Deutsches Derby runner up Palace Prince (2015) when operating as a trainer/manager in Frankfurt, Germany.

== Honours ==
Bayern Munich

- Bundesliga: 1993–94, 1996–97
- Bundesliga Runner-up: 1990-91, 1992-93
- DFB-Ligapokal: 1997

Panathinaikos

- Alpha Ethniki: 2003–04
- Greek Cup: 2003–04

Besiktas Istanbul

- Atatürk Cup: 2000

Individual

- Super League Greece Best Foreign Player: 2004
- Kicker Bundesliga Team of the Season: 2002-2003

Horse Racing

- Prix Imprudence (Group 3): 2016
