= Michael Sternkopf =

Former German footballer

Personal information
- Date of birth: 21 April 1970 (age 56)
- Place of birth: Karlsruhe, West Germany
- Position: Winger

Youth career
- –1988: SV Nordwest Karlsruhe

Senior career*
Years	Team	Apps	(Gls)
1988–1990	Karlsruher SC	33	(4)
1990–1995	Bayern Munich	94	(4)
1995–1996	Borussia Mönchengladbach	34	(5)
1996–1997	SC Freiburg	16	(0)
1997–2003	Arminia Bielefeld	80	(3)
2004	Kickers Offenbach	1	(0)
Total		258	(16)

International career
1989–1990	West Germany U-21	8	(2)
1990	Germany Olympic	1	(0)
Medal record
Bayern Munich
Winner	DFB-Supercup	1990
Winner	Bundesliga	1994
Runner-up	DFB-Supercup	1994
Borussia Mönchengladbach
Runner-up	DFB-Supercup	1995
- * Club domestic league appearances and goals

Michael Sternkopf (born 21 April 1970 in Karlsruhe) is a German former professional footballer who played for Karlsruher SC, Bayern Munich, Borussia Mönchengladbach, SC Freiburg, Arminia Bielefeld and Kickers Offenbach, as well as for the Germany under-21 national team.

== Honours ==
Bayern Munich

- DFL-Supercup: 1990
- Bundesliga: 1993–94
