= 1987–88 FC Bayern Munich season =

88th season in existence of Bayern Munich

FC Bayern Munich
1987–88 season
- Manager: Jupp Heynckes
- Stadium: Olympiastadion
- Bundesliga: 2nd
- European Cup: Quarter-finals
- DFB-Pokal: Quarter-finals
- DFB-Supercup: Winners
- Top goalscorer: League: Lothar Matthäus (17); All: Lothar Matthäus (21)
Home colours	Away colours

The 1987–88 FC Bayern Munich season was the 88th season in the club's history and 23rd season since promotion from Regionalliga Süd in 1965. Bayern Munich finished as runner-up in the Bundesliga to SV Werder Bremen. The club reached the quarterfinals of both the DFB-Pokal and the European Cup. The inaugural DFB-Supercup was won by Bayern Munich over Hamburger SV. This season was the first season under manager Jupp Heynckes, who replaced Udo Lattek.

== Results ==
=== Friendlies ===
==== Fuji-Cup ====
Semifinals	1. FC Köln	1–2	Bayern Munich	Kaiserslautern

Final	Bayern Munich	5–1	Hamburger SV	Kaiserslautern

==== Joan Gamper Trophy ====
18 August 1987 Semifinals	Bayern Munich	1–1 (5–3 p)	AFC Ajax	Barcelona, Spain
	Wohlfarth 42'		Bosman 18'	Stadium: Camp Nou

19 August 1987 Final	F.C. Porto	2–0	Bayern Munich	Barcelona, Spain
	Semedo 49'; Madjer 89'			Stadium: Camp Nou

=== Bundesliga ===
1 August 1987 1	Borussia Dortmund	1–3	Bayern Munich	Dortmund
15:30 CEST	Mill 52'	Report	Rummenigge 35'; Wohlfarth 50'; Lunde 78'	Stadium: Westfalenstadion; Attendance: 50,000; Referee: Heinz Werner

8 August 1987 2	Bayern Munich	6–0	Hamburger SV	Munich
15:30 CEST	Matthäus 25', 87'; Wegmann 45', 84'; Rummenigge 54'; Wohlfarth 78'	Report		Stadium: Olympiastadion; Attendance: 63,000; Referee: Karl-Josef Assenmacher

15 August 1987 3	Bayern Munich	2–1	SV Waldhof Mannheim	Munich
15:30 CEST	Wegmann 10'; Wohlfarth 25'	Report	Trieb 69'	Stadium: Olympiastadion; Attendance: 25,000; Referee: Hans-Jürgen Weber

22 August 1987 4	FC 08 Homburg	3–2	Bayern Munich	Homburg
15:30 CEST	Freiler 30'; Schäfer 67', 77'	Report	Matthäus 49'; Wegmann 87'	Stadium: Waldstadion Homburg; Attendance: 20,000; Referee: Bernd Kruse

26 August 1987 5	Bayern Munich	1–0	1. FC Nürnberg	Munich
20:00 CEST	Pflügler 31'	Report		Stadium: Olympiastadion; Attendance: 77,573; Referee: Joachim Kautschor

2 September 1987 6	Borussia Mönchengladbach	2–0	Bayern Munich	Mönchengladbach
20:00 CEST	Rahn 37', 45' (pen.)	Report		Stadium: Bökelbergstadion; Attendance: 34,500; Referee: Hans-Peter Dellwing

5 September 1987 7	Bayern Munich	3–2	Eintracht Frankfurt	Munich
15:30 CEST	Nachtwieh 44'; Augenthaler 54'; Wohlfarth 62'	Report	Smolarek 2'; Schulz 37'	Stadium: Olympiastadion; Attendance: 19,000; Referee: Manfred Neuner

12 September 1987 8	1. FC Köln	3–1	Bayern Munich	Cologne
15:30 CEST	Allofs 16'; Engels 27'; Povlsen 45'	Report	Brehme 13'	Stadium: Müngersdorfer Stadion; Attendance: 56,000; Referee: Wolf-Günter Wiesel

19 September 1987 9	Bayern Munich	2–1	SV Werder Bremen	Munich
15:30 CEST	Pflügler 75'; Rummenigge 82'	Report	Meier 88'	Stadium: Olympiastadion; Attendance: 62,000; Referee: Peter Gabor

26 September 1987 10	FC Schalke 04	1–4	Bayern Munich	Gelsenkirchen
15:30 CEST	Götz 87'	Report	Pflügler 9'; Rummenigge 20', 79'; Kögl 25'	Stadium: Parkstadion; Attendance: 61,200; Referee: Hans-Joachim Osmers

3 October 1987 11	Bayern Munich	4–1	Hannover 96	Munich
15:30 CET	Wohlfarth 13', 42'; Nachtweih 26'; Brehme 75'	Report	Reich 64'	Stadium: Olympiastadion; Attendance: 40,000; Referee: Peter Richmann

10 October 1987 12	Karlsruher SC	0–1	Bayern Munich	Karlsruhe
15:30 CEST		Report	Rummenigge 64'	Stadium: Wildparkstadion; Attendance: 45,000; Referee: Wolf-Dieter Ahlenfelder

17 October 1987 13	Bayern Munich	4–2	1. FC Kaiserslautern	Munich
15:30 CET	Wegmann 7', 36'; Wohlfarth 14'; Dorfner 30'	Report	Kohr 35', 52'	Stadium: Olympiastadion; Attendance: 24,000; Referee: Klaus Broska

31 October 1987 14	VfL Bochum	0–2	Bayern Munich	Bochum
15:30 CET		Report	Flick 69'; Wegmann 89'	Stadium: Ruhrstadion; Attendance: 35,000; Referee: Ralf Blattmann

7 November 1987 15	Bayern Munich	3–0	Bayer 05 Uerdingen	Munich
15:30 CET	Hughes 30'; Matthäus 81'; Wegmann 87'	Report		Stadium: Olympiastadion; Attendance: 16,000; Referee: Wilfried Heitmann

14 November 1987 16	VfB Stuttgart	3–0	Bayern Munich	Stuttgart
15:30 CET	Jürgen Klinsmann 18'; Walter 71'; Hartmann 90'	Report		Stadium: Neckarstadion; Attendance: 70,705; Referee: Dieter Pauly

21 November 1987 17	Bayern Munich	3–2	Bayer Leverkusen	Munich
15:30 CET	Augenthaler 17'; Wohlfarth 41'; Rummenigge 69'	Report	Tita 79'; Rolff 90'	Stadium: Olympiastadion; Attendance: 13,000; Referee: Norbert Brückner

28 November 1987 18	Bayern Munich	1–3	Borussia Dortmund	Munich
15:30 CET	Augenthaler 45'	Report	Simmes 20', 88'; Anderbrügge 39'	Stadium: Olympiastadion; Attendance: 11,500; Referee: Wolfgang Mierswa

5 December 1987 19	Hamburger SV	2–2	Bayern Munich	Hamburg
15:30 CET	von Heesen 52'; Kroth 66'	Report	Augenthaler 23'; Matthäus 75'	Stadium: Volksparkstadion; Attendance: 36,400; Referee: Hans-Peter Dellwing

20 February 1988 20	SV Waldhof Mannheim	1–2	Bayern Munich	Ludwigshafen
15:30 CET	Bockenfeld 9'	Report	Pflügler 41'; Rummenigge 83'	Stadium: Südweststadion; Attendance: 23,000; Referee: Hellmut Krug

27 February 1988 21	Bayern Munich	6–0	FC 08 Homburg	Munich
15:30 CET	Wohlfarth 8', 77'; Brehme 54'; Matthäus 58' (pen.); Pflügler 72'; Rummenigge 79'	Report		Stadium: Olympiastadion; Attendance: 8,500; Referee: Wolf-Dieter Ahlenfelder

5 March 1988 22	1. FC Nürnberg	0–3	Bayern Munich	Nuremberg
15:30 CET		Report	Eck 9'; Hughes 45'; Matthäus 67'	Stadium: Frankenstadion; Attendance: 49,000; Referee: Karl-Josef Assenmacher

12 March 1988 23	Bayern Munich	1–0	Borussia Mönchengladbach	Munich
15:30 CET	Matthäus 79'	Report		Stadium: Olympiastadion; Attendance: 18,000; Referee: Manfred Neuner

19 March 1988 24	Eintracht Frankfurt	1–1	Bayern Munich	Frankfurt
15:30 CET	Turowski 71'	Report	Matthäus 73' (pen.)	Stadium: Waldstadion; Attendance: 51,000; Referee: Dieter Pauly

23 March 1988 25	Bayern Munich	2–2	1. FC Köln	Munich
20:00 CET	Dorfner 26'; Hughes 52'	Report	Geilenkirchen 58', 75'	Stadium: Olympiastadion; Attendance: 24,000; Referee: Gerhard Theobald

26 March 1988 26	SV Werder Bremen	3–1	Bayern Munich	Bremen
15:30 CET	Ordenewitz 26' (pen.); Riedle 40', 85'	Report	Matthäus 25' (pen.)	Stadium: Weserstadion; Attendance: 39,500; Referee: Joachim Kautschor

9 April 1988 27	Bayern Munich	8–1	FC Schalke 04	Munich
15:30 CEST	Matthäus 22' (pen.), 39' (pen.), 42'; Rummenigge 25'; Wegmann 31', 80'; Dorfner 79'; Augenthaler 90'	Report	Schipper 11'	Stadium: Olympiastadion; Attendance: 16,500; Referee: Herbert Eli

16 April 1988 28	Hannover 96	2–1	Bayern Munich	Hannover
15:30 CEST	Hobday 58'; Grillemeier 76'	Report	Pflügler 6'	Stadium: Niedersachsenstadion; Attendance: 60,354; Referee: Heinz Werner

23 April 1988 29	Bayern Munich	2–1	Karlsruher SC	Munich
15:30 CEST	Matthäus 24'; Wegmann 90+3' (pen.)	Report	Süss 23'	Stadium: Olympiastadion; Attendance: 15,000; Referee: Rainer Boos

30 April 1988 30	1. FC Kaiserslautern	3–1	Bayern Munich	Kaiserslautern
15:30 CEST	Lelle 44'; Kohr 55', 62'	Report	Wohlfarth 81'	Stadium: Fritz-Walter-Stadion; Attendance: 34,500; Referee: Hans-Jürgen Weber

3 May 1988 31	Bayern Munich	5–0	VfL Bochum	Munich
20:00 CEST	Hughes 51', 62', 68'; Eder 61'; Dorfner 83'	Report		Stadium: Olympiastadion; Attendance: 8,500; Referee: Hans-Heinrich Barnick

7 May 1988 32	Bayer 05 Uerdingen	0–0	Bayern Munich	Krefeld
15:30 CEST		Report		Stadium: Grotenburg-Stadion; Attendance: 18,000; Referee: Wolf-Günter Wiesel

14 May 1988 33	Bayern Munich	2–1	VfB Stuttgart	Munich
15:30 CEST	Matthäus 9', 49'	Report	Klinsmann 80'	Stadium: Olympiastadion; Attendance: 35,000; Referee: Norbert Brückner

21 May 1988 34	Bayer Leverkusen	3–4	Bayern Munich	Leverkusen
15:30 CEST	Hausmann 3'; Tita 8'; Götz 18'	Report	Matthäus 20'; Bayerschmidt 50'; Wegmann 72', 81'	Stadium: Ulrich-Haberland-Stadion; Attendance: 14,500; Referee: Wilfried Heitmann

==== Results by round ====
Round	1	2	3	4	5	6	7	8	9	10	11	12	13	14	15	16	17	18	19	20	21	22	23	24	25	26	27	28	29	30	31	32	33	34
Ground	A	H	H	A	H	A	H	A	H	A	A	A	H	A	H	A	H	H	A	A	H	A	H	A	H	A	H	A	H	A	H	A	H	A
Result	W	W	W	L	W	L	W	L	W	W	W	W	W	W	W	L	W	L	D	W	W	W	W	D	D	L	W	L	W	L	W	D	W	W
Position	2	1	1	2	1	4	4	5	4	4	4	3	3	3	2	2	2	3	3	2	2	2	2	2	2	2	2	2	2	3	2	2	2	2

A = Away; H = Home; W = Win; D = Draw; L = Loss

==== League standings ====
Pos	Team	Pld	W	D	L	GF	GA	GD	Pts	Qualification or relegation
1	Werder Bremen (C)	34	22	8	4	61	22	+39	52	Qualification to European Cup first round
2	Bayern Munich	34	22	4	8	83	45	+38	48	Qualification to UEFA Cup first round (Note: Bayer Leverkusen won the UEFA Cup and thereby automatically qualified as title holders.)
3	1. FC Köln	34	18	12	4	57	28	+29	48	Qualification to UEFA Cup first round
4	VfB Stuttgart	34	16	8	10	69	49	+20	40	Qualification to UEFA Cup first round
5	1. FC Nürnberg	34	13	11	10	44	40	+4	37	Qualification to UEFA Cup first round

Source: www.dfb.de
Rules for classification: 1) points; 2) goal difference; 3) number of goals scored.
(C) Champions

=== DFB Pokal ===
29 August 1987 1st Round	Rot-Weiss Essen	1–3	Bayern Munich	Essen
	Regenbogen 54'	Report	Wohlfarth 37', 54', 77'	Stadium: Stadion Essen; Attendance: 3,000; Referee: Hans-Heinrich Barnick

25 October 1987 2nd Round	Borussia Mönchengladbach	2–2 (a.e.t.)	Bayern Munich	Mönchengladbach
	Hochstätter 78'; Thiele 100'	Report	Rummenigge 72'; Dorfner 97'	Stadium: Bökelbergstadion; Attendance: 34,000; Referee: Gerhard Theobald

11 November 1987 2nd Round; Replay	Bayern Munich	3–2 (a.e.t.)	Borussia Mönchengladbach	Munich
	Matthäus 74'; Rummenigge 93', 111'	Report	Thiele 57'; Criens 110'	Stadium: Olympiastadion; Attendance: 42,000; Referee: Heinz Werner

14 February 1988 3rd Round	Bayern Munich	3–1	1. FC Nürnberg	Munich
	Nachtweih 20'; Hughes 62'; Matthäus 90' (pen.)	Report	Andersen 33'	Stadium: Olympiastadion; Attendance: 61,000; Referee: Wolf-Rüdiger Umbach

8 March 1988 Quarterfinals	Hamburger SV	2–1	Bayern Munich	Hamburg
	Kastl 6'; Gründel 45'	Report	Matthäus 59'	Stadium: Volksparkstadion; Attendance: 45,000; Referee: Werner Föckler

=== DFB-Supercup ===
28 July 1987	Bayern Munich	2–1	Hamburger SV	Frankfurt
	Wegmann 60', 87'		Okoński 39'	Stadium: Waldstadion; Attendance: 22,000

=== European Cup ===
==== 1st round ====
16 September 1987 1st leg	Bayern Munich (West Germany)	4–0	(Bulgaria) CSKA Sofia	Munich, West Germany
20:00 CEST	Wegmann 30', 64'; Dorfner 36'; Brehme 56'			Stadium: Olympiastadion; Attendance: 17,000; Referee: Emilio Soriano Aladrén (Spain)

30 September 1987 2nd leg	CSKA Sofia (Bulgaria)	0–1 (0–5 agg.)	(West Germany) Bayern Munich	Sofia, Bulgaria
18:00 CET			Kögl 70'	Stadium: Vasil Levski National Stadium; Attendance: 10,000; Referee: Keith Hackett (England)

==== 2nd round ====
21 October 1987 1st leg	Neuchâtel Xamax (Switzerland)	2–1	(West Germany) Bayern Munich	Neuchâtel, Switzerland
20:30 CET	Lüthi 28'; Sutter 51'		Matthäus 47'	Stadium: Stade de la Maladière; Attendance: 22,000; Referee: Egbert Mulder (Netherlands)

4 November 1987 2nd leg	Bayern Munich (West Germany)	2–0 (3–2 agg.)	(Switzerland) Neuchâtel Xamax	Munich, West Germany
20:00 CET	Pflügler 87'; Wegmann 90'			Stadium: Olympiastadion; Attendance: 28,000; Referee: Valerii Butenko (Russia)

==== Quarterfinals ====
2 March 1988 1st leg	Bayern Munich (West Germany)	3–2	(Spain) Real Madrid	Munich, West Germany
20:15 CET	Pflügler 39'; Eder 45'; Wohlfarth 47'		Butragueño 85'; Sánchez 90'	Stadium: Olympiastadion; Attendance: 70,000; Referee: Paolo Casarin (Italy)

16 March 1988 2nd leg	Real Madrid (Spain)	2–0 (4–3 agg.)	(West Germany) Bayern Munich	Madrid, Spain
21:00 CET	Janković 25'; Míchel 41'			Stadium: Santiago Bernabéu Stadium; Attendance: 100,000; Referee: Alexis Ponnet (Belgium)

== Team statistics ==
Competition	First match	Last match	Starting round	Final position	Record							
Competition	First match	Last match	Starting round	Final position	G	W	D	L	GF	GA	GD	Win %
Bundesliga	1 August 1987	21 May 1988	Matchday 1	Runner-up	34	22	4	8	83	45	+38	64.71
DFB-Pokal	29 August 1987	8 March 1988	First round	Quarterfinals	5	3	1	1	12	8	+4	60.00
DFB-Supercup	28 July 1987		Final	Winner	1	1	0	0	2	1	+1	100.00
European Cup	16 September 1987	16 Marcy 1988	First round	Quarterfinals	6	4	0	2	11	6	+5	66.67
Total					46	30	5	11	108	60	+48	65.22

== Players ==
=== Squad, appearances and goals ===
No.	Pos	Nat	Player	Total		Bundesliga		DFB-Pokal		European Cup	
No.	Pos	Nat	Player	Apps	Goals	Apps	Goals	Apps	Goals	Apps	Goals
	GK	(Belgium) BEL	Jean-Marie Pfaff	35	0	25+0	0	5+0	0	5+0	0
	GK	(West Germany) FRG	Raimond Aumann	10	0	9+0	0	0+0	0	1+0	0
	DF	(West Germany) FRG	Norbert Eder	43	2	32+0	1	5+0	0	6+0	1
	DF	(West Germany) FRG	Hans Pflügler	40	8	29+0	6	5+0	0	6+0	2
	DF	(West Germany) FRG	Andreas Brehme	38	4	27+1	3	3+1	0	6+0	1
	DF	(West Germany) FRG	Klaus Augenthaler (captain)	31	5	23+1	5	3+1	0	2+1	0
	DF	(West Germany) FRG	Uli Bayerschmidt	3	1	2+1	1	0+0	0	0+0	0
	MF	(East Germany) GDR	Norbert Nachtweih	40	3	30+0	2	5+0	1	5+0	0
	MF	(West Germany) FRG	Hansi Flick	38	1	20+7	1	5+0	0	6+0	0
	MF	(West Germany) FRG	Hans Dorfner	35	6	29+0	4	2+0	1	4+0	1
	MF	(West Germany) FRG	Lothar Matthäus	34	21	26+0	17	4+0	3	4+0	1
	MF	(West Germany) FRG	Armin Eck	23	1	12+6	1	2+1	0	0+2	0
	MF	(West Germany) FRG	Helmut Winklhofer	23	0	12+5	0	2+1	0	2+1	0
	FW	(West Germany) FRG	Michael Rummenigge	40	13	26+6	10	1+2	3	4+1	0
	FW	(West Germany) FRG	Roland Wohlfarth	39	14	27+2	10	5+0	3	5+0	1
	FW	(West Germany) FRG	Ludwig Kögl	32	2	10+12	1	4+0	0	5+1	1
	FW	(West Germany) FRG	Jürgen Wegmann	31	16	17+10	13	2+0	0	2+0	3
	FW	(Wales) WAL	Mark Hughes	23	7	17+1	6	2+1	1	2+0	0
	FW	(Denmark) DEN	Lars Lunde	13	1	2+7	1	0+1	0	0+3	0
Players sold or loaned out after the start of the season:
	FW	(West Germany) FRG	Uwe Tschiskale	2	0	0+1	0	0+0	0	1+0	0

=== Bookings ===
No.	Player	Bundesliga			DFB-Pokal			European Cup			Total		
No.	Player	Booked	(yellow card) (red card)	Sent off (straight red)	Booked	(yellow card) (red card)	Sent off (straight red)	Booked	(yellow card) (red card)	Sent off (straight red)	Booked	(yellow card) (red card)	Sent off (straight red)
	Mark Hughes	6	0	1	1	0	0	0	0	0	7	0	1
	Andreas Brehme	6	0	0	0	0	0	0	0	0	6	0	0
	Hansi Flick	4	0	0	1	0	0	1	0	0	6	0	0
	Lothar Matthäus	3	0	0	1	0	0	2	0	0	6	0	0
	Hans Pflügler	3	0	0	0	0	0	2	0	0	5	0	0
	Klaus Augenthaler	2	0	1	2	0	0	0	0	0	4	0	1
	Norbert Nachtweih	3	0	0	1	0	0	0	0	0	4	0	0
	Hans Dorfner	2	0	0	0	0	0	1	0	0	3	0	0
	Norbert Eder	1	0	0	0	0	0	1	0	0	2	0	0
	Jean-Marie Pfaff	1	0	0	0	0	0	1	0	0	2	0	0
	Michael Rummenigge	2	0	0	0	0	0	0	0	0	2	0	0
	Roland Wohlfarth	1	0	0	0	0	0	1	0	0	2	0	0
	Ludwig Kögl	0	0	0	1	0	0	0	0	0	1	0	0
	Uwe Tschiskale	1	0	0	0	0	0	0	0	0	1	0	0
	Helmut Winklhofer	1	0	0	0	0	0	0	0	0	1	0	0
Totals		36	0	2	7	0	0	9	0	0	52	0	2

== Transfers ==
=== In ===
No.	Pos.	Nat.	Name	Age	EU	Moving from	Type	Transfer window	Ends	Transfer fee	Source
	FW	(West Germany)	Jürgen Wegmann	23	EU	Schalke 04	Transfer	Summer		€550,000	
	MF	(West Germany)	Armin Eck	22	EU	SpVgg Bayreuth	Transfer	Summer		€40,000	
	FW	(Wales)	Mark Hughes	23	EU	Barcelona (Spain)	Loan	Summer			
	FW	(West Germany)	Uwe Tschiskale	24	EU	SG Wattenscheid 09	Transfer	Summer		Undisclosed	

=== Out ===
No.	Pos.	Nat.	Name	Age	EU	Moving to	Type	Transfer window	Transfer fee	Source
	GK	(Belgium)	Robert Dekeyser	22	EU	1. FC Nürnberg	Transfer	Summer	Free	
	MF	(West Germany)	Holger Willmer	28	EU	Hannover 96	Transfer	Summer	Undisclosed	
	FW	(West Germany)	Reinhold Mathy	25	EU	KFC Uerdingen	Transfer	Summer	Undisclosed	
	FW	(West Germany)	Dieter Hoeneß	34	EU		End of career	Summer	N/A	
	FW	(West Germany)	Uwe Tschiskale	25	EU	Schalke 04	Transfer	Winter	Undisclosed	
