= 1989–90 FC Bayern Munich season =

90th season in existence of Bayern Munich

FC Bayern Munich
1989–90 season
- Manager: Jupp Heynckes
- Stadium: Olympiastadion
- Bundesliga: 1st
- DFB-Pokal: Third round
- DFB-Supercup: Runners-up
- European Cup: Semi-finals
- Top goalscorer: League: Roland Wohlfarth (13); All: Roland Wohlfarth (14)

The 1989–90 FC Bayern Munich season was the 90th season in the club's history and 25th season since promotion from Regionalliga Süd in 1965. Bayern won its 11th Bundesliga title. The club also reached the third round of the DFB-Pokal and the semifinals of the European Cup. Bayern finished as runner-up in the DFB-Supercup losing to Borussia Dortmund.

== Results ==
=== Friendlies ===
==== Fuji-Cup ====
18 July 1989 Semifinals	VfB Stuttgart	1–1 (4–3 p)	Bayern Munich	Würzburg

20 July 1989 Third place	Bayern Munich	2–0	1. FC Köln	Würzburg

==== Teresa Herrera Trophy ====
12 August 1989 Semifinals	Bayern Munich	3–1	PSV Eindhoven	A Coruña, Spain
	Wohlfarth 5'; Thon 22'; McInally 32'		Kieft ?' (pen.)	Stadium: Estadio Riazor

13 August 1989 Final	Bayern Munich	4–1	FC Steaua București	A Coruña, Spain
	Kohler 7'; Kastenmaier 44'; Bender 57'; Johnsen 89'		Lăcătuș 24'	Stadium: Estadio Riazor

==== Xerox Super Soccer ====
20 January 1990	Bayern Munich	2–1	Japan League XI	Tokyo, Japan

=== Bundesliga ===
29 July 1989 1	Bayern Munich	3–2	1. FC Nürnberg	Munich
15:30 CEST	McInally 30', 46'; Mihajlović 89'	Report	Hausmann 40'; Türr 84'	Stadium: Olympiastadion; Attendance: 57,000; Referee: Gerhard Theobald

5 August 1989 2	Borussia Mönchengladbach	0–0	Bayern Munich	Mönchengladbach
15:30 CEST		Report		Stadium: Bökelbergstadion; Attendance: 34,000; Referee: Hans-Joachim Osmers

9 August 1989 3	Bayern Munich	1–0	FC 08 Homburg	Munich
20:00 CEST	Kögl 70'	Report		Stadium: Olympiastadion; Attendance: 28,000; Referee: Klaus Broska

16 August 1989 4	Karlsruher SC	3–3	Bayern Munich	Karlsruhe
20:00 CEST	Kreuzer 11', 18'; Hermann 53'	Report	Dorfner 5', 28'; Thon 36'	Stadium: Wildparkstadion; Attendance: 37,000; Referee: Hellmut Krug

23 August 1989 5	Bayern Munich	5–1	1. FC Köln	Munich
20:00 CEST	Wohlfarth 17'; Thon 31', 82' (pen.), 85'; Dorfner 61'	Report	Götz 68'	Stadium: Olympiastadion; Attendance: 68,000; Referee: Wolf-Günter Wiesel

26 August 1989 6	SV Waldhof Mannheim	1–0	Bayern Munich	Mannheim
15:30 CEST	Güttler 68'	Report		Stadium: Stadion am Alsenweg; Attendance: 15,200; Referee: Dieter Pauly

31 August 1989 7	Bayern Munich	4–0	Hamburger SV	Munich
19:30 CEST	Thon 30'; Wohlfarth 31', 90'; Kastenmaier 69'	Report		Stadium: Olympiastadion; Attendance: 28,000; Referee: Karl-Josef Assenmacher

9 September 1989 8	Eintracht Frankfurt	1–2	Bayern Munich	Frankfurt
15:30 CEST	Bein 55'	Report	McInally 35'; Wohlfarth 80'	Stadium: Waldstadion; Attendance: 55,000; Referee: Dr. Markus Merk

16 September 1989 9	Bayern Munich	5–1	VfL Bochum	Munich
15:30 CEST	McInally 2', 68'; Schwabl 19'; Oswald 71' (o.g.); Thon 73'	Report	Kohn 70' (pen.)	Stadium: Olympiastadion; Attendance: 26,000; Referee: Wilfried Heitmann

20 September 1989 10	VfB Stuttgart	2–1	Bayern Munich	Stuttgart
20:00 CEST	Basualdo 43'; Walter 62'	Report	Wohlfarth 69'	Stadium: Neckarstadion; Attendance: 68,000; Referee: Hans-Jürgen Weber

30 September 1989 11	Bayern Munich	3–0	Bayer 05 Uerdingen	Munich
15:30 CET	Thon 9' (pen.), 82'; Wohlfarth 51'	Report		Stadium: Olympiastadion; Attendance: 33,000; Referee: Karl-Heinz Tritschler

7 October 1989 12	1. FC Kaiserslautern	0–0	Bayern Munich	Kaiserslautern
15:30 CET		Report		Stadium: Fritz-Walter-Stadion; Attendance: 35,335; Referee: Hans-Heinrich Barnick

14 October 1989 13	Fortuna Düsseldorf	1–2	Bayern Munich	Düsseldorf
15:30 CET	Augenthaler 60' (o.g.)	Report	Schwabl 5'; Wohlfarth 32'	Stadium: Rheinstadion; Attendance: 55,000; Referee: Wolfgang Mierswa

21 October 1989 14	Bayern Munich	0–1	Bayer 04 Leverkusen	Munich
15:30 CET		Report	Leśniak 14'	Stadium: Olympiastadion; Attendance: 29,000; Referee: Edgar Steinborn

27 October 1989 15	FC St. Pauli	0–2	Bayern Munich	St. Pauli
19:30 CET		Report	Strunz 79'; Bender 86'	Stadium: Wilhelm-Koch-Stadion; Attendance: 20,551; Referee: Klaus Broska

4 November 1989 16	Bayern Munich	1–1	SV Werder Bremen	Munich
15:30 CET	Kögl 68' (pen.)	Report	Riedle 83'	Stadium: Olympiastadion; Attendance: 32,000; Referee: Manfred Neuner

18 November 1989 17	Borussia Dortmund	2–2	Bayern Munich	Dortmund
15:30 CET	Brietzke 73'; Möller 74'	Report	Flick 26'; Strunz 28'	Stadium: Westfalenstadion; Attendance: 54,000; Referee: Wolf-Günter Wiesel

25 November 1989 18	1. FC Nürnberg	4–0	Bayern Munich	Nuremberg
15:30 CET	Brunner 34' (pen.); Türr 55'; Dusend 72'; Kristl 75'	Report		Stadium: Städtisches Stadion; Attendance: 46,500; Referee: Hans-Jürgen Weber

2 December 1989 19	Bayern Munich	2–0	Borussia Mönchengladbach	Munich
15:30 CET	Wohlfarth 5'; McInally 76'	Report		Stadium: Olympiastadion; Attendance: 20,000; Referee: Manfred Harder

9 December 1989 20	FC 08 Homburg	1–3	Bayern Munich	Homburg
14:00 CET	Maciel 19'	Report	Mihajlović 16'; McInally 72', 90'	Stadium: Waldstadion Homburg; Attendance: 15,000; Referee: Peter Richmann

16 December 1989 21	Bayern Munich	4–1	Karlsruher SC	Munich
14:30 CET	Wohlfarth 45', 51', 66'; Schwabl 62'	Report	Süss 26'	Stadium: Olympiastadion; Attendance: 47,000; Referee: Bodo Kriegelstein

23 February 1990 22	1. FC Köln	1–1	Bayern Munich	Cologne
20:00 CET	Sturm 4'	Report	Kögl 55'	Stadium: Müngersdorfer Stadion; Attendance: 59,000; Referee: Gerhard Theobald

3 March 1990 23	Bayern Munich	2–0	SV Waldhof Mannheim	Munich
15:30 CET	Augenthaler 6'; Strunz 37'	Report		Stadium: Olympiastadion; Attendance: 11,000; Referee: Hans-Joachim Osmers

10 March 1990 24	Hamburger SV	0–3	Bayern Munich	Hamburg
15:30 CET		Report	Dorfner 6'; McInally 68'; Bender 71'	Stadium: Volksparkstadion; Attendance: 32,000; Referee: Karl-Josef Assenmacher

17 March 1990 25	Bayern Munich	1–0	Eintracht Frankfurt	Munich
15:30 CET	Strunz 58'	Report		Stadium: Olympiastadion; Attendance: 70,000; Referee: Dieter Pauly

24 March 1990 26	VfL Bochum	0–0	Bayern Munich	Bochum
15:30 CET		Report		Stadium: Ruhrstadion; Attendance: 33,000; Referee: Manfred Harder

31 March 1989 27	Bayern Munich	3–1	VfB Stuttgart	Munich
15:30 CEST	Wohlfarth 26'; Pflügler 65'; Kohler 70'	Report	Walter 22'	Stadium: Olympiastadion; Attendance: 47,000; Referee: Hellmut Krug

7 April 1990 28	Bayer 05 Uerdingen	2–2	Bayern Munich	Krefeld
15:30 CEST	Reich 48'; Funkel 87'	Report	McInally 34'; Dorfner 65'	Stadium: Grotenburg-Stadion; Attendance: 22,200; Referee: Wolf-Günter Wiesel

12 April 1990 29	Bayern Munich	3–0	1. FC Kaiserslautern	Munich
20:00 CEST	Kögl 5'; Wohlfarth 13'; Pflügler 83'	Report		Stadium: Olympiastadion; Attendance: 16,000; Referee: Peter Richmann

21 April 1990 30	Bayern Munich	0–0	Fortuna Düsseldorf	Munich
15:30 CEST		Report		Stadium: Olympiastadion; Attendance: 25,000; Referee: Heinz Werner

28 April 1990 31	Bayer 04 Leverkusen	0–0	Bayern Munich	Leverkusen
15:30 CEST		Report		Stadium: Ulrich-Haberland-Stadion; Attendance: 27,000; Referee: Wilfried Heitmann

2 May 1990 32	Bayern Munich	1–0	FC St. Pauli	Munich
20:00 CEST	Pflügler 16'	Report		Stadium: Olympiastadion; Attendance: 18,000; Referee: Lothar Löwer

5 May 1990 33	SV Werder Bremen	2–2	Bayern Munich	Bremen
15:30 CEST	Harttgen 28', 38'	Report	Kohler 48'; Mihajlović 71'	Stadium: Weserstadion; Attendance: 30,100; Referee: Georg Dardenne

12 May 1990 34	Bayern Munich	3–0	Borussia Dortmund	Munich
18:30 CEST	Mihajlović 6'; Strunz 55'; Grahammer 68'	Report		Stadium: Olympiastadion; Attendance: 61,000; Referee: Dr. Wolf-Rüdiger Umbach

==== Results by round ====
Round	1	2	3	4	5	6	7	8	9	10	11	12	13	14	15	16	17	18	19	20	21	22	23	24	25	26	27	28	29	30	31	32	33	34
Ground	H	A	H	A	H	A	H	A	H	A	H	A	A	H	A	H	A	A	H	A	H	A	H	A	H	A	H	A	H	H	A	H	A	H
Result	W	D	W	D	W	L	W	W	W	L	W	D	W	L	W	D	D	L	W	W	W	D	W	W	W	D	W	D	W	D	D	W	D	W
Position	4	4	4	3	2	2	1	1	1	1	1	2	1	2	1	2	1	3	2	1	1	1	1	1	1	1	1	1	1	1	1	1	1	1

A = Away; H = Home; W = Win; D = Draw; L = Loss

==== League standings ====
Pos	Team	Pld	W	D	L	GF	GA	GD	Pts	Qualification or relegation
1	Bayern Munich (C)	34	19	11	4	64	28	+36	49	Qualification to European Cup first round
2	1. FC Köln	34	17	9	8	54	44	+10	43	Qualification to UEFA Cup first round
3	Eintracht Frankfurt	34	15	11	8	61	40	+21	41	Qualification to UEFA Cup first round
4	Borussia Dortmund	34	15	11	8	51	35	+16	41	Qualification to UEFA Cup first round
5	Bayer Leverkusen	34	12	15	7	40	32	+8	39	Qualification to UEFA Cup first round

Source: www.dfb.de
Rules for classification: 1) points; 2) goal difference; 3) number of goals scored.
(C) Champions

=== DFB Pokal ===
19 August 1989 1st Round	Eintracht Frankfurt	0–1	Bayern Munich	Frankfurt
		Report	Augenthaler 34'	Stadium: Waldstadion; Attendance: 48,600; Referee: Striegel

23 September 1989 2nd Round	Bayern Munich	2–0	SV Waldhof Mannheim	Munich
	Kögl 28', 80'	Report		Stadium: Olympiastadion; Attendance: 20,000; Referee: Heinz Werner

9 November 1989 3rd Round	VfB Stuttgart	3–0	Bayern Munich	Stuttgart
	Walter 43', 77'; Hartmann 64'	Report		Stadium: Neckarstadion; Attendance: 67,800; Referee: Hans-Peter Dellwing

=== DFB-Supercup ===
25 July 1989	Bayern Munich	3–4	Borussia Dortmund	Kaiserslautern
	McInally 21'; Grahammer 42'; Mihajlović 66'		Breitzke 40', 56'; Wegmann 64'; Möller 88'	Stadium: Fritz-Walter-Stadion; Attendance: 16,000; Referee: Hans-Peter Dellwing

=== European Cup ===
==== 1st round ====
13 September 1989 1st leg	Rangers F.C. (Scotland)	1–3	(West Germany) Bayern Munich	Glasgow, Scotland
19:30 BST	Walters 25' (pen.)		Kögl 28'; Thon 46' (pen.); Augenthaler 65'	Stadium: Ibrox Stadium; Attendance: 42,000; Referee: Pietro D'elia (Italy)

27 September 1989 2nd leg	Bayern Munich (West Germany)	0–0 (3–1 agg.)	(Scotland) Rangers F.C.	Munich, West Germany
20:00 CET				Stadium: Olympiastadion; Attendance: 45,000; Referee: Erik Fredriksson (Sweden)

==== 2nd round ====
18 October 1989 1st leg	Bayern Munich (West Germany)	3–1	(Albania) 17 Nëntori Tirana	Munich, West Germany
20:00 CET	Kögl 16' (pen.); Mihajlović 26', 64'		Minga 30'	Stadium: Olympiastadion; Attendance: 11,500; Referee: Roger Philippi (Luxembourg)

1 November 1989 2nd leg	17 Nëntori Tirana (Albania)	0–3 (1–6 agg.)	(West Germany) Bayern Munich	Tirana, Albania
14:00 CET			Strunz 45'; Grahammer 47'; Dorfner 89'	Stadium: Qemal Stafa Stadium; Attendance: 33,000; Referee: Dušan Krchnak (Czechoslovakia)

==== Quarter-finals ====
7 March 1990 1st leg	Bayern Munich (West Germany)	2–1	(Netherlands) PSV Eindhoven	Munich, West Germany
20:15 CET	Wohlfarth 75'; Grahammer 80'		Povlsen 77'	Stadium: Olympiastadion; Attendance: 35,000; Referee: Marcel Van Langenhove (Belgium)

21 March 1990 2nd leg	PSV Eindhoven (Netherlands)	0–1 (1–3 agg.)	(West Germany) Bayern Munich	Eindhoven, Netherlands
19:30 CET			Augenthaler 90'	Stadium: Philips Stadion; Attendance: 28,000; Referee: Helmut Kohl (Austria)

==== Semi-finals ====
4 April 1990 1st leg	A.C. Milan (Italy)	1–0	(West Germany) Bayern Munich	Milan, Italy
20:30 CET	van Basten 77' (pen.)			Stadium: San Siro; Attendance: 62,000; Referee: Bo Karlsson (Sweden)

18 April 1990 2nd leg	Bayern Munich (West Germany)	2–1 (a.e.t.) (2–2 a agg.)	(Italy) A.C. Milan	Munich, West Germany
20:30 CET	Strunz 59'; McInally 106'		Borgonovo 101'	Stadium: Olympiastadion; Attendance: 72,000; Referee: Emilio Soriano Aladrén (Spain)

== Team statistics ==
Competition	First match	Last match	Starting round	Final position	Record							
Competition	First match	Last match	Starting round	Final position	G	W	D	L	GF	GA	GD	Win %
Bundesliga	29 July 1989	12 May 1990	Matchday 1	Winner	34	19	11	4	64	28	+36	55.88
DFB-Pokal	19 August 1989	9 November 1989	First round	Third round	3	2	0	1	3	3	+0	66.67
DFB-Supercup	25 July 1989		Final	Runner-up	1	0	0	1	3	4	−1	0.00
European Cup	13 September 1989	18 April 1990	First round	Semifinals	8	6	1	1	14	5	+9	75.00
Total					46	27	12	7	84	40	+44	58.70

== Players ==
=== Squad, appearances and goals ===
No.	Pos	Nat	Player	Total		Bundesliga		DFB-Pokal		European Cup	
No.	Pos	Nat	Player	Apps	Goals	Apps	Goals	Apps	Goals	Apps	Goals
	GK	(West Germany) FRG	Raimond Aumann	43	0	33+0	0	3+0	0	7+0	0
	GK	(West Germany) FRG	Sven Scheuer	2	0	1+0	0	0+0	0	1+0	0
	DF	(West Germany) FRG	Hans Pflügler	44	3	32+1	3	3+0	0	8+0	0
	DF	(West Germany) FRG	Stefan Reuter	44	0	33+0	0	3+0	0	8+0	0
	DF	(West Germany) FRG	Roland Grahammer	38	3	26+2	1	3+0	0	6+1	2
	DF	(West Germany) FRG	Klaus Augenthaler (captain)	35	3	24+0	1	3+0	1	8+0	1
	DF	(West Germany) FRG	Jürgen Kohler	34	2	26+0	2	2+0	0	6+0	0
	DF	(Norway) NOR	Erland Johnsen	10	0	7+1	0	0+0	0	2+0	0
	MF	(West Germany) FRG	Hans Dorfner	37	6	29+0	5	2+0	0	6+0	1
	MF	(West Germany) FRG	Manfred Schwabl	31	3	16+9	3	1+1	0	3+1	0
	MF	(West Germany) FRG	Thomas Strunz	28	7	17+3	5	0+2	0	6+0	2
	MF	(West Germany) FRG	Olaf Thon	26	9	19+1	8	2+0	0	3+1	1
	MF	(West Germany) FRG	Manfred Bender	25	2	4+16	2	0+1	0	1+3	0
	MF	(West Germany) FRG	Hansi Flick	24	1	17+5	1	1+0	0	1+0	0
	MF	(West Germany) FRG	Thomas Kastenmaier	14	1	3+6	1	2+0	0	1+2	0
	FW	(Scotland) SCO	Alan McInally	42	11	28+3	10	3+0	0	6+2	1
	FW	(West Germany) FRG	Ludwig Kögl	35	8	21+4	4	3+0	2	7+0	2
	FW	(West Germany) FRG	Roland Wohlfarth	32	14	23+1	13	1+1	0	5+1	1
	FW	(Socialist Federal Republic of Yugoslavia) YUG	Radmilo Mihajlović	32	6	16+9	4	2+1	0	3+1	2

=== Bookings ===
No.	Player	Bundesliga			DFB-Pokal			European Cup			Total		
No.	Player	Booked	(yellow card) (red card)	Sent off (straight red)	Booked	(yellow card) (red card)	Sent off (straight red)	Booked	(yellow card) (red card)	Sent off (straight red)	Booked	(yellow card) (red card)	Sent off (straight red)
	Roland Grahammer	9	0	0	2	0	0	3	0	0	14	0	0
	Stefan Reuter	6	0	0	1	0	0	1	0	0	8	0	0
	Klaus Augenthaler	4	0	0	2	0	0	1	0	0	7	0	0
	Hans Dorfner	4	0	0	0	0	0	1	0	0	5	0	0
	Jürgen Kohler	3	0	0	1	0	0	0	0	0	4	0	0
	Hans Pflügler	2	0	0	1	0	0	1	0	0	4	0	0
	Thomas Strunz	4	0	0	0	0	0	0	0	0	4	0	0
	Hansi Flick	3	0	0	0	0	0	0	0	0	3	0	0
	Alan McInally	3	0	0	0	0	0	0	0	0	3	0	0
	Roland Wohlfarth	1	0	0	0	0	0	2	0	0	3	0	0
	Olaf Thon	2	0	0	0	0	0	0	0	0	2	0	0
	Raimond Aumann	1	0	0	0	0	0	0	0	0	1	0	0
	Manfred Bender	1	0	0	0	0	0	0	0	0	1	0	0
	Erland Johnsen	1	0	0	0	0	0	0	0	0	1	0	0
	Ludwig Kögl	1	0	0	0	0	0	0	0	0	1	0	0
	Manfred Schwabl	1	0	0	0	0	0	0	0	0	1	0	0
Totals		46	0	0	7	0	0	9	0	0	62	0	0

== Team kit ==
90th anniversary (against Cologne and Hamburg)

== Transfers ==
=== In ===
No.	Pos.	Nat.	Name	Age	EU	Moving from	Type	Transfer window	Ends	Transfer fee	Source
	FW	(Scotland)	Alan McInally	26	EU	Aston Villa (England)	Transfer	Summer		€1.65 Million	
	DF	(West Germany)	Jürgen Kohler	23	EU	1. FC Köln	Transfer	Summer		€1.55 Million	
	FW	(Socialist Federal Republic of Yugoslavia)	Radmilo Mihajlović	24	Non-EU	Dinamo Zagreb (Croatia)	Transfer	Summer		€900,000	
	MF	(West Germany)	Thomas Strunz	21	EU	MSV Duisburg	Transfer	Summer		€550,000	
	MF	(West Germany)	Manfred Schwabl	23	EU	1. FC Nürnberg	Transfer	Summer		€250,000	
	MF	(West Germany)	Manfred Bender	23	EU	SpVgg Unterhaching	Transfer	Summer		€17,500	
	GK	(West Germany)	Sven Scheuer	23	EU	Youth system	Promoted	Summer			

=== Out ===
No.	Pos.	Nat.	Name	Age	EU	Moving to	Type	Transfer window	Transfer fee	Source
	FW	(Sweden)	Johnny Ekström	24	Non-EU	Cannes (France)	Transfer	Summer	€1 Million	
	MF	(West Germany)	Armin Eck	24	EU	Hamburger SV	Transfer	Summer	€740,000	
	MF	(East Germany)	Norbert Nachtweih	32	Non-EU	Cannes (France)	Transfer	Summer	€250,000	
	FW	(West Germany)	Jürgen Wegmann	25	EU	Borussia Dortmund	Transfer	Summer	Undisclosed	
	FW	(Denmark)	Lars Lunde	25	EU	Zug 94 (Switzerland)	Transfer	Summer	Undisclosed	
	DF	(West Germany)	Matthias Hamann	21	EU	Fortuna Köln	Transfer	Summer	Undisclosed	
	MF	(West Germany)	Helmut Winklhofer	27	EU		End of Career	Summer		
	DF	(Norway)	Erland Johnsen	22	Non-EU	Chelsea (England)	Transfer	Winter		
