= Berti Vogts =

German footballer and manager

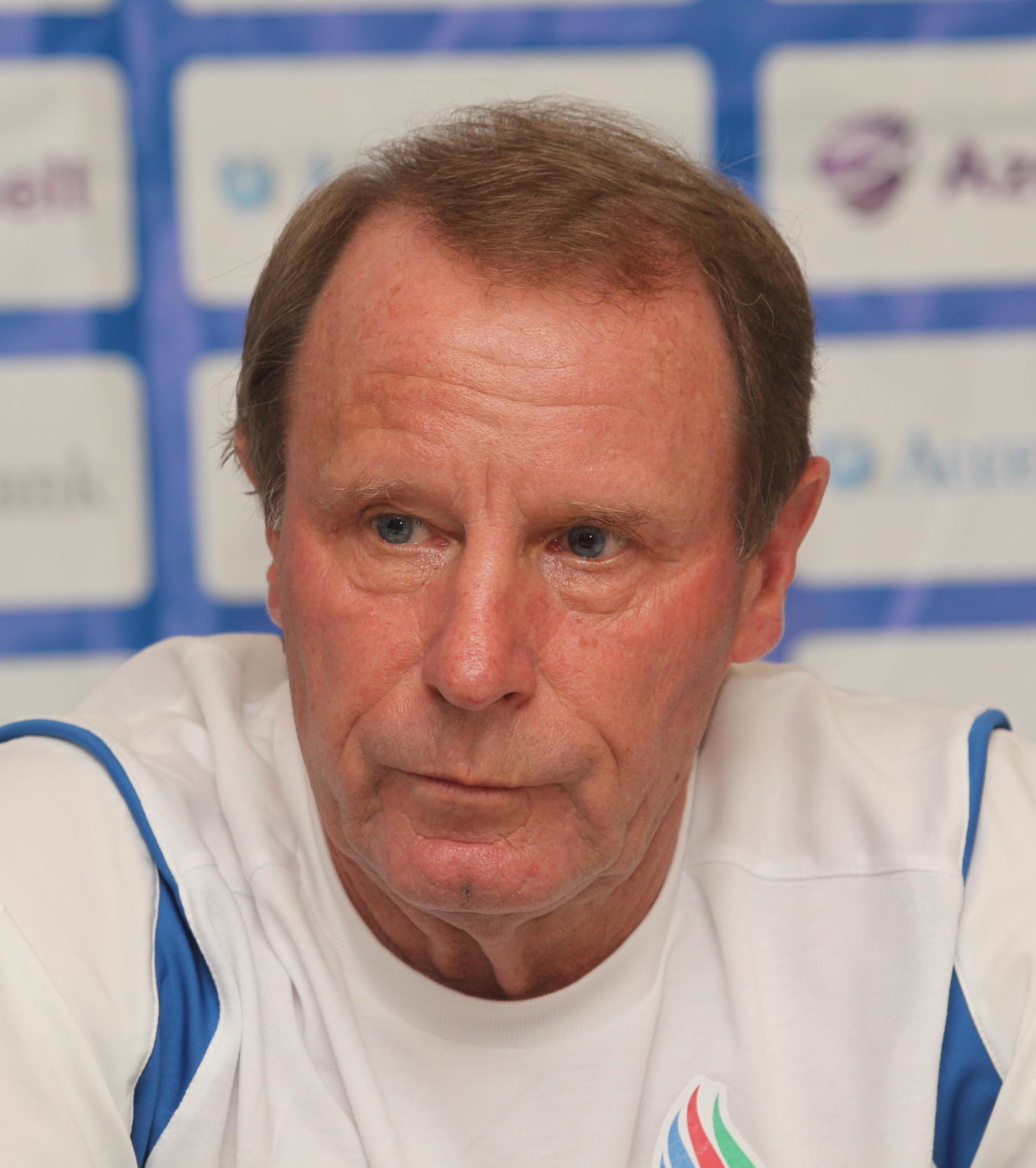
- Vogts with Azerbaijan in 2014

Personal information
- Full name: Hans-Hubert Vogts
- Date of birth: 30 December 1946 (age 79)
- Place of birth: Büttgen, Germany
- Height: 1.68 m (5 ft 6 in)
- Position: Defender

Youth career
- 1954–1965: VfR Büttgen

Senior career*
Years	Team	Apps	(Gls)
1965–1979	Borussia Mönchengladbach	419	(32)

International career
1967–1978	West Germany	96	(1)

Managerial career
- 1979–1990: West Germany U21
- 1990–1998: Germany
- 2000–2001: Bayer Leverkusen
- 2001–2002: Kuwait
- 2002–2004: Scotland
- 2007–2008: Nigeria
- 2008–2014: Azerbaijan
Medal record
Men's football
Representing West Germany (as player)
FIFA World Cup
Winner	1974
Third place	1970
UEFA European Championship
Winner	1972
Runner-up	1976
Representing Germany (as manager)
UEFA European Championship
Winner	1996
Runner-up	1992
- * Club domestic league appearances and goals

Hans-Hubert "Berti" Vogts (German pronunciation: [ˈbɛʁtiː ˈfoːkts]; born 30 December 1946) is a German former football manager and player. A defender, he played for Borussia Mönchengladbach his whole club career and won the FIFA World Cup with West Germany in 1974. Vogts later managed Germany, winning the UEFA European Championship in 1996.

He also managed Bayer Leverkusen in the Bundesliga and the national teams of Kuwait, Scotland, Nigeria and Azerbaijan.

== Early life ==
Hans-Hubert Vogts was born on 30 December 1946.

== Club career ==
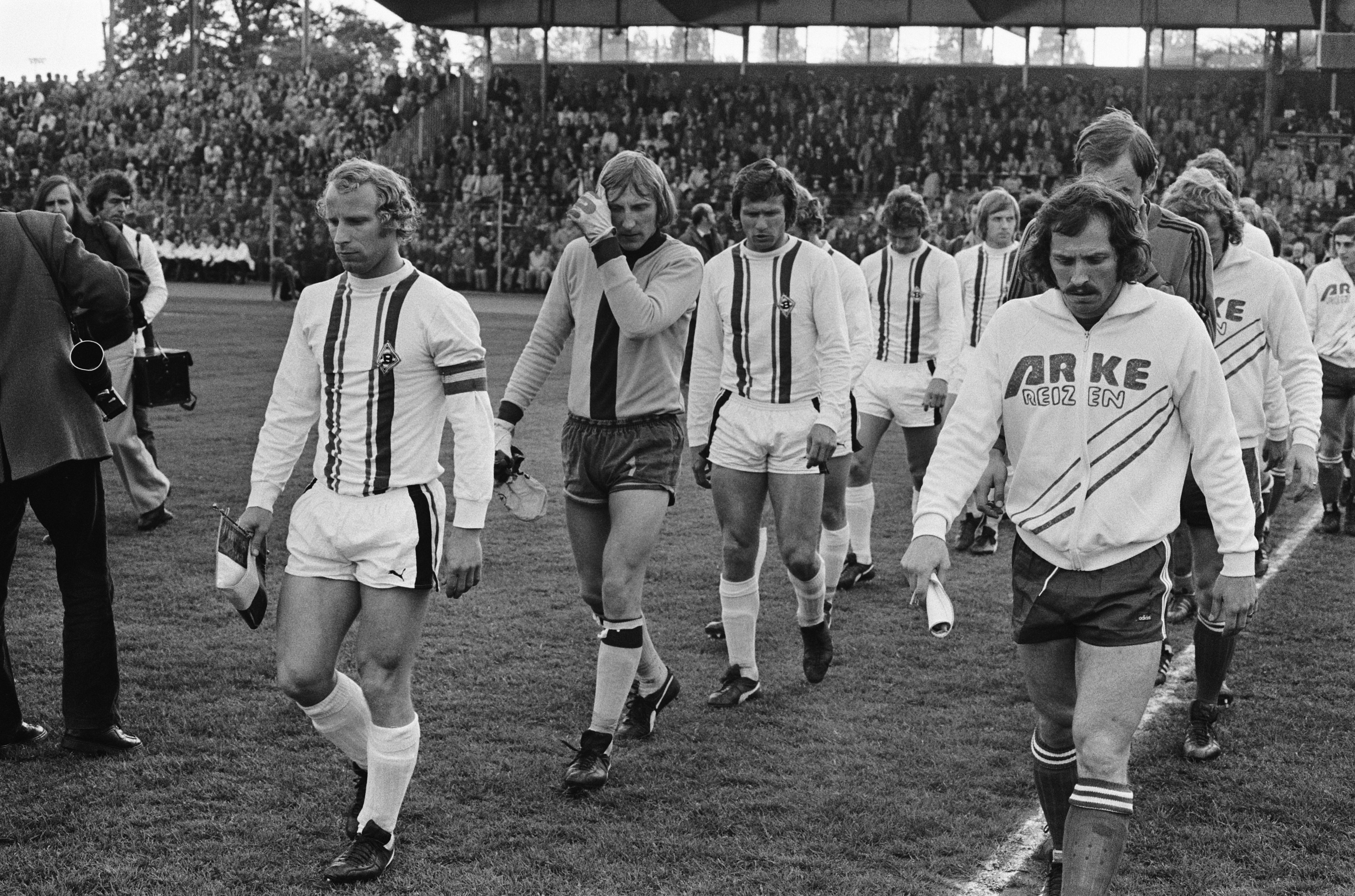
Vogts (left) with Borussia Mönchengladbach in 1975.

Vogts joined the boys' football team of local sports club VfR Büttgen in 1954, at the age of seven, staying with them until his transfer in 1965 to Borussia Mönchengladbach. A right back, his tenacity earned him the nickname "Der Terrier".

He was one of the key players, along with Rainer Bonhof, Herbert Wimmer, Uli Stielike, Allan Simonsen and Jupp Heynckes, during Borussia's golden years in the 1970s, when it won the Bundesliga five times, the German Cup once, and the UEFA Cup twice. Vogts also played in the 1977 European Cup Final defeat by Liverpool.

Vogts made 419 Bundesliga appearances for Mönchengladbach, scoring 32 times, and also appeared 64 times for the club in European competition, scoring eight goals. Vogts remained with Mönchengladbach, until he retired from playing in 1979.

== International career ==
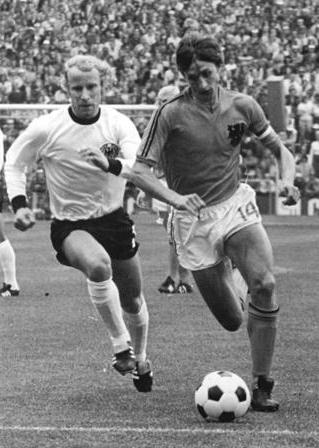
Vogts (left) shadowing Johan Cruyff in the 1974 FIFA World Cup Final

Vogts played nine international boys' games for West Germany, made three appearances for the under 23s team, and has 96 senior caps, making him one of Germany's most capped players. He was captain for twenty of the senior games, scored one international goal and was also a member of the Germany national team that won the 1974 World Cup.

Nicknamed "Der Terrier" for always fighting for every ball as if it were his last, Vogts was a big favourite with his home crowd. Vogts famously marked, and subdued, Johan Cruyff, in the final of the 1974 World Cup in Munich, won by West Germany 2–1.

During the match between West Germany and Austria on 21 June 1978, in the second round of the 1978 FIFA World Cup, Vogts scored an own goal. Austria went on to win the match 3–2 and prevented West Germany from advancing in the competition. The match is fondly known in Austria as the Miracle of Córdoba, as it was their first victory against West Germany for 47 years.

== Managerial career ==
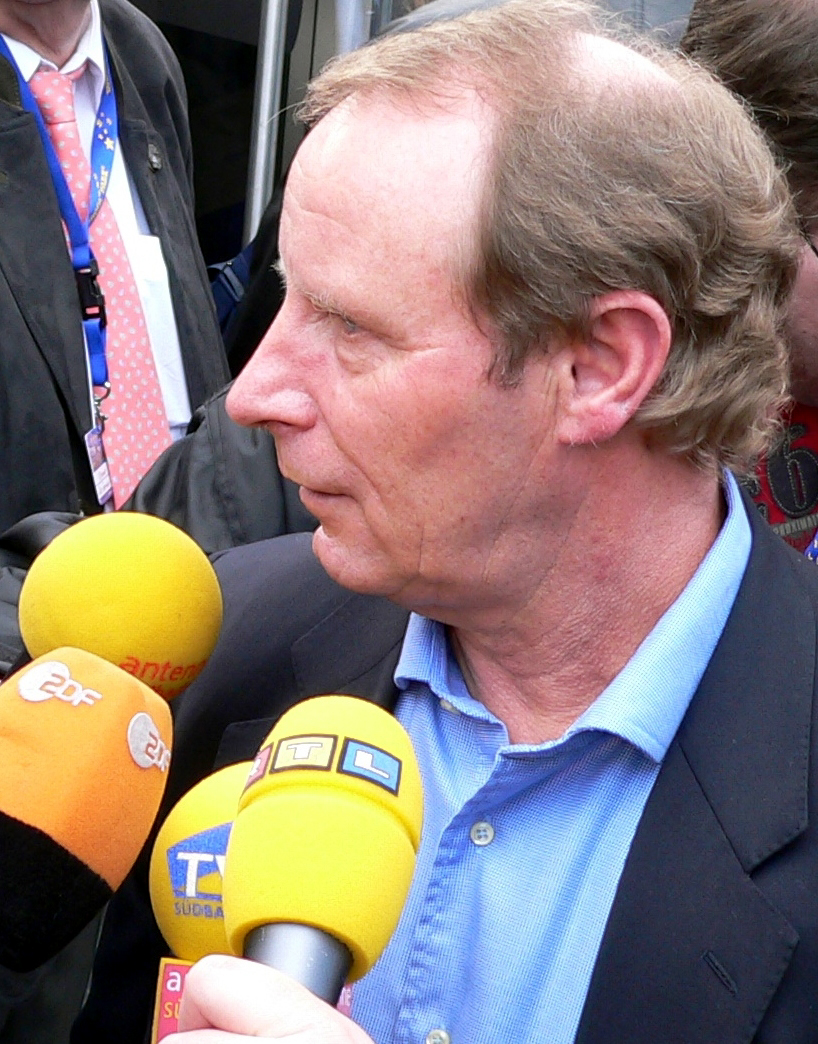
Vogts in May 2006

=== West Germany and Germany ===
After his playing career ended, Vogts became coach of the West Germany under 21 national team, and continued in that role until 1990. Starting in 1986, he became an assistant manager of the senior national side. He was promoted to manager of Germany in August 1990, succeeding Franz Beckenbauer.

After winning the 1990 FIFA World Cup Final the month before, Beckenbauer famously said that the reunified Germany will "probably be unbeatable for years", a statement which turned out to be a burden for Vogts during the upcoming years. Although Vogts led the Germany national team to a UEFA Euro 1992 runner up finish and winning the next Euros in 1996, two World Cup quarter-final defeats in 1994 and 1998 are also on his sheet. He stepped down as manager in September 1998.

=== Bayer Leverkusen ===
In November 2000, after some time out of managing, he was appointed manager of Bayer Leverkusen. The following May, despite earning Bayer Leverkusen qualification for the Champions League, he was sacked.

=== Kuwait ===
Three months later, in August 2001, he became manager of the Kuwait national team.

=== Scotland ===
Vogts resigned his position with Kuwait in January 2002, after six months in the post, to assume a similar position with the Scotland national team. In qualifying for Euro 2004, Vogts took Scotland to a play off place, finishing second in their group to Germany. In the playoffs, Scotland were drawn against the Netherlands and Vogts led them to a 1–0 victory at Hampden Park, but the Netherlands beat Scotland 6–0 in the return leg.

The Scottish press became notably more hostile towards Vogts following a series of defeats in friendly matches. A 1–1 draw with Moldova in October 2004 essentially put paid to Scotland's hopes of qualifying for the 2006 World Cup. Vogts resigned on 1 November, with a year and a half remaining on his contract, citing "disgraceful abuse". Nine days after Vogts resigned, Scotland dropped to a record low of 77th place in the FIFA World Rankings.

=== Nigeria ===
In January 2007, Vogts was appointed manager of Nigeria, and signed a four-year contract. Nigeria were eliminated in the quarter finals of the 2008 Africa Cup of Nations, which was their worst performance in the competition since 1982. Vogts resigned from his position in February 2008.

=== Azerbaijan ===
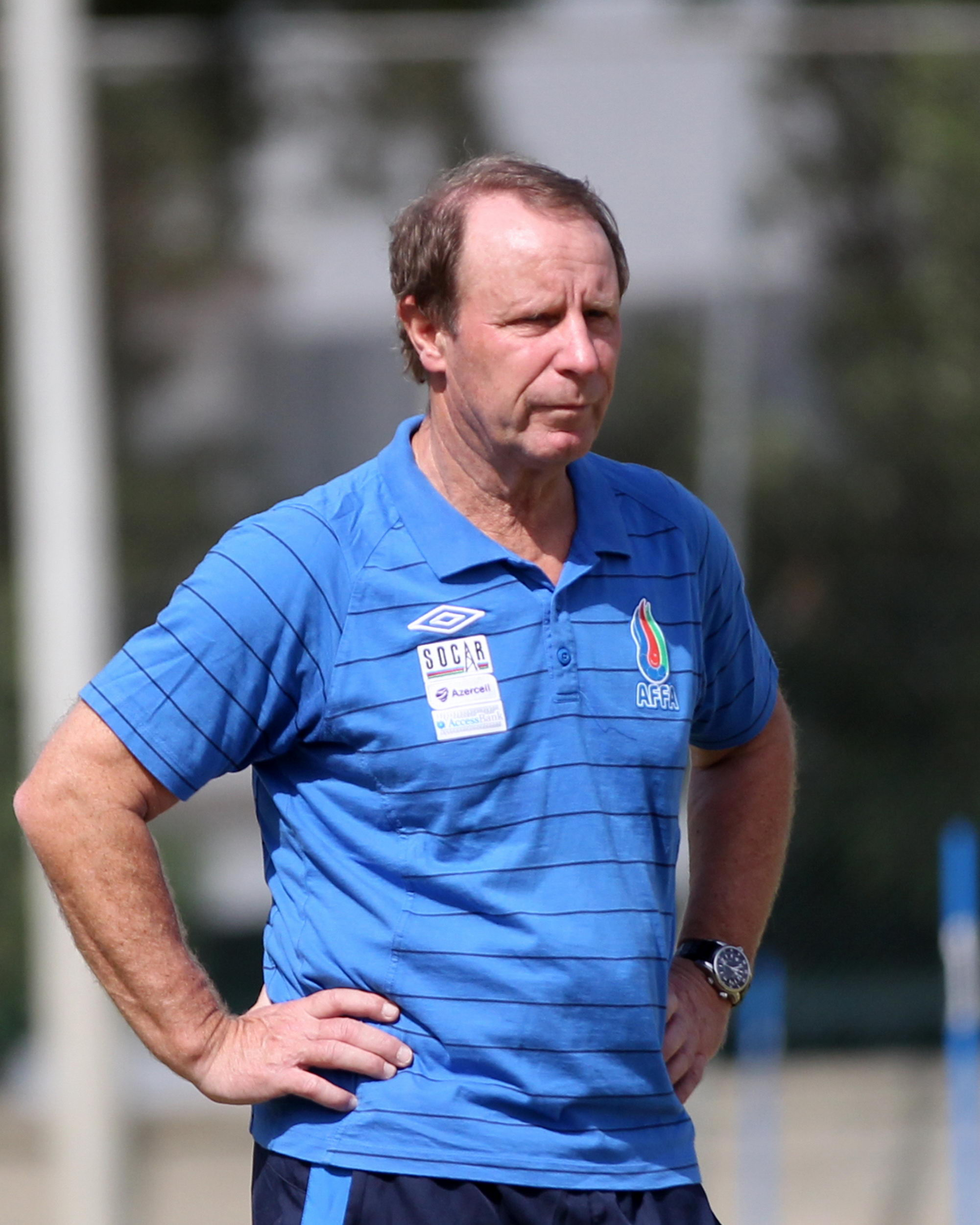
Vogts at a training session in February 2014

In April 2008, he was appointed manager of Azerbaijan, on a two-year contract. In December 2009, he extended his contract with AFFA until the end of qualifying for Euro 2012, after successful results.

In October 2014, he resigned from his position as Azerbaijan manager, after a 6–0 defeat against Croatia. Azerbaijan had lost all of their first three matches in UEFA Euro 2016 qualifying Group H. Under Vogts, Azerbaijan had some poor results, not being able to win against second string sides, forcing Vogts to face major criticism from local supporters and the media.

=== United States ===
In March 2014, Vogts was appointed by Jürgen Klinsmann as a special advisor to the United States, for the 2014 World Cup.

Vogts was appointed as a technical advisor in March 2015. After the dismissal of Klinsmann, Vogts' employment also ended.

== Career statistics ==
Appearances and goals by club, season and competition
Club	Season	League			DFB-Pokal		Europe		Total	
Club	Season	Division	Apps	Goals	Apps	Goals	Apps	Goals	Apps	Goals
Borussia Mönchengladbach	1965–66	Bundesliga	34	0	2	0	—		36	0
Borussia Mönchengladbach	1966–67	Bundesliga	34	1	1	0	—		35	1
Borussia Mönchengladbach	1967–68	Bundesliga	34	6	3	0	—		37	6
Borussia Mönchengladbach	1968–69	Bundesliga	34	8	2	0	—		36	8
Borussia Mönchengladbach	1969–70	Bundesliga	34	5	3	1	—		37	6
Borussia Mönchengladbach	1970–71	Bundesliga	34	1	4	0	4 (Note: Appearances in European Cup)	2	42	3
Borussia Mönchengladbach	1971–72	Bundesliga	19	1	2	0	4	0	25	1
Borussia Mönchengladbach	1972–73	Bundesliga	34	3	9	0	12 (Note: Appearances in UEFA Cup)	2	55	5
Borussia Mönchengladbach	1973–74	Bundesliga	27	3	3	0	7 (Note: Appearances in European Cup Winners' Cup)	1	37	4
Borussia Mönchengladbach	1974–75	Bundesliga	34	0	2	0	12	2	48	2
Borussia Mönchengladbach	1975–76	Bundesliga	34	1	4	1	6	0	44	2
Borussia Mönchengladbach	1976–77	Bundesliga	27	1	1	0	9	1	37	2
Borussia Mönchengladbach	1977–78	Bundesliga	34	2	5	0	8	0	47	2
Borussia Mönchengladbach	1978–79	Bundesliga	6	0	1	0	3	0	10	0
Career total			419	32	42	2	65	8	526	42

== Managerial statistics ==
As of 17 October 2014

Team	From	To	Record					
Team	From	To	G	W	D	L	Win %	Ref.
Germany	9 August 1990	7 September 1998	102	66	24	12	64.71	
Bayer Leverkusen	14 November 2000	21 May 2001	25	11	3	11	44.00	
Kuwait	12 August 2001	28 February 2002	11	2	6	3	18.18	
Scotland	1 March 2002	2 November 2004	31	8	7	16	25.81	
Nigeria	15 January 2007	20 February 2008	15	7	3	5	46.67	
Azerbaijan	1 April 2008	17 October 2014	71	15	22	34	21.13	
Total			255	109	65	81	42.75	

== Honours ==
=== Player ===
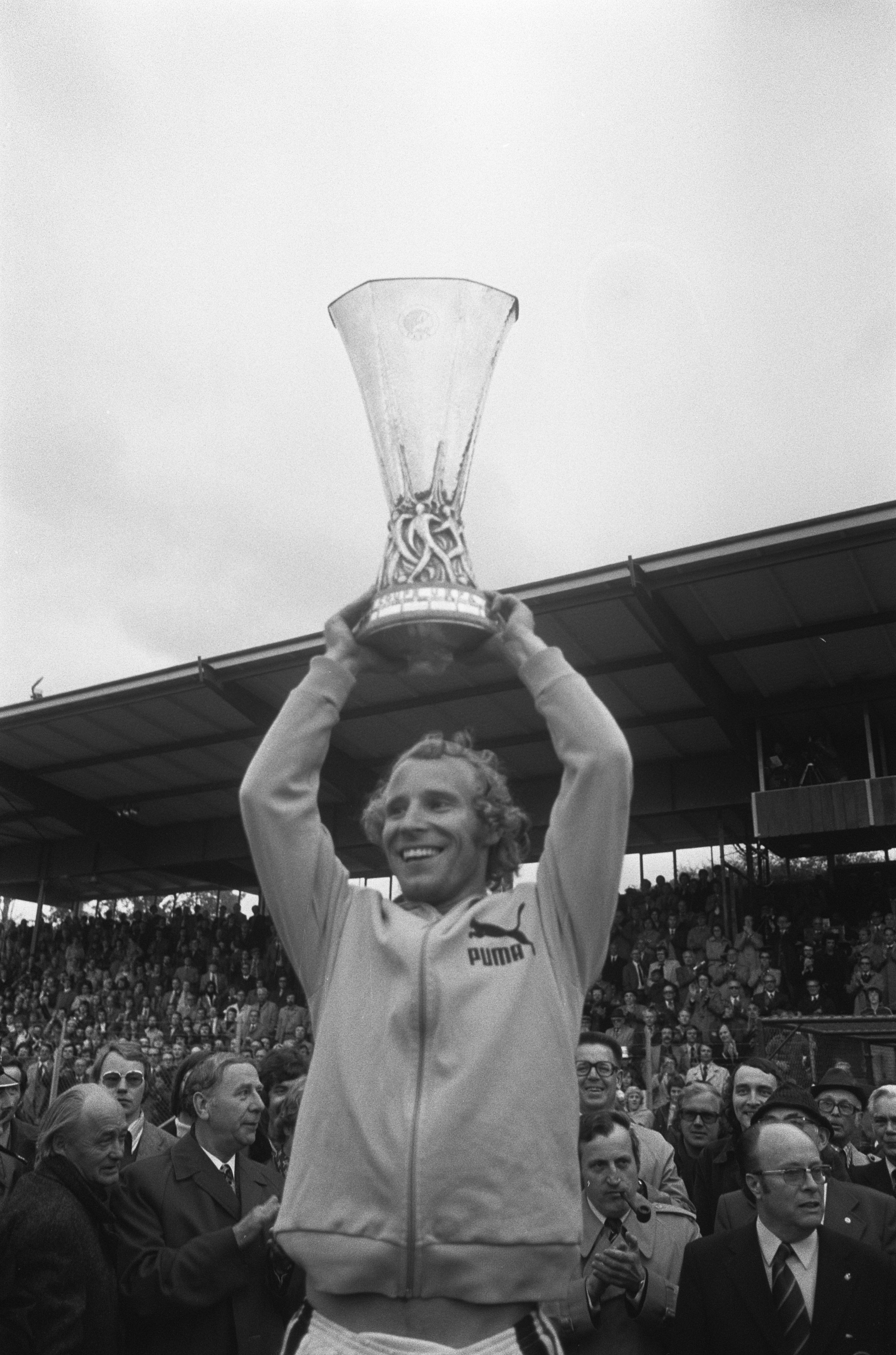
Vogts lifting the UEFA Cup in 1975.

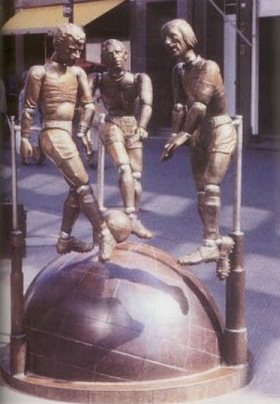
Bronze monument depicting Herbert Wimmer, Berti Vogts and Günter Netzer in Mönchengladbach.

Borussia Mönchengladbach

- Bundesliga: 1969–70, 1970–71, 1974–75, 1975–76, 1976–77
- DFB-Pokal: 1972–73
- UEFA Cup: 1974–75, 1978–79
- European Cup runner-up: 1976–77

West Germany

- FIFA World Cup: 1974
- UEFA European Championship: 1972

Individual

- kicker Bundesliga Team of the Season: 1965–66, 1967–68, 1968–69, 1969–70, 1970–71, 1972–73, 1974–75, 1975–76, 1976–77
- Footballer of the Year (Germany): 1971, 1979
- FIFA World Cup All-Star Team: 1974, 1978
- FUWO European Team of the Season: 1970
- Sport Ideal European XI: 1971, 1975, 1976, 1977
- World XI: 1971, 1975, 1977
- Onze Mondial: 1976, 1977

=== Manager ===
Germany

- UEFA European Championship: 1996

Individual

- World Soccer Magazine World Manager of the Year: 1996

== See also ==
- National team managers with 100 or more matches
- List of one-club men
