= 1975–76 Borussia Mönchengladbach season =

Borussia Mönchengladbach
1975–76 season
- Manager: Udo Lattek
- Stadium: Bökelbergstadion
- Bundesliga: 1st
- DFB-Pokal: Round of 16
- European Cup: Quarter-finals

The 1975–76 season was the 76th season in the history of Borussia Mönchengladbach. They competed in the Bundesliga, the top tier of German football, the DFB-Pokal and the European Cup. They were German football champions for the fourth time in their history and for the second consecutive season, having won the Bundesliga with 45 points. They were eliminated from the DFB-Pokal at the Round of 16 stage and from the European Cup at the quarter-final stage.

== Season summary ==
Under manager Hennes Weisweiler, Borussia Mönchengladbach won both the Bundesliga and the European Cup in the 1974–75 season, though Weisweiler left the club at the end of the season to manage FC Barcelona, and was replaced by Udo Lattek. With a more cautious style of play than his predecessor, Lattek led the club to their second consecutive Bundesliga title and fourth overall. He also took the club to a European Cup quarter-final against Real Madrid where, after a 2–2 draw at home in the first leg, the club draw 1–1 away on 17 March 1976 which allowed Real to advance to the semi-finals. With the score at 1–1, Mönchengladbach had two goals disallowed, leading to accusations from the Gladbach support that the referee was biased, whilst the club's vice president stated that "we haven't lost against Real Madrid, but rather the referee."

== Squad ==
Note: Flags indicate national team as defined under FIFA eligibility rules; some limited exceptions apply. Players may hold more than one non-FIFA nationality.

Pos.	Nation	Player
GK	GER	Wolfgang Kleff
GK	GER	Hans-Jakob Klingen
DF	GER	Berti Vogts
DF	GER	Hans-Jürgen Wittkamp
DF	GER	Frank Schäffer
MF	GER	Dietmar Danner
DF	GER	Rainer Bonhof
DF	GER	Hans Klinkhammer
DF	GER	Wilfried Hannes
DF	GER	Ulrich Surau
DF	GER	Horst Wohlers
MF	GER	Horst Köppel

Pos.	Nation	Player
MF	GER	Herbert Wimmer
MF	GER	Uli Stielike
MF	GER	Christian Kulik
MF	GER	Hans-Jürgen Offermanns
FW	DEN	Allan Simonsen
FW	DEN	Henning Jensen
FW	GER	Jupp Heynckes
FW	GER	Karl Del'Haye
FW	GER	Norbert Ringels
FW	BEL	Roger Roebben
FW	GER	Gert Engels

== Competitions ==
=== Bundesliga ===
==== League table ====
Pos	Team	Pld	W	D	L	GF	GA	GD	Pts	Qualification or relegation
1	Borussia Mönchengladbach (C)	34	16	13	5	66	37	+29	45	Qualification to European Cup first round (Note: Bayern Munich won the 1975–76 European Cup and thereby automatically qualified as defending champions. As a consequence, their original UEFA Cup spot earned through league placement was transferred to sixth-placed Schalke 04.)
2	Hamburger SV	34	17	7	10	59	32	+27	41	Qualification to Cup Winners' Cup first round
3	Bayern Munich	34	15	10	9	72	50	+22	40	Qualification to European Cup first round
4	1. FC Köln	34	14	11	9	62	45	+17	39	Qualification to UEFA Cup first round (Note: As Hamburger SV qualified for the Cup Winners' Cup, their UEFA Cup spot was transferred to DFB-Pokal runners-up 1. FC Kaiserslautern.)
5	Eintracht Braunschweig	34	14	11	9	52	48	+4	39	Qualification to UEFA Cup first round

Source: www.dfb.de
Rules for classification: 1) points; 2) goal difference; 3) number of goals scored.
(C) Champions

==== Matches ====
Win	Draw	Loss

Bundesliga match results
Match	Date	Time	Opponent	Venue	Result F–A	Scorers	Attendance	Ref.
1	9 August 1975	15:30	Hannover 96	Away	3–3	Jensen 7', Stielike 34', Heynckes 66'	54,500	
2	16 August 1975	15:30	1. FC Kaiserslautern	Home	3–0	Riedl 36' o.g., Simonsen 72', 73'	18,000	
3	23 August 1975	15:30	Hamburger SV	Away	0–0	—	62,000	
4	26 August 1975	20:00	MSV Duisburg	Home	3–0	Simonsen 4', 62', Stielike 77'	30,000	
5	30 August 1975	15:30	Rot-Weiss Essen	Away	3–1	Wörmer 13' o.g., Jensen 30', Simnosen 55'	25,000	
6	6 September 1975	15:30	VfL Bochum	Home	1–1	Heynckes 10'	23,000	
7	13 September 1975	15:30	Eintracht Frankfurt	Away	1–1	Klinkhammer 56'	45,000	
8	20 September 1975	15:30	Bayern München	Home	4–1	Stielike 15', Simonsen 56', Danner 65', Jensen 81'	34,500	
9	27 September 1975	19:30	Hertha BSC	Away	0–3	—	45,000	
10	4 October 1975	15:30	Eintracht Braunschweig	Home	0–0	—	26,400	
11	26 October 1975	15:30	Karlsruher SC	Away	4–2	Heynckes 26', 69', Fuchs 27' o.g., Wimmer 81'	46,000	
12	31 October 1975	20:00	Werder Bremen	Home	3–0	Jensen 40', Heynckes 70', 83' pen.	18,400	
13	8 November 1975	14:30	Bayer 05 Uerdingen	Away	1–1	Simonsen 79'	23,000	
14	15 November 1975	15:30	Fortuna Düsseldorf	Home	1–0	Heynckes 72'	21,500	
15	22 November 1975	15:30	FC Schalke 04	Away	2–2	Jensen 49', 87'	70,300	
16	28 November 1975	20:00	Kickers Offenbach	Home	2–0	Simonsen 13', 48' pen.	13,000	
17	6 December 1975	15:30	1. FC Köln	Away	4–0	Simonsen 24', Heynckes 34', Jensen 37', 62'	61,118	
18	17 January 1976	15:30	Hannover 96	Home	2–0	Wimmer 29', Wesche 75' o.g.	19,200	
19	24 January 1976	15:30	1. FC Kaiserslautern	Away	3–0	Heynckes 16', Simonsen 31', Danner 84'	36,000	
20	7 February 1976	15:30	Hamburger SV	Home	1–1	Heynckes 21'	29,700	
21	14 February 1976	15:30	MSV Duisburg	Away	3–2	Simonsen 18', Bonhof 71' pen., Vogts 90'	14,000	
22	21 February 1976	15:30	Rot-Weiss Essen	Home	1–2	Wimmer 22'	15,000	
23	6 March 1976	15:30	VfL Bochum	Away	0–2	—	25,000	
24	13 March 1976	15:30	Eintracht Frankfurt	Home	4–2	Wittkamp 35', Simonsen 43', Heynckes 64', Hannes 66'	23,000	
25	20 March 1976	15:30	Bayern München	Away	0–4	—	75,000	
26	27 March 1976	15:30	Hertha BSC	Home	1–1	Heynckes 90+1'	21,200	
27	10 April 1976	15:30	Eintracht Braunschweig	Away	0–0	—	35,000	
28	17 April 1976	15:30	Karlsruher SC	Home	4–0	Wittkamp 40', Bonhof 58', Simonsen 62', Klinkhammer 74'	28,000	
29	1 May 1976	15:30	Werder Bremen	Away	2–2	Jensen 32', Bonhof 53'	33,000	
30	8 May 1976	15:30	Bayer 05 Uerdingen	Home	6–1	Simonsen 11', Stielike 24', Wittkamp 64', 75', Bonhof 73', 86'	18,000	
31	15 May 1976	15:30	Fortuna Düsseldorf	Away	1–1	Jensen 41'	36,000	
32	29 May 1976	15:30	FC Schalke 04	Home	0–2	—	32,000	
33	4 June 1976	15:30	Kickers Offenbach	Away	1–1	Simonsen 81'	30,000	
34	12 June 1976	15:30	1. FC Köln	Home	2–1	Jensen 6', Wittkamp 35'	30,000	

=== DFB-Pokal ===
Win	Draw	Loss

DFB-Pokal match results
Round	Date	Opponent	Venue	Result F–A	Scorers	Attendance	Ref.
First round	2 August 1975	Werder Bremen	Away	3–0	Jensen 8', Assauer 34' o.g., Wimmer 50'	22,000	
Second round	18 October 1975	Rot-Weiß Hasborn	Home	3–0	Heynckes 59', Danner 64', Simonsen 66'	5,000	
Third round	12 December 1975	MSV Duisburg	Away	1–0	Vogts 40'	31,000	
Round of 16	31 January 1976	Fortuna Düsseldorf	Away	2–3	Jensen 55', Bonhof 86' pen.	60,000	

=== European Cup ===
Win	Draw	Loss

European Cup match results
Round	Date	Opponent	Venue	Result F–A	Scorers	Attendance	Ref.
First round	17 September 1975	SSW Innsbruck	Home	1–1	Simonsen 83' pen.	18,636	
First round	1 October 1975	SSW Innsbruck	Away	6–1	Stielicke 44', Simonsen 63', Heynckes 64', 68', 75', 88'	18,384	
Round of 16	22 October 1975	Juventus	Home	2–0	Heynckes 26', Simonsen 36'	57,195	
Round of 16	5 November 1975	Juventus	Away	2–2	Danner 69', Simonsen 87'	62,773	
Quarter-finals	3 March 1976	Real Madrid	Home	2–2	Jensen 2', Wittkamp 27'	67,069	
Quarter-finals	17 March 1976	Real Madrid	Away	1–1	Heynckes 26'	85,956	
