= Uwe Tschiskale =

German footballer

Personal information
- Date of birth: 9 July 1962 (age 64)
- Height: 1.84 m (6 ft 0 in)
- Position: Striker

Youth career
- DJK Eintracht Coesfeld
- –1980: ASC Schöppingen

Senior career*
Years	Team	Apps	(Gls)
1980–1984	ASC Schöppingen		
1984–1985	SC Preußen Münster		
1985–1987	SG Wattenscheid 09	72	(38)
1987	FC Bayern Munich	1	(0)
1988	FC Schalke 04	16	(4)
1988–1993	SG Wattenscheid 09	156	(55)
1993–1995	SC Preußen Münster	38	(10)
- * Club domestic league appearances and goals

Uwe Tschiskale (born 9 July 1962) is a German former footballer who played as a striker for SG Wattenscheid 09, playing 228 games and scoring 93 goals for the club.

== Honours ==
- Bundesliga runner-up: 1987–88
