= Jupp Heynckes =

German football player and manager (born 1945)

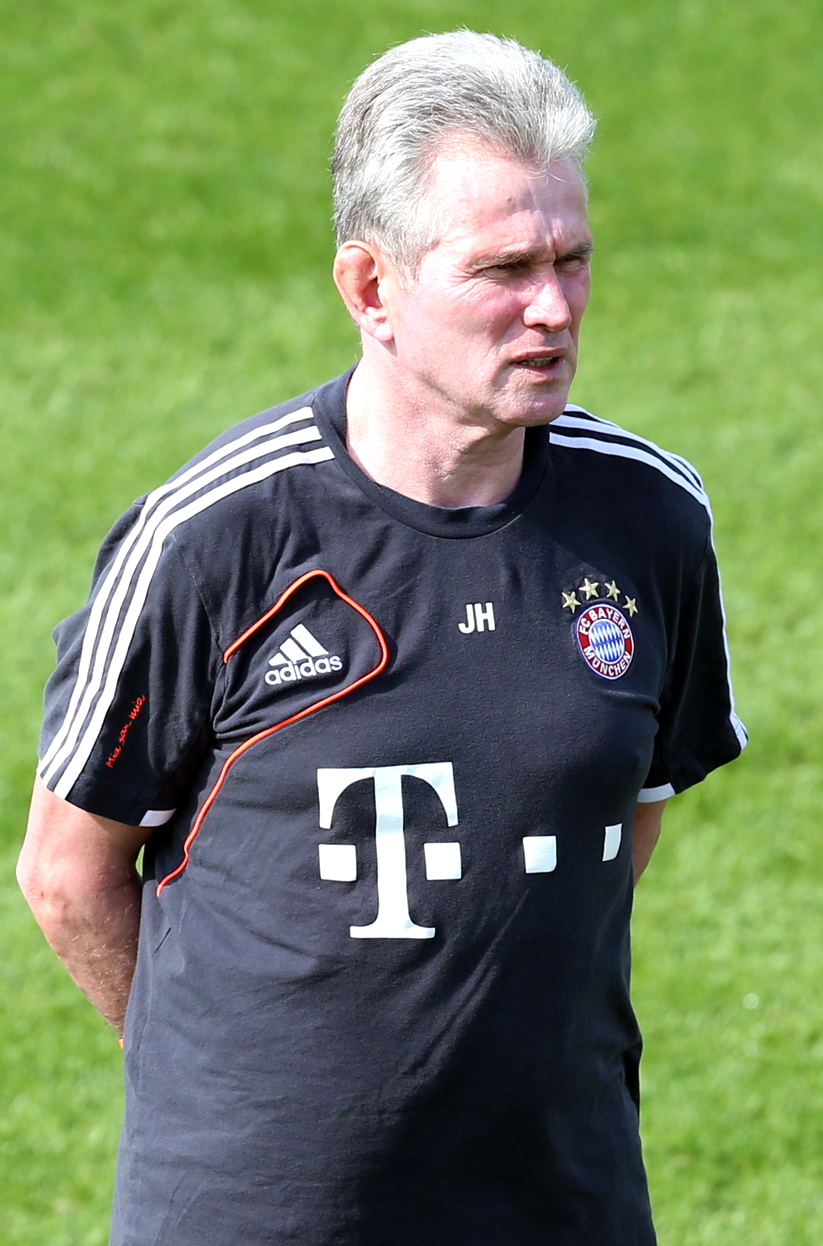
- Heynckes with Bayern Munich in 2013

Personal information
- Full name: Josef Heynckes
- Date of birth: 9 May 1945 (age 81)
- Place of birth: Mönchengladbach, Germany
- Height: 1.80 m (5 ft 11 in)
- Position: Forward

Youth career
- 1956–1962: Grün-Weiß Holt
- 1962–1964: Borussia Mönchengladbach

Senior career*
Years	Team	Apps	(Gls)
1963–1967	Borussia Mönchengladbach	82	(50)
1967–1970	Hannover 96	112	(41)
1970–1978	Borussia Mönchengladbach	226	(168)
Total		420	(259)

International career
1966–1967	West Germany U23	3	(1)
1967–1976	West Germany	39	(14)

Managerial career
- 1979–1987: Borussia Mönchengladbach
- 1987–1991: Bayern Munich
- 1992–1994: Athletic Bilbao
- 1994–1995: Eintracht Frankfurt
- 1995–1997: Tenerife
- 1997–1998: Real Madrid
- 1999–2000: Benfica
- 2001–2003: Athletic Bilbao
- 2003–2004: Schalke 04
- 2006–2007: Borussia Mönchengladbach
- 2009: Bayern Munich (caretaker)
- 2009–2011: Bayer Leverkusen
- 2011–2013: Bayern Munich
- 2017–2018: Bayern Munich
Medal record
Men's football
Representing West Germany
FIFA World Cup
Winner	1974
UEFA European Championship
Winner	1972
- * Club domestic league appearances and goals

Josef "Jupp" Heynckes (German: [ˈjʊp ˈhaɪnkəs]; born 9 May 1945) is a German retired professional footballer and manager. For the majority of his playing career he was as a striker for Borussia Mönchengladbach in its golden era of the 1960s and '70s, when they won many national championships and the DFB-Pokal, as well as the UEFA Cup. During this period the team played in its only European Cup final in 1977, losing to Liverpool. He is the fourth-highest goalscorer in the history of the Bundesliga, with 220 goals. He was a member of the West Germany national team that won the UEFA Euro 1972 and the 1974 FIFA World Cup titles.

As manager, Heynckes won four Bundesliga titles with Bayern Munich and two UEFA Champions Leagues; with Real Madrid in 1997–98 and Bayern in 2012–13, the latter of which was part of a continental treble. He is widely regarded as one of the greatest managers of all time.

== Early life ==
Josef Heynckes was born 9 May 1945 in Mönchengladbach.

== Playing career ==
=== Club level ===
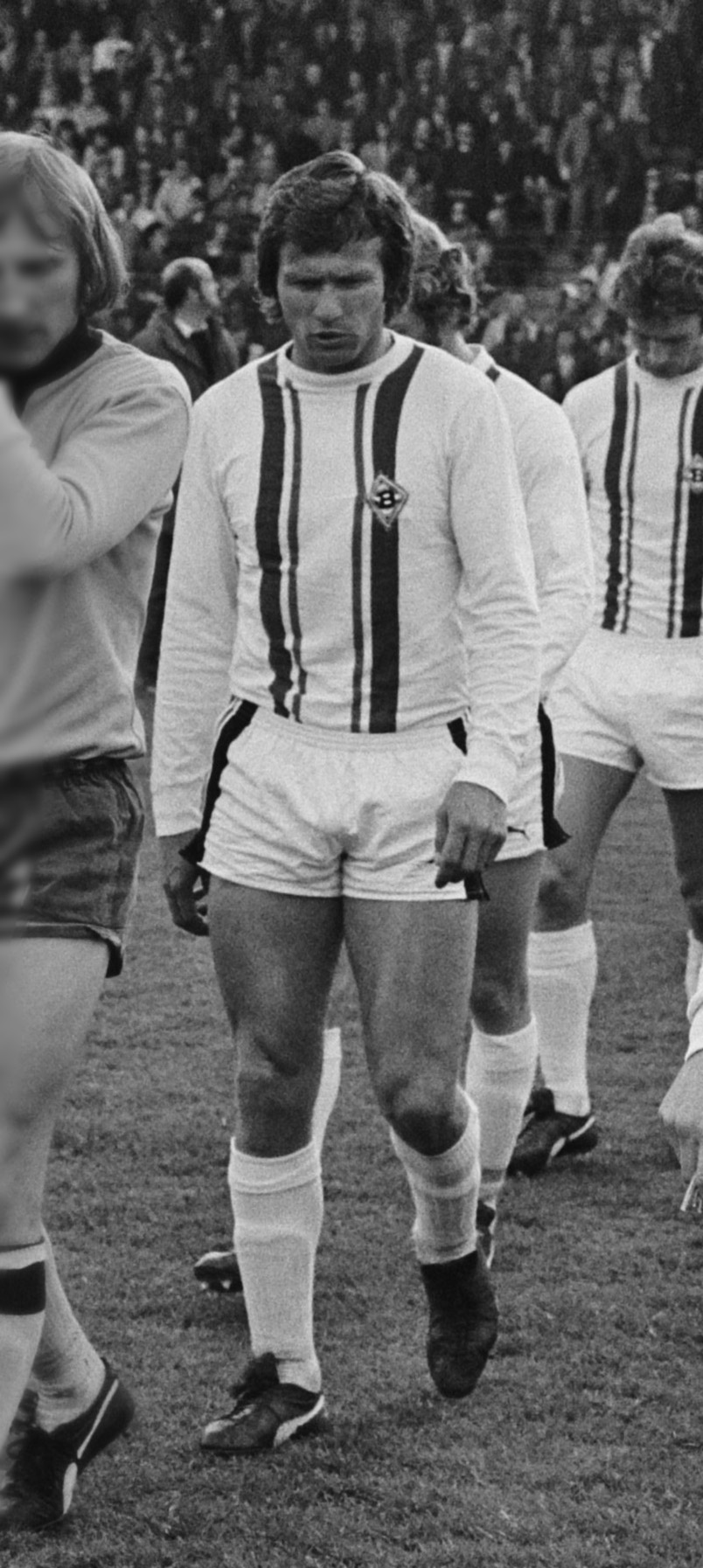
Heynckes with Mönchengladbach in 1975

Heynckes played 369 matches in the German Bundesliga, scoring 220 goals. His tally is the fourth highest in this league, after Gerd Müller's 365 goals, Robert Lewandowski's 312, and Klaus Fischer's 268.

After playing for amateur club Grün-Weiß Holt as a youth, Heynckes started his professional career in 1964 with his hometown club Borussia Mönchengladbach who were then in the second division. In 1965, the club, managed by Hennes Weisweiler, achieved promotion to the Bundesliga, with the teenaged striker scoring 23 goals in 25 matches in his debut season.

In August 1965, Heynckes scored his first two Bundesliga goals against SC Tasmania 1900 Berlin. He scored 27 Bundesliga goals in two seasons for Borussia before joining Hannover 96, where he spent three years and scored 25 times in 86 league matches.

He returned to Mönchengladbach in 1970, with the club having just won the first league title in its history. With Heynckes, who scored 19 times in 33 matches, Gladbach became the first club to retain the Bundesliga title in 1970–71.

In the 1971–72 European Cup, Heynckes scored twice in an extraordinary 7–1 win against Italian champions Inter Milan. The match, however, was forced to be replayed after a drinks can had been thrown onto the pitch by a spectator, hitting Inter's Roberto Boninsegna. Borussia drew the replayed home leg 0–0 and were eliminated 4–2 on aggregate.

In 1973, after eliminating Dutch club Twente 5–1 on aggregate in the semi-finals, Borussia Mönchengladbach became the first German side to reach the final of the UEFA Cup. Borussia lost the away leg of the final against Liverpool 3–0 at Anfield, after the match initially had to be abandoned after 27 minutes due to a waterlogged pitch. During the match, Heynckes had a penalty kick saved by Ray Clemence, denying his side a decisive away goal. In the return leg, Heynckes scored both goals in Gladbach's 2–0 win. The English team, however, prevailed 3–2 on aggregate to lift the trophy. With 12 goals, Heynckes was joint top scorer of the competition with Twente's Jan Jeuring. Despite disappointment in Europe, Gladbach ended the 1972–73 season with success in the DFB-Pokal final, beating 1. FC Köln at the Rheinstadion in Düsseldorf.

In the 1973–74 season, Heynckes was joint top goalscorer in the Bundesliga, alongside Gerd Müller, with 30 goals. His Mönchengladbach side finished second in the table, with Müller's Bayern Munich winning a record third consecutive Bundesliga title. Heynckes was also the top scorer of the 1973–74 European Cup Winners' Cup with eight goals. In this competition, Borussia Mönchengladbach were knocked out in the semi-finals by Milan, losing 2–1 on aggregate.

In 1974–75, die Fohlen won their third Bundesliga title, with Heynckes finishing as the league's outright top goalscorer with 27 goals. The club also won its first European trophy with success in the UEFA Cup. After a 0–0 draw in the home leg of the final against Twente, Heynckes, who missed the home match, scored a hat-trick in a 5–1 away win in Enschede. This victory made Gladbach the first German winners of the UEFA Cup. Again, Heynckes was tournament top scorer, this time with ten goals. Altogether, Heynckes scored 23 goals in 21 games in the UEFA Cup, making him the ninth-highest goalscorer in the history of the competition, and the only member of the top ten to have scored at a ratio of over a goal per game.

After regaining the title, Weisweiler left Borussia to become manager of Barcelona. He was replaced by Udo Lattek, under whom Heynckes would later begin his coaching career. Borussia Mönchengladbach went on to win the 1975–76 and 1976–77 Bundesliga titles, matching Bayern's feat of three titles in a row set earlier in the decade. In 1977, Borussia also reached its first European Cup final. In the previous season's competition, Heynckes had been top scorer with six goals. In 1976–77 European Cup, he was less prolific, scoring only one goal in the first round match against Austria Wien. In the final, Gladbach again lost out to Liverpool, losing 3–1 at Rome's Stadio Olimpico.

Heynckes scored 18 goals in the 1977–78 Bundesliga season, including five in the record 12–0 win against Borussia Dortmund on the final day of the season. However, this was not enough to secure a fourth successive title, as 1. FC Köln won their final match against FC St. Pauli 5–0 to take first place on goal difference. Heynckes scored four goals in the 1977–78 European Cup as the team reached the semi-finals, where they were again defeated by Liverpool. Altogether, Heynckes scored 51 goals in 64 matches in European club competitions. His average of 0.8 goals per match is only bettered by compatriot Gerd Müller, who achieved an average of 0.89 goals per match.

Heynckes ended his playing career in 1978 and began studying for his coaching licence at the Deutsche Sporthochschule Köln. During his club career, he won four Bundesliga titles, one DFB-Pokal and one UEFA Cup. He is the fourth-highest goalscorer in Bundesliga history and Borussia Mönchengladbach's top goalscorer in the competition with 195 goals.

=== International level ===
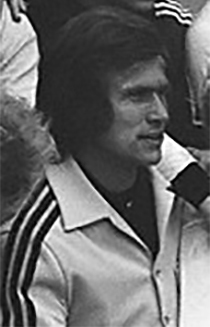
Heynckes with West Germany in 1974

Heynckes made 39 appearances for the West Germany national team and scored 14 goals.

In February 1967, he made his international debut at age 21, scoring in a 5–1 friendly win against Morocco.

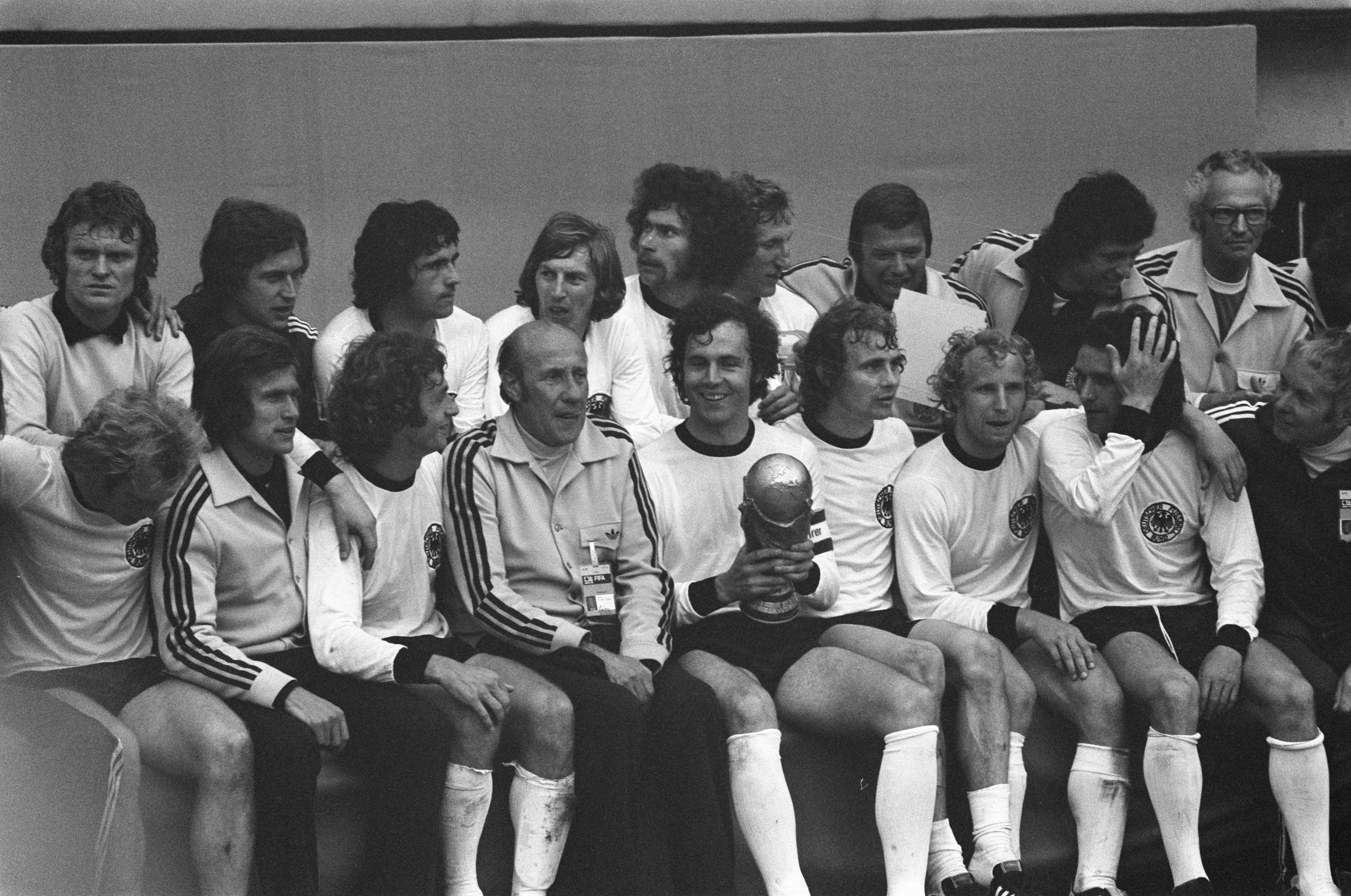
Heynckes (bottom, second left) with his teammates after winning the 1974 FIFA World Cup on 7 July

Heynckes was a member of the West Germany team that won the 1972 UEFA European Championship, playing 90 minutes in the 3–0 win over the Soviet Union in the final. He was named by UEFA as one of seven German players in the official Team of the Tournament.

Heynckes was included in West Germany's squad for the 1974 FIFA World Cup, which was held in West Germany. Despite his excellent form at club level, however, he spent most of the tournament on the bench as Gerd Müller, the national team's all-time top goalscorer, was used as the starting centre forward by coach Helmut Schön. Heynckes was in the starting line-up for West Germany's opening two fixtures against Chile and Australia but then played no further part due to injury and die Nationalelf won their second World Cup, beating the Netherlands 2–1 in the final at Munich's Olympiastadion. In 2013, Heynckes said of his experience at the 1974 World Cup, "I was in the starting lineup for the Germany national team competing for the World Cup, but after an injury I was sidelined for the entire final. This was the greatest disappointment of my life, but it spurred me on and became my greatest source of motivation."

== Managerial career ==
=== 1979–91: Early career ===
==== Borussia Mönchengladbach ====
After his playing career, Heynckes stayed with Borussia Mönchengladbach and served the club for eight more years, first as an assistant and then as a manager, succeeding Udo Lattek in this position in 1979 at age 34. Heynckes took over on 1 July 1979 and in the 1979–80 season, Heynckes led Mönchengladbach to the 1980 UEFA Cup final, where they lost to Eintracht Frankfurt. They won the first leg 3–2 and lost the second leg 1–0. in the league, Mönchengladbach finished in seventh place.

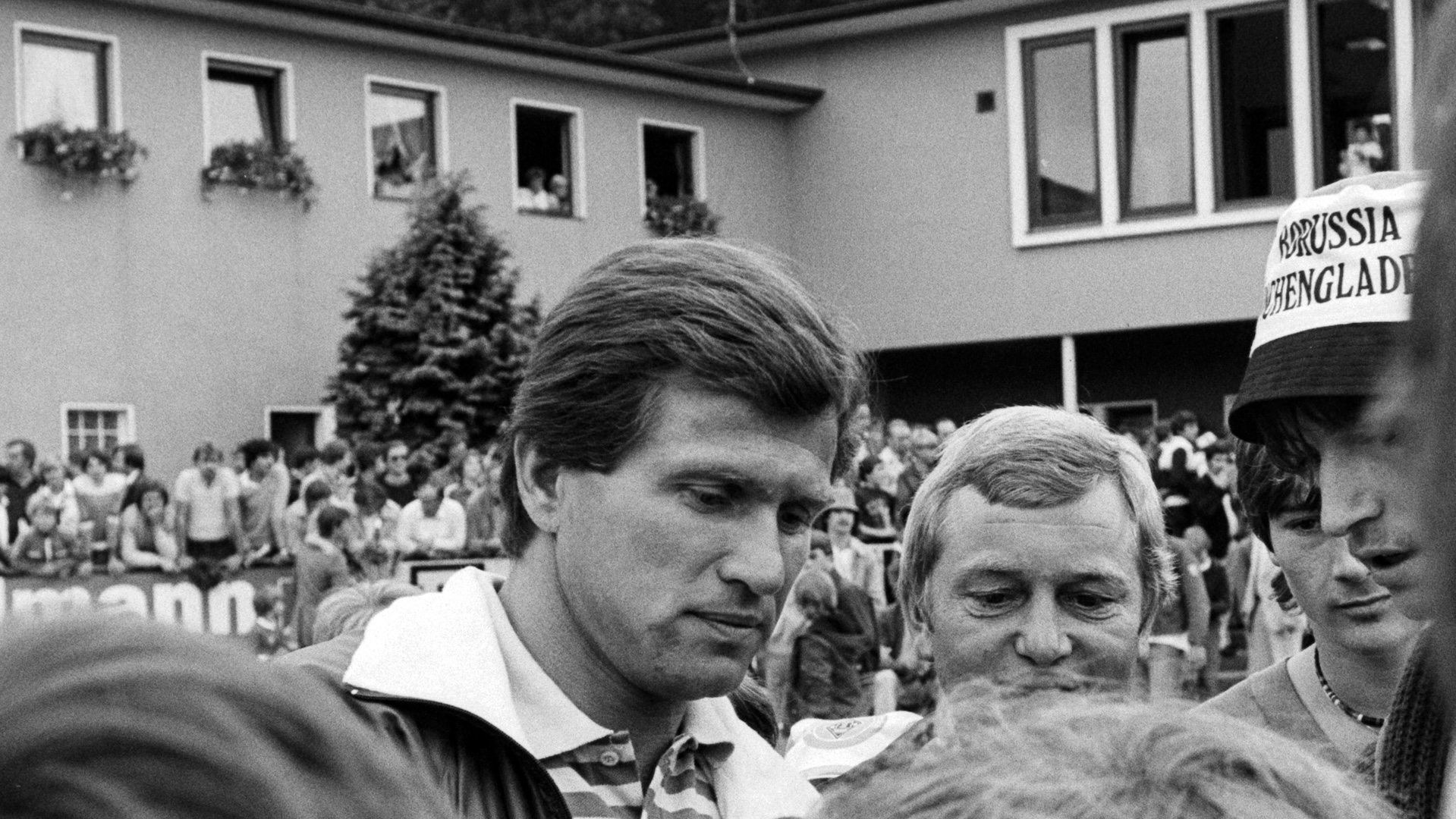
Heynckes meeting Mönchengladbach supporters in 1981

The 1980–81 season started with a 2–1 loss to Fortuna Düsseldorf. During the 1980–81 season, Mönchengladbach defeated OSV Hannover, TuS Langerwehe, Bünder SV, and Atlas Delmenhorst to get to the quarter-final of the DFB-Pokal where they lost to 1. FC Kaiserslautern. Their seventh-place finish in the previous season failed to qualify them for a place in Europe. Mönchengladbach finished the league season in sixth place.

The 1981–82 season started with a 4–2 loss to Werder Bremen on 8 August 1981. Then they went on a six-match undefeated streak. This included a 7–2 win against SSV Dillenburg in the DFB-Pokal. Again they reached the quarter-final of the DFB-Pokal. This time they were knocked out by 1. FC Nürnberg. They finished the league season in seventh place. They were knocked out of the UEFA Cup in the second round by Dundee United. They had knocked out 1. FC Magdeburg in the first round.

Mönchengladbach finished the 1982–83 season in 12th place. For the third consecutive season, Mönchengladbach was eliminated in the quarter-final of the DFB-Pokal.

In the 1983–84 season, Die Fohlen finished third in the Bundesliga, missing out on the league title to VfB Stuttgart on goal difference. The team also reached the DFB-Pokal final, losing to Bayern Munich on penalties.

Mönchengladbach finished the 1984–85 season in fourth place. They were eliminated in the second round of the UEFA Cup by Widzew Łódź and in the semi-final of the DFB-Pokal by Bayern Munich.

Mönchengladbach finished the 1985–86 season in fourth place in the league. In the third-round of the UEFA Cup, Gladbach beat Real Madrid 5–1 at the Rheinstadion. However, a 4–0 loss at the Santiago Bernabéu Stadium in the second leg saw Borussia eliminated on the away goals rule. In 2013, Heynckes described it as "the worst night of my career".

In his final season in charge, Heynckes led Mönchengladbach to another third-place finish and the UEFA Cup semi-final. Despite not winning a trophy during his spell as manager of his hometown club, a record that earned him the nickname "the champion without a title", he was appointed as manager of Bayern Munich in the summer of 1987, where he again succeeded the outgoing Udo Lattek.

Heynckes finished with a record of 169 wins, 77 draws and 97 losses.

==== Bayern Munich ====
Heynckes was manager of Bayern Munich between 1 July 1987 and 8 October 1991. In his first season, Bayern won the DFB-Supercup. Bayern defeated Hamburger SV 2–1. During the season, Bayern went on to lose out on the league title by four points to Werder Bremen and were eliminated in the quarter-finals of the DFB-Pokal and the European Cup.

Bayern won back-to-back titles in 1988–89 and 1989–90 seasons. In the 1988–89 season, Bayern were eliminated in the round of 16 in the DFB-Pokal and the semi-final in the UEFA Cup. Bayern started the 1989–90 season with a 4–3 loss to Borussia Dortmund in the DFB-Supercup on 25 July 1989. Then they defeated 1. FC Nürnberg 3–2 on matchday one on 29 July 1989. They were knocked out of the DFB-Pokal in the round of 16 and they were knocked out once again in the semi-final of the European Cup. This time by Milan.

Bayern started the 1990–91 season by defeating 1. FC Kaiserslautern 4–1 in the DFB-Supercup on 31 July 1990. Then they were eliminated in the first round of the German Cup on 4 August 1990. In the European Cup Bayern were knocked out of a European semi-final for the third time in a row. This time by Red Star Belgrade. The club then achieved another second-placed finish in 1990–91 league season.

Bayern started the 1991–92 season with a 1–1 draw against Werder Bremen. Bayern advanced to the second round of the UEFA Cup after eliminating Cork City. The first leg finished in a 1–1 draw and the second leg finished in a 2–0 win for Bayern. Heynckes was fired by Bayern on 4 October 1991, after the team had won only four of its first 12 Bundesliga matches. His final match as coach was a 4–1 home defeat to Stuttgarter Kickers. Bayern were in 12th place at the time of his sacking. The team continued to struggle after his departure, eventually finishing five points clear of relegation in tenth place. The decision to sack Heynckes was later described by general manager Uli Hoeneß as "the biggest mistake of my career".

Under Heynckes, Bayern reached the semi-finals of the 1988–89 UEFA Cup, the 1989–90 European Cup and the 1990–91 European Cup. In each campaign, they were knocked out by the team which went on to win the competition.

Heynckes finished with a record of 113 wins, 46 draws and 39 losses.

=== 1992–98: Coaching in Spain and return to Bundesliga ===
==== Athletic Bilbao ====
In 1992, he was appointed manager of Athletic Bilbao, becoming only the third German manager in Spain's La Liga after Hennes Weisweiler and Udo Lattek, both of whom managed Barcelona. Heynckes managed his first match against Cádiz on 5 September 1992. He led them to an eighth-placed finish in his first season. They were eliminated in the third round of Copa del Rey.

He led the Basque club to fifth spot in the league and qualification for the UEFA Cup in 1993–94. They were eliminated in the fourth round of the Copa del Rey. His final match was a 3–2 win against Tenerife.

==== Eintracht Frankfurt ====
On 1 July 1994, Heynckes returned to Germany to become manager of Eintracht Frankfurt and was manager until 2 April 1995. His first match was a 6–0 win against I. SC Göttingen 05 in the first round of the German Cup.

Heynckes' spell at the Eintracht was problematic and he clashed with the club's star players Tony Yeboah, Jay-Jay Okocha and Maurizio Gaudino. In December 1994, the three players were punished for a perceived lack of effort with extra training sessions. Because of this the players refused to play in Eintracht's next match against Hamburger SV and were suspended indefinitely by the club. Gaudino was loaned out to Manchester City later in the month and Yeboah was sold to Leeds United in January 1995. Okocha was later allowed to return to the team before leaving for Fenerbahçe in 1996. Heynckes left the club on 2 April 1995 after a 3–0 home defeat to Schalke 04 with the team in 13th place in the table. Heynckes finished with a record of 12 wins, 10 draws and 12 losses.

==== Tenerife and Real Madrid ====
In 1995, Heynckes returned to Spain to take over at Tenerife. He won his first match as manager against Sevilla on 2 September 1995. In his first season, he led the team from the Canary Islands into the UEFA Cup with a fifth-placed finish in La Liga. In the Copa del Rey, they got to the quarter-finals where they lost to Atlético Madrid. The following season the club finished ninth in La Liga and reached the semi-finals of the UEFA Cup, where they were beaten by eventual winners Schalke 04. In the Copa del Rey, Tenerife had a bye until the fourth round, where they were eliminated by Real Betis after losing both legs of the tie.

In June 1997, Heynckes was hired by the Spanish champions Real Madrid. His first match was a 2–1 loss to Barcelona in the first leg of the Spanish Super Cup. Real Madrid would go on to win the Super Cup after winning the second leg 4–1. Real Madrid were knocked out of the Copa del Rey in the round of 16. There, he celebrated one of his greatest triumphs, as Madrid beat Juventus 1–0 in the UEFA Champions League Final for their first European Cup victory since 1966. However, the lack of domestic success – finishing fourth, eleven points behind champions Barcelona – saw his tenure terminated at the end of the season.

=== 1999–2003: Benfica and return to Athletic ===
After his dismissal by Real Madrid, Heynckes took a year out of football before joining Portuguese club Benfica for the 1999–2000 season. Heynckes replaced Graeme Souness. Benfica finished third in Heynckes' only full season in charge and were knocked out of the UEFA Cup at the third round with an 8–1 aggregate defeat by Celta Vigo, losing the first leg 7–0. They were knocked out in the round of 16 of the Portuguese Cup.
After releasing club icon and captain João Pinto, who then joined Lisbon rivals Sporting CP, after transfer listing him. Heynckes became unpopular with the Benfica fans and left the club by mutual agreement in September 2000. His final match at the club was a 2–1 win against Estrela Amadora on 17 September 2000. Benfica were tied for seventh place at the time of his departure.

In 2001, Heynckes returned to Athletic Bilbao for a second spell as coach. In the 2001–02 season, Athletic finished tenth in La Liga, missing out on qualification to the UEFA Cup by a point, and reached the semi-finals of the Copa del Rey. The following season, Athletic secured a seventh-place finish, again finishing one point short of UEFA Cup qualification. They were eliminated in the second round of the Copa del Rey. In June 2003, Heynckes left Athletic to become head coach of Schalke 04.

=== 2003–07: Return to the Bundesliga ===
==== Schalke ====
In 2003, after eight years managing in Iberia, Heynckes returned to Germany to manage Schalke 04. Upon joining die Königsblauen Heynckes said: "Schalke is something special, for many it is like a religion, for me it is an absolutely ideal position." His first match was a 1–0 win against Dacia Chișinău on 19 July 2003 in the Intertoto Cup. His first league match was a 2–2 draw against Borussia Dortmund on 2 August 2003. Despite targeting a top five finish upon his appointment, Schalke were eliminated in the second round of the German Cup by SC Freiburg. Freiburg won 7–3 and scored four goals in extra time. Schalke finished the 2003–04 season in seventh place in the Bundesliga.

Schalke started 2004–05 season with a 5–0 win against Vardar on 17 July 2004 in the Intertoto Cup. Schalke defeated Hertha BSC II in the first round of the DFB-Pokal. Schalke started the league season in the relegation zone after losing three of their opening four league matches. On 15 September 2004, Heynckes was fired by the club's general manager Rudi Assauer. Heynckes finished with a record of 28 wins, 14 draws and 15 losses.

==== Borussia Mönchengladbach ====
In May 2006, Heynckes returned to manage Borussia Mönchengladbach, the club where he had begun his career as both a player and manager.

Heynckes' first match was a 2–0 win against Energie Cottbus on 12 August 2006. Heynckes' comeback started well, with Gladbach in fifth position in the Bundesliga at the end of the seventh matchday after winning each of their opening four home matches. He resigned on 31 January 2007, however, after 14-straight Bundesliga matches without a win saw Borussia drop to 17th place in the table. with the coach requiring police protection for matches against VfL Bochum and Energie Cottbus in the previous month. On departing Borussia, Heynckes refused a pay-off and returned his company car to the club office freshly cleaned and with a full tank of petrol. In May 2013, upon returning to Borussia-Park for his originally final match as a Bundesliga coach, Heynckes said: "This is my club. It's where I started as a 19-year-old professional, then worked as a coach. Since then I have come full circle. Mönchengladbach is my home town, I spent 23 years at the club, so this will not be just a normal game for me."

The team's fortunes did not improve after Heynckes' departure and the club was relegated at the end of the season, finishing last in the Bundesliga table.

Heynckes finished with a record of five wins, four draws and 12 losses.

=== 2009–13: Final years ===
==== Caretaker role at Bayern Munich ====
After over two years out of football, Heynckes came out of retirement and returned to football in April 2009, becoming caretaker manager of his former club Bayern Munich, replacing the sacked Jürgen Klinsmann. Bayern were in danger of missing out on qualification for the Champions League upon Heynckes' appointment, but the team won four and drew one of its remaining matches, finishing second in the Bundesliga, two points behind champions VfL Wolfsburg.

The four Bayern wins were against Borussia Mönchengladbach, Energie Cottbus, Bayer Leverkusen, and VfB Stuttgart. The draw was against 1899 Hoffenheim.

==== Bayer Leverkusen ====
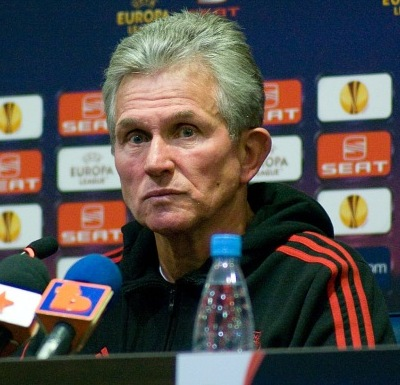
Heynckes with Bayer Leverkusen in 2011

On 5 June 2009, Heynckes signed a two-year contract to manage Bayer Leverkusen. Heynckes' first match was a 1–0 German Cup win against SV Babelsberg 03 on 31 July 2009. Bayer Leverkusen were eventually eliminated by Kaiserslautern in the second round. The team started the season with a record 24 Bundesliga matches unbeaten, challenging Bayern Munich for the league title. The team's unbeaten record finally came to an end in March 2010 with a 3–2 defeat at 1. FC Nürnberg, after which Leverkusen only won two of their final nine matches and finished in fourth place.

In the 2010–11 season, Leverkusen finished runner-up in the Bundesliga to Borussia Dortmund, thus qualifying for the Champions League for the first time since 2005. It was also the club's highest final league position since the 2001–02 season. They were knocked out in the second round of the DFB-Pokal for the second consecutive season. They also reached the round of 16 in the Europa League.

Despite his success, Heynckes decided not to extend his contract and left Bayer Leverkusen in the 2011 close season to take over at Bayern Munich for a third time.

On 25 March 2011, it was announced that Heynckes would be replacing Louis van Gaal as the manager of Bayern Munich at the beginning of the 2011–12 season. At the age of 66, he was the oldest coach in the Bundesliga. Heynckes took over a team which had finished third in the 2010–11 Bundesliga, three points behind his Bayer Leverkusen side. He finished with a record of 44 wins, 26 draws and 14 losses at Bayer Leverkusen.

==== 2011–13: Third stint at Bayern Munich ====
===== 2011–12 season =====
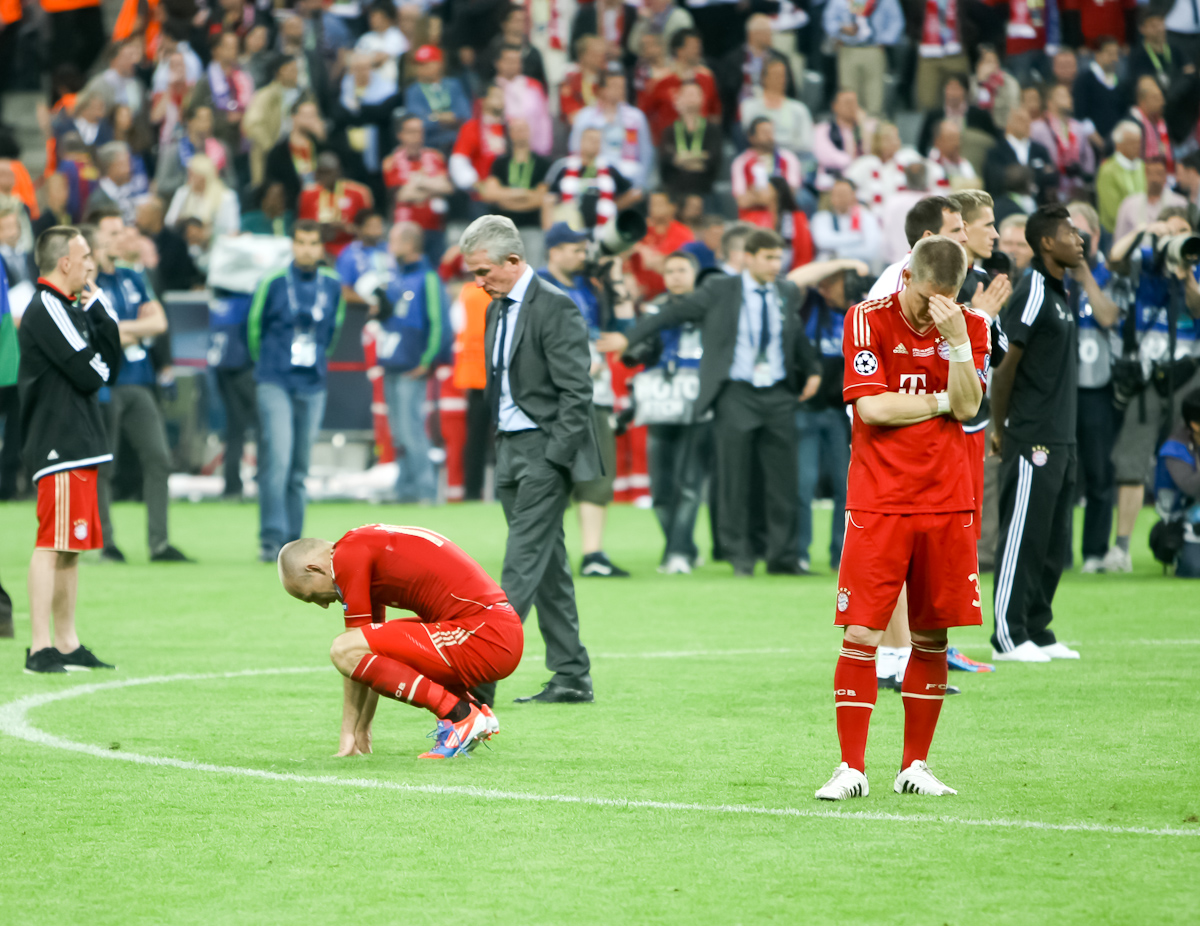
Heynckes after the 2012 UEFA Champions League Final loss to Chelsea

Heynckes' first match was a 3–0 win against Eintracht Braunschweig in the first round of the 2011–12 DFB-Pokal. Bayern started the league season with a surprise 1–0 defeat to Heynckes' former club Borussia Mönchengladbach at the Allianz Arena, before six consecutive Bundesliga wins without conceding took them to the top of the table. In all competitions, Bayern kept 12 consecutive clean sheets, including four Champions League matches, the last of which came in a 4–0 win over Hertha BSC. This run of good form ended with a 2–1 defeat to Hannover 96, and losses to Borussia Dortmund and Mainz 05 soon followed, allowing Dortmund, the previous season's champions, to overtake Bayern at the top of the table. Bayern briefly regained top spot in January and February, but after the Bavarians' draw with Hamburger SV on matchday 20, Dortmund again gained first position and went on to retain their title by eight points, ending the season on a 28-match unbeaten run.

On 17 March 2012, Heynckes oversaw his 600th Bundesliga match as manager, a 6–0 victory over Hertha BSC. His opposing coach that day, Otto Rehhagel, is the only coach who has managed more Bundesliga matches, with over 800.

After finishing the Bundesliga season in second place, Bayern faced champions Dortmund in the 2012 DFB-Pokal final, losing 5–2.

Despite their disappointments in domestic competitions, Heynckes' Bayern had qualified for the 2012 Champions League Final in April 2012, defeating Real Madrid on penalty kicks in the semi-finals. In the final, held at the Allianz Arena, die Roten faced English club Chelsea. Despite controlling most of the match and taking a 1–0 lead in the 83rd minute, Bayern lost the match 4–3 on penalties. This meant that Bayern had finished as runners-up in all three major competitions in which they had competed in 2011–12.

===== 2012–13 season =====
Bayern started the 2012–13 season by defeating Borussia Dortmund 2–1 in the DFL-Supercup. It was a significant result as the Bavarians had lost all three encounters with die Schwarzgelben in the previous season, and the last five encounters between the clubs overall. Bayern's Bundesliga campaign began with a record-breaking eight consecutive wins before they suffered their only league defeat of the season at Bayer Leverkusen. Bayern quickly regained form and went into the winter break nine points clear at the top of the table.

On 16 January 2013, Bayern announced that former Barcelona coach Pep Guardiola would replace Heynckes in July 2013. General manager Uli Hoeneß later stated that it was not Heynckes' decision to leave Bayern at the end of the season and was forced by the club's wish to appoint Guardiola. Though the club's press release announcing Bayern's agreement with Guardiola had claimed Heynckes would be retiring on the expiration of his contract, he stated he would not make a decision on his future until the end of the season.

After returning from the winter break, Bayern only dropped two points in the entire second half of the Bundesliga season, winning 14 consecutive matches from January onwards and being confirmed as champions on 6 April 2013. This was the earliest a team had ever won the Bundesliga, and Bayern broke several other records during the season including; most points in a season (91), highest league winning points margin (25), most wins in a season (29), longest winning streak in a season (14), most clean sheets in a season (21), best goal difference in a season (+80) and fewest goals conceded in a season (18). The team scored in every match and suffered only one defeat.

On 23 February 2013, Heynckes participated in his 1,000th Bundesliga match as player and manager combined, making him the man with the second most appearances in Bundesliga history. On 14 May 2013, he took charge of a Bundesliga match for what he claimed to be the final time. Fittingly, the match was away at Borussia Mönchengladbach, Heynckes' hometown club who he served for over 20 years as a player and coach.

In the Champions League, Bayern faced Barcelona at the semi-final stage, thrashing the favourites 7–0 on aggregate to reach a second successive final. The performance was seen as a display of physical and tactical superiority of Bayern over Barcelona. In the 2013 Champions League final, Heynckes' Bayern defeated Bundesliga rivals Borussia Dortmund 2–1 at Wembley, making him the fourth manager (after Ernst Happel, Ottmar Hitzfeld, and José Mourinho) to win the competition with two clubs.

On 1 June 2013, Heynckes took charge of Bayern for the last time in the 2013 DFB-Pokal final against VfB Stuttgart. Bayern won the match 3–2, becoming the first German club to complete the treble of the domestic league, the domestic cup and the European Cup. Former Bayern and West Germany captain Franz Beckenbauer, who led die Roten to three consecutive European Cup wins in the 1970s, called Heynckes' 2012–13 side "the best Bayern team ever", a view shared by the club's legendary forward Karl-Heinz Rummenigge. He finished with a record of 83 wins, 12 draws, and 14 losses.

Consequently, he won the FIFA World Coach of the Year 2013 finishing ahead of Jürgen Klopp (second) and Sir Alex Ferguson (third).

On 4 June 2013, Heynckes announced he would not coach a team during the 2013–14 season. On 21 June, in an interview with Der Spiegel, Heynckes said: "After everything that's happened over the past two years, I'm ready for some peace and quiet. After this string of successes, I could transfer to just about any club in Europe. I have a problem with the finality of saying 'never'. But I can assure you that I have no intention of coaching again. I had a worthy ending." He was replaced by Pep Guardiola, who had his first training session on 26 June 2013.

=== 2017–18: Return to management ===
==== Fourth stint at Bayern ====
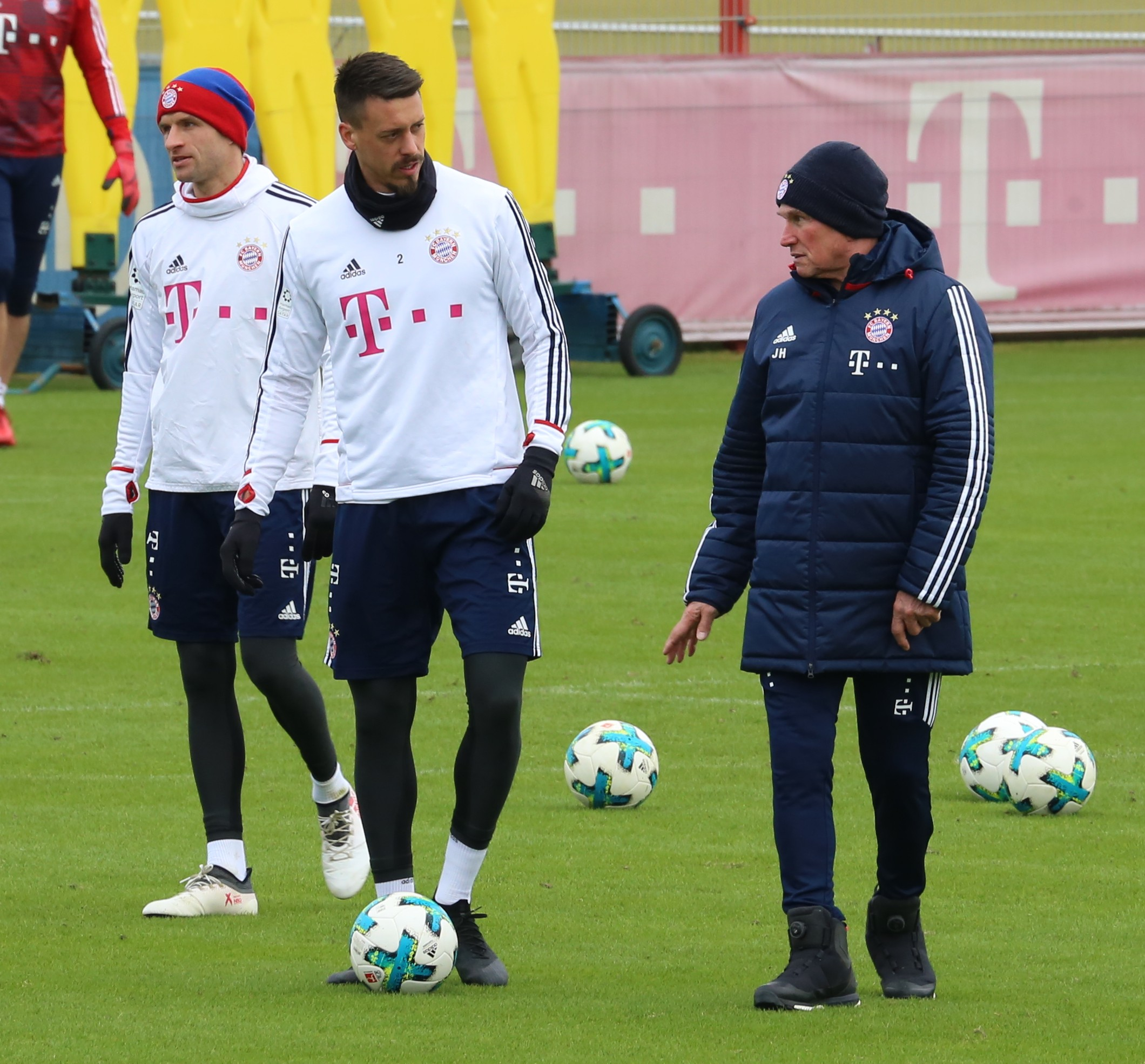
Heynckes coaching Bayern Munich in 2018

On 6 October 2017, Heynckes was appointed Bayern Munich manager until the end of the 2017–18 season. Carlo Ancelotti was dismissed and Willy Sagnol managed the team on 1 October against Hertha BSC. Heynckes officially took the role on 9 October. His first match in his fourth stint was a 5–0 win against Freiburg.

On 4 April 2018, Heynckes set a new Champions League record of most consecutive wins as a manager with twelve wins by defeating Sevilla in the quarter-final 1st leg match in 2017–18 UEFA Champions League, surpassing the record of ten wins in a row set by Louis van Gaal and Carlo Ancelotti.

Bayern president Uli Hoeneß said numerous times in interviews that he wanted Heynckes to stay as manager for the 2018–19 season. Heynckes said in an interview with Sport Bild that he was only going to manage Bayern until the end of the season.

Heynckes managed Bayern in 26 Bundesliga matches. He won 22, lost three and one match ended with a draw. In the Champions League, Heynckes was in charge of ten matches. He won seven, lost one and two matches ended with a draw. His only defeat was against his old club, Real Madrid, in the first leg in the semi-finals.

==== Retirement ====
Heynckes retired at the end of the 2017–18 season. In his career, Heynckes managed 1,265 matches in all competitions and in three leagues. He managed 668 Bundesliga matches with five clubs, won 343, lost 164 and drew 161 matches. Heynckes managed 200 La Liga matches with three clubs. In La Liga, he won 79, lost 62 and drew 59 matches. He also managed 38 matches in the Primeira Liga with Benfica, winning 23 matches, losing eight and drawing seven matches.

== Career statistics ==
=== Player ===
==== Club ====
Jupp Heynckes at WorldFootball.net

Club	Season	League			DFB-Pokal		Continental		Other		Total	
Club	Season	Division	Apps	Goals	Apps	Goals	Apps	Goals	Apps	Goals	Apps	Goals
Borussia Mönchengladbach	1964–65	Regionalliga West	26	23	0	0	—		6 (Note: Appearances in Bundesliga promotion play-offs)	6	31	29
Borussia Mönchengladbach	1965–66	Bundesliga	27	12	2	0	—		—		29	12
Borussia Mönchengladbach	1966–67	Bundesliga	30	15	1	0	—		—		31	15
Borussia Mönchengladbach	Total		83	50	3	0	—		6	6	91	56
Hannover 96	1967–68	Bundesliga	29	10	1	0	1 (Note: Appearance(s) in Inter-Cities Fairs Cup)	0	—		31	10
Hannover 96	1968–69	Bundesliga	34	9	4	2	6	5	—		44	16
Hannover 96	1969–70	Bundesliga	23	6	1	2	2	1	—		26	9
Hannover 96	Total		86	25	6	4	9	6	—		101	35
Borussia Mönchengladbach	1970–71	Bundesliga	33	19	6	2	4 (Note: Appearances in European Cup)	2	—		43	23
Borussia Mönchengladbach	1971–72	Bundesliga	31	19	5	2	4	1	—		40	22
Borussia Mönchengladbach	1972–73	Bundesliga	33	28	9	7	11 (Note: Appearances in UEFA Cup)	12			53	47
Borussia Mönchengladbach	1973–74	Bundesliga	33	30	3	2	7 (Note: Appearances in European Cup Winners' Cup)	8	—		43	40
Borussia Mönchengladbach	1974–75	Bundesliga	31	27	2	4	10	11	—		43	42
Borussia Mönchengladbach	1975–76	Bundesliga	24	12	4	1	6	6	—		34	19
Borussia Mönchengladbach	1976–77	Bundesliga	20	15	0	0	7	1			27	16
Borussia Mönchengladbach	1977–78	Bundesliga	21	18	0	0	6	4	0	0	27	22
Borussia Mönchengladbach	Total		226	168	29	18	54	45	0	0	309	232
Career total			395	243	38	22	63	51	6	6	501	324

==== International ====
West Germany
Year	Apps	Goals
1967	2	2
1968	0	0
1969	1	0
1970	3	0
1971	7	0
1972	6	0
1973	6	3
1974	6	2
1975	5	4
1976	3	3
Total	39	14

No.	Date	Venue	Opponent	Score	Result	Competition
1	22 February 1967	Wildparkstadion, Karlsruhe, West Germany	Morocco	4–1	5–1	Friendly
2	22 March 1967	Niedersachsenstadion, Hanover, West Germany	Bulgaria	1–0	1–0	Friendly
3	14 February 1973	Olympiastadion, Munich, West Germany	Argentina	1–3	2–3	Friendly
4	24 November 1973	Neckarstadion, Stuttgart, West Germany	Spain	1–0	2–1	Friendly
5	24 November 1973	Neckarstadion, Stuttgart, West Germany	Spain	2–0	2–1	Friendly
6	1 May 1974	Volksparkstadion, Hamburg, West Germany	Sweden	1–0	2–0	Friendly
7	1 May 1974	Volksparkstadion, Hamburg, West Germany	Sweden	2–0	2–0	Friendly
8	11 October 1975	Rheinstadion, Düsseldorf, West Germany	Greece	1–0	1–1	UEFA Euro 1976 qualifying
9	19 November 1975	Neckarstadion, Stuttgart, West Germany	Bulgaria	1–0	1–0	UEFA Euro 1976 qualifying
10	20 December 1975	İnönü Stadı, Istanbul, Turkey	Turkey	1–0	5–0	Friendly
11	20 December 1975	İnönü Stadı, Istanbul, Turkey	Turkey	5–0	5–0	Friendly
12	28 February 1976	Westfalenstadion, Dortmund, West Germany	Malta	3–0	8–0	UEFA Euro 1976 qualifying
13	28 February 1976	Westfalenstadion, Dortmund, West Germany	Malta	5–0	8–0	UEFA Euro 1976 qualifying
14	6 October 1976	Ninian Park, Cardiff, Wales	Wales	2–0	2–0	Friendly

=== Managerial ===
Team	From	To	Record					
Team	From	To	G	W	D	L	Win %	Ref.
Borussia Mönchengladbach	1 July 1979	30 June 1987	343	169	77	97	49.27	
Bayern Munich	1 July 1987	8 October 1991	198	113	46	39	57.07	
Athletic Bilbao	1 July 1992	30 June 1994	82	34	20	28	41.46	
Eintracht Frankfurt	1 July 1994	2 April 1995	34	12	10	12	35.29	
Tenerife	1 July 1995	26 June 1997	104	44	27	33	42.31	
Real Madrid	26 June 1997	28 May 1998	53	26	15	12	49.06	
Benfica	1 July 1999	20 September 2000	48	27	8	13	56.25	
Athletic Bilbao	1 July 2001	17 June 2003	86	36	22	28	41.86	
Schalke 04	17 June 2003	15 September 2004	57	28	14	15	49.12	
Borussia Mönchengladbach	1 July 2006	31 January 2007	21	5	4	12	23.81	
Bayern Munich	28 April 2009	5 June 2009	5	4	1	0	80.00	
Bayer Leverkusen	5 June 2009	30 June 2011	84	44	26	14	52.38	
Bayern Munich	1 July 2011	26 June 2013	109	83	12	14	76.15	
Bayern Munich	9 October 2017	30 June 2018	41	32	4	5	78.05	
Total			1,265	657	286	322	51.94	—

== Honours ==
=== Club ===
Borussia Mönchengladbach

- Bundesliga: 1970–71, 1974–75, 1975–76, 1976–77
- DFB-Pokal: 1972–73
- UEFA Cup: 1974–75; runner-up: 1972–73
- European Cup runner-up: 1976–77

=== International ===
West Germany

- FIFA World Cup: 1974
- UEFA European Championship: 1972

=== Manager ===
Borussia Mönchengladbach

- UEFA Cup runner-up: 1979–80

Bayern Munich

- Bundesliga: 1988–89, 1989–90, 2012–13, 2017–18
- DFB-Pokal: 2012–13
- DFB/DFL-Supercup: 1987, 1990, 2012
- UEFA Champions League: 2012–13; runner-up: 2011–12

Real Madrid

- UEFA Champions League: 1997–98
- Supercopa de España: 1997

Schalke 04

- UEFA Intertoto Cup: 2003, 2004

=== Individual ===
Player

- kicker Bundesliga Team of the Season: 1971–72, 1973–74, 1974–75
- Bundesliga top scorer: 1973–74, 1974–75
- European Cup top scorer: 1975–76
- European Cup Winners' Cup top scorer: 1973–74
- UEFA Cup top scorer: 1972–73, 1974–75
- UEFA European Championship Team of the Tournament: 1972

Manager

- FIFA World Coach of the Year: 2013
- IFFHS World's Best Club Coach: 2013; runner-up: 1998
- VDV Bundesliga Coach of the Season: 2012–13, 2017–18
- German Football Manager of the Year: 2013, 2018
- World Soccer Awards Manager of the Year: 2013
- France Football magazine 25th Greatest Manager of All time: 2019

== See also ==
- List of football managers with the most matches
