= Hans Dorfner =

German footballer (born 1965)

Personal information
- Full name: Hans Dorfner
- Date of birth: 3 July 1965 (age 61)
- Place of birth: Nittendorf, West Germany
- Height: 1.73 m (5 ft 8 in)
- Position: Midfielder

Youth career
- 1972–1982: ASV Undorf
- 1982–1983: Bayern Munich

Senior career*
Years	Team	Apps	(Gls)
1982–1984	Bayern Munich II		
1983–1991	Bayern Munich	111	(17)
1984–1986	→ 1. FC Nürnberg (loan)	51	(6)
1991–1994	1. FC Nürnberg	60	(4)
Total		222	(27)

International career
1983	West Germany U-18	5	(0)
1985	West Germany U-21	3	(0)
1987	West Germany Olympic	1	(0)
1987–1989	West Germany	7	(1)
- * Club domestic league appearances and goals

Hans Dorfner (born 3 July 1965) is a German former footballer who played as a midfielder.

== Career ==
Dorfner played as a midfielder for Bayern Munich and 1. FC Nürnberg in the (West) German top-flight. He won seven caps for West Germany in the late 1980s, and went to UEFA Euro 1988 as an unused squad member. His career was cut short by injury after the 1993/94 season.

== Career statistics ==
Appearances and goals by national team and year
National team	Year	Apps	Goals
West Germany	1987	3	0
West Germany	1988	2	0
West Germany	1989	2	1
Total		7	1

Scores and results list West Germany's goal tally first, score column indicates score after each Dorfner goal.

List of international goals scored by Hans Dorfner
No.	Date	Venue	Cap	Opponent	Score	Result	Competition
1.	6 September 1989	Lansdowne Road, Dublin, Ireland	6	Republic of Ireland	1–1	1–1	Friendly

== Honours ==
=== Club ===
Bayern Munich

- DFB-Pokal: 1983–84
- Bundesliga: 1986–87, 1988–89, 1989–90
- DFL-Supercup: 1987

1. FC Nürnberg

- 2. Bundesliga: 1984–85
