= Christian Hausmann =

German footballer

Personal information
- Date of birth: 21 November 1963 (age 62)
- Height: 1.78 m (5 ft 10 in)
- Positions: Midfielder; striker

Youth career
- Alt-Holland Berlin

Senior career*
| Years | Team | Apps | (Gls) |
| –1986 | Reinickendorfer Füchse | | |
| 1986–1988 | Bayer 04 Leverkusen | 56 | (2) |
| 1989–1991 | 1. FC Nürnberg | 50 | (5) |
| 1991 | Hertha BSC | 21 | (1) |

Managerial career
- 2007–2010: VfL Witzhelden
- * Club domestic league appearances and goals

Christian Hausmann (born 21 November 1963) is a retired German football player.

== Honours ==
- UEFA Europa League winner: 1987–88
