= Ludwig Kögl =

German footballer

Personal information
- Full name: Ludwig Kögl
- Date of birth: 7 March 1966 (age 60)
- Place of birth: Penzberg, West Germany
- Height: 1.71 m (5 ft 7 in)
- Position: Midfielder

Youth career
- 1972–1982: FC Penzberg
- 1982–1983: TSV Starnberg

Senior career*
Years	Team	Apps	(Gls)
1983–1984	1860 Munich	12	(2)
1984–1990	Bayern Munich	149	(8)
1990–1996	VfB Stuttgart	139	(14)
1996–1999	FC Luzern	105	(14)
1999–2001	SpVgg Unterhaching	21	(1)
Total		426	(39)

International career
1984–1987	West Germany U-21	16	(0)
1985	West Germany	2	(0)
- * Club domestic league appearances and goals

Ludwig Kögl (born 7 March 1966) is a German former professional footballer who played as a midfielder.

== Club career ==
Kögl was born in Penzberg. He played more than 300 (West) German top-flight for FC Bayern Munich, VfB Stuttgart and SpVgg Unterhaching, and won six (West) German titles. The Bavarian helped Bayern to the 1987 European Cup final where he scored, giving them a first-half lead. They would, however, go on to lose the game 2–1 to FC Porto.

== International career ==
Kögl won two caps for West Germany in 1985.

== Honours ==
Bayern Munich

- Bundesliga: 1984–85, 1985–86, 1986–87, 1988–89, 1989–90
- DFB-Pokal: 1985–86; runner-up 1984–85
- European Cup: runner-up 1986–87

VfB Stuttgart

- Bundesliga: 1991–92
- DFL-Supercup: 1992
