= Grotenburg-Stadion =

Multi-use stadium in Krefeld, Germany

Coordinates: 51°20′20″N 6°36′13″E

- Grotenburg
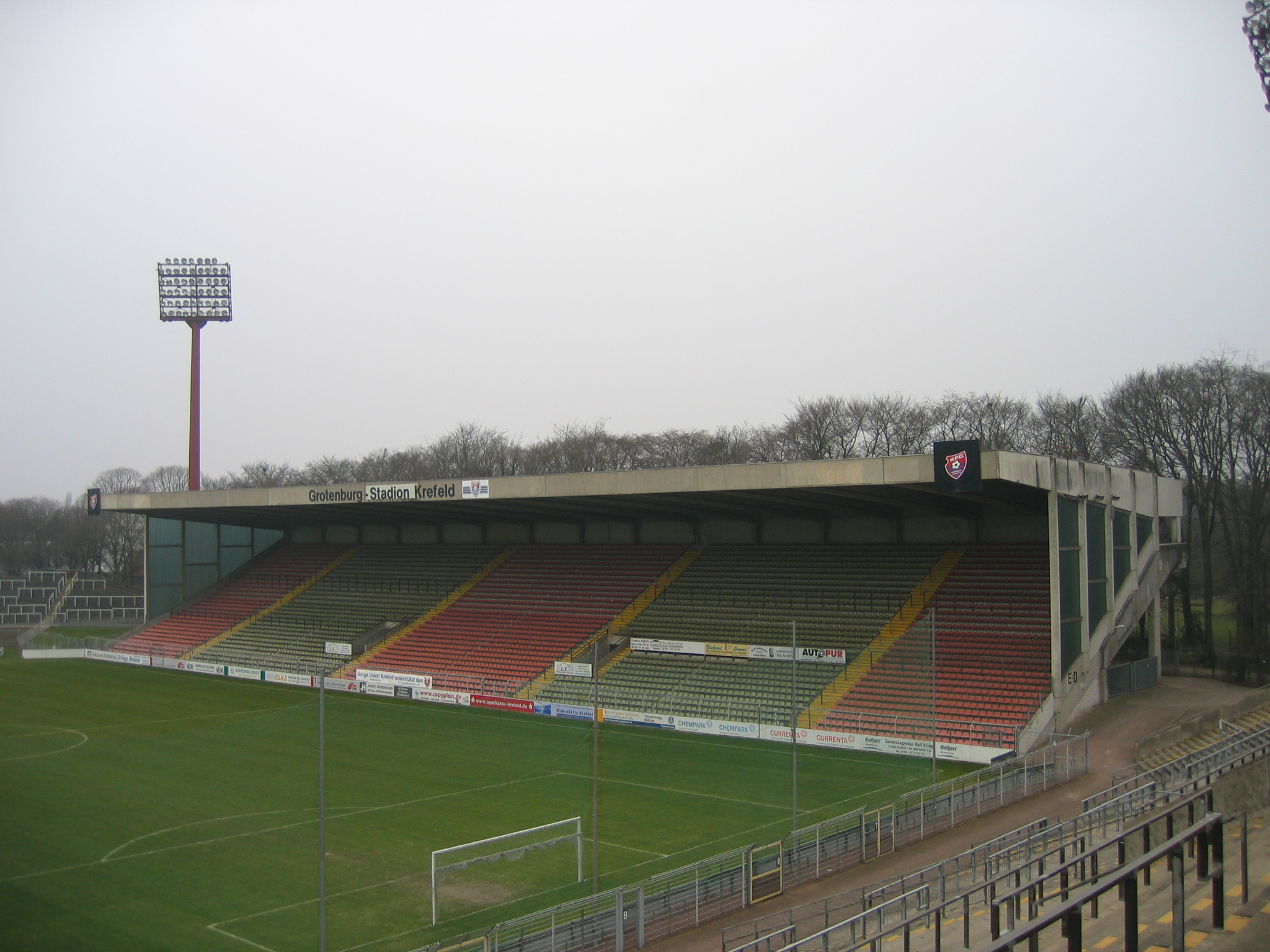
- Grotenburg-Stadion
- Interactive map of Grotenburg-Stadion
- Location: Krefeld
- Owner: City of Krefeld
- Capacity: 34,500 (10,868 for safety reasons)
- Surface: grass

Construction
- Opened: September 18, 1927

Tenant
- KFC Uerdingen 05

The Grotenburg-Stadion (German pronunciation: [ˈɡʁoːtn̩bʊʁkˌʃtaːdi̯ɔn]) is a multi-use stadium in Krefeld, Germany.

It is used mostly for football matches and hosts the home matches for former DFB-Pokal winner KFC Uerdingen 05.

The stadium has a capacity of 34,500 and was built in 1927.

The 1970s brought significant renovations, including new seating and a floodlight system.

In the 1980s, further expansions and modernizations took place, transforming it into a modern stadium.

Despite periods of decline and closure, recent renovations and community efforts have revitalized the stadium, allowing it to continue hosting events.
