= 1990–91 FC Bayern Munich season =

91st season in existence of Bayern Munich

FC Bayern Munich
1990–91 season
- Manager: Jupp Heynckes
- Stadium: Olympiastadion
- Bundesliga: 2nd
- European Cup: Semifinals
- DFB-Pokal: 1st Round
- DFB-Supercup: Winner
- Top goalscorer: League: Roland Wohlfarth (21); All: Roland Wohlfarth (24)
Home colours

The 1990–91 FC Bayern Munich season was the 91st season in the club's history and 26th season since promotion from Regionalliga Süd in 1965. Bayern finished three points behind champions 1. FC Kaiserslautern in the Bundesliga. In the DFB-Pokal, Bayern were eliminated in the first round for the first time in club history. Bayern reached the semifinals of the European Cup before being eliminated by Red Star Belgrade due to an own goal in the 90th minute of the second leg. The first competitive match of the season was the DFB-Supercup on 31 July which Bayern won by a score of 4–1 over 1. FC Kaiserslautern.

== Review and events ==
=== Pre-season ===
Players to transfer to Bayern this summer were: Stefan Effenberg from Borussia Mönchengladbach, Gerald Hillringhaus from SV Türk Gücü München, Brian Laudrup from Bayer 05 Uerdingen, Michael Sternkopf from Karlsruher SC, and Christian Ziege from Hertha Zehlendorf. Rainer Aigner was promoted from Bayern Munich II and Markus Münch was promoted from Bayern Munich Junior Team. Ludwig Kögl left Bayern for VfB Stuttgart, Thomas Kastenmaier left for Borussia Mönchengladbach, and Hansi Flick left for 1. FC Köln. The Fuji-Cup took place on 24 July and 25 July in Lüdenscheid. The semifinal match against Borussia Dortmund finished as a goalless draw which was decided by a penalty shoot-out with Bayern going to the third place match. The third place match against 1. FC Köln was won by a score of 4–1. Bayern defeated 1. FC Kaiserslautern in the DFB-Supercup on 31 July 4–1.

=== August ===
Bayern faced FV 09 Weinheim in the first round of the DFB-Pokal on 4 August. FV 09 Weinheim won the match 1–0 due to a penalty kick scored by Thomas Schwechheimer after a foul by Thomas Strunz which resulted in a red card. Due to the loss, Bayern were eliminated from the DFB-Pokal in the first round for the first time in club history. The first Bundesliga match of the season took place on 11 August which resulted in a 1–1 draw against Bayer 04 Leverkusen. On 14 August, Bayern faced FC St. Pauli in a match that ended goalless. The Teresa Herrera Trophy took place 16–18 August. In a semifinal match against S.L. Benfica, Bayern lost 1–2. In the third place match on 18 August against Deportivo de La Coruña, Bayern won 3–2 due to a hat-trick by Alan McInally. The first win of the Bundesliga season came against VfB Stuttgart 2–1 on 25 August.

=== September ===
September started with a 3–2 win over Karlsruher SC on 1 September. The win streak continued on 7 September when Bayern defeated 1. FC Kaiserslautern 4–0. By defeating Fortuna Düsseldorf 2–1 on 15 September, Bayern extended its win streak to four matches. The first European Cup match took place on 19 September when Bayern defeated APOEL F.C. 3–2. A 2–2 draw against VfL Bochum on 22 September kept Bayern undefeated through seven Bundesliga matches. The first loss of the Bundesliga season came on 28 September against SV Werder Bremen with Bayern losing 0–1.

=== October ===
The second leg of the European Cup first round was played on 2 October. Bayern won this match 4–0 over APOEL which resulted in an aggregate score of 7–2 allowing Bayern to advance to the second round. Radmilo Mihajlović scored a hat-trick in this match. Bayern defeated Borussia Mönchengladbach 4–1 on 6 October. The 0–4 loss to 1. FC Köln on 13 October saw three red cards, two for Bayern and one for Köln. Hamburger SV faced Bayern on 20 October in a match which Bayern won 6–1. The first leg of the second round of the European Cup took place on 23 October with Bayern defeating PFC CSKA Sofia 4–0. October ended with a 4–1 victory over Eintracht Frankfurt on 27 October.

=== November ===
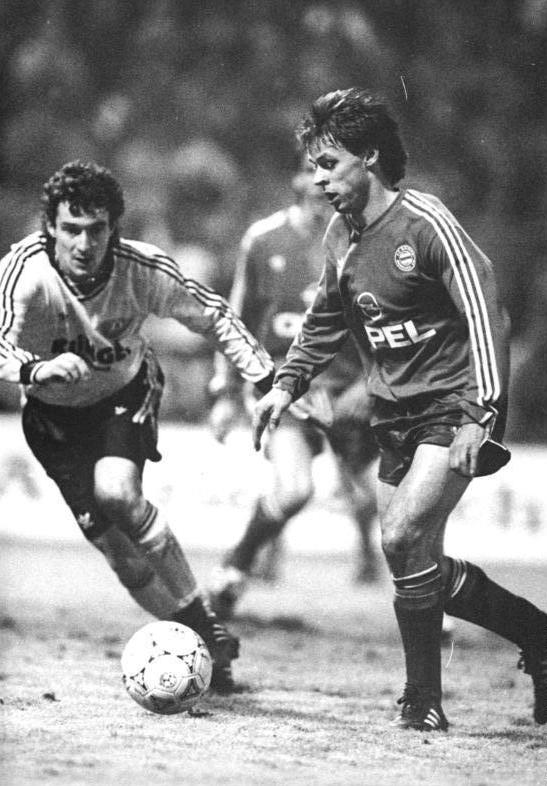
Hans-Uwe Pilz of Dynamo Dresden, and Olaf Thon of Bayern Munich in the Deutschland Cup.

On 6 November, Bayern defeated PFC CSKA Sofia 3–0 (7–0 aggregate) to move on to the quarterfinals of the European Cup. The third loss of the Bundesliga season came on 10 November to Borussia Dortmund by a score of 2–3. A goalless draw with Hertha BSC followed on 17 November. The final Bundesliga match of the month came on 24 November when Bayern defeated SG Wattenscheid 09 7–0. On 27 November, Bayern, champions of 1989–90 Bundesliga, and Dynamo Dresden, champions of 1989–90 DDR-Oberliga, took part in the Deutschland Cup as a part of German reunification. Dresden won the match 1–0.

=== December–February ===
On 8 December, Bayern defeated 1. FC Nürnberg 1–0. The final Bundesliga game of the first half of the season was a 1–1 draw with Bayer 05 Uerdingen which left Bayern in second place. The Bundesliga took a two-month winter break between matchday 17 and matchday 18. Winter saw transfers of Radmilo Mihajlović to FC Schalke 04 and Hans Dorfner to 1. FC Nürnberg. Bayern competed in the Miami Cup in Miami, Florida. A goalless draw against Colombia took place on 1 February. Bayern defeated the United States 4–0 on 3 February. The Fort Lauderdale Strikers held Bayern to a goalless draw in a friendly played on 6 February. A match against Bayer Leverkusen on 23 February was the only competitive match of the month. Bayern won by the score 2–1.

=== March ===
St. Pauli defeated Bayern 0–1 on 2 March. The first leg of the European Cup quarterfinals on 6 March ended 1–1 against FC Porto. Bayern defeated VfB Stuttgart on 9 March 3–0. On 15 March, Bayern defeated Karlsruher SC 3–0. Bayern defeated Porto 2–0 (3–1 aggregate) on 20 March to advance to the semifinals of the European Cup. The fifth Bundesliga loss of the season came on 23 March against 1. FC Kaiserslautern. Bayern, reduced to 10 men after a 65th minute red card for Manfred Bender, lost the match 1–2.

=== April ===
Fortuna Düsseldorf defeated Bayern 0–1 on 2 April. After two consecutive losses, Bayern defeated VfL Bochum 2–1. The first leg of the European Cup semifinals against Red Star Belgrade on 10 April ended in a 1–2 loss. A 1–1 draw against Werder Bremen was played on 13 April. Borussia Mönchengladbach also held Bayern to a 1–1 draw on 16 April. The final Bundesliga match of the month was a 2–2 draw with 1. FC Köln. An own goal in the 90th minute by Klaus Augenthaler in the second leg of the European Cup semifinals on 24 April saw Bayern eliminated from the competition. The goal caused the game to be a 2–2 draw but the aggregate score of 3–4 saw eventual champions Red Star Belgrade advance to the finals.

=== May ===
Bayern had a perfect record in May with wins over Hamburger SV, Eintracht Frankfurt, Borussia Dortmund, and Hertha BSC. On 5 May, Bayern defeated Hamburger SV 3–2. Bayern defeated Eintracht Frankfurt 2–0 on 11 May. The win streak continued against Borussia Dortmund on 17 May with Bayern winning 3–2. The final match of the month, on 25 May, was a 7–3 victory over Hertha BSC. Olaf Thon scored a hat-trick in this match.

=== June ===
The win streak came to an end on 1 June when Bayern lost to SG Wattenscheid 09 2–3. This loss was followed by a win over 1. FC Nürnberg by a score of 1–0. A 2–2 draw against Bayer 05 Uerdingen on the final matchday saw Bayern finish in second place three points behind Bundesliga champion 1. FC Kaiserslautern.

== Results ==
=== Friendlies ===
==== Fuji-Cup ====
24 July Semifinals	Borussia Dortmund	0–0 (6–4 p)	Bayern Munich	Lüdenscheid

25 July Third Place	Bayern Munich	4–1	1. FC Köln	Lüdenscheid
	Mihajlović 18', 80'; Grahammer 53' (pen.); Sternkopf 89'		Banach 28' (pen.)

==== Teresa Herrera Trophy ====
17 August Semifinals	S.L. Benfica	2–1	Bayern Munich	A Coruña, Spain
	Schwartz 9'; Aguas 84'		McInally 89'	Stadium: Estadio Riazor

18 August Third Place	Deportivo de La Coruña	2–3	Bayern Munich	A Coruña, Spain
	Uralde 23'; Mújica 82' (pen.)		McInally 39', 53', 80'	Stadium: Estadio Riazor

==== Miami Cup ====
Bayern Munich finished second in the final table of the tournament.

1 February	Colombia	0–0	Bayern Munich	Miami, Florida, United States
21:30 EST				Stadium: Orange Bowl

3 February	United States	0–4	Bayern Munich	Miami, Florida, United States
14:00 EST				Stadium: Orange Bowl

==== Other friendlies ====
6 February	Fort Lauderdale Strikers	0–0	Bayern Munich	Fort Lauderdale, Florida, United States
19:30 EST				Stadium: Lockhart Stadium; Attendance: 3,166

== Results ==
=== Bundesliga ===
==== League table ====
Pos	Team	Pld	W	D	L	GF	GA	GD	Pts	Qualification or relegation
1	1. FC Kaiserslautern (C)	34	19	10	5	72	45	+27	48	Qualification to European Cup first round
2	Bayern Munich	34	18	9	7	74	41	+33	45	Qualification to UEFA Cup first round (Note: As Werder Bremen qualified for the Cup Winners' Cup, their UEFA-Cup place was transferred to Stuttgart.)
3	Werder Bremen	34	14	14	6	46	29	+17	42	Qualification to Cup Winners' Cup first round
4	Eintracht Frankfurt	34	15	10	9	63	40	+23	40	Qualification to UEFA Cup first round
5	Hamburger SV	34	16	8	10	60	38	+22	40	Qualification to UEFA Cup first round

Source: www.dfb.de
Rules for classification: 1) points; 2) goal difference; 3) number of goals scored.
The league expanded to 20 teams for the 1991–92 season because of the integration of the two best East German Oberliga teams due to German reunification.
(C) Champions
Notes:

Aug 11, 1990 1	Bayern Munich	1-1	Bayer Leverkusen	Munich
15:30	Effenberg 83' (pen.)		Kirsten 63'	Stadium: Olympiastadion; Attendance: 42,000; Referee: Hans-Peter Dellwing

Aug 14, 1990 2	FC St. Pauli	0-0	Bayern Munich	Hamburg
20:00				Stadium: Stadion am Millerntor; Attendance: 20,551; Referee: Edgar Steinborn

Aug 25, 1990 3	Bayern Munich	2-1	VfB Stuttgart	Munich
15:30	Strunz 6'; Bender 62'		Frontzeck 30'	Stadium: Olympiastadion; Attendance: 73,153; Referee: Gerhard Theobald

Sep 1, 1990 4	Karlsruher SC	2-3	Bayern Munich	Karlsruhe
15:30	Kohler 32' (pen.); Hermann 59'		Laudrup 9'; Wohlfarth 20'; Reuter 90' (pen.)	Stadium: Wildparkstadion; Attendance: 33,000; Referee: Georg Dardenne

Sep 7, 1990 5	Bayern Munich	4-0	Kaiserslautern	Munich
20:00	Wohlfarth 43'; Dorfner 48'; Strunz 53'; Hotić 63' (o.g.)			Stadium: Olympiastadion; Attendance: 27,000; Referee: Jürgen Aust

Sep 15, 1990 6	Fortuna Düsseldorf	1-2	Bayern Munich	Düsseldorf
15:30	Hutwelker 89'		Strunz 18'; Bender 58'	Stadium: Rheinstadion; Attendance: 48,000; Referee: Manfred Harder

Sep 22, 1990 7	Bayern Munich	2-2	VfL Bochum	Munich
15:30	Wohlfarth 4'; Augenthaler 33'		Kohler 47' (o.g.); Legat 84'	Stadium: Olympiastadion; Attendance: 29,000; Referee: Wolfgang Mierswa

Sep 28, 1990 8	Werder Bremen	1-0	Bayern Munich	Bremen
20:00	Borowka 52'			Stadium: Weserstadion; Attendance: 32,875; Referee: Karl-Josef Assenmacher

Oct 6, 1990 9	Bayern Munich	4-1	Borussia Mönchengladbach	Munich
15:30	Strunz 53' (pen.); Wohlfarth 58', 60'; Kohler 89'		Kastenmaier 77'	Stadium: Olympiastadion; Attendance: 51,000; Referee: Werner Föckler

Oct 13, 1990 10	Köln	4–0	Bayern Munich	Cologne
15:30	Ordenewitz 3'; Janßen 25'; Banach 38'; Sturm 66'			Stadium: Müngersdorfer Stadion; Attendance: 54,000; Referee: Wolf-Rüdiger Umbach

Oct 20, 1990 11	Bayern Munich	6-1	Hamburger SV	Munich
15:30	Wohlfarth 3'; Laudrup 17'; Pflügler 42'; Strunz 48'; Reuter 60'; Sternkopf 78'		Stratos 24'	Stadium: Olympiastadion; Attendance: 25,000; Referee: Hans-Jürgen Weber

Oct 27, 1990 12	Eintracht Frankfurt	1-4	Bayern Munich	Frankfurt
15:30	Eckstein 82'		Wohlfarth 28'; Laudrup 41'; Effenber 65'; Kohler 77'	Stadium: Waldstadion; Attendance: 61,000; Referee: Manfred Neuner

Nov 10, 1990 13	Bayern Munich	2-3	Borussia Dortmund	Munich
15:30	Effenberg 70'; Thon 90'		Helmer 79'; Wegmann 81'; Povlsen 85'	Stadium: Olympiastadion; Attendance: 29,000; Referee: Alfons Berg

Nov 17, 1990 14	Hertha BSC	0-0	Bayern Munich	Berlin
15:30				Stadium: Olympiastadion; Attendance: 38,752; Referee: Michael Prengel

Nov 24, 1990 15	Bayern Munich	7-0	Wattenscheid 09	Munich
15:30	Effenberg 7'; Bender 13'; Wohlfarth 33', 77'; Laudrup 53', 88'; Kohler 60'			Stadium: Olympiastadion; Attendance: 19,000; Referee: Karl-Heinz Tritschler

Dec 8, 1990 16	Bayern Munich	1-0	Nürnberg	Munich
15:30	Wohlfarth 34'			Stadium: Olympiastadion; Attendance: 30,000; Referee: Hellmut Krug

Dec 15, 1990 17	Bayer 05 Uerdingen	1-1	Bayern Munich	Krefeld
15:30	Fach 86'		Wohlfarth 55'	Stadium: Grotenburg-Stadion; Attendance: 17,200; Referee: Markus Merk

Feb 23, 1991 18	Bayer Leverkusen	1-2	Bayern Munich	Leverkusen
15:30	Pagé 62'		Wohlfarth 80'; Laudrup 87'	Stadium: Ulrich-Haberland-Stadion; Attendance: 24,000; Referee: Werner Föckler

Mar 2, 1991 19	Bayern Munich	0-1	St. Pauli	Munich
15:30			Sievers 43'	Stadium: Olympiastadion; Attendance: 15,000; Referee: Manfred Führer

Mar 9, 1991 20	VfB Stuttgart	0-3	Bayern Munich	Stuttgart
15:30			Wohlfarth 32', 47'; Thon 87' (pen.)	Stadium: Neckarstadion; Attendance: 68,000; Referee: Siegfried Kirschen

Mar 15, 1991 21	Bayern Munich	3-0	Karlsruher SC	Munich
20:00	Laudrup 18'; Effenberg 50'; Wohlfarth 55'			Stadium: Olympiastadion; Attendance: 23,000; Referee: Lothar Löwer

Mar 23, 1991 22	1. FC Kaiserslautern	2-1	Bayern Munich	Kaiserslautern
15:30	Hotić 60'; Kuntz 85'		Wohlfarth 4'	Stadium: Fritz-Walter-Stadion; Attendance: 38,500; Referee: Karl-Josef Assenmacher

Apr 2, 1991 23	Bayern Munich	0-1	Fortuna Düsseldorf	Munich
20:00			Allofs 64'	Stadium: Olympiastadion; Attendance: 18,000; Referee: Wolf-Günter Wiesel

Apr 6, 1991 24	VfL Bochum	1–2	Bayern Munich	Bochum
15:30	Heinemann 22' (pen.)		Bender 51'; Wohlfarth 73'	Stadium: Ruhrstadion; Attendance: 40,051; Referee: Manfred Harder

Apr 13, 1991 25	Bayern Munich	1-1	Werder Bremen	Munich
15:30	Wohlfarth 15'		Rufer 55' (pen.)	Stadium: Olympiastadion; Attendance: 50,000; Referee: Klaus Broska

Apr 16, 1991 26	Borussia Mönchengladbach	1–1	Bayern Munich	Mönchengladbach
20:00	Criens 77'		Augenthaler 89'	Stadium: Bökelbergstadion; Attendance: 34,000; Referee: Markus Merk

Apr 20, 1991 27	Bayern Munich	2-2	Köln	Munich
15:30	Laudrup 2'; Schwabl 86'		Banach 60'; Götz 88'	Stadium: Olympiastadion; Attendance: 27,000; Referee: Edgar Steinborn

May 5, 1991 28	Hamburger SV	2-3	Bayern Munich	Hamburg
18:00	Nando 30'; Furtok 79'		Reuter 9', 90'; Thon 87'	Stadium: Volksparkstadion; Attendance: 61,000; Referee: Hellmut Krug

May 11, 1991 29	Bayern Munich	2-0	Eintracht Frankfurt	Munich
15:30	Kohler 70'; Effenberg 87'			Stadium: Olympiastadion; Attendance: 37,000; Referee: Bodo Kriegelstein

May 17, 1991 30	Borussia Dortmund	2-3	Bayern Munich	Dortmund
20:00	Poschner 4'; Rummenigge 55'		Grahammer 45'; Laudrup 62'; Ziege 87'	Stadium: Westfalenstadion; Attendance: 53,000; Referee: Gerhard Theobald

May 25, 1991 31	Bayern Munich	7-3	Hertha BSC	Munich
15:30	Thon 19', 44' (pen.), 72'; Effenberg 38'; Wohlfarth 50', 53'; Bender 74'		Kretschmer 37'; Čelić 58'; Zernicke 87'	Stadium: Olympiastadion; Attendance: 44,000; Referee: Hans-Jürgen Kasper

Jun 1, 1991 32	SG Wattenscheid 09	3-2	Bayern Munich	Bochum
15:30	Hartmann 61'; Neuhaus 69'; Fink 89'		Moser 38' (o.g.); Wohlfarth 87'	Stadium: Lohrheidestadion; Attendance: 35,000; Referee: Wolf-Günter Wiesel

Jun 8, 1991 33	Nürnberg	0-1	Bayern Munich	Nuremberg
15:30			Strunz 35'	Stadium: Städtisches Stadion; Attendance: 51,750; Referee: Hans-Jürgen Weber

Jun 15, 1991 34	Bayern Munich	2-2	Bayer 05 Uerdingen	Munich
15:30	Strunz 51'; Effenberg 54'		Witeczek 37'; Chapuisat 65'	Stadium: Olympiastadion; Attendance: 70,000; Referee: Alfons Berg

==== League standings ====
Pos	Team	Pld	W	D	L	GF	GA	GD	Pts	Qualification or relegation
1	1. FC Kaiserslautern (C)	34	19	10	5	72	45	+27	48	Qualification to European Cup first round
2	Bayern Munich	34	18	9	7	74	41	+33	45	Qualification to UEFA Cup first round (Note: As Werder Bremen qualified for the Cup Winners' Cup, their UEFA-Cup place was transferred to Stuttgart.)
3	Werder Bremen	34	14	14	6	46	29	+17	42	Qualification to Cup Winners' Cup first round
4	Eintracht Frankfurt	34	15	10	9	63	40	+23	40	Qualification to UEFA Cup first round
5	Hamburger SV	34	16	8	10	60	38	+22	40	Qualification to UEFA Cup first round

Source: www.dfb.de
Rules for classification: 1) points; 2) goal difference; 3) number of goals scored.
The league expanded to 20 teams for the 1991–92 season because of the integration of the two best East German Oberliga teams due to German reunification.
(C) Champions

=== DFB Pokal ===
4 August 1990 1st Round	FV 09 Weinheim	1–0	Bayern Munich	Weinheim
	Schwechheimer 28' (pen.)			Stadium: Sepp-Herberger-Stadion; Attendance: 10,000; Referee: Berthold Schneider

=== DFB-Supercup ===
31 July 1990 Final	Bayern Munich	4–1	1. FC Kaiserslautern	Karlsruhe
	Reuter 6'; Kohler 19'; Bender 28'; Strunz 45'		Kuntz 62'	Stadium: Wildparkstadion; Attendance: 27,000; Referee: Hans-Jürgen Weber

=== Deutschland Cup ===
27 November 1990 Final	Dynamo Dresden	1–0	Bayern Munich	Dresden
				Stadium: Rudolf-Harbig-Stadion

=== European Cup ===
==== 1st round ====
19 September 1st leg	APOEL F.C. (Cyprus)	2–3	(Germany) Bayern Munich	Nicosia, Cyprus
20:00 CET	Gogic 5'; Pantziaras 78'		Reuter 71'; McInally 87'; Strunz 89'	Stadium: Makario Stadium; Attendance: 12,000; Referee: Ștefan Dan Petrescu (Romania)

2 October 2nd leg	Bayern Munich (Germany)	4–0 (7–2 agg.)	(Cyprus) APOEL F.C.	Munich, Germany
20:15 CET	Augenthaler 47'; Mihajlović 62', 88', 90'			Stadium: Olympiastadion; Attendance: 11,000; Referee: Edgar Azzopardi (Malta)

==== 2nd round ====
23 October 1st leg	Bayern Munich (Germany)	4–0	(Bulgaria) PFC CSKA Sofia	Munich, Germany
20:00 CET	Reuter 2', 68' (pen.); Wohlfarth 28'; Augenthaler 54'			Stadium: Olympiastadion; Attendance: 11,500; Referee: Einar Halle (Norway)

6 November 2nd leg	PFC CSKA Sofia (Bulgaria)	0–3 (0–7 agg.)	(Germany) Bayern Munich	Sofia, Bulgaria
16:30 CET			Wohlfarth 15'; Effenberg 78'; McInally 83'	Stadium: Balgarska Armia Stadium; Attendance: 9,000; Referee: Henning Lund-sørensen (Denmark)

==== Quarterfinals ====
6 March 1st leg	Bayern Munich (Germany)	1–1	(Portugal) F.C. Porto	Munich, Germany
20:15 CET	Bender 30'		Domingos 65'	Stadium: Olympiastadion; Attendance: 40,000; Referee: Guy Goethals (Belgium)

20 March 2nd leg	F.C. Porto (Portugal)	0–2 (1–3 agg.)	(Germany) Bayern Munich	Porto, Portugal
21:30 CET			Ziege 18'; Pflügler 71'	Stadium: Estádio das Antas; Attendance: 80,000; Referee: Keith Hackett (England)

==== Semifinals ====
10 April 1st leg	Bayern Munich (Germany)	1–2	(Socialist Federal Republic of Yugoslavia) Red Star Belgrade	Munich, Germany
20:15 CEST	Wohlfarth 23'		Pančev 45'; Savićević 70'	Stadium: Olympiastadion; Attendance: 67,000; Referee: Hubert Forstinger (Austria)

24 April 2nd leg	Red Star Belgrade (Socialist Federal Republic of Yugoslavia)	2–2 (4–3 agg.)	(Germany) Bayern Munich	Belgrade, Yugoslavia
	Mihaljović 24'; Augenthaler 90' (o.g.)		Augenthaler 61'; Thon 66'	Stadium: Olympiastadion; Attendance: 80,000; Referee: Bruno Galler (Switzerland)

== Team statistics ==
Competition	First match	Last match	Starting round	Final position	Record							
Competition	First match	Last match	Starting round	Final position	G	W	D	L	GF	GA	GD	Win %
Bundesliga	11 August 1990	15 June 1991	Matchday 1	2nd	34	18	9	7	74	41	+33	52.94
DFB-Pokal	4 August 1990	4 August 1990	First round	First round	1	0	0	1	0	1	−1	0.00
DFB-Supercup	31 July 1990		Final	Winner	1	1	0	0	4	1	+3	100.00
European Cup	19 September 1990	24 April 1991	First round	Semifinals	8	5	2	1	20	7	+13	62.50
Total					44	24	11	9	98	50	+48	54.55

== Players ==
=== Squad, appearances and goals ===
No.	Pos	Nat	Player	Total		Bundesliga		DFB-Pokal		European Cup	
No.	Pos	Nat	Player	Apps	Goals	Apps	Goals	Apps	Goals	Apps	Goals
	GK	(Germany) GER	Raimond Aumann	40	0	32+0	0	1+0	0	7+0	0
	GK	(Germany) GER	Sven Scheuer	3	0	2+0	0	0+0	0	1+0	0
	GK	(Germany) GER	Gerald Hillringhaus	0	0	0+0	0	0+0	0	0+0	0
	DF	(Germany) GER	Stefan Reuter	39	7	30+0	4	1+0	0	8+0	3
	DF	(Germany) GER	Jürgen Kohler	37	4	29+0	4	1+0	0	7+0	0
	DF	(Germany) GER	Hans Pflügler	37	2	30+0	1	1+0	0	6+0	1
	DF	(Germany) GER	Klaus Augenthaler (captain)	35	4	27+0	2	1+0	0	7+0	2
	DF	(Germany) GER	Roland Grahammer	28	1	24+0	1	1+0	0	3+0	0
	DF	(Germany) GER	Markus Münch	3	0	1+1	0	0+0	0	0+1	0
	DF	(Germany) GER	Rainer Aigner	1	0	1+0	0	0+0	0	0+0	0
	DF	(Germany) GER	Ulf Kliche	1	0	0+0	0	0+0	0	0+1	0
	MF	(Germany) GER	Manfred Bender	42	6	22+11	5	1+0	0	6+2	1
	MF	(Germany) GER	Stefan Effenberg	41	10	29+3	9	1+0	0	8+0	1
	MF	(Germany) GER	Thomas Strunz	33	8	22+4	7	1+0	0	5+1	1
	MF	(Germany) GER	Olaf Thon	31	7	22+3	6	0+0	0	6+0	1
	MF	(Germany) GER	Manfred Schwabl	27	1	17+6	1	0+0	0	3+1	0
	MF	(Germany) GER	Christian Ziege	16	2	3+10	1	0+0	0	1+2	1
	MF	(Germany) GER	Michael Sternkopf	10	1	3+6	1	0+0	0	1+0	0
	MF	(Denmark) DEN	Allan Nielsen	1	0	0+1	0	0+0	0	0+0	0
	FW	(Germany) GER	Roland Wohlfarth	42	24	29+5	21	0+1	0	7+0	3
	FW	(Denmark) DEN	Brian Laudrup	41	9	33+0	9	1+0	0	6+1	0
	FW	(Scotland) SCO	Alan McInally	11	2	1+6	0	0+0	0	1+3	2
Players sold or loaned out after the start of the season:
	MF	(Germany) GER	Hans Dorfner	19	1	14+1	1	0+0	0	4+0	0
	FW	(Socialist Federal Republic of Yugoslavia) YUG	Radmilo Mihajlović	12	3	4+5	0	1+0	0	1+1	3
	FW	(Germany) GER	Ludwig Kögl	1	0	0+0	0	0+1	0	0+0	0
	MF	(Germany) GER	Thomas Kastenmaier	0	0	0+0	0	0+0	0	0+0	0

=== Minutes played ===
No.	Player	Total	Bundesliga	DFB-Pokal	DFB-Supercup	European Cup
	Raimond Aumann	3,690	2,880	90	90	630
	Stefan Reuter	3,510	2,610	90	90	720
	Stefan Effenberg	3,482	2,644	57	90	691
	Jürgen Kohler	3,419	2,609	90	90	630
	Brian Laudrup	3,402	2,669	90	74	569
	Hans Pflügler	3,398	2,678	90	90	540
	Roland Wohlfarth	3,322	2,706	33	16	567
	Klaus Augenthaler	3,098	2,362	90	90	556
	Manfred Bender	2,716	2,014	57	68	577
	Thomas Strunz	2,630	2,016	86	90	438
	Roland Grahammer	2,412	1,962	90	90	270
	Olaf Thon	2,295	1,812	0	0	483
	Manfred Schwabl	1,901	1,602	0	0	299
	Hans Dorfner	1,447	1,087	0	0	360
	Radmilo Mihajlović	591	304	90	90	107
	Christian Ziege	523	411	0	0	112
	Michael Sternkopf	439	344	22	0	73
	Sven Scheuer	270	180	0	0	90
	Alan McInally	333	209	0	0	124
	Markus Münch	113	105	0	0	8
	Rainer Aigner	90	90	0	0	0
	Ludwig Kögl	33	0	33	0	0
	Allan Nielsen	6	6	0	0	0
	Ulf Kliche	2	0	0	0	2

=== Bookings ===
No.	Player	Bundesliga			DFB-Pokal			European Cup			Total		
No.	Player	Booked	(yellow card) (red card)	Sent off (straight red)	Booked	(yellow card) (red card)	Sent off (straight red)	Booked	(yellow card) (red card)	Sent off (straight red)	Booked	(yellow card) (red card)	Sent off (straight red)
	Thomas Strunz	7	0	0	0	0	1	1	0	0	8	0	1
	Stefan Effenberg	6	0	0	0	0	0	1	0	0	7	0	0
	Roland Grahammer	4	0	0	1	0	0	2	0	0	7	0	0
	Jürgen Kohler	4	0	0	0	0	0	1	0	0	5	0	0
	Manfred Schwabl	4	0	0	0	0	0	1	0	0	5	0	0
	Klaus Augenthaler	3	0	0	1	0	0	0	0	1	4	0	1
	Hans Pflügler	2	0	0	0	0	0	1	0	0	3	0	0
	Roland Wohlfarth	3	0	0	0	0	0	0	0	0	3	0	0
	Christian Ziege	2	0	0	0	0	0	1	0	0	3	0	0
	Stefan Reuter	1	0	1	1	0	0	0	0	0	2	0	1
	Olaf Thon	2	0	0	0	0	0	0	0	0	2	0	0
	Manfred Bender	1	0	2	0	0	0	0	0	0	1	0	2
	Radmilo Mihajlović	1	0	1	0	0	0	0	0	0	1	0	1
	Hans Dorfner	1	0	0	0	0	0	0	0	0	1	0	0
	Brian Laudrup	1	0	0	0	0	0	0	0	0	1	0	0
	Alan McInally	1	0	0	0	0	0	0	0	0	1	0	0
	Markus Münch	1	0	0	0	0	0	0	0	0	1	0	0
Totals		44	0	4	3	0	1	8	0	1	55	0	6

== Transfers ==
=== In ===
Pos.	Name	Age	Moving from	Type	Transfer Window	Sources
DF	Rainer Aigner	22	Bayern Munich II	Promotion	Summer	
MF	Stefan Effenberg	21	Borussia Mönchengladbach	Transfer	Summer	
GK	Gerald Hillringhaus	28	SV Türk Gücü München	Transfer	Summer	
FW	Brian Laudrup	21	Bayer 05 Uerdingen	Transfer	Summer	
DF	Markus Münch	17	Bayern Munich Junior Team	Promotion	Summer	
MF	Michael Sternkopf	20	Karlsruher SC	Transfer	Summer	
MF	Christian Ziege	18	Hertha Zehlendorf	Transfer	Summer	

=== Out ===
Pos.	Name	Age	Moving to	Type	Transfer Window	Sources
FW	Radmilo Mihajlović	26	FC Schalke 04	Transfer	Winter	
MF	Hans Dorfner	25	1. FC Nürnberg	Transfer	Winter	
MF	Thomas Kastenmaier	24	Borussia Mönchengladbach	Transfer	Summer	
FW	Ludwig Kögl	24	VfB Stuttgart	Transfer	Summer	
MF	Hansi Flick	25	1. FC Köln	Transfer	Summer	
