= Deutschland-Cup (football) =

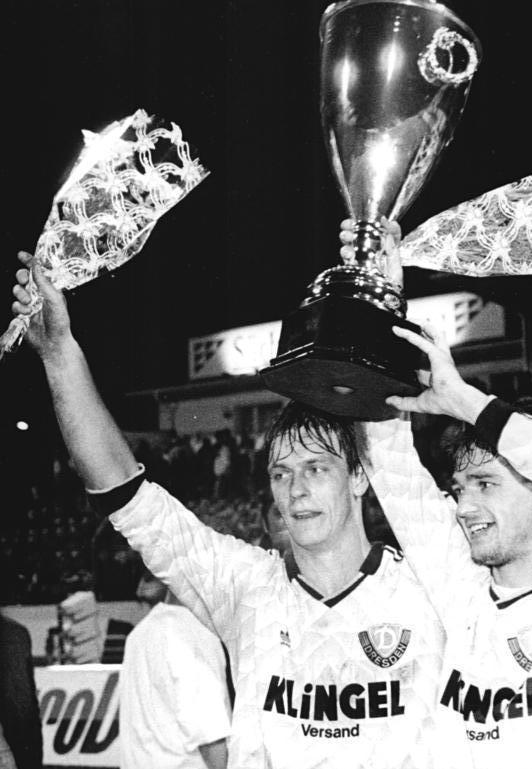
- Andreas Wagenhaus (left) and Mario Kern of Dynamo Dresden celebrate winning the Deutschland Cup
| Dynamo Dresden | Bayern Munich |
| 1 | 0 |
- Date: 27 November 1990
- Venue: Rudolf-Harbig-Stadion, Dresden
- Referee: Wieland Ziller (Königsbrück)

The Deutschland-Cup was a one-off football competition played in November 1990, to celebrate German reunification. The match was played one week after the dissolution of the East German Football Association and its merger with the German Football Association, and featured the reigning champions of East and West Germany, Dynamo Dresden and Bayern Munich respectively. The match, which was played at the Rudolf-Harbig-Stadion in Dresden, was won 1–0 by Dynamo.

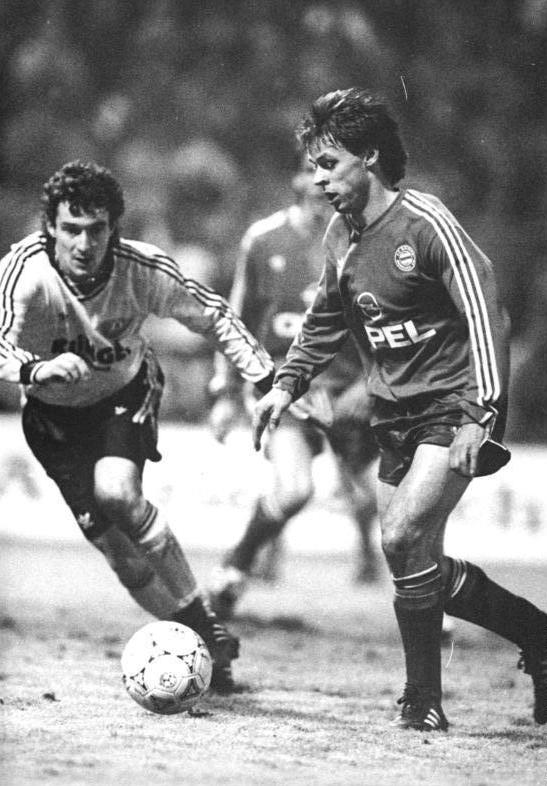
Hans-Uwe Pilz of Dynamo Dresden (left) and Olaf Thon of Bayern Munich in the Deutschland Cup

== Match ==
=== Details ===
27 November 1990
20:00 CET

| Dynamo Dresden | 1–0 | Bayern Munich |
|---|---|---|
| Gütschow 63' | Report |

Rudolf-Harbig-Stadion, Dresden
Referee: Wieland Ziller (Königsbrück)

| Dynamo Dresden | Bayern Munich |

| GK | 1 | (Germany) Ronny Teuber |
| SW | 3 | (Germany) Frank Lieberam |
| RB | 2 | (Germany) Detlef Schößler |
| CB | 5 | (Germany) Steffen Büttner |
| CB | 6 | (Germany) Mario Kern |
| LB | 4 | (Germany) Andreas Wagenhaus |
| CM | 7 | (Germany) Ralf Hauptmann |
| CM | 8 | (Germany) Hans-Uwe Pilz |
| CM | 9 | (Germany) Heiko Scholz | (substituted off) 88' |
| CF | 10 | (Germany) Sergio Allievi | (substituted off) 76' |
| CF | 11 | (Germany) Torsten Gütschow | (substituted off) 85' |
Substitutes:
| GK | 1 | (Germany) Thomas Köhler |
| DF | 12 | (Germany) Andreas Trautmann | (substituted on) 88' |
| DF | 13 | (Germany) Matthias Maucksch | (substituted on) 85' |
| DF | 14 | (Germany) Andreas Diebitz |
| MF | 18 | (Germany) Sven Kmetsch |
| FW | 15 | (Germany) Sven Ratke | (substituted on) 76' |
Manager:
(Germany) Reinhard Häfner

| GK | 1 | (Germany) Raimond Aumann | (substituted off) 46' |
| SW | 5 | (Germany) Stefan Reuter | (substituted off) 62' |
| CB | 2 | (Germany) Roland Grahammer |
| CB | 4 | (Germany) Jürgen Kohler |
| CB | 3 | (Germany) Hans Pflügler |
| RM | 8 | (Germany) Michael Sternkopf |
| CM | 6 | (Germany) Thomas Strunz |
| CM | 10 | (Germany) Olaf Thon |
| LM | 7 | (Germany) Christian Ziege |
| CF | 9 | (Socialist Federal Republic of Yugoslavia) Radmilo Mihajlović |
| CF | 11 | (Scotland) Alan McInally |
Substitutes:
| GK | 1 | (Germany) Sven Scheuer | (substituted on) 46' |
| MF | 2 | (Denmark) Allan Nielsen | (substituted on) 46' |
| MF | 12 | (Germany) Stefan Effenberg | (substituted on) 46' |
| MF | 15 | (Germany) Manfred Bender |
| MF | 16 | (Germany) Manfred Schwabl | (substituted on) 62' |
| FW | 13 | (Germany) Roland Wohlfarth |
| FW | 14 | (Denmark) Brian Laudrup |
Manager:
(Germany) Jupp Heynckes

== Similar matches ==

A similar match was held on 2 August 1990 to celebrate German reunification. The match featured the reigning cup winners of East and West Germany, Dynamo Dresden and 1. FC Kaiserslautern, respectively. The match, which was played at the Rudolf-Harbig-Stadion in Dresden, was won 2–4 on penalties by Kaiserslautern, following a 1–1 draw after extra time.

== See also ==
- 1989–90 Bundesliga
- 1989–90 DDR-Oberliga
- 1989–90 DFB-Pokal
- 1989–90 FDGB-Pokal
- 1990–91 Bundesliga
- 1990–91 DDR-Oberliga
- 1990–91 DFB-Pokal
- 1990–91 NOFV-Pokal
- 1991 DFB-Supercup
- East Germany–West Germany football rivalry
