= List of FC Bayern Munich II players =

The following players have gone on from Bayern Munich II to play for the Bayern Munich first-team.

Nat.	Player	Pos.	FCB II career	Apps	Goals	1st-team career	Apps	Goals	Note
(Germany)	Rainer Aigner	DF	1989–1991; 1994–1997	131	4	1990–1991	1	0	
(Austria)	David Alaba	MF	2009–2011	33	1	2010–2021	281	22	
(Germany)	Holger Badstuber	DF	2007–2009	55	7	2009–17	119	1	
(Germany)	Alexander Bugera	FW	1997–2003	55	23	1997–1999	3	0	
(Germany)	Emre Can	MF	2011–2013	31	3	2012–2013	4	1	
(Austria)	Harald Cerny	MF	1990–1992	22	7	1992–1993	16	1	
(Germany)	Diego Contento	DF	2008–2011	36	2	2010–2014	41	0	
(Italy)	Antonio Di Salvo	FW	2000–2001	44	29	2000–2001	6	0	
(Germany)	Max Eberl	DF	1991–1993	48	0	1991–1993	1	0	
(Germany)	Markus Feulner	MF	2000–2003	53	9	2001–2003	13	0	
(Germany)	Stephan Fürstner	MF	2005–2009	96	5	2006–2009	1	0	
(Germany)	Frank Gerster	MF	1994–1998	108	17	1996–1998	8	0	
(Turkey)	Berkant Göktan	FW	1998–2001	42	20	1998–2001	2	0	
(Germany)	Uwe Gospodarek	GK	1991–1995	64	0	1991–1995	7	0	
(United States)	Julian Green	FW	2013–2016	18	15	2013–2016	0	0	
(Germany)	Roman Grill	DF	1988–1999	?	?	1995–1996	0	0	
(Germany)	Marco Grimm	DF	1993–1995	44	1	1994–1995	1	0	
(Peru)	Paolo Guerrero	FW	2002–2004	66	45	2004–2006	27	10	
(Germany)	Dietmar Hamann	MF	1992–1994	24	8	1993–1998	105	6	
(England)	Owen Hargreaves	MF	2000–2001	26	6	2000–2007	145	5	
(Germany)	Steffen Hofmann	MF	2000–2002	53	12	2001–2002	1	0	
(Denmark)	Pierre-Emile Højbjerg	MF	2012–2014	36	11	2013–2016	17	0	
(Germany)	Mats Hummels	DF	2005–2008	42	5	2007–2008; 2016–2019	75	3	
(Czech Republic)	David Jarolím	MF	1997–2000	62	12	1997–2000	1	0	
(Sweden)	Nils-Eric Johansson	DF	1998–2000	54	1	1999–2000	2	0	
(West Germany)	Thomas Kastenmaier	DF	1987–1989	?	?	1989–1990	9	1	
(Germany)	Ulf Kliche	DF	1987–1992	?	?	1990–1991	0	0	
(Germany)	Thomas Kraft	GK	2006–2011	103	0	2008–2011	12	0	
(Germany)	Toni Kroos	MF	2007–2008	13	4	2007–2014	110	12	
(Germany)	Philipp Lahm	DF	2001–2003	63	3	2005–2017	332	12	
(Germany)	Carsten Lakies	FW	1996–1997	28	22	1996–1997	1	0	
(Germany)	Christian Lell	DF	2001–2010	70	2	2003–2010	65	1	
(Austria)	Stefan Maierhofer	FW	2005–2007	42	21	2006–2007	2	0	
(Bosnia and Herzegovina)	Zvjezdan Misimović	FW	2000–2004	102	44	2002–2004	3	0	
(Germany)	Thomas Müller	FW	2008–2009	35	16	2008–	423	139	
(Germany)	Christian Nerlinger	MF	1990–1993	75	18	1992–1998	156	27	
(Cameroon)	Louis Clément Ngwat-Mahop	FW	2006–2007	33	7	2006–2007	1	0	
(Germany)	Thorsten Ott	FW	1991–1994	?	?	1991–1992	1	0	
(Germany)	Andreas Ottl	MF	2003–2007	78	9	2005–2011	92	5	
(Germany)	Hans Pflügler	DF	1979–1982; 1992–1997; 2001–2002	?	?	1981–1992; 1994–1995	277	36	
(Germany)	Michael Probst	GK	1995–1997	32	0	1995–1996	2	0	
(Germany)	Michael Rensing	GK	2002–2007	114	0	2003–2010	53	0	
(Germany)	Manfred Schwabl	MF	1984–1986	?	?	1985–1986; 1989–1992	87	4	
(Germany)	Bastian Schweinsteiger	MF	2002–2004	34	2	2002–2015	342	45	
(Zambia)	Andrew Sinkala	MF	1999–2001	40	7	1999–2001	1	0	
(Germany)	Oliver Stegmayer	FW	1993–1995	?	?	1994–1995	0	0	
(Germany)	Piotr Trochowski	MF	2002–2003	38	8	2003–2005	13	1	
(Germany)	Sandro Wagner	FW	2005–2008	44	2	2007–2008	4	0	
(Germany)	Stefan Wessels	GK	1998–2002	63	0	1999–2003	6	0	
(Ghana)	Kwasi Okyere Wriedt	FW	2017–2020	96	69	2017–2020	2	0	
(Germany)	Alexander Zickler	FW	1993–1995	21	6	1993–2005	214	51	
(Iran)	Mohammad Reza Adelkhani	FW	1962–1965	?	?	?	0	0	
