= Brian Laudrup =

Danish footballer (born 1969)

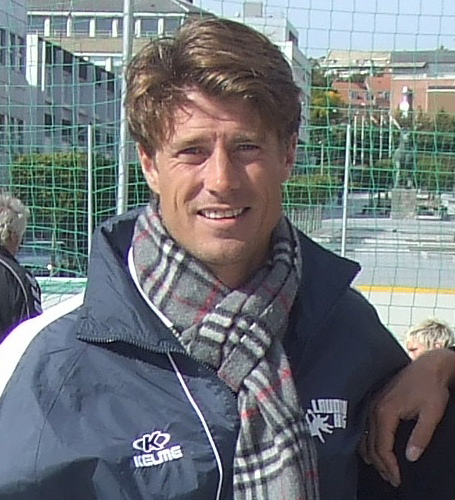
- Laudrup in 2013

Personal information
- Full name: Brian Laudrup
- Date of birth: 22 February 1969 (age 57)
- Place of birth: Vienna, Austria
- Height: 1.86 m (6 ft 1 in)
- Positions: Forward; winger; midfielder

Youth career
- –1986: Brøndby

Senior career*
Years	Team	Apps	(Gls)
1986–1989	Brøndby	49	(13)
1989–1990	Bayer Uerdingen	34	(6)
1990–1992	Bayern Munich	53	(11)
1992–1994	Fiorentina	31	(5)
1993–1994	→ Milan (loan)	9	(1)
1994–1998	Rangers	116	(33)
1998	Chelsea	7	(0)
1998–1999	Copenhagen	12	(2)
1999–2000	Ajax	31	(13)
Total		342	(84)

International career
1984	Denmark U17	6	(0)
1985–1987	Denmark U19	12	(6)
1987–1988	Denmark U21	5	(0)
1987–1998	Denmark	82	(21)
Medal record
Men's football
Representing Denmark
UEFA European Championship
Winner	1992 Sweden
FIFA Confederations Cup
Winner	1995 Saudi Arabia
CONMEBOL–UEFA Cup of Champions
Runner-up	1993 Argentina
- * Club domestic league appearances and goals

Brian Laudrup (Danish pronunciation: [ˈpʁiːæn ˈlɑwˀtʁɔp], born 22 February 1969) is a Danish former professional footballer who played as a forward, winger, or midfielder. He currently works for the various TV sports channels of Scandinavian media network Viaplay. He also manages a football academy for marginalised youth. Laudrup is the son of Danish former footballer Finn Laudrup and the younger brother of footballer Michael Laudrup.

During his playing career which eventually stalled due to injury, Laudrup represented a number of European clubs. He started with Danish club Brøndby, winning two Danish championships in the late 1980s. He then played for German and Italian clubs, winning the 1993–94 Serie A as well as the 1994 UEFA Champions League title with Milan. He was a vital part of the Rangers team which dominated the Scottish Premier Division in the 1990s, winning three championships, among others. He won the 1998 UEFA Super Cup in his brief stint with English club Chelsea, followed by a short spell with Copenhagen in Denmark, before ending his career with Ajax in 2000.

Laudrup also played 82 matches and scored 21 goals for the Denmark national team, and was a vital part of the Danish teams which won UEFA Euro 1992 and the 1995 Confederations Cup.

Laudrup won the Danish Football Player of the Year award a then record four times. It has since been beaten by Christian Eriksen who in 2018 won the award for the fifth time. Laudrup was named by FIFA as the fifth-best player in the world in 1992 and was named by Pelé as one of the top 125 greatest living footballers at the FIFA 100 ceremony in March 2004, alongside his older brother, Michael.

== Early life ==
Brian Laudrup was born into a football family – his father Finn Laudrup was a former Danish international, and his brother Michael Laudrup also became a Danish international. Brian was born in Vienna when his father was playing for Wiener SC.

== Club career ==
=== Brøndby ===
Laudrup began his senior career with Brøndby in Denmark. At Brøndby, he competed with later Danish internationals Claus Nielsen and Bent Christensen for a place in the starting line-up, and formed a great partnership with Nielsen. He won the 1987 and 1988 Danish First Division with the club. Halfway through the 1989 season, Laudrup's contract with Brøndby expired, and he agreed to join German club Bayer Uerdingen. The transfer fee was thought to be around DKK 8 million, the partition of which Brøndby and Brian's father and agent Finn Laudrup disagreed about. The Danish Football Union ruled in favor of Brøndby's claims of around DKK 3.9 million, but the Laudrups paid around DKK 3.3 million, and insisted on not paying the remainder. The case was eventually settled in March 1990.

=== Uerdingen ===
Laudrup joined Uerdingen in order to play in a club with relative little pressure, and also looked to lean on fellow Dane Jan Bartram, who was already at the club. He scored 6 goals in 34 matches during the 1989–90 Bundesliga season, and impressed so much for both club and country that he was named Danish Player of the Year.

Laudrup's performances in the Bundesliga were widely praised. At kicker's biannual ranking of Bundesliga players, Laudrup was rated the league's second-best forward in the second highest category, international class, after Werder Bremen's New Zealander, Wynton Rufer. German sports magazine Sport Bild hailed Laudrup as the 1989–90 season's best signing, ahead of high-profile names including Uwe Bein, Stefan Kuntz and Thomas Strunz.

As he felt the Uerdingen executives would not strengthen the Uerdingen team, Laudrup sought to leave the club in the summer of 1990.

=== Bayern Munich ===
Laudrup's great performances in the Bundesliga and for Denmark attracted Bayern Munich for his signature, who purchased him for a DM6 million transfer fee in May 1990, making him the most expensive Bundesliga player at the time. In his first season, Laudrup scored 9 goals in 33 games as the club finished in second place. Laudrup was also part of the Bayern squad that reached the semi-final of the 1990–91 European Cup.

Laudrup was highly rated among the experts, but he was also very popular in large parts of the German population. In a vote that gave kicker-readers the opportunity to choose their favourite players at individual places and the most popular player, known as "das Idol '90", was won by Laudrup with four times as many votes as Klaus Allofs in second place. By a vote of Sport Bild that 156,000 readers participated in, he received 24,245 votes and was elected the fourth best performer out of 900 candidates among German legionnaires abroad and all players in the 1. and 2. Bundesliga. Only the popular world champions Andreas Brehme, Lothar Matthäus and Rudi Völler received more votes. Laudrup finished ahead of high-profile stars like Thomas Häßler, Jürgen Klinsmann, Andreas Möller, Thomas Doll, Jürgen Kohler, Karl-Heinz Riedle and Matthias Sammer, and so entirely on Bundesliga players, Laudrup took first place.

Laudrup was a consistent performer in his first five matches of the 1991–92 season but suffered a cruciate ligament injury in his right knee in August 1991. Laudrup watched from the stands as the team collapsed in a disastrous season. In December 1991, Laudrup said new Bayern executives Franz Beckenbauer and Karl-Heinz Rummenigge were creating chaos in the team through their public criticism of the younger Bayern players. He returned to the team in February 1992 and played the last 15 matches of the season as Bayern finished in tenth position. Despite the injury-hit season, Laudrup still finished the 1991–92 season being named Danish Player of the Year again for the second time, and finished fifth in the FIFA World Player of the year poll.

=== Fiorentina ===
Laudrup's reputation began to grow and he fulfilled his lifelong ambition when he moved to Serie A (at the time, arguably the top league in the world) to sign for Fiorentina. Fiorentina started the 1992–93 season brilliantly, playing open, flowing and attacking football in the first part of the season. However, a change of manager in the second half of the season was the beginning of the end for Fiorentina. The team as a whole produced mediocre performances, and despite the presence of such other stars as Stefan Effenberg and Gabriel Batistuta, the club was unexpectedly relegated after more than 50-straight years playing in Serie A. Despite the relegation, Laudrup himself had a fairly solid season, and was loaned to Milan for the 1993–94 season.

==== Loan to Milan ====
Laudrup was loaned to Milan for the 1993–94 season, which only saw him play a handful of matches throughout the season due to a squad rotation system at the club, and also because of the three foreigner rule at the time. The world class team of Milan at the time had six other foreigners, namely Marco van Basten (unable to play due to long-term injury), Zvonimir Boban, Dejan Savićević, Jean-Pierre Papin, Florin Răducioiu, and Marcel Desailly, which meant Laudrup could play only sporadically. It was also manager Fabio Capello's very strict system, where he preferred to play more defensive type players rather than the direct play preferred by Laudrup. However, Capello's defensive system proved to work at the end of the season, as Milan won the Scudetto only scoring 36 goals in 34 matches. Laudrup played seven European matches for the 1993–94 UEFA Champions League-winning Milan side. Despite being on contract with Fiorentina until the summer of 1996, Laudrup stated in December 1993 he did not want to return to the club.

=== Rangers ===
In June 1994, Laudrup was offered an escape route from Italy when he was approached by Walter Smith of Rangers. Rangers at that time were an ambitious club and had money to spend to try to seek European glory. This attracted Laudrup, and he signed for a £2.3 million transfer fee.

He made an immediate impact at Rangers. On the opening league fixture of the season against Motherwell in August 1994, it was from his precise cross that Mark Hateley headed the opening goal. In the second half with only a few minutes remaining, he provided another assist with a long run from the half-way line before passing to Duncan Ferguson, who then scored Rangers' second goal to clinch a 2–1 win. He scored his first goal for the club later that same month, in a Scottish League Cup tie against Falkirk. Although Scottish football was more physical than what he was previously used to, he excelled in the free role given to him by manager Walter Smith. Laudrup turned down an offer from Barcelona five months after signing for Rangers. He finished the season with 10 goals in 33 League games, in addition to a number of assists, as Rangers won their seventh consecutive Championship. As recognition of his fine performances, Laudrup won both the Scottish Football Writers and Scottish PFA player of the year awards. His performances for Rangers and Denmark also resulted in his winning his third Danish Player of the Year award.

Laudrup missed a run of nine League games in the early part of season 1995–96 due to an injury sustained in international duty. He returned against Celtic in November 1995 and scored Rangers' first goal in a 3–3 draw at Ibrox. He was also now playing alongside Paul Gascoigne, and the pair were instrumental in Rangers winning their eighth league championship. Laudrup also made a big impact in the latter stages of the Scottish Cup that season. He scored the winning goal in the semi-final against Celtic, playing a one-two with Gordon Durie, before taking control of the ball on his chest and chipping it over the Celtic keeper. In the final against Hearts, Rangers won 5–1. Durie scored a hat-trick, the first-ever Rangers player to do so in the final, but it was Laudrup who won the Man of the Match award, having provided assists for all three of Durie's goals, and scoring the other two himself. The game has since become known as the Laudrup Final.

His third season at Rangers, 1996–97, saw another cup final goal, this time in a 4–3 win over Hearts in the 1996 Scottish League Cup Final. The season's most notable concern was Rangers bid to equal Celtic's record of nine consecutive league titles. With Rangers hampered by a series of niggling injuries to their main strikers, a greater burden for goalscoring was placed on Laudrup. He responded by scoring 16 goals in 33 league games, including the only goal against Celtic in a win in November 1996, and a headed goal in a 1–0 win in May 1997 away at Dundee United which clinched the league title and the club's bid for nine-in-a-row. His performances saw him win the Scottish Football Writers' award once again. His great performances for Rangers and Denmark also made him win his fourth Danish player of the year.

Laudrup was linked with a £5 million move to Ajax in the summer of 1997, but was persuaded to stay with Rangers for one more season to help their bid for a tenth successive league title. However, despite a bright start, the season ended up an anti-climax, with Laudrup failing to match the form of previous seasons. Rangers finished runners-up in the league behind Celtic, and ended the season trophy-less after losing to Hearts in the 1998 Scottish Cup Final. Laudrup left the club shortly afterwards. He later described his time at Rangers as "the four best years of my career".

=== Chelsea ===
Laudrup joined Chelsea in the summer of 1998. There was a possibility of Laudrup becoming a Manchester Utd player when Alex Ferguson phoned Brian about coming to Old Trafford. Laudrup said: "I had to tell him that he called a day late, because I had just signed with Chelsea".

However, he very quickly had reservations, and tried to get out of his contract before he even kicked a ball for Chelsea, informing them about this prior to the 1998 World Cup. Chelsea were not accommodating and told Laudrup they would go to court or involve FIFA and UEFA if the contract was not honoured.

Laudrup relented and become a Chelsea player, but was very open that he was unhappy in London and with the squad rotation system policy. "I would have thought twice about signing for Chelsea if I had known," he said. He added: "When I first discussed terms with Chelsea in February, nobody told me about this system if I'd known about it I would have brought it up" and concluded: "I don't like the system of rotation."

He made his debut as Chelsea won the 1998 UEFA Super Cup. He did not play many matches due to a combination of injury, the squad rotation system that Chelsea had where no player was guaranteed to be in the starting line up, and also because of his fall-out with the club. Laudrup provided an assist in the 4–3 victory against Blackburn Rovers at Ewood Park after coming off the substitutes' bench to equalize 3–3. Laudrup provided another assist in the 2–0 victory against Middlesbrough at Stamford Bridge.

Laudrup's only Chelsea goal came in the UEFA Cup Winners' Cup to give Chelsea a valuable 1–0 away win against Copenhagen to send Chelsea through to the quarter-finals. It was also his last match for the London club. Manager Gianluca Vialli had no hesitation about playing Laudrup against Copenhagen despite his unhappiness at the club, stating: "I've always had faith in Brian. I knew before the game he was having a quite difficult time with all that was going on but he's been outstanding in training and previous matches and he responded very well. He's been professional and the goal was the right reward for him." After the tie, he ironically moved on to Copenhagen, who had negotiated a deal during the time of their two games against Chelsea.

Although Laudrup's time at Chelsea was brief, his performances were praised, and he kept a professional attitude when called into action despite being personally unhappy in London.

Former Chelsea teammate Graham Le Saux later named Laudrup in his greatest ever XI.

=== Copenhagen ===
Laudrup moved back to Denmark in the spring of 1999 for a brief spell with Copenhagen. Playing for the main rivals of former club Brøndby, he was unceremoniously booed by the home fans when he revisited the Brøndby Stadium in March 1999, and was also harassed by fans from other Danish clubs.

=== Ajax ===
Family problems resulted in Laudrup joining Ajax. Laudrup's registration had reverted to Chelsea after leaving Copenhagen, therefore Ajax and Chelsea had to negotiate a transfer fee. He said: "I had offers from 15 clubs and I have the feeling that Ajax is the right club for me. I didn't enjoy playing with Copenhagen. I had the same problems there that I had with Chelsea; I could not show more than 70% of my real self." Ajax head coach Jan Wouters, who spent a season with Laudrup at Bayern Munich, added: "I like Brian a lot because he can adapt and play several positions." After one individually successful season from 1999 to 2000, scoring 15 goals in 38 matches, Laudrup could not play another season due to injuries. He was forced to retire from top-level football at age 31 after one of the most successful careers in Danish football.

== International career ==
Laudrup made his international debut for the Denmark under-17 team in July 1984, and played six matches for the team until October that year. From October 1985 to August 1987, he played 12 matches and scored 6 goals for the under-19 team. He also represented the under-21s in five games from June 1987 to November 1988. He was called up for the senior Denmark national team by coach Sepp Piontek in April 1987 as a replacement for his brother Michael, but did not receive his debut.

=== Senior debut ===
Laudrup was included in the senior Danish "Olympic national team" of under-21 coach Richard Møller Nielsen, and took part in three qualification matches for the 1988 Summer Olympics. He made his debut on 18 November 1987, at age 18, in a 1–0 defeat to West Germany, with Bjarne Goldbæk also debuting in that match. Laudrup scored his first national team goal in his third game, a 4–0 win against Greece on 20 April 1988. He was then included as a part of coach Piontek's selection ahead of the UEFA Euro 1988. He came on as a substitute in a friendly match against Austria in April 1988, but broke his collarbone just before the final Euro 1988 squad was named.

Laudrup was recalled to the senior national team in February 1989, and became a mainstay in the team under new national team coach Richard Møller Nielsen. He scored three goals in four matches as Denmark narrowly missed qualification for the 1990 FIFA World Cup. During the dispute with Brøndby over his transfer fee, it was discussed whether the Danish Football Union should ban Laudrup from the national team. Following three matches in the qualification campaign for the Euro 1992, Laudrup opted to quit the national team in November 1990 alongside his brother Michael and Jan Bartram, as he lacked respect for coach Nielsen.

=== European champion at Euro 1992 ===
Laudrup returned to the national team under coach Nielsen in April 1992. In 1992, Laudrup travelled with the Danish national team to Euro 1992 in Sweden, and in a strictly defensive strategy, Laudrup was one of the few attacking players. Though he did not score a single goal in the competition, his skill and speed was an important part of the Danish team that went on to win the tournament, and Laudrup was voted a shared fifth in the 1992 FIFA World Player of the Year poll, with fellow Dane Peter Schmeichel, though he had the edge over Schmeichel in the domestic polls, where Laudrup won his second Danish Player of the Year award in 1992.

Laudrup scored 2 goals in 12 matches as Denmark were edged out of participation at the 1994 World Cup by Spain and the Republic of Ireland. During the World Cup qualification, Michael Laudrup had re-entered the team.

=== Confederations Cup 95 success ===
Laudrup was a vital part of the Danish team that won the Confederations Cup in 1995. He scored a remarkable individual goal in the 2–0 win over Saudi Arabia which saw him beat three defenders before slotting it into the net from a wide angle. The goal is rated by FIFA as one of the greatest goals ever scored in the history of the competition. Denmark defeated Argentina in the final 2–0, with Laudrup providing an excellent dribble down the wing to assist in the second goal. Laudrup won the Golden Ball award naming him the best player of the tournament.

=== Euro 1996 participation ===
Laudrup helped Denmark qualify for Euro 1996, though the tournament was a disappointment for the defending champions. Laudrup was a highlight for the Danes scoring three goals in as many matches, including two against Turkey, but the team was eliminated in the preliminary group stage.

=== World Cup 98 participation ===
With four goals in seven matches, Laudrup was an important part of the Danish team that qualified for the 1998 World Cup, the only World Cup of his career. He shone at the tournament, scoring two goals and gathering three assists. He saw Denmark through to the quarter-finals with a goal in the 4–1 surprise thrashing of Nigeria in the first knock-out round. The quarter-final was his last match for Denmark, where they were defeated 3–2 by eventual runners-up Brazil, despite Laudrup setting-up the first goal to make it 1–0, and scoring to the top near corner of the goal to level the match at 2–2. Until the Brazil match, when Laudrup had scored for Denmark, they had never lost.

The quarter-final was the best ever Danish result at a World Cup, and Laudrup later ranked the 1998 Denmark team higher than the Euro 1992-winning side. He was named as one of the 16 players selected by FIFA as the "All Star Team" of the World Cup, alongside his brother Michael. After the tournament, Laudrup decided to end his national team career, having played in 82 matches, scoring 21 goals over the course of 11 years.

== Player profile ==
=== Style of play ===
Laudrup was an elegant, technical and creative player who was gifted with tremendous pace and ball control. He used this talent, offensive capabilities and acceleration to dribble at speed and beat players with relative ease to create openings for teammates. Although he was a powerful and accurate striker of the ball, who was capable of finishing well and scoring with either foot as well as with his head, Laudrup was also known to be a very unselfish player with excellent vision who would often take more pleasure in setting-up teammates rather than going for goal himself. Regarding Laudrup's unselfishness, John Greig commented: "Apart from applying the ammunition, Laudrup was also capable of scoring his share of goals, but I genuinely believe that he was embarrassed about scoring. He seemed to derive much more pleasure from making goals". A versatile player, Laudrup was capable of playing in several attacking and midfield positions; his preferred position was in a free role, as a winger on either flank, or in the centre, as an attacking midfielder behind the forwards, with licence to roam. He was also deployed as a midfielder, as a deep-lying forward, or even as a striker on occasion throughout his career. Despite his skill and ability, his consistency and mentality was occasionally brought into question throughout his career.

=== Reception ===
Laudrup has been praised by several players, managers, pundits, and footballing figures for his footballing ability, including Charlie Nicholas, Roland Wohlfarth, Ally McCoist, and Andy Goram. Franz Beckenbauer described Laudrup as "a world class player", a view shared by Andreas Brehme, who described him as a "player of the highest quality class". Paul Gascoigne instead dubbed him an "amazing player". Laudrup's older brother, Michael, likened Brian's playing style to his own, and even believed his younger brother to be superior to himself. His former manager Horst Wohlers named him as the best player he had ever coached, and as the top footballer in the Bundesliga during their time together at Bayer Uerdingen. In December 2013, Graeme Le Saux named Luís Figo and Brian Laudrup as his toughest opponents ever. Walter Smith's view of Laudrup was more critical however, lauding his ability but also lamenting his mentality, which he believed limited him as a player, commenting: "Brian Laudrup is as good a player as I have ever worked with, but he frustrated me. He had the capability of being up there with the greatest players of all time. There was just that little bit in him mentally that stopped him from being right at the very top. Make no mistake, he was a fantastic player for us, but he could have elevated himself into a position where he was one of the best in the world."

== Career after football ==
Laudrup now works as a pundit and co-commentator for Discovery Networks Denmark, covering the Premier League and Denmark national team. He formerly covered the UEFA Champions League in the same role for Danish TV3+.

He is also involved with the so-called "Laudrup & Høgh ProCamp", a youth football camp, co–coached with former national team goalkeeper Lars Høgh.

In his spare time, he played for Lyngby's Old Boys side alongside Michael Laudrup.

== Personal life ==
Laudrup is married to Mette and has a son, Nicolai, and a daughter, Rasmine.

On 7 September 2010, he announced that he had lymphoma and was undergoing treatment. Three months after the start of the treatment, he was told there were no signs of the disease.

== Career statistics ==
=== Club ===
Appearances and goals by club, season and competition
Club	Season	League			National Cup		League Cup		Continental		Other		Total	
Club	Season	Division	Apps	Goals	Apps	Goals	Apps	Goals	Apps	Goals	Apps	Goals	Apps	Goals
Brøndby	1986	1st Division	2	0			–		0	0	–		2	0
Brøndby	1987	1st Division	24	11			–		4 (Note: Appearances in UEFA Cup)	0	–		28	11
Brøndby	1988	1st Division	12	0			–		0	0	–		12	0
Brøndby	1989	1st Division	11	2			–		0	0	–		11	2
Brøndby	Total		49	13			0	0	4	0	0	0	53	13
Bayer Uerdingen	1989–90	Bundesliga	34	6	1	0	–		–		–		35	6
Bayern Munich	1990–91	Bundesliga	33	9	1	0	–		7 (Note: Appearances in European Cup)	0	1 (Note: Appearance in DFB-Supercup)	0	42	9
Bayern Munich	1991–92	Bundesliga	20	2	1	0	–		0	0	–		21	2
Bayern Munich	Total		53	11	2	0	0	0	7	0	1	0	63	11
Fiorentina	1992–93	Serie A	31	5	4	1	–		–		–		35	6
AC Milan (loan)	1993–94	Serie A	9	1	2	0	–		6 (Note: Appearances in UEFA Champions League)	1	1 (Note: Appearance in UEFA Super Cup)	0	18	2
Rangers	1994–95	Scottish Premier Division	33	10	2	2	1	1	2	0	–		38	13
Rangers	1995–96	Scottish Premier Division	22	2	5	3	1	0	5	1	–		33	6
Rangers	1996–97	Scottish Premier Division	33	16	2	0	2	2	6	2	–		43	20
Rangers	1997–98	Scottish Premier Division	28	5	4	0	0	0	4	0	–		36	5
Rangers	Total		116	33	13	5	4	3	17	3	0	0	150	44
Chelsea	1998–99	Premier League	7	0	0	0	0	0	3 (Note: Appearances in UEFA Cup Winners' Cup)	1	1	0	11	1
Copenhagen	1998–99	Danish Superliga	12	2			–		0	0	–		12	2
Ajax	1999–2000	Eredivisie	31	13	1	0	–		5	2	1 (Note: Appearance in Johan Cruyff Shield)	0	38	15
Career total			342	84	23	6	4	3	42	7	4	0	415	100

== Honours ==
Brøndby

- Danish 1st Division: 1987, 1988

Bayern Munich

- DFL-Supercup: 1990

AC Milan

- Serie A: 1993–94
- UEFA Champions League: 1993–94

Rangers

- Scottish Premier Division: 1994–95, 1995–96, 1996–97
- Scottish Cup: 1995–96
- Scottish League Cup: 1996–97

Chelsea

- UEFA Super Cup: 1998

Denmark

- UEFA European Championship: 1992
- FIFA Confederations Cup: 1995

Individual awards and nominations

- Danish Player of the Year: 1989, 1992, 1995, 1997
- kicker Bundesliga Team of the Season: 1989–90
- kicker Bundesliga Best Forward (2nd): 1989–90
- kicker Bundesliga Best Forward (1st): 1990–91
- kicker Bundesliga Best Attacking Midfielder (3rd): 1992
- UEFA European Championship Team of the Tournament: 1992
- FIFA World Player of the Year (5th): 1992
- Ballon d'Or: 1992 (6th), 1996 (28th), 1998 (23rd)
- Best Player (FIFA Confederations Cup): 1995 (then known as King Fahd cup)
- SFWA Footballer of the Year: 1994–95, 1996–97
- SPFA Players' Player of the Year: 1994–95
- SPFA Team of the Year: 1994
- 1998 FIFA World Cup All-star team
- FIFA 100
- Denmark Hall of Fame
- Scottish Football Hall of Fame
- Brondby Wall of Honour
- Glasgow Rangers Hall of Fame
