= 1990 DFB-Supercup =

- Match programme cover
Bayern Munich	1. FC Kaiserslautern
4	1
- Date: 31 July 1990
- Venue: Wildparkstadion, Karlsruhe
- Referee: Hans-Jürgen Weber (Essen)
- Attendance: 27,000

The 1990 DFB-Supercup was the fourth DFB-Supercup, an annual football match contested by the winners of the previous season's Bundesliga and DFB-Pokal competitions.

The match was played at the Wildparkstadion, Karlsruhe, and contested by league champions Bayern Munich and cup winners 1. FC Kaiserslautern.

== Teams ==
Team	Qualification	Previous appearances (bold indicates winners)
Bayern Munich	1989–90 Bundesliga champions	2 (**1987**, 1989)
1. FC Kaiserslautern	1989–90 DFB-Pokal winners	None

== Match ==
=== Details ===
31 July 1990
20:00 CEST

Bayern Munich	4–1	1. FC Kaiserslautern
Reuter 6'; Kohler 19'; Bender 28'; Strunz 45'	Report	Kuntz 62'

Wildparkstadion, Karlsruhe
Attendance: 27,000
Referee: Hans-Jürgen Weber (Essen)

**Bayern Munich**	**1. FC Kaiserslautern**

GK	1	(West Germany) Raimond Aumann
SW	5	(West Germany) Klaus Augenthaler (c)
CB	4	(West Germany) Roland Grahammer
CB	6	(West Germany) Jürgen Kohler
CB	3	(West Germany) Hans Pflügler
RM	7	(West Germany) Stefan Reuter
CM	2	(West Germany) Thomas Strunz
CM	8	(West Germany) Manfred Bender	(substituted off) 68'
LM	10	(West Germany) Stefan Effenberg
CF	11	(Denmark) Brian Laudrup
CF	9	(Socialist Federal Republic of Yugoslavia) Radmilo Mihajlović	(substituted off) 74'
Substitutes:
MF	13	(West Germany) Michael Sternkopf	(substituted on) 68'
FW	14	(West Germany) Roland Wohlfarth	(substituted on) 74'
Manager:
(West Germany) Jupp Heynckes

GK	1	(West Germany) Gerald Ehrmann
SW	2	(West Germany) Reinhard Stumpf	(substituted off) 30'
CB	3	(Czechoslovakia) Miroslav Kadlec
CB	4	(West Germany) Roger Lutz
RWB	5	(West Germany) Uwe Scherr	(substituted off) 56'
LWB	7	(West Germany) Markus Kranz
CM	6	(United States) Thomas Dooley
CM	10	(West Germany) Rainer Ernst
CM	8	(West Germany) Markus Schupp
CF	11	(Socialist Federal Republic of Yugoslavia) Demir Hotić
CF	9	(West Germany) Stefan Kuntz (c)
Substitutes:
DF	13	(West Germany) Axel Roos	(substituted on) 30'
MF	14	(West Germany) Guido Hoffmann	(substituted on) 56'
Manager:
(West Germany) Karl-Heinz Feldkamp

== See also ==
- 1990–91 Bundesliga
- 1990–91 DFB-Pokal
- Deutschland-Cup (football)
