= Stefan Effenberg =

German footballer

Personal information
- Date of birth: 2 August 1968 (age 58)
- Place of birth: Hamburg, West Germany
- Height: 1.88 m (6 ft 2 in)
- Position: Midfielder

Youth career
- –1974: Bramfelder SV (de)
- 1974–1986: Victoria Hamburg
- 1986–1987: Borussia Mönchengladbach

Senior career*
Years	Team	Apps	(Gls)
1987–1990	Borussia Mönchengladbach	73	(10)
1990–1992	Bayern Munich	65	(19)
1992–1994	Fiorentina	56	(12)
1994–1998	Borussia Mönchengladbach	118	(23)
1998–2002	Bayern Munich	95	(16)
2002–2003	VfL Wolfsburg	19	(3)
2003–2004	Al-Arabi	15	(4)
Total		441	(87)

International career
1988–1990	West Germany U21	5	(1)
1991–1998	Germany	35	(5)

Managerial career
- 2015–2016: SC Paderborn
- 2019–2020: KFC Uerdingen 05 (sporting director)
Medal record
Men's football
Representing Germany
UEFA European Championship
Runner-up	1992 Sweden
- * Club domestic league appearances and goals

Stefan Effenberg (German pronunciation: [ˈʃtɛfan ˈʔɛfn̩bɛʁk]; born 2 August 1968) is a German football pundit and former professional player. Nicknamed Der Tiger (IPA: [deːɐ̯ ˈtiːɡɐ]), he was known for his leadership skills, passing range, long-range shooting and physical strength as an iconic midfielder of his time, but was also a temperamental and controversial character.

In the Bundesliga alone – where he most notably represented Bayern Munich in six seasons across two different spells – Effenberg collected 109 yellow cards, an all-time record at the time of his retirement. With Bayern, he won three Bundesliga titles and captained the club to the UEFA Champions League title in 2001.

Effenberg appeared for Germany 35 times and at two international tournaments, UEFA Euro 1992 and the 1994 FIFA World Cup. His international career was marred by frequent run-ins with management.

== Club career ==
Born and raised in Niendorf, Hamburg on 2 August 1968, Effenberg started his professional career with Borussia Mönchengladbach, where he became an undisputed first-choice by the age of 20. This attracted the interest of Bundesliga giants FC Bayern Munich, where he scored 19 goals in his first two seasons after his transfer, although the club failed to win any silverware with Effenberg in the lineup.

When Lothar Matthäus, who also represented Mönchengladbach, returned to Bayern in 1992, Effenberg moved to ACF Fiorentina. Despite the presence of Brian Laudrup and Gabriel Batistuta, Fiorentina was relegated from Serie A in his first season. Effenberg stayed on in the second flight, winning promotion back at the first attempt.

In the summer of 1994, Effenberg then moved back to Gladbach, where he appeared in 118 league matches, scoring 23 goals, before Bayern re-signed him in 1998. Effenberg's second spell with the Bavarians was much more successful. He collected three Bundesliga titles in a row, and Bayern also reached two UEFA Champions League finals, the first of which was a 2–1 defeat to Manchester United F.C. in 1999. Bayern returned to the final in 2001 with Effenberg as captain. He scored Bayern's equalising goal from the penalty spot in a victory against Valencia (1–1, penalty shootout win). After the final, Effenberg was named the Most Valuable Player of the 2000–01 UEFA Champions League. After his departure, club fans voted him one of the eleven greatest Bayern players of all time.

After an unsuccessful spell at VfL Wolfsburg, Effenberg ended his career in Qatar with Al-Arabi Sports Club, with Gabriel Batistuta as his teammate. He appeared occasionally as a color commentator for German TV after his retirement as a player.

== Managerial career ==
Effenberg was appointed as the head coach of SC Paderborn on 13 October 2015. He was sacked on 3 March 2016.

On 10 October 2019, KFC Uerdingen 05 presented Effenberg as the new sporting director. Following a few troubled months which included the team briefly staying at an Italian hotel with no football pitch for a mid-season training camp, he stepped back from this position prematurely in May 2020.

== International career ==
Effenberg played 35 games for the Germany national team and scored five goals. His debut came on 5 June 1991, in a Euro 1992 qualifier against Wales, as he played the last 18 minutes of a 1–0 away loss. He would be an everpresent fixture during the final stages, even netting in the second group stage match, a 2–0 win over Scotland.

During a group game against South Korea in the 1994 FIFA World Cup. Effenberg "gave the finger" to German fans at the Cotton Bowl in the 35 °C (95 °F) heat of Dallas when he got substituted after a subpar performance; the Germans were then only one goal up, after leading 3–0. German coach Berti Vogts was so outraged by this incident that he dropped Effenberg from the team on the spot, and declared that he was finished as an international player.

Effenberg did not appear in another international match again until 1998, when he was briefly reinstated to the national team for a couple of friendly matches in Malta in September, which happened to be Vogts' last two matches as national team coach. They turned out to be Effenberg's last caps for Germany.

== Controversies and personal life ==
Effenberg had a history of attracting attention and ire from fans, managers, and players alike with his behaviour.

In 1991, prior to a UEFA Cup game against then-semi-professional Cork City, Effenberg told the press he was sure of a victory, saying Cork City midfielder Dave Barry was "like (his) grandfather". Barry got his retribution by scoring the opening goal in the team's 1–1 draw at Musgrave Park.

In the late 1990s, Effenberg, already married to Martina, provoked animosity when his affair with Claudia Strunz, the wife of former club and national teammate Thomas Strunz, was revealed. Effenberg published a controversial autobiography, notorious for its blatant contents – which included lashing out at some other football professionals, namely club and national teammate Lothar Matthäus.

In 2001, Effenberg was fined after being found guilty of assaulting a woman in a nightclub. The following year, he implied that unemployed people in Germany were too lazy to look for work, and demanded they took benefit cuts. The interview was issued in Playboy.

Strunz and Effenberg were married in 2004, and the player also had three children from his first marriage; the couple then relocated to Florida.

== Career statistics ==
=== Club ===
Appearances and goals by club, season and competition
Club	Season	League			National Cup		League Cup		Continental		Other		Total	
Club	Season	Division	Apps	Goals	Apps	Goals	Apps	Goals	Apps	Goals	Apps	Goals	Apps	Goals
Borussia Mönchengladbach	1987–88	Bundesliga	15	1	—		—		—		–		15	1
Borussia Mönchengladbach	1988–89	Bundesliga	29	3	2	0	—		—		–		31	3
Borussia Mönchengladbach	1989–90	Bundesliga	29	6	3	0	—		—		–		32	6
Borussia Mönchengladbach	Total		73	10	5	0	0	0	0	0	0	0	78	10
Bayern Munich	1990–91	Bundesliga	32	9	1	0	—		8	1	1 (Note: Appearance in DFB-Supercup)	0	42	10
Bayern Munich	1991–92	Bundesliga	33	10	1	0	—		4	1	–		38	11
Bayern Munich	Total		65	19	2	0	0	0	12	2	1	0	80	21
Fiorentina	1992–93	Serie A	30	5	4	2	—		—		–		34	7
Fiorentina	1993–94	Serie B	26	7	4	0	—		—		–		30	7
Fiorentina	Total		56	12	8	2	0	0	0	0	0	0	64	14
Borussia Mönchengladbach	1994–95	Bundesliga	30	7	5	2	—		—		–		35	9
Borussia Mönchengladbach	1995–96	Bundesliga	31	7	2	1	—		6	3	1	0	40	11
Borussia Mönchengladbach	1996–97	Bundesliga	29	1	2	0	—		3	2	–		34	3
Borussia Mönchengladbach	1997–98	Bundesliga	28	8	1	0	—		—		–		29	8
Borussia Mönchengladbach	Total		118	23	10	3	0	0	9	5	1	0	138	31
Bayern Munich	1998–99	Bundesliga	31	8	6	3	2	0	12	5	–		51	16
Bayern Munich	1999–2000	Bundesliga	27	2	5	0	1	0	11	2	–		44	4
Bayern Munich	2000–01	Bundesliga	20	4	—		—		10	1	–		30	5
Bayern Munich	2001–02	Bundesliga	17	2	4	0	1	0	7	1	–		29	3
Bayern Munich	Total		95	16	15	3	4	0	40	9	0	0	154	28
VfL Wolfsburg	2002–03	Bundesliga	19	3	2	0	—		—		—		21	3
Al-Arabi	2003–04	Qatar Stars League	15	4	—		—		—		–		15	4
Career total			441	87	42	8	4	0	61	16	2	0	550	111

=== International ===
Appearances and goals by national team and year
National team	Year	Apps	Goals
Germany	1991	4	0
Germany	1992	12	2
Germany	1993	11	3
Germany	1994	6	0
Germany	1995	0	0
Germany	1996	0	0
Germany	1997	0	0
Germany	1998	2	0
Total		35	5

Scores and results list Germany's goal tally first, score column indicates score after each Effenberg goal.

List of international goals scored by Stefan Effenberg
No.	Date	Venue	Opponent	Score	Result	Competition
1	15 June 1992	Idrottsparken, Norrköping, Sweden	Scotland	2–0	2–0	UEFA Euro 1992
2	9 September 1992	Parken Stadium, Copenhagen, Denmark	Denmark	2–1	2–1	Friendly
3	14 April 1993	Ruhrstadion, Bochum, Germany	Ghana	2–1	6–1	Friendly
4	14 April 1993	Ruhrstadion, Bochum, Germany	Ghana	4–1	6–1	Friendly
5	19 June 1993	Silverdome, Detroit, United States	England	1–0	2–1	U.S. Cup

=== Managerial ===
Team	Nat	From	To	Record				
Team	Nat	From	To	G	W	D	L	Win %
Paderborn 07	(Germany)	13 October 2015	2 March 2016	15	2	6	7	13.33
Total				15	2	6	7	13.33

== Honours ==
Bayern Munich

- Bundesliga: 1998–99, 1999–2000, 2000–01
- DFB-Pokal: 1999–2000
- DFB-Supercup: 1990
- DFB-Ligapokal: 1998, 1999, 2000
- UEFA Champions League: 2000–01
- Intercontinental Cup: 2001

Fiorentina

- Serie B: 1993–94

Borussia Mönchengladbach

- DFB-Pokal: 1994–95

Germany

- UEFA European Championship runner-up: 1992
- U.S. Cup: 1993

Individual

- kicker Bundesliga Team of the Season: 1990–91, 1991–92, 1994–95, 1995–96, 1996–97, 1997–98, 1999–2000
- UEFA European Championship Team of the Tournament: 1992
- World XI: 1997
- ESM Team of the Year: 1998–99
- Ballon d'Or nominee: 1999, 2001
- UEFA Club Footballer of the Year: 2001
- Bayern Munich All-time XI: 2005
