= SV Vötting-Weihenstephan =

German football club

- Full name: SV Vötting-Weihenstephan 1948
- Nickname: SV Vötting
- Founded: 1948
- Stadium: Sportplatz Vöttinger Weiher
- Capacity: 1,000
- Coordinates: 48°23'19.3"N 11°43'06.5"E
- Chairman: Markus Schappert
- Manager: Maximilian Peschek
- League: Kreisliga, Kreisklasse 3, Kreis Donau/Isar
- 2021/2022: 1st
- Website: www.sv-voetting.de

Sport Verein Vötting-Weihenstephan e.V 1948 is a sports club based in Freising, Germany. The club was founded on March 17, 1948. It is best known for its men's football team which currently plays in the Kreisliga (Kreisklasse 3, Kreis Donau/Isar).

== Players ==
=== First-team squad ===
As of 28 January 2023

Note: Flags indicate national team as defined under FIFA eligibility rules; some limited exceptions apply. Players may hold more than one non-FIFA nationality.

No.	Pos.	Nation	Player
12	GK	GER	Jakob Hutter
22	GK	GER	Fabio Ordnung
39	DF	GER	Conrad Carl Czuprin
—	DF	GER	Jannis Göft-Michaelis
33	DF	GER	Michael Kronthaler
3	DF	GER	Luca Minette
17	DF	GER	Christian Pfluegler
18	DF	GER	Tobias Stable
5	DF	GER	Sebastian Steger
2	DF	GER	Philipp Weinberger
7	MF	GER	Leander Baumgarten
6	MF	GER	Jakob Herrmann
8	MF	GER	Daniel Hesse
27	MF	GER	Philipp Meyer
23	MF	GER	Felix Pfeilmeier
31	MF	GER	Petar Projic
19	MF	GER	Noah Rock
26	MF	GER	Jacob Thalhuber
21	MF	GER	Jonathan Then
4	MF	GER	Daniel Willig
9	FW	GER	Adrian Berlinghoff
13	FW	GER	Daniel Busch
10	FW	GER	Michael Eberl
—	FW	GER	Andreas Fretz
—	FW	GER	Sebastian Pflügler
15	FW	GER	Jonas Sittenauer
—	FW	GER	Sebastian Stable

=== Notable players ===
- Hans Pflügler began his youth career at SV Vötting-Weihenstephan, playing there from 1967 to 1975. He would go on to play for Bayern Munich, winning ten major titles and appearing in nearly 400 official games. Additionally Pflügler represented West Germany at the Euro 1988 and 1990 World Cup, winning the tournament.
