= Manfred Bender =

German footballer (born 1966)

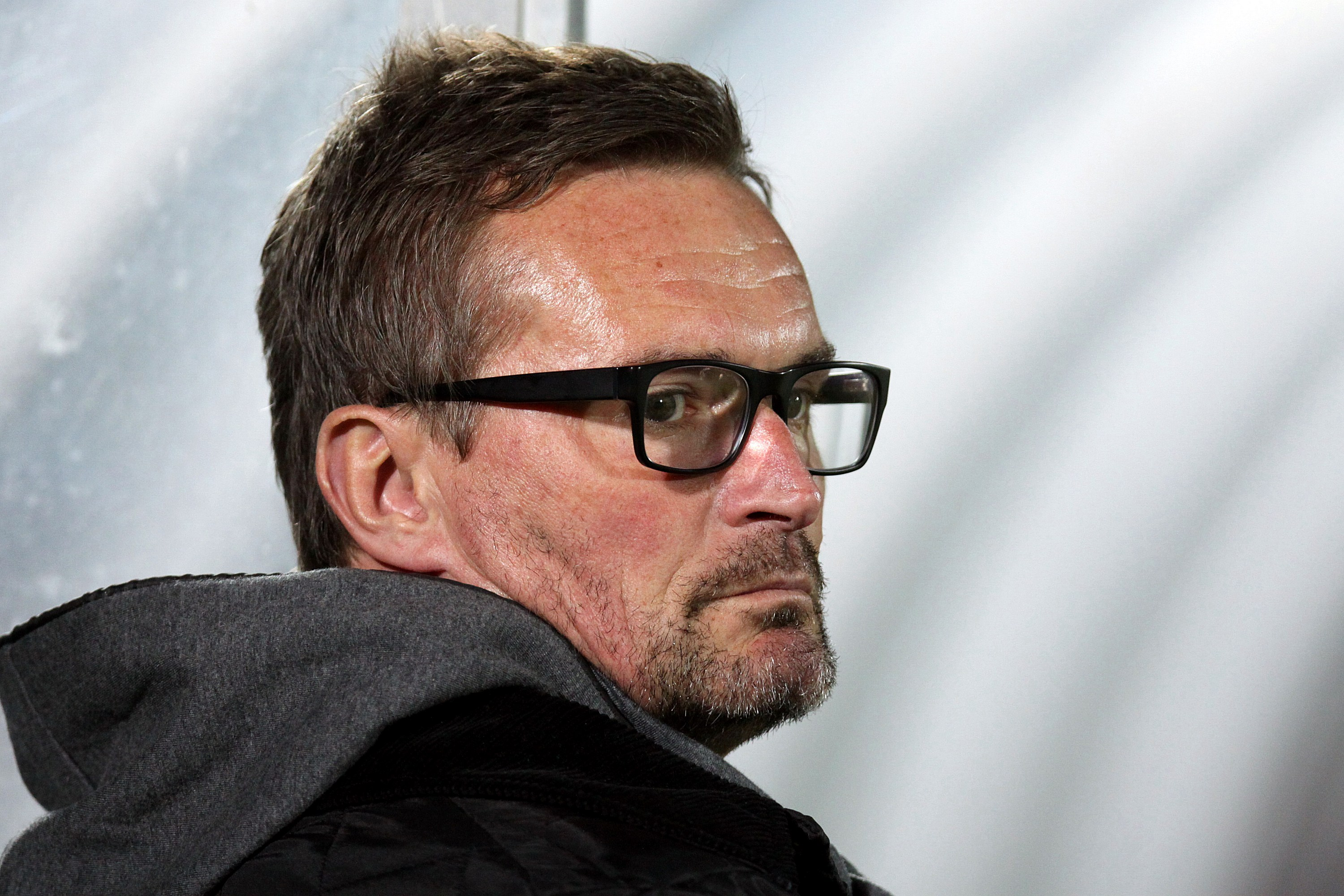
- Bender in 2015

Personal information
- Date of birth: 24 May 1966 (age 60)
- Place of birth: Munich, West Germany
- Height: 1.89 m (6 ft 2 in)
- Position: Midfielder

Youth career
- MSV München
- TB München

Senior career*
Years	Team	Apps	(Gls)
1985–1989	SpVgg Unterhaching		
1989–1992	Bayern Munich	77	(9)
1992–1996	Karlsruher SC	101	(29)
1996–1999	1860 Munich	51	(4)
1999–2000	Karlsruher SC	2	(0)
2000–2003	1. FC Saarbrücken	47	(9)
2003	SV Wilhelmshaven	16	(2)
2003–2004	FC Ismaning	17	(4)
2005	TSV Eching		

Managerial career
- 2006–2007: 1. FC Vöcklabruck
- 2007–2008: SCR Altach
- 2010–2011: Nigeria U-20
- 2011–: Nigeria (fitness coach)
- 2013: Kickers Offenbach (executive director)
- 2013–2014: Austria Klagenfurt (athletic supervisor)
- 2014–2016: Austria Klagenfurt
- * Club domestic league appearances and goals

Manfred Bender (born 24 May 1966) is a German football manager and former player. He last managed Austria Klagenfurt. Between 1989 and 1999 he played for FC Bayern Munich, Karlsruher SC and 1860 Munich. In total Bender played 229 games in the Bundesliga, scoring 42 goals. Bender is most fondly remembered for a goal scored against Oliver Kahn and Bayern Munich in the Bundesliga.

== Career ==
Bender's career began in the second level of the Bundesliga, playing for SpVgg Unterhaching. In 1989, he moved to FC Bayern Munich. He was considered an emerging talent of the same style as Jürgen Kohler, Alan McInally and Radmilo Mihajlovic. With Bayern Munich, he won the 1990 DFB-Supercup.

The 1991–92 season was tumultuous for Bayern, who finished just five points above the relegation places. Bender moved to Karlsruher SC ahead of the new season in a direct swap with Mehmet Scholl.

With Karlsruher SC, Bender reached the 1996 German Cup final and won the 1996 UEFA Intertonto Cup.

Ahead of the 1996–97 season, Bender transferred to TSV 1860 Munich where he played for three seasons. In his final season at the club, Bender saw only six full matches. He then returned to Karlsruher SC for a single season, followed by two seasons at 1. FC Saarbrücken, a second-league team. Bender spent the remainder of his career playing in a number of German lower-league teams before embracing a career in coaching.

In February 2011, Bender was appointed fitness trainer for the Nigerian national team.
