= Andreas Wagenhaus =

German footballer

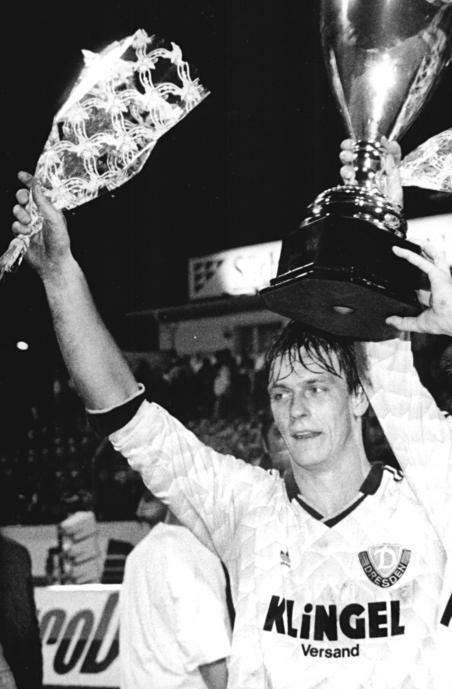
- Wagenhaus celebrates winning the Deutschland Cup in 1990

Personal information
- Date of birth: 29 October 1964 (age 61)
- Place of birth: Naumburg, East Germany
- Position: Defender

Youth career
- 1977–1982: Hallescher FC Chemie

Senior career*
Years	Team	Apps	(Gls)
1982–1989	Hallescher FC Chemie	123	(16)
1989–1993	Dynamo Dresden	89	(4)
1993–1994	Fenerbahçe	18	(1)
1994–1996	Waldhof Mannheim	51	(4)
1996–1997	FC Gossau		
1997–1998	VfL Halle 96	27	(5)

International career
1990	East Germany	3	(0)
- * Club domestic league appearances and goals

Andreas Wagenhaus (born 29 October 1964) is a German former professional footballer who played as a defender.

Wagenhaus played in each of the first two levels of the East and unified German Football league pyramid at least 50 matches.

In the last year of the East Germany national team he won three caps.

== Honours ==
Dynamo Dresden

- DDR-Oberliga: 1989, 1990
- FDGB-Pokal: 1990
- UEFA Cup semi-finalist 1989
- Deutschland Cup: 1990

Fenerbahçe

- Süper Lig runners-up: 1993–94
- Başbakanlık Kupası: 1993
