= Marco Zernicke =

German footballer

Personal information
- Date of birth: 5 December 1969 (age 56)
- Place of birth: West Germany
- Position: Left wing-back

Youth career
- VfB Hermsdorf

Senior career*
Years	Team	Apps	(Gls)
1987–1994	Hertha BSC	136	(17)
1994–2000	Fortuna Köln	113	(8)
2000–2002	Alemannia Aachen	31	(3)
Total		280	(28)
- * Club domestic league appearances and goals

Marco Zernicke (born December 5, 1969) is a German former footballer.
