= Roland Grahammer =

German footballer (born 1963)

Personal information
- Date of birth: 3 November 1963 (age 62)
- Place of birth: Augsburg, West Germany
- Height: 1.78 m (5 ft 10 in)
- Position: Defender

Youth career
- 1969–1976: SpVgg Bärenkeller
- 1976–1982: FC Augsburg

Senior career*
Years	Team	Apps	(Gls)
1982–1983	FC Augsburg	34	(2)
1983–1988	1. FC Nürnberg	149	(19)
1988–1994	FC Bayern Munich	102	(2)
Total		285	(23)

International career
1980	West Germany U-18	1	(0)
1984	West Germany U-21	2	(0)
1987–1988	West Germany Olympic	14	(1)
Medal record
Bayern Munich
Winner	Bundesliga	1989
Runner-up	DFB-Supercup	1989
Winner	Bundesliga	1990
Winner	DFB-Supercup	1990
Winner	Bundesliga	1994
West Germany
Bronze medal – third place	Olympics	1988
- * Club domestic league appearances and goals

Roland Grahammer (born 3 November 1963) is a German former footballer.

== Honours ==
- Bundesliga: 1988–89, 1989–90
- DFL-Supercup: 1990
