= Rainer Aigner =

German footballer

Personal information
- Date of birth: 4 September 1967 (age 59)
- Place of birth: West Germany
- Height: 1.82 m (5 ft 11 1/2 in)
- Position: Defender

Youth career
- –1984: SSV Wurmannsquick
- 1984–1985: TSV 1860 München

Senior career*
Years	Team	Apps	(Gls)
1985–1989	TSV 1860 München	80	(4)
1989–1991	Bayern Munich (A)	50	(2)
1990–1991	Bayern Munich	1	(0)
1991–1994	Fortuna Düsseldorf	79	(4)
1994–1997	Bayern Munich (A)	81	(2)
1997–1998	SC Baldham-Vaterstetten		
Total		291	(12)
- * Club domestic league appearances and goals

Rainer Aigner (born 4 September 1967) is a German former footballer.
