= Raimond Aumann =

German footballer

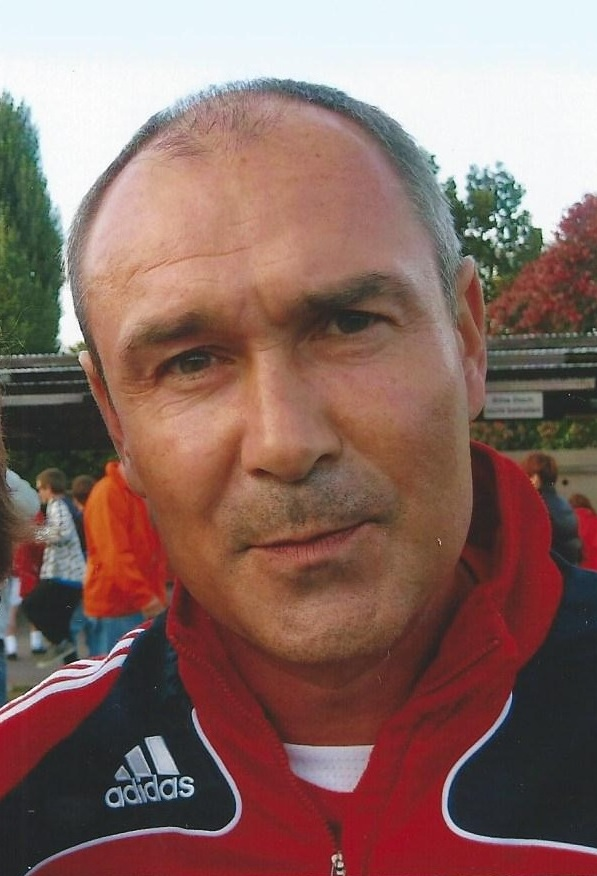
- Aumann with Bayern in 2009

Personal information
- Date of birth: 12 October 1963 (age 63)
- Place of birth: Augsburg, West Germany
- Height: 1.82 m (6 ft 0 in)
- Position: Goalkeeper

Youth career
- 1970–1976: SV Stadtwerke Augsburg
- 1976–1980: FC Augsburg
- 1980–1982: Bayern Munich

Senior career*
Years	Team	Apps	(Gls)
1982–1994	Bayern Munich	216	(0)
1994–1995	Beşiktaş	41	(0)
Total		257	(0)

International career
1984–1985	West Germany U-21	7	(0)
1989–1990	West Germany	4	(0)
- * Club domestic league appearances and goals

Raimond Aumann (born 12 October 1963) is a German former professional footballer who played as a goalkeeper.

== Career ==
Aumann was born in Augsburg, West Germany. He played in the Bundesliga between 1982 and 1994. The first two years he was only reserve keeper of Bayern Munich (first choice was Jean-Marie Pfaff). In 1984, he became number 1 for the first time until his injury in November 1985. When Pfaff left Bayern Munich in 1988, Aumann became number 1. He was considered one of the best German goalkeepers at that time.

With Bayern Munich he won six German championships and twice the German Cup before he transferred in 1994 to Beşiktaş, where he was to help them to a 1995 league victory. He retired from football in November 1995.

Aumann played four times internationally in 1989 and 1990. He was a member of Germany's squad for the 1990 World Cup, but did not play in the tournament.

He is the supporters and fan club coordinator for Bayern Munich.

== Honours ==
Bayern Munich

- DFB-Pokal: 1983–84, 1985–86
- Bundesliga (6): 1984–85, 1985–86, 1986–87, 1988–89, 1989–90, 1993–94
- European Cup: runner-up 1986–87
- DFL-Supercup: 1987, 1990

Beşiktaş

- Süper Lig: 1994–95

Germany

- World Cup: 1990
