= Ulf Kliche =

German footballer

Personal information
- Date of birth: 7 August 1969 (age 57)
- Place of birth: Flensburg, West Germany
- Height: 1.93 m (6 ft 4 in)
- Position: Defender

Youth career
- TSV Oversee
- –1987: VfB Kiel

Senior career*
Years	Team	Apps	(Gls)
1987–1992	Bayern Munich (A)		
1990–1991	Bayern Munich	0	(0)
1992–1993	VfB Oldenburg	17	(0)
1993–1994	TuS Hoisdorf	8	(0)
1994–1999	SV Wilhelmshaven		
1999–2003	Concordia Ihrhove	117	(0)
2003–2007	VfB Oldenburg		

International career
1990	Germany Olympic	3	(0)
- * Club domestic league appearances and goals

Ulf Kliche (born 7 August 1969) is a German former professional footballer who played as a defender.
