= Thomas Kastenmaier =

German footballer (born 1966)

Personal information
- Date of birth: 31 May 1966 (age 60)
- Place of birth: Munich, West Germany
- Height: 1.88 m (6 ft 2 in)
- Position: Defender

Youth career
- Harteck München
- TSV Milbertshofen

Senior career*
| Years | Team | Apps | (Gls) |
| 1987–1989 | Bayern Munich (A) | | |
| 1989–1990 | Bayern Munich | 9 | (1) |
| 1990–1998 | Borussia Mönchengladbach | 182 | (40) |

Managerial career
- 2004: Borussia Mönchengladbach II
- 2004: Borussia Mönchengladbach II(assistant)
- 2005: Rot Weiss Ahlen (assistant)
- 2005: Rot Weiss Ahlen (caretaker)
- 2005: Rot Weiss Ahlen (assistant)
- 2007–2008: SC Wegberg
- 2009–2010: SC Erkelenz
- * Club domestic league appearances and goals

Thomas Kastenmaier (born 31 May 1966) is a German football coach and former player. Mainly a right back who could also appear as a midfielder, he possessed a thunderous right-foot shot, often scoring from free kicks, and played most of his career for Borussia Mönchengladbach.

== Career ==
Born in Munich, Kastenmaier started his professional career with local Bayern Munich. He scored in his Bundesliga debut, a 4–0 home win over Hamburger SV, on 31 August 1989.

Deemed surplus to requirements after having appeared in only nine games for the 1990 champions, Kastenmaier joined Borussia Mönchengladbach, scoring nine goals in two separate seasons, while also helping the club to the 1995 German Cup.

He retired in 1998 after two injury-ravaged seasons, subsequently beginning his managerial career, starting with Borussia's amateurs.

== Honours ==
Bayern Munich

- Bundesliga: 1989–90

Borussia Mönchengladbach

- DFB-Pokal: 1994–95
