= Alan McInally =

Scottish footballer (born 1963)

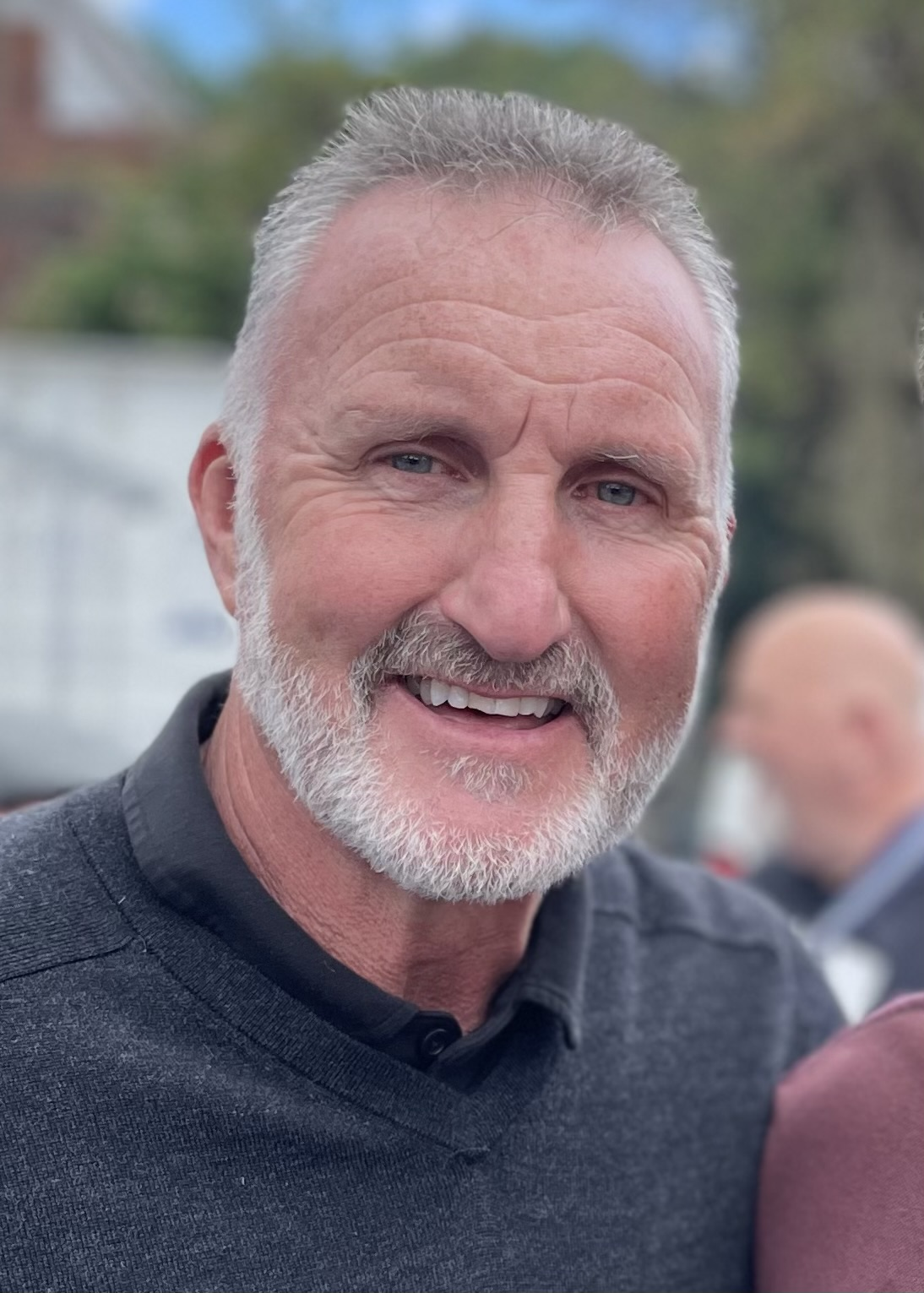

Personal information
- Full name: Alan Bruce McInally
- Date of birth: 10 February 1963 (age 63)
- Place of birth: Ayr, Scotland
- Position: Striker

Senior career*
Years	Team	Apps	(Gls)
1980–1984	Ayr United	93	(32)
1984–1987	Celtic	65	(17)
1987–1989	Aston Villa	59	(18)
1989–1993	Bayern Munich	40	(10)
1993–1994	Kilmarnock	8	(0)
Total		265	(77)

International career
1989–1990	Scotland	8	(3)
- * Club domestic league appearances and goals

Alan Bruce McInally (born 10 February 1963) is a Scottish former professional footballer, sports reporter and pundit.

As a player he was a striker for Ayr United, Celtic, Aston Villa, Bayern Munich and Kilmarnock. He is now a regular reporter and occasional pundit on Sky Sports Soccer Saturday.

== Club career ==
Ayr-born McInally variously went by the nicknames of Rambo and Big Mac and he is the son of Jackie McInally, who played in Kilmarnock's title-winning side of 1965, scoring 11 goals. He won his first medal in the 1985–86 season, when Celtic won the title on goal difference from Hearts, although he played only 16 games (with one goal scored). In his third and last season at the club (1986–87), he scored 15 goals in his 38 league games.

He then moved to English club Aston Villa, helping them win promotion in 1988. He was transferred in 1989 to German giants Bayern Munich, where he stayed for four years. In his first season at Bayern he made 31 appearances and scored 10 goals as he helped them win the 1989–90 Bundesliga.

== International career ==
During this period he appeared in eight international games for Scotland and was selected for their 1990 FIFA World Cup squad.

== Honours ==
Celtic

- Scottish League Championship: 1985–86

Aston Villa

- Football League Second Division runner-up: 1987–88

Bayern Munich

- Bundesliga: 1989–90

== Media career ==
After playing for Kilmarnock during the 1993–94 season, McInally retired from playing football. He has since worked in the media, most notably for the Sky Sports show Soccer Saturday. He also commentated on the FIFA 19 video game.
