= Radmilo Mihajlović =

Bosnian footballer (born 1964)

Personal information
- Date of birth: 19 November 1964 (age 61)
- Place of birth: Foča, SFR Yugoslavia
- Height: 1.81 m (5 ft 11 in)
- Position: Forward

Youth career
- –1983: Sutjeska Foča

Senior career*
Years	Team	Apps	(Gls)
1983–1988	Željezničar	119	(67)
1988–1989	Dinamo Zagreb	26	(9)
1989–1990	Bayern Munich	34	(4)
1991–1993	Schalke 04	58	(12)
1993–1994	Eintracht Frankfurt	10	(0)
1997	Pohang Steelers	3	(0)
1997–1998	APOP Paphos	14	(5)
Total		264	(97)

International career
1986–1989	Yugoslavia	6	(1)
- * Club domestic league appearances and goals

Radmilo Mihajlović (Serbian Cyrillic: Радмило Михајловић; born 19 November 1964) is a Bosnian former footballer who played as a forward.

== Club career ==
=== Early career ===
Mihajlović started playing football in hometown club Sutjeska Foča and was spotted there as a talented forward.

=== Željezničar ===
In the 1983–84 season, Mihajlović left for Željezničar. He played more than 100 league games and scored more than 50 league goals before he left the club in 1988. He was the top goalscorer in the 1986–87 season with 23 goals.

With Željezničar, Mihajlović reached the semi-finals of the 1984–85 UEFA Cup. He left the club in 1988.

=== Dinamo Zagreb ===
After leaving Željezničar, Mihajlović tried to engineer a move to Red Star Belgrade, the team that he and his family supported since childhood, though he ended up at Dinamo Zagreb where he arrived on initiative by manager Miroslav Blažević.

Mihajlović played for one season with the Zagreb-based club and was promoted to club captain by next manager Josip Skoblar, becoming the first Serb, although a Bosnian Serb, to become captain of Dinamo Zagreb.

=== Bayern Munich ===
In 1989, Mihajlović moved to West Germany to play for Bayern Munich. He scored four goals in 34 league matches for the club. While at Bayern, he won the 1989–90 Bundesliga and the 1990 DFB-Supercup.

=== Schalke 04 ===
During the 1990–91 winter transfer window, Mihajlović moved to Schalke 04 of the 2. Bundesliga where he collected 58 league appearances and scored twelve goals. With Schalke, he won the 2. Bundesliga in the 1990–91 season.

=== Later career and retirement ===
In his later career, Mihajlović played for Eintracht Frankfurt before taking a three year break from active football.

After getting back to playing in 1997, he played for South Korean club Pohang Steelers with whom he won the 1996–97 AFC Champions League. Mihajlović finished his career in 1998, at Cypriot side APOP Paphos.

== International career ==
Mihajlović made his debut for Yugoslavia in an October 1986 European Championship qualification match against Turkey and has earned a total of 6 caps, scoring 1 goal. His final international was a December 1989 friendly match away against England.

== Post-playing career ==
After retiring from playing, Mihajlović worked as a player agent. He then spent some time as FK Rad's sporting director.

== Personal life ==
Mihajlović's son, Stefan Mihajlović, is also a professional footballer.

== Honours ==
=== Player ===
Bayern Munich

- Bundesliga: 1989–90
- DFB-Supercup: 1990

Schalke 04

- 2. Bundesliga: 1990–91

Pohang Steelers

- AFC Champions League: 1996–97

Individual

- Yugoslav First League top scorer: 1986–87 (23 goals)
