= Hans Pflügler =

German footballer

Personal information
- Full name: Johannes Christian Pflügler
- Date of birth: 27 March 1960 (age 66)
- Place of birth: Freising, West Germany
- Height: 1.82 m (6 ft 0 in)
- Position: Defender

Youth career
- 1967–1975: SV Vötting-Weihenstephan
- 1975–1979: Bayern Munich

Senior career*
Years	Team	Apps	(Gls)
1979–1982	Bayern Munich II		
1981–1992	Bayern Munich	276	(36)
1992–1997	Bayern Munich II	66	(6)
1995	Bayern Munich	1	(0)
1997–2001	Eintracht Freising		
2001–2002	Bayern Munich II	32	(4)
2002–2005	Eintracht Freising		
Total		375	(46)

International career
1987–1990	West Germany	11	(0)
- * Club domestic league appearances and goals

Johannes Christian "Hans" Pflügler (born 27 March 1960) is a German former professional footballer. He could operate as either a left-back or a central defender, and played solely for Bayern Munich, winning ten major titles and appearing in nearly 400 official games.

Pflügler represented West Germany at the 1990 World Cup and won the tournament. He also appeared at the Euro 1988.

== Club career ==
Born in Freising, Pflügler made his professional debut in 1981–82 with the only club he ever knew, local FC Bayern Munich. In his first season he was an unused substitute in the European Cup Final.

After two experimental seasons he became first-choice, scoring a total of 27 Bundesliga goals from 1983 to 1988 and playing all the matches and minutes in the 1986–87 European Cup, as the team finally finished second to FC Porto.

After helping the Bavarians to five leagues and three cups, Pflügler only managed to make 14 appearances in the 1991–92 campaign, and decided to retire. However, a flood of injuries to the side in 1995 prompted a request by manager Giovanni Trapattoni which the player accepted, appearing on 8 April in a home game against 1. FC Kaiserslautern where he was also booked; even more astonishingly, he spent the entire 2001–02 with the B team in Regionalliga Süd, helping them to a final tenth place at the age of 42.

== International career ==
Pflügler earned 11 caps for the Germany national team, making his debut on 25 March 1987 in a friendly with Israel. He was selected for the squad at the following year's UEFA European Championship.

Pflügler was also picked for the 1990 FIFA World Cup as Andreas Brehme's backup, playing 90 minutes of the 1–1 group-stage draw against Colombia for the eventual champions.

== Personal life ==
Pflügler is an engineer with a diploma. He was also connected with Bayern's merchandising departments, where he already worked before being summoned out of retirement for the first time.

Pflügler also operated Pension Pflügler, in his hometown.

== Honours ==
Bayern Munich

- Bundesliga: 1984–85, 1985–86, 1986–87, 1988–89, 1989–90
- DFB-Pokal: 1981–82, 1983–84, 1985–86; runner-up 1984–85
- European Cup runner-up: 1986–87
- DFL-Supercup: 1987, 1990

Germany

- FIFA World Cup: 1990

== See also ==
- List of one-club men
