= Roland Wohlfarth =

German footballer (born 1963)

Personal information
- Date of birth: 11 January 1963 (age 63)
- Place of birth: Bocholt, West Germany
- Position: Forward

Youth career
- BV Borussia Bocholt

Senior career*
Years	Team	Apps	(Gls)
1981–1984	MSV Duisburg	71	(39)
1984–1993	Bayern Munich	254	(119)
1993–1994	Saint-Étienne	39	(20)
1994–1997	VfL Bochum	40	(7)
1997–1998	VfB Leipzig	15	(4)
1998–1999	Wuppertaler SV	14	(4)
1999–2000	1. FC Bocholt	4	(0)
Total		437	(193)

International career
1981	West Germany U-18	5	(1)
1981	West Germany U-20	6	(4)
1982–1983	West Germany U-21	6	(1)
1986–1989	West Germany	2	(0)
- * Club domestic league appearances and goals

Roland Wohlfarth (born 11 January 1963) is a former professional footballer who played as a forward.

== Club career ==
Wohlfarth was born in Bocholt. He was active in the Bundesliga from 1981 until 1998, spanning 287 games and 120 goals. At first Wohlfarth played for Borussia Bocholt in his youth, then for Duisburg, Bayern Munich, Leipzig and Bochum. His career ended in the year 2000 at Wuppertal. With Bayern Munich he won the Bundesliga in 1985, 1986, 1987, 1989 and 1990, the DFB Cup in 1986 and the DFL-Supercup in 1987 and 1990.

In the final of the DFB-Pokal on 3 May 1986, Wohlfarth scored a hat-trick in a 5–2 victory against VfB Stuttgart.

At Bayern Munich he had to fight for his place in the first-team squad every season, against top class newcomers of the club. He usually found success in doing this, becoming top scorer of the Bundesliga on two occasions, in 1989 with 17 goals and 1991 with 21.

== International career ==
Despite his club success with Bayern Munich, Wohlfarth only earned two caps for West Germany in 1986 and 1989 respectively. He failed to score in either appearance.

== Controversy ==
In the first doping judgement of the Bundesliga from 16 February 1995, Wohlfarth was convicted of the intake of forbidden substances (anorectics), and received a two-month ban.

== Career statistics ==
=== International ===
Appearances and goals by national team and year
National team	Year	Apps	Goals
West Germany	1986	1	0
West Germany	1987	0	0
West Germany	1988	0	0
West Germany	1989	1	0
Total		2	0

== Honours ==
Bayern Munich

- Bundesliga: 1984–85, 1985–86, 1986–87, 1988–89, 1989–90
- DFB-Pokal: 1985–86
- DFB/DFL-Supercup: 1987, 1990

Individual

- 2. Bundesliga top scorer: 1983–84
- Bundesliga top scorer: 1988–89, 1990–91
