= Jürgen Kohler =

German footballer and manager

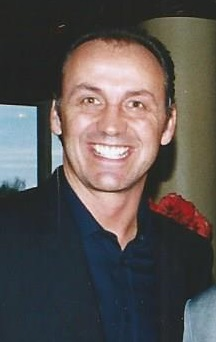
- Kohler in 2005

Personal information
- Date of birth: 6 October 1965 (age 61)
- Place of birth: Lambsheim, West Germany
- Height: 1.86 m (6 ft 1 in)
- Position: Centre-back

Team information
- Current team: Bonner SC (U17 manager)

Youth career
- 1975–1981: TB Jahn Lambsheim
- 1982–1983: Waldhof Mannheim

Senior career*
Years	Team	Apps	(Gls)
1983–1987	Waldhof Mannheim	95	(6)
1987–1989	1. FC Köln	57	(2)
1989–1991	Bayern Munich	55	(6)
1991–1995	Juventus	102	(8)
1995–2002	Borussia Dortmund	191	(14)
Total		500	(36)

International career
1983–1984	West Germany U18	8	(1)
1985–1987	West Germany U21	11	(0)
1986–1998	Germany	105	(2)

Managerial career
- 2002–2003: Germany U21
- 2005–2006: MSV Duisburg
- 2008: VfR Aalen
- 2012: Bonner SC (U19 manager)
- 2013–2015: SpVgg EGC Wirges
- 2015–2016: SC Hauenstein
- 2016–2017: VfL Alfter
- 2018–2020: Viktoria Köln (U19 manager)
- 2019: Viktoria Köln (caretaker)
- 2024–: Bonner SC (U17 manager)
Medal record
Men's football
Representing Germany
FIFA World Cup
Winner	1990 Italy
UEFA European Championship
Winner	1996 England
Runner-up	1992 Sweden
- * Club domestic league appearances and goals

Jürgen Kohler (born 6 October 1965) is a German former professional footballer and manager, who played as a centre-back. He is currently the U17 manager of Bonner SC. During his playing career, he won the World Cup with the German national team in 1990 and the European Championship in 1996. At club level, he won the UEFA Champions League, the UEFA Cup, three German championships, and one Italian championship as a player of Bayern Munich, Juventus and Borussia Dortmund.

== Playing career ==
=== Club ===
Kohler enjoyed a lengthy career at the highest level with exactly 500 top flight league matches, playing primarily as a centre back in the German Bundesliga, and in the Italian Serie A, achieving notable success both at domestic and international level with FC Bayern Munich, Borussia Dortmund and Juventus.

Kohler's professional career began at Waldhof Mannheim, where he made his Bundesliga debut as a substitute against 1. FC Kaiserslautern in April 1984. His first professional goal came in a 5–2 defeat of FC Schalke 04 on 26 January 1985.

A two-year spell at 1. FC Köln preceded a transfer to Bayern Munich, with the Bavarian club winning the Bundesliga championship in his first season at the club.

In 1991, Kohler transferred to Italian club Juventus. After being named Serie A's best foreign player for 1992, he went on to be part of the team that won the 1992–93 UEFA Cup against Borussia Dortmund, as well as a league and cup double in the 1994–95 season.

Returning to Germany to play for Dortmund in 1995, Kohler won another league championship in 1996 and helped the club to the 1997 UEFA Champions League Final. In a reversal of Kohler's previous continental final victory, Dortmund defeated his former club Juventus to become European Champions for the first time. As a result of this success, Kohler was named Footballer of the Year (Germany) for 1997. In the 2001–02 season, the last of his career, Kohler won his third Bundesliga title with Dortmund and reached the final of the UEFA Cup.

In his final professional appearance, the 2002 UEFA Cup Final against Feyenoord, Kohler was sent off for a foul on Jon Dahl Tomasson in the 31st minute of the match. After losing possession to Tomasson on the edge of Dortmund's penalty area, Kohler tripped the Danish forward inside the area to concede a penalty kick and was given a straight red card by referee Vítor Melo Pereira. Pierre van Hooijdonk scored the opening goal from the resulting penalty and BVB went on to lose the match 3–2.

=== International ===
At international level, Kohler made over 100 appearances for the Germany national team, playing at three FIFA World Cups and three UEFA European Championships, winning the 1990 FIFA World Cup and UEFA Euro 1996.

== Style of play ==
Regarded by pundits as one of the best defenders of his generation (even being dubbed the best stopper in the world by Maurizio Crosetti e Licia Granello of La Repubblica in 1992), Kohler was a complete and physically strong centre-back, who was famed for his defensive perception, anticipation, quick reactions, and marking, as well as his tactical sense; he was also known for his prowess in the air, courtesy of his height, timing, heading accuracy, and elevation, which also made him a goal threat during set-pieces. Although primarily a powerful and hard-tackling but fair stopper (man-marking centre-back), he was also known for his composure and finesse when in possession, and his ability to play the ball out of defence, which he was able to improve as his career progressed, in particular during his time in Italy, where he showed significant technical developments, after initially being pejoratively nicknamed "Eisenfuss" ("iron foot," in German) in his home-country. Beyond his defensive capabilities, he also stood out for his mentality, professionalism, and leadership qualities. Despite his ability as a defender, however, he also struggled with injuries throughout his career; his physical struggles occasionally limited his playing time and affected his form and consistency. Moreover, he was predominantly a right-footed player, who was not particularly adept with his weaker left foot. He was also known for his professional rivalry with Dutch striker Marco van Basten.

== Coaching career ==
After his playing career was over, he has managed the German under-21 side, and became sports director of Bayer Leverkusen on 31 March 2003, quitting this post on 29 June 2004.

On 17 December 2005, he was appointed the coach of MSV Duisburg.

In August 2006, he turned down the opportunity to coach the Ivory Coast national team.

On 28 August 2008, Kohler signed a three-year contract as manager of German 3. Liga club VfR Aalen. However, on 16 November 2008, he retired due to a heart condition from the coaching job. He continued to work as director of sports for Aalen, but was sacked on 5 May 2009.

In April 2013, he started to work as director of sports for his former club SV Waldhof Mannheim.

== Personal life ==
After his retirement from professional sports, Kohler occasionally played for Alemannia Adendorf in the Kreisliga C (the 11th tier of German club football).

== Career statistics ==
=== Club ===
Appearances and goals by club, season and competition
Club	Season	League			Cup		League Cup		Continental		SuperCup^{1}		Total	
Club	Season	Division	Apps	Goals	Apps	Goals	Apps	Goals	Apps	Goals	Apps	Goals	Apps	Goals
Waldhof Mannheim	1983–84	Bundesliga	5	0	—		—		—		—		5	0
Waldhof Mannheim	1984–85	Bundesliga	26	2	1	0	—		—		—		27	2
Waldhof Mannheim	1985–86	Bundesliga	32	1	5	2	—		—		—		37	3
Waldhof Mannheim	1986–87	Bundesliga	32	3	2	0	—		—		—		34	3
Waldhof Mannheim	Total		95	6	8	2	—		—		—		103	8
1. FC Köln	1987–88	Bundesliga	30	2	2	0	—		—		—		32	2
1. FC Köln	1988–89	Bundesliga	27	0	2	0	—		6	0	—		35	0
1. FC Köln	Total		57	2	4	0	—		6	0	—		67	2
Bayern Munich	1989–90	Bundesliga	26	2	2	0	—		6	0	1	0	35	2
Bayern Munich	1990–91	Bundesliga	29	4	1	0	—		7	0	1	1	38	5
Bayern Munich	Total		55	6	3	0	—		13	0	2	1	73	7
Juventus	1991–92	Serie A	27	3	7	0	—		—		—		34	3
Juventus	1992–93	Serie A	29	1	7	1	—		11	2	—		47	4
Juventus	1993–94	Serie A	27	3	1	0	—		7	1	—		35	4
Juventus	1994–95	Serie A	19	1	5	0	—		5	1	—		29	2
Juventus	Total		102	8	20	1	—		23	4	—		145	13
Borussia Dortmund	1995–96	Bundesliga	29	5	3	0	—		7	0	1	0	40	5
Borussia Dortmund	1996–97	Bundesliga	30	2	1	0	—		8	1	1	0	40	3
Borussia Dortmund	1997–98	Bundesliga	23	3	3	1	2	0	5	0	1	0	34	4
Borussia Dortmund	1998–99	Bundesliga	29	2	3	0	—		—		—		32	2
Borussia Dortmund	1999–00	Bundesliga	30	2	—		1	0	10	1	—		41	3
Borussia Dortmund	2000–01	Bundesliga	28	0	2	0	—		—		—		30	0
Borussia Dortmund	2001–02	Bundesliga	22	0	—		1	1	10	0	—		33	1
Borussia Dortmund	Total		191	14	12	1	4	1	40	2	3	0	250	18
Career total			500	36	44	4	4	1	82	6	5	1	635	48

- ^{1} Including appearances in 1989 DFB-Supercup, 1990 DFB-Supercup, 1995 DFB-Supercup, 1996 DFB-Supercup and 1997 UEFA Super Cup .

=== International ===
Appearances and goals by national team and year
National team	Year	Apps	Goals
Germany	1986	2	0
Germany	1987	9	0
Germany	1988	11	0
Germany	1989	2	0
Germany	1990	10	0
Germany	1991	6	0
Germany	1992	10	0
Germany	1993	10	0
Germany	1994	13	0
Germany	1995	5	0
Germany	1996	10	1
Germany	1997	7	0
Germany	1998	10	1
Total		105	2

Scores and results list Germany's goal tally first, score column indicates score after each Kohler goal.

List of international goals scored by Jürgen Kohler
No.	Date	Venue	Opponent	Score	Result	Competition
1	4 June 1996	Carl-Benz-Stadion, Mannheim	Liechtenstein	6–0	9–1	Friendly
2	18 February 1998	Sultan Qaboos Sports Complex, Muscat	Oman	2–0	2–0	Friendly

== Honours ==
Bayern Munich

- Bundesliga: 1989–90
- DFB-Supercup: 1990

Juventus

- Serie A: 1994–95
- Coppa Italia: 1994–95
- UEFA Cup: 1992–93

Borussia Dortmund

- Bundesliga: 1995–96, 2001–02
- DFB-Supercup: 1995, 1996
- UEFA Champions League: 1996–97
- Intercontinental Cup: 1997
- UEFA Cup runner-up: 2001–02

Germany

- FIFA World Cup: 1990
- UEFA European Championship: 1996, runner-up 1992
- U.S. Cup: 1993

Individual

- kicker Bundesliga Team of the Season: 1986–87, 1987–88, 1988–89, 1990–91, 1998–99, 2000–01
- UEFA European Championship Team of the Tournament: 1992
- Footballer of the Year in Germany: 1997

== See also ==
- List of men's footballers with 100 or more international caps
