= 1989–90 Bundesliga =

27th season of the Bundesliga

Bundesliga
- Season: 1989–90
- Dates: 28 July 1989 – 12 May 1990
- Champions: Bayern Munich; 11th Bundesliga title 12th German title
- Relegated: SV Waldhof Mannheim; FC Homburg
- European Cup: FC Bayern Munich
- Cup Winners' Cup: 1. FC Kaiserslautern
- UEFA Cup: 1. FC Köln; Eintracht Frankfurt; Borussia Dortmund; Bayer 04 Leverkusen
- Goals: 773
- Average goals/game: 2.53
- Top goalscorer: Jørn Andersen (18)
- Biggest home win: Düsseldorf 7–0 St. Pauli (12 May 1990)
- Biggest away win: Köln 0–5 Karlsruhe (21 April 1990)
- Highest scoring: Köln 3–5 Frankfurt (8 goals) (18 November 1989)

The 1989–90 Bundesliga was the 27th season of the Bundesliga, the premier football league in West Germany. It began on 28 July 1989 and ended on 12 May 1990. FC Bayern Munich were the defending champions.

== Competition modus ==
Every team played two games against each other team, one at home and one away. Teams received two points for a win and one point for a draw. If two or more teams were tied on points, places were determined by goal difference and, if still tied, by goals scored. The team with the most points were crowned champions while the two teams with the fewest points were relegated to 2. Bundesliga. The third-to-last team had to compete in a two-legged relegation/promotion play-off against the third-placed team from 2. Bundesliga.

== Team changes to 1988–89 ==
Stuttgarter Kickers and Hannover 96 were directly relegated to the 2. Bundesliga after finishing in the last two places. They were replaced by Fortuna Düsseldorf and FC Homburg. Relegation/promotion play-off participant Eintracht Frankfurt won on aggregate against 1. FC Saarbrücken and thus retained their Bundesliga status.

== Team overview ==
Location of teams in Bundesliga 1989–90

Club	Location	Ground	Capacity
VfL Bochum	Bochum	Ruhrstadion	40,000
SV Werder Bremen	Bremen	Weserstadion	32,000
Borussia Dortmund	Dortmund	Westfalenstadion	54,000
Fortuna Düsseldorf	Düsseldorf	Rheinstadion	59,600
Eintracht Frankfurt	Frankfurt	Waldstadion	62,000
Hamburger SV	Hamburg	Volksparkstadion	62,000
FC Homburg	Homburg	Waldstadion	24,000
1. FC Kaiserslautern	Kaiserslautern	Fritz-Walter-Stadion	42,000
Karlsruher SC	Karlsruhe	Wildparkstadion	50,000
1. FC Köln	Cologne	Müngersdorfer Stadion	61,000
Bayer 04 Leverkusen	Leverkusen	Ulrich-Haberland-Stadion	20,000
SV Waldhof Mannheim	Mannheim	Stadion am Alsenweg	15,200
Borussia Mönchengladbach	Mönchengladbach	Bökelbergstadion	34,500
FC Bayern Munich	Munich	Olympiastadion	70,000
1. FC Nürnberg	Nuremberg	Städtisches Stadion	64,238
FC St. Pauli	Hamburg	Stadion am Millerntor	18,000
VfB Stuttgart	Stuttgart	Neckarstadion	72,000
Bayer 05 Uerdingen	Krefeld	Grotenburg-Stadion	34,500

== League table ==
Pos	Team	Pld	W	D	L	GF	GA	GD	Pts	Qualification or relegation
1	Bayern Munich (C)	34	19	11	4	64	28	+36	49	Qualification to European Cup first round
2	1. FC Köln	34	17	9	8	54	44	+10	43	Qualification to UEFA Cup first round
3	Eintracht Frankfurt	34	15	11	8	61	40	+21	41	Qualification to UEFA Cup first round
4	Borussia Dortmund	34	15	11	8	51	35	+16	41	Qualification to UEFA Cup first round
5	Bayer Leverkusen	34	12	15	7	40	32	+8	39	Qualification to UEFA Cup first round
6	VfB Stuttgart	34	15	6	13	53	47	+6	36	
7	Werder Bremen	34	10	14	10	49	41	+8	34	
8	1. FC Nürnberg	34	11	11	12	42	46	−4	33	
9	Fortuna Düsseldorf	34	10	12	12	41	41	0	32	
10	Karlsruher SC	34	10	12	12	32	39	−7	32	
11	Hamburger SV	34	13	5	16	39	46	−7	31	
12	1. FC Kaiserslautern	34	10	11	13	42	55	−13	31	Qualification to Cup Winners' Cup first round
13	FC St. Pauli	34	9	13	12	31	46	−15	31	
14	Bayer 05 Uerdingen	34	10	10	14	41	48	−7	30	
15	Borussia Mönchengladbach	34	11	8	15	37	45	−8	30	
16	VfL Bochum (O)	34	11	7	16	44	53	−9	29	Qualification to relegation play-offs
17	Waldhof Mannheim (R)	34	10	6	18	36	53	−17	26	Relegation to 2. Bundesliga
18	FC 08 Homburg (R)	34	8	8	18	33	51	−18	24	Relegation to 2. Bundesliga

Source: www.dfb.de
Rules for classification: 1) points; 2) goal difference; 3) number of goals scored.
(C) Champions; (O) Play-off winners; (R) Relegated

== Results ==
Home \ Away	BOC	SVW	BVB	F95	SGE	HSV	HOM	FCK	KSC	KOE	B04	WMA	BMG	FCB	FCN	STP	VFB	B05
VfL Bochum	—	0–0	2–3	1–2	2–2	3–1	1–0	2–0	2–0	0–1	0–2	2–0	2–1	0–0	3–3	3–3	2–0	2–1
Werder Bremen	1–1	—	2–0	2–2	1–2	2–1	0–0	4–0	4–0	4–0	0–0	0–1	0–0	2–2	4–0	2–1	6–1	0–0
Borussia Dortmund	0–1	4–1	—	1–0	0–0	1–0	3–0	1–1	2–0	0–0	1–1	2–0	3–0	2–2	2–1	3–1	2–0	1–0
Fortuna Düsseldorf	2–2	2–1	1–1	—	1–2	1–1	1–0	1–1	0–0	1–1	2–0	0–0	0–1	1–2	0–0	7–0	4–2	2–1
Eintracht Frankfurt	4–0	1–0	0–2	2–0	—	2–0	1–1	1–1	1–1	3–1	0–3	3–1	3–0	1–2	5–1	4–1	5–1	2–1
Hamburger SV	1–4	4–0	1–1	1–0	1–1	—	2–0	3–0	1–0	0–2	0–1	1–0	3–0	0–3	1–0	0–0	1–0	6–0
FC Homburg	1–0	1–1	3–3	1–0	2–3	0–1	—	2–2	2–0	0–1	2–1	2–1	1–3	1–3	0–1	0–2	4–2	1–2
1. FC Kaiserslautern	2–1	2–2	2–2	1–0	2–1	1–3	3–1	—	5–1	1–2	2–0	2–3	2–1	0–0	0–2	1–1	1–2	2–1
Karlsruher SC	2–0	2–1	2–1	2–2	1–0	2–0	0–2	0–0	—	0–0	2–1	4–0	0–1	3–3	0–0	0–0	1–0	0–0
1. FC Köln	2–0	4–2	1–1	1–3	3–5	2–0	1–0	4–1	0–5	—	1–1	6–0	3–0	1–1	2–1	1–0	0–0	0–1
Bayer Leverkusen	2–1	1–3	1–0	3–3	2–0	1–0	3–1	1–1	1–1	0–2	—	3–0	0–0	0–0	2–0	1–1	1–1	1–1
Waldhof Mannheim	3–2	0–0	2–1	0–1	1–1	4–1	1–2	4–0	0–1	2–3	1–1	—	4–2	1–0	1–1	0–1	2–1	1–1
Borussia Mönchengladbach	1–2	4–0	0–0	3–1	2–1	1–3	0–0	3–1	0–0	0–2	1–1	2–0	—	0–0	3–0	4–1	3–1	0–1
Bayern Munich	5–1	1–1	3–0	0–0	1–0	4–0	1–0	3–0	4–1	5–1	0–1	2–0	2–0	—	3–2	1–0	3–1	3–0
1. FC Nürnberg	2–1	1–1	1–3	3–0	1–1	2–0	2–0	0–0	2–0	1–1	2–2	2–0	2–0	4–0	—	0–1	0–2	1–1
FC St. Pauli	2–0	0–0	2–1	1–0	2–2	0–0	1–1	0–2	1–1	1–1	3–0	2–1	2–1	0–2	0–1	—	0–0	1–1
VfB Stuttgart	1–0	3–1	3–1	4–0	1–1	3–0	2–2	0–1	2–0	3–1	0–0	1–0	4–0	2–1	4–0	4–0	—	1–0
Bayer Uerdingen	3–1	0–1	1–3	0–1	1–1	5–2	3–0	3–2	1–0	2–3	0–2	0–2	0–0	2–2	3–3	1–0	4–1	—

Source: DFB
Legend: Blue = home team win; Yellow = draw; Red = away team win.

== Relegation play-offs ==
VfL Bochum and third-placed 2. Bundesliga team 1. FC Saarbrücken had to compete in a two-legged relegation/promotion play-off. Bochum won 2–1 on aggregate and retained their Bundesliga status.

24 May 1990

1. FC Saarbrücken	0–1	VfL Bochum
		Legat 65' (pen.)

Ludwigspark, Saarbrücken
Attendance: 30,000
Referee: Manfred Neuner (Leimen)

27 May 1990

VfL Bochum	1–1	1. FC Saarbrücken
Leifeld 76'		Yeboah 49'

Ruhrstadion, Bochum
Attendance: 25,000
Referee: Aron Schmidhuber (Ottobrunn)

== Top goalscorers ==
18 goals

- (Norway) Jørn Andersen (Eintracht Frankfurt)

15 goals

- (Germany) Stefan Kuntz (1. FC Kaiserslautern)

13 goals

- (Germany) Fritz Walter (VfB Stuttgart)
- (Germany) Roland Wohlfarth (FC Bayern Munich)

11 goals

- (East Germany) Falko Götz (1. FC Köln)

10 goals

- (Germany) Hans-Jörg Criens (Borussia Mönchengladbach)
- (Germany) Uwe Freiler (SV Waldhof Mannheim)
- (Poland) Jan Furtok (Hamburger SV)
- (Germany) André Golke (FC St. Pauli)
- (Germany) Uwe Leifeld (VfL Bochum)
- (Scotland) Alan McInally (FC Bayern Munich)
- (Germany) Andreas Möller (Borussia Dortmund)
- (New Zealand) Wynton Rufer (SV Werder Bremen)
- (Germany) Michael Zorc (Borussia Dortmund)

== Champion squad ==
FC Bayern Munich
Goalkeepers: Raimond Aumann (33); Sven Scheuer (1).

Defenders: Hans Pflügler (33 / 3); Roland Grahammer (28 / 1); Jürgen Kohler (26 / 2); Klaus Augenthaler (captain; 24 / 1); Thomas Kastenmaier (9 / 1); Erland Johnsen (Norway) (8).
Midfielders: Stefan Reuter (33); Hans Dorfner (29 / 5); Ludwig Kögl (25 / 4); Manfred Schwabl (25 / 3); Hansi Flick (22 / 1); Olaf Thon (20 / 8); Thomas Strunz (20 / 5).
Forwards: Alan McInally (Scotland) (31 / 10); Radmilo Mihajlović (Socialist Federal Republic of Yugoslavia) (25 / 4); Roland Wohlfarth (24 / 13); Manfred Bender (20 / 2).
(league appearances and goals listed in brackets)

Manager: Jupp Heynckes.

On the roster but have not played in a league game: Helmut Winklhofer.

== Attendances ==
No.	Team	Attendance	Change	Highest
1	Borussia Dortmund	37,173	21.6%	54,000
2	Bayern München	36,235	19.1%	70,000
3	Eintracht Frankfurt	26,735	54.3%	55,000
4	1. FC Kaiserslautern	25,428	15.7%	35,335
5	1. FC Nürnberg	25,071	32.4%	46,500
6	VfB Stuttgart	24,876	-7.4%	68,000
7	1. FC Köln	22,294	6.5%	55,000
8	Hamburger SV	21,341	21.2%	54,500
9	Fortuna 95	19,941	128.5%	55,000
10	Borussia Mönchengladbach	19,660	47.9%	34,000
11	Karlsruher SC	19,265	-6.3%	37,000
12	Werder Bremen	19,263	-6.4%	30,100
13	FC St. Pauli	19,024	-9.8%	39,100
14	VfL Bochum	18,365	22.0%	40,000
15	Bayer Leverkusen	14,424	17.7%	27,000
16	Bayer 05 Uerdingen	12,241	7.2%	27,000
17	Waldhof Mannheim	12,196	-6.2%	15,300
18	FC 08 Homburg	8,695	84.0%	17,500
