= 1991–92 1. FC Köln season =

1. FC Köln
1991–92 season
- Manager: Jörg Berger
- Stadium: Müngersdorfer Stadion
- Bundesliga: 4th
- DFB-Pokal: Third round
- Top goalscorer: League: Frank Ordenewitz (11); All: Frank Ordenewitz; Maurice Banach; Henri Fuchs (11)

The 1993–94 1. FC Köln season was the 43rd season in the club's history and the 29th consecutive season playing in the Bundesliga. Köln finished fourth in the league.

The club also participated in the DFB-Pokal where it reached the third round, losing 0–2 to Bayer Leverkusen.

== Competitions ==
=== Overview ===
Competition	First match	Last match	Starting round	Final position	Record							
Competition	First match	Last match	Starting round	Final position	Pld	W	D	L	GF	GA	GD	Win %
Bundesliga	2 August 1991	16 May 1992	Matchday 1	4th	38	13	18	7	58	41	+17	34.21
DFB-Pokal	17 August 1991	3 September 1991	Second round	Third round	2	1	0	1	4	2	+2	50.00
Total					40	14	18	8	62	43	+19	35.00

Source: Competitions

=== Bundesliga ===
2 August 1991 1	VfL Bochum	2–2	1. FC Köln	Bochum
20:00	Epp 31'; Bonan 74'	Report	Ordenewitz 18'; Banach 45'	Stadium: Ruhrstadion; Attendance: 30,400; Referee: Bernd Heynemann

10 August 1991 2	1. FC Köln	0–0	Stuttgarter Kickers	Cologne
15:30		Report		Stadium: Müngersdorfer Stadion; Attendance: 16,000; Referee: Klaus-Dieter Stenzel

14 August 1991 3	1. FC Köln	1–1	1. FC Kaiserslautern	Cologne
20:00	Banach 86'	Report	Hotić 56'	Stadium: Müngersdorfer Stadion; Attendance: 28,000; Referee: Hermann Albrecht

21 August 1991 4	Hamburger SV	1–1	1. FC Köln	Hamburg
20:00	von Heesen 11'	Report	Ordenewitz 51'	Stadium: Volksparkstadion; Attendance: 26,800; Referee: Hans Fux

24 August 1991 5	1. FC Köln	1–1	Eintracht Frankfurt	Cologne
15:30	Ordenewitz 63' (pen.)	Report	Kruse 36'	Stadium: Müngersdorfer Stadion; Attendance: 21,000; Referee: Alfons Berg

28 August 1991 6	1. FC Nürnberg	4–0	1. FC Köln	Nürnberg
20:00	Wagner 1'; Friedmann 28'; Zárate 29'; Eckstein 37'	Report		Stadium: Städtisches Stadion; Attendance: 40,000; Referee: Wolfgang Mierswa

31 August 1991 7	1. FC Köln	1–1	Bayern Munich	Cologne
15:30	Banach 64'	Report	Effenberg 14'	Stadium: Müngersdorfer Stadion; Attendance: 43,000; Referee: Hans-Peter Dellwing

6 September 1991 8	Borussia Dortmund	3–1	1. FC Köln	Dortmund
20:00	Mill 37'; Rummenigge 69'; Povlsen 76'	Report	Banach 14'	Stadium: Westfalenstadion; Attendance: 42,611; Referee: Günther Habermann

14 September 1991 9	1. FC Köln	1–1	VfB Stuttgart	Cologne
15:30	Banach 39'	Report	Walter 24'	Stadium: Müngersdorfer Stadion; Attendance: 19,000; Referee: Werner Föckler

20 September 1991 10	Borussia Mönchengladbach	2–2	1. FC Köln	Mönchengladbach
20:00	Kastenmaier 28'; Fach 46'	Report	Banach 17'; Steinmann 57'	Stadium: Bökelbergstadion; Attendance: 23,114; Referee: Wieland Ziller

27 September 1991 11	1. FC Köln	1–1	SG Wattenscheid 09	Cologne
20:00	Moser 88' (o.g.)	Report	Fink 82'	Stadium: Müngersdorfer Stadion; Attendance: 23,000; Referee: Hans-Jürgen Kasper

5 October 1991 12	Bayer Leverkusen	1–1	1. FC Köln	Leverkusen
15:30	Kree 76'	Report	H. Fuchs 90'	Stadium: Ulrich-Haberland-Stadion; Attendance: 21,000; Referee: Manfred Harder

12 October 1991 13	1. FC Köln	1–1	MSV Duisburg	Cologne
15:30	Banach 86'	Report	Kober 24'	Stadium: Müngersdorfer Stadion; Attendance: 18,000; Referee: Karl-Heinz Gläser

19 October 1991 14	Karlsruher SC	0–1	1. FC Köln	Karlsruhe
15:30		Report	Littbarski 85'	Stadium: Wildparkstadion; Attendance: 17,000; Referee: Edgar Steinborn

26 October 1991 15	1. FC Köln	5–0	Werder Bremen	Cologne
15:30	H. Fuchs 7'; Heldt 41', 81'; Banach 43'; Sturm 87'	Report		Stadium: Müngersdorfer Stadion; Attendance: 19,000; Referee: Aron Schmidhuber

2 November 1991 16	Hansa Rostock	1–1	1. FC Köln	Rostock
15:30	Persigehl 51'	Report	H. Fuchs 10'	Stadium: Ostseestadion; Attendance: 15,000; Referee: Hans-Joachim Osmers

9 November 1991 17	1. FC Köln	4–1	Fortuna Düsseldorf	Cologne
15:30	H. Fuchs 4'; Banach 45', 56'; Greiner 68'	Report	Demandt 28'	Stadium: Müngersdorfer Stadion; Attendance: 20,000; Referee: Hans Scheuerer

16 November 1991 18	Schalke 04	3–0	1. FC Köln	Gelsenkirchen
15:30	Anderbrügge 17' (pen.); Borodyuk 72'; Sendscheid 80'	Report		Stadium: Parkstadion; Attendance: 61,400; Referee: Markus Merk

30 November 1991 20	1. FC Köln	1–0	VfL Bochum	Cologne
15:30	Sturm 42'	Report		Stadium: Müngersdorfer Stadion; Attendance: 13,000; Referee: Hermann Albrecht

7 December 1991 21	Stuttgarter Kickers	0–3	1. FC Köln	Stuttgart
15:30		Report	Trulsen 3'; H. Fuchs 57'; Greiner 90'	Stadium: Neckarstadion; Attendance: 4,821; Referee: Hans-Peter Dellwing

10 December 1991 19	1. FC Köln	1–1	Dynamo Dresden	Cologne
20:00	Ordenewitz 34'	Report	Scholz 22'	Stadium: Müngersdorfer Stadion; Attendance: 15,000; Referee: Manfred Amerell

14 December 1991 22	1. FC Kaiserslautern	2–1	1. FC Köln	Kaiserslautern
15:30	Funkel 33'; Kuntz 44'	Report	Heldt 52'	Stadium: Fritz-Walter-Stadion; Attendance: 38,500; Referee: Hans Fux

8 February 1992 23	1. FC Köln	0–0	Hamburger SV	Cologne
15:30		Report		Stadium: Müngersdorfer Stadion; Attendance: 19,000; Referee: Manfred Neuner

15 February 1991 24	Eintracht Frankfurt	1–2	1. FC Köln	Frankfurt
15:30	Falkenmayer 52'	Report	Giske 1'; Ordenewitz 44'	Stadium: Waldstadion; Attendance: 22,000; Referee: Aron Schmidhuber

22 February 1992 25	1. FC Köln	4–0	1. FC Nürnberg	Cologne
15:30	Giske 22'; Ordenewitz 31', 44'; Baumann 79'	Report		Stadium: Müngersdorfer Stadion; Attendance: 16,000; Referee: Wieland Ziller

15 February 1991 26	Bayern Munich	0–0	1. FC Köln	Munich
15:30		Report		Stadium: Olympiastadion; Attendance: 32,000; Referee: Alfons Berg

7 March 1992 27	1. FC Köln	1–2	Borussia Dortmund	Köln
15:30	Götz 57'	Report	Chapuisat 49'; Zorc 62'	Stadium: Müngersdorfer Stadion; Attendance: 46,000; Referee: Eugen Strigel

14 March 1992 28	VfB Stuttgart	1–0	1. FC Köln	Stuttgart
15:30	Sverrisson 83'	Report		Stadium: Neckarstadion; Attendance: 26,500; Referee: Wolfgang Mierswa

21 March 1992 29	1. FC Köln	1–1	Borussia Mönchengladbach	Köln
15:30	Giske 45'	Report	Max 5'	Stadium: Müngersdorfer Stadion; Attendance: 27,000; Referee: Lothar Löwer

27 March 1992 30	SG Wattenscheid 09	1–2	1. FC Köln	Bochum-Wattenscheid
20:00	Sané 48'	Report	Ordenewitz 29', 42'	Stadium: Lohrheidestadion; Attendance: 12,000; Referee: Michael Malbranc

4 April 1992 31	1. FC Köln	1–1	Bayer Leverkusen	Köln
15:30	Giske 8'	Report	Nehl 69'	Stadium: Müngersdorfer Stadion; Attendance: 23,000; Referee: Michael Prengel

11 April 1992 32	MSV Duisburg	1–3	1. FC Köln	Duisburg
15:30	Steininger 88'	Report	Baumann 74'; Steinmann 78'; H. Fuchs 90'	Stadium: Wedaustadion; Attendance: 19,300; Referee: Manfred Führer

18 April 1992 33	1. FC Köln	2–3	Karlsruher SC	Köln
15:30	Giske 47', 55'	Report	Rolff 26'; Krieg 36'; Reich 64'	Stadium: Müngersdorfer Stadion; Attendance: 13,000; Referee: Wolf-Günter Wiesel

25 April 1992 34	Werder Bremen	1–3	1. FC Köln	Bremen
15:30	Kohn 73'	Report	H. Fuchs 28'; Sturm 55'; Ordenewitz 64'	Stadium: Weser-Stadion; Attendance: 16,000; Referee: Hans-Peter Best

2 May 1992 35	1. FC Köln	3–1	Hansa Rostock	Köln
15:30	Sturm 40'; H. Fuchs 46'; Janßen 68'	Report	Persigehl 12'	Stadium: Müngersdorfer Stadion; Attendance: 14,000; Referee: Manfred Amerell

5 May 1992 36	Fortuna Düsseldorf	1–3	1. FC Köln	Düsseldorf
20:00	Rahn 33'	Report	Sturm 10'; H. Fuchs 69'; Ordenewitz 85'	Stadium: Rheinstadion; Attendance: 7,000; Referee: Hellmut Krug

9 May 1992 37	1. FC Köln	3–0	Schalke 04	Köln
15:30	Flick 45'; Andersen 70'; H. Fuchs 90'	Report		Stadium: Müngersdorfer Stadion; Attendance: 47,000; Referee: Hans Fux

16 May 1992 38	Dynamo Dresden	0–0	1. FC Köln	Dresden
15:30		Report		Stadium: Rudolf-Harbig-Stadion; Attendance: 26,000; Referee: Eugen Strigel

=== DFB Pokal ===
17 August 1991 Second round	Wernigeröder SV Rot-Weiß	0–4	1. FC Köln	Wernigerode
18:00		Report	Baumann 18'; Littbarski 39' (pen.); Banach 55'; H. Fuchs 67'	Attendance: 11,300; Referee: Uwe Kemmling

3 September 1991 Third round	Bayer Leverkusen	2–0	1. FC Köln	Leverkusen
20:00	Buncol 64'; Fischer 69'	Report		Stadium: Ulrich-Haberland-Stadion; Attendance: 20,000; Referee: Manfred Neuner

== Statistics ==
=== Squad statistics ===
No.	Pos	Nat	Player	Total		Bundesliga		DFB-Pokal	
No.	Pos	Nat	Player	Apps	Goals	Apps	Goals	Apps	Goals
	GK	(Germany) GER	Alexander Bade	1	0	1	0	0	0
	GK	(Germany) GER	Bodo Illgner	39	0	37	0	2	0
	DF	(Denmark) DEN	Henrik Andersen	22	1	21	1	1	0
	DF	(Germany) GER	Karsten Baumann	36	3	34	2	2	1
	DF	(Norway) NOR	Anders Giske	26	6	25	6	1	0
	DF	(Germany) GER	Frank Greiner	38	2	36	2	2	0
	DF	(Germany) GER	Alfons Higl	33	0	31	0	2	0
	DF	(Germany) GER	Olaf Janßen	5	1	5	1	0	0
	DF	(Denmark) DEN	Jann Jensen	18	0	16	0	2	0
	DF	(Germany) GER	André Trulsen	20	1	20	1	0	0
	DF	(Germany) GER	Patrick Weiser	1	0	1	0	0	0
	MF	(Germany) GER	Hansi Flick	21	1	21	1	0	0
	MF	(Germany) GER	Horst Heldt	33	3	31	3	2	0
	MF	(Germany) GER	Pierre Littbarski	38	2	36	1	2	1
	MF	(Poland) POL	Andrzej Rudy	2	0	1	0	1	0
	MF	(Germany) GER	Rico Steinmann	33	2	31	2	2	0
	FW	(Germany) GER	Maurice Banach	20	11	18	10	2	1
	FW	(Germany) GER	Henri Fuchs	36	11	34	10	2	1
	FW	(Germany) GER	Uwe Fuchs	3	0	3	0	0	0
	FW	(Germany) GER	Falko Götz	34	1	33	1	1	0
	FW	(Germany) GER	Peter Müller	2	0	2	0	0	0
	FW	(Germany) GER	Frank Ordenewitz	37	11	35	11	2	0
	FW	(Germany) GER	Ralf Sturm	23	5	22	5	1	0
