= 1991 DFB-Pokal final =

- Match programme cover
- Event: 1990–91 DFB-Pokal
Werder Bremen	1. FC Köln
1	1
- After extra time Werder Bremen won 4–3 on penalties
- Date: 22 June 1991
- Venue: Olympiastadion, Berlin
- Referee: Aron Schmidhuber (Ottobrunn)
- Attendance: 73,000

The 1991 DFB-Pokal final decided the winner of the 1990–91 DFB-Pokal, the 48th season of Germany's premier knockout football cup competition. It was played on 22 June 1991 at the Olympiastadion in Berlin. Werder Bremen won the match 4–3 on penalties against 1. FC Köln following a 1–1 draw after extra time to claim their second cup title, qualifying for the 1991–92 European Cup Winners' Cup and the 1991 DFB-Supercup.

== Route to the final ==
The DFB-Pokal began with 64 teams in a single-elimination knockout cup competition. There were a total of five rounds leading up to the final. Teams were drawn against each other, and the winner after 90 minutes would advance. If still tied, 30 minutes of extra time was played. If the score was still level, a replay would take place at the original away team's stadium. If still level after 90 minutes, 30 minutes of extra time was played. If the score was still level, a drawing of lots would decide who would advance to the next round.

Note: In all results below, the score of the finalist is given first (H: home; A: away).

Werder Bremen		Round	1. FC Köln
Opponent	Result	1990–91 DFB-Pokal	Opponent	Result
SpVgg Weiden (A)	2–1	Round 1	VfL Wolfsburg (A)	6–1
FC St. Pauli (H)	2–0	Round 2	1. FC Kaiserslautern (A)	2–1
Schalke 04 (H)	3–1	Round of 16	SV Meppen (H)	1–0
Hessen Kassel (A)	2–0	Quarter-finals	VfB Stuttgart (H)	1–0 (a.e.t.)
Eintracht Frankfurt (A) (H)	2–2 (a.e.t.); 6–3 (replay)	Semi-finals	MSV Duisburg (A) (H)	0–0 (a.e.t.); 3–0 (replay)

== Match ==
=== Details ===
22 June 1991
19:30 CEST

Werder Bremen	1–1 (a.e.t.)	1. FC Köln
Eilts 48'	Report	Banach 62'
Penalties
Allofs (penalty missed); Rufer (penalty scored); Bratseth (penalty scored); Harttgen (penalty scored); Borowka (penalty scored)	4–3	(penalty missed) Rudy; (penalty scored) Higl; (penalty missed) Littbarski; (penalty scored) Banach; (penalty scored) Götz

Olympiastadion, Berlin
Attendance: 73,000
Referee: Aron Schmidhuber (Ottobrunn)

Werder Bremen	1. FC Köln

GK	1	(Germany) Oliver Reck
SW	4	(Norway) Rune Bratseth
CB	8	(Germany) Miroslav Votava (c)
CB	6	(Germany) Uli Borowka
RWB	5	(Germany) Thomas Wolter
LWB	3	(Germany) Marco Bode
CM	2	(Germany) Günter Hermann		(substituted off) 76'
CM	7	(Germany) Dieter Eilts
CM	10	(Germany) Frank Neubarth	Booked	(substituted off) 72'
CF	11	(New Zealand) Wynton Rufer
CF	9	(Germany) Klaus Allofs
Substitutes:
DF	13	(Germany) Gunnar Sauer		(substituted on) 76'
MF	14	(Germany) Uwe Harttgen		(substituted on) 72'
Manager:
(Germany) Otto Rehhagel

GK	1	(Germany) Bodo Illgner
SW	2	(Denmark) Jann Jensen
CB	4	(Germany) Andreas Gielchen	Booked
CB	6	(Germany) Karsten Baumann
RWB	8	(Germany) Frank Greiner	Booked
LWB	10	(Denmark) Henrik Andersen		(substituted off) 96'
CM	3	(Germany) Alfons Higl
CM	7	(Germany) Pierre Littbarski (c)
CM	11	(Germany) Ralf Sturm		(substituted off) 60'
CF	5	(Germany) Falko Götz
CF	9	(Germany) Maurice Banach
Substitutes:
MF	13	(Germany) Horst Heldt		(substituted on) 59'
MF	14	(Poland) Andrzej Rudy		(substituted on) 96'
Manager:
(Germany) Erich Rutemöller

Match rules

- 90 minutes.
- 30 minutes of extra time if necessary.
- Penalty shoot-out if scores still level.
- Maximum of two substitutions.
