= List of 1. FC Köln records and statistics =

This article has details on 1. FC Köln statistics.

== Recent seasons ==
=== By season ===
Winners *	Runners-up ¤	Promoted ↑	Relegated ↓

Season	Division	Pld	W	D	L	GF	GA	GD	Pts	Pos	Avg. Att.	Cup	Top goalscorer(s)	Goals
1963–64	Bundesliga	30	17	11	2	78	40	38	45	1 *	31,904	QF	Karl-Heinz Thielen	16
1964–65	Bundesliga	30	14	10	6	66	45	21	38	2 ¤	31,933	R1	Christian Müller	19
1965–66	Bundesliga	34	19	6	9	74	41	33	44	5	27,176	R2	Hannes Löhr	18
1966–67	Bundesliga	34	14	9	11	48	48	0	37	7	25,176	R2	Hannes Löhr	13
1967–68	Bundesliga	34	17	4	13	68	52	16	38	4	23,176	W *	Hannes Löhr	27
1968–69	Bundesliga	34	13	6	15	47	56	−9	32	14	24,882	R1	Carl-Heinz Rühl	14
1969–70	Bundesliga	34	20	3	11	83	38	45	43	4	25,118	RU ¤	Hannes Löhr	19
1970–71	Bundesliga	34	11	11	12	46	56	−10	33	11	18,559	RU ¤	Bernd Rupp	14
1971–72	Bundesliga	34	15	13	6	64	44	20	43	4	15,118	SF	Bernd Rupp	16
1972–73	Bundesliga	34	16	11	7	66	51	15	43	2 ¤	12,753	RU ¤	Hannes Löhr	10
1973–74	Bundesliga	34	16	7	11	69	56	13	39	5	17,135	QF	Dieter Müller	17
1974–75	Bundesliga	34	17	7	10	77	51	26	41	5	18,500	R4	Dieter Müller	24
1975–76	Bundesliga	34	14	11	9	62	45	17	39	4	25,941	QF	Hannes Löhr	15
1976–77	Bundesliga	34	17	6	11	83	61	22	40	5	32,306	W *	Dieter Müller	34
1977–78	Bundesliga	34	22	4	8	86	41	45	48	1 *	35,235	W *	Dieter Müller	24
1978–79	Bundesliga	34	13	12	9	55	47	8	38	6	22,765	R4	Dieter Müller	8
1979–80	Bundesliga	34	14	9	11	72	55	17	37	5	27,824	RU ¤	Dieter Müller	21
1980–81	Bundesliga	34	12	10	12	54	55	−1	34	8	19,765	R2	Dieter Müller	17
1981–82	Bundesliga	34	18	9	7	72	38	34	45	2 ¤	25,147	R1	Tony Woodcock	15
1982–83	Bundesliga	34	17	9	8	69	42	27	43	5	17,971	W *	Pierre Littbarski	16
1983–84	Bundesliga	34	16	6	12	70	57	13	38	6	17,442	R3	Klaus Allofs	20
1984–85	Bundesliga	34	18	4	12	69	66	3	40	3	18,059	R2	Klaus Allofs	26
1985–86	Bundesliga	34	9	11	14	46	59	−13	29	13	13,615	R2	Pierre Littbarski	8
1986–87	Bundesliga	34	13	9	12	50	53	−3	35	10	16,588	R3	Klaus Allofs	14
1987–88	Bundesliga	34	18	12	4	57	28	29	48	3	22,412	R2	Flemming Povlsen	13
1988–89	Bundesliga	34	18	9	7	58	30	28	45	2 ¤	20,941	R2	Thomas Allofs	17
1989–90	Bundesliga	34	17	9	8	54	44	10	43	2 ¤	22,294	R3	Falko Götz	11
1990–91	Bundesliga	34	13	11	10	50	43	7	37	7	21,235	RU ¤	Maurice Banach	13
1991–92	Bundesliga	38	13	18	7	58	41	17	44	4	23,105	R3	Frank Ordenewitz	11
1992–93	Bundesliga	34	12	4	18	41	51	−10	28	12	29,824	R2	Frank Ordenewitz	9
1993–94	Bundesliga	34	14	6	14	49	51	−2	34	11	31,065	R3	Toni Polster	17
1994–95	Bundesliga	34	11	10	13	54	54	0	32	10	31,765	SF	Toni Polster	17
1995–96	Bundesliga	34	9	13	12	33	35	−2	40	12	32,882	R1	Toni Polster	11
1996–97	Bundesliga	34	13	5	16	62	62	0	44	10	31,088	R2	Toni Polster	21
1997–98	Bundesliga	34	10	6	18	49	64	−15	36	17 ↓	29,824	R1	Toni Polster	13
1998–99	2. Bundesliga	34	12	9	13	46	53	−7	45	10	14,488	R1	Dorinel Munteanu	7
1999–2000	2. Bundesliga	34	19	8	13	68	39	29	65	1 ↑	28,853	R4	Dirk Lottner	14
2000–01	Bundesliga	34	12	10	12	59	52	7	46	10	34,339	R1	Dirk Lottner	10
2001–02	Bundesliga	34	7	8	19	26	61	−35	29	17 ↓	31,147	SF	Dirk Lottner	9
2002–03	2. Bundesliga	34	18	11	5	63	45	18	65	2 ↑	26,459	QF	Matthias Scherz	18
2003–04	Bundesliga	34	6	5	23	32	57	−25	23	18 ↓	40,058	R3	Lukas Podolski	10
2004–05	2. Bundesliga	34	20	7	7	62	33	29	67	1 ↑	38,482	R2	Lukas Podolski	24
2005–06	Bundesliga	34	7	9	18	49	71	−22	30	17 ↓	48,942	R1	Lukas Podolski	12
2006–07	2. Bundesliga	34	12	10	12	49	50	−1	46	9	42,194	R3	Patrick Helmes	14
2007–08	2. Bundesliga	34	17	9	8	62	44	18	60	3 ↑	43,763	R1	Milivoje Novakovic	20
2008–09	Bundesliga	34	11	6	17	35	50	−15	39	12	49,316	R2	Milivoje Novakovic	16
2009–10	Bundesliga	34	9	11	14	33	42	−9	38	13	48,059	QF	Milivoje Novakovic	6
2010–11	Bundesliga	34	13	5	16	47	62	−15	44	10	47,782	R3	Milivoje Novakovic	17
2011–12	Bundesliga	34	8	6	20	39	75	−36	30	17 ↓	47,482	R2	Lukas Podolski	18
2012–13	2. Bundesliga	34	14	12	8	43	33	10	54	5	40,688	R3	Anthony Ujah	13
2013–14	2. Bundesliga	34	19	11	4	53	20	23	68	1 ↑	46,235	R3	Patrick Helmes	12
2014–15	Bundesliga	34	9	13	12	34	40	−6	40	12	48,329	R3	Anthony Ujah	10
2015–16	Bundesliga	34	10	13	11	38	42	−4	43	9	48,676	R2	Anthony Modeste	15
2016–17	Bundesliga	34	12	13	9	51	42	9	49	5	49,571	R3	Anthony Modeste	25
2017–18	Bundesliga	34	5	7	22	35	70	−35	22	18 ↓	48,776	R3	Leonardo Bittencourt, Simon Terodde	5
2018–19	2. Bundesliga	34	19	6	9	84	47	37	63	1 ↑	49,547	R2	Simon Terodde	29
2019–20	Bundesliga	34	10	6	18	51	69	−18	36	14	35,094	R2	Jhon Córdoba	13
2020–21	Bundesliga	34	8	9	17	34	60	−26	33	16	0	R3	Elvis Rexhbeçaj	5
2021–22	Bundesliga	34	14	10	10	52	49	+3	52	7	32,024	R3	Anthony Modeste	20
2022–23	Bundesliga	34	10	12	12	49	54	−5	42	11	49,618	R1	Ellyes Skhiri	7
2023–24	Bundesliga	34	5	12	17	28	60	−32	27	17 ↓	49,829	R2	Davie Selke	6
2024–25	2. Bundesliga	34	18	7	9	53	38	+15	61	1 ↑	49,900	QF	Damion Downs, Tim Lemperle	10
2025–26	Bundesliga	34	7	11	16	49	63	−14	32	14	49,918	R2	Said El Mala	13

=== By competition ===
As of 14 May 2022

Competition	Pld	W	D	L	GF	GA	GD	Win%
Bundesliga	1,696	661	432	603	2,754	2,542	+212	38.97
2. Bundesliga	306	150	83	73	530	364	+166	49.02
DFB-Pokal	207	127	27	53	557	273	+284	61.35
Total	2,209	938	542	729	3,841	3,179	+662	42.46

== In European football ==
=== By season ===
As of 3 November 2022

Key

- Pld = Matches played
- W = Matches won
- D = Matches drawn
- L = Matches lost
- GF = Goals for
- GA = Goals against
- GD = Goal difference
- Grp = Group stage
- GS2 = Second group stage
- R1 = First round
- R2 = Second round
- R3 = Third round
- R4 = Fourth round
- R16 = Round of 16
- QF = Quarter-final
- SF = Semi-final

Key to colours and symbols:

W	Winners
RU	Runners-up
SF	Third/fourth place

1. FC Köln record in European football by season
Season	Competition	Pld	W	D	L	GF	GA	GD	Round
1961–62	Inter-Cities Fairs Cup	3	1	0	2	7	9	–2	R1
1962–63	European Cup	2	1	0	1	5	8	–3	R1
1963-64	Inter-Cities Fairs Cup	8	5	1	2	17	12	+5	SF
1964–65	European Cup	7	2	5	0	7	4	+3	QF
1965–66	Inter-Cities Fairs Cup	6	4	0	2	23	8	+15	R16
1967–68	Inter-Cities Fairs Cup	4	2	1	1	7	6	+1	R2
1968–69	European Cup Winners' Cup	8	5	1	2	16	9	+7	SF
1970–71	Inter-Cities Fairs Cup	10	6	1	3	15	8	+7	SF
1971–72	UEFA Cup	4	2	1	1	7	7	0	R2
1972–73	UEFA Cup	6	3	1	2	14	8	+6	R16
1973–74	UEFA Cup	8	3	1	4	13	8	+5	QF
1974–75	UEFA Cup	10	6	1	3	27	14	+13	SF
1975–76	UEFA Cup	4	2	0	2	5	5	0	R2
1976–77	UEFA Cup	6	4	1	1	12	7	+5	R16
1977–78	European Cup Winners' Cup	2	0	1	1	5	5	0	R1
1978–79	European Cup	8	4	3	1	15	7	+8	SF
1980–81	UEFA Cup	10	5	1	4	22	9	+13	SF
1982–83	UEFA Cup	6	4	0	2	13	4	+9	R16
1983–84	European Cup Winners' Cup	4	2	0	2	12	7	+5	R16
1984–85	UEFA Cup	8	5	0	3	10	7	+3	QF
1985–86	UEFA Cup	12	7	3	2	27	15	+12	RU
1988–89	UEFA Cup	6	3	2	1	11	7	+4	R16
1989–90	UEFA Cup	10	5	3	2	15	7	+8	SF
1990–91	UEFA Cup	6	2	2	2	6	4	+2	R16
1992–93	UEFA Cup	2	1	0	1	2	3	–1	R1
2017–18	UEFA Europa League	6	2	0	4	7	8	–1	Grp
2022–23	UEFA Europa Conference League	8	3	2	3	12	10	+2	Grp

=== By competition ===
As of 3 November 2022

Competition	Pld	W	D	L	GF	GA	GD	Win%
Champions League / European Cup	17	7	8	2	27	19	+8	41.18
Cup Winners' Cup / European Cup Winners' Cup	14	7	2	5	33	21	+12	50.00
Europa League / UEFA Cup / Inter-Cities Fairs Cup	135	72	19	44	260	156	+104	53.33
Europa Conference League	8	3	2	3	12	10	+2	37.50
Total	174	89	31	54	332	206	+126	51.15

== Honours ==
- German Champions
  - Winners: 1961–62, 1963–64, 1977–78
  - Runners-up: 1959–60, 1962–63, 1964–65, 1972–73, 1981–82, 1988–89, 1989–90
- 2. Bundesliga
  - Winners: 1999–2000, 2004–05, 2013–14, 2018–19
  - Runners-up: 2002–03
- DFB-Pokal
  - Winners: 1967–68, 1976–77, 1977–78, 1982–83
  - Runners-up: 1953–54, 1969–70, 1970–71, 1972–73, 1979–80, 1990–91
- UEFA Europa League / UEFA Cup
  - Runners-up: 1985–86

=== Regional ===
- Oberliga West
  - Winners: 1953–54, 1959–60, 1960–61, 1961–62, 1962–63
  - Runners-up: 1952–53, 1957–58, 1958–59

=== Doubles ===
- 1977–78: League and DFB-Pokal

=== Reserve team ===
- German amateur champions: 1981

=== Youth ===
- German Under 19 championship
  - Champions: 1970–71
  - Runners-up: 1973–74, 1982–83, 1991–92
- Under 19 Bundesliga Division West
  - Champions: 2007–08
  - Runners-up: 2003–04, 2009–10, 2013–14, 2014–15
- Under 19 Juniors DFB-Pokal
  - Champions: 2012–13
  - Runners-up: 1990–91, 1993–94
- German Under 17 championship
  - Champions: 1989–90, 2010–11, 2018–19
- Under 17 Bundesliga Division West
  - Champions: 2010–11, 2011–12
  - Runners-up: 2008–09, 2018–19

== Club records ==
=== Record wins ===
Home

- 13–0 against Union Luxembourg, 5 October 1965 (Inter-Cities Fairs Cup)
- 9–1 against Viking FK, 7 November 1972 (UEFA Cup)
- 8–0 against Tottenham Hotspur, 22 July 1995 (Intertoto Cup)
- 8–0 against Schalke 04, 8 November 1969 (League)
- 8–0 against Eintracht Braunschweig, 8 September 1979 (League)
- 8–1 against Dynamo Dresden, 10 November 2018 (League)
- 7–0 against Schalke 04, 9 September 1967 (League)
- 7–0 against Eintracht Frankfurt, 29 October 1983 (League)
- 7–1 against Tennis Borussia Berlin, 31 May 1975 (League)
- 7–1 against Werder Bremen, 21 January 2023 (League)

Away

- 9–1 against BFC Dynamo, 19 August 2018 (Cup)
- 6–0 against SC Tasmania 1900 Berlin, 30 October 1965 (League)
- 6–0 against VSG Altglienicke, 12 September 2020 (Cup)
- 5–0 against FC St. Pauli, 29 April 1978 (League)
- 5–0 against Werder Bremen, 24 May 1980 (League)
- 5–0 against Hertha BSC, 22 February 2020 (League)
- 4–0 against Barcelona, 5 November 1980 (UEFA Cup)

=== Record defeats ===
Home

- 1–6 against Borussia Dortmund, 23 August 1994 (League)
- 1–6 against VfB Stuttgart, 1 June 1991 (League)
- 1–6 against Borussia Dortmund, 25 March 2012 (League)
- 1–3 against Inter Milan, 20 March 1985 (UEFA Cup) (heaviest home defeat in European football)

Away

- 1–8 against Dundee, 5 September 1962 (European Cup) (heaviest away defeat in European football)
- 0–7 against Bayern Munich, 15 May 1971 (League)
- 0–6 against VfL Wolfsburg, 21 October 2000 (League)
- 0–6 against 1899 Hoffenheim, 31 March 2018 (League)

=== Goalscorers ===
- Most goals in a single match: Dieter Müller, 6 goals (against Werder Bremen, 17 August 1977)
- Youngest goalscorer: Pierre Littbarski, 18 years, 4 months and 24 days (against Fortuna Düsseldorf, League, 9 September 1978)
- Oldest goalscorer: Morten Olsen, 39 years, 6 months and 18 days (against VfL Bochum, 4 March 1989)

=== All-time Bundesliga table ===
1. FC Köln led the standings since the inception of the Bundesliga in 1963 (except of matchday 4 in the very same season).
In the 1983–84 Bundesliga season the FC Bayern Munich took the lead from 1. FC Köln.
Currently 1. FC Köln is ranked in ninth place in the all-time Bundesliga table.

=== All-time Oberliga West table ===
The Oberliga West was the highest level of the German football league system in the west of Germany from 1947 until the formation of the Bundesliga in 1963.
With the reintroduction of the German championship in 1948, the winner and runners-up of the Oberliga West went on to the finals tournament with the other five Oberliga champions.
1. FC Köln is on 2nd place in the All-time Oberliga West table.

== Bundesliga records (incomplete) ==
=== Exclusive ===
- Scoring in every game of the season (30 games): 1963–64 Bundesliga
- Highest number of scored goals in a game by a single player: 6 by Dieter Müller (matchday 3 of 1977–78 Bundesliga)
- Highest number of goalless draws in a season: 9 (2014–15 Bundesliga)
- Highest number of consecutive games with a clean sheet by a goalkeeper from debut: 4 by Timo Horn (matchday 1 to 4 of 2014–15 Bundesliga)
- Highest number of consecutive minutes without conceding by a goalkeeper from debut: 365 by Timo Horn (minute 1 of matchday 1 to minute 6 of matchday 5 of 2014–15 Bundesliga)
- Highest number of consecutive games without scoring: 10 (matchday 15 to 24 of 2001–02 Bundesliga)
- Highest number of consecutive minutes without scoring: 1,033 (from minute 31 of matchday 14 to minute 74 of matchday 25 of 2001–02 Bundesliga)

=== Split ===
- Highest number of consecutive games with a clean sheet away: 6 (matchday 6 to 16 of 2009–10 Bundesliga)
- Lowest number of losses in a season at home (34 games): 0 (1972–73 Bundesliga and 1987–88 Bundesliga)
- Highest number of goals in a game: 1. FC Köln 8–4 Tennis Borussia Berlin (1976–77 Bundesliga)
- Highest number of viewers in a game: 88.075 Hertha BSC against 1. FC Köln (matchday 6 of 1969–70 Bundesliga)
