= 2008–09 3. Liga =

1st season of the 3. Liga

3. Liga
- Season: 2008–09
- Champions: 1. FC Union Berlin
- Promoted: Union Berlin; Fortuna Düsseldorf; SC Paderborn (via play-off)
- Relegated: VfR Aalen; Stuttgarter Kickers; Kickers Emden (due to licensing issues)
- Matches: 380
- Goals: 956 (2.52 per match)
- Top goalscorer: Anton Fink (21)
- Biggest home win: Paderborn 6–0 Burghausen
- Biggest away win: Jena 0–6 Stuttgart II
- Highest scoring: Br'schweig 5–5 Düsseldorf

The 2008–09 3. Liga was the inaugural season for the newly formed tier III of the German football league system. The inaugural game was played on 25 July 2008 between FC Rot-Weiß Erfurt and Dynamo Dresden, ending with a 1–0 win for Dresden. The last games were played on 23 May 2009. 1. FC Union Berlin were the inaugural champions, securing first place on 10 May 2009. Runners-up Fortuna Düsseldorf were also promoted. Third-placed team SC Paderborn 07 played a relegation/promotion play-off against the 16th-placed team from 2. Bundesliga, VfL Osnabrück, winning both games and earning promotion. Kickers Emden, VfR Aalen, and Stuttgarter Kickers were relegated to the Regionalliga.

== Qualified teams ==
Location of teams in the 2008–09 3. Fußball-Liga

The following teams were relegated to 3. Liga from 2007–08 2. Bundesliga:

- Kickers Offenbach
- FC Erzgebirge Aue
- SC Paderborn 07
- FC Carl Zeiss Jena

The following teams qualified through Regionalliga North:

- Fortuna Düsseldorf
- 1. FC Union Berlin
- SV Werder Bremen II
- Wuppertaler SV Borussia
- FC Rot-Weiß Erfurt
- Dynamo Dresden
- Kickers Emden
- Eintracht Braunschweig

The following teams qualified through Regionalliga South:

- VfB Stuttgart II
- VfR Aalen
- SV Sandhausen
- SpVgg Unterhaching
- SV Wacker Burghausen
- FC Bayern Munich II
- SSV Jahn Regensburg
- Stuttgarter Kickers

== Teams, Head Coach, Cities and Stadiums ==
Team	Head Coach	City	Stadium	Capacity
VfR Aalen	(Germany) Rainer Scharinger	Aalen	Städtisches Waldstadion	11,183
FC Erzgebirge Aue	(Germany) Heiko Weber	Aue	Erzgebirgsstadion	16,350
1. FC Union Berlin	(Germany) Uwe Neuhaus	Berlin	Friedrich-Ludwig-Jahn-Sportpark^{1}	19,708
Eintracht Braunschweig	(Germany) Torsten Lieberknecht	Braunschweig	Eintracht-Stadion	23,500
SV Werder Bremen II	(Germany) Thomas Wolter	Bremen	Weserstadion Platz 11	5,500
SV Wacker Burghausen	(Germany) Ralf Santelli (interim)	Burghausen	Wacker Arena	8,400
Dynamo Dresden	(Netherlands) Ruud Kaiser	Dresden	Rudolf Harbig Stadion	23,940
Fortuna Düsseldorf	(Germany) Norbert Meier	Düsseldorf	LTU-Arena	51,500
Kickers Emden	(Germany) Stefan Emmerling	Emden	Embdena-Stadion	7,200
FC Rot-Weiß Erfurt	(Germany) Henri Fuchs (interim)	Erfurt	Steigerwaldstadion	20,000
FC Carl Zeiss Jena	(Germany) Marc Fascher	Jena	Ernst-Abbe-Sportfeld	15,610
FC Bayern Munich II	(Germany) Mehmet Scholl (interim)	Munich	Grünwalder Stadion	10,240
Kickers Offenbach	(Germany) Hans-Jürgen Boysen	Offenbach am Main	Bieberer Berg Stadion	31,500
SC Paderborn 07	(Germany) André Schubert (interim)	Paderborn	Paragon Arena	15,300
SSV Jahn Regensburg	(Germany) Markus Weinzierl	Regensburg	Jahnstadion	11,800
SV Sandhausen	(Germany) Gerd Dais	Sandhausen	Hardtwaldstadion	11,544
Stuttgarter Kickers	(Germany) Rainer Kraft	Stuttgart	GAZi-Stadion auf der Waldau	11,436
VfB Stuttgart II	(Germany) Rainer Adrion	Stuttgart	GAZi-Stadion auf der Waldau	11,436
SpVgg Unterhaching	(Austria) Ralph Hasenhüttl	Unterhaching	Generali Sportpark	15,053
Wuppertaler SV Borussia	(Germany) Uwe Fuchs	Wuppertal	Zoo-Stadion	28,000

Notes

1. 1. FC Union Berlin played its 2008–09 home matches at Friedrich-Ludwig-Jahn-Sportpark because their own ground Alte Försterei was undergoing renovation.

=== Managerial changes ===
Team	Outgoing manager	Manner of departure	Date of vacancy	Replaced by	Date of appointment
VfR Aalen	(Germany) Edgar Schmitt	Sacked	27 August 2008	(Germany) Jürgen Kohler	28 August 2008
FC Carl Zeiss Jena	(Germany) Henning Bürger	Sacked	14 September 2008	(Netherlands) René van Eck	22 September 2008
Stuttgarter Kickers	(Germany) Stefan Minkwitz	Sacked	21 September 2008	(Germany) Edgar Schmitt	21 September 2008
VfR Aalen	(Germany) Jürgen Kohler	Resigned	15 November 2008	(Germany) Petrik Sander	21 November 2008
SSV Jahn Regensburg	(Germany) Thomas Kristl	Sacked	24 November 2008	(Germany) Markus Weinzierl	24 November 2008
Wuppertaler SV Borussia	(Germany) Christoph John	Sacked	22 December 2008	(Germany) Uwe Fuchs	23 December 2008
FC Carl Zeiss Jena	(Netherlands) René van Eck	Sacked	23 March 2009	(Germany) Marc Fascher	23 March 2009
Stuttgarter Kickers	(Germany) Edgar Schmitt	Resigned	14 April 2009	(Germany) Rainer Kraft	14 April 2009
SV Wacker Burghausen	(Germany) Günter Güttler	Sacked	15 April 2009	(Germany) Ralf Santelli (interim)	15 April 2009
FC Bayern Munich II	(Germany) Hermann Gerland	"Promoted" to interim assistant coach of first team	27 April 2009	(Germany) Mehmet Scholl (interim)	27 April 2009
FC Rot-Weiß Erfurt	(Germany) Karsten Baumann	Sacked	28 April 2009	(Germany) Henri Fuchs (interim)	28 April 2009
VfR Aalen	(Germany) Petrik Sander	Resigned	5 May 2009	(Germany) Rainer Scharinger	6 May 2009
SC Paderborn 07	(Bulgaria) Pavel Dotchev	Sacked	13 May 2009	(Germany) André Schubert	13 May 2009

== League table ==
Pos	Team	Pld	W	D	L	GF	GA	GD	Pts	Promotion, qualification or relegation
1	Union Berlin (C, P)	38	22	12	4	59	23	+36	78	Promotion to 2. Bundesliga and qualification for DFB-Pokal
2	Fortuna Düsseldorf (P)	38	20	9	9	54	33	+21	69	Promotion to 2. Bundesliga and qualification for DFB-Pokal
3	SC Paderborn 07 (O, P)	38	20	8	10	68	38	+30	68	Qualification to promotion play-offs and DFB-Pokal
4	SpVgg Unterhaching	38	20	7	11	57	46	+11	67	Qualification for DFB-Pokal
5	Bayern Munich II (Note: Reserve teams are ineligible for promotion or DFB-Pokal qualification.)	38	14	17	7	54	38	+16	59	
6	Kickers Emden (Note: Kickers Emden retracted their application for a 3. Liga license for the 2009–10 season and were automatically relegated. SV Wacker Burghausen took their spot.) (R)	38	16	11	11	45	44	+1	59	Relegation to Oberliga Niedersachsen
7	Kickers Offenbach	38	12	16	10	40	35	+5	52	
8	SV Sandhausen	38	12	14	12	58	52	+6	50	
9	Dynamo Dresden	38	13	11	14	46	46	0	50	
10	Rot-Weiß Erfurt	38	13	11	14	46	48	−2	50	
11	VfB Stuttgart II	38	13	10	15	61	50	+11	49	
12	Erzgebirge Aue	38	12	12	14	43	43	0	48	
13	Eintracht Braunschweig	38	12	9	17	46	51	−5	45	
14	Wuppertaler SV	38	11	12	15	36	45	−9	45	
15	Jahn Regensburg	38	11	12	15	37	51	−14	45	
16	Carl Zeiss Jena	38	10	11	17	41	59	−18	41	
17	Werder Bremen II	38	10	10	18	49	58	−9	40	
18	Wacker Burghausen	38	10	10	18	40	65	−25	40	
19	VfR Aalen (R)	38	8	15	15	38	60	−22	39	Relegation to Regionalliga
20	Stuttgarter Kickers (Note: Stuttgarter Kickers received a three-point deduction due to failed debt repayments to the German Football Association.) (R)	38	7	11	20	38	71	−33	29	Relegation to Regionalliga

Source: www.kicker.de (German)
Rules for classification: 1) points; 2) goal difference; 3) number of goals scored.
(C) Champions; (O) Play-off winners; (P) Promoted; (R) Relegated

== Results ==
Home \ Away	AAL	AUE	UNB	EBS	BR2	WBU	SGD	F95	KEM	ERF	JEN	MU2	KOF	SCP	JRE	SVS	SKI	ST2	UNT	WUP
VfR Aalen	—	0–0	1–4	2–0	1–0	0–0	4–3	1–2	0–0	0–2	3–2	0–0	1–1	3–3	1–1	0–0	3–1	2–1	2–3	0–0
Erzgebirge Aue	0–0	—	0–1	0–2	0–1	2–0	1–1	0–1	3–0	1–0	5–0	1–1	2–1	0–2	1–0	2–2	0–2	0–3	1–1	1–0
Union Berlin	3–0	2–0	—	1–1	0–0	4–0	2–1	1–0	2–0	1–1	1–0	0–0	1–0	3–2	2–0	2–2	5–1	3–1	0–1	0–0
Eintracht Braunschweig	2–0	1–1	0–2	—	1–1	2–0	0–1	5–5	2–1	1–1	1–2	0–1	4–0	2–0	0–3	3–3	1–1	2–0	4–0	2–1
Werder Bremen II	3–1	4–2	1–2	1–1	—	2–2	0–1	2–0	0–1	2–1	0–0	0–0	3–1	2–3	2–2	4–3	2–0	4–5	1–0	1–1
Wacker Burghausen	1–0	0–4	0–0	0–2	2–2	—	0–3	0–4	3–1	1–4	0–2	0–0	0–0	2–0	0–1	2–3	2–0	2–1	5–1	2–0
Dynamo Dresden	1–1	3–1	0–1	1–1	2–1	3–1	—	0–2	1–2	1–1	2–0	3–2	1–1	0–3	3–1	1–1	1–2	1–0	1–0	1–1
Fortuna Düsseldorf	1–1	0–0	0–1	2–1	1–0	3–1	1–0	—	1–1	3–0	1–0	1–1	1–0	1–4	3–1	3–2	2–0	1–1	0–0	3–1
Kickers Emden	5–2	1–1	3–2	1–0	3–1	1–1	2–2	1–0	—	1–0	3–1	0–2	1–1	1–2	0–0	3–0	0–1	2–1	0–4	1–0
Rot-Weiß Erfurt	0–0	2–0	1–1	2–1	3–1	0–3	0–1	2–0	0–1	—	2–1	1–1	1–1	1–4	4–1	1–1	3–2	1–0	4–1	2–2
Carl Zeiss Jena	1–1	3–2	1–2	2–0	3–1	2–2	0–0	1–0	1–1	1–1	—	0–2	0–2	2–4	0–0	2–0	0–0	0–6	4–3	0–0
Bayern Munich II	4–0	2–3	2–1	0–1	1–1	3–1	1–0	0–1	4–0	1–0	2–1	—	1–1	2–1	2–2	2–1	3–3	1–1	0–0	2–0
Kickers Offenbach	2–1	0–0	1–1	2–0	1–0	2–0	2–2	0–2	0–0	0–0	2–1	2–0	—	0–0	1–1	0–3	4–0	2–0	3–1	1–2
SC Paderborn	4–0	0–0	0–0	2–1	0–2	6–0	1–2	0–0	2–0	2–0	2–0	2–1	0–0	—	3–1	1–2	2–0	1–1	1–1	0–1
Jahn Regensburg	1–0	1–4	0–2	2–0	1–0	1–0	1–0	1–2	0–1	1–0	2–2	1–2	1–1	0–4	—	2–1	1–1	1–1	1–2	2–0
SV Sandhausen	1–2	0–2	0–0	0–1	3–1	1–1	2–2	2–0	2–1	2–0	2–2	3–3	0–2	4–0	3–0	—	2–0	1–1	3–1	1–1
Stuttgarter Kickers	1–4	1–2	2–2	3–1	3–2	0–0	2–1	0–2	1–1	1–2	0–3	0–0	0–1	0–3	1–1	0–1	—	4–4	2–1	0–1
VfB Stuttgart II	0–0	3–0	0–3	4–0	2–0	3–0	2–0	0–4	0–1	3–1	3–0	2–2	1–1	1–2	1–2	1–1	3–0	—	1–3	2–0
SpVgg Unterhaching	2–1	1–1	1–0	2–0	3–0	0–2	2–0	2–1	1–1	4–0	1–0	2–1	1–0	2–1	1–0	2–0	2–0	0–2	—	1–1
Wuppertaler SV Borussia	5–0	1–0	0–1	1–0	2–1	2–4	1–0	0–0	0–3	0–2	0–1	2–2	2–1	0–1	0–0	1–0	3–3	2–0	2–4	—

Source: DFB
Legend: Blue = home team win; Yellow = draw; Red = away team win.

== Top scorers ==
Source: www.kicker.de

21 goals

- (Germany) Anton Fink (SpVgg Unterhaching)

17 goals

- (Turkey) Sercan Güvenisik (SC Paderborn 07)
- (Germany) Torsten Oehrl (SV Werder Bremen II)

16 goals

- (Algeria) Karim Benyamina (1. FC Union Berlin)

15 goals

- (Germany) Thomas Müller (FC Bayern Munich II)

14 goals

- (Germany) Frank Löning (SC Paderborn 07)
- (Germany) Halil Savran (Dynamo Dresden)

12 goals

- (Italy) Massimo Cannizzaro (FC Rot-Weiß Erfurt)
- (Germany) Marco Sailer (VfR Aalen)
