= Frank Engel =

Frank Engel may refer to:

- Frank Engel (football manager) (born 1951), German football manager
- Frank Engel (minister) (1911–2006), Australian ecumenical leader and Aboriginal rights advocate, involved in the 1966 Wave Hill walk-off
- Frank Engel (politician) (born 1975), Member of the European Parliament from Luxembourg
