= Higl =

Higl is a surname. Notable people with the surname include:

- Alfons Higl (born 1964), German footballer and manager
- Nađa Higl (born 1987), Serbian swimmer
