= Otze =

Otze may refer to:

- Ötzi, a prehistoric man whose mummy was found in a glacier in 1991
- Frank Ordenewitz, a German footballer
