= Rainer Kraft =

Rainer Kraft may refer to:

- Rainer Kraft (football manager)
- Rainer Kraft (politician)
