= 1975–76 1. FC Köln season =

1. FC Köln
1975–76 season
- Manager: Georg Stollenwerk
- Stadium: Müngersdorfer Stadion
- Bundesliga: 4th
- DFB-Pokal: Quarter-finals
- UEFA Cup: Second round
- Top goalscorer: League: Hannes Löhr (15); All: Hannes Löhr (19)

During the 1975–76 German football season, 1. FC Köln competed in the Bundesliga, the DFB-Pokal and the UEFA Cup. It was the club's 13th consecutive season in the Bundesliga.

== Squad ==
Note: Flags indicate national team as defined under FIFA eligibility rules; some limited exceptions apply. Players may hold more than one non-FIFA nationality.

Pos.	Nation	Player
GK	GER	Toni Schumacher
GK	YUG	Slobodan Topalović
DF	GER	Bernd Cullmann
DF	GER	Roland Gerber
DF	GER	Herbert Hein
DF	GER	Harald Konopka
DF	GER	Dieter Schwabe
DF	GER	Gerd Strack
DF	GER	Wolfgang Weber
DF	GER	Herbert Zimmermann

Pos.	Nation	Player
MF	GER	Heinz Flohe
MF	GER	Jürgen Glowacz
MF	GER	Hans Otto Hiestermann
MF	GER	Herbert Neumann
MF	GER	Wolfgang Overath
MF	GER	Dieter Prestin
MF	GER	Günter Schäfer
MF	GER	Heinz Simmet
FW	GER	Matthias Brücken
FW	GER	Detlev Lauscher
FW	GER	Hannes Löhr
FW	GER	Dieter Müller
FW	GER	Günter Weber
FW	SWE	Benny Wendt

== Competitions ==
=== Bundesliga ===
==== League table ====
Pos	Team	Pld	W	D	L	GF	GA	GD	Pts	Qualification or relegation
2	Hamburger SV	34	17	7	10	59	32	+27	41	Qualification to Cup Winners' Cup first round
3	Bayern Munich	34	15	10	9	72	50	+22	40	Qualification to European Cup first round (Note: Bayern Munich won the 1975–76 European Cup and thereby automatically qualified as defending champions. As a consequence, their original UEFA Cup spot earned through league placement was transferred to sixth-placed Schalke 04.)
4	1. FC Köln	34	14	11	9	62	45	+17	39	Qualification to UEFA Cup first round (Note: As Hamburger SV qualified for the Cup Winners' Cup, their UEFA Cup spot was transferred to DFB-Pokal runners-up 1. FC Kaiserslautern.)
5	Eintracht Braunschweig	34	14	11	9	52	48	+4	39	Qualification to UEFA Cup first round
6	Schalke 04	34	13	11	10	76	55	+21	37	Qualification to UEFA Cup first round

Source: www.dfb.de
Rules for classification: 1) points; 2) goal difference; 3) number of goals scored.

==== Matches ====
1	Hertha BSC	2–1	Köln	Berlin
				Attendance: Olympiastadion (Berlin), Berlin

2	Köln	2–1	Hannover 96	Müngersdorfer Stadion, Cologne

3	Eintracht Braunschweig	0–0	Köln

27 August 1975 4	Köln	1–1	1. FC Kaiserslautern	Müngersdorfer Stadion, Cologne

5	v

6 September 1975 6	Köln	1–1	Hamburger SV	Müngersdorfer Stadion, Cologne

7	Werder Bremen	v	Köln

8	Köln	3–2	MSV Duisburg

9	Bayer 05 Uerdingen	1–1	Köln

10	Köln	3–0	Rot-Weiss Essen

11	Fortuna Düsseldorf	0–0	Köln

12	Köln	1–0	Bochum

13	Schalke 04	3–1	Köln

14	Köln	3–3	Eintracht Frankfurt

15	Köln	4–0	Kickers Offenbach

16	Bayern Munich	1–2	Köln

17	Köln	0–4	Borussia Mönchengladbach

18	Köln	2–0	Hertha BSC

19	Hannover 96	3–3	Köln

20	Köln	v	Eintracht Frankfurt

21	Kaiserslautern	1–1	Köln

22	Köln	v

23	Hamburger SV	v	Köln

24	Köln	v	Werder Bremen

25	v

26	v

27	v

28	v

29	v

30	v

31	v

32	v

33	v

12 June 1976 34	Borussia Mönchengladbach	2–1	Köln	Bökelbergstadion, Mönchengladbach
15:30	Jensen 6'; Wittkamp 35'		Müller 78'	Attendance: 30,000; Referee: Heinz Aldinger
