= Anders Giske =

Norwegian footballer (born 1959)

Personal information
- Date of birth: 22 November 1959 (age 66)
- Place of birth: Kristiansund, Norway
- Position: Defender

Youth career
- Goma IL

Senior career*
Years	Team	Apps	(Gls)
1979–1981	SK Brann	57	(3)
1982	Lillestrøm SK	14	(1)
1983	SK Brann	21	(11)
1983–1984	1. FC Nürnberg	20	(1)
1984–1985	Bayer 04 Leverkusen	29	(1)
1985–1988	1. FC Nürnberg	74	(3)
1989–1992	1. FC Köln	70	(8)
1992	SK Brann	3	(0)
Total		288	(28)

International career
1979–1989	Norway	38	(0)
- * Club domestic league appearances and goals

Anders Giske (born 22 November 1959) is a retired Norwegian football player. He is the father of Madeleine Giske. He became the athletic director in Sogndal in 2005 after working in SK Brann.

== Honours ==
- DFB-Pokal finalist: 1990–91
- Bundesliga runner-up: 1989–90
