= Milivoje Novaković =

Slovenian footballer (born 1979)

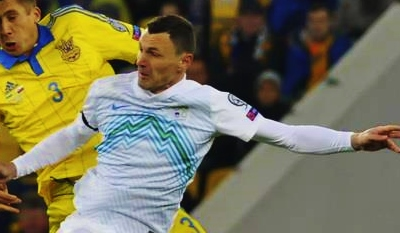
- Novaković in 2015

Personal information
- Date of birth: 18 May 1979 (age 47)
- Place of birth: Ljubljana, SR Slovenia, Yugoslavia
- Height: 1.93 m (6 ft 4 in)
- Position: Forward

Youth career
- Slovan
- –1998: Olimpija

Senior career*
Years	Team	Apps	(Gls)
1999–2000	DSG Klopeinersee	20	(9)
2000–2001	SAK Klagenfurt	16	(7)
2001–2004	ASK Voitsberg	14	(8)
2004	→ SV Mattersburg (loan)	6	(2)
2004–2005	LASK	21	(8)
2005–2006	Litex Lovech	26	(18)
2006–2014	1. FC Köln	166	(74)
2012–2013	→ Omiya Ardija (loan)	38	(17)
2014	Shimizu S-Pulse	34	(12)
2015	Nagoya Grampus	26	(5)
2016–2017	Maribor	37	(16)
Total		404	(176)

International career
2006–2017	Slovenia	80	(32)
- * Club domestic league appearances and goals

Milivoje Novaković (Slovene pronunciation: [ˈmiːliʋɔjɛ nɔˈʋaːkɔʋitʃ]; Serbian Cyrillic: Миливоје Новаковић, pronounced [noʋǎːkoʋitɕ]; born 18 May 1979) is a Slovenian retired footballer who played as a forward.

== Club career ==
Novaković spent his youth career at Olimpija where he remained until the age of 19, when he was forced to leave and look for the opportunity to play professional football elsewhere as he was written off by the club officials who considered him unpromising and too skinny for a forward. Many years later, at the height of his playing career, Novaković revealed that people at Olimpija had demanded money in order to promote him to the main squad.

He then went to play football for lower tier Austrian clubs where he rose to prominence, eventually signing with professional sides SV Mattersburg and LASK. In 2005, he signed with the Bulgarian top division side Litex Lovech and immediately established himself as one of their top players scoring 16 goals in 24 appearances during the 2005–06 season, earning the title of the league's top goalscorer. In the same season, Litex qualified for the group stage of the 2005–06 UEFA Cup, where Novaković scored two of the clubs's four goals to help the Bulgarian team reach the round of 32, where they were eliminated by France's Strasbourg with 2–0 on aggregate.

During the summer of 2006 he was linked with several different clubs (e.g. German team 1. FC Köln, Israeli team Beitar Jerusalem and Bulgarian champions Levski Sofia) but despite his wish to continue his career in a different club he started, with three goals on three league appearances, the 2006–07 season with Litex Lovech who faced Koper from Slovenia and AC Omonia from Cyprus in the qualifying rounds of the 2006–07 UEFA Cup. However, Novaković's wish to leave the club was granted in late August 2006 when he joined German side 1. FC Köln for around €1.5 million.

In his first season in Germany Novaković quickly established himself in the first team and eventually finished the season with ten goals in 25 2. Bundesliga appearances, finishing the season second on the club's top scorers list. During his second season with Köln he scored 20 goals in 33 league appearances and became the top goalscorer of the 2. Bundesliga, helping his side reach the elite Bundesliga. During the 2008–09 season, he was again Köln's top goalscorer with 16 Bundesliga goals to his name. On 12 September 2008, coach Christoph Daum made him captain of the first team squad, however in late November 2009, he lost his captaincy due to a dispute with Köln's new manager Zvonimir Soldo. The 2010–11 season was his best season in the Bundesliga as Köln finished 10th on the league table with Novaković scoring 17 goals, finishing the season on third place in the league's top scorer's list. Novaković was Köln's top scorer in three of the club's four Bundesliga seasons, during his spell at the club, scoring 44 goals in 108 appearances. After finishing the next season on 17th place Köln was relegated and during the summer of 2012 the club officials decided to cut costs of the first team before the start of the season in the second tier.

Novaković was one of the players whose contract expenses were too high and on 1 August 2012, he joined J1 League side Omiya Ardija, on loan until December 2012. After the end of the loan, Novaković returned to Cologne and stayed fit with an individual training program. On 26 January 2013, the loan was eventually renewed through 31 December 2013. In 2014 Novaković signed a two-year deal with another J League side Shimizu S Pulse. After one year, he moved to Nagoya Grampus, but he was released after only one season.

On 18 February 2016, he signed a one-and-a-half-year contract with Slovenian club Maribor.

== International career ==
Novaković was a member of the Slovenia national team between 2006 and 2017, scoring 32 goals in 80 appearances. He scored his first international goals on 31 May 2006 against Trinidad and Tobago, when he scored all three goals for Slovenia in a 3–1 win. He initially retired from international football on 13 February 2012, saying he wanted to focus on club football. However, in January 2013 he said that he is ready to play for the national team once again. On 11 October 2013, he scored a hat-trick against Norway in the 2014 FIFA World Cup qualifiers, which Slovenia won 3–0. He retired from the national team in June 2017 after the match against Malta, where he also scored Slovenia's second goal in a 2–0 win.

== Career statistics ==
=== International ===
Scores and results list Slovenia's goal tally first, score column indicates score after each Novaković goal.

List of international goals scored by Milivoje Novaković
No.	Date	Venue	Opponent	Score	Result	Competition
1	31 May 2006	Arena Petrol, Celje, Slovenia	Trinidad and Tobago	1–0	3–1	Friendly
2	31 May 2006	Arena Petrol, Celje, Slovenia	Trinidad and Tobago	2–0	3–1	Friendly
3	31 May 2006	Arena Petrol, Celje, Slovenia	Trinidad and Tobago	3–1	3–1	Friendly
4	7 October 2006	Arena Petrol, Celje, Slovenia	Luxembourg	1–0	2–0	UEFA Euro 2008 qualification
5	8 September 2007	Stade Josy Barthel, Luxembourg City, Luxembourg	Luxembourg	2–0	3–0	UEFA Euro 2008 qualification
6	6 February 2008	Nova Gorica Sports Park, Nova Gorica, Slovenia	Denmark	1–1	1–2	Friendly
7	10 September 2008	Ljudski vrt, Maribor, Slovenia	Slovakia	1–0	2–1	2010 FIFA World Cup qualification
8	10 September 2008	Ljudski vrt, Maribor, Slovenia	Slovakia	2–0	2–1	2010 FIFA World Cup qualification
9	11 October 2008	Ljudski vrt, Maribor, Slovenia	Northern Ireland	1–0	2–0	2010 FIFA World Cup qualification
10	19 November 2008	Ljudski vrt, Maribor, Slovenia	Bosnia and Herzegovina	2–4	3–4	Friendly
11	19 November 2008	Ljudski vrt, Maribor, Slovenia	Bosnia and Herzegovina	3–4	3–4	Friendly
12	9 September 2009	Ljudski vrt, Maribor, Slovenia	Poland	2–0	3–0	2010 FIFA World Cup qualification
13	14 October 2009	Stadio Olimpico, Serravalle, San Marino	San Marino	1–0	3–0	2010 FIFA World Cup qualification
14	3 March 2010	Ljudski vrt, Maribor, Slovenia	Qatar	1–0	4–1	Friendly
15	4 June 2010	Ljudski vrt, Maribor, Slovenia	New Zealand	1–0	3–1	Friendly
16	4 June 2010	Ljudski vrt, Maribor, Slovenia	New Zealand	2–1	3–1	Friendly
17	7 September 2010	Stadion Crvena Zvezda, Belgrade, Serbia	Serbia	1–0	1–1	UEFA Euro 2012 qualification
18	8 October 2010	Stožice Stadium, Ljubljana, Slovenia	Faroe Islands	4–0	5–1	UEFA Euro 2012 qualification
19	9 February 2011	Qemal Stafa Stadium, Tirana, Albania	Albania	1–0	2–1	Friendly
20	22 March 2013	Stožice Stadium, Ljubljana, Slovenia	Iceland	1–0	1–2	2014 FIFA World Cup qualification
21	31 May 2013	Schüco Arena, Bielefeld, Germany	Turkey	1–0	2–0	Friendly
22	10 September 2013	GSP Stadium, Nicosia, Cyprus	Cyprus	1–0	2–0	2014 FIFA World Cup qualification
23	11 October 2013	Ljudski vrt, Maribor, Slovenia	Norway	1–0	3–0	2014 FIFA World Cup qualification
24	11 October 2013	Ljudski vrt, Maribor, Slovenia	Norway	2–0	3–0	2014 FIFA World Cup qualification
25	11 October 2013	Ljudski vrt, Maribor, Slovenia	Norway	3–0	3–0	2014 FIFA World Cup qualification
26	9 October 2014	Ljudski vrt, Maribor, Slovenia	Switzerland	1–0	1–0	UEFA Euro 2016 qualification
27	12 October 2014	LFF Stadium, Vilnius, Lithuania	Lithuania	1–0	2–0	UEFA Euro 2016 qualification
28	12 October 2014	LFF Stadium, Vilnius, Lithuania	Lithuania	2–0	2–0	UEFA Euro 2016 qualification
29	27 March 2015	Stožice Stadium, Ljubljana, Slovenia	San Marino	4–0	6–0	UEFA Euro 2016 qualification
30	14 June 2015	Stožice Stadium, Ljubljana, Slovenia	England	1–0	2–3	UEFA Euro 2016 qualification
31	5 September 2015	St. Jakob-Park, Basel, Switzerland	Switzerland	1–0	2–3	UEFA Euro 2016 qualification
32	10 June 2017	Stožice Stadium, Ljubljana, Slovenia	Malta	2–0	2–0	2018 FIFA World Cup qualification

== Honours ==
Maribor

- Slovenian PrvaLiga: 2016–17
- Slovenian Football Cup: 2015–16

Individual

- Bulgarian A PFG top scorer: 2005–06
- 2. Bundesliga top scorer: 2007–08
- Slovenian Footballer of the Year: 2008
