= Rainer Kraft (football manager) =

German football manager

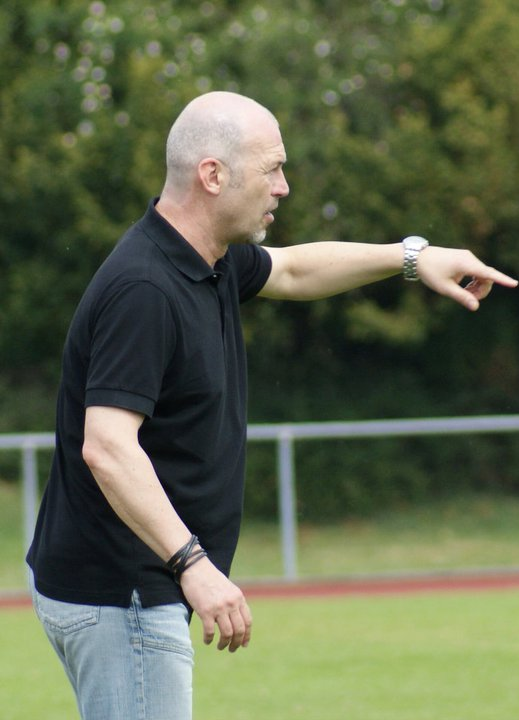

Personal information
- Full name: Rainer Kraft
- Date of birth: 30 July 1962 (age 64)
- Place of birth: Stuttgart, West Germany

Team information
- Current team: Accra Lions FC

Managerial career
- Years: Team
- 1997–2001: VfB Stuttgart (Physio)
- 2005–2008: VfR Aalen (Assistant)
- 2008–2009: Stuttgarter Kickers (Assistant)
- 2009: Stuttgarter Kickers
- 2009–2010: Esteghlal (Assistant)
- 2010–2011: VfL Kirchheim/Teck
- 2012: 1. FC Normannia Gmünd
- 2013–2015: VfR Aalen II
- 2013–2015: VfR Aalen (Academy Manager)
- 2018–2019: FC Schalke 04 (Developer international relations)
- 2019: VfL Wolfsburg (Developer international relations)
- 2019–2021: Accra Lions FC
- 2023: VfL Wolfsburg (Developer international relations)
- 2024: St. Louis City SC (assistant manager)
- 2025–Present: Accra Lions FC

Rainer Kraft (born 30 July 1962 in Stuttgart) is a German football coach who works as head coach for Accra Lions. He used to be assistant coach of Esteghlal in the Iran Pro League with fellow countryman Erich Rutemöller.
