= Uwe Harttgen =

German footballer

Personal information
- Date of birth: 6 July 1964 (age 62)
- Place of birth: Bremen, West Germany
- Height: 1.87 m (6 ft 2 in)
- Position: Midfielder

Youth career
- TSV Osterholz-Tenever
- FC Mahndorf

Senior career*
Years	Team	Apps	(Gls)
1987–1989	Werder Bremen II	65	(40)
1989–1994	Werder Bremen	77	(15)
1994–1996	Hannover 96	37	(4)
1996–2001	Werder Bremen II	144	(57)
1997–1999	Werder Bremen	5	(0)
2001–2002	FC Oberneuland	31	(1)
Total		359	(117)

Managerial career
- 2002–2007: Werder Bremen (offspring manager)
- 2007–2013: Werder Bremen (youth team coordinator)
- 2013–2014: Rot-Weiss Essen (sporting CEO)
- * Club domestic league appearances and goals

Uwe Harttgen (born 6 July 1964) is a German former professional footballer who played as a midfielder. He spent six seasons in the Bundesliga with SV Werder Bremen. After his career as an active player, he earned a PhD in psychology and became youth team coordinator for his club SV Werder Bremen.

== Career ==
=== As a player ===
Harttgen began his career as an adult footballer, unusually for a later professional, in the Kreisklasse B, where he played with friends as a recreational athlete. His first semi-professional stop was then Oberliga club FC Mahndorf, where he was discovered at the age of 23 by SV Werder Bremen for the second team, who were looking for an older leading player. Two years later, during the 1989/90 season, Harttgen was used for the first time in the Bundesliga by the Bremen club. Harttgen was able to fight his way into the regular squad in the second half of the season. He remained a regular during Bremen's great period in the early 1990s, but in the 1993/94 season he was only able to play a single game in the Bundesliga due to health issues. Harttgen moved to Hannover 96 in the 2. Bundesliga in 1994, for this club he made 37 appearances in two years and scored 4 goals. During the 1995/96 season he went back to SV Werder, where he played mainly in the second team. In 1997/98 he made five more Bundesliga appearances. In total, he made 82 appearances and scored 15 goals in the first division.

=== As a psychologist and official ===
Harttgen was initially employed as a graduate psychologist at SV Werder Bremen's youth development center before replacing the club's youth manager, Wolf Werner, in the summer of 2007. On July 5, 2007, Harttgen also succeeded Werner on the regional league committee as representative for the second teams of Bundesliga clubs.

On 14 November 2012, the DFL announced that Harttgen would also take up the post of chairman of the Performance Centers Commission there on 1 January 2013, therefore succeeding Andreas Rettig.

On 8 May 2013, Werder announced that it had parted ways with Harttgen by mutual consent due to differences of opinion regarding the future promotion of young talent.

On 9 January 2014, regional league club Rot-Weiss Essen announced the signing of Uwe Harttgen as their new sporting director from 1 February 2014.[4] However, on 24 March 2015, Harttgen was summarily dismissed after allegedly extending the contract with coach Marc Fascher, contrary to the instructions of the supervisory board.

== Other ==
In 2011, Harttgen completed a doctorate in psychology at the University of Bremen on the topic of psychological aspects of the development of youth competitive footballers.

== Honours ==
Werder Bremen

- UEFA Cup Winners' Cup: 1991–92
- Bundesliga: 1992–93
- DFB-Pokal: 1990–91, 1993–94
- DFB-Pokal finalist: 1989–90
