= 2007–08 2. Bundesliga =

34th season of the second-tier football league in Germany

2. Bundesliga
- Season: 2007–08
- Champions: Borussia Mönchengladbach
- Promoted: Borussia Mönchengladbach; TSG 1899 Hoffenheim; 1. FC Köln
- Relegated: Kickers Offenbach; Erzgebirge Aue; SC Paderborn 07; Carl Zeiss Jena
- Matches played: 306
- Goals scored: 872 (2.85 per match)
- Top goalscorer: Milivoje Novakovič (20)
- Biggest home win: Paderborn 6–0 St. Pauli
- Biggest away win: Koblenz 0–5 M'gladbach
- Highest scoring: Greuther Fürth 6–3 Osnabrück

The 2007–08 2. Bundesliga was the 34th season of the 2. Bundesliga, the second tier of Germany football league. It began on 10 August 2007 and ended on 18 May 2008.

Borussia Mönchengladbach, TSG 1899 Hoffenheim and 1. FC Köln were promoted to the Bundesliga. Kickers Offenbach, FC Erzgebirge Aue, SC Paderborn 07 and FC Carl Zeiss Jena were relegated to the new 3. Liga.

Locations of the participating teams of the 2007–08 season

== League table ==
In the previous season, 1. FSV Mainz 05, Alemannia Aachen and Borussia Mönchengladbach were relegated to this division from the Bundesliga, and SV Wehen Wiesbaden, TSG 1899 Hoffenheim, FC St. Pauli and VfL Osnabrück were promoted from the Regionalliga.

Pos	Team	Pld	W	D	L	GF	GA	GD	Pts	Promotion or relegation
1	Borussia Mönchengladbach (C, P)	34	18	12	4	71	38	+33	66	Promotion to Bundesliga
2	1899 Hoffenheim (P)	34	17	9	8	60	40	+20	60	Promotion to Bundesliga
3	1. FC Köln (P)	34	17	9	8	62	44	+18	60	Promotion to Bundesliga
4	Mainz 05	34	16	10	8	62	36	+26	58	
5	SC Freiburg	34	15	10	9	49	44	+5	55	
6	SpVgg Greuther Fürth	34	14	10	10	53	47	+6	52	
7	Alemannia Aachen	34	14	9	11	49	44	+5	51	
8	Wehen Wiesbaden	34	11	11	12	47	53	−6	44	
9	FC St. Pauli	34	11	9	14	47	53	−6	42	
10	TuS Koblenz (Note: Due to licensing irregularities TuS Koblenz were given a six points deduction.)	34	12	11	11	46	47	−1	41	
11	1860 Munich	34	9	14	11	42	45	−3	41	
12	VfL Osnabrück	34	10	10	14	43	54	−11	40	
13	1. FC Kaiserslautern	34	9	12	13	37	37	0	39	
14	FC Augsburg	34	10	8	16	39	51	−12	38	
15	Kickers Offenbach (R)	34	9	11	14	38	60	−22	38	Relegation to 3. Liga
16	Erzgebirge Aue (R)	34	7	11	16	49	57	−8	32	Relegation to 3. Liga
17	SC Paderborn (R)	34	6	13	15	33	54	−21	31	Relegation to 3. Liga
18	Carl Zeiss Jena (R)	34	6	11	17	45	68	−23	29	Relegation to 3. Liga

Source: Bundesliga.de
Rules for classification: 1) points; 2) goal difference; 3) number of goals scored.
(C) Champions; (P) Promoted; (R) Relegated

== Results ==
Home \ Away	AAC	AUE	FCA	SCF	SGF	TSG	JEN	FCK	KOB	KOE	M05	BMG	M60	KOF	OSN	SCP	STP	WEH
Alemannia Aachen	—	1–0	3–0	2–0	2–5	2–2	2–2	2–1	1–3	3–2	0–3	1–1	0–0	4–0	3–0	3–1	2–2	2–3
Erzgebirge Aue	2–1	—	3–0	2–2	1–1	2–2	5–0	0–0	0–0	3–3	3–3	2–3	1–1	3–1	0–1	6–0	0–0	3–0
FC Augsburg	1–0	1–1	—	1–1	3–0	2–2	1–1	0–0	1–0	1–3	2–1	0–2	2–6	1–1	2–0	0–1	1–0	5–1
SC Freiburg	1–0	2–0	1–0	—	3–2	3–2	2–0	1–0	4–2	1–0	1–1	1–3	2–2	0–1	1–1	1–0	2–0	0–2
Greuther Fürth	2–0	2–0	3–2	1–1	—	4–1	2–2	0–1	0–1	2–2	3–0	1–3	3–1	2–1	6–3	1–1	2–1	1–1
1899 Hoffenheim	1–2	1–0	2–0	2–0	5–0	—	5–0	1–0	3–1	0–2	1–0	4–2	0–3	2–2	3–1	1–0	1–1	2–3
Carl Zeiss Jena	2–3	2–1	1–2	1–2	1–0	0–1	—	2–2	1–2	1–3	1–2	2–2	0–2	2–0	1–1	3–0	0–1	2–2
1. FC Kaiserslautern	2–1	2–0	2–0	0–0	0–1	0–2	2–3	—	2–3	3–0	0–0	1–1	1–2	1–1	3–0	0–0	2–0	0–2
TuS Koblenz	0–0	2–2	2–1	3–2	3–0	2–2	2–0	2–2	—	1–2	1–1	0–5	3–1	1–1	1–0	0–0	1–1	2–0
1. FC Köln	0–1	3–2	3–0	1–3	0–0	3–1	4–3	2–1	1–0	—	2–0	1–1	0–0	4–1	2–0	2–1	1–1	2–1
Mainz 05	0–1	4–1	1–1	1–1	1–2	1–1	2–2	2–1	4–1	1–0	—	4–1	3–0	1–0	4–1	6–1	5–1	3–0
Borussia Mönchengladbach	2–1	2–0	4–2	2–3	3–0	0–0	2–1	1–1	1–0	2–2	0–1	—	2–2	3–0	2–1	1–1	1–0	3–0
1860 Munich	0–0	5–0	0–3	0–3	0–3	0–1	1–2	3–1	2–2	1–1	1–1	0–0	—	3–0	1–1	0–0	2–1	2–1
Kickers Offenbach	1–1	3–2	1–0	0–0	1–2	1–1	2–1	0–0	1–1	1–3	2–0	1–7	2–0	—	3–3	2–1	4–3	0–0
VfL Osnabrück	2–2	2–1	0–2	2–1	0–0	0–3	1–1	2–0	2–0	2–1	1–2	2–2	3–0	3–0	—	0–0	3–1	0–2
SC Paderborn	0–1	0–1	1–1	3–2	1–0	0–2	2–2	0–0	3–2	2–2	1–1	2–3	3–1	0–2	1–3	—	4–1	1–1
FC St. Pauli	0–2	4–2	2–0	5–0	1–1	3–1	2–2	3–4	1–0	0–2	1–0	0–3	0–0	3–1	2–1	2–1	—	1–1
Wehen Wiesbaden	3–0	3–0	2–1	2–2	1–1	0–2	5–1	0–2	0–2	4–3	1–3	1–1	0–0	2–1	1–1	1–1	1–3	—

Source: DFB
Legend: Blue = home team win; Yellow = draw; Red = away team win.

== Top scorers ==
Goals	Player	Team
20	(Slovenia) Milivoje Novakovič	1. FC Köln
18	(Canada) Rob Friend	Borussia Mönchengladbach
17	(Germany) Patrick Helmes	1. FC Köln
16	(Ecuador) Félix Borja	1. FSV Mainz 05
16	(Germany) Thomas Reichenberger	VfL Osnabrück
15	(Germany) Oliver Neuville	Borussia Mönchengladbach
12	(Nigeria) Chinedu Obasi	TSG 1899 Hoffenheim
12	(Germany) Stefan Reisinger	SpVgg Greuther Fürth
12	(Turkey) Suat Türker	Kickers Offenbach
12	(Senegal) Demba Ba	TSG 1899 Hoffenheim

== Stadia ==
Stadium	Team	Stadium	Team
Stadion am Bruchweg	1. FSV Mainz 05	Erzgebirgsstadion	FC Erzgebirge Aue
Tivoli	Alemannia Aachen	Hermann Löns Stadium	SC Paderborn 07
Borussia-Park	Borussia Mönchengladbach	Stadion Oberwerth	TuS Koblenz
Badenova-Stadion	SC Freiburg	Ernst-Abbe-Sportfeld	FC Carl Zeiss Jena
Playmobil-Stadion	SpVgg Greuther Fürth	Bieberer Berg Stadion	Kickers Offenbach
Fritz-Walter-Stadion	1. FC Kaiserslautern	Berliner Strasse Stadion	SV Wehen
Rosenaustadion	FC Augsburg	Dietmar-Hopp-Stadion	TSG 1899 Hoffenheim
Allianz Arena	TSV 1860 Munich	Millerntor-Stadion	FC St. Pauli
RheinEnergieStadion	1. FC Köln	Osnatel-Arena	VfL Osnabrück
