= FC Rot-Weiß Erfurt =

German association football club from Erfurt, Thuringia

Rot-Weiß Erfurt
- Full name: Fußballclub Rot-Weiß Erfurt e.V.
- Founded: 26 January 1966; 60 years ago
- Ground: Steigerwaldstadion
- Capacity: 18,611
- President: Lars Fuchs
- Coach: Fabian Gerber
- League: Regionalliga Nordost (IV)
- 2025–26: Regionalliga Nordost, 5th of 18
- Website: www.rot-weiss-erfurt.de
| Home colours | Away colours |

FC Rot-Weiß Erfurt is a German association football club based in Erfurt, Thuringia.

== History ==
=== Foundation to World War II ===
The club has roots that go back to a cricket club founded in 1895. As they broadened their interests they came to be called Sport Club Erfurt. The club was a founding member of the German Football Association in 1900 and in 1904 they joined the Verband Mitteldeutscher Ballspielvereine (Central German Football League). The side won the league championship in 1908–09 and advanced as far as the semi-final of the national round where they lost to the eventual champion. While Erfurt did manage to play for a number of seasons in the premier level Gauliga Mitte, formed after 1933, they failed to earn any honours.

=== Post-World War II era ===
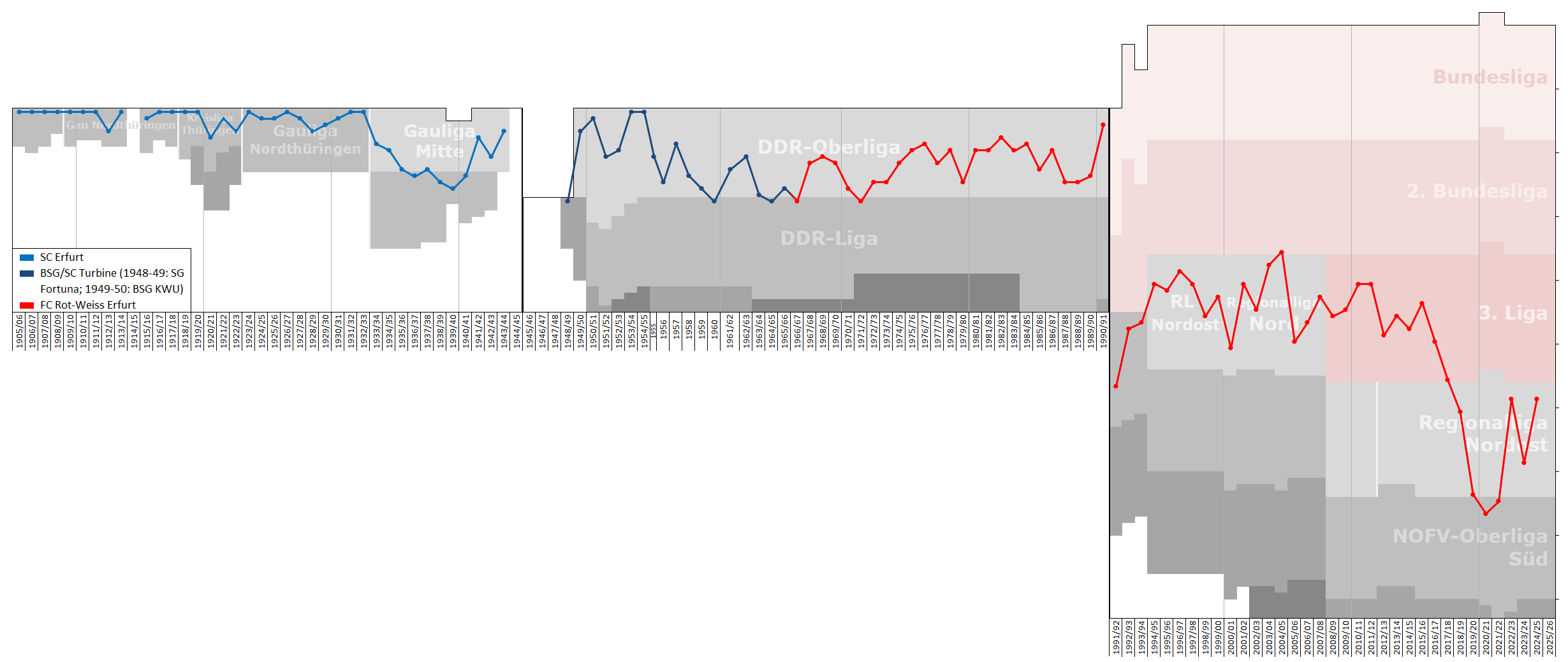
Historical chart of Rot-Weiß Erfurt league performance

In the aftermath of World War II, the Allies banned all organizations, including sport and football clubs. In 1946, the Soviet occupation authorities permitted the organization of five district sports clubs in Erfurt. SG Erfurt West encompassed the area of the city once served by SC Erfurt 1895 and VfB Erfurt and drew footballers who had played for these clubs. Success came quickly with an appearance in the 1948 Thüringer final, followed by a title in 1949. A quick series of name changes went hand-in-hand with a series of failed cup and final appearances: as SG Fortuna Erfurt in 1949, KWU Erfurt in 1950, and BSG Turbine Erfurt in 1951. In 1954 and 1955, Turbine captured consecutive East German national titles, but then slipped back into the pack and out of tier I for the first time in 1959. The team moved up and down between the first and second divisions through the 1960s, being relegated three times, but always winning immediate promotion. Like other East German clubs at the time, they suffered as the best players were routinely chosen to play for clubs with politically powerful sponsors.

=== 1960s–1980s ===
East German football underwent major changes in 1965 with the creation of dedicated football clubs in the place of broadly generalised sports clubs. The number one football sides of SC Turbine Erfurt and BSG Optima Erfurt were merged in 1966 and revived the name FC Rot-Weiß Erfurt, while the more junior sides stayed with their original clubs. The name (Rot-Weiß meaning the two colours red and white) was unusual for its time in that the club did not have a name that honoured a socialist virtue. In 1980, Rot-Weiß Erfurt appeared in the East German Cup final, losing 3–1 to Carl Zeiss Jena.

=== Reunification ===
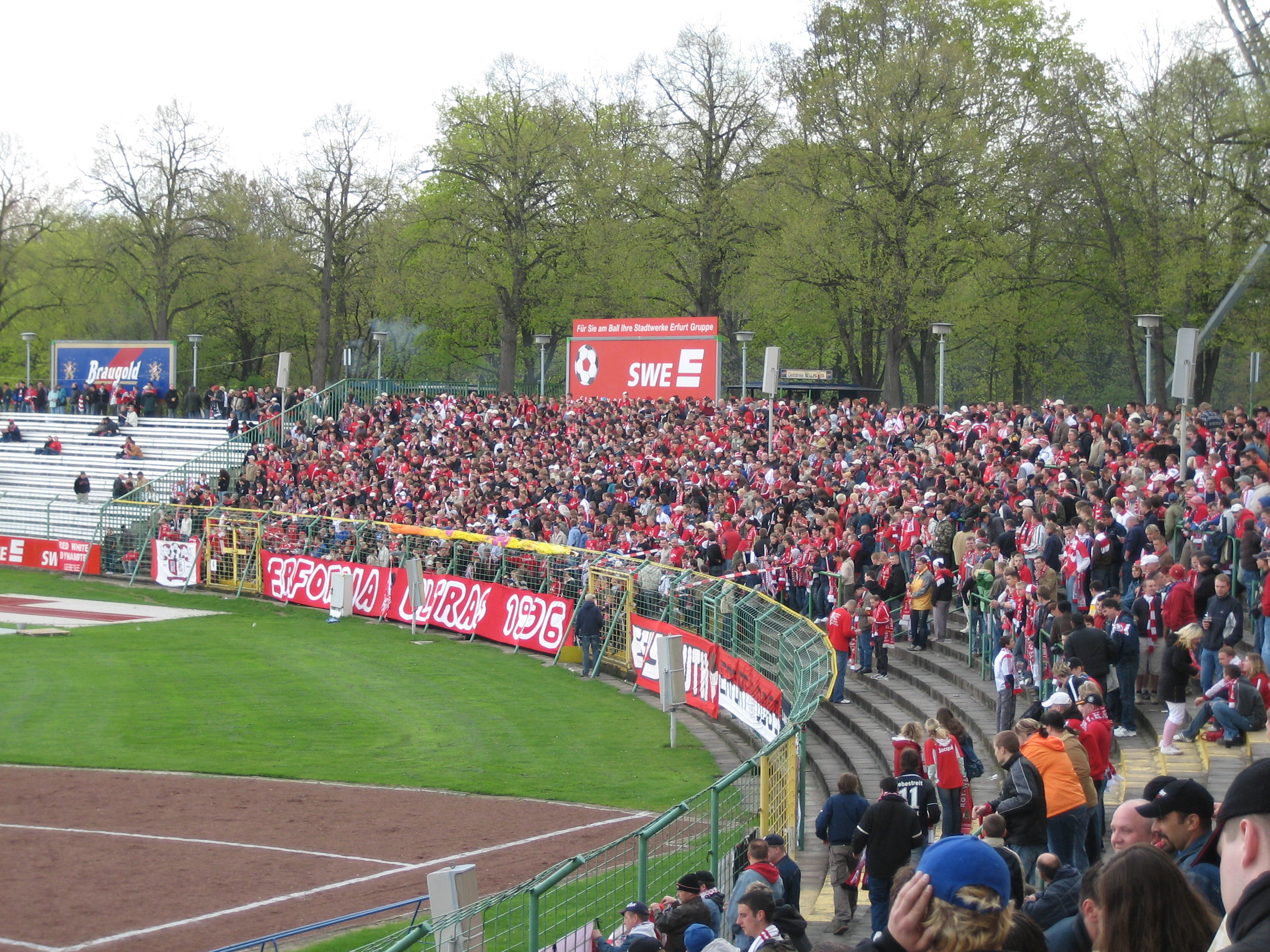
Stand 3, home of "Erfordia Ultras"

German reunification and the merger of the leagues of East and West Germany in the early 1990s brought exciting times to Rot-Weiß. A third-place finish in the NOFV-Oberliga in 1990–91 earned them a spot in the 2. Bundesliga, as well as qualification for the UEFA Cup. They eliminated Groningen in the first round, and went out against the eventual winners Ajax in the second round. This fixture made them the last side to appear internationally for East Germany.

Through the 1990s and into the new millennium, Rot-Weiß remained a tier three side. They had a close call in 2001 when they avoided relegation only because SSV Ulm 1846 was denied a licence due to financial difficulties. During this period of time, the club went through to the regional cup final seven times. They came away as Thuringian cup winner each time which qualifies for the nationwide German cup (DFB-Pokal), although they never advanced beyond the first round. In 2004, the club was promoted to the 2. Bundesliga, but finished last and was relegated back to Regionalliga Nord (III). In 2008, Erfurt finished in seventh place in Regionalliga Nord (III) and therefore qualified for the new nationwide 3. Liga. They played at this level until they were relegated to the Regionalliga Nordost (IV) in 2018.

=== Bankruptcy and reformation ===
On 4 February 2020, the club ceased operations due to financial difficulties, and as a result, withdrew from the Regionalliga Nordost, with all their results being annulled and all further matches cancelled. The club formed a new team and organisation, playing in the Oberliga in the 2020–21 season; their first home game against FC Grimma was sold out.

== Honours ==
=== League competitions ===
- DDR-Oberliga:
  - Winners: 1953–54, 1954–55
  - Runners-up: 1950–51
- Soviet Zone championship:
  - Runners-up: 1948–49

=== Cup competitions ===
- FDGB-Pokal:
  - Runners-up: 1949–50, 1979–80
- DFV-Toto-Sonderrunde (de)
  - Winners: 1974

=== Regional ===
- Verband Mitteldeutscher Ballspiel-Vereine:
  - Champions: 1908–09
- Thuringia Cup: (tiers III–VII)
  - Winners: 1993–94, 1997–98, 1999–2000, 2000–01, 2001–02, 2002–03, 2004–05^{‡}, 2007–08, 2008–09, 2016–17
  - Runners-up: 1995–96, 1996–97, 2003–04^{‡}, 2012–13, 2013–14, 2015–16
- ^{‡} Won by reserve team.

== Players ==
=== Current squad ===
As of 8 September 2026

Note: Flags indicate national team as defined under FIFA eligibility rules; some limited exceptions apply. Players may hold more than one non-FIFA nationality.

| No. | Pos. | Nation | Player |
|---|---|---|---|
| 1 | GK | GER | Lorenz Otto |
| 3 | MF | GER | Til-Linus Schwarz (captain) |
| 4 | DF | LUX | Sofiane Ikene |
| 6 | DF | GER | Maxime Awoudja |
| 7 | FW | GER | Raphael Assibey-Mensah |
| 8 | MF | GER | Benjika Caciel |
| 9 | FW | GRE | Romarjo Hajrulla |
| 10 | MF | GER | Marco Wolf |
| 11 | MF | GER | Stanislav Fehler |
| 13 | MF | GER | Berk Inaler |
| 14 | FW | GER | Benjamin Dreca |
| 16 | DF | GER | Pablo Santana Soares |
| 17 | FW | GER | Dustin Forkel |
| 18 | MF | GER | Robbie Felßberg |
| 19 | DF | ENG | Nathan Claxton |

| No. | Pos. | Nation | Player |
|---|---|---|---|
| 20 | GK | GER | Jaden Rodtnick |
| 21 | FW | RSA | Boipelo Mashigo |
| 22 | DF | GER | Niclas Walther |
| 23 | FW | GER | Philip Aboagye |
| 25 | DF | GER | Dominik Becker |
| 27 | MF | GER | Benny Boboy |
| 28 | DF | GER | Luca Kerkemeyer |
| 29 | FW | GER | Laurenz Dehl |
| 34 | MF | JPN | Hinata Gonda |
| 37 | MF | GER | Jean-Philippe Njike Nana |
| 38 | DF | ENG | Ayooluwa Adesida |
| 39 | GK | GER | Emmanuel Mensah |
| 47 | FW | GER | Mechak Quiala Tito (on loan from Fortuna Düsseldorf) |
| 55 | MF | BRA | Lucas Falcão |
| 77 | DF | UKR | Artur Andreichyk (on loan from Oleksandriya) |

=== Out on loan ===
Note: Flags indicate national team as defined under FIFA eligibility rules; some limited exceptions apply. Players may hold more than one non-FIFA nationality.

| No. / Pos. / Nation / Player; 42 / MF / GER / Raphael Jacky (at Einheit Rudolstadt until 30 June 2027) | No. / Pos. / Nation / Player; - / DF / GER / Sami Chentoufi (at Einheit Rudolstadt until 30 June 2027) |

== Managers ==
- 1964–1966: Helmut Nordhaus
- 1966–1970: Martin Schwendler
- 1970–1971: Gerhard Bäßler
- 1971–1973: Siegfried Vollrath
- 1973–1978: Gerhard Bäßler
- 1978–1982: Manfred Pfeifer
- 1982–1984: Siegmar Menz
- 1984–1987: Hans Meyer
- 1987–1988: Manfred Pfeifer
- 1988–1989: Wilfried Gröbner
- 1990–1991: Lothar Kurbjuweit
- 1991–1991: Rüdiger Schnuphase
- 1991–1992: Josip Kuže
- 1992–1995: Klaus Goldbach
- 1995–1995: Horst Kiesewetter
- 1995–1997: Frank Engel
- 1997–1997: Hans-Günter Schröder
- 1997–1997: Rudi Gores
- 1997–2000: Jürgen Raab
- 2000–2000: Frank Engel
- 2000–2001: Hans-Ulrich Thomale
- 2001–2002: Jens Große
- 2002–2003: Michael Feichtenbeiner
- 2003–2003: Alois Schwartz
- 2003–2005: René Müller
- 2005–2005: Ján Kocian
- 2005–2008: Pavel Dotchev
- 2008–2008: Heiko Nowak
- 2008–2009: Karsten Baumann
- 2009: Henri Fuchs
- 2009–2010: Rainer Hörgl
- 2010: Henri Fuchs
- 2010–2012: Stefan Emmerling
- 2012–2013: Alois Schwartz
- 2013–2015: Walter Kogler
- 2015: Christian Preußer
- 2016–2017: Stefan Krämer
- 2017: David Bergner
- 2017–2018: Stefan Emmerling
- 2018–2019: Thomas Brdarić
- 2019–2020: Robin Kruger
- 2020–2022: Goran Miscevic
- 2022–present: Fabian Gerber

== Recent seasons ==
The recent season-by-season performance of the club:

| Year | Division | Tier | Position |
|---|---|---|---|
| 1999–2000 | Regionalliga Nordost | III | 7th |
| 2000–01 | Regionalliga Süd | III | 15th |
| 2001–02 | Regionalliga Süd | III | 5th |
| 2002–03 | Regionalliga Süd | III | 9th |
| 2003–04 | Regionalliga Süd | III | 2nd ↑ |
| 2004–05 | 2. Bundesliga | II | 18th ↓ |
| 2005–06 | Regionalliga Nord | III | 14th |
| 2006–07 | Regionalliga Nord | III | 11th |
| 2007–08 | Regionalliga Nord | III | 7th |
| 2008–09 | 3. Liga | III | 10th |
| 2009–10 | 3. Liga | III | 9th |
| 2010–11 | 3. Liga | III | 5th |
| 2011–12 | 3. Liga | III | 5th |
| 2012–13 | 3. Liga | III | 13th |
| 2013–14 | 3. Liga | III | 10th |
| 2014–15 | 3. Liga | III | 12th |
| 2015–16 | 3. Liga | III | 8th |
| 2016–17 | 3. Liga | III | 14th |
| 2017–18 | 3. Liga | III | 20th ↓ |
| 2018–19 | Regionalliga Nordost | IV | 5th |
| 2019–20 | Regionalliga Nordost | IV | 18th ↓ |
| 2020–21 | NOFV-Oberliga Süd | V | Abd-3rd |
| 2021–22 | NOFV-Oberliga Süd | V | 1st ↑ |
| 2022–23 | Regionalliga Nordost | IV | 3rd |
| 2023–24 | Regionalliga Nordost | IV | 13th |
| 2024–25 | Regionalliga Nordost | IV | 3rd |
| 2025–26 | Regionalliga Nordost | IV | 5th |

- With the introduction of the Regionalligas in 1994 and the 3. Liga in 2008 as the new third tier, below the 2. Bundesliga, all leagues below dropped one tier.

Key

| ↑ Promoted | ↓ Relegated |

== Reserve team ==
The club's reserve team, FC Rot-Weiß Erfurt II, most recently in the tier five NOFV-Oberliga Süd. It first played at this level from 2005 to 2007, and again since 2008 with a third place in 2012 as its best result. At the end of the 2015–16 season the team was withdrawn from competition.

The team also made a losing appearance in the 2004 Thuringia Cup final but won the competition in the following year. This win allowed the team qualification for the 2005–06 DFB-Pokal where it lost 0–8 to Bayer 04 Leverkusen.
