= Frank Engel (football manager) =

German footballer and manager

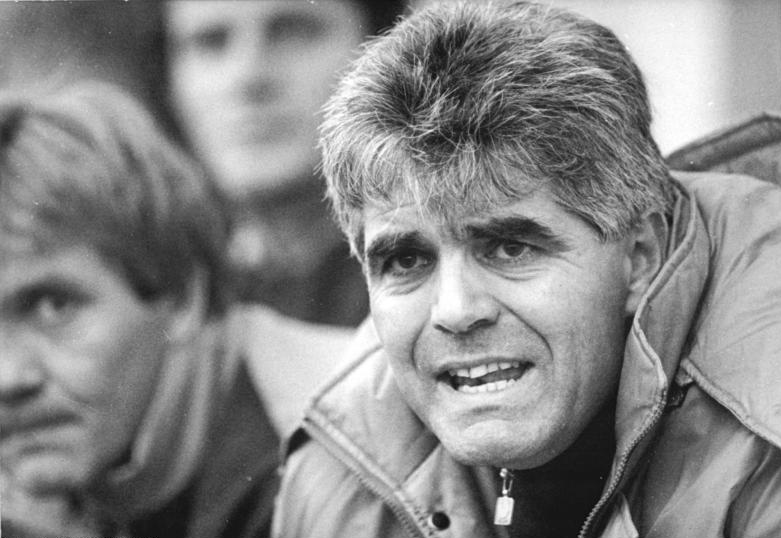
- Engel in 1990

Personal information
- Date of birth: 15 February 1951 (age 75)
- Place of birth: Leipzig, East Germany

Team information
- Current team: Germany U15 (Manager)

Youth career
- Years: Team
- BSG DIMO Böhlitz-Ehrenberg
- –1970: BSG Chemie Leipzig

Managerial career
- 1976–1988: East Germany youth teams
- 1989: BSG Chemie Böhlen
- 1990: Daewoo Royals
- 1991–1992: FC Sachsen Leipzig
- 1992–1993: TSG Markkleeberg
- 1993–1994: 1. FC Magdeburg
- 1994–1995: Union Berlin
- 1995–1997: Rot-Weiß Erfurt
- 1997: Carl Zeiss Jena
- 1998–1999: Ismaily
- 2000: Rot-Weiß Erfurt
- 2006–2009: Germany U-18
- 2009–: Germany U-15

Frank Engel (born 15 February 1951) is a German football manager who manages the Germany U15 national team. From 1 January 2006 until 2009 he managed Germany's Under-18 national team.

== Club career ==
Born in Leipzig, East Germany, Engel began his playing career at BSG DIMO Böhlitz-Ehrenberg in a suburb of Leipzig, before moving on to DDR-Oberliga side BSG Chemie Leipzig. Here he played for the youth team, but already had to end his playing days without playing a single senior game due to prolonged back problems.

== Managerial career ==
Engel took up managing immediately after his playing days had come to an end, working as a youth coach for Chemie Leipzig until 1976, when he found work with the Deutscher Fußball-Verband, the East German football association. He coached the youth national teams, U15 to U19. Altogether, he was in charge of a national team for 195 matches, and coached later stars such as Matthias Sammer, Ulf Kirsten and Thomas Doll. In 1988 his team won the bronze medal at the Under-16 European Championship in Spain. The East Germans beat their West German counterparts under Holger Osieck in the third-place playoff.

After German reunification, Engel managed a number of clubs, among the 2. Bundesliga side Carl Zeiss Jena and former East German top-flight teams 1. FC Magdeburg and Rot-Weiß Erfurt. He gained some international experience managing Daewoo Royals FC in South Korea and Ismaily SC in Egypt. In South Korea, He became a historical first foreign manager in K-League history. Additionally he was assistant manager at Eintracht Frankfurt, F.C. Hansa Rostock and Alemannia Aachen, always under Jörg Berger.

Since 2006 he has again been working with the youth national teams, first with the U18 as the successor of Michael Skibbe, then the Under-19 national team and now with the Under-15 team.
