= Frank Ordenewitz =

German footballer

Personal information
- Date of birth: 25 March 1965 (age 61)
- Place of birth: Dorfmark, West Germany
- Height: 1.80 m (5 ft 11 in)
- Position: Forward

Youth career
- 1979–1981: TSV Dorfmark
- 1981–1983: Werder Bremen

Senior career*
Years	Team	Apps	(Gls)
1983–1985	Werder Bremen (A)	61	(51)
1983–1989	Werder Bremen	125	(37)
1989–1993	1. FC Köln	126	(30)
1993–1994	JEF United Ichihara	55	(37)
1995	Hamburger SV	21	(1)
1996	Brummell Sendai	28	(20)
1997–1998	VfB Oldenburg	28	(3)
Total		426	(178)

International career
1987	West Germany	2	(0)
- * Club domestic league appearances and goals

Frank Ordenewitz (born 25 March 1965) is a German former professional footballer who played as a forward.

== Club career ==
Ordenewitz scored 68 goals in 272 Bundesliga matches.

In a league match against 1. FC Köln on 7 May 1988, the Werder Bremen player admitted to a handball in the penalty area to the referee. Köln went on to win the match 2–0. For his sportsmanship he won the FIFA Fair Play Award that season.

Three seasons later, now playing for 1. FC Köln, Ordenewitz received a yellow card against MSV Duisburg in the DFB-Pokal semi-final on 6 May 1991 (final score: 3–0 for Köln). That would have blocked him from playing in the final against his former club, Werder Bremen, and so his coach, Erich Rutemöller, advised him to get himself sent off, since this would allow him to instead serve his suspension in their next Bundesliga game. As asked, Ordenewitz intentionally knocked the ball away and was sent off. In an interview after the game, Rutemöller admitted the plan, saying: "Otze came to me, and I think you shouldn't take the chance away from him, and so I said: 'Do it!'". This request, in various modifications, later became the dictum “Mach et, Otze!”. In response, the DFB changed the rule and banned Ordenewitz from playing in the final anyway, which FC Köln went on to lose on penalties.

== International career ==
Ordenewitz was capped twice for the West Germany national team in 1987.

== Career statistics ==
=== Club ===
Appearances and goals by club, season and competition
Club	Season	League			National cup		League cup		Total	
Club	Season	Division	Apps	Goals	Apps	Goals	Apps	Goals	Apps	Goals
Werder Bremen	1983–84	Bundesliga	5	0	1	0	0	0	6	0
Werder Bremen	1984–85	Bundesliga	9	1	1	0	0	0	9	1
Werder Bremen	1985–86	Bundesliga	24	7	1	0	0	0	25	7
Werder Bremen	1986–87	Bundesliga	30	8	3	2	0	0	33	10
Werder Bremen	1987–88	Bundesliga	30	15	1	6	3	0	36	18
Werder Bremen	1988–89	Bundesliga	27	6	6	0	0	0	33	6
Werder Bremen	Total		125	37	18	5	0	0	143	42
1. FC Köln	1989–90	Bundesliga	30	3	3	1	0	0	33	4
1. FC Köln	1990–91	Bundesliga	31	7	6	3	0	0	37	10
1. FC Köln	1991–92	Bundesliga	35	11	2	0	0	0	37	11
1. FC Köln	1992–93	Bundesliga	30	9	2	2	0	0	32	11
1. FC Köln	Total		126	30	13	6	0	0	139	36
JEF United Ichihara	1993	J1 League	15	7	3	0	6	3	24	10
JEF United Ichihara	1994	J1 League	40	30	2	0	1	0	43	30
JEF United Ichihara	Total		55	37	5	0	7	3	67	40
Hamburger SV	1994–95	Bundesliga	15	0					15	0
Hamburger SV	1995–96	Bundesliga	6	1					6	1
Hamburger SV	Total		21	1	0	0	0	0	21	1
Brummell Sendai	1996	Football League	28	20	3	5	0	0	31	25
VfB Oldenburg	1997–98	Regionalliga	28	3					28	3
Career total			383	128	39	16	7	3	429	147

=== International ===
Appearances and goals by national team and year
National team	Year	Apps	Goals
West Germany	1987	2	0
Total		2	0

== Honors ==
Werder Bremen

- Bundesliga: 1987–88
- DFL-Supercup: 1988

Individual

- J-League Top Scorer: 1994 (30 goals)
- 1988 FIFA Fair Play Award

Preceded by Dundee United F.C. fans	FIFA Fair Play Award Winner; 1988	Succeeded by Trinidad and Tobago fans
