= Slobodan Topalović =

Serbian footballer

Personal information
- Date of birth: 8 November 1952
- Place of birth: Čačak, SFR Yugoslavia
- Date of death: 16 May 1994 (aged 41)
- Place of death: Belgrade, FR Yugoslavia
- Height: 1.91 m (6 ft 3 in)
- Position: Goalkeeper

Senior career*
Years	Team	Apps	(Gls)
1971–1973	Borac Čačak		
1973–1974	Galenika Zemun	33	(0)
1974–1978	1. FC Köln	17	(0)
1978–1980	Viktoria Köln	11	(0)
1980–1981	OFK Belgrade	16	(0)
1981–1987	Olympique Lyonnais	203	(0)
- * Club domestic league appearances and goals

Slobodan Topalović (8 November 1952 – 16 May 1994) was a Serbian football goalkeeper. He is considered to be one of Olympique Lyonnais best ever goalkeepers and has been named the best ever Yugoslavian to associate with the club.

His son Đorđe was also a professional footballer who played in Iran, Kazakhstan, Serbia and is now a goalkeeping coach for Emirates Club. Slobodan played in West Germany, before having a stint of two years with OFK Belgrade. He then ended his career with Olympique Lyonnais.
