= Rico Steinmann =

German footballer

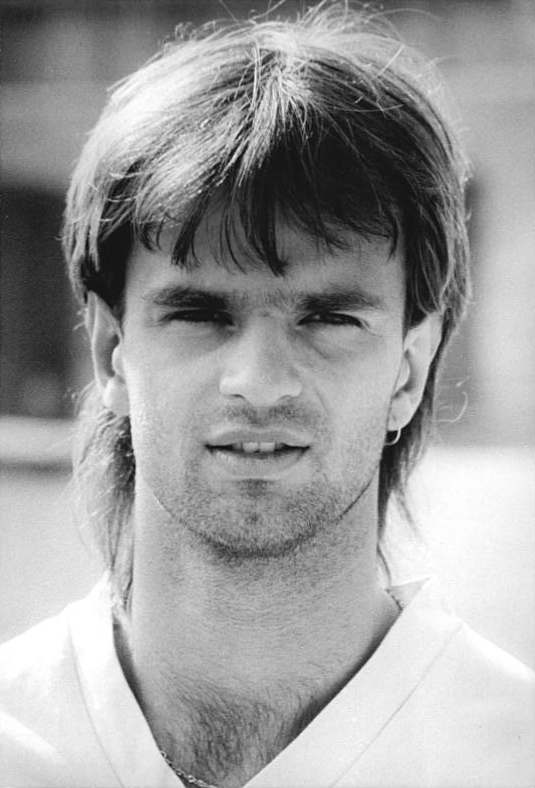
- Steinmann in 1990

Personal information
- Date of birth: 26 December 1967 (age 58)
- Place of birth: Karl-Marx-Stadt, East Germany
- Height: 1.79 m (5 ft 10 in)
- Position: Midfielder

Senior career*
| Years | Team | Apps | (Gls) |
| 1985–1991 | FC Karl-Marx-Stadt | 128 | (27) |
| 1991–1997 | 1. FC Köln | 139 | (10) |
| 1997–2000 | Twente | 46 | (4) |
| Total | | 313 | (41) |

International career
| 1986–1990 | East Germany | 23 | (3) |
- * Club domestic league appearances and goals

Rico Steinmann (born 26 December 1967 in Karl-Marx-Stadt) is a German former professional footballer who played mostly as a midfielder.

He made 23 appearances for the East Germany national team from 1986 to 1990.

Steinmann played over 300 top-flight matches in (East) Germany and the Netherlands.
