= Henrik Andersen =

Danish footballer (born 1965)

Personal information
- Full name: Henrik Andersen
- Date of birth: 7 May 1965 (age 61)
- Place of birth: Amager, Denmark
- Height: 1.85 m (6 ft 1 in)
- Position: Left-back

Youth career
- –1982: Fremad Amager

Senior career*
Years	Team	Apps	(Gls)
1982–1990	Anderlecht	171	(13)
1990–1998	1. FC Köln	125	(5)
Total		296	(18)

International career
1982–1985	Denmark U-21	7	(0)
1985–1994	Denmark	30	(2)
Medal record
Men's football
Representing Denmark
UEFA European Championship
Winner	1992 Sweden
- * Club domestic league appearances and goals

Henrik Andersen (born 7 May 1965) is a Danish former football player, who played eight years at Belgian club RSC Anderlecht as a defender, with whom he won the 1983 UEFA Cup. He played for the Danish national team in 30 matches, and scored two goals. He represented Denmark at the 1986 World Cup and the triumphant Euro 1992 tournament, where he suffered a serious knee injury, during the semi-final.

His son Kristoffer Andersen is also a retired professional footballer.

== Club career ==
Born at Amager, Andersen started his career in Fremad Amager, where he made his senior debut at the age of 16. In July 1982, he moved abroad to play for Belgian club RSC Anderlecht in the Jupiler League championship. In his first season with the club, at the age of 18, he won the international 1983 UEFA Cup tournament. In the following years, he won three Jupiler League championships and two Belgian Cups with Anderlecht.

Andersen moved on to Germany in July 1990, where he played for German Bundesliga club 1. FC Köln. He did not win anything in his time with Köln. Though the club reached the 1991 DFB-Pokal cup final, they were beaten by Werder Bremen in penalty shootout. Following his knee injury at the UEFA Euro 1992, Andersen spent 11 months in rehabilitation, before he returned for Köln in May 1993. He soon thereafter suffered another knee injury to his cruciate ligament, and was out until February 1994. Following continued injury problems, he finally became fit for the 1996–97 season where he played 28 of 34 games. After another injury, he ended his career in May 1998, 33 years old, and went on to become a sports agent in December that year.

== International career ==
Andersen made his international debut with the Danish under-16s in April 1980. He went on to play 35 youth internationals until October 1985, including seven games for the Denmark national under-21 football team.

While at Anderlecht, he received his first call-up for the senior Danish national team by national team manager Sepp Piontek. He made his debut in May 1985, and was selected to represent Denmark at the 1986 FIFA World Cup. He started the World Cup as a substitute, but played in the last three matches before Denmark were eliminated.

Andersen was once more called up to represent Denmark at an international tournament at the Euro 1992, under national manager Richard Møller Nielsen. Andersen played full-time in Denmark's three first matches at Euro 1992, but the tournament ended in tears. In the semi-final against the Netherlands, Andersen collided with Dutch striker Marco van Basten, and cracked his kneecap. He re-entered the Danish national team for a single match in August 1994, which was the last of his 30 national team matches.

== Honours ==
Anderlecht

- Belgian Pro League: 1984–85, 1985–86, 1986–87
- Belgian Cup: 1987–88, 1988–89
- UEFA Cup: 1982–83

Denmark

- 1992 European Championship
