= Karsten Baumann =

German footballer (born 1969)

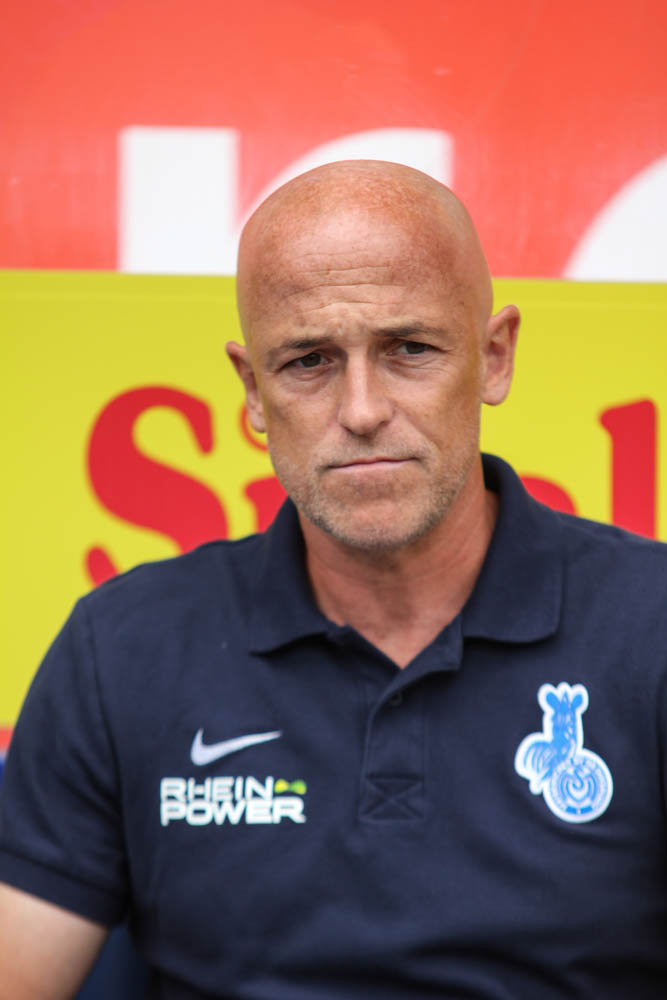
- Baumann with MSV Duisburg in 2013

Personal information
- Date of birth: 14 October 1969 (age 57)
- Place of birth: Oldenburg, West Germany
- Height: 1.83 m (6 ft 0 in)
- Position: Defender

Youth career
- Glückauf Oldenburg
- TuS Eversten

Senior career*
Years	Team	Apps	(Gls)
1987–1988	VfB Oldenburg	1	(0)
1988–1998	1. FC Köln	220	(9)
1998–2000	Borussia Dortmund	41	(0)
2001	Rot-Weiß Oberhausen	23	(2)
2002–2003	Viktoria Köln	24	(2)
2003–2005	Wuppertaler SV Borussia	62	(1)
2005–2006	SG Wattenscheid 09	17	(0)
Total		389	(14)

International career
1990	Germany Olympic	1	(0)
1992	Germany U-21	1	(0)

Managerial career
- 2008–2009: Rot-Weiß Erfurt
- 2009–2011: VfL Osnabrück
- 2012–2013: Erzgebirge Aue
- 2013–2014: MSV Duisburg
- 2014–2015: Hansa Rostock
- * Club domestic league appearances and goals

Karsten Baumann (born 14 October 1969) is a German football manager and former player who last managed Hansa Rostock.

== Playing career ==
He spent twelve years in the Bundesliga where he was mainly a player within the squad.

During his youth he played one match for the Germany national U-21 team.

== Coaching career ==
Baumann started his coaching career at Rot-Weiß Erfurt when he was hired on 19 February 2008. His first match as head coach was a 5–0 win against the reserve team of VfL Wolfsburg on 23 February 2008. He finished the 2007–08 season in seventh place and promotion to the first ever 3. Liga season. Baumann was sacked on 28 April 2009, three days after Rot-Weiß Erfurt lost to Kickers Emden 1–0.

His next job was at VfL Osnabrück when he was appointed on 12 June 2009. His first match as head coach of Osnabrück was a 1–0 loss to Eintracht Braunschweig. He was sacked on 21 March 2011 after losing 3–1 to Alemannia Aachen.

Then on 22 February 2012, Erzgebirge Aue hired Baumann as head coach after Rico Schmitt was sacked the previous day. His first match as head coach of Erzgebirge Aue was a 2–0 loss to Energie Cottbus. He was sacked on 28 April 2013. His final match was a 0–0 draw against MSV Duisburg.

He then took over the job at Duisburg on 8 July 2013. On 15 April 2014, Duisburg announced that Baumann wouldn't return for another season and had his final match on 15 May 2014 in the state cup final which Duisburg won 5–2.

On 9 December 2014, he was hired as the head coach of Hansa Rostock. He was sacked on 5 December 2015.

== Coaching record ==
As of 9 August 2015

Team	From	To	Record								
Team	From	To	G	W	D	L	GF	GA	GD	Win %	Ref.
Rot-Weiß Erfurt	19 February 2008	28 April 2009	49	18	13	18	72	66	+6	36.73	
VfL Osnabrück	12 June 2009	21 March 2011	70	30	13	27	101	97	+4	42.86	
Erzgebirge Aue	22 February 2012	28 April 2013	47	13	14	20	52	65	−13	27.66	
MSV Duisburg	8 July 2013	15 May 2014	39	13	13	13	45	46	−1	33.33	
Hansa Rostock	9 December 2014	Present	21	7	5	9	30	33	−3	33.33	
Total			226	81	58	87	300	307	−7	35.84	—
