= 1990–91 DFB-Pokal =

Tournament details
- Country: Germany
- Teams: 64

Final positions
- Champions: Werder Bremen
- Runners-up: 1. FC Köln

Tournament statistics
- Matches played: 69
- Top goal scorer: Michael Tönnies (6)

The 1990–91 DFB-Pokal was the 48th season of the annual German football cup competition. 64 teams competed in the tournament of six rounds. It began on 4 August 1990 and ended on 22 June 1991. After the semi-finals both had to be replayed after draws in the first games the final went into extra time, too. Eventually Werder Bremen defeated FC Köln 4–3 on penalties to take their second title.

== Matches ==
=== First round ===
4 August 1990
SV Waldhof Mannheim	3 – 2	VfL Bochum
Alemannia Aachen	0 – 1	KFC Uerdingen 05	(AET)
FV 09 Weinheim	1 – 0	FC Bayern Munich
Eintracht Haiger	1 – 2	Borussia Mönchengladbach
FC Kilia Kiel	1 – 4	FC St. Pauli
VfL Wolfsburg	1 – 6	1. FC Köln
Eintracht Trier	0 – 1	VfB Stuttgart
ASC Schöppingen	1 – 2	Eintracht Frankfurt
DSC Wanne-Eickel	1 – 3	Hertha BSC
SV Werder Bremen II	1 – 3	SG Wattenscheid 09
SpVgg Fürth	3 – 1	Borussia Dortmund
SpVgg Weiden	1 – 2	SV Werder Bremen
Borussia Neunkirchen	2 – 3	Fortuna Düsseldorf	(AET)
Victoria Hamburg	0 – 5	Bayer Leverkusen
Göttingen 05	0 – 4	Hamburger SV
SSV Reutlingen	3 – 6	Karlsruher SC	(AET)
SV Südwest Ludwigshafen	1 – 7	1. FC Kaiserslautern
FC Miltach	1 – 3	1. FC Nürnberg
Stuttgarter Kickers	4 – 0	SV Darmstadt 98
SpVgg Unterhaching	0 – 1	FC Schalke 04
KSV Hessen Kassel	1 – 0	FC 08 Homburg
FC Wangen	1 – 2	Rot-Weiss Essen
FSV Frankfurt	3 – 4	Preußen Münster	(AET)
Teutonia Waltrop	0 – 1	Eintracht Braunschweig
Türkiyemspor Berlin	2 – 6	1. FC Saarbrücken
SC Pfullendorf	0 – 2	MSV Duisburg
Viktoria Köln	2 – 4	VfL Osnabrück
SpVgg Bayreuth	0 – 3	Blau-Weiß 90 Berlin
SV Hilden-Nord	2 – 1	SC Freiburg	(AET)
TuS Bersenbrück	0 – 4	Hannover 96
SV Ludweiler	0 – 3	SV Meppen
FC Remscheid	3 – 2	SC Fortuna Köln	(AET)

=== Second round ===
3 November 1990
SV Werder Bremen	2 – 0	FC St. Pauli
SpVgg Fürth	0 – 1	1. FC Saarbrücken
SV Hilden-Nord	0 – 4	Preußen Münster
FC Schalke 04	4 – 0	Eintracht Braunschweig
Bayer Leverkusen	0 – 1	KFC Uerdingen 05
Eintracht Frankfurt	0 – 0	1. FC Nürnberg	(AET)
Karlsruher SC	0 – 2	VfB Stuttgart
1. FC Kaiserslautern	1 – 2	1. FC Köln
Fortuna Düsseldorf	0 – 0	Blau-Weiß 90 Berlin	(AET)
Hertha BSC	1 – 2	MSV Duisburg
Hannover 96	0 – 0	Hamburger SV	(AET)
FV 09 Weinheim	1 – 3	Rot-Weiss Essen
FC Remscheid	1 – 0	Borussia Mönchengladbach
KSV Hessen Kassel	3 – 2	Stuttgarter Kickers
SV Meppen	2 – 0	SV Waldhof Mannheim
VfL Osnabrück	1 – 2	SG Wattenscheid 09	(AET)

==== Replays ====
14 November 1990
1. FC Nürnberg	0 – 2	Eintracht Frankfurt	(AET)
Blau-Weiß 90 Berlin	1 – 0	Fortuna Düsseldorf
Hamburger SV	2 – 1	Hannover 96

=== Round of 16 ===
1 December 1990
Preußen Münster	0 – 1	VfB Stuttgart
SV Werder Bremen	3 – 1	FC Schalke 04
KFC Uerdingen 05	4 – 2	Rot-Weiss Essen	(AET)
1. FC Köln	1 – 0	SV Meppen
MSV Duisburg	3 – 2	Blau-Weiß 90 Berlin	(AET)
1. FC Saarbrücken	0 – 0	Eintracht Frankfurt	(AET)
Hamburger SV	1 – 2	SG Wattenscheid 09
FC Remscheid	2 – 3	KSV Hessen Kassel	(AET)

==== Replay ====
6 March 1991
Eintracht Frankfurt	3 – 2	1. FC Saarbrücken	(AET)

=== Quarter-finals ===
30 March 1991
KFC Uerdingen 05	1 – 4	MSV Duisburg
KSV Hessen Kassel	0 – 2	SV Werder Bremen
1. FC Köln	1 – 0	VfB Stuttgart	(AET)
31 March 1991
Eintracht Frankfurt	3 – 1	SG Wattenscheid 09

=== Semi-finals ===
24 April 1991
MSV Duisburg	0 – 0	1. FC Köln	(AET)
Eintracht Frankfurt	2 – 2	SV Werder Bremen	(AET)

==== Replays ====
2 May 1991
1. FC Köln	3 – 0	MSV Duisburg
SV Werder Bremen	6 – 3	Eintracht Frankfurt

=== Final ===
22 June 1991
19:30 CEST

Werder Bremen	1–1 (a.e.t.)	1. FC Köln
Eilts 48'	Report	Banach 62'
Penalties
Allofs (penalty missed); Rufer (penalty scored); Bratseth (penalty scored); Harttgen (penalty scored); Borowka (penalty scored)	4–3	(penalty missed) Rudy; (penalty scored) Higl; (penalty missed) Littbarski; (penalty scored) Banach; (penalty scored) Götz

Olympiastadion, Berlin
Attendance: 73,000
Referee: Aron Schmidhuber (Ottobrunn)
