= Ralf Sturm =

German footballer

Personal information
- Date of birth: 18 October 1968 (age 58)
- Place of birth: Cologne, West Germany
- Height: 1.80 m (5 ft 11 in)
- Position: Striker

Senior career*
Years	Team	Apps	(Gls)
1988–1994	1. FC Köln	121	(28)
1994–1996	Wuppertaler SV	63	(26)
1996–1997	Rot-Weiß Oberhausen	10	(1)
Total		194	(55)

International career
1989–1990	West Germany U-21	4	(0)
- * Club domestic league appearances and goals

Ralf Sturm (born 18 October 1968 in Cologne) is a German former professional footballer who played as a striker. He is the son of Hans Sturm.
