= Aron Schmidhuber =

German football referee (born 1947)

- Born: 28 February 1947 (age 79); Ottobrunn, Germany

Domestic
Years	League	Role
1980–1994	Bundesliga	Referee

International
Years	League	Role
1982–1994	FIFA-listed	Referee

Aron Schmidhuber (born 28 February 1947 in Ottobrunn) is a retired football referee from Germany. He refereed two matches in the 1990 FIFA World Cup in Italy, as well as one match at UEFA Euro 1992 in Sweden.

He also refereed the 1991 DFB-Pokal final at the Olympiastadion, Berlin, on 22 June, in which Werder Bremen defeated FC Köln 4–3 on penalties following a 1–1 draw.

== Major matches refereed ==
Date	Match	Tournament	Venue	Result	Ref
13 January 1988	Porto vs. Ajax	1987 European Super Cup final	Estádio das Antas, Porto	1–0	
16 May 1990	Fiorentina vs. Juventus	1990 UEFA Cup final (2nd leg)	Stadio Partenio, Avellino	0–0 (1–3 on aggregate)	
20 May 1992	Barcelona vs. Sampdoria	1992 European Cup final	Wembley Stadium, London	1–0 (a.e.t)	

== Honours ==
- IFFHS World's Best Referee: 1992
