= Henri Fuchs =

German footballer and manager

- Fuchs in 1990

Personal information
- Date of birth: 23 June 1970 (age 56)
- Place of birth: Greifswald, East Germany
- Height: 1.80 m (5 ft 11 in)
- Position: Striker

Team information
- Current team: Rot-Weiß Erfurt (Head of youth academy)

Youth career
- BSG KKW Greifswald
- Hansa Rostock

Senior career*
Years	Team	Apps	(Gls)
1986–1991	Hansa Rostock	60	(17)
1991–1994	1. FC Köln	62	(16)
1994–1995	Dynamo Dresden	33	(6)
1995–1996	Chemnitzer FC	18	(4)
1996–1998	VfB Leipzig	58	(13)
1998–2001	Hansa Rostock	23	(1)
2001–2004	Rot-Weiß Erfurt	55	(10)
2004–2005	TSG Neustrelitz	10	(2)
Total		319	(69)

International career
1991	Germany U-21	4	(1)

Managerial career
- 2006–2009: Rot-Weiß Erfurt U-19
- 2009: Rot-Weiß Erfurt (interim)
- 2009–2012: Rot-Weiß Erfurt (assistant)
- 2012–2013: Rot-Weiß Erfurt (assistant)
- 2015: Germania Halberstadt
- * Club domestic league appearances and goals

Henri Fuchs (born 23 June 1970) is a German football manager and former striker. He is currently the head responsible of the youth academy at FC Rot-Weiß Erfurt

== Club career ==
Fuchs played for 1. FC Köln, Chemnitzer FC, Dynamo Dresden, VfB Leipzig, Hansa Rostock and Rot-Weiß Erfurt.

== International career ==
He was a part of the East German squad at the 1989 FIFA World Youth Championship, playing all three matches.

== After retirement ==
After retiring, Fuchs became the youth head coach for his former club FC Rot-Weiß Erfurt and was named as interim head coach for Rot-Weiß Erfurt on 27 April 2009.

On 3 July 2018, Fuchs was appointed as the head responsible of the youth academy at FC Rot-Weiß Erfurt.
