= Erich Rutemöller =

German football coach (born 1945)

Personal information
- Date of birth: 8 February 1945 (age 81)
- Place of birth: Recke, Germany

Senior career*
Years	Team	Apps	(Gls)
1961–1968	SC Borussia Rheine		
1968–1970	SSV Köttingen		
1970–1973	1. FC Köln		

Managerial career
- 1975–1980: 1. FC Köln U19
- 1980–1985: 1. FC Köln II
- 1985–1989: Bonner SC
- 1990–1991: 1. FC Köln
- 1992: Hansa Rostock
- 1994–2004: Germany (assistant)
- 2003–2005: Germany U20
- 2008–2009: Iran (assistant)
- 2009: Iran (caretaker)
- 2009–2011: Esteghlal (assistant)
- 2011–2013: Philippines U23 (assistant)
- 2014–2015: Afghanistan
- 2015–2017: Afghanistan U23
- * Club domestic league appearances and goals

Erich Rutemöller (born 8 February 1945) is a German retired football manager and player.

== Coaching career ==
Rutemöller has headed 1. FC Köln, Hansa Rostock and Bonner SC during his coaching career. He was an assistant coach for the Germany national team from 1994 to 2004 and served as interim coach from 1996 to 97. He served as a motivational speaker and football coach trainer for aspiring managers attempting to receive their coaching license from the German Football Association. In 2008, he became assistant coach to head coach Ali Daei at the Iran national team.

On 28 March 2009, Rutemöller was appointed temporary head coach of the Iran national team, after Daei's dismissal. After Afshin Ghotbi became the Iranian National Team head coach, Rutemöller's coaching days for Team Melli finished.

On 27 May 2009, Rutemöller voided his contract with the Football Federation Islamic Republic of Iran and joined Esteghlal FC as first assistant to work with the newly appointed head coach Samad Marfavi on a one-year contract.

In 2011, the Philippine Football Federation appointed Rutemöller as advisor to the U23 national team. His position involved him overseeing the training and formation of the squad as they prepared for the 2011 Southeast Asian Games in Indonesia.

On 26 March 2014, Rutemöller became manager of Afghanistan national team, signing a two-year contract.

== Career statistics ==
=== Coach ===
As of 4 February 2013

Team	From	To	Competition	Record							
Team	From	To	Competition	G	W	D	L	Win %	GF	GA	GD
Bonner SC	4 August 1985	11 May 1989	League								
Bonner SC	4 August 1985	11 May 1989	Total	0	0	0	0	—			
1. FC Köln	1 July 1990	30 August 1991	League	40	13	16	11	32.50	55	52	+3
1. FC Köln	1 July 1990	30 August 1991	DFB-Pokal	8	6	2	0	75.00	18	3	+15
1. FC Köln	1 July 1990	30 August 1991	Europe	6	2	2	2	33.33	6	4	+2
1. FC Köln	1 July 1990	30 August 1991	Total	54	21	20	13	38.89	79	59	+20
Hansa Rostock	7 March 1992	31 December 1992	League	36	12	11	13	33.33	42	37	+5
Hansa Rostock	7 March 1992	31 December 1992	DFB-Pokal	2	1	1	0	50.00	4	2	+2
Hansa Rostock	7 March 1992	31 December 1992	Total	38	13	12	13	34.21	46	39	+7
Iran	28 March 2009	22 April 2009	Friendly matches	1	0	1	0	0.00	1	1	0
Iran	28 March 2009	22 April 2009	Total	1	0	1	0	0.00	1	1	0
Career totals			League	76	25	27	24	32.89	97	89	+8
Career totals			Domestic Cup	10	7	3	0	70.00	22	5	+17
Career totals			Europe	6	2	2	2	33.33	6	4	+2
Career totals			Friendly matches	1	0	1	0	0.00	1	1	0
Career totals			Total	93	34	33	26	36.56	126	99	+27
