= Alfons Higl =

German football player and manager

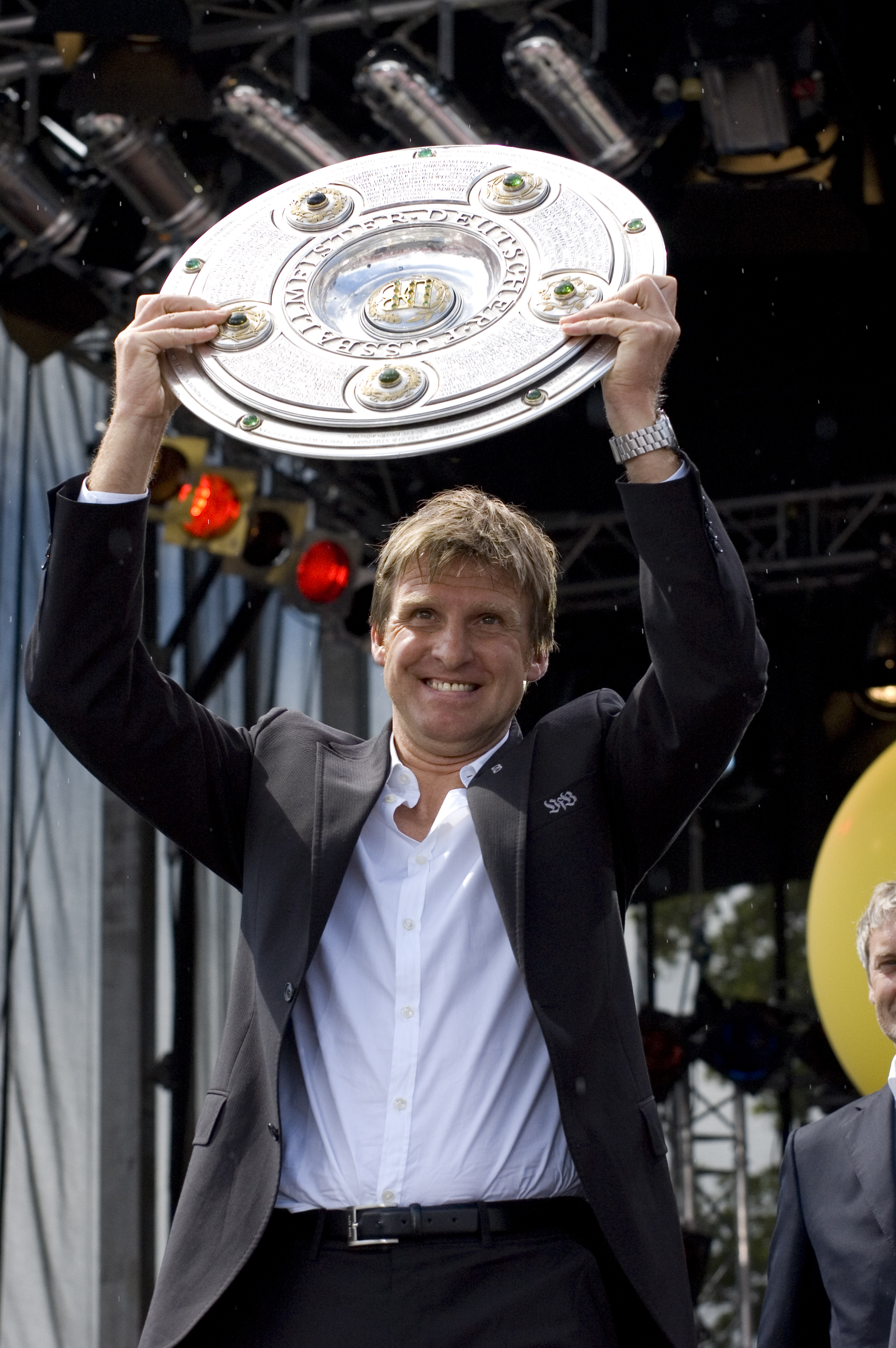
- Higl in 2007

Personal information
- Date of birth: 17 December 1964 (age 61)
- Place of birth: Aindling, West Germany
- Height: 1.83 m (6 ft 0 in)
- Position: Defender

Team information
- Current team: FC Zürich (assistant)

Youth career
- TSV Rehling

Senior career*
Years	Team	Apps	(Gls)
–1987	FC Augsburg		
1987–1989	SC Freiburg	73	(10)
1989–1995	FC Köln	172	(5)
1995–1996	Fortuna Köln	11	(0)

Managerial career
- FC Augsburg (youth)
- 1996–1999: FC Teningen
- 1998–1999: FC Augsburg
- 2000–2003: VfL Wolfsburg (assistant)
- 2004–2006: 1860 Munich II
- 2006–2008: VfB Stuttgart (assistant)
- 2009–2010: VfL Wolfsburg (assistant)
- 2011–2012: 1899 Hoffenheim U19
- 2013–2014: VfB Stuttgart (assistant)
- 2014–2017: SC Freiburg (scout)
- 2017–2018: Bahlinger SC
- 2019–: FC Zürich (assistant)
- * Club domestic league appearances and goals

Alfons Higl (born 17 December 1964 in Aindling) is a German football coach and a former player.

== Personal life ==
Higl's son Felix is a professional footballer who plays as a forward for SSV Ulm.

== Honours ==
- DFB-Pokal finalist: 1990–91
- Bundesliga runner-up: 1989–90
