= Maurice Banach =

German footballer (1967–1991)

Personal information
- Date of birth: 9 October 1967
- Place of birth: Münster, West Germany
- Date of death: 17 November 1991 (aged 24)
- Place of death: Remscheid, Germany
- Height: 1.85 m (6 ft 1 in)
- Position: Forward

Youth career
- Preußen Münster
- Borussia Dortmund

Senior career*
Years	Team	Apps	(Gls)
1986–1988	Borussia Dortmund	14	(2)
1988–1990	SG Wattenscheid 09	69	(32)
1990–1991	1. FC Köln	49	(24)
Total		132	(58)

International career
1989	West Germany U21	3	(0)
- * Club domestic league appearances and goals

Maurice "Mucki" Banach (9 October 1967 – 17 November 1991) was a German professional footballer who played as a forward.

== Career ==
Born in Münster, Banach was the son of a German seaman and an American GI. During his youth career he played for SC Preußen Münster, but he later transferred to the youth team of Borussia Dortmund, until, at seventeen, he signed his first professional contract. Until 1988 he played 14 games for Borussia, scoring two goals.

In the summer of 1988, Banach transferred to the second tier team SG Wattenscheid 09. In 1990, he was the highest scorer in the league – with 22 goals. This attracted attention from 1. FC Köln, to whom he moved in the summer of 1990, playing until the end of 1991. His last two of overall 26 Bundesliga goals came in a 4–1 victory against Fortuna Düsseldorf on 9 November 1991.

One week later, he played in his final game against Schalke 04, which his team lost 3–0.

== Death ==
The morning after this match Banach was killed in a car crash on the Autobahn near Remscheid. In the struggles after his death, the team, family and friends were supported by the "FC pastor" Heinz Baumann, who also held the funeral service.

== Honors ==
1. FC Köln

- DFB-Pokal: runner-up 1990–91
