= 2007 DFL-Ligapokal final =

German League Cup
- Event: 2007 DFL-Ligapokal
Bayern Munich	Schalke 04
1	0
- Date: 28 July 2007
- Venue: Zentralstadion, Leipzig
- Referee: Florian Meyer (Burgdorf)
- Attendance: 43,500

The 2007 DFL-Ligapokal final decided the winner of the 2007 DFL-Ligapokal, the 11th and final edition of the reiterated DFL-Ligapokal, a knockout football cup competition.

The match was played on 28 July 2007 at the Zentralstadion in Leipzig. Bayern Munich won the match 1–0 against Schalke 04 for their 6th title.

== Teams ==
In the following table, finals until 2004 were in the DFB-Ligapokal era, since 2005 were in the DFL-Ligapokal era.

Team	Qualification for tournament	Previous appearances (bold indicates winners)
Bayern Munich	2006–07 Bundesliga fourth place	6 (**1997**, **1998**, **1999**, **2000**, **2004**, 2006)
Schalke 04	2006–07 Bundesliga runners-up	3 (2001, 2002, **2005**)

== Route to the final ==
The DFL-Ligapokal was a six team single-elimination knockout cup competition. There were a total of two rounds leading up to the final. Four teams entered the preliminary round, with the two winners advancing to the semi-finals, where they were joined by two additional clubs who were given a bye. For all matches, the winner after 90 minutes advanced. If still tied, extra time, and if necessary a penalty shoot-out were used to determine the winner.

Bayern Munich		Round	Schalke 04
Opponent	Result	2007 DFL-Ligapokal	Opponent	Result
Werder Bremen	4–1	Preliminary round	Karlsruher SC	1–0
VfB Stuttgart	2–0	Semi-finals	1. FC Nürnberg	4–2

== Match ==
=== Details ===
28 July 2007
18:00 CEST

Bayern Munich	1–0	Schalke 04
Klose 29'	Report

Zentralstadion, Leipzig
Attendance: 43,500
Referee: Florian Meyer (Burgdorf)

**Bayern Munich**	**Schalke 04**

GK	1	(Germany) Oliver Kahn (c)
RB	21	(Germany) Philipp Lahm
CB	3	(Brazil) Lúcio	(yellow card) 43'
CB	6	(Argentina) Martín Demichelis
LB	23	(Germany) Marcell Jansen
CM	15	(Brazil) Zé Roberto	(yellow card) 77'
CM	16	(Germany) Andreas Ottl
RW	30	(Germany) Christian Lell		(substituted off) 75'
AM	8	(Turkey) Hamit Altıntop
LW	20	(Argentina) José Sosa
CF	18	(Germany) Miroslav Klose		(substituted off) 89'
Substitutes:
GK	22	(Germany) Michael Rensing
DF	5	(Belgium) Daniel Van Buyten
DF	28	(Germany) Stefano Celozzi
MF	14	(Paraguay) Julio dos Santos		(substituted on) 75'
FW	34	(Germany) Sandro Wagner		(substituted on) 89'
Manager:
(Germany) Ottmar Hitzfeld

GK	1	(Germany) Manuel Neuer
RB	18	(Brazil) Rafinha		(substituted off) 75'
CB	5	(Brazil) Marcelo Bordon (c)
CB	20	(Serbia) Mladen Krstajić	(yellow card) 33'
LB	24	(Germany) Christian Pander
CM	8	(Germany) Fabian Ernst
CM	3	(Georgia (country)) Levan Kobiashvili	(yellow card) 64'
AM	19	(Turkey) Halil Altıntop	(yellow card) 54'
RW	10	(Croatia) Ivan Rakitić		(substituted off) 66'
CF	22	(Germany) Kevin Kurányi
LW	11	(Denmark) Peter Løvenkrands		(substituted off) 58'
Substitutes:
GK	33	(Germany) Mathias Schober
DF	2	(Germany) Heiko Westermann		(substituted on) 75'
DF	31	(Germany) Sebastian Boenisch
MF	13	(Germany) Jermaine Jones
MF	25	(Bosnia and Herzegovina) Zlatan Bajramović
MF	26	(Germany) Mimoun Azaouagh		(substituted on) 66'
FW	14	(Germany) Gerald Asamoah	(yellow card) 72'	(substituted on) 58'
Manager:
(Germany) Mirko Slomka
