= 2000 DFB-Ligapokal final =

German League Cup
- Event: 2000 DFB-Ligapokal
Hertha BSC	Bayern Munich
1	5
- Date: 1 August 2000
- Venue: BayArena, Leverkusen
- Referee: Hellmut Krug (Gelsenkirchen)
- Attendance: 12,500

The 2000 DFB-Ligapokal final decided the winner of the 2000 DFB-Ligapokal, the 4th edition of the reiterated DFB-Ligapokal, a knockout football cup competition.

The match was played on 1 August 2000 at the BayArena in Leverkusen. Bayern Munich won the match 5–1 against Hertha BSC for their 4th title.

== Teams ==
Team	Qualification for tournament	Previous appearances (bold indicates winners)
Hertha BSC	1999–2000 Bundesliga sixth place	None
Bayern Munich^{TH}	1999–2000 Bundesliga champions and 1999–2000 DFB-Pokal winners	3 (**1997**, **1998**, **1999**)

== Route to the final ==
The DFB-Ligapokal is a six team single-elimination knockout cup competition. There are a total of two rounds leading up to the final. Four teams enter the preliminary round, with the two winners advancing to the semi-finals, where they will be joined by two additional clubs who were given a bye. For all matches, the winner after 90 minutes advances. If still tied, extra time, and if necessary penalties are used to determine the winner.

Hertha BSC		Round	Bayern Munich
Opponent	Result	2000 DFB-Ligapokal	Opponent	Result
Hamburger SV	3–1	Preliminary round	Bye
Bayer Leverkusen	1–1 (5–4 p)	Semi-finals	1. FC Kaiserslautern	4–1

== Match ==
=== Details ===
1 August 2000
20:30 CEST

Hertha BSC	1–5	Bayern Munich
Michalke 61'	Report	Zickler 50', 66', 85'; Jancker 53'; Sverrisson 57' (o.g.)

BayArena, Leverkusen
Attendance: 12,500
Referee: Hellmut Krug (Gelsenkirchen)

**Hertha BSC**	**Bayern Munich**

GK	1	(Hungary) Gábor Király
CB	33	(Germany) Marko Rehmer		(substituted off) 27'
CB	14	(Croatia) Josip Šimunić		(substituted off) 55'
CB	6	(Iceland) Eyjólfur Sverrisson
DM	18	(Hungary) Pál Dárdai
RWB	26	(Germany) Sebastian Deisler
LWB	24	(Germany) Kai Michalke	Booked
CM	22	(Germany) Stefan Beinlich		(substituted off) 72'
CM	10	(Germany) Dariusz Wosz
CF	11	(Germany) Michael Preetz (c)
CF	9	(Iran) Ali Daei
Substitutes:
GK	12	(Germany) Christian Fiedler
DF	3	(Angola) Rui Marques		(substituted on) 55'
MF	16	(Germany) Sixten Veit		(substituted on) 27'
MF	19	(Germany) Andreas Schmidt
MF	20	(United States) Tony Sanneh		(substituted on) 72'
MF	21	(Germany) Michael Hartmann
FW	29	(Poland) Piotr Reiss
Manager:
(Germany) Jürgen Röber

GK	1	(Germany) Oliver Kahn (c)
RB	20	(Bosnia and Herzegovina) Hasan Salihamidžić
CB	5	(Sweden) Patrik Andersson
CB	25	(Germany) Thomas Linke
LB	18	(Germany) Michael Tarnat		(substituted off) 78'
DM	17	(Germany) Thorsten Fink
CM	6	(Germany) Michael Wiesinger		(substituted off) 46'
CM	15	(Poland) Sławomir Wojciechowski
AM	10	(Switzerland) Ciriaco Sforza
CF	21	(Germany) Alexander Zickler
CF	24	(Paraguay) Roque Santa Cruz		(substituted off) 46'
Substitutes:
GK	33	(Germany) Stefan Wessels
DF	2	(France) Willy Sagnol
DF	4	(Ghana) Samuel Kuffour
MF	7	(Germany) Mehmet Scholl		(substituted on) 46'
MF	8	(Germany) Thomas Strunz
MF	23	(England) Owen Hargreaves	Booked	(substituted on) 78'
FW	19	(Germany) Carsten Jancker		(substituted on) 46'
Manager:
(Germany) Ottmar Hitzfeld
