= 1998–99 FC Bayern Munich season =

99th season in existence of Bayern Munich

Bayern Munich
1998–99 season
- Manager: Ottmar Hitzfeld
- Stadium: Olympic Stadium, Munich, Bavaria
- Bundesliga: Winners
- DFB-Pokal: Runners-up
- Ligapokal: Winners
- Champions League: Runners-up
- Top goalscorer: League: Carsten Jancker (13); All: Carsten Jancker (20)
Home colours	Away colours	Third colours

The 1998–99 FC Bayern Munich season was the 99th season in the club's history.

== Review and events ==
Bayern Munich played in the dramatic 1999 UEFA Champions League Final against Manchester United. Bayern Munich dominated the match, taking the lead through a Mario Basler free-kick and hitting the woodwork twice, before United substitutes Teddy Sheringham and Ole Gunnar Solskjær scored in injury time to win the treble for the English side.

== Matches ==
=== Legend ===
Win Draw Loss Postponed

=== Bundesliga ===
15 August 1998 1	VfL Wolfsburg	0–1	Bayern Munich	Wolfsburg
15:30 CEST		Report	Élber 65'	Stadium: VfL-Stadion; Attendance: 21,600 (sell-out); Referee: Georg Dardenne (Nettersheim)

22 August 1998 2	Bayern Munich	3–1	MSV Duisburg	Munich
15:30 CEST	Jancker 20'; Strunz 62'; Effenberg 86' (pen.)	Report	Wedau 23'	Stadium: Olympic Stadium; Attendance: 63,000 (sell-out); Referee: Uwe Kemmling (Kleinburgwedel)

9 September 1998 3	Bayern Munich	6–1	Hansa Rostock	Munich
20:00 CEST	Effenberg 50' (pen.); Helmer 53'; Lizarazu 56'; Zickler 72'; Jancker 73'; Élber 85'	Report	Ramdane 65'	Stadium: Olympic Stadium; Attendance: 53,000; Referee: Hellmut Krug (Gelsenkirchen)

12 September 1998 4	SC Freiburg	0–2	Bayern Munich	Freiburg
15:30 CEST		Report	Élber 21'; Strunz 35'	Stadium: Dreisamstadion; Attendance: 22,500 (sell-out); Referee: Herbert Fandel (Kyllburg)

20 September 1998 5	Bayern Munich	5–3	Hamburger SV	Munich
18:00 CEST	Daei 9', 39'; Effenberg 58', 71' (pen.); Élber 89'	Report	Yeboah 23'; Butt 69' (pen.); Groth 74'	Stadium: Olympic Stadium; Attendance: 50,000; Referee: Lutz Michael Fröhlich (Berlin)

26 September 1998 6	Werder Bremen	0–1	Bayern Munich	Bremen
15:30 CEST		Report	Élber 87'	Stadium: Weserstadion; Attendance: 36,000 (sell-out); Referee: Alfons Berg (Konz)

4 October 1998 7	Bayern Munich	2–2	Borussia Dortmund	Munich
20:00 CEST	Élber 39'; Jancker 40'	Report	Chapuisat 16'; Nerlinger 50'	Stadium: Olympic Stadium; Attendance: 61,000; Referee: Edgar Steinborn (Sinzig)

17 October 1998 8	Schalke 04	1–3	Bayern Munich	Gelsenkirchen
15:30 CEST	Eijkelkamp 20'	Report	Eigenrauch 3' (o.g.); Basler 40'; Jancker 65'	Stadium: Parkstadion; Attendance: 62,109 (sell-out); Referee: Hartmut Strampe (Handorf)

24 October 1998 9	Bayern Munich	4–0	Kaiserslautern	Munich
15:30 CEST	Basler 10'; Daei 45'; Élber 52', 55'	Report		Stadium: Olympic Stadium; Attendance: 63,000 (sell-out); Referee: Bernd Heynemann (Magdeburg)

31 October 1998 10	Eintracht Frankfurt	1–0	Bayern Munich	Frankfurt
15:30 CET	Sobotzik 32'	Report		Stadium: Waldstadion; Attendance: 58,300 (sell-out); Referee: Hans-Jürgen Weber (Essen)

7 November 1998 11	Bayern Munich	3–1	1860 Munich	Munich
15:30 CET	Jeremies 60'; Zickler 64'; Linke 87'	Report	Kientz 90'	Stadium: Olympic Stadium; Attendance: 63,000 (sell-out); Referee: Herbert Fandel (Kyllburg)

14 November 1998 13	Bayern Munich	2–0	VfB Stuttgart	Munich
15:30 CET	Effenberg 49'; Daei 90'	Report		Stadium: Olympic Stadium; Attendance: 63,000 (sell-out); Referee: Jürgen Jansen (Essen)

21 November 1998 14	Hertha BSC	1–0	Bayern Munich	Berlin
20:00 CET	Preetz 68'	Report		Stadium: Olympic Stadium; Attendance: 76,000 (sell-out); Referee: Uwe Kemmling (Kleinburgwedel)

28 November 1998 15	Bayern Munich	2–0	1. FC Nürnberg	Munich
15:30 CET	Élber 36'; Lizarazu 63'	Report		Stadium: Olympic Stadium; Attendance: 63,000 (sell-out); Referee: Georg Dardenne (Nettersheim)

4 December 1998 16	VfL Bochum	2–2	Bayern Munich	Bochum
20:00 CET	Hofmann 3'; Kuntz 87' (pen.)	Report	Jancker 45'; Strunz 88' (pen.)	Stadium: Ruhrstadion; Attendance: 33,063 (sell-out); Referee: Bernd Heynemann (Magdeburg)

13 December 1998 17	Bayern Munich	2–0	Bayer Leverkusen	Munich
18:00 CET	Tarnat 20'; Élber 30'	Report		Stadium: Olympic Stadium; Attendance: 36,000; Referee: Georg Dardenne (Nettersheim)

16 December 1998 12	Borussia Mönchengladbach	0–2	Bayern Munich	Mönchengladbach
20:00 CET		Report	Effenberg 8', 27' (pen.)	Stadium: Bökelbergstadion; Attendance: 34,500 (sell-out); Referee: Hellmut Krug (Gelsenkirchen)

19 December 1998 18	Bayern Munich	3–0	VfL Wolfsburg	Munich
15:30 CET	Jancker 40'; Élber 86'; Salihamidžić 90' (pen.)	Report		Stadium: Olympic Stadium; Attendance: 39,000; Referee: Lutz Michael Fröhlich (Berlin)

20 February 1999 19	MSV Duisburg	0–3	Bayern Munich	Duisburg
15:30 CET		Report	Jancker 26'; Effenberg 43'; Helmer 71'	Stadium: Wedaustadion; Attendance: 26,374; Referee: Edgar Steinborn (Sinzig)

27 February 1999 20	Hansa Rostock	0–4	Bayern Munich	Rostock
15:30 CET		Report	Élber 69', 87'; Jancker 79'; Matthäus 89'	Stadium: Ostseestadion; Attendance: 24,500 (sell-out); Referee: Bernhard Zerr (Ottersweier)

6 March 1999 21	Bayern Munich	2–0	SC Freiburg	Munich
15:30 CET	Schwinkendorf 30' (o.g.); Daei 79'	Report		Stadium: Olympic Stadium; Attendance: 52,000; Referee: Hans-Jürgen Weber (Essen)

13 March 1999 22	Hamburger SV	0–2	Bayern Munich	Hamburg
15:30 CET		Report	Butt 12' (o.g.); Salihamidžić 41'	Stadium: Volksparkstadion; Attendance: 28,600 (sell-out); Referee: Hellmut Krug (Gelsenkirchen)

20 March 1999 23	Bayern Munich	1–0	Werder Bremen	Munich
15:30 CET	Jancker 87'	Report		Stadium: Olympic Stadium; Attendance: 46,000; Referee: Jürgen Aust (Cologne)

3 April 1999 24	Borussia Dortmund	2–2	Bayern Munich	Dortmund
15:30 CEST	Herrlich 13', 32'	Report	Zickler 58'; Jancker 63'	Stadium: Westfalenstadion; Attendance: 68,600 (sell-out); Referee: Bernd Heynemann (Magdeburg)

10 April 1999 25	Bayern Munich	1–1	Schalke 04	Munich
15:30 CEST	Zickler 49'	Report	Held 62'	Stadium: Olympic Stadium; Attendance: 63,000 (sell-out); Referee: Alfons Berg (Konz)

13 April 1999 26	Kaiserslautern	2–1	Bayern Munich	Kaiserslautern
20:00 CEST	Buck 29'; Rische 43'	Report	Daei 43'	Stadium: Fritz-Walter-Stadion; Attendance: 41,500 (sell-out); Referee: Lutz Michael Fröhlich (Berlin)

16 April 1999 27	Bayern Munich	3–1	Eintracht Frankfurt	Munich
20:00 CEST	Bindewald 27' (o.g.); Zickler 34'; Strunz 72'	Report	Fjørtoft 80'	Stadium: Olympic Stadium; Attendance: 46,000; Referee: Jürgen Jansen (Essen)

25 April 1999 28	1860 Munich	1–1	Bayern Munich	Munich
18:00 CEST	Kurz 89'	Report	Babbel 75'	Stadium: Olympic Stadium; Attendance: 69,000 (sell-out); Referee: Uwe Kemmling (Kleinburgwedel)

1 May 1999 29	Bayern Munich	4–2	Borussia Mönchengladbach	Munich
15:30 CEST	Basler 32'; Zickler 68', 69'; Scholl 84'	Report	Polster 25' (pen.); Pettersson 54'	Stadium: Olympic Stadium; Attendance: 63,000 (sell-out); Referee: Lutz Wagner (Kriffel)

4 May 1999 30	VfB Stuttgart	0–2	Bayern Munich	Stuttgart
20:00 CEST		Report	Scholl 62'; Jancker 82'	Stadium: Gottlieb-Daimler-Stadion; Attendance: 53,000 (sell-out); Referee: Georg Dardenne (Nettersheim)

9 May 1999 31	Bayern Munich	1–1	Hertha BSC	Munich
18:00 CEST	Jancker 12'	Report	Schmidt 72'	Stadium: Olympic Stadium; Attendance: 63,000 (sell-out); Referee: Torsten Koop (Lüttenmark)

15 May 1999 32	1. FC Nürnberg	2–0	Bayern Munich	Nuremberg
15:30 CEST	Ćirić 72'; Driller 82'	Report		Stadium: Frankenstadion; Attendance: 44,400 (sell-out); Referee: Markus Merk (Otterbach)

22 May 1999 33	Bayern Munich	4–2	VfL Bochum	Munich
15:30 CEST	Basler 50'; Jancker 60'; Scholl 78'; Salihamidžić 89'	Report	Gaudino 43'; Zeyer 64'	Stadium: Olympic Stadium; Attendance: 63,000 (sell-out); Referee: Lutz Michael Fröhlich (Berlin)

29 May 1999 34	Bayer Leverkusen	1–2	Bayern Munich	Leverkusen
15:30 CEST	Kirsten 78'	Report	Basler 11'; Scholl 61'	Stadium: BayArena; Attendance: 22,500 (sell-out); Referee: Edgar Steinborn (Sinzig)

==== Results by round ====
Round	1	2	3	4	5	6	7	8	9	10	11	12	13	14	15	16	17	18	19	20	21	22	23	24	25	26	27	28	29	30	31	32	33	34
Ground	A	H	H	A	H	A	H	A	H	A	H	A	H	A	H	A	H	H	A	A	H	A	H	A	H	A	H	A	H	A	H	A	H	A
Result	W	W	W	W	W	W	D	W	W	L	W	W	W	L	W	D	W	W	W	W	W	W	W	D	D	L	W	D	W	W	D	L	W	W
Position	7	1	1	1	1	1	1	1	1	1	1	1	1	1	1	1	1	1	1	1	1	1	1	1	1	1	1	1	1	1	1	1	1	1

Source: Competitive Matches
A = Away; H = Home; W = Win; D = Draw; L = Loss

=== Ligapokal ===
3 August 1998 Semi-Final	Bayer Leverkusen	0–1	Bayern Munich	Aue
			30' Basler	Stadium: Erzgebirgsstadion; Attendance: 20.000; Referee: Bernd Heynemann

8 August 1998 Final	Bayern Munich	4–0	VfB Stuttgart	Leverkusen
	Élber 4', 25', 41'; Jancker 89'			Stadium: BayArena; Attendance: 14.000; Referee: Lutz Michael Fröhlich

=== DFB-Pokal ===
30 August 1998 1st Round	LR Ahlen	0–5	Bayern Munich	Ahlen
15:00 CEST		Report	Effenberg 22' (pen.), 37'; Jancker 34'; Helmer 44'; Fink 73'	Stadium: Wersestadion; Attendance: 12,026 (sell-out); Referee: Jürgen Aust (Cologne)

23 September 1998 2nd Round	Greuther Fürth	0–0 (a.e.t.) (3–4 p)	Bayern Munich	Nuremberg
19:30 CEST		Report		Stadium: Frankenstadion; Attendance: 31,000 (sell-out); Referee: Jürgen Jansen (Essen)
	Penalties
	van Lent (penalty scored); Probst (penalty scored); Felgenhauer (penalty missed); Eberl (penalty scored); Škarabela (penalty missed)		Strunz (penalty scored); Salihamidžić (penalty scored); Tarnat (penalty scored); Fink (penalty missed); Effenberg (penalty scored)

28 October 1998 3rd Round	MSV Duisburg	2–4	Bayern Munich	Duisburg
20:30 CET	Beierle 37', 50'	Report	Élber 56', 60'; Jeremies 76'; Lizarazu 89'	Stadium: Wedaustadion; Attendance: 23,000 (sell-out); Referee: Bernhard Zerr (Ottersweier)

21 December 1998 Quarter-final	Bayern Munich	3–0	VfB Stuttgart	Munich
19:30 CET	Jancker 26'; Basler 71'; Zickler 78'	Report		Stadium: Olympic Stadium; Attendance: 11,000; Referee: Hartmut Strampe (Handorf)

9 March 1999 Semi-final	Rot-Weiß Oberhausen	1–3	Bayern Munich	Gelsenkirchen
19:00 CET	Scheinhardt 85' (pen.)	Report	Jancker 24'; Effenberg 42'; Linke 79'	Stadium: Parkstadion; Attendance: 47,300; Referee: Herbert Fandel (Kyllburg)

12 June 1999 Final	Bayern Munich	1–1 (a.e.t.) (4–5 p)	Werder Bremen	Berlin
19:30 CEST	Jancker 45'	Report	Maksymov 4'	Stadium: Olympic Stadium; Attendance: 75,841 (sell-out); Referee: Jürgen Aust (Cologne)
	Penalties
	Salihamidžić (penalty scored); Daei (penalty scored); Tarnat (penalty scored); Jancker (penalty scored); Effenberg (penalty missed); Matthäus (penalty missed)		Bode (penalty scored); Todt (penalty missed); Bogdanović (penalty scored); Wicky (penalty scored); Eilts (penalty scored); Rost (penalty scored)

=== UEFA Champions League ===
==== Second qualifying round ====
12 August 1998 1	Bayern Munich (Germany)	4–0	(Federal Republic of Yugoslavia) FK Obilić	Munich, Germany
	Effenberg 59'; Élber 63'; Zickler 65'; Fink 76'			Stadium: Olympiastadion; Attendance: 37,000; Referee: Terje Hauge (Norway)

26 August 1998 2	FK Obilić (Federal Republic of Yugoslavia)	1–1 (1–5 agg.)	(Germany) Bayern Munich	Belgrade, Yugoslavia
	Šarac 68'		Matthäus 89'	Stadium: Partizan Stadium; Attendance: 8,500; Referee: Antonio Lopez Nieto (Spain)

==== Group stage ====
16 September 1998 1	Brøndby IF (Denmark)	2–1	(Germany) Bayern Munich	Brøndby, Denmark
	Helmer 87' (o.g.); Jensen 90'	Report	Babbel 77'	Stadium: Brøndby Stadium; Attendance: 30,378; Referee: László Vagner (Hungary)

30 September 1998 2	Bayern Munich (Germany)	2–2	(England) Manchester United	Munich, Germany
20:45 CEST	Élber 11'; Sheringham 90' (o.g.)	Report	Yorke 30'; Scholes 49'	Stadium: Olympiastadion; Attendance: 55,000; Referee: Marc Batta (France)

21 October 1998 3	Bayern Munich (Germany)	1–0	(Spain) Barcelona	Munich, Germany
20:45 CEST	Effenberg 45'	Report		Stadium: Olympiastadion; Attendance: 56,000; Referee: Anders Frisk (Sweden)

4 November 1998 4	Barcelona (Spain)	1–2	(Germany) Bayern Munich	Barcelona, Spain
20:45 CET	Giovanni 29' (pen.)	Report	Zickler 47'; Salihamidžić 87'	Stadium: Camp Nou; Attendance: 85,000; Referee: Pierluigi Collina (Italy)

25 November 1998 5	Bayern Munich (Germany)	2–0	(Denmark) Brøndby	Munich, Germany
20:45 CET	Jancker 51'; Basler 57'	Report		Stadium: Olympiastadion; Attendance: 34,000; Referee: Ogüz Sarvan (Turkey)

9 December 1998 6	Manchester United (England)	1–1	(Germany) Bayern Munich	Manchester, England
20:45 CET	Keane 43'	Report	Salihamidžić 56'	Stadium: Old Trafford; Attendance: 54,434; Referee: Dick Jol (Netherlands)

==== Knockout rounds ====
===== Quarter-finals =====
3 March 1999 1	Bayern Munich (Germany)	2–0	(Germany) 1. FC Kaiserslautern	Munich, Germany
20:45 CET	Élber 31'; Effenberg 35'	Report		Stadium: Olympiastadion; Attendance: 54,000; Referee: Nikolai Levnikov (Russia)

17 March 1999 2	1. FC Kaiserslautern (Germany)	0–4 (0–6 agg.)	(Germany) Bayern Munich	Kaiserslautern, Germany
20:45 CET		Report	Effenberg 9' (pen.); Jancker 22'; Rösler 39' (o.g.); Basler 56'	Stadium: Fritz-Walter-Stadion; Attendance: 31,500; Referee: Urs Meier (Switzerland)

===== Semi-finals =====
7 April 1999 1	Dynamo Kyiv (Ukraine)	3–3	(Germany) Bayern Munich	Kyiv, Ukraine
20:45 CEST	Shevcheko 15', 43'; Kosovskyi 50'	Report	Tarnat 45'; Effenberg 78'; Jancker 89'	Stadium: Olimpiyskiy; Attendance: 75.000; Referee: Kim Milton Nielson (Denmark)

17 April 1999 2	Bayern Munich (Germany)	1–0 (4–3 agg.)	(Ukraine) Dynamo Kyiv	Munich, Germany
20:45 CEST	Basler 35'	Report		Stadium: Olympiastadion; Attendance: 60,000; Referee: Vítor Melo Pereira (Portugal)

===== Final =====
26 May 1999	Bayern Munich (Germany)	1–2	(England) Manchester United	Barcelona, Spain
20:45 CEST	Basler 6'	Report	Sheringham 90+1'; Solskjær 90+3'	Stadium: Camp Nou; Attendance: 90,245; Referee: Pierluigi Collina (Italy)

== Squad ==
=== Squad, appearances and goals ===
No.	Pos	Nat	Player	Total		Bundesliga		Champions League		DFB-Pokal	
No.	Pos	Nat	Player	Apps	Goals	Apps	Goals	Apps	Goals	Apps	Goals
1	GK	(Germany) GER	Oliver Kahn	49	0	30	0	13	0	6	0
22	GK	(Germany) GER	Bernd Dreher	4	0	4	0	0	0	0	0
12	GK	(Germany) GER	Sven Scheuer	3	0	3	0	0	0	0	0
2	DF	(Germany) GER	Markus Babbel	44	2	27	1	12	1	5	0
10	DF	(Germany) GER	Lothar Matthäus	42	2	25	1	12	1	5	0
25	DF	(Germany) GER	Thomas Linke	41	2	27	1	9	0	5	1
3	DF	(France) FRA	Bixente Lizarazu	33	3	19	2	9	0	5	1
18	DF	(Germany) GER	Michael Tarnat	32	2	20	1	9	1	3	0
5	DF	(Germany) GER	Thomas Helmer (captain)	26	3	21	2	2	0	3	1
4	DF	(Ghana) GHA	Samuel Kuffour	26	0	15	0	8	0	3	0
30	DF	(Sweden) SWE	Nils-Eric Johansson	2	0	2	0	0	0	0	0
11	MF	(Germany) GER	Stefan Effenberg	49	16	31	8	12	5	6	3
20	MF	(Bosnia and Herzegovina) BIH	Hasan Salihamidžić	47	5	30	3	13	2	4	0
13	MF	(Germany) GER	Jens Jeremies	47	2	30	1	11	0	6	1
17	MF	(Germany) GER	Thorsten Fink	42	2	28	0	10	1	4	1
8	MF	(Germany) GER	Thomas Strunz	37	4	24	4	9	0	4	0
7	MF	(Germany) GER	Mehmet Scholl	18	4	13	4	3	0	2	0
31	MF	(Czech Republic) CZE	David Jarolím	1	0	1	0	0	0	0	0
19	FW	(Germany) GER	Carsten Jancker	44	20	26	13	12	3	6	4
21	FW	(Germany) GER	Alexander Zickler	42	10	26	7	12	2	4	1
14	FW	(Germany) GER	Mario Basler	41	10	27	5	10	4	4	1
9	FW	(Brazil) BRA	Giovane Élber	35	18	21	13	9	3	5	2
24	FW	(Iran) IRI	Ali Daei	32	6	23	6	5	0	4	0
Players sold or loaned out after the start of the season:
15	FW	(Germany) GER	Alexander Bugera	2	0	2	0	0	0	0	0
28	FW	(Turkey) TUR	Berkant Göktan	2	0	1	0	1	0	0	0

=== Goals ===
Pos.	Player	BL	CL	Cup	Overall
1	(Germany) Carsten Jancker	13	3	4	20
2	(Brazil) Giovane Élber	13	3	2	18
3	(Germany) Stefan Effenberg	8	5	3	16
4	(Germany) Alexander Zickler	7	2	1	10
4	(Germany) Mario Basler	5	4	1	10

=== Bookings ===
N	Pos.	Nat.	Name	Yellow card	Second yellow card	Red card	Notes
1	GK	(Germany)	Oliver Kahn	3	1		
2	DF	(Germany)	Markus Babbel	12			
10	DF	(Germany)	Lothar Matthäus	10			
3	DF	(France)	Bixente Lizarazu	7			
18	DF	(Germany)	Michael Tarnat	6			
4	DF	(Ghana)	Samuel Kuffour	3		1	
5	DF	(Germany)	Thomas Helmer	3			
25	DF	(Germany)	Thomas Linke	3			
11	MF	(Germany)	Stefan Effenberg	14			
8	MF	(Germany)	Thomas Strunz	10			
13	MF	(Germany)	Jens Jeremies	8			
17	MF	(Germany)	Thorsten Fink	5			
20	MF	(Bosnia and Herzegovina)	Hasan Salihamidžić	4			
7	MF	(Germany)	Mehmet Scholl	1			
14	FW	(Germany)	Mario Basler	8	1		
9	FW	(Brazil)	Giovane Élber	9			
19	FW	(Germany)	Carsten Jancker	5	1		
21	FW	(Germany)	Alexander Zickler	2			
24	FW	(Iran)	Ali Daei	1			

Source: Kicker
Only competitive matches
(yellow card) = Number of bookings; (second yellow card) = Number of sending offs after a second yellow card; (red card) = Number of sending offs by a direct red card.

=== Transfers and loans ===
==== Transfers in ====
No.	Pos.	Nat.	Name	Age	EU	Moving from	Type	Transfer window	Ends	Transfer fee	Source
20	MF	(Bosnia and Herzegovina)	Hasan Salihamidžić	21	EU	Hamburger SV	Transfer	Summer		Free	
25	DF	(Germany)	Thomas Linke	28	EU	Schalke 04	Transfer	Summer		Free	
13	MF	(Germany)	Jens Jeremies	23	EU	1860 Munich	Transfer	Summer		€800,000	
11	MF	(Germany)	Stefan Effenberg	29	EU	Borussia Mönchengladbach	Transfer	Summer		€4,250,000	
24	FW	(Iran)	Ali Daei	29	Non-EU	Arminia Bielefeld	Transfer	Summer		€2,550,000	

Total spending: ▼€7,600,000

==== Transfers out ====
No.	Pos.	Nat.	Name	Age	EU	Moving to	Type	Transfer window	Transfer fee	Source
6	MF	(Germany)	Christian Nerlinger	25	EU	Borussia Dortmund	Transfer	Summer	Free	
24	MF	(Germany)	Stefan Leitl	20	EU	SV Lohhof	Transfer	Summer	Free	
20	FW	(Italy)	Ruggiero Rizzitelli	30	EU	Piacenza (Italy)	Transfer	Summer	Free	
3	DF	(Germany)	Markus Münch	25	EU	Genoa (Italy)	Transfer	Summer	€870,000	
23	MF	(Germany)	Frank Gerster	22	EU	Eintracht Frankfurt	Transfer	Summer	€80,000	
16	MF	(Germany)	Dietmar Hamann	24	EU	Newcastle United (England)	Transfer	Summer	€7,500,000	
28	FW	(Turkey)	Berkant Göktan	18	EU	Borussia Mönchengladbach	Loan	Winter	Free	
15	FW	(Germany)	Alexander Bugera	20	EU	MSV Duisburg	Loan	Winter	€125,000	
29	DF	(Ghana)	Christian Saba	20	Non-EU	MSV Duisburg	Loan	Winter	€100,000	

Total income: ▲€8,675,000

== Team Kit ==
Home	Away	Away alt.	Third
