= 2006 DFL-Ligapokal final =

German League Cup
- Event: 2006 DFL-Ligapokal
Werder Bremen	Bayern Munich
2	0
- Date: 5 August 2006
- Venue: Zentralstadion, Leipzig
- Referee: Manuel Gräfe (Berlin)
- Attendance: 41,300

The 2006 DFL-Ligapokal final decided the winner of the 2006 DFL-Ligapokal, the 10th edition of the reiterated DFL-Ligapokal, a knockout football cup competition.

The match was played on 5 August 2006 at the Zentralstadion in Leipzig. Werder Bremen won the match 2–0 against Bayern Munich for their 1st title.

== Teams ==
In the following table, finals until 2004 were in the DFB-Ligapokal era, since 2005 were in the DFL-Ligapokal era.

Team	Qualification for tournament	Previous appearances (bold indicates winners)
Werder Bremen	2005–06 Bundesliga runners-up	2 (1999, 2004)
Bayern Munich	2005–06 Bundesliga champions and 2005–06 DFB-Pokal winners	5 (**1997**, **1998**, **1999**, **2000**, **2004**)

== Route to the final ==
The DFL-Ligapokal is a six team single-elimination knockout cup competition. There are a total of two rounds leading up to the final. Four teams enter the preliminary round, with the two winners advancing to the semi-finals, where they will be joined by two additional clubs who were given a bye. For all matches, the winner after 90 minutes advances. If still tied, extra time, and if necessary penalties are used to determine the winner.

Werder Bremen		Round	Bayern Munich
Opponent	Result	2006 DFL-Ligapokal	Opponent	Result
Hamburger SV	2–1	Semi-finals	Schalke 04	0–0 (4–1 p)

== Match ==
=== Details ===
5 August 2006
18:00 CEST

Werder Bremen	2–0	Bayern Munich
Klasnić 29', 66'	Report

Zentralstadion, Leipzig
Attendance: 41,300
Referee: Manuel Gräfe (Berlin)

**Werder Bremen**	**Bayern Munich**

GK	18	(Germany) Tim Wiese
RB	15	(Germany) (Nigeria) Patrick Owomoyela
CB	2	(Germany) Frank Fahrenhorst
CB	4	(Brazil) Naldo
LB	5	(Cameroon) Pierre Womé
DM	22	(Germany) Torsten Frings (c)
CM	20	(Denmark) Daniel Jensen		(substituted off) 77'
CM	27	(Germany) Christian Schulz		(substituted off) 81'
AM	10	(Brazil) (Italy) Diego	Booked
CF	17	(Croatia) Ivan Klasnić
CF	11	(Germany) Miroslav Klose		(substituted off) 60'
Substitutes:
GK	33	(Germany) Christian Vander
DF	8	(Germany) Clemens Fritz
DF	16	(Denmark) Leon Andreasen		(substituted on) 77'
MF	6	(Germany) Frank Baumann
MF	7	(Croatia) Jurica Vranješ		(substituted on) 81'
MF	14	(Germany) Aaron Hunt		(substituted on) 60'
FW	9	(Egypt) Mohamed Zidan
Manager:
(Germany) Thomas Schaaf

GK	1	(Germany) Oliver Kahn (c)
RB	2	(France) Willy Sagnol
CB	3	(Brazil) Lúcio
CB	5	(Belgium) Daniel Van Buyten
LB	21	(Germany) Philipp Lahm	(substituted off) 46'
DM	23	(England) Owen Hargreaves
CM	8	(Iran) Ali Karimi
CM	31	(Germany) Bastian Schweinsteiger	(substituted off) 46'
AM	24	(Paraguay) Roque Santa Cruz
CF	10	(Netherlands) Roy Makaay
CF	11	(Germany) (Poland) Lukas Podolski	(substituted off) 46'
Substitutes:
GK	29	(Germany) Bernd Dreher
DF	32	(Germany) Mats Hummels
MF	7	(Germany) (Turkey) Mehmet Scholl
MF	19	(Paraguay) Julio dos Santos	(substituted on) 46'
MF	20	(Bosnia and Herzegovina) Hasan Salihamidžić	(substituted on) 46'
MF	39	(Germany) Andreas Ottl	(substituted on) 46'
Manager:
(Germany) Felix Magath
