= 1999 DFB-Ligapokal final =

German League Cup
- Event: 1999 DFB-Ligapokal
Werder Bremen	Bayern Munich
1	2
- Date: 17 July 1999
- Venue: BayArena, Leverkusen
- Referee: Hans-Jürgen Weber (Essen)
- Attendance: 13,000

The 1999 DFB-Ligapokal final decided the winner of the 1999 DFB-Ligapokal, the 3rd edition of the reiterated DFB-Ligapokal, a knockout football cup competition.

The match was played on 17 July 1999 at the BayArena in Leverkusen. Bayern Munich won the match 2–1 against Werder Bremen for their 3rd title.

== Teams ==
Team	Qualification for tournament	Previous appearances (bold indicates winners)
Werder Bremen	1998–99 DFB-Pokal winners	None
Bayern Munich^{TH}	1998–99 Bundesliga champions	2 (**1997**, **1998**)

== Route to the final ==
The DFB-Ligapokal is a six team single-elimination knockout cup competition. There are a total of two rounds leading up to the final. Four teams enter the preliminary round, with the two winners advancing to the semi-finals, where they will be joined by two additional clubs who were given a bye. For all matches, the winner after 90 minutes advances. If still tied, extra time, and if necessary penalties are used to determine the winner.

Werder Bremen		Round	Bayern Munich
Opponent	Result	1999 DFB-Ligapokal	Opponent	Result
Bayer Leverkusen	2–1	Semi-finals	Borussia Dortmund	1–0

== Match ==
=== Details ===
17 July 1999
17:45 CEST

Werder Bremen	1–2	Bayern Munich
Seidel 56'	Report	Paulo Sérgio 37'; Tarnat 43'

BayArena, Leverkusen
Attendance: 13,000
Referee: Hans-Jürgen Weber (Essen)

**Werder Bremen**	**Bayern Munich**

GK	1	(Germany) Frank Rost
RB	4	(Germany) Dirk Flock
CB	24	(Germany) Sven Benken
CB	6	(Germany) Frank Baumann
LB	13	(Germany) Andree Wiedener
RM	22	(Germany) Torsten Frings		(substituted off) 60'
CM	5	(Germany) Dieter Eilts (c)		(substituted off) 60'
CM	3	(Switzerland) Raphaël Wicky	Booked
LM	7	(Ukraine) Yuriy Maksymov
CF	25	(Germany) Sören Seidel
CF	32	(Brazil) Aílton		(substituted off) 75'
Substitutes:
GK	12	(Germany) Stefan Brasas
DF	33	(Germany) Mike Barten
MF	2	(Netherlands) Lodewijk Roembiak
MF	23	(Germany) Christoph Dabrowski		(substituted on) 60'
FW	9	(Federal Republic of Yugoslavia) Rade Bogdanović		(substituted on) 60'
FW	11	(Switzerland) Adrian Kunz		(substituted on) 75'
FW	20	(Germany) Dirk Weetendorf
Manager:
(Germany) Thomas Schaaf

GK	22	(Germany) Bernd Dreher
CB	5	(Sweden) Patrik Andersson
CB	25	(Germany) Thomas Linke	Booked
DM	10	(Germany) Lothar Matthäus (c)		(substituted off) 79'
RWB	2	(Germany) Markus Babbel
LWB	18	(Germany) Michael Tarnat
CM	7	(Germany) Mehmet Scholl
CM	17	(Germany) Thorsten Fink
RW	21	(Germany) Alexander Zickler		(substituted off) 77'
LW	13	(Brazil) Paulo Sérgio
CF	19	(Germany) Carsten Jancker
Substitutes:
GK	33	(Germany) Stefan Wessels
DF	23	(Germany) Frank Wiblishauser
DF	29	(Germany) Sebastian Backer
MF	6	(Germany) Michael Wiesinger
MF	20	(Bosnia and Herzegovina) Hasan Salihamidžić	Booked	(substituted on) 77'
MF	31	(Czech Republic) David Jarolím		(substituted on) 79'
FW	32	(Ghana) Emanuel Bentil
Manager:
(Germany) Ottmar Hitzfeld
