= 2004 DFB-Ligapokal final =

German League Cup
- Event: 2004 DFB-Ligapokal
Bayern Munich	Werder Bremen
3	2
- Date: 2 August 2004
- Venue: Bruchwegstadion, Mainz
- Referee: Lutz Michael Fröhlich (Berlin)
- Attendance: 13,000

The 2004 DFB-Ligapokal final decided the winner of the 2004 DFB-Ligapokal, the 8th edition of the reiterated DFB-Ligapokal, a knockout football cup competition.

The match was played on 2 August 2004 at the Bruchwegstadion in Mainz. Bayern Munich won the match 3–2 against Werder Bremen for their 5th title.

== Teams ==
Team	Qualification for tournament	Previous appearances (bold indicates winners)
Bayern Munich	2003–04 Bundesliga runners-up	4 (**1997**, **1998**, **1999**, **2000**)
Werder Bremen	2003–04 Bundesliga champions and 2003–04 DFB-Pokal winners	1 (1999)

== Route to the final ==
The DFB-Ligapokal is a six team single-elimination knockout cup competition. There are a total of two rounds leading up to the final. Four teams enter the preliminary round, with the two winners advancing to the semi-finals, where they will be joined by two additional clubs who were given a bye. For all matches, the winner after 90 minutes advances. If still tied, extra time, and if necessary penalties are used to determine the winner.

Bayern Munich		Round	Werder Bremen
Opponent	Result	2004 DFB-Ligapokal	Opponent	Result
Bayer Leverkusen	3–0	Semi-finals	VfB Stuttgart	2–0

== Match ==
=== Details ===
2 August 2004
18:00 CEST

Bayern Munich	3–2	Werder Bremen
Deisler 27', 43'; Ballack 65'	Report	Klasnić 68'; Ismaël 74'

Bruchwegstadion, Mainz
Attendance: 13,000
Referee: Lutz Michael Fröhlich (Berlin)

**Bayern Munich**	**Werder Bremen**

GK	1	(Germany) Oliver Kahn (c)
RB	18	(Germany) Andreas Görlitz
CB	6	(Argentina) Martín Demichelis
CB	25	(Germany) Thomas Linke
LB	20	(Bosnia and Herzegovina) Hasan Salihamidžić
DM	8	(Germany) Torsten Frings
RM	26	(Germany) Sebastian Deisler		(substituted off) 71'
CM	13	(Germany) Michael Ballack
LM	11	(Brazil) Zé Roberto		(substituted off) 46'
CF	10	(Netherlands) Roy Makaay		(substituted off) 46'
CF	24	(Paraguay) Roque Santa Cruz
Substitutes:
GK	22	(Germany) Michael Rensing
DF	3	(Brazil) Lúcio	Booked	(substituted on) 46'
DF	4	(Ghana) Samuel Kuffour
MF	7	(Germany) Mehmet Scholl
MF	16	(Germany) Jens Jeremies		(substituted on) 71'
MF	34	(Germany) Piotr Trochowski
FW	9	(Iran) Vahid Hashemian		(substituted on) 46'
Manager:
(Germany) Felix Magath

GK	1	(Germany) Andreas Reinke
RB	3	(Finland) Petri Pasanen
CB	25	(France) Valérien Ismaël
CB	2	(Germany) Frank Fahrenhorst
LB	7	(Canada) Paul Stalteri		(substituted off) 46'
DM	6	(Germany) Frank Baumann (c)		(substituted off) 46'
CM	24	(Germany) Tim Borowski
CM	4	(Germany) Fabian Ernst		(substituted off) 83'
AM	10	(France) Johan Micoud	Booked
CF	17	(Croatia) Ivan Klasnić	Booked
CF	11	(Germany) Miroslav Klose
Substitutes:
GK	16	(Germany) Pascal Borel
DF	23	(Switzerland) Ludovic Magnin		(substituted on) 46'
MF	15	(Finland) Pekka Lagerblom		(substituted on) 46'
MF	27	(Germany) Christian Schulz
FW	38	(Paraguay) Nelson Valdez		(substituted on) 83'
Manager:
(Germany) Thomas Schaaf
