= 1998 DFB-Ligapokal final =

German League Cup
- Event: 1998 DFB-Ligapokal
Bayern Munich	VfB Stuttgart
4	0
- Date: 8 August 1998
- Venue: BayArena, Leverkusen
- Referee: Lutz Michael Fröhlich (Berlin)
- Attendance: 14,000

The 1998 DFB-Ligapokal final decided the winner of the 1998 DFB-Ligapokal, the 2nd edition of the reiterated DFB-Ligapokal, a knockout football cup competition.

The match was played on 8 August 1998 at the BayArena in Leverkusen. Bayern Munich won the match 4–0 against VfB Stuttgart for their 2nd title.

== Teams ==
Team	Qualification for tournament	Previous appearances (bold indicates winners)
Bayern Munich^{TH}	1997–98 DFB-Pokal winners and 1997–98 Bundesliga runners-up	1 (**1997**)
VfB Stuttgart	1997–98 Bundesliga fourth place	1 (1997)

== Route to the final ==
The DFB-Ligapokal is a six team single-elimination knockout cup competition. There are a total of two rounds leading up to the final. Four teams enter the preliminary round, with the two winners advancing to the semi-finals, where they will be joined by two additional clubs who were given a bye. For all matches, the winner after 90 minutes advances. If still tied, extra time, and if necessary penalties are used to determine the winner.

Bayern Munich		Round	VfB Stuttgart
Opponent	Result	1998 DFB-Ligapokal	Opponent	Result
Bye		Preliminary round	Schalke 04	2–1
Bayer Leverkusen	1–0	Semi-finals	1. FC Kaiserslautern	3–2

== Match ==
=== Details ===
8 August 1998
19:00 CEST

Bayern Munich	4–0	VfB Stuttgart
Élber 4', 25', 41'; Jancker 89'	Report

BayArena, Leverkusen
Attendance: 14,000
Referee: Lutz Michael Fröhlich (Berlin)

**Bayern Munich**	**VfB Stuttgart**

GK	1	(Germany) Oliver Kahn
CB	2	(Germany) Markus Babbel
CB	10	(Germany) Lothar Matthäus (c)		(substituted off) 67'
CB	5	(Germany) Thomas Helmer
RWB	8	(Germany) Thomas Strunz
LWB	18	(Germany) Michael Tarnat
CM	11	(Germany) Stefan Effenberg
CM	17	(Germany) Thorsten Fink
RW	14	(Germany) Mario Basler		(substituted off) 61'
LW	20	(Bosnia and Herzegovina) Hasan Salihamidžić
CF	9	(Brazil) Giovane Élber		(substituted off) 72'
Substitutes:
GK	22	(Germany) Bernd Dreher
DF	25	(Germany) Thomas Linke
MF	13	(Germany) Jens Jeremies		(substituted on) 67'
FW	19	(Germany) Carsten Jancker		(substituted on) 72'
FW	21	(Germany) Alexander Zickler	Booked	(substituted on) 61'
Manager:
(Germany) Ottmar Hitzfeld

GK	1	(Austria) Franz Wohlfahrt
CB	2	(Germany) Martin Spanring	(substituted off) 35'
CB	5	(Netherlands) Frank Verlaat (c)	(substituted off) 46'
CB	4	(Germany) Thomas Berthold
RWB	7	(Federal Republic of Yugoslavia) Kristijan Đorđević
LWB	15	(North Macedonia) Mitko Stojkovski
DM	20	(Croatia) Zvonimir Soldo
CM	8	(Germany) Michael Zeyer	(substituted off) 27'
CM	22	(Hungary) Krisztián Lisztes
AM	10	(Bulgaria) Krasimir Balakov
CF	11	(Germany) Fredi Bobic
Substitutes:
GK	25	(Germany) Marc Ziegler
MF	17	(Germany) Timo Rost	(substituted on) 46'
MF	18	(Guinea) Pablo Thiam	(substituted on) 35'
FW	9	(Federal Republic of Yugoslavia) Sreto Ristić	(substituted on) 27'
FW	13	(Federal Republic of Yugoslavia) Saša Marković
Manager:
(Germany) Winfried Schäfer
