= 1999–2000 FC Bayern Munich season =

100th season in existence of Bayern Munich

FC Bayern Munich
1999–2000 season
- Manager: Ottmar Hitzfeld
- Bundesliga: Winners
- DFB-Pokal: Winners
- DFB-Ligapokal: Winners
- UEFA Champions League: Semi-finals
- Top goalscorer: League: Giovane Élber (14 goals); All: Paulo Sérgio (21 goals)
Home colours	Away colours	Third colours

The 1999–2000 FC Bayern Munich season was the 100th season in the club's history. FC Bayern Munich clinched its second consecutive league title, its third consecutive DFB-Ligapokal championship, and the 1999–2000 DFB-Pokal.

== Squad ==
=== Squad, appearances and goals ===
No.	Pos	Nat	Player	Total		Bundesliga		Champions League		DFB-Pokal	
No.	Pos	Nat	Player	Apps	Goals	Apps	Goals	Apps	Goals	Apps	Goals
1	GK	(Germany) GER	Oliver Kahn	45	0	27	0	13	0	5	0
22	GK	(Germany) GER	Bernd Dreher	6	0	6	0	0	0	0	0
33	GK	(Germany) GER	Stefan Wessels	5	0	2	0	3	0	0	0
2	DF	(Germany) GER	Markus Babbel	41	1	26	1	11	0	4	0
18	DF	(Germany) GER	Michael Tarnat	39	2	26	1	10	1	3	0
25	DF	(Germany) GER	Thomas Linke	39	2	27	1	11	1	1	0
4	DF	(Ghana) GHA	Samuel Kuffour	34	3	18	2	13	0	3	1
3	DF	(France) FRA	Bixente Lizarazu	33	1	22	1	10	0	1	0
5	DF	(Sweden) SWE	Patrik Andersson	30	0	16	0	9	0	5	0
30	DF	(Sweden) SWE	Nils-Eric Johansson	1	0	0	0	1	0	0	0
20	MF	(Bosnia and Herzegovina) BIH	Hasan Salihamidžić	51	5	30	4	16	0	5	1
16	MF	(Germany) GER	Jens Jeremies	44	4	30	3	10	0	4	1
11	MF	(Germany) GER	Stefan Effenberg (captain)	43	4	27	2	11	2	5	0
7	MF	(Germany) GER	Mehmet Scholl	40	10	25	6	12	3	3	1
17	MF	(Germany) GER	Thorsten Fink	40	1	25	0	11	1	4	0
6	MF	(Germany) GER	Michael Wiesinger	19	1	13	1	4	0	2	0
8	MF	(Germany) GER	Thomas Strunz	12	1	9	0	2	1	1	0
15	MF	(Poland) POL	Sławomir Wojciechowski	5	1	3	1	1	0	1	0
34	MF	(Zambia) ZAM	Andrew Sinkala	2	0	1	0	0	0	1	0
31	MF	(Czech Republic) CZE	David Jarolím	1	0	0	0	1	0	0	0
24	FW	(Paraguay) PAR	Roque Santa Cruz	48	9	28	5	15	1	5	3
13	FW	(Brazil) BRA	Paulo Sérgio	46	21	28	13	13	7	5	1
9	FW	(Brazil) BRA	Giovane Élber	41	19	26	14	12	3	3	2
19	FW	(Germany) GER	Carsten Jancker	39	14	24	9	12	3	3	2
21	FW	(Germany) GER	Alexander Zickler	27	12	14	7	10	2	3	3
26	FW	(Italy) ITA	Antonio Di Salvo	1	0	0	0	1	0	0	0
Players sold or loaned out after the start of the season:
10	DF	(Germany) GER	Lothar Matthäus	26	1	15	1	9	0	2	0
14	FW	(Germany) GER	Mario Basler	2	0	2	0	0	0	0	0

=== Goals ===
Pos.	Player	BL	CL	Cup	Overall
1	(Brazil) Paulo Sérgio	13	7	1	21
2	(Brazil) Giovane Élber	14	3	2	19
3	(Germany) Carsten Jancker	9	3	2	14
4	(Germany) Alexander Zickler	7	2	3	12
5	(Germany) Mehmet Scholl	6	3	1	10

=== Bookings ===
N	Pos.	Nat.	Name	Yellow card	Second yellow card	Red card	Notes
1	GK	(Germany)	Oliver Kahn	2			
10	DF	(Germany)	Lothar Matthäus	7			
18	DF	(Germany)	Michael Tarnat	7			
4	DF	(Ghana)	Samuel Kuffour	6	1	1	
3	DF	(France)	Bixente Lizarazu	6			
2	DF	(Germany)	Markus Babbel	5	1		
25	DF	(Germany)	Thomas Linke	1			
5	DF	(Sweden)	Patrik Andersson	1			
16	MF	(Germany)	Jens Jeremies	14		1	
11	MF	(Germany)	Stefan Effenberg	13			
20	MF	(Bosnia and Herzegovina)	Hasan Salihamidžić	10			
7	MF	(Germany)	Mehmet Scholl	9			
17	MF	(Germany)	Thorsten Fink	5			
8	MF	(Germany)	Thomas Strunz	3			
9	FW	(Brazil)	Giovane Élber	8		1	
19	FW	(Germany)	Carsten Jancker	5			
21	FW	(Germany)	Alexander Zickler	5			
13	FW	(Brazil)	Paulo Sérgio	1			

Source: Kicker
Only competitive matches
(yellow card) = Number of bookings; (second yellow card) = Number of sending offs after a second yellow card; (red card) = Number of sending offs by a direct red card.

=== Transfers and loans ===
==== Transfers in ====
No.	Pos.	Nat.	Name	Age	EU	Moving from	Type	Transfer window	Ends	Transfer fee	Source
13	FW	(Brazil)	Paulo Sérgio	30	Non-EU	Roma (Italy)	Transfer	Summer		€6,600,000	
24	FW	(Paraguay)	Roque Santa Cruz	17	EU	Olimpia (Paraguay)	Transfer	Summer		€5,000,000	
5	DF	(Sweden)	Patrik Andersson	27	EU	Borussia Mönchengladbach	Transfer	Summer		€3,000,000	
6	MF	(Germany)	Michael Wiesinger	26	EU	1. FC Nürnberg	Transfer	Summer		€1,250,000	
15	FW	(Poland)	Slawomir Wojciechowski	26	EU	Aarau (Switzerland)	Transfer	Winter		€700,000	

Total spending: ▼€16,550,000

==== Transfers out ====
No.	Pos.	Nat.	Name	Age	EU	Moving to	Type	Transfer window	Transfer fee	Source
24	FW	(Iran)	Ali Daei	30	Non-EU	Hertha BSC	Transfer	Summer	€2,700,000	
5	DF	(Germany)	Thomas Helmer	34	EU	Sunderland (England)	Transfer	Summer	Free	
10	DF	(Germany)	Lothar Matthäus	38	EU	New York Red Bulls (United States)	Transfer	Winter	Free	
14	MF	(Germany)	Mario Basler	31	EU	1. FC Kaiserslautern	Transfer	Winter	€750,000	
28	FW	(Turkey)	Berkant Göktan	18	EU	Arminia Bielefeld	Loan	Summer	Free	

Total income: ▲€3,450,000

== Results ==
=== Bundesliga ===
The 1999–2000 Bundesliga campaign began on 14 August when Bayern played in the opening game of the season against Hamburg.

14 August 1999 1	Bayern Munich	2–2	Hamburg	Olympiastadion
15:30	Babbel 33'; Élber 90'	Report	Kovač 35'; Präger 82'	Attendance: 63000 (sellout); Referee: Markus Merk (Kaiserslautern)

22 August 1999 2	Bayer Leverkusen	2–0	Bayern Munich	BayArena
17:30	Kirsten 79'; Neuville 85'	Report		Attendance: 22500 (sellout); Referee: Alfons Berg (Konz)

28 August 1999 3	Bayern Munich	1–0	SpVgg Unterhaching	Olympiastadion
15:30	Santa Cruz 40'	Report		Attendance: 63000 (sellout); Referee: Jürgen Aust (Cologne)

11 September 1999 4	MSV Duisburg	1–2	Bayern Munich	Wedaustadion
15:30	Osthoff 67'	Report	Tarnat 7'; Linke 43'	Attendance: 30112 (sellout); Referee: Edgar Steinborn (Remagen)

18 September 1999 5	Eintracht Frankfurt	1–2	Bayern Munich	Waldstadion
20:00	Salou 20'	Report	Élber 66'; Kuffour 80'	Attendance: 59500 (sellout); Referee: Bernd Heynemann (Magdeburg)

24 September 1999 6	Bayern Munich	0–1	VfB Stuttgart	Olympiastadion
20:00		Report	Balakov 75' (pen.)	Attendance: 62000; Referee: Lutz Michael Fröhlich (Berlin)

2 October 1999 7	Schalke	1–1	Bayern Munich	Parkstadion
Report	Wilmots 51'		Effenberg 90'	Attendance: 30112 (sellout); Referee: Edgar Steinborn (Remagen)

16 October 1999 8	Bayern Munich	3–1	Hertha Berlin	Olympiastadion
15:30	Élber 4'; Paulo Sérgio 14', 61'	Report	Wosz 82'	Attendance: 63000 (sellout); Referee: Uwe Kemmling (Kleinburgwedel)

23 October 1999 9	Kaiserslautern	0–2	Bayern Munich	Fritz-Walter-Stadion
15:30		Report	Santa Cruz 52'; Élber 86'	Attendance: 41500 (sellout); Referee: Hellmut Krug (Gelsenkirchen)

30 October 1999 10	Bayern Munich	5–0	Wolfsburg	Olympiastadion
15:30	Élber 11', 26', 78'; Santa Cruz 15'; Wiesinger 89'	Report		Attendance: 47000; Referee: Jürgen Jansen (Essen)

6 November 1999 11	SSV Ulm 1846	0–1	Bayern Munich	Donaustadion
15:30		Report	Jancker 44'	Attendance: 23000 (sellout); Referee: Markus Merk (Kaiserslautern)

20 November 1999 12	Bayern Munich	6–1	Freiburg	Olympiastadion
15:30	Jeremies 4'; Matthäus 12'; Paulo Sérgio 44'; Jancker 71', 87'; Zickler 75'	Report	Sellimi 14'	Attendance: 46000; Referee: Georg Dardenne (Nettersheim)

27 November 1999 13	1860 Munich	1–0	Bayern Munich	Olympiastadion
15:30	Riedl 85'	Report		Attendance: 69000 (sellout); Referee: Bernd Heynemann (Magdeburg)

4 December 1999 14	Bayern Munich	1–1	Borussia Dortmund	Olympiastadion
19:55	Jeremies 23'	Report	Kohler 50'	Attendance: 53000; Referee: Herbert Fandel (Kyllburg)

11 December 1999 15	Hansa Rostock	0–3	Bayern Munich	Ostseestadion
15:30		Report	Paulo Sérgio 45', 54'; Santa Cruz 65'	Attendance: 24500 (sellout); Referee: Uwe Kemmling (Kleinburgwedel)

14 December 1999 16	Bayern Munich	2–1	Arminia Bielefeld	Olympiastadion
20:00	Salihamidžić	Report	Labbadia 5'	Attendance: 27000; Referee: Florian Meyer (Burgdorf)

17 December 1999 17	Werder Bremen	0–2	Bayern Munich	Weserstadion
20:00		Report	Jancker 71'; Paulo Sérgio 81'	Attendance: 36000 (sellout); Referee: Lutz Michael Fröhlich (Berlin)

6 February 2000 18	Hamburg	0–0	Bayern Munich	Volksparkstadion
20:00		Report		Attendance: 53250 (sellout); Referee: Bernd Heynemann (Magdeburg)

9 February 2000 19	Bayern Munich	4–1	Bayer Leverkusen	Olympiastadion
20:00	Hoffmann 2' (o.g.); Effenberg 45'; Scholl 56'; Zickler 90'	Report	Ballack 65'	Attendance: 31000; Referee: Markus Merk (Kaiserslautern)

12 February 2000 20	SpVgg Unterhaching	0–2	Bayern Munich	Generali Sportpark
15:30		Report	Paulo Sérgio 71'; Scholl 90'	Attendance: 10300 (sellout); Referee: Uwe Kemmling (Kleinburgwedel)

19 February 2000 21	Bayern Munich	4–1	MSV Duisburg	Olympiastadion
15:30	Paulo Sérgio 62'; Élber 68'; Lizarazu 78'; Zickler 86'	Report	Wolters 75'	Attendance: 28000; Referee: Torsten Koop (Lüttenmark)

26 February 2000 22	Bayern Munich	4–1	Eintracht Frankfurt	Olympiastadion
15:30	Zickler 34', 63'; Paulo Sérgio 46'; Élber 85'	Report	Reichenberger 49'	Attendance: 45000; Referee: Hellmut Krug (Gelsenkirchen)

4 March 2000 23	VfB Stuttgart	2–0	Bayern Munich	Gottlieb-Daimler-Stadion
15:30	Balakov 50'; Lisztes 69'	Report		Attendance: 46500 (sellout); Referee: Jürgen Aust (Cologne)

11 March 2000 24	Bayern Munich	4–1	Schalke	Olympiastadion
15:30	Kuffour 42'; Zickler 47', 65'; Santa Cruz 68'	Report	Mpenza 81'	Attendance: 48000; Referee: Lutz Michael Fröhlich (Berlin)

18 March 2000 25	Hertha Berlin	1–1	Bayern Munich	Olympic Stadium
15:30	Alves 76'	Report	Jeremies 32'	Attendance: 74600 (sellout); Referee: Herbert Fandel (Kyllburg)

25 March 2000 26	Bayern Munich	2–2	Kaiserslautern	Olympiastadion
15:30	Élber 22', 61'	Report	Djorkaeff 20'; Reich 30'	Attendance: 63000 (sellout); Referee: Bernhard Zerr (Ottersweier)

1 April 2000 27	Wolfsburg	1–1	Bayern Munich	VfL Stadion
15:30	Juskowiak 60'	Report	Jancker 29'	Attendance: 20400 (sellout); Referee: Edgar Steinborn (Remagen)

8 April 2000 28	Bayern Munich	4–0	SSV Ulm 1846	Olympiastadion
15:30	Scholl 21'; Paulo Sérgio 24'; Jancker 62'; Wojciechowski 85'	Report		Attendance: 63000 (sellout); Referee: Torsten Koop (Lüttenmark)

12 April 2000 29	Freiburg	1–2	Bayern Munich	Dreisamstadion
20:00	Kobiashvili 11'	Report	Jancker 23'; Scholl 87' (pen.)	Attendance: 25000 (sellout); Referee: Uwe Kemmling (Kleinburgwedel)

15 April 2000 30	Bayern Munich	1–2	1860 Munich	Olympiastadion
15:30	Scholl 29'	Report	Max 22'; Jeremies 4' (o.g.)	Attendance: 69000 (sellout); Referee: Herbert Fandel (Kyllburg)

23 April 2000 31	Borussia Dortmund	0–1	Bayern Munich	Westfalenstadion
20:00		Report	Salihamidžić 30'	Attendance: 68600 (sellout); Referee: Markus Merk (Kaiserslautern)

29 April 2000 32	Bayern Munich	4–1	Hansa Rostock	Olympiastadion
15:30	Paulo Sérgio; Élber 62'; Scholl 82'	Report	Agali 17'	Attendance: 60000; Referee: Jürgen Aust (Cologne)

13 May 2000 33	Arminia Bielefeld	0–3	Bayern Munich	Bielefelder Alm
15:30		Report	Salihamidžić 28'; Élber 32', 42'	Attendance: 27600 (sellout); Referee: Lutz Michael Fröhlich (Berlin)

20 May 2000 34	Bayern Munich	3–1	Werder Bremen	Olympiastadion
15:30	Jancker 2', 12'; Paulo Sérgio 16'	Report	Bode 40'	Attendance: 63000 (sellout); Referee: Markus Merk (Kaiserslautern)

=== DFB Pokal ===
13 October 1999 3rd Round	SV Meppen	1–4	Bayern Munich	Emslandstadion
19:00	Capin 61'	Report	Jancker 1'; Zickler 57', 68'; Élber 82'	Attendance: 16500 (sellout); Referee: Herbert Fandel (Kyllburg)

1 December 1999 4th round	SV Waldhof Mannheim	0–3	Bayern Munich	Carl-Benz-Stadion
19:30		Report	Jeremies 36'; Zickler 80'; Salihamidžić 84' (pen.)	Attendance: 27000 (sellout); Referee: Jürgen Aust (Cologne)

22 December 1999 QF	Bayern Munich	3–0	1. FSV Mainz 05	Olympiastadion
19:00	Herzberger 18' (o.g.); Jancker 63'; Santa Cruz 70'	Report		Attendance: 11200; Referee: Hartmut Strampe (Handorf)

16 February 2000 SF	Bayern Munich	3–2	Hansa Rostock	Olympiastadion
20:30	Santa Cruz 58', 66'; Kuffour 76'	Report	Hilmar Weilandt 75'; Peter Wibrån 82'	Attendance: 10000; Referee: Edgar Steinborn (Remagen)

6 May 2000 Final	Werder Bremen	0–3	Bayern Munich	Olympic Stadium
19:30		Report	Élber 57'; Paulo Sérgio 83'; Scholl 56'	Attendance: 75841 (sellout); Referee: Alfons Berg (Konz)

=== Champions League ===
==== Group stage results ====
===== 1st Group Stage =====
Pos	Team	Pld	W	D	L	GF	GA	GD	Pts	Qualification	VAL	BAY	RAN	PSV
1	(Spain) Valencia	6	3	3	0	8	4	+4	12	Advance to second group stage	—	1–1	2–0	1–0
2	(Germany) Bayern Munich	6	2	3	1	7	6	+1	9	Advance to second group stage	1–1	—	1–0	2–1
3	(Scotland) Rangers	6	2	1	3	7	7	0	7	Transfer to UEFA Cup	1–2	1–1	—	4–1
4	(Netherlands) PSV Eindhoven	6	1	1	4	5	10	−5	4		1–1	2–1	0–1	—

Source: UEFA

15 September 1999 1	Bayern Munich (Germany)	2–1	(Netherlands) PSV Eindhoven	Munich, Germany
20:45	Paulo Sérgio 11', 69'	Report	Khokhlov 59'	Stadium: Olympiastadion; Attendance: 30000; Referee: Gilles Veissiere (France)

21 September 1999 2	Rangers (Scotland)	1–1	(Germany) Bayern Munich	Glasgow, Scotland
20:45	Albertz 22'	Report	Tarnat 90'	Stadium: Ibrox Stadium; Attendance: 49960 (sellout); Referee: Ryszard Wojcik (Poland)

28 September 1999 3	Bayern Munich (Germany)	1–1	(Spain) Valencia	Munich, Germany
20:45	Élber 6'	Report	López 80'	Stadium: Olympiastadion; Attendance: 31000; Referee: Graziano Cesari (Italy)

20 October 1999 4	Valencia (Spain)	1–1	(Germany) Bayern Munich	Valencia, Spain
20:45	Ilie 11'	Report	Effenberg 18' (pen.)	Stadium: Mestalla Stadium; Attendance: 45000; Referee: Anders Frisk (Sweden)

26 October 1999 5	PSV Eindhoven (Netherlands)	2–1	(Germany) Bayern Munich	Eindhoven, Netherlands
20:45	van Nistelrooy 39'; Nilis 57'	Report	Santa Cruz 51'	Stadium: Philips Stadion; Attendance: 28000 (sellout); Referee: Paul Durkin (England)

3 November 1999 6	Bayern Munich (Germany)	1–0	(Scotland) Rangers	Munich, Germany
20:45	Strunz 33' (pen.)	Report		Stadium: Olympiastadion; Attendance: 54000; Referee: Vitor Manuel Melo Pereira (Portugal)

===== 2nd Group Stage =====
Pos	Team	Pld	W	D	L	GF	GA	GD	Pts	Qualification	BAY	RMA	DKV	ROS
1	(Germany) Bayern Munich	6	4	1	1	13	8	+5	13	Advance to knockout stage	—	4–1	2–1	2–1
2	(Spain) Real Madrid	6	3	1	2	11	12	−1	10	Advance to knockout stage	2–4	—	2–2	3–1
3	(Ukraine) Dynamo Kyiv	6	3	1	2	10	8	+2	10		2–0	1–2	—	2–1
4	(Norway) Rosenborg	6	0	1	5	5	11	−6	1		1–1	0–1	1–2	—

Source: UEFA

24 November 1999 1	Rosenborg (Norway)	1–1	(Germany) Bayern Munich	Trondheim, Norway
20:45	Skammelsrud 47'	Report	Jancker 10'	Stadium: Lerkendal Stadion; Attendance: 14167 (sellout); Referee: Stefano Braschi (Italy)

7 December 1999 2	Bayern Munich (Germany)	2–1	(Ukraine) Dynamo Kyiv	Munich, Germany
20:45	Jancker 6'; Paulo Sérgio 80'	Report	Rebrov 50'	Stadium: Olympiastadion; Attendance: 16000; Referee: Hugh Dallas (Scotland)

29 February 2000 3	Real Madrid (Spain)	2–4	(Germany) Bayern Munich	Madrid, Spain
20:45	Morientes 25'; Raúl 48'	Report	Scholl 21'; Effenberg 24'; Fink 39'; Paulo Sérgio 66'	Stadium: Estadio Santiago Bernabéu; Attendance: 68000; Referee: Kim Milton Nielsen (Denmark)

8 March 2000 4	Bayern Munich (Germany)	4–1	(Spain) Real Madrid	Munich, Germany
20:45	Scholl 4'; Élber 30'; Zickler 79', 90'	Report	Helguera 69'	Stadium: Olympiastadion; Attendance: 60000 (sellout); Referee: Dick Jol (Netherlands)

14 March 2000 5	Bayern Munich (Germany)	2–1	(Norway) Rosenborg	Munich, Germany
20:45	Scholl 11'; Paulo Sérgio 40' (pen.)	Report	Carew 64'	Stadium: Olympiastadion; Attendance: 20000; Referee: Alfredo Trentalange (Italy)

22 March 2000 6	Dynamo Kyiv (Ukraine)	2–0	(Germany) Bayern Munich	NSC Olimpiyskiy
20:45	Kaladze 34'; Demetradze 71'	Report		Attendance: 70000; Referee: Gilles Veissiere (France)

==== Quarter-final ====
4 April 2000 1	Porto (Portugal)	1–1	(Germany) Bayern Munich	Porto, Portugal
20:45	Jardel 47'	Report	Paulo Sérgio 80'	Stadium: Estádio das Antas; Attendance: 20125; Referee: Nikolai Levnikov (Russia)

19 April 2000 2	Bayern Munich (Germany)	2–1	(Portugal) Porto	Munich, Germany
	Paulo Sérgio 15'; Linke 90'	Report	Jardel 90'	Stadium: Olympiastadion; Attendance: 47000; Referee: Hugh Dallas (Scotland)

==== Semi-final ====
3 May 2000 1	Real Madrid (Spain)	2–0	(Germany) Bayern Munich	Madrid, Spain
20:45	Anelka 4'; Jeremies 23' (o.g.)	Report		Stadium: Estadio Santiago Bernabéu; Attendance: 95000 (sellout); Referee: Anders Frisk (Sweden)

9 May 2000 2	Bayern Munich (Germany)	2–1	(Spain) Real Madrid	Munich, Germany
20:45	Jancker 12'; Élber 54'	Report	Anelka 31'	Stadium: Olympiastadion; Attendance: 60000 (sellout); Referee: Graham Poll (England)

== Sources ==
- Soccerbase.com
- Kicker
