= Dennis Grassow =

German footballer (born 1971)

Personal information
- Date of birth: 10 October 1971 (age 55)
- Place of birth: West Berlin, West Germany
- Position: Defender

Youth career
- 1987–1990: TSV 1860 München

Senior career*
Years	Team	Apps	(Gls)
1990–1991	TSV 1860 München	1	(0)
1991–1992	SpVgg Starnberg		
1992–1993	FC Starnberg		
1993–1997	SpVgg Unterhaching	51	(2)
1997	FC Bayern Munich	1	(0)
1997–1999	1. FC Köln	31	(0)
1999–2004	SpVgg Unterhaching	110	(6)
2004–2006	SV Darmstadt 98	47	(3)
2006–2009	SSV Jahn Regensburg	69	(13)

Managerial career
- 2008–2009: SSV Jahn Regensburg (playing assistant)
- 2010: SpVgg Weiden (assistant)
Medal record
Bayern Munich
Winner	DFB-Ligapokal	1997
- * Club domestic league appearances and goals

Dennis Grassow (born 10 October 1971 in Berlin) is a retired German footballer who played as a defender.

== Career ==
Grassow was born and raised in Berlin, before moving to Munich the age of 16. He joined TSV 1860 München, where he made one appearance in the Bayernliga, before moving on to SpVgg Starnberg and later FC Starnberg. He began his senior career in 1993 with SpVgg Unterhaching, where he had four successful years, which earned him a move to FC Bayern Munich.

He was unable to break into Bayern's first team, making only one appearance – in a DFB-Pokal game against DJK Waldberg, a match which Bayern won 16–1. After half a season he moved again, joining 1. FC Köln, where his arrival bolstered a struggling defence. He remained in Cologne for eighteen months, but the club was relegated at the end of the 1998–99 season, and he left, rejoining Unterhaching, who had since been promoted to the Bundesliga. The club spent two years in the Bundesliga, finishing 10th in their first season, but then suffered two consecutive relegations, falling to the third-tier Regionalliga in 2002. Grassow stayed with the club as they returned to the 2. Bundesliga, and consolidated their position, before leaving at the end of the 2003–04 season.

Grassow returned to the Regionalliga, playing for SV Darmstadt 98 for two years, before moving on to Bayernliga side SSV Jahn Regensburg in 2006. Here he was appointed captain by the coach Günter Güttler, as the side were promoted to the Regionalliga, which they followed with qualification for the new 3. Liga. After one season at this level, Grassow retired.

== Honours ==
Bayern Munich

- DFB-Liga-Pokal: 1997
