= Stefan Wessels =

German former professional footballer (born 1979)

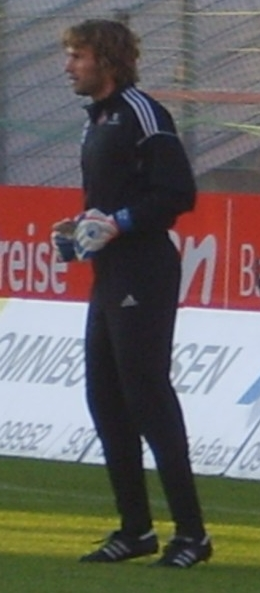
- Wessels with 1. FC Köln in 2006

Personal information
- Date of birth: 28 February 1979 (age 47)
- Place of birth: Rahden, West Germany
- Height: 1.90 m (6 ft 3 in)
- Position: Goalkeeper

Youth career
- 1985–1992: SV Eintracht Schepsdorf
- 1992–1998: TuS Lingen

Senior career*
Years	Team	Apps	(Gls)
1998–2002	Bayern Munich (A)	63	(0)
1999–2003	Bayern Munich	6	(0)
2003–2007	1. FC Köln	93	(0)
2007–2008	Everton	2	(0)
2008–2009	VfL Osnabrück	21	(0)
2009–2010	FC Basel	1	(0)
2011–2012	Odense Boldklub	35	(0)
Total		221	(0)

International career
2000	Germany U21	1	(0)
2005	Germany B	2	(0)
Medal record
Bayern Munich
Winner	DFB Liga-Pokal	1999
Winner	Bundesliga	2000
Winner	DFB-Pokal	2000
Winner	DFB Liga-Pokal	2000
Winner	Bundesliga	2001
Winner	UEFA Champions League	2001
Runner-up	UEFA Super Cup	2001
Winner	Intercontinental Cup	2001
Winner	Bundesliga	2003
Winner	DFB-Pokal	2003
FC Basel
Winner	Swiss Super League	2010
Winner	Swiss Cup	2010
Germany
Runner-up	UEFA Under-18 Championship	1998
- * Club domestic league appearances and goals

Stefan Wessels (born 28 February 1979) is a German former professional footballer who played as a goalkeeper.

== Club career ==
=== Bayern Munich ===
Wessels was a youth team player at Bayern Munich, who progressed through the reserve team and broke into the first-team squad in September 1999 after Bayern lost both goalkeepers Oliver Kahn and Bernd Dreher to injury. Wessels' first game was a 1–1 draw at Ibrox against Rangers in the Champions League. He performed impressively whenever called upon, but was unable to dislodge Kahn for more playing time. Wessels was involved in a hugely successful period for Bayern, including the 2001 Champions League win, but eventually left for 1. FC Köln in 2003, seeking first-team football. Between 1999 and 2003, he appeared in a total of eighteen matches for Bayern.

=== 1. FC Köln ===
Wessels' time in Köln was eventful, with the club relegated in his first season, before immediately gaining promotion back to the 1st division and again being relegated to the 2. Bundesliga the following season. Showing consistently good performances, Wessels was one of the few players to stand out in the squad. However, at the beginning of the 2007–08 season, Colombian goalkeeper Faryd Mondragón signed with the club, and after a fair but intense rivalry, Wessels lost his position as the club's number 1.

=== Everton ===
On 6 August 2007, Wessels agreed to a trial in England with Premier League team Everton and subsequently signed an initial one-year contract with the club on 21 August; he was given his favoured number 33 shirt. Upon signing he said:

"I am excited to be here in England. It is the first time I have played for a club outside of Germany but the Premier League is a very exciting league and I am looking forward to my time here at Everton."

Wessels was the first German player to sign for Everton in the club's history. Following a hand-injury sustained to first choice goalkeeper Tim Howard, Wessels made his Everton debut in the 1–0 home defeat to Manchester United on 15 September 2007. He made his European debut for Everton during a 1–1 draw with Ukrainian team Metalist Kharkiv and he also played against Aston Villa and Sheffield Wednesday, keeping Everton's first clean sheet of the season against the latter. However, he lost his place in the team to the returning Tim Howard for the following game against Middlesbrough.

After the game on 11 May, Everton manager David Moyes revealed that Wessels and fellow team member Thomas Gravesen would leave the club after their contracts expired. David Moyes said "I would like to thank Stefan Wessels who, after today, will be leaving us. His level of professionalism has been a credit to him and he has been a great man to have around the club."

=== VfL Osnabrück ===
In June 2008, Wessels signed a two-year contract with VfL Osnabrück of the 2. Bundesliga. He started the 2008–09 season as their first-choice goalkeeper, making his competitive debut on 8 August 2008 in their 2–0 defeat at FSV Frankfurt in the first round of the DFB-Pokal and going on to make his league debut in a 2–2 draw at FC St. Pauli on 15 August 2008. He played 21 league games for VfL, but left in June 2009, after their relegation from the 2. Bundesliga.

=== Basel ===
On 23 October 2009, Wessels signed for the Swiss side FC Basel until the end of the 2009–10 season, as a replacement for injured goalkeeper Franco Costanzo. He was able to sign outside the transfer window because he was free agent. He said "I am very pleased that it has worked out with FC Basel, and the wait has been worthwhile. I'm happy that I've signed with such a big club." He joined Basel's first team during their 2009–10 season under head coach Thorsten Fink, who he played alongside while at Bayern Munich.

After playing in one test game, Wessels played his team debut for the club in the home game in the St. Jakob-Park on 20 November as Basel won 4–2 against rivals Zürich. He played his domestic league debut for the club nine days later in the away game in the Stadion Wankdorf as Basel were defeated 2–0 by Young Boys. In the 35th minute referee Massimo Busacca awarded the home team a penalty following a handball. Wessel held the spot kick taken by Gilles Yapi Yapo.

At the end of the 2009–10 season he won the Double with his club. They won the League Championship title with 3 points advantage over second placed Young Boys. The team won the Swiss Cup, winning the final 6–0 against Lausanne-Sport.

Wessels left the club at the end of the season becoming free agent. During his time with the club Wessels played a total of 13 games for Basel. One of these games were in the Swiss Super League, one in the Swiss Cup, one in the Europa League and ten were friendly games.

=== Free agent ===
In July 2010, Wessels joined West Ham United on trial, and played in the 24 July friendly match against Burton Albion, a 4–2 defeat.

=== Odense Boldklub ===
On 27 January 2011, Wessels signed a one-and-a-half-year contract with Odense Boldklub, replacing Northern Irish goalkeeper Roy Carroll.

== International career ==
Wessels has represented Germany, at various youth levels, up to the under-21 team, for whom he made one appearance. He also played for Team 2006, a Germany B team assembled in preparation for the 2006 World Cup, but did not make it into the senior squad.

== Coaching career ==
After working as a goalkeeping coach at the youth academies of SV Meppen and VfL Osnabrück, Wessels joined the German Football Association in 2014 as goalkeeping coach of the Germany U15 team. He subsequently worked with the U18, U19 and U20 national teams before joining the senior national team's coaching staff during preparations for UEFA Euro 2024. In 2025, he was appointed second goalkeeping coach of the senior national team.

== Career statistics ==
Appearances and goals by club, season and competition
Club	Season	League			Cup		League cup		Continental		Other		Total	
Club	Season	Division	Apps	Goals	Apps	Goals	Apps	Goals	Apps	Goals	Apps	Goals	Apps	Goals
Bayern Munich II	1998–99	Regionalliga Süd	18	0	—		—		—		—		18	0
Bayern Munich II	1998–2000	Regionalliga Süd	18	0	—		—		—		—		18	0
Bayern Munich II	2000–01	Regionalliga Süd	18	0	—		—		—		—		18	0
Bayern Munich II	2001–02	Regionalliga Süd	9	0	—		—		—		—		9	0
Bayern Munich II	Total		63	0	—		—		—		—		63	0
Bayern Munich	1999–2000	Bundesliga	2	0	0	0	0	0	3 (Note: Appearance(s) in UEFA Champions League)	0	—		5	0
Bayern Munich	2000–01	Bundesliga	1	0	0	0	0	0	2	0	0	0	3	0
Bayern Munich	2001–02	Bundesliga	2	0	1	0	0	0	2	0	0	0	5	0
Bayern Munich	2002–03	Bundesliga	1	0	0	0	1	0	3	0	—		5	0
Bayern Munich	Total		6	0	1	0	1	0	10	0	0	0	18	0
1. FC Köln	2003–04	Bundesliga	32	0	0	0	—		—		—		32	0
1. FC Köln	2004–05	2. Bundesliga	7	0	1	0	—		—		—		8	0
1. FC Köln	2005–06	Bundesliga	22	0	1	0	—		—		—		23	0
1. FC Köln	2006–07	2. Bundesliga	32	0	3	0	—		—		—		35	0
1. FC Köln	2007–08	2. Bundesliga	0	0	0	0	—		—		—		0	0
1. FC Köln	Total		93	0	5	0	—		—		—		98	0
Everton	2007–08	Premier League	2	0	1	0	2	0	1 (Note: Appearance(s) in UEFA Cup)	0	—		6	0
VfL Osnabrück	2008–09	2. Bundesliga	21	0	1	0	—		—		0	0	22	0
FC Basel	2009–10	Swiss Super League	1	0	1	0	—		1 (Note: Appearance(s) in UEFA Europa League)	0	—		3	0
OB	2010–11	Danish Superliga	13	0	0	0	—		—		—		13	0
OB	2011–12	Danish Superliga	22	0	1	0	—		8 (Note: Four appearances in UEFA Champions League, Four appearances in UEFA Europa League)	0	—		31	0
OB	Total		35	0	1	0	—		8	0	—		44	0
Career total			221	0	10	0	0	0	20	0	3	0	254	0

== Honours ==
Bayern Munich

- Bundesliga: 1999–2000, 2000–01, 2002–03
- DFB-Pokal: 1999–2000, 2002–03
- DFB-Liga-Pokal: 1999, 2000
- UEFA Champions League: 2000–01
- Intercontinental Cup: 2001
- UEFA Super Cup runner-up: 2001

1. FC Köln

- 2. Bundesliga: 2004–05

FC Basel

- Swiss Super League: 2009–10
- Swiss Cup: 2009–10

Germany U18

- UEFA Under-18 Championship: runner-up 1998
