= Thomas Strunz =

German footballer (born 1968)

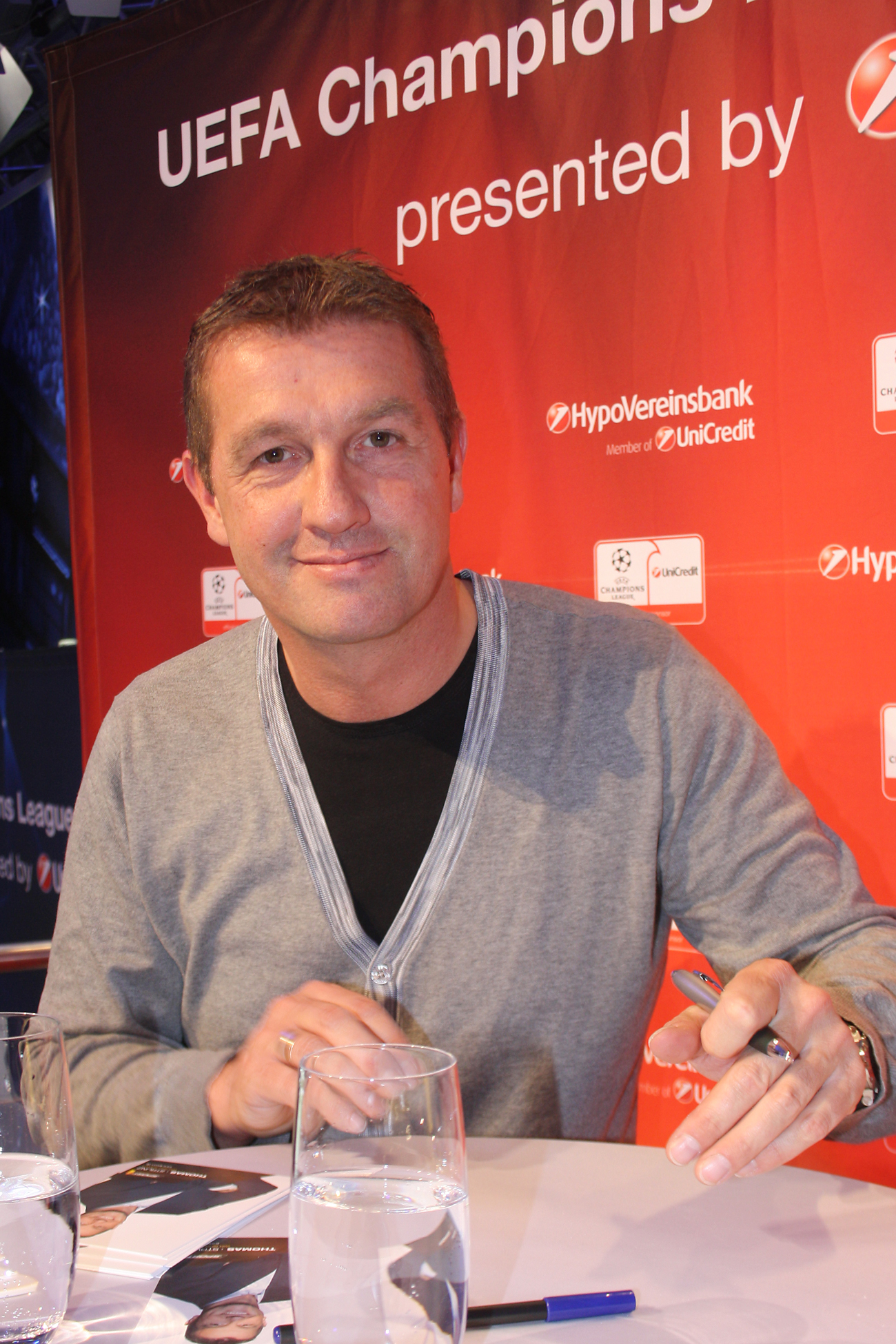
- Strunz signing autographs in 2010

Personal information
- Date of birth: 25 April 1968 (age 58)
- Place of birth: Duisburg, West Germany
- Height: 1.83 m (6 ft 0 in)
- Position: Defensive midfielder

Youth career
- 1977–1981: TuRA 88 Duisburg
- 1981–1986: MSV Duisburg

Senior career*
Years	Team	Apps	(Gls)
1986–1989	MSV Duisburg	94	(30)
1989–1992	Bayern Munich	59	(12)
1992–1995	VfB Stuttgart	79	(9)
1995–2000	Bayern Munich	97	(11)
Total		329	(62)

International career
1990	West Germany U21	2	(0)
1990–1999	Germany	41	(1)
Medal record
Men's football
Representing Germany
UEFA European Championship
Winner	1996 England
- * Club domestic league appearances and goals

Thomas Strunz (born 25 April 1968) is a German former professional footballer who played mostly as a defensive midfielder.

Over the course of 12 seasons, he amassed Bundesliga totals of 235 games and 32 goals, representing in the competition Bayern Munich and Stuttgart. He won 12 major club titles in his career.

Strunz gained 41 caps for Germany in nine years. He was part of the squad that won Euro 1996.

== Club career ==
Born in Duisburg, North Rhine-Westphalia, Strunz started his career playing for hometown club MSV Duisburg, but moved to FC Bayern Munich aged 21. He made his Bundesliga debut on 31 August 1989 in a 4–0 home win against Hamburger SV, and proceeded to score five goals in 20 matches in his first season.

Strunz joined VfB Stuttgart for 1992–93, netting five times in his debut campaign before returning to Bayern after three years. In his two spells with the Bavarian side he won four Bundesliga championship medals and two DFB-Pokals, adding the 1995–96 UEFA Cup in which he scored two goals in nine games. In his last full season his team went on to win the league title but he played rarely due to recurrent injuries. He retired from football after leaving the club in late 2000.

== International career ==
Strunz made his debut for Germany on 10 October 1990 in a 3–1 friendly win in Sweden. He went on to represent the nation at the 1994 FIFA World Cup and the victorious UEFA Euro 1996.

During the latter competition, Strunz appeared in five of six matches (being sent off against Italy and subsequently suspended for the quarter-final), converting his penalty shootout attempt in the semi-finals and playing the entire final against the Czech Republic.

== Honours ==
=== Club ===
Bayern Munich

- Bundesliga: 1989–90, 1996–97, 1998–99, 1999–2000
- DFB-Pokal: 1997–98, 1999–2000
- DFB-Ligapokal: 1997, 1998, 2000
- DFL-Supercup: 1990
- UEFA Cup: 1995–96
- UEFA Champions League runner-up: 1998–99

VfB Stuttgart

- DFL-Supercup: 1992

=== International ===
Germany

- UEFA European Championship: 1996
- U.S. Cup: 1993

== Career statistics ==
=== International ===
Appearances and goals by national team and year
National team	Year	Apps	Goals
Germany	1990	2	0
Germany	1992	1	0
Germany	1993	5	0
Germany	1994	13	0
Germany	1995	4	1
Germany	1996	9	0
Germany	1998	1	0
Germany	1999	6	0
Total		41	1

=== International goal ===
Scores and results list Germany's goal tally first.

#	Date	Venue	Opponent	Score	Result	Competition
1.	7 June 1995	Vasil Levski, Sofia, Bulgaria	Bulgaria	2–0	2–3	Euro 1996 qualifying

== Post-playing career ==
After retiring, Strunz served as general manager at VfL Wolfsburg for nearly a year, being fired on 19 December 2005 – head coach Holger Fach was sacked on the same day, and the former was awarded €2.750.000 in compensation. In April 2008, Strunz enrolled in the same capacity at lowly Rot-Weiss Essen, being fired on 12 September of the following year.

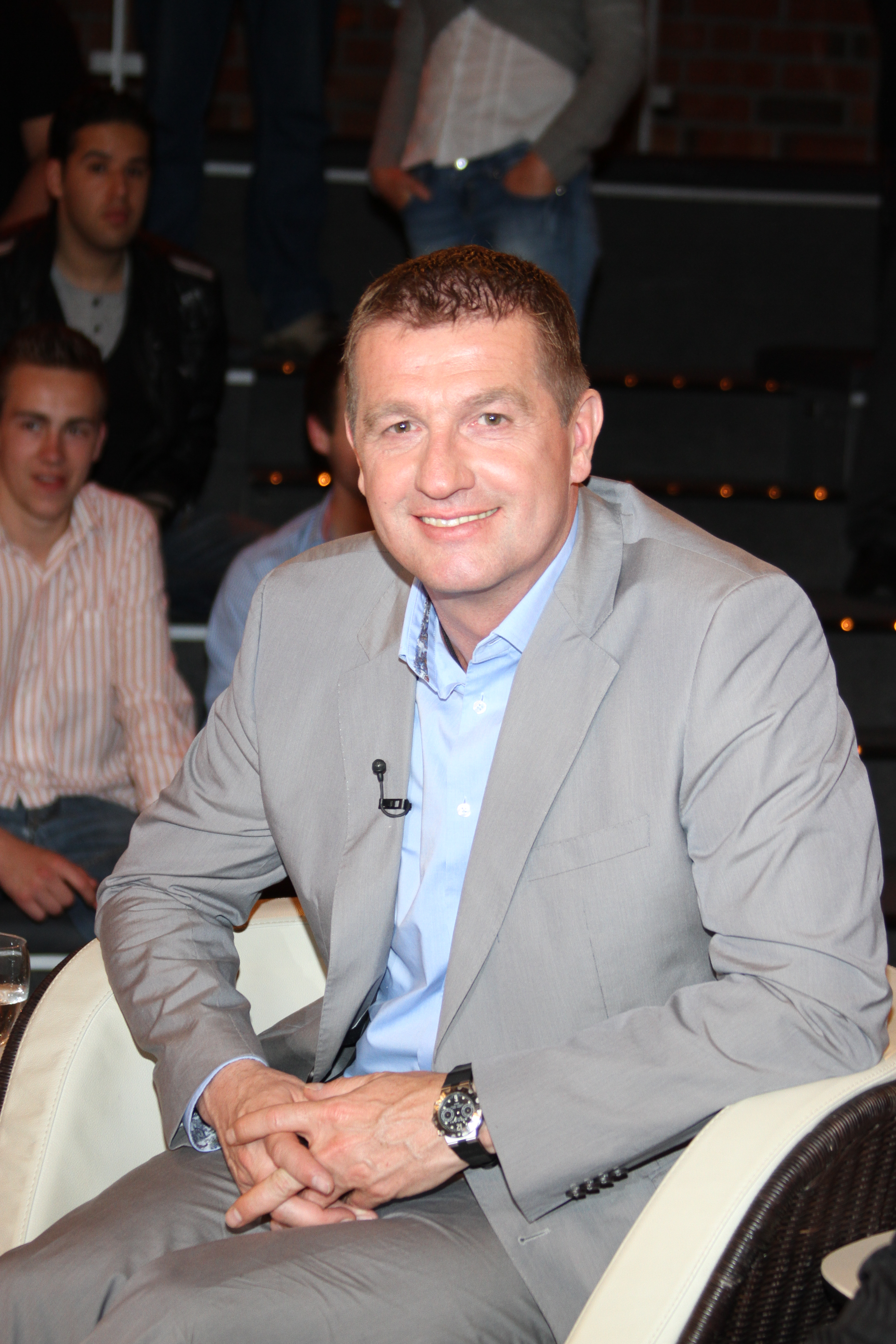
Strunz in 2012

Later, Strunz worked as football pundit for German TV channel Sport1.

== Personal life ==
Strunz's wife, Claudia, left him for fellow German international Stefan Effenberg.

== Trivia ==
On 10 March 1998, Strunz was one of the main targets in an infamous press conference held by a furious Bayern manager Giovanni Trapattoni, who addressed the media in broken German. This gave Strunz the possibility to work as a TV pundit after his football career.
