= Thomas Linke =

German footballer

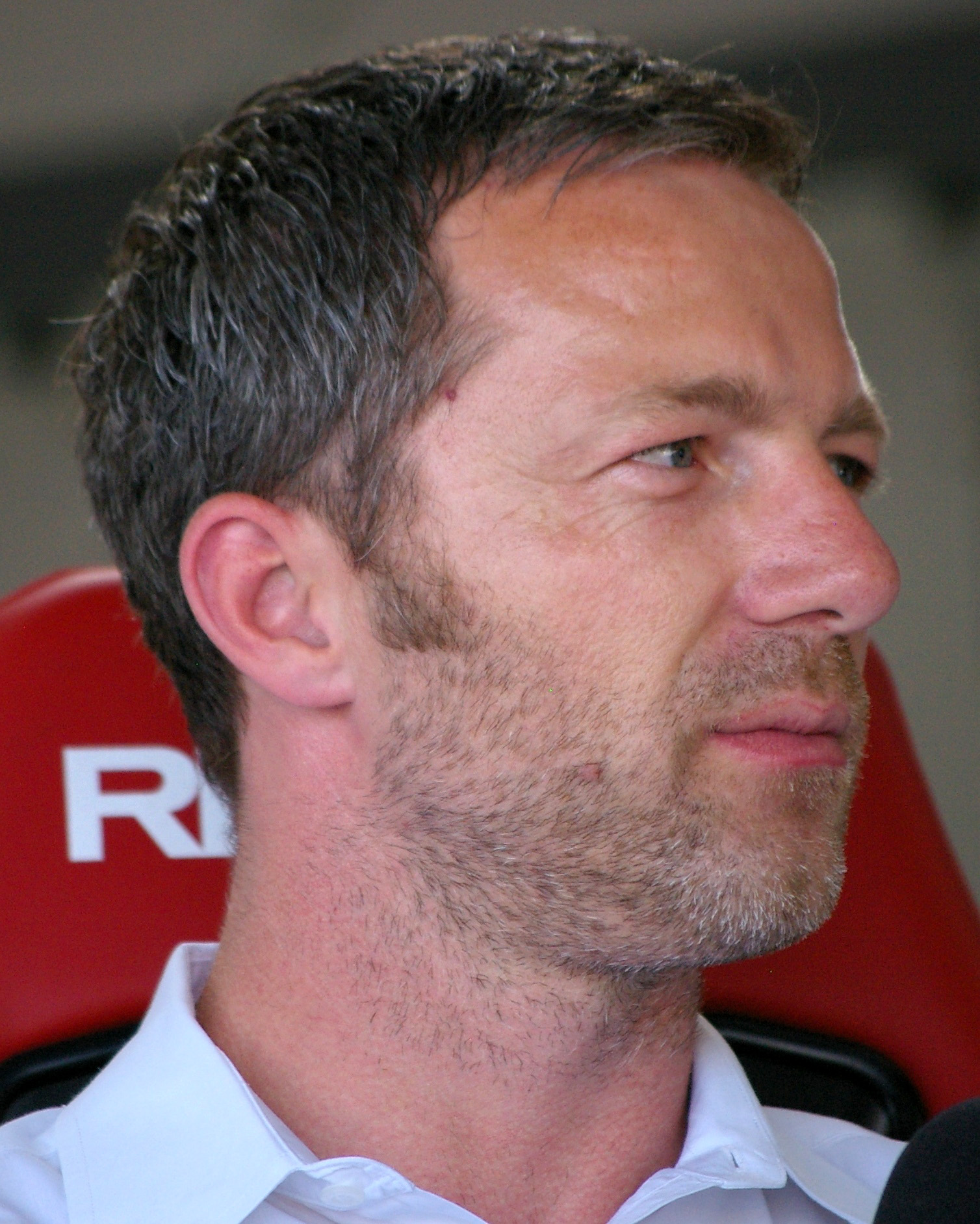
- Linke in 2010

Personal information
- Date of birth: 26 December 1969 (age 56)
- Place of birth: Sömmerda, East Germany
- Height: 1.83 m (6 ft 0 in)
- Position: Centre-back

Youth career
- 1977–1983: Robotron Sömmerda
- 1983–1988: Rot-Weiß Erfurt

Senior career*
Years	Team	Apps	(Gls)
1988–1992	Rot-Weiß Erfurt	85	(2)
1992–1998	Schalke 04	175	(13)
1998–2005	Bayern Munich	165	(2)
2005–2007	Red Bull Salzburg	51	(3)
2007–2008	Bayern Munich II	27	(1)
Total		502	(21)

International career
1997–2004	Germany	43	(1)
Medal record
Men's football
Representing Germany
FIFA World Cup
Runner-up	2002 Korea/Japan
- * Club domestic league appearances and goals

Thomas Linke (born 26 December 1969) is a German former professional footballer who played as a centre-back. He last worked as the director of football of FC Ingolstadt 04.

Linke was remembered as a hard-nosed tackler with tremendous heading ability, and played in 13 Bundesliga seasons in representation of Schalke 04 and Bayern Munich, totalling 340 games. Having gained his first cap for Germany in his late 20s, he went on to represent the country in one World Cup and one European Championship.

== Club career ==
=== Early years and Schalke 04 ===
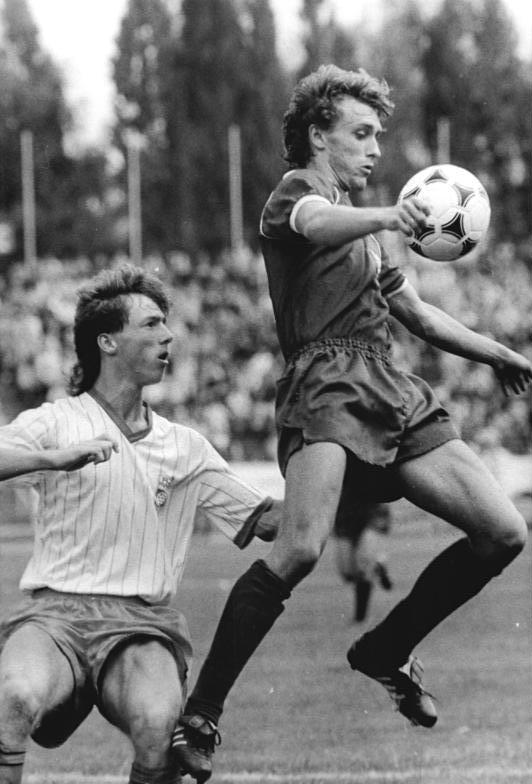
Linke (left) playing in 1989

Born in Sömmerda, Bezirk Erfurt, East Germany, Linke began playing football in 1977 with local BSG Robotron Sömmerda. In 1983, he transferred to FC Rot-Weiß Erfurt, eventually making the breakthrough into the first team in 1989; with the latter, he had the opportunity to gain experience by playing in the DDR-Oberliga.

After finishing third in the last year of the competition, the club was placed into the newly consolidated 2. Bundesliga in 1991, as part of the German reunification process. Linke was a starter throughout the season but was ultimately unable to prevent it from being relegated, while also appearing in four games in the UEFA Cup.

During Rot-Weiß Erfurt's German Cup win over FC Schalke 04, the latter team's management took notice of Linke and signed him for the following campaign. He quickly earned his way into the starting line-up and, from 1992 until 1998, appeared in a total of 175 Bundesliga games for the Royal Blues, his debut coming on 1 September 1992 in a 0–0 home draw against SV Werder Bremen.

Linke's crowning achievement during his tenure with Schalke was the penalty shootout win over Inter Milan, in the 1996–97 UEFA Cup. He appeared in 11 matches during the victorious run, scoring twice.

=== Bayern Munich ===
In 1998, Linke joined national giants FC Bayern Munich, where he would go on to experience the most successful chapter of his professional career. In his first season, he scored his first goal for the Bavarians in a 3–1 derby home win over TSV 1860 München on 7 November, but would also start in the notorious UEFA Champions League final against Manchester United.

With Bayern, Linke won five leagues, three German Cups and four league cups, in addition to the 2001 editions of the Champions League and the Intercontinental Cup. In the final of the former, he scored the final penalty to give his team the victory in the shootout against Valencia CF.

Since first joining Bayern, numerous critics prophesied that Linke would never be able to hold on to his starting spot in the center of defense. The player made it a point to prove his critics wrong by continually impressing with solid, if unspectacular, performances. Not until his last year, under coach Felix Magath, did he end up losing his starting role to Croatian Robert Kovač, appearing in only 11 games but helping in another league conquest.

=== Red Bull Salzburg ===
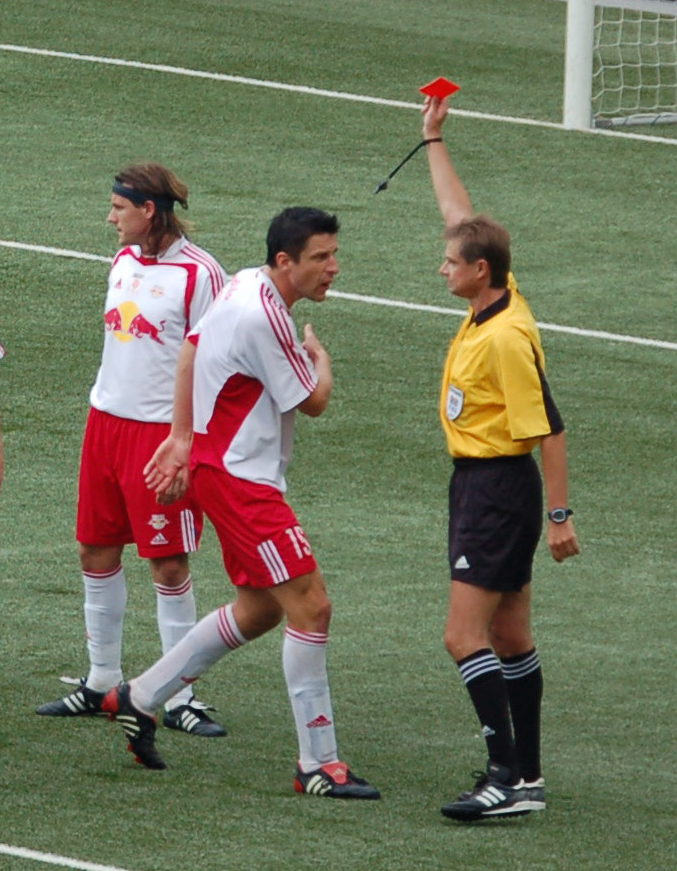
Linke receives a Red Card from referee Gerald Lehner during the game against FKA Vienna, 18 September 2005

At the beginning of 2005–06, 35-year-old Linke made the decision to extend his playing career by transferring to the Austrian Bundesliga, linking up with newly re-tooled FC Red Bull Salzburg alongside former Bayern teammate Alexander Zickler. Soon after arriving, he was appointed team captain, and became a regular fixture. During his second season, he added one last piece of silverware to his extensive collection by winning the league; on 3 May 2007, the club informed him that his initial two-year contract would not be extended.

=== Final years ===
On 13 June 2007, aged almost 38, Linke agreed to a Bayern return, linking with the club's amateur side in the third division. In early 2008, he re-joined Salzburg, serving as assistant to director of football Heinz Hochhauser and subsequently retiring from playing.

== International career ==
Linke's debut with the Germany national side took place in a 3–0 victory over South Africa on 15 November 1997. He represented the nation at UEFA Euro 2000 and the 2002 FIFA World Cup.

In the latter competition, Linke played a key role in the team that would eventually finish runner-up after a 0–2 loss in the final to Brazil. Additionally, he scored his only international goal during the group stage match against Saudi Arabia, an 8–0 routing.

Linke announced his international retirement after that tournament, but was called up for national duty once more in 2004. After numerous injuries to the defensive line, national coach Jürgen Klinsmann personally called the player on the telephone and asked him to temporarily come out of retirement. He appeared, being booked, in a 3–1 friendly win in Austria on 18 August 2004, and retired immediately after, with 43 caps to his name.

== Career statistics ==
=== Club ===
Appearances and goals by club, season and competition
Club	Season	League			National cup		League cup		Europe		Total	
Club	Season	Division	Apps	Goals	Apps	Goals	Apps	Goals	Apps	Goals	Apps	Goals
Rot-Weiß Erfurt	1988–89	DDR-Oberliga	5	0	0	0	–		–		5	0
Rot-Weiß Erfurt	1989–90	DDR-Oberliga	22	0	1	0	–		–		23	0
Rot-Weiß Erfurt	1990–91	DDR-Oberliga	25	1	4	0	–		–		29	1
Rot-Weiß Erfurt	1991–92	2. Bundesliga	27	1	2	0	–		4 (Note: Appearances in the UEFA Cup)	0	33	1
Rot-Weiß Erfurt	Total		79	2	7	0	–		4	0	90	2
Schalke 04	1992–93	Bundesliga	25	0	1	0	–		2 (Note: Appearances in the UEFA Intertoto Cup)	0	28	0
Schalke 04	1993–94	Bundesliga	31	4	1	0	–		–		32	4
Schalke 04	1994–95	Bundesliga	31	2	4	0	–		–		5	2
Schalke 04	1995–96	Bundesliga	27	3	2	0	–		–		29	3
Schalke 04	1996–97	Bundesliga	30	1	2	1	–		11	2	43	4
Schalke 04	1997–98	Bundesliga	31	3	2	0	–		7	0	40	3
Schalke 04	Total		175	13	12	1	–		20	2	207	16
Bayern Munich	1998–99	Bundesliga	27	1	5	1	1	0	9 (Note: Appearances in the UEFA Champions League)	0	42	2
Bayern Munich	1999–2000	Bundesliga	27	1	1	0	2	0	11	1	41	2
Bayern Munich	2000–01	Bundesliga	28	0	0	0	1	0	15	1	44	1
Bayern Munich	2001–02	Bundesliga	20	0	5	0	1	0	6 (Note: One appearance in the UEFA Super Cup, five appearances in the UEFA Champions League)	0	32	0
Bayern Munich	2002–03	Bundesliga	32	0	6	0	0	0	6	1	44	1
Bayern Munich	2003–04	Bundesliga	21	0	2	0	1	0	4	0	28	0
Bayern Munich	2004–05	Bundesliga	11	0	1	0	2	0	4	0	18	0
Bayern Munich	Total		165	2	20	1	8	0	55	3	249	6
Bayern Munich II	2004–05		0	0	1	0	–		–		1	0
Red Bull Salzburg	2005–06	Austrian Bundesliga	24	3	1	0	–		–		25	3
Red Bull Salzburg	2006–07	Austrian Bundesliga	27	0	2	0	–		6 (Note: Four appearances in the UEFA Champions League, two appearances in the UEFA Cup)	0	35	0
Red Bull Salzburg	Total		51	3	3	0	–		6	0	60	3
Bayern Munich II	2007–08	Regionalliga Süd	33	1	–		–		–		33	1
Career total			504	21	43	2	8	0	85	5	640	28

=== International ===
Germany
Year	Apps	Goals
1997	1	0
1998	2	0
1999	7	0
2000	11	0
2001	7	0
2002	14	1
2003	0	0
2004	1	0
Total	43	1

Scores and results table. Germany's goal tally first:

#	Date	Venue	Opponent	Score	Result	Competition
1.	1 June 2002	Sapporo Dome, Sapporo, Japan	Saudi Arabia	6–0	8–0	2002 World Cup

== Honours ==
Schalke 04

- UEFA Cup: 1996–97

Bayern Munich

- Bundesliga: 1998–99, 1999–2000, 2000–01, 2002–03, 2004–05
- DFB-Pokal: 1999–2000, 2002–03, 2004–05; runner-up: 1998–99
- DFB-Ligapokal: 1998, 1999, 2000, 2004
- UEFA Champions League: 2000–01; runner-up: 1998–99
- Intercontinental Cup: 2001

Red Bull Salzburg

- Austrian Bundesliga: 2006–07

Germany

- FIFA World Cup runner-up: 2002
