= 1997 DFB-Ligapokal final =

German League Cup
- Event: 1997 DFB-Ligapokal
Bayern Munich	VfB Stuttgart
2	0
- Date: 26 July 1997
- Venue: Ulrich-Haberland-Stadion, Leverkusen
- Referee: Jürgen Jansen (Essen)
- Attendance: 15,000

The 1997 DFB-Ligapokal final decided the winner of the 1997 DFB-Ligapokal, the 1st edition of the reiterated DFB-Ligapokal, a knockout football cup competition.

The match was played on 26 July 1997 at the Ulrich-Haberland-Stadion in Leverkusen. Bayern Munich won the match 2–0 against VfB Stuttgart for their 1st title.

== Teams ==
Team	Qualification for tournament	Previous appearances (bold indicates winners)
Bayern Munich	1996–97 Bundesliga champions	None
VfB Stuttgart	1996–97 DFB-Pokal winners and 1996–97 Bundesliga fourth place	None

== Route to the final ==
The DFB-Ligapokal is a six team single-elimination knockout cup competition. There are a total of two rounds leading up to the final. Four teams enter the preliminary round, with the two winners advancing to the semi-finals, where they will be joined by two additional clubs who were given a bye. For all matches, the winner after 90 minutes advances. If still tied, extra time, and if necessary penalties are used to determine the winner.

Bayern Munich		Round	VfB Stuttgart
Opponent	Result	1997 DFB-Ligapokal	Opponent	Result
Borussia Dortmund	2–0	Semi-finals	Karlsruher SC	3–0

== Match ==
=== Details ===
26 July 1997
19:30 CEST

Bayern Munich	2–0	VfB Stuttgart
Basler 57'; Élber 71'	Report

Ulrich-Haberland-Stadion, Leverkusen
Attendance: 15,000
Referee: Jürgen Jansen (Essen)

**Bayern Munich**	**VfB Stuttgart**

GK	1	(Germany) Oliver Kahn
SW	10	(Germany) Lothar Matthäus (c)
CB	2	(Germany) Markus Babbel
CB	5	(Germany) Thomas Helmer	Booked
RWB	16	(Germany) Dietmar Hamann	Booked	(substituted off) 86'
LWB	11	(France) Bixente Lizarazu
CM	8	(Germany) Thomas Strunz
CM	6	(Germany) Christian Nerlinger
AM	14	(Germany) Mario Basler		(substituted off) 60'
CF	20	(Italy) Ruggiero Rizzitelli		(substituted off) 65'
CF	9	(Brazil) Giovane Élber
Substitutes:
GK	22	(Germany) Bernd Dreher
DF	15	(Germany) Dennis Grassow
MF	7	(Germany) Mehmet Scholl		(substituted on) 60'
MF	17	(Germany) Thorsten Fink		(substituted on) 86'
MF	18	(Germany) Michael Tarnat
FW	19	(Germany) Carsten Jancker		(substituted on) 65'
Manager:
(Italy) Giovanni Trapattoni

GK	1	(Austria) Franz Wohlfahrt
CB	8	(Germany) Marco Haber
CB	20	(Croatia) Zvonimir Soldo	Booked
CB	4	(Germany) Thomas Berthold
RWB	7	(Germany) Matthias Hagner		(substituted off) 72'
LWB	3	(Germany) Thorsten Legat
CM	6	(Switzerland) Murat Yakin
CM	23	(Germany) Gerhard Poschner
AM	10	(Bulgaria) Krasimir Balakov
CF	11	(Germany) Fredi Bobic (c)
CF	27	(Nigeria) Jonathan Akpoborie		(substituted off) 80'
Substitutes:
GK	25	(Germany) Marc Ziegler
DF	21	(Germany) Jochen Endreß
MF	12	(Germany) Danny Schwarz
MF	16	(Federal Republic of Yugoslavia) Kristijan Đorđević		(substituted on) 72'
MF	22	(Hungary) Krisztián Lisztes
FW	9	(Federal Republic of Yugoslavia) Sreto Ristić
FW	15	(Germany) Matthias Becker		(substituted on) 80'
Manager:
(Germany) Joachim Löw
