= Alexander Zickler =

German footballer (born 1974)

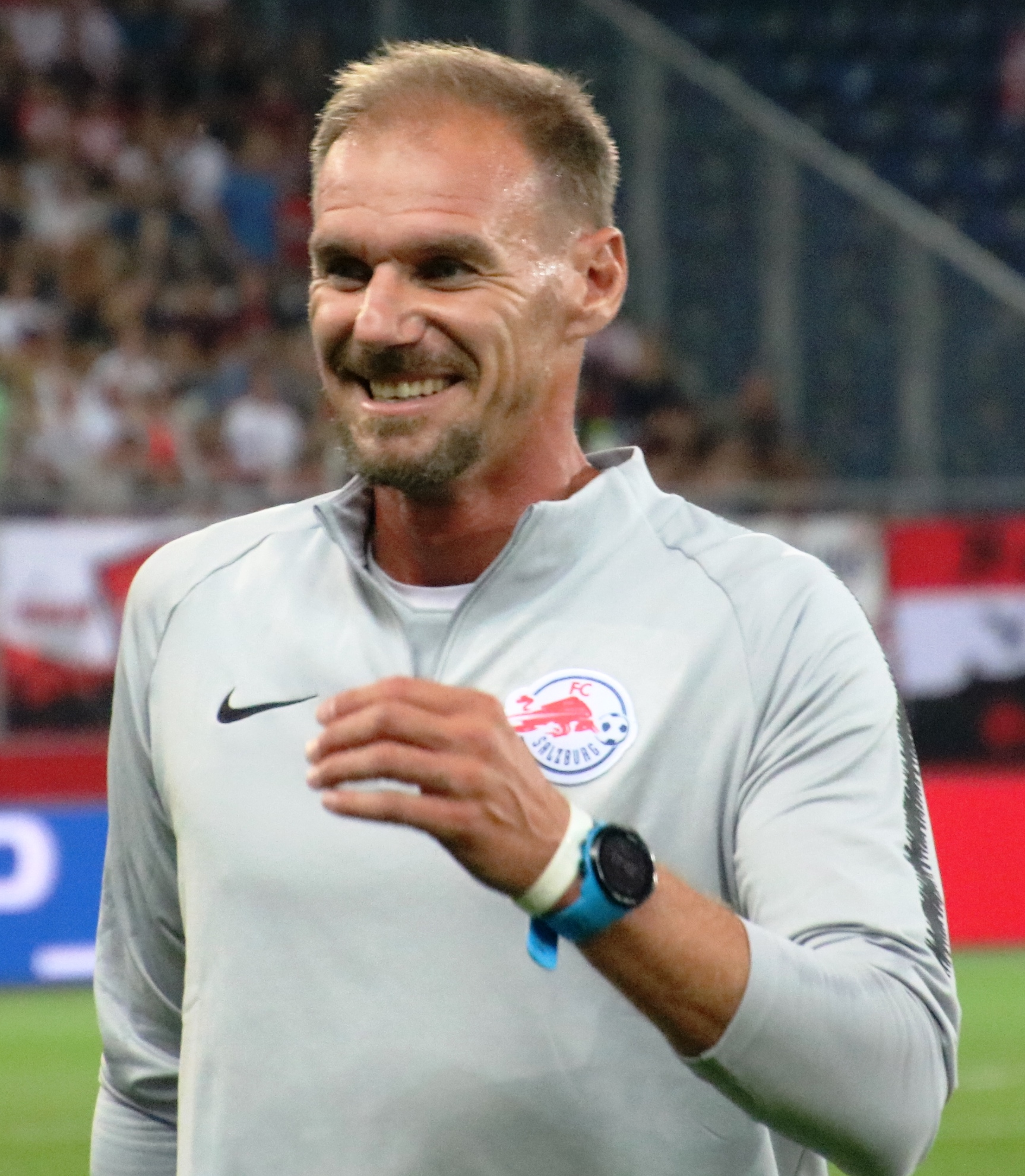
- Zickler in 2018

Personal information
- Date of birth: 28 February 1974 (age 52)
- Place of birth: Bad Salzungen, East Germany
- Height: 1.88 m (6 ft 2 in)
- Position: Striker

Team information
- Current team: Al Shabab (assistant manager)

Youth career
- 1980–1992: Dynamo Dresden

Senior career*
Years	Team	Apps	(Gls)
1992–1993	Dynamo Dresden	18	(3)
1993–1995	Bayern Munich (A)	21	(6)
1993–2005	Bayern Munich	214	(51)
2005–2010	Red Bull Salzburg	137	(56)
2010–2011	LASK	15	(1)
2012	ASV Taxham	0	(0)
Total		405	(117)

International career
1993–1996	Germany U21	17	(7)
1998–2002	Germany	12	(2)
- * Club domestic league appearances and goals

Alexander Zickler (born 28 February 1974) is a German professional football coach and a former player who played as a striker. He is currently assistant manager for Al Shabab.

He spent 12 years of his professional career with Bayern Munich, appearing in more than 300 official games and winning 19 major titles, notably seven Bundesliga championships and the 2001 Champions League. He also played six years in Austria with two clubs.

Zickler was a German international for four years, but did not attend any major international tournament.

== Club career ==
=== Dynamo Dresden ===
Born in Bad Salzungen, East Germany, Zickler began his career with Dynamo Dresden, having joined the club's youth system in 1980 as a six-year-old.

In the 1992–93 season, he played with the first team in the Bundesliga, making his debut in the competition on 23 October 1992 in a 1–2 home loss against 1. FC Nürnberg and eventually helping them narrowly avoid relegation.

=== Bayern Munich ===
In July 1993, Zickler transferred to Bayern Munich for €1,187,300, initially playing with the reserves. From his second season onwards he became a first-team regular, helping the Bavarians capture seven German championships and four German cups, adding the 1996 UEFA Europa League (eight games and two assists from the player during the campaign).

Zickler played in 24 league games – scoring three goals – in 2000–01 as Bayern won the league. In the campaign's UEFA Champions League final, against Valencia, he entered the game as a substitute and successfully converted his penalty kick in the shootout, which ended in win. During his time in the top flight, he broke the record as the highest goal-scoring substitute of all time, scoring 18 times in 102 appearances off the bench; however, his career was often hampered by injuries and medical conditions: in 2002, he had surgery to remove a tumor from his right shin bone which caused him to miss out on participation in the 2002 FIFA World Cup. One year later, he was again hospitalized with a break in his previously operated leg, followed by another shin break only a few days before the start of 2003–04.

Shortly before his return into Bayern's first team, Zickler broke his shin for the third time while playing with Bayern Munich II.

=== Austria ===
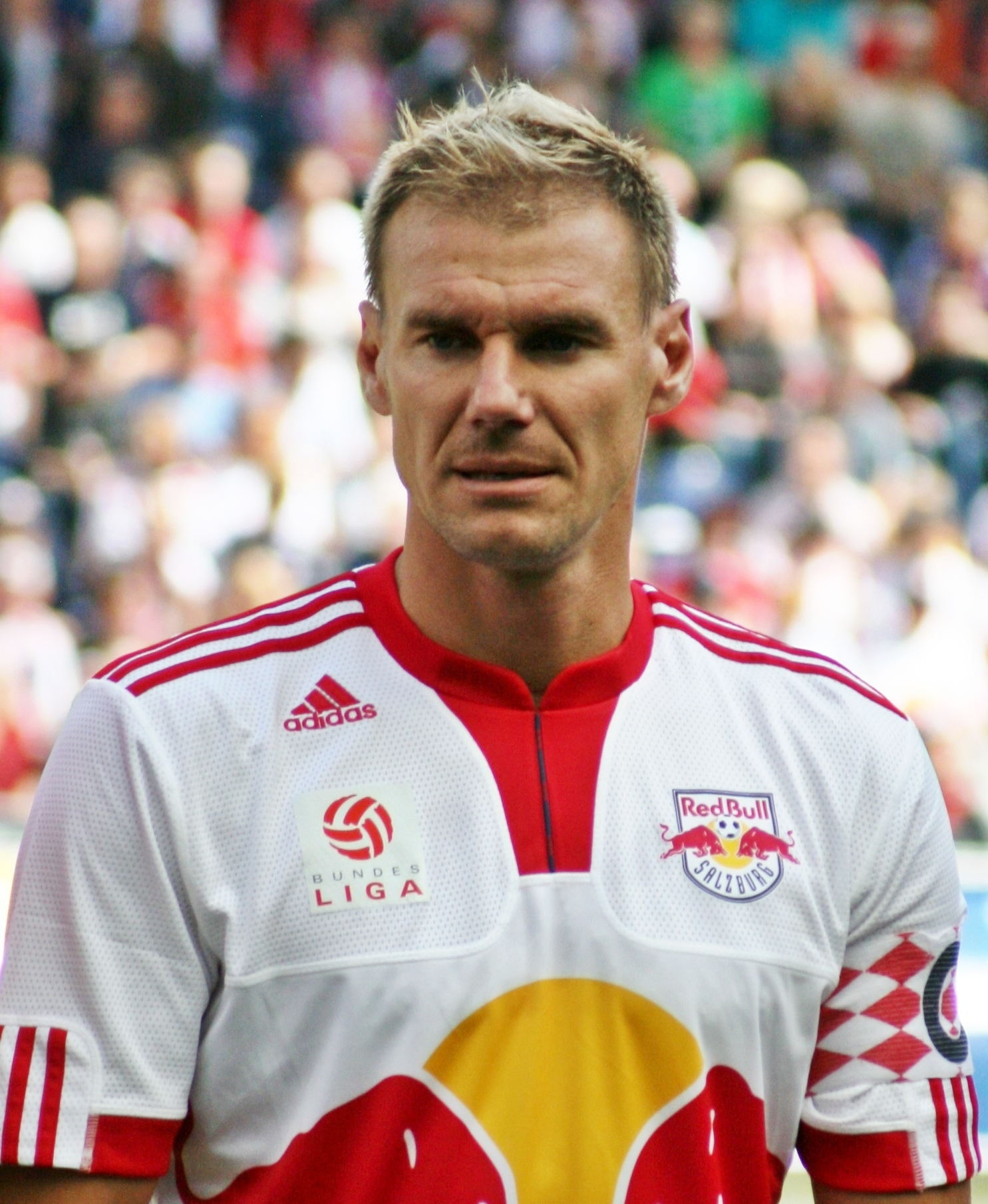
Zickler with Salzburg in 2009

In June 2005, Zickler tried his chances at Austrian Bundesliga's Red Bull Salzburg, signing on a "performance-related" deal alongside former Bayern teammate Thomas Linke. In his first season, he helped the club to the second position, adding nine goals in 31 matches.

In the 2006–07 campaign, in the return leg of the Champions League second qualifying round, Zickler scored through a penalty to give the Red Bulls a 2–0 victory over Zürich and advance them into the next stage, where they lost to Valencia. On 30 November 2006, he was voted the APA Footballer of the Year by the league's managers, and finished the domestic campaign with 22 goals (a competition best), being instrumental, with Linke, in the side's national league conquest.

In the 2010 off-season, Zickler joined fellow league club LASK as a free agent. He made his debut on 21 August, replacing Florian Hart in the 61st minute in a 0–2 away defeat against Wacker.

On 25 September 2010, Zickler scored his first and only goal for LASK, in a 3–3 draw at SV Mattersburg. He retired from football at the end of 2010–11 aged 37, as his team also suffered relegation.

== International career ==
Zickler was capped 12 times for Germany. He made his debut on 18 November 1998, coming on as a substitute for Mario Basler in a 1–1 draw against Netherlands. On 16 August 2000, he scored his first international goal(s), netting twice in a 4–1 friendly victory over Spain, in Hannover.

Zickler made his final appearance for the national team on 11 October 2002 in a 1–1 away friendly draw against Bosnia and Herzegovina, retiring from international football later in that year.

=== International goals ===
Scores and results list Germany's goal tally first.

#	Date	Venue	Opponent	Score	Result	Competition
1.	16 August 2000	AWD-Arena, Hannover	Spain	3–0	4–1	Friendly
2.	16 August 2000	AWD-Arena, Hannover	Spain	4–0	4–1	Friendly

== Honours ==
=== Club ===
Bayern Munich

- Bundesliga: 1993–94, 1996–97, 1998–99, 1999–2000, 2000–01, 2002–03, 2004–05
- DFB-Pokal: 1997–98, 1999–2000, 2002–03, 2004–05; Runner-up 1998–99
- DFB-Ligapokal: 1997, 1998, 1999, 2000, 2004
- UEFA Champions League: 2000–01
- UEFA Cup: 1995–96
- Intercontinental Cup: 2001

Red Bull Salzburg

- Austrian Football Bundesliga: 2006–07, 2008–09, 2009–10

=== Individual ===
- Austrian Football Bundesliga: Topscorer 2006–07, 2007–08
- Austrian Footballer of the Year: 2005–06
- Austrian Footballers Association Player of the Year: 2006–07
