= 2004 DFB-Ligapokal =

- Tournament programme cover

Tournament details
- Country: Germany
- Teams: 6

Final positions
- Champions: Bayern Munich
- Runners-up: Werder Bremen

Tournament statistics
- Matches played: 5
- Goals scored: 15 (3 per match)
- Top goal scorer(s): Michael Ballack; Cacau; Sebastian Deisler; Ivan Klasnić (2)

The 2004 DFB-Ligapokal was the eighth edition of the DFB-Ligapokal. Bayern Munich won their fifth title, beating Werder Bremen 3–2 in the final.

== Participating clubs ==
A total of six teams qualified for the competition. The labels in the parentheses show how each team qualified for the place of its starting round:

- 1st, 2nd, 3rd, 4th, etc.: League position
- CW: Cup winners

Semi-finals
Werder Bremen (1st + CW)	Bayern Munich (2nd)
Preliminary round
Bayer Leverkusen (3rd)	VfL Bochum (5th)
VfB Stuttgart (4th)	Hansa Rostock (9th) (Note: The 9th placed team of the 2003–04 Bundesliga, Hansa Rostock, qualified as teams from 6th to 8th (Borussia Dortmund, Schalke 04, and Hamburger SV) were involved in the 2004 UEFA Intertoto Cup during the same period.)

== Matches ==
=== Preliminary round ===
21 July 2004
20:00

Bayer Leverkusen	1–1	Hansa Rostock
Callsen-Bracker 13'	Report	Dum 8' (o.g.)
Penalties
Freier (penalty scored); Voronin (penalty missed); Callsen-Bracker (penalty scored); França (penalty scored); Krzynowek (penalty scored)	4–3	(penalty missed) Rydlewicz; (penalty scored) Persson; (penalty scored) Lapaczinski; (penalty missed) Möhrle; (penalty scored) Rasmussen

Ernst-Abbe-Sportfeld, Jena
Attendance: 10,000
Referee: Stefan Trautmann

22 July 2004
18:00

VfB Stuttgart	3–0	VfL Bochum
Cacau 5', 34'; Szabics 84'	Report

Städtisches Waldstadion, Aalen
Attendance: 11,000
Referee: Peter Gagelmann

=== Semi-finals ===
28 July 2004
20:30

Bayern Munich	3–0	Bayer Leverkusen
Zé Roberto 5'; Ballack 65'; Frings 89'	Report

Lohrheidestadion, Bochum
Attendance: 10,100
Referee: Florian Meyer

29 July 2004
20:30

Werder Bremen	2–0	VfB Stuttgart
Klasnić 30'; Valdez 86'	Report

Emslandstadion, Meppen
Attendance: 12,900
Referee: Helmut Fleischer

=== Final ===
2 August 2004
18:00 CEST

Bayern Munich	3–2	Werder Bremen
Deisler 27', 43'; Ballack 65'	Report	Klasnić 68'; Ismaël 74'

Bruchwegstadion, Mainz
Attendance: 13,000
Referee: Lutz Michael Fröhlich (Berlin)

== See also ==
- 2004–05 Bundesliga
- 2004–05 DFB-Pokal
