= Michael Tarnat =

German footballer (born 1969)

Personal information
- Date of birth: 27 October 1969 (age 57)
- Place of birth: Hilden, West Germany
- Height: 1.86 m (6 ft 1 in)
- Position: Left wing-back

Team information
- Current team: Bayern Munich (leader of U12–U16 youths)

Youth career
- 1979–1990: SV Hilden-Nord

Senior career*
| Years | Team | Apps | (Gls) |
| 1990–1994 | MSV Duisburg | 134 | (12) |
| 1994–1997 | Karlsruher SC | 81 | (7) |
| 1997–2003 | Bayern Munich | 122 | (8) |
| 2003–2004 | Manchester City | 32 | (3) |
| 2004–2009 | Hannover 96 | 102 | (8) |
| Total | | 471 | (38) |

International career
| 1996–1998 | Germany | 19 | (0) |
- * Club domestic league appearances and goals

Michael Tarnat (born 27 October 1969) is a German former professional footballer, currently employed by Bayern Munich as the leader of the U12–U16 youth teams. A left-footed full-back, he was also employed as a left wingback and occasionally as a defensive midfielder. His nickname is "Tanne", meaning "fir" in English. He ended his career with Hannover 96, having previously played for MSV Duisburg, Karlsruher SC, Bayern Munich and Manchester City. A veteran of 19 caps for Germany, Tarnat also participated in the 1998 FIFA World Cup. He is renowned for his powerful free kicks and similar long-shots with his strong left foot.

== Club career ==
=== Early years ===
Born in Hilden, Tarnat started to play football at the club SV Hilden-Nord before starting his professional career in 1990 when he joined MSV Duisburg. He made his Bundesliga debut on 2 August 1991 in Duisburg's home match against VfB Stuttgart and went on to make 58 appearances for the club in the league in the following two seasons, also scoring his first Bundesliga goal in Duisburg's 1–1 draw away against VfB Leipzig on 27 August 1993. He moved to Karlsruher SC in the summer of 1994 and grew into one of the team's stars, alongside Thomas Häßler and Thorsten Fink. His trademark was his super-hard left-footed shot, which made him one of the best free-kick takers of his Bundesliga generation. In three seasons with KSC, Tarnat made 81 Bundesliga appearances and scored seven goals for the club in the league. In 1996, he was called up into the Germany national team for the first time and made his international debut in Germany's 1998 World Cup qualifier against Armenia on 9 October 1996.

=== Bayern Munich ===
In 1997, he got his big break when Bayern Munich bought him along with Fink. He played well on his left flank, good enough to give star left full-back Bixente Lizarazu almost a full season on the bench. In the following seasons, trainer Ottmar Hitzfeld would often play them both, giving Bayern one of the best left flanks in Europe. Tarnat's Bayern career was extremely successful. He was German champion in 1999, 2000, 2001 and 2003, won the DFB-Pokal in 1998, 2000 and 2003 and the UEFA Champions League in 2001. Tarnat also played in the 1999 UEFA Champions League Final in which Bayern lost 2–1 to Manchester United with two stoppage-time goals.

In Bayern Munich's away match against Eintracht Frankfurt in the 1999–2000 Bundesliga season, Tarnat memorably played half an hour in the second half as a goalkeeper. In the match, Oliver Kahn was forced to leave the pitch after sustaining an injury in collision with teammate Samuel Kuffour and his replacement Bernd Dreher was also injured after he spent less than ten minutes on the pitch, allowing Tarnat to come off the bench to take his place between the sticks. Very remarkably, Bayern had trailed 0–1, but scored the equaliser only two minutes after Tarnat entered the match and eventually managed to win 2–1 after Kuffour scored the winning goal in the 80th minute.

=== Manchester City and Hannover 96 ===
In the late years, however, Tarnat became somewhat injury-prone, which effectively ended his international career in 1998 after 19 caps and caused Bayern to bench him often. In six seasons of playing for Bayern, Tarnat made 122 Bundesliga appearances and scored eight goals for the club in the league. He made a move to Manchester City in 2003, making 32 Premier League appearances and scoring three goals for the club in the league before returning to Germany by signing with Hannover 96 a year later, where he played for the rest of his career. On 17 May 2009, it was announced that he would retire from professional football. He played his last game for Hannover on 29 July 2009 vs Arsenal. In August 2009, Tarnat returned to FC Bayern Munich as a talent scout.

== International career ==
He was also a regular in the Germany national team at the 1998 World Cup finals in France, appearing in four out of five matches played by the team at the tournament before they were surprisingly eliminated by Croatia in the quarterfinals. In the group game against Yugoslavia, his free kick led to Siniša Mihajlović scoring an own goal.

== Personal life ==
Tarnat's son Niklas Tarnat is also a professional footballer, currently playing for TSV 1860 Munich.

== Career statistics ==
=== Club ===
Appearances and goals by club, season and competition
| Club | Season | League | | |
| Club | Season | Division | Apps | Goals |
|---|---|---|---|---|
| Duisburg | 1990–91 | 2. Bundesliga | 33 | 4 |
| Duisburg | 1991–92 | Bundesliga | 34 | 0 |
| Duisburg | 1992–93 | 2. Bundesliga | 43 | 7 |
| Duisburg | 1993–94 | Bundesliga | 24 | 1 |
| Duisburg | Total | | 134 | 12 |
| Karlsruhe | 1994–95 | Bundesliga | 24 | 3 |
| Karlsruhe | 1995–96 | Bundesliga | 30 | 2 |
| Karlsruhe | 1996–97 | Bundesliga | 27 | 2 |
| Karlsruhe | Total | | 81 | 7 |
| Bayern Munich | 1997–98 | Bundesliga | 32 | 5 |
| Bayern Munich | 1998–99 | Bundesliga | 20 | 1 |
| Bayern Munich | 1999–00 | Bundesliga | 26 | 1 |
| Bayern Munich | 2000–01 | Bundesliga | 23 | 1 |
| Bayern Munich | 2001–02 | Bundesliga | 10 | 0 |
| Bayern Munich | 2002–03 | Bundesliga | 11 | 0 |
| Bayern Munich | Total | | 122 | 8 |
| Manchester City | 2003–04 | Premier League | 32 | 3 |
| Hannover | 2004–05 | Bundesliga | 22 | 2 |
| Hannover | 2005–06 | Bundesliga | 29 | 4 |
| Hannover | 2006–07 | Bundesliga | 28 | 1 |
| Hannover | 2007–08 | Bundesliga | 16 | 1 |
| Hannover | 2008–09 | Bundesliga | 7 | 0 |
| Hannover | Total | | 102 | 8 |
| Career total | | | 471 | 38 |

=== International ===
Appearances and goals by national team and year
| National team | Year | Apps | Goals |
|---|---|---|---|
| Germany | 1996 | 3 | 0 |
| Germany | 1997 | 4 | 0 |
| Germany | 1998 | 12 | 0 |
| Total | | 19 | 0 |

== Honours ==
Karlsruher SC

- DFB-Pokal runner-up: 1995–96

Bayern Munich

- Bundesliga: 1998–99, 1999–2000, 2000–01, 2002–03
- DFB-Pokal: 1997–98, 1999–2000, 2002–03
- DFB Liga-Pokal: 1997, 1998, 1999, 2000
- UEFA Champions League: 2000–01
- FIFA Intercontinental Cup: 2001
