= 2000 DFB-Ligapokal =

- Tournament programme cover

Tournament details
- Country: Germany
- Teams: 6

Final positions
- Champions: Bayern Munich
- Runners-up: Hertha BSC

Tournament statistics
- Matches played: 5
- Goals scored: 19 (3.8 per match)
- Top goal scorer: Alexander Zickler (3)

The 2000 DFB-Ligapokal was the fourth edition of the DFB-Ligapokal. Bayern Munich won the competition for the fourth consecutive year, beating Hertha BSC 5–1 in the final.

== Participating clubs ==
A total of six teams qualified for the competition. The labels in the parentheses show how each team qualified for the place of its starting round:

- 1st, 2nd, 3rd, 4th, etc.: League position
- CW: Cup winners
- TH: Title holders

Semi-finals
Bayern Munich^{TH} (1st + CW)	Bayer Leverkusen (2nd)
Preliminary round
Hamburger SV (3rd)	1. FC Kaiserslautern (5th)
1860 Munich (4th)	Hertha BSC (6th)

== Matches ==
=== Preliminary round ===
24 July 2000

Hamburger SV	1–3	Hertha BSC
Butt 7' (pen.)	Report	Alves 36'; Beinlich 61'; Dárdai 67'

Lohmühle, Lübeck
Attendance: 10,500
Referee: Bernd Heynemann

27 July 2000

1860 München	0–2	1. FC Kaiserslautern
	Report	Tare 8'; Strasser 23'

Südweststadion, Ludwigshafen
Attendance: 9,000
Referee: Alfons Berg

=== Semi-finals ===
29 July 2000

Bayer Leverkusen	1–1	Hertha BSC
Kirsten 44'	Report	Preetz 89'
Penalties
Greško (penalty scored); Reeb (penalty scored); Rink (penalty scored); Neuendorf (penalty scored); Hoffmann (penalty missed)	4–5	(penalty scored) Reiss; (penalty scored) Beinlich; (penalty scored) Preetz; (penalty scored) Király; (penalty scored) Deisler

Paul Greifzu Stadium, Dessau
Attendance: 16,100
Referee: Burkard Hufgard

30 July 2000

Bayern Munich	4–1	1. FC Kaiserslautern
Jancker 5'; Scholl 31'; Wiesinger 48'; Santa Cruz 78'	Report	Buck 33'

Rosenaustadion, Augsburg
Attendance: 13,500
Referee: Rainer Werther

=== Final ===
1 August 2000
20:30 CEST

Hertha BSC	1–5	Bayern Munich
Michalke 61'	Report	Zickler 50', 66', 85'; Jancker 53'; Sverrisson 57' (o.g.)

BayArena, Leverkusen
Attendance: 12,500
Referee: Hellmut Krug (Gelsenkirchen)

== See also ==
- 2000–01 Bundesliga
- 2000–01 DFB-Pokal
