= Bernd Dreher =

German footballer (born 1966)

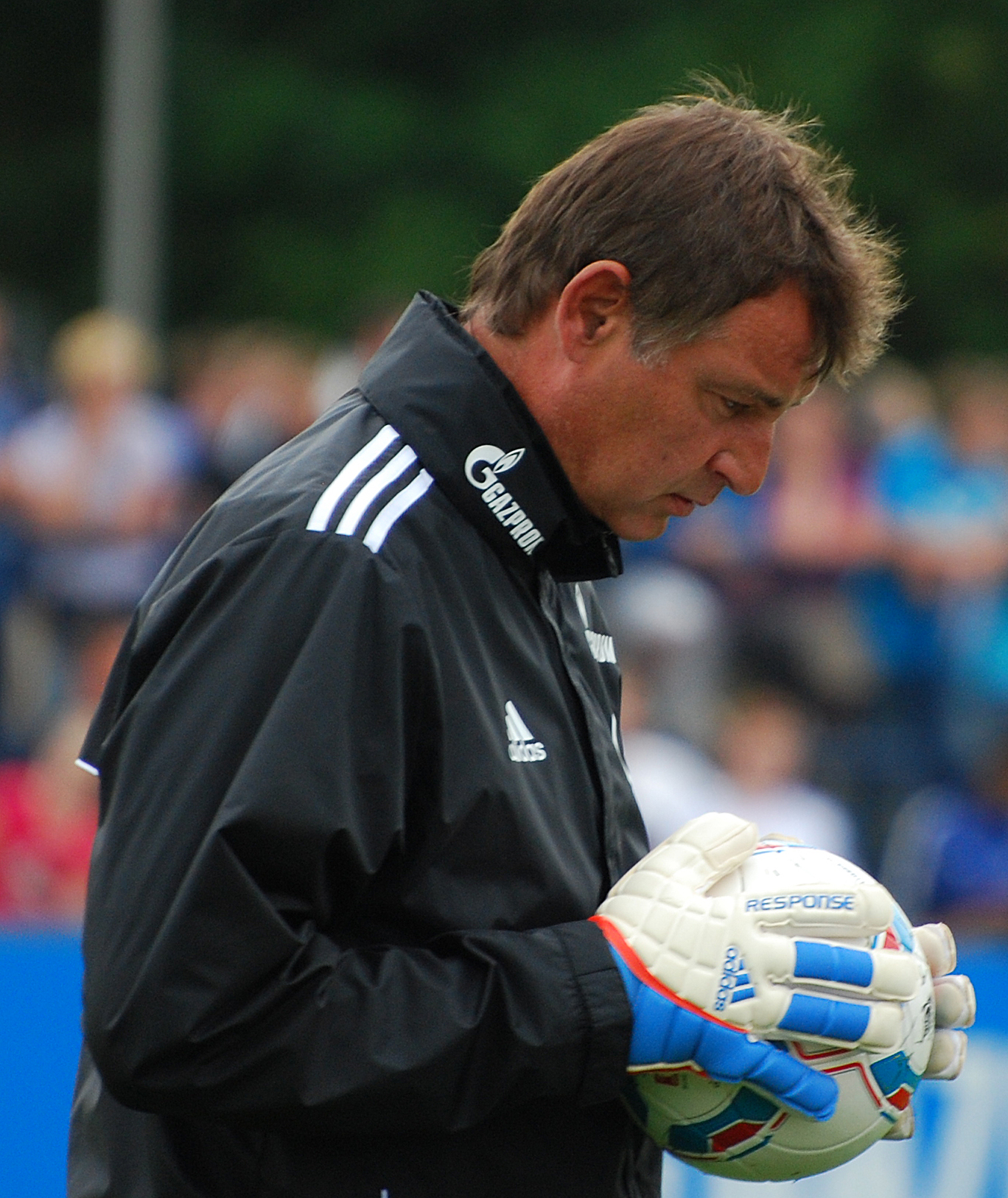
- Dreher in 2011

Personal information
- Date of birth: 2 November 1966 (age 59)
- Place of birth: Leverkusen, West Germany
- Height: 1.87 m (6 ft 2 in)
- Position: Goalkeeper

Youth career
- 1972–1976: SV Schlebusch
- 1976–1986: Bayer Leverkusen

Senior career*
Years	Team	Apps	(Gls)
1986–1990	Bayer Leverkusen	9	(0)
1990–1996	Bayer Uerdingen	201	(0)
1996–2003	Bayern Munich	11	(0)
2005–2008	Bayern Munich	2	(0)
Total		223	(0)

Managerial career
- 2003–2008: Bayern Munich (goalkeeper coach)
- 2009–2012: Schalke 04 (goalkeeper coach)
- 2015: Austria Salzburg (goalkeeper coach)
- 2015–2016: Reutlingen 05 (goalkeeper coach)
- 2017–2018: Ludogorets Razgrad (goalkeeper coach)
- * Club domestic league appearances and goals

Bernd Dreher (born 2 November 1966) is a German former professional football player, who played as a goalkeeper, and a current goalkeeper coach. He last worked at Ludogorets Razgrad.

== Career ==
Dreher originally retired in summer 2003, taking up the role of Bayern Munich youth goalkeeping coach and lending a hand to senior counterpart Sepp Maier in his efforts to keep Oliver Kahn and Michael Rensing in peak form. "I'm actually training more now than when I was a full professional," commented Dreher after taking part in practically every pre-season workout and tending one goal for the first team in practice matches and friendlies. For the 2005–06 season campaign, Dreher was summoned out of "semi-retirement" and handed a new, one-year pro contract. "We've officially reactivated him. He's in such good shape, I'd have no hesitation picking him in any situation," coach Felix Magath said in praise of his new number three keeper, who became the oldest active player in the Bundesliga. Dreher was in goal for Bayern for one game in the 2005–06 season, keeping a clean sheet against Wolfsburg. He played his final match in a win against Mainz 05 on 19 May 2007, and at 40 years and 198 days, is the sixth-oldest player in Bundesliga history as of the 2019–20 season.

== Honours ==
Bayer Leverkusen

- UEFA Cup: 1987–88

Bayern Munich

- Bundesliga: 1996–97, 1998–99, 1999–2000, 2000–01, 2002–03, 2005–06, 2007–08
- DFB-Pokal: 1997–98, 1999–2000, 2002–03, 2005–06, 2007–08
- DFB-Ligapokal: 1997, 1998, 1999, 2000, 2007
- UEFA Champions League: 2000–01
- Intercontinental Cup: 2001
