= 1998 DFB-Ligapokal =

- Tournament programme cover

Tournament details
- Country: Germany
- Teams: 6

Final positions
- Champions: Bayern Munich
- Runners-up: VfB Stuttgart

Tournament statistics
- Matches played: 5
- Goals scored: 16 (3.2 per match)
- Top goal scorer: Giovane Élber (3)

The 1998 DFB-Ligapokal was the second edition of the DFB-Ligapokal. In a repeat of last year's competition, Bayern Munich beat VfB Stuttgart in the final.

== Participating clubs ==
A total of six teams qualified for the competition. The labels in the parentheses show how each team qualified for the place of its starting round:

- 1st, 2nd, 3rd, 4th, etc.: League position
- CW: Cup winners
- TH: Title holders

Semi-finals
1. FC Kaiserslautern (1st)	Bayern Munich^{TH} (CW + 2nd)
Preliminary round
Bayer Leverkusen (3rd)	Schalke 04 (5th)
VfB Stuttgart (4th)	MSV Duisburg (8th) (Note: The 8th placed team of the 1997–98 Bundesliga, MSV Duisburg, qualified as teams in 6th and 7th (Hansa Rostock and Werder Bremen) were involved in the 1998 UEFA Intertoto Cup during the same period.)

== Matches ==
=== Preliminary round ===
31 July 1998

Bayer Leverkusen	3–0	MSV Duisburg
Beinlich 13'; Kirsten 46'; Rink 64'	Report

Nattenberg Stadion, Lüdenscheid
Attendance: 3,500
Referee: Markus Merk

1 August 1998

VfB Stuttgart	2–1	Schalke 04
Akpoborie 48'; Poschner 78'	Report	Büskens 16'

Stadion Oberwerth, Koblenz
Attendance: 5,500
Referee: Hartmut Strampe

=== Semi-finals ===
3 August 1998

Bayer Leverkusen	0–1	Bayern Munich
	Report	Basler 30'

Erzgebirgsstadion, Aue
Attendance: 20,000
Referee: Bernd Heynemann

4 August 1998

VfB Stuttgart	3–2	1. FC Kaiserslautern
Balakov 18' (pen.); Poschner 78'; Bobic 87'	Report	Marschall 8', 53' (pen.)

Südweststadion, Ludwigshafen
Attendance: 16,000
Referee: Lutz Wagner

=== Final ===
8 August 1998
19:00 CEST

Bayern Munich	4–0	VfB Stuttgart
Élber 4', 25', 41'; Jancker 89'	Report

BayArena, Leverkusen
Attendance: 14,000
Referee: Lutz Michael Fröhlich (Berlin)

== See also ==
- 1998–99 Bundesliga
- 1998–99 DFB-Pokal
