= 1997 DFB-Ligapokal =

- Tournament programme cover

Tournament details
- Country: Germany
- Teams: 6

Final positions
- Champions: Bayern Munich
- Runners-up: VfB Stuttgart

Tournament statistics
- Matches played: 5
- Goals scored: 12 (2.4 per match)
- Top goal scorer: Giovane Élber (2)

The 1997 DFB-Ligapokal was the inaugural DFB-Ligapokal, a pre-season competition in Germany. The Ligapokal was an extended Supercup, including the reigning League champions, Cup winners, plus the next four highest placed teams in the previous season's Bundesliga. It was won by Bayern Munich, the 1996–97 Bundesliga champions, who beat 1996–97 DFB-Pokal winners VfB Stuttgart in the final.

== Participating clubs ==
A total of six teams qualified for the competition. The labels in the parentheses show how each team qualified for the place of its starting round:

- 1st, 2nd, 3rd, 4th, etc.: League position
- CW: Cup winners

Semi-finals
Bayern Munich (1st)	VfB Stuttgart (CW + 4th)
Preliminary round
Bayer Leverkusen (2nd)	VfL Bochum (5th)
Borussia Dortmund (3rd)	Karlsruher SC (6th)

== Matches ==
=== Preliminary round ===
18 July 1997
17:45

Karlsruher SC	2–2	Bayer Leverkusen
Reich 6'; Dundee 81'	Report	Beinlich 5'; Kirsten 21'
Penalties
Häßler (penalty scored); Régis (penalty missed); Reich (penalty scored); Keller (penalty missed); Dundee (penalty scored); Hengen (penalty scored); Gilewicz (penalty scored); Nyarko (penalty scored)	6–5	(penalty missed) N. Kovač; (penalty scored) Kirsten; (penalty scored) Heintze; (penalty scored) Rydlewicz; (penalty missed) Neuendorf; (penalty scored) Beinlich; (penalty scored) Happe; (penalty missed) Ramelow

Erzgebirgsstadion, Aue
Attendance: 6,000
Referee: Michael Prengel

20 July 1997
20:30

Borussia Dortmund	1–0	VfL Bochum
Chapuisat 62' (pen.)	Report

Stadion Oberwerth, Koblenz
Attendance: 13,000
Referee: Hans-Peter Best

=== Semi-finals ===
22 July 1997
19:00

VfB Stuttgart	3–0	Karlsruher SC
Hagner 11'; Balakov 28'; Soldo 64'	Report

Stadion an der Bremer Brücke, Osnabrück
Attendance: 10,000
Referee: Lutz Michael Fröhlich

23 July 1997
19:00

Bayern Munich	2–0	Borussia Dortmund
Giovane Élber 29'; Babbel 75'	Report

Rosenaustadion, Augsburg
Attendance: 25,000
Referee: Lutz Wagner

=== Final ===
26 July 1997
19:30 CEST

Bayern Munich	2–0	VfB Stuttgart
Basler 57'; Élber 71'	Report

Ulrich-Haberland-Stadion, Leverkusen
Attendance: 15,000
Referee: Jürgen Jansen (Essen)

== See also ==
- 1997–98 Bundesliga
- 1997–98 DFB-Pokal
