= 2002–03 FC Bayern Munich season =

103rd season in existence of Bayern Munich

Bayern Munich
2002–03 season
- Manager: Ottmar Hitzfeld
- Stadium: Olympiastadion
- Bundesliga: 1st
- DFB-Pokal: Winners
- DFB-Ligapokal: Preliminary round
- UEFA Champions League: First group stage
- Top goalscorer: League: Giovane Élber (21); All: Giovane Élber (31)
Home colours	Away colours	Third colours

Bayern Munich won the Bundesliga and the German domestic cup, following a season without trophies in the year before. Despite the 16-point margin to the second-placed VfB Stuttgart in the Bundesliga, the season was not regarded as a complete success due to a humiliating run in the UEFA Champions League, where the club earned only two points from six matches. Even though it arguably had the toughest group of all, with Milan, Deportivo La Coruña and Lens as opponents, early elimination was still not expected with signings such as Michael Ballack, Zé Roberto and Sebastian Deisler, and incumbents such as the 2002 FIFA World Cup's player of the tournament Oliver Kahn in the squad.

This was the first season to have T-Mobile as the club's shirt sponsor, replacing previous sponsor Opel.

== Results ==
=== Friendlies ===
==== Trofeo Santiago Bernabéu ====
3 August Semi-finals	Bayern Munich	2–1	Milan	Madrid, Spain
	Tarnat 21'; Scholl 73'		Inzaghi 9'	Stadium: Santiago Bernabéu Stadium

4 August Final	Real Madrid	1–2	Bayern Munich	Madrid, Spain
	Figo 82' (pen.)		Ballack 27' (pen.); Salihamidžić 64'	Stadium: Santiago Bernabéu Stadium; Referee: Fernández Marín

=== Bundesliga ===
==== League results ====
Match	Date	Ground	Opponent	Score^{1}	Pos.	Pts.	GD	Report
1	10 August	A	Borussia Mönchengladbach	0 – 0	12	1	0	Report / Report link; Kick off / 15:30 CEST; Attendance / 34,500 (sell-out); Referee / Hellmut Krug; Borussia Mönchengladbach / Bayern Munich; Korell (yellow card) / Linke (yellow card)
2	17 August	H	Arminia Bielefeld	6 – 2	4	4	4	Report / Report link; Kick off / 15:30 CEST; Attendance / 60,000; Referee / Peter Gagelmann; Bayern Munich / Arminia Bielefeld; Élber 18', 41', 65', 85'; Ballack 26'; Pizarro 81' / Wichniarek 51'; Diabang 89'; Bogusz (yellow card); Dabrowski (yellow card)
3	24 August	A	Hamburger SV	3 – 0	3	7	7	Report / Report link; Kick off / 15:30 CEST; Attendance / 55,516 (sell-out); Referee / Lutz Michael Fröhlich; Hamburger SV / Bayern Munich; Hoogma (yellow card); Hollerbach (yellow card); Meijer (yellow card) / Pizarro 25', 85'; Zickler 90+1'; Ballack (yellow card)
4	10 September	H	1860 Munich	3 – 1	2	10	9	Report / Report link; Kick off / 20:00 CEST; Attendance / 69,000 (sell-out); Referee / Jürgen Aust; Bayern Munich / 1860 Munich; Salihamidžić 41' (yellow card); Pizarro 52'; Élber 76' (yellow card); Lizarazu (yellow card); Linke (yellow card) / Max 14' (yellow card); Meyer (yellow card); Riseth (yellow card); Pürk (yellow card)
5	14 September	A	1. FC Nürnberg	2 – 1	1	13	10	Report / Report link; Kick off / 15:30 CEST; Attendance / 44,767 (sell-out); Referee / Markus Merk; 1. FC Nürnberg / Bayern Munich; Ćirić 36' (pen.); Cacau (yellow card) / Ballack 12', 53'; Jeremies (yellow card); Salihamidžić (yellow card)
6	21 September	H	Energie Cottbus	3 – 1	1	16	12	Report / Report link; Kick off / 15:30 CEST; Attendance / 43,000; Referee / Thorsten Kinhöfer; Bayern Munich / Energie Cottbus; Zickler 45+1'; Ballack 47'; Élber 76' / Rink 19'; Beeck (yellow card); Akrapović (yellow card); Kałużny (yellow card)
7	28 September	A	Bayer Leverkusen	1 – 2	1	16	11	Report / Report link; Kick off / 15:30 CEST; Attendance / 22,500 (sell-out); Referee / Hellmut Krug; Bayer Leverkusen / Bayern Munich; Lúcio 8'; Brdarić (yellow card) 37' (red card); Bierofka 63'; Živković (yellow card); Schneider (yellow card); Ojigwe (yellow card) / Salihamidžić 89'; Jeremies (yellow card); Kahn (yellow card); R. Kovač (yellow card); Ballack (yellow card); N. Kovač (yellow card)
8	5 October	H	VfL Bochum	4 – 1	1	19	14	Report / Report link; Kick off / 15:30 CEST; Attendance / 63,000 (sell-out); Referee / Herbert Fandel; Bayern Munich / VfL Bochum; Élber 27', 90'; Pizarro 39', 66' / Schindzielorz 77'; Bemben (yellow card); Tapalović (yellow card)
9	19 October	A	Hansa Rostock	1 – 0	1	22	15	Report / Report link; Kick off / 15:30 CEST; Attendance / 30,000 (sell-out); Referee / Michael Weiner; Hansa Rostock / Bayern Munich; / Zé Roberto 73'; Sagnol (yellow card); Élber (yellow card); Ballack (yellow card); Scholl (yellow card)
10	26 October	H	Hannover 96	3 – 3	1	23	15	Report / Report link; Kick off / 15:30 CEST; Attendance / 52,000; Referee / Torsten Koop; Bayern Munich / Hannover 96; Élber 4', 80'; Scholl 75'; Jeremies (yellow card) / Żuraw 16'; Stendel 44'; Kuffour 82' (o.g.); Bobic (yellow card); Lala (yellow card)
11	3 November	A	Werder Bremen	0 – 2	1	23	13	Report / Report link; Kick off / 17:30 CET; Attendance / 40,200 (sell-out); Referee / Hellmut Krug; Werder Bremen / Bayern Munich; Daun 17'; Krstajić 80' / Fink (yellow card)
12	9 November	H	Borussia Dortmund	2 – 1	1	26	14	Report / Report link; Kick off / 15:30 CET; Attendance / 63,000 (sell-out); Referee / Michael Weiner; Bayern Munich / Borussia Dortmund; Santa Cruz 62'; Pizarro 66'; Élber (yellow card) / Koller 7' (yellow card); Frings (yellow card) 41' (red card); Lehmann (yellow card) 66' (red card); Dedê (yellow card); Kehl (yellow card)
13	16 November	H	VfL Wolfsburg	1 – 0	1	29	15	Report / Report link; Kick off / 15:30 CET; Attendance / 44,000; Referee / Markus Merk; Bayern Munich / VfL Wolfsburg; Santa Cruz 27'; Élber (yellow card); Scholl (yellow card) / Franz (yellow card); Sarpei (yellow card)
14	23 November	A	1. FC Kaiserslautern	2 – 0	1	32	17	Report / Report link; Kick off / 15:30 CET; Attendance / 40,010 (sell-out); Referee / Lutz Michael Fröhlich; 1. FC Kaiserslautern / Bayern Munich; Hervé Lembi (yellow card); Bjelica (yellow card); Basler (yellow card) / Ballack 9'; Santa Cruz 16'; Lizarazu (yellow card)
15	30 November	H	Hertha BSC	2 – 0	1	35	19	Report / Report link; Kick off / 15:30 CET; Attendance / 40,000; Referee / Jürgen Jansen; Bayern Munich / Hertha BSC; Ballack 40', 72' (pen.); Kahn (yellow card) / Karwan (yellow card) van Burik (yellow card)
16	7 December	A	VfB Stuttgart	3 – 0	1	38	22	Report / Report link; Kick off / 15:30 CET; Attendance / 53,400 (sell-out); Referee / Edgar Steinborn; VfB Stuttgart / Bayern Munich; Hinkel (yellow card); Meißner (yellow card) / Zickler 29'; Santa Cruz 33', 68'; N. Kovač (yellow card)
17	14 December	H	Schalke 04	0 – 0	1	39	22	Report / Report link; Kick off / 15:30 CET; Attendance / 51,000; Referee / Jürgen Aust; Bayern Munich / Schalke 04; Ballack (yellow card); Jeremies (yellow card); Kovač (yellow card) / Möller (yellow card)
18	26 January	H	Borussia Mönchengladbach	3 – 0	1	42	25	Report / Report link; Kick off / 20:00 CET; Attendance / 40,000; Referee / Knut Kircher; Bayern Munich / Borussia Mönchengladbach; Hargreaves 25'; Zickler 85'; Élber 89'; Ballack (yellow card); Lizarazu (yellow card) / Eberl (yellow card)
19	1 February	A	Arminia Bielefeld	0 – 0	1	43	25	Report / Report link; Kick off / 15:30 CET; Attendance / 26,601 (sell-out); Referee / Uwe Kemmling; Arminia Bielefeld / Bayern Munich; Dabrowski (yellow card); Vata (yellow card) / Jeremies (yellow card); Linke (yellow card)
20	9 February	H	Hamburger SV	1 – 1	1	44	25	Report / Report link; Kick off / 17:30 CET; Attendance / 40,000; Referee / Lutz Wagner; Bayern Munich / Hamburger SV; Pizarro 11' / Takahara 90+2'; Benjamin (yellow card); Ujfaluši (yellow card)
21	15 February	A	1860 Munich	5 – 0	1	47	30	Report / Report link; Kick off / 15:30 CET; Attendance / 64,000; Referee / Lutz Michael Fröhlich; 1860 Munich / Bayern Munich; Kurz (yellow card) / Scholl 58', 69', 80'; Lizarazu 73'; Pizarro 78'; Jeremies (yellow card)
22	22 February	H	1. FC Nürnberg	2 – 0	1	50	32	Report / Report link; Kick off / 15:30 CET; Attendance / 45,000; Referee / Jürgen Jansen; Bayern Munich / 1. FC Nürnberg; Lizarazu 17'; Élber 59'; R. Kovač (yellow card); Pizarro (yellow card) / Stehle (yellow card); Cacau (yellow card)
23	1 March	A	Energie Cottbus	2 – 0	1	53	34	Report / Report link; Kick off / 15:30 CET; Attendance / 18,250 (sell-out); Referee / Jürgen Aust; Energie Cottbus / Bayern Munich; Topić (yellow card); Berhalter (yellow card) / Ballack 33', 58' (yellow card); Pizarro (yellow card); N. Kovač (yellow card)
24	8 March	H	Bayer Leverkusen	3 – 0	1	56	37	Report / Report link; Kick off / 15:30 CET; Attendance / 50,000; Referee / Herbert Fandel; Bayern Munich / Bayer Leverkusen; Pizarro 2'; Élber 22', 75'; R. Kovač (yellow card) / Placente (yellow card); Živković (yellow card); Ramelow (yellow card)
25	15 March	A	VfL Bochum	4 – 1	1	59	40	Report / Report link; Kick off / 15:30 CET; Attendance / 32,645 (sell-out); Referee / Markus Merk; VfL Bochum / Bayern Munich; Christiansen 90' / Pizarro 19'; Élber 37'; N. Kovač 49'; Sagnol 87'
26	22 March	H	Hansa Rostock	1 – 0	1	62	41	Report / Report link; Kick off / 15:30 CET; Attendance / 43,000; Referee / Lutz Wagner; Bayern Munich / Hansa Rostock; Kovář 60' (o.g.)
27	5 April	A	Hannover 96	2 – 2	1	63	41	Report / Report link; Kick off / 15:30 CEST; Attendance / 31,878 (sell-out); Referee / Hellmut Krug; Hannover 96 / Bayern Munich; Štajner 36'; Vinícius 45'; Popescu (yellow card) / Sagnol 77' (yellow card); Pizarro 86'; Zé Roberto (yellow card); Tarnat (yellow card)
28	12 April	H	Werder Bremen	0 – 1	1	63	40	Report / Report link; Kick off / 15:30 CEST; Attendance / 63,000 (sell-out); Referee / Torsten Koop; Bayern Munich / Werder Bremen; N. Kovač (yellow card); R. Kovač (yellow card) / Micoud 13'; Banović (yellow card); Barten (yellow card)
29	19 April	A	Borussia Dortmund	0 – 1	1	63	39	Report / Report link; Kick off / 15:30 CEST; Attendance / 68,600 (sell-out); Referee / Markus Merk; Borussia Dortmund / Bayern Munich; Amoroso 61' (pen.); Wörns (yellow card) / N. Kovač (yellow card)
30	26 April	A	VfL Wolfsburg	2 – 0	1	66	41	Report / Report link; Kick off / 15:30 CEST; Attendance / 30,000 (sell-out); Referee / Herbert Fandel; VfL Wolfsburg / Bayern Munich; Rau (yellow card); Schnoor (yellow card) / Élber 59'; Pizarro 83'
31	3 May	H	1. FC Kaiserslautern	1 – 0	1	69	42	Report / Report link; Kick off / 15:30 CEST; Attendance / 63,000 (sell-out); Referee / Uwe Kemmling; Bayern Munich / 1. FC Kaiserslautern; Kuffour 85'; Sagnol (yellow card); Ballack (yellow card) / Hervé Lembi (yellow card); Tchato (yellow card)
32	10 May	A	Hertha BSC	6 – 3	1	72	45	Report / Report link; Kick off / 15:30 CEST; Attendance / 59,200 (sell-out); Referee / Edgar Steinborn; Hertha BSC / Bayern Munich; Ballack 5' (o.g.); Marcelinho 59' (pen.), 88'; Rehmer (yellow card); Neuendorf (yellow card); Madlung (yellow card) / Élber 19', 32', 45'; Pizarro 22', 23'; Ballack 85'; Schweinsteiger (yellow card)
33	17 May	H	VfB Stuttgart	2 – 1	1	75	46	Report / Report link; Kick off / 15:30 CEST; Attendance / 63,000 (sell-out); Referee / Markus Merk; Bayern Munich / VfB Stuttgart; Élber 46', 75' / Dundee 83'; Meira (yellow card)
34	24 May	A	Schalke 04	0 – 1	1	75	45	Report / Report link; Kick off / 15:30 CEST; Attendance / 60,886 (sell-out); Referee / Florian Meyer; Schalke 04 / Bayern Munich; Oude Kamphuis 38'; Böhme (yellow card); Van Kerckhoven (yellow card); Kmetsch (yellow card) / Ballack (yellow card); Linke (yellow card)

^{1}Bayern Munich goals come first.
Ground's country's flag and opponent's country's flag shown when from a different country of Bayern Munich.
Pos. = Position in league, Pts. = Points, GD = Goal difference, Ground: H = Home, A = Away, N = Neutral, HR = Home replacement, AR = Away replacement.

=== DFB-Pokal ===
31 August 1st Round	Werder Bremen II	0–3	Bayern Munich	Bremen
15:30 CEST		Report	Élber 51'; Pizarro 64'; Ballack 65'	Stadium: Weserstadion; Attendance: 16,434; Referee: Jürgen Jansen

6 November 2nd Round	Bayern Munich	2–1	Hannover 96	Munich
19:00 CET	Salihamidžić 56' (pen.) (yellow card); Santa Cruz 58'; Jeremies (yellow card); Kahn (yellow card)	Report	Nkufo 90+1' (pen.); Schuler (yellow card)	Stadium: Olympiastadion; Attendance: 8,000; Referee: Knut Kircher

4 December Round of 16	Bayern Munich	0–0 (aet) (5–4 p)	Schalke 04	Munich
20:15 CET	Ballack (yellow card)	Report	Rodríguez (yellow card)	Stadium: Olympiastadion; Attendance: 20,000; Referee: Florian Meyer
	Penalties
	Ballack (penalty scored); Jeremies (penalty scored); Hargreaves (penalty scored); N. Kovač (penalty scored); Santa Cruz (penalty scored)		(penalty missed) Sand; (penalty scored) Möller; (penalty scored) Vermant; (penalty scored) Hajto; (penalty scored) Wilmots

4 February Quarterfinals	Bayern Munich	8–0	1. FC Köln	Munich
20:30 CET	Élber 7', 33', 70'; Hargreaves 20'; Schweinsteiger 31', 51' (yellow card); Zé Roberto 56'; Sagnol 88'	Report		Stadium: Olympiastadion; Attendance: 13,000; Referee: Herbert Fandel

5 March Semifinals	Bayern Munich	3–1	Bayer Leverkusen	Munich
20:30 CET	Ballack 30'; Élber 57', 58'	Report	Ramelow 52'; Živković (yellow card)	Stadium: Olympiastadion; Attendance: 16,000; Referee: Edgar Steinborn

31 May Final	Bayern Munich	3–1	1. FC Kaiserslautern	Berlin
19:30 CEST	Ballack 3', 10' (pen.); Pizarro 50'; Jeremies (yellow card)	Report	Hristov (red card) 78'; Klose 79' (yellow card); Anfang (yellow card); Koch (yellow card)	Stadium: Olympiastadion; Attendance: 70,490; Referee: Lutz Michael Fröhlich

=== DFB-Ligapokal ===
25 July Preliminary round	Bayern Munich	2–2 (aet) (3–4 p)	Hertha BSC	Aue
20:30 CEST	Élber 17', 88'		Paraíba 44'; Preetz 87'	Stadium: Sparkassen-Erzgebirgsstadion; Attendance: 13,400; Referee: Peter Gagelmann
	Penalties
	Salihamidžić (penalty scored); Scholl (penalty scored); Zickler (penalty scored); Sagnol (penalty missed); Tarnat (penalty missed); Élber (penalty missed)		(penalty scored) Konstantinidis; (penalty scored) Neuendorf; (penalty missed) Paraiba; (penalty scored) Schmidt; (penalty missed) Preetz; (penalty scored) Pinto

=== Champions League ===
==== Qualifying round results ====
===== 3rd qualifying round =====
14 August 1st leg	Partizan Belgrade (Serbia and Montenegro)	0–3	Bayern Munich	Belgrade, Serbia
20:30 CEST	Vukić (yellow card) 29'; Savić (yellow card) 64'; Duljaj (yellow card) 76' (red card)		Tarnat 21'; Scholl (yellow card) 39'; Jeremies 70'; Pizarro 77'	Stadium: Partizan Stadium; Attendance: 30,000; Referee: Stuart Dougal (Scotland)

27 August 2nd leg	Bayern Munich	3–1 (6–1 agg.)	(Serbia and Montenegro) Partizan Belgrade	Munich, Germany
20:30 CEST	Ballack 26'; Élber 71'; Salihamidžić 73' (pen.)		Bajić (yellow card) 20'; Vukić (yellow card) 25'; Čakar 72'	Stadium: Olympiastadion; Attendance: 40,000; Referee: Claude Colombo (France)

==== Group stage results ====
===== 1st Group Stage =====
Pos	Team	Pld	W	D	L	GF	GA	GD	Pts	Qualification	MIL	DEP	LEN	BAY
1	(Italy) Milan	6	4	0	2	12	7	+5	12	Advance to second group stage	—	1–2	2–1	2–1
2	(Spain) Deportivo La Coruña	6	4	0	2	11	12	−1	12	Advance to second group stage	0–4	—	3–1	2–1
3	(France) Lens	6	2	2	2	11	11	0	8	Transfer to UEFA Cup	2–1	3–1	—	1–1
4	(Germany) Bayern Munich	6	0	2	4	9	13	−4	2		1–2	2–3	3–3	—

Source: RSSSF

18 September 1	Bayern Munich	2–3	(Spain) Deportivo	Munich, Germany
20:45 CEST	Salihamidžić 57' (yellow card) 67'; Élber 64'		Makaay 12', 45+1', 77'; Victor (yellow card) 32'; Luque (yellow card) 90+3'	Stadium: Olympiastadion; Attendance: 40,000; Referee: Graham Poll (England)

24 September 2	Lens (France)	1–1	Bayern Munich	Lens, France
20:45 CEST	Utaka 76'		Jeremies (yellow card) 11'; R. Kovač (yellow card) 17'; Linke 23'; Hargreaves (yellow card) 32'	Stadium: Stade Félix-Bollaert; Attendance: 40,000; Referee: Lucílio Batista (Portugal)

1 October 3	Bayern Munich	1–2	(Italy) Milan	Munich, Germany
20:45 CEST	Ballack (yellow card) 33'; Pizarro 54'; Linke (yellow card) 80'		Inzaghi 52', 84'; Nesta (yellow card) 82'	Stadium: Olympiastadion; Attendance: 60,000; Referee: Hugh Dallas (Scotland)

23 October 4	Milan (Italy)	2–1	Bayern Munich	Milan, Italy
20:45 CEST	Serginho 11'; Ambrosini (yellow card) 43'; Seedorf (yellow card) 45+1'; Inzaghi 64'		Kuffour (yellow card) 19'; Tarnat 23'; Pizarro (yellow card) 32'; Santa Cruz (yellow card) 84'	Stadium: San Siro; Attendance: 75,611; Referee: Ľuboš Michel (Slovakia)

29 October 5	Deportivo (Spain)	2–1	Bayern Munich	A Coruña, Spain
20:45 CET	Victor 54'; Makaay 89'		Salihamidžić (yellow card) 30'; Sagnol (yellow card) 59'; Santa Cruz 77'	Stadium: Estadio Riazor; Attendance: 30,000; Referee: Anders Frisk (Sweden)

13 November 6	Bayern Munich	3–3	(France) Lens	Munich, Germany
20:45 CET	N. Kovač 6'; Warmuz 19' (o.g.); Élber (yellow card) 70'; R. Kovač (yellow card) 79'; Feulner 87'		Rool (yellow card) 19'; Fink 20' (o.g.); Bakari 54'; Blanchard 90'	Stadium: Olympiastadion; Attendance: 22,000; Referee: Paul Allaerts (Belgium)

== Team statistics ==
Competition	First match	Last match	Starting round	Final position	Record							
Competition	First match	Last match	Starting round	Final position	G	W	D	L	GF	GA	GD	Win %
Bundesliga	10 August	24 May	Matchday 1	1st	34	23	6	5	70	25	+45	67.65
DFB-Pokal	31 August	31 May	First round	Winners	6	5	1	0	19	3	+16	83.33
DFB-Ligapokal	25 July	25 July	Preliminary round	Preliminary round	1	0	1	0	2	2	+0	0.00
Champions League	14 August	13 November	3rd qualifying round	1st group stage	8	2	2	4	15	14	+1	25.00
Total					49	30	10	9	106	44	+62	61.22

== Squad information ==
=== Statistics ===
Squad Season 2002–03
No.	Player	Nat.	Birthday	at FCB since	BL matches	BL goals	Cup matches	Cup goals	UCL matches	UCL goals	Total matches	Total goals
Goalkeepers
1	Oliver Kahn	(Germany)	15 June 1969	1994	33	0	6	0	6	0	45	0
22	Bernd Dreher	(Germany)	2 November 1966	1996	0	0	0	0	0	0	0	0
33	Stefan Wessels	(Germany)	28 February 1979	1998	1	0	0	0	3	0	4	0
Defenders
2	Willy Sagnol	(France)	18 March 1977	2000	23	2	5	1	4	0	32	3
3	Bixente Lizarazu	(France)	9 December 1969	1997	26	2	5	0	3	0	34	2
4	Samuel Kuffour	(Ghana)	3 September 1976	1993	20	1	4	0	5	0	29	1
5	Robert Kovač	(Croatia)	6 April 1974	2001	24	0	4	0	6	0	34	0
25	Thomas Linke	(Germany)	26 December 1969	1998	32	0	6	0	6	0	44	1
29	Philipp Lahm	(Germany)	11 November 1983	1995	0	0	0	0	1	0	1	0
Midfielders
6	Pablo Thiam	(Guinea)	3 January 1974	2001	4	0	0	0	1	0	5	0
7	Mehmet Scholl	(Germany)	16 October 1970	1992	18	4	4	0	4	0	26	0
8	Niko Kovač	(Croatia)	15 October 1971	2001	18	1	4	1	2	1	24	3
11	Zé Roberto	(Brazil)	6 July 1974	2002	31	1	4	1	7	0	42	2
13	Michael Ballack	(Germany)	26 September 1976	2002	26	10	5	5	7	1	38	16
16	Jens Jeremies	(Germany)	5 March 1974	1998	29	0	4	1	7	1	40	2
17	Thorsten Fink	(Germany)	29 October 1967	1997	10	0	2	0	3	1	19	1
18	Michael Tarnat	(Germany)	27 October 1969	1997	11	0	3	0	7	0	21	0
20	Hasan Salihamidžić	(Bosnia and Herzegovina)	1 January 1971	1998	12	2	2	1	7	2	21	5
23	Owen Hargreaves	(England) (Canada)	20 January 1981	1997	25	1	5	2	5	0	35	3
26	Sebastian Deisler	(Germany)	5 January 1980	2002	8	0	2	0	0	0	10	0
31	Bastian Schweinsteiger	(Germany)	1 August 1984	1998	14	0	2	2	1	0	17	2
32	Markus Feulner	(Germany)	12 February 1982	1997	10	0	1	0	3	1	14	1
Forwards
9	Giovane Élber	(Brazil)	23 July 1972	1997	33	21	6	6	8	2	47	29
14	Claudio Pizarro	(Peru) (Italy)	3 October 1978	2001	31	15	6	2	7	2	44	19
21	Alexander Zickler	German	28 February 1974	1993	12	4	1	0	4	0	17	4
24	Roque Santa Cruz	(Paraguay) (Spain)	16 August 1981	1999	14	5	3	2	2	1	19	8
34	Piotr Trochowski	(Germany)	22 March 1984	1999	3	0	0	0	0	0	3	0
35	Zvjezdan Misimović	(Bosnia and Herzegovina)	5 June 1982	2000	1	0	0	0	0	0	1	0

=== Minutes played ===
No.	Player	Total	Bundesliga	DFB-Pokal	DFB-Ligaokal	Champions League
1	Oliver Kahn	4,041	2,970	570	0	501
9	Giovane Élber	4,017	2,837	420	120	640
25	Thomas Linke	3,821	2,711	570	0	540
14	Claudio Pizarro	3,455	2,325	495	67	568
13	Michael Ballack	3,293	2,253	458	0	582
11	Zé Roberto	3,251	2,340	362	0	549
16	Jens Jeremies	3,247	2,279	362	0	606
3	Bixente Lizarazu	3,067	2,221	456	0	197
5	Robert Kovač	2,847	2,097	90	120	540
2	Willy Sagnol	2,537	1,741	360	120	316
23	Owen Hargreaves	2,507	1,661	450	0	396
4	Samuel Kuffour	2,492	1,676	323	120	373
20	Hasan Salihamidžić	1,833	976	180	120	557
18	Michael Tarnat	1,426	686	114	120	506
8	Niko Kovač	1,419	1,049	149	120	101
7	Mehmet Scholl	1,391	1,021	149	120	275
24	Roque Santa Cruz	1,048	768	218	0	62
31	Bastian Schweinsteiger	768	690	64	0	14
21	Alexander Zickler	519	340	7	53	119
17	Thorsten Fink	492	171	104	76	141
33	Stefan Wessels	429	90	0	120	219
32	Markus Feulner	368	216	44	0	108
26	Sebastian Deisler	285	260	25	0	0
6	Pablo Thiam	250	196	0	44	10

=== Bookings ===
No.	Player	Bundesliga			DFB-Pokal			DFB-Ligapokal			Champions League			Total		
No.	Player	Yellow card	(yellow card) (red card)	Red card	Yellow card	(yellow card) (red card)	Red card	Yellow card	(yellow card) (red card)	Red card	Yellow card	(yellow card) (red card)	Red card	Yellow card	(yellow card) (red card)	Red card
13	Michael Ballack	8	0	0	1	0	0	0	0	0	1	0	0	10	0	0
16	Jens Jeremies	6	0	0	2	0	0	0	0	0	1	0	0	9	0	0
5	Robert Kovač	5	0	0	0	0	0	0	0	0	2	0	0	7	0	0
8	Niko Kovač	5	0	0	0	0	0	1	0	0	0	0	0	6	0	0
9	Giovane Élber	4	0	0	0	0	0	0	0	0	1	0	0	5	0	0
20	Hasan Salihamidžić	2	0	0	1	0	0	0	0	0	2	0	0	5	0	0
25	Thomas Linke	4	0	0	0	0	0	0	0	0	1	0	0	5	0	0
2	Willy Sagnol	3	0	0	0	0	0	0	0	0	1	0	0	4	0	0
1	Oliver Kahn	2	0	0	1	0	0	0	0	0	0	0	0	3	0	0
3	Bixente Lizarazu	3	0	0	0	0	0	0	0	0	0	0	0	3	0	0
7	Mehmet Scholl	2	0	0	0	0	0	0	0	0	1	0	0	3	0	0
14	Claudio Pizarro	2	0	0	0	0	0	0	0	0	1	0	0	3	0	0
31	Bastian Schweinsteiger	1	0	0	1	0	0	0	0	0	0	0	0	2	0	0
4	Samuel Kuffour	0	0	0	0	0	0	0	0	0	1	0	0	1	0	0
11	Zé Roberto	1	0	0	0	0	0	0	0	0	0	0	0	1	0	0
18	Michael Tarnat	1	0	0	0	0	0	0	0	0	0	0	0	1	0	0
17	Thorsten Fink	1	0	0	0	0	0	0	0	0	0	0	0	1	0	0
23	Owen Hargreaves	0	0	0	0	0	0	0	0	0	1	0	0	1	0	0
24	Roque Santa Cruz	0	0	0	0	0	0	0	0	0	1	0	0	1	0	0
Totals		50	0	0	7	0	0	1	0	0	14	0	0	72	0	0

=== Suspensions ===
No.	Player	No. of matches served	Reason	Competition served in	Date served	Opponent(s)	Source
20	Hasan Salihamidžić	1	Red card vs. Real Madrid in 2001–02 CL	Champions League	14 August	Partizan Belgrade	
13	Michael Ballack	1	5th yellow card	Bundesliga	1 February	Arminia Bielefeld	
16	Jens Jeremies	1	5th yellow card	Bundesliga	9 February	Hamburger SV	
5	Robert Kovač	1	5th yellow card	Bundesliga	19 April	Borussia Dortmund	
8	Niko Kovač	1	5th yellow card	Bundesliga	26 April	VfL Wolfsburg	

=== Transfers ===
==== In ====
First Team

No.	Pos.	Nat.	Name	Age	EU	Moving from	Type	Transfer window	Ends	Transfer fee	Source
11	MF	(Brazil)	Zé Roberto	27	EU	Bayer Leverkusen	Transfer	Summer		€12 Million	
26	MF	(Germany)	Sebastian Deisler	22	EU	Hertha BSC	Transfer	Summer		€9 Million	
13	MF	(Germany)	Michael Ballack	25	EU	Bayer Leverkusen	Transfer	Summer		€6 Million	
29	DF	(Germany)	Philipp Lahm	18	EU	Youth system	Promotion	Summer		N/A	
31	MF	(Germany)	Bastian Schweinsteiger	17	EU	Youth system	Promotion	Summer		N/A	

==== Out ====
No.	Pos.	Nat.	Name	Age	EU	Moving to	Type	Transfer window	Transfer fee	Source
19	FW	(Germany)	Carsten Jancker	27	EU	Udinese (Italy)	Transfer	Summer	€2.5 Million	
11	MF	(Germany)	Stefan Effenberg	33	EU	VfL Wolfsburg	Transfer	Summer	Free	
6	MF	(Guinea)	Pablo Thiam	28	EU	VfL Wolfsburg	Transfer	Winter	€1 Million	
31	DF	(Germany)	Stephan Kling	21	EU	Hamburger SV	Transfer	Summer	Free	
10	MF	(Switzerland)	Ciriaco Sforza	32	Non-EU	1. FC Kaiserslautern	Transfer	Summer	Free	
13	FW	(Brazil)	Paulo Sérgio	33	Non-EU	Al-Wahda (United Arab Emirates)	Transfer	Summer	Free	
30	MF	(France)	Alou Diarra	20	EU	Liverpool (England)	Transfer	Summer	Free	
