= 2003 UEFA Champions League final =

Association football match

- Match programme cover
- Event: 2002–03 UEFA Champions League
Juventus	Milan
(Italy)	(Italy)
0	0
- After silver goal extra time Milan won 3–2 on penalties
- Date: 28 May 2003
- Venue: Old Trafford, Manchester
- Man of the Match: Paolo Maldini (Milan)
- Referee: Markus Merk (Germany)
- Attendance: 62,315
- Weather: Clear; 18 °C (64 °F)

The 2003 UEFA Champions League final was a football match that took place at Old Trafford in Manchester, England on 28 May 2003 to decide the winner of the 2002–03 UEFA Champions League. The match was contested by two Italian teams: Juventus and Milan. The match made history as it was the first time two clubs from Italy had faced each other in the final. It was also the second intra-national final of the competition, following the all-Spanish 2000 UEFA Champions League final between Real Madrid and Valencia three years earlier. Milan won the match 3–2 via a penalty shoot-out after the game had finished 0–0 after extra time. It gave Milan their sixth success in the European Cup.

== Background ==
The match was the first time two clubs from Italy had faced each other in the final; the second intra-national final of the competition, following the all-Spanish 2000 UEFA Champions League final between Real Madrid and Valencia.

Milan reached their ninth final and lost only two matches (Dortmund 1–0, and Real Madrid 3–1). In the semi-finals, they met local rivals Inter Milan; both matches finished equal (0–0; 1–1), but Milan advanced on the away goals rule. Previously Milan won finals in 1963, 1969, 1989, 1990 and 1994, and lost in 1958, 1993 and 1995.

Juventus reached their seventh final. In the semi-final, Juventus met Real Madrid; they lost the first match (2–1), but they won the second (3–1). Key midfielder Pavel Nedvěd picked up a yellow card in the second leg, for a total of three in the tournament, triggering his suspension for the final. Juventus instead deployed Mauro Camoranesi. Previously Juventus won finals in 1985 and 1996, and lost in 1973, 1983, 1997, 1998.

Juventus entered the final as 2002–03 Serie A winners, for the 27th time, and ahead of third placed Milan, as well as 2002 Supercoppa Italiana winners. Milan won the 2002–03 Coppa Italia after defeating Roma in the final.

== Venue ==
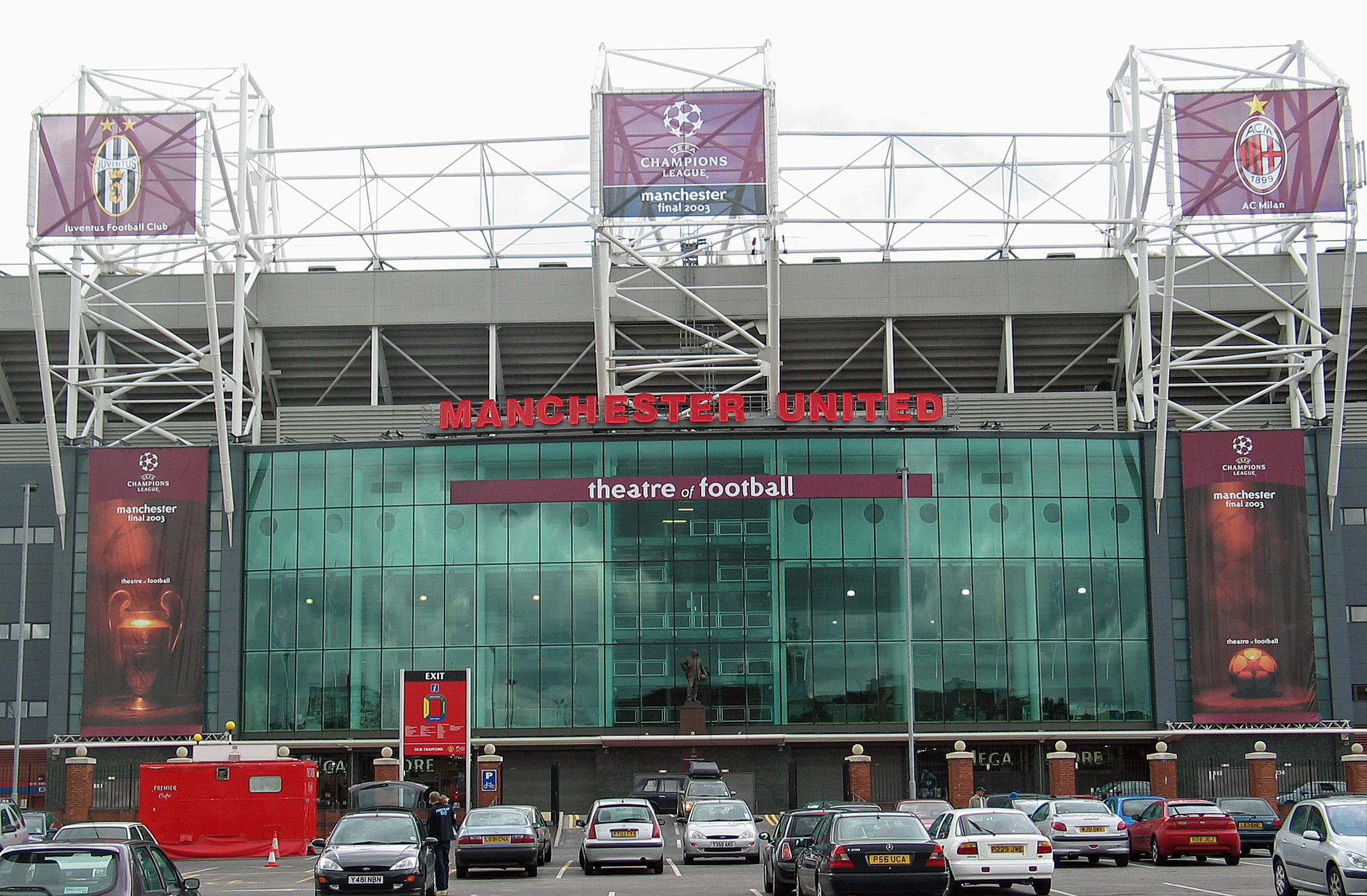
Old Trafford was selected to host the final in December 2001.

Old Trafford, the home of Manchester United, was selected to host the match in December 2001, following a meeting of the UEFA Executive Committee in Nyon, Switzerland, at the same time as Estadio de La Cartuja in Seville was selected to host the 2003 UEFA Cup Final. It was selected ahead of the likes of the Millennium Stadium in Cardiff, the Santiago Bernabeu Stadium in Madrid, the Stade de France in Saint-Denis near Paris, and the Amsterdam Arena.

It would be the first time the stadium had hosted a major European final, although it had been the venue for both the two-legged 1968 Intercontinental Cup between Manchester United and Argentine club Estudiantes de La Plata, and the 1991 European Super Cup between Manchester United and Yugoslavian club Red Star Belgrade, which had been scheduled to be played over two legs, only for the Yugoslavian leg to be cancelled due to the wars in the country at the time.

The stadium had recently undergone a major expansion; following the mandatory conversion to an all-seater venue as a result of the Taylor Report and ahead of England hosting UEFA Euro 1996, the stadium's North Stand was expanded to three tiers, with a capacity of 25,500 spectators. This was followed by the addition of second tiers to the East and West Stands, which brought the overall capacity of the stadium to 68,217.

As has taken place for every Champions League final since 1997, a ceremonial handover of the European Champion Clubs' Cup from the holders to the host city took place on 3 April 2003. After receiving the trophy from a representative of holders Real Madrid in the ceremony at the Manchester Town Hall, UEFA Chief Executive Gerhard Aigner presented it to the Lord Mayor of Manchester, Roy Walters. Former Real Madrid players Alfredo Di Stéfano, Francisco Gento, Amancio and Emilio Butragueño, as were Manchester United manager Alex Ferguson, members of the club's 1968 European Cup final team, and members of Liverpool and Manchester City's past European trophy-winning teams.

Also in April 2003, a 24-hour football match – named the "Starball Match" in reference to the logo of the UEFA Champions League – was played in Manchester's Albert Square. It was the second Starball Match, after the inaugural match was held in Glasgow ahead of the 2002 UEFA Champions League final at Hampden Park. Over 1,000 players participated in the match, playing for sides named "Internazionale Manchester" and "Real Mancunian", in reference to Italian club Inter Milan and Spanish club Real Madrid. Internazionale Manchester won the match 252–162.

== Route to the final ==
(Italy) Juventus				Round	(Italy) Milan			
Opponent	Agg.	1st leg	2nd leg	Qualifying phase	Opponent	Agg.	1st leg	2nd leg
Bye				Third qualifying round	(Czech Republic) Slovan Liberec	2–2 (a)	1–0 (H)	1–2 (A)
Opponent	Result			First group stage	Opponent	Result		
(Netherlands) Feyenoord	1–1 (A)			Matchday 1	(France) Lens	2–1 (H)		
(Ukraine) Dynamo Kyiv	5–0 (H)			Matchday 2	(Spain) Deportivo La Coruña	4–0 (A)		
(England) Newcastle United	2–0 (H)			Matchday 3	(Germany) Bayern Munich	2–1 (A)		
(England) Newcastle United	0–1 (A)			Matchday 4	(Germany) Bayern Munich	2–1 (H)		
(Netherlands) Feyenoord	2–0 (H)			Matchday 5	(France) Lens	1–2 (A)		
(Ukraine) Dynamo Kyiv	2–1 (A)			Matchday 6	(Spain) Deportivo La Coruña	1–2 (H)		
Group E winners: Pos / Team / Pld / Pts; 1 / (Italy) Juventus / 6 / 13; 2 / (England) Newcastle United / 6 / 9; 3 / (Ukraine) Dynamo Kyiv / 6 / 7; 4 / (Netherlands) Feyenoord / 6 / 5; Source: RSSSF				Final standings	Group G winners: Pos / Team / Pld / Pts; 1 / (Italy) Milan / 6 / 12; 2 / (Spain) Deportivo La Coruña / 6 / 12; 3 / (France) Lens / 6 / 8; 4 / (Germany) Bayern Munich / 6 / 2; Source: RSSSF			
Opponent	Result			Second group stage	Opponent	Result		
(Spain) Deportivo La Coruña	2–2 (A)			Matchday 1	(Spain) Real Madrid	1–0 (H)		
(Switzerland) Basel	4–0 (H)			Matchday 2	(Germany) Borussia Dortmund	1–0 (A)		
(England) Manchester United	1–2 (A)			Matchday 3	(Russia) Lokomotiv Moscow	1–0 (H)		
(England) Manchester United	0–3 (H)			Matchday 4	(Russia) Lokomotiv Moscow	1–0 (A)		
(Spain) Deportivo La Coruña	3–2 (H)			Matchday 5	(Spain) Real Madrid	1–3 (A)		
(Switzerland) Basel	1–2 (A)			Matchday 6	(Germany) Borussia Dortmund	0–1 (H)		
Group D runners-up: Pos / Team / Pld / Pts; 1 / (England) Manchester United / 6 / 13; 2 / (Italy) Juventus / 6 / 7; 3 / (Switzerland) Basel / 6 / 7; 4 / (Spain) Deportivo La Coruña / 6 / 7; Source: RSSSF				Final standings	Group C winners: Pos / Team / Pld / Pts; 1 / (Italy) Milan / 6 / 12; 2 / (Spain) Real Madrid / 6 / 11; 3 / (Germany) Borussia Dortmund / 6 / 10; 4 / (Russia) Lokomotiv Moscow / 6 / 1; Source: RSSSF			
Opponent	Agg.	1st leg	2nd leg	Knockout phase	Opponent	Agg.	1st leg	2nd leg
(Spain) Barcelona	3–2	1–1 (H)	2–1 (a.e.t.) (A)	Quarter-finals	(Netherlands) Ajax	3–2	0–0 (A)	3–2 (H)
(Spain) Real Madrid	4–3	1–2 (A)	3–1 (H)	Semi-finals	(Italy) Inter Milan	1–1 (a)	0–0 (H)	1–1 (A)

== Match ==
=== Summary ===
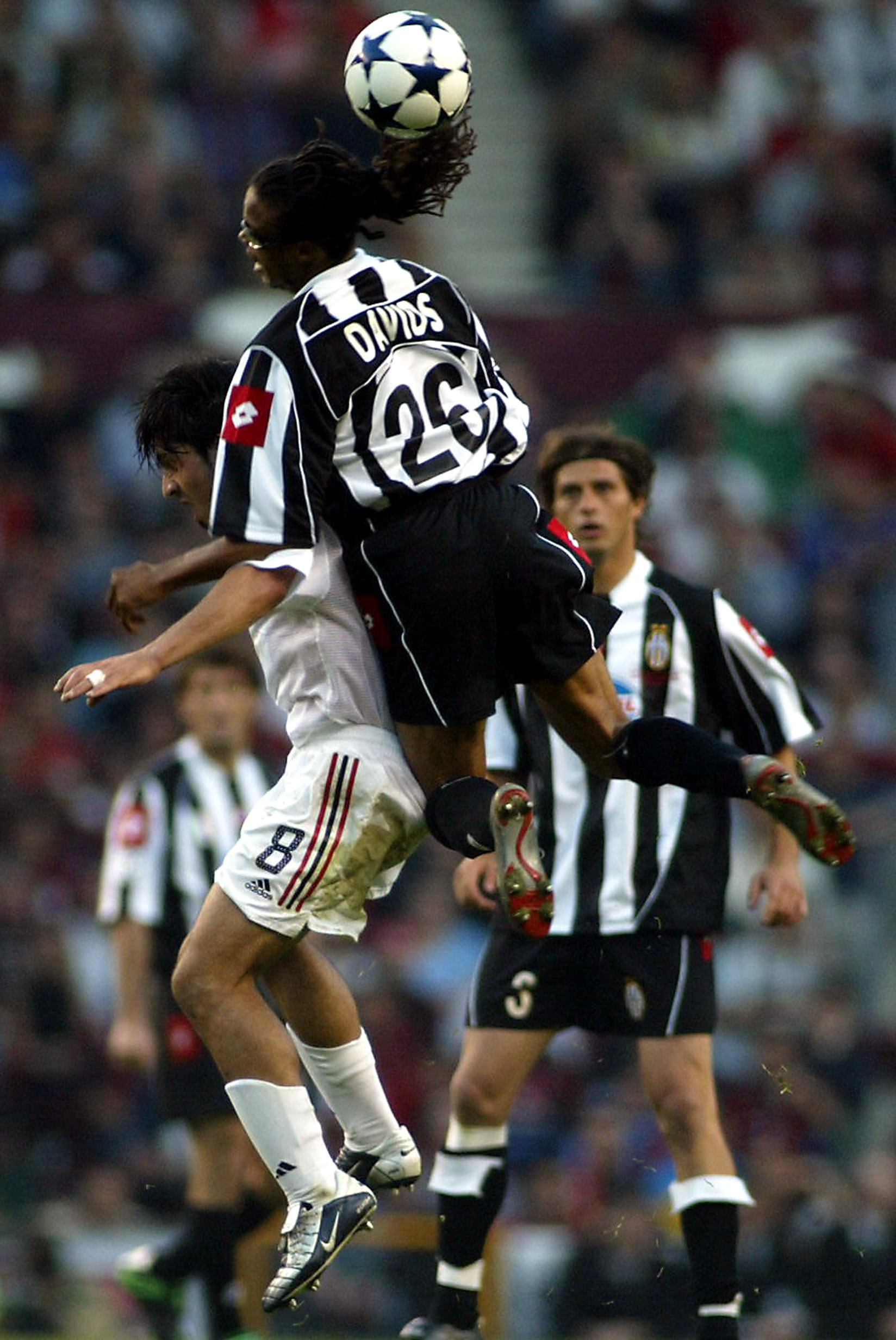
Edgar Davids (no. 26) clashing with Gennaro Gattuso during the match

Refereed by Markus Merk, the final was a tactical match with both teams playing solid defensively. In the 9th minute, Andriy Shevchenko slipped in a back pass from Filippo Inzaghi who scored the goal for Milan, but was ruled offside as Rui Costa was found to obscure Juventus goalkeeper Gianluigi Buffon's view. Later in the half, Inzaghi created danger with a hard and fast header that Buffon reflexively saved. At the end of the first half, Juventus' Igor Tudor was replaced by Alessandro Birindelli due to injury.

In the second half, Juventus coach Marcello Lippi replaced Mauro Camoranesi with Antonio Conte, who later struck the crossbar. Marcelo Zalayeta was the final substitution for Juventus, while Milan subbed on Massimo Ambrosini, Roque Júnior and Serginho; Juventus strengthened the attack, while Milan strengthened the flanks and the midfield.

The match ended 0–0 after regulation time. In the 95th minute, Roque Júnior was injured, but Milan having used all substitutions, remained on the pitch, while Juventus lacked attacking conviction and were unable to capitalize. After extra-time, the match remained 0–0 and went to penalty shoot-out. Dida saved Trezeguet's penalty, the first shooter of the penalty takers. After Serginho scored for Milan and Birindelli the subsequent penalty for Juventus, Buffon saved Clarence Seedorf's shot. Zalayeta and Paolo Montero consecutively had their penalties saved by Dida, while Buffon saved Kakha Kaladze's shot. Alessandro Nesta then scored for Milan and Alessandro Del Piero for Juventus, Shevchenko then had the chance to score the decisive penalty, and did; Milan won by a score of 3–2. This gave Milan their sixth European Cup, nine years after their last continental success. Paolo Maldini was named man of the match at the end of the final, and lifted the European Cup as captain of Milan, just as his father Cesare Maldini had done exactly 40 years earlier.

=== Details ===
28 May 2003
19:45 UTC+1

Juventus (Italy)	0–0 (a.e.t.)	(Italy) Milan
	Report
Penalties
Trezeguet (penalty missed); Birindelli (penalty scored); Zalayeta (penalty missed); Montero (penalty missed); Del Piero (penalty scored)	2–3	(penalty scored) Serginho; (penalty missed) Seedorf; (penalty missed) Kaladze; (penalty scored) Nesta; (penalty scored) Shevchenko

Old Trafford, Manchester
Attendance: 62,315
Referee: Markus Merk (Germany)

Juventus	Milan

GK	1	(Italy) Gianluigi Buffon
RB	21	(France) Lilian Thuram
CB	2	(Italy) Ciro Ferrara
CB	5	(Croatia) Igor Tudor		(substituted off) 42'
LB	4	(Uruguay) Paolo Montero
RM	16	(Italy) Mauro Camoranesi		(substituted off) 46'
CM	3	(Italy) Alessio Tacchinardi	(yellow card) 69'
CM	26	(Netherlands) Edgar Davids		(substituted off) 65'
LM	19	(Italy) Gianluca Zambrotta
CF	17	(France) David Trezeguet
CF	10	(Italy) Alessandro Del Piero (c)	(yellow card) 111'
Substitutes:
GK	12	(Italy) Antonio Chimenti
DF	7	(Italy) Gianluca Pessotto
DF	13	(Italy) Mark Iuliano
DF	15	(Italy) Alessandro Birindelli		(substituted on) 42'
MF	8	(Italy) Antonio Conte		(substituted on) 46'
FW	24	(Italy) Marco Di Vaio
FW	25	(Uruguay) Marcelo Zalayeta		(substituted on) 65'
Manager:
(Italy) Marcello Lippi

GK	12	(Brazil) Dida
RB	19	(Italy) Alessandro Costacurta	(yellow card) 18'	(substituted off) 66'
CB	13	(Italy) Alessandro Nesta
CB	3	(Italy) Paolo Maldini (c)
LB	4	(Georgia (country)) Kakha Kaladze
RM	8	(Italy) Gennaro Gattuso
CM	21	(Italy) Andrea Pirlo		(substituted off) 71'
LM	20	(Netherlands) Clarence Seedorf
AM	10	(Portugal) Rui Costa		(substituted off) 87'
CF	7	(Ukraine) Andriy Shevchenko
CF	9	(Italy) Filippo Inzaghi
Substitutes:
GK	18	(Italy) Christian Abbiati
DF	24	(Denmark) Martin Laursen
DF	25	(Brazil) Roque Júnior		(substituted on) 66'
MF	23	(Italy) Massimo Ambrosini		(substituted on) 87'
MF	27	(Brazil) Serginho		(substituted on) 71'
MF	32	(Italy) Cristian Brocchi
FW	11	(Brazil) Rivaldo
Manager:
(Italy) Carlo Ancelotti

Man of the Match:
Paolo Maldini (Milan)

Assistant referees:
Christian Schräer (Germany)
Heiner Müller (Germany)
Fourth official:
Wolfgang Stark (Germany)

Match rules

- 90 minutes.
- 30 minutes of silver goal extra time if necessary.
- Penalty shoot-out if scores still level.
- Seven named substitutes.
- Maximum of three substitutions.

=== Statistics ===
First half
Statistic	Juventus	Milan
Goals scored	0	0
Total shots	4	5
Shots on target	1	3
Ball possession	46%	54%
Corner kicks	2	7
Fouls committed	12	13
Offsides	0	4
Yellow cards	0	1
Red cards	0	0

Second half and extra time
Statistic	Juventus	Milan
Goals scored	0	0
Total shots	7	9
Shots on target	1	3
Ball possession	51%	49%
Corner kicks	3	6
Fouls committed	22	10
Offsides	1	2
Yellow cards	2	0
Red cards	0	0

Overall
Statistic	Juventus	Milan
Goals scored	0	0
Total shots	11	14
Shots on target	2	6
Ball possession	49%	51%
Corner kicks	5	13
Fouls committed	34	23
Offsides	1	6
Yellow cards	2	1
Red cards	0	0

== Post-match and legacy ==
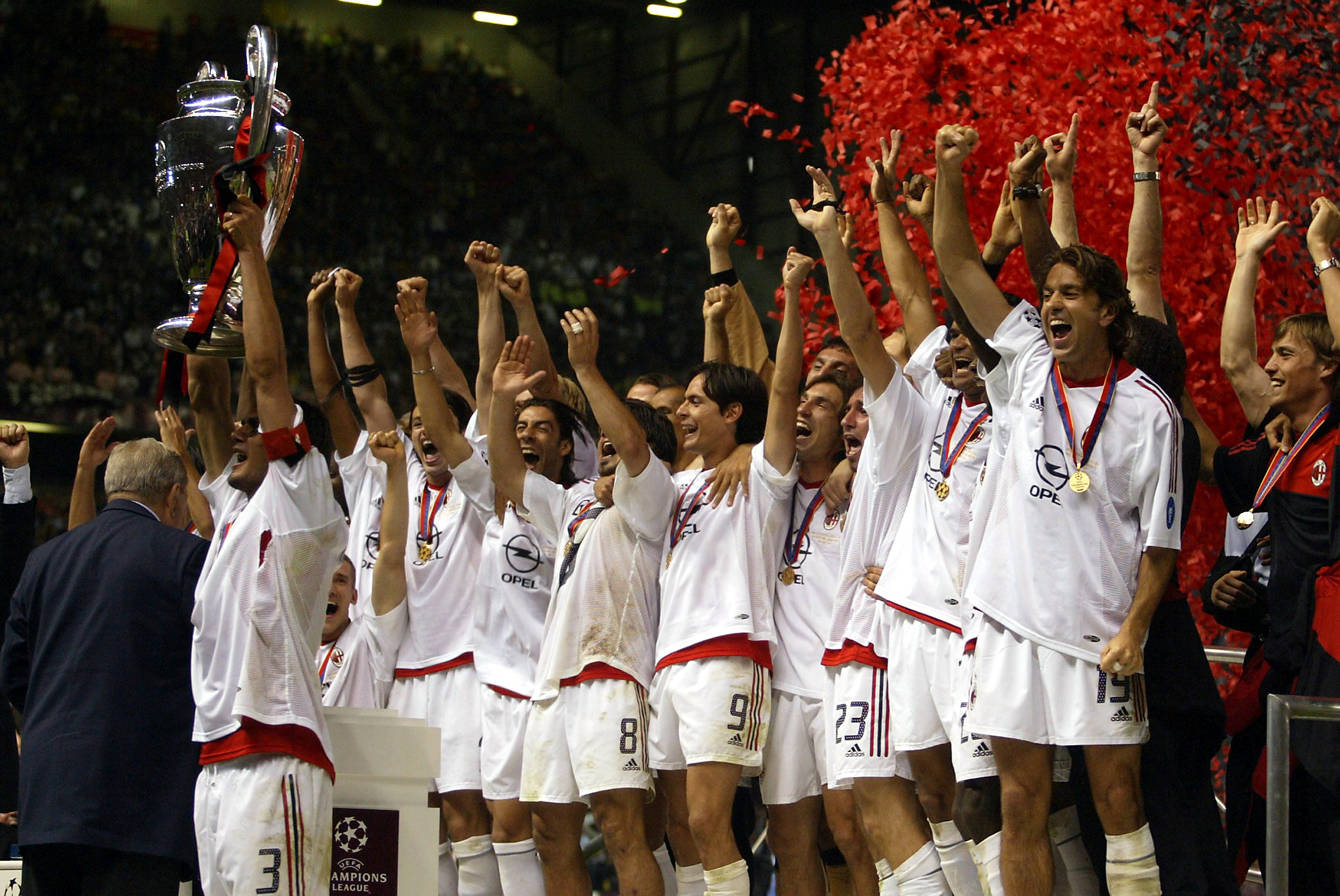
Milan celebrate their sixth European Cup title

Juventus collected their third defeat in the competition under Lippi's management. Juventus was criticised for being to be too dependent on Nedvěd, which struggled in his absence, as well as for Lippi's tactical choices.

The teams would again meet in a feature final several months later in the 2003 Supercoppa Italiana in the United States. The game again required penalties to determine the winners, this time, however, Juventus came out on top.

On 28 May 2023, the 20th anniversary of this final, both teams coincidentally met on the penultimate matchday of their Serie A domestic league, with Milan once again prevailing over Juventus in a 1–0 away victory in Turin. Out of all players and technical staff from both teams that were also present 20 years ago, only Paolo Maldini was still involved with his club as a technical director at the time, shortly before his resignation in early June. Ironically, Pavel Nedvěd, suspended for the 2003 final through accumulation of yellow cards, had also been suspended from his executive duties at Juventus for 8 months in January 2023 due to his club's involvement in violations of financial fair play, and therefore could not attend the game.

== See also ==
- 2003 UEFA Cup final
- 2003 UEFA Super Cup
- 2003 Intercontinental Cup
- 2003 UEFA Women's Cup final
- 2002–03 AC Milan season
- 2002–03 Juventus FC season
- AC Milan in international football
- Italian football clubs in international competitions
- Juventus FC–AC Milan rivalry
- Juventus FC in international football
