= 2002–03 UEFA Champions League =

European football tournament

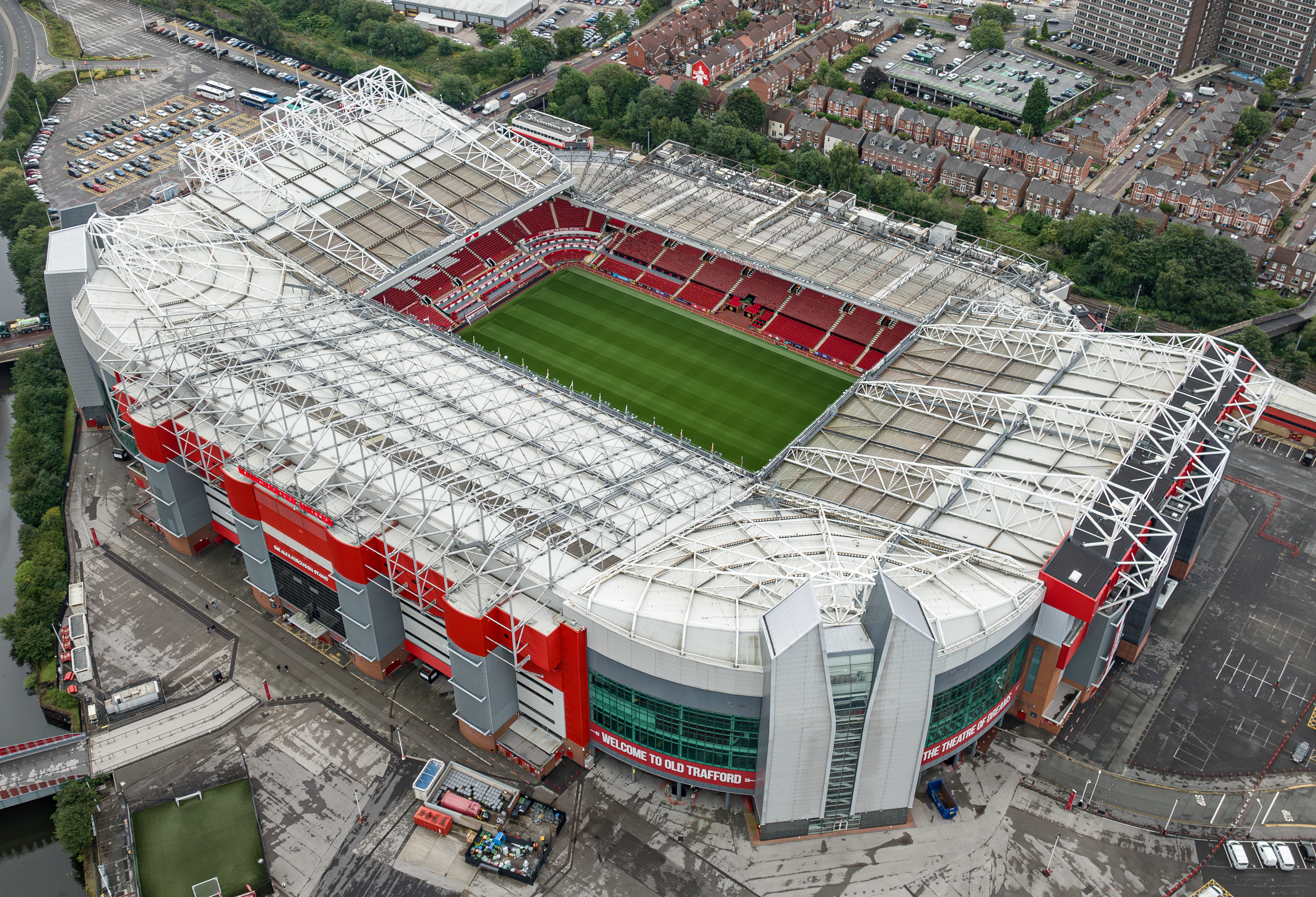
- Old Trafford in Manchester hosted the final

Tournament details
- Dates: Qualifying: 17 July – 28 August 2002; Competition proper: 17 September 2002 – 28 May 2003
- Teams: Competition proper: 32; Total: 72

Final positions
- Champions: (Italy) Milan (6th title)
- Runners-up: (Italy) Juventus

Tournament statistics
- Matches played: 157
- Goals scored: 428 (2.73 per match)
- Attendance: 6,416,965 (40,872 per match)
- Top scorer(s): Ruud van Nistelrooy (Manchester United); 12 goals

The 2002–03 UEFA Champions League was the 11th season of UEFA's premier European club football tournament, the UEFA Champions League, since its rebranding in 1992, and the 48th European Cup tournament overall. The competition was won by Milan, who beat Juventus on penalties in the European Cup's first ever all-Italian final, to win their sixth European title, and its first in nine years. Manchester United's Ruud van Nistelrooy was again the top scorer, scoring 12 goals over the two group stages and knockout stage, in addition to two goals he had scored in the qualifying phase, although his side bowed out in the quarter-finals and missed out on the chance of playing in a final at their own stadium.

Real Madrid were the defending champions, but were eliminated by Juventus in the semi-finals.

== Association team allocation ==
A total of 72 teams participated in the 2002–03 Champions League, from 48 of 52 UEFA associations (Liechtenstein organises no domestic league competition). Two lowest-ranked associations (Andorra and San Marino) were not admitted. Additionally, no teams from Azerbaijan were admitted this year as no official champion was decided in the 2001–02 season.

Below is the qualification scheme for the 2002–03 UEFA Champions League:

- Associations 1–3 each have four teams qualify
- Associations 4–6 each have three teams qualify
- Associations 7–15 each have two teams qualify
- Associations 16–52 each have one team qualify (except Liechtenstein, San Marino, Andorra and Azerbaijan)

=== Association ranking ===
Countries are allocated places according to their 2001 UEFA league coefficient, which takes into account their performance in European competitions from 1996–97 to 2000–01.

Rank	Association	Coeff.	Teams
1	Spain	65.210	4
2	Italy	56.239	4
3	England	51.288	4
4	Germany	48.632	3
5	France	42.352	3
6	Netherlands	30.249	3
7	Turkey	29.975	2
8	Greece	28.366	2
9	Russia	27.708	2
10	Portugal	26.274	2
11	Czech Republic	24.791	2
12	Belgium	24.150	2
13	Ukraine	23.833	2
14	Austria	23.750	2
15	Norway	23.600	2
16	Scotland	22.625	1
17	Switzerland	21.875	1
18	Croatia	19.999	1

Rank	Association	Coeff.	Teams
19	Sweden	18.208	1
20	Poland	17.500	1
21	Denmark	17.175	1
22	Romania	15.791	1
23	FR Yugoslavia	15.415	1
24	Hungary	15.082	1
25	Slovakia	14.665	1
26	Israel	14.124	1
27	Slovenia	11.998	1
28	Bulgaria	11.665	1
29	Cyprus	10.832	1
30	Georgia	9.666	1
31	Finland	8.541	1
32	Latvia	7.832	1
33	Iceland	5.332	1
34	Belarus	4.833	1
35	Moldova	4.499	1

Rank	Association	Coeff.	Teams
36	Lithuania	4.498	1
37	Macedonia	3.497	1
38	Republic of Ireland	2.998	1
39	Estonia	2.498	1
40	Armenia	2.165	1
41	Wales	2.165	1
42	Azerbaijan	1.665	0
43	Malta	1.665	1
44	Liechtenstein	1.500	0
45	Northern Ireland	1.331	1
46	Bosnia and Herzegovina	1.000	1
47	Luxembourg	0.665	1
48	Faroe Islands	0.665	1
49	Albania	0.499	1
50	Andorra	0.000	0
51	San Marino	0.000	0
52	Kazakhstan	0.000	1

=== Distribution ===
Since the title holders (Real Madrid) also qualified for the Champions League Third qualifying round through their domestic league, one Third qualifying round spot was vacated. Due to this, as well as due to suspension of Azerbaijan, the following changes to the default access list are made:

- The champions of association 16 (Scotland) are promoted from the second qualifying round to the third qualifying round.
- The champions of associations 26, 27 and 28 (Israel, Slovenia and Bulgaria) are promoted from the first qualifying round to the second qualifying round.

	Teams entering in this round	Teams advancing from previous round
First qualifying round (20 teams)	20 champions from associations 29–52 (except Liechtenstein, San Marino, Azerbaijan and Andorra)	
Second qualifying round (28 teams)	12 champions from associations 17–28; 6 runners-up from associations 10–15	10 winners from the first qualifying round
Third qualifying round (32 teams)	7 champions from associations 10–16; 3 runners-up from associations 7–9; 5 third-placed teams from associations 1–6 (except Spain); 3 fourth-placed teams from associations 1–3	14 winners from the second qualifying round
First group stage (32 teams)	1 current Champions League title holder (Real Madrid); 9 champions from associations 1–9; 6 runners-up from associations 1–6	16 winners from the third qualifying round
Second group stage (16 teams)		8 group winners from the first group stage; 8 group runners-up from the first group stage
Knockout phase (8 teams)		4 group winners from the second group stage; 4 group runners-up from the second group stage

=== Teams ===
League positions of the previous season shown in parentheses (TH: Champions League title holders).

Group stage
(Spain) Valencia (1st)	(Italy) Roma (2nd)	(Germany) Bayer Leverkusen (2nd)	(Netherlands) PSV Eindhoven (2nd)
(Spain) Deportivo La Coruña (2nd)	(England) Arsenal (1st)	(France) Lyon (1st)	(Turkey) Galatasaray (1st)
(Spain) Real Madrid (3rd)^{TH}	(England) Liverpool (2nd)	(France) Lens (2nd)	(Greece) Olympiacos (1st)
(Italy) Juventus (1st)	(Germany) Borussia Dortmund (1st)	(Netherlands) Ajax (1st)	(Russia) Spartak Moscow (1st)
Third qualifying round
(Spain) Barcelona (4th)	(Germany) Bayern Munich (3rd)	(Russia) Lokomotiv Moscow (2nd)	(Ukraine) Shakhtar Donetsk (1st)
(Italy) Internazionale (3rd)	(France) Auxerre (3rd)	(Portugal) Sporting CP (1st)	(Austria) Sturm Graz (2nd)
(Italy) Milan (4th)	(Netherlands) Feyenoord (3rd)	(Czech Republic) Slovan Liberec (1st)	(Norway) Rosenborg (1st)
(England) Manchester United (3rd)	(Turkey) Fenerbahçe (2nd)	(Belgium) Genk (1st)	(Scotland) Celtic (1st)
(England) Newcastle United (4th)	(Greece) AEK Athens (2nd)		
Second qualifying round
(Portugal) Boavista (2nd)	(Norway) Lillestrøm (2nd)	(Denmark) Brøndby (1st)	(Slovakia) Žilina (1st)
(Czech Republic) Sparta Prague (2nd)	(Switzerland) Basel (1st)	(Romania) Dinamo București (1st)	(Israel) Maccabi Haifa (1st)
(Belgium) Club Brugge (2nd)	(Croatia) Zagreb (1st)	(Federal Republic of Yugoslavia) Partizan (1st)	(Slovenia) Maribor (1st)
(Ukraine) Dynamo Kyiv (2nd)	(Sweden) Hammarby IF (1st)	(Hungary) Zalaegerszeg (1st)	(Bulgaria) Levski Sofia (1st)
(Austria) GAK (3rd)	(Poland) Legia Warsaw (1st)		
First qualifying round
(Cyprus) APOEL (1st)	(Belarus) Belshina Bobruisk (1st)	(Estonia) Flora (1st)	(Bosnia and Herzegovina) Željezničar (1st)
(Georgia (country)) Torpedo Kutaisi (1st)	(Moldova) Sheriff Tiraspol (1st)	(Armenia) Pyunik (1st)	(Luxembourg) F91 Dudelange (1st)
(Finland) Tampere United (1st)	(Lithuania) Kaunas (1st)	(Wales) Barry Town (1st)	(Faroe Islands) B36 (1st)
(Latvia) Skonto (1st)	(North Macedonia) Vardar (1st)	(Malta) Hibernians (1st)	(Albania) Dinamo Tirana (1st)
(Iceland) ÍA (1st)	(Republic of Ireland) Shelbourne (1st)	(Northern Ireland) Portadown (1st)	(Kazakhstan) Zhenis (1st)

Notes

1. Austria (AUT): 2001–02 Austrian Football Bundesliga champions Tirol Innsbruck did not receive a licence for the next season and were excluded from Austrian Bundesliga. Subsequently, they were excluded from the Champions League, while Bundesliga runners-up Sturm Graz were moved from Second to Third qualifying round and Bundesliga 3rd-placed team GAK replaced Sturm in the Second qualifying round.
2. Azerbaijan (AZE): Clubs from Azerbaijan were not admitted to UEFA competitions as the previous season was suspended in mid-April due to ongoing conflict between clubs and AFFA. Several weeks later the championship was resumed and subsequently finished by clubs independently from the federation. Shamkir won the league, but this title is not recognized by both UEFA and AFFA.

== Round and draw dates ==
All draws held at UEFA headquarters in Nyon, Switzerland unless stated otherwise.

Phase	Round	Draw date	First leg	Second leg
Qualifying	First qualifying round	21 June 2002 (Geneva)	17 July 2002	24 July 2002
Qualifying	Second qualifying round	21 June 2002 (Geneva)	31 July 2002	7 August 2002
Qualifying	Third qualifying round	26 July 2002	13–14 August 2002	27–28 August 2002
First group stage	Matchday 1	29 August 2002 (Monaco)	17–18 September 2002	
First group stage	Matchday 2	29 August 2002 (Monaco)	24–25 September 2002	
First group stage	Matchday 3	29 August 2002 (Monaco)	1–2 October 2002	
First group stage	Matchday 4	29 August 2002 (Monaco)	22–23 October 2002	
First group stage	Matchday 5	29 August 2002 (Monaco)	29–30 October 2002	
First group stage	Matchday 6	29 August 2002 (Monaco)	12–13 November 2002	
Second group stage	Matchday 7	15 November 2002 (Geneva)	26–27 November 2002	
Second group stage	Matchday 8	15 November 2002 (Geneva)	10–11 December 2002	
Second group stage	Matchday 9	15 November 2002 (Geneva)	18–19 February 2003	
Second group stage	Matchday 10	15 November 2002 (Geneva)	25–26 February 2003	
Second group stage	Matchday 11	15 November 2002 (Geneva)	11–12 March 2003	
Second group stage	Matchday 12	15 November 2002 (Geneva)	18–19 March 2003	
Knockout phase	Quarter-finals	21 March 2003	8–9 April 2003	22–23 April 2003
Knockout phase	Semi-finals	21 March 2003	6–7 May 2003	13–14 May 2003
Knockout phase	Final	21 March 2003	28 May 2003 at Old Trafford, Manchester	

== Qualifying rounds ==
=== First qualifying round ===
Team 1	Agg.	Team 2	1st leg	2nd leg
F91 Dudelange (Luxembourg)	1–4	(North Macedonia) Vardar	1–1	0–3
Hibernians (Malta)	3–2	(Republic of Ireland) Shelbourne	2–2	1–0
Portadown (Northern Ireland)	2–3	(Belarus) Belshina Bobruisk	0–0	2–3
Željezničar (Bosnia and Herzegovina)	4–0	(Iceland) ÍA	3–0	1–0
Skonto (Latvia)	6–0	(Wales) Barry Town	5–0	1–0
Flora (Estonia)	0–1	(Cyprus) APOEL	0–0	0–1
Sheriff Tiraspol (Moldova)	4–4 (a)	(Kazakhstan) Zhenis	2–1	2–3
Tampere United (Finland)	0–6	(Armenia) Pyunik	0–4	0–2
Kaunas (Lithuania)	2–3	(Albania) Dinamo Tirana	2–3	0–0
Torpedo Kutaisi (Georgia (country))	6–2	(Faroe Islands) B36	5–2	1–0

=== Second qualifying round ===
Team 1	Agg.	Team 2	1st leg	2nd leg
Sheriff Tiraspol (Moldova)	1–6	(Austria) GAK	1–4	0–2
Maccabi Haifa (Israel)	5–0	(Belarus) Belshina Bobruisk	4–0	1–0
Dynamo Kyiv (Ukraine)	6–2	(Armenia) Pyunik	4–0	2–2
Zalaegerszeg (Hungary)	2–2 (a)	(Croatia) Zagreb	1–0	1–2
Boavista (Portugal)	7–3	(Malta) Hibernians	4–0	3–3
Sparta Prague (Czech Republic)	5–1	(Georgia (country)) Torpedo Kutaisi	3–0	2–1
Skonto (Latvia)	0–2	(Bulgaria) Levski Sofia	0–0	0–2
Vardar (North Macedonia)	2–4	(Poland) Legia Warsaw	1–3	1–1
Hammarby IF (Sweden)	1–5	(Federal Republic of Yugoslavia) Partizan	1–1	0–4
Žilina (Slovakia)	1–4	(Switzerland) Basel	1–1	0–3
Maribor (Slovenia)	4–5	(Cyprus) APOEL	2–1	2–4
Lillestrøm (Norway)	0–2	(Bosnia and Herzegovina) Željezničar	0–1	0–1
Club Brugge (Belgium)	4–1	(Romania) Dinamo București	3–1	1–0
Brøndby (Denmark)	5–0	(Albania) Dinamo Tirana	1–0	4–0

=== Third qualifying round ===
Team 1	Agg.	Team 2	1st leg	2nd leg
Genk (Belgium)	4–4 (a)	(Czech Republic) Sparta Prague	2–0	2–4
Feyenoord (Netherlands)	3–0	(Turkey) Fenerbahçe	1–0	2–0
Maccabi Haifa (Israel)	5–3	(Austria) Sturm Graz	2–0	3–3
Boavista (Portugal)	0–1	(France) Auxerre	0–1	0–0
APOEL (Cyprus)	2–4	(Greece) AEK Athens	2–3	0–1
Zalaegerszeg (Hungary)	1–5	(England) Manchester United	1–0	0–5
Sporting CP (Portugal)	0–2	(Italy) Internazionale	0–0	0–2
Partizan (Federal Republic of Yugoslavia)	1–6	(Germany) Bayern Munich	0–3	1–3
Shakhtar Donetsk (Ukraine)	2–2 (1–4 p)	(Belgium) Club Brugge	1–1	1–1 (a.e.t.)
Željezničar (Bosnia and Herzegovina)	0–5	(England) Newcastle United	0–1	0–4
Celtic (Scotland)	3–3 (a)	(Switzerland) Basel	3–1	0–2
GAK (Austria)	3–5	(Russia) Lokomotiv Moscow	0–2	3–3
Rosenborg (Norway)	4–2	(Denmark) Brøndby	1–0	3–2
Levski Sofia (Bulgaria)	0–2	(Ukraine) Dynamo Kyiv	0–1	0–1
Milan (Italy)	2–2 (a)	(Czech Republic) Slovan Liberec	1–0	1–2
Barcelona (Spain)	4–0	(Poland) Legia Warsaw	3–0	1–0

== First group stage ==
Location of teams of the 2002–03 UEFA Champions League first group stage.
Brown: Group A; Red: Group B; Orange: Group C; Yellow: Group D;
Green: Group E; Blue: Group F; Purple: Group G; Pink: Group H.

16 winners from the third qualifying round, 10 champions from countries ranked 1–10, and six second-placed teams from countries ranked 1–6 were drawn into eight groups of four teams each. The top two teams in each group advance to the Champions League second group stage, while the third-placed teams advance to round three of the UEFA Cup.

Tiebreakers, if necessary, are applied in the following order:

1. Points earned in head-to-head matches between the tied teams.
2. Total goals scored in head-to-head matches between the tied teams.
3. Away goals scored in head-to-head matches between the tied teams.
4. Cumulative goal difference in all group matches.
5. Total goals scored in all group matches.
6. Higher UEFA coefficient going into the competition.

Basel, Genk and Maccabi Haifa made their debut in the group stage. Maccabi Haifa became the first Israeli club to qualify for the group stage.

=== Group A ===
Pos	Team	Pld	W	D	L	GF	GA	GD	Pts	Qualification	ARS	DOR	AUX	PSV
1	(England) Arsenal	6	3	1	2	9	4	+5	10	Advance to second group stage	—	2–0	1–2	0–0
2	(Germany) Borussia Dortmund	6	3	1	2	8	7	+1	10	Advance to second group stage	2–1	—	2–1	1–1
3	(France) Auxerre	6	2	1	3	4	7	−3	7	Transfer to UEFA Cup	0–1	1–0	—	0–0
4	(Netherlands) PSV Eindhoven	6	1	3	2	5	8	−3	6		0–4	1–3	3–0	—

Source: RSSSF

=== Group B ===
Pos	Team	Pld	W	D	L	GF	GA	GD	Pts	Qualification	VAL	BSL	LIV	SPM
1	(Spain) Valencia	6	5	1	0	17	4	+13	16	Advance to second group stage	—	6–2	2–0	3–0
2	(Switzerland) Basel	6	2	3	1	12	12	0	9	Advance to second group stage	2–2	—	3–3	2–0
3	(England) Liverpool	6	2	2	2	12	8	+4	8	Transfer to UEFA Cup	0–1	1–1	—	5–0
4	(Russia) Spartak Moscow	6	0	0	6	1	18	−17	0		0–3	0–2	1–3	—

Source: RSSSF

=== Group C ===
Pos	Team	Pld	W	D	L	GF	GA	GD	Pts	Qualification	RMA	ROM	AEK	GNK
1	(Spain) Real Madrid	6	2	3	1	15	7	+8	9	Advance to second group stage	—	0–1	2–2	6–0
2	(Italy) Roma	6	2	3	1	3	4	−1	9	Advance to second group stage	0–3	—	1–1	0–0
3	(Greece) AEK Athens	6	0	6	0	7	7	0	6	Transfer to UEFA Cup	3–3	0–0	—	1–1
4	(Belgium) Genk	6	0	4	2	2	9	−7	4		1–1	0–1	0–0	—

Source: RSSSF

=== Group D ===
Pos	Team	Pld	W	D	L	GF	GA	GD	Pts	Qualification	INT	AJX	LYO	ROS
1	(Italy) Internazionale	6	3	2	1	12	8	+4	11	Advance to second group stage	—	1–0	1–2	3–0
2	(Netherlands) Ajax	6	2	2	2	6	5	+1	8	Advance to second group stage	1–2	—	2–1	1–1
3	(France) Lyon	6	2	2	2	12	9	+3	8	Transfer to UEFA Cup	3–3	0–2	—	5–0
4	(Norway) Rosenborg	6	0	4	2	4	12	−8	4		2–2	0–0	1–1	—

Source: RSSSF

=== Group E ===
Pos	Team	Pld	W	D	L	GF	GA	GD	Pts	Qualification	JUV	NEW	DKV	FEY
1	(Italy) Juventus	6	4	1	1	12	3	+9	13	Advance to second group stage	—	2–0	5–0	2–0
2	(England) Newcastle United	6	3	0	3	6	8	−2	9	Advance to second group stage	1–0	—	2–1	0–1
3	(Ukraine) Dynamo Kyiv	6	2	1	3	6	9	−3	7	Transfer to UEFA Cup	1–2	2–0	—	2–0
4	(Netherlands) Feyenoord	6	1	2	3	4	8	−4	5		1–1	2–3	0–0	—

Source: RSSSF

=== Group F ===
Pos	Team	Pld	W	D	L	GF	GA	GD	Pts	Qualification	MUN	LEV	MHA	OLY
1	(England) Manchester United	6	5	0	1	16	8	+8	15	Advance to second group stage	—	2–0	5–2	4–0
2	(Germany) Bayer Leverkusen	6	3	0	3	9	11	−2	9	Advance to second group stage	1–2	—	2–1	2–0
3	(Israel) Maccabi Haifa	6	2	1	3	12	12	0	7	Transfer to UEFA Cup	3–0	0–2	—	3–0
4	(Greece) Olympiacos	6	1	1	4	11	17	−6	4		2–3	6–2	3–3	—

Source: RSSSF

=== Group G ===
Pos	Team	Pld	W	D	L	GF	GA	GD	Pts	Qualification	MIL	DEP	LEN	BAY
1	(Italy) Milan	6	4	0	2	12	7	+5	12	Advance to second group stage	—	1–2	2–1	2–1
2	(Spain) Deportivo La Coruña	6	4	0	2	11	12	−1	12	Advance to second group stage	0–4	—	3–1	2–1
3	(France) Lens	6	2	2	2	11	11	0	8	Transfer to UEFA Cup	2–1	3–1	—	1–1
4	(Germany) Bayern Munich	6	0	2	4	9	13	−4	2		1–2	2–3	3–3	—

Source: RSSSF

=== Group H ===
Pos	Team	Pld	W	D	L	GF	GA	GD	Pts	Qualification	BAR	LMO	BRU	GAL
1	(Spain) Barcelona	6	6	0	0	13	4	+9	18	Advance to second group stage	—	1–0	3–2	3–1
2	(Russia) Lokomotiv Moscow	6	2	1	3	5	7	−2	7	Advance to second group stage	1–3	—	2–0	0–2
3	(Belgium) Club Brugge	6	1	2	3	5	7	−2	5	Transfer to UEFA Cup	0–1	0–0	—	3–1
4	(Turkey) Galatasaray	6	1	1	4	5	10	−5	4		0–2	1–2	0–0	—

Source: RSSSF

== Second group stage ==
The eight group winners and eight group runners-up were drawn into four groups, with each one containing two group winners and two group runners-up. The top two teams in each group advanced to the Champions League knockout stage.

Tiebreakers, if necessary, are applied in the following order:

1. Points earned in head-to-head matches between the tied teams.
2. Total goals scored in head-to-head matches between the tied teams.
3. Away goals scored in head-to-head matches between the tied teams.
4. Cumulative goal difference in all group matches.
5. Total goals scored in all group matches.
6. Higher UEFA coefficient going into the competition.

=== Group A ===
Pos	Team	Pld	W	D	L	GF	GA	GD	Pts	Qualification	BAR	INT	NEW	LEV
1	(Spain) Barcelona	6	5	1	0	12	2	+10	16	Advance to knockout stage	—	3–0	3–1	2–0
2	(Italy) Internazionale	6	3	2	1	11	8	+3	11	Advance to knockout stage	0–0	—	2–2	3–2
3	(England) Newcastle United	6	2	1	3	10	13	−3	7		0–2	1–4	—	3–1
4	(Germany) Bayer Leverkusen	6	0	0	6	5	15	−10	0		1–2	0–2	1–3	—

Source: RSSSF

=== Group B ===
Pos	Team	Pld	W	D	L	GF	GA	GD	Pts	Qualification	VAL	AJX	ARS	ROM
1	(Spain) Valencia	6	2	3	1	5	6	−1	9	Advance to knockout stage	—	1–1	2–1	0–3
2	(Netherlands) Ajax	6	1	5	0	6	5	+1	8	Advance to knockout stage	1–1	—	0–0	2–1
3	(England) Arsenal	6	1	4	1	6	5	+1	7		0–0	1–1	—	1–1
4	(Italy) Roma	6	1	2	3	7	8	−1	5		0–1	1–1	1–3	—

Source: RSSSF

=== Group C ===
Pos	Team	Pld	W	D	L	GF	GA	GD	Pts	Qualification	MIL	RMA	DOR	LMO
1	(Italy) Milan	6	4	0	2	5	4	+1	12	Advance to knockout stage	—	1–0	0–1	1–0
2	(Spain) Real Madrid	6	3	2	1	9	6	+3	11	Advance to knockout stage	3–1	—	2–1	2–2
3	(Germany) Borussia Dortmund	6	3	1	2	8	5	+3	10		0–1	1–1	—	3–0
4	(Russia) Lokomotiv Moscow	6	0	1	5	3	10	−7	1		0–1	0–1	1–2	—

Source: RSSSF

=== Group D ===
Pos	Team	Pld	W	D	L	GF	GA	GD	Pts	Qualification	MUN	JUV	BSL	DEP
1	(England) Manchester United	6	4	1	1	11	5	+6	13	Advance to knockout stage	—	2–1	1–1	2–0
2	(Italy) Juventus	6	2	1	3	11	11	0	7	Advance to knockout stage	0–3	—	4–0	3–2
3	(Switzerland) Basel	6	2	1	3	5	10	−5	7		1–3	2–1	—	1–0
4	(Spain) Deportivo La Coruña	6	2	1	3	7	8	−1	7		2–0	2–2	1–0	—

Source: RSSSF

== Knockout phase ==
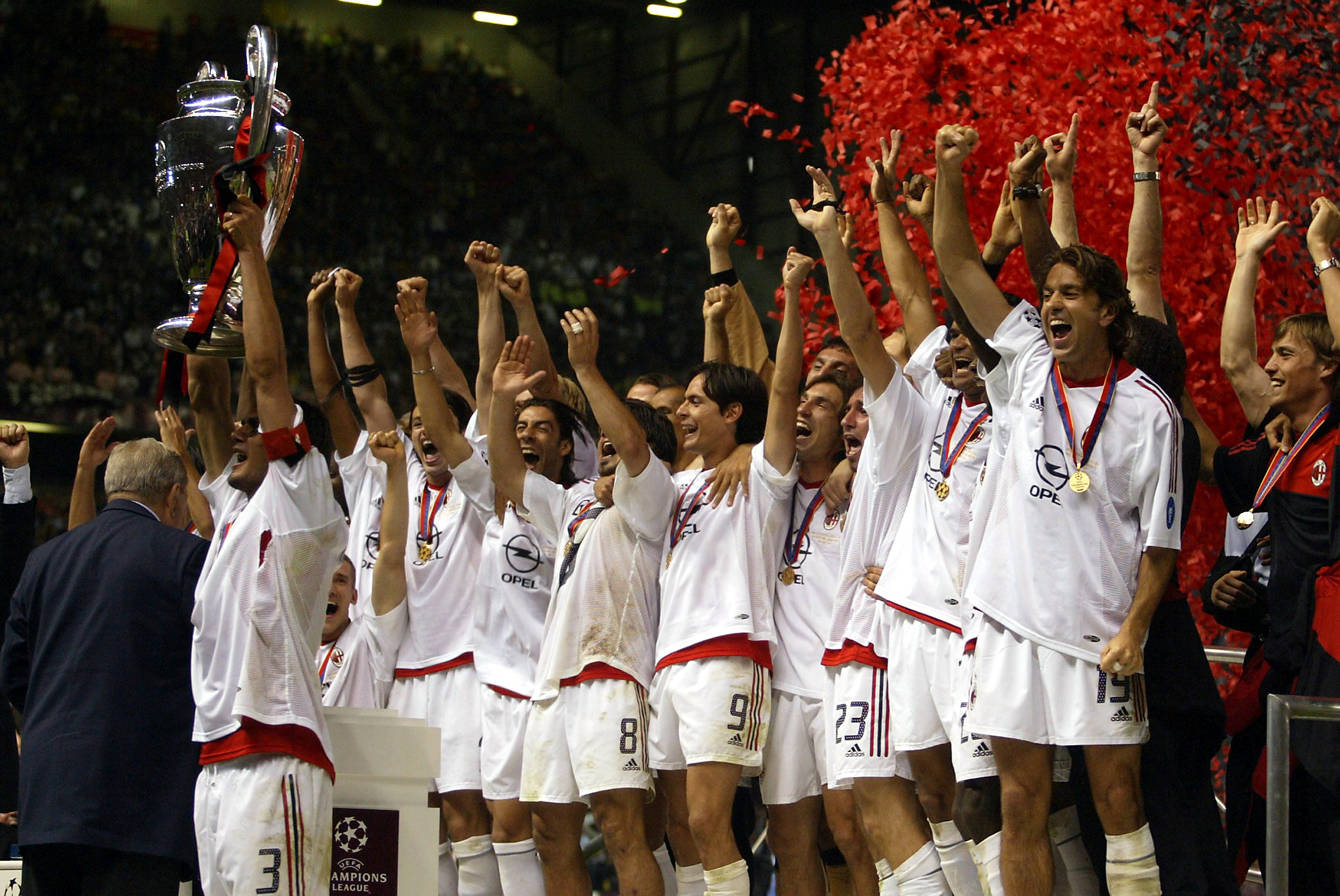
Milan raising the trophy.

=== Bracket ===
Quarter-finals
(Spain) Real Madrid	3	3	6
(England) Manchester United	1	4	5
(Italy) Juventus (a.e.t.)	1	2	3
(Spain) Barcelona	1	1	2
(Netherlands) Ajax	0	2	2
(Italy) Milan	0	3	3
(Italy) Inter Milan (a)	1	1	2
(Spain) Valencia	0	2	2

Semi-finals
(Spain) Real Madrid	2	1	3
(Italy) Juventus	1	3	4
(Italy) Milan (a)	0	1	1
(Italy) Inter Milan	0	1	1

Final
28 May – Manchester
(Italy) Juventus	0 (2)
(Italy) Milan (p)	0 (3)

=== Quarter-finals ===
Team 1	Agg.	Team 2	1st leg	2nd leg
Real Madrid (Spain)	6–5	(England) Manchester United	3–1	3–4
Ajax (Netherlands)	2–3	(Italy) Milan	0–0	2–3
Internazionale (Italy)	2–2 (a)	(Spain) Valencia	1–0	1–2
Juventus (Italy)	3–2	(Spain) Barcelona	1–1	2–1 (a.e.t.)

=== Semi-finals ===
Team 1	Agg.	Team 2	1st leg	2nd leg
Real Madrid (Spain)	3–4	(Italy) Juventus	2–1	1–3
Milan (Italy)	1–1 (a)	(Italy) Internazionale	0–0	1–1

=== Final ===
The final was played on 28 May 2003 at Old Trafford in Manchester, England.

28 May 2003
19:45 UTC+1

Juventus (Italy)	0–0 (a.e.t.)	(Italy) Milan
	Report
Penalties
Trezeguet (penalty missed); Birindelli (penalty scored); Zalayeta (penalty missed); Montero (penalty missed); Del Piero (penalty scored)	2–3	(penalty scored) Serginho; (penalty missed) Seedorf; (penalty missed) Kaladze; (penalty scored) Nesta; (penalty scored) Shevchenko

Old Trafford, Manchester
Attendance: 62,315
Referee: Markus Merk (Germany)

== Statistics ==
=== Top goalscorers ===
Rank	Name	Team	Goals	Appearances	Minutes played
1	(Netherlands) Ruud van Nistelrooy	(England) Manchester United	12	9	681
2	(Italy) Filippo Inzaghi	(Italy) Milan	10	14	1,097
3	(Netherlands) Roy Makaay	(Spain) Deportivo La Coruña	9	11	909
3	(Argentina) Hernán Crespo	(Italy) Internazionale	9	12	981
3	(Spain) Raúl	(Spain) Real Madrid	9	12	1,054
6	(Czech Republic) Jan Koller	(Germany) Borussia Dortmund	8	12	1,059
7	(Argentina) Javier Saviola	(Spain) Barcelona	7	12	914
7	(France) Thierry Henry	(England) Arsenal	7	12	1,020
9	(Brazil) Ronaldo	(Spain) Real Madrid	6	11	758
9	(England) Alan Shearer	(England) Newcastle United	6	10	878

== See also ==
- 2002–03 UEFA Cup
- 2003 Intercontinental Cup
- 2003 UEFA Super Cup
- 2002 UEFA Intertoto Cup
- 2002–03 UEFA Women's Cup
