= 2002–03 UEFA Champions League knockout stage =

International football competition

The knockout stage of the 2002–03 UEFA Champions League ran from 8 April 2003 until the final at Old Trafford in Manchester, England, on 28 May 2003. The knockout stage involved the eight teams who finished in the top two in each of their groups in the second group stage.

Each tie in the knockout stage, apart from the final, was played over two legs, with each team playing one leg at home. The team that has the higher aggregate score over the two legs will progress to the next round. If aggregate scores finish level, the team that scored more goals away from home over the two legs will progress. If away goals are also equal, 30 minutes of extra time are played. If there are goals scored during extra time and the aggregate score is still level, the visiting team qualifies by more away goals scored. If no goals are scored during extra time, there will be a penalty shoot-out after extra time.

In the draw for the quarter-finals, matches are played between the winner of one group and the runner-up of a different group, with the group winner hosting the second leg.

In the final, the tie was played over just one leg at a neutral venue. If scores were level at the end of normal time in the final, then 30 minutes of silver goal extra time was applied, whereby the team who leads the game at the half-time break during the extra period would be declared the winner. If the scores were still level after the initial 15 minutes of extra time, the play would continue for a further 15 minutes. If teams still tied, the tie was decided by penalty shoot-out.

Times are CEST (UTC+2) as listed by UEFA (local times, if different, are in parentheses).

== Qualified teams ==
The knockout staged involved the eight teams which qualified as winners and runners-up of each of the four groups in the second group stage.

Group	Winners (seeded in quarter-final draw)	Runners-up (unseeded in quarter-final draw)
A	(Spain) Barcelona	(Italy) Internazionale
B	(Spain) Valencia	(Netherlands) Ajax
C	(Italy) Milan	(Spain) Real Madrid
D	(England) Manchester United	(Italy) Juventus

== Bracket ==
Quarter-finals
(Spain) Real Madrid	3	3	6
(England) Manchester United	1	4	5
(Italy) Juventus (a.e.t.)	1	2	3
(Spain) Barcelona	1	1	2
(Netherlands) Ajax	0	2	2
(Italy) Milan	0	3	3
(Italy) Inter Milan (a)	1	1	2
(Spain) Valencia	0	2	2

Semi-finals
(Spain) Real Madrid	2	1	3
(Italy) Juventus	1	3	4
(Italy) Milan (a)	0	1	1
(Italy) Inter Milan	0	1	1

Final
28 May – Manchester
(Italy) Juventus	0 (2)
(Italy) Milan (p)	0 (3)

== Quarter-finals ==
=== Summary ===
Team 1	Agg.	Team 2	1st leg	2nd leg
Real Madrid (Spain)	6–5	(England) Manchester United	3–1	3–4
Ajax (Netherlands)	2–3	(Italy) Milan	0–0	2–3
Internazionale (Italy)	2–2 (a)	(Spain) Valencia	1–0	1–2
Juventus (Italy)	3–2	(Spain) Barcelona	1–1	2–1 (a.e.t.)

=== Matches ===
8 April 2003
20:45

Real Madrid (Spain)	3–1	(England) Manchester United
Figo 12'; Raúl 28', 49'	Report	Van Nistelrooy 52'

Santiago Bernabéu, Madrid
Attendance: 74,663
Referee: Anders Frisk (Sweden)
23 April 2003
20:45 (19:45 UTC+1)

Manchester United (England)	4–3	(Spain) Real Madrid
Van Nistelrooy 43'; Helguera 52' (o.g.); Beckham 71', 85'	Report	Ronaldo 12', 50', 59'

Old Trafford, Manchester
Attendance: 66,708
Referee: Pierluigi Collina (Italy)

Real Madrid won 6–5 on aggregate.

8 April 2003
20:45

Ajax (Netherlands)	0–0	(Italy) Milan
	Report

Amsterdam Arena, Amsterdam
Attendance: 50,967
Referee: Terje Hauge (Norway)
23 April 2003
20:45

Milan (Italy)	3–2	(Netherlands) Ajax
Inzaghi 30'; Shevchenko 65'; Tomasson 90+1'	Report	Litmanen 63'; Pienaar 78'

San Siro, Milan
Attendance: 76,079
Referee: Manuel Mejuto González (Spain)

Milan won 3–2 on aggregate.

9 April 2003
20:45

Internazionale (Italy)	1–0	(Spain) Valencia
Vieri 14'	Report

San Siro, Milan
Attendance: 52,623
Referee: Markus Merk (Germany)
22 April 2003
20:45

Valencia (Spain)	2–1	(Italy) Internazionale
Aimar 7'; Baraja 51'	Report	Vieri 5'

Mestalla, Valencia
Attendance: 43,802
Referee: Kim Milton Nielsen (Denmark)

2–2 on aggregate; Internazionale won on away goals.

9 April 2003
20:45

Juventus (Italy)	1–1	(Spain) Barcelona
Montero 16'	Report	Saviola 78'

Stadio delle Alpi, Turin
Attendance: 48,783
Referee: Ľuboš Micheľ (Slovakia)
22 April 2003
20:45

Barcelona (Spain)	1–2 (a.e.t.)	(Italy) Juventus
Xavi 66'	Report	Nedvěd 53'; Zalayeta 114'

Camp Nou, Barcelona
Attendance: 92,711
Referee: Graham Poll (England)

Juventus won 3–2 on aggregate.

== Semi-finals ==
=== Summary ===
For the Milan v Internazionale tie, both clubs played their home leg in the same stadium (the San Siro), but Milan were the designated away side in the second leg, and thus won on away goals.

Team 1	Agg.	Team 2	1st leg	2nd leg
Real Madrid (Spain)	3–4	(Italy) Juventus	2–1	1–3
Milan (Italy)	1–1 (a)	(Italy) Internazionale	0–0	1–1

=== Matches ===
6 May 2003
20:45

Real Madrid (Spain)	2–1	(Italy) Juventus
Ronaldo 23'; Roberto Carlos 73'	Report	Trezeguet 45'

Santiago Bernabéu, Madrid
Attendance: 74,773
Referee: Terje Hauge (Norway)
14 May 2003
20:45

Juventus (Italy)	3–1	(Spain) Real Madrid
Trezeguet 12'; Del Piero 43'; Nedvěd 73'	Report	Zidane 89'

Stadio delle Alpi, Turin
Attendance: 65,377
Referee: Urs Meier (Switzerland)

Juventus won 4–3 on aggregate.

7 May 2003
20:45

Milan (Italy)	0–0	(Italy) Internazionale
	Report

San Siro, Milan
Attendance: 77,049
Referee: Valentin Ivanov (Russia)
13 May 2003
20:45

Internazionale (Italy)	1–1	(Italy) Milan
Martins 84'	Report	Shevchenko 45+1'

San Siro, Milan
Attendance: 78,175
Referee: Gilles Veissière (France)

1–1 on aggregate; Milan won on away goals.

== Final ==
The final was played on 28 May 2003 at Old Trafford in Manchester, England.

28 May 2003
20:45 (19:45 UTC+1)

Juventus (Italy)	0–0 (a.e.t.)	(Italy) Milan
	Report
Penalties
Trezeguet (penalty missed); Birindelli (penalty scored); Zalayeta (penalty missed); Montero (penalty missed); Del Piero (penalty scored)	2–3	(penalty scored) Serginho; (penalty missed) Seedorf; (penalty missed) Kaladze; (penalty scored) Nesta; (penalty scored) Shevchenko

Old Trafford, Manchester
Attendance: 62,315
Referee: Markus Merk (Germany)
