= 2002–03 UEFA Champions League second group stage =

International football competition

The 2002–03 UEFA Champions League second group stage matches took place between 26 November 2002 and 19 March 2003. The second group stage featured the eight group winners and eight group runners-up from the group stage. Each team was drawn into one of four groups, each of which featured three other clubs. All four teams in the group played home and away matches against each other to determine the winner and runner-up in the group.

At the completion of the second group stage, the top two teams in each group advanced to the quarter-finals, while the other two teams were eliminated from European competition.

== Teams ==
The winners of the first group stage groups are put into seeded pots 1 and 2 according to their UEFA coefficients. The four group-winners with the best coefficients will go into seed pot 1. The eight group runners-up will be put into seed pots 3 and 4 according to the same principle, i.e. the four clubs with the best coefficients will go into seed pot 3. One club from each seed pot will be drawn into each of the four groups. Clubs from the same association cannot be drawn into the same group and group-winners and runners-up from the same first-stage group will not be drawn into the same group again.

Key to colours in group tables
Group winners and runners-up advance to the knockout stage

Pot 1 (higher-coefficient group winners)
Team	Coeff.
(Spain) Real Madrid	147.223
(England) Manchester United	125.729
(Spain) Barcelona	115.233
(Spain) Valencia	106.233

Pot 2 (lower-coefficient group winners)
Team	Coeff.
(Italy) Juventus	91.334
(England) Arsenal	90.729
(Italy) Internazionale	88.334
(Italy) Milan	69.334

Pot 3 (higher-coefficient group runners-up)
Team	Coeff.
(Spain) Deportivo La Coruña	82.233
(Germany) Bayer Leverkusen	81.495
(Italy) Roma	77.334
(Germany) Borussia Dortmund	73.495

Pot 4 (lower-coefficient group runners-up)
Team	Coeff.
(Russia) Lokomotiv Moscow	57.645
(Netherlands) Ajax	48.082
(England) Newcastle United	43.729
(Switzerland) Basel	14.312

Notes

1. ^{TH} Champions League title holders

== Tie-breaking criteria ==
Based on Article 7.06 in the UEFA regulations, if two or more teams are equal on points on completion of the group matches, the following criteria will be applied to determine the rankings:

1. higher number of points obtained in the group matches played among the teams in question;
2. superior goal difference from the group matches played among the teams in question;
3. higher number of goals scored away from home in the group matches played among the teams in question;
4. superior goal difference from all group matches played;
5. higher number of goals scored;
6. higher number of coefficient points accumulated by the club in question, as well as its association, over the previous five seasons.

== Groups ==
Times are CET (UTC+1) as listed by UEFA (local times, if different, are in parentheses).

=== Group A ===
Pos	Team	Pld	W	D	L	GF	GA	GD	Pts	Qualification	BAR	INT	NEW	LEV
1	(Spain) Barcelona	6	5	1	0	12	2	+10	16	Advance to knockout stage	—	3–0	3–1	2–0
2	(Italy) Internazionale	6	3	2	1	11	8	+3	11	Advance to knockout stage	0–0	—	2–2	3–2
3	(England) Newcastle United	6	2	1	3	10	13	−3	7		0–2	1–4	—	3–1
4	(Germany) Bayer Leverkusen	6	0	0	6	5	15	−10	0		1–2	0–2	1–3	—

Source: RSSSF
27 November 2002
20:45

Bayer Leverkusen (Germany)	1–2	(Spain) Barcelona
Berbatov 39'	Report	Saviola 48'; Overmars 88'

BayArena, Leverkusen
Attendance: 22,500
Referee: Kyros Vassaras (Greece)
27 November 2002
20:45 (19:45 UTC+0)

Newcastle United (England)	1–4	(Italy) Internazionale
Solano 72'	Report	Morfeo 2'; Almeyda 35'; Crespo 45'; Recoba 81'

St James' Park, Newcastle
Attendance: 50,108
Referee: Stéphane Bré (France)

10 December 2002
20:45

Internazionale (Italy)	3–2	(Germany) Bayer Leverkusen
Di Biagio 15', 27'; Butt 80' (o.g.)	Report	Živković 63'; França 90'

Stadio Giuseppe Meazza, Milan
Attendance: 36,462
Referee: Hugh Dallas (Scotland)
11 December 2002
20:45

Barcelona (Spain)	3–1	(England) Newcastle United
García 7'; Kluivert 35'; Motta 58'	Report	Ameobi 24'

Camp Nou, Barcelona
Attendance: 45,110
Referee: Frank De Bleeckere (Belgium)

18 February 2003
20:45

Barcelona (Spain)	3–0	(Italy) Internazionale
Saviola 7'; Cocu 29'; Kluivert 67'	Report

Camp Nou, Barcelona
Attendance: 82,417
Referee: Anders Frisk (Sweden)
18 February 2003
20:45

Bayer Leverkusen (Germany)	1–3	(England) Newcastle United
França 26'	Report	Ameobi 15', 16'; Lua Lua 32'

BayArena, Leverkusen
Attendance: 22,500
Referee: Terje Hauge (Norway)

26 February 2003
20:45

Internazionale (Italy)	0–0	(Spain) Barcelona
	Report

Stadio Giuseppe Meazza, Milan
Attendance: 78,856
Referee: Urs Meier (Switzerland)
26 February 2003
20:45 (19:45 UTC+0)

Newcastle United (England)	3–1	(Germany) Bayer Leverkusen
Shearer 5', 11', 36' (pen.)	Report	Babić 73'

St James' Park, Newcastle
Attendance: 40,508
Referee: Claus Bo Larsen (Denmark)

11 March 2003
20:45

Barcelona (Spain)	2–0	(Germany) Bayer Leverkusen
Saviola 17'; De Boer 49'	Report

Camp Nou, Barcelona
Attendance: 62,228
Referee: Stéphane Bré (France)
11 March 2003
20:45

Internazionale (Italy)	2–2	(England) Newcastle United
Vieri 47'; Córdoba 61'	Report	Shearer 42', 49'

Stadio Giuseppe Meazza, Milan
Attendance: 53,459
Referee: Lucílio Batista (Portugal)

19 March 2003
20:45

Bayer Leverkusen (Germany)	0–2	(Italy) Internazionale
	Report	Martins 36'; Emre 90'

BayArena, Leverkusen
Attendance: 22,500
Referee: Valentin Ivanov (Russia)
19 March 2003
20:45 (19:45 UTC+0)

Newcastle United (England)	0–2	(Spain) Barcelona
	Report	Kluivert 60'; Motta 75'

St James' Park, Newcastle
Attendance: 51,883
Referee: Jan Wegereef (Netherlands)

=== Group B ===
Pos	Team	Pld	W	D	L	GF	GA	GD	Pts	Qualification	VAL	AJX	ARS	ROM
1	(Spain) Valencia	6	2	3	1	5	6	−1	9	Advance to knockout stage	—	1–1	2–1	0–3
2	(Netherlands) Ajax	6	1	5	0	6	5	+1	8	Advance to knockout stage	1–1	—	0–0	2–1
3	(England) Arsenal	6	1	4	1	6	5	+1	7		0–0	1–1	—	1–1
4	(Italy) Roma	6	1	2	3	7	8	−1	5		0–1	1–1	1–3	—

Source: RSSSF
27 November 2002
20:45

Roma (Italy)	1–3	(England) Arsenal
Cassano 4'	Report	Henry 6', 70', 75'

Stadio Olimpico, Rome
Attendance: 49,860
Referee: Ľuboš Micheľ (Slovakia)
27 November 2002
20:45

Valencia (Spain)	1–1	(Netherlands) Ajax
Angulo 90'	Report	Ibrahimović 89'

Mestalla, Valencia
Attendance: 32,164
Referee: Gilles Veissière (France)

10 December 2002
20:45

Ajax (Netherlands)	2–1	(Italy) Roma
Ibrahimović 11'; Litmanen 66'	Report	Batistuta 89'

Amsterdam Arena, Amsterdam
Attendance: 51,980
Referee: Markus Merk (Germany)
10 December 2002
20:45 (19:45 UTC+0)

Arsenal (England)	0–0	(Spain) Valencia
	Report

Highbury, London
Attendance: 34,793
Referee: Kim Milton Nielsen (Denmark)

18 February 2003
20:45 (19:45 UTC+0)

Arsenal (England)	1–1	(Netherlands) Ajax
Wiltord 5'	Report	De Jong 17'

Highbury, London
Attendance: 35,427
Referee: Lucílio Batista (Portugal)
18 February 2003
20:45

Roma (Italy)	0–1	(Spain) Valencia
	Report	Carew 78'

Stadio Olimpico, Rome
Attendance: 30,599
Referee: Wolfgang Stark (Germany)

26 February 2003
20:45

Ajax (Netherlands)	0–0	(England) Arsenal
	Report

Amsterdam Arena, Amsterdam
Attendance: 51,026
Referee: Valentin Ivanov (Russia)
26 February 2003
20:45

Valencia (Spain)	0–3	(Italy) Roma
	Report	Totti 24', 30'; Emerson 36'

Mestalla, Valencia
Attendance: 35,175
Referee: Frank De Bleeckere (Belgium)

11 March 2003
20:45

Ajax (Netherlands)	1–1	(Spain) Valencia
Pasanen 56'	Report	Kily González 28' (pen.)

Amsterdam Arena, Amsterdam
Attendance: 48,633
Referee: Ľuboš Micheľ (Slovakia)
11 March 2003
20:45 (19:45 UTC+0)

Arsenal (England)	1–1	(Italy) Roma
Vieira 12'	Report	Cassano 45+2'

Highbury, London
Attendance: 35,472
Referee: Urs Meier (Switzerland)

19 March 2003
20:45

Roma (Italy)	1–1	(Netherlands) Ajax
Cassano 24'	Report	Van der Meyde 1'

Stadio Olimpico, Rome
Attendance: 54,502
Referee: Herbert Fandel (Germany)
19 March 2003
20:45

Valencia (Spain)	2–1	(England) Arsenal
Carew 34', 57'	Report	Henry 49'

Mestalla, Valencia
Attendance: 44,151
Referee: Kyros Vassaras (Greece)

=== Group C ===
Pos	Team	Pld	W	D	L	GF	GA	GD	Pts	Qualification	MIL	RMA	DOR	LMO
1	(Italy) Milan	6	4	0	2	5	4	+1	12	Advance to knockout stage	—	1–0	0–1	1–0
2	(Spain) Real Madrid	6	3	2	1	9	6	+3	11	Advance to knockout stage	3–1	—	2–1	2–2
3	(Germany) Borussia Dortmund	6	3	1	2	8	5	+3	10		0–1	1–1	—	3–0
4	(Russia) Lokomotiv Moscow	6	0	1	5	3	10	−7	1		0–1	0–1	1–2	—

Source: RSSSF
26 November 2002
18:45 (20:45 UTC+3)

Lokomotiv Moscow (Russia)	1–2	(Germany) Borussia Dortmund
Ignashevich 31'	Report	Frings 33'; Koller 43'

Lokomotiv Stadium, Moscow
Attendance: 23,000
Referee: René Temmink (Netherlands)
26 November 2002
20:45

Milan (Italy)	1–0	(Spain) Real Madrid
Shevchenko 40'	Report

Stadio Giuseppe Meazza, Milan
Attendance: 75,777
Referee: Urs Meier (Switzerland)

11 December 2002
20:45

Borussia Dortmund (Germany)	0–1	(Italy) Milan
	Report	Inzaghi 49'

Westfalenstadion, Dortmund
Attendance: 52,000
Referee: Anders Frisk (Sweden)
11 December 2002
20:45

Real Madrid (Spain)	2–2	(Russia) Lokomotiv Moscow
Raúl 21', 76'	Report	Obiorah 47'; Mnguni 74'

Santiago Bernabéu, Madrid
Attendance: 51,313
Referee: Graham Barber (England)

19 February 2003
20:45

Real Madrid (Spain)	2–1	(Germany) Borussia Dortmund
Raúl 43'; Ronaldo 56'	Report	Koller 30'

Santiago Bernabéu, Madrid
Attendance: 63,211
Referee: Ľuboš Micheľ (Slovakia)
19 February 2003
20:45

Milan (Italy)	1–0	(Russia) Lokomotiv Moscow
Tomasson 62'	Report

Stadio Giuseppe Meazza, Milan
Attendance: 72,028
Referee: Gilles Veissière (France)

25 February 2003
18:00 (20:00 UTC+3)

Lokomotiv Moscow (Russia)	0–1	(Italy) Milan
	Report	Rivaldo 34' (pen.)

Lokomotiv Stadium, Moscow
Attendance: 27,000
Referee: Kyros Vassaras (Greece)
25 February 2003
20:45

Borussia Dortmund (Germany)	1–1	(Spain) Real Madrid
Koller 23'	Report	Portillo 90+2'

Westfalenstadion, Dortmund
Attendance: 52,400
Referee: Graham Poll (England)

12 March 2003
20:45

Real Madrid (Spain)	3–1	(Italy) Milan
Raúl 12', 57'; Guti 86'	Report	Rivaldo 81'

Santiago Bernabéu, Madrid
Attendance: 77,824
Referee: Kim Milton Nielsen (Denmark)
12 March 2003
20:45

Borussia Dortmund (Germany)	3–0	(Russia) Lokomotiv Moscow
Frings 39'; Koller 58'; Amoroso 66'	Report

Westfalenstadion, Dortmund
Attendance: 48,000
Referee: Frank De Bleeckere (Belgium)

18 March 2003
18:30

Milan (Italy)	0–1	(Germany) Borussia Dortmund
	Report	Koller 80'

Stadio Giuseppe Meazza, Milan
Attendance: 70,577
Referee: Graham Barber (England)
18 March 2003
18:30 (20:30 UTC+3)

Lokomotiv Moscow (Russia)	0–1	(Spain) Real Madrid
	Report	Ronaldo 35'

Lokomotiv Stadium, Moscow
Attendance: 26,000
Referee: Claude Colombo (France)

=== Group D ===
Pos	Team	Pld	W	D	L	GF	GA	GD	Pts	Qualification	MUN	JUV	BSL	DEP
1	(England) Manchester United	6	4	1	1	11	5	+6	13	Advance to knockout stage	—	2–1	1–1	2–0
2	(Italy) Juventus	6	2	1	3	11	11	0	7	Advance to knockout stage	0–3	—	4–0	3–2
3	(Switzerland) Basel	6	2	1	3	5	10	−5	7		1–3	2–1	—	1–0
4	(Spain) Deportivo La Coruña	6	2	1	3	7	8	−1	7		2–0	2–2	1–0	—

Source: RSSSF
26 November 2002
20:45

Basel (Switzerland)	1–3	(England) Manchester United
Giménez 1'	Report	Van Nistelrooy 62', 63'; Solskjær 68'

St. Jakob-Park, Basel
Attendance: 29,501
Referee: Valentin Ivanov (Russia)
26 November 2002
20:45

Deportivo La Coruña (Spain)	2–2	(Italy) Juventus
Tristán 9'; Makaay 11'	Report	Birindelli 38'; Nedvěd 57'

Estadio Riazor, A Coruña
Attendance: 27,019
Referee: Herbert Fandel (Germany)

11 December 2002
20:45

Juventus (Italy)	4–0	(Switzerland) Basel
Trezeguet 3'; Montero 34'; Tacchinardi 43'; Del Piero 51' (pen.)	Report

Stadio delle Alpi, Turin
Attendance: 22,639
Referee: Lucílio Batista (Portugal)
11 December 2002
20:45 (19:45 UTC+0)

Manchester United (England)	2–0	(Spain) Deportivo La Coruña
Van Nistelrooy 7', 55'	Report

Old Trafford, Manchester
Attendance: 67,014
Referee: Terje Hauge (Norway)

19 February 2003
20:45 (19:45 UTC+0)

Manchester United (England)	2–1	(Italy) Juventus
Brown 4'; Van Nistelrooy 85'	Report	Nedvěd 90+2'

Old Trafford, Manchester
Attendance: 66,703
Referee: Kim Milton Nielsen (Denmark)
19 February 2003
20:45

Basel (Switzerland)	1–0	(Spain) Deportivo La Coruña
H. Yakin 30'	Report

St. Jakob-Park, Basel
Attendance: 29,031
Referee: René Temmink (Netherlands)

25 February 2003
20:45

Juventus (Italy)	0–3	(England) Manchester United
	Report	Giggs 15', 41'; Van Nistelrooy 63'

Stadio Delle Alpi, Turin
Attendance: 59,111
Referee: Markus Merk (Germany)
25 February 2003
20:45

Deportivo La Coruña (Spain)	1–0	(Switzerland) Basel
Tristán 4'	Report

Estadio Riazor, A Coruña
Attendance: 24,462
Referee: Stéphane Bré (France)

12 March 2003
20:45 (19:45 UTC+0)

Manchester United (England)	1–1	(Switzerland) Basel
G. Neville 53'	Report	Giménez 14'

Old Trafford, Manchester
Attendance: 66,870
Referee: Claus Bo Larsen (Denmark)
12 March 2003
20:45

Juventus (Italy)	3–2	(Spain) Deportivo La Coruña
Ferrara 13'; Trezeguet 63'; Tudor 90+3'	Report	Tristán 34'; Makaay 52'

Stadio delle Alpi, Turin
Attendance: 25,070
Referee: Anders Frisk (Sweden)

18 March 2003
20:45

Basel (Switzerland)	2–1	(Italy) Juventus
Cantaluppi 38'; Giménez 90+2'	Report	Tacchinardi 10'

St. Jakob-Park, Basel
Attendance: 30,501
Referee: Wolfgang Stark (Germany)
18 March 2003
20:45

Deportivo La Coruña (Spain)	2–0	(England) Manchester United
Victor 32'; Lynch 47' (o.g.)	Report

Estadio Riazor, A Coruña
Attendance: 25,984
Referee: Vladimír Hriňák (Slovakia)
