= 2002–03 UEFA Champions League first group stage =

The 2002–03 UEFA Champions League first group stage matches took place between 17 September and 13 November 2002. The draw for the group stage was made on 29 August 2002 in Monaco.

The group stage featured the 16 automatic qualifiers and the 16 winners of the third qualifying round. Each team was drawn into one of eight groups but avoided teams from their own country. All four teams in the group played home and away matches against each other to determine the winner and runner-up in the group.

At the completion of the group stage, the top two teams in each group advanced to play in a second group stage, while the third-placed teams dropped down to the UEFA Cup.

== Teams ==
Seeding was determined by the UEFA coefficients. Clubs from the same association were paired up to split the matchdays between Tuesday and Wednesday. Clubs with the same pairing letter would play on different days, ensuring that teams from the same city (e.g. Milan and Internazionale, who also share a stadium) did not play on the same day.

Key to colors
Teams advance to the second group stage
Teams enter the UEFA Cup round of 32

Pot 1
Team	Notes	Coeff.
(Spain) Real Madrid		147.223
(Germany) Bayern Munich		133.495
(Spain) Barcelona		116.233
(England) Manchester United		111.899
(Spain) Valencia		106.233
(Italy) Juventus		91.334
(England) Arsenal		90.729
(Italy) Internazionale		88.334

Pot 2
Team	Notes	Coeff.
(Spain) Deportivo La Coruña		82.233
(Germany) Bayer Leverkusen		81.495
(England) Liverpool		79.729
(Turkey) Galatasaray		78.362
(Italy) Roma		77.334
(France) Lyon		74.176
(Germany) Borussia Dortmund		73.495
(Netherlands) Feyenoord		70.082

Pot 3
Team	Notes	Coeff.
(Italy) Milan		69.334
(Netherlands) PSV Eindhoven		63.082
(Ukraine) Dynamo Kyiv		59.979
(Russia) Spartak Moscow		59.645
(Russia) Lokomotiv Moscow		57.645
(Greece) Olympiacos		55.058
(Greece) AEK Athens		52.058
(Netherlands) Ajax		48.082

Pot 4
Team	Notes	Coeff.
(Norway) Rosenborg		47.737
(France) Lens		44.176
(England) Newcastle United		43.729
(Belgium) Club Brugge		41.762
(France) Auxerre		32.176
(Belgium) Genk		21.762
(Israel) Maccabi Haifa		18.666
(Switzerland) Basel		14.312

Notes

1. ^{TH} Champions League title holders (automatic top seed of pot 1)
2. ^{Q3} Winners of the third qualifying round

== Tie-breaking criteria ==
Based on Article 7.06 in the UEFA regulations, if two or more teams are equal on points on completion of the group matches, the following criteria will be applied to determine the rankings:

1. higher number of points obtained in the group matches played among the teams in question;
2. superior goal difference from the group matches played among the teams in question;
3. higher number of goals scored away from home in the group matches played among the teams in question;
4. superior goal difference from all group matches played;
5. higher number of goals scored;
6. higher number of coefficient points accumulated by the club in question, as well as its association, over the previous five seasons.

== Groups ==
Times are CET/CEST, (Note: CET (UTC+1) for matches from 29 October 2002, and CEST (UTC+2) for matches to 23 October 2002.) as listed by UEFA (local times, if different, are in parentheses).

=== Group A ===
Pos	Team	Pld	W	D	L	GF	GA	GD	Pts	Qualification	ARS	DOR	AUX	PSV
1	(England) Arsenal	6	3	1	2	9	4	+5	10	Advance to second group stage	—	2–0	1–2	0–0
2	(Germany) Borussia Dortmund	6	3	1	2	8	7	+1	10	Advance to second group stage	2–1	—	2–1	1–1
3	(France) Auxerre	6	2	1	3	4	7	−3	7	Transfer to UEFA Cup	0–1	1–0	—	0–0
4	(Netherlands) PSV Eindhoven	6	1	3	2	5	8	−3	6		0–4	1–3	3–0	—

Source: RSSSF
17 September 2002
20:45

Auxerre (France)	0–0	(Netherlands) PSV Eindhoven
	Report

Stade l'Abbé-Deschamps, Auxerre
Attendance: 11,902
Referee: Alfredo Trentalange (Italy)
17 September 2002
20:45 (19:45 UTC+1)

Arsenal (England)	2–0	(Germany) Borussia Dortmund
Bergkamp 62'; Ljungberg 77'	Report

Highbury, London
Attendance: 34,907
Referee: Anders Frisk (Sweden)

25 September 2002
20:45

Borussia Dortmund (Germany)	2–1	(France) Auxerre
Koller 6'; Amoroso 78'	Report	Benjani 83'

Westfalenstadion, Dortmund
Attendance: 46,500
Referee: Terje Hauge (Norway)
25 September 2002
20:45

PSV Eindhoven (Netherlands)	0–4	(England) Arsenal
	Report	Gilberto 1'; Ljungberg 66'; Henry 81', 90+2'

Philips Stadion, Eindhoven
Attendance: 29,500
Referee: Ľuboš Micheľ (Slovakia)

2 October 2002
20:45

PSV Eindhoven (Netherlands)	1–3	(Germany) Borussia Dortmund
Van der Schaaf 74'	Report	Koller 21'; Rosický 69'; Amoroso 90+2'

Philips Stadion, Eindhoven
Attendance: 26,100
Referee: Pierluigi Collina (Italy)
2 October 2002
20:45

Auxerre (France)	0–1	(England) Arsenal
	Report	Gilberto Silva 48'

Stade l'Abbé-Deschamps, Auxerre
Attendance: 19,454
Referee: Frank De Bleeckere (Belgium)

22 October 2002
20:45

Borussia Dortmund (Germany)	1–1	(Netherlands) PSV Eindhoven
Koller 10'	Report	Bruggink 47'

Westfalenstadion, Dortmund
Attendance: 47,000
Referee: Lucílio Batista (Portugal)
22 October 2002
20:45 (19:45 UTC+1)

Arsenal (England)	1–2	(France) Auxerre
Kanu 53'	Report	Kapo 8'; Fadiga 27'

Highbury, London
Attendance: 35,302
Referee: Domenico Messina (Italy)

30 October 2002
20:45

PSV Eindhoven (Netherlands)	3–0	(France) Auxerre
Bruggink 34'; Rommedahl 48'; Robben 64'	Report

Philips Stadion, Eindhoven
Attendance: 27,500
Referee: Knud Erik Fisker (Denmark)
30 October 2002
20:45

Borussia Dortmund (Germany)	2–1	(England) Arsenal
Rosický 38', 62' (pen.)	Report	Henry 18'

Westfalenstadion, Dortmund
Attendance: 51,200
Referee: Manuel Mejuto González (Spain)

12 November 2002
20:45

Auxerre (France)	1–0	(Germany) Borussia Dortmund
Benjani 76'	Report

Stade l'Abbé-Deschamps, Auxerre
Attendance: 16,959
Referee: Sorin Corpordean (Romania)
12 November 2002
20:45 (19:45 UTC+0)

Arsenal (England)	0–0	(Netherlands) PSV Eindhoven
	Report

Highbury, London
Attendance: 35,274
Referee: Tom Henning Øvrebø (Norway)

=== Group B ===
Pos	Team	Pld	W	D	L	GF	GA	GD	Pts	Qualification	VAL	BSL	LIV	SPM
1	(Spain) Valencia	6	5	1	0	17	4	+13	16	Advance to second group stage	—	6–2	2–0	3–0
2	(Switzerland) Basel	6	2	3	1	12	12	0	9	Advance to second group stage	2–2	—	3–3	2–0
3	(England) Liverpool	6	2	2	2	12	8	+4	8	Transfer to UEFA Cup	0–1	1–1	—	5–0
4	(Russia) Spartak Moscow	6	0	0	6	1	18	−17	0		0–3	0–2	1–3	—

Source: RSSSF
17 September 2002
20:45

Valencia (Spain)	2–0	(England) Liverpool
Aimar 20'; Baraja 38'	Report

Mestalla, Valencia
Attendance: 35,333
Referee: Herbert Fandel (Germany)
17 September 2002
20:45

Basel (Switzerland)	2–0	(Russia) Spartak Moscow
H. Yakin 50'; Rossi 55'	Report

St. Jakob-Park, Basel
Attendance: 29,500
Referee: Claus Bo Larsen (Denmark)

25 September 2002
18:00 (20:00 UTC+4)

Spartak Moscow (Russia)	0–3	(Spain) Valencia
	Report	Angulo 6'; Mista 71'; Juan Sánchez 85'

Dynamo Stadium, Moscow
Attendance: 10,100
Referee: Stéphane Bré (France)
25 September 2002
20:45 (19:45 UTC+1)

Liverpool (England)	1–1	(Switzerland) Basel
Baroš 34'	Report	Rossi 43'

Anfield, Liverpool
Attendance: 37,634
Referee: Dick van Egmond (Netherlands)

2 October 2002
20:45 (19:45 UTC+1)

Liverpool (England)	5–0	(Russia) Spartak Moscow
Heskey 7', 89'; Cheyrou 15'; Hyypiä 28'; Diao 81'	Report

Anfield, Liverpool
Attendance: 40,812
Referee: Alain Hamer (Luxembourg)
2 October 2002
20:45

Valencia (Spain)	6–2	(Switzerland) Basel
Carew 10', 13'; Aurélio 17'; Baraja 28'; Aimar 58'; Mista 60'	Report	Rossi 46'; H. Yakin 90'

Mestalla, Valencia
Attendance: 27,394
Referee: Cosimo Bolognino (Italy)

22 October 2002
18:00 (20:00 UTC+4)

Spartak Moscow (Russia)	1–3	(England) Liverpool
Danishevsky 23'	Report	Owen 29', 70', 90+1'

Dynamo Stadium, Moscow
Attendance: 10,000
Referee: Konrad Plautz (Austria)
22 October 2002
20:45

Basel (Switzerland)	2–2	(Spain) Valencia
Ergić 32', 90'	Report	Baraja 36'; Curro Torres 72'

St. Jakob-Park, Basel
Attendance: 29,503
Referee: Helmut Fleischer (Germany)

30 October 2002
20:45 (19:45 UTC+0)

Liverpool (England)	0–1	(Spain) Valencia
	Report	Rufete 34'

Anfield, Liverpool
Attendance: 41,831
Referee: Terje Hauge (Norway)
5 November 2002
18:00 (20:00 UTC+3)

Spartak Moscow (Russia)	0–2	(Switzerland) Basel
	Report	Rossi 18'; Giménez 89'

Dynamo Stadium, Moscow
Attendance: 3,500
Referee: Stuart Dougal (Scotland)

12 November 2002
20:45

Valencia (Spain)	3–0	(Russia) Spartak Moscow
Juan Sánchez 38', 46'; Aurélio 78'	Report

Mestalla, Valencia
Attendance: 26,378
Referee: Georgios Kasnaferis (Greece)
12 November 2002
20:45

Basel (Switzerland)	3–3	(England) Liverpool
Rossi 2'; Giménez 22'; Atouba 29'	Report	Murphy 61'; Šmicer 64'; Owen 85'

St. Jakob-Park, Basel
Attendance: 29,534
Referee: Claude Colombo (France)

=== Group C ===
Pos	Team	Pld	W	D	L	GF	GA	GD	Pts	Qualification	RMA	ROM	AEK	GNK
1	(Spain) Real Madrid	6	2	3	1	15	7	+8	9	Advance to second group stage	—	0–1	2–2	6–0
2	(Italy) Roma	6	2	3	1	3	4	−1	9	Advance to second group stage	0–3	—	1–1	0–0
3	(Greece) AEK Athens	6	0	6	0	7	7	0	6	Transfer to UEFA Cup	3–3	0–0	—	1–1
4	(Belgium) Genk	6	0	4	2	2	9	−7	4		1–1	0–1	0–0	—

Source: RSSSF
17 September 2002
20:45

Genk (Belgium)	0–0	(Greece) AEK Athens
	Report

Cristal Arena, Genk
Attendance: 22,000
Referee: Konrad Plautz (Austria)
17 September 2002
20:45

Roma (Italy)	0–3	(Spain) Real Madrid
	Report	Guti 41', 74'; Raúl 56'

Stadio Olimpico, Rome
Attendance: 71,130
Referee: Markus Merk (Germany)

25 September 2002
20:45

Real Madrid (Spain)	6–0	(Belgium) Genk
Zokora 44' (o.g.); Salgado 45+1'; Figo 55'; Guti 64'; Celades 74'; Raúl 76'	Report

Santiago Bernabéu, Madrid
Attendance: 65,309
Referee: Knud Erik Fisker (Denmark)
25 September 2002
20:45 (21:45 UTC+3)

AEK Athens (Greece)	0–0	(Italy) Roma
	Report

Nikos Goumas Stadium, Nea Filadelfeia
Attendance: 9,444
Referee: Graham Barber (England)

2 October 2002
20:45 (21:45 UTC+3)

AEK Athens (Greece)	3–3	(Spain) Real Madrid
Tsiartas 6'; Maladenis 25'; Nikolaidis 28'	Report	Zidane 15', 39'; Guti 60'

Nikos Goumas Stadium, Nea Filadelfeia
Attendance: 12,784
Referee: Valentin Ivanov (Russia)
2 October 2002
20:45

Genk (Belgium)	0–1	(Italy) Roma
	Report	Cassano 81'

Cristal Arena, Genk
Attendance: 22,260
Referee: Alain Sars (France)

22 October 2002
20:45

Real Madrid (Spain)	2–2	(Greece) AEK Athens
McManaman 24', 43'	Report	Katsouranis 74'; Centeno 86'

Santiago Bernabéu, Madrid
Attendance: 58,343
Referee: Herbert Fandel (Germany)
22 October 2002
20:45

Roma (Italy)	0–0	(Belgium) Genk
	Report

Stadio Olimpico, Rome
Attendance: 25,592
Referee: Željko Širić (FR Yugoslavia)

30 October 2002
20:45 (21:45 UTC+2)

AEK Athens (Greece)	1–1	(Belgium) Genk
Lakis 30'	Report	Sonck 22'

Nikos Goumas Stadium, Nea Filadelfeia
Attendance: 19,775
Referee: Massimo Busacca (Switzerland)
30 October 2002
20:45

Real Madrid (Spain)	0–1	(Italy) Roma
	Report	Totti 27'

Santiago Bernabéu, Madrid
Attendance: 72,035
Referee: Hugh Dallas (Scotland)

12 November 2002
20:45

Genk (Belgium)	1–1	(Spain) Real Madrid
Sonck 86'	Report	Tote 21'

Cristal Arena, Genk
Attendance: 21,723
Referee: Jacek Granat (Poland)
12 November 2002
20:45

Roma (Italy)	1–1	(Greece) AEK Athens
Delvecchio 40'	Report	Centeno 90'

Stadio Olimpico, Rome
Attendance: 32,734
Referee: Stéphane Bré (France)

=== Group D ===
Pos	Team	Pld	W	D	L	GF	GA	GD	Pts	Qualification	INT	AJX	LYO	ROS
1	(Italy) Internazionale	6	3	2	1	12	8	+4	11	Advance to second group stage	—	1–0	1–2	3–0
2	(Netherlands) Ajax	6	2	2	2	6	5	+1	8	Advance to second group stage	1–2	—	2–1	1–1
3	(France) Lyon	6	2	2	2	12	9	+3	8	Transfer to UEFA Cup	3–3	0–2	—	5–0
4	(Norway) Rosenborg	6	0	4	2	4	12	−8	4		2–2	0–0	1–1	—

Source: RSSSF
17 September 2002
20:45

Rosenborg (Norway)	2–2	(Italy) Internazionale
Karadas 52', 65'	Report	Crespo 33', 79'

Lerkendal Stadion, Trondheim
Attendance: 21,040
Referee: Juan Fernández Marin (Spain)
17 September 2002
20:45

Ajax (Netherlands)	2–1	(France) Lyon
Ibrahimović 11', 34'	Report	Anderson 84'

Amsterdam Arena, Amsterdam
Attendance: 37,104
Referee: Mike Riley (England)

25 September 2002
20:45

Lyon (France)	5–0	(Norway) Rosenborg
Carrière 6'; Vairelles 26', 45'; Anderson 34'; Luyindula 75'	Report

Stade de Gerland, Lyon
Attendance: 37,505
Referee: Franz-Xaver Wack (Germany)
25 September 2002
20:45

Internazionale (Italy)	1–0	(Netherlands) Ajax
Crespo 75'	Report

San Siro, Milan
Attendance: 45,784
Referee: Stuart Dougal (Scotland)

2 October 2002
20:45

Internazionale (Italy)	1–2	(France) Lyon
Cannavaro 73'	Report	Govou 21'; Anderson 60'

San Siro, Milan
Attendance: 31,448
Referee: Manuel Mejuto González (Spain)
2 October 2002
20:45

Rosenborg (Norway)	0–0	(Netherlands) Ajax
	Report

Lerkendal Stadion, Trondheim
Attendance: 20,948
Referee: Michal Beneš (Czech Republic)

22 October 2002
20:45

Lyon (France)	3–3	(Italy) Internazionale
Anderson 21', 75'; Carrière 44'	Report	Caçapa 31' (o.g.); Crespo 56', 66'

Stade de Gerland, Lyon
Attendance: 37,770
Referee: Kim Milton Nielsen (Denmark)
22 October 2002
20:45

Ajax (Netherlands)	1–1	(Norway) Rosenborg
Ibrahimović 41'	Report	Enerly 85' (pen.)

Amsterdam Arena, Amsterdam
Attendance: 42,026
Referee: Arturo Daudén Ibáñez (Spain)

30 October 2002
20:45

Internazionale (Italy)	3–0	(Norway) Rosenborg
Recoba 31'; Saarinen 52' (o.g.); Crespo 72'	Report

San Siro, Milan
Attendance: 33,686
Referee: Frank De Bleeckere (Belgium)
30 October 2002
20:45

Lyon (France)	0–2	(Netherlands) Ajax
	Report	Pienaar 7'; Van der Vaart 90+3'

Stade de Gerland, Lyon
Attendance: 38,134
Referee: Kyros Vassaras (Greece)

12 November 2002
20:45

Rosenborg (Norway)	1–1	(France) Lyon
Brattbakk 69'	Report	Govou 84'

Lerkendal Stadion, Trondheim
Attendance: 21,008
Referee: Hugh Dallas (Scotland)
12 November 2002
20:45

Ajax (Netherlands)	1–2	(Italy) Internazionale
Van der Vaart 90+4'	Report	Crespo 50', 52'

Amsterdam Arena, Amsterdam
Attendance: 50,272
Referee: Urs Meier (Switzerland)

=== Group E ===
Pos	Team	Pld	W	D	L	GF	GA	GD	Pts	Qualification	JUV	NEW	DKV	FEY
1	(Italy) Juventus	6	4	1	1	12	3	+9	13	Advance to second group stage	—	2–0	5–0	2–0
2	(England) Newcastle United	6	3	0	3	6	8	−2	9	Advance to second group stage	1–0	—	2–1	0–1
3	(Ukraine) Dynamo Kyiv	6	2	1	3	6	9	−3	7	Transfer to UEFA Cup	1–2	2–0	—	2–0
4	(Netherlands) Feyenoord	6	1	2	3	4	8	−4	5		1–1	2–3	0–0	—

Source: RSSSF
18 September 2002
20:45

Feyenoord (Netherlands)	1–1	(Italy) Juventus
Van Hooijdonk 75'	Report	Camoranesi 32'

De Kuip, Rotterdam
Attendance: 40,759
Referee: Antonio López Nieto (Spain)
18 September 2002
20:45 (21:45 UTC+3)

Dynamo Kyiv (Ukraine)	2–0	(England) Newcastle United
Shatskikh 17'; Khatskevich 62'	Report

Olimpiyskiy NSC, Kyiv
Attendance: 59,000
Referee: Eduardo Iturralde González (Spain)

24 September 2002
20:45 (19:45 UTC+1)

Newcastle United (England)	0–1	(Netherlands) Feyenoord
	Report	Pardo 4'

St James' Park, Newcastle
Attendance: 40,540
Referee: Claude Colombo (France)
24 September 2002
20:45

Juventus (Italy)	5–0	(Ukraine) Dynamo Kyiv
Di Vaio 14', 52'; Del Piero 22'; Davids 67'; Nedvěd 79'	Report

Stadio delle Alpi, Turin
Attendance: 26,876
Referee: Wolfgang Stark (Germany)

1 October 2002
20:45

Juventus (Italy)	2–0	(England) Newcastle United
Del Piero 66', 81'	Report

Stadio delle Alpi, Turin
Attendance: 41,424
Referee: René Temmink (Netherlands)
1 October 2002
20:45

Feyenoord (Netherlands)	0–0	(Ukraine) Dynamo Kyiv
	Report

De Kuip, Rotterdam
Attendance: 41,200
Referee: Tom Henning Øvrebø (Norway)

23 October 2002
20:45 (19:45 UTC+1)

Newcastle United (England)	1–0	(Italy) Juventus
Griffin 62'	Report

St James' Park, Newcastle
Attendance: 48,370
Referee: Rune Pedersen (Norway)
23 October 2002
20:45 (21:45 UTC+3)

Dynamo Kyiv (Ukraine)	2–0	(Netherlands) Feyenoord
Khatskevich 16'; Byalkevich 47'	Report

Olimpiyskiy NSC, Kyiv
Attendance: 73,880
Referee: Markus Merk (Germany)

29 October 2002
20:45

Juventus (Italy)	2–0	(Netherlands) Feyenoord
Di Vaio 4', 69'	Report

Stadio delle Alpi, Turin
Attendance: 35,789
Referee: Gilles Veissiere (France)
29 October 2002
20:45 (19:45 UTC+0)

Newcastle United (England)	2–1	(Ukraine) Dynamo Kyiv
Speed 58'; Shearer 69' (pen.)	Report	Shatskikh 47'

St James' Park, Newcastle
Attendance: 40,185
Referee: Juan Fernández Marin (Spain)

13 November 2002
20:45

Feyenoord (Netherlands)	2–3	(England) Newcastle United
Bombarda 65'; Lurling 71'	Report	Bellamy 45+1', 90+1'; Viana 49'

De Kuip, Rotterdam
Attendance: 45,000
Referee: Franz-Xaver Wack (Germany)
13 November 2002
20:45 (21:45 UTC+2)

Dynamo Kyiv (Ukraine)	1–2	(Italy) Juventus
Shatskikh 50'	Report	Salas 53'; Zalayeta 61'

Olimpiyskiy NSC, Kyiv
Attendance: 76,000
Referee: Claus Bo Larsen (Denmark)

=== Group F ===
Pos	Team	Pld	W	D	L	GF	GA	GD	Pts	Qualification	MUN	LEV	MHA	OLY
1	(England) Manchester United	6	5	0	1	16	8	+8	15	Advance to second group stage	—	2–0	5–2	4–0
2	(Germany) Bayer Leverkusen	6	3	0	3	9	11	−2	9	Advance to second group stage	1–2	—	2–1	2–0
3	(Israel) Maccabi Haifa	6	2	1	3	12	12	0	7	Transfer to UEFA Cup	3–0	0–2	—	3–0
4	(Greece) Olympiacos	6	1	1	4	11	17	−6	4		2–3	6–2	3–3	—

Source: RSSSF
18 September 2002
20:45 (19:45 UTC+1)

Manchester United (England)	5–2	(Israel) Maccabi Haifa
Giggs 10'; Solskjær 35'; Verón 46'; Van Nistelrooy 54'; Forlán 89' (pen.)	Report	Katan 8'; Cohen 85'

Old Trafford, Manchester
Attendance: 63,439
Referee: Paul Allaerts (Belgium)
18 September 2002
20:45 (21:45 UTC+3)

Olympiacos (Greece)	6–2	(Germany) Bayer Leverkusen
Kleine 27' (o.g.); Giannakopoulos 38'; Đorđević 44', 64' (pen.), 73'; Zetterberg 87'	Report	Eleftheropoulos 22' (o.g.); Schneider 78' (pen.)

Georgios Kamaras Stadium, Athens
Attendance: 12,909
Referee: Arturo Daudén Ibáñez (Spain)

24 September 2002
20:45

Bayer Leverkusen (Germany)	1–2	(England) Manchester United
Berbatov 52'	Report	Van Nistelrooy 31', 44'

BayArena, Leverkusen
Attendance: 21,094
Referee: Jan Wegereef (Netherlands)
24 September 2002
20:45 (21:45 UTC+3)

Maccabi Haifa (Israel)	3–0	(Greece) Olympiacos
Yakubu 27' (pen.), 60', 86'	Report

GSP Stadium, Nicosia, Cyprus (Note: Due to security issues caused by the Second Intifada, Israeli teams were required to play their home matches at neutral venues until further notice. As a result, Maccabi Haifa played their home matches at GSP Stadium, Nicosia, Cyprus, instead of their regular stadium, Kiryat Eliezer Stadium, Haifa.)
Attendance: 14,893
Referee: Massimo De Santis (Italy)

1 October 2002
20:45 (21:45 UTC+3)

Maccabi Haifa (Israel)	0–2	(Germany) Bayer Leverkusen
	Report	Babić 31', 64'

GSP Stadium, Nicosia, Cyprus
Attendance: 6,320
Referee: Jacek Granat (Poland)
1 October 2002
20:45 (19:45 UTC+1)

Manchester United (England)	4–0	(Greece) Olympiacos
Giggs 19', 66'; Verón 26'; Solskjær 77'	Report

Old Trafford, Manchester
Attendance: 66,902
Referee: Gilles Veissiere (France)

23 October 2002
20:45

Bayer Leverkusen (Germany)	2–1	(Israel) Maccabi Haifa
Babić 45'; Juan 67'	Report	Pralija 53'

BayArena, Leverkusen
Attendance: 22,500
Referee: Eric Poulat (France)
23 October 2002
20:45 (21:45 UTC+3)

Olympiacos (Greece)	2–3	(England) Manchester United
Choutos 70'; Đorđević 74'	Report	Blanc 21'; Verón 59'; Scholes 84'

Georgios Kamaras Stadium, Athens
Attendance: 14,072
Referee: Pierluigi Collina (Italy)

29 October 2002
20:45 (21:45 UTC+2)

Maccabi Haifa (Israel)	3–0	(England) Manchester United
Katan 40'; Žutautas 56'; Yakubu 77' (pen.)	Report

GSP Stadium, Nicosia, Cyprus
Attendance: 19,653
Referee: Antonio Jesús López Nieto (Spain)
29 October 2002
20:45

Bayer Leverkusen (Germany)	2–0	(Greece) Olympiacos
Juan 14'; Schneider 90' (pen.)	Report

BayArena, Leverkusen
Attendance: 22,500
Referee: Alfredo Trentalange (Italy)

13 November 2002
20:45 (19:45 UTC+0)

Manchester United (England)	2–0	(Germany) Bayer Leverkusen
Verón 42'; Van Nistelrooy 69'	Report

Old Trafford, Manchester
Attendance: 66,185
Referee: Vladimír Hriňák (Slovakia)
13 November 2002
20:45 (21:45 UTC+2)

Olympiacos (Greece)	3–3	(Israel) Maccabi Haifa
Alexandris 37'; Niniadis 51'; Antzas 79'	Report	Badir 9'; Yakubu 10'; Katan 41'

Georgios Kamaras Stadium, Athens
Attendance: 10,700
Referee: Rene Temmink (Netherlands)

=== Group G ===
Pos	Team	Pld	W	D	L	GF	GA	GD	Pts	Qualification	MIL	DEP	LEN	BAY
1	(Italy) Milan	6	4	0	2	12	7	+5	12	Advance to second group stage	—	1–2	2–1	2–1
2	(Spain) Deportivo La Coruña	6	4	0	2	11	12	−1	12	Advance to second group stage	0–4	—	3–1	2–1
3	(France) Lens	6	2	2	2	11	11	0	8	Transfer to UEFA Cup	2–1	3–1	—	1–1
4	(Germany) Bayern Munich	6	0	2	4	9	13	−4	2		1–2	2–3	3–3	—

Source: RSSSF
18 September 2002
20:45

Bayern Munich (Germany)	2–3	(Spain) Deportivo La Coruña
Salihamidžić 57'; Élber 64'	Report	Makaay 12', 45+1', 77'

Olympiastadion, Munich
Attendance: 40,000
Referee: Graham Poll (England)
18 September 2002
20:45

Milan (Italy)	2–1	(France) Lens
Inzaghi 57', 61'	Report	Moreira 75'

San Siro, Milan
Attendance: 70,214
Referee: Kyros Vassaras (Greece)

24 September 2002
20:45

Lens (France)	1–1	(Germany) Bayern Munich
Utaka 76'	Report	Linke 23'

Stade Félix-Bollaert, Lens
Attendance: 39,567
Referee: Lucílio Batista (Portugal)
24 September 2002
20:45

Deportivo La Coruña (Spain)	0–4	(Italy) Milan
	Report	Seedorf 17'; Inzaghi 33', 55', 62'

Estadio Riazor, A Coruña
Attendance: 27,614
Referee: Kim Milton Nielsen (Denmark)

1 October 2002
20:45

Deportivo La Coruña (Spain)	3–1	(France) Lens
Makaay 41'; Capdevila 79'; César 84'	Report	Moreira 10'

Estadio Riazor, A Coruña
Attendance: 24,734
Referee: Rune Pedersen (Norway)
1 October 2002
20:45

Bayern Munich (Germany)	1–2	(Italy) Milan
Pizarro 54'	Report	Inzaghi 52', 84'

Olympiastadion, Munich
Attendance: 59,000
Referee: Hugh Dallas (Scotland)

23 October 2002
20:45

Lens (France)	3–1	(Spain) Deportivo La Coruña
Coulibaly 61'; Moreira 79'; Thomert 84'	Report	Makaay 15'

Stade Félix-Bollaert, Lens
Attendance: 37,982
Referee: Valentin Ivanov (Russia)
23 October 2002
20:45

Milan (Italy)	2–1	(Germany) Bayern Munich
Serginho 11'; Inzaghi 64'	Report	Tarnat 23'

San Siro, Milan
Attendance: 75,611
Referee: Ľuboš Micheľ (Slovakia)

29 October 2002
20:45

Deportivo La Coruña (Spain)	2–1	(Germany) Bayern Munich
Sánchez 54'; Makaay 89'	Report	Santa Cruz 77'

Estadio Riazor, A Coruña
Attendance: 26,948
Referee: Anders Frisk (Sweden)
29 October 2002
20:45

Lens (France)	2–1	(Italy) Milan
Moreira 41'; Utaka 49'	Report	Shevchenko 31'

Stade Félix-Bollaert, Lens
Attendance: 39,474
Referee: Graham Barber (England)

13 November 2002
20:45

Bayern Munich (Germany)	3–3	(France) Lens
R. Kovač 6'; Warmuz 19' (o.g.); Feulner 87'	Report	Fink 20' (o.g.); Bakari 54'; Blanchard 90'

Olympiastadion, Munich
Attendance: 22,000
Referee: Paul Allaerts (Belgium)
13 November 2002
20:45

Milan (Italy)	1–2	(Spain) Deportivo La Coruña
Tomasson 34'	Report	Tristán 58'; Makaay 70'

San Siro, Milan
Attendance: 56,294
Referee: Mike Riley (England)

=== Group H ===
Pos	Team	Pld	W	D	L	GF	GA	GD	Pts	Qualification	BAR	LMO	BRU	GAL
1	(Spain) Barcelona	6	6	0	0	13	4	+9	18	Advance to second group stage	—	1–0	3–2	3–1
2	(Russia) Lokomotiv Moscow	6	2	1	3	5	7	−2	7	Advance to second group stage	1–3	—	2–0	0–2
3	(Belgium) Club Brugge	6	1	2	3	5	7	−2	5	Transfer to UEFA Cup	0–1	0–0	—	3–1
4	(Turkey) Galatasaray	6	1	1	4	5	10	−5	4		0–2	1–2	0–0	—

Source: RSSSF
18 September 2002
18:00 (20:00 UTC+4)

Lokomotiv Moscow (Russia)	0–2	(Turkey) Galatasaray
	Report	Sarr 72'; Erdem 81'

Lokomotiv Stadium, Moscow
Attendance: 18,000
Referee: Massimo Busacca (Switzerland)
18 September 2002
20:45

Barcelona (Spain)	3–2	(Belgium) Club Brugge
Luis Enrique 5'; Mendieta 40'; Saviola 44'	Report	Simons 22' (pen.); Englebert 85'

Camp Nou, Barcelona
Attendance: 83,540
Referee: Helmut Fleischer (Germany)

24 September 2002
20:45

Club Brugge (Belgium)	0–0	(Russia) Lokomotiv Moscow
	Report

Jan Breydel Stadium, Bruges
Attendance: 25,878
Referee: Paulo Costa (Portugal)
24 September 2002
20:45 (21:45 UTC+3)

Galatasaray (Turkey)	0–2	(Spain) Barcelona
	Report	Kluivert 27'; Luis Enrique 59'

Ali Sami Yen Stadium, Istanbul
Attendance: 20,327
Referee: Domenico Messina (Italy)

1 October 2002
18:00 (20:00 UTC+4)

Lokomotiv Moscow (Russia)	1–3	(Spain) Barcelona
Obiorah 56'	Report	Kluivert 29'; Saviola 32', 49'

Lokomotiv Stadium, Moscow
Attendance: 21,000
Referee: Mike McCurry (Scotland)
1 October 2002
20:45 (21:45 UTC+3)

Galatasaray (Turkey)	0–0	(Belgium) Club Brugge
	Report

Ali Sami Yen Stadium, Istanbul
Attendance: 19,163
Referee: Eric Poulat (France)

23 October 2002
20:45

Club Brugge (Belgium)	3–1	(Turkey) Galatasaray
Martens 45+1'; Verheyen 72'; Sæternes 90+1'	Report	Fabio Pinto 56'

Jan Breydel Stadium, Bruges
Attendance: 27,508
Referee: Massimo De Santis (Italy)
23 October 2002
20:45

Barcelona (Spain)	1–0	(Russia) Lokomotiv Moscow
F. de Boer 76'	Report

Camp Nou, Barcelona
Attendance: 62,426
Referee: Alain Hamer (Luxembourg)

29 October 2002
20:45 (21:45 UTC+2)

Galatasaray (Turkey)	1–2	(Russia) Lokomotiv Moscow
Şaş 73'	Report	Loskov 70'; Evseev 75'

Ali Sami Yen Stadium, Istanbul
Attendance: 19,789
Referee: Wolfgang Stark (Germany)
29 October 2002
20:45

Club Brugge (Belgium)	0–1	(Spain) Barcelona
	Report	Riquelme 64'

Jan Breydel Stadium, Bruges
Attendance: 27,344
Referee: Graham Poll (England)

13 November 2002
19:15 (21:15 UTC+3)

Lokomotiv Moscow (Russia)	2–0	(Belgium) Club Brugge
Júlio César 44'; Loskov 90+2'	Report

Lokomotiv Stadium, Moscow
Attendance: 17,000
Referee: Alain Sars (France)
13 November 2002
19:15

Barcelona (Spain)	3–1	(Turkey) Galatasaray
García 10'; Gerard 44'; Geovanni 56'	Report	Cihan 20'

Camp Nou, Barcelona
Attendance: 42,928
Referee: Dick van Egmond (Netherlands)
