= 1996–97 FC Bayern Munich season =

34th season of Bayern Munich in the Bundesliga

FC Bayern Munich
1996–97 season
- Manager: Giovanni Trapattoni
- Bundesliga: 1st (champions)
- UEFA Cup: First round
- DFB-Pokal: Quarter-final
- Top goalscorer: League: Jürgen Klinsmann (15); All: Jürgen Klinsmann (17)
Home colours	Away colours

The 1996–97 FC Bayern Munich season saw the club clinch its 13th Bundesliga title.

== Players ==
=== Squad, appearances and goals ===
No.	Pos	Nat	Player	Total		Bundesliga		UEFA Cup		DFB-Pokal	
No.	Pos	Nat	Player	Apps	Goals	Apps	Goals	Apps	Goals	Apps	Goals
1	GK	(Germany) GER	Oliver Kahn	38	0	32	0	2	0	4	0
12	GK	(Germany) GER	Sven Scheuer	2	0	2	0	0	0	0	0
2	DF	(Germany) GER	Markus Babbel	36	2	31	2	1	0	4	0
17	DF	(Germany) GER	Christian Ziege	33	9	27	7	2	1	4	1
10	DF	(Germany) GER	Lothar Matthäus	33	1	28	1	2	0	3	0
5	DF	(Germany) GER	Thomas Helmer	26	4	24	4	0	0	2	0
15	DF	(Ghana) GHA	Samuel Kuffour	25	0	22	0	1	0	2	0
3	DF	(Germany) GER	Markus Münch	14	0	11	0	1	0	2	0
4	DF	(Germany) GER	Oliver Kreuzer	13	0	9	0	2	0	2	0
6	MF	(Germany) GER	Christian Nerlinger	38	6	32	5	2	0	4	1
11	MF	(Germany) GER	Marcel Witeczek	32	3	28	3	2	0	2	0
13	MF	(Germany) GER	Mario Basler	31	8	27	8	1	0	3	0
16	MF	(Germany) GER	Dietmar Hamann	29	1	23	1	2	0	4	0
7	MF	(Germany) GER	Mehmet Scholl	28	6	23	5	2	0	3	1
8	MF	(Germany) GER	Thomas Strunz	25	1	19	1	2	0	4	0
23	MF	(Germany) GER	Frank Gerster	9	2	3	0	2	0	4	2
18	FW	(Germany) GER	Jürgen Klinsmann	39	17	33	15	2	0	4	2
21	FW	(Germany) GER	Alexander Zickler	38	8	33	7	1	0	4	1
20	FW	(Italy) ITA	Ruggiero Rizzitelli	30	7	25	7	2	0	3	0
19	FW	(Germany) GER	Carsten Jancker	24	1	22	1	1	0	1	0
14	FW	(Germany) GER	Carsten Lakies	1	0	1	0	0	0	0	0

=== Goals ===
Pos.	Player	BL	UC	Cup	Overall
1	(Germany) Jürgen Klinsmann	15	0	2	17
2	(Germany) Christian Ziege	7	1	1	9
3	(Germany) Alexander Zickler	7	0	1	8
3	(Germany) Mario Basler	8	0	1	8
5	(Italy) Ruggiero Rizzitelli	7	0	0	7

=== Bookings ===
N	Pos.	Nat.	Name	Yellow card	Second yellow card	Red card	Notes
1	GK	(Germany)	Oliver Kahn	2			
10	DF	(Germany)	Lothar Matthäus	8	1		
17	DF	(Germany)	Christian Ziege	8	1		
15	DF	(Ghana)	Samuel Kuffour	5			
2	DF	(Germany)	Markus Babbel	4			
4	DF	(Germany)	Oliver Kreuzer	3			
3	DF	(Germany)	Markus Münch	1			
5	DF	(Germany)	Thomas Helmer	1			
6	MF	(Germany)	Christian Nerlinger	13	1		
8	MF	(Germany)	Thomas Strunz	6			
13	MF	(Germany)	Mario Basler	5			
7	MF	(Germany)	Mehmet Scholl	2			
11	MF	(Germany)	Marcel Witeczek	1			
21	FW	(Germany)	Alexander Zickler	5		1	
18	FW	(Germany)	Jürgen Klinsmann	5			
20	FW	(Italy)	Ruggiero Rizzitelli	3			
19	FW	(Germany)	Carsten Jancker	2			

Source: Kicker
Only competitive matches
(yellow card) = Number of bookings; (second yellow card) = Number of sending offs after a second yellow card; (red card) = Number of sending offs by a direct red card.

=== Transfers ===
==== In ====
First Team

No.	Pos.	Nat.	Name	Age	EU	Moving from	Type	Transfer window	Ends	Transfer fee	Source
3	DF	(Germany)	Markus Münch	23	EU	Bayer Leverkusen	Transfer	Summer		€1,300,000	
13	MF	(Germany)	Mario Basler	27	EU	Werder Bremen	Transfer	Summer		€4,100,000	
14	FW	(Germany)	Carsten Lakies	25	EU	Darmstadt 98	Transfer	Summer		Undisclosed	worldfootball.net
19	FW	(Germany)	Carsten Jancker	21	EU	Rapid Wien (Austria)	Transfer	Summer		€770,000	
20	FW	(Italy)	Ruggiero Rizzitelli	28	EU	Torino (Italy)	Transfer	Summer		Free	
22	GK	(Germany)	Bernd Dreher	29	EU	KFC Uerdingen	Transfer	Summer		€250,000	
24	MF	(Germany)	Markus Oberleitner	22	EU	SpVgg Unterhaching	Transfer	Summer		Undisclosed	

Total spending: ▼€6.42m

==== Out ====
First Team

No.	Pos.	Nat.	Name	Age	EU	Moving to	Type	Transfer window	Transfer fee	Source
3	MF	(Germany)	Dieter Frey	23	EU	SC Freiburg	Transfer	Summer	Undisclosed	
9	FW	(France)	Jean-Pierre Papin	32	EU	Bordeaux (France)	Transfer	Summer	Undisclosed	Worldfootball.net
14	MF	(Switzerland)	Ciriaco Sforza	26	EU	Internazionale (Italy)	Transfer	Summer	€3,100,000	
19	FW	(Bulgaria)	Emil Kostadinov	28	EU	Fenerbahçe (Turkey)	Transfer	Summer	Undisclosed	
20	MF	(Austria)	Andreas Herzog	27	EU	Werder Bremen	Transfer	Summer	€1,750,000	
24	MF	(Germany)	Markus Oberleitner	23	EU	Fortuna Düsseldorf	Transfer	Winter	Undisclosed	

Total income: ▲€4.85m

== Management and coaching staff ==
Position	Staff
Manager	Giovanni Trapattoni
Assistant manager	Klaus Augenthaler
Goalkeeping coach	Sepp Maier
President	Franz Beckenbauer
Vice-president	Fritz Scherer
Vice-president	Karl-Heinz Rummenigge
Business manager	Uli Hoeneß
Leading physician	Hans-Wilhelm Müller-Wohlfahrt

== Results ==
=== Friendlies ===
==== FC Zürich Centenary Trophy ====
28 July Semifinals	Bayern Munich	1–2	Juventus FC	Zürich, Switzerland
	Witeczek 14'		Del Piero 30'; Amoruso 81'	Stadium: Letzigrund

29 July Third place	Bayern Munich	3–2	Grasshopper Club Zürich	Zürich, Switzerland
	Rizzitelli 16'; Zickler 21'; Papin 64'		Yakin 61' (pen.); Bieli 76'	Stadium: Letzigrund

==== Fuji-Cup ====
5 August Semifinals	Bayern Munich	4–0	Borussia Mönchengladbach	Ulm
	Rizzitelli 23', 30'; Klinsmann 63'; Zickler 88' (pen.)

8 August Final	FC Schalke 04	2–2 (4–3 p)	Bayern Munich	Koblenz
	Mulder 15'; Wilmots 65'		Hamann 70', 88'

==== Opel Master Cup ====
Bayern Munich was crowned champion due to goal difference. All matches lasted 45 minutes.

12 August 2	Bayern Munich	2–0	Paris Saint-Germain F.C.	Berlin
	Klinsmann 17', 28'			Stadium: Olympic Stadium (Berlin)

12 August 3	Bayern Munich	1–2	A.C. Milan	Berlin
	Klinsmann 14'		Davids 43'; Simone 45'	Stadium: Olympic Stadium (Berlin)

=== Bundesliga ===
==== League table ====
Pos	Team	Pld	W	D	L	GF	GA	GD	Pts	Qualification or relegation
1	Bayern Munich (C)	34	20	11	3	68	34	+34	71	Qualification to Champions League group stage (Note: Borussia Dortmund and Schalke 04 won their respective European competitions in this season, so they qualified as title holders. As a consequence, the original UEFA Cup places of Dortmund and Stuttgart, who qualified for the UEFA Cup Winners' Cup as domestic cup winners, were awarded to Karlsruhe and 1860 Munich; the Intertoto Cup berths of Karlsruhe and 1860 were handed to Köln and Hamburg, as Mönchengladbach did not apply for this competition.)
2	Bayer Leverkusen	34	21	6	7	69	41	+28	69	Qualification to Champions League second qualifying round
3	Borussia Dortmund	34	19	6	9	63	41	+22	63	Qualification to Champions League group stage
4	VfB Stuttgart	34	18	7	9	78	40	+38	61	Qualification to Cup Winners' Cup first round
5	VfL Bochum	34	14	11	9	54	51	+3	53	Qualification to UEFA Cup first round

Source: www.dfb.de
Rules for classification: 1) points; 2) goal difference; 3) number of goals scored.
(C) Champions

==== Matches ====
16 August 1996 1	St. Pauli	1–2	Bayern Munich	Hamburg
20:00 CEST	Driller 9'	Report	Rizzitelli 34'; Basler 37'	Stadium: Volksparkstadion; Attendance: 45,957; Referee: Georg Dardenne (Nettersheim)

21 August 1996 2	Bayern Munich	1–1	VfL Bochum	Munich
19:30 CEST	Rizzitelli 52'	Report	Peschel 73'	Stadium: Olympiastadion; Attendance: 60,000; Referee: Uwe Kemmling (Kleinburgwedel)

25 August 1996 3	MSV Duisburg	0–4	Bayern Munich	Duisburg
18:00 CEST		Report	Klinsmann 15'; Ziege 24', 90'; Witeczek 60'	Stadium: Wedaustadion; Attendance: 30,128 (sellout); Referee: Bernd Heynemann (Magdeburg)

28 August 1996 4	Bayern Munich	4–2	Bayer Leverkusen	Munich
19:30 CEST	Zickler 25'; Helmer 36'; Klinsmann 43'; Rizzitelli 48'	Report	Paulo Sérgio 24'; Feldhoff 53'	Stadium: Olympiastadion; Attendance: 48,000; Referee: Alfons Berg (Konz)

7 September 1996 5	Bayern Munich	1–0	Arminia Bielefeld	Munich
15:30 CEST	Ziege 58'	Report		Stadium: Olympiastadion; Attendance: 55000; Referee: Torsten Koop (Lüttenmark)

14 September 1996 6	Schalke	1–1	Bayern Munich	Gelsenkirchen
15:30 CEST	Max 36'	Report	Strunz 70'	Stadium: Parkstadion; Attendance: 70,500; Referee: Lutz Michael Fröhlich (Berlin)

21 September 1996 7	Bayern Munich	1–0	Karlsruher SC	Munich
15:30 CEST	Zickler 18'	Report		Stadium: Olympiastadion; Attendance: 63,000 (sellout); Referee: Hellmut Krug (Gelsenkirchen)

28 September 1996 8	Werder Bremen	3–0	Bayern Munich	Bremen
15:30 CEST	Herzog 23' (pen.), 47'; Labbadia 70'	Report		Stadium: Weserstadion; Attendance: 36,000 (sellout); Referee: Jürgen Jansen (Essen)

5 October 1996 9	Bayern Munich	2–1	Hamburg	Munich
15:30 CEST	Zickler 7'; Nerlinger 63'	Report	Spörl 53'	Stadium: Olympiastadion; Attendance: 63,000 (sellout); Referee: Herbert Fandel (Kyllburg)

12 October 1996 10	Köln	2–4	Bayern Munich	Cologne
15:30 CEST	Hauptmann 59'; Polster 77' (pen.)	Report	Klinsmann 35', 68'; Scholl 56' (pen.); Witeczek 90'	Stadium: Müngersdorferstadion; Attendance: 52,000 {sellout} Referee: Markus Merk (Kaiserslautern)

20 October 1996 11	Bayern Munich	0–0	Borussia Dortmund	Munich
15:30 CEST		Report		Stadium: Olympiastadion; Attendance: 63,000 (sellout); Referee: Lutz Michael Fröhlich (Berlin)

26 October 1996 12	Fortuna Düsseldorf	0–2	Bayern Munich	Düsseldorf
15:30 CEST		Report	Hamann 38'; Scholl 83'	Stadium: Rheinstadion; Attendance: 52,000 (sellout); Referee: Edgar Steinborn (Remagen)

1 November 1996 13	Bayern Munich	1–1	1860 Munich	Munich
18:00 CET	Markus Babbel 34'	Report	Nowak 55'	Stadium: Olympiastadion; Attendance: 69000 (sellout); Referee: Alfons Berg (Konz)

16 November 1996 14	Freiburg	0–0	Bayern Munich	Freiburg
15:30 CET		Report		Stadium: Dreisamstadion; Attendance: 22,500 (sellout); Referee: Bernd Heynemann (Magdeburg)

23 November 1996 15	Bayern Munich	2–1	Hansa Rostock	Munich
15:30 CET	Basler 31' (pen.), 43'	Report	Akpoborie 63'	Stadium: Olympiastadion; Attendance: 55,000; Referee: Hellmut Krug (Gelsenkirchen)

1 December 1996 16	VfB Stuttgart	1–1	Bayern Munich	Stuttgart
19:00 CET	Verlaat 80'	Report	Basler 7' (pen.)	Stadium: Gottlieb-Daimler-Stadion; Attendance: 53,000 (sellout); Referee: Hartmut Strampe (Handorf)

7 December 1996 17	Bayern Munich	1–0	Borussia Mönchengladbach	Munich
14:30 CET	Klinsmann 51'	Report		Stadium: Olympiastadion; Attendance: 63,000 (sellout); Referee: Jürgen Aust (Cologne)

15 February 1997 18	Bayern Munich	3–0	St. Pauli	Munich
15:30 CET	Klinsmann 28', 75'; Helmer 53'	Report		Stadium: Olympiastadion; Attendance: 33,000; Referee: Frank Fleske (Schönow)

22 February 1997 19	VfL Bochum	1–1	Bayern Munich	Bochum
15:30 CET	Kracht 55'	Report	Klinsmann 66'	Stadium: Ruhrstadion; Attendance: 36,344 (sellout); Referee: Bernd Heynemann (Magdeburg)

1 March 1997 20	Bayern Munich	5–2	MSV Duisburg	Munich
15:30 CET	Basler 3'; Klinsmann 26'; Ziege 48', 59'; Reiter 53' (o.g.)	Report	Nijhuis 72', 83'	Stadium: Olympiastadion; Attendance: 39,000; Referee: Uwe Kemmling (Kleinburgwedel)

9 March 1997 21	Bayer Leverkusen	5–2	Bayern Munich	Leverkusen
19:00 CET	Paulo Sérgio 5'; Rydlewicz 37'; Feldhoff 42', 80', 84'	Report	Nerlinger 64'; Basler 71'	Stadium: Ulrich-Haberland-Stadion; Attendance: 22,500 (sellout); Referee: Edgar Steinborn (Remagen)

12 March 1997 23	Arminia Bielefeld	2–0	Bayern Munich	Bielefeld
20:00 CET	Kuntz 11', 29'	Report		Stadium: Bielefelder Alm; Attendance: 22,512 (sellout); Referee: Georg Dardenne (Nettersheim)

15 March 1997 23	Bayern Munich	3–0	Schalke	Munich
15:30 CET	Helmer 13'; Nerlinger 87'; Klinsmann 90'	Report		Stadium: Olympiastadion; Attendance: 63,000 (sellout); Referee: Markus Merk (Kaiserslautern)

23 March 1997 24	Karlsruher SC	0–2	Bayern Munich	Karlsruhe
19:00 CET		Report	Zickler 30', 90'	Stadium: Wildparkstadion; Attendance: 33,000 (sellout); Referee: Hellmut Krug (Gelsenkirchen)

29 March 1997 25	Bayern Munich	1–0	Werder Bremen	Munich
15:30 CET	Zickler 1'	Report		Stadium: Olympiastadion; Attendance: 63,00 (sellout); Referee: Jürgen Jansen (Essen)

5 April 1997 26	Hamburg	0–3	Bayern Munich	Hamburg
15:30 CEST		Report	Klinsmann 16'; Basler 43'; Helmer 64'	Stadium: Volksparkstadion; Attendance: 57,950; Referee: Bernd Heynemann (Magdeburg)

12 April 1997 27	Bayern Munich	3–2	Köln	Munich
15:30 CEST	Markus Babbel 43'; Klinsmann 51'; Rizzitelli 59'	Report	Scherr 79'; Zdebel 88'	Stadium: Olympiastadion; Attendance: 63,000 (sellout); Referee: Hartmut Strampe (Handorf)

19 April 1997 28	Borussia Dortmund	1–1	Bayern Munich	Dortmund
15:30 CEST	Riedle 2'	Report	Rizzitelli 3'	Stadium: Westfalenstadion; Attendance: 55,000; Referee: Alfons Berg (Konz)

26 April 1997 29	Bayern Munich	5–0	Fortuna Düsseldorf	Munich
15:30 CEST	Nerlinger 6'; Basler 35'; Rizzitelli 38'; Zickler 45'; Matthäus 52'	Report		Stadium: Olympiastadion; Attendance: 61,000; Referee: Bernhard Zerr (Ottersweiser)

4 May 1997 30	1860 Munich	3–3	Bayern Munich	Munich
18:00 CEST	Heldt 15', 18'; Böhme 82'	Report	Klinsmann 45'; Scholl 57'; Jancker 88'	Stadium: Olympiastadion; Attendance: 69000 (sellout); Referee: Hans-Jurgen Weber (Essen)

10 May 1997 31	Bayern Munich	0–0	Freiburg	Munich
15:30 CEST		Report		Stadium: Olympiastadion; Attendance: 63,000 (sellout); Referee: Frank Fleske (Schönow)

16 May 1997 32	Hansa Rostock	0–3	Bayern Munich	Rostock
20:00 CEST		Report	Ziege 33'; Klinsmann 56'; Scholl 62'	Stadium: Ostseestadion; Attendance: 24,200 (sellout); Referee: Hellmut Krug (Gelsenkirchen)

24 May 1997 33	Bayern Munich	4–2	VfB Stuttgart	Munich
15:30 CEST	Ziege 33'; Scholl 45'; Rizzitelli 65'; Witeczek 78'	Report	Schwarz 17'; Bobic 51'	Stadium: Olympiastadion; Attendance: 63,000 (sellout); Referee: Markus Merk (Kaiserslautern)

31 May 1997 34	Borussia Mönchengladbach	2–2	Bayern Munich	Mönchengladbach
15:30 CEST	Paßlack 44'; Pflipsen 47'	Report	Klinsmann 42'; Nerlinger 86'	Stadium: Bökelbergstadion; Attendance: 34,500 (sellout); Referee: Alfons Berg (Konz)

==== Results by round ====
Round	1	2	3	4	5	6	7	8	9	10	11	12	13	14	15	16	17	18	19	20	21	22	23	24	25	26	27	28	29	30	31	32	33	34
Ground	A	H	A	H	H	A	H	A	H	A	H	A	H	A	H	A	H	H	A	H	A	A	H	A	H	A	H	A	H	A	H	A	H	A
Result	W	D	W	W	W	D	W	L	W	W	D	W	D	D	W	D	W	W	D	W	L	L	W	W	W	W	W	D	W	D	D	W	W	D
Position	5	3	2	1	1	2	1	3	3	2	2	2	1	3	1	2	1	1	1	1	2	2	2	1	1	1	1	1	1	1	1	1	1	1

Source: Kicker
A = Away; H = Home; W = Win; D = Draw; L = Loss

=== DFB Pokal ===
10 August 1996 1st Round	Tennis Borussia Berlin	0–3	Bayern Munich	Berlin
15:30 CEST		Report	Nerlinger 49'; Scholl 88'; Strunz 90'	Stadium: Olympic Stadium; Attendance: 39,542; Referee: Hellmut Krug (Gelsenkirchen)

2 October 1996 2nd Round	Borussia Mönchengladbach	1–2	Bayern Munich	Mönchengladbach
20:30 CEST	Neun 9'	Report	Strunz 28'; Zickler 85'	Stadium: Bökelbergstadion; Attendance: 34,500 (sellout); Referee: Hartmut Strampe (Handorf)

12 November 1996 Round of 16	Bayern Munich	3–0	1. FSV Mainz 05	Munich
20:30 CET	Klinsmann 45', 89'; Ziege 65'	Report		Stadium: Olympiastadion; Attendance: 32,000; Referee: Georg Dardenne (Nettersheim)

19 February 1997 QF	Karlsruher SC	1–0	Bayern Munich	Karlsruhe
20:30 CET	Fink 21'	Report		Stadium: Wildparkstadion; Attendance: 33,0000; Referee: Hans-Jürgen Weber (Essen)

=== UEFA Cup ===
10 September 1996

Valencia (Spain)	3 – 0	(Germany) Bayern Munich
Engonga 19' (pen.); López 26'; Moya 47'

Valencia
24 September 1996

Bayern Munich (Germany)	1 – 0	(Spain) Valencia
Ziege 3'

Munich

Valencia won 3–1 on aggregate.

== Sources ==
- Soccerbase.com
- kicker
