= 1994–95 FC Bayern Munich season =

95th season in existence of Bayern Munich

FC Bayern Munich
1994–95 season
- Manager: Giovanni Trapattoni
- Stadium: Olympiastadion
- Bundesliga: 6th
- Champions League: Semi-finals
- DFB-Pokal: First round
- DFB-Supercup: Runners-up
- Top goalscorer: League: Christian Ziege (12 goals); All: Mehmet Scholl; Christian Ziege (12 each)
Home colours	Away colours

The 1994–95 FC Bayern Munich season was the 95th season in the club's history and 30th season since promotion from Regionalliga Süd in 1965. The first competitive match was the DFB-Supercup on 7 August which Bayern lost to SV Werder Bremen after 120 minutes of play. The Bundesliga campaign ended with a sixth-place finish. The club lost the first game of the DFB-Pokal. This loss caused the third exit after one match since 1990–91. Bayern made it to the semifinals of the Champions League before being eliminated by Ajax. Giovanni Trapattoni managed the club for one season before returning in 1996–97.

== Results ==
=== Friendlies ===
==== Fuji-Cup ====
31 July Semifinals	Bayern Munich	1–0	VfB Stuttgart	Augsburg
	Papin 27'

4 August Final	Bayern Munich	0–0 (5–4 p)	Eintracht Frankfurt	Koblenz

==== Stuttgart Tournament ====
10 August Semifinals	Bayern Munich	3–0	FC Barcelona	Stuttgart

11 August Final	VfB Stuttgart	2–1	Bayern Munich	Stuttgart

==== Trofeo Luigi Berlusconi ====
17 August Final	A.C. Milan	1–0	Bayern Munich	Milan
	Gullit 67'			Stadium: San Siro; Attendance: 17.626; Referee: Collina

=== Bundesliga ===
==== League results ====
Match	Date	Ground	Opponent	Score^{1}	Pos.	Pts.	GD	Report
1	20 August	H	VfL Bochum	3 – 1	2	2	2	Report / Report link; Kick off / 15:30 CEST; Attendance / 54,000; Referee / Edgar Steinborn; Bayern Munich / VfL Bochum; Scholl 67'; Helmer 72'; Nerlinger 73'; Sutter (yellow card); Papin (yellow card) / Aden 87'; Stöver (yellow card)
2	23 August	A	SC Freiburg	1 – 5	13	2	-2	Report / Report link; Kick off / 19:30 CEST; Attendance / 18,000; Referee / Hans-Jürgen Weber; SC Freiburg / Bayern Munich; Spanring 11'; Kohl 17' (yellow card); Cardoso 18', 58' (pen.); Heinrich 68' / Ziege 32' (yellow card); Papin (yellow card) 76' (red card); Schupp (yellow card); Frey (yellow card); Helmer (yellow card); Kreuzer (yellow card)
3	27 August	H	Borussia Mönchengladbach	3 – 0	6	4	1	Report / Report link; Kick off / 15:30 CEST; Attendance / 57,000; Referee / Hartmut Strampe; Bayern Munich / Borussia Mönchengladbach; Kreuzer 22'; Nerlinger 33'; Matthäus 84' (yellow card); Scholl (yellow card) / Klinkert (yellow card); Effenberg (yellow card)
4	2 September	A	MSV Duisburg	3 – 0	3	6	4	Report / Report link; Kick off / 19:30 CEST; Attendance / 30,128; Referee / Hans-Jürgen Kasper; MSV Duisburg / Bayern Munich; / Nerlinger 8'; Witeczek 26'; Helmer 42'; Kahn (yellow card); Matthäus (yellow card)
5	17 September	H	Hamburger SV	1 – 1	5	7	4	Report / Report link; Kick off / 15:30 CEST; Attendance / 60,000; Referee / Günther Habermann; Bayern Munich / Hamburger SV; Matthäus 84' (pen.) / Breitenreiter 15'; Stein (red card) 58'; Schnoor (yellow card); Bach (yellow card); Bäron (yellow card); Spörl (yellow card); Fischer (yellow card)
6	21 September	A	1860 Munich	3 – 1	4	9	6	Report / Report link; Kick off / 20:15 CEST; Attendance / 64,000; Referee / Hellmut Krug; 1860 Munich / Bayern Munich; Winkler (red card) 70'; Pacult 78' (pen.); Schwabl (red card) 83'; Trares (yellow card); Schmidt (yellow card); Störzenhofecker (yellow card); Strogies (yellow card); Yanyali (yellow card) / Schupp 29'; Nerlinger (yellow card) 35' (red card); Ziege 55' (yellow card); Zickler 87'; Frey (yellow card)
7	1 October	H	1. FC Köln	2 – 2	4	10	6	Report / Report link; Kick off / 15:30 CET; Attendance / 63,000; Referee / Wolf-Günter Wiesel; Bayern Munich / 1. FC Köln; Ziege 67' (yellow card); Zickler 83'; Sternkopf (yellow card); Scholl (yellow card) / Labbadia 43'; Polster 43'; Janßen (yellow card); Rolff (yellow card)
8	5 October	A	1. FC Kaiserslautern	1 – 1	4	11	6	Report / Report link; Kick off / 20:15 CET; Attendance / 38,000; Referee / Bernd Heynemann; 1. FC Kaiserslautern / Bayern Munich; Kuka 9'; Brehme (yellow card) / Zickler 77'; Schupp (yellow card); Ziege (yellow card)
9	15 October	H	Eintracht Frankfurt	3 – 3	4	12	6	Report / Report link; Kick off / 15:30 CET; Attendance / 63,000; Referee / Hans-Jürgen Weber; Bayern Munich / Eintracht Frankfurt; Babbel 37'; Ziege 70'; Sutter 83'; Matthäus (yellow card) / Dickhaut 5' (yellow card); Doll 54'; Komljenović 86'; Weber (yellow card); Okocha (yellow card)
10	22 October	A	Borussia Dortmund	0 – 1	5	12	5	Report / Report link; Kick off / 15:30 CET; Attendance / 42,800; Referee / Edgar Steinborn; Borussia Dortmund / Bayern Munich; Riedle 79'; Reuter (yellow card); Zorc (yellow card) / Babbel (yellow card)
11	29 October	H	VfB Stuttgart	2 – 2	8	13	5	Report / Report link; Kick off / 15:30 CET; Attendance / 63,000; Referee / Georg Dardenne; Bayern Munich / VfB Stuttgart; Zickler 64'; Matthäus 82' (yellow card); Frey (yellow card); Ziege (yellow card); Nerlinger (yellow card) / Poschner 16'; Kienle 57'; Berthold (yellow card); Kruse (yellow card); Strunz (yellow card)
12	5 November	A	FC Bayer 05 Uerdingen	1 – 1	9	14	5	Report / Report link; Kick off / 15:30 CET; Attendance / 34,500; Referee / Hartmut Strampe; FC Bayer 05 Uerdingen / Bayern Munich; Paßlack 89' (yellow card); Laeßig (yellow card) / Matthäus 87' (pen.); Frey (yellow card); Kreuzer (yellow card)
13	12 November	H	Schalke 04	2 – 0	7	16	7	Report / Report link; Kick off / 15:30 CET; Attendance / 50,000; Referee / Bernhard Zerr; Bayern Munich / Schalke 04; Papin 62'; Jorginho 82' (yellow card); Hamann (yellow card) / Thon (red card) 63'; Eigenrauch (yellow card); Herzog (yellow card); Mulder (yellow card)
14	19 November	A	Karlsruher SC	2 – 2	8	17	7	Report / Report link; Kick off / 15:30 CET; Attendance / 33,000; Referee / Hellmut Krug; Karlsruher SC / Bayern Munich; Schmitt 50' (yellow card); Carl 90' (yellow card); Bilić (yellow card); Nowotny (yellow card) / Frey 49' (yellow card); Schupp 53' (yellow card) 90' (red card); Kuffour (yellow card) 89' (red card); Sternkopf (yellow card)
15	26 November	H	Bayer Leverkusen	2 – 1	5	19	8	Report / Report link; Kick off / 15:30 CET; Attendance / 41,000; Referee / Lutz Michael Fröhlich; Bayern Munich / Bayer Leverkusen; Nerlinger 43' (yellow card); Matthäus 74' (pen.); Scheuer (yellow card) / Kirsten 31'; Schuster (yellow card) 81' (red card); Völler (yellow card); Hapal (yellow card)
16	3 December	H	Dynamo Dresden	2 – 1	6	21	9	Report / Report link; Kick off / 15:30 CET; Attendance / 33,000; Referee / Rainer Werthmann; Bayern Munich / Dynamo Dresden; Ziege 56', 59'; Dietmar Hamann (yellow card) / Kern (yellow card) 80' (red card); Lesiak 86'; Pilz (yellow card); Kranz (yellow card)
17	10 December	A	Werder Bremen	0 – 0	5	22	9	Report / Report link; Kick off / 15:30 CET; Attendance / 40,633; Referee / Alfons Berg; Werder Bremen / Bayern Munich; Hobsch (yellow card); Basler (yellow card) / Kreuzer (yellow card); Schupp (yellow card)
18	18 December	A	VfL Bochum	2 – 1	4	24	10	Report / Report link; Kick off / 15:30 CET; Attendance / 38,000; Referee / Edgar Steinborn; VfL Bochum / Bayern Munich; Herrmann 72' (yellow card); Wosz (yellow card); Frontzeck (yellow card) / Kostadinov 37'; Helmer 49'; Frey (yellow card)
19	25 February	H	SC Freiburg	2 – 2	6	25	10	Report / Report link; Kick off / 15:30 CET; Attendance / 50,000; Referee / Hans-Jürgen Weber; Bayern Munich / SC Freiburg; Scholl 44'; Helmer 69'; Sternkopf (yellow card); Kreuzer (yellow card); Frey (yellow card); Zickler (yellow card) / Sundermann 4'; Todt 29'; Heinrich (yellow card)
20	4 March	A	Borussia Mönchengladbach	2 – 2	6	26	10	Report / Report link; Kick off / 15:30 CET; Attendance / 34,500; Referee / Lutz Michael Fröhlich; Borussia Mönchengladbach / Bayern Munich; Dahlin 40'; Herrlich 70'; Nielsen (yellow card) / Kostadinov 42'; Ziege 80'; Scholl (yellow card); Kreuzer (yellow card)
21	10 March	H	MSV Duisburg	1 – 1	6	27	10	Report / Report link; Kick off / 20:00 CET; Attendance / 30,000; Referee / Frank Fleske; Bayern Munich / MSV Duisburg; Scholl 29'; Kostadinov (yellow card) / Marin 66'; Nijhuis (yellow card); Westerbeek (yellow card)
22	18 March	A	Hamburger SV	1 – 1	6	28	10	Report / Report link; Kick off / 15:30 CET; Attendance / 60,200; Referee / Jürgen Jansen; Hamburger SV / Bayern Munich; Kovačević (red card) 80'; Albertz 86'; Ordenewitz (yellow card) / Scholl 67' (pen.); Nerlinger (yellow card); Helmer (yellow card)
23	25 March	H	1860 Munich	1 – 0	6	30	11	Report / Report link; Kick off / 15:30 CET; Attendance / 63,000; Referee / Georg Dardenne; Bayern Munich / 1860 Munich; Scholl 11'; Babbel (yellow card); Kostadinov (yellow card); Ziege (yellow card) / Stević (yellow card)
24	1 April	A	1. FC Köln	1 – 3	6	30	9	Report / Report link; Kick off / 15:30 CEST; Attendance / 55,000; Referee / Hans-Jürgen Kasper; 1. FC Köln / Bayern Munich; Thiam 43'; Polster 62', 75'; Andersen (yellow card); Rudy (yellow card) / Babbel 44'
25	8 April	H	1. FC Kaiserslautern	1 – 1	6	31	9	Report / Report link; Kick off / 15:30 CET; Attendance / 63,000; Referee / Jürgen Aust; Bayern Munich / 1. FC Kaiserslautern; Scholl 45' (yellow card); Pflügler (yellow card) / Kuntz 42'; Ritter (yellow card)
26	15 April	A	Eintracht Frankfurt	0 – 2	6	31	7	Report / Report link; Kick off / 15:30 CEST; Attendance / 58,000; Referee / Eugen Strigel; Eintracht Frankfurt / Bayern Munich; Okocha 14'; Reis 43'; Roth (yellow card); Aničić (yellow card) / Schupp 6' (yellow card); Witeczek 45'; Ziege 48', 83'; Frey 80'^{1}
27	22 April	H	Borussia Dortmund	2 – 1	6	33	8	Report / Report link; Kick off / 15:30 CEST; Attendance / 63,000; Referee / Hartmut Strampe; Bayern Munich / Borussia Dortmund; Zickler 51'; Ziege 69' / Ricken 82'; Kurz (yellow card); Freund (yellow card)
28	29 April	A	VfB Stuttgart	2 – 0	6	35	10	Report / Report link; Kick off / 15:30 CEST; Attendance / 53,700; Referee / Edgar Steinborn; VfB Stuttgart / Bayern Munich; Foda (yellow card) / Scholl 42' (pen.); Zickler 74'; Kreuzer (yellow card)
29	6 May	H	FC Bayer 05 Uerdingen	2 – 1	6	37	11	Report / Report link; Kick off / 15:30 CEST; Attendance / 42,000; Referee / Dr. Volkmar Fischer; Bayern Munich / FC Bayer 05 Uerdingen; Nerlinger 13'; Scholl 51'; Babbel (yellow card); Schupp (yellow card) / Steffen 32' (pen.); Rahner (yellow card)
30	14 May	A	Schalke 04	3 – 0	5	39	14	Report / Report link; Kick off / 18:00 CEST; Attendance / 68,000; Referee / Hans-Jürgen Kasper; Schalke 04 / Bayern Munich; Němec (yellow card) / Ziege 16'; Scholl 23'; Zickler 90'; Frey (yellow card)
31	20 May	H	Karlsruher SC	0 – 1	6	39	13	Report / Report link; Kick off / 15:30 CEST; Attendance / 63,000; Referee / Jürgen Jansen; Bayern Munich / Karlsruher SC; Ziege (yellow card) / Bender 19'; Bilić (yellow card); Bonan (yellow card)
32	27 May	A	Bayer Leverkusen	0 – 2	6	39	11	Report / Report link; Kick off / 15:30 CEST; Attendance / 27,600; Referee / Bernd Heynemann; Bayer Leverkusen / Bayern Munich; Kirsten 45'; Paulo Sérgio 90'; Happe (yellow card); Schuster (yellow card) / Sternkopf (yellow card); Ziege (yellow card); Nerlinger (yellow card)
33	10 June	A	Dynamo Dresden	1 – 0	6	41	12	Report / Report link; Kick off / 15:30 CEST; Attendance / 29,253; Referee / Frank Kiefer; Dynamo Dresden / Bayern Munich; / Witeczek 88'; Ziege (yellow card); Kreuzer (yellow card)
34	17 June	H	Werder Bremen	3 – 1	6	43	14	Report / Report link; Kick off / 15:30 CEST; Attendance / 63,000; Referee / Jürgen Aust; Bayern Munich / Werder Bremen; Ziege 13' (yellow card); Zickler 41', 78'; Nerlinger (yellow card) / Basler 37' (pen.); Eilts (yellow card); Neubarth (yellow card)

^{1}Bayern Munich goals come first.
Ground's country's flag and opponent's country's flag shown when from a different country of Bayern Munich.
Pos. = Position in league, Pts. = Points, GD = Goal difference, Ground: H = Home, A = Away, N = Neutral, HR = Home replacement, AR = Away replacement.

Notes

- Note 1: Bayern Munich initially won the game 5–2, but since Bayern fielded four amateurs instead of the allowed three, the match was awarded to Eintracht Frankfurt as a 2–0 victory. The goals and bookings shown reflect the original match, but the score, points, position, and goal difference reflect the loss.

==== League standings ====
Pos	Team	Pld	W	D	L	GF	GA	GD	Pts	Qualification or relegation
4	1. FC Kaiserslautern	34	17	12	5	58	41	+17	46	Qualification to UEFA Cup first round
5	Borussia Mönchengladbach	34	17	9	8	66	41	+25	43	Qualification to Cup Winners' Cup first round
6	Bayern Munich	34	15	13	6	55	41	+14	43	Qualification to UEFA Cup first round (Note: As Mönchengladbach qualified for the Cup Winners' Cup, their UEFA Cup place was transferred to Bayern Munich.)
7	Bayer Leverkusen	34	13	10	11	62	51	+11	36	Qualification to Intertoto Cup group stage
8	Karlsruher SC	34	11	14	9	51	47	+4	36	Qualification to Intertoto Cup group stage

Source: www.dfb.de
Rules for classification: 1) points; 2) goal difference; 3) number of goals scored.

=== DFB Pokal ===
14 August 1st Round	TSV Vestenbergsgreuth	1–0	Bayern Munich	Nuremberg
20:15 CEST	Stein 43'	Report	Sternkopf (yellow card); Nerlinger (yellow card); Papin (yellow card)	Stadium: Frankenstadion; Attendance: 24,200; Referee: Markus Merk

=== DFB-Supercup ===
7 August Final	Bayern Munich	1–3 (a.e.t.)	SV Werder Bremen	Munich
	Kreuzer (red card) 21'; Nerlinger 57'		Beschastnykh 2'; Schulz 104'; Rufer 116'	Stadium: Olympiastadion; Attendance: 22,000; Referee: Bernd Heynemann

=== Champions League ===
==== Group stage ====
Pos	Team	Pld	W	D	L	GF	GA	GD	Pts	Qualification	PAR	BAY	SPM	DKV
1	(France) Paris Saint-Germain	6	6	0	0	12	3	+9	12	Advance to knockout stage	—	2–0	4–1	1–0
2	(Germany) Bayern Munich	6	2	2	2	8	7	+1	6	Advance to knockout stage	0–1	—	2–2	1–0
3	(Russia) Spartak Moscow	6	1	2	3	8	12	−4	4		1–2	1–1	—	1–0
4	(Ukraine) Dynamo Kyiv	6	1	0	5	5	11	−6	2		1–2	1–4	3–2	—

Source: UEFA

14 September 1	Paris Saint-Germain (France)	2–0	(Germany) Bayern Munich	Paris, France
20:30 CEST	Weah 39'; Roche (yellow card) 42'; Valdo (yellow card) 52'; Bravo 80'		Kreuzer (yellow card) 4'; Helmer (yellow card) 32'; Matthäus (yellow card) 63'; Mazinho (yellow card) 63'	Stadium: Parc des Princes; Attendance: 36,924; Referee: David Elleray (England)

28 September 2	Bayern Munich (Germany)	1–0	(Ukraine) Dynamo Kyiv	Munich, Germany
20:30 CET	Scholl 9'; Nerlinger (yellow card) 15'; Schupp (yellow card) 61'; Papin (yellow card) 61'		Mizin (yellow card) 32' (red card)	Stadium: Olympiastadion; Attendance: 26,000; Referee: Ion Crăciunescu (Romania)

19 October 3	Spartak Moscow (Russia)	1–1	(Germany) Bayern Munich	Moscow, Russia
19:15 MSK	Pisarev 77'; Ananko (yellow card) 88'		Frey (yellow card) 56'; Babbel 90'	Stadium: Luzhniki Stadium; Attendance: 10,000; Referee: Guy Goethals (Belgium)

2 November 4	Bayern Munich (Germany)	2–2	(Russia) Spartak Moscow	Munich, Germany
20:30 CET	Nerlinger 28'; Kuffour 36'; Jorginho (yellow card) 70'		Tikhonov 4'; Rakhimov (yellow card) 30'; Alenichev 32'; Ananko (yellow card) 83'	Stadium: Olympiastadion; Attendance: 31,000; Referee: Mario van der Ende (Netherlands)

23 November 5	Bayern Munich (Germany)	0–1	(France) Paris Saint-Germain	Munich, Germany
20:30 CET	Schupp (yellow card) 56'; Hamann (yellow card) 88'		Séchet (yellow card) 55'; Weah 80'	Stadium: Olympiastadion; Attendance: 46,000; Referee: Manuel Díaz Vega (Spain)

7 December 6	Dynamo Kyiv (Ukraine)	1–4	(Germany) Bayern Munich	Kyiv, Ukraine
20:30 EET	Shevchenko 38'		Sutter (yellow card) 29'; Hamann (yellow card) 40'; Nerlinger 45'; Papin (yellow card) 51' (goal) 57', 82'; Scholl 86'	Stadium: Republican Stadium; Attendance: 25,000; Referee: Václav Krondl (Czech Republic)

==== Knockout stage ====
===== Quarterfinals =====
1 March 1st Leg	Bayern Munich (Germany)	0–0	(Sweden) IFK Göteborg	Munich, Germany
19:00 CET			Kåmark (yellow card) 33'; Martinsson (yellow card) 51'; Eriksson (yellow card) 66'	Stadium: Olympiastadion; Attendance: 46,000; Referee: Sergei Khusainov (Russia)

15 March 2nd Leg	IFK Göteborg (Sweden)	2–2 (2–2a agg.)	(Germany) Bayern Munich	Gothenburg, Sweden
18:45 CET	Lindqvist (yellow card) 42'; Lilienberg 79'; Martinsson 89'		Scheuer (red card) 20'; Zickler (yellow card) 33' (goal) 63'; Nerlinger 72'; Frey (yellow card) 78'; Kuffour (yellow card) 87'	Stadium: Nya Ullevi; Attendance: 36,400; Referee: Leslie Mottram (Scotland)

===== Semifinals =====
5 April 1st Leg	Bayern Munich (Germany)	0–0	(Netherlands) Ajax	Munich, Germany
20:30 CEST			F. de Boer (yellow card) 52'	Stadium: Olympiastadion; Attendance: 60,000; Referee: Ahmet Çakar (Turkey)

19 April 2nd Leg	Ajax (Netherlands)	5–2 (5–2 agg.)	(Germany) Bayern Munich	Amsterdam, Netherlands
20:30 CEST	Litmanen 11', 47'; Finidi 41'; R. de Boer 44'; Blind (yellow card) 74'; Overmars 88'		Ziege (yellow card) 23'; Kuffour (yellow card) 34'; Witeczek 36'; Scholl 75' (pen.)	Stadium: Olympisch Stadion; Attendance: 42,000; Referee: Sándor Puhl (Hungary)

== Team statistics ==
Competition	First match	Last match	Starting round	Final position	Record							
Competition	First match	Last match	Starting round	Final position	G	W	D	L	GF	GA	GD	Win %
Bundesliga	20 August 1994	17 June 1995	Matchday 1	6th	34	15	13	6	55	41	+14	44.12
DFB-Pokal	14 August 1994	14 August 1994	First round	First round	1	0	0	1	0	1	−1	0.00
DFB-Supercup	7 August 1994		Final	Runner-up	1	0	0	1	1	3	−2	0.00
Champions League	14 September 1994	19 April 1995	Group stage	Semifinals	10	2	5	3	12	14	−2	20.00
Total					46	17	18	11	68	59	+9	36.96

== Players ==
=== Squad, appearances and goals ===
No.	Pos	Nat	Player	Total		Bundesliga		DFB-Pokal		DFB-Supercup		Champions League	
No.	Pos	Nat	Player	Apps	Goals	Apps	Goals	Apps	Goals	Apps	Goals	Apps	Goals
1	GK	(Germany) GER	Oliver Kahn	30	0	23+0	0	1+0	0	1+0	0	5+0	0
12	GK	(Germany) GER	Sven Scheuer	14	0	9+1	0	0+0	0	0+0	0	4+0	0
22	GK	(Germany) GER	Uwe Gospodarek	4	0	2+0	0	0+0	0	0+0	0	1+1	0
14	DF	(Germany) GER	Markus Babbel	35	3	26+0	2	1+0	0	0+0	0	8+0	1
5	DF	(Germany) GER	Thomas Helmer (vice-captain)	34	4	24+0	4	1+0	0	1+0	0	8+0	0
4	DF	(Germany) GER	Oliver Kreuzer	33	1	25+0	1	0+0	0	1+0	0	5+2	0
15	DF	(Ghana) GHA	Samuel Kuffour	13	1	9+0	0	0+0	0	0+0	0	3+1	1
23	DF	(Germany) GER	Marco Grimm	2	0	0+1	0	0+0	0	0+0	0	0+1	0
19	DF	(Germany) GER	Hans Pflügler	1	0	1+0	0	0+0	0	0+0	0	0+0	0
7	MF	(Germany) GER	Mehmet Scholl	43	12	30+1	9	1+0	0	1+0	0	9+1	3
6	MF	(Germany) GER	Christian Nerlinger	43	9	31+0	5	1+0	0	1+0	1	10+0	3
17	MF	(Germany) GER	Christian Ziege	38	12	28+1	12	0+0	0	0+0	0	9+0	0
16	MF	(Germany) GER	Dietmar Hamann	38	0	6+24	0	1+0	0	0+1	0	2+4	0
8	MF	(Germany) GER	Markus Schupp	37	3	23+4	3	0+1	0	1+0	0	7+1	0
3	MF	(Germany) GER	Dieter Frey	35	2	23+4	2	0+0	0	1+0	0	5+2	0
18	MF	(Switzerland) SUI	Alain Sutter	30	1	19+3	1	0+0	0	1+0	0	6+1	0
2	MF	(Germany) GER	Michael Sternkopf	30	0	17+9	0	1+0	0	1+0	0	0+2	0
11	MF	(Germany) GER	Marcel Witeczek	29	4	14+8	3	1+0	0	0+0	0	6+0	1
10	MF	(Germany) GER	Lothar Matthäus (captain)	24	5	16+0	5	1+0	0	1+0	0	6+0	0
21	FW	(Germany) GER	Alexander Zickler	36	10	21+8	9	0+0	0	0+0	0	6+1	1
9	FW	(France) FRA	Jean-Pierre Papin	12	3	6+1	1	1+0	0	1+0	0	2+1	2
19	FW	(Bulgaria) BUL	Emil Kostadinov	11	2	8+1	2	0+0	0	0+0	0	2+0	0
Players sold or loaned out after the start of the season:
2	DF	(Brazil) BRA	Jorginho	17	1	10+0	1	1+0	0	0+0	0	6+0	0
20	FW	(Brazil) BRA	Mazinho	4	0	2+1	0	0+0	0	0+0	0	0+1	0
11	FW	(Colombia) COL	Adolfo Valencia	3	0	1+0	0	0+1	0	0+1	0	0+0	0

=== Minutes played ===
No.	Player	Total	Bundesliga	DFB-Pokal	DFB-Supercup	Champions League
6	Christian Nerlinger	3,731	2,621	90	120	900
7	Mehmet Scholl	3,499	2,571	90	120	718
	Christian Ziege	3,360	2,550	0	0	810
2	Markus Babbel	3,150	2,340	90	0	720
5	Thomas Helmer	2,927	2,047	90	120	670
4	Oliver Kreuzer	2,788	2,250	0	21	517
3	Dieter Frey	2,756	2,151	0	120	485
	Markus Schupp	2,675	1933	44	120	578
1	Oliver Kahn	2,673	2,013	90	120	450
21	Alexander Zickler	2,525	1,990	0	0	535
10	Lothar Matthäus	2,146	1,413	90	120	523
	Alain Sutter	1,947	1,391	0	36	520
	Michael Sternkopf	1,908	1,644	90	120	54
	Marcel Witeczek	1,814	1,283	63	0	468
16	Dietmar Hamann	1,509	1,104	46	60	299
	Jorginho	1,414	784	90	0	540
12	Sven Scheuer	1,157	867	0	0	290
	Samuel Kuffour	998	720	0	0	278
9	Jean-Pierre Papin	837	484	90	60	203
	Emil Kostadinov	714	603	0	0	111
	Uwe Gospodarek	339	180	0	0	159
	Mazinho	180	147	0	0	33
	Adolfo Valencia	170	59	27	84	0
	Hans Pflügler	90	90	0	0	0
	Marco Grimm	67	65	0	0	2

=== Bookings ===
No.	Player	Bundesliga			DFB-Pokal			DFB-SC			Champions League			Total		
No.	Player	Yellow card	(yellow card) (red card)	Red card	Yellow card	(yellow card) (red card)	Red card	Yellow card	(yellow card) (red card)	Red card	Yellow card	(yellow card) (red card)	Red card	Yellow card	(yellow card) (red card)	Red card
12	Sven Scheuer	1	0	0	0	0	0	0	0	0	0	0	1	1	0	1
1	Oliver Kahn	1	0	0	0	0	0	0	0	0	0	0	0	1	0	0
2	Markus Babbel	3	0	0	0	0	0	0	0	0	0	0	0	3	0	0
5	Thomas Helmer	2	0	0	0	0	0	0	0	0	1	0	0	3	0	0
	Jorginho	1	0	0	0	0	0	0	0	0	1	0	0	2	0	0
4	Oliver Kreuzer	7	0	0	0	0	0	0	0	1	1	0	0	8	0	1
	Samuel Kuffour	0	1	0	0	0	0	0	0	0	2	0	0	2	1	0
	Hans Pflügler	1	0	0	0	0	0	0	0	0	0	0	0	1	0	0
3	Dieter Frey	9	0	0	0	0	0	0	0	0	2	0	0	11	0	0
16	Dietmar Hamann	2	0	0	0	0	0	0	0	0	2	0	0	4	0	0
10	Lothar Matthäus	4	0	0	0	0	0	0	0	0	1	0	0	5	0	0
6	Christian Nerlinger	6	1	0	1	0	0	0	0	0	1	0	0	8	1	0
7	Mehmet Scholl	4	0	0	0	0	0	0	0	0	0	0	0	4	0	0
	Markus Schupp	5	1	0	0	0	0	0	0	0	2	0	0	7	0	0
	Michael Sternkopf	4	0	0	1	0	0	0	0	0	0	0	0	5	0	0
	Alain Sutter	1	0	0	0	0	0	0	0	0	1	0	0	2	0	0
	Christian Ziege	10	0	0	0	0	0	0	0	0	1	0	0	11	0	0
19	Emil Kostadinov	2	0	0	0	0	0	0	0	0	0	0	0	2	0	0
9	Jean-Pierre Papin	1	1	0	1	0	0	0	0	0	2	0	0	4	1	0
21	Alexander Zickler	1	0	0	0	0	0	0	0	0	1	0	0	2	0	0
	Mazinho	0	0	0	0	0	0	0	0	0	1	0	0	1	0	0
Totals		59	4	0	3	0	0	0	0	1	19	0	1	81	4	2

== Transfers ==
=== In ===
No.	Pos.	Nat.	Name	Age	EU	Moving from	Type	Transfer window	Ends	Transfer fee	Source
19	FW	(Bulgaria)	Emil Kostadinov	27	Non-EU	Deportivo La Coruña (Spain)	Loan	Winter	June 1995	€250,000	
9	FW	(France)	Jean-Pierre Papin	30	EU	Milan (Italy)	Transfer	Summer		€2.75 Million	
1	GK	(Germany)	Oliver Kahn	25	EU	Karlsruher SC	Transfer	Summer		€2.3 Million	
	MF	(Switzerland)	Alain Sutter	26	Non-EU	1. FC Nürnberg	Transfer	Summer		€1.4 Million	
2	DF	(Germany)	Markus Babbel	21	EU	Hamburger SV	Loan return	Summer		N/A	
	FW	(Brazil)	Mazinho	28	Non-EU	Internacional (Brazil)	Loan return	Summer		N/A	

=== Out ===
No.	Pos.	Nat.	Name	Age	EU	Moving to	Type	Transfer window	Transfer fee	Source
	DF	(Brazil)	Jorginho	30	Non-EU	Kashima Antlers (Japan)	Transfer	Winter	€1.75 Million	
	FW	(Brazil)	Mazinho	29	Non-EU	Flamengo (Brazil)	Transfer	Winter	Free	
	FW	(Colombia)	Adolfo Valencia	26	Non-EU	Atlético Madrid (Spain)	Transfer	Summer	€2.25 Million	
	MF	(Germany)	Olaf Thon	28	EU	Schalke 04	Transfer	Summer	€1.25 Million	
	FW	(Germany)	Bruno Labbadia	28	EU	1. FC Köln	Transfer	Summer	€1.25 Million	
	DF	(Germany)	Markus Münch	21	EU	Bayer Leverkusen	Transfer	Summer	€750,000	
	GK	(Germany)	Raimond Aumann	30	EU	Beşiktaş (Turkey)	Transfer	Summer	€400,000	
	DF	(Germany)	Roland Grahammer	30	EU		End of career		N/A	
