= 1998 DFB-Pokal final =

- Match programme cover
- Event: 1997–98 DFB-Pokal
Bayern Munich	MSV Duisburg
2	1
- Date: 16 May 1998
- Venue: Olympiastadion, Berlin
- Referee: Hartmut Strampe (Handorf)
- Attendance: 75,800
- Weather: Clear; 18 °C (64 °F); 42% humidity

The 1998 DFB-Pokal final decided the winner of the 1997–98 DFB-Pokal, the 55th season of Germany's premier knockout football cup competition. It was played on 16 May 1998 at the Olympiastadion in Berlin. Bayern Munich won the match 2–1 against MSV Duisburg to claim their ninth cup title.

== Route to the final ==
The DFB-Pokal began with 64 teams in a single-elimination knockout cup competition. There were a total of five rounds leading up to the final. Teams were drawn against each other, and the winner after 90 minutes would advance. If still tied, 30 minutes of extra time was played. If the score was still level, a penalty shoot-out was used to determine the winner.

Note: In all results below, the score of the finalist is given first (H: home; A: away).

Bayern Munich		Round	MSV Duisburg
Opponent	Result	1997–98 DFB-Pokal	Opponent	Result
DJK Waldberg (A)	16–1	Round 1	Rot-Weiss Essen (A)	2–1
VfL Wolfsburg (A)	3–3 (a.e.t.) (4–3 p)	Round 2	VfL Bochum (H)	1–0
1. FC Kaiserslautern (A)	2–1	Round of 16	Eintracht Frankfurt (H)	1–0
Bayer Leverkusen (H)	2–0	Quarter-finals	Carl Zeiss Jena (A)	2–1
VfB Stuttgart (H)	3–0	Semi-finals	Eintracht Trier (A)	1–1 (a.e.t.) (10–9 p)

== Match ==
=== Details ===
16 May 1998
19:30 CEST

Bayern Munich	2–1	MSV Duisburg
Babbel 70'; Basler 89'	Report	Salou 20'

Olympiastadion, Berlin
Attendance: 75,800
Referee: Hartmut Strampe (Handorf)

Bayern Munich	MSV Duisburg

GK	1	(Germany) Oliver Kahn
SW	10	(Germany) Lothar Matthäus
CB	2	(Germany) Markus Babbel
CB	5	(Germany) Thomas Helmer (c)		(substituted off) 34'
RWB	14	(Germany) Mario Basler
LWB	11	(France) Bixente Lizarazu		(substituted off) 34'
CM	16	(Germany) Dietmar Hamann
CM	6	(Germany) Christian Nerlinger
CM	18	(Germany) Michael Tarnat	Yellow card
SS	7	(Germany) Mehmet Scholl		(substituted off) 76'
CF	9	(Brazil) Giovane Élber
Substitutes:
GK	12	(Germany) Sven Scheuer
DF	4	(Ghana) Samuel Kuffour
MF	8	(Germany) Thomas Strunz		(substituted on) 76'
MF	17	(Germany) Thorsten Fink		(substituted on) 34'
FW	19	(Germany) Carsten Jancker	Yellow card	(substituted on) 34'
FW	20	(Italy) Ruggiero Rizzitelli
FW	21	(Germany) Alexander Zickler
Manager:
(Italy) Giovanni Trapattoni

GK	12	(Norway) Thomas Gill
CB	7	(Federal Republic of Yugoslavia) Slobodan Komljenović
CB	4	(Germany) Torsten Wohlert (c)
RWB	24	(Germany) Carsten Wolters
LWB	3	(Germany) Dietmar Hirsch
DM	21	(Germany) Thomas Vana
CM	6	(Denmark) Stig Tøfting
CM	5	(Poland) Tomasz Hajto
AM	20	(Germany) Michael Zeyer
CF	18	(Germany) Uwe Spies
CF	9	(Togo) Bachirou Salou	(substituted off) 73'
Substitutes:
GK	29	(Lithuania) Gintaras Staučė
DF	13	(Germany) Markus Reiter
DF	17	(Germany) Thomas Puschmann
MF	12	(Germany) Markus Osthoff	(substituted on) 73'
MF	19	(Germany) Jörg Neun
FW	11	(Moldova) Alexandru Popovici
FW	25	(Sweden) Niklas Skoog
Manager:
(Germany) Friedhelm Funkel

Match rules

- 90 minutes.
- 30 minutes of extra time if necessary.
- Penalty shoot-out if scores still level.
- Seven named substitutes, of which up to three may be used.
