= Dietmar Hamann =

German footballer (born 1973)

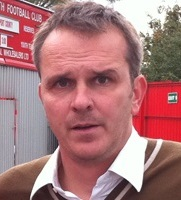
- Hamann in 2011

Personal information
- Full name: Dietmar Johann Wolfgang Hamann
- Date of birth: 27 August 1973 (age 53)
- Place of birth: Waldsassen, West Germany
- Height: 1.89 m (6 ft 2 in)
- Position: Defensive midfielder

Youth career
- 1978–1989: Wacker München
- 1989–1992: Bayern Munich

Senior career*
Years	Team	Apps	(Gls)
1992–1994	Bayern Munich (A)	24	(8)
1993–1998	Bayern Munich	105	(6)
1998–1999	Newcastle United	23	(4)
1999–2006	Liverpool	191	(8)
2006	Bolton Wanderers	0	(0)
2006–2009	Manchester City	54	(1)
2010–2011	Milton Keynes Dons	12	(0)
Total		409	(27)

International career
1993	Germany U20	3	(0)
1993–1995	Germany U21	10	(2)
1997–2005	Germany	59	(5)

Managerial career
- 2011: Stockport County
Medal record
Representing Germany
Men's football
FIFA World Cup
Runner-up	2002 Korea/Japan
- * Club domestic league appearances and goals

Dietmar Johann Wolfgang Hamann (German pronunciation: [ˈdiːtmaʁ ˈhaːman]; born 27 August 1973) is a German football pundit and former professional player.

Throughout his career, he played for Bayern Munich, Newcastle United, Liverpool and Manchester City primarily in a defensive midfield position. He was a member of the Germany national team from 1997 until 2006 and represented his nation in two FIFA World Cups and two UEFA European Championships, reaching the 2002 FIFA World Cup final. He is known in Ireland as a football pundit on RTÉ's live coverage of major European and international competitions.

Throughout his playing career Hamann gained a reputation for being a highly consistent and reliable player. He is highly respected by supporters of Liverpool due in large part to his involvement in the club's victory in the 2005 UEFA Champions League final.

== Club career ==
=== Early career ===
Hamann began his career at the little-known Wacker München. After impressing as a junior, he joined Bayern Munich as a 16-year-old in 1989 and debuted for the Bayern professional team in 1993. Hamann joined a team led by Lothar Matthäus, Thomas Helmer, Christian Ziege and Oliver Kahn and played five games, mostly as a right winger. At first, Hamann was only a so-called Vertragsamateur (i.e. an amateur player who had the licence for playing professional games). Still, he won his first German championship as a bench player. In the next season, Bayern suffered a major injury wave which claimed midfielders Matthäus, Swiss international Alain Sutter, talent Dieter Frey and veteran Markus Schupp, which allowed Hamann to become a regular; he played 30 Bundesliga games and established himself as a valuable role player, playing either right wing or defensive midfield.

He earned himself a full professional contract and was an important player in the 1995–96 campaign, in which Bayern recruited striker Jürgen Klinsmann, coach Otto Rehhagel and midfielders Andi Herzog, Thomas Strunz and Ciriaco Sforza, but the team was torn apart by heavy internal struggles. Although Hamann was overshadowed by these new midfield recruits, he played in 20 games and provided some stability for the infighting Bayern squad. Bayern finished the season in second place and Rehhagel was dismissed, but ended the season by winning the UEFA Cup.

The 1996–97 season was to become Hamann's breakthrough. After being a bench player most of his career until then, new coach Giovanni Trapattoni made him a starting defensive midfielder, and new recruit Mario Basler took the right wing. Hamann played in 23 games, also making his debut in the Germany national team and won his second Germany championship with Bayern. In his private life, Hamann had to overcome a disturbing period when he broke down unconscious and was diagnosed with a stroke, but made a full recovery. The next season ended disappointingly for Bayern who lagged behind newly promoted Kaiserslautern for the vast majority of the season and finished second. Now an undisputed starter, Hamann played in 28 games and scored two goals. The season ended on a high for Bayern when they secured the DFB-Pokal against MSV Duisburg.

=== Newcastle United ===
After playing for his country in the 1998 World Cup, he joined Newcastle United, managed at the time by Kenny Dalglish, for £5.5 million. Overcoming an early foot injury, Hamann played in 31 matches and scored five goals. He played for Newcastle in the 1999 FA Cup final. In July 1999, he opted to join Gerard Houllier's Liverpool, who signed him for £8 million.

=== Liverpool ===
Hamann established himself as an influential midfielder for Liverpool throughout his seven years at the club. All in all, Hamann played in 191 league games and scored eight goals. In the 2000–01 season, Hamann won his first big English trophy when Liverpool won a much-celebrated cup treble (League Cup, FA Cup and UEFA Cup) and a place in the Champions League. Hamann also played the full 90 minutes and assisted Liverpool's second goal (scored by Michael Owen) in the team's 2–0 victory over Manchester United in the 2003 Worthington Cup final.

Hamann established himself as a major first team player for Liverpool throughout his first few seasons.

Hamann played a major part in the 2005 UEFA Champions League final win over AC Milan. Although he was suffering a broken toe during the final, Hamann's substitution for Steve Finnan at half time was the catalyst for Liverpool's historic fightback. The team rallied after being 3–0 down to bring the game back to 3–3 and finally won in the penalty shootout; Hamann also showed a great amount of composure and bravery, as he took and converted the first Liverpool penalty with his broken foot. This was not the only key part he played in their Champions league success. Earlier in the tournament, Hamann had been forced to stand in for Liverpool's key player Steven Gerrard in the first leg of the last 16 round against Bayer Leverkusen. He excelled in the match and scored a late free-kick as Liverpool won the match 3–1.

Hamann won the FA Cup with Liverpool in May 2006, coming on as a substitute in the second-half. He more than played his part in another trophy win for the Reds, who were 3–2 down to West Ham United at the time he came on. Steven Gerrard scored an injury-time leveller for Liverpool to take the match to extra-time. Liverpool would go on to win the Cup on penalties after a goalless extra-time. Once again, Hamann scored the first penalty in the shoot-out. When it was clear his time at Liverpool was coming to a close, David Moyes, the manager of Liverpool's rival club Everton, called him to try and convince him to join the club, but Hamann refused, saying: “David, I appreciate the interest, but, after all the years I've had at Liverpool and the things I've experienced, it's just not possible to join Everton".

=== Manchester City ===
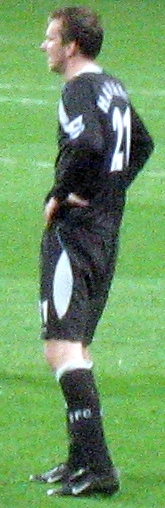
Hamann with Manchester City in 2007

In June 2006, Hamann was given permission to talk to Bolton Wanderers about a potential transfer to the North West club. Hamann admitted that he would be saddened to leave Liverpool but would make "the best decision for my future". Hamann actually signed a pre-contract in June 2006, to become a Bolton Wanderers player but had a "change of heart". He joined Bolton for less than one day before a move to Manchester City.

On 12 July, he instead signed for Manchester City, with City agreeing to pay £400,000 compensation to Bolton. On 13 February, he signed a contract until the end of the 2008–09 season and scored his first goal for the club in a UEFA Cup qualifying first round match against EB/Streymur.

However, on 28 August 2013 during Colin Murray's morning radio show with Talksport, Bolton Wanderers chairman Phil Gartside announced that the club had never officially signed the midfielder and that they had "put (the papers) in the drawer". A Premier League investigation found that this wasn't the case and that Bolton had indeed signed Hamann, and expressed confusion as to why Gartside had lied about it.

On 1 July 2009, he was released by Manchester City as his contract expired. Hamann announced on 16 July that he intended to stay in England.

On transfer deadline day in September 2009, BBC Sport quoted Hamann as stating: "Yes, Sven [-Göran Eriksson] phoned me the other day to see if I wanted to sign for Notts County, but I said I wasn't interested at the moment as I feel I can still play at a higher level. There are a couple of things in Germany and I'll make my mind up by the end of the week. I have spoken to a couple of teams in England but that hasn't come to anything yet. Obviously, I can still sign after the deadline so maybe if teams don't get the players they want today then I will hear something".

=== Milton Keynes Dons ===
On 20 May 2010, Hamann signed a one-year contract as a player-coach at Milton Keynes Dons but only made 12 appearances as a player. When he left the club on 3 February 2011 to join Leicester City as a First Team Coach, he effectively retired from a playing career.

=== Comeback as player with TuS Haltern ===
After retiring in February 2011 and managing Stockport County in July 2011, Hamann went back to playing football, and this time for amateur-side TuS Haltern. He signed a contract with the club on 7 March 2015 at the age of 41.

== International career ==
Hamann played for Germany at under-21 level before making his full international debut in a friendly against South Africa in November 1997. He was selected by manager Berti Vogts for the 1998 FIFA World Cup, being, at almost 25, the second youngest player in an over-aged Germany squad. During the group stage, Hamann drifted in and out of the starting XI, finally breaking into the team when Germany gained momentum in the second round game against Mexico. However, after a quarter-final defeat against Croatia, Germany was out of the tournament.

During the UEFA Euro 2000 qualifying, Hamann established himself as a key player for a transitional Germany side. He played in all of Germany's games at the final tournament as they exited in the first round. Hamann was the last player to score at the old Wembley Stadium before its demolition when he scored the winning goal in Germany's 2002 World Cup qualifier against England in October 2000.

Alongside Michael Ballack and Bernd Schneider, Hamann was one of the key players in Germany's surprising run to the 2002 FIFA World Cup Final. He became only the second Liverpool player after Roger Hunt in 1966 to play in a World Cup Final while still at the club, but finished on the losing side as Brazil won 2–0 in Yokohama. In the 67th minute of that match, Hamann lost the ball to opposing forward Ronaldo, who passed to Rivaldo, who shot from outside the area; goalkeeper Oliver Kahn gave a rebound, allowing Ronaldo to score and give Brazil a 1–0 lead. The subsequent Euro 2004 turned out to be Hamann's last tournament. Again, the Euro ended with a disappointing first round exit for Germany. A 1–2 defeat against a Czech Republic side resting its key players proved to be Hamann's penultimate international game.

After a strong performance in the 2005 Champions League final, Hamann was recalled for the Germany squad by new manager Jürgen Klinsmann. In the 2–2 draw against the Netherlands, Hamann produced a lacklustre performance, apparently convincing Klinsmann that he did not possess the required pace for that kind of level anymore. Hamann was dropped from the squad for the subsequent friendlies. Having not been selected for the German squad in the 2006 FIFA World Cup, he decided to officially retire from international football.

== Coaching and management career ==
=== Milton Keynes Dons and Leicester City ===
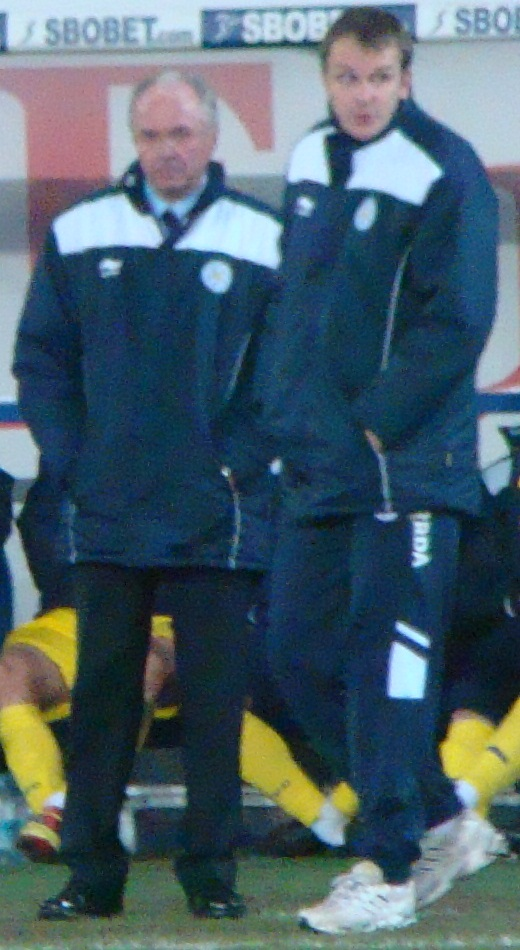
Hamann (right) as first team coach of Leicester City, alongside Sven-Göran Eriksson

On 20 May 2010, Hamann signed a one-year contract as a player-coach at Milton Keynes Dons. He left the club on 3 February 2011 to join Leicester City as a First Team Coach.

=== Stockport County ===
On 5 July 2011, Hamann was appointed as the new manager of newly relegated Conference Premier club Stockport County, replacing Ray Mathias. His appointment was made after businessman Tony Evans headed a consortium proposing taking over the club. In his first league game in charge of Stockport, Hamann's side drew 1–1 with Forest Green Rovers at The New Lawn. The match was broadcast live on Premier Sports. Hamann resigned as Stockport County boss on 7 November 2011, citing the failure of the proposed takeover by Tony Evans to materialise; his team were languishing in 17th place having taken only three wins from his nineteen league games in charge.

== Broadcasting career ==
Hamann was enlisted by RTÉ Sport for their squad of pundits ahead of the 2010 FIFA World Cup in South Africa. He returned to RTÉ's team during UEFA Euro 2012 and the 2014 FIFA World Cup in Brazil.

More recently, in neighbouring Britain, Hamann has guested as a pundit on the BBC's Match of the Day 2. He has also appeared on Sky Sports's football coverage as a pundit, usually when the match involves a club he has played for, most commonly Liverpool, and has also appeared regularly on LFC TV during their live pre-game and post game analysis of Liverpool home games from Anfield.

He was again part of RTÉ Sport's studio coverage for the finals of UEFA Euro 2016, beginning with an appearance for the opening night match between tournament hosts France and Romania. In assessing Ireland's chances for the tournament, Hamann also said he had been in Dublin to see Ireland beat world champions Germany during the qualifying campaign.

He was additionally retained by RTÉ Sport as a studio pundit for Champions League and Irish International games for the full football season 2016–2017, having been an occasional pundit on Champions League matches during the 2015-16 season.

He was back on the RTÉ Panel again for the 2018 FIFA World Cup, the rescheduled UEFA Euro 2020 in 2021, the 2022 FIFA World Cup, and UEFA Euro 2024. In 2026, he was again part of the RTÉ Panel for the 2026 FIFA World Cup.

Hamann also works as a pundit for Sky Sports Bundesliga in Germany.

== Writing ==
Hamann is also the European columnist for twentyfour7, where he passes regular comment on the progress and state of the game on the continent.

He released his autobiography, The Didi Man: My Love Affair with Liverpool, co-written with Malcolm McClean, in February 2012 and it became a Sunday Times Best Seller.

== Personal life ==
Hamann has two daughters, Chiara and Luna. He is the brother of Matthias Hamann, who also played in the Bundesliga, mainly for Bayern rival 1860 Munich. Hamann enjoys cricket and once played for Alderley Edge CC 2nd XI vs Neston CC 2nd XI in the Cheshire County Cricket League, taking a catch in the game. He became interested in the sport during the 2005 Ashes series.

On 23 February 2010, the former German international was found guilty of driving under the influence and sentenced to a 16-month driving ban while also being fined nearly £2,000. He had been stopped by police at junction six of the M56 near his home in Styal, Cheshire, at 12.15 am on 12 July 2009.

In cooperation with Standard Chartered Bank, an institution for which he also acted as an ambassador, Hamann hosted a football clinic in Nigeria.

In 2012, Hamann revealed the gambling problems he suffered towards the end of his career, an addiction that has been "not healthy or sustainable" and lasted for many years.

Hamann went to Australia on an extended holiday in 2018. In June 2019 he was charged with assault in the country. The charge was later dropped in December 2019 and no further action was taken.

== Career statistics ==
=== Club ===
Appearances and goals by club, season and competition
Club	Season	League			National cup (Note: Includes DFB-Pokal, FA Cup)		League cup (Note: Includes League Cup)		Continental		Total	
Club	Season	Division	Apps	Goals	Apps	Goals	Apps	Goals	Apps	Goals	Apps	Goals
Bayern Munich	1993–94	Bundesliga	5	1	0	0	—		0	0	6	1
Bayern Munich	1994–95	Bundesliga	30	0	1	0	—		6	0	37	0
Bayern Munich	1995–96	Bundesliga	20	2	2	0	—		7	0	29	2
Bayern Munich	1996–97	Bundesliga	23	1	4	0	—		2	0	30	1
Bayern Munich	1997–98	Bundesliga	28	2	5	3	2	0	8	1	41	6
Bayern Munich	Total		106	6	12	3	2	0	23	1	143	10
Newcastle United	1998–99	Premier League	23	4	7	1	1	0	0	0	31	5
Liverpool	1999–2000	Premier League	28	1	2	0	0	0	0	0	30	1
Liverpool	2000–01	Premier League	30	2	5	1	5	0	13	0	53	3
Liverpool	2001–02	Premier League	31	1	2	0	1	0	13	0	47	1
Liverpool	2002–03	Premier League	30	2	1	0	1	0	9	0	41	2
Liverpool	2003–04	Premier League	25	2	4	0	1	0	5	1	35	3
Liverpool	2004–05	Premier League	30	0	0	0	3	0	10	1	43	1
Liverpool	2005–06	Premier League	17	0	2	0	1	0	11	0	31	0
Liverpool	Total		191	8	16	1	12	0	61	2	280	11
Manchester City	2006–07	Premier League	16	1	2	0	1	0	0	0	19	1
Manchester City	2007–08	Premier League	29	0	3	0	2	0	0	0	34	0
Manchester City	2008–09	Premier League	9	0	1	0	0	0	8	1	18	1
Manchester City	Total		54	1	6	0	3	0	8	1	71	2
Milton Keynes Dons	2010–11	League One	12	0	0	0	1	0	0	0	13	0
Career total			386	18	41	5	19	0	92	4	538	27

=== International ===
Appearances and goals by national team and year
National team	Year	Apps	Goals
Germany	1997	1	1
Germany	1998	12	0
Germany	1999	6	1
Germany	2000	11	1
Germany	2001	6	0
Germany	2002	12	1
Germany	2003	1	0
Germany	2004	9	1
Germany	2005	1	0
Total		59	5

Scores and results list Germany's goal tally first, score column indicates score after each Hamann goal.

List of international goals scored by Dietmar Hamann
No.	Date	Venue	Opponent	Score	Result	Competition
1	15 November 1997	Rheinstadion, Düsseldorf, Germany	South Africa	1–0	3–0	Friendly
2	26 March 1999	Windsor Park, Belfast, Northern Ireland	Northern Ireland	3–0	3–0	UEFA Euro 2000 qualifying
3	7 October 2000	Wembley Stadium, London, England	England	1–0	1–0	2002 FIFA World Cup qualifying
4	13 February 2002	Fritz-Walter-Stadion, Kaiserslautern, Germany	Israel	3–1	7–1	Friendly
5	31 March 2004	Müngersdorfer Stadion, Cologne, Germany	Belgium	2–0	3–0	Friendly

== Managerial statistics ==
As of 7 November 2011

Managerial record by team and tenure
Team	From	To	Record					Ref
Team	From	To	P	W	D	L	Win %	Ref
Stockport County	5 July 2011	7 November 2011	20	3	10	7	15.0	
Total			20	3	10	7	15.0	—

== Honours ==
Bayern Munich

- Bundesliga: 1993–94, 1996–97
- DFB-Pokal: 1997–98
- DFB-Ligapokal: 1997
- UEFA Cup: 1995–96

Newcastle United

- FA Cup runner-up: 1998–99

Liverpool

- FA Cup: 2000–01, 2005–06
- Football League Cup: 2000–01, 2002–03; runner-up: 2004–05
- FA Charity Shield: 2001
- UEFA Champions League: 2004–05
- UEFA Cup: 2000–01
- UEFA Super Cup: 2001, 2005
- FIFA Club World Championship runner-up: 2005

Germany

- FIFA World Cup runner-up: 2002

Individual

- FIFA World Cup All-Star Team: 2002 (reserve)
- BBC Goal of the Season: 2003–04

Orders

- Silbernes Lorbeerblatt: 2002
