= Thomas Vana =

German association football player

Personal information
- Date of birth: 9 October 1972 (age 54)
- Height: 1.85 m (6 ft 1 in)
- Position: Defensive midfielder

Senior career*
Years	Team	Apps	(Gls)
1993–1994	SSVg Velbert		
1994–1995	Bayer 04 Leverkusen II		
1995	Bayer 04 Leverkusen	0	(0)
1995–2004	MSV Duisburg	120	(9)
Total		120	(9)
- * Club domestic league appearances and goals

Thomas Vana (born 9 October 1972) is a German former footballer who played as a defensive midfielder. He played for SSVg Velbert and Bayer 04 Leverkusen before joining MSV Duisburg in 1995, where he made 120 league appearances and scored 9 goals. He also played in the 1998 DFB-Pokal Final for Duisburg, where they lost 2–1 to FC Bayern Munich.
