= Carsten Lakies =

German football player and manager

Personal information
- Date of birth: 8 January 1971 (age 55)
- Place of birth: Kassel, West Germany
- Height: 1.83 m (6 ft 0 in)
- Position: Striker

Youth career
- 1976–1989: KSV Hessen Kassel

Senior career*
Years	Team	Apps	(Gls)
1989–1992	KSV Hessen Kassel	43	(11)
1992–1994	FSV Frankfurt	0	(0)
1994–1996	SV Darmstadt 98	63	(28)
1996–1997	Bayern Munich (A)	28	(22)
1996–1997	Bayern Munich	1	(0)
1997–1998	Hertha BSC	3	(0)
1998–1999	SV Waldhof Mannheim	13	(2)
1999–2000	Karlsruher SC	21	(1)
2000–2001	Chemnitzer FC	7	(0)
2001–2002	VfR Mannheim	33	(9)
2002–2003	SV Darmstadt 98	36	(10)
2003	1. SC Feucht	15	(2)
2004	Stuttgarter Kickers	9	(0)
2004–2007	OSC Vellmar	80	(26)
2007–2008	KSV Baunatal	23	(2)
Total		373	(113)

Managerial career
- 2007–2008: KSV Baunatal (assistant)
- 2008–2010: KSV Baunatal
- 2010–2011: SVG Göttingen
- 2011–2013: FSC Lohfelden
- 2014: Cerezo Osaka (assistant)
- * Club domestic league appearances and goals

Carsten Lakies (born 8 January 1971 in Kassel) is a German football coach and a former player.

== Career ==
Lakies spent two seasons in the Bundesliga with FC Bayern Munich and Hertha BSC. Lakies was involved in an incident during the 1996–97 Bundesliga season, when he was substituted into the game during a match between Bayern Munich and SC Freiburg. At a disappointing score of 0–0 with only ten minutes to play, coach Giovanni Trapattoni brought Lakies on for star striker Jürgen Klinsmann, who, in anger about the decision, kicked a nearby advertising can, an action that brought significant media attention.

== Coaching career ==
In summer 2007, he began his coaching career at KSV Baunatal. In summer 2010, he was named as manager of SVG Göttingen.

== Honours ==
- Bundesliga champion: 1996–97
