= Samuel Kuffour =

Ghanaian footballer (born 1976)

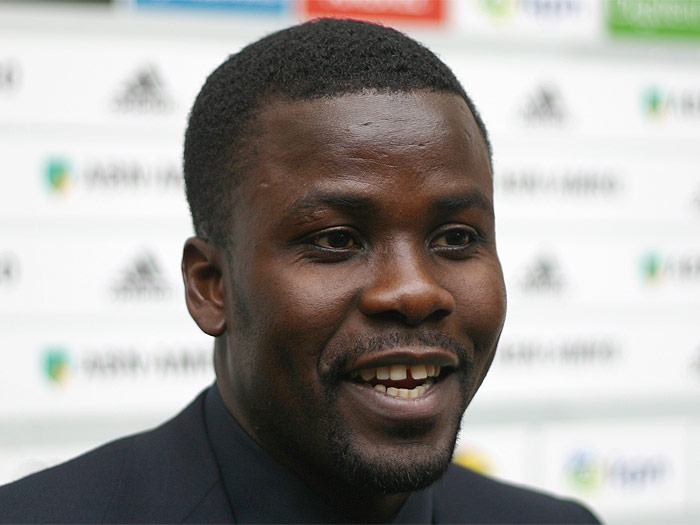
- Kuffour in 2010

Personal information
- Full name: Samuel Osei Kuffour
- Date of birth: 3 September 1976 (age 50)
- Place of birth: Kumasi, Ghana
- Height: 1.78 m (5 ft 10 in)
- Position: Centre-back

Youth career
- Fantomas Kumasi
- 1990–1991: King Faisal Babes
- 1991–1993: Torino

Senior career*
Years	Team	Apps	(Gls)
1993–2005	Bayern Munich	175	(7)
1995–1996	→ 1. FC Nürnberg (loan)	12	(1)
2005–2008	Roma	21	(0)
2006–2007	→ Livorno (loan)	18	(0)
2008	→ Ajax (loan)	2	(0)
2009	Asante Kotoko		
Total		228	(8)

International career
1993–2006	Ghana	54	(3)
- * Club domestic league appearances and goals

Medal record

Men's association football

Representing Ghana

Olympic Games
Bronze medal – third place	1992 Barcelona	Team competition

Samuel Osei "Sammy" Kuffour (born 3 September 1976) is a Ghanaian former professional footballer who played as a centre-back.

Known for his physical power, Kuffour is best remembered for his time with Bayern Munich, whom he represented for over a decade, winning a total of 14 honours, and playing in nearly 250 official matches. Kuffour appeared with the Ghana national team in the 2006 World Cup as well as in five Africa Cup of Nations. Notable other wins include: a 2000–01 UEFA Champions League, scoring the winning goal in the 2001 Intercontinental Cup, and as a sixteen year old was on the Olympic Football team which won bronze in 1992.

After retiring in 2009, he has had multiple roles in sports commentary, and management roles in Asante Kotoko S.C. and the Ghana National Team.

== Club career ==
=== Bayern Munich ===
Born in Ghana, Kuffour was brought to Europe by Torino FC in 1991 aged just 15, after playing junior football for local teams in his native country. He joined Bayern Munich in 1993 from the Italian club. After a season-long loan spell with 1. FC Nürnberg in the 2. Bundesliga, he made his breakthrough with the Bavarians.

Kuffour spent 11 seasons with Bayern, rising from the youth teams to be a prominent first-squad member who lifted the UEFA Champions League with the club. He was an integral part of the squad that won the 2000–01 Champions League, also scoring the winning goal in the 2001 Intercontinental Cup, being subsequently named man of the match. Also in that year, he finished second in African Footballer of the Year's voting, repeating the feat accomplished in 1999.

Kuffour was also part of the Bayern team which lost to Manchester United due to two late goals in the 1999 UEFA Champions League Final, famously beating the ground in frustration afterwards, a gesture that endeared him to Bayern supporters. He also became the youngest defender to ever score in the Champions League, at the age of 18 years and 61 days, during the match against Spartak Moscow on 2 November 1994, which ended in a 2–2 draw. Kuffour made over 60 UEFA Champions League appearances, being one of the most decorated African players of all time. After twelve seasons in Munich and 175 Bundesliga appearances, Kuffour left Bayern in 2005.

=== Roma ===
Kuffour left Bayern in the summer of 2005 and signed a three-year deal with AS Roma in a free transfer, thus returning to Italy. He made 21 appearances in his debut season, having spent a period of the season away on international duty. In his second year, he was loaned to UEFA Cup competitor and fellow Serie A team AS Livorno Calcio. He played his 89th and last match in European cup competitions for Livorno.

=== After Roma ===
In August 2007, Kuffour had a trial with Premier League side Sunderland, with a view to a permanent move. However, manager Roy Keane confirmed he would not be joining the club, in a post match interview after Sunderland's defeat to Liverpool.

On 28 January 2008, AFC Ajax received Kuffour on a six-month loan contract, with an option for two more seasons. He was released following a lack of form, and was also deemed surplus to requirements by Roma boss Luciano Spalletti, thus becoming a free agent.

In August, it was thought that Kuffour had joined Russian Premier League side FC Khimki. However, it was announced on 10 September by his agent that he had retired from professional football with immediate effect. Kuffour rejected the news and stated his desire to continue his career; in January 2009, he was linked to Major League Soccer side Chicago Fire S.C. – the CEO of US-based Sports to Develop Destitute claimed he was helping the player finalise the deal.

=== Asante Kotoko and retirement ===
In April 2009, Kuffour finally returned to Ghana after a 19-year absence, seeing his career out with a three-month deal with Asante Kotoko. He however retired in late 2009 without playing an official match for the club.

== International career ==
A Ghana international for 13 years, Kuffour won his first cap as a 17-year-old in a game against Sierra Leone on 28 November 1993. He had previously been part of every national team – junior, youth and Olympic level – and became the full squad's captain at the age of 23.

Kuffour had burst onto the international scene at age 13. At junior level, he was a member of the Ghana side that won the 1991 FIFA U-17 World Championship in Italy and the one that was runner-up to Nigeria in the 1993 FIFA U-17 World Championship in Japan. At youth level, he appeared with the team that finished second to Brazil during the 1993 FIFA World Youth Championship in Australia.

Kuffour became the youngest Olympic Football Champion of all time when he collected bronze at the 1992 Olympics just before his 16th birthday. He was also a member of the squad that reached the quarter-finals at the same level in 1996.

Kuffour also made one appearance for his country at the 2006 FIFA World Cup against Italy. After a costly mistake in that first match, a 0–2 loss, he was dropped for the next three games as Ghana bowed out in the round-of-16 against Brazil.

On 12 January 2007, the Confederation of African Football voted Kuffour as a member of the Top 30 African Players of All Time.

== Life after football ==
=== Punditry ===
In 2010, after retiring from playing football, Kuffour entered into sports punditry working primarily with South Africa-based channel SuperSports, debuting with the 2010 FIFA World Cup. On 8 February 2015, he was shaved as he vowed on live TV within the SupersSports studios following the Black Stars failure to win the AFCON 2015 as he predicted. In 2018, he took a break from football punditry for the 2018 FIFA World Cup upon the advice of his doctor due to excessive travelling.

=== Football management ===
In August 2013, Kuffour was appointed as a board member of the Ghana-based football club Kumasi Asante Kotoko. On 2 October 2014, while serving as a board member, he was announced as the new CEO for Kumasi Asante Kotoko after being appointed by the club owner Otumfuo Nana Osei Tutu II. By 15 October, it had become apparent that the early announcement had caused a renege on that decision by the Otumfuor.

In February 2016, Kuffour was named as member of Black Starlets, the Ghana national under-17 football team, after playing for the team in the 1990s. On 16 January 2020, he was appointed as a member of the management board of the Black Stars, the Ghana senior national team.

== Personal life ==
In 2003, Kuffour revealed to the BBC, in an interview for the 'Heart and Soul' documentary, that he wanted to be a priest or a missionary when he retired from football. In the interview, he also spoke about the surprised reaction of some German players as he prayed before games, while also addressing the support he received from fellow Ghanaian Christians, especially those living in Munich. In the same interview, Kuffour also talked about the death of his daughter Godiva in a drowning accident in January that year. He explained that his Christian faith gave him the courage to face the future.

He is the uncle of the American soccer player Matai Akinmboni.

He is the father of footballer Sam Kuffour Jr., who signed for Hapoel Be'er Sheva in 2022. In February 2025, his son Sam Kuffour signed professional terms with English League Two side Colchester United.

== Career statistics ==
=== Club ===
Appearances and goals by club, season and competition
Club	Season	League			Cup (Note: Includes German Cup and Italian Cup.)		Continental (Note: Includes Champions League and UEFA Cup.)		Other (Note: Includes German League Cup and Intercontinental Cup.)		Total		Ref.
Club	Season	Division	Apps	Goals	Apps	Goals	Apps	Goals	Apps	Goals	Apps	Goals	Ref.
Bayern Munich	1994–95	Bundesliga	9	0	0	0	4	1	—		13	1	
Bayern Munich	1996–97	Bundesliga	22	0	2	0	1	0	—		25	0	
Bayern Munich	1997–98	Bundesliga	17	2	3	0	5	0	—		25	2	
Bayern Munich	1998–99	Bundesliga	15	0	3	0	8	0	—		26	0	
Bayern Munich	1999–2000	Bundesliga	18	2	3	1	13	0	—		34	3	
Bayern Munich	2000–01	Bundesliga	23	1	1	0	13	0	1	0	38	1	
Bayern Munich	2001–02	Bundesliga	21	0	3	0	14	0	2	0	40	0	
Bayern Munich	2002–03	Bundesliga	20	1	4	0	5	0	1	0	30	1	
Bayern Munich	2003–04	Bundesliga	23	1	2	0	7	0	1	0	33	1	
Bayern Munich	2004–05	Bundesliga	7	0	2	0	4	0	0	0	13	0	
Bayern Munich	Total		175	7	23	1	74	1	5	0	277	9	—
Bayern Munich II	1994–95	Regionalliga Süd			3	0	—		—		3	0	
Bayern Munich II	1995–96	Regionalliga Süd			1	0	—		—		1	0	
Bayern Munich II	2004–05	Regionalliga Süd	1	0	—		—		—		1	0	
Bayern Munich II	Total		1	0	4	0	0	0	0	0			—
1. FC Nürnberg (loan)	1995–96	2. Bundesliga	12	1	0	0	—		—		12	1	
Roma	2005–06	Serie A	21	0	3	0	7	1	—		31	1	
Livorno (loan)	2006–07	Serie A	18	0	0	0	8	0	—		26	0	
Ajax (loan)	2007–08	Eredivisie	2	0	0	0	0	0	—		2	0	
Asante Kotoko	2009	Ghana Premier League											
Career total			229	8	30	1	89	2	5	0	353	11	—

=== International ===
Appearances and goals by national team and year
National team	Year	Apps	Goals
Ghana	1994	5	0
Ghana	1995	3	0
Ghana	1996	9	0
Ghana	1997	5	1
Ghana	1998	5	0
Ghana	1999	2	0
Ghana	2000	8	2
Ghana	2001	2	0
Ghana	2002	1	0
Ghana	2003	2	0
Ghana	2004	5	0
Ghana	2005	1	0
Ghana	2006	6	0
Total		54	3

Scores and results list Ghana's goal tally first, score column indicates score after each Kuffour goal.

List of international goals scored by Samuel Kuffour
No.	Date	Venue	Opponent	Score	Result	Competition
1	13 July 1997	Accra Sports Stadium, Accra, Ghana	Zimbabwe	2–1	2–1	1998 African Cup of Nations qualification
2	8 April 2000	Sheikh Amri Abeid Memorial Stadium, Arusha, Tanzania	Tanzania	1–0	1–0	2002 FIFA World Cup qualification
3	23 April 2000	Ohene Djan Stadium, Accra, Ghana	Tanzania	1–0	3–2	2002 FIFA World Cup qualification

== Honours ==
Bayern Munich

- Bundesliga: 1996–97, 1998–99, 1999–2000, 2000–01, 2002–03, 2004–05
- DFB-Pokal: 1997–98, 1999–2000, 2002–03, 2004–05
- DFB-Ligapokal: 2000, 2004
- UEFA Champions League: 2000–01
- Intercontinental Cup: 2001

Ghana Youth

- FIFA U-17 World Championship: 1991
- Summer Olympic Games: Bronze medal 1992

Individual

- CAF Top 30 Best African Players of All Time
- Ghana Player of the Year: 1998, 1999, 2001
- Intercontinental Cup Most Valuable Player of the Match Award: 2001
- BBC African Footballer of the Year: 2001
- Africa Cup of Nations: Team of All Tournaments
- IFFHS All-time Africa Men's Dream Team: 2021
