= Thomas Puschmann (footballer) =

German footballer (born 1973)

Personal information
- Date of birth: 28 March 1973 (age 53)
- Place of birth: Geldern, West Germany
- Height: 1.85 m (6 ft 1 in)
- Position: Midfielder

Youth career
- –1991: KFC Uerdingen 05

Senior career*
Years	Team	Apps	(Gls)
1990-1993	KFC Uerdingen 05	35	(2)
1993–1998	MSV Duisburg	91	(6)
1998–2001	FC St. Pauli	54	(2)
2001–2002	KFC Uerdingen 05	17	(1)
2002–2004	SG Wattenscheid 09	49	(1)
2004–2006	1. FC Kleve	53	(3)
2006–2008	Schwarz-Weiß Essen	42	(2)
- * Club domestic league appearances and goals

Thomas Puschmann (born 28 March 1973) is a German former professional footballer who played as a midfielder.

== Early life and career ==
Thomas Puschmann was born on 28 March 1973 in Geldern. He began his professional career with KFC Uerdingen 05 from July 1990 to June 1993, a club competing in the Bundesliga at the time. He then moved to MSV Duisburg from July 1993 to June 1998.

Puschmann joined FC St. Pauli in July 1998. In early December 1999 he expressed disappointment at the criticism he received for his performance in St. Pauli's 3–1 loss against Alemannia Aachen. He lost his starting place at the beginning of the 2000–01 season and only made appearances before the winter break as a replacement for the injured libero Holger Stanislawski. In early Februar 2001 a bruise in his ankle became infected, destroying skin tissue, and a strip of skin "the width of a cigarette packet" had to be transplanted from his left thigh. He left the club in June 2001.

Puschmann returned to KFC Uerdingen 05 from July 2001 to June 2002, then to SG Wattenscheid 09 from July 2002 to June 2004. He moved to 1. FC Kleve in summer 2004. He played for Schwarz-Weiß Essen from July 2006 - June 2008. Puschmann made a total of 60 Bundesliga appearances (scoring 4 goals) and 81 matches in the second division (scoring 5 goals).

Puschmann also worked as rehab coach for FC. Rot-Weiss Essen from November 2010 to June 2015, then moved to Düsseldorfer SC 99 F.C. as an assistant coach from July 2015 to June 2017.
