= Christian Nerlinger =

German footballer

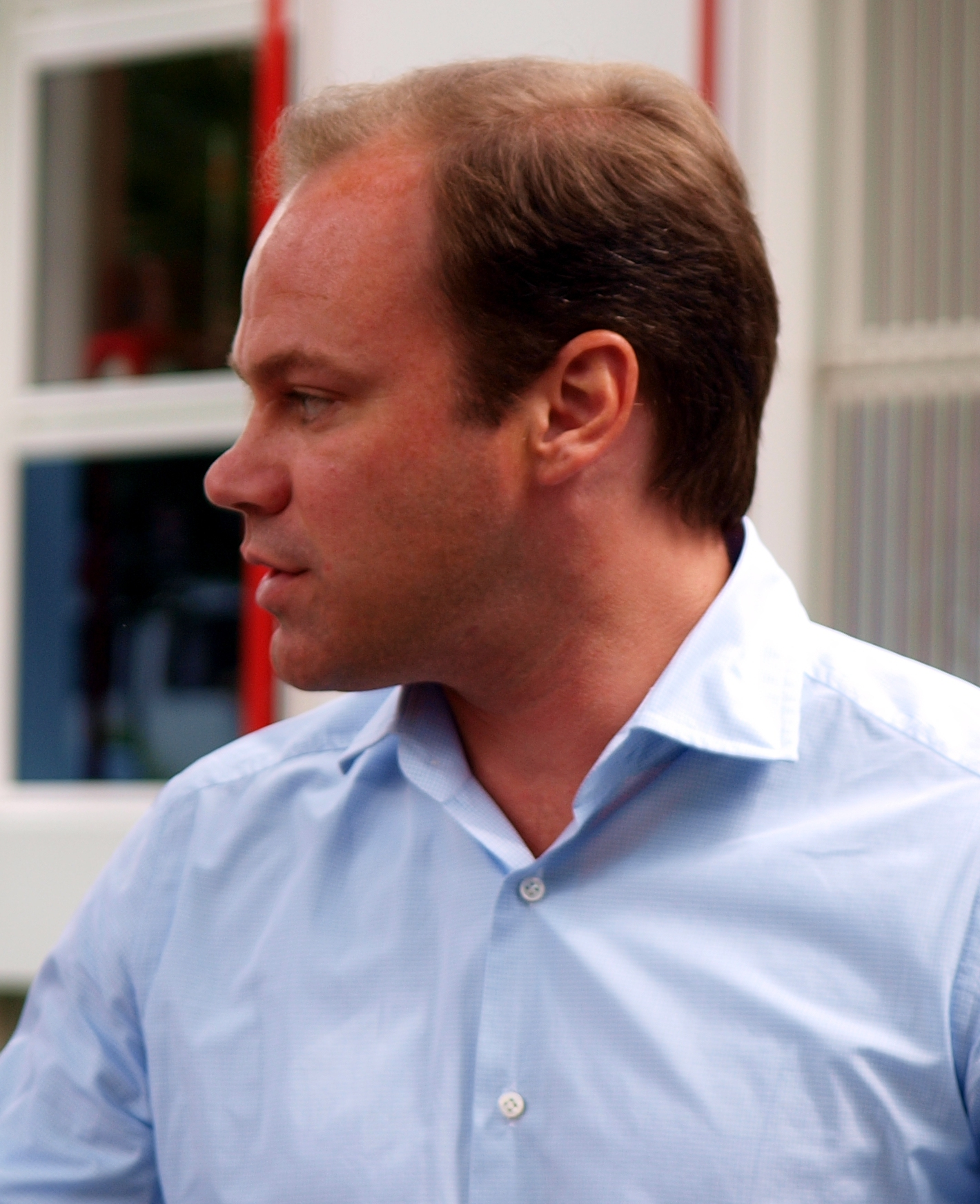
- Nerlinger in 2010

Personal information
- Date of birth: 21 March 1973 (age 53)
- Place of birth: Dortmund, West Germany
- Height: 1.82 m (6 ft 0 in)
- Position: Midfielder

Youth career
- 1981–1986: TSV Forstenried
- 1986–1992: Bayern Munich

Senior career*
Years	Team	Apps	(Gls)
1990–1993	Bayern Munich (A)	75	(18)
1992–1998	Bayern Munich	156	(27)
1998–2001	Borussia Dortmund	59	(2)
2001–2004	Rangers	25	(2)
2004–2006	1. FC Kaiserslautern	9	(0)
Total		324	(49)

International career
1992–1996	Germany U21	22	(10)
1998–1999	Germany	6	(1)
- * Club domestic league appearances and goals

Christian Nerlinger (born 21 March 1973) is a German former professional footballer who played as a central midfielder. His professional career was mainly associated with Bayern Munich and Borussia Dortmund.

== Club career ==
Nerlinger was born in Dortmund. He signed for FC Bayern Munich at the age of 13, completing his formation at the Bavarian side. He was promoted to the first team in 1992, but made no Bundesliga appearances in his debut season.

In the following campaign, Nerlinger's impact, in a midfield which also comprised Jorginho, Lothar Matthäus, Mehmet Scholl and Christian Ziege, was immediate, and he helped the eventual champions by finishing as the second top scorer in the squad with nine goals – a career-best in the German top-flight – only behind Scholl and Adolfo Valencia's 11; he made his competition debut on 7 August 1993, in a 3–1 home win against SC Freiburg.

After another four solid seasons, Nerlinger moved to hometown club Borussia Dortmund, where he began suffering with injuries; this situation would be worsened in the following years, as he could hardly get a game at any of his following two clubs, Scotland's Rangers and 1. FC Kaiserslautern (he reunited with former Bayern teammate Carsten Jancker in the latter), forcing to his retirement from the game in December 2005.

== International career ==
Nerlinger was capped six times by Germany, his debut coming on 5 September 1998, in a 1–1 friendly with Romania, in which he scored the equalizer five minutes from time. He did not attend, however, any major international tournament.

== Managerial career ==
After his professional career ended, Nerlinger studied International Business at the Munich Business School. Shortly later he was appointed team manager at Bayern Munich. In January 2010, he succeeded Uli Hoeneß as technical manager, upgrading shortly after to general manager of the club. On 2 July 2012, Nerlinger was replaced by Matthias Sammer.

Nerlinger became Team Manager on 1 July 2008. He became Sporting Director of Bayern Munich on 1 July 2009. He held the position until June 2012 when he was replaced by Matthias Sammer.

== Career statistics ==
Score and result list Germany's goal tally first, score column indicates score after Nerlinger goal.

International goal scored by Christian Nerlinger
No.	Date	Venue	Opponent	Score	Result	Competition
1	5 September 1998	Ta' Qali Stadium, Attard, Malta	Romania	1–1	1–1	Friendly

== Honours ==
Bayern Munich

- Bundesliga: 1993–94, 1996–97
- DFB-Pokal: 1997–98
- DFB Liga-Pokal: 1997
- UEFA Cup: 1995–96

Rangers

- Scottish Premier League: 2002–03
- Scottish Cup: 2001–02
