= Hartmut Strampe =

German football referee

- Born: 3 March 1956 (age 70); Handorf, West Germany

Domestic
Years	League	Role
1991–2003	Bundesliga	Referee

International
Years	League	Role
1993–2001	FIFA–listed	Referee

Hartmut Strampe (born 3 March 1956 in Handorf, West Germany) is a former German professional football referee. He was a full international for FIFA from 1993 until 2001. He refereed 1998 DFB-Pokal Final.
