= Ralf Kohl =

German footballer (born 1965)

Personal information
- Date of birth: 28 October 1965 (age 61)
- Place of birth: Weinheim, West Germany
- Height: 1.82 m (6 ft 0 in)
- Positions: Midfielder; defender

Youth career
- Amicitia Viernheim
- FC Ober-Abtsteinach

Senior career*
Years	Team	Apps	(Gls)
–1991	TSG Weinheim		
1991–2001	SC Freiburg	233	(15)
2001–2002	SC Freiburg II		
2002–2003	TSG Weinheim		
- * Club domestic league appearances and goals

Ralf Kohl (born 28 October 1965 in Weinheim, Baden-Württemberg) is a German former professional footballer who played as a midfielder or defender.
