= Marcel Witeczek =

German former professional footballer (born 1968)

Personal information
- Date of birth: 18 October 1968 (age 58)
- Place of birth: Tychy, Poland
- Height: 1.78 m (5 ft 10 in)
- Position: Attacking midfielder

Youth career
- 1980–1981: Oberhausen Rheinland
- 1981–1985: Rot-Weiß Oberhausen
- 1985–1986: Bayer Uerdingen

Senior career*
Years	Team	Apps	(Gls)
1986–1991	Bayer Uerdingen	142	(22)
1991–1993	1. FC Kaiserslautern	68	(15)
1993–1997	Bayern Munich	97	(9)
1997–2003	Borussia Mönchengladbach	167	(13)
2003–2005	SG Wattenscheid 09	62	(6)
2005–2007	FC Albstadt		
Total		536	(75)

International career
1984–1985	West Germany U16	9	(7)
1985	West Germany U17	6	(8)
1986	West Germany U19	1	(0)
1987	West Germany U20	8	(7)
1988–1990	West Germany U21	9	(4)
Medal record
Men's football
Representing West Germany
FIFA U-16 World Championship
Runner-up	1985 China
- * Club domestic league appearances and goals

Marcel Witeczek (born 18 October 1968) is a German former professional footballer who played mostly as an attacking midfielder.

Over the course of 15 seasons, he played in 410 Bundesliga games (50 goals; 474/59 counting both major levels of German football), representing four teams, including league powerhouse Bayern Munich, with whom he won his only titles.

== Playing career ==
Born in Tychy, Silesia, Poland, Witeczek moved to Germany aged 13 with his family. He was a successful youth player in his country of adoption, earning runners-up medals at both the 1985 FIFA U-16 World Championship and the 1987 World Youth Championship, winning the Golden Shoe at the latter tournament, with seven goals in as many games. However, he missed the decisive shootout penalty in the final against Yugoslavia, which West Germany lost.

At club level, Witeczek began his career with Bayer Uerdingen, making his first division debut on 8 August 1987, not yet 19, in a 2–0 win at FC Homburg. He moved on to 1. FC Kaiserslautern in 1991 and FC Bayern Munich two years later. With the Bavarians, he enjoyed his most successful period, appearing in 124 official matches over the course of four seasons, winning two league accolades and the 1995–96 UEFA Cup, to whose conquest he contributed with two goals, all against FC Barcelona in the semifinals (one in each leg, in a 4–3 aggregate qualification).

Aged almost 29, Witeczek signed for Borussia Mönchengladbach, suffering relegation in his second season but achieving promotion in his fourth, always as an important first-team member - never appeared in less than 30 league contests in that timeframe; after two slower years, he left for regional league side SG Wattenscheid 09, where he remained two further seasons.

After one year out of football, 37-year old Witeczek joined Landesliga (level 5) club FC Albstadt 07, retiring for good at the season's end.

== Honours ==
Bayern Munich

- Bundesliga: 1993–94, 1996–97
- UEFA Cup: 1995–96

Germany

- FIFA U-17 World Cup: Runner-up 1985
- FIFA U-20 World Cup: Runner-up 1987

Individual

- FIFA U-17 World Cup: Golden Shoe 1985
- FIFA U-20 World Cup: Golden Shoe 1987
