= Mehmet Scholl =

German footballer (born 1970)

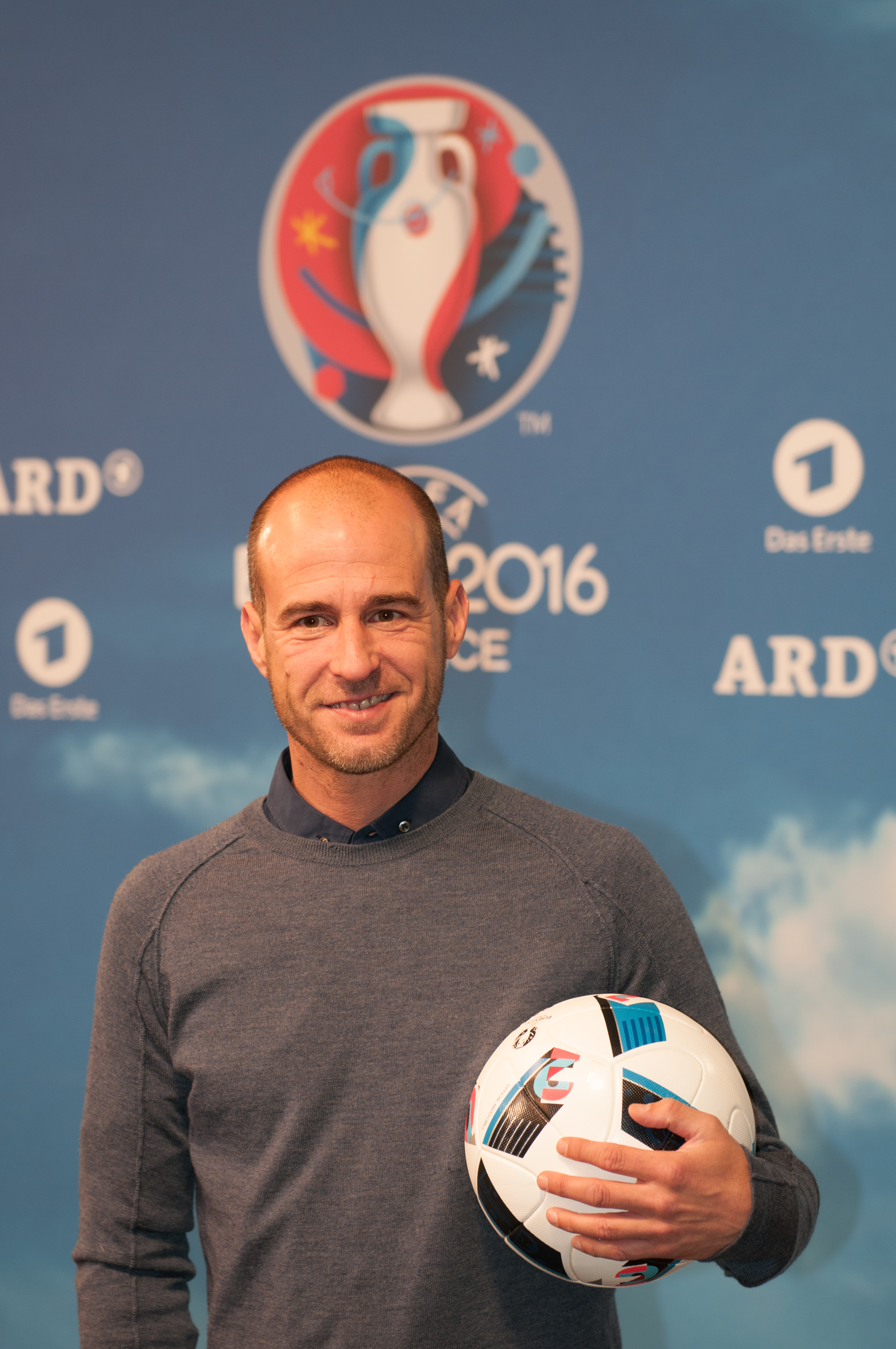
- Scholl in 2016

Personal information
- Full name: Mehmet Tobias Scholl
- Birth name: Mehmet Tobias Yüksel
- Date of birth: 16 October 1970 (age 56)
- Place of birth: Karlsruhe, West Germany
- Height: 1.77 m (5 ft 10 in)
- Position: Attacking midfielder

Youth career
- 1976–1982: SV Nordwest Karlsruhe
- 1982–1989: Karlsruher SC

Senior career*
Years	Team	Apps	(Gls)
1989–1991	Karlsruher SC (A)	28	(7)
1989–1992	Karlsruher SC	58	(11)
1992–2007	Bayern Munich	334	(87)
Total		420	(105)

International career
1991–1992	Germany U21	5	(3)
1992	Germany Olympic	1	(0)
1995–2002	Germany	36	(8)

Managerial career
- 2008–2009: Bayern Munich U13
- 2009–2010: Bayern Munich II
- 2012–2013: Bayern Munich II
Medal record
Bayern Munich
Winner	Bundesliga	1994
Runner-up	DFB-Supercup	1994
Winner	UEFA Cup	1996
Winner	Bundesliga	1997
Winner	DFB-Ligapokal	1997
Winner	DFB-Pokal	1998
Winner	DFB-Ligapokal	1998
Winner	Bundesliga	1999
Runner-up	DFB-Pokal	1999
Runner-up	UEFA Champions League	1999
Winner	DFB-Ligapokal	1999
Winner	Bundesliga	2000
Winner	DFB-Pokal	2000
Winner	DFB-Ligapokal	2000
Winner	Bundesliga	2001
Winner	UEFA Champions League	2001
Runner-up	UEFA Super Cup	2001
Winner	Intercontinental Cup	2001
Winner	Bundesliga	2003
Winner	DFB-Pokal	2003
Winner	DFB-Ligapokal	2004
Winner	Bundesliga	2005
Winner	DFB-Pokal	2005
Winner	Bundesliga	2006
Winner	DFB-Pokal	2006
Runner-up	DFB-Ligapokal	2006
Germany
Winner	European Championship	1996
- * Club domestic league appearances and goals

Mehmet Tobias Scholl (born Mehmet Tobias Yüksel; 16 October 1970) is a German football manager and former player.

He played most of his career as an attacking midfielder for Bayern Munich. During his career he won the UEFA Cup in 1996 (scoring a goal in each leg of the final), Euro 1996, and the UEFA Champions League in 2001, as well as eight German Championships (all with Bayern Munich). He retired at the end of the 2006–07 Bundesliga season as one of the most successful German football players of all time.

== Club career ==
Scholl played for SV Nordwest Karlsruhe (from 1976 to 1982) and Karlsruher SC (from 1982 to 1992) before joining Bayern Munich in July 1992. He stayed at Bayern for the rest of his career, wearing the number 7 shirt. Scholl retired from professional football after the 2006–07 season. In 15 seasons at Bayern he played in 468 competitive matches for Bayern, scoring 116 goals – 88 of these appearances were in European cup competitions (18 goals).

He was one of the Bundesliga's most successful players, winning the championship eight times. Aged 19, he made his Bundesliga debut on 21 April 1990, coming on for Karlsruher SC in the 78th minute of their away match against 1. FC Köln, and promptly scored his team's fifth goal in the 90th minute. He scored 98 goals (11 for Karlsruhe, 87 for Bayern) in 392 Bundesliga matches (58 for Karlsruhe, 334 for Bayern). Scholl has been praised for his technical ability, his creative playmaking, his dribbling skills, and his free kicks. In early 2001, he was voted Player of the Year 2000 by the professional players of the First and Second Bundesliga, and in May 2005, fans voted him one of the eleven greatest Bayern players of all time.

== International career ==
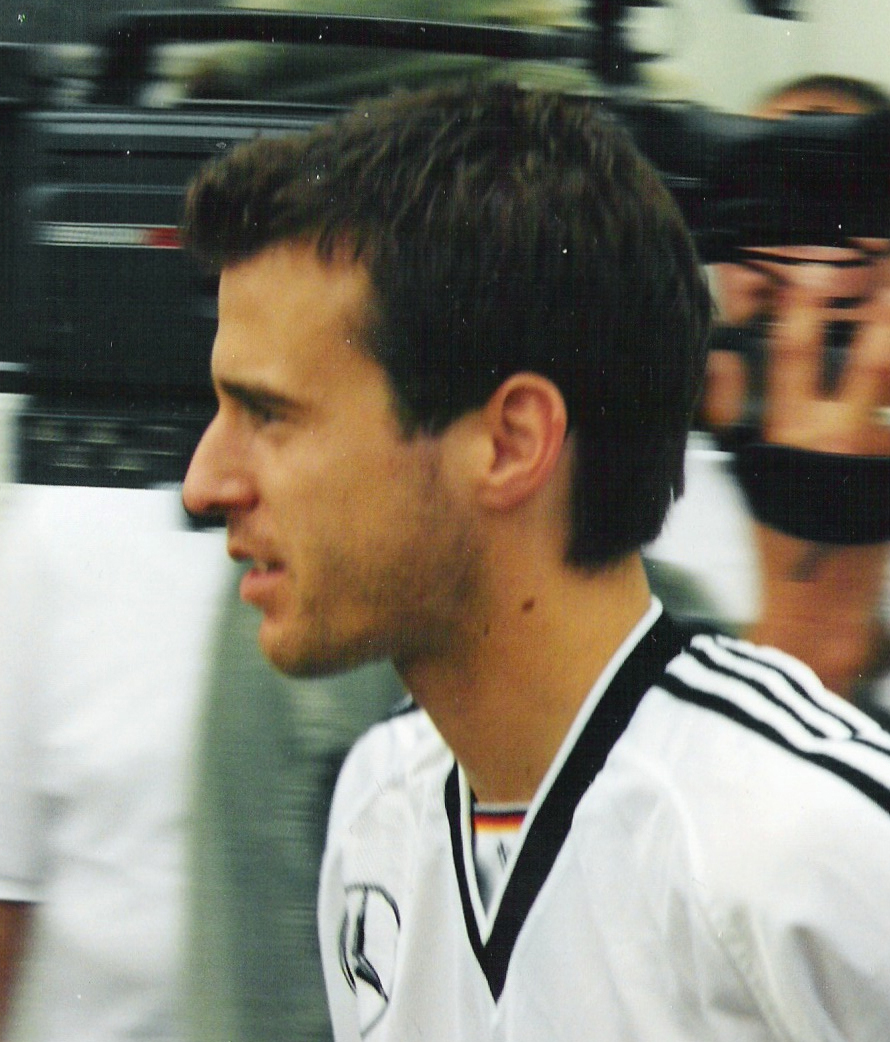
Scholl playing for Germany, c. 1999

Scholl played 36 matches for the German national team between 1995 and 2002, scoring eight goals. He was part of Germany's winning team at Euro 96 where he played in the quarterfinal, semifinal, and final. In the 69th minute of the final when the Czech Republic was leading 1–0, he was substituted for the then relatively unknown Oliver Bierhoff who went on to score the two goals that turned the match around for Germany, catapulting Bierhoff to national and international fame. Scholl also played in all three of Germany's games at Euro 2000, scoring Germany's only goal in the tournament against Romania.

Scholl repeatedly suffered injuries throughout his career, preventing him from maintaining a regular spot on the national team and eventually prompting him to retire from the national team prior to the 2002 FIFA World Cup, making him one of Germany's most successful players never to have played in a World Cup.

Among German football fans, Scholl was one of the most popular footballers because of his character and his unique skills. Before the 2006 World Cup Campaign, more than 100,000 people signed an online petition, "Mehmet für Deutschland", to persuade Jürgen Klinsmann to include Scholl in the German squad. Despite the public support, Scholl was not included.

=== International goals ===
Scores and results list Germany's goal tally first.

#	Date	Venue	Opponent	Score	Result	Competition
1.	29 May 1996	Windsor Park, Belfast	Northern Ireland	1–1	1–1	Friendly
2.	4 June 1999	BayArena, Leverkusen	Moldova	5–0	6–1	Euro 2000 qualifier
3.	14 November 1999	Ullevaal Stadion, Oslo	Norway	1–0	1–0	Friendly
4.	7 June 2000	Dreisamstadion, Freiburg	Liechtenstein	2–1	8–2	Friendly
5.	12 June 2000	Stade Maurice Dufrasne, Liège	Romania	1–1	1–1	Euro 2000
6.	16 August 2000	Niedersachsenstadion, Hanover	Spain	1–0	4–1	Friendly
7.	16 August 2000	Niedersachsenstadion, Hanover	Spain	2–0	4–1	Friendly
8.	15 November 2000	Parken Stadium, Copenhagen	Denmark	1–2	1–2	Friendly

== Coaching career ==
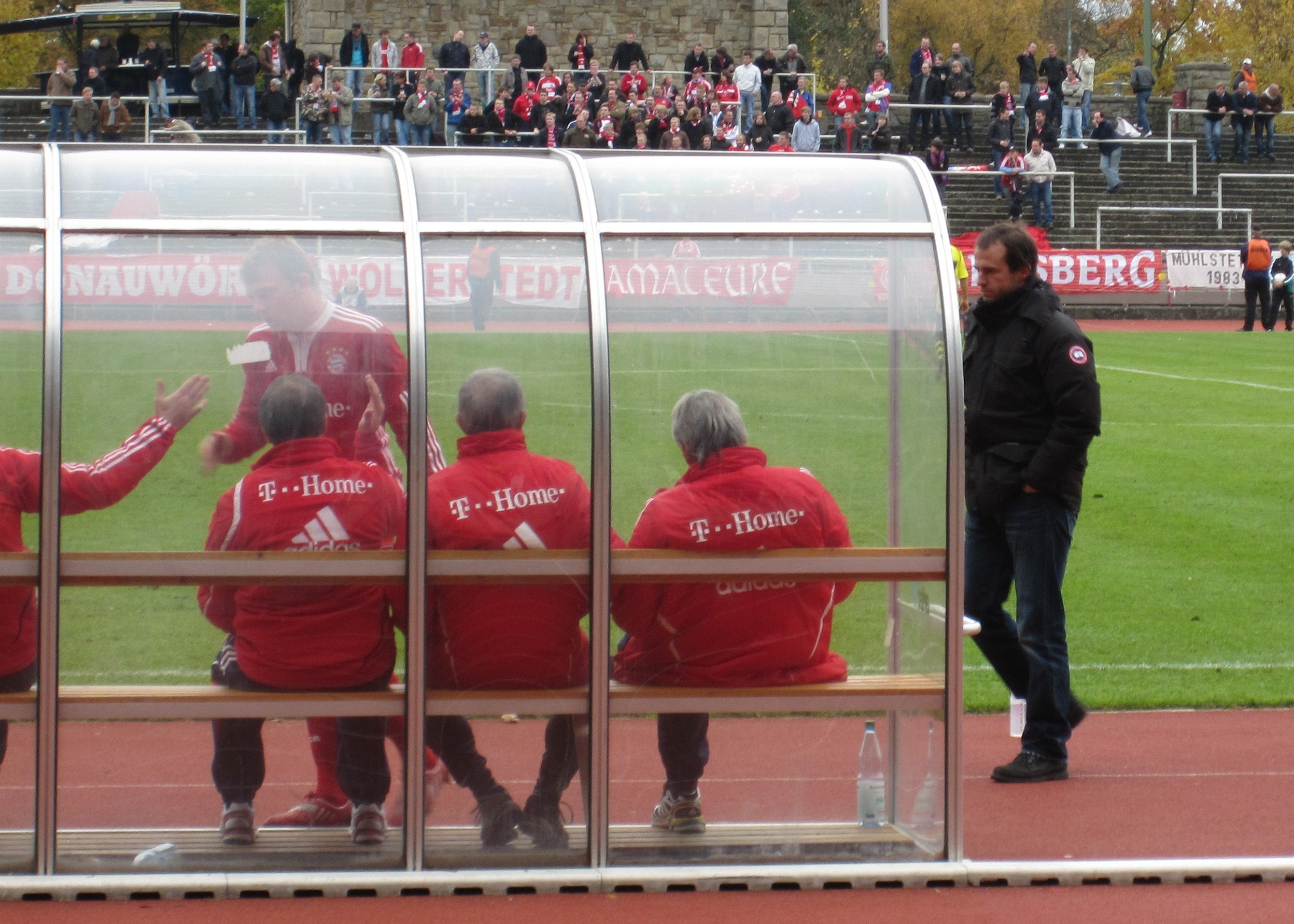
Scholl (right) coaching Bayern Munich II in 2009

On 27 April 2009, he was named as interim head coach for Bayern Munich II. He replaced Hermann Gerland who became assistant coach under Jupp Heynckes and continued to work as under-13 head coach. In July 2009 he was appointed as permanent manager of Bayern II and left the team on 30 June 2010 for a year, working on his coaching licence. Scholl returned to Bayern Munich II as head coach. In January 2013, Scholl announced that he would leave the team at the end of the 2012–13 season because he wanted to focus on his job as a TV pundit and that it conflicted with his work as coach.

== Personal life ==
Scholl was born in Karlsruhe, the second son of Ergin and Hella Yüksel, a Turkish father and a German mother. When he was five, his parents divorced, and his mother then married Hermann Scholl from whom Mehmet acquired his surname.

In May 2002 and October 2003, he released two successful mixtapes, featuring his favourite bands. The compilation's title "Mehmet Scholl kompiliert – Vor dem Spiel ist nach dem Spiel" is a reference to Sepp Herberger's famous expression "nach dem Spiel ist vor dem Spiel" ("after the game is before the game"). In an interview, Scholl said he chose this title because he listens to this music before the game, after the game, in the car on the way to the stadium, and in the car when leaving the stadium. The first volume includes songs by The Beta Band, Sportfreunde Stiller, Jimmy Eat World, and The Notwist (complete track list) among others. The second volume includes songs by Oasis, Wir sind Helden, and The Flaming Lips (complete track list) to name a few. Once a month, he co-presents the feature Mehmets Schollplatten in the program Nachtmix of the Bayern 2 radio station, which is the culturally oriented channel of the federal public broadcaster Bayerischer Rundfunk.

As a young player, Scholl was quoted with the words "hängt die Grünen, solange es noch Bäume gibt" ("hang the Greens while there still are trees"), seemingly expressing his dislike for the German Green Party. He was widely criticized for this quote because most people did not understand his point that here might be no trees left in the near future, thereby giving his statement an ironic touch. He was sued by a Green politician for instigation to murder, although this charge was later dropped and Scholl donated 15,000 DM to charity. When a journalist later asked Scholl which party he would vote for, Scholl answered "Grün natürlich, ich kann sie ja nicht hängenlassen" ("Greens, of course – I cannot leave them hanging, can I").

Scholl is officially without religious confession, but is an avid follower of Buddhist principles.

Since his retirement from football, he has taken up nine-pin bowling (Kegeln), a sport in which he already excelled as a youth.

== Career statistics ==
=== Club ===
Appearances and goals by club, season and competition
Club	Season	League			National Cup		League Cup		Europe		Total	
Club	Season	Division	Apps	Goals	Apps	Goals	Apps	Goals	Apps	Goals	Apps	Goals
Karlsruher SC	1989–90	Bundesliga	3	1	0	0	–		–		3	1
Karlsruher SC	1990–91	Bundesliga	27	6	1	0	–		–		28	6
Karlsruher SC	1991–92	Bundesliga	28	4	2	1	–		–		30	5
Karlsruher SC	Total		58	11	3	1	0	0	0	0	61	12
Bayern Munich	1992–93	Bundesliga	31	7	2	0	–		–		33	7
Bayern Munich	1993–94	Bundesliga	27	11	2	1	–		4	1	33	13
Bayern Munich	1994–95	Bundesliga	31	9	1	0	1	0	10	3	43	12
Bayern Munich	1995–96	Bundesliga	30	10	2	0	–		11	5	43	15
Bayern Munich	1996–97	Bundesliga	23	5	3	1	–		2	0	28	6
Bayern Munich	1997–98	Bundesliga	32	9	6	2	2	0	8	0	48	11
Bayern Munich	1998–99	Bundesliga	13	4	2	0	0	0	3	0	18	4
Bayern Munich	1999–2000	Bundesliga	25	6	3	1	2	0	12	3	42	10
Bayern Munich	2000–01	Bundesliga	29	9	1	1	2	1	16	5	48	16
Bayern Munich	2001–02	Bundesliga	18	6	3	1	0	0	2	0	23	7
Bayern Munich	2002–03	Bundesliga	18	4	4	0	1	0	4	0	27	4
Bayern Munich	2003–04	Bundesliga	5	0	2	1	1	0	1	0	9	1
Bayern Munich	2004–05	Bundesliga	20	3	2	1	0	0	5	1	27	5
Bayern Munich	2005–06	Bundesliga	18	3	3	2	0	0	6	0	27	5
Bayern Munich	2006–07	Bundesliga	14	1	1	0	1	0	4	0	20	1
Bayern Munich	Total		334	87	37	11	10	1	88	18	469	117
Career total			392	98	40	12	10	1	88	18	530	129

=== International ===
Country	Season	Competitive		Friendlies		Total		Ref
Country	Season	Apps	Goals	Apps	Goals	Apps	Goals	Ref
Germany
Germany	1994–95	2	0	1	0	3	0	
Germany	1995–96	3	0	6	1	9	1	
Germany	1996–97	2	0	1	0	3	0	
Germany	1997–98	—		—		—		
Germany	1998–99	6	1	0	0	6	1	
Germany	1999–2000	3	1	5	2	8	3	
Germany	2000–01	3	0	3	3	6	3	
Germany	2001–02	—		1	0	1	0	
Career total		19	2	17	6	36	8	

=== Managerial statistics ===
As of 24 May 2013

Team	From	To	Record							
Team	From	To	G	W	D	L	GF	GA	GD	Win %
Bayern Munich II	27 April 2009	30 June 2010	41	8	10	23	35	61	−26	19.51
Bayern Munich II	1 July 2012	30 June 2013	38	21	10	7	71	31	+40	55.26
Totals			79	29	20	30	106	92	+14	36.71

== Honours ==
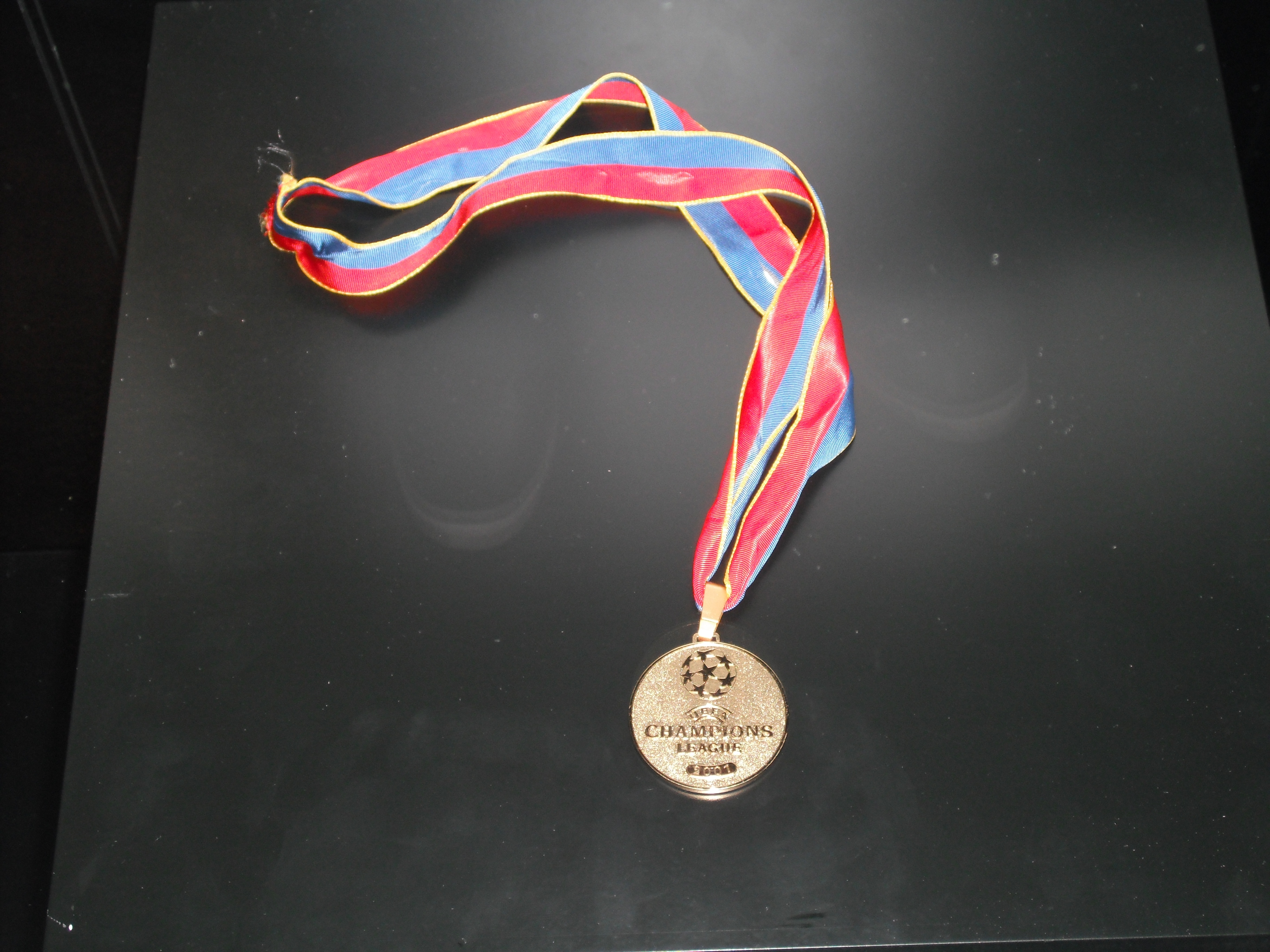
Scholl's winner's medal from the 2000–01 UEFA Champions League, in the Bayern Munich museum.

Bayern Munich

- Bundesliga: 1993–94, 1996–97, 1998–99, 1999–2000, 2000–01, 2002–03, 2004–05, 2005–06
- DFB-Pokal: 1997–98, 1999–2000, 2002–03, 2004–05, 2005–06
- DFB-Ligapokal: 1997, 1998, 1999, 2000, 2004
- UEFA Champions League: 2000–01
- UEFA Cup: 1995–96
- Intercontinental Cup: 2001

Germany

- UEFA European Championship: 1996

Individual

- Bravo Otto: 1996, 1997, 2000
- ESM Team of the Year: 1995–96, 2000–01
- kicker Bundesliga Team of the Season: 1997–98, 2000–01
- Goal of the Month (Germany): January 2000, December 2000, February 2003
- VDV Bundesliga Player of the Year: 2000
- Bayern Munich All-time XI: 2005
