= Marco Grimm =

German footballer (born 1972)

Personal information
- Date of birth: 16 June 1972 (age 54)
- Place of birth: Baden-Baden, West Germany
- Height: 1.86 m (6 ft 1 in)
- Position: Defender

Team information
- Current team: Werder Bremen II (assistant coach)

Youth career
- 1978–1988: SV Kuppenheim
- 1988–1992: FV Hörden

Senior career*
Years	Team	Apps	(Gls)
1992–1993	VfB Gaggenau	12	(0)
1993–1995	Bayern Munich II	44	(1)
1994–1995	Bayern Munich	1	(0)
1995–1998	VfB Stuttgart	32	(0)
1998–1999	Grazer AK	26	(2)
1999–2003	Karlsruher SC	76	(2)
2003–2007	Eintracht Braunschweig	117	(2)
2007–2009	1. FC Kaiserslautern II	26	(0)
Total		334	(7)

Managerial career
- 2007–2015: 1. FC Kaiserslautern II (assistant)
- 2015–2016: 1. FC Kaiserslautern (assistant)
- 2017–2019: FC Wil (assistant)
- 2020–: Werder Bremen II (assistant)
- * Club domestic league appearances and goals

Marco Grimm (born 16 June 1972) is a German former professional footballer played as a defender. He spent four seasons in the Bundesliga with Bayern Munich and VfB Stuttgart, as well as five seasons in the 2. Bundesliga with Karlsruher SC and Eintracht Braunschweig. He also played for one season in the Austrian Bundesliga, with Grazer AK.

== Career ==
Grimm was born in Baden-Baden. He began his career with VfB Gaggenau, before joining Bayern Munich in 1993, as a reserve team player. He made his debut for the first-team in April 1995, as a substitute for Thomas Helmer in the UEFA Champions League semi-final against Ajax. His one Bundesliga appearance for the club came ten days later – again replacing Helmer in a match against Eintracht Frankfurt which Bayern won 5–2, but was awarded to Frankfurt as Grimm was one of four reserve players used by Bayern, more than the maximum of three.

In 1995, Grimm joined VfB Stuttgart, where he made 21 Bundesliga appearances in his first season, mostly as a substitute. He made eleven league appearances the following year, plus four on the way to a DFB-Pokal win, although he didn't play in the final. He didn't play at all during the 1997–98 season, and in July 1998 signed for Austrian side Grazer AK, managed by former Bayern Munich coach Klaus Augenthaler.

Grimm had a fairly successful season in Austria, as GAK finished third in the league, before he returned to Germany in 1999, to sign for Karlsruher SC of the 2. Bundesliga. Karlsruhe were relegated in Grimm's first season, but he helped them win the Regionalliga Süd title and return to the second tier at the first attempt, where he played for a further two seasons before leaving the club in 2003.

Grimm then signed for Eintracht Braunschweig of the Regionalliga Nord, helping them win the title in his second season. He stayed with the club for two years in the 2. Bundesliga, the latter of which saw the club relegated in last place. In July 2007, he signed for 1. FC Kaiserslautern II, where he played for two seasons before becoming the team's assistant manager.

== Honours ==
VfB Stuttgart

- UEFA Cup Winners' Cup runner-up: 1997–98
- DFB-Pokal: 1996–97
