= Sven Scheuer =

German footballer (born 1971)

Personal information
- Full name: Sven Toni Scheuer
- Date of birth: 19 January 1971 (age 55)
- Place of birth: Böblingen, Baden-Württemberg, West Germany
- Height: 1.87 m (6 ft 2 in)
- Position: Goalkeeper

Youth career
- –1988: SV Böblingen

Senior career*
Years	Team	Apps	(Gls)
1988–1999	Bayern Munich	20	(0)
2000–2001	Adanaspor	17	(0)
2001–2002	1. FC Saarbrücken	6	(0)
2003	Grazer AK	5	(0)
2003	VfL Osnabrück	8	(0)
2004–2005	TSV Schönaich	11	(0)
Total		67	(0)

International career
1990	Germany U-21	1	(0)
- * Club domestic league appearances and goals

Sven Scheuer (born 19 January 1971) is a German former professional footballer who played as a goalkeeper.

== Club career ==
Scheuer was born in Böblingen. He joined FC Bayern Munich in 1988, and spent 11 years with the club, serving as backup goalkeeper to Raimond Aumann until 1994 and later Oliver Kahn. He usually shared this role with another 'keeper, including Uwe Gospodarek (1991–1994), Michael Probst (1994–1996) and Bernd Dreher (1996–1999). He made 20 appearances in the Bundesliga, half of which came in the 1994–95 season, and won five league titles, plus the UEFA Cup in 1996 and the DFB Pokal in 1998. He also played regularly for Bayern's reserve team, in the Oberliga Bayern and Regionalliga Süd.

After leaving Bayern, Scheuer embarked on a fairly nomadic career, playing for Adanaspor in Turkey, Grazer AK in Austria, and 1. FC Saarbrücken and VfL Osnabrück back home. He also had a six month trial at Crystal Palace in 2002.

== International career ==
Scheuer played one match for the Germany under-21 national team, a 3–0 win over Luxembourg in October 1990.

== Honours ==
Bayern Munich

- Bundesliga: 1988–89, 1989–90, 1993–94, 1996–97, 1998–99
- UEFA Cup: 1995–96
- DFB-Pokal: 1997–98
- UEFA Champions League: runner-up 1998–99
- DFB-Ligapokal: 1997, 1998
