= Markus Reiter =

German football manager and former player

Personal information
- Date of birth: 10 August 1976 (age 50)
- Place of birth: Essen, West Germany
- Height: 1.87 m (6 ft 2 in)
- Position: Defender

Youth career
- –1993: Schwarz-Weiß Essen

Senior career*
Years	Team	Apps	(Gls)
1993–1998	MSV Duisburg	50	(0)
1998–2000	Borussia Mönchengladbach	14	(0)
2000–2001	Greuther Fürth	14	(0)
Total		78	(0)

International career
	Germany U17	5	(0)
	Germany U18	6	(1)
1996–1998	Germany U21	14	(0)

Managerial career
- 2009–2011: MSV Duisburg II
- 2012: SC Wiedenbrück 2000
- 2013–2014: MSV Duisburg (assistant)
- 2015: Rot-Weiss Essen
- * Club domestic league appearances and goals

Markus Reiter (born 10 August 1976) is a German football manager and former player. Before his career as coach, Reiter played as a defender for MSV Duisburg, Borussia Mönchengladbach and SpVgg Greuther Fürth in the Bundesliga and 2. Bundesliga. He retired as a player in 2001, at the age of 25.

== Honours ==
MSV Duisburg

- DFB-Pokal: runner-up 1997–98
