= Dieter Frey =

German footballer

Personal information
- Date of birth: 31 October 1972 (age 54)
- Place of birth: Bogen, West Germany
- Height: 1.86 m (6 ft 1 in)
- Positions: Defender; midfielder

Youth career
- 1979–1985: TSV Wiggensbach
- 1985–1988: FC Kempten
- 1988–1992: FC Augsburg

Senior career*
Years	Team	Apps	(Gls)
1992–1996	Bayern Munich	47	(3)
1996–1997	SC Freiburg	21	(1)
1997–2001	Werder Bremen	30	(3)
2001–2004	1. FC Nürnberg	30	(1)
Total		128	(8)

International career
1993	Germany U-21	5	(0)
- * Club domestic league appearances and goals

Dieter Frey (born 31 October 1972) is a German former professional footballer who played as a defender or midfielder.

== Career ==
Frey began his professional career with Bayern Munich, making his debut against VfB Leipzig in the 1993–94 season. He never established himself as a first-team regular, however, and left in 1996 to join SC Freiburg. After one year at Freiburg he moved to Werder Bremen, but injuries restricted him to just 30 appearances in four seasons. In 2001, he returned south, joining 1. FC Nürnberg, where he briefly served as captain, but his injury troubles returned, and he retired in 2004 after the club's relegation to the 2. Bundesliga.

== Personal life ==
After his retirement from playing Frey studied at university and became a mathematics teacher.

== Honours ==
Bayern Munich

- Bundesliga: 1993–94
- UEFA Cup: 1995–96

Werder Bremen

- DFB-Pokal: 1998–99; runner-up 1999–2000
- UEFA Intertoto Cup: 1998

1. FC Nürnberg

- 2. Bundesliga: 2003–04
