= 1996–97 Bundesliga =

34th season of the Bundesliga

Bundesliga
- Season: 1996–97
- Dates: 16 August 1996 – 31 May 1997
- Champions: Bayern Munich; 13th Bundesliga title 14th German title
- Relegated: Düsseldorf; Freiburg; St. Pauli
- Champions League: Bayern Munich; Bayer Leverkusen; Borussia Dortmund (title holders)
- Cup Winners' Cup: VfB Stuttgart
- UEFA Cup: VfL Bochum; Karlsruher SC; 1860 Munich; Schalke 04 (title holders)
- Intertoto Cup: Werder Bremen; MSV Duisburg; 1. FC Köln; Hamburger SV
- Matches: 306
- Goals: 886 (2.9 per match)
- Top goalscorer: Ulf Kirsten (22)
- Biggest home win: Bochum 6–0 St. Pauli (24 May 1997)
- Biggest away win: seven games with a differential of +4 each (1–5 once, 4–0 six times)
- Highest scoring: M'gladbach 6–2 Bochum (8 goals) (17 May 1997); Leverkusen 5–3 Freiburg (8 goals) (22 September 1996); St. Pauli 4–4 Schalke (8 goals) (23 August 1996)

The 1996–97 Bundesliga was the 34th season of the Bundesliga, Germany's premier football league. It began on 16 August 1996 and ended on 31 May 1997. Borussia Dortmund were the defending champions.

== Competition format ==
Every team played two games against each other team, one at home and one away. Teams received three points for a win and one point for a draw. If two or more teams were tied on points, places were determined by goal difference and, if still tied, by goals scored. The team with the most points were crowned champions while the three teams with the fewest points were relegated to 2. Bundesliga.

== Team changes to 1995–96 ==
1. FC Kaiserslautern, Eintracht Frankfurt and KFC Uerdingen 05 were relegated to the 2. Bundesliga after finishing in the last three places. They were replaced by VfL Bochum, Arminia Bielefeld and MSV Duisburg.

== Team overview ==
Location of teams in Bundesliga 1996–97

Club	Location	Ground	Capacity
Arminia Bielefeld	Bielefeld	Stadion Alm	22,512
VfL Bochum	Bochum	Ruhrstadion	36,344
SV Werder Bremen	Bremen	Weserstadion	36,000
Borussia Dortmund	Dortmund	Westfalenstadion	55,000
MSV Duisburg	Duisburg	Wedaustadion	30,128
Fortuna Düsseldorf	Düsseldorf	Rheinstadion	55,850
SC Freiburg	Freiburg	Dreisamstadion	22,500
Hamburger SV	Hamburg	Volksparkstadion	62,000
Karlsruher SC	Karlsruhe	Wildparkstadion	33,800
1. FC Köln	Cologne	Müngersdorfer Stadion	55,000
Bayer 04 Leverkusen	Leverkusen	BayArena	22,500
Borussia Mönchengladbach	Mönchengladbach	Bökelbergstadion	34,500
TSV 1860 Munich	Munich	Olympiastadion	63,000
FC Bayern Munich	Munich	Olympiastadion	63,000
FC Hansa Rostock	Rostock	Ostseestadion	25,850
FC Schalke 04	Gelsenkirchen	Parkstadion	70,000
FC St. Pauli	Hamburg	Stadion am Millerntor	20,550
VfB Stuttgart	Stuttgart	Gottlieb-Daimler-Stadion	53,700

== League table ==
Pos	Team	Pld	W	D	L	GF	GA	GD	Pts	Qualification or relegation
1	Bayern Munich (C)	34	20	11	3	68	34	+34	71	Qualification to Champions League group stage (Note: Borussia Dortmund and Schalke 04 won their respective European competitions in this season, so they qualified as title holders. As a consequence, the original UEFA Cup places of Dortmund and Stuttgart, who qualified for the UEFA Cup Winners' Cup as domestic cup winners, were awarded to Karlsruhe and 1860 Munich; the Intertoto Cup berths of Karlsruhe and 1860 were handed to Köln and Hamburg, as Mönchengladbach did not apply for this competition.)
2	Bayer Leverkusen	34	21	6	7	69	41	+28	69	Qualification to Champions League second qualifying round
3	Borussia Dortmund	34	19	6	9	63	41	+22	63	Qualification to Champions League group stage
4	VfB Stuttgart	34	18	7	9	78	40	+38	61	Qualification to Cup Winners' Cup first round
5	VfL Bochum	34	14	11	9	54	51	+3	53	Qualification to UEFA Cup first round
6	Karlsruher SC	34	13	10	11	55	44	+11	49	Qualification to UEFA Cup first round
7	1860 Munich	34	13	10	11	56	56	0	49	Qualification to UEFA Cup first round
8	Werder Bremen	34	14	6	14	53	52	+1	48	Qualification to Intertoto Cup group stage
9	MSV Duisburg	34	12	9	13	44	49	−5	45	Qualification to Intertoto Cup group stage
10	1. FC Köln	34	13	5	16	62	62	0	44	Qualification to Intertoto Cup group stage
11	Borussia Mönchengladbach	34	12	7	15	46	48	−2	43	
12	Schalke 04	34	11	10	13	35	40	−5	43	Qualification to UEFA Cup first round
13	Hamburger SV	34	10	11	13	46	60	−14	41	Qualification to Intertoto Cup group stage
14	Arminia Bielefeld	34	11	7	16	46	54	−8	40	
15	Hansa Rostock	34	11	7	16	35	46	−11	40	
16	Fortuna Düsseldorf (R)	34	9	6	19	26	57	−31	33	Relegation to 2. Bundesliga
17	SC Freiburg (R)	34	8	5	21	43	67	−24	29	Relegation to 2. Bundesliga
18	FC St. Pauli (R)	34	7	6	21	32	69	−37	27	Relegation to 2. Bundesliga

Source: www.dfb.de
Rules for classification: 1) points; 2) goal difference; 3) number of goals scored.
(C) Champions; (R) Relegated

== Results ==
Home \ Away	DSC	BOC	SVW	BVB	DUI	F95	SCF	HSV	KSC	KOE	B04	BMG	M60	FCB	ROS	S04	STP	VFB
Arminia Bielefeld	—	3–1	3–1	2–0	1–1	1–0	2–0	1–1	1–2	1–4	0–1	0–2	2–3	2–0	1–3	0–1	1–2	2–0
VfL Bochum	1–1	—	3–2	1–0	1–0	3–1	3–2	3–1	3–1	2–2	2–2	2–0	2–2	1–1	1–0	0–1	6–0	2–1
Werder Bremen	2–1	5–1	—	0–4	0–2	1–0	1–0	0–0	1–0	3–2	1–1	1–0	1–1	3–0	1–1	3–0	2–1	2–2
Borussia Dortmund	5–0	2–0	2–1	—	2–0	4–0	3–1	1–1	1–1	2–1	3–1	1–3	4–1	1–1	3–0	1–0	2–1	1–1
MSV Duisburg	0–0	1–1	3–2	3–2	—	0–0	1–4	1–1	2–2	3–0	1–3	4–2	2–3	0–4	0–1	0–1	1–0	3–1
Fortuna Düsseldorf	1–2	2–2	4–1	2–0	1–1	—	2–1	1–1	0–3	0–3	0–0	1–0	0–0	0–2	0–2	1–3	2–0	0–4
SC Freiburg	2–1	0–1	3–2	1–2	2–0	1–2	—	0–4	1–1	1–3	1–2	1–0	2–2	0–0	1–0	2–3	4–0	1–1
Hamburger SV	2–2	2–2	3–2	2–1	1–1	2–1	5–1	—	2–0	0–4	0–2	2–1	2–3	0–3	1–1	1–0	3–0	0–4
Karlsruher SC	5–2	2–3	1–3	1–1	1–0	2–0	3–0	3–1	—	4–1	1–1	1–1	3–0	0–2	1–1	0–0	4–0	0–2
1. FC Köln	2–5	2–0	4–1	1–3	2–5	2–0	1–0	2–2	4–1	—	4–0	4–0	1–0	2–4	0–2	3–1	0–1	1–5
Bayer Leverkusen	1–0	2–0	2–1	4–2	1–0	0–1	5–3	5–0	3–1	4–2	—	3–0	3–0	5–2	4–1	2–0	3–0	0–0
Borussia Mönchengladbach	0–0	6–2	4–1	5–1	0–1	2–0	4–3	3–0	1–3	2–1	2–2	—	1–0	2–2	2–0	0–0	0–0	0–1
1860 Munich	1–3	0–1	0–3	1–3	1–1	3–0	4–0	2–1	1–1	2–1	3–0	3–0	—	3–3	2–0	2–1	4–2	2–5
Bayern Munich	1–0	1–1	1–0	0–0	5–2	5–0	0–0	2–1	1–0	3–2	4–2	1–0	1–1	—	2–1	3–0	3–0	4–2
Hansa Rostock	3–1	0–0	0–1	0–1	0–1	3–1	3–1	0–1	2–2	0–0	1–0	1–0	2–4	0–3	—	0–1	3–1	2–2
Schalke 04	0–0	1–1	1–1	1–3	4–0	0–1	0–2	2–0	0–1	1–1	1–2	0–0	4–1	1–1	2–0	—	0–0	1–0
FC St. Pauli	2–3	2–1	0–3	0–1	0–2	3–0	2–0	2–2	2–4	0–0	3–1	1–3	0–0	1–2	0–1	4–4	—	2–1
VfB Stuttgart	4–2	3–1	2–1	4–1	0–2	0–2	4–2	4–1	1–0	4–0	1–2	5–0	1–1	1–1	5–1	4–0	3–0	—

Source: DFB
Legend: Blue = home team win; Yellow = draw; Red = away team win.

== Top goalscorers ==
22 goals

- (Germany) Ulf Kirsten (Bayer 04 Leverkusen)

21 goals

- (Austria) Toni Polster (1. FC Köln)

19 goals

- (Germany) Fredi Bobic (VfB Stuttgart)

17 goals

- (Germany) Sean Dundee (Karlsruher SC)
- (Brazil) Giovane Élber (VfB Stuttgart)
- (Brazil) Paulo Sérgio (Bayer 04 Leverkusen)
- (Germany) Bernhard Winkler (TSV 1860 Munich)

15 goals

- (Austria) Andreas Herzog (SV Werder Bremen)
- (Germany) Jürgen Klinsmann (FC Bayern Munich)

14 goals

- (Nigeria) Jonathan Akpoborie (FC Hansa Rostock)
- (Germany) Stefan Kuntz (Arminia Bielefeld)

== Attendances ==
No.	Team	Attendance	Change	Highest
1	Bayern München	58,059	-2.4%	69,000
2	Borussia Dortmund	53,082	20.7%	55,000
3	VfB Stuttgart	42,500	36.3%	53,000
4	Schalke 04	39,122	2.1%	71,021
5	TSV 1860	38,765	9.2%	69,000
6	1. FC Köln	31,088	-5.5%	52,000
7	Werder Bremen	30,553	9.6%	36,200
8	Borussia Mönchengladbach	30,152	-3.5%	35,500
9	Hamburger SV	29,746	6.4%	57,590
10	VfL Bochum	28,404	82.4%	36,344
11	Karlsruher SC	27,096	1.1%	33,515
12	FC St. Pauli	23,342	6.2%	45,957
13	SC Freiburg	22,394	-0.5%	22,500
14	Fortuna 95	21,265	-15.2%	53,000
15	Arminia Bielefeld	21,185	58.7%	22,512
16	Bayer Leverkusen	20,729	-6.0%	23,000
17	MSV Duisburg	19,417	68.2%	30,500
18	Hansa Rostock	18,971	-29.3%	24,200

== See also ==
- 1996–97 2. Bundesliga
- 1996–97 DFB-Pokal
