= 1997–98 DFB-Pokal =

Tournament details
- Country: Germany
- Teams: 64

Final positions
- Champions: Bayern Munich
- Runners-up: MSV Duisburg

Tournament statistics
- Matches played: 63
- Top goal scorer: Carsten Jancker (6)

The 1997–98 DFB-Pokal was the 55th season of the annual German football cup competition. 64 teams competed in the tournament of six rounds which began on 14 August 1997 and ended on 16 May 1998. In the final Bayern Munich defeated MSV Duisburg 2–1 thereby claiming their ninth title.

== Matches ==
Times up to 25 October 1997 and from 29 March 1998 are CEST (UTC+2). Times from 26 October 1997 to 28 March 1998 are CET (UTC+1).

=== First round ===
14 August 1997	FSV Zwickau	0 – 1	Schalke 04	Zwickau
		Report (in German)	Wilmots 20'	Stadium: Westsachsenstadion; Attendance: 9,600; Referee: Winfried Buchhart (Schrobenhausen)

14 August 1997	Chemnitzer FC	1 – 3	Karlsruher SC	Chemnitz
	Osmanović 40' (pen.)	Report (in German)	Reich 21', 80'; Wück 60'	Stadium: Stadion an der Gellertstraße; Attendance: 7,000; Referee: Florian Meyer (Braunschweig)

14 August 1997	SV Warnemünde	0 – 8	Borussia Dortmund	Warnemünde
		Report (in German)	Möller 8', 12'; Chapuisat 20'; Herrlich 41', 88'; Ricken 62'; Kree 67'; But 69'	Attendance: 6,200; Referee: Augur (Berlin)

14 August 1997	Rot-Weiss Oberhausen	0 – 2	Werder Bremen	Oberhausen
		Report (in German)	Van Lent 29'; Labbadia 63'	Stadium: Niederrheinstadion; Attendance: 8,000; Referee: Helmut Fleischer (Ulm)

14 August 1997	VfB Leipzig	2 – 1	FC Gütersloh	Leipzig
	Fuchs 24'; Däbritz 90'	Report (in German)	Flock 76'	Stadium: Bruno-Plache-Stadion; Attendance: 2,500; Referee: Lange (Herrenberg)

14 August 1997	Carl Zeiss Jena	1 – 1 (a.e.t.) (4–2 p)	FC St. Pauli	Jena
	Holetschek 47'	Report (in German)	Trulsen 42'	Stadium: Ernst-Abbe-Sportfeld; Attendance: 3,400; Referee: Frank Gettke (Haltern)
	Penalties
	Schneider (penalty missed); Weber (penalty scored); Holetschek (penalty scored); Rusyayev (penalty scored); Lindner (penalty scored)		Pröpper (penalty missed); Seeliger (penalty scored); Trulsen (penalty scored); Dammann (penalty missed)

14 August 1997	Waldhof Mannheim	2 – 2 (a.e.t.) (4–3 p)	SG Wattenscheid 09	Mannheim
	Sawieh 82'; Birlik 89'	Report (in German)	Feinbier 45'; Süs 72'	Attendance: 5,000; Referee: Günther Frey (Neu-Ulm)
	Penalties
	Protzel (penalty scored); Marić (penalty scored); Birlik (penalty scored); Pasieka (penalty scored)		Majek (penalty scored); Allievi (penalty scored); Hasecke (penalty missed); Feinbier (penalty scored); Skok (penalty missed)

15 August 1997	SSV Ulm 1846	3 – 1	1. FC Köln	Ulm
	Widmayer 3'; Trkulja 7' (pen.), 33'	Report (in German)	Rösele 16'	Stadium: Donaustadion; Attendance: 11,000; Referee: Joachim Neis (Theley)

15 August 1997	DJK Waldberg	1 – 16	Bayern Munich	Nuremberg
	Haase 16'	Report (in German)	Giovane Élber 12', 18', 22'; Scholl 13'; Jancker 32', 36', 43', 45', 47'; Basler 37'; Hamann 39', 50'; Fink 55'; Strunz 57'; Helmer 60'; Rizzitelli 74'	Attendance: 35,500; Referee: Volker Wezel (Tübingen)

15 August 1997	Rot-Weiss Essen	1 – 2	MSV Duisburg	Essen
	Cyroń 15'	Report (in German)	Wohlert 40'; Komljenović 42'	Stadium: Georg-Melches-Stadion; Attendance: 11,000; Referee: Weiner (Ottenstein)

15 August 1997	Hamburger SV (A)	2 – 3	VfL Bochum	Hamburg
	Reincke 25'; Poskus 72'	Report (in German)	Kracht 19'; Stickroth 51' (pen.); Wosz 74'	Stadium: Edmund-Plambeck-Stadion; Attendance: 1,200; Referee: Carsten Kadach (Suderberg)

15 August 1997	Borussia Mönchengladbach (A)	0 – 1	VfB Stuttgart	Mönchengladbach
		Report (in German)	Bobic 18'	Stadium: Grenzlandstadion; Attendance: 5,300; Referee: Wolfgang Friedrichs (Lennestadt)

15 August 1997	TSV Pansdorf 1920	1 – 4	Energie Cottbus	Pansdorf
	Blank 66'	Report (in German)	Hoßmang 59'; Irrgang 72'; Konetzke 81'; Wawrzyczek 85'	Attendance: 1,200; Referee: Matthias Anklam (Buchholz, Nordheide)

15 August 1997	1. FC Saarbrücken	1 – 0	SC Freiburg	Saarbrücken
	Zibert 74'	Report (in German)		Stadium: Ludwigsparkstadion; Attendance: 5,200; Referee: Salver (Stuttgart)

15 August 1997	Alemannia Aachen	0 – 0 (a.e.t.) (4–3 p)	1. FC Nürnberg	Aachen
		Report (in German)		Stadium: Tivoli; Attendance: 12,000; Referee: Schütz (Bölsberg)
	Penalties
	Bluhm (penalty scored); Scheinhardt (penalty scored); Lasser (penalty scored); Thiele (penalty missed); Krohm (penalty scored)		Richter (penalty scored); Ziemer (penalty scored); Driller (penalty missed); Wiesinger (penalty scored); Knäbel (penalty missed)

15 August 1997	VfR Mannheim	6 – 2	Fortuna Köln	Mannheim
	Dakić 6', 68'; Hohmann 43'; Lutz 47', 85'; Karamehmedović 70' (pen.)	Report (in German)	Schmitt 11'; Krieg 73'	Stadium: Rhein-Neckar Stadion; Attendance: 1,5000; Referee: Herbert Fandel (Kyllburg)

15 August 1997	Hannover 96	1 – 1 (a.e.t.) (5–3 p)	Borussia Mönchengladbach	Hannover
	Rasiejewski 56'	Report (in German)	Juskowiak 4'	Stadium: Eilenriedestadion; Attendance: 33,400; Referee: Sippel (Würzburg)
	Penalties
	Bicici (penalty scored); Ernst (penalty scored); Fischer (penalty scored); Dietrich (penalty scored); Milovanović (penalty scored)		Lupescu (penalty scored); Wynhoff (penalty scored); Schneider (penalty missed); Ketelaer (penalty scored)

16 August 1997	Hansa Rostock	0 – 2	Bayer Leverkusen	Rostock
		Report (in German)	N. Kovač 62'; Kirsten 77'	Stadium: Ostseestadion; Attendance: 5,000; Referee: Uwe Kemmling (Kleinburgwedel)

16 August 1997	Wacker Nordhausen	1 – 3	Hamburger SV	Nordhausen
	Kiel 75' (pen.)	Report (in German)	Böger 8'; Salihamidžić 80'; Uysal 81'	Attendance: 7,000; Referee: Frank Kiefer (Baunatal)

16 August 1997	1. FC Kaiserslautern (A)	0 – 5	1. FC Kaiserslautern	Kaiserslautern
		Report (in German)	Marschall 17'; Rische 31'; Kuka 73', 81'; Ratinho 78'	Attendance: 11,000; Referee: Kammerer (Karlsruhe)

16 August 1997	Werder Bremen (A)	2 – 3 (a.e.t.)	VfL Wolfsburg	Bremen
	Mbassa-Koné 62'; Seidel 109'	Report (in German)	Achilles 47' (o.g.); Dammeier 102' (pen.); Tyszkiewicz 115'	Stadium: Weserstadion, Platz 11; Attendance: 2,100; Referee: Carsten Byernetzki (Hamburg)

16 August 1997	TuS Celle	0 – 2	1860 Munich	Celle
		Report (in German)	Abedi Pele 52'; Winkler 63'	Stadium: Günther-Volke-Stadion; Attendance: 5,600; Referee: Christian Schößling (Leipzig)

16 August 1997	SSV Reutlingen	0 – 3	Arminia Bielefeld	Reutlingen
		Report (in German)	Breitkreutz 18', 50'; Meißner 90'	Stadium: Stadion an der Kreuzeiche; Attendance: 7,000; Referee: Christian Wack (Gersheim)

16 August 1997	Reinickendorfer Füchse	0 – 2	SV Meppen	Berlin
		Report (in German)	Stendel 25'; Helmer 58'	Attendance: 900; Referee: Sather (Grimma)

16 August 1997	VfB Lübeck	2 – 1	Fortuna Düsseldorf	Lübeck
	Behnert 63' (pen.); Schwerinski 74'	Report (in German)	Dražić 5'	Stadium: Lohmühle Stadion; Attendance: 4,700; Referee: Torsten Koop (Lüttenmark)

16 August 1997	FC Singen 04	0 – 2	SpVgg Greuther Fürth	Singen
		Report (in German)	Skarabela 69'; Kerbr 79'	Attendance: 2,900; Referee: Roland Schäfer (Frankenthal)

16 August 1997	Preußen Münster	2 – 2 (a.e.t.) (6–7 p)	Mainz 05	Münster
	Serr 32' (pen.); Jedlicka 61'	Report (in German)	Demandt 19'; Klopp 50'	Stadium: Preußenstadion; Attendance: 4,000; Referee: Bernd Hauer (Celle)
	Penalties
	Gockel (penalty scored); Sumelka (penalty scored); Serr (penalty scored); Antwerpen (penalty scored); Böcker (penalty scored); Gruszka (penalty scored); Kusmin (penalty missed)		Hayer (penalty scored); Schmidt (penalty scored); Spyrka (penalty scored); Sohler (penalty scored); Demandt (penalty scored); Klopp (penalty scored); Wache (penalty scored)

16 August 1997	SC Neukirchen	0 – 2	KFC Uerdingen	Neukirchen
		Report (in German)	Grauer 38'; Wollitz 83'	Attendance: 1,500; Referee: Thorsten Kinhöfer (Herne)

16 August 1997	VfL Halle 96	0 – 4	Eintracht Frankfurt	Halle
		Report (in German)	Janßen 24'; Güntensperger 34' (pen.); Sobotzik 47' (pen.), 70'	Attendance: 4,500; Referee: Wendel (Gransee)

16 August 1997	Eintracht Trier	2 – 1	SpVgg Unterhaching	Trier
	Heinzen 43'; Bennij 83'	Report (in German)	Oberleitner 80'	Stadium: Moselstadion; Attendance: 4,100; Referee: Dirk Margenberg (Wermelskirchen)

16 August 1997	VfB Oldenburg	2 – 4	Stuttgarter Kickers	Oldenburg
	Hennig 26' (pen.); Janiak 71'	Report (in German)	Beierle 2', 12', 52'; Sailer 89'	Stadium: Marschweg-Stadion; Attendance: 2,100; Referee: Peter Gagelmann (Bremen)

16 August 1997	EFC Stahl	0 – 4	Hertha BSC	Eisenhüttenstadt
		Report (in German)	Sverrisson 5'; F. Bartz 54' (o.g.); Mazingu-Dnzey 80'; Mandreko 85'	Stadium: Stadion der Hüttenwerker; Attendance: 5,300; Referee: Müller (Dresden)

=== Second round ===
23 September 1997	Eintracht Trier	1 – 0	Schalke 04	Trier
	Thömmes 76'	Report (in German)		Stadium: Moselstadion; Attendance: 16,000; Referee: Lange (Herrenberg)

23 September 1997	Waldhof Mannheim	4 – 3	Energie Cottbus	Mannheim
	Pasieka 24'; Santos 50'; Protzel 55' (pen.); Berchtold 66'	Report (in German)	Lehmann 1'; Kronhardt 41', 56'	Attendance: 5,100; Referee: Wagner (Hofheim)

23 September 1997	Eintracht Frankfurt	3 – 0	Werder Bremen	Frankfurt
	Sobotzik 18' (pen.); Janßen 38'; Weber 63'	Report (in German)		Stadium: Waldstadion; Attendance: 33,000; Referee: Hebert Fandel (Kyllburg)

23 September 1997	Alemannia Aachen	2 – 1 (a.e.t.)	VfB Leipzig	Aachen
	Lochen 27'; Krohm 109'	Report (in German)	Heidrich 45'	Stadium: Old Tivoli; Attendance: 15,000; Referee: Alfons Berg (Konz)

23 September 1997	MSV Duisburg	1 – 0	VfL Bochum	Duisburg
	Hirsch 31'	Report (in German)		Stadium: Wedaustadion; Attendance: 11,900; Referee: Müller (Dresden)

23 September 1997	VfL Wolfsburg	3 – 3 (a.e.t.) (3–4 p)	Bayern Munich	Wolfsburg
	Reyna 7' (pen.); Kovačević 44'; Präger 88'	Report (in German)	Giovane Élber 45'; Zickler 77'; Tarnat 85'	Attendance: 15,500; Referee: Hellmut Krug (Gelsenkirchen)
	Penalties
	Dammeier (penalty scored); Spies (penalty scored); Reyna (penalty missed); Präger (penalty missed); Tyskiewicz (penalty scored)		Strunz (penalty missed); Scholl (penalty scored); Nerlinger (penalty scored); Lizarazu (penalty scored); Tarnat (penalty scored)

23 September 1997	Karlsruher SC	2 – 2 (a.e.t.) (2–4 p)	Arminia Bielefeld	Karlsruhe
	Schroth 28'; Häßler 45' (pen.)	Report (in German)	Kuntz 9'; Meißner 86'	Stadium: Wildparkstadion; Attendance: 10,500; Referee: Edgar Steinborn (Sinzig)
	Penalties
	Metz (penalty scored); Gilewicz (penalty missed); Kolinger (penalty scored); Schepens (penalty missed)		Breitkreutz (penalty missed); Stratos (penalty scored); Meißner (penalty scored); Fuchs (penalty scored); Kuntz (penalty scored)

23 September 1997	VfR Mannheim	1 – 1 (a.e.t.) (3–4 p)	Carl Zeiss Jena	Mannheim
	Karamehmedović 3'	Report (in German)	Cramer 11'	Stadium: Rhein-Neckar-Stadion; Attendance: 1,000; Referee: Hermann Albrecht (Kaufbeuren)
	Penalties
	Fellhauer (penalty scored); Scherdel (penalty scored); Karamehmedović (penalty missed); Schächter (penalty scored); Perfetto (penalty missed)		Schneider (penalty scored); Pfitzner (penalty scored); Rusyayev (penalty scored); Holetschek (penalty missed); Weber (penalty scored)

24 September 1997	SSV Ulm 1846	4 – 1	Mainz 05	Ulm
	Bódog 17'; Trkulja 56'; Fritz 73'; Buterin 79'	Report (in German)	Ouakili 65'	Stadium: Donaustadion; Attendance: 5,000; Referee: Ralf Hilmes (Nordhorn)

24 September 1997	SV Meppen	4 – 1	Stuttgarter Kickers	Meppen
	Stendel 32'; Myyry 54'; Von Ahlen 60' (pen.); Helmer 73' (pen.)	Report (in German)	Marić 32'	Stadium: Emslandstadion; Attendance: 5,400; Referee: Jürgen Aust (Cologne)

24 September 1997	SpVgg Greuther Fürth	2 – 4	Borussia Dortmund	Nuremberg
	Probst 2'; Dürr 67' (pen.)	Report (in German)	Möller 40'; Sousa 44'; Ricken 53', 90'	Attendance: 30,500; Referee: Bernd Heynemann (Magdeburg)

24 September 1997	1. FC Saarbrücken	0 – 4	1. FC Kaiserslautern	Saarbrücken
		Report (in German)	Marschall 2'; Trautmann 7' (o.g.); Reich 52'; Rische 61'	Stadium: Ludwigsparkstadion; Attendance: 33,000; Referee: Hans-Jürgen Weber (Essen)

24 September 1997	Bayer Leverkusen	2 – 1 (a.e.t.)	Hamburger SV	Leverkusen
	Feldhoff 50'; Beinlich 105'	Report (in German)	Dembinski 89'	Attendance: 21,000; Referee: Helmut Fleischer (Ulm)

24 September 1997	Hannover 96	2 – 1	1860 Munich	Hannover
	Bicici 11' (pen.); Addo 49'	Report (in German)	Jeremies 37'	Attendance: 36,000; Referee: Jansen (Dormagen)

24 September 1997	VfB Stuttgart	2 – 0	Hertha BSC	Stuttgart
	Čović 26' (o.g.); Balakov 67' (pen.)	Report (in German)		Stadium: Gottlieb-Daimler-Stadion; Attendance: 16,000; Referee: Uwe Kemmling (Kleinburgwedel)

25 September 1997	VfB Lübeck	1 – 4	KFC Uerdingen	Lübeck
	Policella 21'	Report (in German)	Onderka 18'; Müller 29'; Nacev 45'; Spizak 82'	Stadium: Lohmühle Stadion; Attendance: 5,800; Referee: Burkhard Hufgard (Mömbris)

=== Round of 16 ===
28 October 1997	Eintracht Trier	2 – 1	Borussia Dortmund	Trier
	Thömmes 37'; Czakon 50' (pen.)	Report (in German)	Kohler 53'	Stadium: Moselstadion; Attendance: 17,900; Referee: Lutz-Michael Frohlich (Berlin)

28 October 1997	1. FC Kaiserslautern	1 – 2	Bayern Munich	Kaiserslautern
	Sforza 25'	Report (in German)	Nerlinger 3'; Jancker 75'	Stadium: Betzenberg; Attendance: 38,000; Referee: Jürgen Jansen (Essen)

2 December 1997	MSV Duisburg	1 – 0	Eintracht Frankfurt	Duisburg
	Salou 83'	Report (in German)		Stadium: Wedaustadion; Attendance: 9,200; Referee: Hartmut Strampe (Handorf)

2 December 1997	SSV Ulm 1846	1 – 3	VfB Stuttgart	Ulm
	Trkulja 4'	Report (in German)	Akpoborie 54'; Bobic 56'; Balakov 76' (pen.)	Stadium: Donaustadion; Attendance: 25,100; Referee: Herbert Fandel (Kyllburg)

2 December 1997	Hannover 96	1 – 1 (a.e.t.) (2–4 p)	Carl Zeiss Jena	Hannover
	Reinhardt 90'	Report (in German)	Weber 72'	Attendance: 18,700; Referee: Franz-Xaver Wack (Biberbach)
	Penalties
	Rasiejewski (penalty missed); Ernst (penalty missed); Fischer (penalty scored); Linke (penalty scored)		Schneider (penalty missed); Tomas (penalty scored); Lindner (penalty scored); Weber (penalty scored); Jüptner (penalty scored)

3 December 1997	Bayer Leverkusen	1 – 1 (a.e.t.) (4–3 p)	Arminia Bielefeld	Leverkusen
	Kirsten 28'	Report (in German)	Reeb 72'	Attendance: 18,000; Referee: Alfons Berg (Konz)
	Penalties
	Beinlich (penalty scored); Heintze (penalty scored); Feldhoff (penalty scored); Rink (penalty scored)		Breitkreutz (penalty scored); Meißner (penalty missed); Fuchs (penalty scored); Ivanović (penalty scored); Koch (penalty missed)

3 December 1997	SV Meppen	0 – 2	KFC Uerdingen	Meppen
		Report (in German)	Wollitz 12'; Nikolić 90'	Stadium: Emslandstadion; Attendance: 6,000; Referee: Bernhard Zerr (Ottersweier)

3 December 1997	Alemannia Aachen	1 – 1 (a.e.t.) (4–5 p)	Waldhof Mannheim	Aachen
	Ibrahim 15'	Report (in German)	Koch 90'	Stadium: Tivoli; Attendance: 18,000; Referee: Markus Merk (Otterbach)
	Penalties
	Bluhm (penalty scored); Lasser (penalty scored); Scheinhardt (penalty scored); Heeren (penalty scored); Krohm (penalty missed); Hoffmann (penalty missed)		Birlik (penalty scored); Koch (penalty missed); Hoop (penalty scored); Pasieka (penalty scored); Santos (penalty scored); Mba (penalty scored)

=== Quarter-finals ===
16 December 1997	KFC Uerdingen	0 – 4	VfB Stuttgart	Krefeld
		Report (in German)	Akpoborie 19'; Bobic 52', 53'; Hagner 90'	Stadium: Grotenburg-Stadion; Attendance: 8,800; Referee: Lutz Michael Frohlich (Berlin)

16 December 1997	Carl Zeiss Jena	1 – 2	MSV Duisburg	Jena
	Gerstner 78' (pen.)	Report (in German)	Osthoff 24', 74'	Stadium: Ernst-Abbe-Sportfeld; Attendance: 4,600; Referee: Winfried Buchhart (Schrobenhausen)

16 December 1997	Eintracht Trier	1 – 0	Waldhof Mannheim	Trier
	Fengler 48'	Report (in German)		Stadium: Moselstadion; Attendance: 6,000; Referee: Uwe Kemmling (Kleinburgwedel)

17 December 1997	Bayern Munich	2 – 0	Bayer Leverkusen	Munich
	Nerlinger 42'; Giovane Élber 74'	Report (in German)		Stadium: Olympiastadion; Attendance: 12,000; Referee: Edgar Steinborn (Sinzig)

=== Semi-finals ===
17 February 1998	Bayern Munich	3 – 0	VfB Stuttgart	Munich
	Hamann 14'; Scholl 21'; Tarnat 25'	Report (in German)		Stadium: Olympiastadion; Attendance: 32,000; Referee: Herbert Fandel (Kyllburg)

18 February 1998	Eintracht Trier	1 – 1 (a.e.t.) (9–10 p)	MSV Duisburg	Trier
	Fengler 89'	Report (in German)	Zeyer 51'	Stadium: Moselstadion; Attendance: 16,500; Referee: Hermann Albrecht (Kaufbeuren)
	Penalties
	Fengler (penalty missed); Muchka (penalty scored); Smirnov (penalty scored); Richter (penalty scored); Milošević (penalty scored); Bennij (penalty scored); Teichmann (penalty scored); Heinzen (penalty scored); Thömmes (penalty scored); Melunović (penalty scored); Ischdonat (penalty missed)		Zeyer (penalty scored); Popovici (penalty scored); Neun (penalty scored); Skoog (penalty scored); Wohlert (penalty missed); Wolters (penalty scored); Komljenović (penalty scored); Hirsch (penalty scored); Puschmann (penalty scored); Emmerling (penalty scored); Gill (penalty scored)

=== Final ===
16 May 1998
19:30 CEST

Bayern Munich	2–1	MSV Duisburg
Babbel 70'; Basler 89'	Report	Salou 20'

Olympiastadion, Berlin
Attendance: 75,800
Referee: Hartmut Strampe (Handorf)
