= 1995–96 Regionalliga =

2nd season of the Regionalliga as a third-level league

Regionalliga
- Season: 1995–96
- Champions: VfB Oldenburg (N); Tennis Borussia Berlin (NO); FC Gütersloh (W/SW); Stuttgarter Kickers (S)
- Promoted: VfB Oldenburg; FC Gütersloh; Stuttgarter Kickers; Rot-Weiß Essen
- Relegated: VfL 93 Hamburg; BV Cloppenburg; Holstein Kiel; Bischofswerdaer FV; Hertha BSC (A); FSV Optik Rathenow; 1. FC Kaiserslautern (A); SG Wattenscheid 09 (A); Borussia Neunkirchen; Bonner SC; SV Sandhausen; Eintracht Frankfurt (A)
- Amateur Championship: Tennis Borussia Berlin; VfR Mannheim; FC Homburg; VfR Mannheim
- Matches played: 1,260
- Goals scored: 3,620 (2.87 per match)
- Top goalscorer: Dragan Trkulja (SSV Ulm 1846) - 25

The 1995–96 Regionalliga was the second season of the Regionalliga as the third tier of German football. The league was organised in four regional divisions, Nord, Nordost, West-Südwest and Süd.

VfB Oldenburg, FC Gütersloh, Rot-Weiß Essen and Stuttgarter Kickers were promoted to the 2. Bundesliga while the three last placed in each division, except West/South-West, where it was the bottom four, were relegated to the Oberligas.

== Regionalliga Nord ==
=== Final table ===
Pos	Team	Pld	W	D	L	GF	GA	GD	Pts	Qualification or relegation
1	VfB Oldenburg (C, P)	34	20	7	7	56	36	+20	67	Qualification to promotion play-off
2	Eintracht Braunschweig	34	18	6	10	63	35	+28	60	
3	TuS Celle FC	34	16	11	7	63	40	+23	59	
4	Kickers Emden	34	18	5	11	61	49	+12	59	
5	VfL Osnabrück	34	13	13	8	52	42	+10	52	
6	Hamburger SV II	34	12	13	9	45	42	+3	49	
7	FC St. Pauli II	34	13	9	12	54	58	−4	48	
8	Lüneburger SK	34	11	11	12	52	46	+6	44	
9	VfL Herzlake	34	11	11	12	39	44	−5	44	
10	SV Wilhelmshaven	34	11	10	13	40	40	0	43	
11	SV Lurup	34	11	9	14	42	49	−7	42	
12	Concordia Hamburg	34	11	8	15	38	46	−8	41	
13	1. SC Norderstedt	34	11	8	15	37	51	−14	41	
14	SV Atlas Delmenhorst	34	8	14	12	42	51	−9	38	
15	Werder Bremen II	34	7	15	12	37	44	−7	36	
16	VfL 93 Hamburg (R)	34	9	9	16	39	51	−12	36	Relegation to Oberliga
17	BV Cloppenburg (R)	34	9	9	16	44	61	−17	36	Relegation to Oberliga
18	Holstein Kiel (R)	34	9	8	17	34	53	−19	35	Relegation to Oberliga

(C) Champions; (P) Promoted; (R) Relegated

=== Top scorers ===
#	Player	Club	Goals
1.	(Turkey) Hakan Cengiz	Atlas Delmenhorst	21
2.	(Germany) Matthias Cordes	Lüneburger SK	19
3.	(Brazil) Leonardo Manzi	FC St. Pauli (A)	17
4.	(Germany) Stephan Prause	Kickers Emden	15
5.	(Turkey) Özkan Koçtürk	Eintracht Braunschweig	14
6.	(Turkey) Hakan Biçici	TuS Celle	13
6.	(Germany) Rainer Menzel	Holstein Kiel	13
8.	(Germany) Ralf Balzis	VfL Osnabrück	12
8.	(Germany) Olaf Blancke	BV Cloppenburg	12
8.	(Germany) Jürgen Degen	VfL 93 Hamburg	12
8.	(Federal Republic of Yugoslavia) Vladan Milovanović	TuS Celle	12

== Regionalliga Nordost ==
=== Final table ===
Pos	Team	Pld	W	D	L	GF	GA	GD	Pts	Qualification or relegation
1	Tennis Borussia Berlin (C)	34	25	4	5	72	25	+47	79	Qualification to promotion play-off
2	1. FC Union Berlin	34	21	9	4	72	23	+49	72	
3	FC Energie Cottbus	34	21	8	5	67	23	+44	71	
4	Dynamo Dresden	34	19	10	5	46	23	+23	67	
5	FC Erzgebirge Aue	34	16	9	9	52	35	+17	57	
6	FC Sachsen Leipzig	34	14	8	12	50	45	+5	50	
7	Rot-Weiß Erfurt	34	13	11	10	31	26	+5	50	
8	FSV Lok Altmark Stendal	34	13	5	16	32	47	−15	44	
9	Reinickendorfer Füchse	34	11	10	13	36	33	+3	43	
10	Spandauer SV	34	11	8	15	36	52	−16	41	
11	Wacker Nordhausen	34	8	16	10	35	37	−2	40	
12	Hertha Zehlendorf	34	9	12	13	31	47	−16	39	
13	FC Berlin	34	9	8	17	44	68	−24	35	
14	FC Stahl Eisenhüttenstadt	34	9	8	17	43	68	−25	35	
15	FSV Velten	34	9	6	19	46	80	−34	33	
16	Bischofswerdaer FV 08 (R)	34	6	14	14	24	41	−17	32	Relegation to Oberliga
17	Hertha BSC II (R)	34	8	6	20	46	61	−15	30	Relegation to Oberliga
18	FSV Optik Rathenow (R)	34	4	8	22	20	49	−29	20	Relegation to Oberliga

(C) Champions; (R) Relegated

=== Top scorers ===
#	Player	Club	Goals
1.	(Germany) Detlef Irrgang	Energie Cottbus	24
2.	(Russia) Mikhail Rusyayev	Tennis Borussia Berlin	21
3.	(Bosnia and Herzegovina) Sergej Barbarez	1. FC Union Berlin	17
4.	(Poland) Jacek Frackiewicz	1. FC Union Berlin	16
5.	(Albania) Harun Isa	Tennis Borussia Berlin	15
5.	(Bosnia and Herzegovina) Igor Lazić	Dynamo Dresden	15
7.	(Ukraine) Oleg Golowan	FC Sachsen Leipzig	14
8.	(Poland) Marek Czakon	1. FC Union Berlin	13
8.	(Germany) Mayk Goschin	FSV Velten	13
10.	(Germany) Bernd Jopek	Spandauer SV	12
10.	(Germany) Stephan Kuhlow	Reinickendorfer Füchse; Hertha Zehlendorf	12
10.	(Russia) Mikhail Pronichev	FC Berlin	12
10.	(Germany) Jan Schmidt	Erzgebirge Aue	12

== Regionalliga West/Südwest ==
=== Final table ===
Pos	Team	Pld	W	D	L	GF	GA	GD	Pts	Promotion or relegation
1	FC Gütersloh (C, P)	36	23	8	5	80	36	+44	77	Promotion to 2. Bundesliga
2	Rot-Weiß Essen	36	21	8	7	60	31	+29	71	Promotion to 2. Bundesliga
3	FC Homburg	36	20	7	9	69	37	+32	67	
4	Wuppertaler SV	36	20	5	11	57	42	+15	65	
5	TuS Paderborn-Neuhaus	36	17	11	8	68	47	+21	62	
6	Alemannia Aachen	36	17	9	10	65	53	+12	60	
7	1. FC Saarbrücken	36	16	7	13	64	48	+16	55	
8	Rot-Weiß Oberhausen	36	14	12	10	42	33	+9	54	
9	Preußen Münster	36	13	12	11	59	49	+10	51	
10	SC Verl	36	13	10	13	56	55	+1	49	
11	SpVgg Erkenschwick	36	11	13	12	42	40	+2	46	
12	1. FC Bocholt	36	11	10	15	50	63	−13	43	
13	FSV Salmrohr	36	9	13	14	43	52	−9	40	
14	SC Hauenstein	36	8	14	14	36	47	−11	38	
15	Eintracht Trier	36	9	11	16	38	53	−15	38	
16	1. FC Kaiserslautern II (R)	36	8	12	16	50	82	−32	36	Relegation to Oberliga
17	SG Wattenscheid 09 II (R)	36	9	7	20	47	69	−22	34	Relegation to Oberliga
18	Borussia Neunkirchen (R)	36	5	9	22	30	69	−39	24	Relegation to Oberliga
19	Bonner SC (R)	36	4	10	22	27	77	−50	22	Relegation to Oberliga

(C) Champions; (P) Promoted; (R) Relegated

=== Top scorers ===
#	Player	Club	Goals
1.	(Germany) Dirk van der Ven	FC Gütersloh	21
2.	(Germany) Marcus Feinbier	Alemannia Aachen	20
3.	(Togo) Jacques Goumai	FC Homburg	17
4.	(Germany) Jürgen Serr	Preußen Münster	16
5.	(Germany) Frank Holick	TuS Paderborn-Neuhaus	15
5.	(Germany) Wolfram Klein	Rot-Weiß Essen	15
7.	(Germany) Dieter Hecking	TuS Paderborn-Neuhaus	14
7.	(Germany) Frank Scharf	1. FC Bocholt	14
9.	(Germany) Gustav Policella	Eintracht Trier	12
9.	(Germany) Achim Weber	Wuppertaler SV	12

== Süd ==
=== Final table ===
Pos	Team	Pld	W	D	L	GF	GA	GD	Pts	Promotion or relegation
1	Stuttgarter Kickers (C, P)	34	21	10	3	82	33	+49	73	Promotion to 2. Bundesliga
2	VfR Mannheim	34	18	10	6	71	41	+30	64	
3	SSV Ulm 1846	34	16	12	6	56	40	+16	60	
4	SSV Reutlingen	34	17	7	10	55	39	+16	58	
5	TSF Ditzingen	34	15	8	11	67	51	+16	53	
6	TSV Vestenbergsgreuth	34	13	13	8	44	36	+8	52	
7	SpVgg 07 Ludwigsburg	34	14	10	10	58	55	+3	52	
8	SpVgg Fürth	34	15	6	13	60	60	0	51	
9	Wacker Burghausen	34	11	16	7	51	35	+16	49	
10	Hessen Kassel	34	12	8	14	44	57	−13	44	
11	FC Augsburg	34	11	8	15	42	47	−5	41	
12	SC Neukirchen	34	10	9	15	44	53	−9	39	
13	Bayern Munich II	34	9	11	14	34	47	−13	38	
14	SG Egelsbach	34	10	8	16	44	64	−20	38	
15	SV Darmstadt 98	34	8	13	13	54	67	−13	37	
16	SV Sandhausen (R)	34	8	10	16	42	59	−17	34	Relegation to Oberliga
17	Eintracht Frankfurt II (R)	34	6	12	16	33	61	−28	30	Relegation to Oberliga
18	FSV Frankfurt (R)	34	3	7	24	29	65	−36	16	Relegation to Oberliga

(C) Champions; (P) Promoted; (R) Relegated

=== Top scorers ===
#	Player	Club	Goals
1.	(Federal Republic of Yugoslavia) Dragan Trkulja	SSV Ulm 1846	25
2.	(Germany) Markus Beierle	Stuttgarter Kickers	23
3.	(Federal Republic of Yugoslavia) Željko Dakić	VfR Mannheim	20
4.	(Germany) Frank Türr	SpVgg Fürth	18
5.	(Germany) Andreas Broß	TSF Ditzingen	16
6.	(Croatia) Marko Barlecaj	TSF Ditzingen; Wacker Burghausen	15
7.	(Germany) Hans-Peter Asbeck	Wacker Burghausen	14
7.	(Germany) Carsten Lakies	SV Darmstadt 98	14
9.	(Bosnia and Herzegovina) Branko Granić	SpVgg Ludwigsburg	13
9.	(Germany) Marcus Sorg	TSF Ditzingen	13

== Promotion playoff ==
The last promotion place was contested between the champions of the North and North-East regions. VfB Oldenburg won on aggregate, and so were promoted to the 2. Bundesliga.

Team 1	Agg.	Team 2	1st leg	2nd leg
Tennis Borussia Berlin (NE)	2–3	VfB Oldenburg (N)	1–1	1–2 aet
