= 2003–04 VfL Osnabrück season =

VfL Osnabrück
2003–04 season
- Manager: Frank Pagelsdorf (until 7 April); Thorsten Haas (from 8 April)
- Stadium: Stadion an der Bremer Brücke
- 2. Bundesliga: 18th (relegated)
- DFB-Pokal: First round
- Top goalscorer: League: Marcel Schied (12); All: Marcel Schied (12)

The 2003–04 VfL Osnabrück season was the club's 105th season in existence and the first season back in the top flight of German football. In addition to the domestic league, VfL Osnabrück participated in this season's edition of the DFB-Pokal. The season covered the period from 1 July 2003 to 30 June 2004.

== Transfers ==
=== In ===
No.	Pos	Player	Transferred from	Fee	Date	Source
15			TBD		1 July 2003	

=== Out ===
No.	Pos	Player	Transferred to	Fee	Date	Source
15			TBD		1 July 2003	

== Pre-season and friendlies ==
Win Draw Loss Fixtures

6 July 2003 Friendly	TuS Haste (Germany)	0–8	(Germany) VfL Osnabrück

8 July 2003 Friendly	SV Holdorf (Germany)	0–12	(Germany) VfL Osnabrück

12 July 2003 Friendly	Arminia Hannover (Germany)	0–5	(Germany) VfL Osnabrück

12 July 2003 Friendly	Hannover 96 (Germany)	2–0	(Germany) VfL Osnabrück

13 July 2003 Friendly	SC Lüstringen (Germany)	0–17	(Germany) VfL Osnabrück

15 July 2003 Friendly	Hamburger SV (A) (Germany)	0–4	(Germany) VfL Osnabrück

16 July 2003 Friendly	Kickers Emden (Germany)	1–1	(Germany) VfL Osnabrück

18 July 2003 Friendly	Werder Bremen (A) (Germany)	0–1	(Germany) VfL Osnabrück

20 July 2003 Friendly	Bayern Munich (A) (Germany)	6–5	(Germany) VfL Osnabrück

22 July 2003 Friendly	SV Meppen (Germany)	2–5	(Germany) VfL Osnabrück

23 July 2003 Friendly	Hansa Rostock (Germany)	1–1	(Germany) VfL Osnabrück

27 July 2003 Friendly	Maccabi Haifa (Israel)	2–2	(Germany) VfL Osnabrück

5 September 2003 Friendly	VfL Osnabrück (Germany)	1–0	(Netherlands) ADO Den Haag

9 September 2003 Friendly	VfL Osnabrück (Germany)	0–1	(Germany) Borussia Dortmund

10 October 2003 Friendly	VfL Osnabrück (Germany)	8–1	(Germany) Uwe-Brunn-Allstars

21 October 2003 Friendly	TV 01 Bohmte (Germany)	0–12	(Germany) VfL Osnabrück

14 November 2003 Friendly	VfL Osnabrück (Germany)	0–0	(Netherlands) RKC Waalwijk

19 November 2003 Friendly	Hannover 96 (A) (Germany)	4–4	(Germany) VfL Osnabrück

11 January 2004 Friendly	TSG Burg Gretesch (Germany)	0–24	(Germany) VfL Osnabrück

14 January 2004 Friendly	BW Hollage (Germany)	0–2	(Germany) VfL Osnabrück

16 January 2004 Friendly	SF Oesede (Germany)	0–6	(Germany) VfL Osnabrück

18 January 2004 Friendly	VfL Osnabrück (Germany)	0–1	(Germany) VfB Stuttgart

21 January 2004 Friendly	FC Schüttorf (Germany)	2–2	(Germany) VfL Osnabrück

24 January 2004 Friendly	Borussia Dortmund (Germany)	1–0	(Germany) VfL Osnabrück

14 April 2004 Friendly	Hamburger SV (Germany)	1–1	(Germany) VfL Osnabrück

12 May 2004 Friendly	Nordkreisauswahl (Germany)	0–6	(Germany) VfL Osnabrück

== Competitions ==
=== Overview ===
Competition	First match	Last match	Starting round	Final position	Record							
Competition	First match	Last match	Starting round	Final position	Pld	W	D	L	GF	GA	GD	Win %
2. Bundesliga	3 August 2003	23 May 2004	Matchday 1	18th	34	7	7	20	35	55	−20	20.59
DFB-Pokal	31 August 2003		First round	First round	1	0	1	0	0	0	+0	0.00
Total					35	7	8	20	35	55	−20	20.00

Source: Competitions

=== 2. Bundesliga ===
==== League table ====
Pos	Team	Pld	W	D	L	GF	GA	GD	Pts	Promotion or relegation
14	Karlsruher SC	34	11	10	13	38	44	−6	43	
15	VfB Lübeck (R)	34	9	12	13	47	57	−10	39	Relegation to Regionalliga (Note: VfB Lübeck, 1. FC Union Berlin and VfL Osnabrück were relegated to Regionalliga Nord. Jahn Regensburg was relegated to Regionalliga Süd.)
16	Jahn Regensburg (R)	34	9	12	13	37	51	−14	39	Relegation to Regionalliga
17	Union Berlin (R)	34	8	9	17	43	53	−10	33	Relegation to Regionalliga
18	VfL Osnabrück (R)	34	7	7	20	35	55	−20	28	Relegation to Regionalliga

Source: Bundesliga.de
Rules for classification: 1) points; 2) goal difference; 3) number of goals scored.
(R) Relegated

==== Results summary ====
Overall								Home						Away					
Pld	W	D	L	GF	GA	GD	Pts	W	D	L	GF	GA	GD	W	D	L	GF	GA	GD
34	7	7	20	35	55	−20	28	6	3	8	26	22	+4	1	4	12	9	33	−24

==== Results by round ====
Round	1	2	3	4	5	6	7	8	9	10	11	12	13	14	15	16	17	18	19	20	21	22	23	24	25	26	27	28	29	30	31	32	33	34
Ground	A	H	A	H	A	H	A	H	A	H	A	H	A	H	A	A	H	H	A	H	A	H	A	H	A	H	A	H	A	H	A	H	H	A
Result	W	L	L	D	L	L	D	D	D	W	L	W	L	W	L	L	L	L	L	W	D	L	L	L	L	W	L	W	D	L	L	L	D	L
Position	7	10	15	15	17	17	17	17	17	16	17	13	16	15	15	17	18	18	18	18	18	18	18	18	18	18	18	18	18	18	18	18	18	18

A = Away; H = Home; W = Win; D = Draw; L = Loss

==== Matches ====
3 August 2003 1	LR Ahlen	0–1	VfL Osnabrück	Ahlen
				Stadium: Wersestadion

10 August 2003 2	VfL Osnabrück	1–2	Karlsruher SC	Osnabrück
				Stadium: Stadion an der Bremer Brücke

17 August 2003 3	Wacker Burghausen	4–1	VfL Osnabrück	Burghausen
				Stadium: Wacker-Arena

24 August 2003 4	VfL Osnabrück	2–2	Mainz 05	Osnabrück
				Stadium: Stadion an der Bremer Brücke

14 September 2003 5	Energie Cottbus	3–0	VfL Osnabrück	Cottbus
				Stadium: Stadion der Freundschaft

21 September 2003 6	VfL Osnabrück	0–1	Erzgebirge Aue	Osnabrück
				Stadium: Stadion an der Bremer Brücke

28 September 2003 7	Greuther Fürth	1–1	VfL Osnabrück	Fürth
				Stadium: Playmobil-Stadion

3 October 2003 8	VfL Osnabrück	2–2	MSV Duisburg	Osnabrück
				Stadium: Stadion an der Bremer Brücke

17 October 2003 9	VfB Lübeck	1–1	VfL Osnabrück	Lübeck
				Stadium: Stadion an der Lohmühle

26 October 2003 10	VfL Osnabrück	2–1	SpVgg Unterhaching	Osnabrück
				Stadium: Stadion an der Bremer Brücke

2 November 2003 11	Jahn Regensburg	1–0	VfL Osnabrück	Regensburg
				Stadium: Jahnstadion Regensburg

7 November 2003 12	VfL Osnabrück	3–0	Eintracht Trier	Osnabrück
				Stadium: Stadion an der Bremer Brücke

21 November 2003 13	Union Berlin	2–0	VfL Osnabrück	Berlin
				Stadium: Stadion An der Alten Försterei

28 November 2003 14	VfL Osnabrück	3–1	Alemannia Aachen	Osnabrück
				Stadium: Stadion an der Bremer Brücke

7 December 2003 15	1. FC Nürnberg	2–0	VfL Osnabrück	Nuremberg
				Stadium: Frankenstadion

12 December 2003 16	Arminia Bielefeld	5–0	VfL Osnabrück	Bielefeld
				Stadium: Bielefelder Alm

16 December 2003 17	VfL Osnabrück	0–2	Rot-Weiß Oberhausen	Osnabrück
				Stadium: Stadion an der Bremer Brücke

1 February 2004 18	VfL Osnabrück	1–2	LR Ahlen	Osnabrück
				Stadium: Stadion an der Bremer Brücke

6 February 2004 19	Karlsruher SC	3–0	VfL Osnabrück	Karlsruhe
				Stadium: Wildparkstadion

13 February 2004 20	VfL Osnabrück	3–0	Wacker Burghausen	Osnabrück
				Stadium: Stadion an der Bremer Brücke

20 February 2004 21	Mainz 05	0–0	VfL Osnabrück	Mainz
				Stadium: Bruchwegstadion

29 February 2004 22	VfL Osnabrück	0–1	Energie Cottbus	Osnabrück
				Stadium: Stadion an der Bremer Brücke

7 March 2004 23	Erzgebirge Aue	1–0	VfL Osnabrück	Aue
				Stadium: Erzgebirgsstadion

14 March 2004 24	VfL Osnabrück	0–1	Greuther Fürth	Osnabrück
				Stadium: Stadion an der Bremer Brücke

19 March 2004 25	MSV Duisburg	3–1	VfL Osnabrück	Duisburg
				Stadium: Wedaustadion

26 March 2004 26	VfL Osnabrück	3–1	VfB Lübeck	Osnabrück
				Stadium: Stadion an der Bremer Brücke

4 April 2004 27	SpVgg Unterhaching	2–1	VfL Osnabrück	Unterhaching
				Stadium: Generali Sportpark

11 April 2004 28	VfL Osnabrück	3–0	Jahn Regensburg	Osnabrück
				Stadium: Stadion an der Bremer Brücke

18 April 2004 29	Eintracht Trier	0–0	VfL Osnabrück	Unterhaching
				Stadium: Moselstadion

23 April 2004 30	VfL Osnabrück	0–2	Union Berlin	Osnabrück
				Stadium: Stadion an der Bremer Brücke

30 April 2004 31	Alemannia Aachen	2–1	VfL Osnabrück	Aachen
				Stadium: Old Tivoli

7 May 2004 32	VfL Osnabrück	3–4	1. FC Nürnberg	Osnabrück
				Stadium: Stadion an der Bremer Brücke

16 May 2004 33	VfL Osnabrück	0–0	Arminia Bielefeld	Osnabrück
				Stadium: Stadion an der Bremer Brücke

23 May 2004 34	Rot-Weiß Oberhausen	3–2	VfL Osnabrück	Oberhausen
				Stadium: Niederrheinstadion

=== DFB-Pokal ===
31 August 2003 First round	VfL Osnabrück	0–0 (a.e.t.) (4–5 p)	Hansa Rostock	Osnabrück
				Stadium: Stadion an der Bremer Brücke
