= Cesar Klein =

German Expressionist painter and designer

César Klein (14 September 1876 – 13 March 1954) was a German Expressionist painter and designer, probably best known as one of the founders the November Group and the Arbeitsrat für Kunst. He is associated with the Düsseldorf school of painting.

He was born in Hamburg; when he was seventeen, his parents insisted that he be apprenticed to a craft painter. He later studied at the Hamburg School of Applied Arts, the Düsseldorf Art Academy, and the Royal Museum of Applied Arts in Berlin. In 1910, he was one of the 27 artists rejected from the Berlin Secession who responded by starting the New Secession. Klein created lithographs and woodcuts, stained glass windows and mosaics, and murals on walls and ceilings, in addition to his easel art.

Given the practical bent of his training, Klein frequently "worked in media that appealed to a mass audience, such as architectural decoration, applied art, poster design, and theater and film design...."

In 1913 he decorated the interior of the new Marmorhaus cinema in Berlin.

In the years after World War I Klein was associated with Walter Gropius, though he turned down Gropius's offer of a teaching position at the Bauhaus. Through the 1920s and after, Klein devoted much of his work to designs for theater and film production. He was the set designer for Robert Wiene's 1920 film Genuine, and for the 1924 production of Ernst Toller's Hinkemann.

Klein was included in the famous Degenerate Art exhibition mounted by the Nazi regime in 1937. He was able to resume his career in theatrical design after World War II. He died in 1954, at Pansdorf near Lübeck.
