= Michael Zeyer =

German footballer

Personal information
- Date of birth: 9 June 1968 (age 58)
- Place of birth: Neresheim, West Germany
- Height: 1.76 m (5 ft 9 in)
- Position: Midfielder

Youth career
- –1981: SV Auernheim
- 1981–1987: Heidenheimer SB

Senior career*
Years	Team	Apps	(Gls)
1987–1989	SSV Ulm	20	(0)
1989–1992	SC Freiburg	102	(9)
1992–1993	1. FC Kaiserslautern	21	(1)
1993–1996	Waldhof Mannheim	92	(7)
1996–1998	MSV Duisburg	67	(10)
1998–1999	VfB Stuttgart	26	(0)
1999–2003	MSV Duisburg	119	(14)
2003–2004	Fortuna Düsseldorf	33	(7)
2005	Knattspyrnudeild UMFG		
2006	1. FC Heidenheim	7	(1)
Total		487	(49)
- * Club domestic league appearances and goals

Michael "Zico" Zeyer (born 9 June 1968) is a German former professional footballer who played as a midfielder. He is the twin brother of Andreas Zeyer.

== Honours ==
MSV Duisburg

- DFB-Pokal finalist: 1997–98
