= Pansdorf =

- Village of Ratekau
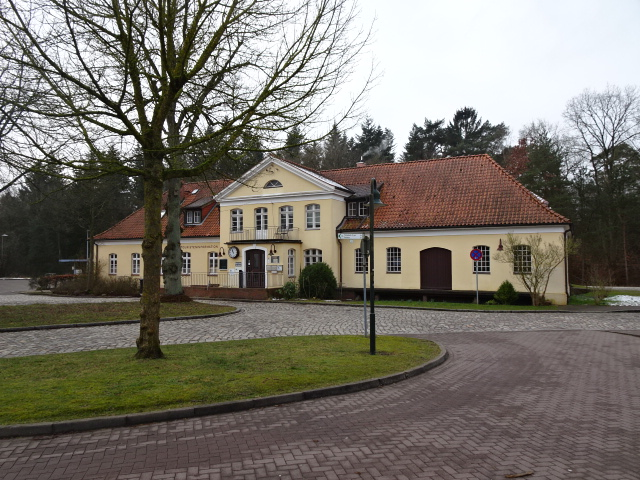
- Pansdorf train station
- Interactive map of Pansdorf
- Location within Germany Location within Schleswig-Holstein
- Coordinates: 53°59′10.2″N 10°42′31.7″E
- Country: Germany
- State: Schleswig-Holstein
- District: Ostholstein
- City: Ratekau

Government
  - Mayor: Kay-Uwe Westphal (=2022)
- Time zone: UTC+01:00 (CET)
  - Summer (DST): UTC+02:00 (CEST)
- Postal codes: 23689
- Vehicle registration: OH

Pansdorf is a village in the municipality of Ratekau in the northern German state of Schleswig-Holstein. With a population of 3,432 in 2022, it is the second most populated settlement in the Ratekau municipality.

== Geography ==
Pansdorf is located to the west of Timmendorfer Strand, roughly five kilometers from the Baltic coast. The Schwartau flows west of the village and marks parts of the border between its municipality (Ratekau) and the municipality of Scharbeutz, which also borders the village to the north.

To the west of Pansdorf lies a forest and the Pansdorfer bogland. Part of the forest was designated as the "Crewwald" (Crew forest) in a cooperation between the German musician Wincent Weiss and the government of Schleswig-Holstein. This entailed the planting of roughly 10,000 trees in the area.

Pansdorf is the only settlement of Ratekau with a train station. The train station lies on the Kiel–Lübeck railway, which runs west of the village, and is serviced by the RB84 and RB83 trains. To the east of Pansdorf lies the Bundesautobahn 1, to which the village is connected via the Ostseestraße.

== History ==
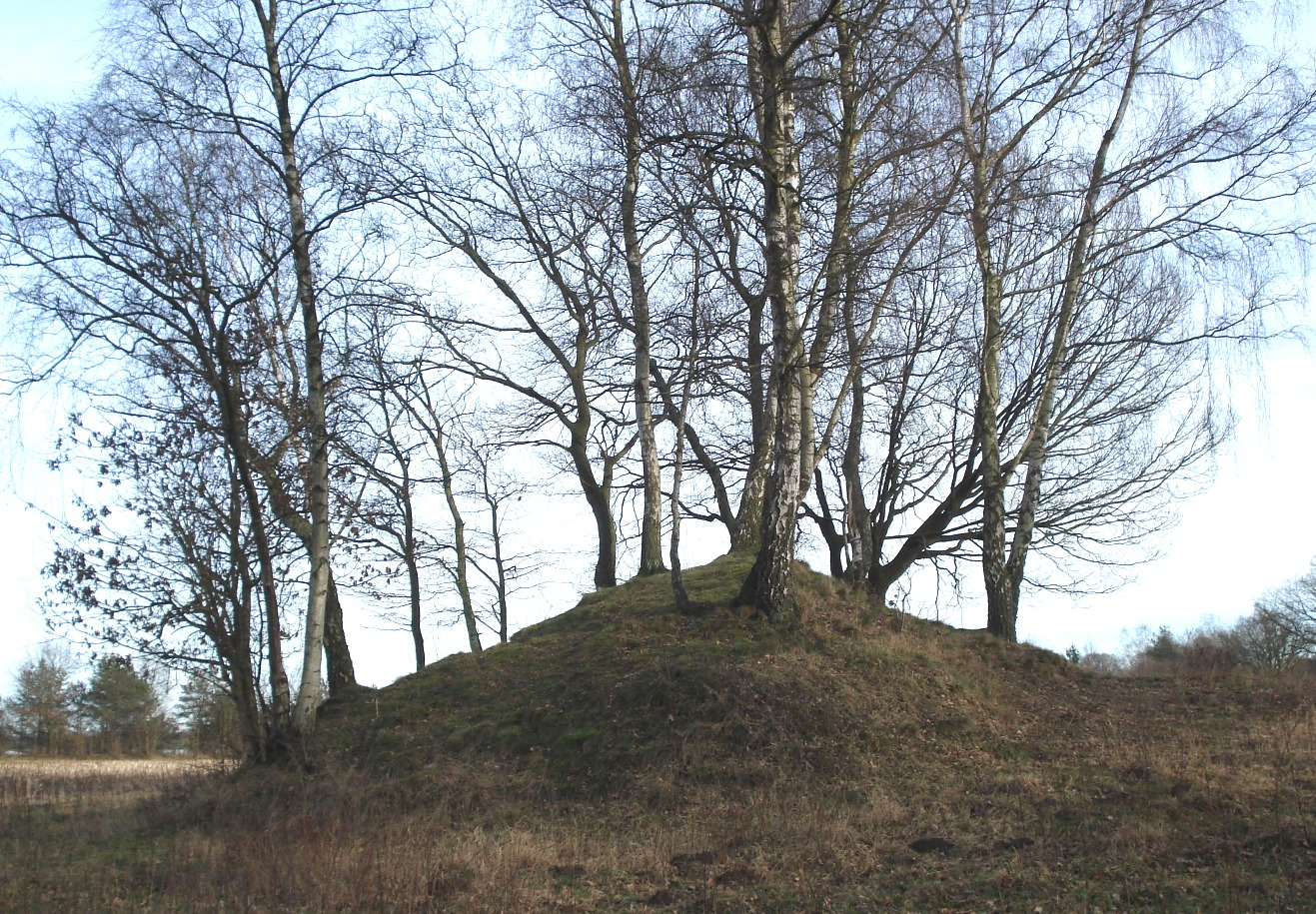
Unnamed tumulus in Pansdorf

The area of Pansdorf was first settled by Germanic peoples in the early Stone Age, as evidenced by the Grellberg, and another unnamed tumulus just north of the settlement. In 1845, forest ranger Carl Hermann would unearth a cista a cordoni (Rippenziste) dated near the end of the Nordic Bronze Age (ca. 500 BC). It is recognized as a particularly important find due to being the first object in the old Germanic north to feature an inscription, seemingly of linguistically Celtic origin.

Later, the area of what is today Pansdorf would be colonized by the Wends who would construct a gord, that is today known as the Blocksberg, during the 9th century. The remnants of the Blocksberg still exist in the village's forest and serve as a tourist attraction.

The name Pansdorf was likely derived from the names Pantae, Panteke, or Pantin; with the addition of the "-dorf" suffix, meaning village in German.

For most of its history, Pansdorf was part of the Bishopric, and after 1803, the secular Principality of Lübeck. On the 22 June 1857, the municipalities of Ratekau-East and Ratekau-West would be formed through a land reform. Pansdorf, along with 11 other settlements were organized into the municipality of Ratekau-West. In 1933, the municipalities of Ratekau-East and Ratekau-West would be merged into the single municipality of Ratekau, which included Pansdorf. Pansdorf would temporarily serve as the seat of the municipal government until the construction of the Ratekau town hall in 1939.

During World War II, Pansdorf was home to two forced labor commandos.

In October 2014, the special task force of the German police searched an apartment in Pansdorf whose residents were suspected of operating the illegal video-on-demand streaming website kinox.to. The raid on the apartment was the first major appearance of Pansdorf in the German media, primarily due to the case's peculiarity of a highly criminal operation, connected to an illegal streaming site, being run out of a children's bedroom.

== Demographics ==
The population of Pansdorf is 3,412 as of 2015.

Historical population

| Year | Pop. | ±% |
|---|---|---|
| 1885 | 357 | — |
| 1933 | 895 | +150.7% |
| 2008 | 3,596 | +301.8% |

| Year | Pop. | ±% |
|---|---|---|
| 2010 | 3,534 | −1.7% |
| 2015 | 3,412 | −3.5% |
| 2022 | 3,432 | +0.6% |

Sources: 1885–1933 2008, 2015, 2022

== Politics ==
The last village board was elected on the 26 October 2021, around 100 villagers gathered in the sports hall to elect all five candidates into the village board.

The current village board composition is as follows:

| Member | Role | Note |
|---|---|---|
| Christian Bruns | Village mayor | |
| Julia Nordorp | Village deputy mayor | |
| Sven Klusmann | Board member | |
| Kay-Uwe Westfahl | Board member | CDU member |
Elected but retired
| Jens-Henning Rathje | Board member | |

=== 2021 Federal election results ===
In the 2021 German federal election, Pansdorf had four polling stations, in three of which the SPD won a majority of party list votes, while the CDU won a majority of party list votes in only one of the polling stations. The SPD district candidate Bettina Hagedorn won a majority of constituency votes in all four polling stations. The minor party with the most votes in all but one of the polling stations was dieBasis.

=== Political parties ===
The headquarters of the local Ratekau branch of the FDP is located in Pansdorf.

== Culture ==
TSV Pansdorf is the local sports association of Pansdorf, founded in 1920. It is primarily known for football.

The only church in Pansdorf is the St. Michaeliskirche zu Pansdorf, which organizes community events in the village.

=== Sights ===
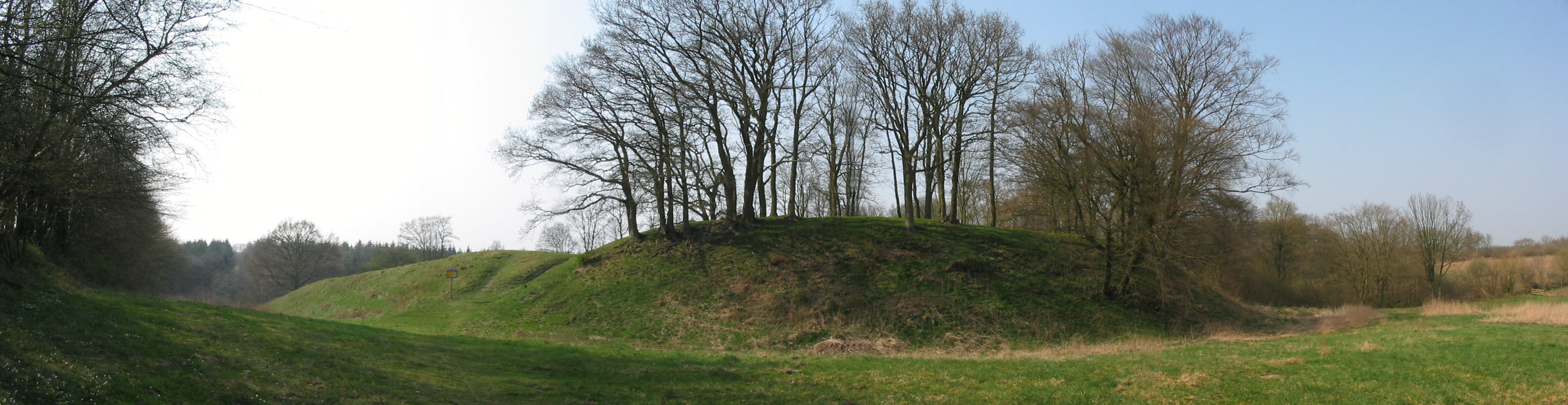
Panoramic view of the Blocksberg

The most notable sights of Pansdorf are its two ancient tumului and the Blocksberg. Also of note are the historic train station, a World War II memorial, and two former border stones.

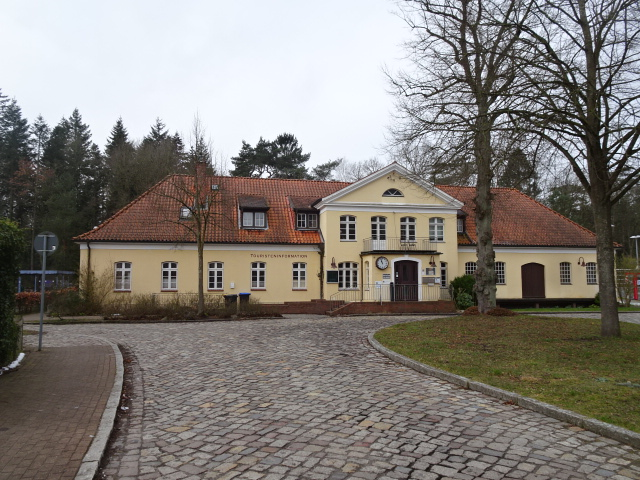
Historic train station

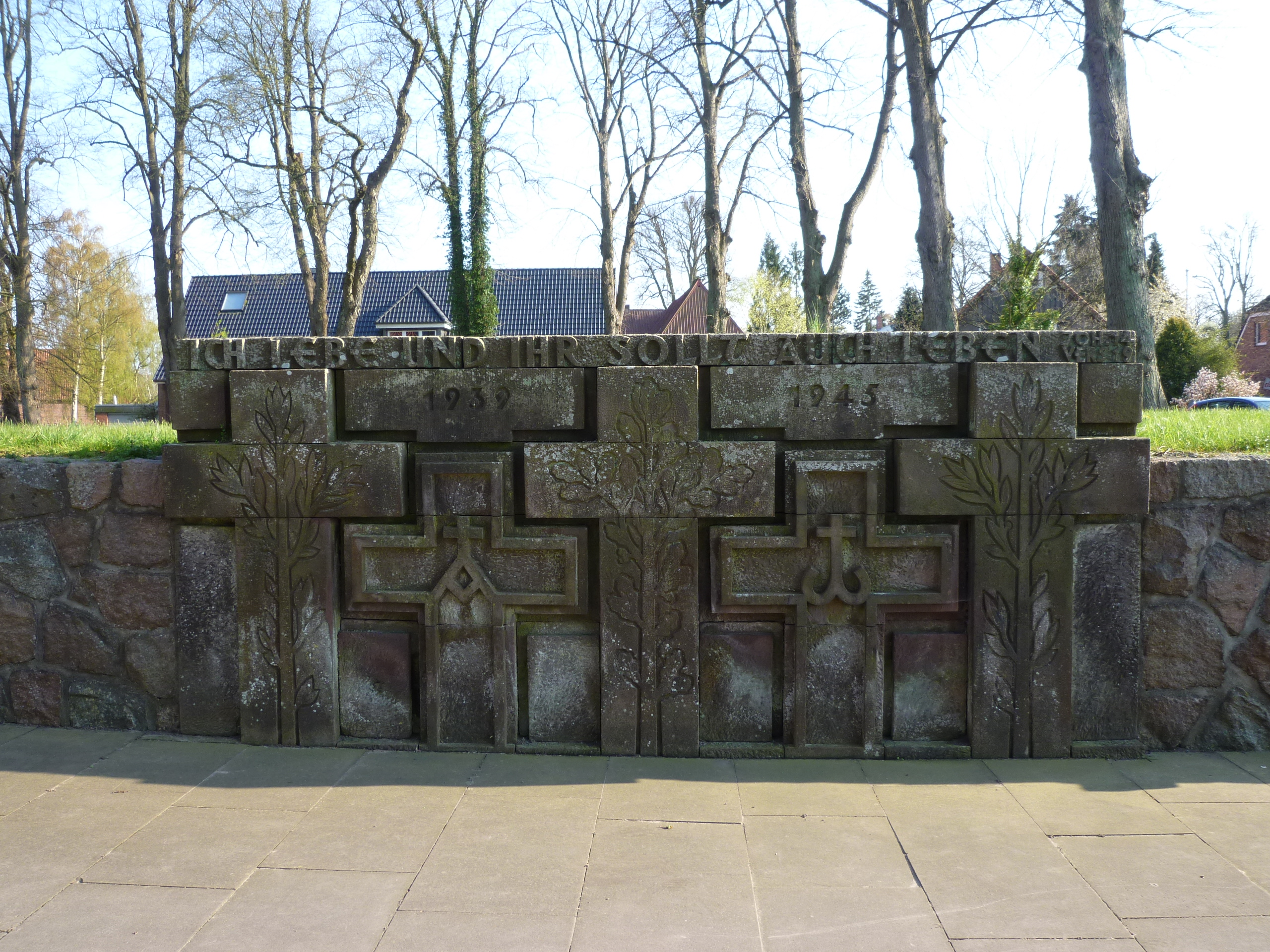
World War II memorial

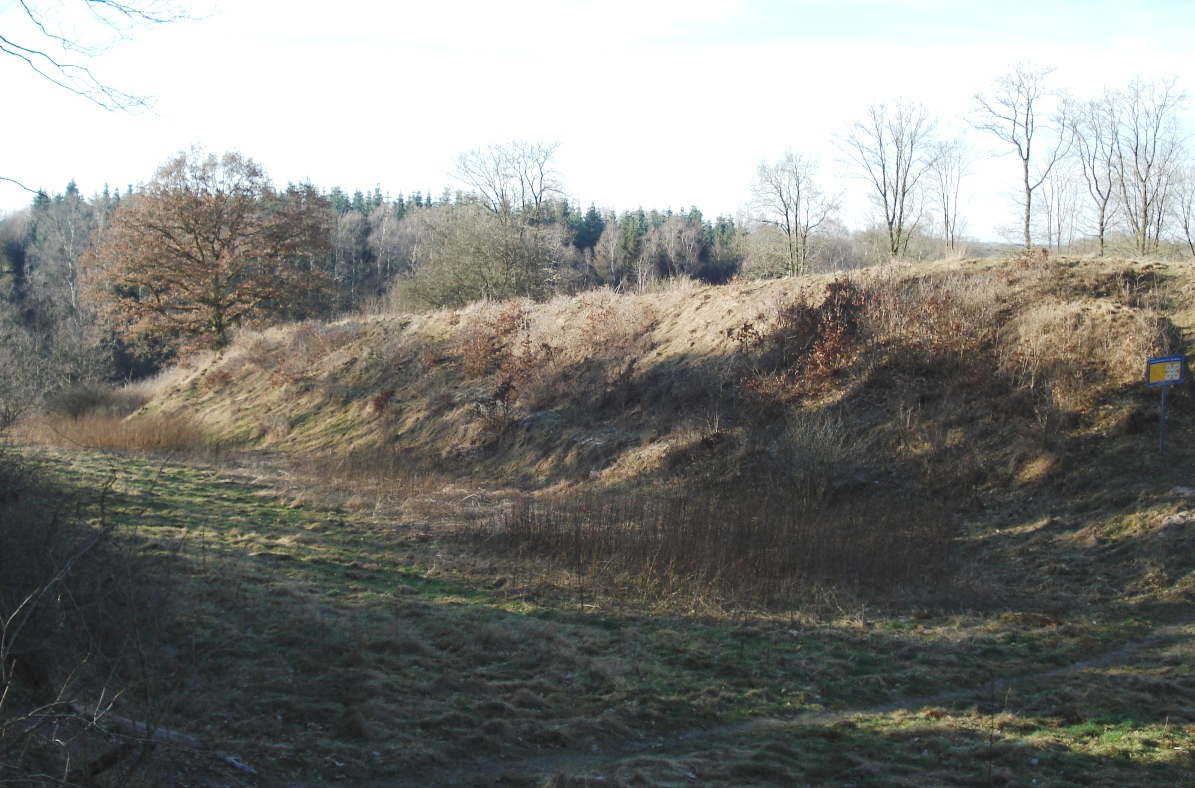
Blocksberg gord

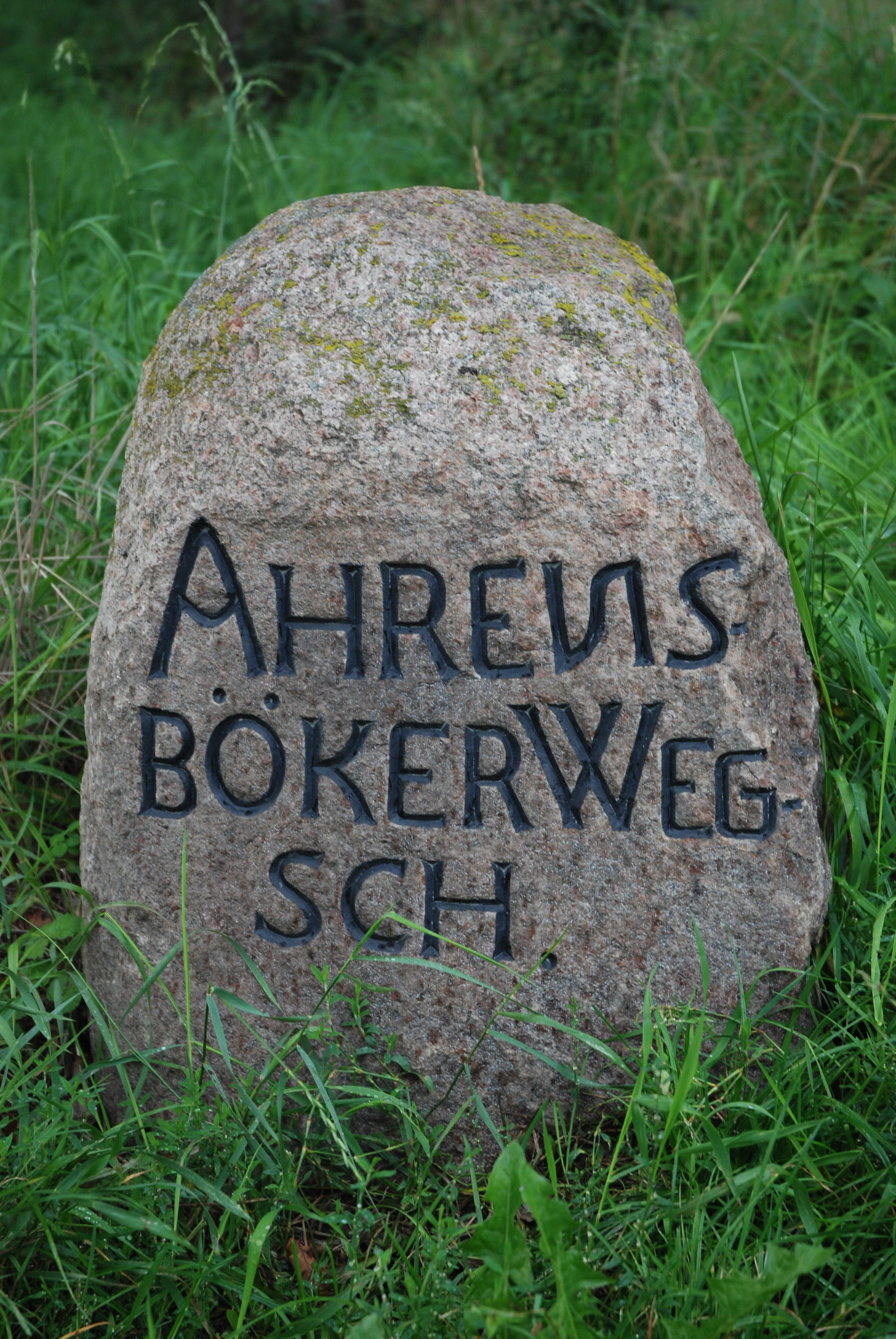
Border stone near Hünengrab

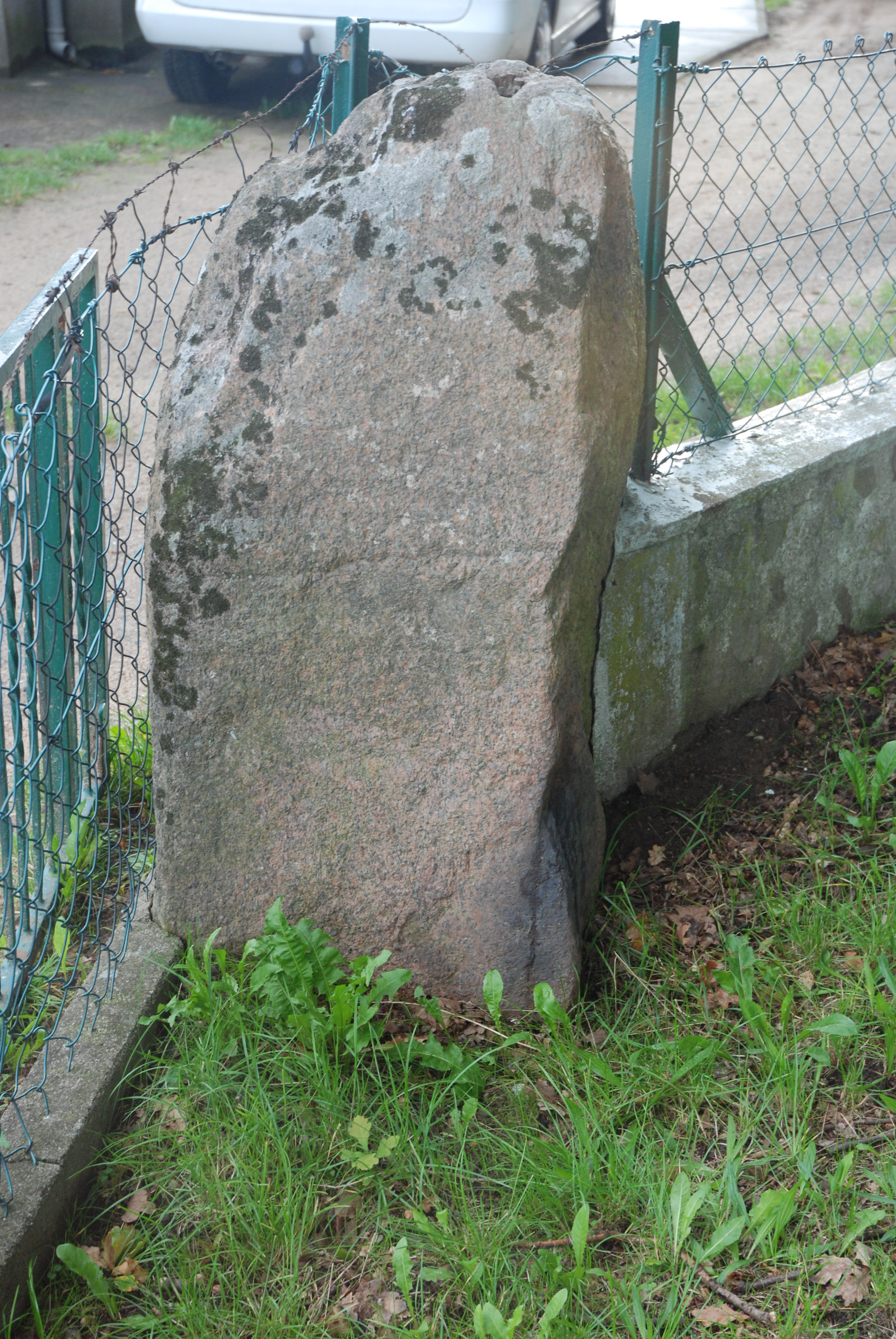
Border stone at Eutiner Straße 95

== Education ==
Pansdorf is home to the Otfried-Preußler-Schule elementary school, as well as three kindergartens, one evangelical, Kleine Raupe, and two secular ones, Wichtelclub and the forest kindergarten Die Waldkinder Pansdorf e.V. west of the settlement.

== Notable people ==
- Cesar Klein (1876-1954), German Expressionist painter and designer
- Gerd Hansen (born 1938), German economist and statistician
