= Bachirou Salou =

Togolese footballer

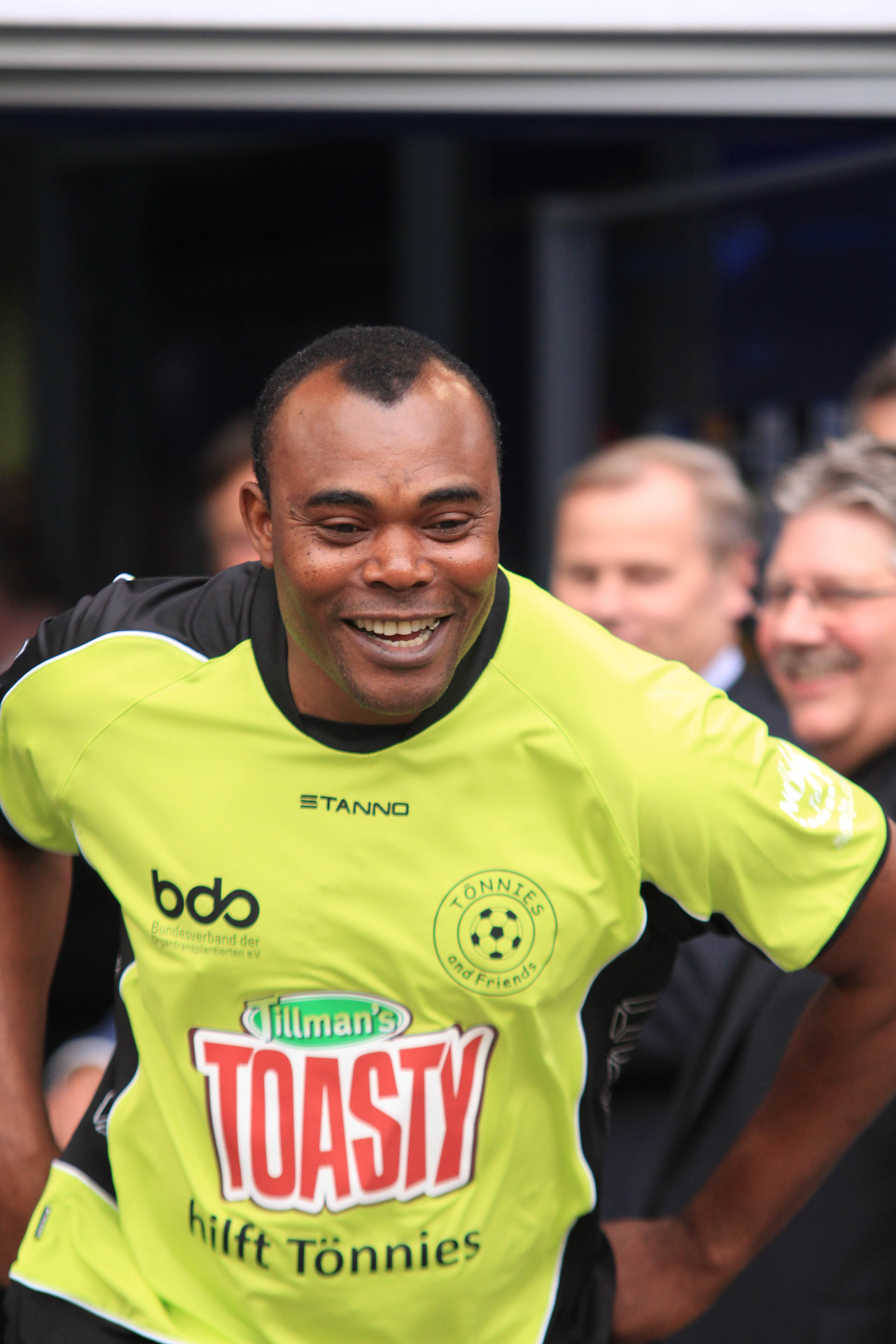
- Salou in 2012

Personal information
- Date of birth: 15 September 1970 (age 56)
- Place of birth: Lomé, Togo
- Height: 1.90 m (6 ft 3 in)
- Position: Centre forward

Youth career
- –1988: Omnisport Lomé
- 1989–1990: Panthere Sportive

Senior career*
Years	Team	Apps	(Gls)
1990–1995	Borussia M'gladbach	86	(13)
1995–1998	MSV Duisburg	95	(26)
1998–1999	Borussia Dortmund	25	(5)
1999–2000	Eintracht Frankfurt	34	(8)
2001–2003	Hansa Rostock	46	(7)
2003	Kapellen-Erft		
2004	Alemannia Aachen	14	(3)
2004	Eupen	12	(3)
2005–2006	Kapellen-Erft		
Total		312	(65)

International career
1987–1998	Togo	37	(7)
- * Club domestic league appearances and goals

Bachirou Salou (born 15 September 1970 in Lomé) is a former professional footballer who played as a centre-forward in the Bundesliga.

He possessed double nationality and is living in Germany together with his family, where he bought a house. Bachirou Salou has Nago- Benino roots. Rafiou Moutairou and Tadjou Salou are his siblings.

== Club career ==
=== Borussia Mönchengladbach ===
Born in Lomé, Salou was spotted at the age of 19 by former Czechoslovak international Anton Ondruš, who was on holiday in Cameroon and saw the player appear for Panthère Sportive . Knowing that the Club Borussia Mönchengladbach was looking for a striker, he conveyed him. Shortly afterwards Salou was invited to Germany. In 1990 he began to play as a striker for Borussia Mönchengladbach, where he quickly became a fan favourite.

In his time at Mönchengladbach, Salou helped the team win the 1995 DFB- Pokal, scoring 14 goals in 97 competitive games. In the 1993–94 season he netted five times in only nine contests.

=== Duisburg ===
In 1995 Salou moved to the second division with MSV Duisburg, winning promotion in his first year and experiencing his best years in the country overall, as he added 18 goals in the next two top flight seasons combined. His steady performances earned him many offers. FC Bayern München, Fenerbahce S.K. and Borussia Dortmund were some of these clubs. After all he chose to stay in Germany and transferred to former Champions League winner Borussia Dortmund.

He also became a fan favorite in MSV Duisburg. The DFB Cup final in 1997–98 season against FC Bayern München made Salou become popular in Duisburg, where to this day, he is celebrated.

After another solid year with Eintracht Frankfurt, Salou joined FC Hansa Rostock in January 2001.

=== Later career ===
After a brief time in Belgium, with K.A.S Eupen, Salou returned to Germany in January 2004 and signed with Alemannia Aachen. He played 15 years in both major levels of German football, totalling exactly 300 games and 62 goals.

== International career ==
Salou gained 38 caps for Togo during a nine-year span, making his international debut at age 19. He retired from football the year before the nation reached its first ever FIFA World Cup.

== Personal life ==
Nowadays Salou lives near Mönchengladbach, during the World cup in year 2006 he worked as team manager for the Togolese National team. He is also related to Tadjou Salou and Rafiou Moutairou.

After retiring, Salou became involved with the initiative Go for Children – Momentum for Change!, as an ambassador.

His son Mamoudou Salou, who was born in 1989, also plays soccer as a striker for SV Uedesheim.

== Honours ==
Borussia Mönchengladbach

- DFB-Pokal: 1994–95; Runner-up 1991–92

MSV Duisburg

- DFB-Pokal Runner-up: 1997–98

Alemannia Aachen

- DFB-Pokal Runner-up: 2003–04
