= Daniel Scheinhardt =

German footballer

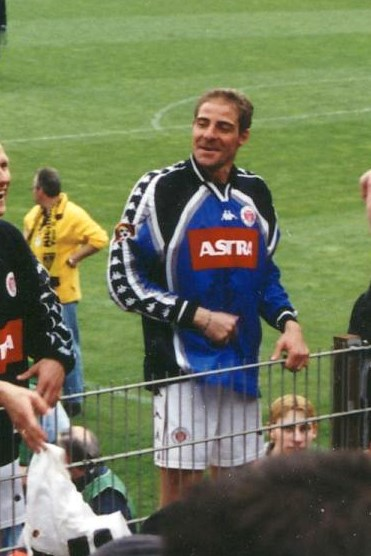
- Scheinhardt with FC St. Pauli

Personal information
- Date of birth: 25 October 1970 (age 56)
- Place of birth: West Berlin, West Germany
- Height: 1.86 m (6 ft 1 in)
- Position: Defender

Youth career
- –1984: SC Westend 1901
- 1984–1988: Tennis Borussia Berlin

Senior career*
Years	Team	Apps	(Gls)
1989–1994	Hertha BSC	92	(2)
1994–1996	VfL Osnabrück	45	(2)
1996–1998	Alemannia Aachen	44	(6)
1998–2000	Rot-Weiß Oberhausen	52	(0)
2000–2003	FC St. Pauli	42	(0)
2003–2005	Tennis Borussia Berlin	53	(1)
2005	Berliner AK 07	9	(0)
2006–2007	Torgelower SV Greif	35	(0)
Total		372	(11)
- * Club domestic league appearances and goals

Daniel Scheinhardt (born 25 October 1970) is a German former professional footballer who played as a defender.
