= Dariusz Pasieka =

Polish footballer and manager

Personal information
- Full name: Dariusz Pasieka
- Date of birth: 3 August 1965 (age 61)
- Place of birth: Chojnice, Poland
- Height: 1.91 m (6 ft 3 in)
- Position: Defender

Senior career*
Years	Team	Apps	(Gls)
- Chojniczanka Chojnice
1984–1993	Zawisza Bydgoszcz		
1993–1995	Nea Salamis Famagusta	52	(6)
1995–1997	Dynamo Dresden	51	(11)
1997–2003	Waldhof Mannheim	149	(19)

Managerial career
- 2003: Waldhof Mannheim II
- 2003–2004: TSG Weinheim
- 2005–2006: Jahn Regensburg
- 2009–2011: Arka Gdynia
- 2011–2012: Cracovia
- * Club domestic league appearances and goals

Dariusz Pasieka (born 3 August 1965) is a Polish professional football manager and former player. He was most recently the director of Arka Gdynia's academy.
