= Abdelaziz Bennij =

Moroccan footballer

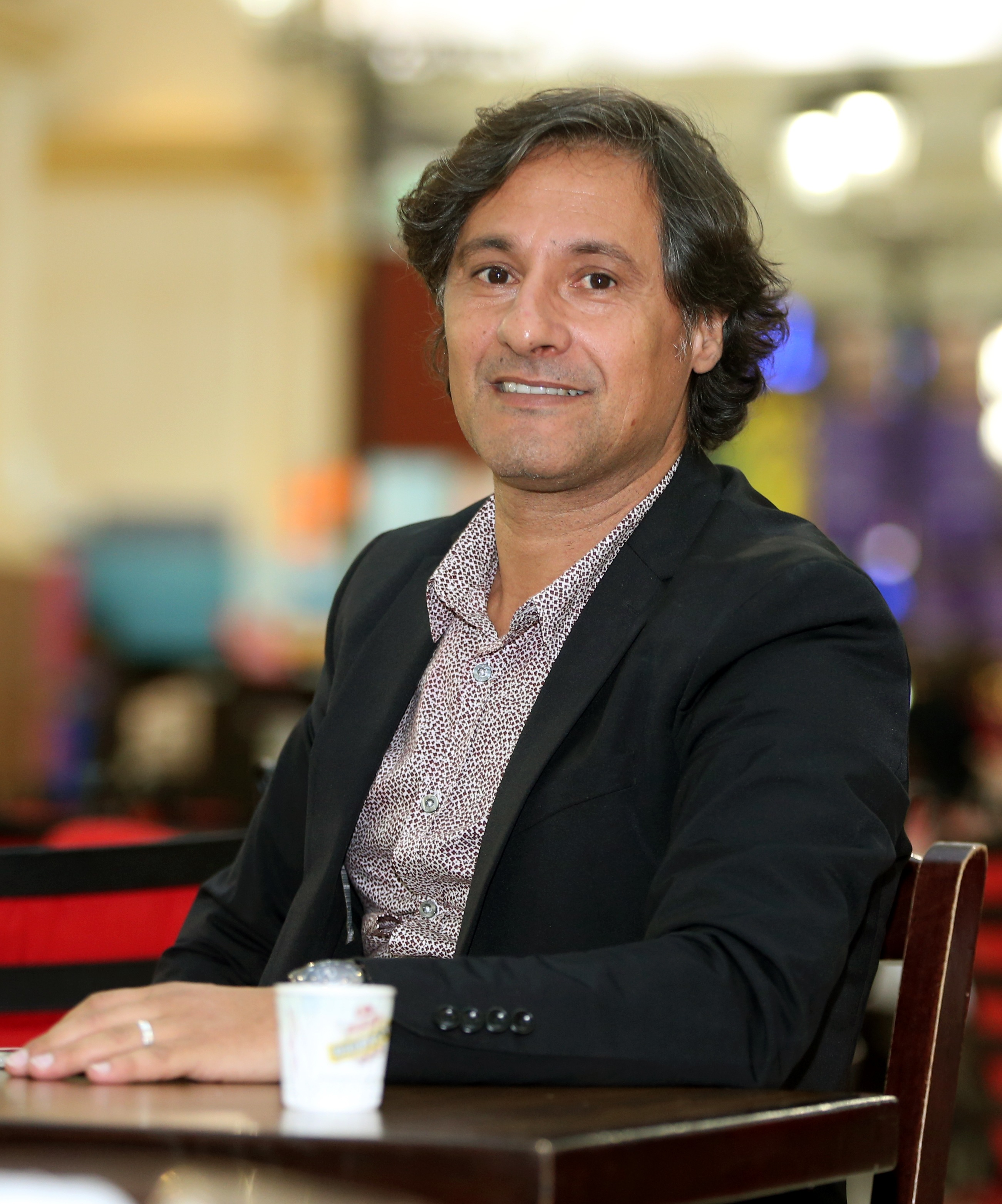
- Abdelaziz Bennij in 2015

Personal information
- Full name: Abdelaziz Bennij
- Date of birth: October 8, 1965 (age 61)
- Place of birth: Casablanca, Morocco
- Height: 1.76 m (5 ft 9 in)
- Position: Midfielder

Senior career*
Years	Team	Apps	(Gls)
1986–1987	Wydad Casablanca	–	(–)
1987–1992	Nancy	14	(0)
1988–1989	→ Cholet (loan)	16	(10)
1989–1990	→ Chamois Niortais (loan)	1	(0)
1992–1999	Eintracht Trier	–	(–)

International career
–	Morocco	34	(0)
- * Club domestic league appearances and goals

Abdelaziz Bennij (born October 8, 1965) is a Moroccan former professional footballer. He played as a midfielder. During his career, he was awarded 34 caps for the Morocco national football team.

In 2012–2013 and in early 2014 Bennij worked as the football team manager with Al-Arabi SC (Qatar). In 2015, he was appointed as the head coach of the Qatari women's team.
