= Dirk van der Ven =

German footballer

Personal information
- Date of birth: 1 March 1970 (age 56)
- Place of birth: Duisburg, West Germany
- Height: 1.85 m (6 ft 1 in)
- Position: Striker

Youth career
- TuS Holzen Sommerberg
- VfR Sölde
- VfL Schwerte

Senior career*
Years	Team	Apps	(Gls)
1987–1990	SG Wattenscheid 09	18	(2)
1990–1991	1. FC Schweinfurt 05	3	(1)
1991–1992	VfB Westhofen		
1992–1995	Rot-Weiss Lüdenscheid		
1995–1997	FC Gütersloh	66	(31)
1997–1998	LR Ahlen	6	(1)
1998–1999	KFC Uerdingen 05	44	(9)
1999–2003	Arminia Bielefeld	78	(8)
2003	Yokohama FC	9	(1)
2003–2004	Rot-Weiss Essen	11	(0)
2004–2005	FC Gütersloh	6	(0)
2005–2006	SG Bustedt		
- * Club domestic league appearances and goals

Dirk van der Ven (born 1 March 1970) is a German former professional footballer who played as a striker. He spent two seasons in the Bundesliga with Arminia Bielefeld.
