= Sven Fischer (footballer) =

German footballer

Personal information
- Date of birth: 7 January 1977 (age 49)
- Place of birth: Weiterstadt, West Germany
- Height: 1.74 m (5 ft 9 in)
- Position: Defender

Senior career*
Years	Team	Apps	(Gls)
1995–1997	1. FC Köln II		
1997–1999	Hannover 96	3	(0)
1999–2000	TuS Celle FC		
2000–2001	SV Wilhelmshaven	33	(0)
2001–2004	Rot-Weiss Essen	62	(5)

International career
1995	Germany U20	2	(0)
- * Club domestic league appearances and goals

Sven Fischer (born 7 January 1977) is a German retired professional footballer who played as a defender. Fischer made two appearances in the 2. Bundesliga for Hannover 96. He represented the Germany U20 national team at the 1995 FIFA World Youth Championship.
