= Dragan Trkulja =

Serbian football manager and player

Personal information
- Date of birth: 30 September 1964 (age 62)
- Place of birth: Sombor, SFR Yugoslavia
- Height: 1.82 m (6 ft 0 in)
- Position: Striker

Senior career*
Years	Team	Apps	(Gls)
1984–1985	Novi Sad	12	(0)
1989–1992	Bečej	30+	(14+)
1992–2002	SSV Ulm 1846	238+	(110+)
2009–2010	Eintracht Autenried	13	(7)
Total		293+	(131+)

Managerial career
- 2009–2012: Eintracht Autenried
- 2014–2015: SV Mähringen
- 2015–2016: Türkgücü Ulm
- 2017–2018: RSV Hohenmemmingen
- 2018–2019: SV Hörvelsingen
- * Club domestic league appearances and goals

Dragan Trkulja (Serbian Cyrillic: Драган Тркуља; born 30 September 1964) is a Serbian football manager and former player.

== Playing career ==
Trkulja played for Novi Sad during the 1984–85 Yugoslav Second League. He later joined Bečej, helping the club win the Yugoslav Second League in the 1991–92 season, contributing with 14 goals in 30 appearances.

In the summer of 1992, Trkulja moved abroad and signed with SSV Ulm 1846 in the German fourth division, helping them earn promotion to the Bundesliga within seven seasons. He was the top scorer in the 1995–96 Regionalliga with 25 goals. Following the club's relegation to the German fifth division due to licensing problems, Trkulja remained with the club and helped them beat Bundesliga side 1. FC Nürnberg during the 2001–02 DFB-Pokal.

== Managerial career ==
Trkulja served as manager of numerous German amateur clubs, including Eintracht Autenried and RSV Hohenmemmingen.
