= Atilla Birlik =

German-Turkish footballer

Personal information
- Date of birth: 27 November 1977 (age 48)
- Place of birth: Ludwigshafen, West Germany
- Height: 1.75 m (5 ft 9 in)
- Position: Forward

Senior career*
Years	Team	Apps	(Gls)
1996–1999	Waldhof Mannheim	85	(12)
1999–2002	Antalyaspor		
2002–2003	Greuther Fürth	23	(2)
2003–2005	Malatyaspor	1	(0)
2005	Gençlerbirliği		
2005–2006	Diyarbakirspor	9	(0)
2006	Sivasspor	2	(0)
2006–2007	Malatyaspor		
- * Club domestic league appearances and goals

Atilla Birlik (born 27 November 1977) is a German-Turkish former professional footballer who played as a forward.

His career was based in Germany and Turkey, playing for Waldhof Mannheim, Antalyaspor, Greuther Fürth Malatyaspor, Gençlerbirliği, Diyarbakirspor and Sivasspor.
