= Heiko Weber =

German footballer (1965–2026)

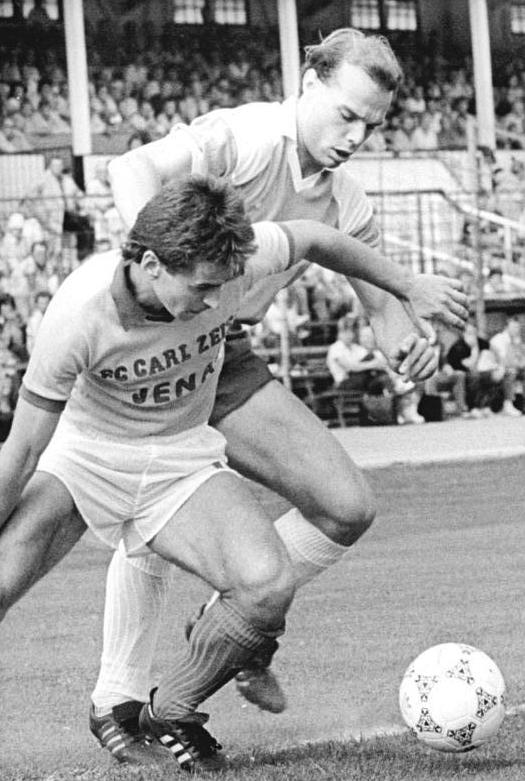
- Weber (front) in 1988

Personal information
- Date of birth: 26 June 1965
- Place of birth: Thale, Bezirk Halle, East Germany
- Date of death: 26 October 2026 (aged 61)
- Position: Forward

Youth career
- 1975–1988: BSG Stahl Thale

Senior career*
Years	Team	Apps	(Gls)
1988–1998	Carl Zeiss Jena		
1999–2000	Preußen Münster		

Managerial career
- 2001–2003: FC Thüringen Weida
- 2003–2004: Carl Zeiss Jena (youth)
- 2004–2007: Carl Zeiss Jena
- 2007–2008: Energie Cottbus II
- 2007: Energie Cottbus (caretaker)
- 2008–2009: Erzgebirge Aue
- 2013–2015: SSV Markranstädt
- 2015–2023: ZFC Meuselwitz
- * Club domestic league appearances and goals

Heiko Weber (26 June 1965 – 26 October 2026) was a German football player and coach. A forward, he spent most of his career of his playing career with Carl Zeiss Jena.

== Playing career ==
In 1988, Weber moved from BSG Stahl Thale, where he had gained his first experience of national GDR football as a teenager in the second division league in 1983–84, to Carl Zeiss Jena, where he played until 1998. As a result of the unification of East and West German football, the team from Jena made the leap from the Oberliga of the no longer existing GDR to the 2nd Bundesliga of reunified Germany in the summer of 1991. Weber played 148 times (36 goals) for Jena in the second highest division of German football. In addition, he played 33 games in the Regionalliga for the Zeiss team in 1994–95.

From 1998 to 1999 he played for the regional league club Preußen Münster, before he briefly returned to Thuringia to play for FCC, who had meanwhile also been relegated to the northeast variant of the third league level without him.

== Coaching career ==
Weber then became coach of FC Thüringen Weida. In 2003–04 he was coach of the A-youth team of FC Carl Zeiss. In June 2004 he took over the Jena first team. Under his direction the team managed to gain promotion from the North East Football League (South Division) to the North Regional League in 2005 and in 2006 made a surprise breakthrough into the 2nd Bundesliga. On 11 April 2007, Weber was released from Carl Zeiss Jena because the team was in acute danger of relegation.

In May 2007, he became coach of the regional league team Energie Cottbus II, where he signed a two-year contract. After Petrik Sander was given leave of absence, he led the professional training as interim coach and was then replaced by Bojan Prašnikar as coach of the professional team.

From April 2008 to June 2009 he was team manager at Erzgebirge Aue. At the same time he began training as a football coach at the Cologne Sports University.

From 1 July 2009 to 31 May 2010, Weber returned to Carl Zeiss Jena, where he worked as sporting director. Because he was still completing his football coaching training, he initially worked part-time. It was not until 1 April 2010 that Weber successfully completed his training. On 20 April 2011, Carl Zeiss Jena announced that Weber would replace Wolfgang Frank as coach with immediate effect. On 30 October 2011, Carl Zeiss Jena announced Weber's dismissal after continued lack of success. From July 2013 to June 2015, Weber was coach of the upper division club SSV Markranstädt. From 2015 to 2020 he was coach of the regional club ZFC Meuselwitz. In the summer of 2020, he took over the youth performance center and the reserve team of Carl Zeiss Jena. After Jena withdrew its second team from the competition in 2022, Weber again became coach of ZFC Meuselwitz. After five consecutive defeats in competitive matches, Weber was dismissed on 18 April 2023.

== Death ==
Weber died from pancreatic cancer on 26 October 2026, at the age of 61.
