= Wolfram Klein =

German footballer

Personal information
- Full name: Wolfram Klein
- Date of birth: 8 September 1968 (age 58)
- Place of birth: Nettetal-Breyell, West Germany
- Height: 1.87 m (6 ft 2 in)
- Position: Striker

Youth career
- SC Lobberich

Senior career*
Years	Team	Apps	(Gls)
1992–1994	Wuppertaler SV	48	(13)
1994–1998	Rot-Weiss Essen	108	(48)
1998–1999	Alemannia Aachen	26	(4)
1999–2001	Fortuna Düsseldorf	19	(0)
2001–2007	SV Straelen		
- * Club domestic league appearances and goals

Wolfram Klein (born 8 September 1968 in Nettetal-Breyell) is a former German footballer.

Klein made 83 appearances in the 2. Fußball-Bundesliga during his playing career.
