= Ratekau =

- Municipality
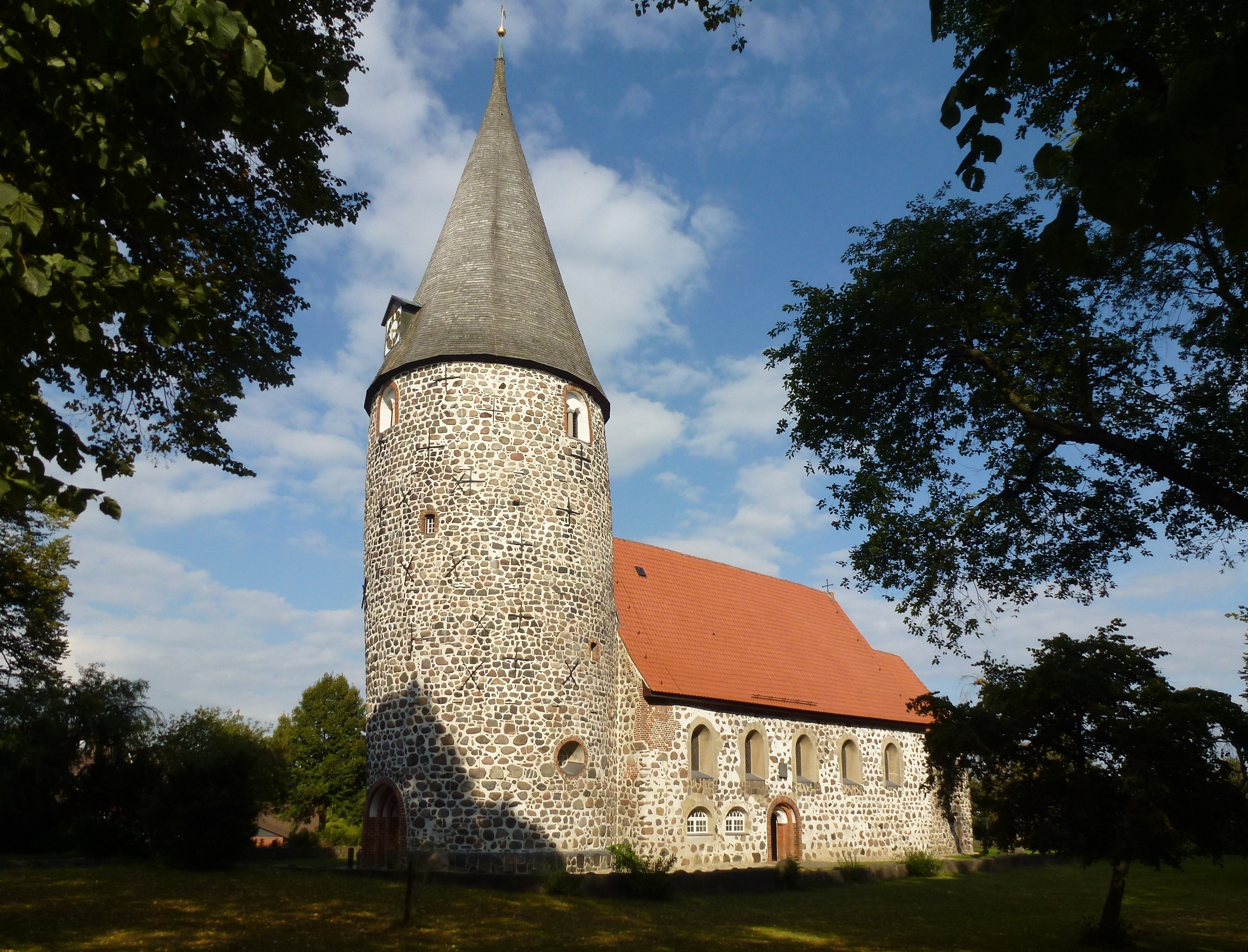
- Church in Ratekau

- Coat of arms

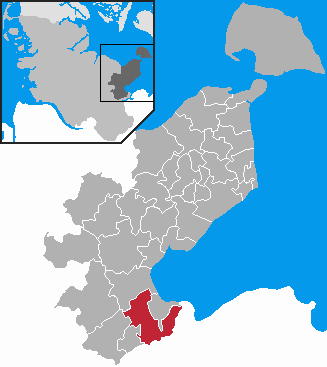
- Location of Ratekau within Ostholstein district
- Interactive map of Ratekau
- Location within Germany Location within Schleswig-Holstein
- Coordinates: 53°57′N 10°44′E
- Country: Germany
- State: Schleswig-Holstein
- District: Ostholstein

Government
  - Mayor: Thomas Keller

Area
  - Total: 59.62 km^{2} (23.02 sq mi)
- Elevation: 20 m (66 ft)

Population (2025-12-31)
  - Total: 15,484
  - Density: 259.7/km^{2} (672.6/sq mi)
- Time zone: UTC+01:00 (CET)
  - Summer (DST): UTC+02:00 (CEST)
- Postal codes: 23626
- Dialling codes: 04504 (Sereetz: 0451)
- Vehicle registration: OH
- Website: www.ratekau.de

Ratekau (German pronunciation: [ˈʁaːtəˌkaʊ]) is a municipality in the district of Ostholstein, in Schleswig-Holstein, Germany. It is situated approximately 10 km northeast of Lübeck.

It is the place where Blücher surrendered after the Battle of Lübeck in 1806.

The village is best known for its well preserved fieldstone church St. Vicelin of 1156.
