= Olaf Holetschek =

German footballer

Personal information
- Date of birth: 12 July 1968 (age 58)
- Place of birth: Saalfeld, East Germany
- Height: 1.82 m (6 ft 0 in)
- Position: Midfielder

Youth career
- –1981: Stahl Maxhütte
- 1981–1986: Carl Zeiss Jena

Senior career*
Years	Team	Apps	(Gls)
1986–1988	Carl Zeiss Jena	2	(0)
1988	Jenaer Glaswerk		
1989–1998	Carl Zeiss Jena	274	(38)
1998–2000	Hansa Rostock	37	(1)
2000–2001	Chemnitzer FC	19	(2)
2001–2005	Carl Zeiss Jena	97	(25)

Managerial career
- 2005–2007: Carl Zeiss Jena II
- 2007–2008: Carl Zeiss Jena (assistant)
- 2008–2011: Carl Zeiss Jena U19
- 2011–2012: RB Leipzig U17
- 2012–2015: RB Leipzig II (assistant)
- * Club domestic league appearances and goals

Olaf Holetschek (born 12 July 1968) is a German former footballer who plays as a midfielder.
