= Jürgen Serr =

German footballer

Personal information
- Date of birth: 21 May 1965 (age 61)
- Place of birth: Hamm, West Germany
- Height: 1.72 m (5 ft 8 in)
- Position: Midfielder

Senior career*
| Years | Team | Apps | (Gls) |
| 1983–1984? | ASV Landau | | |
| 1987?–1988 | SV Südwest Ludwigshafen | | |
| 1988–1989 | VfR Mannheim | | |
| 1989–1992 | Rot-Weiss Essen | | |
| 1992–2000 | SC Preußen Münster | | |
| 2000–2001 | Lüner SV | | |
| 2001–2002 | Germania Ratingen | | |

Managerial career
- 2006–2007: SC Greven 09
- 2017–2018: Hammer SpVg (youth)
- * Club domestic league appearances and goals

Jürgen Serr (born 21 May 1965) is a retired German football midfielder.
