= Moselstadion =

Sports stadium in Trier, Germany

- Moselstadion
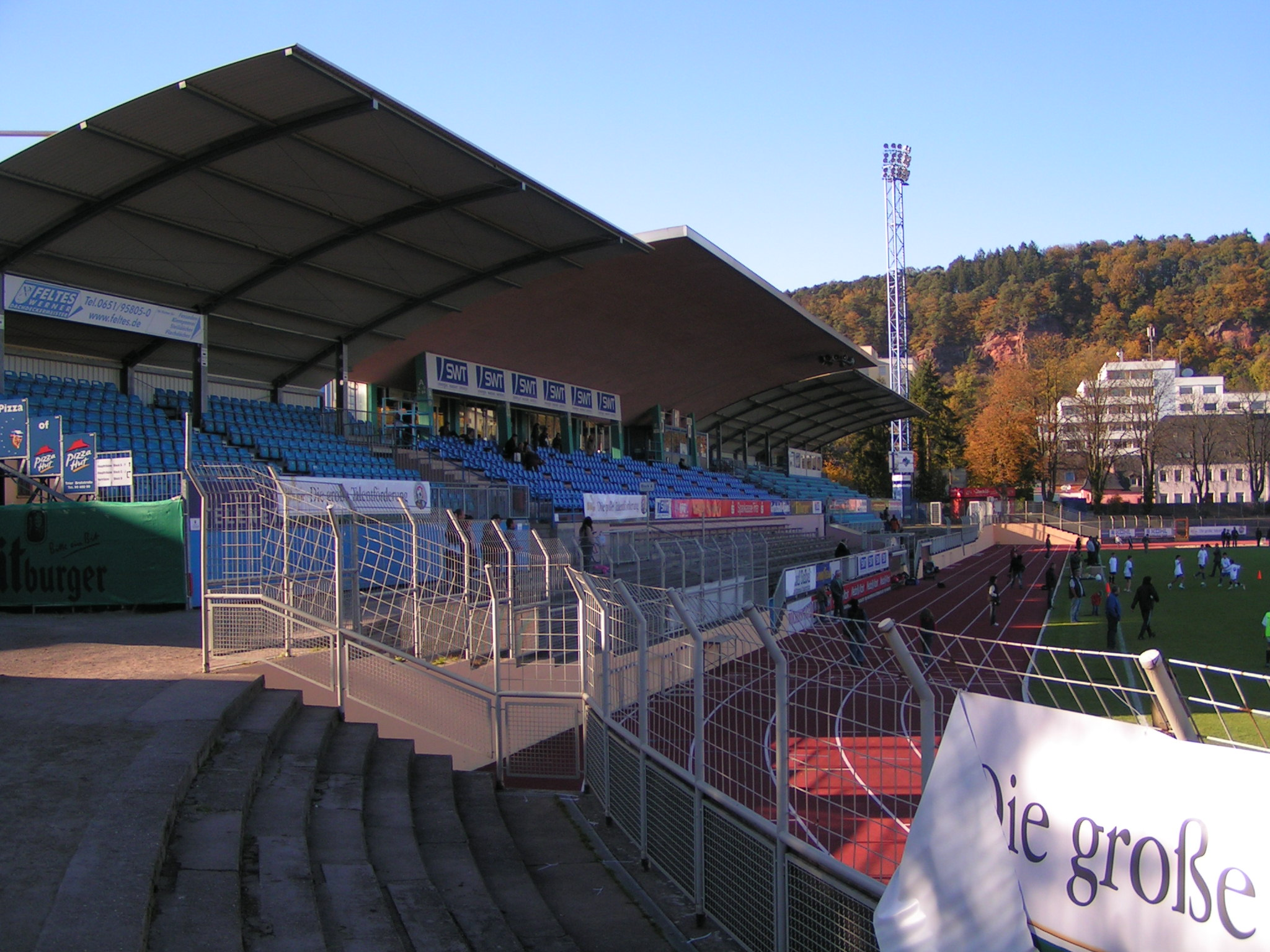
- Interactive map of Moselstadion
- Location: Trier, Germany
- Coordinates: 49°46′5″N 6°38′52″E
- Owner: City of Trier
- Capacity: 10,256
- Surface: Grass

Construction
- Groundbreaking: February 1937
- Opened: 1930
- Renovated: 1998, 2003
- Expanded: 2002

Tenant
- Eintracht Trier (1934-present)

The Moselstadion is a football and athletics stadium in Trier, Germany. Football club Eintracht Trier uses the stadium to host its home games. It has a capacity for 10,256 spectators. The stadium is about 1.5 km north of the city centre.

== History ==
In 1930, the sports facility was "On The D'Ham", as the area was still called then inaugurated. After the Second World War, the facility was named the Moselstadion. In 1998 on the occasion of the DFB Cup semi-final match against MSV Duisburg, floodlights were erected. After the promotion of Eintracht Trier to the 2. Bundesliga in the 2002-03 season, many repairs were needed. In addition, the main grandstand was expanded and a clubhouse was built, covering the back straight. Due to the rise in visitor numbers and inadequate safety standards of the stadium, heated discussions arose about a major expansion or new construction of the stadium.

Since the relegation of the club in 2005 and later descent into the fourth-tier Regionalliga, the corresponding plans have been deferred.
