= Stadion Lohmühle =

Football stadium in Lübeck, Germany

Coordinates: 53°52′52″N 10°40′08″E

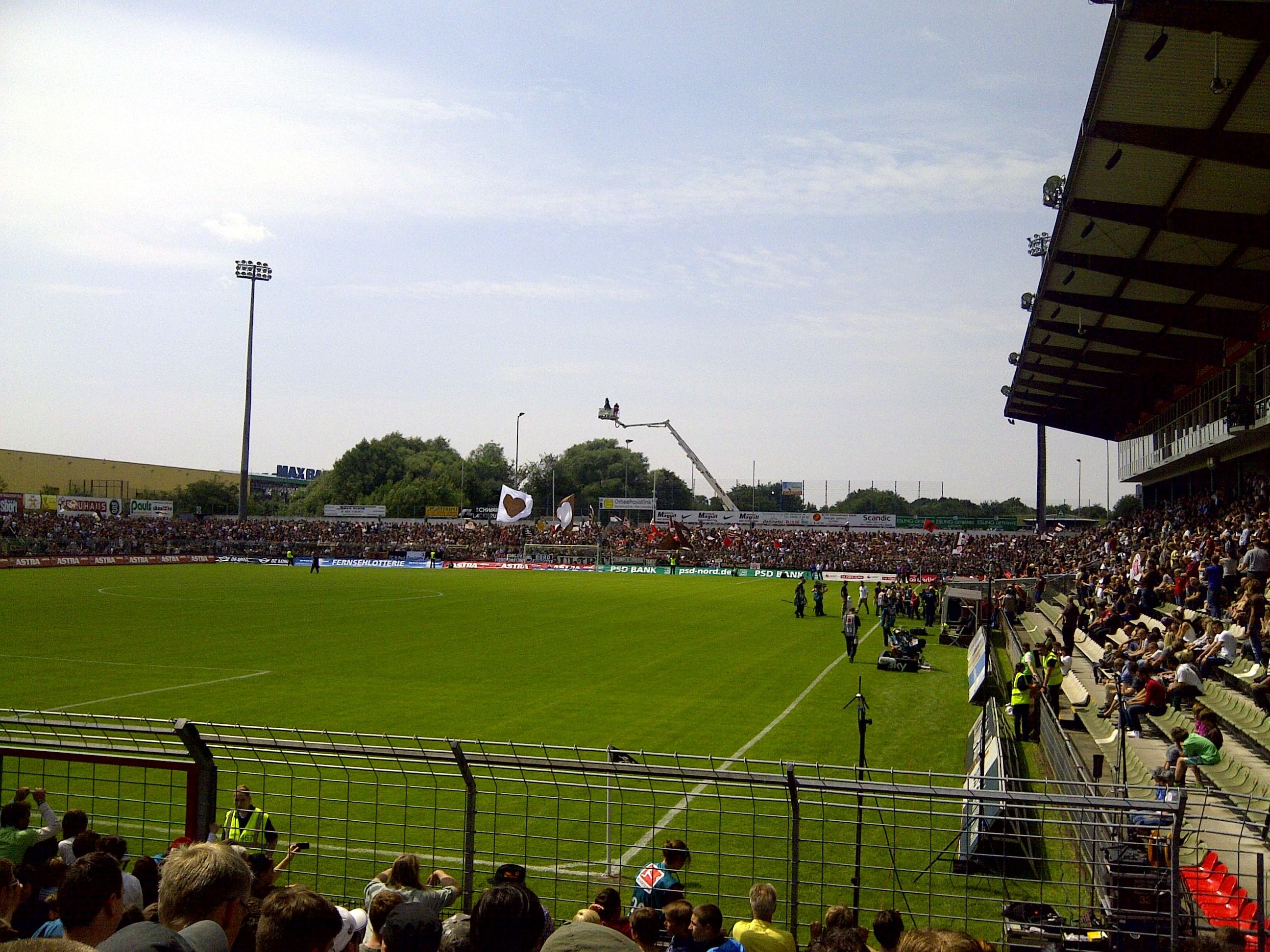
- Lübeck-Lohmühle
- Interactive map of Stadion Lohmühle
- Former names: Adolf-Hitler-Kampfbahn (1933–1945); PokerStars.de-Stadion an der Lohmühle (2011–2013); Dietmar-Scholze-Stadion an der Lohmühle (2020–2021)
- Location: Lübeck, Schleswig-Holstein, Germany
- Capacity: 17,849
- Surface: grass

Construction
- Opened: 1924

Tenant
- VfB Lübeck

The Lohmühle is a football stadium in Lübeck, Germany. It is the home ground of VfB Lübeck, located in the Holstentor Nord district, which is itself part of the larger St. Lorenz Nord area of the city. After the demolition of the old terracing and construction of the new main stand in 1996, a consequence of the club's promotion to the 2. Bundesliga the previous year, the stadium now has a capacity of 17,849 seats, of which about 4,400 are covered. For a considerable period prior to the redevelopment of Kiel's 15,034-seater Holstein-Stadion, the Lohmühle was the largest stadium in Schleswig-Holstein, but due to various restrictions (including fire safety and the requirement for TV and media areas) only around 10,800 seats are currently usable. Between November 2011 and 2013 it was called PokerStars.de-Stadion an der Lohmühle because of a naming rights sponsorship by PokerStars.de.

== History ==
=== History before 1995 ===
The Lohmühle playing field was constructed from 1926 by members of "ATSV-Lübeck" (Workers' Gymnastics and Sports Club of Lübeck), now known as TuS Lübeck 93, and was opened on 12 May 1929. The field had a running track and other athletics facilities but no stands or changing rooms. After the banning of the ATSV in May 1933 by the Nazis, the facilities became the property of the German state, and the venue was renamed as the "Adolf Hitler Arena".

Because the Kasernenhof sports field was claimed by the Wehrmacht at the end of 1934, the Lohmühle became the home ground of SV Polizei Lübeck from November 1934 onwards. The first 472-seater stand, now known as the Alte Holztribüne (Old Wooden Stand), was built by SV Polizei in 1937 for a sum of 42,000 Reichsmarks, and was followed a year later by a covered standing terrace for around 3000 spectators on the then-back straight of the athletics track. The ground's capacity was therefore around 7,000 spectators.

After 1945 and the defeat of Nazism, there was a long-running legal dispute between the newly founded VfB Lübeck, as successors of SV Polizei Lübeck, and ATSV Lübeck, the builders of the original sports field. At first, the stadium was granted to ATSV with a right of use for VfB, but after it was made possible for the ATSV to construct their own ground through pools money and financial help from the city, VfB Lübeck were able to lease the stadium from the city of Lübeck via a hereditary leasehold. The club further expanded the terraces, so that by 25 October 1959's city derby against LBV Phönix, in the Oberliga Nord, the ground was able to hold up to 20,000 spectators.

=== Construction of the new Main Stand ===
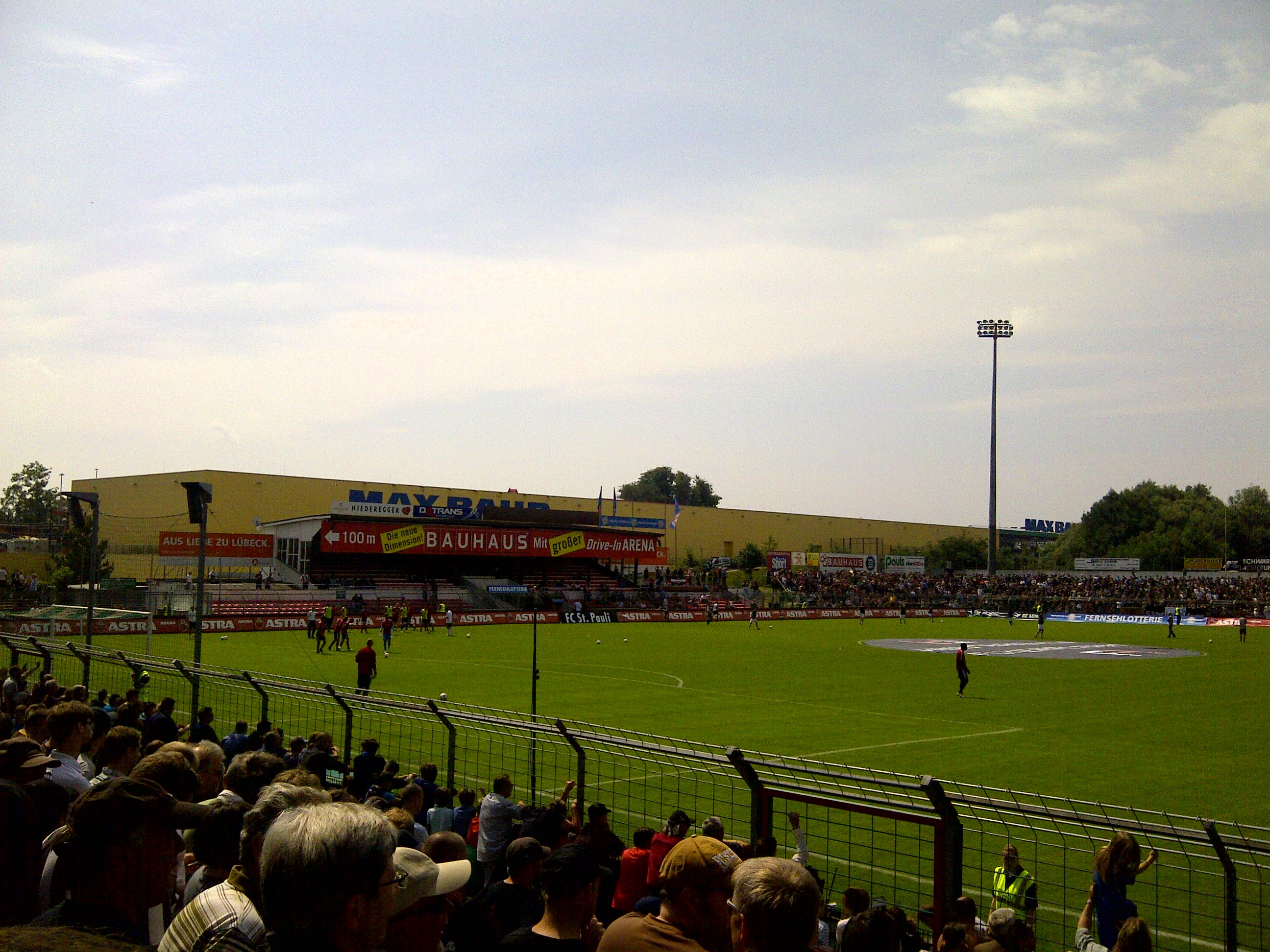
The old main stand on the back straight in July 2011

Until 1995 only small changes were made to the ground, but when VfB Lübeck were promoted to the 2. Bundesliga in 1995 the ground had to comply with stricter requirements. Among other changes, the terrace constructed by SV Polizei was replaced with a new, larger main stand, which contained the club offices, the club shop, changing rooms and (on the top floor) 22 VIP suites, a VIP and Media Room and a restaurant. The former main stand on the back straight is still in use and is now generally known as "Alte Holze" (The Old Wooden One). The changing rooms and facilities inside the Alte Holze are now mainly used by VfB Lübeck's youth teams.

In the summer of 2000, a floodlight was erected, in line with the regulations of the two-tier Regionalliga which the club had newly reached. This met modern TV broadcasting standards and was also compulsory in the 3. Liga. The stadium had previously been floodlit between 1992 and 1995 but this was taken down during the construction of the new main stand.

=== Modernisation since 2019 ===
A new terrace was opened in time for the 2019–20 season. The new block of terracing in the "Pappelkurve", between blocks E and F, was constructed in the course of about six months during the previous season and can hold around 1,400 fans. Next to the new terracing, however, some areas now had an impaired view of the pitch, and couldn't be sold to spectators. About a third of the Alte Holze has to be left empty for fire safety reasons, while space in the main stand has to be left free for TV cameras to use. Consequently, the August 2019 DFB-Pokal game against FC St. Pauli was sold out with only 11,000 spectators present.

After VfB Lübeck's promotion into the 3. Liga for the 2020–21 season – and the associated return to professional football – the Lohmühle again had to be modernised, this time for a six-figure sum. A 40-square-metre digital scoreboard was erected behind the away section, which further reduced the ground's capacity to 10,800 spectators. The Lohmühle was thereby replaced by Holstein Kiel's Holstein-Stadion – which has a capacity of 15,034 – as Schleswig-Holstein's largest football stadium. Because VfB Lübeck were newly promoted, they were given a one-season exemption from the 3. Liga's undersoil heating requirements by the DFB, as a consequence of which home games against Hansa Rostock and 1860 Munich were called off in January and February 2021 respectively. The stadium was also renamed as the Dietmar-Scholze-Stadion an der Lohmühle for the 2020–21 season in honour of Dietmar Scholze, a former president and chairman of the club's board, who had promoted a vision of the club's return to professional football for many years and died in 2019.
