= 1995–96 1. FC Kaiserslautern season =

1. FC Kaiserslautern
1995–96 season
- Manager: Friedel Rausch; Eckhard Krautzun
- Stadium: Fritz-Walter-Stadion
- Bundesliga: 16th (relegated)
- DFB-Pokal: Winners
- UEFA Cup: Second round
- Top goalscorer: Pavel Kuka (10)

== Season summary ==
Kaiserslautern suffered their worst season since the inception of the Bundesliga. A mere two years after coming within a point of winning the title, they were relegated in 16th place. Although they only lost 10 league games all season - as many as runners-up Bayern Munich - they also only won 6 of those remaining 24 games, the second-worst in the division. There was a silver lining to this season, as Kaiserslautern won the DFB-Pokal for only the second time in their history, ensuring a sixth appearance in European competition in the past seven seasons. Otto Rehhagel, recently ousted from Bayern Munich, was given the task of returning Kaiserslautern to the Bundesliga.

== Players ==
=== First team squad ===
Squad at end of season

Note: Flags indicate national team as defined under FIFA eligibility rules; some limited exceptions apply. Players may hold more than one non-FIFA nationality.

No.	Pos.	Nation	Player
1	GK	GER	Andreas Reinke
2	DF	GER	Frank Greiner
4	DF	GER	Axel Roos
5	DF	CZE	Miroslav Kadlec
6	DF	GER	Andreas Brehme
7	FW	GER	Uwe Wegmann
8	MF	GER	Martin Wagner
9	FW	CZE	Pavel Kuka
10	MF	GER	Claus-Dieter Wollitz
11	FW	GER	Olaf Marschall
13	DF	GER	Roger Lutz

No.	Pos.	Nation	Player
14	DF	GER	Mario Kern
15	DF	GER	Thomas Hengen
19	MF	GER	Dirk Flock
20	DF	GER	Oliver Schäfer
21	DF	GER	Harry Koch
22	GK	GER	Gerry Ehrmann
23	MF	GER	Thomas Riedl
24	MF	GER	Marco Reich
25	MF	TUR	Cem Karaca (Note: Karaca was born in Hofheim, West Germany (now Germany), but also qualified to represent Turkey internationally and represented Turkey at U-21 and B level.)
26	DF	GER	Wolfgang Funkel
27	GK	AUS	Mark Schwarzer

=== Left club during season ===
Note: Flags indicate national team as defined under FIFA eligibility rules; some limited exceptions apply. Players may hold more than one non-FIFA nationality.

No.	Pos.	Nation	Player
3	MF	GER	Bernd Hollerbach (to Hamburg)
12	DF	GER	Thomas Ritter (to Karlsruhe)

No.	Pos.	Nation	Player
16	MF	GER	Dirk Anders (to MSV Duisburg)
17	DF	GER	Matthias Hamann (to 1860 Munich)

== Competitions ==
Win Draw Loss Postponed

=== Bundesliga ===
==== League table ====
Pos	Team	Pld	W	D	L	GF	GA	GD	Pts	Qualification or relegation
14	Bayer Leverkusen	34	8	14	12	37	38	−1	38	
15	FC St. Pauli	34	9	11	14	43	51	−8	38	
16	1. FC Kaiserslautern (Note: After being demoted by league place, Kaiserslautern won the DFB-Pokal 1995–96 and thus qualified for the Cup Winners' Cup.) (R)	34	6	18	10	31	37	−6	36	Cup Winners' Cup and relegation to 2. Bundesliga
17	Eintracht Frankfurt (R)	34	7	11	16	43	68	−25	32	Relegation to 2. Bundesliga
18	KFC Uerdingen (R)	34	5	11	18	33	56	−23	26	Relegation to 2. Bundesliga

Source: www.dfb.de
Rules for classification: 1) points; 2) goal difference; 3) number of goals scored.
(R) Relegated
