= 1996–97 Borussia Dortmund season =

1996–97 season of Borussia Dortmund

Borussia Dortmund
1996–97 season
- Manager: Ottmar Hitzfeld
- Bundesliga: 3rd
- DFB-Pokal: First round
- DFB-Supercup: Winners
- UEFA Champions League: Winners
- Top goalscorer: League: Stéphane Chapuisat (13 goals); All: Stéphane Chapuisat (16 goals)
| Home colours | Away colours | Third colours |

During the 1996–97 German football season, Borussia Dortmund competed in the German Bundesliga.

== Season summary ==
Dortmund failed to win a third straight Bundesliga title and finished the season in third, eight points off champions Bayern Munich, but made up for the league disappointment by winning the Champions League for the first time in their history, defeating a Juventus side featuring the likes of Zinedine Zidane, Didier Deschamps and Christian Vieri at the Olympiastadion in Munich.

== Squad ==
Squad at end of season

Note: Flags indicate national team as defined under FIFA eligibility rules; some limited exceptions apply. Players may hold more than one non-FIFA nationality.

| No. | Pos. | Nation | Player |
|---|---|---|---|
| 1 | GK | GER | Stefan Klos |
| 2 | DF | GER | Knut Reinhardt |
| 3 | DF | GER | René Schneider |
| 4 | MF | GER | Steffen Freund |
| 5 | DF | BRA | Júlio César |
| 6 | DF | GER | Matthias Sammer |
| 7 | DF | GER | Stefan Reuter |
| 8 | MF | GER | Michael Zorc |
| 9 | FW | SUI | Stéphane Chapuisat |
| 10 | MF | GER | Andreas Möller |
| 11 | FW | GER | Heiko Herrlich |
| 12 | GK | GER | Wolfgang de Beer |
| 13 | FW | GER | Karl-Heinz Riedle |

| No. | Pos. | Nation | Player |
|---|---|---|---|
| 14 | MF | SCO | Paul Lambert |
| 15 | DF | GER | Jürgen Kohler |
| 16 | DF | GER | Martin Kree |
| 17 | MF | GER | Jörg Heinrich |
| 18 | MF | GER | Lars Ricken |
| 19 | MF | POR | Paulo Sousa |
| 22 | FW | GHA | Ibrahim Tanko |
| 23 | MF | GER | René Tretschok |
| 26 | MF | GER | Frank Riethmann |
| 27 | DF | AUT | Wolfgang Feiersinger |
| 28 | FW | USA | Jovan Kirovski |
| 29 | MF | RUS | Vladimir But |

=== Left club during season ===
Note: Flags indicate national team as defined under FIFA eligibility rules; some limited exceptions apply. Players may hold more than one non-FIFA nationality.

| No. / Pos. / Nation / Player; 20 / DF / GER / Günter Kutowski (to Rot-Weiss Essen) | No. / Pos. / Nation / Player; 21 / MF / GER / Carsten Wolters (to Duisburg) |

== Competitions ==
=== Bundesliga ===
Dortmund came in 3rd in the Bundesliga.

==== League table ====
| Pos | Team | Pld | W | D | L | GF | GA | GD | Pts | Qualification or relegation |
|---|---|---|---|---|---|---|---|---|---|---|
| 1 | Bayern Munich (C) | 34 | 20 | 11 | 3 | 68 | 34 | +34 | 71 | Qualification to Champions League group stage (Note: Borussia Dortmund and Schalke 04 won their respective European competitions in this season, so they qualified as title holders. As a consequence, the original UEFA Cup places of Dortmund and Stuttgart, who qualified for the UEFA Cup Winners' Cup as domestic cup winners, were awarded to Karlsruhe and 1860 Munich; the Intertoto Cup berths of Karlsruhe and 1860 were handed to Köln and Hamburg, as Mönchengladbach did not apply for this competition.) |
| 2 | Bayer Leverkusen | 34 | 21 | 6 | 7 | 69 | 41 | +28 | 69 | Qualification to Champions League second qualifying round |
| 3 | Borussia Dortmund | 34 | 19 | 6 | 9 | 63 | 41 | +22 | 63 | Qualification to Champions League group stage |
| 4 | VfB Stuttgart | 34 | 18 | 7 | 9 | 78 | 40 | +38 | 61 | Qualification to Cup Winners' Cup first round |
| 5 | VfL Bochum | 34 | 14 | 11 | 9 | 54 | 51 | +3 | 53 | Qualification to UEFA Cup first round |

Source: www.dfb.de
Rules for classification: 1) points; 2) goal difference; 3) number of goals scored.
(C) Champions

=== DFB-Pokal ===
| 11 August 1996 Round 1 | SG Wattenscheid 09 | 4–3 (a.e.t.) | Borussia Dortmund | Wattenscheid |
| | Ristau 42'; Dikhtyar 50'; Skok 69'; Bläker 115' | Report | Zorc 14'; Herrlich 75'; Reuter 88' | Stadium: Lohrheidestadion; Attendance: 9,600; Referee: Michael Malbranc (Hamburg) |

=== DFB-Supercup ===
3 August 1996
18:30 CEST

| Borussia Dortmund | 1–1 (a.e.t.) | 1. FC Kaiserslautern |
|---|---|---|
| Wolters 66' | Report | Marschall 55' |
Penalties
| Reuter (penalty missed); Möller (penalty missed); Chapuisat (penalty scored); But (penalty scored); Zorc (penalty scored); Weiland (penalty scored) | 4–3 | (penalty scored) Wagner; (penalty scored) Kuka; (penalty scored) Schäfer; (penalty missed) Ratinho; (penalty missed) Lutz; (penalty missed) Roos |

Carl-Benz-Stadion, Mannheim
Attendance: 22,000
Referee: Hans-Peter Best (Kämpfelbach-Bilfingen)

| Borussia Dortmund | 1. FC Kaiserslautern |

| GK | 1 | (Germany) Stefan Klos |
| SW | 6 | (Germany) Matthias Sammer | (substituted off) 91' |
| CB | 15 | (Germany) Jürgen Kohler | (substituted off) 60' |
| CB | 17 | (Germany) Jörg Heinrich |
| DM | 21 | (Germany) Carsten Wolters |
| RM | 7 | (Germany) Stefan Reuter |
| CM | 8 | (Germany) Michael Zorc (c) |
| CM | 10 | (Germany) Andreas Möller |
| LM | 24 | (Germany) Dennis Weiland |
| CF | 9 | (Switzerland) Stéphane Chapuisat |
| CF | 18 | (Germany) Lars Ricken | (substituted off) 71' |
Substitutes:
| DF | 20 | (Germany) Günter Kutowski | (substituted on) 60' |
| MF | 29 | (Russia) Vladimir But | (substituted on) 71' |
| MF | 27 | (Germany) Dennis Vogt | (substituted on) 91' |
Manager:
(Germany) Ottmar Hitzfeld

| GK | 1 | (Germany) Andreas Reinke |
| SW | 6 | (Germany) Andreas Brehme | (substituted off) 99' |
| CB | 24 | (Germany) Harry Koch |
| CB | 20 | (Germany) Roger Lutz |
| RWB | 2 | (Germany) Frank Greiner |
| LWB | 8 | (Germany) Martin Wagner |
| CM | 4 | (Germany) Axel Roos |
| CM | 19 | (Germany) Oliver Schäfer |
| CM | 7 | (Germany) Uwe Wegmann | (substituted off) 91' |
| CF | 11 | (Germany) Olaf Marschall (c) | (substituted off) 91' |
| CF | 9 | (Czech Republic) Pavel Kuka |
Substitutes:
| MF | 17 | (Brazil) Ratinho | (substituted on) 91' |
| FW | 18 | (Germany) Jürgen Rische | (substituted on) 91' |
| MF | 12 | (Germany) Andreas Broß | (substituted on) 99' |
Manager:
(Germany) Otto Rehhagel

=== UEFA Champions League ===
Dortmund won the UEFA Champions League.

=== Group stage ===
| Pos | Team | Pld | W | D | L | GF | GA | GD | Pts | Qualification |
|---|---|---|---|---|---|---|---|---|---|---|
| 1 | (Spain) Atlético Madrid | 6 | 4 | 1 | 1 | 12 | 4 | +8 | 13 | Advance to knockout stage |
| 2 | (Germany) Borussia Dortmund | 6 | 4 | 1 | 1 | 14 | 8 | +6 | 13 | Advance to knockout stage |
| 3 | (Poland) Widzew Łódź | 6 | 1 | 1 | 4 | 6 | 10 | −4 | 4 | |
| 4 | (Romania) Steaua București | 6 | 1 | 1 | 4 | 5 | 15 | −10 | 4 | |

Source: UEFA

| Team 1 | Score | Team 2 |
|---|---|---|
| Borussia Dortmund (Germany) | 2–1 | (Poland) Widzew Łódź |
| Steaua București (Romania) | 0–3 | (Germany) Borussia Dortmund |
| Atlético Madrid (Spain) | 0–1 | (Germany) Borussia Dortmund |
| Borussia Dortmund (Germany) | 1–2 | (Spain) Atlético Madrid |
| Widzew Łódź (Poland) | 2–2 | (Germany) Borussia Dortmund |
| Borussia Dortmund (Germany) | 5–3 | (Romania) Steaua București |

=== Knockout stage ===
==== Quarter-finals ====
| Team 1 | Agg. | Team 2 | 1st leg | 2nd leg |
|---|---|---|---|---|
| Borussia Dortmund (Germany) | 4–1 | (France) Auxerre | 3–1 | 1–0 |

==== Semi-finals ====
| Team 1 | Agg. | Team 2 | 1st leg | 2nd leg |
|---|---|---|---|---|
| Borussia Dortmund (Germany) | 2–0 | (England) Manchester United | 1–0 | 1–0 |

==== Final ====
28 May 1997
20:30 UTC+2

| Borussia Dortmund (Germany) | 3–1 | (Italy) Juventus |
|---|---|---|
| Riedle 29', 34'; Ricken 71' | Report | Del Piero 65' |

Olympiastadion, Munich
Attendance: 59,000
Referee: Sándor Puhl (Hungary)

== Kits ==
| Home | Home CL | Away | Away CL | CL Final |
