= 1997–98 1. FC Kaiserslautern season =

1. FC Kaiserslautern
1997–98 season
- Manager: Otto Rehhagel
- Stadium: Fritz-Walter-Stadion
- Bundesliga: 1st
- DFB-Pokal: Round of 16
- Top goalscorer: League: Olaf Marschall (21 goals); All: Olaf Marschall (23 goals)
- Average home league attendance: 38,000
- Biggest win: 5–0 v. Kaiserslautern II (A); 16 August 1997
- Biggest defeat: 0-3 v. Bayer Leverkusen (H); 28 March 1998

== Season summary ==
Kaiserslautern started their season with a shock 1–0 win at reigning champions Bayern Munich, and followed this with a 1–0 victory against Hertha BSC that left them top of the table. From the fourth matchday onwards Kaiserslautern would not relinquish first place. By the beginning of the second half of the season Kaiserslautern were four points clear of Bayern, a lead increased to seven points after completing the double over the Bavarians. Bayern continued to falter and Kaiserslautern confirmed their second-ever Bundesliga title with a 4–0 victory over Wolfsburg in the penultimate round. This is the only time in Bundesliga history that a newly promoted side has won the title – the closest any team has come to repeating this feat was RB Leipzig's second place in 2016–17.

== Players ==
=== First-team squad ===
Squad at end of season

Note: Flags indicate national team as defined under FIFA eligibility rules; some limited exceptions apply. Players may hold more than one non-FIFA nationality.

No.	Pos.	Nation	Player
1	GK	GER	Andreas Reinke
3	MF	GER	Michael Ballack
4	DF	GER	Axel Roos
5	DF	CZE	Miroslav Kadlec
6	DF	GER	Andreas Brehme
7	MF	BUL	Marian Hristov
8	MF	GER	Martin Wagner
9	FW	CZE	Pavel Kuka
10	MF	SUI	Ciriaco Sforza
11	FW	GER	Olaf Marschall
12	MF	GER	Stefan Ertl
13	DF	GER	Roger Lutz

No.	Pos.	Nation	Player
15	DF	HUN	János Hrutka
16	DF	DEN	Michael Schjønberg
17	MF	BRA	Ratinho
18	FW	GER	Jürgen Rische
19	DF	GER	Oliver Schäfer
22	MF	GER	Andreas Buck
23	MF	GER	Thomas Riedl
24	DF	GER	Harry Koch
25	GK	HUN	Lajos Szűcs
26	MF	NGR	Pascal Ojigwe
27	MF	GER	Marco Reich
30	MF	GER	Thomas Franck
—	MF	GER	Dietmar Hamann

=== Left club during season ===
Note: Flags indicate national team as defined under FIFA eligibility rules; some limited exceptions apply. Players may hold more than one non-FIFA nationality.

No. / Pos. / Nation / Player; 2 / DF / GER / Frank Greiner (to Wolfsburg)	No. / Pos. / Nation / Player; 30 / GK / CZE / Petr Kouba (to Viktoria Žižkov)

== Competitions ==
Win Draw Loss Postponed

=== Overall record ===
Competition	First match	Last match	Starting round	Final position	Record							
Competition	First match	Last match	Starting round	Final position	Pld	W	D	L	GF	GA	GD	Win %
Bundesliga	2 August 1997	9 May 1998	Matchday 1	Winners	34	19	11	4	63	39	+24	55.88
DFB-Pokal	16 August 1997	28 October 1997	First round	Round of 16	3	2	0	1	10	2	+8	66.67
Total					37	21	11	5	73	41	+32	56.76

Source: Competitions

=== Bundesliga ===
==== League table ====
Pos	Team	Pld	W	D	L	GF	GA	GD	Pts	Qualification or relegation
1	1. FC Kaiserslautern (C)	34	19	11	4	63	39	+24	68	Qualification to Champions League group stage
2	Bayern Munich	34	19	9	6	69	37	+32	66	Qualification to Champions League second qualifying round
3	Bayer Leverkusen	34	14	13	7	66	39	+27	55	Qualification to UEFA Cup first round
4	VfB Stuttgart	34	14	10	10	55	49	+6	52	Qualification to UEFA Cup first round
5	Schalke 04	34	13	13	8	38	32	+6	52	Qualification to UEFA Cup first round

Source: www.dfb.de
Rules for classification: 1) points; 2) goal difference; 3) number of goals scored.
(C) Champions

==== Matches ====
2 August 1997 1	Bayern Munich	0–1	Kaiserslautern	Munich
15:30			Schjönberg 80'	Stadium: Munich Olympic Stadium; Attendance: 63,000; Referee: Lutz-Michael Fröhlich

6 August 1997 2	Kaiserslautern	1–0	Hertha BSC	Kaiserslautern
20:00	Marschall 75'			Stadium: Fritz-Walter-Stadion; Attendance: 38,000; Referee: Jürgen Jansen

9 August 1997 3	Köln	0–0	Kaiserslautern	Cologne
15:30				Stadium: Müngersdorfer Stadion; Attendance: 36,000; Referee: Winfried Buchhart

23 August 1997 4	Kaiserslautern	3–0	Schalke 04	Kaiserslautern
15:30	Marschall 32', 63'; Sforza 40'			Stadium: Fritz-Walter-Stadion; Attendance: 38,000; Referee: Hermann Albrecht

29 August 1997 5	VfL Bochum	1–3	Kaiserslautern	Bochum
20:00	Stickroth 68' (pen.)		Kuka 19', 90'; Marschall 72'	Stadium: Ruhrstadion; Attendance: 28,600; Referee: Wolfgang Stark

14 September 1997 6	Kaiserslautern	4–3	VfB Stuttgart	Kaiserslautern
18:00	Marschall 20', 58', 80'; Ratinho 55'		Bobic 14'; Akpoborie 36'; Raducioiu 90'	Stadium: Fritz-Walter-Stadion; Attendance: 38,000; Referee: Jürgen Aust

19 September 1997 7	Karlsruher SC	2–4	Kaiserslautern	Karlsruhe
20:00	Häßler 50'; Keller 57'		Ratinho 17'; Wagner 23' (pen.); Kuka 52'; Reich 90'	Stadium: Wildparkstadion; Attendance: 33,000; Referee: Hellmut Krug

27 September 1997 8	Kaiserslautern	1–3	Werder Bremen	Kaiserslautern
15:30	Marschall 6'		Labbadia 56'; Flo 85'; Frey 89'	Stadium: Fritz-Walter-Stadion; Attendance: 38,000; Referee: Bernhard Zerr

3 October 1997 9	1860 Munich	1–3	Kaiserslautern	Munich
20:00	Winkler 14'		Marschall 22', 84'; Sforza 34'	Stadium: Munich Olympic Stadium; Attendance: 62,000; Referee: Hartmut Strampe

15 October 1997 10	Kaiserslautern	3–1	Arminia Bielefeld	Kaiserslautern
20:00	Rische 18', 66'; Kadlec 32'		Kuntz 38'	Stadium: Fritz-Walter-Stadion; Attendance: 38,000; Referee: Lutz Wagner

18 October 1997 11	Bayer Leverkusen	1–1	Kaiserslautern	Leverkusen
15:30	Happe 72'		Rische 86'	Stadium: BayArena; Attendance: 22,500; Referee: Hermann Albrecht

24 October 1997 12	Kaiserslautern	1–0	MSV Duisburg	Kaiserslautern
20:00	Marschall 21'			Stadium: Fritz-Walter-Stadion; Attendance: 38,000; Referee: Lutz-Michael Fröhlich

31 October 1997 13	Borussia Dortmund	2–2	Kaiserslautern	Dortmund
20:00	Freund 1'; Heinrich 30'		Marschall 41', 76'	Stadium: Westfalenstadion; Attendance: 55,000; Referee: Bernd Heynemann

7 November 1997 14	Kaiserslautern	4–3	Hansa Rostock	Kaiserslautern
20:00	Sforza 2'; Rische 38', 83'; Schjönberg 47'		Barbarez 8'; Dowe 18'; Neuville 67'	Stadium: Fritz-Walter-Stadion; Attendance: 38,000; Referee: Georg Dardenne

19 November 1997 15	Borussia Mönchengladbach	1–3	1. FC Kaiserslautern	Mönchengladbach
20:00	Andersson 65'		Buck 29'; Kuka 49'; Rische 76'	Stadium: Bökelbergstadion; Attendance: 26,300; Referee: Wolfgang Stark

22 November 1997 16	VfL Wolfsburg	2–1	Kaiserslautern	Wolfsburg
15:30	Spies 25'; Keller 81'		Wagner 65'	Stadium: VfL-Stadion am Elsterweg; Attendance: 20,112; Referee: Hellmut Krug

29 November 1997 17	Kaiserslautern	2–1	Hamburger SV	Kaiserslautern
15:30	Ratinho 75'; Hristov 90'		Salihamidžić 58'	Stadium: Fritz-Walter-Stadion; Attendance: 38,000; Referee: Winfried Buchhart

5 December 1997 18	Kaiserslautern	2–0	Bayern Munich	Kaiserslautern
20:00	Hamann 44'; Hristov 85'			Stadium: Fritz-Walter-Stadion; Attendance: 38,000; Referee: Lutz-Michael Fröhlich

12 December 1997 19	Hertha BSC	2–0	Kaiserslautern	Berlin
20:00	Karl 2'; Preetz 72'			Stadium: Berlin Olympic Stadium; Attendance: 61,445; Referee: Markus Weber

20 December 1997 20	Kaiserslautern	3–2	Köln	Kaiserslautern
15:30	Hristov 24'; Riedl 59'; Schjönberg 82'		Munteanu 45'; Polster 75'	Stadium: Fritz-Walter-Stadion; Attendance: 38,000; Referee: Bernd Heynemann

31 January 1998 21	Schalke 04	1–1	Kaiserslautern	Gelsenkirchen
15:30	van Hoogdalem 58'		Hristov 9'	Stadium: Parkstadion; Attendance: 51,600; Referee: Winfried Buchhart

6 February 1998 22	Kaiserslautern	3–0	VfL Bochum	Kaiserslautern
20:00	Wagner 32'; Rische 45', 82'			Stadium: Fritz-Walter-Stadion; Attendance: 38,000; Referee: Uwe Kemmling

14 February 1998 23	VfB Stuttgart	0–1	Kaiserslautern	Stuttgart
15:30			Hristov 81'	Stadium: Gottlieb-Daimler-Stadion; Attendance: 53,000; Referee: Hermann Albrecht

27 February 1998 24	Kaiserslautern	0–0	Karlsruher SC	Kaiserslautern
20:00				Stadium: Fritz-Walter-Stadion; Attendance: 38,000; Referee: Georg Dardenne

8 March 1997 25	Werder Bremen	1–1	Kaiserslautern	Bremen
20:00	Pfeifenberger 14'		Schjönberg 35' (pen.)	Stadium: Weserstadion; Attendance: 34,804; Referee: Markus Weber

14 March 1998 26	Kaiserslautern	1–0	1860 Munich	Kaiserslautern
15:30	Ratinho 45'			Stadium: Fritz-Walter-Stadion; Attendance: 38,000; Referee: Hartmut Strampe

29 April 1998 27	Arminia Bielefeld	2–2	Kaiserslautern	Bielefeld
20:00	Daei 35', 64'		Marschall 24'; Rische 87'	Stadium: Stadion Alm; Attendance: 22,512; Referee: Jörg Keßler

28 March 1998 28	Kaiserslautern	0–3	Bayer Leverkusen	Kaiserslautern
15:30			Beinlich 61'; Rink 78'; Kirsten 90'	Stadium: Fritz-Walter-Stadion; Attendance: 38,000; Referee: Bernhard Zerr

3 April 1998 29	MSV Duisburg	1–1	Kaiserslautern	Duisburg
20:00	Hajto 65'		Marschall 40'	Stadium: Wedaustadion; Attendance: 19,941; Referee: Torsten Koop

9 April 1998 30	Kaiserslautern	1–1	Borussia Dortmund	Kaiserslautern
20:00	Kuka 80'		Freund 69'	Stadium: Fritz-Walter-Stadion; Attendance: 38,000; Referee: Wolfgang Stark

18 April 1998 31	Hansa Rostock	2–2	Kaiserslautern	Rostock
15:30	Barbarez 1'; Dowe 46'		Rische 20'; Gansauge 69' (o.g.)	Stadium: Ostseestadion; Attendance: 24,500; Referee: Jürgen Aust

24 April 1998 32	Kaiserslautern	3–2	Borussia Mönchengladbach	Kaiserslautern
20:00	Marschall 45', 61', 90+1'		Hausweiler 16'; Pettersson 43'	Stadium: Fritz-Walter-Stadion; Attendance: 38,000; Referee: Bernd Heynemann

2 May 1998 33	Kaiserslautern	4–0	VfL Wolfsburg	Kaiserslautern
15:30	Marschall 24', 55'; Wagner 52'; Rische 88'			Stadium: Fritz-Walter-Stadion; Attendance: 38,000; Referee: Jürgen Jansen

9 May 1998 34	Hamburger SV	1–1	Kaiserslautern	Hamburg
15:30	Dembiński 50'		Marschall 88' (pen.)	Stadium: Volksparkstadion; Attendance: 58,000; Referee: Hellmut Krug

=== DFB-Pokal ===
16 August 1997 First round	Kaiserslautern II	0–5	Kaiserslautern	Fritz-Walter-Stadion, Kaiserslautern
15:30			Marschall 17'; Rische 31'; Kuka 73', 81'; Ratinho 78'	Attendance: 11,000; Referee: Stephan Kammerer

24 September 1997 Second round	1. FC Saarbrücken	0–4	Kaiserslautern	Ludwigsparkstadion, Saarbrücken
19:30			Marschall 2'; Trautmann 7' (o.g.); Reich 52'; Rische 61'	Attendance: 33,000; Referee: Hans-Jürgen Weber

28 October 1997 Round of 16	Kaiserslautern	1–2	Bayern Munich	Fritz-Walter-Stadion, Kaiserslautern
20:30	Sforza 25'		Nerlinger 3'; Jancker 75'	Attendance: 38,000; Referee: Jürgen Jansen
