= 1996 DFB-Pokal final =

- Match programme cover
- Event: 1995–96 DFB-Pokal
Karlsruher SC	1. FC Kaiserslautern
0	1
- Date: 25 May 1996
- Venue: Olympiastadion, Berlin
- Referee: Hellmut Krug (Gelsenkirchen)
- Attendance: 75,800

The 1996 DFB-Pokal final decided the winner of the 1995–96 DFB-Pokal, the 53rd season of Germany's premier knockout football cup competition. It was played on 25 May 1996 at the Olympiastadion in Berlin. 1. FC Kaiserslautern won the match 1–0 against Karlsruher SC to claim their second cup title, qualifying for the 1996–97 UEFA Cup Winners' Cup and the 1996 DFB-Supercup.

== Route to the final ==
The DFB-Pokal was a 64 teams in a single-elimination knockout cup competition. There were a total of five rounds leading up to the final. Teams were drawn against each other, and the winner after 90 minutes would advance. If still tied, 30 minutes of extra time was played. If the score was still level, a penalty shoot-out was used to determine the winner.

Note: In all results below, the score of the finalist is given first (H: home; A: away).

Karlsruher SC		Round	1. FC Kaiserslautern
Opponent	Result	1995–96 DFB-Pokal	Opponent	Result
Tennis Borussia Berlin (A)	2–1	Round 1	Fortuna Köln (A)	4–3 (a.e.t.)
Sachsen Leipzig (A)	2–0	Round 2	SG Wattenscheid (H)	3–0
SpVgg Unterhaching (A)	3–2	Round of 16	Schalke 04 (H)	1–0
Borussia Dortmund (A)	3–1	Quarter-finals	FC Homburg (A)	4–3
Fortuna Düsseldorf (H)	2–0	Semi-finals	Bayer Leverkusen (H)	1–0

== Match ==
=== Details ===
25 May 1996
19:00 CEST

Karlsruher SC	0–1	1. FC Kaiserslautern
	Report	Wagner 42'

Olympiastadion, Berlin
Attendance: 75,800
Referee: Hellmut Krug (Gelsenkirchen)

Karlsruher SC	1. FC Kaiserslautern

GK	1	(Germany) Claus Reitmaier
SW	16	(Germany) Jens Nowotny
CB	7	(Germany) Dirk Schuster
CB	6	(Germany) Thomas Ritter		(substituted off) 82'
RWB	2	(Germany) Gunther Metz		(substituted off) 73'
LWB	21	(Germany) Michael Tarnat	Booked
CM	5	(Germany) Manfred Bender
CM	8	(Germany) Thorsten Fink
AM	10	(Germany) Thomas Häßler (c)
CF	9	(Switzerland) Adrian Knup
CF	12	(Germany) Sean Dundee
Substitutes:
GK	22	(Germany) Thomas Walter
DF	4	(Germany) Michael Wittwer
DF	19	(Germany) Raphael Krauss
MF	14	(Germany) Eberhard Carl	Booked	(substituted in) 82'
FW	18	(Germany) Edgar Schmitt		(substituted in) 73'
Manager:
(Germany) Winfried Schäfer

GK	1	(Germany) Andreas Reinke
SW	5	(Czech Republic) Miroslav Kadlec
CB	20	(Germany) Oliver Schäfer
CB	24	(Germany) Harry Koch
RWB	2	(Germany) Frank Greiner
LWB	8	(Germany) Martin Wagner	Booked
DM	4	(Germany) Axel Roos		(substituted off) 82'
CM	15	(Germany) Thomas Hengen
CM	6	(Germany) Andreas Brehme (c)	(yellow card) (yellow-red card) 72'
CF	9	(Czech Republic) Pavel Kuka		(substituted off) 87'
CF	11	(Germany) Olaf Marschall		(substituted off) 75'
Substitutes:
GK	22	(Germany) Gerald Ehrmann
DF	13	(Germany) Roger Lutz		(substituted in) 75'
MF	7	(Germany) Uwe Wegmann		(substituted in) 82'
MF	10	(Germany) Claus-Dieter Wollitz		(substituted in) 87'
FW	18	(Germany) Jürgen Rische
Manager:
(Germany) Eckhard Krautzun

Match rules

- 90 minutes.
- 30 minutes of extra time if necessary.
- Penalty shoot-out if scores still level.
- Maximum of three substitutions.
