= 1993–94 1. FC Kaiserslautern season =

1. FC Kaiserslautern
1993–94 season
- Manager: Friedel Rausch
- Stadium: Fritz-Walter-Stadion
- Bundesliga: 2nd
- DFB-Pokal: Quarter-finals
- Top goalscorer: League: Stefan Kuntz (18 goals); All: Stefan Kuntz (20 goals)
- Highest home attendance: 40,500
- Average home league attendance: 34,374
- Biggest win: 7–1 v. MSV Duisburg (H); 10 April 1994
- Biggest defeat: 4–0 v. Bayern Munich (A); 30 October 1993

In the 1993–94 season, Kaiserslautern participated in the Bundesliga and the DFB-Pokal, ending up in second place in the league with 43 points, narrowly losing to Bayern Munich. They reached the quarter-finals of the DFB-Pokal, losing to Werder Bremen on penalties. Stefan Kuntz was this season's Bundesliga top scorer, along with Eintracht Frankfurt striker Tony Yeboah, both scoring 18 goals.

== Squad ==
Note: Flags indicate national team as defined under FIFA eligibility rules; some limited exceptions apply. Players may hold more than one non-FIFA nationality.

Pos.	Nation	Player
GK	GER	Gerald Ehrmann
GK	GER	Claus Reitmaier
DF	GER	Andreas Brehme
DF	SWE	Jan Eriksson
DF	GER	Wolfgang Funkel
DF	GER	Thomas Hengen
DF	CZE	Miroslav Kadlec
DF	GER	Michael Lutsch
DF	GER	Roger Lutz
DF	GER	Thomas Ritter
DF	GER	Alex Roos
DF	GER	Oliver Schäfer
MF	DEN	Bjarne Goldbaek
MF	GER	Marco Haber

Pos.	Nation	Player
MF	GER	Torsten Lieberknecht
MF	SUI	Ciriaco Sforza
MF	GER	Martin Wagner
MF	GER	Michael Zeyer
FW	GER	Jürgen Degen
FW	GER	Marco Dittgen
FW	GER	Uwe Fuchs
FW	CZE	Pavel Kuka
FW	GER	Stefan Kuntz
FW	GER	Marcus Marin

== Competitions ==
=== Bundesliga ===
==== League table ====
Pos	Team	Pld	W	D	L	GF	GA	GD	Pts	Qualification or relegation
1	Bayern Munich (C)	34	17	10	7	68	37	+31	44	Qualification to Champions League group stage
2	1. FC Kaiserslautern	34	18	7	9	64	36	+28	43	Qualification to UEFA Cup first round
3	Bayer Leverkusen	34	14	11	9	60	47	+13	39	Qualification to UEFA Cup first round
4	Borussia Dortmund	34	15	9	10	49	45	+4	39	Qualification to UEFA Cup first round
5	Eintracht Frankfurt	34	15	8	11	57	41	+16	38	Qualification to UEFA Cup first round

Source: www.dfb.de
Rules for classification: 1) points; 2) goal difference; 3) number of goals scored.
(C) Champions

==== Matches ====
7 August 1993 1	Köln	0-2	Kaiserslautern	Müngersdorfer Stadion, Cologne
15:30			Sforza 60'; Marin 89'	Attendance: 37,000; Referee: Hermann Albrecht

14 August 1993 2	Kaiserslautern	4-2	Borussia Mönchengladbach	Fritz-Walter-Stadion, Kaiserslautern
15:30	Fuchs 5', 37'; Kuntz 58'; Eriksson 66'		Neun 29'; Pflipsen 46'	Attendance: 35,459; Referee: Aron Schmidhuber

21 August 1993 3	Eintracht Frankfurt	1-0	Kaiserslautern	Waldstadion, Frankfurt
15:30	Yeboah 16'			Attendance: 32,000; Referee: Hans-Jürgen Weber

28 August 1993 4	Kaiserslautern	2-3	Werder Bremen	Fritz-Walter-Stadion, Kaiserslautern
15:30	Eriksson 72'; Kadlec 88'		Borowka 42'; Herzog 75'; Wolter 84'	Attendance: 32,173; Referee: Eugen Strigel

31 August 1993 5	Kaiserslautern	3-1	Nürnberg	Fritz-Walter-Stadion, Kaiserslautern
20:00	Sforza 48'; Kuntz 81', 85' (pen.)		Zárate 90' (pen.)	Attendance: 30,731; Referee: Karl-Josef Assenmacher

3 September 1993 6	Karlsruhe	1-1	Kaiserslautern	Wildparkstadion, Karlsruhe
20:00	Schmitt 78'		Marin 19'	Attendance: 28,000; Referee: Lutz Michael Fröhlich

8 September 1993 7	Kaiserslautern	0-0	Schalke 04	Fritz-Walter-Stadion, Kaiserslautern
20:00				Attendance: 35,000; Referee: Manfred Amerell

17 September 1993 8	Freiburg	2-3	Kaiserslautern	Dreisamstadion, Freiburg
19:30	Cardoso 52' (pen.); Todt 72'		Ritter 23'; Kadlec 66'; Kuntz 80'	Attendance: 15,000; Referee: Georg Dardenne

25 September 1993 9	Kaiserslautern	3-2	Bayer Leverkusen	Fritz-Walter-Stadion, Kaiserslautern
15:30	Kuntz 26', 48'; Wagner 31'		Thom 16', 61'	Attendance: 30,375; Referee: Günther Habermann

1 October 1993 10	Dynamo Dresden	3-1	Kaiserslautern	Rudolf-Harbig-Stadion, Dresden
20:00	Marschall 1'; Kranz 38'; Schmäler 62'		Kuntz 14'	Attendance: 16,500; Referee: Manfred Führer

9 October 1993 11	Kaiserslautern	5-0	VfB Stuttgart	Fritz-Walter-Stadion, Kaiserslautern
15:30	Kuntz 18', 28', 80' (pen.); Eriksson 38'; Marin 75'			Attendance: 33,754; Referee: Hans-Jürgen Weber

17 October 1993 12	Leipzig	0-0	Kaiserslautern	Zentralstadion, Leipzig
18:30				Attendance: 11,200; Referee: Bernhard Zerr

22 October 1993 13	Kaiserslautern	2-0	MSV Duisburg	Fritz-Walter-Stadion, Kaiserslautern
20:00	Sforza 11'; Kadlec 85'			Attendance: 38,500; Referee: Hermann Albrecht

30 October 1993 14	Bayern Munich	4-0	Kaiserslautern	Olympiastadion, Munich
15:30	Ziege 16'; Valencia 29', 59'; Matthäus 68' (pen.)			Attendance: 58,000; Referee: Bernd Heynemann

5 November 1993 15	Kaiserslautern	4-1	Wattenscheid 09	Fritz-Walter-Stadion, Kaiserslautern
20:00	Kadlec 26'; Roos 55'; Sforza 81'; Kuntz 83'		Buckmaier 41'	Attendance: 29,182; Referee: Wieland Ziller

12 November 1993 16	Borussia Dortmund	2-1	Kaiserslautern	Westfalenstadion, Dortmund
20:00	Zorc 17'; Schulz 87'		Kuntz 10'	Attendance: 42,800; Referee: Hans Fux

20 November 1993 17	Kaiserslautern	3-0	Hamburger SV	Fritz-Walter-Stadion, Kaiserslautern
15:30	Sforza 33'; Kadlec 35'; Kuntz 39'			Attendance: 34,621; Referee: Aron Schmidhuber

26 November 1993 18	Kaiserslautern	3-0	Köln	Fritz-Walter-Stadion, Kaiserslautern
20:00	Kuntz 32'; Wagner 34'; Fuchs 69'			Attendance: 32,511; Referee: Hans-Jürgen Kasper

3 December 1993 19	Borussia Mönchengladbach	3-1	Kaiserslautern	Bökelbergstadion, Mönchengladbach
20:00	Kastenmaier 57' (pen.); Pflipsen 72'; Wynhoff 82'		Haber 84'	Attendance: 27,000; Referee: Hans-Peter Best

11 December 1993 20	Kaiserslautern	1-1	Eintracht Frankfurt	Fritz-Walter-Stadion, Kaiserslautern
15:30	Kuntz 2'		Binz 18'	Attendance: 37,711; Referee: Jürgen Aust

12 February 1994 21	Werder Bremen	2-0	Kaiserslautern	Weserstadion, Bremen
15:30	Bratseth 1'; Bode 18'			Attendance: 19,526; Referee: Hans-Jürgen Weber

19 February 1994 22	Nürnberg	0-2	Kaiserslautern	Frankenstadion, Nuremberg
15:30			Kuntz 24'; Degen 72'	Attendance: 27,000; Referee: Georg Dardenne

26 February 1994 23	Kaiserslautern	0-0	Karlsruhe	Fritz-Walter-Stadion, Kaiserslautern
15:30				Attendance: 37,192; Referee: Karl-Josef Assenmacher

5 March 1994 24	Schalke 04	2-0	Kaiserslautern	Parkstadion, Gelsenkirchen
15:30	Sendscheid 71'; Mulder 80'			Attendance: 42,690; Referee: Manfred Schmidt

12 March 1994 25	Kaiserslautern	1-0	Freiburg	Fritz-Walter-Stadion, Kaiserslautern
15:30	Wagner 41'			Attendance: 35,261; Referee: Manfred Führer

19 March 1994 26	Bayer Leverkusen	3-2	Kaiserslautern	Ulrich-Haberland-Stadion, Leverkusen
15:30	Foda 27' (pen.); Wörns 63'; Paulo Sérgio 72'		Brehme 36' (pen.); Kuka 86'	Attendance: 16,700; Referee: Manfred Amerell

25 March 1994 27	Kaiserslautern	0-0	Dynamo Dresden	Fritz-Walter-Stadion, Kaiserslautern
20:00				Attendance: 32,373; Referee: Hellmut Krug

31 March 1994 28	Stuttgart	1-1	Kaiserslautern	Neckarstadion, Stuttgart
20:00	Knup 9'		Kadlec 21'	Attendance: 36,000; Referee: Jürgen Jansen

5 April 1994 29	Kaiserslautern	1-0	Leipzig	Fritz-Walter-Stadion, Kaiserslautern
20:00	Sforza 88'			Attendance: 30,511; Referee: Eugen Strigel

10 April 1994 30	MSV Duisburg	1-7	Kaiserslautern	Wedaustadion, Duisburg
18:00	Közle 62'		Wagner 9'; Kuka 50', 58', 87'; Brehme 60' (pen.), 69' (pen.); Roos 86'	Attendance: 24,100; Referee: Hans Fux

14 April 1994 31	Kaiserslautern	4-0	Bayern Munich	Fritz-Walter-Stadion, Kaiserslautern
20:00	Wagner 58'; Kuka 65', 89'; Sforza 85'			Attendance: 40,000; Referee: Manfred Harder

22 April 1994 32	SG Wattenscheid 09	0-2	Kaiserslautern	Lohrheidestadion, Bochum
19:30			Sforza 86'; Hengen 90'	Attendance: 13,000; Referee: Wolf-Günter Wiesel

30 April 1994 33	Kaiserslautern	2-0	Borussia Dortmund	Fritz-Walter-Stadion, Kaiserslautern
15:30	Kuntz 18' (pen.); Kuka 71'			Attendance: 40,500; Referee: Lutz Michael Fröhlich

7 May 1994 34	Hamburger SV	1-3	Kaiserslautern	Volksparkstadion, Hamburg
15:30	Ivanauskas 35'		Kuka 18'; Wagner 90'; Kuntz 90+3'	Attendance: 36,200; Referee: Karl-Josef Assenmacher
