= 1996 DFB-Supercup =

- Match programme cover
| Borussia Dortmund | 1. FC Kaiserslautern |
| 1 | 1 |
- After extra time Borussia Dortmund won 4–3 on penalties
- Date: 3 August 1996
- Venue: Carl-Benz-Stadion, Mannheim
- Referee: Hans-Peter Best (Kämpfelbach-Bilfingen)
- Attendance: 22,000

The 1996 DFB-Supercup, known as the Panasonic DFB-Supercup for sponsorship purposes, was the tenth DFB-Supercup, an annual football match contested by the winners of the previous season's Bundesliga and DFB-Pokal competitions. It was the last DFB-Supercup, with the competition replaced by a DFB-Ligapokal which ran from 1997 to 2007. The supercup returned in 2010, now run by the Deutsche Fußball Liga (DFL).

The match was played at the Carl-Benz-Stadion, Mannheim, and contested by league champions Borussia Dortmund and cup winners 1. FC Kaiserslautern. Dortmund won their second consecutive title, their third in total.

== Teams ==
| Team | Qualification | Previous appearances (bold indicates winners) |
|---|---|---|
| Borussia Dortmund^{TH} | 1995–96 Bundesliga champions | 2 (**1989**, **1995**) |
| 1. FC Kaiserslautern | 1995–96 DFB-Pokal winners | 2 (1990, **1991 Final**) |

== Match ==
=== Details ===
3 August 1996
18:30 CEST

| Borussia Dortmund | 1–1 (a.e.t.) | 1. FC Kaiserslautern |
|---|---|---|
| Wolters 66' | Report | Marschall 55' |
Penalties
| Reuter (penalty missed); Möller (penalty missed); Chapuisat (penalty scored); But (penalty scored); Zorc (penalty scored); Weiland (penalty scored) | 4–3 | (penalty scored) Wagner; (penalty scored) Kuka; (penalty scored) Schäfer; (penalty missed) Ratinho; (penalty missed) Lutz; (penalty missed) Roos |

Carl-Benz-Stadion, Mannheim
Attendance: 22,000
Referee: Hans-Peter Best (Kämpfelbach-Bilfingen)

| **Borussia Dortmund** | **1. FC Kaiserslautern** |

| GK | 1 | (Germany) Stefan Klos |
| SW | 6 | (Germany) Matthias Sammer | (substituted off) 91' |
| CB | 15 | (Germany) Jürgen Kohler | (substituted off) 60' |
| CB | 17 | (Germany) Jörg Heinrich |
| DM | 21 | (Germany) Carsten Wolters |
| RM | 7 | (Germany) Stefan Reuter |
| CM | 8 | (Germany) Michael Zorc (c) |
| CM | 10 | (Germany) Andreas Möller |
| LM | 24 | (Germany) Dennis Weiland |
| CF | 9 | (Switzerland) Stéphane Chapuisat |
| CF | 18 | (Germany) Lars Ricken | (substituted off) 71' |
Substitutes:
| DF | 20 | (Germany) Günter Kutowski | (substituted on) 60' |
| MF | 29 | (Russia) Vladimir But | (substituted on) 71' |
| MF | 27 | (Germany) Dennis Vogt | (substituted on) 91' |
Manager:
(Germany) Ottmar Hitzfeld

| GK | 1 | (Germany) Andreas Reinke |
| SW | 6 | (Germany) Andreas Brehme | (substituted off) 99' |
| CB | 24 | (Germany) Harry Koch |
| CB | 20 | (Germany) Roger Lutz |
| RWB | 2 | (Germany) Frank Greiner |
| LWB | 8 | (Germany) Martin Wagner |
| CM | 4 | (Germany) Axel Roos |
| CM | 19 | (Germany) Oliver Schäfer |
| CM | 7 | (Germany) Uwe Wegmann | (substituted off) 91' |
| CF | 11 | (Germany) Olaf Marschall (c) | (substituted off) 91' |
| CF | 9 | (Czech Republic) Pavel Kuka |
Substitutes:
| MF | 17 | (Brazil) Ratinho | (substituted on) 91' |
| FW | 18 | (Germany) Jürgen Rische | (substituted on) 91' |
| MF | 12 | (Germany) Andreas Broß | (substituted on) 99' |
Manager:
(Germany) Otto Rehhagel

== See also ==
- 1996–97 Bundesliga
- 1996–97 DFB-Pokal
