= List of 1. FC Kaiserslautern players =

German sports club

This is a list of notable footballers who have played for 1. FC Kaiserslautern. Generally, this means players that have played a significant number of first-class matches for the club. Other players who have played an important role for the club can be included, but the reason why they have been included should be added in the 'Notes' column.

For a list of all 1. FC Kaiserslautern players, major or minor, with a Wikipedia article, see Category:1. FC Kaiserslautern players, and for the current squad see the main 1. FC Kaiserslautern article.

Players are listed according to the date of their first team debut. Appearances and goals are for first-team competitive matches only; wartime matches are excluded. Substitute appearances included.

== Table ==
Name	Nationality	Position	Club career	Appearances	Goals	Notes
Uwe Klimaschefski	Germany	DF	1965–1969	102	5	
Herward Koppenhöfer	Germany	DF	1965–1969	117	1	
Otto Geisert	Germany	MF	1965–1970	153	21	
Gerhard Kentschke	Germany	FW	1966–1970	120	24	
Ernst Diehl	Germany	DF	1967–1978	314	18	
Jürgen Friedrich	Germany	MF	1968–1974	158	26	
Josef Pirrung	Germany	MF	1968–1981	304	61	
Klaus Ackermann	Germany	FW	1969–1974	188	23	
Hany Ramzy	Egypt	DF	1998–2005	188	23	
Fritz Fuchs	Germany	DF	1969–1975	168	12	
Hermann Bitz	Germany	MF	1970–1975	132	15	
Klaus Toppmöller	Germany	FW	1972–1980	204	108	
Ronnie Hellström	Sweden	GK	1974–1984	266	0	
Hans-Peter Briegel	Germany	DF	1975–1984	240	47	
Jürgen Groh	Germany	DF	1976–1980, 1986–1989	197	3	
Hans-Günter Neues	Germany	DF	1977–1983	141	15	
Reiner Geye	Germany	MF	1977–1986	290	47	
Hannes Bongartz	Germany	MF	1978–1984	167	15	
Michael Dusek	Germany	DF	1979–1988	210	10	
Norbert Eilenfeldt	Germany	MF	1981–1986	127	25	
Andreas Brehme	Germany	MF	1981–1986, 1993–1998	269	43	
Thomas Allofs	Germany	FW	1982–1986	126	61	
Herbert Hoos	Germany	MF	1983–1990	133	7	
Gerald Ehrmann	Germany	GK	1984–1997	292	0	
Mark Schwarzer	Australia	GK	1995–1996	4	0	
Michael Ballack	Germany	MF	1997–1999	46	4	
Nathan Altaffer	United States	MF	1994-1996	33	5	
Sergio Allievi	Germany	FW	1986–1990	119	14	
Thomas Dooley	United States	DF	1988–1993	128	13	
Demir Hotić	Yugoslavia	MF	1989–1993	100	26	
Marco Haber	Germany	MF	1989–1995	139	10	
Stefan Kuntz	Germany	FW	1989–1995	170	75	
Miroslav Kadlec	Czech Republic	DF	1990–1998	234	17	
Martin Wagner	Germany	MF	1992–2000	200	30	
Pavel Kuka	Czech Republic	FW	1994–1998	121	53	
Thomas Hengen	Germany	DF	1992–1996, 2001–2004	112	5	
Ciriaco Sforza	Switzerland	MF	1993–1995, 1997–2000, 2002–2006	199	20	
Harry Koch	Germany	DF	1996–2003	220	23	
Andreas Buck	Germany	MF	1997–2002	103	5	
Marian Hristov	Bulgaria	MF	1997–2004	146	26	
Miroslav Klose	Germany	FW	2000–2004	120	44	
Alexander Ring	Finland	MF	2013–2017	76	8	
