= Stefan Ertl =

German footballer (born 1969)

Personal information
- Date of birth: 21 April 1969 (age 57)
- Height: 1.87 m (6 ft 2 in)
- Position: Midfielder

Youth career
- SV Geinsheim
- VfR Frankenthal

Senior career*
Years	Team	Apps	(Gls)
1992–1993	Borussia Mönchengladbach	9	(1)
1993–1994	Fortuna Köln	7	(0)
1994–1997	TSG Pfeddersheim		
1997–1999	1. FC Kaiserslautern	5	(0)
1999–2001	Kickers Offenbach	61	(9)
2001–2003	Karlsruher SC	9	(0)
2003–2006	Wormatia Worms	74	(21)
- * Club domestic league appearances and goals

Stefan Ertl (born 21 April 1969) is a German former professional footballer who played as a midfielder. He spent two seasons in the Bundesliga with Borussia Mönchengladbach and 1. FC Kaiserslautern.

== Honours ==
1. FC Kaiserslautern

- Bundesliga: 1997–98
