= Günter Kutowski =

German footballer and agent

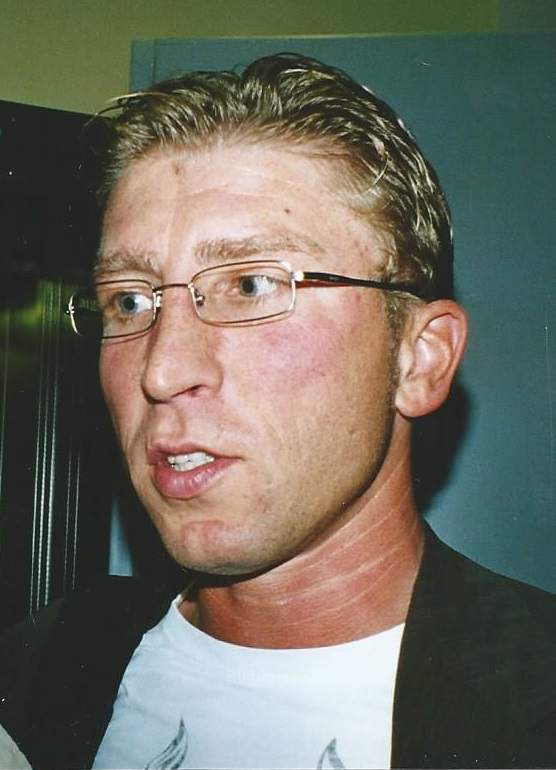
- Kutowski in 2005

Personal information
- Date of birth: 2 August 1965 (age 61)
- Place of birth: Paderborn, West Germany
- Height: 1.78 m (5 ft 10 in)
- Position: Defender

Youth career
- SV Sande
- FC Paderborn

Senior career*
Years	Team	Apps	(Gls)
1984–1996	Borussia Dortmund	288	(3)
1996	TuS Paderborn-Neuhaus		
1996–1997	Rot-Weiss Essen	7	(0)
1997–2001	Paderborn 07	82	(3)
Total		377	(6)
- * Club domestic league appearances and goals

Günter Kutowski (born 2 August 1965) is a German retired professional footballer who played as a defender.

== Career ==
Born in Paderborn, Kutowski joined Borussia Dortmund in 1984 at the age of 19, arriving from local amateurs 1. FC Paderborn. He made his Bundesliga debut on 2 March 1985 in a 1–1 home draw against Bayern Munich, and finished his first season with 16 complete matches as the club ranked in 14th position and avoided relegation by just one point.

In eight of the following 11 years, Kutowski was an automatic first-choice for the Black and Yellow, scoring his first goal in the top division on 10 August 1985 in a 1–1 draw at 1. FC Saarbrucken. In the 1992–93 campaign he appeared in 40 official games, including eight in the team's runner-up run in the UEFA Cup.

Kutowski left Borussia in 1996, joining lower league side TuS Paderborn-Neuhaus. His last stop as a professional came in 1996–97, as he played a few matches with Rot-Weiss Essen who ultimately suffered relegation from the 2. Bundesliga; he retired altogether at 36, and subsequently became a player's agent.

== Honours ==
Borussia Dortmund

- Bundesliga: 1994–95, 1995–96
- DFL-Supercup: 1989, 1996
- DFB-Pokal: 1988–89
- UEFA Cup: runner-up 1992–93
