= Markus Hausweiler =

German footballer

Personal information
- Date of birth: 15 April 1976 (age 50)
- Place of birth: Wegberg, West Germany
- Height: 1.78 m (5 ft 10 in)
- Position: Midfielder

Youth career
- –1988: VfR Neuss

Senior career*
| Years | Team | Apps | (Gls) |
| 1988–2005 | Borussia Mönchengladbach | 141 | (6) |
| 2005–2008 | MSV Duisburg | 3 | (0) |
- * Club domestic league appearances and goals

Markus Hausweiler (born 15 April 1976) is a German former footballer.

Hausweiler had been starting his career at Borussia Mönchengladbach, a club he joined as a twelve-year-old in 1988 from VfR Neuss. Debuting for Mönchengladbach in the Bundesliga on 16 March 1996, Hausweiler was a permanent member of the Mönchengladbach squad since becoming professional at the start of the 1997–98 campaign. Still on contract with his side he was suspended from first team training under then Mönchengladbach manager Dick Advocaat in spring 2005 together with Marcelo Pletsch and Igor Demo. Despite Hausweiler complaining and appealing, his contract got terminated consequently.

At the start of the 2005–06 season he joined newly promoted MSV Duisburg that was managed by Norbert Meier, once his manager in his youth at Mönchengladbach. Three matches into the season, the tough tackling midfielder picked up a persistent knee-injury that kept him out for more than just the remainder of that season and forced him in retirement.
