= Ratinho (footballer, born 1971) =

Brazilian footballer

Personal information
- Full name: Everson Rodrigues
- Date of birth: June 8, 1971 (age 55)
- Place of birth: Colorado, Paraná, Brazil
- Height: 1.71 m (5 ft 7 in)
- Position: Midfielder

Senior career*
| Years | Team | Apps | (Gls) |
- Matsubara
| –1991 | Atlético Paranaense | | |
| 1991–1993 | St. Gallen | | |
| 1993–1996 | FC Aarau | | |
| 1996–2003 | 1. FC Kaiserslautern | 140 | (9) |
| 2003 | Shengyang Ginde | | |
| 2004 | Zhenis Astana | | |
| 2004–2007 | FC Luzern | | |

Managerial career
- 2007–2008: FC Luzern (Youth head coach)
- 2008–2009: St. Gallen (Youth coordinator)
- 2010–2011: 1. FC Kaiserslautern (U-17 head coach)
- * Club domestic league appearances and goals

Everson Rodrigues, known as Everson Ratinho or simply Ratinho (born June 8, 1971) is a Brazilian football coach and former player. Until summer 2011, he managed the youth team of 1. FC Kaiserslautern.

== Honours ==
- 2. Bundesliga: 1996–97
- Bundesliga: 1997–98
- DFB-Pokal finalist: 2002–03
