= Carsten Wolters =

German footballer and coach

Personal information
- Full name: Carsten Wolters
- Date of birth: 25 July 1969 (age 57)
- Place of birth: Gelsenkirchen, West Germany
- Height: 1.78 m (5 ft 10 in)
- Positions: Defender; midfielder

Team information
- Current team: Rot-Weiss Essen (assistant)

Youth career
- –1990: Erler SV 08

Senior career*
| Years | Team | Apps | (Gls) |
| 1990–1993 | SG Wattenscheid 09 II | | |
| 1992–1995 | SG Wattenscheid 09 | 79 | (14) |
| 1995–1997 | Borussia Dortmund | 12 | (1) |
| 1997–2007 | MSV Duisburg | 283 | (17) |
| 2007–2008 | MSV Duisburg II | 36 | (1) |
| Total | | 410 | (33) |

Managerial career
- 2007–2008: MSV Duisburg II (assistant)
- 2008–2011: MSV Duisburg U17
- 2011–2016: MSV Duisburg U19
- 2016–: Rot-Weiss Essen U19
- 2016–: Rot-Weiss Essen (assistant)
- * Club domestic league appearances and goals

Carsten „Erle“ Wolters (born 25 July 1969) is a German football coach and former player, who works as youth and assistant coach at Rot-Weiss Essen. He played as a defender for MSV Duisburg, Borussia Dortmund and Wattenscheid 09.

== Honours ==
- Bundesliga: 1995–96
- DFL-Supercup: 1996
