= Thomas Riedl =

German former footballer (born 1976)

Personal information
- Date of birth: 18 June 1976 (age 50)
- Place of birth: Kaiserslautern, West Germany
- Height: 1.74 m (5 ft 9 in)
- Position: Defensive midfielder

Youth career
- Phönix Otterbach
- 1. FC Kaiserslautern

Senior career*
Years	Team	Apps	(Gls)
1994–1999	1. FC Kaiserslautern	70	(6)
1999–2001	1860 Munich	35	(1)
2001–2006	1. FC Kaiserslautern	108	(3)
2006–2010	SK Austria Kärnten	69	(0)
2009	→ SAK Klagenfurt (loan)	6	(0)
2010–2011	Eintracht Trier		
2011	SC Idar-Oberstein		
2011–2012	FK Pirmasens		

International career
1996	Germany U-21	1	(0)
- * Club domestic league appearances and goals

Thomas Riedl (born 18 June 1976) is a German former footballer who played as a defensive midfielder. He is the son of Hannes Riedl, who played for 1. FC Kaiserslautern in the 1970s.

Riedl is a youth exponent of hometown club 1. FC Kaiserslautern. At Kaiserslautern, he played from 1994 to 1999, winning the 1997–98 Bundesliga and the 1995–96 DFB-Pokal. Following a two-year stint at TSV 1860 Munich, he re-joined Kaiserlautern in 2001 before the club in 2006 for Austrian side SK Austria Kärnten where remained for four years and spent a half-season on loan at SAK Klagenfurt in 2009. Towards the end of his career, he returned to Germany playing for lower league clubs Eintracht Trier, SC Idar-Oberstein, and FK Pirmasens.

At international level, Riedl earned one cap playing for the Germany U-21 team.

== Honours ==
- Bundesliga: 1997–98
- DFB-Pokal: 1995–96; finalist: 2002–03
