= Dennis Weiland =

German footballer

Dennis Wieland
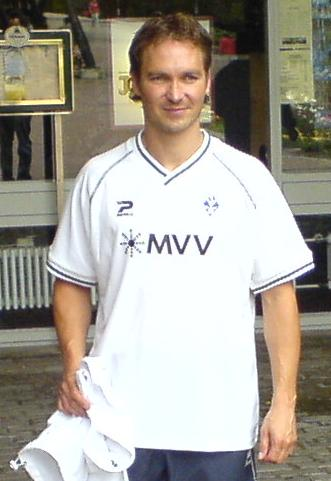

Personal information
- Date of birth: 30 August 1974 (age 52)
- Place of birth: Hanover, Germany
- Height: 1.78 m (5 ft 10 in)
- Position: Midfielder

Youth career
- –1991: SV Germania Grasdorf
- 1991–1993: Hannover 96

Senior career*
Years	Team	Apps	(Gls)
1993–1994	Sportfreunde Ricklingen		
1994–1997	Borussia Dortmund II		
1996–1997	Borussia Dortmund	0	(0)
1997–1998	Rot-Weiß Oberhausen	30	(3)
1998–1999	Arminia Hannover	34	(3)
1999–2001	VfL Osnabrück	30	(2)
2001–2006	Mainz 05	94	(6)
2006–2007	Eintracht Braunschweig	10	(0)
2007–2008	Waldhof Mannheim	24	(1)
2008–2009	Waldhof Mannheim II		
2009–2010	Arminia Hannover		
- * Club domestic league appearances and goals

Dennis Weiland (born 30 August 1974) is a German former professional footballer who played as a midfielder. He spent two seasons in the Bundesliga with 1. FSV Mainz 05. His brother Niclas is also a former footballer.

== Honours ==
Borussia Dortmund

- DFB-Supercup: 1996
