= Andreas Reinke =

German footballer (born 1969)

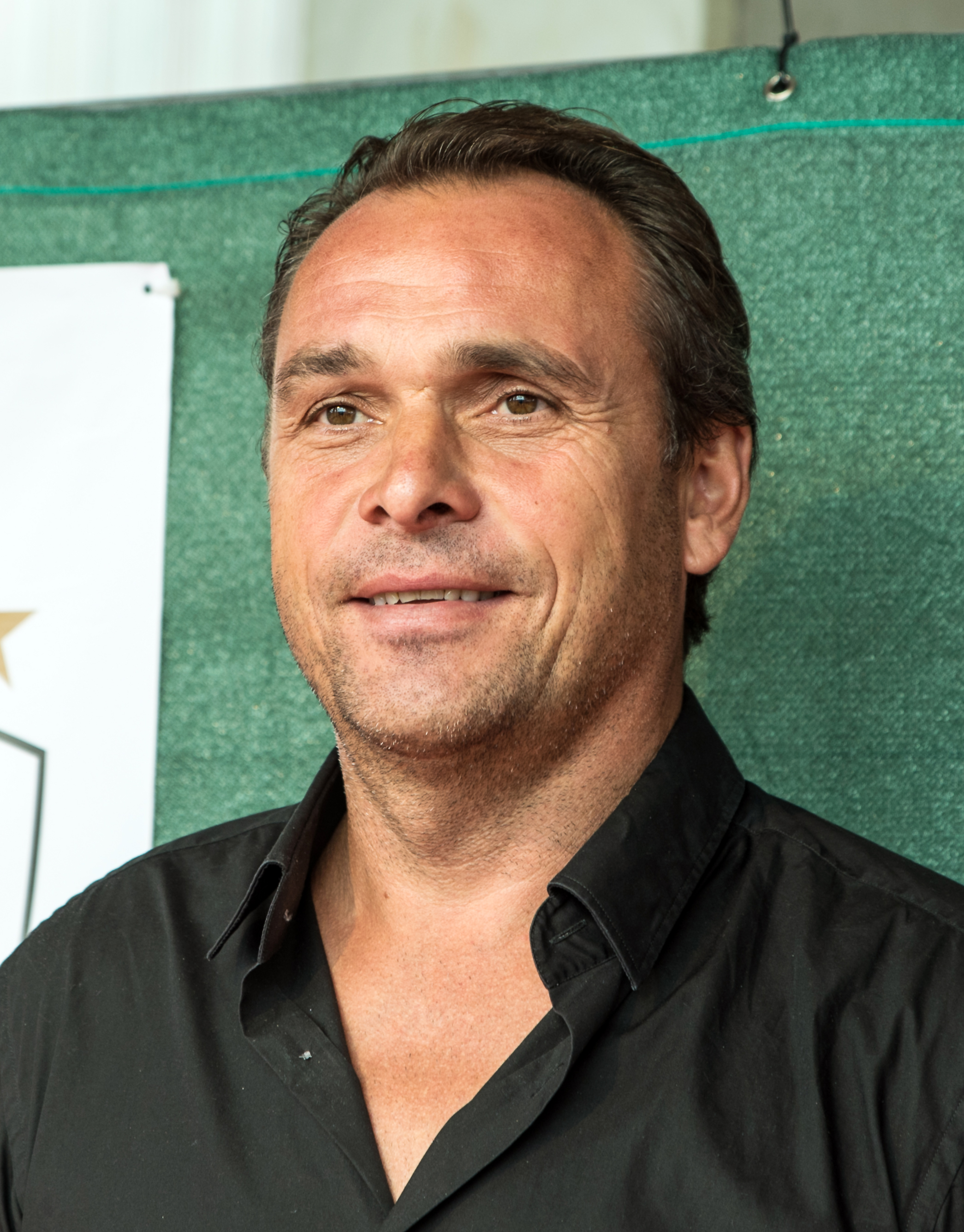
- Reinke in 2016

Personal information
- Date of birth: 10 January 1969 (age 57)
- Place of birth: Krakow am See, East Germany
- Height: 1.92 m (6 ft 4 in)
- Position: Goalkeeper

Youth career
- 1975–1985: Dynamo Güstrow
- 1985–1987: Dynamo Schwerin

Senior career*
| Years | Team | Apps | (Gls) |
| 1987–1990 | Dynamo Schwerin | 79 | (0) |
| 1990–1993 | Hamburger SV II | 84 | (2) |
| 1991 | Hamburger SV | 1 | (0) |
| 1993–1994 | FC St. Pauli | 35 | (0) |
| 1994–2000 | 1. FC Kaiserslautern | 161 | (0) |
| 2000–2001 | Iraklis | 19 | (0) |
| 2001–2003 | Real Murcia | 79 | (1) |
| 2003–2007 | Werder Bremen | 91 | (0) |
| Total | | 549 | (3) |

Managerial career
- 2010–2012: Bölkower SV
- * Club domestic league appearances and goals

Andreas Reinke (born 10 January 1969) is a German former professional footballer who played as a goalkeeper.

During his professional career, in which he appeared for six clubs in three countries, he played in 228 Bundesliga games during 11 seasons.

== Career ==
Born in Krakow am See, Bezirk Schwerin, Reinke started playing senior football in his native East Germany with Dynamo Schwerin, moving in 1990 – with the nation already reunified – to Hamburger SV. There, he played his first game in the Bundesliga on 28 August 1991, a 0–3 home loss against Stuttgarter Kickers; that would be his only appearance for the first team in three years.

After helping FC St. Pauli narrowly miss out on promotion from the second division, Reinke signed with 1. FC Kaiserslautern, where he won his first trophies: in 1996, the Palatinate Forest side suffered top flight relegation but managed to win the cup, 1–0 against Karlsruher SC.

Reinke and Kaiserslautern immediately promoted back, amazingly repeating the feat of winning the league the following year, with the player conceding 53 in 56 matches both seasons combined.

Deemed surplus to requirements in the 2000 summer, Reinke spent the following three years abroad, starting in Greece with Iraklis then moving to Real Murcia after one year. With the Spaniards, he won the Ricardo Zamora Trophy in the 2002–03 campaign as the club returned to La Liga; apart from only conceding 21 in 40 games he still found the net, converting a penalty kick in a 2–1 home win over CD Numancia.

Aged 34, Reinke returned to his country, signing with SV Werder Bremen. In his first year the club won the double, and he did not miss one second of action in that and the following seasons. However, he would be eventually pushed to the bench by younger Tim Wiese (who also played at Kaiserslautern) and retired from the game at the end of 2006–07, aged 38, having accomplished the feat of being the first goalkeeper to win the German championship with two different clubs.

Reinke started his coaching career shortly after, briefly being in charge of Germany under-21s goalkeepers. In 2013, he signed for Hansa Rostock in the same predicament.

== Honours ==
1. FC Kaiserslautern

- Bundesliga: 1997–98
- DFB-Pokal: 1995–96
- 2. Bundesliga: 1996–97

Real Murcia

- Segunda División: 2002–03

Werder Bremen

- Bundesliga: 2003–04
- DFB-Pokal: 2003–04
- DFB-Ligapokal: 2006

Individual

- Ricardo Zamora Trophy: 2002–03 (Segunda División)
