= Uwe Wegmann =

German footballer (born 1964)

Personal information
- Date of birth: 14 January 1964 (age 62)
- Place of birth: Immenstadt, West Germany
- Height: 1.79 m (5 ft 10 in)
- Positions: Midfielder; forward

Youth career
- –1982: TSV Fischen

Senior career*
Years	Team	Apps	(Gls)
1982–1985	1. FC Sonthofen		
1985–1987	VfL Bochum	56	(9)
1987–1989	Rot-Weiss Essen	58	(9)
1989–1995	VfL Bochum	188	(65)
1995–1997	1. FC Kaiserslautern	54	(9)
1997–1999	Lugano	21	(3)
1999–2002	FC Vaduz		
2002–2004	FC Wangen bei Olten		
2004–2007	FC Kempten		

Managerial career
- 1999–2002: FC Vaduz (player-manager)
- 2004–2007: FC Kempten (player-manager)
- 2007–2008: FC Kempten
- 2008–2014: USV Eschen/Mauren
- 2013–2014: Liechtenstein U19
- 2014–2018: SC Brühl
- 2018–2019: FC Memmingen
- * Club domestic league appearances and goals

Uwe Wegmann (born 14 January 1964) is a German football coach and a retired player.

His 22 goals in the 1993–94 season in the 2. Bundesliga made him the league's topscorer and helped to secure VfL Bochum's direct return to the German top flight.

== Career statistics ==
Appearances and goals by club, season and competition
Club	Season	League			Cup		Continental		Other		Total	
Club	Season	Division	Apps	Goals	Apps	Goals	Apps	Goals	Apps	Goals	Apps	Goals
1. FC Sonthofen	1982–83				–		–					
1. FC Sonthofen	1983–84				–		–					
1. FC Sonthofen	1984–85				–		–					
1. FC Sonthofen	Total											
VfL Bochum	1985–86	Bundesliga	32	4	5	1	–		–		37	5
VfL Bochum	1986–87	Bundesliga	24	5	1	0	–		–		25	5
VfL Bochum	Total		56	9	6	1	0	0	0	0	62	10
Rot-Weiß Essen	1987–88	2. Bundesliga	28	4	0	0	–		–		28	4
Rot-Weiß Essen	1988–89	2. Bundesliga	30	5	3	1	–		–		33	6
Rot-Weiß Essen	Total		58	9	3	1	0	0	0	0	61	10
VfL Bochum	1989–90	Bundesliga	31	6	2	2	–		2 (Note: Appearances in Bundesliga relegation play-offs)	0	35	8
VfL Bochum	1990–91	Bundesliga	27	2	1	0	–		–		28	2
VfL Bochum	1991–92	Bundesliga	34	11	1	0	–		–		35	11
VfL Bochum	1992–93	Bundesliga	33	13	1	1	–		–		34	14
VfL Bochum	1993–94	2. Bundesliga	30	22	1	0	–		–		31	22
VfL Bochum	1994–95	Bundesliga	33	11	2	2	–		–		35	13
VfL Bochum	Total		188	65	8	5	0	0	2	0	198	70
1. FC Kaiserslautern	1995–96	Bundesliga	26	2	4	0	4	2	–		34	4
1. FC Kaiserslautern	1996–97	2. Bundesliga	28	7	1	0	2	1	1 (Note: Appearance in DFL-Supercup)	0	32	8
1. FC Kaiserslautern	Total		54	9	5	0	6	3	1	0	66	12
Lugano	1997–98	Nationalliga B	3	1					12 (Note: Appearances in Nationalliga A / Nationalliga B play-offs)	1		
Lugano	1998–99	Nationalliga A	18	3								
Lugano	Total		21	3								
FC Vaduz	1999–00	1. Liga										
FC Vaduz	2000–01	1. Liga										
FC Vaduz	2001–02	Nationalliga B	22	3					4 (Note: Appearances in Nationalliga B relegation play-offs)	0		
FC Vaduz	Total											
FC Wangen bei Olten	2002–03											
FC Wangen bei Olten	2003–04	1. Liga										
FC Wangen bei Olten	Total											
FC Kempten	2004–05	Landesliga Bayern-Süd			–		–					
FC Kempten	2005–06	Oberliga Bayern	30	7	–		–					
FC Kempten	2006–07	Landesliga Bayern-Süd			–		–					
FC Kempten	2007–08	Oberliga Bayern	1	0	–		–					
FC Kempten	Total											
Career total												

== Honours ==
1. FC Kaiserslautern

- DFB-Pokal: 1995–96

Individual

- 2. Bundesliga top scorer: 1993–94 (22 goals)
