= Thomas Ritter =

German footballer

Personal information
- Date of birth: 10 October 1967 (age 59)
- Place of birth: Görlitz, East Germany
- Height: 1.83 m (6 ft 0 in)
- Position: Defender

Youth career
- –1980: ISG Hagenwerder
- 1980–1986: Dynamo Dresden

Senior career*
Years	Team	Apps	(Gls)
1986–1989	Dynamo Dresden II	79	(8)
1987–1989	Dynamo Dresden	3	(0)
1989–1990	Fortschritt Bischofswerda	9	(0)
1990	→ TSG Meißen	3	(1)
1990–1992	Stuttgarter Kickers	71	(1)
1992–1995	1. FC Kaiserslautern	87	(2)
1996–1999	Karlsruher SC	57	(1)
1999–2000	SC Austria Lustenau	11	(0)
2000–2001	Changchun Yatai		
2001–2002	Stuttgarter Kickers	5	(1)
2003–2005	FT Eider Büdelsdorf	44	(2)

International career
1993	Germany	1	(0)
- * Club domestic league appearances and goals

Thomas Ritter (born 10 October 1967) is a German former professional footballer who played as a defender.

== Club career ==
Ritter was born in Görlitz. He amassed over 180 appearances in the East and unified German top-flight. Next to his stints in German clubs he played in Austria and China.

== International career ==
In 1987 Ritter was part of East Germany's bronze medal team at the FIFA World Youth Championship in Chile. The defender played one game for Germany on 13 October 1993 in a friendly against Uruguay – as a substitute for Stefan Effenberg.

== Honours ==
- DDR-Oberliga: 1988–89
- Bundesliga runner-up: 1993–94
- DFB-Pokal runner-up: 1995–96
