= Harry Koch (German footballer) =

German footballer and coach

Personal information
- Date of birth: 15 November 1969 (age 56)
- Place of birth: Bamberg, West Germany
- Height: 1.82 m (6 ft 0 in)
- Position: Centre-back

Youth career
- SV Hallstadt

Senior career*
Years	Team	Apps	(Gls)
1988–1990	SV Hallstadt		
1990–1995	TSV Vestenbergsgreuth	34	(6)
1995–2003	1. FC Kaiserslautern	220	(23)
2003–2006	Eintracht Trier	69	(5)

Managerial career
- 2006–2011: SV Dörbach
- * Club domestic league appearances and goals

Harry Koch (born 15 November 1969) is a German former professional footballer, who played as a centre-back, and a coach.

His son Robin (b. 1996) is also a footballer, playing for Eintracht Frankfurt and the Germany national football team.

== Football career ==
Born in Bamberg, Koch arrived in the Bundesliga at already 26, with 1. FC Kaiserslautern, after having played amateur football, and quickly became an undisputed starter. In 1997–98, he played in 31 matches as the club won the national league straight out of the second division.

In 2003, after 187 matches with 17 goals in the first division, Koch moved to SV Eintracht Trier 05, closing out his career three years later. Immediately after, he took up coaching, replacing Werner Kartz at the helm of lower-level team SV Dörbach.

== Honours ==
1. FC Kaiserslautern

- Bundesliga (1): 1997–98
- DFB-Pokal (1): 1995–96; runner-up 2002–03
- 2. Bundesliga (1): 1996–97
