= Thomas Hengen =

German former professional footballer (born 1974)

Personal information
- Full name: Thomas Hengen
- Date of birth: 22 September 1974 (age 52)
- Place of birth: Landau, West Germany
- Height: 1.84 m (6 ft 0 in)
- Position: Defender

Youth career
- SV Rülzheim
- –1992: Phönix Bellheim

Senior career*
Years	Team	Apps	(Gls)
1992–1996	1. FC Kaiserslautern	59	(5)
1996–1998	Karlsruher SC	61	(1)
1998–1999	Borussia Dortmund	13	(0)
1999	→ Beşiktaş (loan)	6	(0)
2000–2001	VfL Wolfsburg	39	(1)
2001–2004	1. FC Kaiserslautern	53	(0)
2004–2006	Alemannia Aachen	0	(0)
Total		231	(7)

International career
1994–1996	Germany U-21	13	(0)

Managerial career
- 2007–2008: Alemannia Aachen II
- * Club domestic league appearances and goals

Thomas Hengen (born 22 September 1974) is a German former professional footballer who played as a defender.

== Playing career ==
Born in Landau in the Palatinate, Hengen was in the amateur side of the SV Rülzheim and Phönix Bellheim before he moved 1989 to 1. FC Kaiserslautern. With the A youth team, he won the German youth championship in 1993. As an international youth player, he amassed a total of 13 international matches in the U16 and U18, then another 13 games for the U21 national team.

In the 1992–93 season, he debuted for 1. FC Kaiserslautern his first Bundesliga match. In his last game for 1. FC Kaiserslautern, he won the German Cup in Berlin in May 1996.

He then accepted the offer of Karlsruher SC who, after the departure of Jens Nowotny, were on the lookout for a new defense boss. He fit seamlessly into the team in his first season 1996–97 at KSC and completed 30 of 34 games. In the following season, the KSC relegated from the Bundesliga but Hengen stayed in the Bundesliga playing for Borussia Dortmund, VfL Wolfsburg and Kaiserslautern, only interrupted by a brief interlude with Beşiktaş J.K. Overall, he amassed 224 Bundesliga matches and seven goals.

In 2004, he moved to the 2. Bundesliga side Alemannia Aachen, but did not play any more because of a chronic hip osteoarthritis. After unsuccessful rehabilitation, he retired in early 2006.

== Post-playing career ==
From 2006 to 2007, he was head of the junior excellence centre of TSV Alemannia Aachen. In the 2007–08 season, he took over the training of the second team until the end of the season.

== Honours ==
- DFB-Pokal: 1995–96
