= Frank Greiner =

German footballer (born 1966)

Personal information
- Date of birth: 3 July 1966 (age 60)
- Place of birth: Coburg, West Germany
- Height: 1.74 m (5 ft 9 in)
- Positions: Midfielder; defender

Youth career
- VfB Coburg

Senior career*
Years	Team	Apps	(Gls)
1987–1988	1. FC Nürnberg	5	(0)
1988–1995	1. FC Köln	176	(14)
1995–1997	1. FC Kaiserslautern	50	(0)
1997–2003	VfL Wolfsburg	127	(5)
2002–2003	VfL Wolfsburg II	2	(0)
2006–2007	MTV Gifhorn	4	(0)

Managerial career
- 2004: VfL Wolfsburg U19
- 2004–2005: VfL Wolfsburg II (assistant)
- 2006–2007: MTV Gifhorn (assistant)
- 2013: FC Mordovia (assistant)
- * Club domestic league appearances and goals

Frank Greiner (born 3 July 1966) is a German football coach and a former player.

== Playing career ==
Frank Greiner was born in Coburg on 3 July 1966. Beginning in 1987, he played professional football for sixteen years, almost exclusively in the Bundesliga. He played just one season in the 2. Bundesliga, with 1. FC Kaiserslautern, playing 28 matches as the club were promoted.

Greiner played for 1. FC Nürnberg until 1988, when he moved to 1. FC Köln and established himself as a regular player. Köln reached the final of the DFB-Pokal in 1991, ultimately losing to Werder Bremen. Playing for Köln in February 1994, Greiner was headbutted by Altin Rraklli. He played for Köln for seven years, including 15 games in the UEFA Cup. In 1995, he moved to 1. FC Kaiserslautern, winning the DFB-Pokal in 1996. He moved to VfL Wolfsburg in September 1997, the same season that Kaiserslautern won the German title. He remained with Wolfsburg until his playing career finished in 2003.

== Coaching career ==
Greiner was the co-assistant of MTV Gifhorn from 2006 until 2008, during which time he made a comeback as a player due to an injury crisis. In January 2013, he rejoined Wolfsburg teammate Dorinel Munteanu as assistant coach of Russian Football National League side FC Mordovia Saransk. He joined the staff at the Wolfsburg academy in February 2014.

== Honours ==
1. FC Köln

- DFB-Pokal runner-up: 1990–91

1. FC Kaiserlautern

- DFB-Pokal: 1995–96
- Bundesliga: 1997–98
