= Gerry Ehrmann =

German football coach and former player

Gerald Ehrmann
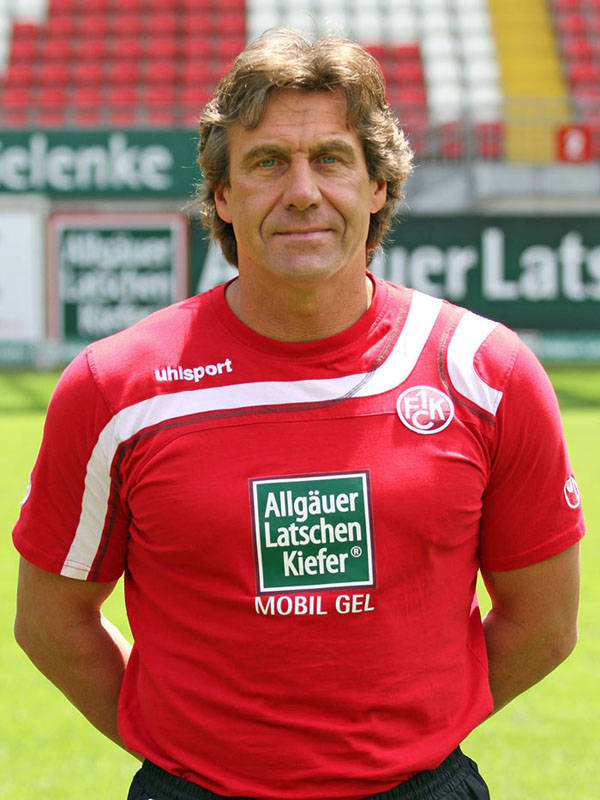
- Ehrmann with Kaiserslautern in 2011.

Personal information
- Full name: Gerald Ehrmann
- Date of birth: 18 February 1959 (age 67)
- Place of birth: Tauberbischofsheim, West Germany
- Height: 1.84 m (6 ft 1/2 in)
- Position: Goalkeeper

Team information
- Current team: 1. FC Kaiserslautern (goalkeeping coach)

Youth career
- 1965–1977: TSV Tauberbischofsheim

Senior career*
Years	Team	Apps	(Gls)
1977–1984	1. FC Köln	2	(0)
1984–1997	1. FC Kaiserslautern	301	(0)
- * Club domestic league appearances and goals

Gerald "Gerry" Ehrmann (born 18 February 1959 in Tauberbischofsheim, Baden-Württemberg) is a German football coach and former player who is a goalkeeping coach with 1. FC Kaiserslautern.

== Honours ==
- Bundesliga champion: 1977–78, 1990–91
- Bundesliga runner-up: 1981–82, 1993–94
- DFB-Pokal winner: 1977–78, 1982–83, 1989–90, 1995–96
- DFB-Pokal finalist: 1979–80
