= Andreas Brehme =

German footballer (1960–2024)

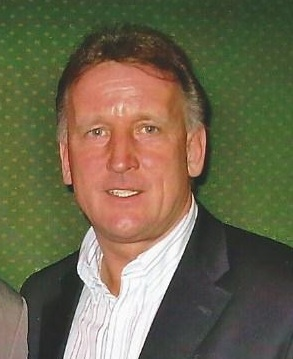
- Brehme in 2008

Personal information
- Date of birth: 9 November 1960
- Place of birth: Hamburg, West Germany
- Date of death: 20 February 2024 (aged 63)
- Place of death: Munich, Germany
- Height: 1.76 m (5 ft 9 in)
- Positions: Left-back; left wing-back; defensive midfielder

Youth career
- 1965–1978: HSV Barmbek-Uhlenhorst

Senior career*
Years	Team	Apps	(Gls)
1978–1980	HSV Barmbek-Uhlenhorst	66	(10)
1980–1981	1. FC Saarbrücken	36	(3)
1981–1986	1. FC Kaiserslautern	154	(34)
1986–1988	Bayern Munich	59	(7)
1988–1992	Inter Milan	116	(11)
1992–1993	Zaragoza	24	(1)
1993–1998	1. FC Kaiserslautern	120	(9)
Total		509	(65)

International career
1980–1981	West Germany U-21	3	(0)
1981–1984	West Germany Olympic	10	(2)
1984–1994	West Germany / Germany	86	(8)

Managerial career
- 2000–2002: 1. FC Kaiserslautern
- 2004–2005: SpVgg Unterhaching
Medal record
Men's football
Representing Germany
FIFA World Cup
Winner	1990 Italy
Runner-up	1986 Mexico
UEFA European Championship
Runner-up	1992 Sweden
- * Club domestic league appearances and goals

Andreas "Andi" Brehme (German pronunciation: [anˈdʁeːas ˈʔandiː ˈbʁeːmə]; 9 November 1960 – 20 February 2024) was a German professional football player and coach. At international level, he is best known for scoring the winning goal for Germany in the 1990 FIFA World Cup final against Argentina from an 85th-minute penalty kick. At club level, Brehme played for several teams in Germany and also had spells in Italy and Spain.

A versatile attacking full-back with an eye for goal, Brehme was capable of playing anywhere along the flank on either side of the pitch, and was known for his crossing ability, ambidexterity, and his accuracy from free-kicks and penalties, possessing a powerful shot.

== Club career ==
Andreas Brehme was born in Hamburg and started his career with the city's local side HSV Barmbek-Uhlenhorst.

Brehme played for 1. FC Kaiserslautern from 1981 to 1986, before moving to Bayern Munich, where he played from 1986 to 1988, winning the Bundesliga in 1987. After that, he joined Italian side Inter Milan, playing there from 1988 to 1992, alongside compatriots Lothar Matthäus and Jürgen Klinsmann, and winning the Serie A in 1989 – also being named player of the year – and the UEFA Cup in 1991. Brehme played the 1992–93 season at Real Zaragoza in La Liga, before returning to Germany in 1993 to play for Kaiserslautern once again. He won the German Cup with the club in 1996, although they suffered relegation during the same season; nevertheless, Brehme remained with the team even when they were relegated, playing a key role in the side's immediate promotion the following season. After subsequently winning the Bundesliga with the club in 1998, Brehme ended his playing career as a footballer after having played 301 matches.

== International career ==
As a member of the (West) Germany national team, Brehme took part at UEFA Euro 1984, the 1984 Summer Olympics, the 1986 FIFA World Cup, UEFA Euro 1988, the 1990 FIFA World Cup, UEFA Euro 1992, and the 1994 World Cup; he was named in the team of the tournament at Euro 84, and helped Germany to the semi-finals of Euro 88, on home soil, scoring a goal in the nation's 1–1 opening draw against Italy. At Euro 1992, he won a runners-up medal, as Germany lost out 2–0 to Denmark in the final; he was once again named to the team of the tournament. Brehme won a runners-up medal at the 1986 FIFA World Cup, as Germany lost the final to Argentina, yet he won the World Cup in 1990 against the same opponents, later being named to the competition's All-star team. In the 1986 World Cup semi-final he scored a deflected free-kick against France, and in the 1990 semi-final he also scored a free-kick goal against England, which also took a deflection off of English defender Paul Parker, however. In the 1990 edition of the tournament, en route to the final, he also previously set up Klinsmann's headed goal in Germany's opening 4–1 against Yugoslavia, and scored the second goal against the Netherlands with a right-footed curler in the second round. In the 1990 World Cup final, a 1–0 victory over Argentina, he scored the goal, a penalty kick with his right foot. The only other penalty kick, taken in open play for Germany, was against England in a 1986 World Cup warm-up match in Mexico; which was missed. Brehme scored in the victorious penalty-shootout against Mexico in the 1986 World Cup quarter-finals with his left foot, while he scored his nation's first spot-kick in the penalty shoot-out victory against England in the 1990 World Cup semi-finals with his right foot. Brehme's last of his 86 caps for the national team came during the 1994 FIFA World Cup, which ended with a disappointing quarter-final exit for his team after a loss against Bulgaria.

== Managerial career ==
After retiring from football, Brehme went on to become a coach. He managed his former club 1. FC Kaiserslautern from 2000 to 2002. He then managed 2. Bundesliga side SpVgg Unterhaching. He was then assistant coach alongside Giovanni Trapattoni at VfB Stuttgart, but both were sacked after only a few months at the club.

== Style of play ==
An efficient attacking full-back or wing-back, Brehme was regarded as one of the best left-backs of his generation; although he was usually deployed on the left side of his team's defensive line, he was a highly versatile player, who was capable of playing anywhere along the flank, on either side of the pitch, and could also play in a more offensive role. He was also used in the centre of the pitch on occasion, as a defensive midfielder. Although he was not particularly quick, he was known for his excellent technical ability, stamina, defensive skills, anticipation, and tactical intelligence, as well as his ability to make attacking runs, which enabled him to cover the flank effectively and contribute at both ends of the pitch.

A set-piece specialist, Brehme is considered to be one of the greatest free-kick takers and crossers of all time, and was known for his ability to strike the ball with power and swerve. However, Brehme's most distinctive skill was that he was one of the few players in the world who was genuinely ambidextrous, and could play with both feet equally well, making him very valuable as an outfield player; his ability with either foot led his national team manager Franz Beckenbauer to state: "I have known Andy for 20 years and I still don't know if he is right or left-footed". He was well known for taking penalties (although not exclusively) with his right foot and taking free kicks and corners with his left foot; this made him quite an unpredictable player to read during matches. Although he was reportedly naturally left-footed, it is believed that Brehme felt that his right foot was actually more accurate than his left, but that he had a more powerful shot with his "weaker" left foot. This was shown when, in the 1990 World Cup final, Brehme took the spot kick that won West Germany the trophy, with his right foot, but four years earlier, Brehme scored in the 1986 World Cup quarter-final penalty shootout against Mexico with a left foot piledriver. In addition to his abilities as a footballer, Brehme was highly regarded for his strength of character and composure under pressure, as well as for having the tendency to score "clutch" goals for his team in important games, as demonstrated by his ability to score decisive penalties in World Cup knockout matches, which led him to be considered a "big game player" in the media.

Although he was known to be tenacious player, he also stood out for his professionalism throughout his career, both on and off the pitch. Lothar Matthäus described Brehme as the best player he played with.

== Death ==
Brehme died from a cardiac arrest on 20 February 2024 at the age of 63.

== Career statistics ==
=== Club ===
Appearances and goals by club, season and competition
Club	Season	League			National cup		Continental		Super cup		Total	
Club	Season	Division	Apps	Goals	Apps	Goals	Apps	Goals	Apps	Goals	Apps	Goals
1. FC Saarbrücken	1980–81	2. Bundesliga	36	3	2	0	—		—		38	3
1. FC Kaiserslautern	1981–82	Bundesliga	27	4	—		7	1	—		34	5
1. FC Kaiserslautern	1982–83	Bundesliga	30	3	1	0	5	3	—		36	6
1. FC Kaiserslautern	1983–84	Bundesliga	33	8	2	1	2	0	—		37	9
1. FC Kaiserslautern	1984–85	Bundesliga	33	11	1	0	—		—		34	11
1. FC Kaiserslautern	1985–86	Bundesliga	31	8	4	2	—		—		35	10
1. FC Kaiserslautern	Total		154	34	8	3	14	4	—		176	41
Bayern Munich	1986–87	Bundesliga	31	4	2	0	8	0	—		41	4
Bayern Munich	1987–88	Bundesliga	28	3	4	0	6	1	1	0	39	4
Bayern Munich	Total		59	7	6	0	14	1	1	0	80	8
Inter Milan	1988–89	Serie A	31	3	7	0	6	0	—		44	3
Inter Milan	1989–90	Serie A	32	6	4	0	2	0	1	0	39	6
Inter Milan	1990–91	Serie A	23	1	4	1	9	0	—		36	2
Inter Milan	1991–92	Serie A	30	1	4	0	2	0	—		36	1
Inter Milan	Total		116	11	19	1	19	0	1	0	155	12
Real Zaragoza	1992–93	La Liga	24	1	2	1	5	2	—		31	4
1. FC Kaiserslautern	1993–94	Bundesliga	26	3	3	1	—		—		29	4
1. FC Kaiserslautern	1994–95	Bundesliga	27	4	3	2	4	0	—		34	6
1. FC Kaiserslautern	1995–96	Bundesliga	30	2	5	0	4	0	—		39	2
1. FC Kaiserslautern	1996–97	2. Bundesliga	32	0	—		2	0	1	0	35	0
1. FC Kaiserslautern	1997–98	Bundesliga	5	0	1	0	—		—		6	0
1. FC Kaiserslautern	Total		120	9	12	3	10	0	1	0	143	12
Career total			509	65	49	8	62	7	3	0	623	80

=== International ===
Appearances and goals by national team and year
National team	Year	Apps	Goals
Germany	1984	11	1
Germany	1985	9	1
Germany	1986	8	1
Germany	1987	5	0
Germany	1988	9	1
Germany	1989	5	0
Germany	1990	13	4
Germany	1991	6	0
Germany	1992	8	0
Germany	1993	3	0
Germany	1994	9	0
Total		86	8

Scores and results list Germany's goal tally first, score column indicates score after each Brehme goal.

List of international goals scored by Andreas Brehme
No.	Date	Venue	Opponent	Score	Result	Competition
1	28 March 1984	Hanover, West Germany	Soviet Union	2–1	2–1	Friendly
2	17 November 1985	Munich, West Germany	Czechoslovakia	1–0	2–2	Friendly
3	25 June 1986	Guadalajara, México	France	1–0	2–0	1986 FIFA World Cup
4	10 June 1988	Düsseldorf, West Germany	Italy	1–1	1–1	UEFA Euro 1988
5	24 June 1990	Milan, Italy	Netherlands	2–0	2–1	1990 FIFA World Cup
6	4 July 1990	Turin, Italy	England	1–0	1–1 (a.e.t.), 4–3 (pen.)	1990 FIFA World Cup
7	8 July 1990	Rome, Italy	Argentina	1–0	1–0	1990 FIFA World Cup
8	10 October 1990	Stockholm, Sweden	Sweden	3–0	3–1	Friendly

=== Coaching record ===
Team	From	To	Record					Ref.
Team	From	To	M	W	D	L	Win %	Ref.
1. FC Kaiserslautern	6 October 2000	25 August 2002	79	38	11	30	48.10	
SpVgg Unterhaching	1 July 2004	10 March 2005	30	11	3	16	36.67	
Total			109	49	14	46	44.95	—

== Honours ==
1. FC Kaiserslautern

- Bundesliga: 1997–98
- 2. Bundesliga: 1996–97
- DFB-Pokal: 1995–96
- DFL-Supercup: runner-up 1996

Bayern Munich

- Bundesliga: 1986–87
- European Cup: runner-up 1986–87
- DFL-Supercup: 1987

Inter Milan

- Serie A: 1988–89
- Supercoppa Italiana: 1989
- UEFA Cup: 1990–91

Real Zaragoza

- Copa del Rey: runner-up 1992–93

Germany

- FIFA World Cup: 1990; runner-up 1986
- UEFA Euro: runner-up 1992

Individual

- FIFA World Cup All-Star Team: 1990
- UEFA European Championship Team of the Tournament: 1984, 1992
- kicker Bundesliga Team of the Season: 1985–86
- Onze Mondial: 1987, 1990
- Guerin d'Oro (Serie A Footballer of the Year): 1989
- Pirata d'Oro (Internazionale Player of the Year): 1989
- Ballon d'Or – Third place: 1990

Sporting positions
Preceded by Lothar Matthäus	Germany captain 1992	Succeeded by Lothar Matthäus
