= Roger Lutz =

German footballer (born 1964)

Personal information
- Date of birth: 15 July 1964 (age 62)
- Place of birth: Linden, Kaiserslautern, West Germany
- Height: 1.82 m (6 ft 0 in)
- Position: Defender

Team information
- Current team: 1. FC Kaiserslautern (Team coordinator)

Youth career
- FV Linden
- –1988: FK Clausen

Senior career*
Years	Team	Apps	(Gls)
1988–2000	1. FC Kaiserslautern	104	(1)
2000–2003	Dudelange	72	(1)
Total		176	(2)

Managerial career
- 2003–2005: Jeunesse Esch
- 2005–2007: SC Hauenstein
- 2007–2011: 1. FC Kaiserslautern (assistant)
- * Club domestic league appearances and goals

Roger Lutz (born 15 July 1964) is a former German professional footballer who played as a defender.

== Career ==
Born in Linden, Kaiserslautern, Lutz began playing football with local side FV Linden. He later moved from FK Clausen to 1. FC Kaiserslautern in 1988, where he spent the rest of his Bundesliga career up to 2000. Lutz along with his brother Jürgen Lutz, interrupted his professional career in favor of his studies and thus gave up voluntarily on his best years as a professional to obtain a diploma in civil engineering (playing as an amateur during the time). Then he returned to win his second German championship. Together with his cousin Kai, who is also a well-known football player in the region, he operates an engineering office.

Lutz won the German championship twice (1991, 1998) and twice the DFB-Pokal (1990, 1996). Alongside Axel Roos, he is the most successful FCK player in terms of titles won. He finished his playing career in Luxembourg with the F91 Dudelange. From 2002 to 2004, Lutz served on the supervisory board of the FCK.

Since 2004, he worked as manager at F91 Dudelange, Jeunesse Esch and SC Hauenstein. From June 2007 to February 2008, he worked as assistant to manager Kjetil Rekdal at 1. FC Kaiserslautern. Shortly after his release he was hired again as an assistant to the new manager Milan Šašić.

== Honours ==
1. FC Kaiserslautern

- Bundesliga: 1990–91, 1997–98
- DFB-Pokal: 1989–90, 1995–96
- DFL-Supercup: 1991
