= Jürgen Rische =

German footballer and coach

Personal information
- Date of birth: 30 October 1970 (age 56)
- Place of birth: Oschatz, East Germany
- Height: 1.77 m (5 ft 10 in)
- Position: Striker

Youth career
- 1977–1983: BSG Glasseide Oschatz
- 1983–1987: Lokomotive Leipzig

Senior career*
Years	Team	Apps	(Gls)
1987–1996	VfB Leipzig	211	(60)
1996–1999	1. FC Kaiserslautern	108	(27)
2000–2002	VfL Wolfsburg	47	(9)
2002–2007	Eintracht Braunschweig	159	(27)
Total		525	(123)

International career
1985–1989	East Germany Youth		
1989	East Germany Olympic		

Managerial career
- 2009–: Eintracht Braunschweig (assistant)
- * Club domestic league appearances and goals

Jürgen Rische (born 30 October 1970) is a retired German football striker and current coach.

He played for 1. FC Lokomotive (later VfB) Leipzig, 1. FC Kaiserslautern, VfL Wolfsburg and Eintracht Braunschweig. Rische scored together more than 100 goals in Oberliga, Bundesliga and 2. Bundesliga. He was a part of the East German squad at the 1989 FIFA World Youth Championship, playing one match.

Since 2009, he works as assistant coach at Eintracht Braunschweig.

== Honours ==
- Bundesliga: 1997–98
- DFB-Pokal: 1995–96
