= Martin Wagner (footballer, born 1968) =

German footballer

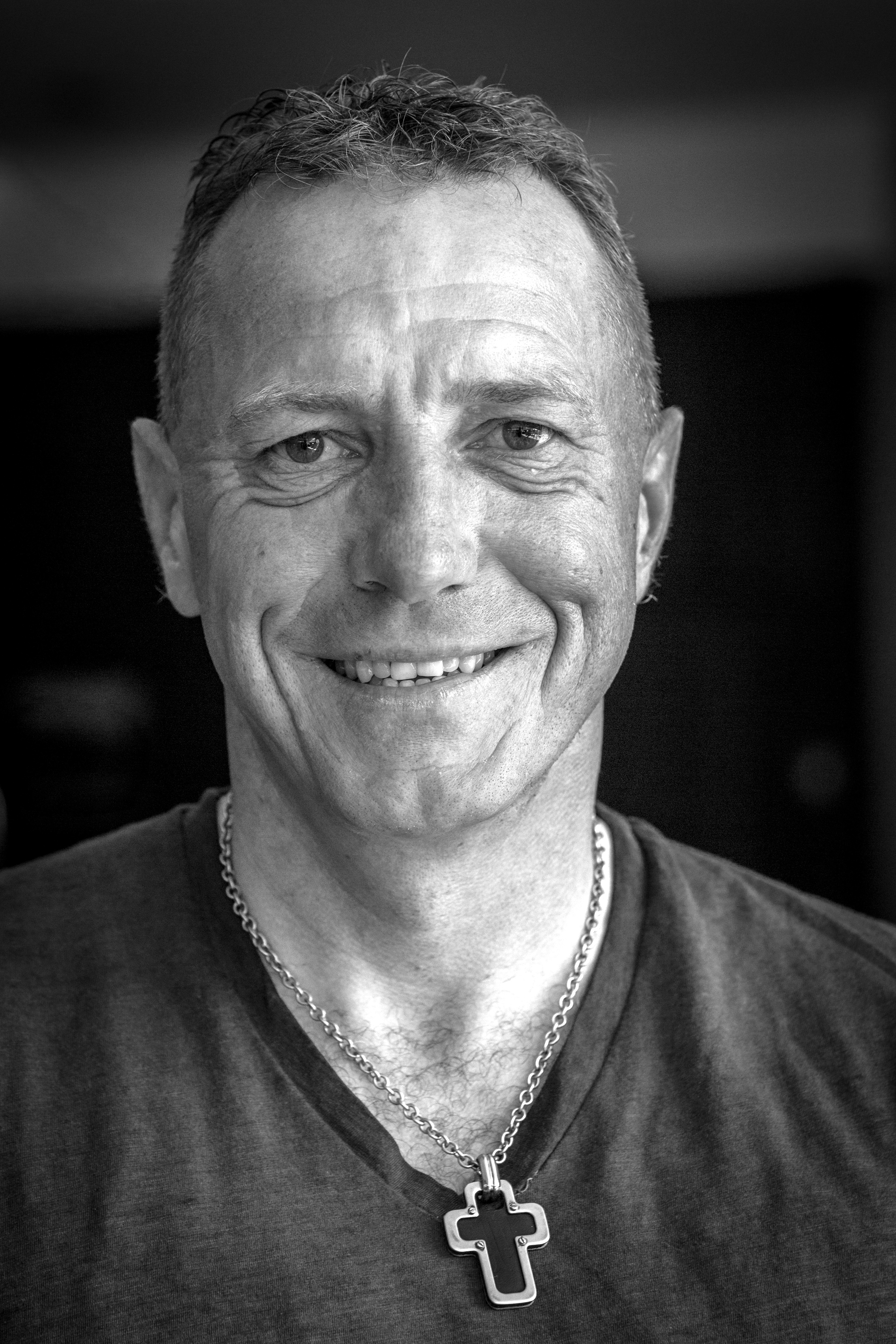

Personal information
- Date of birth: 24 February 1968 (age 58)
- Place of birth: Offenburg, West Germany
- Height: 1.75 m (5 ft 9 in)
- Positions: Midfielder; full back

Youth career
- Kehl
- Offenburg

Senior career*
Years	Team	Apps	(Gls)
1988–1992	1. FC Nürnberg	100	(14)
1992–2000	1. FC Kaiserslautern	200	(30)
2000–2001	VfL Wolfsburg	2	(0)
Total		302	(44)

International career
1992–1994	Germany	6	(0)
- * Club domestic league appearances and goals

Martin Wagner (born 24 February 1968) is a German former footballer who played as a midfielder or defender. He is currently running the player agency MaWa Consult.

== Career ==
He played over 300 league matches in the first and second division of the German league pyramid. Two of his six caps for Germany Wagner won during the 1994 World Cup in the knockout stage.

== Honours ==
=== Club ===
1. FC Kaiserslautern

- Bundesliga: 1997–98
- DFB-Pokal: 1995–96
- 2. Bundesliga: 1996–97
