= Olaf Marschall =

German footballer (born 1966)

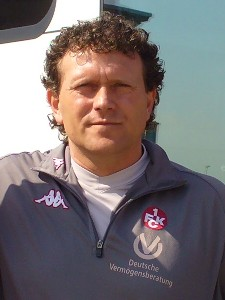
- Marschall in 2005

Personal information
- Date of birth: 19 March 1966 (age 60)
- Place of birth: Torgau, East Germany
- Height: 1.86 m (6 ft 1 in)
- Position: Forward

Youth career
- 1972–1978: BSG Chemie Torgau
- 1978–1983: 1. FC Lok Leipzig

Senior career*
Years	Team	Apps	(Gls)
1983–1990	1. FC Lok Leipzig	135	(43)
1990–1993	SCN Admira/Wacker	97	(40)
1993–1994	Dynamo Dresden	32	(11)
1994–2002	1. FC Kaiserslautern	160	(59)
2002	Al-Ittihad	12	(5)

International career
	East Germany U-21	18	(7)
1984–1989	East Germany	4	(0)
1994–1999	Germany	13	(3)

Managerial career
- 2005–2007: 1. FC Kaiserslautern (assistant)
- * Club domestic league appearances and goals

Olaf Marschall (born 19 March 1966) is a German former professional footballer who played as a forward.

His professional career began in the DDR-Oberliga at 1. FC Lokomotive Leipzig, with whom he reached the final of the 1987 UEFA Cup Winners' Cup. In 1990 he went to FC Admira Wacker Mödling in Austria and in 1993 to Dynamo Dresden in the German Bundesliga. In 1998 he became German champion with 1. FC Kaiserslautern. With the Germany national team, he took part in the 1998 World Cup in France. Previously, he had been active in the GDR national team.

== Club career ==
=== Start and first successes in the GDR (1972–1990) ===
Marschall started playing soccer in the GDR at BSG Chemie Torgau and was soon transferred to 1. FC Lok Leipzig. There, he rose to stardom, becoming one of the most prolific scorers in the East German top-flight in the turbulent late 1980s and collecting caps for the East German football squad. There he made his debut in the DDR-Oberliga on 22 October 1983, at the age of 17, against Dynamo Dresden (2–2), when he was substituted on by his coach Harro Miller in the 62nd minute for Hans Richter. Under Miller's successor Hans-Ulrich Thomale, he became a regular player, although his goal quota varied greatly from season to season. In 1987 he reached the final of the UEFA Cup Winners' Cup with his club. In 1986 and 1987 he won the FDGB Cup with Leipzig, in 1986 and 1988 he was runner-up with his club in the GDR Oberliga. Marschall was regarded as a strong header which deft ballhandling skills, allowing him to play center-striker, hole and offensive midfield with equal effectiveness. He scored 43 goals in 135 Oberliga matches.

=== In Austria at FC Admira Wacker (1990–1993) ===
In the wake of the German reunification he joined Austrian outfit SCN Admira/Wacker in 1990 to stay on in Austria's Bundesliga, until he joined Dynamo Dresden to help the East German outfit escape relegation from the German Bundesliga in 1993–94. Under the coaches Thomas Parits and Sigfried Held, the team achieved sixth, fourth and third place during this period. Marschall's performances also increased from year to year – in 1992/93 he was the second-best scorer in the Austrian Football Bundesliga with 19 goals with Václav Daněk. In the summer of 1993, he returned to Germany.

=== Dynamo Dresden (1993/94) ===
Marschall moved to his native Saxony because he had signed with SG Dynamo Dresden, which played in the Bundesliga. He followed Siegfried "Siggi" Held, who had been hired there as a coach. In his first game with Dynamo, Marschall met his former club, which had since been renamed VfB Leipzig. Here he was successful with a triple pack (result 3:3). So far (2020), only six other players have managed this feat of scoring three goals in their Bundesliga debut. In total, he scored 11 goals in 32 games in his first Bundesliga season. He was by far the most successful goalscorer in his team and achieved relegation with Dresden, although the team had been deducted four points by the DFB. For financial reasons, the club sold the striker after just one year to runners-up 1. FC Kaiserslautern.

=== 1 FC Kaiserslautern (1994–2002) ===
In 1994, he joined 1. FC Kaiserslautern and established himself as one of the elite scorers in the Bundesliga. He won the DFB-Pokal in 1996 and in 1998 the Bundesliga title. Marschall was the Bundesliga second-leading goal-scorer in the 1997–98 season, as he led Kaiserslautern to the title.

By signing Marschall for 2.8 million marks, FCK made the most expensive purchase in the club's history to date. In his first year in the Palatinate, he scored seven times in 26 games and finished fourth with his club. He struggled with injuries the following season and also made eight appearances as a substitute in his 19 games (2 goals). Marschall won the DFB Cup with Kaiserslautern in 1996 after being relegated from the Bundesliga with the Palatinate days earlier. Like almost the entire core of the team, he remained loyal to the club after being relegated to the second division and scored ten goals in 16 games, where he again had to take a break of almost six months due to injury.

After direct resurgence in 1997, he won the German championship in 1998 with Otto Rehhagel's team, where Marschall scored 21 goals in just 24 games. He finished second in the top scorers list that season, behind Ulf Kirsten, a goal behind. Again, bad luck with injuries prevented further appearances and a possibly even higher goal quota. By this time at the latest, Marshal had become a crowd favorite with the Palatinate. His partner in attack at that time was often Jürgen Rische, his former teammate at Lok Leipzig. In 1998/99, Olaf Marschall won the Goal of the Year (Germany) award with an Bicycle kick, scoring 12 goals. While Marschall scored nine goals in the preliminary round and Kaiserslautern was in third place, he only scored three goals in the second half of the season. His club slipped out of the Champions League ranks and eventually finished in fifth place.

From this point on, the striker could no longer build on his successful times. After three mediocre seasons (1999/00 to 2001/02 he only scored seven goals in 47 games) and the loss of his regular place in 2000/01 to the strike duo Miroslav Klose and Vratislav Lokvenc his expiring contract at the end of the 2001/02 season was no longer extended. In his last season at FCK, he was once again euphorically celebrated by the fans when he headed in the decisive goal in the last minute to make it 3–2 against SV Waldhof Mannheim in the second round of the DFB Cup.

At the end of his career, Marshall had an offer from Al-Ittihad in Qatar. A contract did not materialize.

Marschall played for FCK until 2002. He then worked in several capacities at the club, currently (2019) as a scout.

== International career ==
From 1985 to 1989 he played four times (no goal) for the East Germany national team. He made his debut on 6 February 1985 in East Germany's 3–2 victory over Ecuador. After reunification, he played for the Germany national team in 1994 and from 1997 to 1999. He scored three goals in 13 appearances. He played his first game for the DFB and his only one in 1994 on October 12 in a 0–0 friendly against Hungary. Marschall came on for Fredi Bobic in the 85th minute of the game. Looking back on a remarkable scoring record in 1997–98, Marschall was nominated for the German squad. He took part in the 1998 FIFA World Cup in France with the national team. He was used here once; in the quarterfinals against Croatia he came on for Dietmar Hamann in the 79th minute when the score was 0–1 (result: 0–3).

List of international goals scored by Olaf Marschall
No.	Date	Venue	Opponent	Score	Result	Competition
1	11 October 1997	Niedersachsenstadion, Hanover, Germany	Albania	3–2	4–3	1998 World Cup qualifier
2	22 February 1998	King Fahd International Stadium, Riyadh, Saudi Arabia	Saudi Arabia	3–0	3–0	Friendly
3	18 November 1998	Parkstadion, Gelsenkirchen, Germany	Netherlands	1–1	1–1	Friendly

== Managerial and coaching career ==
Marschall returned to the Fritz-Walter-Stadion in January 2004 to act as executive assistant to the then chairman René C. Jäggi. From June 2004 to June 2006 he worked as a team manager at 1. FC Kaiserslautern. He then completed an internship at the FCK youth center at the "Fröhnerhof" and became assistant coach of the Lauterer amateur team in August 2006. First, he worked under interim coach Kosta Runjaić, then under Alois Reinhardt, who resigned at the end of October. Marschall then became interim coach of the second team for two months and then left the club. In the meantime, after Kurt Jara was dismissed as FCK coach, he was assistant coach of the first team until the end of the 2004/05 season.

After his activities at FCK, Marschall devoted himself to acquiring a coaching license at the Hennes-Weisweiler Academy of the German Sport University Cologne, during which he completed a two-week internship in Hanover with the 96 team around the then 96 coach Dieter Hecking.

== Post-retirement ==
Having retired as a player in 2002, he was part of the management of the then Bundesliga side 1. FC Kaiserslautern. Ahead of 2006–07 he joined Al-Nasr Sports Club Dubai to work as assistant-manager under manager Reiner Hollmann.

Marschall is now the first scout with the German club FSV Frankfurt.

== Achievements and awards ==
=== Locomotive Leipzig ===
- FDGB-Pokal: 1986, 1987
- Finalist in UEFA Cup Winners' Cup: 1987

=== 1. FC Kaiserslautern ===
- German football championship: 1998
- DFB-Pokal: 1996

=== Personal ===
- Goal scorer of Goal of the Year (Germany): 1998
- Election to the "Admira Century Eleven" of FC Admira Wacker Mödling
