= Pavel Kuka =

Czech footballer (born 1968)

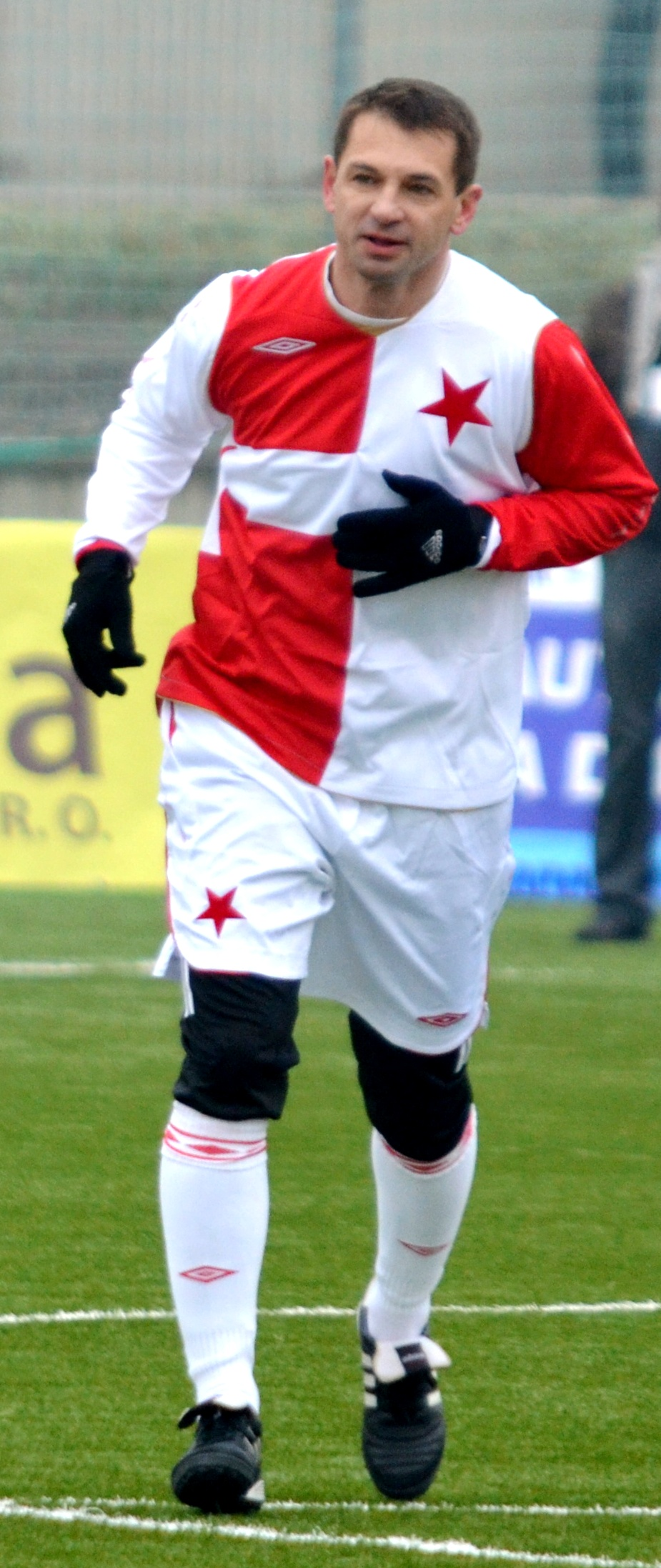
- Kuka in 2013

Personal information
- Date of birth: 19 July 1968 (age 58)
- Place of birth: Prague, Czechoslovakia
- Height: 1.83 m (6 ft 0 in)
- Position: Forward

Youth career
- 1975–1987: Slavia Prague

Senior career*
Years	Team	Apps	(Gls)
1987–1989	Rudá Hvězda Cheb	36	(9)
1989–1993	Slavia Prague	125	(63)
1994–1998	1. FC Kaiserslautern	121	(53)
1998–1999	1. FC Nürnberg	28	(10)
1999–2000	VfB Stuttgart	20	(1)
2000–2005	Slavia Prague	110	(33)
Total		440	(169)

International career
1991–1993	Czechoslovakia	24	(7)
1994–2001	Czech Republic	63	(22)
Medal record
Men's football
Representing Czech Republic
UEFA European Championship
Runner-up	1996 England
FIFA Confederations Cup
Third place	1997 Saudi Arabia
- * Club domestic league appearances and goals

Pavel Kuka (born 19 July 1968) is a Czech former professional footballer who played as a forward. He represented his national team on 87 occasions, scoring 29 goals. At club level Kuka started in 1987 with Rudá Hvězda Cheb in the Czechoslovak First League before transferring to Slavia Prague two years later. During the 1993–94 season he moved to Germany, where he played in the Bundesliga for 1. FC Kaiserslautern, 1. FC Nürnberg and VfB Stuttgart. In 2000 he returned to Slavia, where he spent a further five years before retiring from top-level football in 2005.

== Club career ==
Born in Prague, Kuka played for Rudá Hvězda Cheb and Slavia Prague, making a combined total of 149 appearances, scoring 66 goals, in the last six seasons of the Czechoslovak First League (1987–93). He then moved to Germany, playing for 1. FC Kaiserslautern (1994–98), 1. FC Nürnberg (1998–99), and VfB Stuttgart (1999–2000). Following his time in Germany, Kuka returned to Slavia Prague, where he played for five more seasons before retiring at the end of the 2004–05 season. His final game for Slavia took place on 28 May 2005, in a Czech First League match against Baník Ostrava.

== International career ==
Kuka scored 29 goals across 87 national team appearances for Czechoslovakia and the Czech Republic. For the Czech Republic national team, Kuka played 63 times, scoring 22 goals He was part of the runner-up squad at UEFA Euro 1996 as well as the 2000 tournament.

== Personal life ==
Kuka has a son, Tomáš, and a daughter, Aneta, from a past relationship with sports television presenter Renata Dlouhá.

== Career statistics ==
=== Czechoslovakia ===
Appearances and goals by national team and year
National team	Year	Apps	Goals
Czechoslovakia	1990	2	1
Czechoslovakia	1991	9	3
Czechoslovakia	1992	6	2
Czechoslovakia	1993	7	1
Total		24	7

Scores and results list Czechoslovakia's goal tally first, score column indicates score after each Kuka goal.

List of international goals scored by Pavel Kuka
No.	Date	Venue	Opponent	Score	Result	Competition	Ref.
1	29 August 1990	Kuusankosken Urheilupuisto, Kuusankoski, Finland	Finland	1-1	1-1	Friendly	
2	27 March 1991	Andrův stadion, Olomouc, Czechoslovakia	Poland	1-0	4-0	Friendly	
3	1 May 1991	Arena Kombëtare, Tirana, Albania	Albania	2-0	2-0	UEFA Euro 1992 qualification	
4	25 September 1991	Ullevaal Stadion, Oslo, Norway	Norway	3-2	3-2	Friendly	
5	23 September 1992	Všešportový areál, Košice, Czechoslovakia	Faroe Islands	2-0	4-0	1994 FIFA World Cup qualification	
6	23 September 1992	Všešportový areál, Košice, Czechoslovakia	Faroe Islands	3-0	4-0	1994 FIFA World Cup qualification	
7	8 September 1993	Cardiff Arms Park, Cardiff, Wales	Wales	1-0	2-2	1994 FIFA World Cup qualification	

=== Czech Republic ===
Appearances and goals by national team and year
National team	Year	Apps	Goals
Czech Republic	1994	8	4
Czech Republic	1995	7	1
Czech Republic	1996	13	8
Czech Republic	1997	11	3
Czech Republic	1998	4	1
Czech Republic	1999	9	1
Czech Republic	2000	5	1
Czech Republic	2001	6	3
Total		63	22

Scores and results list Czech Republic's goal tally first, score column indicates score after each Kuka goal.

List of international goals scored by Pavel Kuka
No.	Date	Venue	Opponent	Score	Result	Competition	Ref.
1	25 May 1994	Bazaly, Ostrava, Czech Republic	Lithuania	1-0	5-3	Friendly	
2	25 May 1994	Bazaly, Ostrava, Czech Republic	Lithuania	4-0	5-3	Friendly	
3	5 June 1994	Lansdowne Road, Dublin, Republic of Ireland	Republic of Ireland	1-0	3-1	Friendly	
4	5 June 1994	Lansdowne Road, Dublin, Republic of Ireland	Republic of Ireland	2-1	3-1	Friendly	
5	29 March 1995	Bazaly, Ostrava, Czech Republic	Belarus	4-1	4-2	UEFA Euro 1996 qualification	
6	26 March 1996	Městský stadion, Ostrava, Czech Republic	Turkey	2-0	3-0	Friendly	
7	26 March 1996	Městský stadion, Ostrava, Czech Republic	Turkey	3-0	3-0	Friendly	
8	24 April 1996	Great Strahov Stadium, Prague, Czech Republic	Republic of Ireland	2-0	2-0	Friendly	
9	1 June 1996	St. Jakob-Park, Basel, Switzerland	Switzerland	1-0	2-1	Friendly	
10	1 June 1996	St. Jakob-Park, Basel, Switzerland	Switzerland	2-0	2-1	Friendly	
11	19 June 1996	Anfield, Liverpool, England	Russia	2-0	3-3	UEFA Euro 1996	
12	4 September 1996	Stadion Střelnice, Jablonec nad Nisou, Czech Republic	Iceland	1-1	2-1	Friendly	
13	4 September 1996	Stadion Střelnice, Jablonec nad Nisou, Czech Republic	Iceland	2-1	2-1	Friendly	
14	12 March 1997	Bazaly, Ostrava, Czech Republic	Poland	1-0	2-1	Friendly	
15	20 August 1997	Na Stínadlech, Teplice, Czech Republic	Faroe Islands	1-0	2-0	1998 FIFA World Cup qualification	
16	6 September 1997	Svangaskarð, Toftir, Faroe Islands	Faroe Islands	2-0	2-0	1998 FIFA World Cup qualification	
17	10 October 1998	Koševo City Stadium, Sarajevo, Bosnia and Herzegovina	Bosnia and Herzegovina	3-1	3-1	UEFA Euro 2000 qualification	
18	9 June 1999	Stadion Letná, Prague, Czech Republic	Scotland	2-2	3-2	UEFA Euro 2000 qualification	
19	3 June 2000	Max-Morlock-Stadion, Nuremberg, Germany	Germany	1-1	2-3	Friendly	
20	28 February 2001	Toše Proeski Arena, Skopje, North Macedonia	North Macedonia	1-1	1-1	Friendly	
21	6 June 2001	Na Stínadlech, Teplice, Czech Republic	Northern Ireland	1-0	3-1	2002 FIFA World Cup qualification	
22	6 June 2001	Na Stínadlech, Teplice, Czech Republic	Northern Ireland	2-1	3-1	2002 FIFA World Cup qualification	

== Honours ==
1. FC Kaiserslautern

- Bundesliga: 1997–98; runner-up: 1993–94
- 2. Bundesliga: 1996–97
- DFB-Pokal: 1995–96

Czech Republic

- UEFA European Championship runner-up: 1996
- FIFA Confederations Cup Third place: 1997

Individual

- Czech Footballer of the Year: 1994
