= Axel Roos =

German footballer and manager

Personal information
- Date of birth: 19 August 1964 (age 62)
- Place of birth: Rodalben, West Germany
- Height: 1.76 m (5 ft 9 in)
- Position: Defender

Youth career
- –1979: TuS Thaleischweiler-Fröschen
- 1979–1984: 1. FC Kaiserslautern

Senior career*
Years	Team	Apps	(Gls)
1984–2001	1. FC Kaiserslautern	328	(19)

Managerial career
- 2003–2006: Albania (assistant)
- * Club domestic league appearances and goals

Axel Roos (born 19 August 1964) is a German football coach and a former player.

Born in Rodalben, Roos started his professional career in 1984 when he first signed a contract for the Bundesliga-Team 1. FC Kaiserslautern. He went on to win the Bundesliga in 1991 and 1998, the DFB-Pokal in 1990 and 1996, as well as the Supercup in 1991. Roos was loyal to his team throughout his entire professional career.

From 2003 to 2006 Ross was assistant coach to Hans-Peter Briegel at the Albania national team. Since 2007 he runs a football school.

== Honours ==
1. FC Kaiserslautern

- Bundesliga: 1990–91, 1997–98; runner-up 1993–94
- DFB-Pokal: 1989–90, 1995–96
- DFB-Supercup: 1991
