= Oliver Schäfer =

German footballer

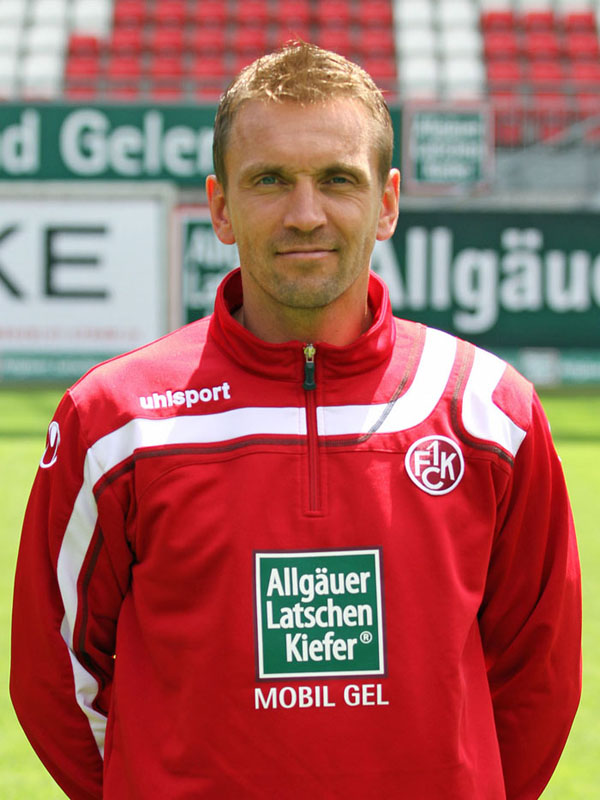
- Schäfer in 2011

Personal information
- Date of birth: 27 February 1969 (age 57)
- Place of birth: Lahr, West Germany
- Height: 1.78 m (5 ft 10 in)
- Position: Defender

Team information
- Current team: 1. FC Kaiserslautern (assistant manager)

Youth career
- VfR Allmannsweier
- 1988–1989: Freiburger FC

Senior career*
Years	Team	Apps	(Gls)
1989–1991	SC Freiburg	71	(0)
1991–1999	1. FC Kaiserslautern	157	(1)
1999–2000	Beşiktaş	28	(2)
2000–2002	Hannover 96	32	(1)
2002–2004	1. FC Saarbrücken	47	(1)
2004–2007	1. FC Kaiserslautern II	67	(0)
Total		402	(5)
- * Club domestic league appearances and goals

Oliver Schäfer (born 27 February 1969) is a German former professional footballer who played as a defender. After his retirement as a player, he has taken up several coaching roles.

== Honours ==
1. FC Kaiserslautern

- DFL-Supercup: 1991
- Bundesliga: 1998; runners-up 1994
- DFB-Pokal: 1996

Beşiktaş

- Süper Lig runners-up: 2000
