= 1996–97 2. Bundesliga =

23rd season of the second-tier football league in Germany

2. Bundesliga
- Season: 1996–97
- Champions: 1. FC Kaiserslautern
- Promoted: 1. FC Kaiserslautern; VfL Wolfsburg; Hertha BSC
- Relegated: SV Waldhof Mannheim; VfB Lübeck; Rot-Weiss Essen; VfB Oldenburg
- Matches: 306
- Top goalscorer: Angelo Vier (18 goals)
- Average attendance: 8,952

The 1996–97 2. Bundesliga season was the twenty-third season of the 2. Bundesliga, the second tier of the German football league system.

1. FC Kaiserslautern, VfL Wolfsburg and Hertha BSC were promoted to the Bundesliga while SV Waldhof Mannheim, VfB Lübeck, Rot-Weiss Essen and VfB Oldenburg were relegated to the Regionalliga.

== League table ==
For the 1996–97 season VfB Oldenburg, Rot-Weiss Essen, FC Gütersloh and Stuttgarter Kickers were newly promoted to the 2. Bundesliga from the Regionalliga while 1. FC Kaiserslautern, Eintracht Frankfurt and KFC Uerdingen 05 had been relegated to the league from the Bundesliga.

Locations of the participating teams of the 1996–97 season

Pos	Team	Pld	W	D	L	GF	GA	GD	Pts	Promotion or relegation
1	1. FC Kaiserslautern (C, P)	34	19	11	4	74	28	+46	68	Promotion to Bundesliga
2	VfL Wolfsburg (P)	34	14	16	4	52	29	+23	58	Promotion to Bundesliga
3	Hertha BSC (P)	34	17	7	10	57	38	+19	58	Promotion to Bundesliga
4	Mainz 05	34	14	12	8	50	34	+16	54	
5	Stuttgarter Kickers	34	14	11	9	38	27	+11	53	
6	SpVgg Unterhaching	34	11	16	7	35	29	+6	49	
7	Eintracht Frankfurt	34	13	9	12	43	46	−3	48	
8	VfB Leipzig	34	12	10	12	53	54	−1	46	
9	KFC Uerdingen	34	13	5	16	46	44	+2	44	
10	SV Meppen	34	10	14	10	44	48	−4	44	
11	Fortuna Köln	34	11	9	14	52	47	+5	42	
12	Carl Zeiss Jena	34	9	15	10	44	49	−5	42	
13	FC Gütersloh	34	12	9	13	43	51	−8	42 (Note: FC Gütersloh have been deducted three points for providing false details regarding the licensing process.)	
14	FSV Zwickau	34	12	6	16	34	48	−14	42	
15	Waldhof Mannheim (R)	34	10	10	14	45	56	−11	40	Relegation to Regionalliga (Note: VfB Lübeck, and VfB Oldenburg were relegated to Regionalliga Nord. Waldhof Mannheim was relegated to Regionalliga Süd. Rot-Weiss Essen was relegated to Regionalliga Südwest.)
16	VfB Lübeck (R)	34	8	12	14	32	53	−21	36	Relegation to Regionalliga
17	Rot-Weiss Essen (R)	34	8	5	21	47	74	−27	29	Relegation to Regionalliga
18	VfB Oldenburg (R)	34	6	9	19	33	67	−34	27	Relegation to Regionalliga

Source: Bundesliga.de
Rules for classification: 1) points; 2) goal difference; 3) number of goals scored.
(C) Champions; (P) Promoted; (R) Relegated

== Results ==
Home \ Away	BSC	RWE	SGE	FCG	JEN	FCK	FKO	LEI	LUE	M05	WMA	SVM	OLD	SKI	KFC	UNT	WOB	ZWI
Hertha BSC	—	7–3	1–2	5–2	0–1	2–0	4–2	1–1	0–0	1–0	2–2	3–0	1–0	0–1	0–2	3–0	1–0	1–0
Rot-Weiss Essen	2–1	—	4–1	2–2	0–2	1–4	0–4	4–1	2–0	0–2	2–1	2–1	5–0	0–4	1–2	1–2	0–1	1–2
Eintracht Frankfurt	3–1	3–0	—	2–0	1–1	0–0	3–1	2–3	3–0	1–0	1–0	0–1	2–3	0–1	0–1	1–0	1–1	2–1
FC Gütersloh	1–0	2–3	3–1	—	0–0	1–1	1–0	2–0	3–1	0–0	0–0	4–2	1–0	1–0	1–1	1–1	1–1	3–1
Carl Zeiss Jena	2–1	4–0	1–1	2–5	—	2–2	1–1	0–0	1–1	2–1	1–1	2–1	3–1	0–0	2–2	1–1	3–3	2–1
1. FC Kaiserslautern	0–0	3–2	5–0	2–0	2–0	—	2–0	4–1	7–0	1–1	5–0	7–6	6–2	2–0	3–1	0–0	4–0	4–1
Fortuna Köln	2–0	1–1	0–0	3–0	2–0	0–0	—	2–3	0–3	1–3	4–0	0–0	7–1	1–2	1–2	3–1	2–0	2–1
VfB Leipzig	0–3	2–0	2–3	3–1	3–3	2–2	4–1	—	0–0	3–0	6–1	1–3	0–0	0–0	3–1	3–0	0–2	4–0
VfB Lübeck	1–4	3–2	1–1	2–3	1–0	0–2	1–1	0–1	—	0–2	2–3	4–1	2–0	1–0	2–0	0–0	0–0	1–1
Mainz 05	0–1	2–1	2–2	3–0	3–2	0–0	2–0	2–1	1–1	—	2–0	3–0	3–0	1–0	3–1	0–0	0–0	1–1
Waldhof Mannheim	2–1	3–3	1–2	1–0	4–0	2–0	3–3	1–1	3–1	2–2	—	1–0	2–0	0–1	1–0	1–1	1–3	4–0
SV Meppen	1–1	1–1	1–1	2–0	0–0	2–1	0–3	0–0	2–0	5–4	1–1	—	2–1	1–1	2–0	1–1	0–0	3–0
VfB Oldenburg	2–2	2–1	1–2	2–0	1–0	0–1	1–1	4–1	1–1	1–1	1–0	1–1	—	1–1	1–2	1–3	1–4	1–2
Stuttgarter Kickers	1–2	1–1	0–0	1–1	1–2	0–2	3–1	3–1	2–3	2–1	2–1	0–0	5–0	—	1–0	1–0	0–0	1–0
KFC Uerdingen	2–3	1–0	3–0	0–2	2–2	0–1	1–2	5–0	5–0	0–1	4–1	0–0	1–0	3–1	—	0–4	0–3	3–0
SpVgg Unterhaching	1–2	2–0	2–1	3–1	2–1	0–0	0–0	1–1	0–0	0–0	2–1	1–2	1–1	1–1	0–0	—	1–0	2–1
VfL Wolfsburg	1–1	5–1	4–1	3–0	4–1	0–0	2–1	2–0	0–0	5–4	1–1	3–1	2–2	0–0	1–0	0–0	—	1–1
FSV Zwickau	1–2	2–1	1–0	3–1	1–0	2–1	2–0	1–2	2–0	0–0	2–0	1–1	1–0	0–1	2–1	0–2	0–0	—

Source: DFB
Legend: Blue = home team win; Yellow = draw; Red = away team win.

== Top scorers ==
The league's top scorers:

Goals	Player	Team
18	(Germany) Angelo Vier	Rot-Weiss Essen
17	(Germany) Steffen Heidrich	VfB Leipzig
15	(Germany) Axel Kruse	Hertha BSC Berlin
14	(Czech Republic) Pavel Kuka	1. FC Kaiserslautern
13	(Germany) Christian Claaßen	SV Meppen
12	(Morocco) Abderrahim Ouakili	1. FSV Mainz 05
12	(Germany) Jürgen Rische	1. FC Kaiserslautern
11	(Germany) Rainer Krieg	Fortuna Köln
10	(Germany) Sven Demandt	1. FSV Mainz 05
10	(Germany) Horst Elberfeld	VfB Oldenburg
10	(Germany) Wolfram Klein	Rot-Weiss Essen
10	(Germany) Olaf Marschall	1. FC Kaiserslautern
10	(Netherlands) Dirk van der Ven	FC Gütersloh
10	(Germany) Mark Zimmermann	FC Carl Zeiss Jena
