= 1997–98 Bundesliga =

35th season of the Bundesliga

Bundesliga
- Season: 1997–98
- Dates: 1 August 1997 – 9 May 1998
- Champions: 1. FC Kaiserslautern; 2nd Bundesliga title 4th German title
- Relegated: Karlsruher SC; 1. FC Köln; Arminia Bielefeld
- Champions League: 1. FC Kaiserslautern; Bayern Munich
- Cup Winners' Cup: MSV Duisburg (domestic cup finalists)
- UEFA Cup: Bayer Leverkusen; VfB Stuttgart; Schalke 04
- Intertoto Cup: Hansa Rostock; Werder Bremen
- Matches: 306
- Goals: 853 (2.79 per match)
- Top goalscorer: Ulf Kirsten (22)
- Biggest home win: Leverkusen 6–1 Karlsruhe (23 August 1997); Leverkusen 6–1 Stuttgart (21 December 1997); Leverkusen 5–0 Hamburg (18 April 1998)
- Biggest away win: nine games with a differential of +3 each (2–5 once, 1–4 twice, 0–3 six times)
- Highest scoring: Duisburg 4–5 M'gladbach (9 goals) (31 October 1997)

The 1997–98 Bundesliga was the 35th season of the Bundesliga, Germany's premier football league. It began on 1 August 1997 and ended on 9 May 1998. FC Bayern Munich were the defending champions. FC Kaiserslautern won the Bundesliga on 1 May 1998 with one match remaining, the only time to date that a newly promoted team has won the league.

== Competition modus ==
Every team played two games against each other team, one at home and one away. Teams received three points for a win and one point for a draw. If two or more teams were tied on points, places were determined by goal difference and, if still tied, by goals scored. The team with the most points were crowned champions while the three teams with the fewest points were relegated to 2. Bundesliga.

== Team changes to 1996–97 ==
Fortuna Düsseldorf, SC Freiburg and FC St. Pauli were relegated to the 2. Bundesliga after finishing in the last three places. They were replaced by 1. FC Kaiserslautern, VfL Wolfsburg and Hertha BSC.

== Season overview ==
The 1997–98 Bundesliga battle for the championship was fought between FC Bayern Munich and 1. FC Kaiserslautern. Bayern were the defending champions after having won their 14th German title (their 13th Bundesliga title) in the 1996–97 season while Kaiserslautern were re-promoted to the Bundesliga; they had won the 1996–97 2. Bundesliga season with a ten-point margin after their first Bundesliga relegation at the end of the 1995–96 season. Kaiserslautern was coached by Otto Rehhagel who had been sacked as Bayern coach in the spring of 1996.

Coincidentally, the fixture table was such that both clubs met directly at the first match day. At Munich Olympic Stadium, Kaiserslautern achieved a surprising 1–0 away win. After another win (1–0 against Hertha BSC) they were at the top of the league table after matchday two. They regained this top position after matchday four and eventually stayed there until the end of the season. After the end of the first half of the season, Kaiserslautern was four points ahead of Bayern, and while it was expected by many that the second direct encounter at Fritz-Walter-Stadion would be the start of an eventual change at the top, FCK again beat Bayern, this time 2–0, resulting in a seven-point margin between the two teams after matchday 18. Remarkable matchdays in terms of who would win the championship included round 23 and 24, when Bayern lost two matches in a row, while FCK managed to collect four points. Bayern never overtook Kaiserslautern during the whole season, and after matchday 33, with FCK beating VfL Wolfsburg 4–0 at home while Bayern only achieving a 0–0 draw at MSV Duisburg, Kaiserslautern were the early champions, with four points ahead with only one match remaining. They were the first team in Bundesliga history to win the championship as a newly promoted team.

Another surprise of the season was FC Hansa Rostock who just missed qualification for the UEFA Cup, and all three newly promoted teams avoided relegation. At the bottom of the table, Arminia Bielefeld was the first team to be relegated, while 1. FC Köln had to go down after a 2–2 draw against Bayer Leverkusen in the final match of the season, ending a consecutive 35-year run of Bundesliga seasons for Cologne and leaving Hamburger SV as the "dinosaur" of the league (that is, the only Bundesliga founding member that had never been relegated until 2018). Karlsruher SC left the league after eleven seasons, while Borussia Mönchengladbach escaped relegation on the last matchday.

== Team overview ==
Location of teams in Bundesliga 1997–98

Club	Location	Ground	Capacity
Hertha BSC	Berlin	Olympiastadion	76,000
Arminia Bielefeld	Bielefeld	Stadion Alm	22,512
VfL Bochum	Bochum	Ruhrstadion	36,344
SV Werder Bremen	Bremen	Weserstadion	36,000
Borussia Dortmund	Dortmund	Westfalenstadion	55,000
MSV Duisburg	Duisburg	Wedaustadion	30,128
Hamburger SV	Hamburg	Volksparkstadion	62,000
1. FC Kaiserslautern	Kaiserslautern	Fritz-Walter-Stadion	38,500
Karlsruher SC	Karlsruhe	Wildparkstadion	33,800
1. FC Köln	Cologne	Müngersdorfer Stadion	55,000
Bayer 04 Leverkusen	Leverkusen	BayArena	22,500
Borussia Mönchengladbach	Mönchengladbach	Bökelbergstadion	34,500
TSV 1860 Munich	Munich	Olympiastadion	63,000
FC Bayern Munich	Munich	Olympiastadion	63,000
FC Hansa Rostock	Rostock	Ostseestadion	25,850
FC Schalke 04	Gelsenkirchen	Parkstadion	70,000
VfB Stuttgart	Stuttgart	Gottlieb-Daimler-Stadion	53,700
VfL Wolfsburg	Wolfsburg	VfL-Stadion am Elsterweg	21,600

== League table ==
Pos	Team	Pld	W	D	L	GF	GA	GD	Pts	Qualification or relegation
1	1. FC Kaiserslautern (C)	34	19	11	4	63	39	+24	68	Qualification to Champions League group stage
2	Bayern Munich	34	19	9	6	69	37	+32	66	Qualification to Champions League second qualifying round
3	Bayer Leverkusen	34	14	13	7	66	39	+27	55	Qualification to UEFA Cup first round
4	VfB Stuttgart	34	14	10	10	55	49	+6	52	Qualification to UEFA Cup first round
5	Schalke 04	34	13	13	8	38	32	+6	52	Qualification to UEFA Cup first round
6	Hansa Rostock	34	14	9	11	54	46	+8	51	Qualification to Intertoto Cup third round
7	Werder Bremen	34	14	8	12	43	47	−4	50	Qualification to Intertoto Cup second round
8	MSV Duisburg	34	11	11	12	43	44	−1	44	Qualification to Cup Winners' Cup first round (Note: As domestic cup winners Bayern Munich had qualified for UEFA Champions League, their place in the Cup Winners' Cup was transferred to finalists Duisburg.)
9	Hamburger SV	34	11	11	12	38	46	−8	44	
10	Borussia Dortmund	34	11	10	13	57	55	+2	43	
11	Hertha BSC	34	12	7	15	41	53	−12	43	
12	VfL Bochum	34	11	8	15	41	49	−8	41	
13	1860 Munich	34	11	8	15	43	54	−11	41	
14	VfL Wolfsburg	34	11	6	17	38	54	−16	39	
15	Borussia Mönchengladbach	34	9	11	14	54	59	−5	38	
16	Karlsruher SC (R)	34	9	11	14	48	60	−12	38	Relegation to 2. Bundesliga
17	1. FC Köln (R)	34	10	6	18	49	64	−15	36	Relegation to 2. Bundesliga
18	Arminia Bielefeld (R)	34	8	8	18	43	56	−13	32	Relegation to 2. Bundesliga

Source: www.dfb.de
Rules for classification: 1) points; 2) goal difference; 3) number of goals scored.
(C) Champions; (R) Relegated

== Results ==
Home \ Away	BSC	DSC	BOC	SVW	BVB	DUI	HSV	FCK	KSC	KOE	B04	BMG	M60	FCB	ROS	S04	VFB	WOB
Hertha BSC	—	1–1	2–2	0–2	1–1	1–3	0–2	2–0	3–1	1–0	2–2	2–2	2–0	2–1	1–1	1–4	3–0	1–0
Arminia Bielefeld	1–3	—	0–2	3–0	3–1	3–3	0–3	2–2	2–1	2–1	2–1	3–1	1–1	4–4	0–1	1–1	2–1	0–1
VfL Bochum	2–1	1–0	—	0–1	2–1	0–0	0–0	1–3	3–3	2–1	0–0	3–1	1–0	2–3	1–3	3–0	0–2	2–1
Werder Bremen	0–2	2–1	1–0	—	2–1	2–2	0–0	1–1	2–4	3–0	2–1	1–0	3–3	0–3	1–1	2–1	2–2	3–1
Borussia Dortmund	3–0	3–2	5–2	2–2	—	3–0	0–1	2–2	2–2	3–0	0–1	1–2	2–3	0–2	3–2	2–2	3–1	2–1
MSV Duisburg	0–1	2–1	2–0	2–1	0–0	—	3–0	1–1	1–0	2–2	1–1	4–5	0–2	0–0	0–1	1–0	0–3	2–2
Hamburger SV	1–1	2–0	2–1	2–1	1–3	1–0	—	1–1	3–1	2–1	0–1	2–2	1–2	0–2	0–1	1–1	0–0	1–2
1. FC Kaiserslautern	1–0	3–1	3–0	1–3	1–1	1–0	2–1	—	0–0	3–2	0–3	3–2	1–0	2–0	4–3	3–0	4–3	4–0
Karlsruher SC	0–2	3–1	1–1	3–1	0–1	1–2	0–1	2–4	—	3–1	1–1	2–5	0–0	1–1	3–0	0–0	4–2	2–1
1. FC Köln	2–0	3–5	2–1	2–0	4–2	3–2	1–2	0–0	0–1	—	2–2	3–2	2–3	1–3	0–0	0–2	4–2	5–3
Bayer Leverkusen	0–1	0–0	3–2	4–1	2–2	2–1	5–0	1–1	6–1	4–0	—	1–1	2–2	4–2	1–1	0–0	6–1	2–1
Borussia Mönchengladbach	4–2	0–0	2–1	0–0	1–1	0–3	1–1	1–3	1–1	4–1	2–2	—	5–1	1–1	5–2	0–1	0–0	0–2
1860 Munich	3–1	1–0	0–2	0–1	4–2	0–1	1–1	1–3	2–2	1–0	3–4	2–0	—	2–2	0–1	1–0	1–3	2–1
Bayern Munich	3–0	1–0	0–0	2–0	4–0	3–0	3–0	0–1	1–1	0–2	2–1	3–2	3–1	—	2–0	1–1	3–3	5–2
Hansa Rostock	4–0	2–1	2–2	1–2	3–1	2–1	2–1	2–2	4–2	1–2	1–2	2–0	3–0	1–3	—	4–1	1–1	0–1
Schalke 04	1–0	2–1	2–0	0–1	1–0	1–1	2–2	1–1	2–0	1–0	2–1	2–0	2–0	1–0	0–0	—	3–4	1–1
VfB Stuttgart	4–1	1–0	2–0	1–0	0–0	1–1	5–2	0–1	3–0	1–1	1–0	3–0	1–1	0–3	2–1	0–0	—	2–1
VfL Wolfsburg	2–1	2–0	0–2	1–0	1–4	0–2	1–1	2–1	1–2	1–1	1–0	0–2	1–0	2–3	1–1	0–0	1–0	—

Source: DFB
Legend: Blue = home team win; Yellow = draw; Red = away team win.

== Top goalscorers ==
Rank	Player	Club	Goals
1	(Germany) Ulf Kirsten	Bayer Leverkusen	22
2	(Germany) Olaf Marschall	1. FC Kaiserslautern	21
3	(Switzerland) Stéphane Chapuisat	Borussia Dortmund	14
3	(Germany) Michael Preetz	Hertha BSC	14
5	(Germany) Fredi Bobic	VfB Stuttgart	13
5	(Germany) Carsten Jancker	Bayern Munich	13
5	(Sweden) Jörgen Pettersson	Borussia Mönchengladbach	13
5	(Austria) Toni Polster	1. FC Köln	13
5	(Germany) Roy Präger	VfL Wolfsburg	13
5	(Germany) Bernhard Winkler	1860 Munich	13

== Attendances ==
No.	Team	Attendance	Change	Highest
1	Bayern München	54,529	-6.1%	69,000
2	Borussia Dortmund	54,206	2.1%	55,000
3	Hertha BSC	52,895	201.7%	76,000
4	Schalke 04	50,285	28.5%	71,017
5	VfB Stuttgart	39,582	-6.9%	53,000
6	1. FC Kaiserslautern	38,000	3.6%	38,000
7	TSV 1860	33,624	-13.3%	69,900
8	Hamburger SV	33,105	11.3%	58,000
9	Werder Bremen	30,213	-1.1%	35,883
10	1. FC Köln	29,824	-4.1%	47,000
11	Borussia Mönchengladbach	27,435	-9.0%	34,500
12	Karlsruher SC	26,769	-1.2%	33,600
13	VfL Bochum	26,698	-6.0%	31,500
14	Bayer Leverkusen	22,253	7.3%	22,500
15	Arminia Bielefeld	21,460	1.3%	22,512
16	Hansa Rostock	18,841	-0.7%	24,800
17	VfL Wolfsburg	17,025	179.3%	21,600
18	MSV Duisburg	16,623	-14.4%	30,128

== See also ==
- 1997–98 2. Bundesliga
- 1997–98 DFB-Pokal
