= 1987 FIFA World Youth Championship squads =

FIFA championship roster

Below are the rosters for the 1987 FIFA World Youth Championship tournament in Chile. Those marked in bold went on to earn full international caps.

== Group A ==
=== Australia ===
Head coach: Les Scheinflug

No.	Pos.	Player	Date of birth (age)	Caps	Club
1	GK	Brett Hughes	18 April 1969 (aged 18)		(Australia) Blacktown City
2	DF	David Healey	13 March 1968 (aged 19)		(Australia) Australian Institute of Sport
3	DF	**George Kulcsar**	12 August 1967 (aged 20)		(Australia) St George
4	DF	Kurt Reynolds	29 September 1967 (aged 20)		(Australia) Blacktown City
5	DF	Darren Northam	21 November 1967 (aged 19)		(Australia) Blacktown City
6	MF	John Koch	26 June 1968 (aged 19)		(Australia) Australian Institute of Sport
7	MF	Louis Hristodolou	7 August 1967 (aged 20)		(Australia) Adelaide Hellas
8	MF	**Jason Polak**	9 January 1968 (aged 19)		(Australia) Australian Institute of Sport
9	FW	**Paul Trimboli**	25 February 1969 (aged 18)		(Australia) Sunshine George Cross
10	MF	**Abbas Saad**	1 December 1967 (aged 19)		(Australia) Sydney Olympic
11	FW	John Anastasiadis	13 August 1968 (aged 19)		(Australia) Heidelberg United
12	MF	**Jason Van Blerk**	16 March 1968 (aged 19)		(Australia) Blacktown City
13	FW	**John Markovski**	15 April 1970 (aged 17)		(Australia) Sunshine George Cross
14	MF	Anthony Grbac	30 March 1969 (aged 18)		(Australia) Brunswick Juventus
15	FW	**Alistair Edwards**	21 June 1968 (aged 19)		(Australia) Australian Institute of Sport
16	DF	Craig Moffitt	13 September 1967 (aged 20)		(Australia) St George
17	MF	Ange Postecoglou	3 August 1965 (aged 19)		(Australia) South Melbourne
18	GK	George Bouhoutsos	3 April 1969 (aged 18)		(Australia) St George

=== Chile ===
Head coach: Luis Ibarra

No.	Pos.	Player	Date of birth (age)	Caps	Club
1	GK	Guillermo Velasco	2 June 1968 (aged 19)		(Chile) Everton
2	DF	Mauricio Soto	21 February 1969 (aged 18)		(Chile) Deportes Puerto Montt
3	DF	Carlos Ramírez	26 February 1968 (aged 19)		(Chile) Huachipato
4	DF	Hugo Cortez	3 June 1968 (aged 19)		(Chile) Cobreandino
5	DF	**Javier Margas**	10 May 1969 (aged 18)		(Chile) Colo-Colo
6	MF	**Luis Musrri**	24 December 1969 (aged 17)		Universidad de Chile
7	FW	**Raimundo Tupper**	7 January 1969 (aged 18)		(Chile) Universidad Católica
8	MF	Sandro Navarrete	1 August 1968 (aged 19)		(Chile) Huachipato
9	FW	**Lukas Tudor**	21 February 1969 (aged 18)		(Chile) Universidad Católica
10	MF	**Fabián Estay**	5 October 1968 (aged 19)		(Chile) Universidad Católica
11	MF	**Pedro González**	17 October 1967 (aged 19)		(Chile) Deportes Valdivia
12	GK	Gerhard Reiher	21 April 1968 (aged 19)		(Chile) Provincial Osorno
13	DF	**Miguel Latín**	27 July 1968 (aged 19)		(Chile) Santiago Wanderers
14	FW	**Juan Carreño**	16 November 1968 (aged 18)		(Chile) Colo-Colo
15	DF	Reinaldo Hoffman	18 March 1970 (aged 17)		(Chile) Colo-Colo
16	MF	Héctor Cabello	14 January 1968 (aged 19)		(Chile) Deportes La Serena
17	MF	Camilo Pino	4 March 1968 (aged 19)		(Chile) Cobreloa
18	FW	Juan Reyes	31 August 1967 (aged 20)		(Chile) O'Higgins

=== Togo ===
Head coach: (Germany) Rainer Wilfeld

No.	Pos.	Player	Date of birth (age)	Caps	Club
1	GK	Mawuéna Apedo	1 July 1968 (aged 19)		(Togo) Gomido
2	DF	Koffi Amoussou-Kpakpa	12 December 1969 (aged 17)		(Togo) Entente II
3	DF	Koffi Hounze	30 March 1970 (aged 17)		(Togo) Olympique
4	MF	Messan Kpakpakpi-Kodjo	24 April 1973 (aged 14)		(Togo) Agaza
5	DF	Atty Affo	27 August 1970 (aged 17)		(Togo) Sèmassi
6	MF	Kossi Hope	13 August 1970 (aged 17)		(Togo) Agaza
7	FW	Kwami Agougnon	20 September 1969 (aged 18)		(Togo) Entente II
8	DF	Safiou Boukpessi	26 August 1968 (aged 19)		(France) Club Athletique Propriano
9	MF	Salissou Ali	9 December 1969 (aged 17)		(Togo) Aiglons
10	MF	Tete Koudouwovoh	30 October 1972 (aged 14)		(Togo) Agaza
11	MF	Komi Amouzou	21 September 1970 (aged 17)		(Togo) Agaza
12	GK	Gao Akondo	1 November 1969 (aged 17)		(Togo) ASKO
13	DF	Mensah Somu	27 November 1969 (aged 17)		(Togo) Gomido
14	MF	Massassaba Bassirou	24 July 1968 (aged 19)		(Togo) Agaza
15	FW	**Bachirou Salou**	6 August 1970 (aged 17)		(Togo) Agaza
16	DF	Kodjovi Kegbalo	19 August 1970 (aged 17)		(Togo) Agaza
17	MF	Kounama Amouzougan	12 September 1969 (aged 18)		(Togo) Doumbé
18	FW	Ati Okouro-Kro	16 August 1968 (aged 19)		(Togo) Gomido

=== Yugoslavia ===
Head coach: Mirko Jozić

No.	Pos.	Player	Date of birth (age)	Caps	Club
1	GK	**Dragoje Leković**	21 November 1967 (aged 19)		(Socialist Federal Republic of Yugoslavia) Budućnost Titograd
2	MF	**Branko Brnović**	8 August 1967 (aged 20)		(Socialist Federal Republic of Yugoslavia) Budućnost Titograd
3	DF	**Robert Jarni**	26 October 1968 (aged 18)		(Socialist Federal Republic of Yugoslavia) Hajduk Split
4	DF	**Dubravko Pavličić**	28 November 1967 (aged 19)		(Socialist Federal Republic of Yugoslavia) Dinamo Zagreb
5	DF	Slavoljub Janković	17 February 1969 (aged 18)		(Socialist Federal Republic of Yugoslavia) Red Star Belgrade
6	MF	**Igor Štimac**	6 September 1967 (aged 20)		(Socialist Federal Republic of Yugoslavia) Dinamo Vinkovci
7	FW	Zoran Mijucić	23 December 1968 (aged 18)		(Socialist Federal Republic of Yugoslavia) Vojvodina
8	MF	**Zvonimir Boban**	8 October 1968 (aged 19)		(Socialist Federal Republic of Yugoslavia) Dinamo Zagreb
9	MF	**Robert Prosinečki**	12 January 1969 (aged 18)		(Socialist Federal Republic of Yugoslavia) Red Star Belgrade
10	MF	Milan Pavlović (c)	30 December 1967 (aged 19)		(Socialist Federal Republic of Yugoslavia) Željezničar
11	FW	**Predrag Mijatović**	19 January 1969 (aged 18)		(Socialist Federal Republic of Yugoslavia) Budućnost Titograd
12	GK	**Tomislav Piplica**	5 April 1969 (aged 18)		(Socialist Federal Republic of Yugoslavia) Iskra
13	FW	**Davor Šuker**	1 January 1968 (aged 19)		(Socialist Federal Republic of Yugoslavia) Osijek
14	DF	**Gordan Petrić**	30 July 1969 (aged 18)		(Socialist Federal Republic of Yugoslavia) OFK Beograd
15	DF	Pero Škorić	18 June 1969 (aged 18)		(Socialist Federal Republic of Yugoslavia) Vojvodina
16	DF	Dejan Antonić	22 January 1968 (aged 19)		(Socialist Federal Republic of Yugoslavia) Red Star Belgrade
17	MF	Slaviša Đurković	18 August 1968 (aged 19)		(Socialist Federal Republic of Yugoslavia) Sutjeska
18	MF	Ranko Zirojević	1 September 1967 (aged 20)		(Socialist Federal Republic of Yugoslavia) Sutjeska

== Group B ==
=== Brazil ===
Head coach: Gilson Nunes

No.	Pos.	Player	Date of birth (age)	Caps	Club
1	GK	**Ronaldo Giovanelli**	20 November 1967 (aged 19)		(Brazil) Corinthians
2	DF	**César Sampaio**	30 March 1968 (aged 19)		(Brazil) Santos
3	DF	Sandro	24 August 1967 (aged 20)		(Brazil) Grêmio
4	DF	**André Cruz**	20 September 1968 (aged 19)		(Brazil) Ponte Preta
5	MF	Anderson	26 October 1968 (aged 18)		(Brazil) América
6	DF	Wanderley	10 August 1967 (aged 20)		(Brazil) Vitória
7	FW	Alcindo	21 October 1967 (aged 19)		(Brazil) Flamengo
8	MF	Dacroce	24 March 1968 (aged 19)		(Brazil) Vitória
9	FW	Edilson	9 January 1968 (aged 19)		(Brazil) Botafogo
10	MF	**Bismarck**	17 September 1969 (aged 18)		(Brazil) Vasco da Gama
11	MF	William	17 October 1968 (aged 18)		(Brazil) Vasco da Gama
12	GK	Palmieri	15 August 1968 (aged 19)		(Brazil) Bangu
13	DF	Maurício	25 July 1969 (aged 18)		(Brazil) Bahia
14	MF	Célio	25 May 1968 (aged 19)		(Brazil) Americano
15	MF	Júnior	14 May 1968 (aged 19)		(Brazil) Joinville
16	MF	Paulinho Andreolli	23 February 1968 (aged 19)		(Brazil) Fluminense
17	FW	Galil	5 June 1968 (aged 19)		(Brazil) Flamengo
18	MF	Zé Maria	14 August 1968 (aged 19)		(Brazil) Fluminense

=== Canada ===
Head coach: (Scotland) Tony Taylor

No.	Pos.	Player	Date of birth (age)	Caps	Club
1	GK	**Pat Onstad**	13 January 1968 (aged 19)		(Canada) Vancouver 86ers
2	DF	**Peter Sarantopoulos**	2 May 1968 (aged 19)		(Canada) Wexford SC
3	DF	**Ian Carter**	20 September 1967 (aged 20)		(Canada) Toronto Italia
4	DF	Burke Kaiser	20 October 1967 (aged 19)		(Canada) Calgary Kickers
5	DF	**Steve Jansen**	4 November 1967 (aged 19)		(Canada) Winnipeg Fury
6	DF	Rick Celebrini	16 October 1967 (aged 19)		(Canada) Edmonton Brick Men
7	MF	Neil Wilkinson	10 August 1967 (aged 20)		(Canada) Edmonton Brick Men
8	MF	**Marco Rizi**	15 August 1968 (aged 19)		(Canada) Montreal Supra
9	FW	**James Grimes**	26 March 1968 (aged 19)		(Canada) North York Rockets
10	MF	**Nick De Santis**	11 September 1968 (aged 19)		(Canada) Montreal Supra
11	FW	**Doug McKinty**	1 July 1968 (aged 19)		(Canada) Vancouver 86ers
12	MF	**Tony Pignatiello**	29 April 1968 (aged 19)		(Canada) Toronto Italia
13	MF	**John Fitzgerald**	4 December 1968 (aged 18)		(Canada) Wexford SC
14	MF	Peter Serafini	12 March 1969 (aged 18)		(Canada) Toronto Italia
15	FW	**Domenic Mobilio**	14 January 1969 (aged 18)		(Canada) Vancouver 86ers
16	DF	Guido Boin	1 January 1968 (aged 19)		(Canada) Hamilton Steelers
17	FW	Billy Domezetis	18 December 1967 (aged 19)		(Canada) Hamilton Steelers
18	GK	**Craig Forrest**	20 September 1967 (aged 20)		(England) Ipswich Town

=== Italy ===
Head coach: Giuseppe Lupi

No.	Pos.	Player	Date of birth (age)	Caps	Club
1	GK	Daniele Limonta	24 November 1967 (aged 19)		(Italy) Milan
2	DF	Alberto Rivolta	4 November 1967 (aged 19)		(Italy) Internazionale
3	DF	Mario Manzo	20 October 1967 (aged 19)		(Italy) Brescia
4	DF	Michele Zanutta	20 October 1967 (aged 19)		(Italy) Sampdoria
5	DF	Andrea Rocchigiani	29 August 1967 (aged 20)		(Italy) Fiorentina
6	MF	Luca Giunchi	2 August 1967 (aged 20)		(Italy) Fano
7	FW	**Alessandro Melli**	11 December 1969 (aged 17)		(Italy) Parma
8	MF	Marco Sinigaglia	29 February 1968 (aged 19)		(Italy) Sambenedettese
9	MF	Stefano Impallomeni	24 October 1967 (aged 19)		(Italy) Parma
10	MF	Marco Carrara	1 November 1967 (aged 19)		(Italy) Arezzo
11	FW	Paolo Mandelli	4 December 1967 (aged 19)		(Italy) Sambenedettese
12	GK	Massimiliano Caniato	14 October 1967 (aged 19)		(Italy) Licata
13	DF	Luigi Garzja	7 July 1969 (aged 18)		(Italy) Lecce
14	DF	Andrea Cuicchi	29 November 1967 (aged 19)		(Italy) Catania
15	MF	Andrea Caverzan	14 September 1968 (aged 19)		(Italy) Juventus
16	MF	David Fiorentini	7 September 1967 (aged 20)		(Italy) Pisa
17	FW	Antonio Rizzolo	22 April 1969 (aged 18)		(Italy) Lazio
18	FW	Giuseppe Compagno	25 August 1968 (aged 19)		(Italy) Atalanta

=== Nigeria ===
Head coach: Christopher Udemezue

No.	Pos.	Player	Date of birth (age)	Caps	Club
1	GK	**Willy Okpara**	6 September 1968 (aged 19)		(Nigeria) ACB Lagos
2	MF	Sani Adamu	2 November 1968 (aged 18)		(Nigeria) JIB
3	FW	Peter Nieketien	26 November 1968 (aged 18)		(Nigeria) Julius Berger
4	MF	**John Ene Okon**	15 March 1969 (aged 18)		(Nigeria) BCC Lions
5	DF	**Nduka Ugbade**	6 September 1969 (aged 18)		(Nigeria) El-Kanemi Warriors
6	DF	**Oladipupo Babalola**	4 August 1968 (aged 19)		(Nigeria) Julius Berger
7	MF	Adeolu Adekola	19 May 1968 (aged 19)		(Nigeria) Julius Berger
8	MF	Ikpowosa Omoregie	4 November 1967 (aged 19)		(Nigeria) ACB Lagos
9	FW	**Jonathan Akpoborie**	20 October 1968 (aged 18)		(Nigeria) Julius Berger
10	MF	**Etim Esin**	5 October 1969 (aged 18)		(Nigeria) Iwuanyanwu Nationale
11	FW	Lawrence Ukaegbu	15 September 1969 (aged 18)		(Nigeria) Iwuanyanwu Nationale
12	GK	Lucky Agbonsevbafe	12 August 1969 (aged 18)		(Nigeria) El-Kanemi Warriors
13	MF	Victor Igbinoba	8 October 1969 (aged 18)		(Nigeria) Flash Flamingoes
14	DF	Esien Ndiyo	25 December 1968 (aged 18)		(Nigeria) Ranchers Bees
15	MF	**Thompson Oliha**	4 October 1968 (aged 19)		(Nigeria) Bendel Insurance
16	DF	Ibrahim Baba	8 December 1968 (aged 18)		(Nigeria) El-Kanemi Warriors
17	DF	Nosa Osadalor	27 August 1968 (aged 19)		(Nigeria) ACB Lagos
18	MF	Biodun Adegbenro	17 December 1971 (aged 15)		(Nigeria) Stationery Stores

== Group C ==
=== Bahrain ===
Head coach: Salman Ahmed Sharida

No.	Pos.	Player	Date of birth (age)	Caps	Club
1	GK	Ibrahim Habib	2 September 1969 (aged 18)		Bahrain
2	DF	Abdulrazzaq Abbas	3 October 1969 (aged 18)		(Bahrain) Al Ahli
3	DF	Samir Al Hamadi	5 April 1968 (aged 19)		(Bahrain) Al Ahli
4	MF	**Hamed Al Jazaf**	20 October 1969 (aged 17)		Bahrain
5	DF	Juma Marzooq	21 October 1968 (aged 18)		(Bahrain) Al Wahda
6	MF	Juma Marhab	27 October 1968 (aged 18)		(Bahrain) Al Wahda
7	MF	Sami Al Hayki	8 December 1969 (aged 17)		(Bahrain) Qadisiya
8	MF	Jasim Kamal	5 November 1970 (aged 16)		(Bahrain) Al Ahli
9	FW	Bader Sowar	25 September 1968 (aged 19)		(Bahrain) Al Wahda
10	FW	Walid Showaiter	16 February 1969 (aged 18)		Bahrain
11	FW	Abdullah Al Nusuf	10 November 1969 (aged 17)		(Bahrain) East Riffa
12	MF	Mohamed Al Kharraz	12 September 1971 (aged 16)		(Bahrain) Muharraq
13	FW	Khalid Ahmed	21 August 1969 (aged 18)		(Bahrain) Manama
14	DF	Hasan Khalfan	29 January 1969 (aged 18)		(Bahrain) Al-Wahda
15	DF	Khamis Thani	11 August 1968 (aged 19)		(Bahrain) East Riffa
16	FW	Abdulrahman Ali	1 March 1969 (aged 18)		(Bahrain) Muharraq
17	MF	Naser Jowher	11 December 1969 (aged 17)		(Bahrain) Al Wahda
18	GK	Abdulrahman Mohamed	23 March 1969 (aged 18)		(Bahrain) Al Hala

=== Colombia ===
Head coach: José Finot Castano

No.	Pos.	Player	Date of birth (age)	Caps	Club
1	GK	**Eduardo Niño**	8 August 1967 (aged 20)		(Colombia) Independiente Santa Fe
2	MF	Alfonso Diaz	9 September 1967 (aged 20)		(Colombia) Atlético Junior
3	DF	William Muñoz	6 July 1968 (aged 19)		(Colombia) Deportivo Cali
4	DF	Vladimir Campos	29 January 1968 (aged 19)		(Colombia) Deportivo Cali
5	DF	Martin Caicedo	2 October 1968 (aged 19)		(Colombia) Deportivo Cali
6	MF	Ronald Valderrama	4 December 1967 (aged 19)		(Colombia) Unión Magdalena
7	FW	**Miguel Ángel Guerrero**	7 September 1967 (aged 20)		(Colombia) Atlético Bucaramanga
8	MF	**Andres Estrada**	12 November 1967 (aged 19)		(Colombia) Deportivo Cali
9	MF	**Wilmer Cabrera**	15 September 1967 (aged 20)		(Colombia) Independiente Santa Fe
10	MF	**Wilson Pérez**	9 August 1967 (aged 20)		(Colombia) Atlético Junior
11	MF	Carlos Pimiento	15 October 1968 (aged 18)		(Colombia) Deportes Tolima
12	GK	**Óscar Córdoba**	3 February 1970 (aged 17)		(Colombia) Deportivo Cali
13	MF	**Óscar Pareja**	10 August 1968 (aged 19)		(Colombia) Independiente Medellín
14	DF	John Jimenez	8 August 1968 (aged 19)		(Colombia) América de Cali
15	MF	Diego Correa	14 September 1967 (aged 20)		(Colombia) Independiente Medellín
16	MF	Roberto Cañón	2 April 1967 (aged 20)		(Colombia) Independiente Santa Fe
17	FW	**John Jairo Tréllez**	29 April 1968 (aged 19)		(Colombia) Atlético Nacional
18	FW	Eugenio Samaniego	27 December 1968 (aged 18)		(Colombia) Deportivo Pereira

=== East Germany ===
Head coach: Eberhard Vogel

No.	Pos.	Player	Date of birth (age)	Caps	Club
1	GK	Holger Hiemann	12 January 1968 (aged 19)		(East Germany) FC Karl-Marx-Stadt
2	DF	Uwe Amstein	20 August 1967 (aged 20)		(East Germany) FC Carl Zeiss Jena
3	MF	Karsten Neitzel	17 December 1967 (aged 19)		(East Germany) Dynamo Dresden
4	DF	**Dirk Schuster**	29 December 1967 (aged 19)		(East Germany) BSG Sachsenring Zwickau
5	DF	**Torsten Kracht**	4 October 1967 (aged 20)		(East Germany) 1. FC Lokomotive Leipzig
6	MF	Marco Köller	25 June 1969 (aged 18)		(East Germany) BFC Dynamo
7	MF	**Rico Steinmann**	26 December 1967 (aged 19)		(East Germany) FC Karl-Marx-Stadt
8	MF	**Stefan Minkwitz**	1 June 1968 (aged 19)		(East Germany) 1. FC Magdeburg
9	FW	Jörg Prasse	28 April 1968 (aged 19)		(East Germany) Dynamo Dresden
10	MF	**Matthias Sammer**	5 September 1967 (aged 20)		(East Germany) Dynamo Dresden
11	MF	Uwe Jähnig	26 August 1969 (aged 18)		(East Germany) Dynamo Dresden
12	DF	**Thomas Ritter**	10 October 1967 (aged 20)		(East Germany) Dynamo Dresden
13	DF	**Hendrik Herzog**	2 April 1967 (aged 20)		(East Germany) BFC Dynamo
14	MF	Heiko Liebers	18 December 1967 (aged 19)		(East Germany) BSG Motor Grimma
15	MF	Timo Lange	19 January 1967 (aged 20)		(East Germany) Stahl Brandenburg
16	GK	Ingo Saager	26 November 1968 (aged 18)		(East Germany) 1. FC Lokomotive Leipzig
17	FW	Matthias Zimmerling	6 September 1967 (aged 20)		(East Germany) 1. FC Lokomotive Leipzig
18	MF	**Dariusz Wosz**	8 June 1969 (aged 18)		(East Germany) Hallescher Chemie

=== Scotland ===
Head coach: Ross Mathie

No.	Pos.	Player	Date of birth (age)	Caps	Club
1	GK	Kevin McKeown	12 October 1967 (aged 19)		(Scotland) Motherwell
2	DF	Robert McRobb	13 September 1968 (aged 19)		(Scotland) Aberdeen
3	DF	Brian Welsh	23 February 1969 (aged 18)		(Scotland) Dundee United
4	DF	Jim Weir	15 June 1969 (aged 18)		(Scotland) Hamilton Academical
5	DF	Scott Nisbet	30 January 1968 (aged 19)		(Scotland) Rangers
6	FW	Alex Mathie	20 December 1968 (aged 18)		(Scotland) Celtic
7	MF	Steven Murray	1 December 1967 (aged 19)		(Scotland) Celtic
8	MF	**Billy McKinlay**	22 April 1969 (aged 18)		(Scotland) Dundee United
9	MF	Paul Wright	17 August 1968 (aged 19)		(Scotland) Aberdeen
10	FW	Paul Hunter	30 August 1967 (aged 20)		(Scotland) East Fife
11	FW	Joe McLeod	30 December 1967 (aged 19)		(Scotland) Dundee United
12	GK	Alan Main	5 December 1967 (aged 19)		(Scotland) Dundee United
13	DF	Alan Redpath	19 August 1967 (aged 20)		(Scotland) Heart of Midlothian
14	MF	Gary Ogilvie	16 November 1967 (aged 19)		(Scotland) Dundee
15	DF	Stevie Campbell	20 November 1967 (aged 19)		(Scotland) Dundee
16	MF	John Butler	21 January 1969 (aged 18)		(Scotland) St Mirren
17	FW	Derek Cook	26 April 1968 (aged 19)		(Scotland) Kilmarnock
18	MF	Scott Crabbe	12 August 1968 (aged 19)		(Scotland) Heart of Midlothian

== Group D ==
=== Bulgaria ===
Head coach: Hristo Andonov

No.	Pos.	Player	Date of birth (age)	Caps	Club
1	GK	Plamen Kolev	4 January 1968 (aged 19)		(Bulgaria) Osam
2	DF	Anton Velkov	15 July 1968 (aged 19)		(Bulgaria) Lokomtoiv Sofia
3	DF	**Valentin Dartilov**	14 August 1967 (aged 20)		(Bulgaria) Pirin Blagoevgrad
4	DF	**Ilian Kiriakov**	4 August 1967 (aged 20)		(Bulgaria) Etar Veliko Tarnovo
5	DF	**Marius Urukov**	24 August 1967 (aged 20)		(Bulgaria) Spartak Pleven
6	MF	**Ivo Slavchev**	21 January 1968 (aged 19)		(Bulgaria) Minyor Pernik
7	FW	**Emil Kostadinov**	12 August 1967 (aged 20)		(Bulgaria) Sredetz Sofia
8	MF	Aleksandar Dimov	25 September 1967 (aged 20)		(Bulgaria) Madara
9	MF	Radko Kalaydzhiev	28 September 1967 (aged 20)		(Bulgaria) Beroe Stara Zagora
10	MF	Plamen Petkov	17 October 1967 (aged 19)		(Bulgaria) Lokomotiv Rousse
11	FW	Mincho Minchev	31 October 1967 (aged 19)		(Bulgaria) Dimitrovgrad
12	GK	Stoycho Dragov	30 August 1968 (aged 19)		(Bulgaria) Beroe Stara Zagora
13	DF	Kiril Andonov	1 November 1968 (aged 18)		(Bulgaria) Spartak Plovdiv
14	MF	**Kiril Hristov**	31 January 1969 (aged 18)		(Bulgaria) Spartak Varna
15	FW	Valeri Valkov	18 August 1967 (aged 20)		(Bulgaria) Sliven
16	FW	**Dimitar Trendafilov**	25 February 1967 (aged 20)		(Bulgaria) Spartak Varna
17	FW	Rumen Stoyanov	19 September 1968 (aged 19)		(Bulgaria) Sredetz Sofia
18	DF	Kiril Kirilov	4 November 1968 (aged 18)		(Bulgaria) Dunav Rousse

=== Saudi Arabia ===
Head coach: (Brazil) Oswaldo Sempaio

No.	Pos.	Player	Date of birth (age)	Caps	Club
1	GK	Nawaf Mubarak	12 December 1969 (aged 17)		(Saudi Arabia) Al-Nasr
2	DF	Abdulrahman Al-Tekhaif	10 January 1970 (aged 17)		(Saudi Arabia) Al-Hilal
3	MF	Zaki Al-Saleh	22 November 1970 (aged 16)		(Saudi Arabia) Al-Ittifaq
4	DF	**Abdulrahman Al-Roomi**	28 October 1968 (aged 18)		(Saudi Arabia) Al-Shabab
5	DF	**Ahmad Jamil Madani**	6 January 1970 (aged 17)		(Saudi Arabia) Al-Ittihad
6	DF	Bassim Abu-Dawad	7 November 1967 (aged 19)		(Saudi Arabia) Al-Ahli
7	MF	Rashed Al-Dukkan	14 December 1969 (aged 17)		(Saudi Arabia) Al-Nasr
8	MF	Abdulaziz Al-Razgan	6 December 1969 (aged 17)		(Saudi Arabia) Al-Shabab
9	FW	Sadoun Al-Suraiti	14 July 1970 (aged 17)		(Saudi Arabia) Al-Ittifaq
10	FW	Yousef Al-Dosary	13 October 1968 (aged 18)		(Saudi Arabia) Al-Hilal
11	FW	Saud Al-Hammad	19 March 1968 (aged 19)		(Saudi Arabia) Al-Hilal
12	MF	Khaled Al-Harbi	11 October 1969 (aged 17)		(Saudi Arabia) Al-Ahli
13	MF	**Khalid Al-Muwallid**	23 November 1971 (aged 15)		(Saudi Arabia) Al-Ahli
14	GK	Adel Al-Dosary	4 October 1970 (aged 17)		(Saudi Arabia) Al-Ittifaq
15	FW	Nasser Al-Fahad	3 July 1969 (aged 18)		(Saudi Arabia) Al-Nasr
16	DF	Mansour Dagriri	4 November 1969 (aged 17)		(Saudi Arabia) Al-Ahli
17	MF	Mohammed Shalgan	28 October 1970 (aged 16)		(Saudi Arabia) Al-Nasr
18	GK	Musa Bedewi	20 October 1970 (aged 16)		(Saudi Arabia) Al-Wadha

=== West Germany ===
Head coach: Berti Vogts

No.	Pos.	Player	Date of birth (age)	Caps	Club
1	GK	Uwe Brunn	20 November 1967 (aged 19)		(West Germany) 1. FC Köln
2	DF	Hans-Jürgen Heidenreich	17 August 1967 (aged 20)		(West Germany) 1. FC Nürnberg
3	DF	Jürgen Luginger	8 December 1967 (aged 19)		(West Germany) Fortuna Düsseldorf
4	DF	Gunther Metz	8 August 1967 (aged 20)		(West Germany) Karlsruher SC
5	DF	Alexander Strehmel	20 March 1968 (aged 19)		(West Germany) VfB Stuttgart
6	MF	Martin Schneider	24 November 1968 (aged 18)		(West Germany) 1. FC Nürnberg
7	MF	Adrian Spyrka	1 August 1967 (aged 20)		(West Germany) Borussia Dortmund
8	MF	Detlev Dammeier	18 October 1967 (aged 19)		(West Germany) Hannover 96
9	FW	Thomas Epp	7 April 1968 (aged 19)		(West Germany) VfL Bochum
10	MF	**Andreas Möller**	2 September 1967 (aged 20)		(West Germany) Eintracht Frankfurt
11	FW	Henrik Eichenauer	7 July 1968 (aged 19)		(West Germany) Waldhof Mannheim
12	GK	Andreas Clauß	13 January 1969 (aged 18)		(West Germany) Waldhof Mannheim
13	MF	Marcel Witeczek	18 October 1968 (aged 18)		(West Germany) Bayer Uerdingen
14	DF	Michael Klinkert	7 July 1968 (aged 19)		(West Germany) FC Schalke 04
15	MF	**Knut Reinhardt**	27 April 1968 (aged 19)		(West Germany) Bayer Leverkusen
16	MF	Frank Würzburger	3 December 1968 (aged 18)		(West Germany) Kickers Offenbach
17	DF	Andreas Claasen	3 November 1967 (aged 19)		(West Germany) Bayern Munich
18	FW	**Michael Preetz**	17 August 1967 (aged 20)		(West Germany) Fortuna Düsseldorf

=== United States ===
Head coach: (England) Derek Armstrong

No.	Pos.	Player	Date of birth (age)	Caps	Club
1	GK	**Tony Meola**	21 February 1969 (aged 18)		(United States) Oceanside SC
2	DF	Tommy Reasoner	27 October 1967 (aged 19)		(United States) University of Tampa
3	MF	David Pfeil	4 December 1967 (aged 19)	0	(United States) SMU Mustangs
4	DF	**Jeff Agoos**	2 May 1968 (aged 19)		(United States) Virginia Cavaliers
5	DF	Chris Szanto	17 August 1967 (aged 20)		(United States) NC State Wolfpack
6	DF	**Mark Santel**	5 July 1968 (aged 19)		(United States) Gallagher SC
7	MF	**Brian Benedict**	27 December 1968 (aged 18)		(United States) USA Soccer Club
8	MF	**Hendrig Gutierrez**	28 August 1968 (aged 19)		(United States) Miami Lakes
9	FW	Chris Unger	14 March 1968 (aged 19)		(United States) Union Lancers
10	MF	**Marcelo Balboa**	8 August 1967 (aged 20)		(United States) Fram-Culver
11	FW	Eddie Henderson	11 September 1967 (aged 20)		(United States) Sport Haus SC
12	MF	John Gwin	31 October 1968 (aged 18)		(United States) Boise Nationals
13	FW	**Mike Constantino**	5 February 1969 (aged 18)		(United States) Brooklyn Italians
14	MF	Adrian Gaitan	10 November 1967 (aged 19)		(United States) Oceanside SC
15	DF	Danny Pena	17 June 1968 (aged 19)		(United States) Fram-Culver
16	MF	Ray Fernandez	5 March 1968 (aged 19)		(United States) Torrance SC
17	FW	**Lucas Martin**	22 February 1968 (aged 19)		(United States) San Diego Nomads
18	GK	**Kasey Keller**	29 November 1969 (aged 17)		(United States) Federal Way Force
