= 1995 DFB-Pokal final =

- Match programme cover
- Event: 1994–95 DFB-Pokal
Borussia Mönchengladbach	VfL Wolfsburg
3	0
- Date: 24 June 1995
- Venue: Olympiastadion, Berlin
- Referee: Eugen Strigel (Horb)
- Attendance: 75,717

The 1995 DFB-Pokal final decided the winner of the 1994–95 DFB-Pokal, the 52nd season of Germany's premier knockout football cup competition. It was played on 24 June 1995 at the Olympiastadion in Berlin. Borussia Mönchengladbach won the match 3–0 against VfL Wolfsburg to claim their third cup title, qualifying for the 1995–96 UEFA Cup Winners' Cup and the 1995 DFB-Supercup.

== Route to the final ==
The DFB-Pokal was a 64 teams in a single-elimination knockout cup competition. There were a total of five rounds leading up to the final. Teams were drawn against each other, and the winner after 90 minutes would advance. If still tied, 30 minutes of extra time was played. If the score was still level, a penalty shoot-out was used to determine the winner.

Note: In all results below, the score of the finalist is given first (H: home; A: away).

Borussia Mönchengladbach		Round	VfL Wolfsburg
Opponent	Result	1994–95 DFB-Pokal	Opponent	Result
Greifswalder FC (A)	4–1	Round 1	Schalke 04 Amateure (A)	2–0
Kickers Offenbach (A)	1–0	Round 2	Eintracht Frankfurt (A)	0–0 (a.e.t.) (4–3 p)
Mainz 05 (H)	6–4	Round of 16	TSV Vestenbergsgreuth (A)	1–1 (a.e.t.) (4–3 p)
Schalke 04 (H)	3–2	Quarter-finals	Bayern Munich Amateure (A)	2–1
1. FC Kaiserslautern (H)	1–0 (a.e.t.)	Semi-finals	1. FC Köln (A)	1–0

== Match ==
=== Details ===
24 June 1995
18:00 CEST

Borussia Mönchengladbach	3–0	VfL Wolfsburg
Dahlin 13'; Effenberg 61'; Herrlich 86'	Report

Olympiastadion, Berlin
Attendance: 75,717
Referee: Eugen Strigel (Horb)

Borussia Mönchengladbach	VfL Wolfsburg

GK	1	(Germany) Uwe Kamps
RB	2	(Germany) Thomas Kastenmaier
CB	4	(Sweden) Patrik Andersson
CB	3	(Germany) Michael Klinkert	Booked
LB	6	(Germany) Jörg Neun
DM	5	(Germany) Christian Hochstätter		(substituted off) 65'
RM	8	(Germany) Peter Wynhoff		(substituted off) 88'
CM	10	(Germany) Stefan Effenberg (c)	Booked
LM	7	(Germany) Karlheinz Pflipsen
CF	9	(Sweden) Martin Dahlin	Booked
CF	11	(Germany) Heiko Herrlich
Substitutes:
GK		(Germany) Jörg Kässmann
DF	14	(Germany) Joachim Stadler		(substituted in) 88'
MF	12	(Germany) Holger Fach		(substituted in) 65'
MF		(Denmark) Peter Nielsen
FW		(Togo) Bachirou Salou
Manager:
(Austria) Bernd Krauss

GK	1	(Germany) Uwe Zimmermann
SW	3	(Germany) Frank Lieberam
CB	5	(Denmark) Jann Jensen		(substituted off) 17'
CB	4	(Germany) Ulf-Volker Probst
RWB	7	(Germany) Uwe Klein
LWB	8	(Germany) Detlev Dammeier		(substituted off) 75'
CM	2	(Germany) Hans-Jürgen Brunner
CM	6	(Germany) Thomas Seeliger	Booked
AM	10	(Germany) Claus-Dieter Wollitz (c)
CF	9	(Germany) Siegfried Reich	Booked
CF	11	(Germany) Stefan Meissner
Substitutes:
GK		(Germany) Jörg Hoßbach
DF		(Germany) Karl-Heinz Emig
MF	13	(Germany) Michael Butrej		(substituted in) 75'
MF	15	(Germany) Stephan Täuber	Booked	(substituted in) 17'
FW		(Germany) Frank Plagge
Manager:
(Germany) Gerd Roggensack

Match rules

- 90 minutes.
- 30 minutes of extra time if necessary.
- Penalty shoot-out if scores still level.
- Maximum of two substitutions.
