= 1993–94 VfB Leipzig season =

VfB Leipzig
1993–94 season
- Manager: Bernd Stange (to 21 February); Jürgen Sundermann (22 February - 9 April); Damian Halata (from 10 April)
- Bundesliga: 18th (relegated)
- DFB-Pokal: First round
- Top goalscorer: Dirk Anders (8)

The 1993–94 season was VfB Leipzig's only season in the Bundesliga to date. It was a difficult season for the club, which saw them finish bottom of the table with just three wins (all 1–0).

== Squad ==
Note: Flags indicate national team as defined under FIFA eligibility rules; some limited exceptions apply. Players may hold more than one non-FIFA nationality.

No.	Pos.	Nation	Player
—	GK	GER	Maik Kischko
—	GK	GER	Ingo Saager
—	DF	GER	Holger Bühner (to January)
—	DF	USA	John Doyle
—	DF	GER	Frank Edmond
—	DF	GER	Helmut Gabriel
—	DF	GER	Marco Gräfe
—	DF	GER	Rico Kauerhof
—	DF	GER	Torsten Kracht (from January)
—	DF	GER	Matthias Lindner
—	MF	GER	Dirk Anders
—	MF	GER	Uwe Bredow
—	MF	GER	Nico Däbritz

No.	Pos.	Nation	Player
—	MF	GER	Jörg Engelmann
—	MF	GER	Dieter Hecking
—	MF	GER	Steffen Heidrich
—	MF	GER	Matthias Liebers
—	MF	GHA	Alexander Opoku
—	MF	GER	René Schmidt
—	MF	GER	Uwe Trommer
—	FW	BRA	Franklin
—	FW	MKD	Darko Pancev (from January)
—	FW	GER	Jürgen Rische
—	FW	GER	Frank Turnier
—	FW	GER	Florian Weichert

== Results ==
=== Bundesliga ===
7 August 1993	VfB Leipzig	3–3	Dynamo Dresden	Leipzig
15:30	Lindner 10'; Anders 17', 25'	Report	Marschall 15', 27', 69'	Stadium: Zentralstadion; Attendance: 31,400; Referee: Manfred Amerell (Munich)

17 August 1993	Werder Bremen	3–1	VfB Leipzig	Bremen
20:00	Hobsch 16'; Beiersdorfer 54'; Basler 86'	Report	Rische 15'	Stadium: Weserstadion; Attendance: 20,855; Referee: Jürgen Jansen (Essen)

27 August 1993	VfB Leipzig	1–1	MSV Duisburg	Leipzig
20:00	Edmond 47'	Report	Tarnat 26'	Stadium: Zentralstadion; Attendance: 9,300; Referee: Manfred Schmidt

1 September 1993	Bayern Munich	3–0	VfB Leipzig	Munich
20:00	Nerlinger 13'; Matthäus 55'; Schupp 88'	Report		Stadium: Olympiastadion; Attendance: 22,000; Referee: Jürgen Aust (Cologne)

4 September 1993	VfB Leipzig	0–0	SG Wattenscheid 09	Leipzig
15:30		Report		Stadium: Zentralstadion; Attendance: 5,300; Referee: Hermann Albrecht (Kaufbeuren)

7 September 1993	Borussia Dortmund	0–1	VfB Leipzig	Dortmund
20:00		Report	Rische 9'	Stadium: Westfalenstadion; Attendance: 40,590; Referee: Hans-Peter Best (Kämpfelbach)

11 September 1993	VfB Stuttgart	0–0	VfB Leipzig	Stuttgart
20:00		Report		Stadium: Gottlieb-Daimler-Stadion; Attendance: 15,000; Referee: Hartmut Strampe (Handorf)

17 September 1993	VfB Leipzig	1–4	Hamburger SV	Leipzig
20:00	Liebers 84'	Report	Bäron 25', 75'; Von Heesen 37'; Spies 88'	Stadium: Zentralstadion; Attendance: 17,800; Referee: Hellmut Krug (Gelsenkirchen)

25 September 1993	1. FC Köln	3–1	VfB Leipzig	Cologne
15:30	Lehmann 56'; Greiner 69'; Jancker 87'	Report	Edmond 58'	Stadium: Müngersdorfer Stadion; Attendance: 14,000; Referee: Eugen Strigel (Horb)

2 October 1993	VfB Leipzig	1–1	Borussia Mönchengladbach	Leipzig
15:30	Anders 81' (pen.)	Report	Salou 66'	Stadium: Zentralstadion; Attendance: 10,200; Referee: Markus Merk (Otterbach)

9 October 1993	Eintracht Frankfurt	2–1	VfB Leipzig	Frankfurt
15:30	Furtok 27', 87'	Report	Edmond 86'	Stadium: Waldstadion; Attendance: 22,500; Referee: Georg Dardenne (Nettersheim)

17 October 1993	VfB Leipzig	0–0	1. FC Kaiserslautern	Leipzig
18:00		Report		Stadium: Zentralstadion; Attendance: 11,200; Referee: Bernhard Zerr (Ottersweier)

22 October 1993	1. FC Nürnberg	5–0	VfB Leipzig	Nuremberg
20:00	Golke 9'; Zárate 36'; Wück 40'; Sutter 65'; Kubik 74'	Report		Stadium: Frankenstadion; Attendance: 30,000; Referee: Michael Malbranc (Hamburg)

30 October 1993	VfB Leipzig	1–0	Karlsruher SC	Leipzig
15:30	Heidrich 69'	Report		Stadium: Zentralstadion; Attendance: 7,800; Referee: Markus Weber (Bergkamen)

5 November 1993	FC Schalke 04	3–1	VfB Leipzig	Gelsenkirchen
20:00	Eckstein 28', 57'; Anderbrügge 90' (pen.)	Report	Rische 87'	Stadium: Parkstadion; Attendance: 25,000; Referee: Hans-Peter Dellwing (Trier)

14 November 1993	VfB Leipzig	2–2	SC Freiburg	Leipzig
18:00	Weichert 60', 75'	Report	Cardoso 29'; Zeyer 41'	Stadium: Zentralstadion; Attendance: 5,500; Referee: Bernhard Zerr (Ottersweier)

20 November 1993	Bayer Leverkusen	3–1	VfB Leipzig	Leverkusen
15:30	Schuster 57'; Kirsten 67', 76'	Report	Heidrich 14'	Stadium: Ulrich Haberland Stadion; Attendance: 8,300; Referee: Bernd Hauer (Celle)

26 November 1993	Dynamo Dresden	1–0	VfB Leipzig	Dresden
15:30	Penksa 16'	Report		Stadium: Rudolf-Harbig-Stadion; Attendance: 12,120; Referee: Edgar Steinborn (Sinzig)

4 December 1993	VfB Leipzig	0–0	VfB Stuttgart	Leipzig
15:30		Report		Stadium: Zentralstadion; Attendance: 5,800; Referee: Jürgen Jansen (Essen)

11 December 1993	VfB Leipzig	1–1	Werder Bremen	Leipzig
15:30	Bredow 36'	Report	Hobsch 51'	Stadium: Zentralstadion; Attendance: 10,800; Referee: Manfred Führer (Steinhagen)

12 February 1994	MSV Duisburg	2–1	VfB Leipzig	Duisburg
15:30	Weidemann 29'; Wohlert 69'	Report	Pancev 50'	Stadium: Wedaustadion; Attendance: 16,100; Referee: Hans Scheuerer (Munich)

19 February 1994	VfB Leipzig	1–3	Bayern Munich	Leipzig
15:30	Anders 64'	Report	Scholl 3'; Nerlinger 4'; Ziege 33'	Stadium: Zentralstadion; Attendance: 37,000; Referee: Hellmut Krug (Gelsenkirchen)

27 February 1994	SG Wattenscheid 09	2–2	VfB Leipzig	Wattenscheid
15:30	Sané 29', 84'	Report	Weichert 5'; Anders 88' (pen.)	Stadium: Lohrheidestadion; Attendance: 8,000; Referee: Hartmut Strampe (Handorf)

5 March 1994	VfB Leipzig	2–3	Borussia Dortmund	Leipzig
15:30	Heidrich 30'; Anders 81'	Report	Chapuisat 48'; Sippel 71', 73'	Stadium: Zentralstadion; Attendance: 18,000; Referee: Aron Schmidhuber (Ottobrunn)

12 March 1994	Hamburger SV	3–0	VfB Leipzig	Hamburg
15:30	Ivanauskas 44'; Bäron 45'; Spörl 67'	Report		Stadium: Volksparkstadion; Attendance: 23,463; Referee: Rainer Werthmann (Bochum)

18 March 1994	VfB Leipzig	2–3	1. FC Köln	Leipzig
15:30	Anders 84'; Rische 90'	Report	Polster 49' (pen.), 89'; Baumann 51'	Stadium: Zentralstadion; Attendance: 5,500; Referee: Hans-Joachim Osmers (Bremen)

26 March 1994	Borussia Mönchengladbach	6–1	VfB Leipzig	Mönchengladbach
15:30	Dahlin 22', 43', 54'; Klinkert 39'; Kastenmaier 76' (pen.); Wynhoff 87'	Report	Rische 55'	Stadium: Bökelbergstadion; Attendance: 19,000; Referee: Alfons Berg (Konz)

2 April 1994	VfB Leipzig	1–0	Eintracht Frankfurt	Leipzig
15:30	Rische 29'	Report		Stadium: Zentralstadion; Attendance: 8,500; Referee: Hans-Peter Dellwing (Trier)

5 April 1994	1. FC Kaiserslautern	1–0	VfB Leipzig	Kaiserslautern
15:30	Sforza 88'	Report		Stadium: Fritz-Walter-Stadion; Attendance: 30,511; Referee: Eugen Strigel (Horb)

8 April 1994	VfB Leipzig	0–2	1. FC Nürnberg	Leipzig
20:00		Report	Kubik 4'; Criens 73'	Stadium: Zentralstadion; Attendance: 6,100; Referee: Karl-Josef Assenmacher (Fischenich)

16 April 1994	Karlsruher SC	3–2	VfB Leipzig	Karlsruhe
15:30	Shmarov 19'; Schmitt 34'; Schütterle 87'	Report	Heidrich 74'; Pancev 90'	Stadium: Wildparkstadion; Attendance: 16,000; Referee: Manfred Führer (Steinhagen)

23 April 1994	VfB Leipzig	2–2	FC Schalke 04	Leipzig
15:30	Franklin 71'; Anders 82' (pen.)	Report	Müller 31'; Lugninger 45'	Stadium: Zentralstadion; Attendance: 6,100; Referee: Hans Scheuerer (Munich)

30 April 1994	SC Freiburg	1–0	VfB Leipzig	Freiburg
15:30	Cardoso 83'	Report		Stadium: Dreisamstadion; Attendance: 15,000; Referee: Markus Weber (Bergkamen)

7 May 1994	VfB Leipzig	2–3	Bayer Leverkusen	Leipzig
15:30	Okpoku 20'; Edmond 79'	Report	Hecking 16' (o.g.); Paulo Sérgio 34'; Kirsten 89'	Stadium: Zentralstadion; Attendance: 5,100; Referee: Manfred Amerell (Munich)

=== DFB-Pokal ===
24 August 1993 Round 1	Bayer Uerdingen	1–0	VfB Leipzig	Krefeld
15:30	Feldhoff 8'	Report		Stadium: Grotenburg-Stadion; Attendance: 2,400; Referee: Edgar Steinborn (Sinzig)

== Transfers ==
=== In ===
Player	From	Date
(Germany) Holger Bühner	Rot-Weiß Erfurt	Summer
(United States) John Doyle	Örgryte	Summer
(Germany) Marco Gräfe	Unknown	Summer
(Ghana) Alexander Opoku	Youth team	Summer
(Germany) René Schmidt	Youth team	Summer
(Germany) Florian Weichert	Hamburger SV	Summer
(Germany) Torsten Kracht	VfB Stuttgart	Winter
(North Macedonia) Darko Pancev	Internazionale (loan)	Winter

=== Out ===
Player	To	Date
(Russia) Gennady Grishin	Torpedo Moscow	Summer
(Ghana) Sarfo Gyamfi	Hallescher FC	Summer
(Germany) Hans-Jürgen Heidenreich	Retired	Summer
(Germany) Torsten Kracht	VfB Stuttgart	Summer
(Poland) Janusz Turowski	Retired	Summer
(Germany) Holger Bühner	Hansa Rostock	Winter
