= 1994–95 DFB-Pokal =

Tournament details
- Country: Germany
- Teams: 64

Final positions
- Champions: Borussia Mönchengladbach
- Runners-up: VfL Wolfsburg

Tournament statistics
- Matches played: 63
- Top goal scorer: Heiko Herrlich (6)

The 1994–95 DFB-Pokal was the 52nd season of the annual German football cup competition. 64 teams competed in the tournament of six rounds which began on 13 August 1994 and ended on 24 June 1995. In the final Borussia Mönchengladbach defeated VfL Wolfsburg 3–0 thereby claiming their third title.

== Matches ==
Times up to 24 September 1994 and from 26 March 1995 are CEST (UTC+2). Times from 25 September 1994 to 25 March 1995 are CET (UTC+1).

=== First round ===
13 August 1994	FSV Salmrohr	2–1	VfB Leipzig	Salmtal
19:00	Marmon 37'; Thömmes 75'	Report (in German)	Kracht 66'	Attendance: 1,800; Referee: Müller (Blisdorf)

13 August 1994	SSV Ulm 1846	1–0 (a.e.t.)	1. FC Nürnberg	Ulm
19:00	Wölki 119'	Report (in German)		Stadium: Donaustadion; Attendance: 5,500; Referee: Volkmar Fischer (St. Wendel)

13 August 1994	Sportfreunde Oesede	1–6	Karlsruher SC
19:00	Back 20'	Report (in German)	Notowny 16'; Fink 43'; Knup 57', 84'; Kiriakov 69'; Häßler 71'	Attendance: 13,500; Referee: Frank Geske (Haltern)

13 August 1994	Hallescher FC	1–4	Bayer Uerdingen	Halle
19:00	Hoffmann 69'	Report (in German)	Krieg 16', 39'; Reinmayr 44'; Strozniak 84' (o.g.)	Stadium: Kurt-Wabbel-Stadion; Attendance: 2,000; Referee: Thomas Rüdiger (Bad Salzdetfurth)

13 August 1994	Kickers Offenbach	3–1	Hertha BSC	Offenbach
19:00	Koch 43'; Aleksic 65'; Nwanegbo 82'	Report (in German)	Schmöller 83'	Stadium: Bieberer Berg Stadion; Attendance: 5,500; Referee: Hermann Albrecht (Kaufbeuren)

13 August 1994	BSV Brandenburg	0–11	Bayer Leverkusen	Brandenburg
19:00		Report (in German)	Paulo Sérgio 25', 33' (pen.), 47', 52', 87'; Thom 62', 73', 74'; Lehnhoff 79'; Schuster 82'; Wörns 85'	Attendance: 1,900; Referee: Michael Malbranc (Hamburg)

13 August 1994	Altonaer FC 93	0–2	Borussia Dortmund	Hamburg
19:00		Report (in German)	Riedle 20'; Júlio César 85'	Stadium: Stadion Hoheluft; Attendance: 9,600; Referee: Lutz Pohlmann (Felde)

13 August 1994	Union Berlin	2–3	FC St. Pauli	Berlin
19:00	Markov 60'; Bennert 86' (pen.)	Report (in German)	Scharping 20'; Hollerbach 43'; Szubert 83'	Stadium: Alte Försterei; Attendance: 4,200; Referee: Jörg Keßler (Höhenkirchen)

13 August 1994	SC Großrosseln	1–5	Hamburger SV	Großrosseln
19:00	Kneip 87'	Report (in German)	Andersen 4', 66'; Letchkov 19'; Kober 27'; Hartmann 54'	Attendance: 7,000; Referee: Jörg Friedrichs (Ilvesheim)

13 August 1994	Stuttgarter Kickers	3–1	SC Freiburg	Stuttgart
19:00	Hofacker 17', 86' (pen.); Volke 90'	Report (in German)	Todt 30'	Stadium: Kickers-Stadion; Attendance: 3,600; Referee: Hans-Peter Best (Kämpfelbach)

13 August 1994	Bayern Munich (A)	2–1	Werder Bremen	Munich
19:00	Radlspeck 31'; Borowka 62' (o.g.)	Report (in German)	Beschastnykh 90'	Stadium: Stadion an der Grünwalder Strasse; Attendance: 2,200; Referee: Eugen Strigel (Horb)

13 August 1994	FC Sachsen Leipzig	0–0 (a.e.t.) (3–4 p)	1860 Munich	Leipzig
19:00		Report (in German)		Attendance: 7,400; Referee: Bernd Heynemann (Magdeburg)
	Penalties
	Nierlich (penalty missed); Feetz (penalty missed); Hammermüller (penalty scored); Pfitzner (penalty scored); König (penalty scored); Klee (penalty missed)		Pacult (penalty scored); Stević (penalty scored); Dowe (penalty missed); Keller (penalty missed); Seeliger (penalty scored); Winkler (penalty scored)

13 August 1994	Rot-Weiss Erfurt	0–2 (a.e.t.)	MSV Duisburg	Erfurt
19:00		Report (in German)	Cirjak 113'; Közle 114'	Stadium: Steigerwaldstadion; Attendance: 3,300; Referee: Burkhard Hufgard (Mömbris)

13 August 1994	Greifswalder FC	1–4	Borussia Mönchengladbach	Greifswald
19:00	Wriedt 35'	Report (in German)	Klinkert 45'; Fach 47'; Herrlich 55'; Kastenmaier 85'	Attendance: 3,000; Referee: Frank Fleske (Eisenhüttenstadt)

13 August 1994	SG Egelsbach	0–2	1. FC Kaiserslautern	Egelsbach
19:00		Report (in German)	Anders 33'; Kuka 79'	Attendance: 7,000; Referee: Edgar Steinborn (Sinzig)

13 August 1994	1. SC Göttingen 05	0–6	Eintracht Frankfurt	Göttingen
19:00		Report (in German)	Dickhaut 4'; Yeboah 18'; Furtok 34', 35'; Tskhadadze 85'; Legat 88'	Stadium: Maschparkstadion; Attendance: 11,500; Referee: Wolfgang Friedrichs (Lennestadt)

13 August 1994	Alemannia Aachen	0–2	FC Homburg	Aachen
19:00		Report (in German)	Linke 31'; Schmidt 90'	Stadium: Tivoli; Attendance: 3,500; Referee: Bernd Domurat (Datteln)

13 August 1994	Wuppertaler SV	1–2	Fortuna Köln	Wuppertal
19:00	Klauß 32'	Report (in German)	Beck 20'; Svinggaard 89'	Stadium: Stadion am Zoo; Attendance: 4,000; Referee: Hans-Joachim Albers (Rheinbrohl)

13 August 1994	Schalke 04 (A)	0–2	VfL Wolfsburg	Gelsenkirchen
19:00		Report (in German)	Reich 37'; Wollitz 58'	Attendance: 1,100; Referee: Hans-Jürgen Aust (Cologne)

13 August 1994	Holstein Kiel	0–2	1. FC Saarbrücken	Kiel
19:00		Report (in German)	Lust 59'; Tomas 88'	Stadium: Holsteinstadion; Attendance: 2,300; Referee: Hartmut Strampe (Handorf)

13 August 1994	SV Edenkoben	1–2	Waldhof Mannheim	Edenkoben
19:00	Stulin 24'	Report (in German)	Järvinen 65'; Köpper 74'	Attendance: 3,000; Referee: Alfons Berg (Konz)

13 August 1994	SV Meppen	0–1	Dynamo Dresden	Meppen
19:00		Report (in German)	Rank 60'	Stadium: Emslandstadion; Attendance: 6,500; Referee: Hans-Dieter Casper (Dortmund)

13 August 1994	FC Remscheid	0–7	1. FC Köln	Remscheid
19:00		Report (in German)	Kohn 14', 65', 83'; Steinmann 32'; Higl 35'; Polster 71', 73'	Stadium: Röntgenstadion; Attendance: 8,000; Referee: Rainer Werthmann (Bochum)

13 August 1994	Tennis Borussia Berlin	2–1	Hansa Rostock	Berlin
19:00	Rusyayev 15'; Mencel 71'	Report (in German)	Breitkreutz 66'	Stadium: Mommsenstadion; Attendance: 1,300; Referee: Wieland Ziller (Laußnitz)

13 August 1994	TuS Paderborn-Neuhaus	2–2 (a.e.t.) (4–5 p)	Chemnitzer FC	Paderborn
19:00	Hecking 31'; Hajradinović 79'	Report (in German)	Shala 16'; Mehlhorn 66'	Attendance: 2,000; Referee: Frank Kiefer (Bauntatal)
	Penalties
	Hecking (penalty scored); Mrugalla (penalty scored); Groeleken (penalty scored); Schmidt (penalty scored); Kischka (penalty missed); Hajradinović (penalty missed)		Panadić (penalty scored); Renn (penalty scored); Shala (penalty scored); Mehlhorn (penalty scored); Bittermann (penalty missed); Wienhold (penalty scored)

13 August 1994	Werder Bremen (A)	0–1	Mainz 05	Bremen
19:00		Report (in German)	Brinkmann 87'	Stadium: Weserstadion, Platz 11; Attendance: 800; Referee: Wolf-Günter Wiesel (Ottbergen)

13 August 1994	Karlsruher SC (A)	1–3	SG Wattenscheid 09	Karlsruhe
19:00	Flindt-Bjerg 54'	Report (in German)	Preetz 5', 36'; Lesniak 83'	Stadium: Wildparkstadion, Platz 2 Attendance: 3,000; Referee: Schmidt (Bad Hersfeld)

14 August 1994	SV Linx	1–2	Schalke 04	Rheinau
19:00	Suffner 25'	Report (in German)	Nemec 66'; Büskens 86'	Attendance: 4,000; Referee: Hans-Joachim Albers (Rheinbrohl)

14 August 1994	Carl Zeiss Jena	0–2	VfB Stuttgart	Jena
19:00		Report (in German)	Berthold 35'; Kögl 77' (pen.)	Stadium: Ernst-Abbe-Sportfeld; Attendance: 4,000; Referee: Kemmerling (Hannover)

14 August 1994	Rot-Weiss Essen	0–2 (a.e.t.)	VfL Bochum	Essen
19:00		Report (in German)	Hubner 112'; Wegmann 115' (pen.)	Stadium: Georg-Melches-Stadion; Attendance: 17,000; Referee: Hans-Jürgen Kasper (Katlenburg)

14 August 1994	TSV Vestenbergsgreuth	1–0	Bayern Munich	Nuremberg
19:00	Stein 43'	Report (in German)		Attendance: 24,200; Referee: Markus Merk (Otterbach)

14 August 1994	Preußen Münster	0–5	Hannover 96	Münster
19:00		Report (in German)	Daschner 51'; Groth 61'; Gütschow 63'; Harttgen 66'; Kobylanski 83'	Stadium: Preußenstadion; Attendance: 3,800; Referee: Jürgen Jansen (Essen)

=== Second round ===
9 September 1994	SG Wattenscheid 09	1–3	1. FC Köln	Wattenscheid
19:30	Wolters 60'	Report (in German)	Andersen 45'; Greiner 63'; Rudy 89'	Stadium: Lohrheidestadion; Attendance: 7,200; Referee: Hartmut Strampe (Handorf)

10 September 1994	1860 Munich	1–1 (a.e.t.) (4–1 p)	Bayer Leverkusen	Munich
15:30	Winkler 70'	Report (in German)	Dooley 60'	Stadium: Olympiastadion; Attendance: 18,000; Referee: Wieland Ziller (Lausitz)
	Penalties
	Pacult (penalty scored); Winkler (penalty scored); Seeliger (penalty scored); Trares (penalty scored)		Lupescu (penalty scored); Wörns (penalty missed); Völler (penalty missed)

10 September 1994	Eintracht Frankfurt	0–0 (a.e.t.) (3–4 p)	VfL Wolfsburg	Frankfurt
15:30		Report (in German)		Stadium: Waldstadion; Attendance: 5,300; Referee: Rainer Werthmann (Bochum)
	Penalties
	Falkenmayer (penalty scored); Legat (penalty scored); Yeboah (penalty scored); Binz (penalty missed); Komljenovic (penalty missed)		Lieberam (penalty scored); Dammeier (penalty scored); Probst (penalty missed); Jensen (penalty scored); Frąckiewicz (penalty scored)

10 September 1994	SSV Ulm 1846	0–1	VfB Stuttgart	Ulm
15:30		Report (in German)	Dunga 23'	Stadium: Donaustadion; Attendance: 18,000; Referee: Edgar Steinborn (Sinzig)

10 September 1994	Schalke 04	3–2	Hamburger SV	Gelsenkirchen
15:30	Anderbrügge 23' (pen.), 31'; Mulder 59'	Report (in German)	Bäron 17', 76'	Attendance: 22,900; Referee: Bernhard Zerr (Ottersweier)

10 September 1994	Stuttgarter Kickers	4–0	FSV Salmrohr	Stuttgart
15:30	Malchow 7'; Akpoborie 65'; Kevrić 68'; Sailer 84'	Report (in German)		Stadium: Kickers-Stadion; Attendance: 1,900; Referee: Kemmerling (Hannover)

10 September 1994	TSV Vestenbergsgreuth	5–1	FC Homburg	Vestenbergsgreuth
15:30	Klaus 15', 29', 65'; Hüttner 59'; Ernst 68'	Report (in German)	Simon 24'	Attendance: 3,300; Referee: Müller (Dresden)

10 September 1994	Tennis Borussia Berlin	3–4	FC St. Pauli	Berlin
15:30	Adler 24'; Rusyayev 28'; Mencel 83'	Report (in German)	Savichev 12'; Pröpper 53', 58'; Szubert 88'	Stadium: Mommsenstadion; Attendance: 25,000; Referee: Bernd Hauer (Celle)

10 September 1994	Dynamo Dresden	1–0	Bayer Uerdingen	Dresden
15:30	Spies 44'	Report (in German)		Stadium: Rudolf-Harbig-Stadion; Attendance: 9,000; Referee: Günther Habermann (Weißensee)

10 September 1994	Fortuna Köln	2–1	VfL Bochum	Cologne
15:30	Fuchs 25'; Präger 112'	Report (in German)	Wegmann 43'	Stadium: Südstadion; Attendance: 8,000; Referee: Hans-Jürgen Weberg (Essen)

10 September 1994	Karlsruher SC	1–1 (a.e.t.) (3–1 p)	Waldhof Mannheim	Karlsruhe
15:30	Carl 77'	Report (in German)	Reichel 1'	Stadium: Wildparkstadion; Attendance: 15,000; Referee: Hans Scheurer (Munich)
	Penalties
	Bilić (penalty scored); Carl (penalty scored); Häßler (penalty scored)		Köpper (penalty scored); Nachtweih (penalty missed); Järvinen (penalty missed); Kirsten (penalty missed)

11 September 1994	Kickers Offenbach	0–1	Borussia Mönchengladbach	Offenbach
		Report (in German)	Dahlin 89'	Attendance: 20,000; Referee: Volkmar Fischer (St. Wendel)

11 September 1994	Bayern Munich (A)	2–2 (a.e.t.) (4–1 p)	Chemnitzer FC	Munich
	Grill 12'; Hamann 60'	Report (in German)	Veit 11'; Meißner 59'	Stadium: Stadion an der Grünwalder Strasse; Attendance: 1,500; Referee: Herbert Fandel (Kyllburg)
	Penalties
	Hager (penalty scored); Zimmermann (penalty scored); Kuffour (penalty scored); Grill (penalty scored)		Panadic (penalty missed); Laudeley (penalty scored); Wienhold (penalty missed)

11 September 1994	Hannover 96	0–2	1. FC Saarbrücken	Saarbrücken
15:00		Report (in German)	Götz 45'; Schmugge 84'	Stadium: Ludwigsparkstadion; Attendance: 1,900; Referee: Georg Dardenne (Nettersheim)

14 September 1994	MSV Duisburg	0–2	Mainz 05	Duisburg
19:30		Report (in German)	Ziemer 41', 82'	Stadium: Wedaustadion; Attendance: 6,000; Referee: Hellmut Krug (Gelsenkirchen)

20 September 1994	1. FC Kaiserslautern	6–3 (a.e.t.)	Borussia Dortmund	Kaiserslautern
20:20	Anders 48'; Brehme 89' (pen.); Kadlec 99'; Marschall 102'; Kuka 114'; Wagner 119'	Report (in German)	Chapuisat 38'; Povlsen 57'; Sammer 97'	Attendance: 33,000; Referee: Hermann Albrecht (Kaufbeuren)

=== Round of 16 ===
25 October 1994	Borussia Mönchengladbach	6–4	Mainz 05	Mönchengladbach
	Wynhoff 13', 42'; Herrlich 15', 39'; Nielsen 52'; Effenberg 90'	Report (in German)	Zampach 5'; Klopp 41'; Hock 61'; Müller 63'	Attendance: 33,000; Referee: Jürgen Aust (Cologne)

25 October 1994	1. FC Saarbrücken	1–4	FC St. Pauli	Saarbrücken
	Tomas 65'	Report (in German)	Pröpper 8', 71'; Savichev 33', 62'	Stadium: Ludwigspark; Attendance: 6,000; Referee: Bernhard Zerr (Ottersweier)

25 October 1994	1. FC Köln	2–1	Dynamo Dresden	Cologne
	Labbadia 5', 39'	Report (in German)	Maucksch 36'	Attendance: 15,000; Referee: Hans-Joachim Osmers (Bremen)

26 October 1994	1860 Munich	1–2 (a.e.t.)	Schalke 04	Munich
	Bodden 26'	Report (in German)	Mulder 74'; Dikhtjar 113'	Attendance: 14,500; Referee: Bernd Heynemann (Magdeburg)

1 November 1994	TSV Vestenbergsgreuth	1–1 (a.e.t.) (3–4 p)	VfL Wolfsburg	Vestenbergsgreuth
	Schmidt 115'	Report (in German)	Reich 110'	Attendance: 5,500; Referee: Hans-Jürgen Weber (Essen)
	Penalties
	Schmidt (penalty scored); Hüttner (penalty scored); Ebner (penalty missed); Ernst (penalty missed); Santl (penalty scored)		Lieberam (penalty scored); Meißner (penalty scored); Wollitz (penalty missed); Butrej (penalty scored); Reich (penalty scored)

1 November 1994	Stuttgarter Kickers	0–2	Karlsruher SC	Stuttgart
		Report (in German)	Fink 4'; Knup 34'	Stadium: Kickers-Stadion; Attendance: 7,300; Referee: Winfried Buchhart (Schrobenhausen)

8 November 1994	1. FC Kaiserslautern	7–3	Fortuna Köln	Mönchengladbach
	Ritter 11'; Brehme 24' (pen.); Kuntz 41'; Radschuweit 73' (o.g.); Haber 76', 90'; Wagner 88'	Report (in German)	Präger 10', 86'; Radschuweit 34'	Stadium: Betzenberg; Attendance: 23,300; Referee: Hans-Peter Best (Kämpfelbach)

8 November 1994	Bayern Munich (A)	2–2 (a.e.t.) (7–6 p)	VfB Stuttgart	Munich
	Gerster 3'; Gerstmeier 70'	Report (in German)	Strunz 11'; Bobic 14'	Stadium: Stadion an der Grünwalder Strasse; Attendance: 3,500; Referee: Norbert Haupt (Berlin)
	Penalties
	Zickler (penalty scored); Hager (penalty missed); Protzel (penalty scored); Grill (penalty missed); Zimmermann (penalty scored); Gerstmeier (penalty scored); Radlspeck (penalty scored); Grimm (penalty scored); Pflügler (penalty scored)		Strunz (penalty scored); Kruse (penalty scored); Kögl (penalty scored); Poschner (penalty missed); Kienle (penalty missed); Foda (penalty scored); Bobic (penalty scored); Bochtler (penalty scored); Dubajić (penalty missed)

=== Quarter-finals ===
7 March 1995	1. FC Kaiserslautern	4–2	FC St. Pauli	Kaiserslautern
	Lusch 36'; Marschall 50', 62'; Hengen 85'	Report (in German)	Savichev 49'; Trulsen 67'	Stadium: Betzenberg; Attendance: 24,800; Referee: Hans Scheurer (Munich)

7 March 1995	Bayern Munich (A)	1–2	VfL Wolfsburg	Munich
	Hager 60'	Report (in German)	McBride 70'; Seeliger 81'	Stadium: Stadion an der Grünwalder Strasse; Attendance: 4,000; Referee: Wagner (Hofheim)

8 March 1995	1. FC Köln	2–1	Karlsruher SC	Cologne
	Labbadia 2', 49'	Report (in German)	Kiriakov 46'	Attendance: 19,100; Referee: Lutz-Michael Frohlich (Berlin)

8 March 1995	Borussia Mönchengladbach	3–2	Schalke 04	Mönchengladbach
	Nielsen 15'; Wynhoff 30'; Herrlich 61'	Report (in German)	Klinkert 2' (o.g.); Herzog 55'	Attendance: 31,500; Referee: Wolf-Günter Wiesel (Ottbergen)

=== Semi-finals ===
11 April 1995	1. FC Köln	0–1	VfL Wolfsburg	Cologne
		Report (in German)	Reich 20'	Attendance: 36,000; Referee: Burkhard Zerr (Ottersweier)

12 April 1995	Borussia Mönchengladbach	1–0 (a.e.t.)	1. FC Kaiserslautern	Mönchengladbach
	Herrlich 101'	Report (in German)		Attendance: 34,500; Referee: Bernd Heynemann (Magdeburg)

=== Final ===
24 June 1995
18:00 CEST

Borussia Mönchengladbach	3–0	VfL Wolfsburg
Dahlin 13'; Effenberg 61'; Herrlich 86'	Report

Olympiastadion, Berlin
Attendance: 75,717
Referee: Eugen Strigel (Horb)
