= 1992–93 2. Bundesliga =

19th season of the second-tier football league in Germany

2. Bundesliga
- Season: 1992–93
- Champions: SC Freiburg
- Promoted: SC Freiburg; MSV Duisburg; VfB Leipzig
- Relegated: SpVgg Unterhaching; Eintracht Braunschweig; VfL Osnabrück; Fortuna Düsseldorf; VfB Oldenburg; SV Darmstadt 98; FC Remscheid
- Matches played: 552
- Top goalscorer: Siegfried Reich (27 goals)
- Average attendance: 5,613

The 1992–93 2. Bundesliga season was the nineteenth season of the 2. Bundesliga, the second tier of the German football league system. It was the only season the league consisted of twenty four clubs in a single division, caused by the ongoing integration of clubs from the former East Germany.

SC Freiburg, MSV Duisburg and VfB Leipzig were promoted to the Bundesliga while SpVgg Unterhaching, Eintracht Braunschweig, VfL Osnabrück, Fortuna Düsseldorf, VfB Oldenburg, SV Darmstadt 98 and FC Remscheid were relegated to the Oberliga.

== League table ==
For the 1992–93 season Wuppertaler SV, VfL Wolfsburg and SpVgg Unterhaching were newly promoted to the 2. Bundesliga from the Oberliga while Stuttgarter Kickers, F.C. Hansa Rostock, MSV Duisburg and Fortuna Düsseldorf had been relegated to the league from the Bundesliga.

Locations of the participating teams of the 1992-93 season

Pos	Team	Pld	W	D	L	GF	GA	GD	Pts	Promotion or relegation
1	SC Freiburg (C, P)	46	27	11	8	102	57	+45	65	Promotion to Bundesliga
2	MSV Duisburg (P)	46	23	14	9	65	40	+25	60	Promotion to Bundesliga
3	VfB Leipzig (P)	46	22	14	10	66	45	+21	58	Promotion to Bundesliga
4	Waldhof Mannheim	46	21	13	12	66	53	+13	55	
5	Hertha BSC	46	19	15	12	82	55	+27	53	
6	Fortuna Köln	46	19	12	15	56	44	+12	50	
7	Chemnitzer FC	46	19	12	15	64	56	+8	50	
8	Carl Zeiss Jena	46	19	12	15	66	59	+7	50	
9	Hannover 96	46	16	16	14	60	60	0	48	
10	SV Meppen	46	15	17	14	41	43	−2	47	
11	Hansa Rostock	46	17	12	17	54	52	+2	46	
12	Mainz 05	46	17	12	17	54	58	−4	46	
13	Wuppertaler SV	46	16	13	17	55	50	+5	45	
14	VfL Wolfsburg	46	16	13	17	65	69	−4	45	
15	Stuttgarter Kickers	46	15	13	18	60	69	−9	43	
16	FC Homburg	46	13	17	16	50	53	−3	43	
17	FC St. Pauli	46	12	19	15	47	52	−5	43	
18	SpVgg Unterhaching (R)	46	15	12	19	58	67	−9	42	Relegation to Oberliga
19	Eintracht Braunschweig (R)	46	15	11	20	65	73	−8	41	Relegation to Oberliga
20	VfL Osnabrück (R)	46	14	13	19	63	72	−9	41	Relegation to Oberliga
21	Fortuna Düsseldorf (R)	46	11	12	23	45	65	−20	34	Relegation to Oberliga
22	VfB Oldenburg (R)	46	12	10	24	57	90	−33	34	Relegation to Oberliga
23	FC Remscheid (R)	46	9	15	22	50	83	−33	33	Relegation to Oberliga
24	Darmstadt 98 (R)	46	9	14	23	43	79	−36	32	Relegation to Oberliga

Source: Bundesliga.de
Rules for classification: 1) points; 2) goal difference; 3) number of goals scored.
(C) Champions; (P) Promoted; (R) Relegated

== Results ==
Home \ Away	SCF	DUI	LEI	WMA	BSC	FKO	CFC	JEN	H96	SVM	ROS	M05	WSV	WOB	SKI	HOM	STP	UNT	EBS	OSN	F95	OLD	FCR	D98
SC Freiburg	—	3–1	1–0	1–2	4–2	3–1	2–0	3–1	4–0	1–1	2–1	0–0	3–1	1–3	2–0	2–2	2–1	4–2	3–1	2–0	5–1	6–1	1–1	1–1
MSV Duisburg	1–0	—	1–1	2–1	2–1	2–0	1–0	1–1	0–0	1–0	2–1	2–1	2–1	3–0	1–1	3–0	1–0	4–0	2–2	2–0	3–1	1–1	5–0	1–0
VfB Leipzig	2–0	0–0	—	3–0	2–0	0–1	3–4	3–0	3–0	1–0	1–2	2–0	3–0	3–2	3–2	2–0	0–0	2–1	2–1	0–0	0–0	1–1	2–1	2–0
Waldhof Mannheim	1–2	2–1	0–0	—	2–2	0–0	2–1	3–1	1–0	0–3	3–0	1–0	1–2	2–1	3–0	2–0	1–1	1–0	3–1	3–0	1–0	3–0	2–0	4–0
Hertha BSC	1–2	2–0	4–1	2–0	—	2–1	1–2	2–3	3–0	4–0	5–1	3–0	1–0	2–0	1–1	1–0	2–2	4–1	0–0	4–0	0–0	4–2	3–3	1–0
Fortuna Köln	2–2	0–0	0–1	0–1	2–0	—	1–1	1–2	5–0	1–1	0–0	0–2	1–0	5–1	3–0	1–0	2–2	2–0	2–1	1–0	0–2	2–1	3–1	4–0
Chemnitzer FC	2–2	4–1	2–2	1–1	0–0	1–0	—	1–0	2–3	0–0	1–0	2–1	0–1	1–0	2–0	2–1	3–1	4–2	4–0	0–2	1–2	4–0	2–0	0–1
Carl Zeiss Jena	1–1	2–2	0–1	1–0	1–1	1–2	0–0	—	1–1	0–1	2–1	3–1	3–1	1–2	2–1	2–1	1–0	1–1	2–1	2–0	1–0	6–2	4–0	0–0
Hannover 96	0–2	2–1	1–1	3–1	2–2	0–0	0–1	3–0	—	2–2	1–1	1–3	2–1	3–1	1–1	1–1	1–1	1–1	0–1	2–1	2–0	2–0	0–2	5–0
SV Meppen	3–1	1–0	0–2	0–0	0–0	1–1	2–0	1–2	4–1	—	1–1	0–0	1–1	1–0	1–0	0–0	2–0	0–1	1–0	1–0	0–2	2–0	0–0	1–1
Hansa Rostock	0–1	2–0	2–0	1–1	2–1	1–2	2–0	0–1	2–2	2–1	—	4–1	1–1	1–0	3–2	0–0	2–0	4–1	4–0	2–0	0–0	1–0	1–0	2–0
Mainz 05	0–2	1–1	1–3	1–2	3–2	0–0	1–2	2–0	1–1	3–0	1–0	—	0–1	2–1	2–1	0–0	2–2	0–0	0–2	2–3	0–0	3–0	1–0	0–1
Wuppertaler SV	4–1	1–1	1–0	4–3	1–2	1–2	2–0	2–2	0–0	0–1	2–0	3–1	—	4–1	1–0	0–1	3–0	0–0	0–1	1–1	2–0	2–0	1–0	3–0
VfL Wolfsburg	3–3	1–3	2–1	2–1	2–2	0–0	0–0	2–1	3–1	0–0	2–0	1–1	2–2	—	1–2	0–2	2–2	4–1	4–1	2–0	1–1	2–1	3–0	3–0
Stuttgarter Kickers	3–1	0–2	2–0	1–0	1–1	3–1	1–1	1–1	0–2	0–0	4–1	1–2	4–1	0–0	—	1–1	4–0	3–1	2–1	2–3	2–0	3–1	1–1	3–0
FC Homburg	1–5	0–0	0–0	1–2	0–3	2–0	4–2	1–0	1–2	1–1	0–0	0–0	2–1	1–0	3–0	—	0–0	2–1	3–2	3–1	5–0	3–4	1–1	2–3
FC St. Pauli	0–1	0–1	0–0	0–0	1–1	1–0	0–1	1–0	1–0	3–0	0–2	0–2	2–0	0–0	2–2	0–0	—	3–1	1–1	3–0	2–1	1–0	4–1	3–1
SpVgg Unterhaching	2–2	2–1	4–1	2–2	2–1	1–0	0–2	1–2	0–2	1–3	2–0	0–1	0–0	0–0	2–0	1–0	1–1	—	0–0	1–1	2–0	3–0	3–0	4–1
Eintracht Braunschweig	1–3	1–2	1–1	0–0	1–3	3–0	4–4	3–3	3–2	1–0	1–1	6–0	3–2	0–1	1–0	2–0	0–2	4–2	—	1–0	2–0	2–3	4–2	0–0
VfL Osnabrück	3–2	1–1	1–1	6–0	1–1	1–2	3–3	1–3	1–3	3–0	2–0	1–1	1–0	3–5	1–1	2–1	2–2	1–1	2–0	—	4–1	2–1	1–1	3–1
Fortuna Düsseldorf	1–3	1–0	0–1	2–3	1–3	0–0	1–1	2–2	0–1	0–0	1–1	1–2	0–0	1–2	0–1	0–1	2–0	2–0	2–0	3–1	—	3–0	1–1	4–1
VfB Oldenburg	2–2	0–1	3–3	2–2	1–1	0–1	1–0	0–2	1–1	4–1	2–1	0–3	0–0	4–1	3–2	2–2	2–0	0–1	1–0	2–3	5–3	—	2–1	1–0
FC Remscheid	1–5	2–3	2–3	2–2	2–1	2–0	1–0	2–0	0–3	2–1	3–1	0–1	1–1	2–2	0–0	0–0	1–1	0–3	3–4	1–0	3–2	1–1	—	1–2
Darmstadt 98	0–3	0–0	2–3	1–1	3–0	1–4	4–0	3–2	0–0	0–2	0–0	3–5	0–0	4–0	0–1	1–1	1–1	1–3	1–1	1–1	0–1	2–0	2–2	—

Source: DFB
Legend: Blue = home team win; Yellow = draw; Red = away team win.

== Top scorers ==
The league's top scorers:

Goals	Player	Team
27	(Germany) Siegfried Reich	VfL Wolfsburg
23	(Germany) Theo Gries	Hertha BSC Berlin
19	(Germany) Holger Aden	Eintracht Braunschweig
19	(Czech Republic) Radek Drulák	VfB Oldenburg
18	(Germany) Michael Hubner	FC 08 Homburg
17	(Nigeria) Jonathan Akpoborie	FC Carl Zeiss Jena
17	(Germany) Steffen Heidrich	Chemnitzer FC
17	(Germany) Michael Preetz	MSV Duisburg
17	(Germany) Michael Tönnies	Wuppertaler SV
16	(Albania) Altin Rraklli	SC Freiburg
