= 2015 DFB-Pokal final =

- Match programme cover
- Event: 2014–15 DFB-Pokal
Borussia Dortmund	VfL Wolfsburg
1	3
- Date: 30 May 2015
- Venue: Olympiastadion, Berlin
- Referee: Felix Brych (Munich)
- Attendance: 75,815
- Weather: Partly cloudy 13 °C (55 °F); 46% humidity

The 2015 DFB-Pokal final decided the winner of the 2014–15 DFB-Pokal, the 72nd season of Germany's premier football cup. It was played on 30 May 2015 at the Olympiastadion in Berlin.

Borussia Dortmund, runners-up in the previous final, faced VfL Wolfsburg, who won the game 3–1 to capture their first title, with all four goals in the first half.

As winners, Wolfsburg played against Bayern Munich, champions of the 2014–15 Bundesliga, in the 2015 DFL-Supercup, winning in a penalty shoot-out. Wolfsburg also would have qualified for the group stage of the 2015–16 UEFA Europa League, although they had already qualified for the 2015–16 UEFA Champions League via their league position. Because of this, the sixth-placed team in the Bundesliga, Schalke 04, earned automatic qualification for the group stage of next year's edition of the UEFA Europa League, and the league's third qualifying round spot went to the team in seventh, Borussia Dortmund; this was the first season in which the cup runners-up would not have qualified for the Europa League if the cup winner had qualified for the Champions League via their league position.

== Background ==
The match was Borussia Dortmund's seventh final in the competition, holding a record of three victories (most recently against Bayern Munich in 2012) and three defeats (most recently against the same opponents two years later). Wolfsburg's only prior appearance was in 1995, losing 3–0 to Borussia Mönchengladbach. Wolfsburg midfielder Junior Malanda died in a car accident in January 2015. In his honour, they wore shirts with his squad number 19 within a heart.

The final would be Jürgen Klopp's last match as Dortmund manager, after seven years in charge of the team.

== Route to the final ==
The DFB-Pokal began with 64 teams in a single-elimination knockout cup competition. There were a total of five rounds leading up to the final. Teams were drawn against each other, and the winner after 90 minutes advanced. If still tied, 30 minutes of extra time were played. If the score was still level, a penalty shoot-out was used to determine the winner.

Note: In all results below, the score of the finalist is given first (H: home; A: away).

Borussia Dortmund		Round	VfL Wolfsburg	
Opponent	Result	2014–15 DFB-Pokal	Opponent	Result
Stuttgarter Kickers (A)	4–1	First round	Darmstadt 98 (A)	0–0 (a.e.t.) (5–4 p)
FC St. Pauli (A)	3–0	Second round	1. FC Heidenheim (H)	4–1
Dynamo Dresden (A)	2–0	Round of 16	RB Leipzig (A)	2–0
1899 Hoffenheim (H)	3–2 (a.e.t.)	Quarter-finals	SC Freiburg (H)	1–0
Bayern Munich (A)	1–1 (a.e.t.) (2–0 p)	Semi-finals	Arminia Bielefeld (A)	4–0

=== Borussia Dortmund ===
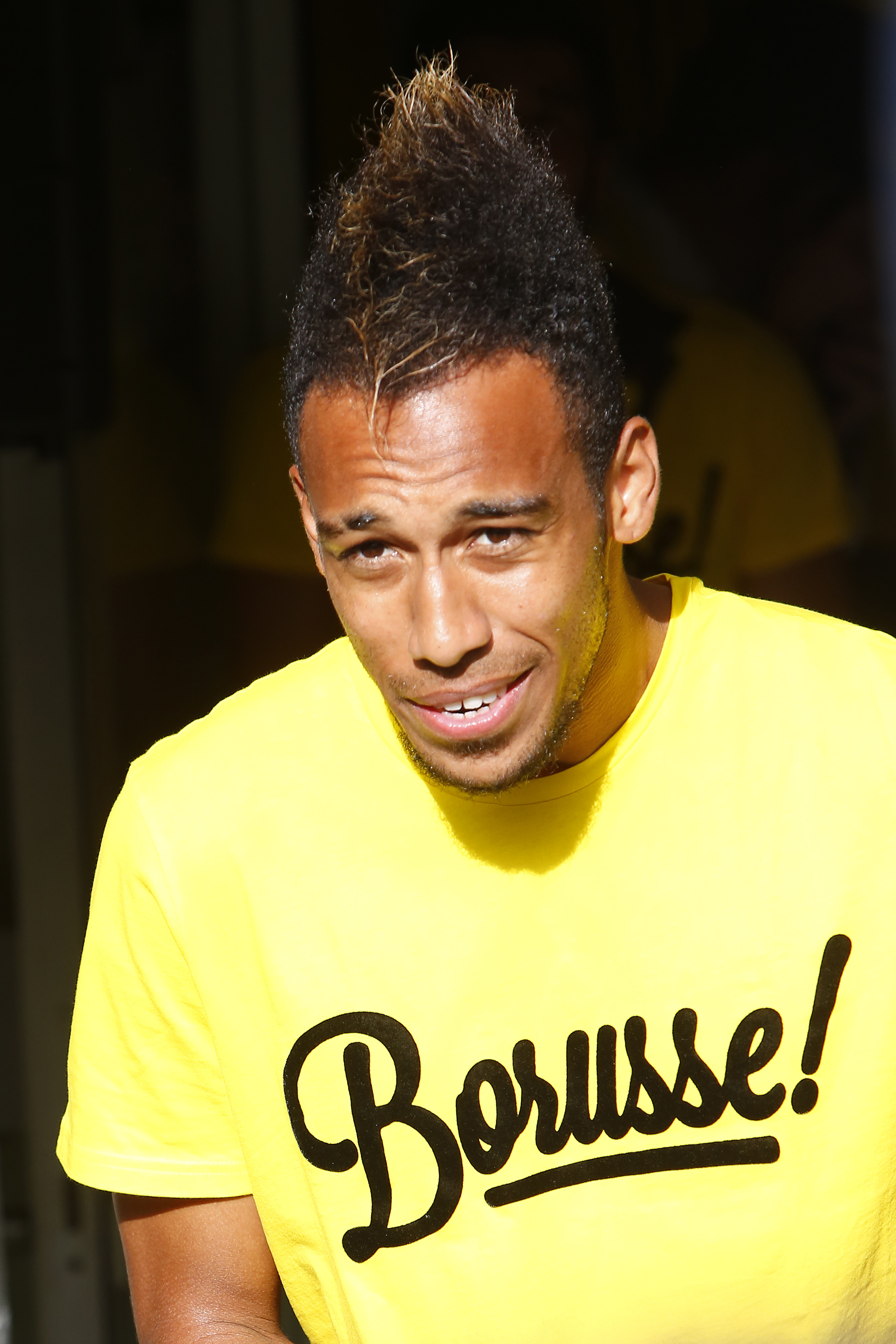
Pierre-Emerick Aubameyang scored four goals in Dortmund's run to the final, including their equaliser in the semi-finals

Borussia Dortmund, of the Bundesliga, started the tournament in the first round on 17 August 2014, playing away at 3. Liga club Stuttgarter Kickers, and winning 4–1 with goals by Henrikh Mkhitaryan, Pierre-Emerick Aubameyang (2) and Adrián Ramos. On 28 October, they played the second round away at FC St. Pauli of the 2. Bundesliga, winning 3–0 with goals from Ciro Immobile, Marco Reus and Shinji Kagawa. The third round on 3 March 2015 again had Dortmund travel, to third-tier Dynamo Dresden, where they won 2–0 from two goals by Immobile in the second half, after losing Reus to injury in the first half.

Dortmund's first home fixture of the tournament came in the quarter-finals on 7 April, against their first top-flight opponent, TSG 1899 Hoffenheim. They gained the lead when defender Neven Subotić volleyed from a corner kick, but within two minutes Kevin Volland equalised with his own volley. Shortly afterwards, Subotić's defensive error allowed Roberto Firmino to put Hoffenheim into the lead. In the second half, Aubameyang equalised for Dortmund, heading in Erik Durm's cross. The game went to extra time, in which Sebastian Kehl scored a long-range volleyed winner for Dortmund. On 28 April, Dortmund went to the Allianz Arena to face Bayern Munich in the semi-finals, a repeat of the last season's final. The hosts took the lead through Robert Lewandowski, whom they had signed from Dortmund in the summer, but Dortmund equalised with 15 minutes to play, Aubameyang finishing Mkhitaryan's cross. The game went to a penalty shootout, in which all four Bayern takers including goalkeeper Manuel Neuer missed, but Dortmund's İlkay Gündoğan and Kehl scored.

=== VfL Wolfsburg ===
VfL Wolfsburg, also of the Bundesliga, began in the first round away to 2. Bundesliga club SV Darmstadt 98 on 17 August. After a goalless draw, they won on penalties: Naldo missed their first attempt, but Maurice Exslager and Milan Ivana missed for the hosts. They then hosted a 4–1 win over second-tier 1. FC Heidenheim in the second round: despite conceding Marc Schnatterer's opener for the visitors, they replied with goals by Daniel Caligiuri, Bas Dost and Luiz Gustavo (2). In the third round on 4 March, they travelled to the Red Bull Arena where they defeated 2. Bundesliga club RB Leipzig 2–0, with a goal in either half from Caligiuri and Timm Klose.

In the quarter-finals on 7 April, Wolfsburg hosted their first top-flight opponent, SC Freiburg. In the second half, Caligiuri was fouled by Julian Schuster for a penalty, which Ricardo Rodríguez converted past Roman Bürki for the only goal of the game. They played away to third-tier DSC Arminia Bielefeld in the semi-finals 22 days later. Wolfsburg won 4–0, with two goals by Maximilian Arnold and further strikes by Luiz Gustavo and Ivan Perišić.

== Match ==
=== Details ===
30 May 2015
20:00 CEST

Borussia Dortmund	1–3	VfL Wolfsburg
Aubameyang 5'	Report	Luiz Gustavo 22'; De Bruyne 33'; Dost 38'

Olympiastadion, Berlin
Attendance: 75,815
Referee: Felix Brych (Munich)

Borussia Dortmund	VfL Wolfsburg

GK	22	(Australia) Mitchell Langerak
RB	37	(Germany) Erik Durm		(substituted off) 68'
CB	4	(Serbia) Neven Subotić
CB	15	(Germany) Mats Hummels (c)
LB	29	(Germany) Marcel Schmelzer	(yellow card) 84'
CM	5	(Germany) Sebastian Kehl		(substituted off) 68'
CM	8	(Germany) İlkay Gündoğan
RW	10	(Armenia) Henrikh Mkhitaryan	(yellow card) 61'
AM	7	(Japan) Shinji Kagawa
LW	11	(Germany) Marco Reus		(substituted off) 79'
CF	17	(Gabon) Pierre-Emerick Aubameyang
Substitutes:
GK	1	(Germany) Roman Weidenfeller
DF	25	(Greece) Sokratis Papastathopoulos
DF	26	(Poland) Łukasz Piszczek		(substituted on) 68'
DF	28	(Germany) Matthias Ginter
MF	6	(Germany) Sven Bender
MF	16	(Poland) Jakub Błaszczykowski		(substituted on) 68'
FW	9	(Italy) Ciro Immobile		(substituted on) 79'
Manager:
(Germany) Jürgen Klopp

GK	1	(Switzerland) Diego Benaglio (c)
RB	8	(Portugal) Vieirinha	(yellow card) 90+3'
CB	5	(Switzerland) Timm Klose
CB	25	(Brazil) Naldo
LB	34	(Switzerland) Ricardo Rodriguez
CM	27	(Germany) Maximilian Arnold		(substituted off) 81'
CM	22	(Brazil) Luiz Gustavo
RW	7	(Germany) Daniel Caligiuri		(substituted off) 85'
AM	14	(Belgium) Kevin De Bruyne	(yellow card) 88'
LW	9	(Croatia) Ivan Perišić		(substituted off) 74'
CF	12	(Netherlands) Bas Dost
Substitutes:
GK	20	(Germany) Max Grün
DF	4	(Germany) Marcel Schäfer
DF	15	(Germany) Christian Träsch		(substituted on) 85'
DF	31	(Germany) Robin Knoche
MF	17	(Germany) André Schürrle		(substituted on) 81'
MF	23	(France) Josuha Guilavogui		(substituted on) 74'
FW	3	(Denmark) Nicklas Bendtner
Manager:
(Germany) Dieter Hecking

Assistant referees:
Mark Borsch (Mönchengladbach)
Stefan Lupp (Zossen)
Fourth official:
Robert Hartmann (Wangen im Allgäu)

Match rules

- 90 minutes.
- 30 minutes of extra time if necessary.
- Penalty shoot-out if scores still level.
- Seven named substitutes, of which up to three may be used.
