= Tommy Reasoner =

American soccer player (born 1967)

Personal information
- Date of birth: October 27, 1967 (age 59)
- Place of birth: Garden City, Michigan, United States
- Height: 5 ft 8 in (1.73 m)
- Position: Defender

College career
Years	Team	Apps	(Gls)
1985–1986, 1988–1989	Tampa Spartans		

Senior career*
Years	Team	Apps	(Gls)
1989–1990	San Diego Nomads		
1991–1993	Tampa Bay Rowdies	48	(2)
1994	San Diego Sockers (indoor)	14	(3)
1995	San Diego Top Guns		
1996	Kansas City Wiz	13	(0)

International career
1987	U.S. U-20		
- * Club domestic league appearances and goals

Tommy Reasoner (born October 27, 1967, in Garden City, Michigan) is a retired U.S. soccer player who spent one season in Major League Soccer, two in the Western Soccer Alliance, four in the American Professional Soccer League and two in the Continental Indoor Soccer League. He was also part of the U.S. team at the 1987 FIFA World Youth Championship.

== Youth ==
Reasoner attended Tarpon Springs High School. In 1985, he entered the University of Tampa where he played on the school's NCAA Division II soccer team in 1985 and 1986 then again in 1988 and 1989. In 1989, he was selected as a first team All-American. In 1987, he took a year off from school in order to play for U.S. U-20 national team at the 1987 FIFA World Youth Championship. Reasoner played two games as the U.S. went 1–2 in group play.

== Professional ==
During the 1989 collegiate off-season, Reasoner played for the San Diego Nomads in the Western Soccer League. The Nomads won the league title which placed them in the national championship against the Fort Lauderdale Strikers of the American Soccer League, but Reasoner did not play in the title game. He returned to the Nomads for the 1990 season. By this time, the WSL had merged with the ASL to form the American Professional Soccer League. In 1990, the Cleveland Crunch selected Reasoner in the third round of the 1990 MSL Amateur Draft. However, it does not appear that he ever played for the Crunch. Instead, in 1991, he signed with the Tampa Bay Rowdies in the APSL. He would play for Tampa Bay through the 1993 season. The Rowdies folded at the end of the season. In April 1994, the San Diego Sockers selected Reasoner in the eighth round of the Continental Indoor Soccer League draft. He signed with the team on June 1, 1994. In 1995, he spent the season with the San Diego Top Guns in the USISL. In February 1996, the Kansas City Wiz selected Reasoner in the sixth round (56th overall) of the 1996 MLS Inaugural Player Draft. He played thirteen games for the Wiz in 1996 before being waived in November.
