= Alexander Opoku =

Ghanaian footballer

Personal information
- Full name: Nana Alexander Opoku
- Date of birth: 31 August 1974 (age 52)
- Place of birth: Sunyani, Ghana
- Height: 1.68 m (5 ft 6 in)
- Position: Midfielder

Senior career*
Years	Team	Apps	(Gls)
1989–1992	Brong Ahafo United		
1992–1998	VfB Leipzig	64	(4)
1998–1999	FC Remscheid	24	(2)
1999–2001	FSV Frankfurt	48	(5)
- SV Rot-Weiß Bad Muskau

International career
1991	Ghana U17		
Medal record
Representing Ghana
FIFA U-17 World Cup
Winner	Italy 1991	U-17 Team
- * Club domestic league appearances and goals

Alexander Opoku (born 31 August 1974) is a Ghanaian former professional footballer who played as a midfielder.

== Club career ==
Opoku played in Ghana for Brong Ahafo United from age 15, before moving to Germany where he joined VfB Leipzig. With Leipzig he played in the Bundesliga, making 10 appearances and scoring one goal. He made his debut in the 1993–94 season, coming off the bench in the 75th minute for Matthias Liebers against Eintracht Frankfurt on the eleventh matchday, as the match would finish in a 2–1 loss. Opoku's other appearances in the Bundesliga also remained winless, as Leipzig finished bottom of the table with only 17 points. After being relegated to the 2. Bundesliga, he made 54 appearances in the next four seasons and scored three goals.

Opoku left the club after the 1997–98 season, after Leipzig were once again relegated. He moved to FC Remscheid for one season, then to FSV Frankfurt in the Regionalliga Süd. Later he played for SV Rot-Weiß Bad Muskau.

== International career ==
Opoku was a member of the Ghana U17 that won the 1991 FIFA U-17 World Championship. He led the team, which was coached by Otto Pfister, as the captain.

== Honours ==
Ghana U17

- FIFA U-17 World Cup: 1991
