= Jacek Frąckiewicz =

Polish footballer (born 1969)

Personal information
- Full name: Jacek Frąckiewicz
- Date of birth: 19 September 1969 (age 57)
- Place of birth: Kwidzyn, Poland
- Height: 1.78 m (5 ft 10 in)
- Position: Striker

Senior career*
Years	Team	Apps	(Gls)
1987–1988	Lechia Gdańsk	11	(2)
1988–1991	Eintracht Braunschweig	15	(1)
1992–1995	VfL Wolfsburg	97	(28)
1995–1996	1. FC Union Berlin	32	(16)
1996–1998	Tennis Borussia Berlin	31	(5)
Total		186	(52)
- * Club domestic league appearances and goals

Jacek Frąckiewicz (born 19 September 1969) is a Polish former professional footballer who played as a striker.

Frąckiewicz, born in Sztum, played 11 games and scored two goals in the 1987–88 Ekstraklasa with Lechia Gdańsk in his native Poland before moving to Germany, aged 19, where he spent the rest of his career. In total, he amassed 17 goals in 83 2. Bundesliga appearances for Eintracht Braunschweig and VfL Wolfsburg and 21 goals in 63 Regionalliga Nordost games for 1. FC Union Berlin and Tennis Borussia Berlin.

== Honours ==
VfL Wolfsburg

- DFB-Pokal runner-up: 1994–95
