= Uwe Zimmermann =

German footballer and coach

Personal information
- Date of birth: 11 February 1962 (age 64)
- Place of birth: Kronau, West Germany
- Height: 1.86 m (6 ft 1 in)
- Position: Goalkeeper

Youth career
- VfR Kronau

Senior career*
Years	Team	Apps	(Gls)
1979–1990	SV Waldhof Mannheim	267	(0)
1990–1993	SC Fortuna Köln	70	(0)
1993–1999	VfL Wolfsburg	145	(0)
1999–2002	Eintracht Braunschweig	102	(0)
Total		584	(0)

International career
1983	West Germany U-21	4	(0)

Managerial career
- 2003–2006: Rot Weiss Ahlen (GK coach)
- 2007–2008: Sportfreunde Siegen (GK coach)
- * Club domestic league appearances and goals

Uwe 'Zimbo' Zimmermann (born 11 February 1962 in Kronau) is a German football coach and a former player. His son Simon Zimmermann is a professional footballer in the lower level German leagues.

== Honours ==
=== Club ===
VfL Wolfsburg

- DFB-Pokal finalist: 1994–95

=== Individual ===
- Most ever Bundesliga games for SV Waldhof Mannheim: 215
