= Stefan Meissner =

German footballer

Personal information
- Full name: Stefan Meissner
- Date of birth: 8 March 1973 (age 53)
- Place of birth: Bad Harzburg, West Germany
- Height: 1.81 m (5 ft 11 in)
- Position: Forward

Team information
- Current team: Bayern Munich U19 (assistant)

Youth career
- –1989: FG 16 Vienenburg
- 1989–1990: Eintracht Braunschweig

Senior career*
Years	Team	Apps	(Gls)
1990–1994	Eintracht Braunschweig	46	(14)
1994–1998	VfL Wolfsburg	114	(19)
1998–2000	Karlsruher SC	57	(11)
2000–2001	Stuttgarter Kickers	18	(0)
2001–2004	Chemnitzer FC	97	(19)
2005–2006	VfL Wolfsburg II	17	(5)
Total		349	(68)

International career
1994–1995	Germany U21	2	(0)

Managerial career
- 2010–2011: 1. FC Kaiserslautern U19 (assistant)
- 2011–2013: 1. FC Kaiserslautern U17
- 2013–2020: 1. FC Kaiserslautern Youth
- 2020–2023: Bayern Munich U17 (assistant)
- 2023–: Bayern Munich U19 (assistant)
- * Club domestic league appearances and goals

Stefan Meissner (born 8 March 1973) is a German former professional footballer who played as a forward. He spent one season in the Bundesliga with VfL Wolfsburg, as well as eight seasons in the 2. Bundesliga with Eintracht Braunschweig, Wolfsburg, Karlsruher SC, and Stuttgarter Kickers. Meissner had to retire from the game in 2006 due to a cartilage injury in his knee and currently works as an assistant coach at Bayern Munich U19.

== Honours ==
- DFB-Pokal: runner-up 1994–95
