= Ingo Saager =

German former footballer (born 1968)

Personal information
- Date of birth: 26 November 1968 (age 57)
- Place of birth: East Germany
- Height: 1.86 m (6 ft 1 in)
- Position: Goalkeeper

Youth career
- SG Motor Holzhausen
- –1987: 1. FC Lokomotive Leipzig

Senior career*
Years	Team	Apps	(Gls)
1987–1995	VfB Leipzig	31	(0)
1995–1997	FC Sachsen Leipzig	43	(0)
1997–1999	FSV Lok/Altmark Stendal	28	(0)
Total		102	(0)

International career
- East Germany Youth
- * Club domestic league appearances and goals

Ingo Saager (born 26 November 1968) is a German former footballer who played as a goalkeeper.

== Career ==
Saager's career began in the late 1980s with Lokomotive Leipzig, where he competed with Maik Kischko to serve as understudy to East Germany international 'keeper René Müller. When Müller left the club in 1991, Saager appeared to have won the race to be his successor, playing in 21 of 26 games in the 1990–91 season. However, the following year, he lost his place to Kischko, and was briefly reduced to third choice with the signing of Peter Disztl from Rot-Weiß Erfurt. Disztl left at the end of the season, Saager settled into the role of second choice goalkeeper, with the club (now called VfB Leipzig) having qualified for the 2. Bundesliga following German reunification. In 1993, VfB earned promotion to the Bundesliga, where they spent one season – Saager started the last two games, to date the club's last matches at this level. Both ended in defeat, to Hamburger SV (1–0) and then Bayer Leverkusen (3–2), but Saager performed creditably, saving a penalty from Rodolfo Esteban Cardoso in the former. After one more season as backup goalkeeper in the second division, Saager left VfB to join their city rivals FC Sachsen Leipzig of the Regionalliga Nordost. He spent two years there, and a further two with FSV Lokomotive Altmark Stendal before retiring from football in 1999.

Saager represented East Germany at the 1987 FIFA World Youth Championship in Chile. He took the place of Holger Hiemann after the first game of the tournament, and played in the remaining five as the team reached the semi-finals and finished third.
