= Marco Sinigaglia =

Italian footballer (born 1968)

Personal information
- Date of birth: 29 February 1968 (age 58)
- Place of birth: Bollate
- Position: Midfielder

Senior career*
Years	Team	Apps	(Gls)
1986–1991	Como		
1987–1988	→ Sambenedettese		
1991–1995	Torino		
1992–1993	→ Monza		
1995–1997	Chievo Verona		
- * Club domestic league appearances and goals

Marco Sinigaglia (born 29 February 1968) is a retired Italian football midfielder. He was a squad member for the 1987 FIFA World Youth Championship.
