= John Butler (footballer, born 1969) =

Scottish footballer

Personal information
- Date of birth: 25 January 1969 (age 57)
- Place of birth: Bellshill, Scotland
- Position: Midfielder

Youth career
- Orbiston

Senior career*
Years	Team	Apps	(Gls)
1985–1988	St Mirren	11	(0)
1987	→ Stirling Albion (loan)	15	(5)
1988–1992	Airdrieonians	46	(5)
1992	→ Stranraer (loan)	2	(0)
Total		74	(10)

International career
- Scotland Youth
- * Club domestic league appearances and goals

John Butler (born 25 January 1969) is a Scottish former professional footballer who played as a midfielder.

== Career ==
Born in Bellshill, Butler played for Orbiston, St Mirren, Stirling Albion, Airdrieonians and Stranraer before retiring due to injury. In 1992, prior to his injury, he had signed a "dream" two-year contract with Australian side Sydney Croatia, but suffered an ankle injury whilst playing on loan at Stranraer. Butler spent 18 months with his ankle in plaster, and later worked in a pub for a few years before becoming unemployed and on state benefits in 1997.

He was a Scotland youth international, and participated at the 1987 FIFA World Youth Championship.
