= Héctor Cabello =

Chilean footballer

Personal information
- Full name: Héctor Antonio Cabello Tabilo
- Date of birth: 14 January 1968 (age 58)
- Place of birth: La Serena, Chile
- Position: Attacking midfielder

Youth career
- Jesús Herrera
- 1979–1982: Deportes La Serena

Senior career*
Years	Team	Apps	(Gls)
1982–1993	Deportes La Serena		
1993	Coquimbo Unido	22	(1)
1994	Regional Atacama	24	(1)
1995–1998	Coquimbo Unido	107	(21)
1999	Santiago Wanderers		
2000	Deportes La Serena		

International career
1987	Chile U20	8	(0)
- * Club domestic league appearances and goals

Héctor Antonio Cabello Tabilo (born 14 January 1968) is a Chilean former football player who played as an attacking midfielder.

== Club career ==
Born in La Serena, Chile, Cabello is a product of the local team, Deportes La Serena. He is considered a historical player of them as well as of the classic rival, Coquimbo Unido.

After spending ten seasons with Deportes La Serena until the 1992 season, also winning the 1987 Segunda División, Cabello switched to Coquimbo Unido in 1993. After playing for Regional Atacama in 1994, he rejoined them in 1995 for four years, always in the Chilean Primera División.

His last clubs were Santiago Wanderers in 1999 and Deportes La Serena in 2000, both in the Primera B.

== International career ==
Cabello represented the Chile national under-20 team at the 1987 South American Championship and the 1987 FIFA World Youth Championship, where they reached the fourth place.

== Personal life ==
Cabello is nicknamed Kunta, like the main character of the TV miniseries Roots, Kunta Kinte.

Cabello has worked in mining.
