= Mincho Minchev =

Bulgarian footballer

Personal information
- Date of birth: 31 October 1967 (age 59)
- Place of birth: Bulgaria
- Position: Forward

Senior career*
Years	Team	Apps	(Gls)
1986–1987	Dimitrovgrad		
1988–1990	Etar Veliko Tarnovo		
1990	Lokomotiv Plovdiv	7	(0)
1991	Radnički Beograd	8	(0)
1992	Botev Plovdiv		
1995–1996	Spartak Plovdiv		

International career
1987	Bulgaria U20		
- * Club domestic league appearances and goals

Mincho Minchev (Bulgarian: Минчо Минчев; born 31 October 1967) is a Bulgarian former professional footballer who played as a forward.

== Club career ==
Minchev played with FC Dimitrovgrad in their season in A PFG after they reached promotion in 1986. Later he played with F.C. Etar and Lokomotiv Plovdiv in Bulgarian top-tier, before he moved abroad, during the winter-break of the 1990–91 season, when he joined Serbian club FK Radnički Beograd playing with them in the second half of the 1990–91 Yugoslav Second League. He played with Radnički Belgrade also the first half of the 1991–92 Yugoslav Second League, but during the winter-break he returned to Bulgaria and joined top-league side Botev Plovdiv. He later played with Spartak Plovdiv in 1995–96 A Group.

Mincho Minchev was part of the Bulgarian U-20 squad at the 1987 FIFA World Youth Championship.
