= René Schmidt =

German footballer

Personal information
- Date of birth: October 30, 1974 (age 52)
- Place of birth: Germany
- Position: Midfielder

Youth career
- –1993: VfB Leipzig

Senior career*
Years	Team	Apps	(Gls)
1993–1997	VfB Leipzig	28	(0)
1997	KFC Uerdingen	12	(1)
1997–1998	FSV Zwickau	21	(4)
1998–2000	Dynamo Dresden	2	(0)
Total		63	(5)
- * Club domestic league appearances and goals

René Schmidt (born October 30, 1974) is a German former professional footballer who played for Dynamo Dresden, FSV Zwickau, KFC Uerdingen and VfB Leipzig.
