= Frank Edmond =

German former footballer

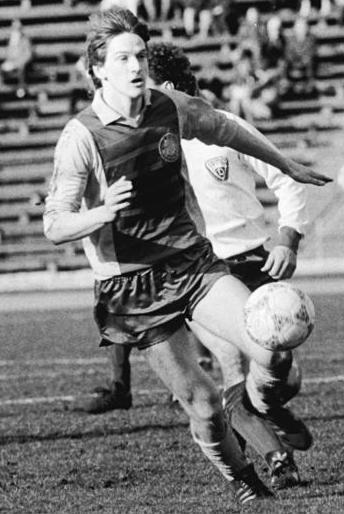

Personal information
- Date of birth: 23 December 1966 (age 59)
- Place of birth: Leisnig, East Germany
- Height: 1.86 m (6 ft 1 in)
- Position: Defender

Youth career
- BSG Motor Leisnig
- –1979: Chemie Böhlen
- 1979–1985: Lokomotive Leipzig

Senior career*
Years	Team	Apps	(Gls)
1985–1999	VfB Leipzig	349	(21)
1999–2002	Eintracht Braunschweig	58	(10)
Total		407	(31)

International career
	East Germany U-21	15	(0)
- * Club domestic league appearances and goals

Frank Edmond (born 23 December 1966) is a German former footballer.
