= Carlos Pimiento =

Colombian footballer (born 1968)

Personal information
- Full name: Carlos Gregorio Pimiento Torres
- Date of birth: 15 October 1968 (age 58)
- Place of birth: Colombia
- Position: Forward

Senior career*
Years	Team	Apps	(Gls)
- Deportes Tolima
–1990	Deportivo Cali		
1990–1991	CSKA Sofia	7	(2)
- * Club domestic league appearances and goals

Carlos Pimiento (born 15 October 1968) is a Colombian retired footballer.

He played as a forward for Colombian sides Deportes Tolima and Deportivo Cali, before he moved abroad along Bernardo Redín nd joining PFC CSKA Sofia becoming the two pioneer Colombian players in Bulgaria.
