= Guillermo Velasco =

Chilean footballer

Personal information
- Full name: Guillermo Orlando Velasco Leiva
- Date of birth: 2 June 1968 (age 58)
- Place of birth: Valparaíso, Chile
- Position: Goalkeeper

Youth career
- California Quilpué
- Everton

Senior career*
Years	Team	Apps	(Gls)
1985–1988	Everton	3	(0)
1989–1991	Santiago Wanderers	68	(0)
1992	Universidad Católica	0	(0)
1993	Coquimbo Unido	0	(0)
1994	Cobresal	8	(0)

International career
1987	Chile U20	6	(0)
- * Club domestic league appearances and goals

Guillermo Orlando Velasco Leiva (born 2 June 1968) is a Chilean former football player who played as a goalkeeper.

== Career ==
Born in Valparaíso, Chile, Velasco was trained at club California from Quilpué and Everton de Viña del Mar. He made his professional debut in 1985 and spent four seasons with Everton in the Chilean Primera División, switching to the classic rival, Santiago Wanderers for the 1989 Segunda División, becoming the best goalkeeper of the season and getting the promotion to the Chilean top division.

Having developed almost all his career in the Chilean top level, Velasco also played for Universidad Católica, Coquimbo Unido and Cobresal.

Velasco retired at the end of the 1994 season.

== International career ==
Velasco represented Chile U20 in the 1987 FIFA World Championship. He played all matches and Chile reached the fourth place.

== Personal life ==
Velasco has worked in mining industry.
