= Hamed Al-Jazaf =

Bahraini footballer

Hamad Al Jazzaf
Personal information
- Date of birth: 22 January 1969 (age 57)
- Place of birth: Bahrain
- Position: Midfielder

International career
| Years | Team | Apps | (Gls) |
| 1987–1994 | Bahrain | 5 | (0) |

Hamed Al Jazaf (born 20 October 1969) is a Bahraini former midfielder who played for the Bahrain national football team in the Asian Cup tournament.

== International records ==
| Year | Apps | Goal |
|---|---|---|
| 1987 | 2 | 0 |
| 1994 | 3 | 0 |
| Total | 5 | 0 |
