= Peter Nielsen (footballer) =

Danish footballer and manager

Personal information
- Date of birth: 3 June 1968 (age 58)
- Place of birth: Copenhagen, Denmark
- Height: 1.80 m (5 ft 11 in)
- Position: Midfielder

Team information
- Current team: Fremad Amager (assistant)

Senior career*
Years	Team	Apps	(Gls)
- Fremad Amager
–1992	Lyngby BK		
1992–1996	Borussia Mönchengladbach	101	(4)
1996–1999	F.C. Copenhagen	52	(6)
1999–2002	Borussia Mönchengladbach	88	(4)
2002–2003	F.C. Copenhagen	46	(6)

International career
1988–1989	Denmark U-21	8	(0)
1992–2002	Denmark	10	(1)

Managerial career
- 2005: B.93 (assistant)
- 2005: KB (youth)
- 2006–2008: F.C. Copenhagen (assistant)
- 2016–: Fremad Amager (assistant)
Medal record
Men's football
Representing Denmark
UEFA European Championship
Winner	1992 Sweden
- * Club domestic league appearances and goals

Peter Nielsen (born 3 June 1968) is a Danish former professional footballer, who works as assistant manager for Danish 1st Division club Fremad Amager. He won ten international caps and scored one goal for the Denmark national team, with whom he won Euro 1992, though he did not play at the tournament.

== Career ==
Nielsen started his career in the Danish 3rd Division with BK Fremad Amager, where he helped them getting promoted to the second tier. Then he played with Lyngby Boldklub, where he won the Danish Championship in 1992. He moved abroad to play for Borussia Mönchengladbach in the Bundesliga, before ending his career with F.C. Copenhagen back in Denmark, where he was the club captain. He retired in 2003.

He began a coaching career in 2005. First as an assistant manager in B93, then training the youth team at Kjøbenhavns Boldklub.

From 1 January 2006 to 26 May 2008 he was Ståle Solbakken's assistant manager in F.C. Copenhagen. He stopped after a period way from the team as he was absent owing to illness. Later he became the assistent coach at Fremad Amager.

== Honours ==
- UEFA Euro: 1992
- DFB-Pokal: 1994–95
- Danish Championship: 1991-92, 2002-03
