= Steffen Heidrich =

German footballer

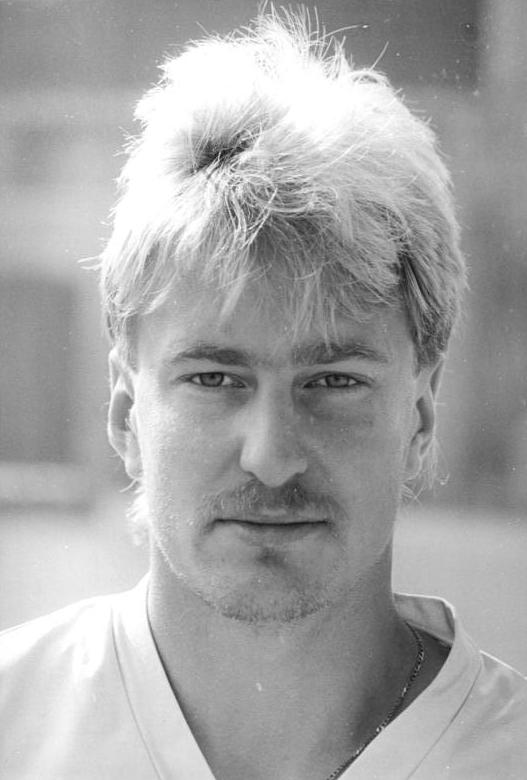
- Heidrich in 1990

Personal information
- Full name: Steffen Heidrich
- Date of birth: 19 July 1967 (age 59)
- Place of birth: Erlabrunn, Bezirk Karl-Marx-Stadt, East Germany
- Height: 1.81 m (5 ft 11 in)
- Position: Attacking midfielder

Youth career
- –1980: BSG Messgeräte Beierfeld
- 1980–1984: FC Karl-Marx-Stadt

Senior career*
Years	Team	Apps	(Gls)
1984–1993	FC Karl-Marx-Stadt/Chemnitzer FC	201	(60)
1993–1998	VfB Leipzig	143	(46)
1998–2001	Energie Cottbus	39	(13)
2001–2005	Dynamo Dresden	86	(21)
Total		469	(140)

International career
1982	East Germany U18	1	(0)
1986–1987	East Germany U21	9	(2)
1990	East Germany B	1	(0)
1990	East Germany	1	(0)
- * Club domestic league appearances and goals

Steffen Heidrich (born 19 July 1967) is a German former professional footballer who played as an attacking midfielder.

== Career ==
=== As a player ===
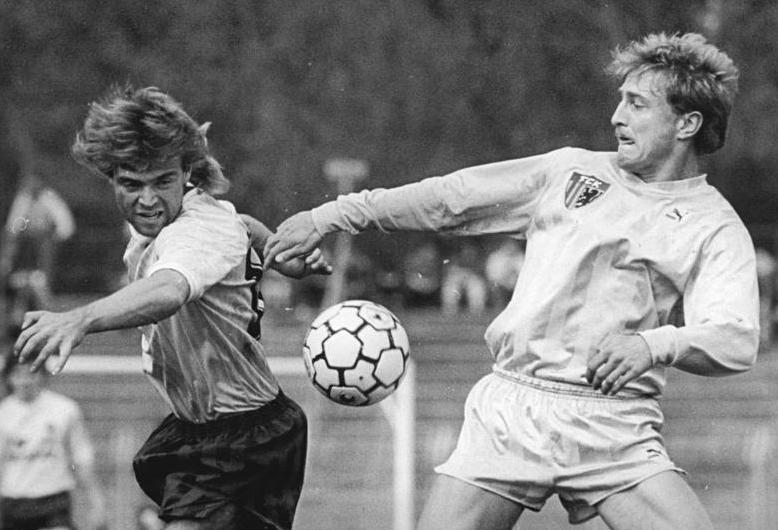
Heidrich (right) in 1990, playing for FC Karl-Marx-Stadt against Lokomotive Leipzig

In his youth Steffen Heidrich played for BSG Messgeräte Beierfeld and in 1980 he began his career with FC Karl-Marx-Stadt, and quickly became an important first-team player, as the club enjoyed relative success in the late 1980s. He earned one cap for East Germany, as a substitute for Rico Steinmann in a match against Egypt shortly before reunification. From December 1984, Heidrich played 128 games for FCK and its successor Chemnitzer FC in the GDR Oberliga, scoring 31 goals. He was an important part of the team which experienced its most successful time in the late 1980s after the 1966–67 championship season.

He stayed at Chemnitzer FC (as the club was now renamed), playing in the 2. Bundesliga until 1993, when he joined VfB Leipzig, just promoted to the Bundesliga. Heidrich played thirty times in the Bundesliga scoring four goals, as VfB were relegated. He remained with the club for four years, where he was a regular first-team player and a consistent goalscorer. However, they suffered a second relegation in 1998, and Heidrich moved on to FC Energie Cottbus, who had been promoted in their place. He captained Energie to their first ever promotion to the Bundesliga in 2000, but only made two appearances in the top flight, and left at the end of the 2000–01 season, joining Dynamo Dresden. He helped Dynamo earn promotion to the 2. Bundesliga in 2004, but injury restricted him to just eight appearances, and he retired in 2005.

=== As a manager ===
Heidrich then took up the role of general manager at Dynamo Dresden, and later Energie Cottbus. From 1 June 2006 to 10 August 2009, the former leading player took over the position of manager in Lausitz. With his resignation as manager, he assumed responsibility for the relegation to the 2nd division. On 9 January 2012, FC Erzgebirge Aue introduced Heidrich as the new sporting director in a press conference. After the team had only picked up one point from five games, the club announced the separation from Heidrich on 4 March 2013.

== Private life ==
Heidrich is married to a lawyer and has a daughter (born in 2004). He lives with his family in Dresden-Langebrück. At the TU Dresden he completed his studies as a club manager.

== Literature ==
- Andreas Baingo, Michael Hohlfied: GDR football selection players. The encyclopaedia. Sports Publisher Berlin, Berlin 2000, ISBN 3-328-00875-6, page 62, 63
- Michael Horn, Gottfried Weise: The big encyclopaedia of East German football. Schwarzkopf and Schwarzkopf, Berlin 2004, ISBN 3-89602-536-8, page 148
