= Alfonso Diaz =

Colombian director

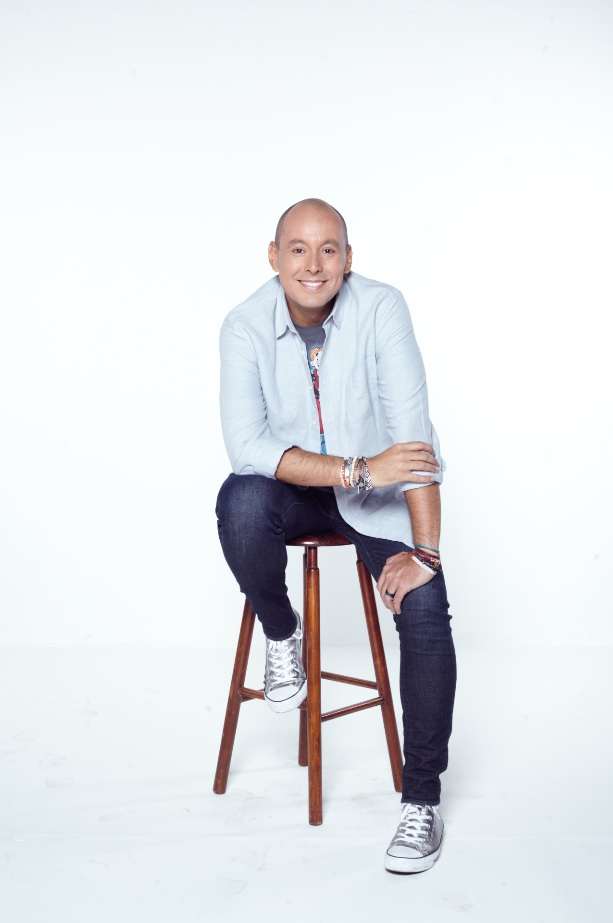

Alfonso Díaz is a media relations and corporate communications specialist, entertainment journalist, TV host and interviewer, formerly director and host with the international network, Canal Nuestra Tele Internacional. He also served as the entertainment correspondent for NTN24, the international news station geared to Spanish speaking audiences around the world. His show "Tenemos Que Hablar" reaches more than 20 countries.

Diaz has interviewed countless personalities in many diverse settings - on the red carpet, at press junkets, concerts and openings. These include Julianne Moore, Kristen Stewart, George Clooney, Robert de Niro, Patrick Stewart, James Franco, Laverne Cox and Sofia Vergara amongst others.
