= Thomas Radlspeck =

German footballer

Personal information
- Date of birth: 16 November 1972 (age 53)
- Place of birth: Munich, West Germany
- Height: 1.85 m (6 ft 1 in)
- Positions: Midfielder; forward

Youth career
- SV Otzing
- –1993: MSV München

Senior career*
Years	Team	Apps	(Gls)
1993–1995	Bayern Munich (A)		
1995–1998	SpVgg Unterhaching	94	(8)
1998–1999	SC Freiburg	1	(0)
1999–2000	Grazer AK	22	(0)
2000–2001	Jahn Regenbsurg	19	(1)
- * Club domestic league appearances and goals

Thomas Radlspeck (born 16 November 1972) is a German former professional footballer who played as a midfielder or forward.
