= Matthias Zimmermann (footballer, born 1970) =

German footballer

Personal information
- Date of birth: 14 September 1970 (age 56)
- Place of birth: Trostberg, West Germany
- Height: 1.82 m (6 ft 0 in)
- Position: Midfielder

Senior career*
Years	Team	Apps	(Gls)
–1992	TSV Trostberg		
1992–1994	SV Wacker Burghausen		
1994–1996	Bayern Munich (A)	58	(9)
1996–2005	SpVgg Unterhaching	240	(25)
2005–2006	Bayern Munich II	21	(0)
- * Club domestic league appearances and goals as of 17:16, 4 February 2009 (UTC)

Matthias Zimmermann (born 14 September 1970 in Trostberg) is a German former footballer. He played for two seasons in the Bundesliga with SpVgg Unterhaching.

== Honours ==
FC Bayern Munich II

- IFA Shield: 2005
