= Serhiy Dikhtiar =

Ukrainian footballer

Personal information
- Date of birth: 26 August 1975 (age 51)
- Place of birth: Ukraine
- Height: 1.70 m (5 ft 7 in)
- Position: Midfielder

Youth career
- –1992: Dynamo Kyiv
- 1992–1994: Schalke 04

Senior career*
Years	Team	Apps	(Gls)
1994–1996	Schalke 04	13	(2)
1996–2000	SG Wattenscheid 09	61	(6)
2000–2001	1. FC Saarbrücken	20	(1)
2002–2003	SG Wattenscheid 09	27	(1)
2003–2004	SV Meppen		
2004–2009	BV Cloppenburg	36	(3)
2009–2012	BSV Schwarz-Weiß Rehden		
- * Club domestic league appearances and goals

Serhiy Dikhtiar (Ukrainian: Сергій Діхтяр, Russian: Серге́й Дихтяр; transliterated also as Serhij Dychtjar or Sergej Dichtiar; born 26 August 1975) is a Ukrainian former professional football midfielder who spent all of his professional career playing in Germany.
