= Tobias Hager =

German footballer

Personal information
- Date of birth: 13 August 1973 (age 53)
- Place of birth: Germany
- Height: 1.84 m (6 ft 1/2 in)
- Position: Midfielder

Senior career*
Years	Team	Apps	(Gls)
–1996	Bayern Munich (A)		
1996–1998	SpVgg Unterhaching	6	(0)

International career
1994	Germany U-21	3	(0)
- * Club domestic league appearances and goals

Tobias Hager (born 13 August 1973) is a German former footballer who played as a midfielder. He played for a number of years for Bayern Munich's reserve team, before moving across town to SpVgg Unterhaching in 1996. In two years with the club, he made six appearances in the 2. Bundesliga. He was also capped three times for the Germany under-21 team in 1994.
