= Elvis Hajradinović =

Macedonian footballer

Personal information
- Date of birth: 1 August 1972 (age 53)
- Place of birth: SFR Yugoslavia
- Height: 1.86 m (6 ft 1 in)
- Position: Defender

Senior career*
Years	Team	Apps	(Gls)
1989–1990	Vardar		
1990–1993	1. FC Kaiserslautern	1	(0)
1993–1994	Borussia Dortmund		
1994–1996	SC Paderborn 07	41	(5)
1996–1997	Wuppertaler SV	10	(0)
1997–1999	Rot-Weiss Essen	7	(0)
- * Club domestic league appearances and goals

Elvis Hajradinović (Macedonian: Eлвиc Xajpaдинoвиќ; born 1 August 1972) is a Macedonian former footballer who played as a defender. He spent the majority of his career in the German Regionalliga West.
