= Peter Nieketien =

Nigerian footballer

Personal information
- Full name: Peter Nieketien
- Date of birth: 26 November 1968 (age 57)
- Place of birth: Port Harcourt, Nigeria
- Height: 1.78 m (5 ft 10 in)
- Position: Midfielder

Youth career
- 1984: Ranchers Bees
- 1986: Julius Berger F.C.

Senior career*
Years	Team	Apps	(Gls)
1987–1988	Iwuanyanwu Nationale	33	(5)
1989	AS Douanes	13	(1)
1990	ASMO FC	5	(0)
1991	Delta FC	7	(3)
1992–1993	Kedah FA	33	(14)
1994–1995	Terengganu FA	6	(4)
1996–1997	SG Bad Soden	65	(12)

International career
1984–1985	Nigeria U-17	8	(1)
1986–1987	Nigeria U-20	5	(1)
- * Club domestic league appearances and goals

Peter Edis Nieketien (born 26 November 1968) is a Nigerian former football player.

== Career ==
He has professional played with Iwuanyanwu Nationale, Julius Berger F.C., Kedah FA and Terengganu FA in Malaysia. In the early 1990s, he played for Gabonese clubs AS Douanes, ASMO FC and Delta Téléstar Gabon Télécom FC. He played his last two seasons in Germany for SG Bad Soden and retired in summer 1997.

== International career ==
Nieketien played for the Nigeria national under-20 football team the 1987 FIFA World Youth Championship in Chile and earned three matches in the tournament.
