= Andreas Clauß =

German footballer

Personal information
- Date of birth: 13 January 1969
- Place of birth: Mannheim, West Germany
- Height: 1.86 m (6 ft 1 in)
- Position: Goalkeeper

Youth career
- Phönix Bellheim

Senior career*
Years	Team	Apps	(Gls)
1987–1997	Waldhof Mannheim		
1997–1999	Kickers Offenbach		
1999–2003	Darmstadt 98		
2003–2007	1. FC Kaiserslautern II		
2006	1. FC Kaiserslautern	0	(0)
2007–2009	Waldhof Mannheim		
2010–2011	Waldhof Mannheim		

International career
1987	West Germany U20		

Managerial career
- 2007–2009: Waldhof Mannheim (goalkeeper coach)
- 2009–2013: Waldhof Mannheim (assistant coach)
- 2013: Waldhof Mannheim
- 2016–2020: 1. FC Kaiserslautern II (assistant coach)
- * Club domestic league appearances and goals

Andreas Clauß (born 13 January 1969) is a German football coach and former player who played as a goalkeeper. He was a squad member for the 1987 FIFA World Youth Championship.
