= Florian Weichert =

German footballer

- Florian Weichert with Hansa Rostock in 1990

Personal information
- Date of birth: January 28, 1968 (age 58)
- Place of birth: Rostock, East Germany
- Position: Forward

Youth career
- 1975–1985: Hansa Rostock

Senior career*
Years	Team	Apps	(Gls)
1985–1998	Hansa Rostock	8	(0)
1988–1989	Schiffahrt Hafen/Rostock	21	(8)
1989–1992	Hansa Rostock	82	(19)
1992–1993	Hamburger SV	21	(4)
1993–1994	VfB Leipzig	14	(3)
1994–1995	Dynamo Dresden	14	(1)
1995–1997	VfB Leipzig	50	(4)
Total		210	(39)
- * Club domestic league appearances and goals

Florian Weichert (born January 28, 1968) is a German former footballer.
