= Gary Ogilvie =

Scottish footballer

Personal information
- Full name: Gary Francis Ogilvie
- Date of birth: 16 November 1967 (age 58)
- Place of birth: Dundee, Scotland
- Position: Right-back

Youth career
- Royals Boys Club
- 1987–1988: Dundee

Senior career*
Years	Team	Apps	(Gls)
1988–1989	Sunderland	1	(0)
1989	Airdrieonians	8	(0)
- Forfar Albion
Total		9	(0)
- * Club domestic league appearances and goals

Gary Francis Ogilvie (born 1967) is a Scottish former footballer who played for Sunderland and Airdrieonians. He currently serves as Head of Recruitment for his former youth team, Dundee, from 2022.

After retiring as a professional footballer, Ogilvie became a police officer.
