= Franklin Bittencourt =

Brazilian football scout, coach, and former player

Personal information
- Full name: Franklin Spencer Miguel Bittencourt
- Date of birth: 24 February 1969 (age 57)
- Place of birth: Rio de Janeiro, Brazil
- Height: 1.72 m (5 ft 8 in)
- Position: Striker

Team information
- Current team: Energie Cottbus (scout)

Youth career
- 1985–1990: Fluminense

Senior career*
Years	Team	Apps	(Gls)
1991	Bragantino	2	(1)
1992–1998	VfB Leipzig	105	(20)
1998–2003	Energie Cottbus	84	(22)
Total		191	(43)

Managerial career
- 2005–2006: Energie Cottbus II (assistant)
- 2006–2009: Energie Cottbus (assistant)
- * Club domestic league appearances and goals

Franklin Spencer Miguel Bittencourt (born 24 February 1969) is a Brazilian former professional football striker who works as a scout and youth coach with Energie Cottbus.

== Personal life ==
Bittencourt was born in Rio de Janeiro, Brazil.

After ending his professional career he played for lower league sides SV Victoria Seelow and Blau-Gelb Laubsdorf.

His son Leonardo is a professional footballer.
