= Jann Jensen =

Danish football manager and former player (born 1969)

Personal information
- Date of birth: 22 February 1969 (age 57)
- Height: 1.82 m (5 ft 11 1/2 in)
- Position: Defender

Team information
- Current team: OKS (youth manager)

Senior career*
Years	Team	Apps	(Gls)
- B 1909
1988–1992	1. FC Köln	42	(0)
1993–1998	VfL Wolfsburg	133	(2)
1998–2001	Odense Boldklub		
2001–2003	HFK Sønderjylland		
2003–2005	Dalum IF		

International career
1984	Denmark U17	6	(0)
1985–1987	Denmark U19	15	(0)
1986–1989	Denmark U21	8	(0)

Managerial career
- 2005: Dalum IF
- 2006–2008: FC Fyn (assistant)
- 20XX–2015: Odense Boldklub (women youth)
- 2015–: OKS (youth)
- * Club domestic league appearances and goals

Jann Jensen (born 22 February 1969) is a Danish football coach and a former player who is currently a youth coach at OKS.

== Honours ==
- Bundesliga runner-up: 1988–89, 1989–90
- DFB-Pokal finalist: 1990–91, 1994–95
