= Frank Lieberam =

German footballer (born 1962)

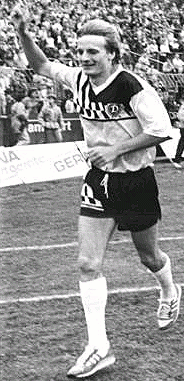
- Lieberam in 1989

Personal information
- Date of birth: 17 December 1962 (age 63)
- Place of birth: Halberstadt, East Germany
- Height: 1.80 m (5 ft 11 in)
- Positions: Centre-back; sweeper

Youth career
- –1981: 1. FC Magdeburg

Senior career*
Years	Team	Apps	(Gls)
1981–1983	1. FC Magdeburg	11	(1)
1983–1984	Lok Halberstadt		
1984–1985	1. FC Magdeburg.	4	(0)
1985–1986	Stahl Riesa	25	(3)
1986–1991	Dynamo Dresden	123	(6)
1992	Hyundai Horangi	19	(1)
1992–1996	VfL Wolfsburg	111	(5)
1996–1998	1. FC Magdeburg	55	(5)

International career
1989	East Germany	1	(0)

Managerial career
- 1998–1999: Erzgebirge Aue
- 2000–2004: Germania Halberstadt
- 2004–2005: Union Berlin
- 2006–2007: MSV Neuruppin
- * Club domestic league appearances and goals

Frank Lieberam (born 17 December 1962) is a German former football player and manager.

== Playing career ==
Lieberam was born in Halberstadt, East Germany. He started his senior playing career at DDR-Oberliga side 1. FC Magdeburg in 1982. In 1985, he left for BSG Stahl Riesa where he spent only one season, before moving on to SG Dynamo Dresden in 1986. He was a Stasi informant. After German reunification, he played in five Bundesliga matches with Dresden, before he transferred to K-League side Hyundai Horang-i in the winter-break. After six months he was signed by then-2. Bundesliga side VfL Wolfsburg. Later he returned to the 1. FC Magdeburg and his home town club Germania Halberstadt. At the height of his performance at Dynamo Dresden in the spring of 1989 Lieberam won one cap for the East Germany national team.

== Coach and manager ==
After his playing career he took up managing, starting at FC Erzgebirge Aue in July 1998. He stayed on until April 1999 and later took over Germania Halberstadt in 2000. After he was sacked in Halberstadt in November 2004, he was hired by 1. FC Union Berlin where he stayed until he was fired in December 2005. In November 2006, he took on the manager position at MSV Neuruppin, but left the club over difficulties financing his ambitions in June 2007.
