= Holger Hiemann =

German footballer (born 1968)

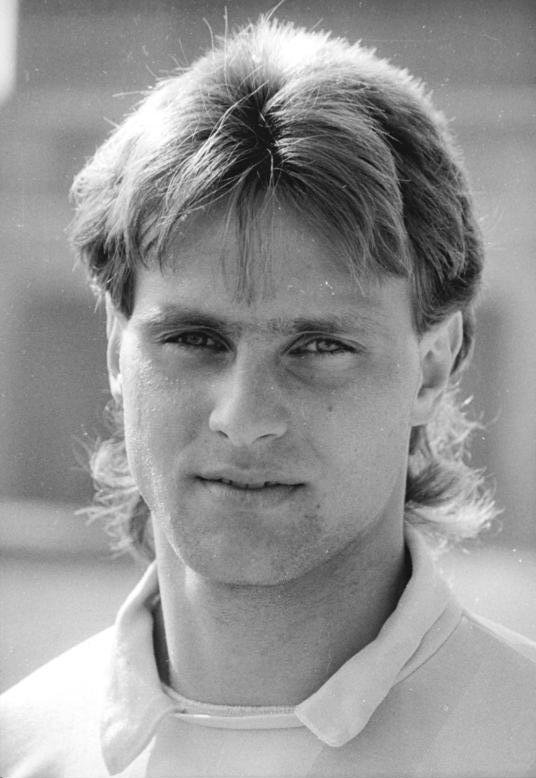
- Hiemann in 1990

Personal information
- Date of birth: 12 January 1968 (age 58)
- Place of birth: Karl-Marx-Stadt, East Germany
- Height: 1.87 m (6 ft 2 in)
- Position: Goalkeeper

Team information
- Current team: Chemnitzer FC (goalkeeper coach)

Senior career*
Years	Team	Apps	(Gls)
1986–1995	Chemnitzer FC	135	(0)
1995–1997	Hamburger SV	5	(0)
1997–2001	VfL Wolfsburg	6	(0)
2001–2004	Chemnitzer FC	64	(0)
Total		210	(0)

Managerial career
- 2010–: Chemnitzer FC (goalkeeper coach)
- * Club domestic league appearances and goals

Holger Hiemann (born 12 January 1968 in Karl-Marx-Stadt) is a retired German football player. He spent four seasons in the Bundesliga with Hamburger SV and VfL Wolfsburg.
