= Detlev Dammeier =

German footballer (born 1968)

Personal information
- Date of birth: 18 October 1968 (age 58)
- Place of birth: Stadthagen, West Germany
- Height: 1.82 m (6 ft 0 in)
- Position: Midfielder

Youth career
- SV Nordsehl

Senior career*
Years	Team	Apps	(Gls)
1986–1989	Hannover 96	78	(5)
1989–1992	Hamburger SV	51	(2)
1992–2000	VfL Wolfsburg	223	(22)
2000–2006	Arminia Bielefeld	168	(10)
Total		520	(39)

International career
1988–1989	West Germany U-21	8	(1)

Managerial career
- 2006–2007: Arminia Bielefeld U19 (assistant)
- 2007–2008: Arminia Bielefeld II
- 2007: Arminia Bielefeld (interim manager)
- 2008–2010: Arminia Bielefeld (athletic director)
- 2010: Arminia Bielefeld (interim manager)
- 2011–2013: Spvg. Steinhagen
- 2013–2014: RB Leipzig (scout)
- 2014: Preußen Münster (sports director)
Medal record
Men's football
Representing West Germany
FIFA U-16 World Championship
Runner-up	1985 China
- * Club domestic league appearances and goals

Detlev Dammeier (born 18 October 1968) is a German football coach and a former player who was the athletic director of Arminia Bielefeld from 20 March 2008 to 30 March 2010.

== Playing career ==
Dammeier was born in Stadthagen, in the Schaumburg Land. In 1986, he signed his first professional contract with Hannover 96. From 1989 to 1992 he played for the Hamburger SV and switched then to VfL Wolfsburg in the 2. Bundesliga. In 1997, Wolfsburg was promoted to the Bundesliga. In 2000, Dammeier joined Arminia Bielefeld in the 2. Bundesliga. With this club he was promoted both in 2002 and 2004 to the Bundesliga. He finally ended his active career at the end of the 2005–06 season.

Dammeier completed over 500 first and second division games. His position was defensive midfield.

== Post-playing career ==
From 10 November 2007, Dammeier coached Arminia Bielefeld's second team until the end of the season. Dammeier has successfully completed the 14-day training course for a Trainer-B-Lizenz for this job. On 10 December 2007, after the dismissal of Ernst Middendorp, he became interim coach of Arminia, which he only oversaw in the last first round game against VfB Stuttgart (2-0); after the game, Michael Frontzeck was introduced as the new head coach.

On 20 March 2008, Detlev Dammeier became Arminia Bielefeld's new sporting director, succeeding Reinhard Saftig, whom the club had previously fired. Dammeier signed a contract until the end of June 2009. He also held the post of coach of the second team of Arminia Bielefeld until the end of the season. During the winter break of the 2008–09 Bundesliga, the club announced that Detlev Dammeier's contract had been extended until 30 June 2011. On 30 March 2010, Arminia Bielefeld announced that Dammeier had been relieved of his duties.

From September 2011 to the summer of 2013, Dammeier coached the state league team Spvg Steinhagen. In the summer of 2013, Detlev Dammeier was a scout at RB Leipzig, where he was primarily responsible for analyzing opponents. On 17 February 2014, SC Preußen Münster announced that Dammeier would take over the sporting management of the club. After a controversial interview, Dammeier had to vacate the post on 31 March. From 1 July to 2 October 2017, Dammeier coached the club Lupo Martini Wolfsburg from the Oberliga Niedersachsen. For the 2018/19 season, Dammeier took over the coaching position at the Westfalenliga Delbrücker SC.

== Personal life ==
Detlev Dammeier is married and has three daughters. He completed an apprenticeship as a bank clerk. Since December 2009 he has been the official sponsor of the Bethel children's hospice.

== Honours ==
VfL Wolfsburg

- DFB-Pokal finalist: 1994–95

West Germany U16

- U-16 World Championship runner-up: 1985
