= Siegfried Reich =

German footballer

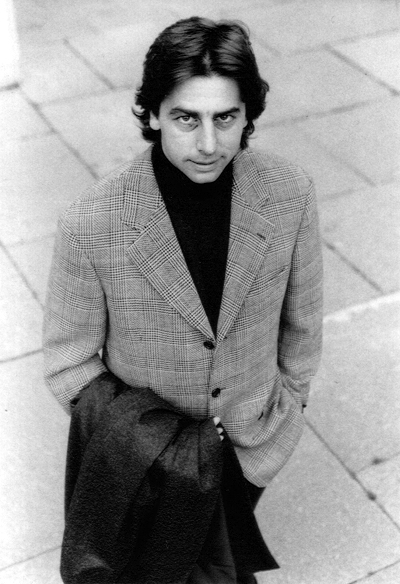

Personal information
- Date of birth: 29 September 1959 (age 67)
- Place of birth: Fallersleben, West Germany
- Height: 1.79 m (5 ft 10 in)
- Position: Striker

Senior career*
Years	Team	Apps	(Gls)
1978–1981	VfL Wolfsburg	78	(55)
1981–1983	Borussia Mönchengladbach	17	(8)
1983–1984	Borussia Dortmund	14	(2)
1984–1985	Arminia Bielefeld	33	(18)
1985–1989	Hannover 96	138	(68)
1989–1992	Bayer Uerdingen	24	(4)
1992–1996	VfL Wolfsburg	130	(59)
Total		434	(214)
- * Club domestic league appearances and goals

Siegfried Reich (born 29 September 1959) is a German former professional footballer who played as a striker.

The prolific goalscorer ended his career one year before Wolfsburg's first top flight promotion in 1997.

== Honours ==
- DFB-Pokal finalist: 1994–95
- 2. Bundesliga top scorer: 1987 (26 goals), 1993 (27 goals)
