= Dirk Anders =

German footballer

- Anders with BFC Dynamo at the Friedrich-Ludwig-Jahn-Sportpark in 1987

Personal information
- Date of birth: 26 September 1966 (age 60)
- Place of birth: East Berlin, East Germany
- Height: 1.86 m (6 ft 1 in)
- Position: Midfielder

Team information
- Current team: Bayern Munich (Scout)

Youth career
- –1984: Berliner FC Dynamo

Senior career*
Years	Team	Apps	(Gls)
1984–1989	Berliner FC Dynamo II	110	(57)
1986–1990	Berliner FC Dynamo	36	(7)
1991–1994	VfB Leipzig	127	(25)
1994–1996	1. FC Kaiserslautern	22	(1)
1996–1997	MSV Duisburg	19	(5)
1997–1999	Greuther Fürth	35	(0)
1999–2000	Vorwärts Steyr	16	(0)
2000–2001	VfR Mannheim	29	(5)
2001	Chemnitzer FC	6	(1)
2001–2004	Wormatia Worms	47	(7)
Total		447	(108)

Managerial career
- 2002–2004: Wormatia Worms
- 2004–2007: TSG Weinheim
- * Club domestic league appearances and goals

Dirk Anders (born 26 September 1966) is a German former professional footballer who played as a midfielder. Anders began playing football for the youth teams of football club BFC Dynamo. He made his debut for the first team of BFC Dynamo in the DDR-Oberliga at home against FC Karl-Marx-Stadt in the last matchday of the 1986-87 DDR-Oberliga on 6 June 1987. He currently works as a scout for Bayern Munich.
