= Peter Wynhoff =

German footballer and coach

Personal information
- Date of birth: 29 October 1968 (age 58)
- Place of birth: Berlin, Germany
- Height: 1.76 m (5 ft 9 in)
- Position: Midfielder

Senior career*
Years	Team	Apps	(Gls)
–1989	Reinickendorfer Füchse		
1989–1999	Borussia Mönchengladbach	240	(34)
1999–2000	Fortuna Köln	17	(0)
2000–2001	Rheydter SV	26	(11)
2001–2006	Borussia Mönchengladbach II	128	(43)

Managerial career
- 2006–2007: SC Kapellen-Erft
- 2007–2010: Borussia Mönchengladbach (youth coach)
- * Club domestic league appearances and goals

Peter Wynhoff (born 29 October 1968 in Berlin) is a German former professional footballer who played as a midfielder. He later became a coach.

== Honours ==
Borussia Mönchengladbach

- DFB-Pokal: 1995; runner-up 1992
