= Michael Klinkert =

German footballer

Personal information
- Date of birth: 7 July 1968 (age 58)
- Place of birth: Bous, West Germany
- Height: 1.82 m (6 ft 0 in)
- Position: Defender

Youth career
- 1975–1986: FSG 08/DJK Bous

Senior career*
Years	Team	Apps	(Gls)
1986–1987	1. FC Saarbrücken	3	(0)
1987–1989	Schalke 04	63	(9)
1989–2001	Borussia Mönchengladbach	281	(17)
Total		347	(26)

International career
1988–1990	West Germany U-21	12	(0)
Medal record
Representing West Germany
Men's football
FIFA World Youth Championship
Runner-up	1987 Chile
- * Club domestic league appearances and goals

Michael Klinkert (born 7 July 1968) is a German former professional footballer who played as a defender.

== Honours ==
Borussia Mönchengladbach

- DFB-Pokal: 1994–95; runner-up: 1991–92
