= 2000–01 1. FC Kaiserslautern season =

1. FC Kaiserslautern
2000–01 season
- Manager: Andreas Brehme
- Stadium: Fritz-Walter-Stadion
- Bundesliga: 8th
- DFB-Pokal: Second round
- DFB-Ligapokal: Semi-finals
- UEFA Cup: Semi-finals
- Top goalscorer: League: Miroslav Klose; Vratislav Lokvenc (9 each); All: Vratislav Lokvenc (12 goals)
- Average home league attendance: 39,246

During the 2000–01 German football season, 1. FC Kaiserslautern competed in the Bundesliga.

== Season summary ==
Although Kaiserlautern recorded the same number of points as they had the previous season, they finished in 8th, three places lower. Greater success came in the UEFA Cup, as Kaiserlautern reached the semi-finals before being eliminated by Deportivo Alavés.

== Players ==
=== First-team squad ===
Squad at end of season

Note: Flags indicate national team as defined under FIFA eligibility rules; some limited exceptions apply. Players may hold more than one non-FIFA nationality.

No.	Pos.	Nation	Player
1	GK	GER	Georg Koch
2	DF	DEN	Michael Schjønberg
3	DF	CZE	Petr Gabriel
4	DF	GER	Axel Roos
6	DF	EGY	Hany Ramzy
7	MF	BUL	Marian Hristov
8	MF	GRE	Dimitrios Grammozis (Note: Grammozis was born in Wuppertal, West Germany (now Germany), but also qualified to represent Greece internationally through his parents and represented them at U-21 level.)
9	FW	SWE	Jörgen Pettersson
10	FW	CZE	Vratislav Lokvenc
11	FW	GER	Olaf Marschall
12	MF	GER	Marco Reich
13	DF	YUG	Slobodan Komljenović (Note: Komljenović was born in Frankfurt, West Germany (now Germany), but also qualified to represent Yugoslavia internationally and made his international debut for Yugoslavia in December 1994.)
14	MF	FRA	Youri Djorkaeff
15	MF	CRO	Nenad Bjelica
16	GK	GER	Uwe Gospodarek

No.	Pos.	Nation	Player
17	MF	BRA	Ratinho
18	MF	POR	José Dominguez
20	DF	POL	Tomasz Kłos
21	DF	LUX	Jeff Strasser
22	MF	GER	Andreas Buck
23	MF	GER	Silvio Adzic
24	DF	GER	Harry Koch
25	FW	GER	Miroslav Klose (Note: Klose was born in Opole, Poland, but also qualified to represent Germany internationally and made his international debut for Germany in March 2001.)
26	GK	GER	Roman Weidenfeller
27	DF	GER	Marco Stark
28	FW	GER	Marco Toppmöller
29	DF	GER	Rainer Hauck
30	MF	GER	Mario Basler
31	MF	GER	Rüdiger Ziehl

=== Left club during season ===
Note: Flags indicate national team as defined under FIFA eligibility rules; some limited exceptions apply. Players may hold more than one non-FIFA nationality.

No. / Pos. / Nation / Player; 5 / DF / SUI / Murat Yakin (to FC Basel)	No. / Pos. / Nation / Player; 19 / FW / ALB / Igli Tare (to Brescia)

== Competitions ==
Win Draw Loss Postponed

=== Bundesliga ===
==== League table ====
Pos	Team	Pld	W	D	L	GF	GA	GD	Pts	Qualification or relegation
6	SC Freiburg	34	15	10	9	54	37	+17	55	Qualification to UEFA Cup first round
7	Werder Bremen	34	15	8	11	53	48	+5	53	Qualification to Intertoto Cup third round
8	1. FC Kaiserslautern	34	15	5	14	49	54	−5	50	
9	VfL Wolfsburg	34	12	11	11	60	45	+15	47	Qualification to Intertoto Cup third round
10	1. FC Köln	34	12	10	12	59	52	+7	46	

Source: www.dfb.de
Rules for classification: 1) points; 2) goal difference; 3) number of goals scored.

=== DFB-Pokal ===
==== First round ====
29 August 2000	Kickers Offenbach	0–4	1. FC Kaiserslautern	Offenbach
		Report (in German)	Ramzy 38'; Lokvenc 41'; Pettersson 53'; Basler 76'	Stadium: Stadion am Bieberer Berg; Attendance: 16,000; Referee: Herbert Fandel (Kyllburg)

==== Second round ====
1 November 2000	Borussia Mönchengladbach	5–1	1. FC Kaiserslautern	Mönchengladbach
	Nielsen 23'; Van Lent 43', 45'; Demo 84'; Auer 87'	Report (in German)	Pettersson 6'	Stadium: Bökelberg; Attendance: 24,100; Referee: Franz-Xaver Wack (Biberbach)

=== UEFA Cup ===
==== First round ====
11 September 2000	Bohemians (Republic of Ireland)	1–3	(Germany) Kaiserslautern	Tolka Park, Dublin
	Crowe 90' (pen.)	Report	Reich 72'; Hristov 76'; Tare 79'

21 September 2000	Kaiserslautern (Germany)	0–1	(Republic of Ireland) Bohemians	Fritz-Walter-Stadion, Kaiserslautern
		Report	Crowe 37'	Referee: Mikko Vuorela (Finland)

Kaiserslautern won 3–2 on aggregate.

==== Second round ====
24 October 2000	Iraklis (Greece)	1–3	(Germany) Kaiserslautern	Kaftanzoglio Stadium, Thessaloniki
	Konstantinou 47' (pen.)	Report UEFA Report	Basler 6'; Hristov 35'; Tavlaridis 64' (o.g.)	Attendance: 13,000; Referee: Alan Snoddy (Northern Ireland)

9 November 2000	Kaiserslautern (Germany)	2–3	(Greece) Iraklis	Fritz-Walter-Stadion, Kaiserslautern
	Koch 25' (pen.); Djorkaeff 29'	Report UEFA Report	Konstantinou 54', 90'; Ederson 90'	Attendance: 14,572; Referee: Mike Riley (England)

Kaiserslautern win 5-4 on aggregate

==== Third round ====
23 November 2000	Rangers (Scotland)	1–0	(Germany) Kaiserslautern	Ibrox Stadium, Glasgow
	Albertz 88'	Report UEFA Report		Attendance: 47,279; Referee: Gilles Veissière (France)

7 December 2000	Kaiserslautern (Germany)	3–0	(Scotland) Rangers	Fritz-Walter-Stadion, Kaiserslautern
	Klose 8'; Buck 65'; Lokvenc 79'	Report UEFA Report		Attendance: 28,757; Referee: Knud Erik Fisker (Denmark)

Kaiserslautern win 3–1 on aggregate.

==== Fourth round ====
15 February 2001	Slavia Prague (Czech Republic)	0–0	(Germany) Kaiserslautern	Strahov Stadium, Prague
		Report UEFA Report		Attendance: 17,840; Referee: Eric Romain (France)

22 February 2001	Kaiserslautern (Germany)	1–0	(Czech Republic) Slavia Prague	Fritz-Walter-Stadion, Kaiserslautern
	Lokvenc 59'	Report UEFA Report		Attendance: 23,596; Referee: Valentin Ivanov (Russia)

Kaiserslautern won 1–0 on aggregate.

==== Quarter-finals ====
8 March 2001	Kaiserslautern (Germany)	1–0	(Netherlands) PSV Eindhoven	Fritz-Walter-Stadion, Kaiserslautern
	Koch 31' (pen.)	Report UEFA Report		Attendance: 23,851; Referee: Graham Poll (England)

15 March 2001	PSV Eindhoven (Netherlands)	0–1	(Germany) Kaiserslautern	Philips Stadion, Eindhoven
	Bruggink (penalty missed); Van Bommel (red card) 73'	Report UEFA Report	Basler 71' (pen.)	Attendance: 31,000; Referee: Antonio Jesús López Nieto (Spain)

Match interrupted for 16 minutes due to supporter disturbances.
Kaiserslautern won 2–0 on aggregate

==== Semi-finals ====
5 April 2001	Alavés (Spain)	5–1	(Germany) Kaiserslautern	Mendizorrotza Stadium, Vitoria-Gasteiz
21:15	Contra 20' (pen.), 31' (pen.); Cruyff 42'; Alonso 57' (pen.); Mocelin 81'	Report UEFA Report	Koch 68' (pen.)	Attendance: 15,157; Referee: Rune Pedersen (Norway)

19 April 2001	1. FC Kaiserslautern (Germany)	1–4	(Spain) Alavés	Fritz-Walter-Stadion, Kaiserslautern
20:30	Djorkaeff 7'	Report UEFA Report	Alonso 23'; Vučko 64', 86'; Gañán 88'	Attendance: 29,800; Referee: Hugh Dallas (Scotland)

Alavés won 9–2 on aggregate.
