= 1999–2000 1. FC Kaiserslautern season =

1. FC Kaiserslautern
1999–2000 season
- Manager: Otto Rehhagel
- Bundesliga: 5th
- UEFA Cup: Third round
- DFB-Pokal: Third round
- Top goalscorer: Youri Djorkaeff (11)

In the 1999–2000 season, 1. FC Kaiserslautern competed in the Bundesliga.

== Season summary ==
Kaiserslautern repeated last season's fifth place finish. The club could have aimed higher were it not for their poor defensive record - only the bottom four teams conceded more than Kaiserslautern's 59. Tragedy struck at the end of the season, as young defender Thomas Lechner was killed in a motorcycle accident.

== Players ==
=== First-team squad ===
Squad at end of season

Note: Flags indicate national team as defined under FIFA eligibility rules; some limited exceptions apply. Players may hold more than one non-FIFA nationality.

No.	Pos.	Nation	Player
1	GK	GER	Andreas Reinke
2	DF	DEN	Michael Schjønberg
4	DF	GER	Axel Roos
5	DF	EGY	Samir Kamouna
6	DF	EGY	Hany Ramzy
7	MF	BUL	Marian Hristov
8	MF	GER	Martin Wagner
9	FW	SWE	Jörgen Pettersson
10	MF	SUI	Ciriaco Sforza
11	FW	GER	Olaf Marschall
12	MF	GER	Marco Reich
13	DF	YUG	Slobodan Komljenović (Note: Komljenović was born in Frankfurt, West Germany (now Germany), but also qualified to represent Yugoslavia internationally and made his international debut for Yugoslavia in December 1994.)
14	MF	FRA	Youri Djorkaeff
15	DF	HUN	János Hrutka

No.	Pos.	Nation	Player
16	GK	GER	Uwe Gospodarek
17	DF	BRA	Ratinho
18	GK	GER	Georg Koch
19	FW	ALB	Igli Tare
21	DF	LUX	Jeff Strasser
22	MF	GER	Andreas Buck
23	MF	GER	Silvio Adzic
24	DF	GER	Harry Koch
25	FW	GER	Miroslav Klose (Note: Klose was born in Opole, Poland, but was raised in Germany from the age of 8 and made his international debut for Germany in March 2001.)
26	GK	GER	Roman Weidenfeller
27	DF	GER	Marco Stark
28	MF	BRA	Júnior
29	DF	GER	Roger Lutz
30	MF	GER	Mario Basler

=== Left club during season ===
Note: Flags indicate national team as defined under FIFA eligibility rules; some limited exceptions apply. Players may hold more than one non-FIFA nationality.

No.	Pos.	Nation	Player
18	FW	GER	Jürgen Rische (to Wolfsburg)
20	MF	GER	Thomas Sobotzik (to Eintracht Frankfurt)

No.	Pos.	Nation	Player
20	DF	GER	Thomas Lechner (deceased)
25	GK	HUN	Lajos Szűcs (to Ferencváros)

== Competitions ==
Win Draw Loss Postponed

=== Bundesliga ===
==== League table ====
Pos	Team	Pld	W	D	L	GF	GA	GD	Pts	Qualification or relegation
3	Hamburger SV	34	16	11	7	63	39	+24	59	Qualification to Champions League third qualifying round
4	1860 Munich	34	14	11	9	55	48	+7	53	Qualification to Champions League third qualifying round
5	1. FC Kaiserslautern	34	15	5	14	54	59	−5	50	Qualification to UEFA Cup first round
6	Hertha BSC	34	13	11	10	39	46	−7	50	Qualification to UEFA Cup first round
7	VfL Wolfsburg	34	12	13	9	51	58	−7	49	Qualification to Intertoto Cup third round

Source: www.dfb.de
Rules for classification: 1) points; 2) goal difference; 3) number of goals scored.
