= 2002–03 1. FC Kaiserslautern season =

1. FC Kaiserslautern
2002–03 season
- Manager: Andreas Brehme; Karl-Heinz Emig; Eric Gerets
- Stadium: Fritz-Walter-Stadion
- Bundesliga: 14th
- DFB-Pokal: Runners-up
- UEFA Intertoto Cup: Third round
- Top goalscorer: Miroslav Klose (9)

During the 2002–03 German football season, 1. FC Kaiserslautern competed in the Bundesliga.

== Season summary ==
With Kaiserslautern in the relegation zone and eliminated from the Intertoto Cup, manager Andreas Brehme was sacked. After a brief caretaker spell under his assistant manager, Karl-Heinz Emig, former PSV Eindhoven manager Eric Gerets was recruited. Although the defense was improved, conceding only 3 goals more all season than in the championship season of 1998, the attacking record suffered and Kaiserslautern finished 14th, 4 points ahead of the relegation zone. However, the team did make a run to the final of the DFB-Pokal; despite a 3–1 defeat to double winners Bayern Munich, the team qualified again for the UEFA Cup.

== Players ==
=== First-team squad ===
Squad at end of season

Note: Flags indicate national team as defined under FIFA eligibility rules; some limited exceptions apply. Players may hold more than one non-FIFA nationality.

No.	Pos.	Nation	Player
1	GK	GER	Georg Koch
2	DF	COD	Nzelo Hervé Lembi
3	DF	CMR	Bill Tchato
4	DF	SVN	Aleksander Knavs
5	DF	GER	Thomas Hengen
6	DF	EGY	Hany Ramzy
7	MF	BUL	Marian Hristov
8	MF	GRE	Dimitrios Grammozis (Note: Grammozis was born in Wuppertal, West Germany (now Germany), but also qualified to represent Greece internationally through his parents and represented Greece at U-21 level.)
9	FW	CZE	Vratislav Lokvenc
10	MF	BRA	Lincoln
11	FW	GER	Miroslav Klose (Note: Klose was born in Opole, Poland, but was raised in Germany from the age of 8 and made his international debut for Germany in March 2001.)
12	GK	GER	Tim Wiese
13	MF	SUI	Ciriaco Sforza
14	MF	GER	Selim Teber
15	MF	CRO	Nenad Bjelica

No.	Pos.	Nation	Player
17	MF	BRA	Ratinho
18	MF	GER	Markus Anfang
20	DF	POL	Tomasz Kłos
21	FW	MLT	Michael Mifsud
22	FW	GER	Christian Timm
23	MF	GER	Thomas Riedl
24	DF	GER	Harry Koch
26	MF	GER	Torsten Reuter
27	MF	GER	Silvio Adzic
28	MF	GER	Stefan Malz
29	FW	GER	Danko Bošković
30	MF	GER	Mario Basler
31	GK	GER	Jens Kern
32	MF	POR	José Dominguez

=== Left club during season ===
Note: Flags indicate national team as defined under FIFA eligibility rules; some limited exceptions apply. Players may hold more than one non-FIFA nationality.

No.	Pos.	Nation	Player
3	DF	CZE	Petr Gabriel (on loan to Teplice)

== Competitions ==
Win Draw Loss Postponed

=== Bundesliga ===
==== League table ====
Pos	Team	Pld	W	D	L	GF	GA	GD	Pts	Qualification or relegation
12	Borussia Mönchengladbach	34	11	9	14	43	45	−2	42	
13	Hansa Rostock	34	11	8	15	35	41	−6	41	
14	1. FC Kaiserslautern	34	10	10	14	40	42	−2	40	Qualification to UEFA Cup first round
15	Bayer Leverkusen	34	11	7	16	47	56	−9	40	
16	Arminia Bielefeld (R)	34	8	12	14	35	46	−11	36	Relegation to 2. Bundesliga

Source: bundesliga.de
Rules for classification: 1) points; 2) goal difference; 3) number of goals scored.
(R) Relegated
