= 2003 DFB-Pokal final =

- Match programme cover
- Event: 2002–03 DFB-Pokal
Bayern Munich	1. FC Kaiserslautern
3	1
- Date: 31 May 2003
- Venue: Olympiastadion, Berlin
- Referee: Lutz Michael Fröhlich (Berlin)
- Attendance: 70,490
- Weather: Mostly cloudy 22 °C (72 °F); 83% humidity

The 2003 DFB-Pokal final decided the winner of the 2002–03 DFB-Pokal, the 60th season of Germany's premier knockout football cup competition. It was played on 31 May 2003 at the Olympiastadion in Berlin. Bayern Munich won the match 3–1 against 1. FC Kaiserslautern to claim their 11th cup title.

== Route to the final ==
The DFB-Pokal began with 64 teams in a single-elimination knockout cup competition. There were a total of five rounds leading up to the final. Teams were drawn against each other, and the winner after 90 minutes would advance. If still tied, 30 minutes of extra time was played. If the score was still level, a penalty shoot-out was used to determine the winner.

Note: In all results below, the score of the finalist is given first (H: home; A: away).

Bayern Munich		Round	1. FC Kaiserslautern
Opponent	Result	2002–03 DFB-Pokal	Opponent	Result
Werder Bremen Amateure (A)	3–0	Round 1	USC Paloma (A)	5–0
Hannover 96 (H)	2–1	Round 2	Energie Cottbus (A)	1–0
Schalke 04 (H)	0–0 (a.e.t.) (5–4 p)	Round of 16	SC Freiburg (H)	2–0
1. FC Köln (H)	8–0	Quarter-finals	VfL Bochum (A)	3–3 (a.e.t.) (4–3 p)
Bayer Leverkusen (H)	3–1	Semi-finals	Werder Bremen (H)	3–0

== Match ==
=== Details ===
31 May 2003
19:30 CEST

Bayern Munich	3–1	1. FC Kaiserslautern
Ballack 3', 10' (pen.); Pizarro 50'	Report	Klose 80'

Olympiastadion, Berlin
Attendance: 70,490
Referee: Lutz Michael Fröhlich (Berlin)

Bayern Munich	1. FC Kaiserslautern

GK	1	(Germany) Oliver Kahn (c)
RB	2	(France) Willy Sagnol
CB	25	(Germany) Thomas Linke
CB	4	(Ghana) Samuel Kuffour
LB	3	(France) Bixente Lizarazu		(substituted off) 84'
DM	16	(Germany) Jens Jeremies	(yellow card) 18'	(substituted off) 76'
RM	23	(England) Owen Hargreaves
CM	13	(Germany) Michael Ballack
LM	11	(Brazil) Zé Roberto		(substituted off) 76'
CF	9	(Brazil) Giovane Élber
CF	14	(Peru) Claudio Pizarro
Substitutes:
GK	22	(Germany) Bernd Dreher
DF	18	(Germany) Michael Tarnat		(substituted on) 84'
MF	7	(Germany) Mehmet Scholl		(substituted on) 76'
MF	8	(Croatia) Niko Kovač
MF	17	(Germany) Thorsten Fink		(substituted on) 76'
MF	21	(Germany) Markus Feulner
MF	31	(Germany) Bastian Schweinsteiger
Manager:
(Germany) Ottmar Hitzfeld

GK	12	(Germany) Tim Wiese
RB	24	(Germany) Harry Koch (c)	(yellow card) 44'	(substituted off) 46'
CB	20	(Poland) Tomasz Kłos
CB	2	(Democratic Republic of the Congo) Nzelo Hervé Lembi
LB	3	(Cameroon) Bill Tchato
DM	18	(Germany) Markus Anfang	(yellow card) 24'
CM	7	(Bulgaria) Marian Hristov	(red card) 78'
CM	10	(Brazil) Lincoln		(substituted off) 63'
RW	11	(Germany) Miroslav Klose	(yellow card) 61'
CF	9	(Czech Republic) Vratislav Lokvenc
LW	32	(Portugal) José Dominguez		(substituted off) 81'
Substitutes:
GK	1	(Germany) Georg Koch
DF	4	(Slovenia) Aleksander Knavs
MF	17	(Brazil) Ratinho
MF	23	(Germany) Thomas Riedl		(substituted on) 46'
MF	30	(Germany) Mario Basler
FW	14	(Germany) Selim Teber		(substituted on) 81'
FW	22	(Germany) Christian Timm		(substituted on) 63'
Manager:
(Belgium) Eric Gerets

Assistant referees:
Manuel Gräfe (Berlin)
Olaf Blumenstein (Berlin)
Fourth official:
Torsten Koop (Lüttenmark)

Match rules

- 90 minutes.
- 30 minutes of extra time if necessary.
- Penalty shoot-out if scores still level.
- Seven named substitutes, of which up to three may be used.
