= Marco Stark =

Marco Stark may refer to:

- Marco Stark (German footballer) (born 1981), German footballer for Wormatia Worms
- Marco Stark (Austrian footballer) (born 1993), Austrian footballer for SC Austria Lustenau
