= Igli Tare =

Albanian former footballer and sporting director (born 1973)

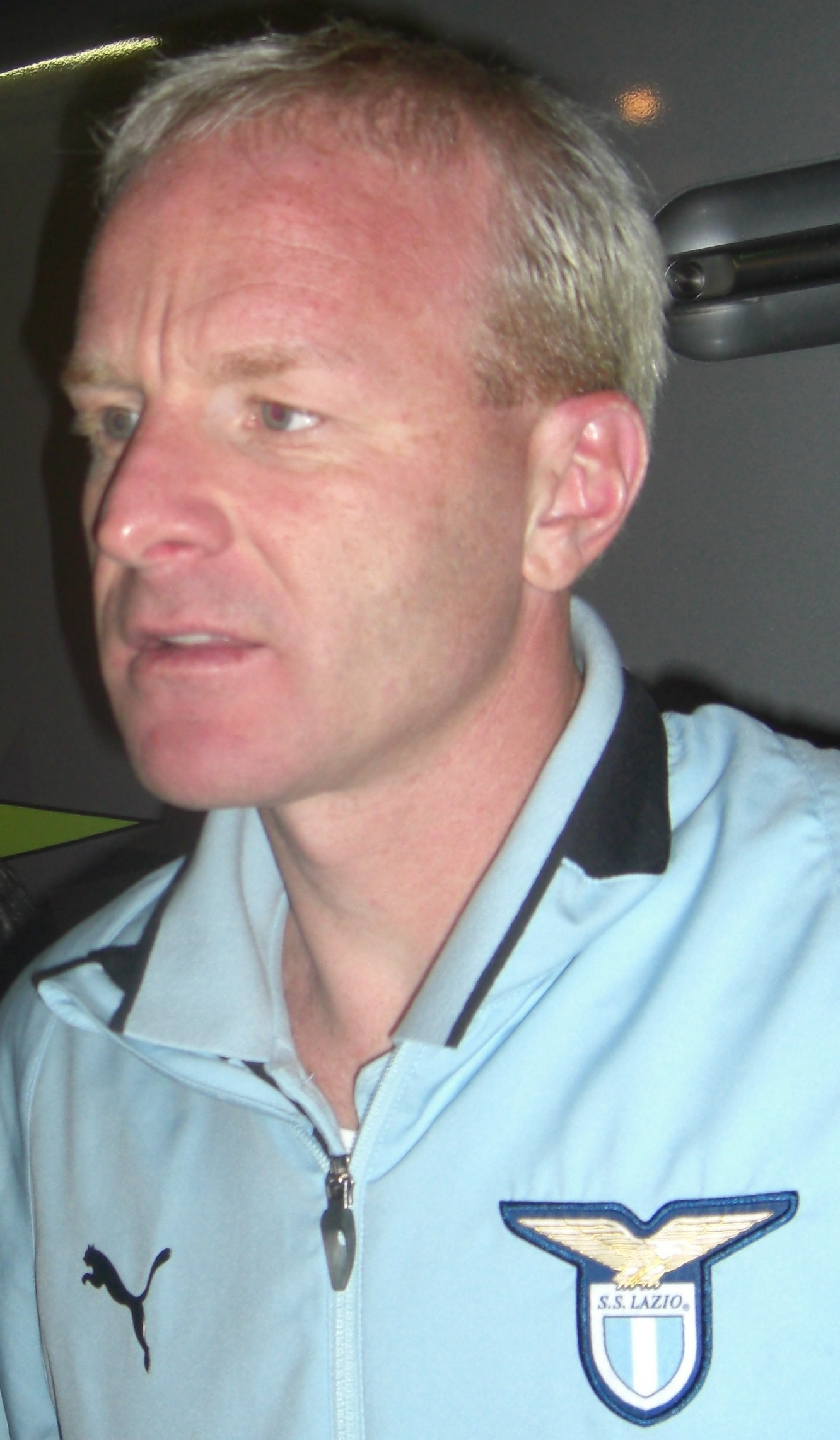
- Tare with Lazio in 2007

Personal information
- Date of birth: 25 July 1973 (age 53)
- Place of birth: Vlorë, PR Albania
- Height: 1.91 m (6 ft 3 in)
- Position: Forward

Youth career
- 1981–1982: Flamurtari Vlorë
- 1982–1991: Partizani Tirana

Senior career*
| Years | Team | Apps | (Gls) |
| 1988–1991 | Partizani Tirana | 14 | (2) |
| 1992–1993 | Südwest Ludwigshafen | 18 | (3) |
| 1993–1994 | VfR Mannheim | 9 | (1) |
| 1994–1995 | Waldhof Mannheim | 23 | (5) |
| 1995–1996 | Südwest Ludwigshafen | 21 | (5) |
| 1996–1997 | Karlsruher SC II | 23 | (4) |
| 1996–1997 | Karlsruher SC | 8 | (0) |
| 1997–1999 | Fortuna Düsseldorf | 63 | (24) |
| 1999–2001 | 1. FC Kaiserslautern | 26 | (4) |
| 2001–2003 | Brescia | 75 | (15) |
| 2003–2005 | Bologna | 55 | (11) |
| 2005–2008 | Lazio | 46 | (5) |
| Total | | 354 | (75) |

International career
| 1989 | Albania U18 | 2 | (0) |
| 1990 | Albania U21 | 2 | (0) |
| 1997–2007 | Albania | 68 | (10) |
- * Club domestic league appearances and goals

Igli Tare (Albanian pronunciation: [ˈiɡli ˈtaɾɛ]; born 25 July 1973) is an Albanian football executive and former professional footballer who played as a forward. He was most recently the sporting director of Serie A club Milan.

Tare spent most of his professional career in Germany and Italy. He began his senior career with Partizani Tirana before moving to Germany in 1994, where he played for VfR Mannheim, Südwest Ludwigshafen, Karlsruher SC, Fortuna Düsseldorf and 1. FC Kaiserslautern, making appearances in the Bundesliga and 2. Bundesliga. In 2001, he transferred to Italy, representing Brescia, Bologna and Lazio, competing in Serie A until his retirement in 2008.

At international level, Tare represented the Albania between 1997 and 2007, earning 68 caps and scoring 10 goals. He captained the national team in several matches, becoming one of Albania’s most capped players of his generation.

After retiring, Tare became a football executive. He served as sporting director of Lazio from 2008 to 2023.

== Early life ==
Tare joined Partizani Tirana at age 9 in 1982 and made his senior debut as a 15-year-old in 1988. He made 14 appearances and scored 2 goals during the first half of the 1991–92 Albanian National Championship season.

After his top-flight experience with Partizani, Tare left Albania in early 1992, traveling first to Greece and then to Germany to pursue professional football opportunities. In Germany, he applied for political asylum and worked as a gardener.

Tare continued his career with Südwest Ludwigshafen in the third-tier Oberliga Südwest, making 18 appearances and scoring 3 goals in the 1992–93 Oberliga Südwest season. He then played for VfR Mannheim, recording 9 appearances and 1 goal in the 1993–94 Oberliga Baden-Württemberg. In 1994, he joined Waldhof Mannheim, making 23 appearances and scoring 5 goals in the 1994–95 Oberliga Südwest season. In 1995, Tare returned to Südwest Ludwigshafen for the 1995–96 Oberliga Südwest season, making 21 appearances and scoring 5 goals.

== Club career ==
=== Karlsruher ===
In 1996, Tare joined Bundesliga club Karlsruher SC, initially playing for the club's reserve team. He made his Bundesliga debut on 17 September 1996 in a 0–2 loss against VfB Stuttgart on matchday 2 of the 1996–97 Bundesliga season, coming on as a substitute for the final 15 minutes. As part of the reserves, he played regularly in the 1996–97 Regionalliga, making 23 appearances and scoring four goals as Karlsruher SC II narrowly avoided relegation to the fourth tier. During the 1996–97 DFB-Pokal, Tare featured for both the reserve side and the first team, making three consecutive starts in the first three rounds with the reserves, including a full 90 minutes and a full 120 minutes, and subsequently featuring once for the senior team in the semi-finals of the competition, coming on as a substitute and playing 31 minutes against Energie Cottbus in a 3–0 defeat. Tare went on to make several further appearances in the Bundesliga during the second half of the season, mostly as a substitute, totalling eight league matches.

=== Fortuna Düsseldorf ===
In 1997, he signed for Fortuna Düsseldorf in the 2. Bundesliga, scoring 24 goals in 63 league appearances across two seasons. He made his debut on 25 July 1997 in the opening matchday of the 1997–98 2. Bundesliga season against Eintracht Frankfurt, coming on as a substitute for the final six minutes in a 3–2 loss. After initially appearing as a substitute in the first five matches of the season, Tare soon established himself as a regular starter, going on to feature in every remaining league match of the campaign and frequently playing the full 90 minutes. He scored his first goal on 31 August 1997 against SpVgg Greuther Fürth on matchday 5, coming on as a substitute in the 70th minute and scoring the equaliser in the 90th minute in a 2–2 draw. On 4 October 1997, Tare played the full 90 minutes and scored his first brace against Fortuna Köln on matchday 9 in a 3–0 away win, scoring in the 72nd and 81st minutes.

On 23 November 1997, Tare scored the winning goal in a 1–0 away victory against 1. FC Nürnberg. On 1 March 1998, Tare scored twice against SV Meppen in a 4–3 win. On 15 May 1998, he again scored the winning goal against 1. FC Nürnberg for the second time that season, netting in the 84th minute in a 2–1 victory. On 7 June 1998, on the final matchday of the league season against Carl Zeiss Jena, Tare scored in the 47th minute as Fortuna Düsseldorf came from 3–0 down to win 4–3 away. During the whole season, Tare scored 13 league goals as Fortuna Düsseldorf finished 7th in the table.

On 9 August 1998, Tare scored his first goal of the 1998–99 2. Bundesliga season in the 5th minute in a 3–1 win against FC Gütersloh. He scored again in the following match against Uerdingen 05 four days later, netting the equaliser in the 76th minute in a 2–2 draw. In the 1998–99 DFB-Pokal, Tare scored a brace in a 7–4 first-round win against SV Straelen and netted the winning goal in a 2–1 victory over 1860 Munich in the second round to send Fortuna Düsseldorf into the round of 16, where they were eliminated by Werder Bremen. On 9 September 1998, Tare scored twice against TeBe Berlin in a 2–2 draw. On 27 November 1998, Tare scored the winning goal in a 1–0 away victory against Energie Cottbus. By the end of the first half of the season, Tare had scored 10 league goals, including three penalties. During the second half of the season, he added one further league goal, taking his tally to 11 league goals in 29 appearances as Fortuna Düsseldorf finished bottom of the table and were relegated to the Regionalliga.

=== Kaiserslautern ===
After Fortuna were relegated to the third tier, Tare returned to the Bundesliga in summer 1999 by joining 1. FC Kaiserslautern. He made his debut on 10 July 1999 in the 1999 DFB‑Ligapokal preliminary round against Bayer Leverkusen, coming on as a half‑time substitute in a 3–1 loss that resulted in elimination from the competition. He faced strong competition in attack from players such as Olaf Marschall, Youri Djorkaeff, and the emerging Miroslav Klose. He made his Bundesliga debut on 14 August 1999 against Borussia Dortmund in the opening matchday of the 1999–2000 Bundesliga season, coming on as a substitute for the final two minutes in a 1–0 win. On 4 November 1999, Tare made his European competition debut in the 1999–2000 UEFA Cup second-round match against Tottenham Hotspur, coming on as an 83rd-minute substitute for Michael Schjønberg as his side scored twice in the 90th minute to secure a 2–0 victory. He scored his first goal in his 17th league appearance on 8 April 2000 on matchday 28 against Schalke 04 in a 2–1 away win, starting the match, playing 86 minutes and scoring the opening goal in the 5th minute. Later that month, Tare played the full 90 minutes and scored a hat-trick against Ulm 1846 in a 6–2 win. In total, he made 22 Bundesliga appearances, often as a substitute, and scored four goals.

In the following season, he fell further down the pecking order. He started the season by scoring in the 1999 DFB‑Ligapokal preliminary round on 27 July 2000 against 1860 Munich, netting in the eighth minute to open the scoring in a 2–0 win. In the next round, Tare played the full 90 minutes against Bayern Munich on 30 July 2000 as Kaiserslautern were defeated 4–1 in the semi-final. On 11 September 2000, Tare scored his first European goal in the 2000–01 UEFA Cup first-round match against Bohemians, netting in the 79th minute after coming on as a substitute in a 3–1 away victory. During the first months of the 2000–01 Bundesliga season, Tare made four appearances, including one start, before moving to Italy during the winter transfer window.

=== Brescia ===
In January 2001, Tare joined Serie A club Brescia, managed by Carlo Mazzone. He made his Serie A debut on 28 January 2001 in a 1–1 draw against Milan, coming on as an 84th-minute substitute for Andrea Pirlo. The following week, he scored his first Serie A goal, opening the scoring in the 37th minute in a 3–1 away win against Bari. After missing two matches shortly after his arrival, Tare featured regularly for Brescia for the remainder of the 2000–01 Serie A season, alternating between substitute appearances and occasional starts, mainly serving as a backup to Dario Hübner in attack while partnering regularly with Roberto Baggio. On 8 April 2001, he played the full match against Reggina and scored his second Serie A goal in a 4–0 win. On 17 June 2001, in the final matchday of the Serie A season, Tare played the full 90 minutes against Bari and scored twice, helping Brescia come from behind to win 3–1. Tare finished the season with a total of 17 appearances and four goals. Brescia finished eighth in the league.

At the start of the following season, on 1 August 2001, Tare scored in a 2–2 draw against Chmel Blšany in the semi-finals of the 2001 UEFA Intertoto Cup, with Brescia advancing to the final 4–3 on aggregate. In the two-legged final, Tare appeared in both matches against Paris Saint-Germain, including 23 minutes as a substitute in the first leg on 7 August 2001 in a 0–0 draw and playing the full match in the second leg a week later in a 1–1 draw, with the French side winning the tie on away goals.

Following the departure of Dario Hübner, Tare established himself as a regular starter for Brescia in the 2001–02 Serie A season, appearing in every league match during the 2001 calendar year, including six consecutive full matches at the start. He started the league season on 26 August 2001 by scoring twice in the first half against Milan, although the visitors equalised in the second half for a 2–2 draw. The following week, on 9 September 2001, he scored another brace in a 3–1 away win against Torino. Despite his prolific start to the season, Tare did not score again in the league until 9 December 2001, when he scored in a 3–1 home defeat against Inter in the 14th round of the league. During the second half of the season in 2002, Tare lost his regular starting place, falling behind Luca Toni in the attacking hierarchy, making only nine appearances in 18 league rounds, including three starts, failing to score any goals. Brescia finished 13th in the league with 40 points, narrowly avoiding relegation.

In the 2001–02 Coppa Italia round of 16 second leg on 28 November 2001, Tare scored the only goal in a 1–0 win after extra time against Como, playing the full 120 minutes as Brescia advanced 6–5 on penalties. Overall, Tare made five appearances during the campaign, featuring in both legs of the semi-finals against Parma as Brescia were eliminated 3–2 on aggregate.

Ahead of the 2002–03 Serie A season, Luca Toni sustained an injury during pre-season, missing several months after undergoing knee ligament surgery, allowing Tare to return as a regular starter alongside Roberto Baggio, starting all matches of the first half of the campaign and playing the majority of available minutes, during which he scored five goals. He scored his first goal of the season on 22 September 2002 on matchday 3 in a 2–1 away win against Chievo Verona. On 2 November 2002, Tare scored the opening goal in a 2–0 away win against Torino on matchday eight. On 8 December 2002, on matchday 13, Tare scored in a 2–0 home win against Juventus, the eventual champions. The following week, Tare followed up with a brace in a 3–1 home win against Perugia.

In the second half of the season, following Luca Toni's return from injury, Tare was relegated to the bench and mainly used as a substitute, featuring regularly during the campaign and making 16 appearances, including only three starts, mostly in the final weeks, as he was primarily deployed as a substitute for Toni and occasionally as an additional attacking option alongside Roberto Baggio and Toni. On 1 February 2003, Tare came on as an 82nd-minute substitute for Luca Toni and scored four minutes later to seal a 4–1 away win against Piacenza on matchday 19. Tare finished the Serie A season with 33 appearances and six goals, with Brescia securing ninth place in the league and qualifying for the Intertoto Cup second round.

Tare left Brescia after two and a half seasons, scoring 15 league goals in 75 appearances.

=== Bologna ===
He joined fellow Serie A side Bologna in 2003, reuniting with coach Mazzone. He spent two seasons at the club, scoring 11 league goals in 55 appearances. During the first half of the 2003–04 Serie A season, Tare was part of a four-man attacking rotation alongside Giuseppe Signori, Claudio Bellucci and Fausto Rossini, mostly used as a substitute, although he made six starts and several second-half appearances, including at half-time. He made his debut on 28 September 2003 against Modena on matchday 4, coming on as a substitute for 33 minutes in a 2–0 loss. He scored his first goal on 29 October 2003 in the 2003–04 Coppa Italia second round against Brindisi, coming on as a substitute for 25 minutes in a 3–0 win. He scored his first Serie A goal on 11 January 2004 against Lecce on matchday 16, netting the winning goal in the 76th minute after coming on as a substitute in a 2–1 away loss. He scored in the following match a week later against Chievo Verona, netting in the first half of a 3–1 win.

In the second half of the league season, Tare established himself as a regular starter, starting nearly every match and often completing the full 90 minutes, while scoring four more league goals. He scored in the first half against his former club Brescia on 21 March 2004 on matchday 26 in a 3–0 win. He scored in the following match against Roma, netting the decisive goal in the 78th minute of a 2–1 away win. He scored his final goal of the season in the penultimate match against Lecce, netting in the first half of a 1–1 draw after the hosts equalised late, as Bologna eventually secured 12th place to avoid relegation.

He scored his first league goal of the 2004–05 Serie A season on 14 November 2004 against Lazio on matchday 12, netting the equaliser in a 2–1 away loss, before being sent off in stoppage time for reciprocal misconduct following an altercation with Paolo Di Canio, with both players receiving red cards. He scored his second goal on 6 January 2005 against his former club Brescia on matchday 17, opening the scoring in the 17th minute of a 1–1 away draw. He scored again three days later against Chievo Verona in a 3–1 win. He scored the equalising goal on 13 February 2005 against Palermo on matchday 24 in a 1–1 draw. He scored his fifth and final goal of the season on 6 March 2005 against Udinese on matchday 27, netting the winning goal in the 4th minute of a 1–0 away victory. At the end of the season, Bologna finished level on 42 points with Parma and Fiorentina, but due to the head-to-head results among the three teams, Bologna and Parma were placed in the relegation play-off, while Fiorentina avoided it. Tare scored in the first leg of the relegation play-off against Parma on 14 June 2005, netting the only goal in a 1–0 away win, although Bologna lost the return leg 2–0 and were relegated to Serie B.

=== Lazio ===
After Bologna's relegation, Tare was signed by Lazio on a three-year contract reportedly worth €600,000 per year. Under manager Delio Rossi, Tare was primarily a rotation player in attack alongside Tommaso Rocchi, Paolo Di Canio, and the young Goran Pandev, making 22 appearances during the 2005–06 Serie A season, mostly as a substitute, though he also started several matches and played the full 90 minutes on multiple occasions. He made his debut on 27 July 2005 in the 2005 UEFA Intertoto Cup semi-finals first leg against Olympique de Marseille, coming on as a substitute in the 70th minute for Paolo Di Canio in a 1–1 draw. He made his Serie A debut on 26 October 2005 against Chievo Verona, coming on as a substitute in the 78th minute for César in a 2–2 draw. He scored his first goal for Lazio on 27 November 2005 in a 3–2 away win against Empoli, netting in the 78th minute to help the team come from 2–1 down. He scored again the following week on 4 December 2005 against Siena, playing the full 90 minutes and scoring in the 84th minute of a 3–2 win. He scored his first goal of 2006 on 8 January in a 4–1 win against Ascoli, coming on as a substitute in the 24th minute. Lazio finished 6th in the league, qualifying for European competition, but were initially relegated to Serie B as part of the Calciopoli sanctions; after appeal, their relegation was overturned, and they remained in Serie A, beginning the next season with an 11‑point deduction. Tare also made four appearances in the 2005–06 Coppa Italia, playing 10 minutes in a 2–0 win against Cittadella and the full 90 minutes in the remaining three matches, including a 0–0 draw in the return leg and two quarter-final matches against Inter (1–1 draw and 1–0 loss), as Lazio were eliminated 2–1 on aggregate.

In the 2006–07 season, following the arrival of Stephen Makinwa, Tare had reduced playing time, making only 13 appearances in the 2006–07 Serie A season and starting the full 90 minutes in just one match. During the 2007–08 season, Tare was a backup striker behind Rocchi–Pandev and was not the primary substitute, with Makinwa preferred in the first half of the season and later Rolando Bianchi on loan from January, limiting his playing time. He made 26 appearances across all competitions, 20 as a substitute, the highest number of substitute appearances in the squad that season. Tare made his UEFA Champions League debut on 28 August 2007, coming on as an 89th-minute substitute for Goran Pandev in a 3–1 away win against Dinamo București in the third qualifying round second leg as Lazio advanced to the group stage with a 4–2 aggregate victory. He made his only group stage appearance on 24 October 2007, coming on as a substitute for the final nine minutes in the Group C match against Werder Bremen, which Lazio lost 2–1. During the 2007–08 Serie A season, Tare began with limited playing time, making only six brief appearances in the first half, and after Makinwa left he saw increased playing time, featuring in two consecutive matches of over half a game each; following Bianchi’s arrival, his minutes decreased again to mostly short substitute appearances, although he finished the season with three starts and full 90-minute appearances due to absences among other forwards. On 23 December 2007, he played 36 minutes away against Palermo on matchday 17 and scored in the 80th minute to secure a 2–2 draw for Lazio, who were reduced to nine men. Lazio finished 12th in the league, missing out on qualification for UEFA competitions. Across the 2007–08 Coppa Italia campaign, Tare made six appearances and scored once, featuring regularly during Lazio’s progression to the semi-finals. In the Round of 16 tie against Napoli, he played the full 90 minutes in both legs, contributing directly with a goal in the second leg as Lazio advanced 3–2 on aggregate. In the subsequent quarter-final and semi-final rounds, he was mainly used as a substitute, making brief appearances. At the end of the season, he retired from professional football at the age of 34.

== International career ==
Tare represented Albania at youth level, including appearances for the U18 and U21 teams between 1989 and 1990. He was later capped 68 times for the Albania senior team between 1997 and 2007, scoring 10 goals. He regularly served as captain during his final two years with the national team.

Tare made his senior debut on 2 April 1997 in the 1998 FIFA World Cup qualifying matchday 5 against the reigning European champions, Germany, played in Granada, Spain, due to the 1997 Albanian civil unrest, starting under Astrit Hafizi in attack in a 3–2 defeat. On 11 October 1997, in another qualifier against Germany in Hannover, he scored his first international goal on his sixth match for the national team in a 4–3 defeat. Tare played six matches in this qualifying campaign, as Albania finished last with four points.

During the UEFA Euro 2000 qualifying, Tare became a regular alongside Altin Lala and Erjon Bogdani, supported by experienced teammates such as Rudi Vata, Foto Strakosha, and Altin Rraklli. On 14 October 1998, he scored in Albania’s second Group 2 match against Norway, which finished 2–2. On 5 June 1999, he scored again in the return fixture against Norway in a 2–1 home defeat. Albania concluded the campaign with four draws and a 2–1 home victory over Georgia, finishing second from bottom — the first time Albania avoided last place in a European Championship qualifying campaign.

On 27 March 2002, Tare scored the only goal in a 1–0 friendly victory for Albania against Azerbaijan in Tirana. On 29 March 2003, he scored with a header in a UEFA Euro 2004 qualifying match against Russia, as Albania won 3–1 in coach Hans-Peter Briegel's first match. On 10 September 2003, he scored in a 3–1 victory over Georgia, helping Albania finish their campaign unbeaten at home. On 11 October 2003, he scored in a friendly against Portugal in Lisbon, giving Albania a 2–1 lead at half-time; the match ended in a 5–3 defeat. On 31 March 2004, Tare earned his 50th international cap in a friendly match against Iceland, which ended in a 2–1 victory.

On 4 June 2005, Tare scored twice in a 2006 FIFA World Cup qualifying match against Georgia, which ended in a 3–2 win. He captained the national team for the first time on 26 March 2005 in another qualifier against Turkey, which ended in a 2–0 defeat. In the qualifying campaign, Albania finished third from bottom in the group for the first time in its history and set a new record of 13 points.

On 16 August 2006, he scored his tenth and final international goal in a 3–0 friendly win over San Marino. On 7 February 2007, he earned his 68th and final cap against Macedonia in a 1–0 defeat. A month later, he was omitted from the squad by coach Otto Barić due to a lack of match practice, and was not called up again, ending his international career.

== Post-playing career ==
Tare's Lazio contract expired at the end of the 2007–08 season. He then accepted a non-playing role at Lazio, becoming the club's team manager. In April 2009 he completed a course in order to receive his qualification to be sporting director, a post he held at Lazio until 5 June 2023. On 26 May 2025, Tare was appointed as the sporting director of AC Milan. A year later on 25 May, Tare was dismissed by AC Milan following the club's failure to qualify for the 2026-27 UEFA Champions League.

== Style of play ==
A tall, physical, and combative forward, Tare usually played as a centre-forward or as a striker, and was mainly known for his ability in the air, as well as his work-rate, professionalism, solid technique, and capacity to link up with teammates, despite not being a significantly elegant or prolific player.

== Personal life ==
His father Isa also played for Partizani Tirana and later served as a club director. He is one of three brothers, along with Auron, a journalist and historian, while another brother, Agron (also referred to as "Genti"), has served as Consul General of Albania in Istanbul and later as director of the Port of Durrës. He studied at the Qemal Stafa High School in Tirana, Albania. He has two sons, Etienne (born 2003), a professional footballer who started as a youth at Lazio, and Liam.

Tare has publicly expressed support for Albanian national causes. During the Kosovo War, he expressed support for the Kosovo Liberation Army and assisted Albanian refugees displaced by the conflict with financial help and accommodation in Albania.

An incident involving Tare occurred during the 2005–06 Serie A match between Inter and Lazio, when tensions escalated between him and Siniša Mihajlović. Tare stated that Mihajlović had provoked him throughout the first half, leading to a confrontation during the interval, an episode he later said he did not regret. Their rivalry resurfaced in 2016, when Lazio president Claudio Lotito considered appointing Mihajlović as head coach. Despite ongoing discussions and Lotito’s long-standing friendship with Mihajlović, Tare reportedly opposed the appointment and ultimately played a role in preventing the move.

== Career statistics ==
=== Club ===
Appearances and goals by club, season and competition
| Club | Season | League | | | Cup (Note: Includes Albanian Cup, DFB-Pokal, DFB-Ligapokal and Coppa Italia) | | Europe | | Other | | Total | |
| Club | Season | Division | Apps | Goals | Apps | Goals | Apps | Goals | Apps | Goals | Apps | Goals |
|---|---|---|---|---|---|---|---|---|---|---|---|---|
| Partizani Tirana | 1991–92 | Albanian Superliga | 14 | 2 | | | — | | — | | 14 | 2 |
| Südwest Ludwigshafen | 1992–93 | Oberliga Südwest (Rheinland-Pfalz/Saar) | 18 | 3 | — | | — | | — | | 18 | 3 |
| VfR Mannheim | 1993–94 | Oberliga Südwest (Baden-Württemberg) | 9 | 1 | — | | — | | — | | 9 | 1 |
| Waldhof Mannheim | 1994–95 | Oberliga Südwest (Rheinland-Pfalz/Saar) | 23 | 5 | — | | — | | — | | 23 | 5 |
| Südwest Ludwigshafen | 1995–96 | Oberliga Südwest (Rheinland-Pfalz/Saar) | 21 | 5 | — | | — | | — | | 21 | 5 |
| Karlsruher SC II | 1996–97 | Regionalliga Süd | 23 | 4 | — | | — | | — | | 23 | 4 |
| Karlsruher SC | 1996–97 | Bundesliga | 8 | 0 | 4 | 0 | — | | — | | 12 | 0 |
| Fortuna Düsseldorf | 1997–98 | 2. Bundesliga | 34 | 13 | — | | — | | — | | 34 | 13 |
| Fortuna Düsseldorf | 1998–99 | 2. Bundesliga | 29 | 11 | 3 | 3 | — | | — | | 32 | 14 |
| Fortuna Düsseldorf | Total | | 63 | 24 | 3 | 3 | — | | — | | 66 | 27 |
| 1. FC Kaiserslautern | 1999–2000 | Bundesliga | 22 | 4 | 1 | 0 | 2 (Note: Appearances in UEFA Cup) | 0 | — | | 25 | 4 |
| 1. FC Kaiserslautern | 2000–01 | Bundesliga | 4 | 0 | 4 | 1 | 2 | 1 | — | | 10 | 2 |
| 1. FC Kaiserslautern | Total | | 26 | 4 | 5 | 1 | 4 | 1 | — | | 35 | 6 |
| Brescia | 2000–01 | Serie A | 17 | 4 | — | | — | | — | | 17 | 4 |
| Brescia | 2001–02 | Serie A | 25 | 5 | 5 | 1 | 3 (Note: Appearances in UEFA Intertoto Cup) | 1 | — | | 33 | 7 |
| Brescia | 2002–03 | Serie A | 33 | 6 | 1 | 0 | 2 | 0 | — | | 36 | 6 |
| Brescia | Total | | 75 | 15 | 6 | 1 | 5 | 1 | — | | 86 | 17 |
| Bologna | 2003–04 | Serie A | 29 | 6 | 3 | 1 | — | | — | | 32 | 7 |
| Bologna | 2004–05 | Serie A | 26 | 5 | 2 | 0 | — | | 2 (Note: Appearances and goals in Serie A relegation play-offs) | 1 | 30 | 6 |
| Bologna | Total | | 55 | 11 | 5 | 1 | — | | 2 | 1 | 62 | 13 |
| Lazio | 2005–06 | Serie A | 22 | 3 | 4 | 0 | 2 | 0 | — | | 28 | 3 |
| Lazio | 2006–07 | Serie A | 14 | 0 | 3 | 0 | — | | — | | 17 | 0 |
| Lazio | 2007–08 | Serie A | 18 | 1 | 6 | 1 | 2 (Note: Appearances in UEFA Champions League) | 0 | — | | 26 | 2 |
| Lazio | Total | | 54 | 4 | 13 | 1 | 4 | 0 | — | | 71 | 5 |
| Career total | | | 389 | 78 | 36 | 7 | 13 | 2 | 2 | 1 | 440 | 88 |

=== International ===
Appearances and goals by national team and year
| National team | Year | Apps | Goals |
|---|---|---|---|
| Albania | 1997 | 6 | 2 |
| Albania | 1998 | 8 | 0 |
| Albania | 1999 | 8 | 2 |
| Albania | 2000 | 5 | 0 |
| Albania | 2001 | 6 | 1 |
| Albania | 2002 | 5 | 2 |
| Albania | 2003 | 10 | 2 |
| Albania | 2004 | 7 | 0 |
| Albania | 2005 | 7 | 0 |
| Albania | 2006 | 5 | 1 |
| Albania | 2007 | 1 | 0 |
| Total | | 68 | 10 |

Scores and results list Albania's goal tally first, score column indicates score after each Tare goal.

List of international goals scored by Igli Tare
| No. | Date | Venue | Opponent | Score | Result | Competition |
|---|---|---|---|---|---|---|
| 1 | 11 October 1997 | Niedersachsenstadion, Hanover, Germany | Germany | 2–2 | 3–4 | 1998 FIFA World Cup qualification |
| 2 | 14 October 1998 | Ullevaal Stadion, Oslo, Norway | Norway | 2–2 | 2–2 | UEFA Euro 2000 qualifying |
| 3 | 5 June 1999 | Qemal Stafa Stadium, Tirana, Albania | Norway | 1–1 | 1–2 | UEFA Euro 2000 qualifying |
| 4 | 27 March 2002 | Qemal Stafa Stadium, Tirana, Albania | Azerbaijan | 1-0 | 1-0 | Friendly |
| 5 | 29 March 2003 | Loro Boriçi Stadium, Shkodër, Albania | Russia | 3–1 | 3–1 | UEFA Euro 2004 qualifying |
| 6 | 10 September 2003 | Qemal Stafa Stadium, Tirana, Albania | Georgia | 2–0 | 3–1 | UEFA Euro 2004 qualifying |
| 7 | 11 October 2003 | Restelo, Lisbon, Portugal | Portugal | 2–1 | 3–5 | Friendly |
| 8 | 4 June 2005 | Qemal Stafa Stadium, Tirana, Albania | Georgia | 1–0 | 3–2 | 2006 FIFA World Cup qualification |
| 9 | 4 June 2005 | Qemal Stafa Stadium, Tirana, Albania | Georgia | 3–0 | 3–2 | 2006 FIFA World Cup qualification |
| 10 | 16 August 2006 | Stadio Olimpico, Serravalle, San Marino | San Marino | 1–0 | 3–0 | Friendly |

== Honours ==
Individual

- Career Award: 2018
- Supreme Order of the Eagle: 2025
