= Miroslav Klose =

German football player and manager (born 1978)

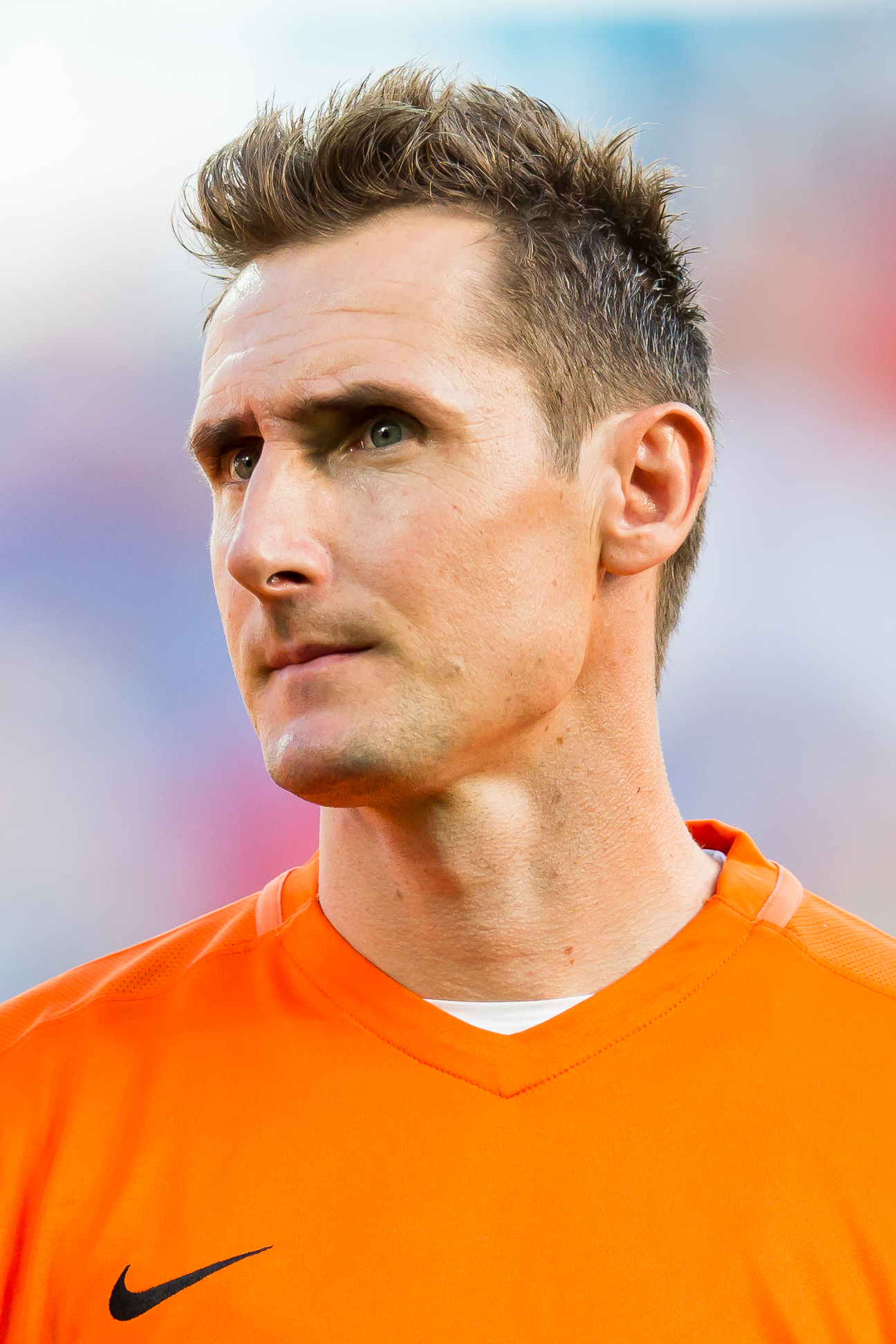
- Klose in 2016

Personal information
- Full name: Miroslav Josef Klose
- Birth name: Mirosław Marian Klose
- Date of birth: 9 June 1978 (age 48)
- Place of birth: Opole, Poland
- Height: 1.84 m (6 ft 0 in)
- Position: Striker

Team information
- Current team: 1. FC Nürnberg (manager)

Youth career
- 1987–1998: SG Blaubach-Diedelkopf

Senior career*
Years	Team	Apps	(Gls)
1998–1999	FC 08 Homburg	18	(1)
1999–2004	1. FC Kaiserslautern	120	(44)
2004–2007	Werder Bremen	89	(53)
2007–2011	Bayern Munich	98	(24)
2011–2016	Lazio	139	(54)
Total		464	(176)

International career
2001–2014	Germany	137	(71)

Managerial career
- 2022–2023: Rheindorf Altach
- 2024–: 1. FC Nürnberg
Medal record
Men's football
Representing Germany
FIFA World Cup
Winner	2014 Brazil	Team
Runner-up	2002 Korea/Japan	Team
Third place	2006 Germany	Team
Third place	2010 South Africa	Team
UEFA European Championship
Runner-up	2008 Austria–Switzerland	Team
Third place	2012 Poland–Ukraine	Team
- * Club domestic league appearances and goals

Miroslav Josef Klose (German: [ˈmiːʁoslaf ˈkloːzə]; Polish: Mirosław Józef Klose; born Mirosław Marian Klose; 9 June 1978) is a professional football manager and former player who is the head coach of 2. Bundesliga club 1. FC Nürnberg. Born in Poland, Klose played as a striker for the Germany national team.

Starting his career at FC 08 Homburg, Klose played in the Bundesliga for Kaiserslautern before becoming one of the most prolific scorers in the league with Werder Bremen, where he was awarded the German Footballer of the Year in 2006 and also named in the kicker Bundesliga Team of the Season in 2004–05 and 2005–06. His performances saw him move to Bayern Munich in 2007. During his time at Bayern, Klose won the 2007–08 and 2009–10 league titles. In 2011, Klose moved to Serie A club Lazio, where he won the 2012–13 Coppa Italia and eventually finished his playing career in 2016 after five years at the club.

Klose was part of the Germany squad that won the 2014 World Cup, having previously finished second (2002) and third (2006, 2010) in the competition; he finished as runner-up with Germany at UEFA Euro 2008 and joint-third place at UEFA Euro 2012. He retired from the national team in August 2014, shortly after Germany's victory at the 2014 World Cup.

He is the all-time top scorer for Germany and was the record-holder for most goals scored in the FIFA World Cup (16) for twelve years, before his record was broken by Lionel Messi (21) and Kylian Mbappé (22) in 2026.

== Early life ==
Klose was born in the Silesian city of Opole, Poland. Both of his parents were professional athletes. His father, Josef Klose, was also a professional footballer who played for Odra Opole before leaving Poland in 1978 to play for French club Auxerre. His mother, Barbara Jeż, was a member of the Poland women's national handball team. Josef Klose belonged to a German minority in Poland, an Aussiedler whose family had remained behind when Silesia was ceded to Poland after World War II. In 1986, then eight-year-old Miroslav joined his father in Kusel, West Germany, knowing only two words of German. Klose developed his footballing skill and passion with local club SG Blaubach-Diedelkopf, which at the time was in the West-German seventh division. He was also an apprentice carpenter.

== Club career ==
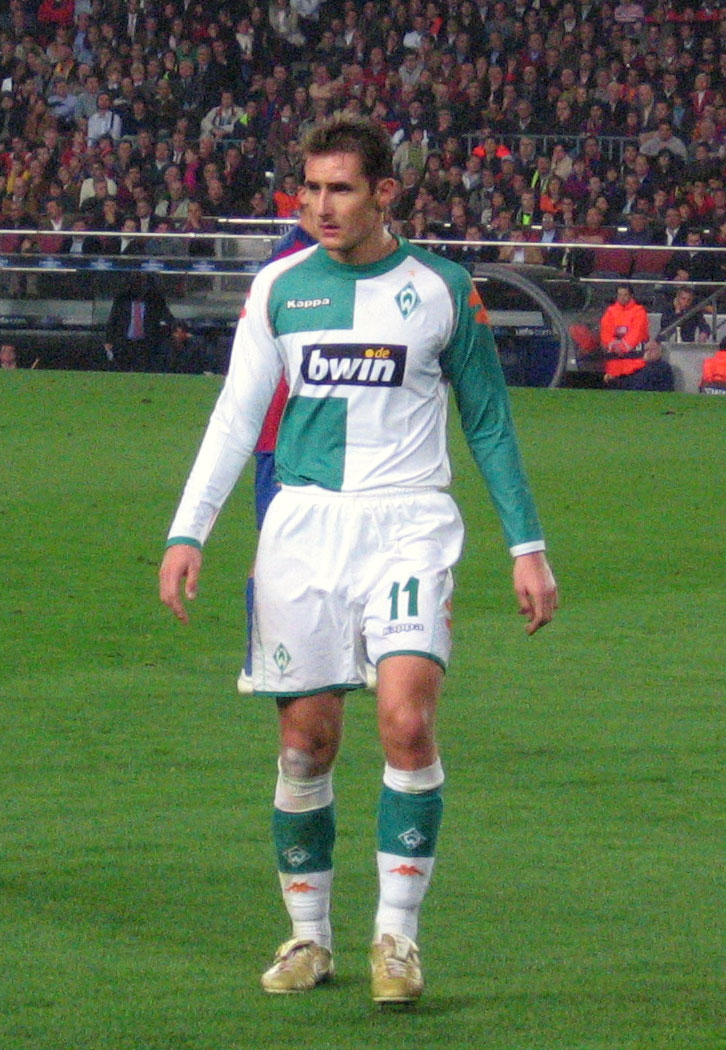
Klose playing for Werder Bremen in 2006

=== Kaiserslautern ===
In 1998, Klose's professional career began at age 20 with a switch to the reserves at former Bundesliga outfit FC Homburg. Twelve months later, he moved to 1. FC Kaiserslautern. He played for the second team and made his first appearance in the Bundesliga in April 2000. He scored 16 goals in the 2001–02 season and was only two goals shy of becoming the top scorer.

=== Werder Bremen ===
In March 2004, Klose signed a four-year contract with Werder Bremen for a €5 million ($6.2 million) transfer fee. He made his league debut on 6 August 2004 as a substitute for Paraguayan striker Nelson Valdez in a 1–0 home win against Schalke 04. On 29 August 2004, Klose scored his first goal, an equaliser, but the Bremen team lost 2–1 at home against VfL Wolfsburg.

On 7 June 2007, Klose confirmed that he would leave Werder Bremen for Bayern Munich either before the 2007–08 season or upon the expiration of his contract with the Bremen team at the end of the 2007–08 season.

=== Bayern Munich ===
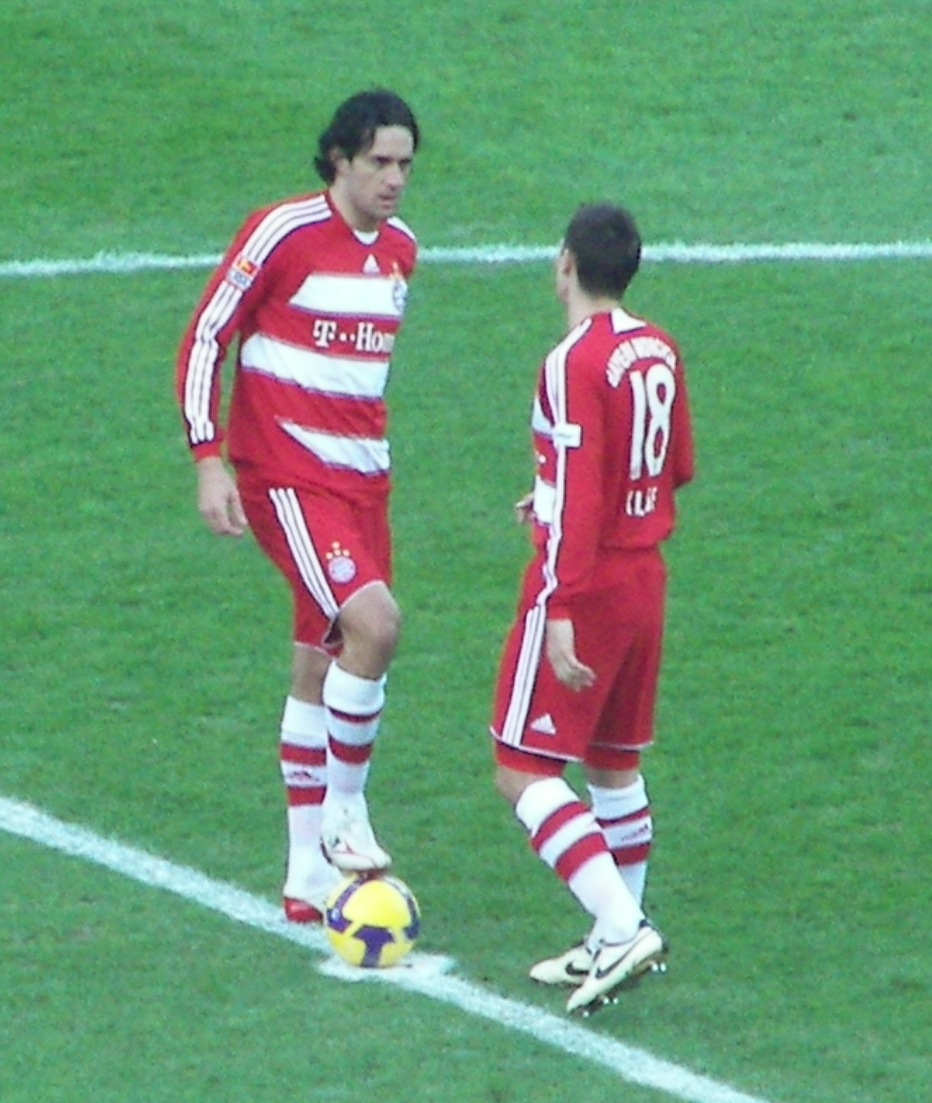
Luca Toni and Klose playing for Bayern Munich against Hertha BSC in 2009

On 26 June 2007, Bayern Munich club president Karl-Heinz Rummenigge confirmed his team had reached an agreement with Werder Bremen regarding the transfer of Klose. Klose completed his medical with Bayern on 28 June 2007 before signing a four-year contract.

Klose won the first major honours of his club career at the end of his first season with Bayern, as they won the Bundesliga and the DFB-Pokal in 2007–08. In 2010, he won the 2010 DFL-Supercup, scoring a goal in the 81st minute.

On 7 June 2011, with his contract about to expire, Klose did not reach an agreement with Bayern, thus leaving the club at the end of the 2010–11 season. He had scored one Bundesliga goal in 20 matches in his final season.

=== Lazio ===
==== 2011–12 season ====
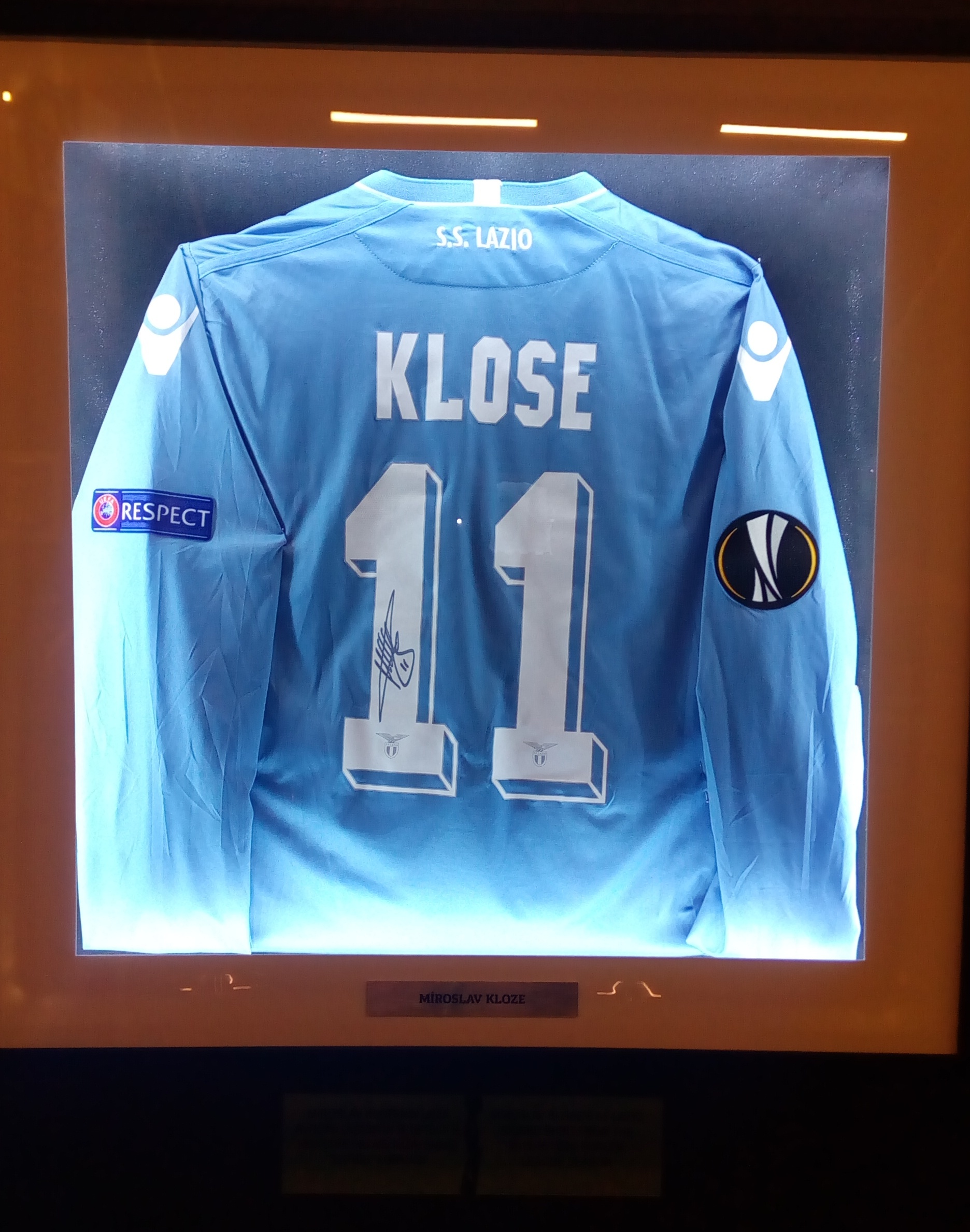
Klose's No.11 Lazio shirt

Klose signed a three-year contract with Italian Serie A club Lazio on 9 June 2011. The move was facilitated by Lazio sporting director Igli Tare, a former teammate of Klose at 1. FC Kaiserslautern. He scored his first goal for Lazio in the 2011–12 UEFA Europa League play-offs and also assisted four other goals. Lazio won that match 6–0 and won the play-off 9–1 on aggregate against Rabotnički. On 9 September 2011, he made his Serie A debut in a 2–2 draw against Milan and scored a goal in the 12th minute, which was the first Serie A goal of the season. Despite having been at the club for only a few months, Lazio coach Edoardo Reja underlined his importance to the team. On 16 October 2011, Klose scored in the 93rd minute to win the Rome derby against Roma for Lazio, 2–1. However, the occasion was tainted by a small section of radical Lazio fans holding a sign adapted from a motto used by the Nazis. The sign read "Klose mit uns", which means "Klose with us". It was intended by those fans as praise for Klose; however, the Nazis used the motto "God with us" and the Lazio fans' sign featured the S's in the same font as the logo of Adolf Hitler's Schutzstaffel (SS). Klose had explicitly condemned the sign, saying, "[P]olitics should stay out of the stadium."

On 10 December 2011, Klose scored twice and assisted one for Lazio in an away game against Lecce, including an 87-minute goal that gave Lazio a 3–2 victory.

==== 2012–13 season ====
On 2 September 2012, Klose scored his first Serie A goal of the season, scoring a brace in Lazio's 3–0 home win against Palermo. On 26 September, Klose accidentally scored a goal with his hand against Napoli for Lazio, unseen by the referee. However, Klose informed the referee and asked that the goal be discounted. The referee then reversed the decision and the goal was discounted.

On 2 December, Klose scored his ninth goal of the season, securing a 2–1 victory over Parma, lifting Lazio into fourth place in Serie A. Two weeks later, on 15 December, he scored a late goal to send his side to a 1–0 victory over second-placed Internazionale, reducing the gap between the two sides in the league table to one point. On 5 May 2013, he scored five goals against Bologna before being substituted for Louis Saha in the 68th minute. It was the first time since the 1984–85 season that a player scored five goals in the same game in Serie A.

On 26 May, Klose won the Coppa Italia, beating Lazio's city rivals Roma 1–0. It was the sixth time in Lazio's history and the first time in the history of the tournament there was a Lazio–Roma derby in the final.

==== 2013–14 season ====
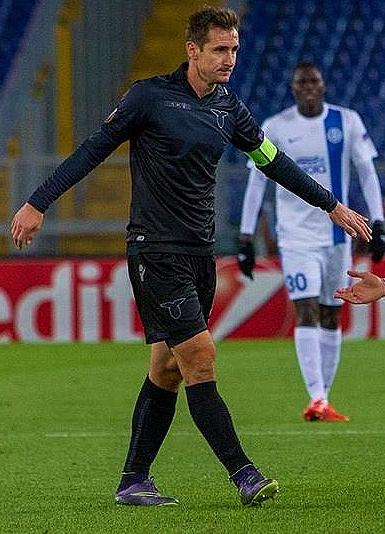
Klose captaining Lazio in a UEFA Europa League match against Dnipro in 2015.

Klose started the season by playing in the 2013 Supercoppa Italiana against Juventus, which ended in a 4–0 loss at the Stadio Olimpico. Klose started the league season by playing 83 minutes in the team's opening league match of the season, a 2–1 home win against Udinese. He scored his first goal of the season on 31 August in a 4–1 away defeat to Juventus. He scored his second league goal of the season on 28 October during the 2–0 home victory against Cagliari.

==== 2014–15 season ====
Klose played his first match of the Serie A season against Milan, in which Lazio was defeated 3–1. He scored three goals and set up two other goals in the first half of the season in 16 appearances in Serie A. He also scored one goal and set up another for Lazio against Bassano in the only 2014–15 Coppa Italia match he played before the winter break. They went on to win the match 7–0. In the second half of the season, he scored 10 goals and set up 5 in 18 appearances, ending the season with 13 goals and 7 assists in Serie A, along with 3 goals and 2 assists in the Coppa Italia in 6 appearances.

==== 2015–16 season ====
On 15 May, Klose scored his final goal for Lazio from a penalty on his final appearance for the club, the final matchday of the 2015–16 Serie A season. The game ended in a 4–2 home loss to Fiorentina. With his 64th goal for Lazio, he equalled Goran Pandev as the club's highest non-Italian goalscorer of all time, and ended his Lazio career as the club's seventh-highest all-time goalscorer. Klose retired on 1 November 2016.

== International career ==
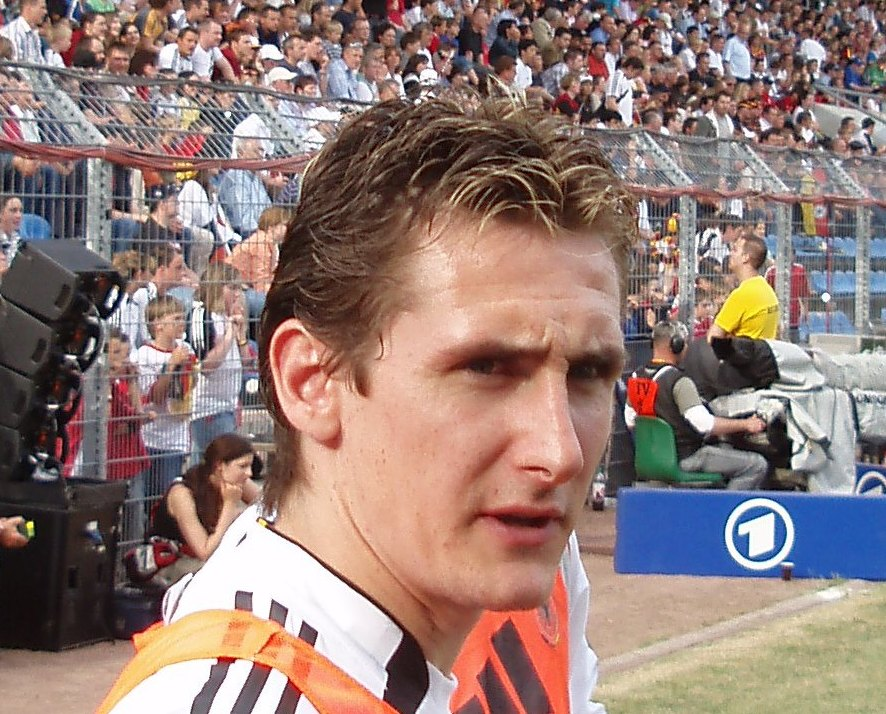
Klose on international duty for Germany at the 2006 FIFA World Cup

Klose's consistency as a goal-scorer in his first Bundesliga season at 1. FC Kaiserslautern earned him attention. In January 2001, then-head coach of the Poland national team, Jerzy Engel, travelled to Germany to persuade Klose to choose to represent Poland. This request was declined by Klose, who said, "I have a German passport, and if things are still running this way, I have a chance to play for Rudi Völler." Klose's hopes were justified, as he would soon score for Germany.

In an interview given to Przegląd Sportowy on 9 June 2008, Klose stated the decision to play for Germany instead of Poland was not an easy one, and if Polish officials had been faster, he would be playing for Poland. Further, he added he does not regret the choice, as with Germany he has won medals in the World Cup tournaments.

=== 2002 World Cup ===
Klose's international debut came on 24 March 2001 in a 2002 FIFA World Cup qualifier against Albania; in the 73rd minute, Germany head coach Rudi Völler put him in as a substitute. Two minutes from time, he headed home the winner in a 2–1 victory for Germany, and celebrated with a front-flip. Four days later, in his second match, Klose helped Germany temporarily lead their qualification group, as he came on in the 67th minute and scored in the 3–2 win against Greece in the 82nd minute, making it two crucial goals in only 33 minutes on the pitch. Two hat-tricks against Israel and Austria in friendlies prior to the upcoming World Cup were enough to establish him in Germany's line-up for the tournament.

Klose came to international prominence at the 2002 World Cup in Korea–Japan with five headed goals for Germany, finishing as the joint second-highest goalscorer alongside Rivaldo. Klose also became the first player to score five headers in a FIFA World Cup, and he celebrated two of his goals with his trademark front-flip, earning him the nickname "Salto-Klose" (German: Salto = somersault). His goal tally included a hat-trick in Germany's 8–0 hammering of Saudi Arabia, as well as one goal each against the Republic of Ireland and Cameroon.

=== Euro 2004 ===
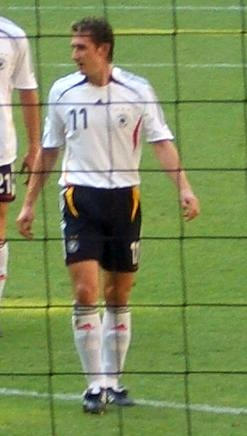
Klose playing in the 2006 World Cup

Klose participated in UEFA Euro 2004 and came on as a substitute in two matches, against Latvia and the Czech Republic, but was not completely fit, since he had just recovered from a knee injury. He was not able to score and Germany was eliminated after the first round.

=== 2006 World Cup ===
In the opening match of the 2006 World Cup in Germany, Klose scored two close-range goals in a 4–2 win over Costa Rica, and added a similar brace in the final group game to defeat Ecuador 3–0 and make Germany the group winners.

Klose scored an 80th-minute headed equaliser against Argentina in the quarter-finals, and Germany won the resulting penalty shootout. With five goals, he finished as the top scorer of the tournament, taking home the FIFA World Cup Golden Boot.

=== Euro 2008 ===
At Euro 2008, Klose started the opening group stage match against Poland and assisted Lukas Podolski's two goals in a 2–0 victory. He played the remaining two group games against Croatia and Austria with no goals of his own. He finally broke through during the knockout stages, scoring for Germany in the quarter-final and the semi-final against Portugal and Turkey respectively. In both matches, he scored Germany's second goal, and both games were won 3–2. However, Klose was unable to score during the final against Spain, which Germany lost 1–0.

=== 2010 World Cup ===
Klose was selected in Germany's final 23-man squad for the third successive World Cup campaign. On 13 June, Klose scored the second goal against Australia in their opening group match, which ended in a 4–0 victory. This goal put him level in World Cup goals with his former national team coach, Jürgen Klinsmann. However, Klose was sent off in the 37th minute of Germany's match against Serbia for amassing his second yellow-card foul of the match, and did not play the match against Ghana because of his expulsion.

Klose opened the scoring in the round of 16 match against England on 27 June 2010 with his 12th World Cup goal, equalling Pelé for fourth on the all-time list, and also notching up his 50th international goal in his 99th international game, as Germany won the match 4–1.

Klose made his 100th international appearance in the quarter-final match against Argentina, becoming only the sixth German player to reach the landmark. He then scored the second and fourth goals against Argentina (Germany winning 4–0), pulling him level with Gerd Müller's all-time German World Cup goalscoring record.

=== Euro 2012 ===
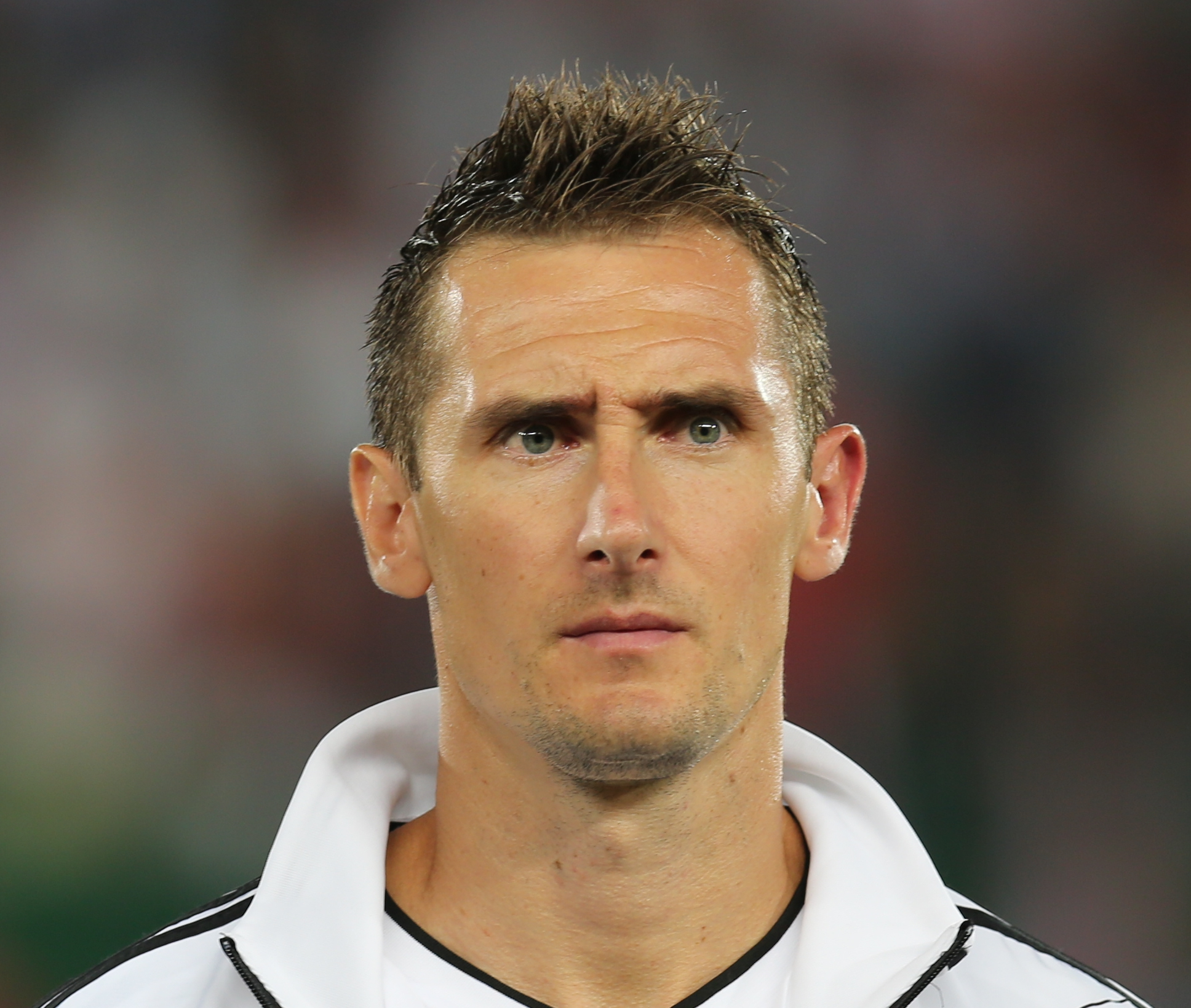
Klose before a match against Austria in 2012

During the Euro 2012 qualifiers, Klose scored at least one goal in every single game he played, striking against all of Germany's opponents: Belgium, Azerbaijan, Turkey, Kazakhstan and Austria. Gaining only six caps during the qualification campaign, he scored nine goals and provided two assists, making him Europe's second-most-successful striker for this period behind Klaas-Jan Huntelaar, who scored 12 times in 8 matches. At the end of the qualifying campaign, Klose had achieved 21 assists and 63 goals while playing for Germany, trailing Gerd Müller's German goalscoring record by five (albeit playing almost twice as many internationals compared to Müller).

At the tournament, Klose came off the bench in all three of Germany's Group B games, but failed to score a goal. In the quarter-final game against Greece, Klose started the match and scored Germany's third goal in a 4–2 win. Klose again had to come off the bench in the semi-final against Italy, but failed to add to his goal tally as Germany were eliminated with a 2–1 loss.

=== 2014 World Cup and retirement ===
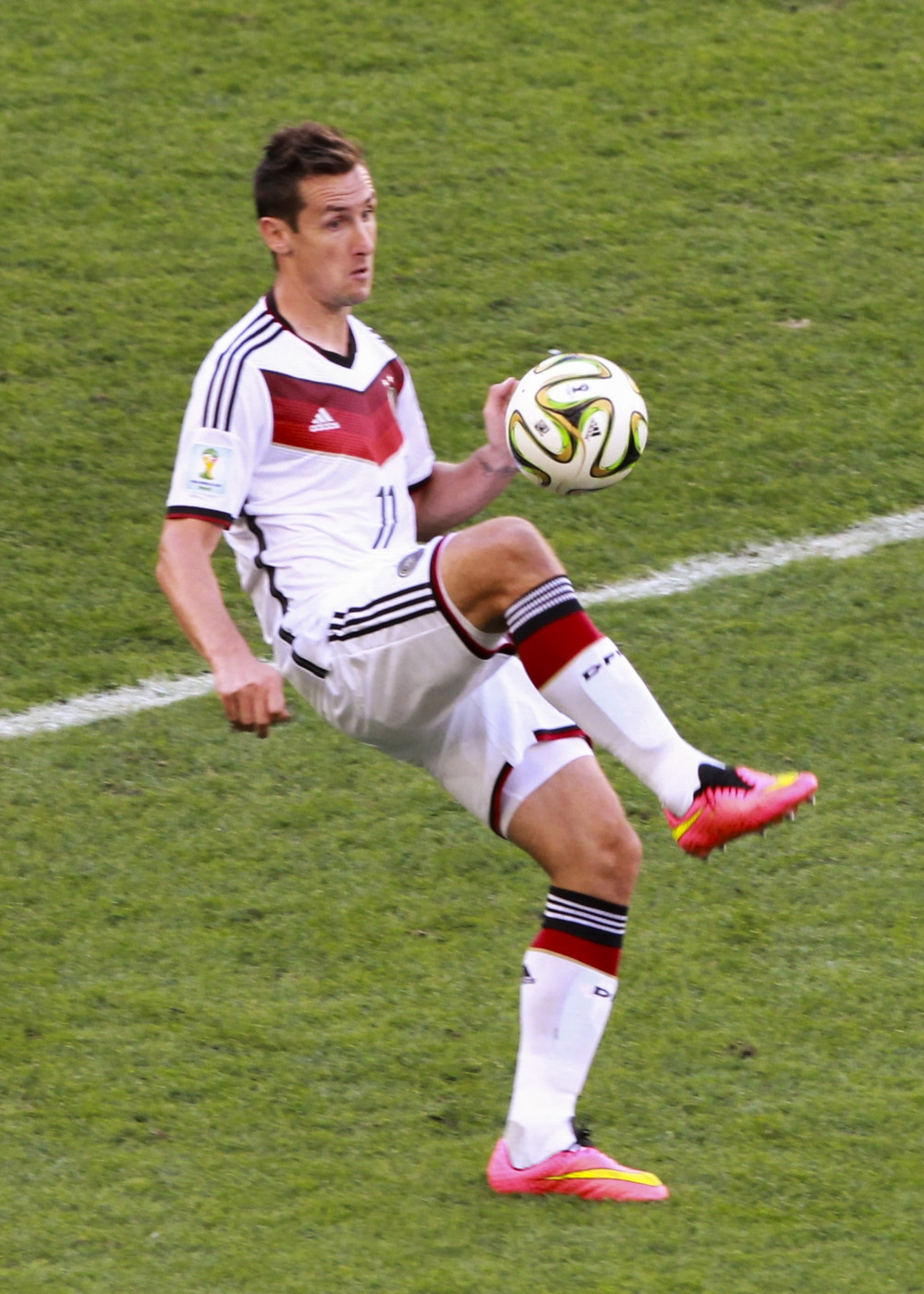
Klose playing in the 2014 World Cup final

Prior to the tournament, Klose said the 2014 World Cup would be his final one for Germany, stating he wanted one more shot at trying to win the World Cup and having done that, he was content. On 6 June 2014, in Germany's final friendly before the World Cup against Armenia, Klose scored his 69th international goal, thus breaking Gerd Müller's record of 68 goals and becoming Germany's record goalscorer.

Klose scored his record-equalling 15th World Cup goal to help Germany to a 2–2 draw against Ghana on 21 June 2014, after entering the game as a 69th-minute substitute for Mario Götze (who had scored Germany's first goal) with his team trailing 2–1. This tied him with the Brazilian player Ronaldo. With this goal, Klose became the third player in history to score in four different World Cups. On 8 July, Klose scored a record 16th World Cup goal in the 23rd minute against hosts Brazil in the semi-finals, his second goal of the 2014 World Cup. That goal gave Germany a 2–0 lead en route to a 7–1 win over Brazil, and Klose surpassed Ronaldo's previous record of 15 World Cup goals. (Note: The record has since been surpassed by Lionel Messi in 2026.) Klose set another record by becoming the first player to appear in four consecutive World Cup semi-finals. Klose started in the World Cup final against Argentina and played until the 88th minute, when he was substituted for Mario Götze. Götze would score the 113th-minute goal which gave Germany a 1–0 victory over Argentina, earning Germany's fourth World Cup title overall and first as a reunited country. Klose announced his retirement from international football one month after the final.

== Managerial career ==
=== Youth and assistant manager ===
On 1 November 2016, Klose was hired to become part of the coaching staff of the German national team. Klose said, "I celebrated my greatest successes with the national team and it was a wonderful and unforgettable time. That's why I'm delighted to return to the DFB. In the past few months, I have thought a lot about continuing my playing career, but also about pursuing other avenues, namely becoming a coach."

On 11 May 2018, Bayern Munich named Klose as their coach for the U-17 team. Klose signed a two-year contract until the end of June 2020.

On 7 May 2020, Klose signed a one-year contract to become the first-team assistant manager under Hansi Flick. He left Bayern Munich in May 2021.

=== Rheindorf Altach ===
On 17 June 2022, it was announced that Klose would take over as head coach of Austrian Bundesliga club Rheindorf Altach. His debut on 16 July was a 3–1 win at third-tier TWL Elektra in the first round of the Austrian Cup, followed eight days later by a 2–1 loss away to TSV Hartberg on the first day of the league season. In March 2023, Altach parted ways with Klose.

=== 1. FC Nürnberg ===
On 11 June 2024, 2. Bundesliga club 1. FC Nürnberg announced Klose as their new head coach. In his first season in charge, Klose guided Nürnberg to a 10th-place finish in the 2. Bundesliga, stabilising the team in mid-table. On 12 February 2026, he extended his contract with the club until 2028.

== Player profile ==
=== Style of play ===
A prolific goalscorer, Klose was a large and powerful striker who was known in particular for his ability in the air as a centre-forward, due to his strength, timing, elevation and heading accuracy, as well as his finishing ability. In his prime, he was also a quick player who was known for his turn of pace, movement, and positional sense in the penalty area, which enabled him to lose his markers and get on the end of crosses. In addition to his physical attributes, he possessed good technique and hold-up play with his back to goal, and was capable of creating space for other players, or setting-up goals for teammates in addition to scoring them himself, due to his tactical intelligence and ability to interpret the game. He was also known for his dedication and good behaviour on the pitch.

=== Goal celebrations ===
Earlier in his career, Klose was known for his acrobatic goalscoring celebrations, which included mid-air somersaults.

=== Fair play ===
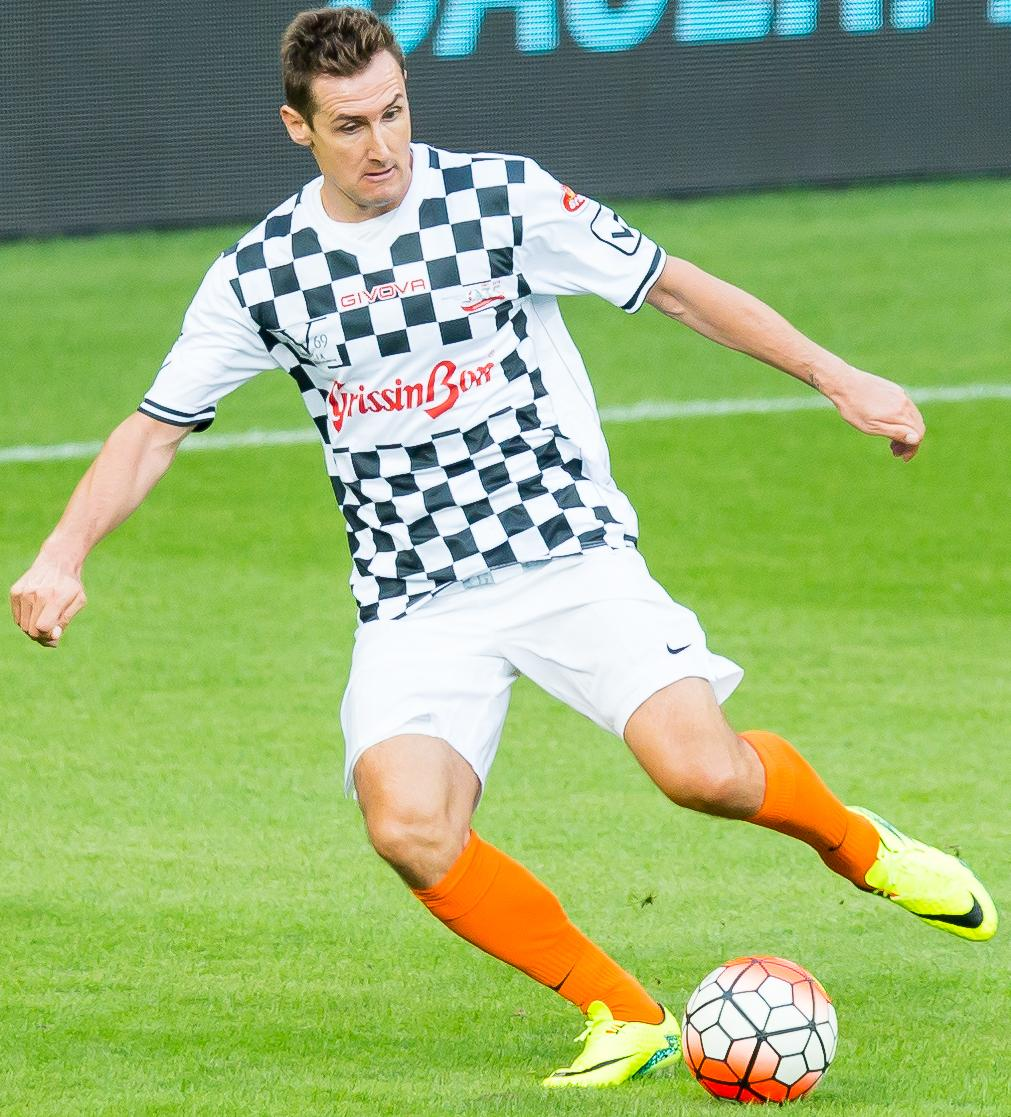
Klose playing in a charity match in 2016. Klose is known for a strong sense of sportsmanship.

Throughout his career, Klose often stood out for his fair play and honesty in addition to his skill and goalscoring as a footballer. On 30 April 2005, while playing for Werder Bremen, Klose refused to accept a penalty given against Arminia Bielefeld as he felt the decision was incorrect. He was later given a fair play award for his actions, although he had mixed feelings about the award, stating, "It's a big honour for me to receive this award, but I am also a bit irritated. For me, it was something you should always do. I would do it again – always."

At the end of September 2012, Klose scored a goal using his hand for Lazio against Napoli. He admitted this to the referee, who took back his decision to award the goal, spared Klose from a yellow card and shook his hand. Later that year, he was once again given a fair play award for his actions by the German Football Association, later commenting, "The referee asked me if I had touched the ball with my hand and it was not a problem for me to answer 'yes'. There are many youngsters who watch football on TV and we are role models for them." In 2016, he was given the Sport Ethics Award for his honesty at the University of Rome Tor Vergata, and subsequently added regarding the incident, "Napoli? For me it was easy, it's my character. We need to set an example, ... If I can even help out the referees, I will do so willingly."

== Personal life ==
Klose and his wife Sylwia have twin sons, Luan and Noah. In a 2007 interview with Der Spiegel, he stated that at home, he and his wife speak Polish to their children, who learn German in school. In a 2003 interview, Klose said he has dual nationality. In a 2011 interview, he said he initially had a Polish passport, then accepted German citizenship at the age of 18.

Klose is a devout Catholic.

== Career statistics ==
=== Club ===
Appearances and goals by club, season and competition
Club	Season	League			National cup (Note: Includes DFB-Pokal, Coppa Italia)		League cup (Note: Includes DFL-Ligapokal)		Europe		Other		Total	
Club	Season	Division	Apps	Goals	Apps	Goals	Apps	Goals	Apps	Goals	Apps	Goals	Apps	Goals
FC 08 Homburg	1998–99	Regionalliga West/Südwest	18	1	—		—		—		—		18	1
1. FC Kaiserslautern II	1999–2000	Regionalliga West/Südwest	36	11	—		—		—		—		36	11
1. FC Kaiserslautern II	2000–01	Oberliga Südwest	14	15	—		—		—		—		14	15
1. FC Kaiserslautern II	Total		50	26	—		—		—		—		50	26
1. FC Kaiserslautern	1999–2000	Bundesliga	2	0	0	0	0	0	0	0	—		2	0
1. FC Kaiserslautern	2000–01	Bundesliga	29	9	2	0	2	0	12 (Note: Appearances in UEFA Cup)	2	—		45	11
1. FC Kaiserslautern	2001–02	Bundesliga	31	16	4	0	—		—		—		35	16
1. FC Kaiserslautern	2002–03	Bundesliga	32	9	4	4	—		—		—		36	13
1. FC Kaiserslautern	2003–04	Bundesliga	26	10	1	1	—		2	1	—		29	12
1. FC Kaiserslautern	Total		120	44	11	5	2	0	14	3	—		147	52
Werder Bremen	2004–05	Bundesliga	32	15	4	0	1	0	8 (Note: Appearances in UEFA Champions League)	2	—		45	17
Werder Bremen	2005–06	Bundesliga	26	25	3	2	2	0	9	4	—		40	31
Werder Bremen	2006–07	Bundesliga	31	13	1	0	2	0	13	2	—		47	15
Werder Bremen	Total		89	53	8	2	5	0	30	8	—		132	63
Bayern Munich	2007–08	Bundesliga	27	10	6	5	2	1	12	5	—		47	21
Bayern Munich	2008–09	Bundesliga	26	10	4	3	—		8	7	—		38	20
Bayern Munich	2009–10	Bundesliga	25	3	5	2	—		8	1	—		38	6
Bayern Munich	2010–11	Bundesliga	20	1	4	3	—		2	1	1 (Note: Appearance in DFL-Supercup)	1	27	6
Bayern Munich	Total		98	24	19	13	2	1	30	14	1	1	149	53
Lazio	2011–12	Serie A	27	12	2	0	—		6 (Note: Appearances in UEFA Europa League)	3	—		35	15
Lazio	2012–13	Serie A	29	15	2	0	—		5	1	—		36	16
Lazio	2013–14	Serie A	25	7	0	0	—		3	1	1 (Note: Appearance in Supercoppa Italiana)	0	29	8
Lazio	2014–15	Serie A	34	13	6	3	—		—		—		40	16
Lazio	2015–16	Serie A	24	7	1	0	—		4	1	1	0	30	8
Lazio	Total		139	54	11	3	0	0	18	6	2	0	170	63
Career total			514	202	49	23	9	1	92	31	3	1	667	258

=== International ===
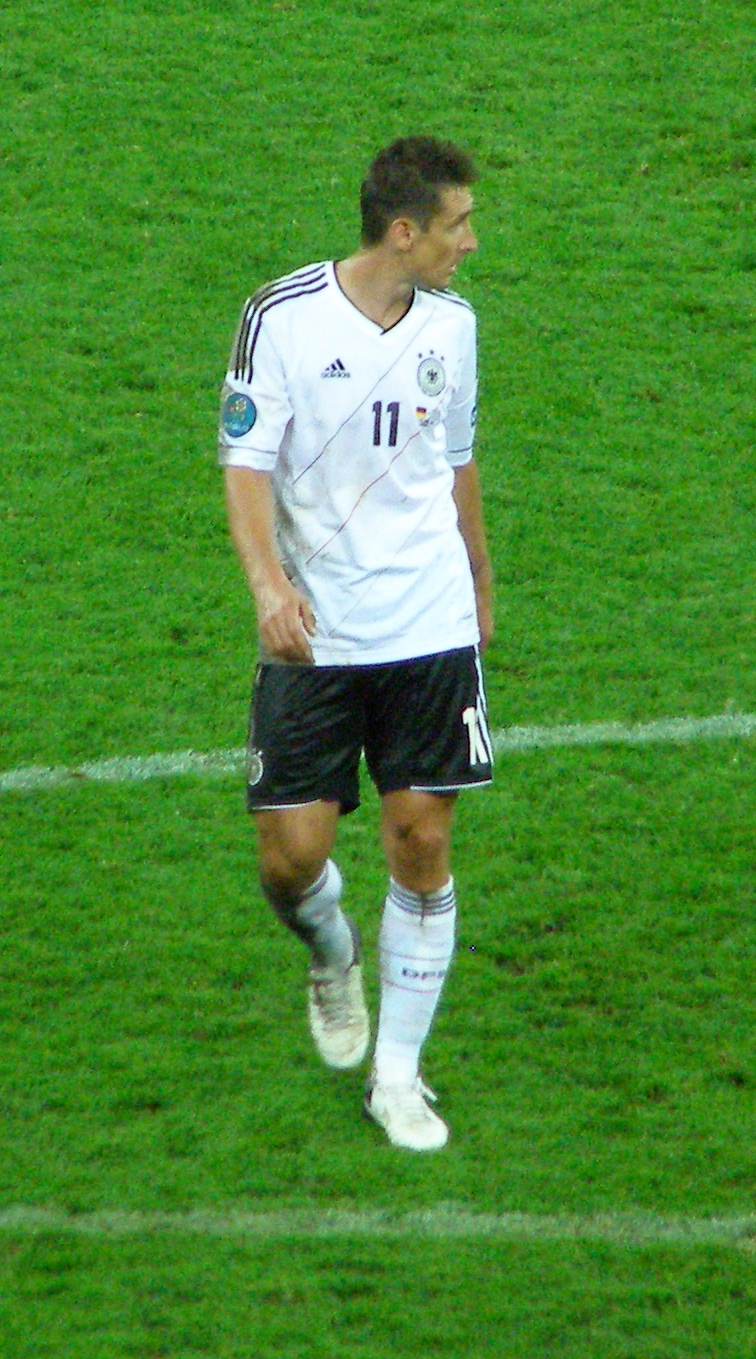
Klose playing against Greece at UEFA Euro 2012.

Appearances and goals by national team and year
National team	Year	Apps	Goals
Germany	2001	7	2
Germany	2002	17	12
Germany	2003	10	1
Germany	2004	11	5
Germany	2005	5	0
Germany	2006	17	13
Germany	2007	5	3
Germany	2008	15	8
Germany	2009	6	4
Germany	2010	12	10
Germany	2011	8	5
Germany	2012	13	4
Germany	2013	4	1
Germany	2014	7	3
Total		137	71

=== Managerial ===
As of 21 November 2026

Managerial record by team and tenure
Team	From	To	Record								Ref
Team	From	To	G	W	D	L	GF	GA	GD	Win %	Ref
Rheindorf Altach	1 July 2022	20 March 2023	24	5	5	14	22	47	−25	20.83	
1. FC Nürnberg	11 June 2024	present	85	34	22	29	145	130	+15	40.00	
Total			109	39	27	43	167	177	−10	35.78	—

== Honours ==
Werder Bremen

- DFL-Ligapokal: 2006

Bayern Munich

- Bundesliga: 2007–08, 2009–10
- DFB-Pokal: 2007–08, 2009–10
- DFL-Ligapokal: 2007
- DFL-Supercup: 2010
- UEFA Champions League runner-up: 2009–10

Lazio

- Coppa Italia: 2012–13

Germany

- FIFA World Cup: 2014; runner-up: 2002; third place: 2006, 2010
- UEFA European Championship: runner-up: 2008; third place: 2012

Individual

- FIFA World Cup Silver Shoe: 2002
- FIFA World Cup Golden Shoe: 2006
- FIFA World Cup All-Star Team: 2002, 2006
- Footballer of the Year in Germany: 2006
- Bundesliga Player of the Season: 2005–06
- Bundesliga top goalscorer: 2005–06 (25 goals)
- Bundesliga top assist provider: 2005–06, 2006–07
- VDV Bundesliga Player of the Season: 2005–06
- kicker Bundesliga Team of the Season: 2004–05, 2005–06
- UEFA awards 100 caps: 2011
- UEFA President's Award: 2023

Orders

- Silbernes Lorbeerblatt: 2002, 2006, 2010, 2014

Records

- Germany all-time top scorer (71 goals)
- Germany all-time top scorer at the FIFA World Cup (16 goals)
- Most headed goals at FIFA World Cup (7 goals)

== See also ==
- List of top international men's football goalscorers by country
- List of men's footballers with 100 or more international caps
- List of men's footballers with 50 or more international goals
- List of FIFA World Cup top goalscorers
