= Rainer Hauck =

German footballer

Personal information
- Date of birth: 16 January 1978 (age 48)
- Place of birth: Germany
- Height: 1.80 m (5 ft 11 in)
- Position: Defender

Youth career
- Ludwigshafener SC
- ASV Maxdorf
- MTSV Beindersheim
- Viktoria Lambsheim
- SV Maudach
- 1993–1997: 1. FC Kaiserslautern

Senior career*
Years	Team	Apps	(Gls)
1997–2002	1. FC Kaiserslautern II		
2000–2001	1. FC Kaiserslautern	2	(0)
2002–2004	F91 Dudelange		
2004–2006	Wormatia Worms	46	(0)
2006–2010	SC Hauenstein		
2010–2011	ASV Fußgönheim		
- * Club domestic league appearances and goals as of 10:47, 15 August 2011 (UTC)

Rainer Hauck (born 16 January 1978) is a German footballer. He made his debut on the professional league level in the Bundesliga for 1. FC Kaiserslautern on 4 November 2000 when he started in a game against FC Schalke 04.
