= Tim Wiese =

German footballer (born 1981)

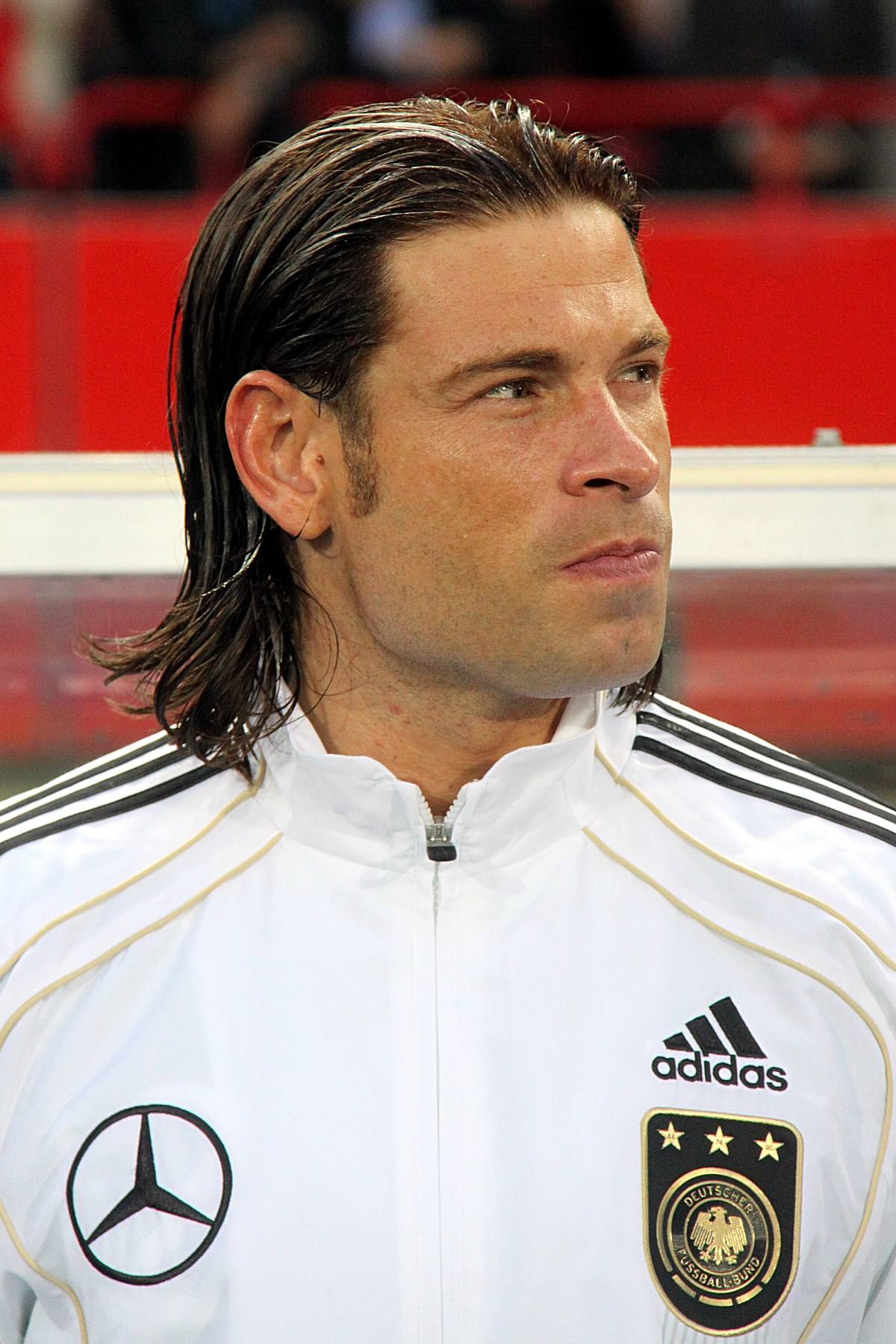
- Wiese with Germany in 2011

Personal information
- Birth name: Tim Wiese
- Date of birth: 17 December 1981 (age 44)
- Place of birth: Bergisch Gladbach, West Germany
- Height: 1.93 m (6 ft 4 in)
- Position: Goalkeeper

Youth career
- 1987–1989: DJK Dürscheid
- 1989–1999: Bayer Leverkusen

Senior career*
Years	Team	Apps	(Gls)
1999–2001	Fortuna Köln	23	(0)
2001–2002	1. FC Kaiserslautern II	15	(0)
2002–2005	1. FC Kaiserslautern	65	(0)
2005–2012	Werder Bremen	194	(0)
2012–2014	1899 Hoffenheim	10	(0)
2017	SSV Dillingen	1	(0)
Total		308	(0)

International career
2003–2005	Germany U21	13	(0)
2008–2012	Germany	6	(0)
Medal record
Representing Germany
FIFA World Cup
Third place	2010 South Africa	Team
UEFA European Championship
Bronze medal – third place	2012 Poland–Ukraine	Team
- * Club domestic league appearances and goals

Tim Wiese (German pronunciation: [tɪm ˈviːzə]; born 17 December 1981) is a German former professional footballer who played as a goalkeeper.

Having progressed through the youth teams at DJK Dürscheid and Bayer Leverkusen, Wiese started his professional career at Fortuna Köln, and went on to play for 1. FC Kaiserslautern and Werder Bremen before signing for 1899 Hoffenheim in 2012.

Wiese made 13 appearances for the German under-21 squad between 2003 and 2005, before making his full international debut three years later against England. He went on to win five further caps and was part of the German 2010 FIFA World Cup squad, but did not make an appearance in that tournament.

Following Wiese's retirement from football in 2014, he gained a significant amount of muscle mass and was subsequently linked to a career in professional wrestling, eventually having a match in WWE in 2016.

== Association football career ==
=== Club ===
==== Early career and Fortuna Köln ====
Wiese started his playing career at DJK Dürscheid, in 1987. Two years later, he moved to Bayer Leverkusen's youth system, before moving to Fortuna Köln, where he made his first-team debut in the Regionalliga in 2000.

==== 1. FC Kaiserslautern ====
Wiese moved to Bundesliga side Kaiserslautern in the winter break of the 2001–02 season and initially played for their reserve squad in the third division and served as backup for Georg Koch and Roman Weidenfeller in the first team. Following Weidenfeller's transfer to Borussia Dortmund, he fought with Koch for the place of the first goalkeeper and made his Bundesliga debut at the beginning of the 2002–03 season, being replaced by Koch after conceding four goals in two matches. After the winter break, however, he managed to secure himself the position of the first-choice goalkeeper and established himself as one of the most talented new keepers in the Bundesliga. He was considered first-choice throughout the 2003–04 season, despite being sent off during the second match of the season (the first of two red cards he has received during his league career). He remained the first goalkeeper for Kaiserslautern until late November 2004, when he lost his place to veteran Thomas Ernst.

==== Werder Bremen ====
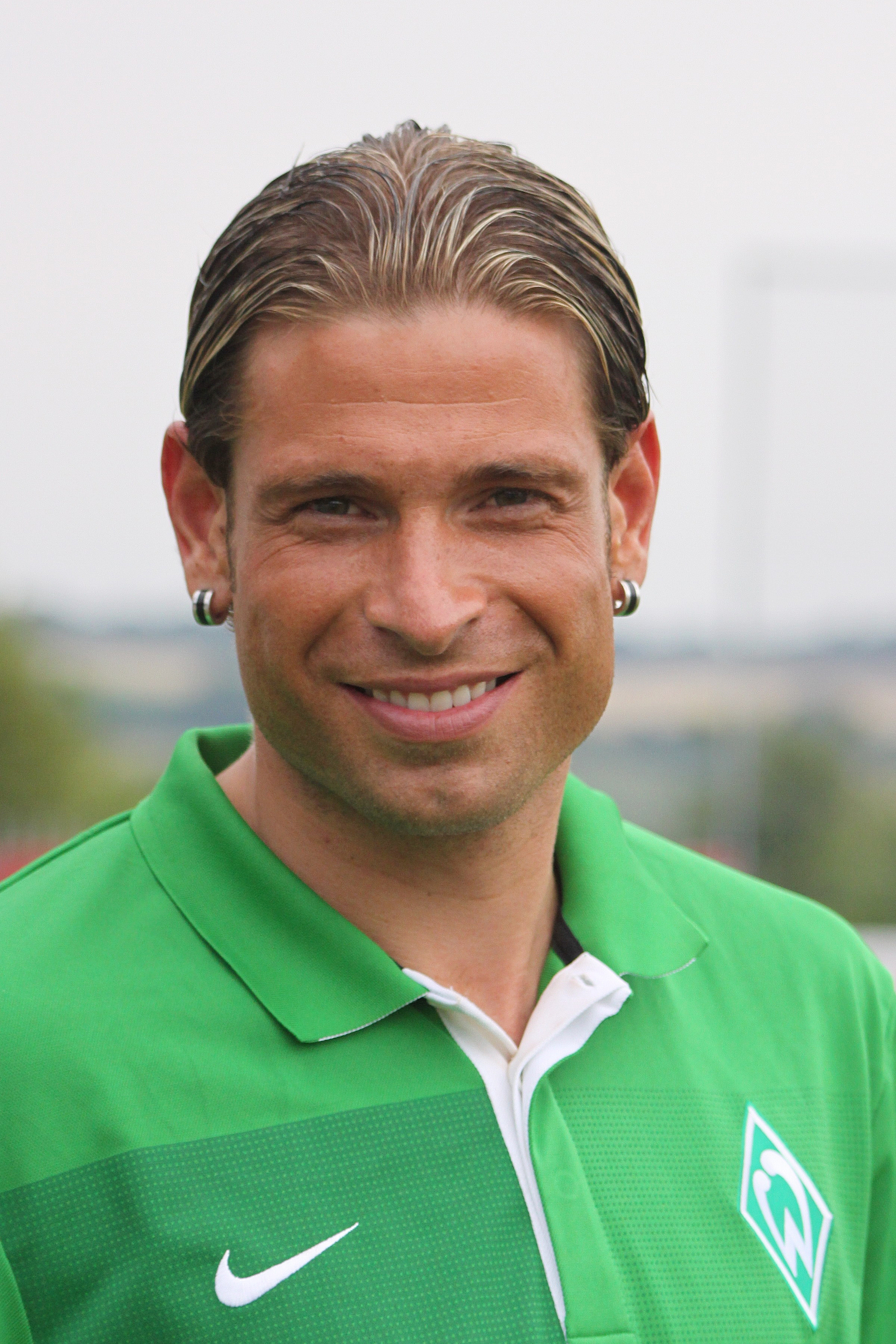
Wiese with Werder Bremen in 2009

Wiese moved to Werder Bremen in 2005 and was favoured to replace the aging Andreas Reinke, but tore his cruciate ligaments twice and missed the entire first part of the season. Following Reinke sustaining an injury in a match against VfB Stuttgart in February 2006, Wiese made his Bundesliga debut for Werder Bremen, and remained their first goalkeeper for the rest of the 2005–06 season.

Wiese, who is often compared to former German goalkeeper Oliver Kahn for his emotional outbursts, had a shaky start, with an error against Juventus in the second round of the UEFA Champions League on 7 March 2006 being of particular note. With only two minutes of the game left to play, and Bremen on course to reach the quarter-finals, he made a routine catch, but then dropped the ball as he rolled on the ground, allowing Emerson to score and Juventus to progress. He has stabilized since then, however, and was vital for Bremen's late surge that moved them past rivals Hamburger SV to claim second place during the 2005–06 season.

In the 2006–07 season, Wiese eventually established himself as the first goalkeeper at Werder Bremen and only missed three Bundesliga matches throughout the season. In the 2008–09 DFB-Pokal semi-final against Hamburg, Wiese helped Werder Bremen progress to the final when he saved three consecutive penalties.

==== 1899 Hoffenheim ====
On 2 May 2012, Wiese signed for 1899 Hoffenheim for an undisclosed fee, and was made club captain in August. A poor start to the season saw Wiese conceding 15 goals in four games, resulting in Hoffenheim's manager Markus Babbel issuing a statement defending the goalkeeper. In November 2012, it was announced that Wiese had injured his knee in a training session and would be unavailable until January. Following the signing of Heurelho Gomes from Tottenham Hotspur on loan at the end of January 2013, Wiese was dropped from the squad, with Hoffenheim's manager Andreas Müller stating, "Tim doesn't have a chance in the current situation. No matter what he does, he doesn't have an opportunity to be assessed sensibly." Wiese and teammate Tobias Weis were fined an undisclosed amount following an incident at a carnival party on 11 February 2013, where the two players were ejected by security. In March 2013, Müller announced that Wiese could leave the club on a free transfer if they were relegated, prompting several of his teammates to come to his defence, including Weis and team captain Sejad Salihović. During the season, Wiese made ten appearances for Hoffenheim, conceding 25 goals, with his last appearance coming in a 2–1 defeat against Eintracht Frankfurt on 26 January. Hoffenheim avoided relegation to the 2. Bundesliga, prompting further speculation about Wiese's future at the club.

His contract with Hoffenheim was mutually terminated on 21 January 2014, making him a free agent, after it was revealed that his body was in a bodybuilding style, unsuited to professional football.

=== International ===
Wiese earned his first international cap for Germany against England on 19 November 2008, when he came in as a substitute for René Adler at the beginning of the second half.

Wiese was a squad member for Germany in the 2010 FIFA World Cup, but was the only player not seeing any action as an understudy to Schalke 04 goalkeeper Manuel Neuer and was denied an appearance in the third-place playoff due to injury, enabling Bayern Munich veteran Hans-Jörg Butt to step in.

=== Retirement ===
Wiese announced his retirement from professional football on 17 September 2014, stating, "I am not a dreamer, but a realist and I assume that I have my best years behind me and I will no longer play as a professional." In March 2017, Wiese returned to football for a one-off match with German eighth-division side SSV Dillingen of the Kreisliga Schwaben-Nord. Dillingen lost the match 2–1 to TSV Haunsheim on 1 April 2017.

== Professional wrestling ==
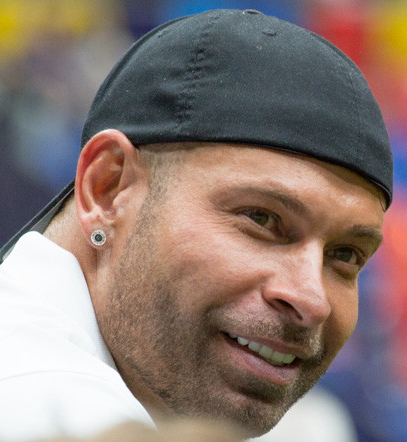
Wiese in 2018

In September 2014, Wiese claimed he had been offered a development contract by WWE to join their NXT division. He appeared as a guest timekeeper at a WWE live event in Frankfurt. On 7 June 2016, it was reported that Wiese accepted Triple H's invitation to train at WWE's developmental facility, the WWE Performance Center. Wiese made his professional wrestling debut at a WWE live event in Munich on 3 November 2016, teaming with Sheamus and Cesaro to defeat The Shining Stars and Bo Dallas. Wiese left the WWE in 2017.

== Personal life ==
Wiese has been married to his longtime spouse Grit Freiberg since 20 December 2010, and has a daughter. He completed his Realschulabschluss at a comprehensive school in Kürten.

== Career statistics ==
=== Club ===
Appearances and goals by club, season and competition
Club	Season	League			DFB-Pokal		DFL-Ligapokal		Europe		Other		Total	
Club	Season	Division	Apps	Goals	Apps	Goals	Apps	Goals	Apps	Goals	Apps	Goals	Apps	Goals
Fortuna Köln	2000–01	Regionalliga Nord	2	0	1	0	—		—		—		3	0
Fortuna Köln	2001–02	Regionalliga Nord	21	0	0	0	—		—		—		21	0
Fortuna Köln	Total		23	0	1	0	—		—		—		24	0
1. FC Kaiserslautern II	2001–02	Regionalliga Süd	11	0	—		—		—		—		11	0
1. FC Kaiserslautern II	2002–03	Regionalliga Süd	4	0	—		—		—		—		4	0
1. FC Kaiserslautern II	Total		15	0	—		—		—		—		15	0
1. FC Kaiserslautern	2002–03	Bundesliga	21	0	5	0	—		—		—		26	0
1. FC Kaiserslautern	2003–04	Bundesliga	30	0	1	0	—		2 (Note: Appearance(s) in UEFA Cup)	0	—		33	0
1. FC Kaiserslautern	2004–05	Bundesliga	14	0	0	0	—		—		—		14	0
1. FC Kaiserslautern	Total		65	0	6	0	—		2	0	—		73	0
Werder Bremen	2005–06	Bundesliga	15	0	0	0	1	0	2 (Note: Appearance(s) in UEFA Champions League)	0	—		18	0
Werder Bremen	2006–07	Bundesliga	31	0	0	0	1	0	12 (Note: Five appearances in UEFA Champions League, seven appearances in UEFA Cup)	0	—		44	0
Werder Bremen	2007–08	Bundesliga	31	0	3	0	1	0	10 (Note: Six appearances in UEFA Champions League, four appearances in UEFA Cup)	0	—		45	0
Werder Bremen	2008–09	Bundesliga	29	0	5	0	—		12 (Note: Four appearances in UEFA Champions League, eight appearances in UEFA Cup)	0	—		46	0
Werder Bremen	2009–10	Bundesliga	31	0	6	0	—		10 (Note: Appearance(s) in UEFA Europa League)	0	1 (Note: Appearance(s) in German Supercup)	0	48	0
Werder Bremen	2010–11	Bundesliga	29	0	1	0	—		7	0	—		37	0
Werder Bremen	2011–12	Bundesliga	28	0	1	0	—		—		—		29	0
Werder Bremen	Total		194	0	16	0	3	0	53	0	1	0	267	0
1899 Hoffenheim	2012–13	Bundesliga	10	0	1	0	—		—		0	0	11	0
1899 Hoffenheim	2013–14	Bundesliga	0	0	0	0	—		—		—		0	0
1899 Hoffenheim	Total		10	0	1	0	—		—		—		11	0
SSV Dillingen	2016–17	Kreisliga Schwaben-Nord	1	0	0	0	—		—		—		1	0
Career total			308	0	24	0	3	0	55	0	1	0	391	0

=== International ===
Appearances and goals by national team and year
National team	Year	Apps	Goals
Germany	2008	1	0
Germany	2009	1	0
Germany	2010	1	0
Germany	2011	2	0
Germany	2012	1	0
Total		6	0

== Honours ==
Werder Bremen

- DFB-Pokal: 2008–09
- DFL-Ligapokal: 2006
- UEFA Cup runner-up: 2008–09

Germany

- FIFA World Cup third place: 2010
- UEFA European Championship third place: 2012

Orders

- Silbernes Lorbeerblatt: 2010
