= Andreas Buck =

German former professional footballer

Personal information
- Date of birth: 29 December 1967 (age 58)
- Place of birth: Geislingen an der Steige, West Germany
- Height: 1.80 m (5 ft 11 in)
- Position: Midfielder

Youth career
- SC Geislingen

Senior career*
Years	Team	Apps	(Gls)
1985–1988	VfL Kirchheim/Teck		
1988–1990	SC Freiburg	65	(0)
1990–1997	VfB Stuttgart	165	(10)
1997–2002	1. FC Kaiserslautern	103	(15)
2002–2003	Mainz 05	11	(2)
2003	Eintracht Bad Kreuznach		
- * Club domestic league appearances and goals

Andreas Buck (born 29 December 1967) is a German former professional footballer who played as a midfielder.

== Honours ==
VfB Stuttgart

- Bundesliga: 1991–92
- DFB-Pokal: 1996–97
- DFL-Supercup: 1992

1. FC Kaiserslautern

- Bundesliga: 1997–98
