= Marco Stark (German footballer) =

German footballer

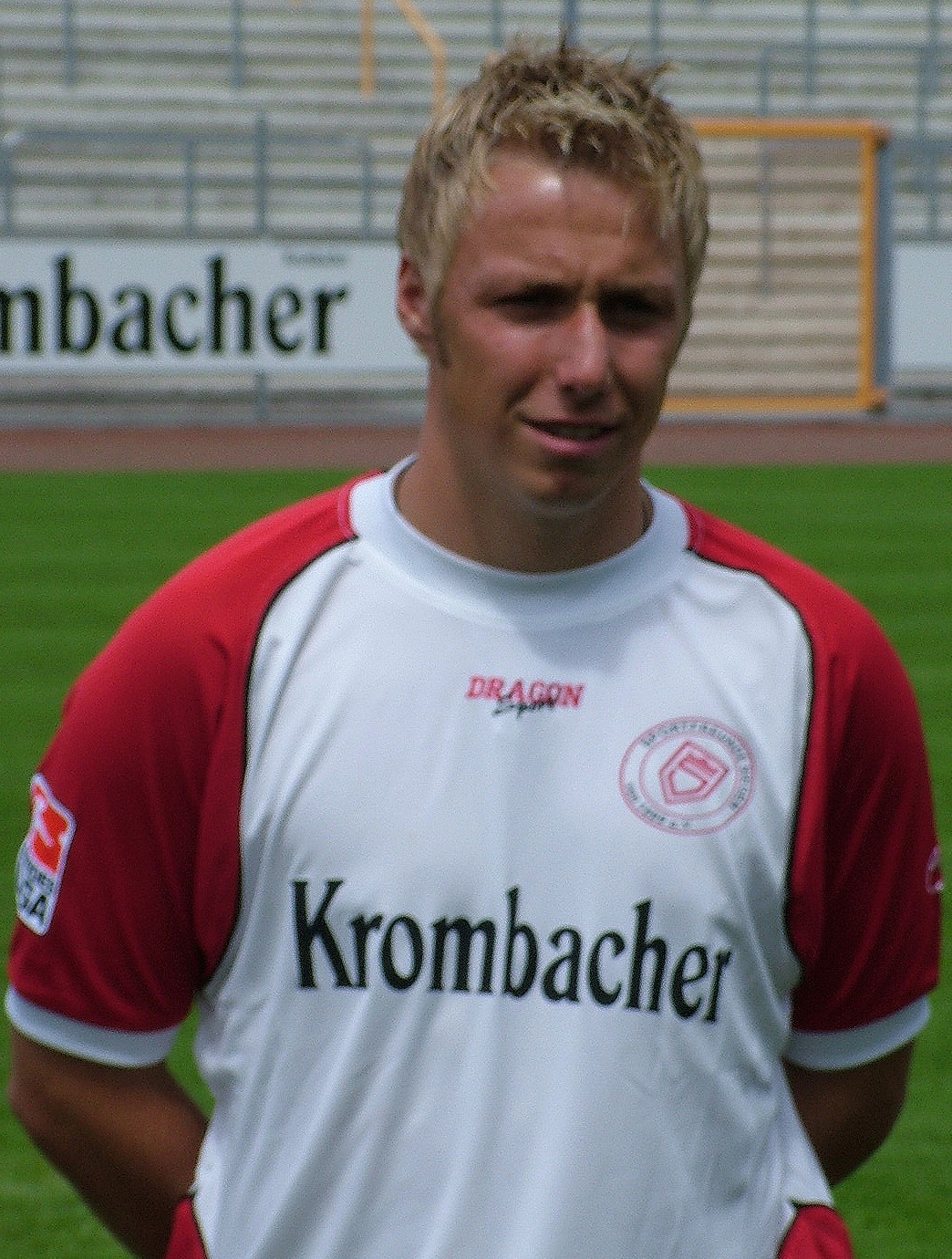

Personal information
- Date of birth: July 9, 1981 (age 45)
- Place of birth: Worms, West Germany
- Height: 1.84 m (6 ft 0 in)
- Position: Defender

Team information
- Current team: Wormatia Worms
- Number: 22

Youth career
- Wormatia Worms
- ?–1995: TSG Pfeddersheim

Senior career*
Years	Team	Apps	(Gls)
1995–2001	1. FC Kaiserslautern	2	(0)
2001–2002	1. FC Saarbrücken	20	(0)
2002–2003	SV Wacker Burghausen	16	(0)
2004–2007	Sportfreunde Siegen	66	(1)
2007–2008	SV Sandhausen	40	(1)
2009–2010	FC Erzgebirge Aue	36	(1)
2010–	Wormatia Worms	40	(1)

International career
1999–2001	Germany U-21	30	(0)
- * Club domestic league appearances and goals

Marco Stark (born July 9, 1981 in Worms, Germany) is a German football player currently playing for Wormatia Worms.
