= Georg Koch =

German footballer (1972–2026)

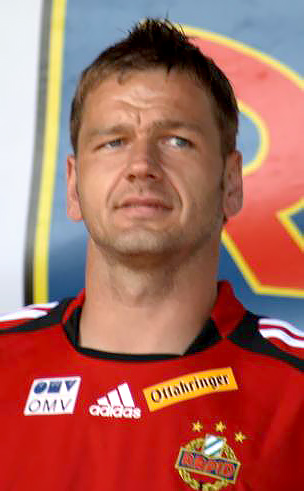
- Koch in 2008

Personal information
- Date of birth: 3 February 1972
- Place of birth: Bergisch Gladbach, North Rhine-Westphalia, West Germany
- Date of death: 4 March 2026 (aged 54)
- Height: 1.93 m (6 ft 4 in)
- Position: Goalkeeper

Youth career
- VfR Marienfeld 1946

Senior career*
Years	Team	Apps	(Gls)
1990–1991	SpVgg Erkenschwick		
1992–1997	Fortuna Düsseldorf	131	(0)
1997	PSV	3	(0)
1997–2000	Arminia Bielefeld	72	(0)
2000–2003	1. FC Kaiserslautern	85	(0)
2003	1. FC Kaiserslautern II	3	(0)
2003–2004	Energie Cottbus	26	(0)
2004–2007	MSV Duisburg	93	(0)
2007–2008	Dinamo Zagreb	25	(0)
2008–2009	Rapid Wien	7	(0)
Total		445	(0)
- * Club domestic league appearances and goals

Georg Koch (3 February 1972 – 4 March 2026) was a German professional footballer who played as a goalkeeper.

== Career ==
Born in Bergisch Gladbach, Koch started his career playing at amateur club SpVgg Erkenschwick before becoming a professional in January 1992, when he moved to the Bundesliga with Fortuna Düsseldorf. He was only understudy to firmly established Jörg Schmadtke in his first months, making no appearances.

After Fortuna was relegated with a 20th-place finish, Koch eventually became the club's first choice, helping it return to the top division in 1994–95, and continued in that position in the following years; he made his debut in the competition on 11 August 1995, at Werder Bremen.

In June 1997, shortly after another top flight relegation, Koch agreed terms with PSV Eindhoven, but spent only three months with the Dutch club and returned to Germany in October 1997, signing with Arminia Bielefeld, where he played a further two-and-a-half campaigns, with one relegation and one promotion.

During the 2000 winter break, Koch left for 1. FC Kaiserslautern and became the club's first-choice goalkeeper in March 2000, after spending six matches as understudy to Uwe Gospodarek. He went on to make nine league appearances throughout the final eleven matchdays of the season and remained first choice in the following two seasons, but lost his position to the young Tim Wiese in early 2003, and left the club at the end of that season. In August 2003, Koch signed with Energie Cottbus, which competed in the second division at the time, and subsequently made 26 appearances for the club in the league before moving to another second-tier club, MSV Duisburg, in June 2004, on a five-year contract.

He made 67 out of possible 68 league appearances in his first two seasons with Duisburg, only missing one match in 2004–05 through suspension after collecting five yellow cards, as the club were promoted to the Bundesliga. Duisburg were relegated again after just one season.

Koch cancelled his contract with Duisburg in late June 2007 and went to join Croatian first-division side Dinamo Zagreb on a free transfer in early July, signing a two-year contract. He made his competitive debut for Dinamo on 17 July, in the club's first Champions League qualifier, in Azerbaijan against Khazar Lankaran, which ended in a 1–1 draw.

Despite the fact that he only spent one season with Dinamo, Koch received large amounts of praise from the fans due to his incredible charisma after only a few months of playing for the club, with many of them seeing him as the future captain. However, Dinamo decided to re-sign their former player Tomislav Butina for the 2008–09 season, and Koch was eventually sold to Rapid Wien, in July 2008.

At Rapid, Koch started the season as first-choice, deputising for injured Helge Payer. However, in the derby against Austria Wien on 24 August 2008, he was severely injured after a firecracker, thrown from the stand with the travelling Austria supporters behind his goal, exploded in his proximity. Koch had to be substituted and it was later reported that he had suffered hearing damage and shock. In late September 2008, he was quoted saying in an Austrian newspaper that he still was experiencing problems with his balance as a result of the incident.

Koch announced his retirement on 18 March 2009, stating that he recognized there was no point carrying on playing as he was still suffering problems of hearing and balance following the accident. On 7 September 2009, he came out of retirement, joining seventh-tier club SC Herford, and playing his first match against SC Verl II; in November, however, only two months after, he retired for the second and final time.

== Death ==
Koch died of pancreatic cancer on 4 March 2026, at the age of 54.

== Career statistics ==
=== Club ===
Appearances and goals by club, season and competition
Club	Season	League			National cup		Europe		Other		Total	
Club	Season	Division	Apps	Goals	Apps	Goals	Apps	Goals	Apps	Goals	Apps	Goals
Fortuna Düsseldorf	1992–93	2. Bundesliga	13	0	0	0	—		—		13	0
Fortuna Düsseldorf	1992–93	Oberliga Nordrhein	29	0	1	0	—		—		30	0
Fortuna Düsseldorf	1994–95	2. Bundesliga	33	0	0	0	—		—		33	0
Fortuna Düsseldorf	1995–96	Bundesliga	34	0	5	0	—		—		39	0
Fortuna Düsseldorf	1996–97	Bundesliga	22	0	1	0	—		—		23	0
Fortuna Düsseldorf	Total		131	0	7	0	—		—		138	0
PSV	1997–98	Eredivisie	3	0	—		0 (Note: Appearance(s) in UEFA Champions League)	0	1 (Note: Appearance(s) in Johan Cruyff Shield)	0	4	0
Arminia Bielefeld	1997–98	Bundesliga	22	0	1	0	—		—		23	0
Arminia Bielefeld	1998–99	2. Bundesliga	34	0	2	0	—		—		36	0
Arminia Bielefeld	1999–2000	Bundesliga	16	0	0	0	—		—		16	0
Arminia Bielefeld	Total		72	0	3	0	—		—		75	0
1. FC Kaiserslautern	1999–2000	Bundesliga	9	0	—		—		—		9	0
1. FC Kaiserslautern	2000–01	Bundesliga	31	0	1	0	11 (Note: Appearance(s) in UEFA Cup)	0	2 (Note: Appearance(s) in Ligapokal)	0	45	0
1. FC Kaiserslautern	2001–02	Bundesliga	32	0	3	0	—		—		35	0
1. FC Kaiserslautern	2002–03	Bundesliga	13	0	2	0	2 (Note: Appearance(s) in Intertoto Cup)	0	—		17	0
1. FC Kaiserslautern	Total		85	0	6	0	13	0	2	0	106	0
1. FC Kaiserslautern II	2002–03	Regionalliga Süd	3	0	—		—		—		3	0
Energie Cottbus	2003–04	2. Bundesliga	26	0	0	0	—		—		26	0
MSV Duisburg	2004–05	2. Bundesliga	33	0	2	0	—		—		35	0
MSV Duisburg	2005–06	Bundesliga	34	0	1	0	—		—		35	0
MSV Duisburg	2006–07	2. Bundesliga	26	0	3	0	—		—		29	0
MSV Duisburg	Total		93	0	6	0	—		—		99	0
Dinamo Zagreb	2007–08	Prva HNL	25	0	3	0	12 (Note: Six appearances in UEFA Champions League, six appearances in UEFA Cup)	0	—		40	0
Rapid Wien	2008–09	Austrian Bundesliga	7	0	0	0	2 (Note: Appearance(s) in UEFA Champions League)	0	—		9	0
Career total			445	0	25	0	27	0	3	0	500	0

== Honours ==
PSV

- Johan Cruyff Shield: 1997
