= 1990–91 1. FC Kaiserslautern season =

1. FC Kaiserslautern
1990–91 season
- Manager: Karl-Heinz Feldkamp
- Bundesliga: 1st
- DFB-Supercup: Runners-up
- DFB-Pokal: Second round
- Cup Winners' Cup: First round
- UEFA Intertoto Cup: Group stage
- Top goalscorer: League: Stefan Kuntz (11 goals); All: Stefan Kuntz (15 goals)

In the 1990–91 German football season, Kaiserslautern won its first ever Bundesliga title.

== Squad ==
Goalkeepers

- (Germany) Gerry Ehrmann
- (Germany) Michael Serr

Defenders

- (Czech Republic) Miroslav Kadlec
- (Socialist Federal Republic of Yugoslavia) Elvis Hajradinovic
- (Germany) Joachim Stadler
- (Germany) Roger Lutz
- (Germany) Kay Friedmann
- (Germany) Reinhard Stumpf
- (United States) Thomas Dooley
- (Germany) Markus Kranz

Midfielders

- (Germany) Axel Roos
- (Germany) Marco Haber
- (Germany) Thomas Richter
- (Germany) Thomas Renner
- (Germany) Christian Wieczek
- (Denmark) Bjarne Goldbaek
- (Germany) Uwe Scherr
- (Germany) Frank Lelle
- (Germany) Markus Schupp
- (Germany) Guido Hoffmann
- (Germany) Rainer Ernst
- (Germany) Kai Krämer
- (Germany) Robby Zimmermann

Attackers

- (Germany) Bruno Labbadia
- (Germany) Bernhard Winkler
- (Germany) Stefan Kuntz
- (Socialist Federal Republic of Yugoslavia) Demir Hotić

=== DFB-Supercup ===
31 July 1990 Final	Bayern Munich	4–1	1. FC Kaiserslautern	Karlsruhe
	Reuter 6'; Kohler 19'; Bender 28'; Strunz 45'		Kuntz 62'	Stadium: Wildparkstadion; Attendance: 27,000; Referee: Hans-Jürgen Weber

=== Bundesliga ===
==== League table ====
Pos	Team	Pld	W	D	L	GF	GA	GD	Pts	Qualification or relegation
1	1. FC Kaiserslautern (C)	34	19	10	5	72	45	+27	48	Qualification to European Cup first round
2	Bayern Munich	34	18	9	7	74	41	+33	45	Qualification to UEFA Cup first round (Note: As Werder Bremen qualified for the Cup Winners' Cup, their UEFA-Cup place was transferred to Stuttgart.)
3	Werder Bremen	34	14	14	6	46	29	+17	42	Qualification to Cup Winners' Cup first round
4	Eintracht Frankfurt	34	15	10	9	63	40	+23	40	Qualification to UEFA Cup first round
5	Hamburger SV	34	16	8	10	60	38	+22	40	Qualification to UEFA Cup first round

Source: www.dfb.de
Rules for classification: 1) points; 2) goal difference; 3) number of goals scored.
The league expanded to 20 teams for the 1991–92 season because of the integration of the two best East German Oberliga teams due to German reunification.
(C) Champions

==== Matches ====
11 August 1990 1	Hamburger SV	1–3	1. FC Kaiserslautern	Volksparkstadion, Hamburg
	Furtok 56' (pen.)		Ernst 17' (pen.); Lelle 75'; Kuntz 76'	Attendance: 23,600; Referee: Michael Prengel

18 August 1990 2	1. FC Kaiserslautern	1–1	Eintracht Frankfurt	Fritz-Walter-Stadion, Kaiserslautern
	Kadlec 31'		Gründel 56'	Attendance: 30,500; Referee: Georg Dardenne

24 August 1990 3	Borussia Dortmund	0–2	1. FC Kaiserslautern	Westfalenstadion, Dortmund
			Helmer 8' (o.g.); Hotić 84'	Attendance: 35,032; Referee: Wolf-Günter Wiesel

31 August 1990 4	1. FC Kaiserslautern	4–3	Hertha BSC	Fritz-Walter-Stadion, Kaiserslautern
	Lelle 23'; Hotić 32'; Kuntz 75', 85' (pen.)		Schlegel 22', 31' (pen.); Hotić 32'; Lünsmann 75'	Attendance: 28,019; Referee: Lothar Löwer

7 September 1990 5	Bayern Munich	4–0	1. FC Kaiserslautern	Munich Olympic Stadium, Munich
	Wohlfarth 43'; Dorfner 48'; Strunz 53'; Hotić 63' (o.g.)			Attendance: 27,000; Referee: Jürgen Aust

14 September 1990 6	1. FC Kaiserslautern	3–1	1. FC Nürnberg	Fritz-Walter-Stadion, Kaiserslautern
	Hotić 29', 32'; Lutz 59'		Roger Lutz 78' (o.g.)	Attendance: 25,512; Referee: Hans-Jürgen Kasper

22 September 1990 7	Bayer 05 Uerdingen	3–7	1. FC Kaiserslautern	Grotenburg-Stadion, Uerdingen
	Zietsch 29'; Fach 35'; Klauß 48'		Dooley 13'; Haber 22'; Hoffmann 32', 47'; Lelle 58'; Goldbaek 70'; Kuntz 84'	Attendance: 7,000; Referee: Rainer Boos

28 September 1990 8	1. FC Kaiserslautern	2–1	Bayer Leverkusen	Fritz-Walter-Stadion, Kaiserslautern
	Dooley 24'; Hotić 47'		Thom 81'	Attendance: 36,897; Referee: Hermann Albrecht

6 October 1990 9	FC St. Pauli	1–0	1. FC Kaiserslautern	Millerntor-Stadion, Hamburg
	Wolf 90'			Attendance: 17,000; Referee: Hans-Jürgen Weber

13 October 1990 10	1. FC Kaiserslautern	2–0	VfB Stuttgart	Fritz-Walter-Stadion, Kaiserslautern
	Dooley 28'; Goldbaek 52'			Attendance: 32,670; Referee: Klaus Broska

20 October 1990 11	Karlsruher SC	4–2	1. FC Kaiserslautern	BBBank Wildpark, Karlsruhe
	Hermann 3'; Reichert 20', 21'; Schütterle 44'		Rainer Ernst 41'; Kranz 42'	Attendance: 26,000; Referee: Hellmut Krug

27 October 1990 12	1. FC Kaiserslautern	1–1	Wattenscheid 09	Fritz-Walter-Stadion, Kaiserslautern
	Haber 29'		Hartmann 12'	Attendance: 28,599; Referee: Wolf-Rüdiger Umbach

10 November 1990 13	1. FC Kaiserslautern	0–0	Fortuna Düsseldorf	Fritz-Walter-Stadion, Kaiserslautern
				Attendance: 21,392; Referee: Wolf-Günter Wiesel

17 November 1990 14	VfL Bochum	0–2	1. FC Kaiserslautern	Vonovia Ruhrstadion, Bochum
			Stadler 55'; Guido Hoffman 62'	Attendance: 14,000; Referee: Aron Schmidhuber

24 November 1990 15	1. FC Kaiserslautern	1–0	Werder Bremen	Fritz-Walter-Stadion, Kaiserslautern
	Hoffmann 8'			Attendance: 33,704; Referee: Manfred Amerell

8 December 1990 16	Borussia Mönchengladbach	2–2	1. FC Kaiserslautern	Bökelberg, Mönchengladbach
	Criens 21', 53'		Labbadia 44', 60'	Attendance: 21,778; Referee: Manfred Neuner

23 February 1991 18	1. FC Kaiserslautern	1–0	Hamburger SV	Fritz-Walter-Stadion, Kaiserslautern
	Helmer 8' (o.g.)			Attendance: 26,197; Referee: Rainer Boos

2 March 1991 19	Eintracht Frankfurt	4–3	1. FC Kaiserslautern	Waldstadion, Frankfurt
	Möller 3', 27', 28'; Bein 51'		Hotić 7'; Kuntz 32' (pen.); Kadlec 73' (pen.)	Attendance: 30,000; Referee: Michael Prengel

9 March 1991 20	1. FC Kaiserslautern	2–2	Borussia Dortmund	Fritz-Walter-Stadion, Kaiserslautern
	Stumpf 44'; Winkler 80'		Gorlukovich 19'; Rummenigge 49'	Attendance: 29,821; Referee: Hans Scheuerer

16 March 1991 21	Hertha BSC	0–2	1. FC Kaiserslautern	Berlin Olympic Stadium, Berlin
			Hotić 2'; Kuntz 89'	Attendance: 15,634; Referee: Klaus Broska

19 March 1991 17	1. FC Kaiserslautern	2–2	1.FC Köln	Fritz-Walter-Stadion, Kaiserslautern
	Winkler 72'; Haber 80'		Heldt 4'; Sturm 24'	Attendance: 36,133; Referee: Eugen Strigel

23 March 1991 22	1. FC Kaiserslautern	2–1	Bayern Munich	Fritz-Walter-Stadion, Kaiserslautern
	Hotić 60'; Kuntz 85'		Wohlfarth 4'	Attendance: 38,500; Referee: Karl-Josef Assenmacher

2 April 1991 23	1. FC Nürnberg	1–4	1. FC Kaiserslautern	Max-Morlock-Stadion, Nuremberg
	Dittwar 34'		Labbadia 7', 26', 84'; Goldbaek 71'	Attendance: 30,400; Referee: Manfred Führer

6 April 1991 24	1. FC Kaiserslautern	2–0	Bayer Uerdingen	Fritz-Walter-Stadion, Kaiserslautern
	Hotić 43'; Labbadia 51'			Attendance: 30,223; Referee: Dieter Birlenbach

13 April 1991 25	Bayer Leverkusen	2–2	1. FC Kaiserslautern	BayArena, Leverkusen
	Rainer Ernst 10' (o.g.); Schreier 57'		Labbadia 52'; Schupp 90'	Attendance: 17,000; Referee: Wolf-Rüdiger Umbach

17 April 1991 26	1. FC Kaiserslautern	1–0	FC St. Pauli	Fritz-Walter-Stadion, Kaiserslautern
	Labbadia 82'			Attendance: 34,372; Referee: Manfred Neuner

20 April 1991 27	VfB Stuttgart	2–2	1. FC Kaiserslautern	Neckarstadion, Stuttgart
	Michael Frontzeck 33'; Hartmann 49'		Hoffmann 25'; Frontzeck 44' (o.g.)	Attendance: 43,000; Referee: Lothar Löwer

3 May 1991 28	1. FC Kaiserslautern	3–2	Karlsruher SC	Fritz-Walter-Stadion, Kaiserslautern
	Scherr 29'; Hoffmann 68'; Kuntz 90'		Scholl 7'; Schütterle 25'	Attendance: 37,714; Referee: Georg Dardenne

11 May 1991 29	SG Wattenscheid 09	0–0	1. FC Kaiserslautern	Lohrheidestadion, Wattenscheid
				Attendance: 15,000; Referee: Hermann Albrecht

18 May 1991 30	Fortuna Düsseldorf	0–0	1. FC Kaiserslautern	Rheinstadion, Düsseldorf
				Attendance: 32,000; Referee: Michael Malbranc

24 May 1991 31	1. FC Kaiserslautern	4–1	VfL Bochum	Fritz-Walter-Stadion, Kaiserslautern
	Kuntz 35', 66'; Goldbaek 45'; Scherr 61'		Dirk Helmig 16'	Attendance: 38,000; Referee: Karl-Heinz Tritschler

1 June 1991 32	Werder Bremen	1–2	1. FC Kaiserslautern	Weserstadion, Bremen
	Allofs 16'		Hoffmann 26'; Schupp 63'	Attendance: 31,500; Referee: Eugen Strigel

8 June 1991 33	1. FC Kaiserslautern	2–3	Borussia Mönchengladbach	Fritz-Walter-Stadion, Kaiserslautern
	Kranz 89' (pen.); Labbadia 90'		Kastenmaier 9', 20'; Wynhoff 82'	Attendance: 38,000; Referee: Wolf-Günter Wiesel

15 June 1991 34	1. FC Köln	2–6	1. FC Kaiserslautern	RheinEnergieStadion, Cologne
	Ordenewitz 34' (pen.); Greiner 47'		Haber 5', 77'; Winkler 14', 43'; Dooley 45'; Schupp 90'	Attendance: 54,364; Referee: Manfred Harder

=== DFB-Pokal ===
4 August 1990 First round	SV Südwest Ludwigshafen	1–7	1. FC Kaiserslautern	Südweststadion, Ludwigshafen am Rhein
			Ernst 8'; Hotić 31', 70', 85'; Kuntz 51', 90'; Schupp 64' (pen.)	Attendance: 5,000; Referee: Gerhard Theobald

3 November 1990 Second round	1. FC Kaiserslautern	1–2	1. FC Köln	Fritz-Walter-Stadion, Kaiserslautern
	Haber 41'		Greiner 22'; Banach 88'	Attendance: 26,428; Referee: Bodo Kriegelstein

== First round ==
19 September 1990 First leg	(Germany) 1. FC Kaiserslautern	1–0	(Italy) Sampdoria	Fritz-Walter-Stadion, Kaiserslautern
	Kuntz 75'			Attendance: 32,674; Referee: John Blankenstein

3 November 1990 Second leg	(Italy) Sampdoria	2–0 (2–1 agg.)	(Germany) 1. FC Kaiserslautern	Stadio Luigi Ferraris, Genoa
	Mancini 7' (pen.); Branca 76'			Attendance: 29,994; Referee: Neil Midgley

=== Intertoto Cup ===
Kaiserslautern 1–1 Bohemians 1905
Kaiserslautern 3–1 Malmo FC
Kaiserslautern 2–2 Energie Cottbus
Energie Cottbus 4–0 Kaiserslautern
Bohemians 1905 0–4 Kaiserslautern
Malmo FC 1–1 Kaiserslautern
