= 1991 DFB-Supercup final =

1991 DFB-Supercup Final
German Supercup
- Event: 1991 DFB-Supercup
1. FC Kaiserslautern	Werder Bremen
3	1
- Date: 6 August 1991
- Venue: Niedersachsenstadion, Hanover
- Referee: Wolf-Günter Wiesel (Ottbergen)
- Attendance: 8,000

The 1991 DFB-Supercup Final decided the winner of the 1991 edition of the DFB-Supercup, a football competition contested by the winners of the previous season's West German league and cup winners, along with the East German league and cup champions.

The match was played at the Niedersachsenstadion in Hanover, and contested by both West German teams, league champions 1. FC Kaiserslautern and cup winners Werder Bremen. Kaiserslautern won the match 3–1 for their first title.

== Teams ==
Team	Qualification for tournament	Previous appearances (bold indicates winners)
1. FC Kaiserslautern	1990–91 Bundesliga champions	1 (1990)
Werder Bremen	1990–91 DFB-Pokal winners	1 (**1988**)

== Route to the final ==
Both league champions of West and East Germany met in the first semi-final, before the cup winners met a day later to qualify for the final.

Note: In all results below, the score of the finalist is given first (N: neutral; A: away).

1. FC Kaiserslautern		Round	Werder Bremen
Opponent	Result	1991 DFB-Supercup	Opponent	Result
Hansa Rostock (A)	2–1	Semi-finals	Stahl Eisenhüttenstadt (N)	1–0

== Match ==
=== Details ===
6 August 1991

1. FC Kaiserslautern	3–1	Werder Bremen
Degen 27', 65'; Winkler 90'	Report	Rufer 88'

Niedersachsenstadion, Hanover
Attendance: 8,000
Referee: Wolf-Günter Wiesel (Ottbergen)

**1. FC Kaiserslautern**	**Werder Bremen**

GK	1	(Germany) Michael Serr
CM	2	(United States) Thomas Dooley	(substituted off) 68'
CB	3	(Germany) Oliver Schäfer
CB	4	(Germany) Axel Roos
RWB	5	(Germany) Frank Lelle
CM	6	(Germany) Guido Hoffmann
CF	7	(Germany) Jürgen Degen
LWB	8	(Denmark) Bjarne Goldbæk	(substituted off) 75'
CF	9	(Germany) Bernhard Winkler
AM	10	(Germany) Marco Haber
SW	11	(Germany) Stefan Kuntz (c)
Substitutes:
DF		(Germany) Wolfgang Funkel	(substituted on) 68'
MF		(Germany) Roger Lutz	(substituted on) 75'
Manager:
(Germany) Karl-Heinz Feldkamp

GK	1	(Germany) Oliver Reck
CB	2	(Germany) Thomas Schaaf (c)
LWB	3	(Germany) Thorsten Legat
CM	4	(Germany) Günter Hermann
SW	5	(Germany) Miroslav Votava
CB	6	(Germany) Uli Borowka
RWB	7	(Germany) Dieter Eilts
CM	8	(Germany) Marco Bode
CF	9	(Germany) Stefan Kohn	(substituted off) 46'
CF	10	(Germany) Kay Wenschlag	(substituted off) 46'
AM	11	(Germany) Klaus Allofs
Substitutes:
MF		(Germany) Uwe Harttgen	(substituted on) 46'
FW		(New Zealand) Wynton Rufer	(substituted on) 46'
Manager:
(Germany) Otto Rehhagel

== See also ==
- 1991–92 Bundesliga
- 1991–92 DFB-Pokal
