= 1986–87 1. FC Kaiserslautern season =

1. FC Kaiserslautern
1986-87 season
- Manager: Hannes Bongartz
- Stadium: Fritz-Walter-Stadion
- Bundesliga: 7th
- DFB-Pokal: First round
- Top goalscorer: League: Frank Hartmann (17 goals); All: Frank Hartmann (17 goals)

In the 1986–87 season, 1. FC Kaiserslautern ended in seventh place in the Bundesliga with 37 points. It was the club's 24th season in the top flight of German football.

== Squad ==
Note: Flags indicate national team as defined under FIFA eligibility rules; some limited exceptions apply. Players may hold more than one non-FIFA nationality.

No.	Pos.	Nation	Player
—	GK	GER	Gerald Ehrmann
—	GK	GER	Michael Serr
—	DF	GER	Michael Dusek
—	DF	GER	Kay Friedmann
—	DF	POL	Stefan Majewski
—	DF	GER	Gunther Metz
—	DF	GER	Hans-Werner Moser
—	DF	GER	Axel Roos
—	DF	GER	Wolfgang Wolf
—	MF	GER	Günter Drews
—	MF	GER	Jürgen Groh
—	MF	GER	Frank Hartmann
—	MF	GER	Frank Haun
—	MF	GER	Herbert Hoos
—	MF	GER	Frank Lelle
—	MF	GER	Patrik Mohr
—	MF	GER	Markus Schupp
—	MF	GER	Leo Spielberger
—	MF	GER	Wolfram Wuttke

No.	Pos.	Nation	Player
—	FW	GER	Sergio Allievi
—	FW	GER	Harald Kohr
—	FW	GER	Dieter Trunk

== Competitions ==
=== Bundesliga ===
==== League table ====
Pos	Team	Pld	W	D	L	GF	GA	GD	Pts	Qualification or relegation
5	Werder Bremen	34	17	6	11	65	54	+11	40	Qualification to UEFA Cup first round (Note: As Hamburger SV qualified for the Cup Winners' Cup, their UEFA Cup spot was transferred to Leverkusen.)
6	Bayer Leverkusen	34	16	7	11	56	38	+18	39	Qualification to UEFA Cup first round
7	1. FC Kaiserslautern	34	15	7	12	64	51	+13	37	
8	Bayer 05 Uerdingen	34	12	11	11	51	49	+2	35	
9	1. FC Nürnberg	34	12	11	11	62	62	0	35	

Source: www.dfb.de
Rules for classification: 1) points; 2) goal difference; 3) number of goals scored.

==== Matches ====
9 August 1986 1	SpVgg Blau-Weiß 1890 Berlin	1-4	Kaiserslautern	Olympiastadion, Berlin
		Report

16 August 1986 2	Kaiserslautern	1-1	Borussia Mönchengladbach	Fritz-Walter-Stadion, Kaiserslautern
15:30	Wuttke 65'	Report	Dreßen 26'	Attendance: 32,000; Referee: Rainer Jupe

22 August 1986 3	Werder Bremen	1-0	Kaiserslautern	Weserstadion, Bremen
		Report

3 September 1986 4	Kaiserslautern	4-1	VfL Bochum	Fritz-Walter-Stadion, Kaiserslautern
		Report

6 September 1986 5	Eintracht Frankfurt	2-2	Kaiserslautern	Waldstadion, Frankfurt
		Report

13 September 1986 6	Kaiserslautern	1-1	Bayern Munich	Fritz-Walter-Stadion, Kaiserslautern
		Report

20 September 1986 7	Bayer Leverkusen	1-0	Kaiserslautern	Ulrich-Haberland-Stadion, Leverkusen
		Report

27 September 1986 8	Kaiserslautern	3-2	Waldhof Mannheim	Fritz-Walter-Stadion, Kaiserslautern
		Report

4 October 1986 9	Homburg	1-1	Kaiserslautern	Waldstadion, Homburg
		Report

10 October 1986 10	Kaiserslautern	1-0	Bayer Uerdingen	Fritz-Walter-Stadion, Kaiserslautern
		Report

18 October 1986 11	VfB Stuttgart	1-1	Kaiserslautern	Neckarstadion, Stuttgart
		Report

1 November 1986 12	Kaiserslautern	5-1	Schalke 04	Fritz-Walter-Stadion, Kaiserslautern
		Report

7 November 1986 13	Borussia Dortmund	2-0	Kaiserslautern	Westfalenstadion, Dortmund
		Report

15 November 1986 14	Kaiserslautern	3-1	Fortuna Düsseldorf	Fritz-Walter-Stadion, Kaiserslautern

22 November 1986 15	Köln	2-2	Kaiserslautern	Müngersdorfer Stadion, Cologne
		Report

28 November 1986 16	Kaiserslautern	2-1	Nürnberg	Fritz-Walter-Stadion, Kaiserslautern
		Report

6 December 1986 17	Hamburg	2-0	Kaiserslautern	Volksparkstadion, Hamburg
		Report

21 February 1987 18	Kaiserslautern	2-0	SpVgg Blau-Weiß 1890 Berlin	Fritz-Walter-Stadion, Kaiserslautern
		Report

28 February 1987 19	Borussia Mönchengladbach	0-1	Kaiserslautern	Bökelbergstadion, Mönchengladbach
15:30		Report	Hartmann 16'	Attendance: 13,500; Referee: Manfred Neuner

13 March 1987 20	Kaiserslautern	1-3	Werder Bremen	Fritz-Walter-Stadion, Kaiserslautern
		Report

21 March 1983 21	VfL Bochum	3-1	Kaiserslautern	Ruhrstadion, Bochum
		Report

28 March 1987 22	Kaiserslautern	2-1	Eintracht Frankfurt	Fritz-Walter-Stadion, Kaiserslautern
		Report

4 April 1987 23	Bayern Munich	3-0	Kaiserslautern	Olympiastadion, Munich
		Report

11 April 1987 24	Kaiserslautern	1-1	Bayer Leverkusen	Fritz-Walter-Stadion, Kaiserslautern
		Report

15 April 1987 25	Waldhof Mannheim	4-3	Kaiserslautern	Südweststadion, Ludwigshafen
		Report

24 April 1987 26	Kaiserslautern	5-0	Homburg	Fritz-Walter-Stadion, Kaiserslautern
		Report

2 May 1987 27	Bayer Uerdingen	1-2	Kaiserslautern	Grotenburg-Stadion, Krefeld
		Report

9 May 1987 28	Kaiserslautern	3-0	Stuttgart	Fritz-Walter-Stadion, Kaiserslautern
		Report

16 May 1987 29	Schalke 04	3-2	Kaiserslautern	Parkstadion, Kaiserslautern
		Report

22 May 1987 30	Kaiserslautern	2-3	Borussia Dortmund	Fritz-Walter-Stadion, Kaiserslautern
		Report

30 May 1987 31	Fortuna Düsseldorf	1-3	Kaiserslautern	Rheinstadion, Düsseldorf
		Report

6 June 1987 32	Kaiserslautern	5-1	Köln	Fritz-Walter-Stadion, Kaiserslautern
		Report

13 June 1987 33	Nürnberg	2-1	Kaiserslautern	Frankenstadion, Nuremberg
		Report

17 June 1987 34	Kaiserslautern	0-4	Hamburg	Fritz-Walter-Stadion, Kaiserslautern
		Report
