= 1991–92 1. FC Nürnberg season =

1. FC Nürnberg
1991–92 season
- Manager: Willi Entenmann
- Stadium: Frankenstadion
- Bundesliga: 7th
- DFB-Pokal: Second round
- Top goalscorer: League: Dieter Eckstein (12); All: Dieter Eckstein (12)

The 1991–92 1. FC Nürnberg season was the 88th season in the club's history and the 7th consecutive season playing in the Bundesliga since promotion from 2. Bundesliga in 1985. Nürnberg finished seventh in the league.

The club also participated in the DFB-Pokal where it reached the semi-finals, losing in penalties to TSV Havelse.

== Competitions ==
=== Overview ===
Competition	First match	Last match	Starting round	Final position	Record							
Competition	First match	Last match	Starting round	Final position	Pld	W	D	L	GF	GA	GD	Win %
Bundesliga	3 August 1991	16 May 1992	Matchday 1	7th	38	18	7	13	54	51	+3	47.37
DFB-Pokal	17 August 1991	17 August 1991	Second round	Second round	1	0	1	0	1	1	+0	0.00
Total					39	18	8	13	55	52	+3	46.15

Source: Competitions

=== Bundesliga ===
3 August 1991 1	Hansa Rostock	4–0	1. FC Nürnberg	Rostock
15:30	Weichert 28', 51'; Sedláček 53'; Spies 90' (pen.)	Report		Stadium: Ostseestadion; Attendance: 13,000; Referee: Michael Malbranc

10 August 1991 2	1. FC Nürnberg	3–1	Fortuna Düsseldorf	Nürnberg
15:30	Eckstein 9'; Oechler 17'; Wück 87'	Report	Schreier 31' (pen.)	Stadium: Städtisches Stadion; Attendance: 22,000; Referee: Karl-Heinz Gläser

14 August 1991 3	Schalke 04	1–0	1. FC Nürnberg	Gelsenkirchen
20:00	Freund 8'	Report		Stadium: Parkstadion; Attendance: 41,200; Referee: Werner Föckler

20 August 1991 4	1. FC Nürnberg	1–1	Dynamo Dresden	Nürnberg
20:00	Wolf 61'	Report	Gütschow 54'	Stadium: Städtisches Stadion; Attendance: 30,700; Referee: Alfons Berg

25 August 1991 5	VfL Bochum	0–3	1. FC Nürnberg	Bochum
18:00		Report	Brunner 13'; Friedmann 22'; Eckstein 63'	Stadium: Ruhrstadion; Attendance: 16,000; Referee: Markus Merk

28 August 1991 6	1. FC Nürnberg	4–0	1. FC Köln	Nürnberg
20:00	Wagner 1'; Friedmann 28'; Zárate 29'; Eckstein 37'	Report		Stadium: Städtisches Stadion; Attendance: 40,000; Referee: Wolfgang Mierswa

31 August 1991 7	1. FC Kaiserslautern	3–0	1. FC Nürnberg	Kaiserslautern
15:30	Funkel 16' (pen.); Goldbæk 62'; Dooley 78'	Report		Stadium: Fritz-Walter-Stadion; Attendance: 28,944; Referee: Wieland Ziller

7 September 1991 8	1. FC Nürnberg	1–1	Hamburger SV	Nürnberg
15:30	Eckstein 53'	Report	von Heesen 49'	Stadium: Städtisches Stadion; Attendance: 35,000; Referee: Manfred Führer

14 September 1991 9	Eintracht Frankfurt	2–2	1. FC Nürnberg	Frankfurt
20:30	Bein 25'; Falkenmayer 34'	Report	Brunner 52'; Eckstein 75'	Stadium: Waldstadion; Attendance: 31,000; Referee: Bernd Heynemann

21 September 1991 10	1. FC Nürnberg	2–0	Stuttgarter Kickers	Nürnberg
15:30	Dittwar 58' (pen.); Eckstein 90'	Report		Stadium: Städtisches Stadion; Attendance: 25,500; Referee: Hans-Jürgen Weber

27 September 1991 11	1. FC Nürnberg	1–1	Bayern Munich	Nürnberg
20:00	Wück 80'	Report	Wohlfarth 72'	Stadium: Frankenstadion; Attendance: 52,500; Referee: Manfred Neuner

4 October 1991 12	Borussia Dortmund	3–2	1. FC Nürnberg	Dortmund
20:00	Chapuisat 36', 70'; Rummenigge 38' (pen.)	Report	Reinhardt 61' (o.g.); Friedmann 78'	Stadium: Westfalenstadion; Attendance: 37,197; Referee: Gerhard Theobald

11 October 1991 13	1. FC Nürnberg	4–3	VfB Stuttgart	Nürnberg
20:00	Eckstein 3', 44'; Oechler 54'; Wück 84'	Report	Walter 17'; Buchwald 65'; Frontzeck 69'	Stadium: Frankenstadion; Attendance: 46,000; Referee: Hartmut Strampe

18 October 1991 14	Borussia Mönchengladbach	1–0	1. FC Nürnberg	Mönchengladbach
20:00	Salou 27'	Report		Stadium: Bökelbergstadion; Attendance: 18,500; Referee: Hans-Joachim Osmers

25 October 1991 15	1. FC Nürnberg	3–1	SG Wattenscheid 09	Nürnberg
20:00	Eckstein 22'; Zietsch 32'; Wagner 82'	Report	Sané 70'	Stadium: Frankenstadion; Attendance: 30,000; Referee: Edgar Steinborn

2 November 1991 16	Bayer Leverkusen	0–1	1. FC Nürnberg	Leverkusen
15:30		Report	Wück 77'	Stadium: Ulrich-Haberland-Stadion; Attendance: 11,000; Referee: Klaus-Dieter Stenzel

8 November 1991 17	1. FC Nürnberg	1–1	MSV Duisburg	Nürnberg
20:00	Wagner 27'	Report	Nijhuis 53'	Stadium: Frankenstadion; Attendance: 46,000; Referee: Michael Malbranc

16 November 1991 18	Karlsruher SC	1–0	1. FC Nürnberg	Karlsruhe
15:30	Carl 65'	Report		Stadium: Wildparkstadion; Attendance: 17,000; Referee: Hellmut Krug

23 November 1991 19	1. FC Nürnberg	1–0	Werder Bremen	Nürnberg
15:30	Weidemann 30'	Report		Stadium: Frankenstadion; Attendance: 36,500; Referee: Karl-Josef Assenmacher

30 November 1991 20	1. FC Nürnberg	0–0	Hansa Rostock	Nürnberg
15:30		Report		Stadium: Frankenstadion; Attendance: 27,000; Referee: Jürgen Aust

6 December 1991 21	Fortuna Düsseldorf	1–2	1. FC Nürnberg	Düsseldorf
20:00	Schreier 50'	Report	Zárate 43'; Eckstein 57'	Stadium: Rheinstadion; Attendance: 8,000; Referee: Hans-Jürgen Kasper

14 December 1991 22	1. FC Nürnberg	0–1	Schalke 04	Nürnberg
15:30		Report	Christensen 46'	Stadium: Frankenstadion; Attendance: 47,000; Referee: Lutz Michael Fröhlich

7 February 1992 23	Dynamo Dresden	1–2	1. FC Nürnberg	Dresden
20:00	Gütschow 3'	Report	Wück 59'; Golke 83'	Stadium: Rudolf-Harbig-Stadion; Attendance: 13,000; Referee: Karl-Heinz Gläser

14 February 1992 24	1. FC Nürnberg	1–0	VfL Bochum	Nürnberg
20:00	Golke 90'	Report		Stadium: Frankenstadion; Attendance: 23,500; Referee: Günther Habermann

22 February 1992 25	1. FC Köln	4–0	1. FC Nürnberg	Cologne
15:30	Giske 22'; Ordenewitz 31', 44'; Baumann 79'	Report		Stadium: Müngersdorfer Stadion; Attendance: 16,000; Referee: Wieland Ziller

29 February 1992 26	1. FC Nürnberg	3–2	1. FC Kaiserslautern	Nürnberg
15:30	Golke 8', 73'; Heidenreich 11'	Report	Kuntz 54'; Vogel 88'	Stadium: Frankenstadion; Attendance: 32,500; Referee: Bernd Heynemann

8 March 1992 27	Hamburger SV	0–2	1. FC Nürnberg	Hamburg
19:00		Report	Zietsch 15'; Eckstein 52'	Stadium: Volksparkstadion; Attendance: 15,000; Referee: Georg Dardenne

13 March 1992 28	1. FC Nürnberg	1–3	Eintracht Frankfurt	Nürnberg
20:00	Zárate 44'	Report	Yeboah 46'; Andersen 50'; Roth 90'	Stadium: Frankenstadion; Attendance: 49,000; Referee: Klaus-Dieter Stenzel

21 March 1992 29	Stuttgart Kickers	3–1	1. FC Nürnberg	Stuttgart
15:30	Marin 12', 69', 88' (pen.)	Report	Dorfner 78'	Stadium: Neckarstadion; Attendance: 8,500; Referee: Michael Prengel

28 March 1992 30	Bayern Munich	1–3	1. FC Nürnberg	Munich
15:30	Mazinho 2'	Report	Wück 18'; Zárate 42' (pen.)	Stadium: Olympiastadion; Attendance: 55,000; Referee: Karl-Josef Assenmacher

3 April 1992 31	1. FC Nürnberg	2–1	Borussia Dortmund	Nürnberg
20:00	Zárate 11' (pen.); Wück 28'	Report	Chapuisat 34'	Stadium: Frankenstadion; Attendance: 48,500; Referee: Hans-Jürgen Kasper

11 April 1992 32	VfB Stuttgart	2–0	1. FC Nürnberg	Stuttgart
15:30	Sammer 22', 35'	Report		Stadium: Neckarstadion; Attendance: 44,000; Referee: Hellmut Krug

18 April 1992 33	1. FC Nürnberg	2–1	Borussia Mönchengladbach	Nürnberg
15:30	Zárate 44' (pen.), 79'	Report	Criens 48'	Stadium: Frankenstadion; Attendance: 43,000; Referee: Michael Malbranc

24 April 1992 34	SG Wattenscheid 09	1–1	1. FC Nürnberg	Bochum-Wattenscheid
20:00	Neuhaus 56'	Report	Eckstein 32'	Stadium: Lohrheidestadion; Attendance: 6,700; Referee: Hans-Peter Dellwing

1 May 1992 35	1. FC Nürnberg	1–0	Bayer Leverkusen	Nuremberg
20:00	Wagner 57'	Report		Stadium: Frankenstadion; Attendance: 47,300; Referee: Markus Merk

5 May 1992 36	MSV Duisburg	3–0	1. FC Nürnberg	Duisburg
19:30	Lyutyi 10', 86'; Hopp 80'	Report		Stadium: Wedaustadion; Attendance: 14,500; Referee: Edgar Steinborn

9 May 1992 37	1. FC Nürnberg	1–2	Karlsruher SC	Nuremberg
15:30	Wück 60'	Report	Scholl 75'; Krieg 86'	Stadium: Frankenstadion; Attendance: 36,000; Referee: Gerhard Theobald

16 May 1992 38	Werder Bremen	1–3	1. FC Nürnberg	Bremen
15:30	Kohn 38'	Report	Golke 59', 70', 75'	Stadium: Weser-Stadion; Attendance: 20,776; Referee: Jürgen Aust

=== DFB Pokal ===
17 August 1991 Second round	TSV Havelse	1–1 (a.e.t.) (4–2 p)	1. FC Nürnberg	Garbsen
15:30	Meves 57'	Report	Wolf 44'	Stadium: TSV-Kampfbahn; Attendance: 3,500; Referee: Hans-Joachim Osmers

== Statistics ==
=== Squad statistics ===
No.	Pos	Nat	Player	Total		Bundesliga		DFB-Pokal	
No.	Pos	Nat	Player	Apps	Goals	Apps	Goals	Apps	Goals
	GK	(Germany) GER	Andreas Köpke	38	0	37	0	1	0
	GK	(Germany) GER	Kurt Kowarz	1	0	1	0	0	0
	DF	(Germany) GER	Thomas Brunner	27	2	26	2	1	0
	DF	(Germany) GER	Jörg Dittwar	35	1	35	1	0	0
	DF	(Germany) GER	Kay Friedmann	37	3	36	3	1	0
	DF	(Germany) GER	Hans-Jürgen Heidenreich	14	1	14	1	0	0
	DF	(Germany) GER	Marco Kurz	19	0	18	0	1	0
	DF	(Germany) GER	Joachim Philipkowski	2	0	2	0	0	0
	DF	(Germany) GER	Uwe Wolf	17	2	16	1	1	1
	DF	(Germany) GER	Rainer Zietsch	37	2	36	2	1	0
	MF	(Germany) GER	Markus Bäurle	5	0	5	0	0	0
	MF	(Germany) GER	Hans Dorfner	18	1	18	1	0	0
	MF	(Germany) GER	Günter Drews	3	0	2	0	1	0
	MF	(Germany) GER	Dirk Fengler	23	0	22	0	1	0
	MF	(Germany) GER	André Golke	39	7	38	7	1	0
	MF	(Germany) GER	Marc Oechler	39	2	38	2	1	0
	MF	(Germany) GER	Martin Wagner	34	4	33	4	1	0
	MF	(Germany) GER	Uwe Weidemann	10	1	9	1	1	0
	FW	(Germany) GER	Dieter Eckstein	37	12	36	12	1	0
	FW	(Germany) GER	Christian Wück	32	8	32	8	0	0
	FW	(Argentina) ARG	Sergio Zárate	31	8	31	8	0	0
