= Guido Hoffmann =

German footballer (born 1965)

Personal information
- Date of birth: 20 December 1965 (age 60)
- Place of birth: Lindlar, Germany
- Height: 1.79 m (5 ft 10 in)
- Position: Midfielder

Senior career*
Years	Team	Apps	(Gls)
1985–1988	Borussia Mönchengladbach	10	(0)
1988–1990	FC Homburg	58	(5)
1990–1992	1. FC Kaiserslautern	57	(9)
1993	Bayer Leverkusen	18	(2)
1994–1997	VfB Leipzig	73	(8)
1997–1998	Omonia	21	(5)
1998–1999	Waldhof Mannheim	12	(1)
Total		249	(30)

Managerial career
- 2007–2009: Energie Cottbus (assistant)
- 2012: 1. FC Kaiserslautern II
- 2014–2015: SVN Zweibrücken
- 2015–2016: 1. FC Kaiserslautern II
- 2017–2018: Beijing Sport University II
- 2018: Hebei Zhuoao II
- 2019: Hebei Zhuoao
- 2021: Xanthi (assistant)
- 2022–2024: ZED FC (youth trainer)
- 2024–: Al-Fateh U19
- 2024: Al-Fateh (caretaker)
- * Club domestic league appearances and goals

Guido Hoffmann (born 20 December 1965) is a German football coach and a former player.

Hoffmann was named manager at SVN Zweibrücken in October 2014.

== Honours ==
1. FC Kaiserslautern

- Bundesliga: 1990–91
- DFL-Supercup: 1991

Bayer Leverkusen

- DFB-Pokal: 1992–93
