= Bjarne Goldbæk =

Danish footballer (born 1968)

Personal information
- Date of birth: 6 October 1968 (age 58)
- Place of birth: Copenhagen, Denmark
- Height: 1.80 m (5 ft 11 in)
- Position: Attacking midfielder

Youth career
- –1987: B 1901

Senior career*
Years	Team	Apps	(Gls)
1987	Næstved IF	17	(4)
1987–1989	Schalke 04	74	(8)
1989–1993	1. FC Kaiserslautern	80	(11)
1993–1994	Tennis Borussia Berlin	24	(5)
1994–1996	1. FC Köln	30	(2)
1996–1998	Copenhagen	74	(16)
1998–2000	Chelsea	29	(5)
2000–2003	Fulham	85	(6)
2003–2005	Rot-Weiss Essen	61	(9)
Total		474	(56)

International career
1987–1988	Denmark U-21	5	(0)
1987–2001	Denmark	28	(0)
Medal record
Men's football
Representing Denmark
CONMEBOL–UEFA Cup of Champions
Runner-up	1993 Argentina
- * Club domestic league appearances and goals

Bjarne Goldbæk (Danish pronunciation: [ˈpjɑː.nə ˈɡɔlˌpɛɡ]; born 6 October 1968) is a Danish former professional footballer and current sports pundit for Eurosport. An attacking midfielder, he played for a number of foreign clubs, including Chelsea and Fulham in England and several clubs in Germany. He most prominently won the 1990 German Cup tournament and 1990–91 Bundesliga championship with 1. FC Kaiserslautern. For the Denmark national team, Goldbæk was capped 28 times, and he was a part of the Danish squads for the 1998 FIFA World Cup and UEFA Euro 2000 tournaments.

He works as a football agent, and as an occasional football commentator on Eurosport during Bundesliga matches.

== Club career ==
Born in Copenhagen, Goldbæk started his career with Danish club B 1901, before he was snapped up by the top-flight Danish 1st Division club Næstved IF in 1987. He quickly moved abroad to play for Schalke 04 of the Bundesliga in September that year. In December 1989, Goldbæk changed clubs to Bundesliga rivals 1. FC Kaiserslautern, where he won the German Bundesliga championship in the 1990–91 season. He further played for Tennis Borussia Berlin and 1. FC Köln in Germany, before returning to Denmark to play for F.C. Copenhagen in 1996.

At F.C. Copenhagen, he quickly became a mainstay in the team, and he was awarded the 1998 F.C. Copenhagen Player of the Year award. Following good displays and a goal scored in two UEFA Cup Winners' Cup matches against Chelsea, he joined them in November 1998 for a fee of £330,000, in a deal that sent fellow Dane Brian Laudrup from Chelsea to Copenhagen. Goldbæk originally made a big impression when he moved to Stamford Bridge, but was not in favour with Chelsea's manager Gianluca Vialli, who tried to off-load him to Birmingham City and Nottingham Forest. He struggled to hold down a regular rotation place at Chelsea, before Fulham snatched him from Chelsea in January 2000, at the cost of £650,000. He made his Fulham debut in January 2000, a 1–0 home defeat at the hands of Grimsby Town. However, he soon became an important player, as Fulham won the English First Division crown in the 2000–01 season. As Fulham manager Jean Tigana's team strengthened, it appeared Goldbæk's future was becoming bleak at the club. He made just 17 appearances in the 2001–02 season. However, he started the next campaign in the picture, as he came on as a substitute in the Intertoto Cup game against FC Haka from Finland in early July 2002. As a result, Goldbæk would sign a one-year contract extension.

He left Fulham to play for Regionalliga club Rot-Weiss Essen in 2003. Goldbæk justified his move by stating that he had moved with his family into a house located in the nearby town of Gladbeck, and the support Rot-Weiss Essen commanded by regularly having 10.000 spectators at their home games . He was the team captain when the club earned promotion to the 2. Bundesliga in 2004, but as Rot-Weiss Essen were relegated to the Regionalliga again the following year, Goldbæk retired his active career in summer 2005.

== International career ==
Goldbæk made his debut for the Denmark national team on 18 November 1987, in a 1988 Olympic Games qualifier against the West Germany Olympic national team, which ended in a 1–0 defeat.

== After retirement ==
Goldbæk works as a licensed consultant for players and coaches.

== Career statistics ==
=== Club ===
Appearances and goals by club, season and competition
Club	Season	League			National cup (Note: Includes DFB-Pokal, Danish Cup, FA Cup)		League cup (Note: Includes Football League Cup)		Continental		Other		Total	
Club	Season	Division	Apps	Goals	Apps	Goals	Apps	Goals	Apps	Goals	Apps	Goals	Apps	Goals
Næstved IF	1987	Danish 1st Division	17	4			–		–		–		17	4
Schalke 04	1987–88	Bundesliga	22	3	4	2	–		–		–		26	5
Schalke 04	1988–89	2. Bundesliga	33	2	0	0	–		–		–		33	2
Schalke 04	1989–90	2. Bundesliga	19	3	1	1	–		–		–		20	4
Schalke 04	Total		74	8	5	3	–		–		–		79	11
1. FC Kaiserslautern	1989–90	Bundesliga	3	0	1	0	–		–		–		4	0
1. FC Kaiserslautern	1990–91	Bundesliga	22	4	1	0	–		1 (Note: Appearances in UEFA Cup Winners' Cup)	0	–		24	4
1. FC Kaiserslautern	1991–92	Bundesliga	24	2	2	0	–		3 (Note: Appearances in UEFA Champions League)	1	1 (Note: Appearance in DFB-Supercup)	0	30	3
1. FC Kaiserslautern	1992–93	Bundesliga	28	5	1	0	–		5 (Note: Appearances in UEFA Cup)	0	–		34	5
1. FC Kaiserslautern	1993–94	Bundesliga	3	0	–		–		–		–		3	0
1. FC Kaiserslautern	Total		80	11	5	0	–		9	1	1	0	95	12
Tennis Borussia Berlin	1993–94	2. Bundesliga	24	5	3	0	–		–		–		27	5
1. FC Köln	1994–95	Bundesliga	14	0	2	0	–		–		–		16	0
1. FC Köln	1995–96	Bundesliga	16	2	0	0	–		–		–		16	2
1. FC Köln	Total		30	2	2	0	–		–		–		32	2
Copenhagen	1996–97	Danish Superliga	32	7			–		3 (Note: Appearances in UEFA Intertoto Cup)	0	–		35	7
Copenhagen	1997–98	Danish Superliga	30	6			–		4	0	–		34	6
Copenhagen	1998–99	Danish Superliga	12	3			–		6	3	–		18	6
Copenhagen	Total		74	16			–		13	3	–		87	19
Chelsea	1998–99	Premier League	23	5	4	0	2	0	0	0	–		29	5
Chelsea	1999–2000	Premier League	6	0	0	0	1	0	2	0	–		9	0
Chelsea	Total		29	5	4	0	3	0	2	0	–		38	5
Fulham	1999–2000	First Division	18	3	1	0	0	0	–		–		19	3
Fulham	2000–01	First Division	43	2	1	0	0	0	–		–		44	2
Fulham	2001–02	Premier League	13	1	2	0	2	0	–		–		17	1
Fulham	2002–03	Premier League	10	0	3	1	1	0	6 (Note: Three appearances in UEFA Intertoto Cup, three appearances in UEFA Cup)	0	–		20	1
Fulham	Total		84	6	7	1	3	0	6	0	–		98	7
Rot-Weiss Essen	2003–04	Regionalliga	30	7	0	0	–		–		–		30	7
Rot-Weiss Essen	2004–05	2. Bundesliga	31	2	1	0	–		–		–		32	2
Career total			474	66	27	4	6	0	30	4	1	0	538	74

=== International ===
Appearances and goals by national team and year
National team	Year	Apps	Goals
Denmark	1987	1	0
Denmark	1988	0	0
Denmark	1989	0	0
Denmark	1990	0	0
Denmark	1991	3	0
Denmark	1992	1	0
Denmark	1993	3	0
Denmark	1994	0	0
Denmark	1995	0	0
Denmark	1996	2	0
Denmark	1997	0	0
Denmark	1998	2	0
Denmark	1999	9	0
Denmark	2000	5	0
Denmark	2001	2	0
Total		28	0

== Honours ==
1. FC Kaiserslautern

- Bundesliga: 1990–91
- DFB-Pokal: 1989–1990
- DFB-Supercup: 1991

FC Copenhagen

- Danish Cup: 1996–97

Fulham

- Football League First Division: 2000–01

Individual

- Copenhagen Player of the Year: 1998
