= Marco Haber =

German footballer

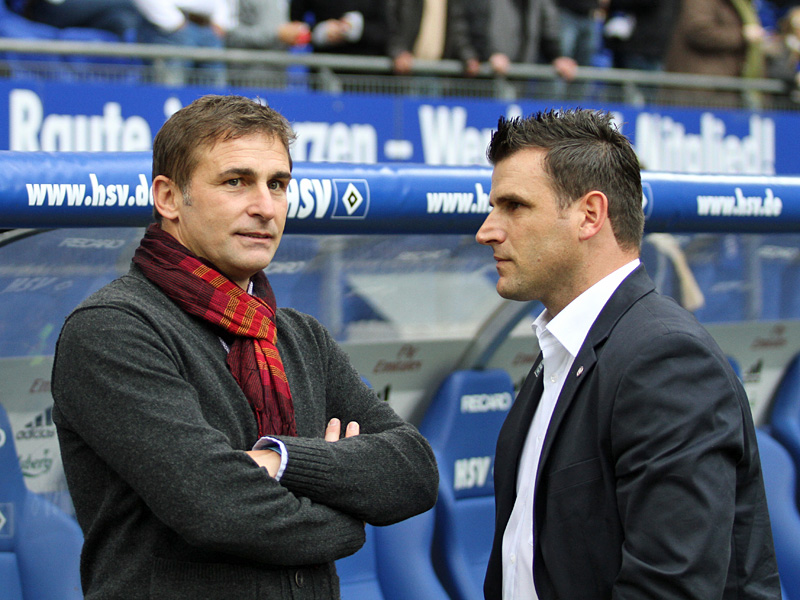
- Haber (right) with Stefan Kuntz

Personal information
- Date of birth: 21 September 1971 (age 55)
- Place of birth: Grünstadt, West Germany
- Height: 1.82 m (6 ft 0 in)
- Position: Midfielder

Team information
- Current team: 1. FC Kaiserslautern (team coordinator)

Youth career
- TV Kindenheim
- –1985: VfR Frankenthal
- 1985–1989: 1. FC Kaiserslautern

Senior career*
Years	Team	Apps	(Gls)
1989–1995	1. FC Kaiserslautern	139	(10)
1995–1998	VfB Stuttgart	76	(3)
1998–1999	Las Palmas	9	(0)
1999–2002	SpVgg Unterhaching	69	(2)
2002	Hansa Rostock	2	(0)
2002–2004	Omonia Nicosia	45	(0)
2004–2006	Anorthosis Famagusta	48	(1)
2006–2007	Nea Salamis	21	(0)
2007–2008	FSV Oggersheim	17	(0)
Total		386	(16)

International career
1990–1993	Germany U-21	23	(2)
1992	Germany Olympic	2	(0)
1995	Germany	2	(0)
Medal record
1. FC Kaiserslautern
Winner	DFB-Pokal	1990
Runner-up	DFB-Supercup	1990
Winner	Bundesliga	1991
Winner	DFB-Supercup	1991
VfB Stuttgart
Winner	DFB-Pokal	1997
Runner-up	DFB-Ligapokal	1997
Runner-up	UEFA Cup Winners' Cup	1998
- * Club domestic league appearances and goals

Marco Haber (born 21 September 1971) is a German former professional footballer who played as a midfielder.

== Playing career ==
Born in Grünstadt, Haber joined 1. FC Kaiserslautern at age 18, and made his first division debut shortly after, on 14 October 1989, playing the entire 1–1 draw at Bayer 04 Leverkusen. In the following season, he became an automatic first-choice, leading the side to the national championship, adding the runner-up position in 1993–94. He also played as they won the 1991 DFB-Supercup.

In 1995, Haber moved to VfB Stuttgart, where he was regularly used during three seasons, also helping win the 1997 domestic cup. In August and December of the year he joined, he was called for the national team for two friendlies against Belgium (2–1) and South Africa (0–0). In his last season, he played in eight matches (seven complete) as Stuttgart lost the Cup Winners' Cup to Chelsea FC.

After an unassuming spell in Spain's second division with UD Las Palmas, Haber returned to his country and signed for SpVgg Unterhaching, being a regular fixture in his first two years. 2001–02 was split between Unterhaching and FC Hansa Rostock, appearing very rarely in his six-month spell, as relegation was narrowly avoided.

Subsequently, Haber spent five years in the Cypriot league, first in Omonia Nicosia, winning one championship and one Supercup, then Anorthosis Famagusta FC (league champion in 2004–05) and Nea Salamis FC. In summer 2007, he moved back to Germany, playing one season in the Regionalliga Süd (third level) with FSV Oggersheim.

== Post-playing career ==
In the 2008–09 season, Haber was hired as sports director at FSV Oggersheim. He left the job at the end of the season.

After leaving FSV Oggersheim, Haber was appointed as new team coordinator at 1. FC Kaiserslautern.
