= Bernhard Winkler =

German footballer (born 1966)

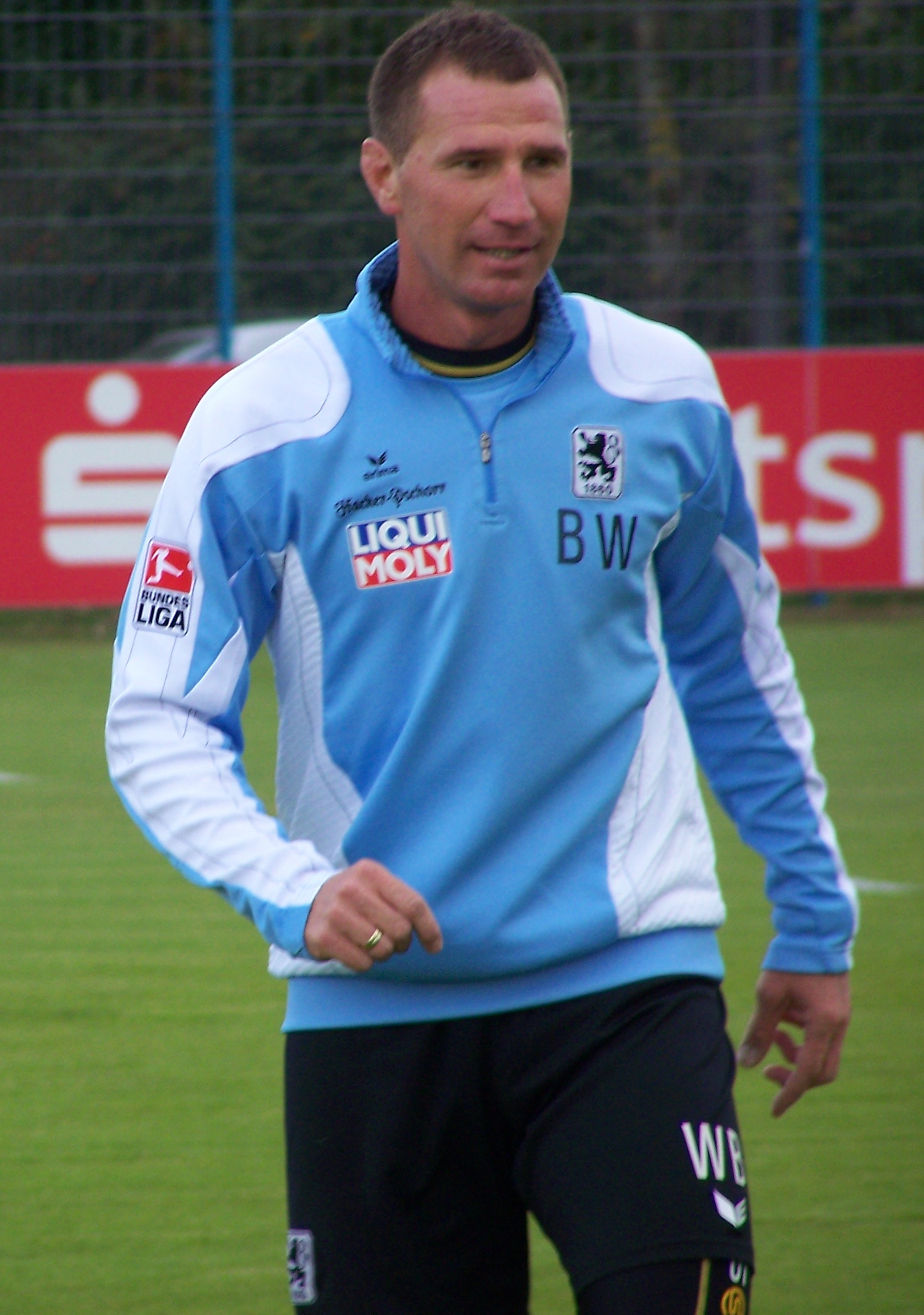
- Winkler in 2009

Personal information
- Date of birth: 24 June 1966 (age 60)
- Place of birth: Würzburg, West Germany
- Height: 1.83 m (6 ft 0 in)
- Position: Striker

Youth career
- SV Veitshöchheim

Senior career*
Years	Team	Apps	(Gls)
1985–1987	SV Heidingsfeld		
1987–1988	Türk Gücü München		
1988–1989	1. FC Eibelstadt		
1989–1990	1. FC Schweinfurt 05		
1990–1993	1. FC Kaiserslautern	16	(4)
1992	→ SG Wattenscheid 09 (loan)	12	(0)
1993	→ Fortuna Köln (loan)	7	(1)
1993–2002	1860 Munich	196	(79)

Managerial career
- 2005: FC Ismaning
- 2010–2011: 1860 Munich II
- * Club domestic league appearances and goals

Bernhard Winkler (born 24 June 1966) is a German former professional footballer who played as a striker. He is best known for his time with 1860 Munich.

== Honours ==
1. FC Kaiserslautern

- Bundesliga: 1990–91
- DFL-Supercup: 1991
