= Frank Lelle =

German former footballer

Personal information
- Date of birth: 4 February 1965 (age 61)
- Place of birth: Hermersberg, West Germany
- Height: 1.78 m (5 ft 10 in)
- Positions: Midfielder; defender

Team information
- Current team: 1. FC Kaiserslautern II (youth coordinator)

Senior career*
Years	Team	Apps	(Gls)
- FK Pirmasens
- SV Rodalben
1986–1993	1. FC Kaiserslautern	85	(8)
1993–1995	FC Homburg	28	(0)
- FK Pirmasens

Managerial career
- 1998–2000: FK Pirmasens
- 2000–2002: Karlsruher SC (assistant manager)
- 2003: SV Waldhof Mannheim (assistant manager)
- 2009: 1. FC Kaiserslautern II (caretaker)
- * Club domestic league appearances and goals

Frank Lelle (born 4 February 1965 in Hermersberg) is a German former football player.

== Honours ==
1. FC Kaiserslautern

- Bundesliga: 1990–91
- DFB-Pokal: 1989–90
- DFL-Supercup: 1991
