= Demir Hotić =

Bosnian footballer and manager

Personal information
- Date of birth: 9 July 1962 (age 64)
- Place of birth: Bosanski Novi, FPR Yugoslavia
- Height: 1.79 m (5 ft 10 in)
- Position: Striker

Youth career
- –1972: Sloboda Bosanski Brod
- 1972–1980: TuS Gerresheim
- 1980–1981: PSV Borussia Düsseldorf

Senior career*
Years	Team	Apps	(Gls)
1981–1983	Fortuna Düsseldorf		
1983–1987	Union Solingen	138	(32)
1987–1989	Stuttgarter Kickers	61	(20)
1989–1990	VfB Stuttgart	11	(3)
1990–1993	1. FC Kaiserslautern	100	(27)
1993	Fenerbahçe	4	(1)
1994	Stuttgarter Kickers	21	(1)
1994–1995	Yverdon-Sport FC	3	(0)

Managerial career
- 1997–1999: Wormatia Worms
- 1999–2000: 1. FC Kaiserslautern U19
- 2000–2002: Eintracht Bad Kreuznach
- 2002–2005: TuRu Düsseldorf
- 2007: Gençlerbirliği (assistant)
- 2008–2009: Željezničar
- 2010: Velež Mostar
- 2011–2012: Borussia Neunkirchen
- 2014: VfL 07 Neustadt
- * Club domestic league appearances and goals

Demir Hotić (born 9 July 1962) is a Bosnian retired professional footballer and former manager.

== Playing career ==
His most successful period was while he was playing in 1. FC Kaiserslautern, but he also played for SG Union Solingen, Stuttgarter Kickers and VfB Stuttgart in Germany, Fenerbahçe in Turkey and Yverdon-Sport FC in Switzerland.

== Managerial career ==
After finishing his playing career, he started managing in Germany where he first spent two seasons with Wormatia Worms.

Next, he was managing 1. FC Kaiserslautern's youth team, Eintracht Bad Kreuznach, TuRu Düsseldorf and had a short spell as assistant manager at Turkish Gençlerbirliği S.K.

He became manager of Željezničar on 30 December 2008. He stayed there only half a season and was replaced in the summer of 2009 by Amar Osim.

After Željezničar Hotić also managed Velež Mostar in 2010, Borussia Neunkirchen from December 2011 to February 2012 and Vfl 07 Neustadt from January 2014 to December 2014.

== Honours ==
=== Player ===
Stuttgarter Kickers

- 2. Bundesliga: 1988–89

1. FC Kaiserslautern

- Bundesliga: 1990–91
- DFB-Pokal: 1989–90
