= Thomas Richter (footballer, born 1967) =

German footballer and coach

Personal information
- Date of birth: 29 June 1967 (age 59)
- Place of birth: Hof, West Germany
- Height: 1.84 m (6 ft 0 in)
- Position: Midfielder

Senior career*
Years	Team	Apps	(Gls)
- ATS Hof/West
- VfB Helmbrechts
- FC Jeunesse Biwer
1990–1993	1. FC Kaiserslautern	21	(0)
1993–1996	Hertha BSC	73	(7)
1996–1997	SV Waldhof Mannheim	17	(1)
1997–1999	SV Eintracht Trier 05		

Managerial career
- 2008: SV Eintracht Trier 05 (caretaker)
- 2008–2010: SV Eintracht Trier 05 (assistant)
- * Club domestic league appearances and goals

Thomas Richter (born 29 June 1967 in Hof) is a German football coach and a former player.

== Honours ==
- Bundesliga: 1990–91
