= Jürgen Degen =

German footballer

Personal information
- Date of birth: 7 November 1967 (age 58)
- Place of birth: Hamburg, West Germany
- Height: 1.80 m (5 ft 11 in)
- Position: Forward

Youth career
- TuS Alstertal
- Bramfelder SV
- –1991: VfL 93 Hamburg

Senior career*
Years	Team	Apps	(Gls)
1991–1994	1. FC Kaiserslautern	19	(5)
1992–1993	→ Fortuna Düsseldorf (loan)	24	(2)
1994–1997	VfL 93 Hamburg		
1997–1999	Hannover 96	21	(9)
1999–2000	SV Meppen	48	(14)
2000–2001	TuS Dassendorf	31	(16)
2001–2002	Vorwärts-Wacker 04	25	(5)
2002–2003	Meiendorfer SV	29	(10)
2003–2005	HSV Barmbek-Uhlenhorst	49	(13)
2010	HSV Barmbek-Uhlenhorst	1	(0)
- * Club domestic league appearances and goals

Jürgen Degen (born 7 November 1967) is a German former footballer who played as a forward. He made 19 appearances in the Bundesliga for 1. FC Kaiserslautern. He scored twice as Kaiserslautern won the 1991 DFB-Supercup Final.

== Honours ==
- DFL-Supercup: 1991
