= Markus Kranz =

German footballer (born 1969)

Personal information
- Date of birth: 4 August 1969 (age 57)
- Place of birth: Speyer, West Germany
- Height: 1.74 m (5 ft 9 in)
- Positions: Defender; midfielder

Youth career
- FSV Schifferstadt
- 1. FC Kaiserslautern

Senior career*
Years	Team	Apps	(Gls)
1987–1992	1. FC Kaiserslautern	57	(6)
1992–1993	Bayer Uerdingen	27	(1)
1993–1996	Dynamo Dresden		
1995–1999	SC Fortuna Köln	81	(2)
1999–2001	BV Emmen		
2001–2002	VfR Mannheim	12	(0)
2002–2003	SC Fortuna Köln		
2003–2005	FC Junkersdorf		
2005–2006	VfL Rheinbach		

International career
	Germany U-21	10	(1)

Managerial career
- 2007–2008: Wacker Burghausen (assistant)
- * Club domestic league appearances and goals

Markus Kranz (born 4 August 1969 in Speyer) is a German football coach and a former player.

== Honours ==
1. FC Kaiserslautern

- Bundesliga: 1990–91
- DFB-Pokal: 1989–90
