= Miroslav Kadlec =

Czech footballer

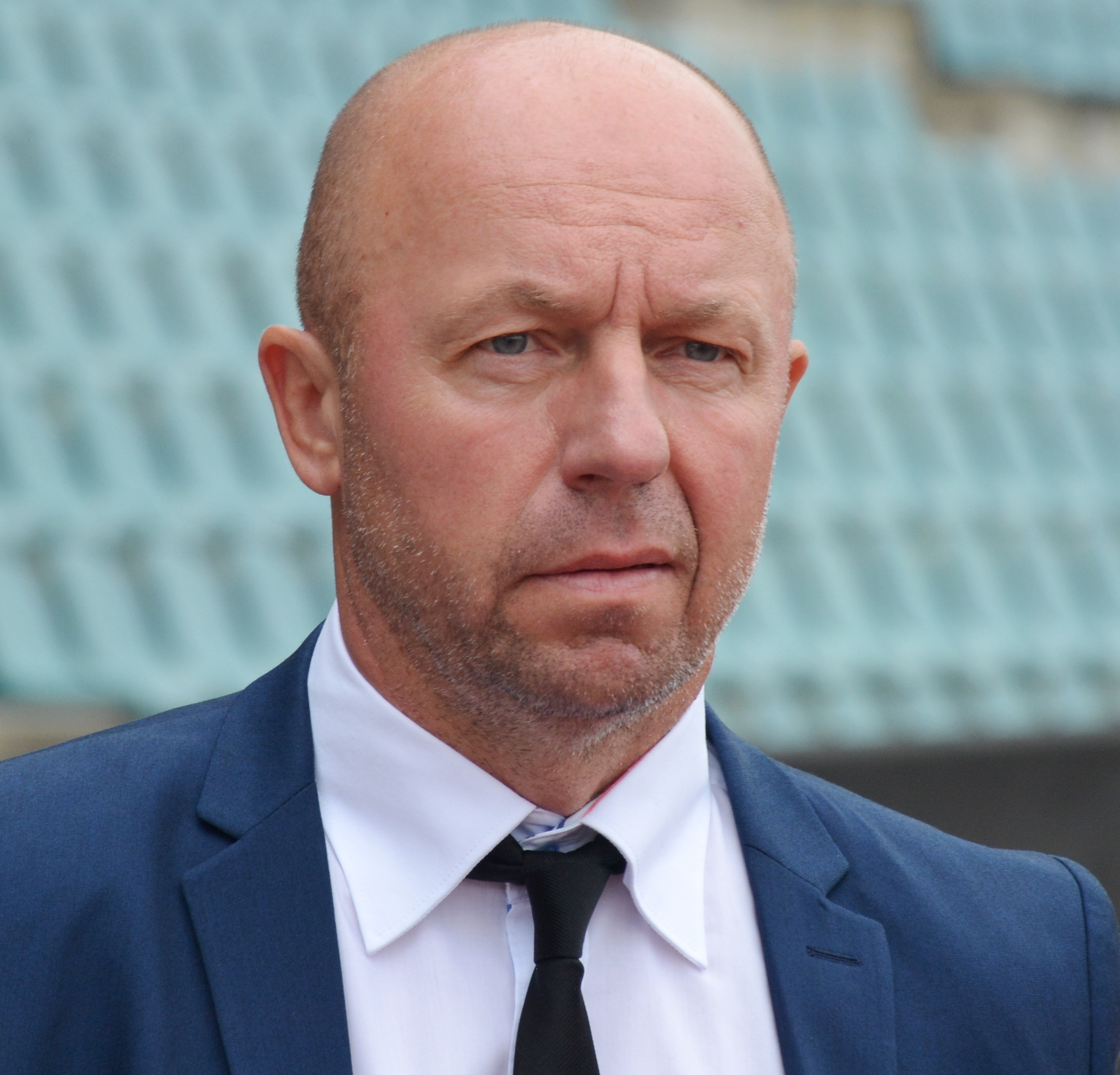
- Miroslav Kadlec in 2015

Personal information
- Date of birth: 22 June 1964 (age 62)
- Place of birth: Uherské Hradiště, Czechoslovakia
- Height: 1.85 m (6 ft 1 in)
- Positions: Sweeper; centre-back

Youth career
- 1971–1983: Slovácká Slavia Uherské Hradiště

Senior career*
Years	Team	Apps	(Gls)
1983–1984	TJ Vítkovice	26	(1)
1984–1986	RH Cheb	56	(2)
1986–1990	TJ Vítkovice	115	(19)
1990–1998	1. FC Kaiserslautern	234	(17)
1998–2001	FC Petra Drnovice	73	(2)
2001–2002	FC Zbrojovka Brno	24	(2)
Total		528	(43)

International career
1987–1993	Czechoslovakia	38	(1)
1994–1997	Czech Republic	26	(1)
Medal record
Men's football
Representing Czech Republic
UEFA European Championship
Runner-up	1996 England
- * Club domestic league appearances and goals

Miroslav Kadlec (born 22 June 1964) is a Czech former professional footballer who played as a defender. Either side of an eight-year spell playing in Germany for Kaiserslautern, Kadlec played for four Czech clubs. In an international career spanning from 1987 to 1997, Kadlec made 64 international appearances split between Czechoslovakia and the Czech Republic.

== Club career ==
Kadlec played in the Czechoslovak First League, making his debut in the 1983–84 season for Ostrava-based TJ Vítkovice. He had a spell at RH Cheb before returning to Vítkovice, from where he moved to Germany in 1990. Kadlec had an eight-year stint with German club 1. FC Kaiserslautern, where they were crowned Bundesliga champions in 1991 and 1998, the second straight out of the second division.

Kadlec returned to the Czech Republic 1998, spending three seasons with Petra Drnovice, before moving to FC Zbrojovka Brno in 2001. He made his club debut in a 0–5 away win on 23 June against local amateur side SK Řečkovice in front of a crowd of 900. Kadlec finished his professional career in May 2002, his last match being a 2–1 home defeat against Opava.

== International career ==
Kadlec played for Czechoslovakia and the Czech Republic, playing a total of 64 matches and scoring two goals. In April 1987, he debuted for the former national team during a UEFA Euro 1988 qualifying match against Wales, which ended in a 1–1 draw. Kadlec took part in the 1990 FIFA World Cup where he played the full minutes in the country's five matches. Six years later, he led the Czech national football team on its way to the UEFA Euro 1996, where the country won a silver medal. Kadlec missed only one game because of a two yellow card-suspension.

== Outside of football ==
Kadlec spends his free time playing golf. He is married with one son named Michal, who is also a former professional footballer.

== Honours ==
- 1. FC Kaiserslautern
  - Bundesliga champion: 1990–91, 1997–98
  - DFB-Pokal winner: 1995–96
- Czech Republic
  - UEFA European Football Championship runner-up: 1996
