= Uwe Scherr =

German footballer

Personal information
- Date of birth: 16 November 1966 (age 59)
- Place of birth: Amberg, West Germany
- Height: 1.78 m (5 ft 10 in)
- Position: Midfielder

Team information
- Current team: FC Schalke 04 (scout)

Senior career*
Years	Team	Apps	(Gls)
1989–1992	1. FC Kaiserslautern	80	(6)
1992–1996	FC Schalke 04	82	(2)
1997–1998	1. FC Köln	21	(2)
1998–1999	Wuppertaler SV		
- * Club domestic league appearances and goals

Uwe Scherr (born 16 November 1966 in Amberg) is a German former footballer who works as a scout for FC Amberg. He worked 12 years for FC Schalke 04 as chef scout, assistant manager of the Under-19 team and ans youth coordinator.

== Honours ==
1. FC Kaiserslautern

- Bundesliga: 1990–91
- DFB-Pokal: 1989–90
