= Michael Serr =

German footballer (born 1962)

Personal information
- Date of birth: July 14, 1962 (age 64)
- Place of birth: Landau, Germany
- Position: Goalkeeper

Senior career*
| Years | Team | Apps | (Gls) |
| –1985 | ASV Landau | | |
| 1986–1993 | 1. FC Kaiserslautern | 54 | (0) |
| 1993–1994 | 1. FC Saarbrücken | 10 | (0) |

Managerial career
- 2003–2006: SV Darmstadt 98 (GK coach)
- * Club domestic league appearances and goals as of 13:24, 13 February 2009 (UTC)

Michael Serr (born July 14, 1962) is a German retired football player. He spent 7 seasons in the Bundesliga with 1. FC Kaiserslautern. As of February 2009, he was working as a player agent.

== Honours ==
- Bundesliga champion: 1991
- DFB-Pokal winner: 1990
- DFL-Supercup: 1991
