= Christian Wück =

German footballer and coach

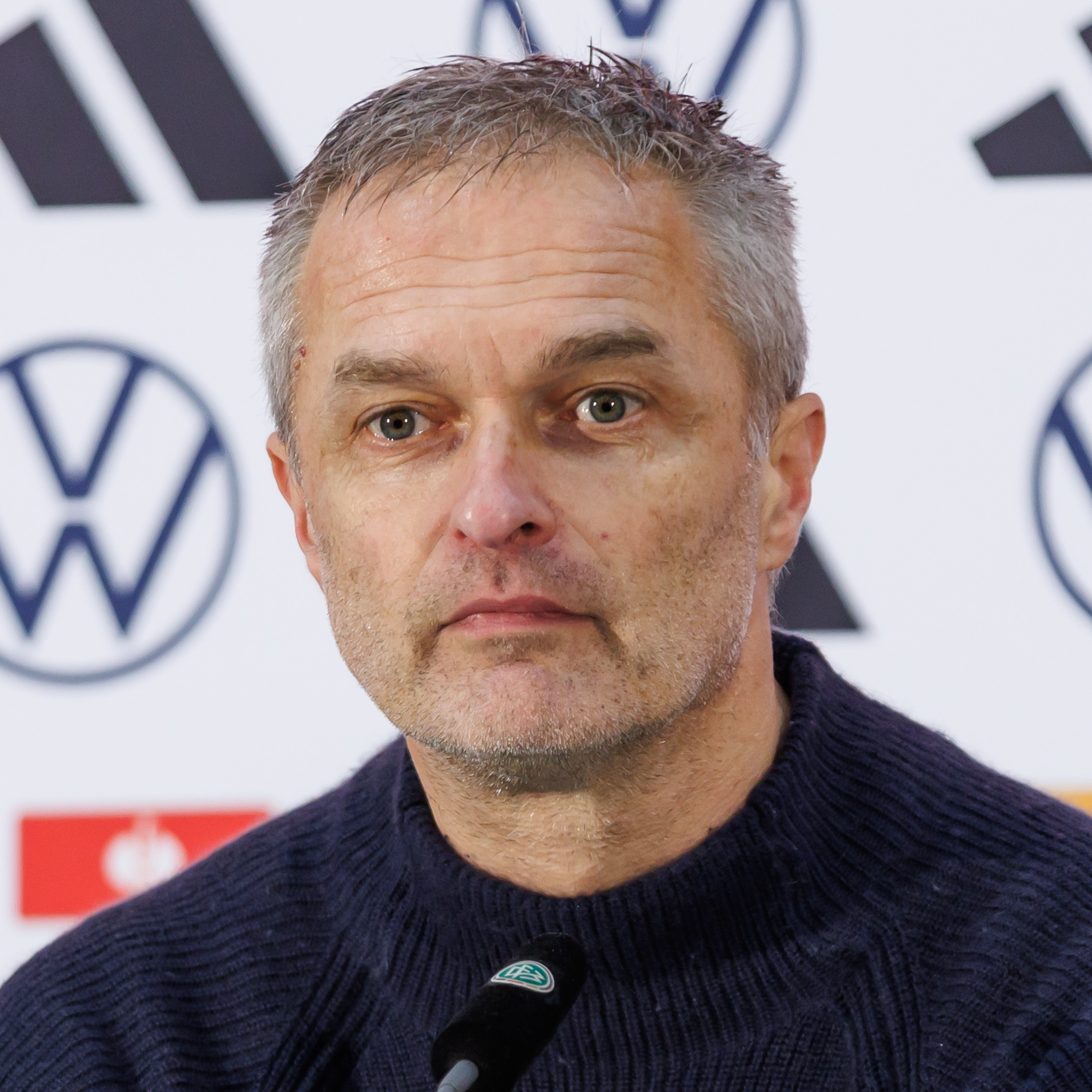
- Wück in 2025

Personal information
- Full name: Christian Richard Wück
- Date of birth: 9 June 1973 (age 53)
- Place of birth: Werneck, West Germany
- Height: 1.80 m (5 ft 11 in)
- Positions: Attacking midfielder; winger

Team information
- Current team: Germany women (Manager)

Youth career
- –1987: DJK Gänheim
- 1987–1988: Schweinfurt 05
- 1988–1990: 1. FC Nürnberg

Senior career*
| Years | Team | Apps | (Gls) |
| 1990–1994 | 1. FC Nürnberg | 94 | (13) |
| 1994–1998 | Karlsruher SC | 59 | (5) |
| 1999–2000 | VfL Wolfsburg | 14 | (0) |
| 2000–2002 | Arminia Bielefeld | 36 | (5) |
| Total | | 203 | (23) |

International career
| 1992–1994 | Germany U21 | 13 | (3) |

Managerial career
- 2005–2006: SV Enger-Westerenger
- 2007–2009: Rot Weiss Ahlen
- 2009–2010: Holstein Kiel
- 2012–2013: Germany U16
- 2013–2015: Germany U17
- 2015–2016: Germany U16
- 2015: Germany U17
- 2016–2017: Germany U17
- 2017–2018: Germany U15
- 2018–2019: Germany U16
- 2019–2024: Germany U17
- 2024–: Germany women
- * Club domestic league appearances and goals

Christian Richard Wück (born 9 June 1973) is a German football coach and former professional footballer who played as an attacking midfielder or as a winger. He works as head coach of the Germany women's national team.

== Managerial career ==
From early 2005 Wück was manager of lower-league club SV Enger-Westerenger.

In January 2007 he became assistant coach at Rot Weiss Ahlen, before being appointed manager in the June. He was sacked in March 2009.

In March 2024 it was announced that Wück would become manager of the Germany women's national team after the 2024 Summer Olympics, succeeding Horst Hrubesch. He signed a contract extension in January 2026.

== Honours ==
=== Player ===
Karlsruher SC

- DFB-Pokal finalist: 1995–96

=== Manager ===
Germany U17

- UEFA European Under-17 Championship: 2023; runner-up 2015
- FIFA U-17 World Cup: 2023
