= Uwe Weidemann =

German footballer

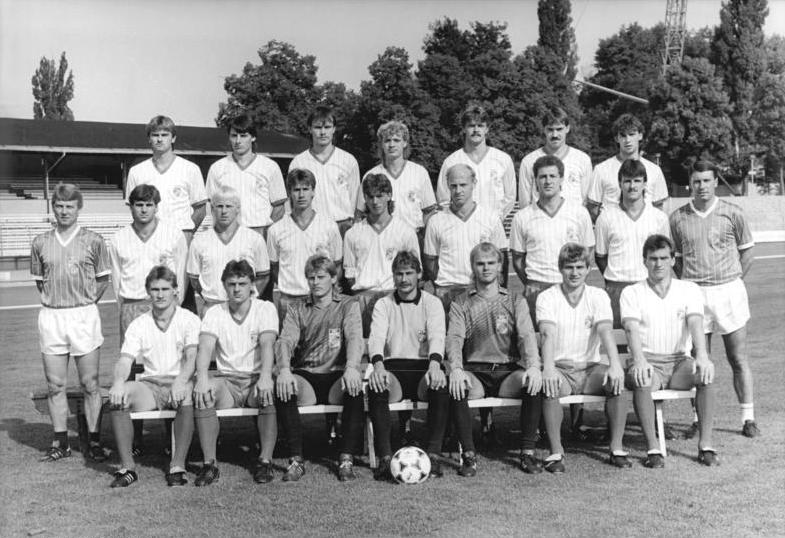
- Uwe Weidemann (middle row, third from left) with Rot-Weiß Erfurt in 1989

Personal information
- Date of birth: 14 June 1963 (age 63)
- Place of birth: Weißensee, Bezirk Erfurt, East Germany
- Height: 1.76 m (5 ft 9 in)
- Position: Attacking midfielder

Youth career
- 1970–1977: Traktor Weißensee
- 1977–1983: Rot-Weiß Erfurt

Senior career*
Years	Team	Apps	(Gls)
1983–1987	Rot-Weiß Erfurt	49	(15)
1987–1988	Lokomotive Leipzig	4	(0)
1988–1990	FC Rot-Weiß Erfurt	42	(6)
1990–1992	1. FC Nürnberg	23	(2)
1992–1993	Waldhof Mannheim	33	(5)
1993–1995	MSV Duisburg	60	(11)
1995–1996	Schalke 04	19	(1)
1997	Hertha BSC	7	(2)
1997–1999	FC Gütersloh	56	(7)
1999–2002	Fortuna Düsseldorf	63	(3)
Total		356	(52)

International career
1985–1990	East Germany	10	(0)

Managerial career
- 2003: Fortuna Düsseldorf
- 2003–2004: Fortuna Düsseldorf II
- 2004–2007: Fortuna Düsseldorf
- 2008–2009: KFC Uerdingen 05
- 2010–2011: VfR Fischeln
- * Club domestic league appearances and goals

Uwe Weidemann (born 14 June 1963) is an East German former professional footballer who played as an attacking midfielder. He later became a coach, last managing VfR Fischeln.

He appeared in 196 top-flight matches in East and the reunified Germany.

Weidemann made ten caps for the East Germany national team between 1985 and 1990.

== Honours ==
Schalke 04

- Bundesliga: third place 1995–96
- UEFA Cup: 1996–97
