= Herbert Hoos =

German footballer

Personal information
- Date of birth: 18 July 1965 (age 61)
- Height: 1.72 m (5 ft 8 in)
- Positions: Midfielder; defender

Youth career
- 1. FC Kaiserslautern

Senior career*
Years	Team	Apps	(Gls)
1983–1990	1. FC Kaiserslautern	133	(7)
1990–1994	Rot-Weiss Frankfurt		
1994–2001	FC Erlenbach		

International career
1984	Germany U-21	1	(0)
- * Club domestic league appearances and goals

Herbert Hoos (born 18 July 1965) is a retired German football player. He spent seven seasons in the Bundesliga with 1. FC Kaiserslautern.

== Honours ==
- DFB-Pokal winner: 1989–90
