= Günter Drews =

German footballer

Personal information
- Date of birth: 9 July 1967 (age 59)
- Position: Midfielder

Youth career
- Bayer 04 Leverkusen

Senior career*
Years	Team	Apps	(Gls)
1985–1987	Bayer 04 Leverkusen	46	(1)
1987–1989	Hannover 96	43	(8)
1989–1992	1. FC Nürnberg	23	(1)
1992–1993	AC Bellinzona		
1994–1995	SpVgg Greuther Fürth		
1995–2001	SC Eltersdorf		

International career
1985–1986	Germany U-21	6	(0)
- * Club domestic league appearances and goals

Günter Drews (born 9 July 1967) is a retired German football player.
