= Kay Friedmann =

German footballer

Personal information
- Date of birth: 15 May 1963 (age 63)
- Place of birth: Speyer, West Germany
- Height: 1.86 m (6 ft 1 in)
- Position: Defender

Youth career
- TuS Mechtersheim
- SV Südwest Ludwigshafen

Senior career*
Years	Team	Apps	(Gls)
1984–1986	FC 08 Homburg	58	(12)
1986–1991	1. FC Kaiserslautern	97	(4)
1991–1995	1. FC Nürnberg	86	(5)
- * Club domestic league appearances and goals

Kay Friedmann (born 15 May 1963 in Speyer) is a retired German football player. From 1995 to 2008 he worked as a physiotherapist for 1. FC Kaiserslautern.

== Honours ==
- Bundesliga champion: 1990–91
- DFB-Pokal winner: 1989–90
