= 1991 DFB-Supercup =

German Supercup
- Tournament programme cover

Tournament details
- Country: Germany
- Dates: 30 July – 6 August
- Teams: 4

Final positions
- Champions: 1. FC Kaiserslautern
- Runners-up: Werder Bremen
- Semifinalists: Stahl Eisenhüttenstadt; Hansa Rostock

Tournament statistics
- Matches played: 3
- Goals scored: 8 (2.67 per match)
- Attendance: 20,000 (6,667 per match)
- Top goal scorer(s): Jürgen Degen; Wynton Rufer (2 goals each)

The 1991 DFB-Supercup was the fifth edition of the DFB-Supercup. Uniquely, because Germany had just been reunified, the competition featured four teams instead of the usual two: The previous season's Bundesliga and DFB-Pokal winners, 1. FC Kaiserslautern and Werder Bremen, respectively, were joined by their counterparts from the East. Hansa Rostock had won both the NOFV-Oberliga and the NOFV-Pokal, so the losing cup finalists, Stahl Eisenhüttenstadt, took the fourth place in the competition.

Both Western teams advanced to the final, with Kaiserslautern defeating Werder Bremen 3–1 in the final in Hanover.

== Qualified teams ==
The winners of the league and cup competitions of West and East Germany qualified for the tournament.

Region	League winners	Cup winners
West	1. FC Kaiserslautern	Werder Bremen
East	Hansa Rostock (Note: Double winners.)	Stahl Eisenhüttenstadt (Note: NOFV-Pokal runners-up.)

== Bracket ==
Semi-finals
30 July – Rostock
Hansa Rostock	1
1. FC Kaiserslautern	2
31 July – Osnabrück
Stahl Eisenhüttenstadt	0
Werder Bremen	1

Final
6 August – Hanover
1. FC Kaiserslautern	3
Werder Bremen	1

== Semi-finals ==
=== League champions ===
30 July 1991
20:00 CEST

Hansa Rostock	1–2	1. FC Kaiserslautern
Weichert 58'	Report	Witeczek 25'; Dooley 44'

Ostseestadion, Rostock
Attendance: 8,000
Referee: Manfred Amerell (Munich)

=== Cup winners ===
31 July 1991
20:15 CEST

Stahl Eisenhüttenstadt	0–1	Werder Bremen
	Report	Rufer 89'

Piepenbrockstadion an der Bremer Brücke, Osnabrück
Attendance: 4,000
Referee: Bernd Heynemann (Magdeburg)

== Final ==
6 August 1991

1. FC Kaiserslautern	3–1	Werder Bremen
Degen 27', 65'; Winkler 90'	Report	Rufer 88'

Niedersachsenstadion, Hanover
Attendance: 8,000
Referee: Wolf-Günter Wiesel (Ottbergen)

== Top goalscorers ==
Rank	Player	Team	Goals
1	(Germany) Jürgen Degen	1. FC Kaiserslautern	2
1	(New Zealand) Wynton Rufer	Werder Bremen	2
2	(United States) Thomas Dooley	1. FC Kaiserslautern	1
2	(Germany) Florian Weichert	Hansa Rostock	1
2	(Germany) Bernhard Winkler	1. FC Kaiserslautern	1
2	(Germany) Marcel Witeczek	1. FC Kaiserslautern	1

== See also ==
- 1990–91 Bundesliga
- 1990–91 NOFV-Oberliga
- 1990–91 DFB-Pokal
- 1990–91 NOFV-Pokal
- Deutschland-Cup (football)
- East Germany–West Germany football rivalry
