= Franz Beckenbauer Supercup =

- Organiser(s): Deutscher Fußball-Bund (1987–1996); Deutsche Fußball Liga (2010–present)
- Founded: 1987
- Region: Germany
- Teams: 2
- Current champions: Bayern Munich (12th title)
- Most championships: Bayern Munich (12 titles)
- Broadcaster(s): ZDF (Germany only); DAZN (DACH only)
- Website: dfl.de
- 2026 Franz Beckenbauer Supercup

The Franz Beckenbauer Supercup, formerly known as the DFB-Supercup and DFL-Supercup and also known as the German Super Cup, is an annual football match in Germany that features the winners of the Bundesliga championship and the DFB-Pokal. The competition is run by the Deutsche Fußball Liga (English: German Football League).

== History and rules ==
The competition was founded in 1987 as the DFB-Supercup, run by the German Football Association (DFB). From 1992 to 1996, it was known as the "Panasonic DFB-Supercup" for sponsorship reasons. It was played up to the 1996 season, before being replaced by the DFB-Ligapokal (later the DFL-Ligapokal), a pre-season league cup competition, from the 1997–98 season. In 2008, although not officially sanctioned by any footballing body, the match returned as the T-Home Supercup, featuring Bundesliga and DFB-Pokal double winners Bayern Munich and fellow DFB-Pokal finalists Borussia Dortmund. The match was a one-year replacement for the DFB-Ligapokal, which was cancelled for one season, due to schedule crowding caused by UEFA Euro 2008. The competition was reinstated as the DFL-Supercup from the 2010–11 season at the annual general meeting of the Deutsche Fußball Liga on 10 November 2009.

Since 2010, in contrast to the DFB-Supercup, if one team wins the double (league and cup), the winner plays the runner-up of the Bundesliga. No extra time is played in the case of a draw after 90 minutes, the match is then decided by a penalty shoot-out. The match typically is played at the home of the cup holders, or the Bundesliga runners-up in the case a team wins the double, though this is not a rule, as the DFL ultimately decides on the venue.

From the 2025–26 season, the competition was renamed in honour of Franz Beckenbauer.

== Matches ==
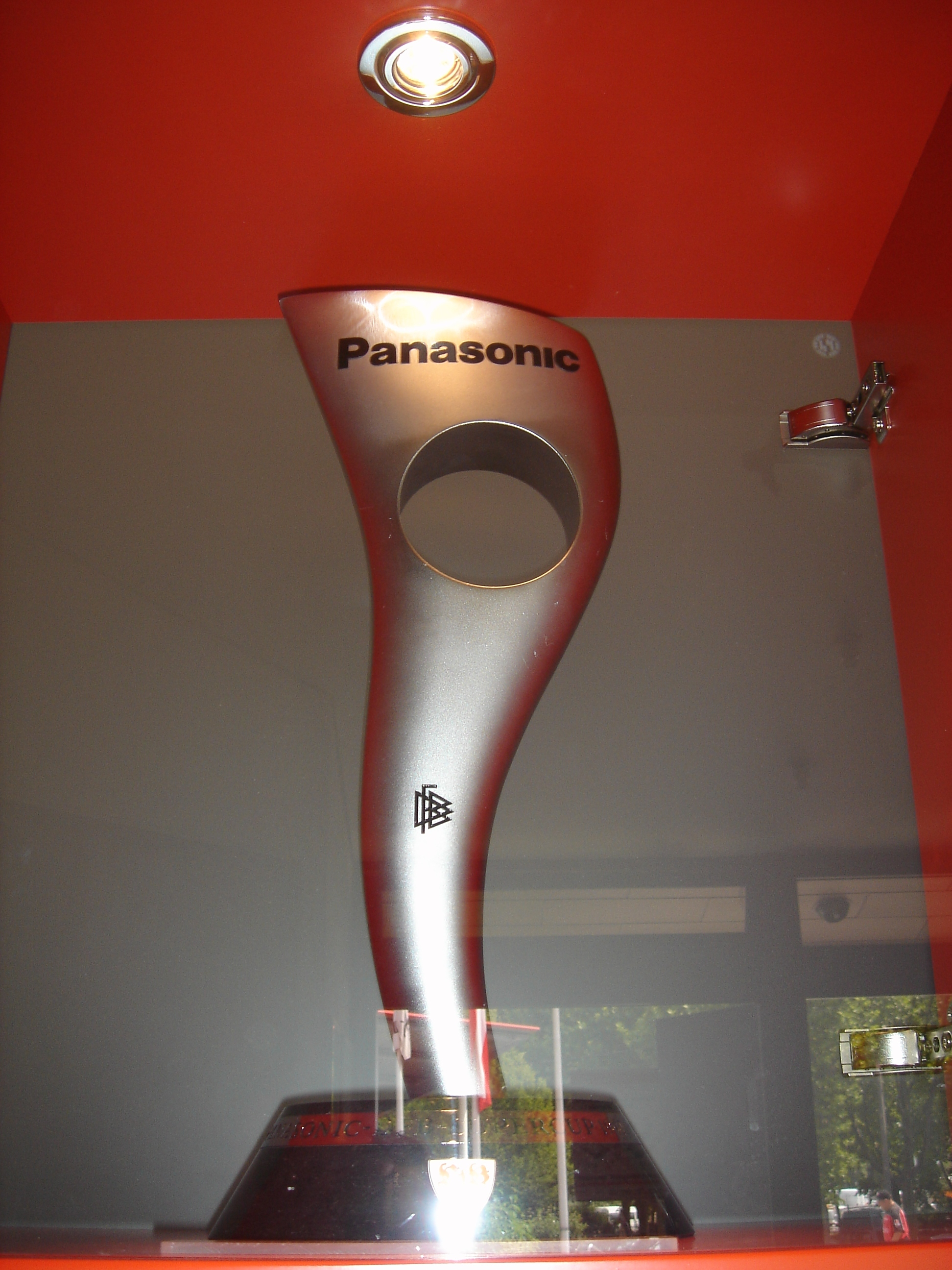
The sponsored DFB-Supercup trophy in 1992

Below is a list of the Super Cup winners. Since 2010, if one team wins the domestic double, then league runners-up are invited as the second team.

Year	Bundesliga champions	Result	DFB-Pokal winners (Note: Unless noted otherwise)	Venue
DFB-Supercup
1987	Bayern Munich	2–1	Hamburger SV	Waldstadion, Frankfurt
1988	Werder Bremen	2–0	Eintracht Frankfurt	Waldstadion, Frankfurt
1989	Bayern Munich	3–4	Borussia Dortmund	Fritz-Walter-Stadion, Kaiserslautern
1990	Bayern Munich	4–1	1. FC Kaiserslautern	Wildparkstadion, Karlsruhe
1991 (Note: The 1991 edition included four teams, the league and cup winners of the former East and West Germany.)	1. FC Kaiserslautern (Note: 1. FC Kaiserslautern won the semi-final match 2–1 against Hansa Rostock (double-winners of the 1990–91 NOFV-Oberliga and 1990–91 NOFV-Pokal) at the Ostseestadion, Rostock.)	3–1	Werder Bremen (Note: Werder Bremen won the semi-final match 1–0 against Stahl Eisenhüttenstadt (runners-up of the 1990–91 NOFV-Pokal) at the Piepenbrockstadion an der Bremer Brücke, Osnabrück.)	Niedersachsenstadion, Hanover
1992	VfB Stuttgart	3–1	Hannover 96 (II)	Niedersachsenstadion, Hanover
1993	Werder Bremen	2–2 (a.e.t.) (7–6 p)	Bayer Leverkusen	Ulrich-Haberland-Stadion, Leverkusen
1994	Bayern Munich	1–3 (a.e.t.)	Werder Bremen	Olympiastadion, Munich
1995	Borussia Dortmund	1–0	Borussia Mönchengladbach	Rheinstadion, Düsseldorf
1996	Borussia Dortmund	1–1 (a.e.t.) (4–3 p)	1. FC Kaiserslautern (II)	Carl-Benz-Stadion, Mannheim
1997–2009	Not held			
DFL-Supercup
2010	Bayern Munich	2–0	Schalke 04 (Note: Bundesliga runners-up)	Impuls Arena, Augsburg
2011	Borussia Dortmund	0–0 (Note: No extra time was played.) (3–4 p)	Schalke 04	Veltins-Arena, Gelsenkirchen
2012	Borussia Dortmund	1–2	Bayern Munich	Allianz Arena, Munich
2013	Bayern Munich	2–4	Borussia Dortmund	Signal Iduna Park, Dortmund
2014	Bayern Munich	0–2	Borussia Dortmund	Signal Iduna Park, Dortmund
2015	Bayern Munich	1–1 (4–5 p)	VfL Wolfsburg	Volkswagen Arena, Wolfsburg
2016	Bayern Munich	2–0	Borussia Dortmund	Signal Iduna Park, Dortmund
2017	Bayern Munich	2–2 (5–4 p)	Borussia Dortmund	Signal Iduna Park, Dortmund
2018	Bayern Munich	5–0	Eintracht Frankfurt	Commerzbank-Arena, Frankfurt
2019	Bayern Munich	0–2	Borussia Dortmund	Signal Iduna Park, Dortmund
2020	Bayern Munich	3–2	Borussia Dortmund	Allianz Arena, Munich
2021	Bayern Munich	3–1	Borussia Dortmund	Signal Iduna Park, Dortmund
2022	Bayern Munich	5–3	RB Leipzig	Red Bull Arena, Leipzig
2023	Bayern Munich	0–3	RB Leipzig	Allianz Arena, Munich
2024	Bayer Leverkusen	2–2 (4–3 p)	VfB Stuttgart	BayArena, Leverkusen
Franz Beckenbauer Supercup
2025	Bayern Munich	2–1	VfB Stuttgart	MHP Arena, Stuttgart
2026	Bayern Munich	2–1	Borussia Dortmund	Signal Iduna Park, Dortmund

== Performances ==
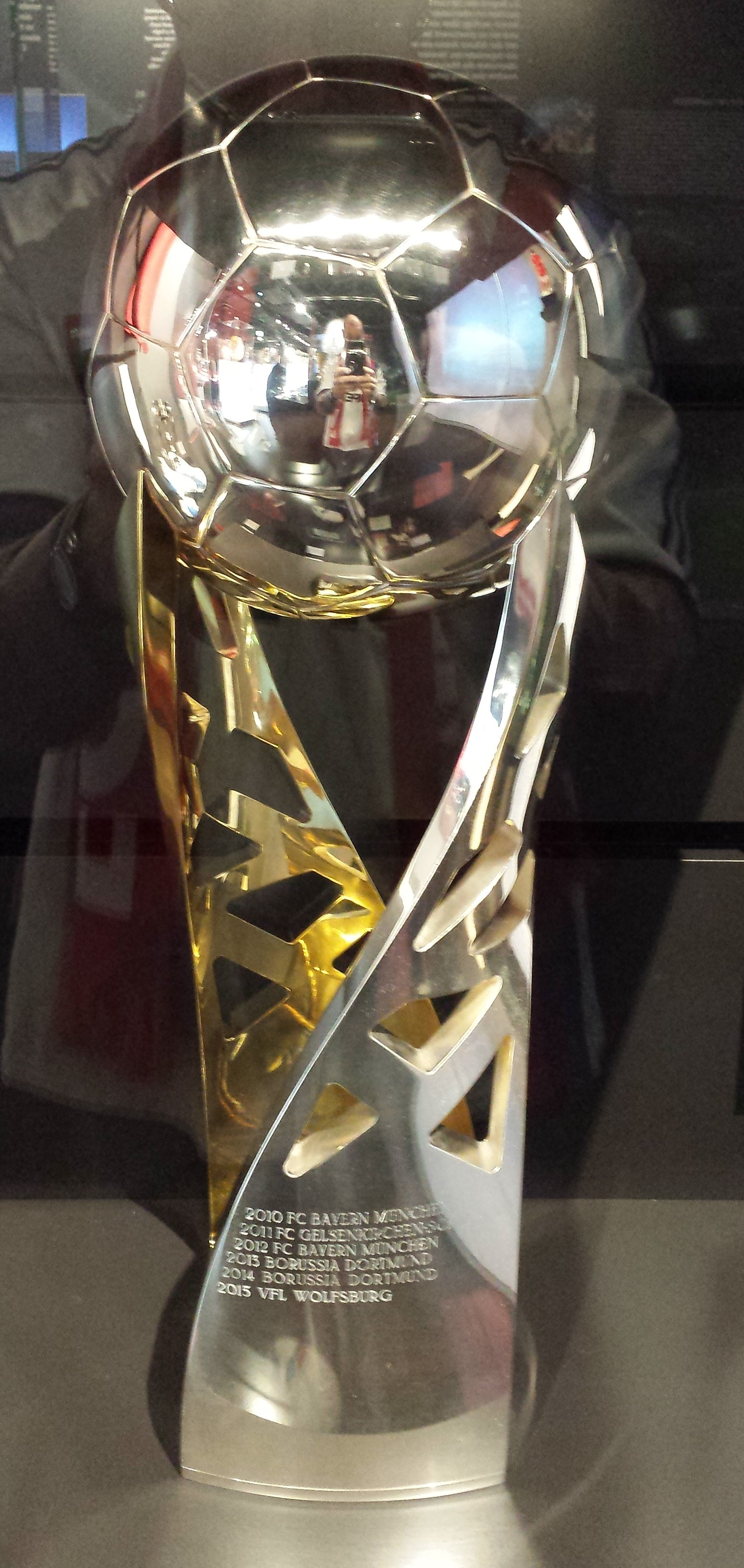
The Franz Beckenbauer Supercup trophy

=== Performance by team ===
Team	Winners	Runners-up	Years won	Years lost
Bayern Munich	12	7	1987, 1990, 2010, 2012, 2016, 2017, 2018, 2020, 2021, 2022, 2025, 2026	1989, 1994, 2013, 2014, 2015, 2019, 2023
Borussia Dortmund	6	7	1989, 1995, 1996, 2013, 2014, 2019	2011, 2012, 2016, 2017, 2020, 2021, 2026
Werder Bremen	3	1	1988, 1993, 1994	1991
1. FC Kaiserslautern	1	2	1991	1990, 1996
VfB Stuttgart	1	2	1992	2024, 2025
Schalke 04	1	1	2011	2010
RB Leipzig	1	1	2023	2022
Bayer Leverkusen	1	1	2024	1993
VfL Wolfsburg	1	—	2015	—
Eintracht Frankfurt	—	2	—	1988, 2018
Hamburger SV	—	1	—	1987
Hannover 96	—	1	—	1992
Borussia Mönchengladbach	—	1	—	1995

=== Performance by qualification ===
Competition	Winners	Runners-up
Bundesliga winners	18	9
DFB-Pokal winners	5	13
Bundesliga runners-up	4	5

== Top goalscorers ==
Rank	Player	Club(s)	Goals
1	(Poland) Robert Lewandowski	Borussia Dortmund; Bayern Munich	7
2	(Germany) Thomas Müller	Bayern Munich	5
3	(Spain) Dani Olmo	RB Leipzig	4
3	(New Zealand) Wynton Rufer	Werder Bremen	4
5	(Germany) Marco Reus	Borussia Dortmund	3
5	(Netherlands) Arjen Robben	Bayern Munich	3
5	(Germany) Jürgen Wegmann	Borussia Dortmund; Bayern Munich	3
8	(Gabon) Pierre-Emerick Aubameyang	Borussia Dortmund	2
8	(Germany) Günter Breitzke	Borussia Dortmund	2
8	(Germany) Jürgen Degen	1. FC Kaiserslautern	2

== Unofficial matches ==
The German champions met the cup winners several times without the match being officially recognized.

Year	German champions	Result	Cup winners	Venue	Match name	Ref.
1941 (Note: The 1940 German champions, Schalke 04, and the 1940 Tschammerpokal winners, Dresdner SC, faced each other on 16 March 1941.)	Schalke 04	2–4	Dresdner SC	DSC-Stadion, Dresden	Herausforderungskampf	
1977 (Note: The 1975–76 Bundesliga winners, Borussia Mönchengladbach, and the 1975–76 DFB-Pokal winners, Hamburger SV, faced each other on 8 January 1977.)	Borussia Mönchengladbach	3–2	Hamburger SV	Volksparkstadion, Hamburg	Deutscher Supercup	
1983 (Note: The 1981–82 Bundesliga winners, Hamburger SV, and the 1981–82 DFB-Pokal winners, Bayern Munich, faced each other on 2 April 1983.)	Hamburger SV	1–1 (2–4 p)	Bayern Munich	Olympiastadion, Munich	Deutscher Supercup	
2008	Bayern Munich	1–2	Borussia Dortmund (Note: DFB-Pokal runners-up)	Signal Iduna Park, Dortmund	T-Home Supercup	
2009	VfL Wolfsburg	1–2	Werder Bremen	Volkswagen Arena, Wolfsburg	Volkswagen SuperCup	

== See also ==
- DFV-Supercup
- DFL-Ligapokal
