= 1990–91 Bundesliga =

28th season of the Bundesliga

Bundesliga
- Season: 1990–91
- Dates: 8 August 1990 – 15 June 1991
- Champions: 1. FC Kaiserslautern; 1st Bundesliga title 3rd German title
- Relegated: FC St. Pauli; Bayer 05 Uerdingen; Hertha BSC Berlin
- European Cup: 1. FC Kaiserslautern
- Cup Winners' Cup: SV Werder Bremen
- UEFA Cup: FC Bayern Munich; Eintracht Frankfurt; Hamburger SV; VfB Stuttgart
- Matches: 306
- Goals: 863 (2.82 per match)
- Average goals/game: 2.82
- Top goalscorer: Roland Wohlfarth (21)
- Biggest home win: FC Bayern 7–0 Wattenscheid (24 November 1990); Stuttgart 7–0 Dortmund (23 February 1991)
- Biggest away win: Frankfurt 0–6 Hamburg (13 April 1991)
- Highest scoring: Uerdingen 3–7 K'lautern (10 goals) (22 September 1990); FC Bayern 7–3 Hertha BSC (10 goals) (25 May 1991)

The 1990–91 Bundesliga was the 28th season of the Bundesliga, the premier football league in West Germany. It began on 8 August 1990 and ended on 15 June 1991. FC Bayern Munich were the defending champions.

With the Reunification of Germany on 3 October 1990, it was the last season that the league was exclusive to teams from the former West Germany before it was opened to teams from the former East Germany.

== Competition format ==
Every team played two games against each other team, one at home and one away. Teams received two points for a win and one point for a draw. If two or more teams were tied on points, places were determined by goal difference and, if still tied, by goals scored. The team with the most points were crowned champions while the two teams with the fewest points were relegated to 2. Bundesliga. The third-to-last team had to compete in a two-legged relegation/promotion play-off against the third-placed team from 2. Bundesliga.

== Team changes to 1989–90 ==
SV Waldhof Mannheim and FC Homburg were directly relegated to the 2. Bundesliga after finishing in the last two places. They were replaced by Hertha BSC and SG Wattenscheid 09. Relegation/promotion play-off participant VfL Bochum won on aggregate against 1. FC Saarbrücken and thus retained their Bundesliga status.

== Team overview ==
Location of teams in Bundesliga 1990–91

Club	Location	Ground	Capacity
Hertha BSC Berlin	Berlin	Olympiastadion	76,000
VfL Bochum	Bochum	Ruhrstadion	40,000
SV Werder Bremen	Bremen	Weserstadion	32,000
Borussia Dortmund	Dortmund	Westfalenstadion	54,000
Fortuna Düsseldorf	Düsseldorf	Rheinstadion	59,600
Eintracht Frankfurt	Frankfurt	Waldstadion	62,000
Hamburger SV	Hamburg	Volksparkstadion	62,000
1. FC Kaiserslautern	Kaiserslautern	Fritz-Walter-Stadion	42,000
Karlsruher SC	Karlsruhe	Wildparkstadion	50,000
1. FC Köln	Cologne	Müngersdorfer Stadion	61,000
Bayer 04 Leverkusen	Leverkusen	Ulrich-Haberland-Stadion	20,000
Borussia Mönchengladbach	Mönchengladbach	Bökelbergstadion	34,500
FC Bayern Munich	Munich	Olympiastadion	70,000
1. FC Nürnberg	Nuremberg	Städtisches Stadion	64,238
FC St. Pauli	Hamburg	Stadion am Millerntor	18,000
VfB Stuttgart	Stuttgart	Neckarstadion	72,000
Bayer 05 Uerdingen	Krefeld	Grotenburg-Stadion	34,500
SG Wattenscheid 09	Bochum	Lohrheidestadion	15,000

- ^1 Wattenscheid played their first six home matches at Ruhrstadion because their own ground was upgraded to meet Bundesliga requirements.

== League table ==
Pos	Team	Pld	W	D	L	GF	GA	GD	Pts	Qualification or relegation
1	1. FC Kaiserslautern (C)	34	19	10	5	72	45	+27	48	Qualification to European Cup first round
2	Bayern Munich	34	18	9	7	74	41	+33	45	Qualification to UEFA Cup first round (Note: As Werder Bremen qualified for the Cup Winners' Cup, their UEFA-Cup place was transferred to Stuttgart.)
3	Werder Bremen	34	14	14	6	46	29	+17	42	Qualification to Cup Winners' Cup first round
4	Eintracht Frankfurt	34	15	10	9	63	40	+23	40	Qualification to UEFA Cup first round
5	Hamburger SV	34	16	8	10	60	38	+22	40	Qualification to UEFA Cup first round
6	VfB Stuttgart	34	14	10	10	57	44	+13	38	Qualification to UEFA Cup first round
7	1. FC Köln	34	13	11	10	50	43	+7	37	
8	Bayer Leverkusen	34	11	13	10	47	46	+1	35	
9	Borussia Mönchengladbach	34	9	17	8	49	54	−5	35	
10	Borussia Dortmund	34	10	14	10	46	57	−11	34	
11	SG Wattenscheid 09	34	9	15	10	42	51	−9	33	
12	Fortuna Düsseldorf	34	11	10	13	40	49	−9	32	
13	Karlsruher SC	34	8	15	11	46	52	−6	31	
14	VfL Bochum	34	9	11	14	50	52	−2	29	
15	1. FC Nürnberg	34	10	9	15	40	54	−14	29	
16	FC St. Pauli (R)	34	6	15	13	33	53	−20	27	Qualification to relegation play-offs
17	Bayer 05 Uerdingen (R)	34	5	13	16	34	54	−20	23	Relegation to 2. Bundesliga
18	Hertha BSC (R)	34	3	8	23	37	84	−47	14	Relegation to 2. Bundesliga

Source: www.dfb.de
Rules for classification: 1) points; 2) goal difference; 3) number of goals scored.
The league expanded to 20 teams for the 1991–92 season because of the integration of the two best East German Oberliga teams due to German reunification.
(C) Champions; (R) Relegated

== Results ==
Home \ Away	BSC	BOC	SVW	BVB	F95	SGE	HSV	FCK	KSC	KOE	B04	BMG	FCB	FCN	STP	VFB	B05	SGW
Hertha BSC	—	2–4	0–0	2–2	0–1	1–0	1–4	0–2	1–1	0–0	1–2	1–1	0–0	2–4	1–2	0–2	0–0	2–3
VfL Bochum	4–2	—	1–2	2–2	0–0	0–0	0–1	0–2	0–1	1–0	3–1	3–0	1–2	0–0	3–0	1–1	0–2	0–0
Werder Bremen	6–0	2–1	—	1–1	3–1	1–1	3–1	1–2	2–0	2–1	1–1	3–0	1–0	0–0	1–0	0–1	4–3	1–1
Borussia Dortmund	3–1	1–0	1–1	—	1–1	0–3	1–1	0–2	2–2	1–2	1–1	1–1	2–3	0–2	5–2	0–3	1–0	2–2
Fortuna Düsseldorf	4–2	3–4	1–2	0–0	—	1–0	2–1	0–0	5–2	0–2	0–2	4–1	1–2	3–0	0–0	0–4	0–2	2–1
Eintracht Frankfurt	5–1	1–1	0–0	3–1	5–1	—	0–6	4–3	3–0	1–0	3–1	5–1	1–4	0–1	1–1	4–0	4–0	4–0
Hamburger SV	2–0	1–0	3–2	4–0	1–0	0–1	—	1–3	2–2	1–1	3–1	3–0	2–3	4–0	5–0	2–0	2–0	0–0
1. FC Kaiserslautern	4–3	4–1	1–0	2–2	0–0	1–1	1–0	—	3–2	2–2	2–1	2–3	2–1	3–1	1–0	2–0	2–0	1–1
Karlsruher SC	3–0	3–2	1–1	1–2	1–1	2–2	2–2	4–2	—	1–1	2–0	3–2	2–3	2–0	1–1	0–0	2–0	1–3
1. FC Köln	2–1	0–0	1–0	0–1	1–1	2–1	1–0	2–6	0–0	—	1–1	1–3	4–0	3–1	2–0	1–6	3–1	1–1
Bayer Leverkusen	3–1	4–2	0–0	1–2	1–1	2–2	2–2	2–2	1–0	2–0	—	2–5	1–2	2–2	3–1	0–0	1–0	2–1
Borussia Mönchengladbach	2–0	1–2	1–1	2–1	2–0	1–1	1–1	2–2	2–1	2–2	1–1	—	1–1	2–0	1–1	2–0	1–1	1–1
Bayern Munich	7–3	2–2	1–1	2–3	0–1	2–0	6–1	4–0	3–0	2–2	1–1	4–1	—	1–0	0–1	2–1	2–2	7–0
1. FC Nürnberg	1–4	3–2	2–3	1–1	3–0	0–2	3–1	1–4	0–0	0–4	1–0	2–2	0–1	—	5–2	0–1	1–1	4–2
FC St. Pauli	2–2	3–3	0–0	0–2	2–3	1–1	0–2	1–0	2–0	2–0	1–0	1–1	0–0	0–0	—	2–2	1–1	1–1
VfB Stuttgart	4–0	2–2	0–1	7–0	1–1	2–1	2–0	2–2	2–2	3–2	0–2	1–1	0–3	2–1	2–1	—	3–1	1–4
Bayer Uerdingen	1–2	4–1	0–0	1–3	1–2	2–3	0–0	3–7	1–1	0–3	1–1	1–1	1–1	0–0	2–0	2–0	—	0–2
SG Wattenscheid	3–1	0–4	2–0	1–1	2–0	1–0	0–1	0–0	1–1	0–3	1–2	1–1	3–2	0–1	2–2	2–2	0–0	—

Source: DFB
Legend: Blue = home team win; Yellow = draw; Red = away team win.

== Relegation play-offs ==
FC St. Pauli and third-placed 2. Bundesliga team Stuttgarter Kickers had to compete in a two-legged relegation/promotion play-off. After a two-leg series, both teams were tied 2–2 on aggregate, so a deciding third match had to be scheduled. Stuttgarter Kickers won this match and were promoted to the Bundesliga.

19 June 1991

FC St. Pauli	1–1	Stuttgarter Kickers
Golke 31'	Report link (in German)	Marin 88'

Stadion am Millerntor, Hamburg
Attendance: 20,500
Referee: Karl-Josef Assenmacher (Hürth)

23 June 1991

Stuttgarter Kickers	1–1	FC St. Pauli
Schwartz 25'	Report link (in German)	Golke 51'

Neckarstadion, Stuttgart
Attendance: 32,000
Referee: Werner Föckler (Bad Dürkheim)

29 June 1991

Stuttgarter Kickers	3–1	FC St. Pauli
Vollmer 21'; Cayasso 35'; Fengler 42'	Report link (in German)	Knäbel 37'

Parkstadion, Gelsenkirchen
Attendance: 18,000
Referee: Hans-Peter Dellwing (Trier)

== Top goalscorers ==
21 goals

- (Germany) Roland Wohlfarth (FC Bayern Munich)

20 goals

- (Poland) Jan Furtok (Hamburger SV)

16 goals

- (Germany) Andreas Möller (Eintracht Frankfurt)

15 goals

- (Germany) Thomas Allofs (Fortuna Düsseldorf)
- (New Zealand) Wynton Rufer (SV Werder Bremen)

14 goals

- (Germany) Maurice Banach (1. FC Köln)

13 goals

- (Senegal) Souleyman Sané (SG Wattenscheid 09)

12 goals

- (Germany) Hans-Jörg Criens (Borussia Mönchengladbach)
- (Germany) Fritz Walter (VfB Stuttgart)

11 goals

- (Germany) Ulf Kirsten (Bayer 04 Leverkusen)
- (Germany) Stefan Kohn (VfL Bochum)
- (Germany) Stefan Kuntz (1. FC Kaiserslautern)
- (Brazil) Nando (Hamburger SV)
- (Germany) Matthias Sammer (VfB Stuttgart)
- (Germany) Rainer Schütterle (Karlsruher SC)

== Attendances ==
No.	Team	Attendance	Change	Highest
1	Borussia Dortmund	35,923	-3.4%	53,000
2	Bayern München	35,885	-1.0%	73,153
3	1. FC Kaiserslautern	32,145	26.4%	38,500
4	VfB Stuttgart	28,882	16.1%	68,000
5	Eintracht Frankfurt	24,310	-9.1%	60,843
6	Hamburger SV	23,994	12.4%	61,000
7	1. FC Nürnberg	23,337	-6.9%	51,750
8	1. FC Köln	21,235	-4.7%	55,000
9	Werder Bremen	20,420	6.0%	32,875
10	Borussia Mönchengladbach	19,291	-1.9%	34,000
11	VfL Bochum	18,786	2.3%	40,051
12	FC St. Pauli	18,628	-2.1%	38,200
13	Karlsruher SC	18,294	-5.0%	33,000
14	Fortuna 95	16,588	-16.8%	48,000
15	Hertha BSC	15,186	13.0%	38,752
16	Bayer Leverkusen	13,618	-5.6%	25,800
17	Wattenscheid 09	13,612	168.6%	43,200
18	Bayer 05 Uerdingen	10,547	-13.8%	23,000

== See also ==
- 1990–91 2. Bundesliga
- 1990–91 DFB-Pokal
